= 1962 English cricket season =

1962 was the 63rd season of County Championship cricket in England.

It was also the last season to feature the venerable Gentlemen v Players fixture: as a result of the distinction between amateurs ("Gentlemen") and professionals ("Players") being abolished following the end of the season, all first-class cricketers became nominally professional (or "Players").

Yorkshire won the County Championship, and England easily defeated an inexperienced Pakistan team.

== Honours ==
- Test Series – England 4–0 Pakistan; one match drawn
- County Championship – Yorkshire
- Minor Counties Championship – Warwickshire II
- Second XI Championship – Worcestershire II
- Wisden Cricketers of the Year^{[a]} – Don Kenyon, Mushtaq Mohammad, Peter Parfitt, Phil Sharpe, Fred Titmus

== Pakistani tour ==
England easily beat an inexperienced Pakistan team 4–0 with one match drawn:

- 1st Test at Edgbaston – England won by an innings and 24 runs
- 2nd Test at Lord's – England won by 9 wickets
- 3rd Test at Headingley – England won by an innings and 117 runs
- 4th Test at Trent Bridge – match drawn
- 5th Test at The Oval – England won by 10 wickets

== Other major fixtures ==
- MCC v Yorkshire
- MCC v Surrey
- University Match

Gentlemen v Players

There were two matches in 1962. The first was at Lord's from Wednesday, 18 July to Friday, 20 July and was drawn. The teams were captained by Ted Dexter (Gentlemen) and Fred Trueman (Players). The second match was played at the North Marine Road Ground, Scarborough from Saturday, 8 September to Tuesday, 11 September. The Players won by 7 wickets. Mike Smith captained the Gentlemen in this match and Trueman again led the Players.

The match at Scarborough was also the final edition of the fixture which began in 1806: from the start of the 1963 season, amateur status in first-class cricket was abolished. Thus, all players thenceforward had equal status as cricketers and were nominally professionals or "Players", with the "Gentlemen" ceasing to exist.

ESPNcricinfo has a photograph of Fred Trueman leading out the Players XI for the start of the match at Lord's on 18 July. Immediately behind Trueman are Tom Graveney (left, laughing) and Derek Shackleton. Wicket-keeper Keith Andrew is mostly hidden by Graveney. Norman Gifford (left) and Peter Walker (very tall) have just stepped onto the field. At the bottom of the steps are John Edrich (left) and Peter Parfitt. Phil Sharpe is behind Edrich and almost completely hidden apart from his Yorkshire cap. Fred Titmus is behind Sharpe and Micky Stewart is near the top of the steps.

There is a team photograph of the Gentlemen XI in the Lord's match. They were: (back row, l to r) Roger Prideaux, David Pithey, Ossie Wheatley, Tony Lewis, Alan Smith (wk), Edward Craig; (front row, l to r) Bob Barber, Trevor Bailey, Ted Dexter (captain), David Sheppard, Mike Smith.

== Wisden Cricketers of the Year ==
In its 1963 edition, Wisden Cricketers' Almanack announced that its five cricketers of the 1962 season were Don Kenyon, Mushtaq Mohammad, Peter Parfitt, Phil Sharpe and Fred Titmus. As a rule, though it has occasionally been broken, Wisden never selects a player more than once. Among players of 1962 who had been selected previously were Trevor Bailey in 1950; Tom Graveney, David Sheppard and Fred Trueman in 1953; Tony Lock in 1954; Fazal Mahmood and Brian Statham in 1955; Colin Cowdrey in 1956; Micky Stewart in 1958; Derek Shackleton in 1959; Ken Barrington, Ray Illingworth and Geoff Pullar in 1960; Ted Dexter and Vic Wilson in 1961.

== Achievements ==
Bill Alley did the double, with 1,915 runs and 112 wickets

Batting Tom Graveney topped the averages with 2,269 runs at 54.02

Bowling David Sydenham topped the averages with 115 wickets at 17.65

== Footnotes ==
• a) The Wisden Cricketers of the Year for 1962 were announced in the 1963 edition of Wisden Cricketers' Almanack.

== See also ==
- History of English amateur cricket and Amateur status in first-class cricket

== Annual reviews ==
- Playfair. Ross, Gordon (ed.). Playfair Cricket Annual (16th edition) (1963 ed.). London: Playfair Books Ltd.
- Wisden. Preston, Norman (ed.). Wisden Cricketers' Almanack, 100th edition (1963 ed.). London: Sporting Handbooks Ltd.
