= Australian cricket team in England in 1964 =

International cricket tour

The Australian cricket team toured England in the 1964 season to play a five-match Test series against England for The Ashes. Australia won the series 1–0 with 4 matches drawn and therefore retained The Ashes.

== Test series summary ==
=== First Test ===
4–9 June 1964
Scorecard

England	v	Australia
216/8d (102 overs); G Boycott 48 (118); TR Veivers 3/39 (16 overs)		168 (78.3 overs); RB Simpson 50 (145); LJ Coldwell 3/48 (22 overs)
193/9d (66.5 overs); ER Dexter 68 (88); GD McKenzie 5/53 (24 overs)		40/2 (9.2 overs); NCL O'Neill 24 retired hurt (23); JA Flavell 1/11 (4.2 overs)

Match drawn
Trent Bridge, Nottingham
Umpires: JS Buller and CS Elliott

- England won the toss and elected to bat.
- 7 June was taken as a rest day.
- There was no play on the third day.
- G Boycott (ENG), and GE Corling (AUS) made their Test debuts.

=== Second Test ===
18–23 June 1964
Scorecard

Australia	v	England
176 (84 overs); TR Veivers 54 (134); FS Trueman 5/48 (25 overs)		246 (99.3 overs); JH Edrich 120 (282); GE Corling 4/60 (27.3 overs)
168/4 (74 overs); PJP Burge 59 (110); FJ Titmus 2/21 (17 overs)

Match drawn
Lord's, London
Umpires: JS Buller and JF Crapp

- England won the toss and elected to field.
- 21 June was taken as a rest day.
- There was no play on the first or second days.
- N Gifford (ENG) made his Test debut.

=== Third Test ===
2–6 July 1964
Scorecard

England	v	Australia
268 (103.3 overs); JM Parks 68 (136); NJN Hawke 5/75 (31.3 overs)		389 (158.3 overs); PJP Burge 160 (308); FJ Titmus 4/69 (50 overs)
229 (89.5 overs); KF Barrington 85 (162); GE Corling 3/52 (17.5 overs)		111/3 (57 overs); IR Redpath 58* (174); FJ Titmus 2/25 (27 overs)

Australia won by 7 wickets
Headingley, Leeds
Umpires: CS Elliott and WFF Price

- England won the toss and elected to bat.
- 5 July was taken as a rest day.
- The match was scheduled for five days but completed in four.
- RM Cowper (AUS) made his Test debut.

In the decisive Third Test, Australia was 187–7 in reply to England's 268 when Ted Dexter decided to take the new ball. In response, Peter Burge, the last recognised batsman, went on the attack. He scored 160, well supported by Neil Hawke and Wally Grout, the last three wickets adding 211. This left England 121 behind on first innings and they could not recover.

=== Fourth Test ===
23–28 July 1964
Scorecard

Australia	v	England
656/8d (255.5 overs); RB Simpson 311 (743); JSE Price 3/183 (45 overs)		611 (293.1 overs); KF Barrington 256 (624); GD McKenzie 7/153 (60 overs)
4/0 (2 overs); RB Simpson 4* (6)

Match drawn
Old Trafford, Manchester
Umpires: JS Buller and WFF Price

- Australia won the toss and elected to bat.
- 26 July was taken as a rest day.
- TW Cartwright and FE Rumsey (both ENG) made their Test debuts.

Since a draw in the Fourth Test would ensure that Australia would retain the Ashes, they batted on until they had reached 656-8 before declaring, with Bob Simpson scoring 311, belatedly his first Test century. England responded with 611 (Ken Barrington 256, Ted Dexter 174) and the match ended in the dullest of draws.

=== Fifth Test ===
13–18 August 1964
Scorecard

England	v	Australia
182 (71.4 overs); KF Barrington 47 (83); NJN Hawke 6/47 (25.4 overs)		379 (177.3 overs); WM Lawry 94 (320); FS Trueman 4/87 (33.3 overs)
381/4 (163 overs); G Boycott 113 (311); GD McKenzie 3/112 (38 overs)

Match drawn
The Oval, London
Umpires: JF Crapp and CS Elliott

- England won the toss and elected to bat.
- 16 August was taken as a rest day.
- There was no play on the final day.

== Ceylon ==
The Australians had a stopover in Colombo en route to England and played a one-day single-innings match there against the Ceylon national team, which at that time did not have Test status.

== Annual reviews ==
- Playfair Cricket Annual 1965
- Wisden Cricketers' Almanack 1965
