= English cricket team in Australia in 1962–63 =

International cricket tour

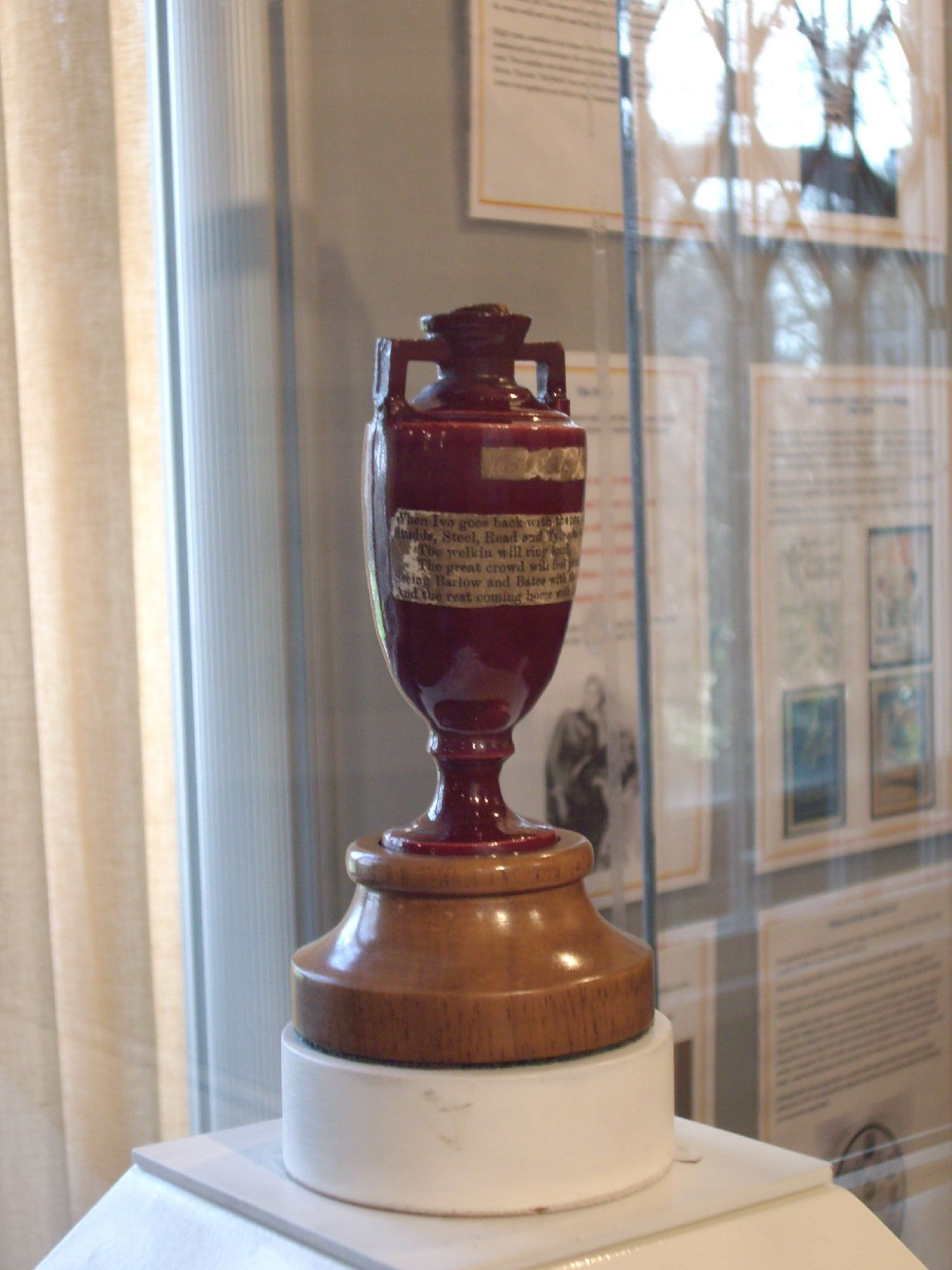
"The Ashes" were retained by Australia in the 1962–63 Test series.

The England cricket team toured Australia and New Zealand between October 1962 and March 1963 with a one-match stopover in Colombo, en route to Australia. The tour was organised by Marylebone Cricket Club (MCC) and, in all matches other than Tests, the team was called MCC. In Australia, the tour itinerary consisted of 15 first-class matches, including the five-match Test series against Australia in which The Ashes were at stake. It was the last England cricket tour of Australia where the team travelled by ship.

The Test series was drawn and so Australia retained The Ashes. England won the second Test at the Melbourne Cricket Ground by seven wickets but Australia levelled the series in the next match at the Sydney Cricket Ground with an eight wicket victory. After the fourth Test was drawn, England captain Ted Dexter was expected to launch an all-out attempt to win the fifth and so claim the series and The Ashes. He adopted a safety first approach instead, which meant the match became a dull draw, and he was heavily criticised for his negative tactics. In other matches, the MCC team were unconvincing, their few successes having counterpoint in heavy defeats by both New South Wales and a Combined XI team. After leaving Australia in February, England played a three-match Test series in New Zealand.

== Background to the tour ==
Richie Benaud captained Australia in the Test series.

Australia, led by Richie Benaud, had won The Ashes back from England in the 1958–59 series. Australia won four of the Tests in that series with one drawn. In the 1961 series in England, Australia had retained The Ashes by winning two Tests to one. Since then, England had convincingly defeated Pakistan in the 1962 series and there was a measure of optimism that the 1962–63 team might succeed in Australia although, as E. W. Swanton put it: "most judges accorded them a sporting chance of winning back the Ashes, but no more".

The big pre-tour issue for England was encapsulated in the title of an editorial written by Gordon Ross in the 1962 edition of the Playfair Cricket Annual: "Who will lead in Australia?" At the beginning of the 1962 season, England's Test captaincy was in a state of flux. Peter May had been captain for a record 41 Tests through 1955 to 1961, but he missed two matches in the 1961 Ashes series due to illness and he then declined to tour India, Pakistan and Ceylon in 1961–62, as also did Colin Cowdrey, Brian Statham and Fred Trueman. Ross believed there were three candidates to succeed May. One was Cowdrey who had been May's vice-captain for several years and another was Ted Dexter who had accepted the captaincy for the tour of the sub-continent. Dexter, however, had not been highly successful because, although England won their series in Pakistan 1–0, they lost the series in India 2–0 and that was India's first series victory over England. Ross' third option was David Sheppard, who had been out of cricket for over five years while he pursued his career as a churchman. Sheppard was owed long overdue leave and was expected to take a sabbatical so he could make a return to first-class cricket with Sussex, even if not with England.

Ahead of the 1962 series against Pakistan, Dexter was asked to continue as captain and he led England to big wins in the first two Tests, but then Cowdrey was given the job in the third Test which began on 5 July. England won that match by an innings. Cowdrey was then asked to captain the amateurs in the last-ever Gentlemen v Players match, starting at Lord's on 18 July. According to Wisden Cricketers' Almanack, the match was "in some respects a Test trial" because the MCC team for Australia would be chosen at the end of the month. Dexter and Sheppard were also playing for the amateurs; the professionals were led by Trueman. The plot thickened. Cowdrey had to withdraw from the Gentlemen team following an attack of nephrolithiasis and Dexter was appointed instead. Sheppard opened for Gentlemen and scored 112. He and Dexter, who scored 55, shared a second wicket partnership of 97. Next day, the media were moreorless unanimous in calling for Sheppard to lead the team in Australia. Hours later, MCC offered the job to Dexter, who accepted it; he also captained England in the last two Tests against Pakistan. The Gentlemen v Players match ended in a draw, but Wisden was in no doubt that Trueman's professionals would have won convincingly if rain had not prematurely curtailed the proceedings.

The 17-man squad was duly selected with no real surprises, except possibly the omission of Tony Lock, but he had been out of form in the 1962 season. Lock had something of a last word, however, because he was hired by Western Australia as their overseas player for the winter and he helped the Combined XI defeat MCC at the WACA Ground. He went on to captain the state team from 1963–64 to 1970–71. One problem role was wicket-keeper. England had not had a settled keeper since Godfrey Evans and, as Gordon Ross said, it was "a department in which the selectors seem to vacillate more than in most". They chose John Murray who had been first choice for the 1961 Ashes series and his backup was Alan Smith who had yet to play Test cricket.

The Duke of Norfolk was chosen as team manager with Alec Bedser as his assistant. Norfolk was a surprise choice but he was a former MCC president and a keen patron of cricket in Sussex. It had been expected that Billy Griffith as MCC secretary would manage the tour but he needed to remain at Lord's to oversee the abolition of amateur status and the introduction of one-day cricket. Norfolk had to return to Britain for a month during the tour and Griffith flew out as his interim replacement.

Alec Bedser had last played for England in 1955 (he retired from first-class cricket in 1960) and his career total of 236 Test wickets remained a world record. As the 1962–63 series began, it seemed certain that Bedser would see his record being broken. Brian Statham had 229 Test wickets, Richie Benaud 219 and Fred Trueman 216. In the fourth Test at the Adelaide Oval, Statham took his 237th wicket when he had Barry Shepherd caught in the gully by Trueman. When the series ended, Statham had 242 wickets. Trueman and Benaud were both tied with Bedser on 236. Statham soon lost the record as he did not play in the New Zealand series, where Trueman took another 14 wickets to overtake him and extend the record to 250.

== England squad ==
MCC selected a squad of 17 players. The tour was managed by the Duke of Norfolk with the assistance of Billy Griffith and Alec Bedser. Ted Dexter was the team captain with Colin Cowdrey as his vice-captain. The table gives the name, county club, age (i.e., on 1 October 1962) and on field roles of each player:

Batsmen
Name	County club	Birth date	Batting style	Bowling style	Ref
Ken Barrington	Surrey	24 November 1930 (aged 31)	right-handed	right arm leg break and googly	
Colin Cowdrey	Kent	24 December 1932 (aged 29)	right-handed	none	
Ted Dexter	Sussex	15 May 1935 (aged 27)	right-handed	right arm medium pace	
Tom Graveney	Worcestershire	16 June 1927 (aged 35)	right-handed	none	
Peter Parfitt	Middlesex	8 December 1936 (aged 25)	left-handed	right arm medium pace	
Geoff Pullar	Lancashire	1 August 1935 (aged 27)	left-handed	none	
David Sheppard	Sussex	6 March 1929 (aged 33)	right-handed	slow left arm orthodox	

All-rounders
Name	County club	Birth date	Batting style	Bowling style	Ref
Ray Illingworth	Yorkshire	8 June 1932 (aged 30)	right-handed	right arm off break	
Barry Knight	Essex	18 February 1938 (aged 24)	right-handed	right arm fast medium	
Fred Titmus	Surrey	24 November 1932 (aged 29)	right-handed	right arm off break	

Wicket-keepers
Name	County club	Birth date	Batting style	Bowling style	Ref
John Murray	Middlesex	1 April 1935 (aged 27)	right-handed	none	
Alan Smith	Warwickshire	25 October 1936 (aged 25)	right-handed	none	

Bowlers
Name	County club	Birth date	Batting style	Bowling style	Ref
David Allen	Gloucestershire	29 October 1935 (aged 26)	right-handed	right arm off break	
Len Coldwell	Worcestershire	10 January 1933 (aged 29)	right-handed	right arm fast medium	
David Larter	Northamptonshire	24 April 1940 (aged 22)	right-handed	right arm fast	
Brian Statham	Lancashire	17 June 1930 (aged 32)	left-handed	right arm fast	
Fred Trueman	Yorkshire	6 February 1931 (aged 31)	right-handed	right arm fast	

England used 16 of their 17 players in the series. Larter was the only one to miss out on selection. Seven players took part in all five Tests. The leading batsman was Barrington with 582 runs at 72.75 per innings. The leading bowler was Trueman with 20 wickets at 26.05 runs per wicket.

== Australia Test selections ==
Australia, captained by Richie Benaud, selected a total of 15 players in the five Tests. Eight players took part in all five matches. Details of each Australian player includes the state he represented in 1962–63, his age on 1 October 1962, his batting hand and his style of bowling:

Batsmen
Name	State team	Birth date	Batting style	Bowling style	Ref
Bill Lawry	Victoria	11 February 1937 (aged 25)	left-handed	left arm medium pace	
Bob Simpson	New South Wales	3 February 1936 (aged 26)	right-handed	right arm leg break and googly	
Neil Harvey	New South Wales	8 October 1928 (aged 33)	left-handed	right arm off break	
Brian Booth	New South Wales	19 October 1933 (aged 28)	right-handed	right arm medium pace	
Peter Burge	Queensland	17 May 1932 (aged 30)	right-handed	right arm medium pace	
Norm O'Neill	New South Wales	19 February 1937 (aged 25)	right-handed	right arm leg break	
Barry Shepherd	Western Australia	23 April 1937 (aged 25)	left-handed	right arm off break	

All-rounders
Name	State team	Birth date	Batting style	Bowling style	Ref
Richie Benaud	New South Wales	6 October 1930 (aged 31)	right-handed	right arm leg break and googly	
Alan Davidson	New South Wales	14 June 1929 (aged 33)	left-handed	left arm fast medium	
Ken Mackay	Queensland	24 October 1925 (aged 36)	left-handed	right arm medium pace	

Wicket-keepers
Name	State team	Birth date	Batting style	Bowling style	Ref
Wally Grout	Queensland	30 March 1927 (aged 35)	right-handed	none	
Barry Jarman	South Australia	17 February 1936 (aged 26)	right-handed	none	

Bowlers
Name	State team	Birth date	Batting style	Bowling style	Ref
Graham McKenzie	Western Australia	24 June 1941 (aged 21)	right-handed	right arm fast	
Neil Hawke	South Australia	27 June 1939 (aged 23)	right-handed	right arm medium fast	
Colin Guest	Victoria	7 October 1937 (aged 24)	right-handed	right arm fast medium	

Australia's leading batsman on average was Burge with 245 runs at 61.25 per innings. He played in only three matches and the leading runscorer was Booth with 404 at 50.50 per innings. The leading bowler was Davidson with 24 wickets at 20.00 runs per wicket.

== Tour itinerary ==
The following is a list of the 28 matches played by England/MCC in Ceylon and Australia (see English cricket team in New Zealand in 1962–63 for the New Zealand matches). 15 are rated as first-class fixtures. Test matches are listed in bold. The matches in italics were not first-class. (Note: In 1962–63, all first-class matches in Australia apart from Test matches were of four days' duration and were all played either Saturday to Wednesday or Friday to Tuesday with no Sunday play. The five-day Test matches were played Friday to Wednesday or Saturday to Thursday with no Sunday play.)

Date	Match title	Venue	Result	Source
3 October	Ceylon v MCC	Colombo Oval, Colombo	match drawn	
16–17 October	Western Australia Country XI v MCC	Kalgoorlie Oval, Kalgoorlie	match drawn	
19–23 October	Western Australia v MCC	WACA Ground, Perth	MCC won by 10 wickets	
26–30 October	Combined XI v MCC	WACA Ground, Perth	Combined XI won by 10 wickets	
2–6 November	South Australia v MCC	Adelaide Oval	match drawn	
9–13 November	An Australian XI v MCC	Melbourne Cricket Ground	match drawn	
14 November	South Australian Country XI v MCC	Exies Oval, Griffith	MCC won by 7 wickets	
16–20 November	New South Wales v MCC	Sydney Cricket Ground	New South Wales won by an innings and 80 runs	
23–27 November	Queensland v MCC	Brisbane Cricket Ground	match drawn	
28 November	Queensland Country XI v MCC	Athletic Oval, Toowoomba	MCC won by 7 wickets	
**30 November –** **5 December**	**Australia v England (1st Test)**	**Brisbane Cricket Ground**	**match drawn**	
7–8 December	Queensland Country XI v MCC	Sports Reserve, Townsville	MCC won by an innings and 120 runs	
10–11 December	Victorian Country XII v MCC	Queen Elizabeth II Oval, Bendigo	match drawn	
12 December	Victorian Country XII v MCC	Deakin Reserve, Shepparton	MCC won by 6 wickets	
14–18 December	Victoria v MCC	Melbourne Cricket Ground	MCC won by 5 wickets	
20 December	South Australian Country XI v MCC	Centenary Oval, Port Lincoln	MCC won by 10 wickets	
22–27 December	South Australia v MCC	Adelaide Oval	match drawn	
**29 December –** **2 January**	**Australia v England (2nd Test)**	**Melbourne Cricket Ground**	**England won by 7 wickets**	
4–7 January	Combined XI v MCC	North Tasmania Cricket Association Ground, Launceston	MCC won by 313 runs	
8–9 January	Tasmania v MCC	Tasmania Cricket Association Ground, Hobart	match drawn	
**11–16 January**	**Australia v England (3rd Test)**	**Sydney Cricket Ground**	**Australia won by 8 wickets**	
18–21 January	New South Wales Country XI v MCC	No 1 Sports Ground, Newcastle	MCC won by 145 runs	
**25–30 January**	**Australia v England (4th Test)**	**Adelaide Oval**	**match drawn**	
1–5 February	Victoria v MCC	Melbourne Cricket Ground	match drawn	
6 February	Prime Minister's XI v MCC	Manuka Oval, Canberra	MCC won by 3 runs	
8–9 February	New South Wales Country XI v MCC	Victoria Park, Dubbo	match drawn	
11–12 February	New South Wales Country XI v MCC	Tamworth No 1 Oval, Tamworth	MCC won by 10 wickets	
**15–20 February**	**Australia v England (5th Test)**	**Sydney Cricket Ground**	**match drawn**	

== Test series ==
Australia and England played five Tests between 30 November 1962 and 20 February 1963. The series ended 1–1 with three matches drawn:

- 1st Test at Brisbane – match drawn
- 2nd Test at Melbourne – England won by 7 wickets
- 3rd Test at Sydney – Australia won by 8 wickets
- 4th Test at Adelaide Oval – match drawn
- 5th Test at Sydney – match drawn

=== First Test – Brisbane ===
30 November
– 5 December 1962
scorecard

Australia	v	England
404; Brian Booth 112; Barry Knight 3/65		389; Peter Parfitt 80; Richie Benaud 6/115
362/4 (dec); Bill Lawry 98; Ted Dexter 2/78		278/6; Ted Dexter 99; Alan Davidson 3/43

Match drawn
Brisbane Cricket Ground, Woolloongabba, City of Brisbane
Umpires: Colin Egar (AUS) & Ted Wykes (AUS)

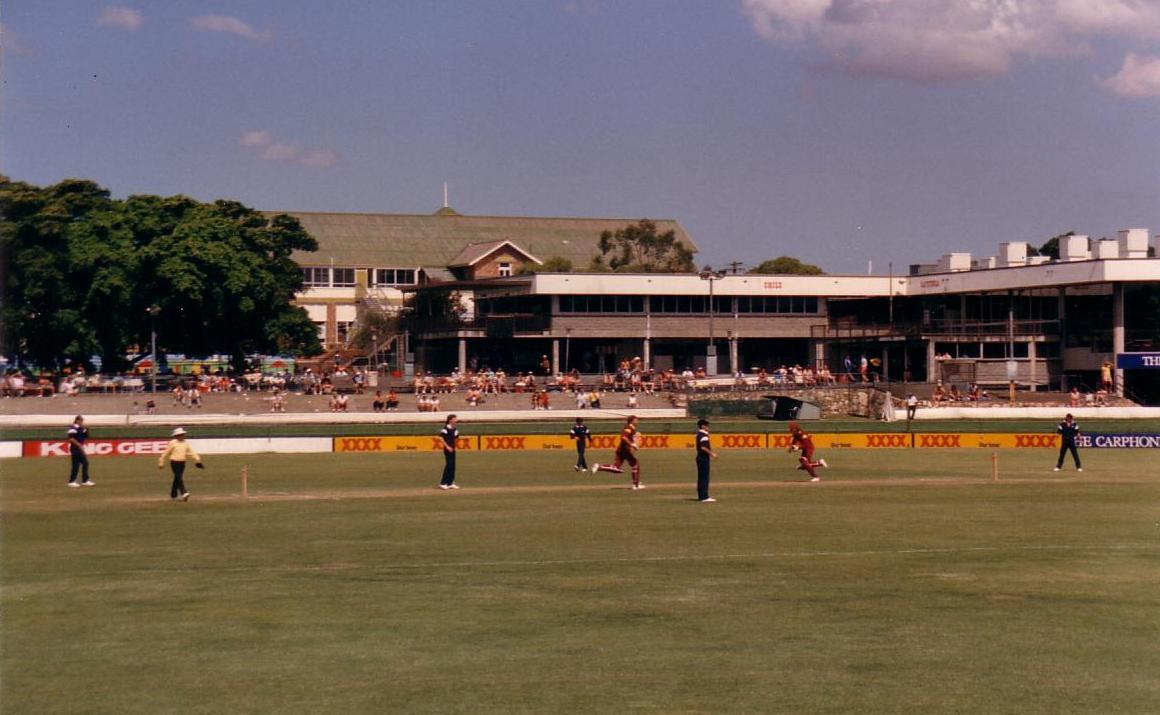
Brisbane Cricket Ground ("The Gabba") prior to redevelopment in the 1990s

Wisden pointed out that this match was the first Ashes Test at Brisbane to end in a draw. Their view was that a draw was a fair result because, while Australia went close to winning, England deserved something from the match for a fighting performance. Alan Smith made his Test debut for England. Richie Benaud won the toss and decided to bat but Australia struggled to reach 194/6 against a fine performance by Fred Trueman who took three of the wickets and held two catches. At that point, Brian Booth was joined by Ken Mackay and a recovery began. Booth's fluent innings ended on the first day after he had scored 112. Mackay and Benaud then built a partnership of 91 and Australia eventually totalled 404 all out.

Geoff Pullar and David Sheppard got England off to a decent start with an opening partnership of 62, after which both were dismissed within a few deliveries of each other. Although England struggled against Benaud, who took six wickets, they finally reached a creditable 389 all out after half-centuries by Peter Parfitt, Ken Barrington and Ted Dexter. Australia, leading by 15 on first innings, hoped to make a big score on the fourth day but by then the pitch had become very slow. They reached 362/4 at close of play and Benaud decided to declare immediately on the final morning. England needed 378 to win in six hours but they were never up with the clock despite some good batting by Pullar, Sheppard and Dexter. With half an hour left, England were 261/6 and Benaud crowded the bat to try and capture the last four wickets. Barry Knight and Fred Titmus held firm, however, and the result was a draw.

=== Second Test – Melbourne ===
29 December 1962
– 3 January 1963
scorecard

Australia	v	England
316; Bill Lawry 52; Fred Titmus 4/43		331; Colin Cowdrey 113; Alan Davidson 6/75
248; Brian Booth 103; Fred Trueman 5/62		237/3; David Sheppard 113; Graham McKenzie 1/58

England won by 7 wickets
Melbourne Cricket Ground, Melbourne
Umpires: Colin Egar (AUS) & Bill Smyth (AUS)

Wisden described the match as a "thrilling struggle throughout" and England won by seven wickets with 75 minutes to spare. Australia were unchanged from the first Test, while England introduced Tom Graveney and Len Coldwell in place of Peter Parfitt and Barry Knight.

Australia struggled on the first day and were 164/6 at one point but reached 263/7 at the close. Chasing 316, England quickly slumped to 19/2 but were rescued by a partnership of 175 between Cowdrey (113) and Dexter (93). Their hopes of a big lead were dashed by the fine bowling of Alan Davidson and there was little to choose between the teams as Australia began their second innings during the third day. Trueman dismissed Bob Simpson and Norm O'Neill in successive deliveries and Australia reached 105/4 at the close. Bill Lawry and Booth managed to stay together until just before lunch on day four but their scoring was very slow. Booth reached another century but the new ball came due and Trueman wiped out the tail. England needed 234 to win in just over a day. Sheppard shared in two century partnerships and scored 113 himself before being run out while going for the winning run, which was soon accounted for after he departed.

=== Third Test – Sydney ===
11–15 January 1963
scorecard

England	v	Australia
279; Colin Cowdrey 85; Bob Simpson 5/57		319; Bob Simpson 91; Fred Titmus 7/79
104; Peter Parfitt 28; Alan Davidson 5/25		67/2; Bob Simpson 34*; Fred Trueman 2/20

Australia won by 8 wickets
Sydney Cricket Ground, Sydney
Umpires: Lou Rowan (AUS) & Bill Smyth (AUS

This Test saw a complete turnaround from the previous one as Australia won by 8 wickets soon after lunch on the fourth day to level the series. Tom Graveney was a late withdrawal from the England team because of a virus and Peter Parfitt was recalled. John Murray replaced Alan Smith as wicket-keeper. Australia left out Peter Burge and Ken Mackay for Barry Shepherd and Colin Guest to make their Test debuts.

England won the toss and scored 279. Early in the Australian first innings, Murray injured his shoulder when diving to take a catch which dismissed Bill Lawry. Murray could no longer field and Parfitt kept wicket. Their Middlesex colleague Fred Titmus was in fine form with the ball and took 7/79, including one spell of 4/5 in 58 deliveries. Even so, Australia took a first innings lead of 40 and then, thanks to an outstanding new ball spell by Alan Davidson, bowled England out for only 104. Australia easily accounted for the target of 65 and finished on 67/2.

=== Fourth Test – Adelaide ===
25–30 January 1963
scorecard

Australia	v	England
393; Neil Harvey 154; Brian Statham 3/66		331; Ken Barrington 63; Graham McKenzie 5/89
293; Brian Booth 77; Fred Trueman 4/60		223/4; Ken Barrington 132*; Ken Mackay 1/13

Match drawn
Adelaide Oval, Adelaide
Umpires: Colin Egar (AUS) & Alan Mackley (AUS

Wisden commented on a "stalemate" scenario in this match which was caused by both sides being more worried about losing than trying to win. Australia recalled Ken Mackay in place of Colin Guest and Wally Grout, having recovered from his broken jaw, replaced Barry Jarman. England brought in Ray Illingworth for Len Coldwell. Having recovered from his virus infection, Tom Graveney returned in place of Peter Parfitt. A change of wicket-keeper was necessary because John Murray's shoulder injury had not improved so Alan Smith was recalled.

Australia won the toss and, after losing two early wickets, made 393 with centuries by Neil Harvey and Norm O'Neill. When Barry Shepherd was caught by Fred Trueman off Brian Statham, it was Statham's 237th Test wicket, beating Alec Bedser's world record of 236. England struggled against fine bowling by Graham McKenzie and were all out for 331. Australia were handicapped after Alan Davidson was injured and could not bowl. With that in mind, Richie Benaud decided against a declaration and Australia batted until they were all out for 293 just before lunch on the final morning, a lead of 355. England needed to score 89 an hour to win. There was little chance of them achieving that but they still needed to make sure they did not lose the match and Ken Barrington saw to that with an innings of 132* in under four hours.

=== Fifth Test – Sydney ===
15–20 February 1963
scorecard

England	v	Australia
321; Ken Barrington 101; Alan Davidson 4/43		349; Peter Burge 103; Fred Titmus 5/103
268/8 (dec); David Sheppard 94; Richie Benaud 3/71		152/4; Peter Burge 52*; David Allen 3/26

Match drawn
Sydney Cricket Ground, Sydney
Umpires: Colin Egar (AUS) and Lou Rowan (AUS

England had to win this match to reclaim The Ashes while Australia needed only a draw to retain them. The match ended as a draw and Wisden condemned it as "a dull, lifeless game which did immense harm to cricket". Alan Davidson and Neil Harvey both retired from Test cricket as the series ended.

== Ceylon v MCC (3 October) ==
The English team had a stopover in Colombo en route to Australia and played a one-day single-innings match on 3 October against the Ceylon national team, who at that time did not have Test status. The match was drawn after MCC scored 181/8 declared (David Sheppard 73; Abu Fuard 4/45) and Ceylon replied with 152/8 (C. I. Gunasekera 76; Ray Illingworth 5/59).

== Other first-class matches in Australia ==
=== Western Australia v MCC (October) ===
In addition to the five Tests, MCC played ten matches against state and combined teams. Their first against a state team was at the WACA Ground in Perth, 19–22 October. In this, they convincingly defeated Western Australia by ten wickets. They encountered Tony Lock who had joined Western Australia for the season on an overseas contract. Lock took a creditable 4/68 as MCC made 303 (Titmus 88, Dexter 76). Other than a defiant 41 by captain Barry Shepherd, Western Australia could not cope with a lively pitch and were all out for 77 (David Larter 4/25, Fred Titmus 3/11, Brian Statham 3/21). They followed on and scored 274 (Statham 4/49), so MCC needed 49 to win. Geoff Pullar and Colin Cowdrey made these without loss for a ten wicket win.

=== Combined XI v MCC (October) ===
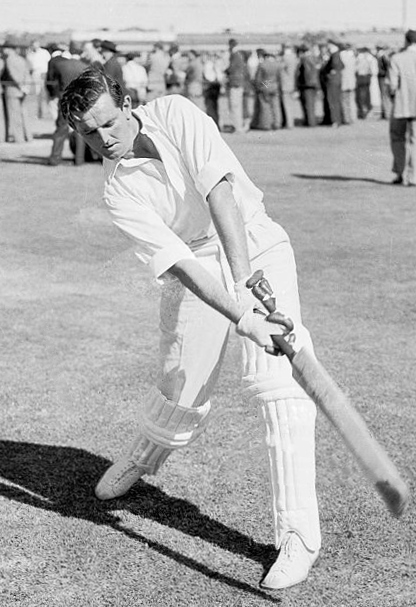
Tom Graveney was out for 99 at the Adelaide Oval

MCC remained in Perth and, four days later, faced a strong Combined XI which included Bob Simpson, Bill Lawry, Norm O'Neill, Barry Shepherd, Tony Lock and Graham McKenzie, plus five other Western Australia players. MCC failed to cope with rising balls outside the off stump and sixteen of their twenty wickets fell to catches by the wicket-keeper or one of the slips. Cowdrey, who opened both innings with Sheppard, suffered the indignity of a pair. Bob Simpson in contrast had an outstanding match with scores of 109 and 66* as the Combined XI won by ten wickets.

=== South Australia v MCC (November) ===
Leaving Perth, MCC were in Adelaide on 2 November to face South Australia and Gary Sobers at the Adelaide Oval. The match was drawn after rain interruptions. Although Cowdrey was out for a third successive duck, MCC responded well to the home team's 335 (Statham 4/58) with 508/9 declared (Titmus 137*, Barrington 104, Tom Graveney 99). South Australia cleared the deficit thanks to a fine innings by Sobers who then ran himself out on 99. With Sobers gone, South Australia were fighting to save the game but rain gave them respite. Captain Les Favell made a sporting declaration at 283/7, requiring MCC to score 111 in 67 minutes. Cowdrey opened with Pullar and managed to break his scoreless sequence. Pullar with 56 at a run a minute gave MCC a real chance of victory but the rain returned when they needed 16 more runs in nine minutes, and the result was a draw.

=== An Australian XI v MCC (November) ===
This match was played at the Melbourne Cricket Ground (MCG), 9–13 November. It was a high-scoring draw on what Wisden called a "perfect pitch for batting". MCC opened with 633/7 declared (Barrington 219*, Knight 108, Dexter 102, Cowdrey 88). It was the highest total by any English team on the MCG and five of the Australian bowlers conceded over 100 runs each. The select XI responded with 451 (Simpson 130, Shepherd 114) but Dexter did not enforce the follow on. He declared the second innings closed at 68/5 to try for an interesting finish, setting the select XI a target of 251 in 160 minutes. This was never likely to be achieved but, thanks to 91* by Shepherd, they had reached 201/4 when the match ended in a draw.

=== New South Wales v MCC (November) ===
New South Wales (NSW) won by an innings and 80 runs with a day to spare. Despite a resilient innings of 132 by Geoff Pullar, MCC struggled against the NSW spin bowlers to reach 348. NSW did not have the same problems and Bob Simpson (110) scored his third century in successive matches against the tourists. He and Norm O'Neill (143) shared a 2nd wicket partnership of 234. Good scores by each of the next five batsmen took NSW to 532/6 at lunch on the third day. Richie Benaud declared at that point and, by taking 7/18 himself (10/79 in the match), bowled MCC out for only 104 i just three hours.

=== Queensland v MCC (November) ===
Wisden said "a draw looked the obvious result" all through this match which was played on a pitch that offered nothing for the bowlers. Even so, much of the scoring was slow. Queensland declared their first innings at 433/7 with Ken Mackay scoring 105*. In reply, MCC built a huge 581/6 declared with Ken Barrington scoring 183*. Queensland struggled in their second innings but were never in any real danger of losing. Wes Hall hit his own wicket-keeper Wally Grout with one rising delivery and broke his jaw, which meant Grout could not play in any of the first three Tests.

=== Victoria v MCC (December) ===
MCC won by 5 wickets. It should have been an easy victory against a poor Victorian team but they were held up by Bill Lawry who batted for over seven hours and scored 177. Victoria were all out for 340 but MCC made hard work of things and were themselves all out for 336. They owed that to Geoff Pullar who scored 91 despite being injured and needing a runner. Queensland collapsed in their second innings after Lawry was run out and Len Coldwell helped himself to 6/49, taking four wickets with his last 26 balls. MCC needed 180 to win in four hours and made it with 40 minutes in hand after a good partnership between Sheppard and Cowdrey.

=== South Australia v MCC (December) ===
Match drawn. Colin Cowdrey had made three successive ducks in two of the early matches, but scored 307 in MCC's second match against South Australia in December, his highest first-class score. MCC scored 474/4 on the first day and went on to 586/5 declared. Cowdrey had great support from Tom Graveney (122*) in a fifth wicket stand of 344 in only four hours. Les Favell scored 120 and Gary Sobers 89 as South Australia replied with 450 all out. MCC declared their second innings on 167/6, setting South Australia a target of 304 in four hours. The end was ruined by rain but Sobers could still hit 75* in just over an hour.

=== Combined XI v MCC (January) ===
Played at Launceston, Tasmania, this match was something of a no contest as MCC won easily by 313 runs. They batted first and scored 331/7 declared. The Combined XI were all out for 77 after Fred Trueman and David Larter took four wickets each. MCC batted again for 116/1 declared. Rain almost ended the match but instead produced a sticky wicket on the last day. This was exploited to the full by spinners David Allen and Ray Illingworth who bowled the home team out for just 57.

=== Victoria v MCC (February) ===
The highlight of this match was a fine 185 by Tom Graveney in MCC's first innings of 375 after being 96/5. Victoria scored 307 (David Allen 5/43) and MCC declared their second innings at 218/5 to set a target of 287 in just over four hours. Victoria struggled to 188/9 and could only secure the draw after their last two batsmen, bowlers Keith Kirby and Alan Connolly, held out for the last sixteen minutes of play.

== Press coverage ==
There was considerable disquiet in cricketing circles about the press coverage of the tour which focused on the Duke of Norfolk because of his aristocratic connections and horse racing interests; on Sheppard for religious reasons; and on Dexter's wife Susan, who was a model. Playfair began its review of the tour with a curt dismissal of the excessive coverage as "all manner of events off the field of play (which are) copy for the newspapers". The England players were equally unimpressed and Fred Trueman disparagingly commented: "In no time at all, the news in the press concerning the England team centred on where the Duke of Norfolk's horses were running, what Mrs Dexter was wearing and where David Sheppard was sermonising".

The British writer Alan Ross wrote Australia 63 about his experience during the tour, consisting of typical sporting coverage of the significant matches with sections akin to a travel guide of the Australian locations he visited as he followed the tour by car. It was the third of four books he published regarding Ashes series.

== Bibliography ==
- A. G. Moyes and Tom Goodman, With the M.C.C. in Australia 1962–63, A Critical Story of the Tour, The Sportsman's Book Club, 1965
- E.W. Swanton, Swanton in Australia, with MCC 1946–1975, Fontana, 1977
- Fred Trueman, As It Was, The Memoirs of Fred Trueman, Pan Books, 2004

== Annual reviews ==
- Playfair Cricket Annual, 15th edition, editor Gordon Ross, Playfair Books, 1962
- Playfair Cricket Annual, 16th edition, editor Gordon Ross, Playfair Books, 1963
- Wisden Cricketers' Almanack, 100th edition, editor Norman Preston, Sporting Handbooks Ltd, 1963
- Wisden Cricketers' Almanack, 101st edition, editor Norman Preston, Sporting Handbooks Ltd, 1964
