= Wally Grout =

Australian cricketer

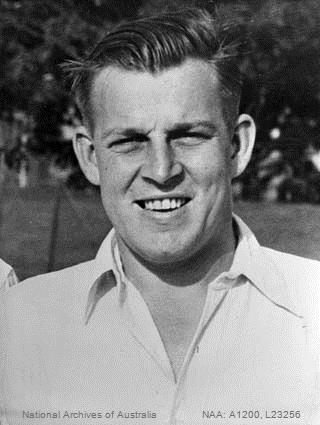
- Grout in 1957

Personal information
- Full name: Arthur Theodore Wallace Grout
- Born: 30 March 1927; Mackay, Queensland, Australia
- Died: 9 November 1968 (aged 41); Brisbane, Queensland, Australia
- Nickname: The Voice; Griz
- Batting: Right-handed
- Role: Wicket-keeper

International information
- National side: Australia
- Test debut (cap 206): 23 December 1957 v South Africa
- Last Test: 16 February 1966 v England

Domestic team information
- Years: Team
- 1946–1966: Queensland

Career statistics
Competition	Test	FC	LA
Matches	51	183	1
Runs scored	890	5,168	0
Batting average	15.08	22.56	–
100s/50s	0/3	4/25	0/0
Top score	74	119	–
Balls bowled	0	140	0
Wickets	–	3	–
Bowling average	–	38.33	–
5 wickets in innings	–	0	–
10 wickets in match	–	0	–
Best bowling	–	1/22	–
Catches/stumpings	163/24	473/114	0/0
- Source: CricketArchive, 10 December 2008

Arthur Theodore Wallace Grout (30 March 1927 – 9 November 1968), known as Wally Grout, was a Test cricketer who kept wicket for Australia and Queensland.

Grout played in 51 Test matches between 1957 and 1966. He made his Test debut against South Africa at Wanderers Stadium, during which he caught a record six wickets behind the stumps in the second innings.

For many years, Grout played second fiddle to Don Tallon in the Queensland state team, and was unable to cement a regular spot as wicket keeper until Tallon's retirement in 1953. In a Sheffield Shield match against Western Australia at Brisbane in 1960, he took 8 catches in an innings, setting a world record.

He died suddenly from a heart attack at the age of 41, only 3 years after ending his playing career. On 27 January 2016 Wally was inducted into the Australian Cricket Hall of Fame.

== Early years ==
Grout reported first becoming engrossed in cricket at age seven, seeing Australia international wicket-keeper Don Tallon play at Perry Park in Brisbane. He took to the game well and was later picked for Brisbane schoolboys as an opening batsman. However, future fellow Queensland Sheffield Shield player Leyland Sanders was preferred as wicket keeper. While at school, Grout played C Grade cricket for Valley and from age 14, for Souths, before settling at Toombul District Cricket Club – also the club of Don Tallon – where he was selected as wicket keeper in Tallon's absence. He also played Australian Rules and Rugby union.

== First class cricket ==
Grout's early nickname in Shield cricket was "The Voice", from his habit of joking and talking behind the stumps. He was unable to play in his favoured role as keeper due to the presence of Australian keeper Don Tallon. Grout described what he felt was his biggest setback in the 1947–48 season as Tallon was playing for Australia in the Test series against India; initially hopeful for the Queensland keeper spot, he was overlooked in favour of future Australian hockey captain Douglas Siggs.

Queensland state selector Vic Honour had reminded Grout that Siggs was a better batsman, but Grout disagreed, noting that the keeper is responsible for the runs of every wicket missed. He stated:

"I dropped Hassett in a Shield match at home in 1947 off spinner Mick Raymer before the perky little Victorian had scored. Lindsay said 'Ta' and thrashed 200. Where was I going to get a double century to compensate? My two innings in that match totalled seven runs."

Grout finally played as keeper for Queensland in 1949 as Tallon decided to switch to spin bowling. This lasted only one match, however; the selectors were unhappy and Tallon resumed keeping.

== Test cricket ==
Grout entertained hopes of playing for Australia against Len Hutton's English touring side in 1954, but Victorian Len Maddocks was selected, and played all five Tests despite having an injured finger. He was again overlooked as Gil Langley and Maddocks were the two keepers selected for the 1956 tour of England. His friend and fellow Queensland player Ken "Slasher" Mackay advised him that he lacked fitness, and that his form badly tailed off in the last session.

He improved his fitness and was one of two wicket keepers selected for the 1957–58 tour of South Africa. Grout's competitor for the Test spot was Barry Jarman, and to make matters worse, he had sustained a hairline thumb fracture. Downplayed the injury, he picked up 95 in an innings at Benoni and was given the nod. He made his Test debut in the first test against South Africa at Wanderers Stadium on 23–28 December 1957. Grout got off to a bad start, and allowed eight byes in the first innings in what he called "a severe attack of the fumbles". During the second innings, he was helped by some inspired bowling from Alan Davidson and took what was then a record six catches behind the stumps. Grout was impressed at the grounds and the hospitality on the South African tour, yet it was not without its risks; early on, some of the Australians (not Grout) were quoted in the local press as being unimpressed with the South African opening bowlers Adcock and Heine, this fired them up and Grout and teammate Les Favell copped a barrage of fearsome bowling in a match against Transvaal. The two fired down numerous bouncers against the Australians in the last innings of the fifth test. Grout and Neil Harvey faced danger of a different kind as the two were chased by elephants and lions in Wanke Games Reserve after Harvey left the vehicle attempting to get a better shot.

Australia never lost a series in which Grout played.

It was in South Africa that Neil Harvey gave Grout the nickname "Griz", referring to the keeper's habit of complaining ("grizzling") about poor returns from fieldsmen. This replaced the hated "Grouty"; once, when addressed this way by the then Prime Minister Robert Menzies, Grout had replied that the PM had just lost his and his wife's votes.

Grout played his first Test on home soil on 5 December 1958, in front of a home-town crowd at Brisbane; he was very nervous. Early in the match, he caught Tom Graveney off the bowling of Davidson, which was to be the first of twenty wickets he picked up for the series, equalling Don Tallon's record in Ashes series. Australia went on to win the series 4–0.

Grout then toured India and Pakistan over the 1959–60 summer, and captain Richie Benaud insisted Jarman play two tests as almost all games on the tour were Test matches. Upon return, much of the team were struck down with hepatitis, and the exhausted Grout and Ray Lindwall were the only two test players able to play for Queensland in a match against Western Australia, but during the match Grout picked up eight wickets in a single innings.

Grout had his jaw broken while keeping to Queensland's West Indian fast-bowler Wes Hall in their match against the MCC a week before the First Test of the 1962–63 Ashes series. He was replaced in the first three Tests by South Australia's Barry Jarman, who played only seven Tests until Grout retired in 1966. In 1964 he famously refused to run out Fred Titmus when he was knocked over by an Australian fielder in the 1964 Ashes series, but sportingly let him return to the crease.

Grout's last Test was played in the 1965–66 Ashes series. In the first innings of the Second Test he took 3 catches in an innings and although Australia lost the Third Test at Sydney by an innings Colin Cowdrey, M.J.K. Smith, Dave Brown and Jim Parks were caught by Grout off Neil Hawke in succession. Grout then snapped up Fred Titmus off Doug Walters to give him five catches in an innings. In the Fourth Test Cowdrey thought a shout by Grout was Ken Barrington calling him for a run and he was run out as England collapsed to 241 all out on the first day and lost by an innings, Grout taking 3 catches in the second innings. In the first innings of the Fifth Test he took 4 catches in his last Test to bring his total to 15 catches and 1 stumping in the series as Australia retained the Ashes with a 1–1 draw.

== Style and personality ==
Sir Don Bradman noted the similarity in footwork, "swoop" and aggression between Grout and Don Tallon.

Grout described Australian teammate Alan Davidson as his "bread and butter", and snared 48 of his first 100 victims from his bowling. He took plenty of outside edges from late-swinging balls. He hated keeping to off-spinners as the ball is often obscured by the batsman until it is too late; this is in contrast to leg spinners where the ball is visible from the time it is bowled.

"Asked by an Englishman if he'd attended a public school, he replied: "Eton. And drinkin'.""

Grout loved billiards, and met champion Indian billiards player Wilson Jones in Calcutta in 1960; the test team cheered Wilson in the World Amateur Billiards Championship, which was being held at the same time as the test.

In sports, prominent athletes often receive nicknames that then become widely used once they meet with popular approval. Grout's personality added his last name as a rhyming slang for a "Shout" (round). This poetic colloquialism arises in the context of drinking in a drinking establishment such as a pub, as in "And be sure to get your Wally Grout (shout) in." Here, a statement such as "It's your Wally" is a notification that it is the listener's turn to buy a round of drinks (a shout).

== Death ==
Grout ignored doctor's warnings about his weak heart and kept on playing until he was 39. He died from a heart attack less than three years later. His obituary in Wisden commented:

"Grout entered hospital only two days before his death. A Brisbane doctor was afterwards reported as saying that Grout knew that he might collapse at any time during the last four years of his Test career and that he took part in the Australian tour of the West Indies only a few months after a heart attack in 1964. Yet Wally's unfailingly cheerful demeanour gave no inkling that there might be anything amiss with him."
