= Barry Shepherd =

Australian rules footballer, cricketer

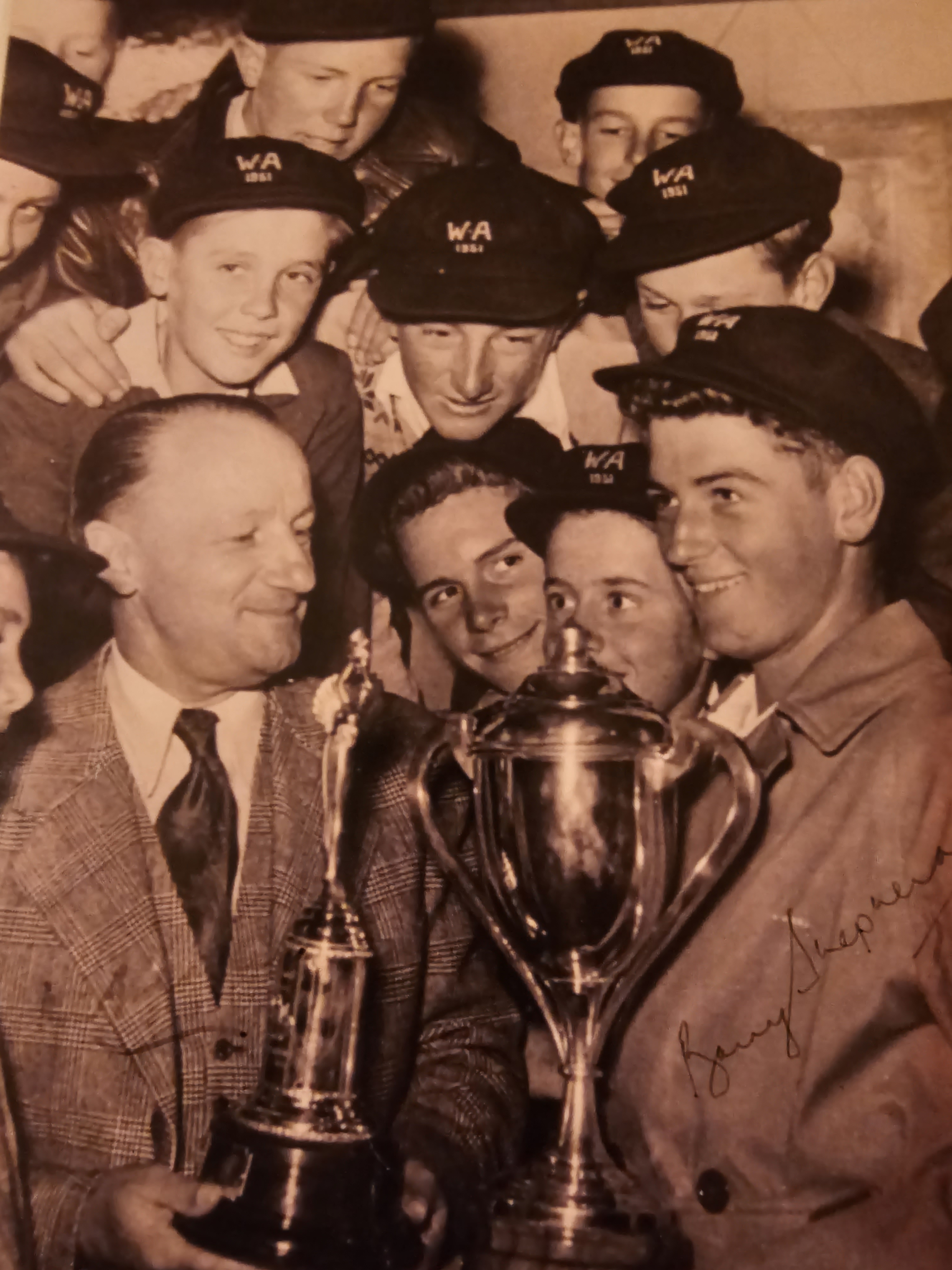
- Shepherd receives trophy from Don Bradman

Personal information
- Full name: Barry Kenneth Shepherd
- Born: 23 April 1937; Donnybrook, Western Australia
- Died: 18 September 2001 (aged 64); Fremantle, Western Australia
- Batting: Left-handed
- Bowling: Right-arm offbreak

International information
- National side: Australia
- Test debut (cap 223): 11 January 1963 v England
- Last Test: 14 May 1965 v West Indies

Career statistics
Competition	Test	FC
Matches	9	110
Runs scored	502	6,834
Batting average	41.83	41.16
100s/50s	0/5	13/36
Top score	96	219
Balls bowled	26	573
Wickets	0	4
Bowling average	–	85.75
5 wickets in innings	–	0
10 wickets in match	–	0
Best bowling	–	1/1
Catches/stumpings	2/–	72/–
- Source: Cricinfo, 26 March 2012

Barry Kenneth Shepherd OAM (23 April 1937 – 18 September 2001) was an Australian cricketer who played in nine Test matches from 1963 to 1965.

== Career ==
Barry Shepherd was an outstanding junior sportsman in Australian rules football, hockey and cricket. Twice representing Western Australia in schoolboy football, he won the medal for best player at the carnival on the first year of his selection (in Tasmania). He was runner-up for the same medal the following year (in Melbourne). The Richmond Football Club showed significant interest in recruiting him. He also represented Western Australia in hockey, winning all Australian selection as a full back.

Cricket was the sport which he decided to pursue, making his debut for Western Australia at age 17. He later captained the State with distinction. Known as a fierce competitor, he instilled in Western Australian cricket the will and self-belief which made subsequent on field success possible. He made his Test debut in the 1962–63 Ashes series, replacing Peter Burge in the batting line up. He made a vital 71 not out in the first innings when the England off-spinner Fred Titmus was running through the Australian batting order, taking 7/79. Ironically, the England team had tried to play Shepherd into the team and thought they had failed by getting him out cheaply in tour matches. He made only 23 more runs in the series and was replaced by Burge in the Fifth Test, but his 94 runs (47.00) put him third in the Australian batting averages.

Shepherd retired from cricket at the age of 28, at the conclusion of the 1965–66 season, to pursue a career in commerce. He later became a cricket administrator, being elected to the executive committee of the Western Australian Cricket Association (WACA) in 1979, and was awarded life membership of the association in 1985. In 1988, Shepherd was appointed a director of the Australian Cricket Board, a position in which he served until 2000, when he retired. Shepherd was awarded the Medal of the Order of Australia in 1999 for his services to cricket. He died in Fremantle on 18 September 2001, at the age of 64.
