= Leyland Sanders =

Australian sportsman

Personal information
- Full name: Leyland Arthur Sanders
- Born: 17 October 1927; Sandgate, Brisbane, Queensland
- Died: 3 January 2005 (aged 77); Forestville, Sydney, New South Wales
- Batting: Right-handed
- Role: Opening batsman

Domestic team information
- Years: Team
- 1950/51–1954/55: Queensland

Career statistics
Competition	First-class
Matches	10
Runs scored	255
Batting average	15.00
100s/50s	0/0
Top score	49
Catches/stumpings	9/–
- Source: CricketArchive, 20 April 2023

Leyland Arthur "Ley" Sanders (17 October 1927 – 3 January 2005) was an Australian sportsman who represented Queensland in both Australian rules football and Sheffield Shield cricket.

Sanders had a quick rise in Queensland football, becoming a regular interstate player after his first representative match in 1946. Although mainly a backman, Sanders was often used with success as a forward. He was club captain of Queensland Australian National Football League (QANFL) club Yeronga and then of Coorparoo-Yeronga, a merged outfit which competed in the 1953 and 1954 seasons. He won The Courier-Mail Best and Fairest Cup in 1954.

He started his cricket career as a wicket-keeper and had been a promising junior cricketer, captaining the Queensland Colts in 1949 and 1950. With Queenslander Don Tallon keeping wicket for Australia and future Test player Wally Grout the new state gloveman, Sanders was at best the third choice wicket-keeper for Queensland. As a result, he gave up the glovework and tried to get state selection as a specialist batsman.

It was as an opening batsman that Sanders was most often used by Queensland. He made his first-class cricket debut in the 1950/51 Shield season and was never able to become a regular fixture in the side, instead he was used more as a reserve batsman for Queensland, who filled a spot when a player was injured. His best effort with the bat came in the 1951/52 season, against Victoria, when he opened the batting and made 49. He missed out on his half century when he edged a ball from John Cordner to the keeper. After an absence of two years, Sanders played his 10th and final first-class match when he was called up as a middle order batsman for a Shield fixture against New South Wales. He suffered the indignity of scoring a pair and his dismissal in the second innings put debutant spinner Jack Treanor on a hat-trick, which he completed with the wicket of Peter Burge.
