= Mackley =

Mackley is a surname. Notable people with the surname include:

- Alan Mackley (1913–1982), Australian cricket umpire
- Arthur Mackley (1865–1926), English actor and film director
- Garnet Mackley (1883–1886), New Zealand businessman and politician
- Geoff Mackley, New Zealand photographer
- George Mackley (1900–1983), English wood engraver
- Ian Mackley (born 1942), British diplomat
- Shane Mackley, Australian rugby league player

== See also ==
- Carl Mackley Houses, apartment complex in Philadelphia, Pennsylvania
