= Colin Guest =

Australian cricketer (1937–2018)

- Colin Guest in 1962

Personal information
- Full name: Colin Ernest John Guest
- Born: 7 October 1937; Melbourne, Victoria, Australia
- Died: 7 December 2018 (aged 81); Melbourne, Victoria, Australia
- Batting: Right-handed
- Bowling: Right-arm fast

International information
- National side: Australia
- Only Test (cap 222): 11 January 1963 v England

Career statistics
Competition	Tests	First-class
Matches	1	36
Runs scored	11	922
Batting average	11.00	19.20
100s/50s	0/0	0/3
Top score	11	74
Balls bowled	144	6,645
Wickets	0	115
Bowling average	–	27.13
5 wickets in innings	0	5
10 wickets in match	0	1
Best bowling	–	7/95
Catches/stumpings	0/–	13/–
- Source: CricInfo, 21 December 2018

Colin Ernest John Guest (7 October 1937 – 7 December 2018) was an Australian cricketer who played in the Third Test at Sydney in the 1962–63 Ashes series. A fast-medium bowler, Guest played first-class cricket for Victoria from 1958–59 to 1963–64 and for Western Australia in 1966–67.

== Cricket career ==
During the 1962–63 season Guest took his best innings and match figures (7 for 95 and 10 for 134) for Victoria against Western Australia in Melbourne. He was brought in to the Test side to replace Ken Mackay. Guest was used to support Alan Davidson and Garth McKenzie. Although Australia won the Test, and Guest took part in an important partnership with Barry Shepherd for the tenth wicket, Guest failed to take a wicket and was dropped in favour of a return for Mackay. He maintained his good form at interstate level and, topping the Sheffield Shield averages with 39 wickets at 18.28, he helped Victoria to win the competition.

His form fell away in 1963–64 and he left for Western Australia, for whom he played one season in 1966–67. He scored 26 not out and 74 (his highest first-class score) in his first game for Western Australia and made some other useful contributions with the bat, but his bowling lacked its former penetration, and with strong competition for pace-bowling places in the state side from McKenzie, Sam Gannon, Laurie Mayne, Ian Brayshaw and Jim Hubble, he played no further first-class cricket after that season.

Guest died in a Melbourne hospital on 8 December 2018. As a mark of respect, the Australian team wore black armbands on the fourth day of their Test match against India at the Adelaide Oval.
