= Barry Knight (cricketer) =

English cricketer (1938–2025)

Personal information
- Full name: Barry Rolfe Knight
- Born: 18 February 1938; Chesterfield, Derbyshire, England
- Died: 10 November 2025 (aged 87); Bundanoon, New South Wales, Australia
- Batting: Right-handed
- Bowling: Right-arm fast-medium

International information
- National side: England
- Test debut: 1 December 1961 v India
- Last Test: 7 August 1969 v New Zealand

Career statistics
Competition	Test	First-class
Matches	29	379
Runs scored	812	13,336
Batting average	26.19	25.69
100s/50s	2/0	12/66
Top score	127	165
Balls bowled	5,377	57,813
Wickets	70	1089
Bowling average	31.75	24.06
5 wickets in innings	0	45
10 wickets in match	0	8
Best bowling	4/38	8/69
Catches/stumpings	14/–	263/–
- Source: CricInfo, 7 November 2022

Barry Rolfe Knight (18 February 1938 – 10 November 2025) was an English cricketer, who played in twenty-nine Tests for England from 1961 to 1969.

Cricket correspondent Colin Bateman remarked: "a flamboyant cricketer... [Knight] was an elegant middle-order batsman and a bowler with a sharp turn of speed who never appeared to run out of energy".

== Biography ==
Barry Knight was born on 18 February 1938 at Chesterfield in Derbyshire. He was a fast-bowling all-rounder who completed the cricketer's double (1,000 runs and 100 wickets in a season) four times, including the fastest accomplishment of the feat in modern times (two-and-a-half months). He won the World Single Wicket Title at Lord's in 1964.

Knight made his county cricket debut with Essex in May 1955, leaving that club at the end of the 1966 season for financial reasons to join Leicestershire. He emigrated to Australia at the end of the 1969 season, ending his career whilst still an England cricketer. He took 100 wickets in four seasons, and scored a thousand runs five times. He accomplished the double in each season from 1962 to 1965. In 1959, he missed the honour by a mere five runs. He made his highest first-class score, 165, against Middlesex at Brentwood in 1962.

His longest run at Test match level was the first six Tests he played in India and Pakistan in 1961–62. He was recalled nine times in a stop-start international career, but toured Australia twice in the 1962–63 and 1965–66 Ashes series, where he was a support bowler and lower-order batsman. His 240-run sixth-wicket partnership with Peter Parfitt against New Zealand in 1963 stood for almost forty years, until Graham Thorpe and Andrew Flintoff put the same opposition to the sword with their partnership of 281 in Christchurch in March 2002.

He was the first professional coach in Australia, starting in 1970 at an indoor facility in Sydney called Knights Inn and also was a very early user of video to record students batting and bowling. He was also the first coach to use video analysis, which led to his coaching over the past forty years of over twenty Test players, including Allan Border, Steve and Mark Waugh, Brett and Shane Lee, Adam Gilchrist, John Dyson, Andrew Hilditch and many New South Wales players. He coached over 20,000 young cricketers from 1970, and in later life remained involved in school holiday programmes, and with Mosman Cricket Club in Sydney. He held an ACB level 3 coaching certificate, and also a Marylebone Cricket Club (MCC) coaching certificate.

Knight died in Bundanoon, New South Wales on 10 November 2025, at the age of 87.
