= International cricket in 1964 =

International cricket season

The 1964 International cricket season was from May 1964 to August 1964.

== Season overview ==
International tours
Start date	Home team	Away team	Results [Matches]			
Start date	Home team	Away team	Test	ODI	FC	LA
4 June 1964	England	Australia	0–1 [5]	—	—	—
25 July 1964	Denmark	Netherlands	—	—	0–1 [1]	—
2 September 1964	England	West Indies	—	—	0–1 [3]	—

== June ==
=== Australia in England ===
The Ashes Test series
No.	Date	Home captain	Away captain	Venue	Result
Test 561	4–9 June	Ted Dexter	Bob Simpson	Trent Bridge, Nottingham	Match drawn
Test 562	18–23 June	Ted Dexter	Bob Simpson	Lord's, London	Match drawn
Test 563	2–6 July	Ted Dexter	Bob Simpson	Headingley Cricket Ground, Leeds	Australia by 7 wickets
Test 564	23–28 July	Ted Dexter	Bob Simpson	Old Trafford Cricket Ground, Manchester	Match drawn
Test 565	13–18 August	Ted Dexter	Bob Simpson	Kennington Oval, London	Match drawn

== July ==
=== Netherlands in Denmark ===
Two-day Match
No.	Date	Home captain	Away captain	Venue	Result
Match	25–26 July	Carsten Morild	Peter van Arkel	Aalborg Cricket Club Ground, Aalborg	Netherlands by 9 wickets

== September ==
=== West Indies in England ===
First-class series
No.	Date	Home captain	Away captain	Venue	Result
Match 1	2–4 September	Ted Dexter	Frank Worrell	North Marine Road Ground, Scarborough	Match drawn
Match 2	8–10 September	Ted Dexter	Frank Worrell	Edgbaston Cricket Ground, Birmingham	West Indies by 193 runs
Match 3	14–16 September	Trevor Bailey	Garfield Sobers	Lord's, London	Match drawn
