= International cricket in 1963 =

International cricket season

The 1963 International cricket season was from May 1963 to August 1963.

== Season overview ==
International tours
Start date	Home team	Away team	Results [Matches]			
Start date	Home team	Away team	Test	ODI	FC	LA
6 June 1963	England	West Indies	1–3 [5]	—	—	—
20 July 1963	Netherlands	Denmark	—	—	1–0 [1]	—

== June ==
=== West Indies in England ===
Wisden Trophy Test series
No.	Date	Home captain	Away captain	Venue	Result
Test 543	6–10 June	Ted Dexter	Frank Worrell	Old Trafford Cricket Ground, Manchester	West Indies by 10 wickets
Test 544	20–25 June	Ted Dexter	Frank Worrell	Lord's, London	Match drawn
Test 545	4–9 July	Ted Dexter	Frank Worrell	Edgbaston Cricket Ground, Birmingham	England by 217 runs
Test 546	25–29 July	Ted Dexter	Frank Worrell	Headingley Cricket Ground, Leeds	West Indies by 221 runs
Test 547	22–26 August	Ted Dexter	Frank Worrell	Kennington Oval, London	West Indies by 8 wickets

== July ==
=== Denmark in Netherlands ===
Two-day Match
No.	Date	Home captain	Away captain	Venue	Result
Match	20–21 July	R Colthoff	Carsten Morild	VRA Cricket Ground, Amsterdam	Match drawn
