= Alan Smith (cricketer) =

English cricketer

Personal information
- Full name: Alan Christopher Smith
- Born: 25 October 1936 (age 90); Hall Green, Birmingham, Warwickshire
- Batting: Right-handed
- Bowling: Right-arm fast-medium

International information
- National side: England
- Test debut: 30 November 1962 v Australia
- Last Test: 15 March 1963 v New Zealand

Career statistics
Competition	Test	FC	LA
Matches	6	428	82
Runs scored	118	11,027	594
Batting average	29.50	20.92	14.14
100s/50s	0/1	3/38	0/0
Top score	69*	145	39*
Balls bowled	–	7,158	1,038
Wickets	–	131	19
Bowling average	–	23.46	33.68
5 wickets in innings	–	2	1
10 wickets in match	–	0	0
Best bowling	–	5/32	5/19
Catches/stumpings	20/–	715/61	58/2
- Source: Cricinfo, 17 November 2022

Alan Christopher Smith CBE (born 25 October 1936), often known as A. C. Smith, is an English former Test cricketer, who appeared in six Tests matches for England. Primarily a wicket-keeper, Smith was also a capable right-handed middle-order batsman and right-arm seam bowler. Very unusually for a regular wicket-keeper, he was sometimes selected by Warwickshire as a frontline bowler.

He was in the last group of amateurs to play for England, before the Marylebone Cricket Club (MCC) abolished such a status.

== Life and career ==
Educated at King Edward's School, Birmingham and Brasenose College, Oxford, Smith scored his maiden first-class century (106, opening the batting) for Oxford University against the Marylebone Cricket Club (MCC) in 1958. He won blues 1957–1960, and captained Oxford University 1959–1960. Against Hampshire in 1959, Smith captained Oxford, kept wicket and scored centuries in both innings (145 and 124). Against the Free Foresters in 1960, Charles Fry's deputising as wicket-keeper allowed Smith to bowl himself; having never previously taken more than a single first-class wicket in an innings, he claimed figures of 5–32 and 4–45.

With Jim Parks, Jr. incumbent as England's wicket-keeper, Smith's international opportunities were limited to one tour of Australia and New Zealand under the captaincy of Ted Dexter in 1962–63. Smith failed with the bat in his four Tests against Australia; his score of 69 not out from number 10 in the Second Test against New Zealand, sharing a vital unbroken 163-run partnership with Colin Cowdrey to set up an innings victory, was his only batting contribution of note.

He succeeded M. J. K. Smith, to whom he was unrelated, as county captain of Warwickshire in 1965, retaining the post until his retirement at the end of the 1974 season. Against Essex in 1965 he achieved the very rare feat of taking a hat-trick as bowler in a first-class match in which he had been selected as a wicket-keeper. As the West Indian wicket-keeper Deryck Murray played for Warwickshire from 1972 onwards, Smith was seldom required to keep, and was hence able to bowl increasingly regularly towards the end of his career; in 1972 he took 5–47 against Glamorgan and 5–19 in a 40-over match against Northants. On one occasion, Smith was a member of a Warwickshire team which boasted three international wicket-keepers, none of whom were keeping wicket: Deryck Murray was injured, Rohan Kanhai had given up keeping, and Smith had been selected for his bowling, leaving occasional wicket-keeper John Jameson behind the stumps.

After retirement he became a leading figure in the game's organisation including spells as Secretary of Warwickshire County Cricket Club (1976–1986), as an England selector and Chief Executive of the Test and County Cricket Board (1986–1996).
