= Tony Lock =

English cricketer (1929–1995)

- Tony Lock in 1970

Personal information
- Full name: Graham Anthony Richard Lock
- Born: 5 July 1929; Limpsfield, Surrey, England
- Died: 30 March 1995 (aged 65); Perth, Western Australia
- Batting: Right-handed
- Bowling: Slow left arm orthodox

International information
- National side: England
- Test debut (cap 370): 17 July 1952 v India
- Last Test: 3 April 1968 v West Indies

Domestic team information
- Years: Team
- 1946–1963: Surrey
- 1962/63–1970/71: Western Australia
- 1965–1967: Leicestershire

Career statistics
Competition	Test	FC	LA
Matches	49	654	8
Runs scored	742	10,342	5
Batting average	13.74	15.88	1.00
100s/50s	0/3	0/27	0/0
Top score	89	89	3
Balls bowled	13,147	150,168	428
Wickets	174	2,844	10
Bowling average	25.58	19.23	27.00
5 wickets in innings	9	196	0
10 wickets in match	3	50	0
Best bowling	7/35	10/54	3/20
Catches/stumpings	59/–	831/–	3/–
- Source: Cricinfo, 8 September 2009

Graham Anthony Richard Lock (5 July 1929 – 30 March 1995) was an English cricketer, who played primarily as a left-arm spinner. He played in 49 Test matches for England taking 174 wickets.

Lock took 2,844 first-class wickets, placing him ninth on the all-time list, and is the only player to score more than 10,000 runs without once making a century; despite passing fifty on 27 occasions, his highest score was 89, made in a Test in Guyana. His tally of 831 catches in first-class cricket, mostly taken at short leg, lies behind only W.G. Grace and Frank Woolley.

== Life and career ==
Born in Limpsfield, Surrey, Tony Lock had the weighty backing of HDG Leveson Gower and made his first-class debut for Surrey County Cricket Club at just seventeen years and eight days old on 13 July 1946, which made him the youngest ever to play for the county. However he did not play regularly until 1949. In 1951 he took 105 wickets, and broke the 100-wicket barrier every year up to and including 1962, on two occasions (1955 and 1957) claiming more than 200 victims.

Lock made his England debut in the third Test against India in 1952, and played the fourth and fifth Tests against Australia the following summer; he had in fact been picked for the first game, but had worn his spinning finger raw after being named in the team and had had to withdraw while it healed. However, England regained the Ashes and for his efforts Lock was named one of Wisden Cricketers of the Year in the 1954 edition of Wisden's Almanack. However, he also had to deal with accusations (not entirely unfounded) that he was a 'chucker', being called for throwing on more than one occasion. This was one of the grudges that many had against him, the other was his consistent Test selection over Johnny Wardle of Yorkshire.

In 1956, Lock was famously the bowler who took "the other wicket" when Jim Laker achieved his world-record 19–90 at Old Trafford against Australia, and two years later had an extraordinary summer of success against an admittedly poor New Zealand side, finishing with 34 wickets at an average of a mere 7.47 in the five-Test series. He was inconsistent abroad, however, failing completely on the 1958/59 tour of Australia, but again terrorising the New Zealanders in the same winter, with 13 wickets at under nine runs apiece. It was during the New Zealand leg of the tour that he saw himself on film. Shocked by what he saw, he remodelled his action. By 1961, he was back in the Test team against Australia.

Not included in the English team for the 1962–63 Ashes series, he played with great success for Western Australia, returning to play for that state each winter for the rest of his career.

Lock moved to Leicestershire in 1965, and was made captain for the following two seasons, taking the club to third place in the County Championship in 1967. In 1967/68 he was unexpectedly recalled by England because of an injury to Fred Titmus, and played in the last two Tests against West Indies. He was the last man called up to play for England who was not playing for a first-class county. Though not achieving any great success with the ball, he contributed to the cause in another way, by making his highest first-class score of 89 in the first innings of the final Test at Georgetown, Guyana. England had nine wickets down when the game (played over six days) finished, and claimed the series 1–0.

Lock's remaining playing career was spent entirely with Western Australia, and fittingly his last first-class wicket was that of an Australian Test player, Paul Sheahan.

== Retirement ==
After retirement he moved into coaching in Perth and London, and became an Australian citizen in 1982.

== Personal life ==
He married Audrey May Sage (1928/9–1994) in September 1949. They had two sons and adopted a daughter.

== Assault allegations ==
Late in life Lock faced two separate charges of sexual abuse. In December 1993 he was found not guilty by a 10–2 majority of indecently assaulting a fifteen-year-old girl after inviting her to his home in Perth for a bowling lesson in 1987, including placing her hand on the clothing covering his penis. Lock admitted to kissing the girl in a "friendly" manner but denied any sexual intent and refuted her allegation that he recommended she bowl in the nude.

The following day he was charged with four counts of indecent assault on a girl aged ten some time between 1980 and 1981. Lock asked for a permanent stay on the grounds he was dying of lung cancer with several doctors confirming he would be dead within two years. However the judge allowed the trial to go ahead. The jury deliberated for eight hours but was unable to come to a verdict. Plans for retrial were eventually dropped due to Lock's ill health. He died from cancer in his adopted home town of Perth at the age of 65.
