= Peter Burge (cricketer) =

Australian cricketer

Peter Burge AM
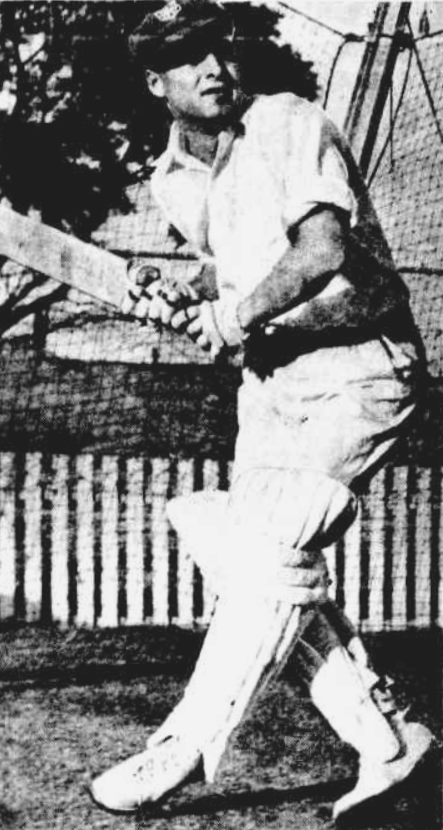

Personal information
- Full name: Peter John Parnell Burge
- Born: 17 May 1932; Kangaroo Point, Brisbane, Queensland, Australia
- Died: 5 October 2001 (aged 69); Southport, Queensland, Australia
- Batting: Right-handed
- Bowling: Right-arm medium

International information
- National side: Australia
- Test debut (cap 200): 25 February 1955 v England
- Last Test: 28 January 1966 v England

Domestic team information
- Years: Team
- 1952/53–1967/68: Queensland

Career statistics
Competition	Test	First-class
Matches	42	233
Runs scored	2,290	14,640
Batting average	38.16	47.53
100s/50s	4/12	38/68
Top score	181	283
Balls bowled	–	195
Wickets	–	1
Bowling average	–	129.00
5 wickets in innings	–	0
10 wickets in match	–	0
Best bowling	–	1/0
Catches/stumpings	23/0	166/4
- Source: CricketArchive, 28 December 2013

Peter John Parnell Burge AM (17 May 1932 – 5 October 2001) was an Australian cricketer who played in 42 Test matches between 1955 and 1966. After retiring as a player he became a highly respected match referee, overseeing 25 Tests and 63 One Day Internationals.

He was a Wisden Cricketer of the Year in 1965 and in 1997 was made a Member of the Order of Australia (AM) "for service to cricket as a player, administrator and international referee, and to harness racing."

== Early life ==
Burge was born in Kangaroo Point, Queensland, a suburb of the city of Brisbane, into a cricketing family. His father Thomas John "Jack" Burge was a salesman who rose to be a departmental manager of D. & W. Murray, a retail outlet, before becoming a state representative for Nile Industries, a textile firm. Jack Burge represented Eastern Suburbs in Brisbane's grade cricket competition and later became a cricket administrator. The elder Burge served on the Queensland Cricket Association executive from 1945 until his death in 1957. He also represented Queensland on the Australian Board of Control from 1952 until 1957 and was a state selector from 1944 until 1949. Peter recalled "My dad was the best frustrated Test cricketer I ever knew. He always wanted to play, was involved in it for as long as I could remember."

Burge was inculcated with a love of cricket by his father, who reputedly gave him a rattle in the shape of a ball and bat when he was a baby. First holding a bat at the age of three, Burge infuriated his mother by striking a ball wrapped in a sock and tied to a rope, for hours on end. Aged five, he went to Buranda Boys' State School and due to his father's coaching, was by far the best cricketer at the school. He played his first competitive match when he was eight and a half, and scored his first century at nine. At the age of nine, Burge scored 223 for Buranda and then decided to retire because of extreme heat. His father berated him for handing the opposition his wicket. Burge said "It was good advice. I never did it again."

In his final year at primary school, playing as an opening batsman and wicketkeeper, he scored a double century, eight centuries, 97 and 0 in 11 innings.

Aged thirteen he moved to Anglican Church Grammar School, one of the state's elite private schools, and represented Queensland in a schoolboy competition in Sydney, scoring 100 against Victoria. He played in the first XI in his final three years and made his first-grade debut in his final year. He remained a wicketkeeper and batted at number three. When he was considered for state selection, his father had to stand aside from the Queensland selection panel. Despite this, Burge's rise through the ranks is continuously accompanied by murmurs of nepotism. He studied chartered accountancy and was selected for the state U-23 side under the coaching of Wally Walmsley.

== Shield debut ==
At the time the Queensland wicket-keeper was Test player Don Tallon, member of Bradman's Invincibles, and the reserve was Wally Grout, later to become one of Australia's finest wicket-keepers. Burge decided to give up wicket-keeping and focus purely on batting. Burge progressed to make his Sheffield Shield debut in the Queensland's last match of the 1952–53 season against South Australia. Batting at seven, the first five wickets fell cheaply in each innings, but Burge made a rearguard 54 and 46 respectively. This prevented a defeat.

In the following 1953–54 season, Burge found a regular place and began the season in November with 103 against a New South Wales attack which included Ray Lindwall, Keith Miller and Richie Benaud. After failing to pass single figures in the next match, he scored 64 against South Australia, and then ended the season with 88, 47 and 65. In his first full season, Burge had scored 418 runs at 41.80.

He started the 1954–55 season in a similar fashion to the previous summer, scoring 122 in the opening match of the season against New South Wales. He scored 90 and 41 in the return match, and after making 53 in the next fixture, his steady progress was rewarded in 1954–55 when he was given his Test debut against England at Sydney in the Fifth Test. Australia had lost the series and this allowed selectors to give younger players a chance to show their skills. Unseasonal rain mean that play did not start until 2 p.m. on the fourth day.

== Test appearances ==
His first touch of the ball saw him catch Len Hutton at leg slip off the fourth ball of the match. As the players took to the field, Lindwall told him to watch for the fourth ball. Lindwall bowled three outswingers to Hutton, before an inswinger on the fourth. Hutton edged the ball to Burge who claimed the catch on the second attempt. Burge made 17 and 18 not out, as Australia were made to follow on after trailing by 150 runs. Australia were still 32 runs behind and facing a fourth consecutive Test defeat when time ran out. He had scored 379 runs at 42.11 for the season.

He was then selected for the 1955 tour of the West Indies, on which his father acted as manager of the squad. A team meeting was held to officially allow Burge to address his father as "Jack", as the other players did, instead of "dad". In the warm-up match against Jamaica, Burge made 29 and 69 and was selected in the First Test. He scored 14 in the first innings and was not required to bat in the second innings as Australia won by nine wickets. He then made a duck and 2 in the next tour match against Trinidad and was dropped for the remaining four Tests of the series, which Australia took 3–0. Burge's highlight of the tour was an innings of 177 against British Guiana, which set up an innings victory. He ended the first-class matches with 310 runs at 38.75. After the tour, Burge suffered a setback when his father began to develop the heart problems that eventually claimed his life. Nevertheless, the elder Burge insisted that his health not hinder his son's career.

Returning to Australia for the 1955–56 home season, which was purely domestic, Burge played in all but one of Queensland's eight Shield matches. In 12 innings, he made many starts but could not convert them into big scores. He reached 20 on eight occasions and converted four of these into scores between 50 and 65, going no further. He ended with 363 runs at 33.00. In the Test trial match, he played for Lindwall's XI against Johnson's XI and made 72 and 46 in a two-wicket win.

Despite the lack of big scores, Burge was selected for the tour of England in 1956, he made a successful start with a 99 in his first match on English soil against Leicestershire. After making a duck in the next fixture against Yorkshire, he compiled 131 against Nottinghamshire. He then made 61 against Cambridge University.

Despite totalling only 67 runs in the last four innings before the Tests, the retirement of Arthur Morris after the previous West Indies series opened a vacancy in the Australian batting order, and Burge was recalled. In the first three Tests, he could only manage 84 runs at 16.80, and after single figure scores in the Third Test at Headingley, trapped leg before wicket twice by the off spin Jim Laker on a very dry surface as Australia suffered their first innings defeat in 18 years, was dropped for the final two Tests. He was not productive in the tour games outside the Tests after the start of the Ashes series, making only four fifties in 12 innings and he was unable to earn a Test recall during the tour.

On the Test tour of the Indian subcontinent en route back to Australia, Burge was recalled after a defeat in the one-off Test against Pakistan in Karachi, as injuries and illness beset batsmen and all-rounders Ron Archer, Ian Craig and Keith Miller. He had his first full and consistent Test series. After making 35 in the opening match in Madras, which Australia won by an innings, he made his first half centuries at Test level, scoring 83 and 58 in the Second and Third Tests at Bombay and Calcutta respectively. He compiled 198 runs at 49.50 as Australia took the series 2–0. During the Indian leg of the tour, Burge's father suffered a heart attack, but any prospect of him returning home early was quashed by Jack's strident objections.

In the 1956–57 Australian season, scored consistently heavily for the first time at first-class level. He opened his campaign with centuries in consecutive matches against Western Australia and Victoria, and failing to convert his starts into large scores in the middle part of the season—he registered seven consecutive scores between 20 and 80—he registered his maiden first-class double century in the final match of the summer, 210 against Victoria, having been dropped first ball. He ended the Australian season with 718 runs at 71.80, despite a personal loss. During the season, Jack Burge suffered a fatal heart attack, forcing his son to retire mid-innings during a national trial match, which doubled as a testimonial for pre-World War II Test players Stan McCabe and Bill O'Reilly.

He toured New Zealand at the season's end and due to his keeping ability, Australia did not send a reserve for Barry Jarman. Burge said "Cricket had been so much a part of Dad's life that I think he would have wanted me to go." He started the tour with a 105 against Canterbury and later made 81 not out against Auckland, but did not otherwise pass 50. New Zealand had Test status at the time, but the Australian Board of Control refused to ratify the matches between the two nations as such. Burge had little impact in three international matches, scoring 115 runs at 28.75 as Australia took the series 1–0. He ended the New Zealand tour with 310 runs at 38.75.

At this stage of his career, Burge was scoring consistently enough to command a regular Test place. On the 1957–58 tour of South Africa, he made 111 not out against a South African XI in a warm-up for the Tests, and then made 80 in the next match against Border. He was selected in the First Test in Johannesburg. After scoring a duck and 14 in a drawn match, it was Burge who was dropped when vice-captain Neil Harvey returned from injury as Australia took the five-Test series 3–0. Burge scored only one further fifty in the tour matches and ended with 441 runs at 49.00.

At the start of the 1958–59 season, Burge made 74, 94 and 64 in his first three innings. Although he made only 25, 7 and 11 in the last three innings before the Tests, all against Peter May's touring Englishmen, national captain Ian Craig was ruled out due to hepatitis. This gave Burge a recall for the First Test against England in his home town of Brisbane. He made two in his only innings and was dropped again after Australia took an eight-wicket win. Returning to Queensland duties, he initially failed to capitalise on his starts, with four scores between 30 and 60 in five innings, before striking 101 and 171 against South Australia and Victoria respectively. However, this was not enough for him to gain a recall for the later Tests of the season. Burge ended with season with 764 runs at 50.93.

Afterwards, his accountancy firm declined to grant him further leave for cricket, but Burge backed his ability and quit his job, accepting the invitation to tour India and Pakistan in 1959–60. Test opener Jim Burke had retired after the England series, opening another batting position. He was in and out of the team throughout the tour. After making a duck in the First Test against Pakistan in Dacca, which Australia won by eight wickets, he was dropped for the Second Test before returning and scoring 12 in the drawn Third Test in Karachi. Australia took the series 2–0. He was overlooked for the first three Tests in India, but after illness struck as it did on the previous tour, Burge scored 157 against Indian Universities and was recalled for the final two Tests in Madras and Calcutta, scoring 35 and 60 respectively as Australia won the former by an innings and drew the latter to take the series 2–1.

At the start of the 1960–61 season, Burge again found himself outside the Test team. He made a series of starts in four matches for Queensland, reaching 15 in all eight innings but only managing two half-centuries with a top-score of 75. This changed in two fixtures over the Christmas and New Year period. He struck 240 in a ten-wicket win over South Australia and then made 103 and 55 in a low-scoring two-wicket win over Western Australia, scoring over 38% of his team's runs.

He was recalled for the Fourth Test against the West Indies and told his new employers he would retire if he did not make runs. He made 45 and 49 as Australia hung on for a draw in Adelaide with one wicket in hand, and before scoring 68 and 53 in the Fifth Test as Australia won to take the series 2–1.

Burge had a productive season in 1960–61 and led the Australian first-class batting averages at 53.75.

== Career consolidated ==
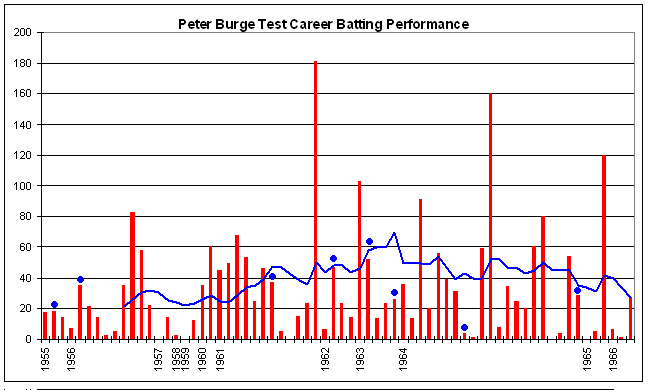
Burge's Test career batting performance

The 1961 Ashes tour to England was the first series in which Burge played in all five Tests. He rewarded the selectors by finishing second to Bill Lawry in the Test averages. In the county matches ahead of the Tests, Australia's preparation was interrupted by frequent rain, while some of Burge's innings were cut short when the tourists reached their victory target. These contributed to his first five innings being incomplete innings, one of which was a 101 against Lancashire. After a succession of low scores in the second half of May, Burge hit 158 against Sussex in the final county match before the Tests.

Burge made 25 in Australia's only innings in a high-scoring draw in the First Test at Edgbaston. Burge then scored 137 against Leicestershire between Tests and retained his position after captain Benaud was forced out with a shoulder rinjury.

In the Second Test at Lord's, known as the "Battle of the Ridge", he made 37 not out against the hostile pace of Fred Trueman and Brian Statham after Australia had slumped to 4/19 in pursuit of 69 on an erratic surface. He had earlier made 46 in difficult conditions in the first innings. After managing only 43 in the next two Tests, which were shared between the two teams, thereby allowing Australia to retain the Ashes 2–1, he finished the tour on a high. In the last match before the final Test, Burge scored an unbeaten 51 against Warwickshire, his first score of 50 or more in eight weeks—15 innings.

In the Fifth Test at The Oval he made his maiden Test ton with a 181. It was an innings marked by his persistent use of the sweep, taking balls from outside off stump through the leg side to disperse the packed off side field of David Allen and Tony Lock. He ended with 332 runs at 47.42.

Burge ended the tour with half-centuries in the last two first-class matches.

The 1961–62 Australian season was purely domestic, with no touring Test team. In the second match of the season, Burge started a run of centuries in three consecutive matches. He scored 101 and 68 against New South Wales, contributing more than one third of his team's runs in a 48-run defeat. In the following match he made 119 in the second innings to help Queensland overcome a 90-run first innings deficit and take a 31-run win. He then made 114 against Western Australia, but Queensland was unable to convert their 192-run lead on the first innings and the match ended in a draw. Burge added 82 in the final innings of the season and ended with 631 runs at 63.10.

Burge started the 1962–63 season with a half-century against New South Wales and 115 against Western Australia, but his formed tapered away at the start of the 1962–63 Ashes series against Ted Dexter's England. He made 6 in the first innings and was 47 not out when Benaud declared in the second innings of the drawn First Test in Brisbane. Burge then made 23 and 14 in the second innings as the hosts were defeated by seven wickets, and he was again dropped from the team. He returned to Queensland and scored 163 and 24 not out, and 33 and 54 not out in two matches against South Australia to earn a recall for the Fifth Test in Sydney. With the series tied at 1–1, Australia played conservatively for a draw and retention of the Ashes. Burge made 103 and 52 not out, to ensure a draw and a series victory. He headed the Australian Test averages with 245 runs at 61.25. Despite ending the Shield season with four consecutive scores of no more than 10, Burge finished the season with 787 runs at 52.46.

In 1963–64 he began the season with more than 500 runs in his first three innings. He started his campaign with 283 run out in a high-scoring draw against New South Wales, setting a new Queensland record. He then made 205 not out before Queensland declared in another drawn match, against Western Australia. A fortnight later, he hit 129 against the touring South Africans, helping to set up an innings win. By the time he was out, he had scored 617 runs for the season before being dismissed by a bowler.

This, along with the retirement of Australia's vice-captain and most prolific batsmen since the Second World War, Neil Harvey, secured Burge's place in all five Tests against South Africa, despite an injury during the season that required an operation on his left foot after the Tests.

After being run out for 13 in front of his home crowd in the First Test in Brisbane, Burge had a lean month-long run against the tourists. He made only 3 and 10 in a tour match for the Tasmania Combined XI, before scoring 23, 26 not out, 36 and 13 in the next two Tests. Australia won the Second Test before the next game was drawn. Unlike in previous season, Burge was not dropped, and he made 91 in the Fourth Test at the Adelaide Oval, which Australia lost by ten wickets, before scoring 56 and 39 in the last Test, which was drawn.

He had a steady if unspectacular series with 317 runs at 39.63 with two half centuries. After the Tests started, Burge found himself struggling to convert his starts into substantial scores. In the last 11 innings of the season, he reached double figures each time, and ended with eight scores ranging from 20 to 60. Burge ended the season with 1144 runs at 76.26.

The foot injury made him doubtful for the tour of England in 1964. After sitting out the closing stages of the domestic season after the Tests, he was selected, missed the warm-up matches in Australia before the team departed, and was restricted in his running during the early weeks of the tour. Burge scored 58 and 46 not out in the tour opener against Worcestershire but was not fluent in the lead-up to the Tests, making only one more half-century before the Tests.

Depleted by a bevy of retirements in the recent past, Australia were not expected to do well.

Burge went into the Tests with only 264 runs at 29.33 in the lead-in matches.

He was not prominent in the first two Tests; he made 31, 4 not out and 1, before making 59 at Lord's in the second innings of the Second Test. Australia were shortened by the weather and drawn with England holding the advantage.

Heading into the Third Test, Burge had also managed only 5, 18 and 5 in the county innings since the start of the Ashes.

His most notable innings was at Headingley in the Third Test. In reply to England's 268, Australia slumped to 7/178. Batting with the tail, Burge's sustained aggression saw Australia reach 389 on the back of his 160. It set up an Australian win, and in the only match of the series that was not drawn, secured Australia's series victory. Wisden described it as the innings that decided the series, and described it as "one of the best for many years".

In the last match before the Fourth Test, Burge narrowly missed out on a century at Lord's, the home of cricket, falling for 96 against Middlesex. In the Fourth Test at Old Trafford, Burge made 34 as Australia batted for more than two days in their first innings to secure a draw in a high-scoring match and retain the Ashes.

Burge then made 100 not out and 53, scoring more than a third of Australia's runs as they fell to a nine-run defeat at the hands of Warwickshire. In the drawn Fifth Test, Burge made 25 in Australia's only innings and did not pass 30 in the last three first-class matches.

As a result, he was named as one of the Wisden Cricketers of the Year in 1965. He ended the series with 322 runs at 46.00.

Burge signed off with an unbeaten 124 against Sussex in one of the ground-breaking limited-overs matches, then a new format of cricket.

On the return leg of the tour, he played consistently in three and one Tests against India and Pakistan respectively on a tour of the Indian subcontinent, scoring 266 runs at 44.33 with three half centuries. In the First Test against India, Burge made 60 in the second innings to help Australia erase a 65-run deficit and set up a match-winning target of 332. He then scored 80 and 0 in the next match as Australia lost by two wickets. After making 4 in the drawn Third Test, he made 54 and 28 not out against Pakistan in a one-off Test.

== Retirement ==
During the 1964–65 season, Burge made himself unavailable for the solitary home Test against Pakistan and the subsequent tour of the West Indies at the end of the summer.

He played a full domestic season, the first half of which was punctuated by near misses. In the first seven innings of the season, he reached 30 every time, but only reached 50 twice. On these occasions, he proceeded to 98 and 97 before falling short of a century. The latter innings helped Queensland overturn a 71-run first innings deficit and complete a 41-run win. In the New Year's match against New South Wales, Burge made an unbeaten 242 in the second innings to overturn a 212-run first innings deficit and set a target of 306, but his team were unable to finish off the match, ending one wicket short of victory when time ran out. Burge made another century in the next match and ended the season with 909 runs at 60.60.

The following season, Burge made himself available for international duty, and started the Australian summer with 111 against New South Wales. He made a pair of fifties in his next match, for a Western Australia Combined XI against the touring England team. Two matches later he scored 114 not out and 60 for Queensland against England, scoring more than half of his team's first innings total.

These performances were enough to ensure that Burge was recalled for the 1965–66 Ashes series in what was his final international campaign. In the First Test, his final appearance for Australia in Brisbane, he made a duck in his only innings of a drawn match. He then made his fourth and final Test century, 120 in the second innings of the Second Test in Melbourne, helping Australia to make 426 and avoid a defeat after conceding a 200-run lead on the first innings. He then made 6 and 1 as Australia were crushed by an innings in the Third Test before scoring 27 as Australia reversed the result in the next match. This was his last Test, as on the eve of the Fifth Test, he announced that he would not make the 1966–67 tour to South Africa and was subsequently relegated to 12th man so that other players could get international experience, ending his Test career. He had made 159 runs at 26.50 for the series.

While his compatriots were away in Africa, Burge played a final season of first-class cricket. He scored 50 and 60 in the opening match of the season, before scoring 198 in the next fixture against New South Wales. He scored an unbeaten 101 in the return match against Western Australia, failing to prevent an innings loss. Burge ended the season with 909 runs at 64.92, including two centuries and five fifties in eight first-class matches. Queensland won only the last match of the season, and lost three others.

At the end of the 1966–67 season, he toured New Zealand with Australia's second team. Apart from 102 in the fourth international match against the hosts, he failed to pass 35 in the representative games and ended with 198 runs at 39.60 as New Zealand took the series 1–0. He ended the tour with 379 runs at 37.90.

He retired at the end of the 1967–68 Australian season, after playing another six first-class matches. Queensland lost three games and won none. He made a century in his final match against Western Australia, which was not enough to prevent another defeat. He scored 319 runs at 39.87 in his final season.

Burge ended his Queensland captaincy career with only two wins from 28 matches, suffering 11 losses. During his career, Queensland was the weakest of the five states and failed to break through for their maiden Sheffield Shield win.

A heavily built man, Burge was a combative player who was regarded as quiet and genial off the field. An attacking player, he was known for his penchant for the hook shot and his ability against fast bowling. Burge is one of the few cricketers to be given out handled the ball. In a Shield match against New South Wales in 1958–59, the ball struck him on the pad and went up in the air. Unconsciously, he put up a hand and the ball landed in his palm.

Burge was a state selector from 1968 to 1979, and QCA vice president from 1990 to 1994, when he became a board member. He was a match referee for the International Cricket Council. During this time he was involved in a controversial issue in 1994 when England captain Mike Atherton was accused of ball tampering by rubbing it with dirt from his pocket during a match against a newly returned South Africa at The Oval.

Burge died of a heart attack in 2001 at Main Beach in Southport, Queensland.

In 2009 Burge was inducted into the Queensland Sport Hall of Fame. The Peter Burge Oval cricket ground in Brisbane is named in his honour.
