= Bill Smyth (umpire) =

Australian cricket umpire (1916–2007)

William Joseph Smyth AO (8 July 1916 – 16 September 2007) was an Australian Test cricket umpire.

== Life and career ==
Smyth was born at Maryborough, Victoria. He took up umpiring in 1947 when injury ended his fast bowling career, and umpired four Test matches between 1962 and 1966. His first Test match was between Australia and England at Melbourne on 29 December 1962 to 3 January 1963, won by England by 7 wickets. Smyth's partner in this match was Colin Egar.

Smyth stood (again with Egar) in the first Test match played by Pakistan in Australia, at Melbourne on 4 December to 8 December 1964, a match drawn when Australia required only 78 further runs with 8 wickets in hand. This was Ian Chappell's debut match.

Smyth's last Test match, also against England at Melbourne with Egar as his colleague, took place exactly three years after his first, on 30 December 1965 to 4 January 1966, resulting in a draw. He continued to umpire at first-class level until 1972. In all he umpired 59 first-class matches between 1956 and 1972, all but one of them in Melbourne.

On retirement, Smyth became a long-term President of the Victorian Cricket Association Umpires' Association, adviser to the panel of VCA umpires, and lecturer on the Laws of Cricket, providing precise explanations of the complex code. He was awarded the Order of Australia in 2002 for his services to cricket.

Smyth died in Melbourne at the age of 91. At the time he was the oldest living Test match umpire.

== See also ==
- Australian Test Cricket Umpires
- List of test umpires
