= Grahame Corling =

Australian cricketer (born 1941)

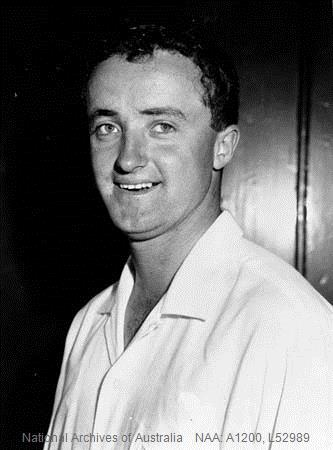
- Corling in 1965

Personal information
- Full name: Grahame Edward Corling
- Born: 13 July 1941 (age 85); Waratah, New South Wales, Australia
- Height: 183 cm (6 ft 0 in)
- Batting: Right-handed
- Bowling: Right-arm fast-medium
- Role: Bowler

International information
- National side: Australia
- Test debut (cap 228): 4 June 1964 v England
- Last Test: 13 August 1964 v England

Career statistics
| Competition | Test | First-class |
|---|---|---|
| Matches | 5 | 65 |
| Runs scored | 5 | 484 |
| Batting average | 1.66 | 10.52 |
| 100s/50s | 0/0 | 0/0 |
| Top score | 3 | 42* |
| Balls bowled | 1,159 | 12,764 |
| Wickets | 12 | 173 |
| Bowling average | 37.25 | 32.05 |
| 5 wickets in innings | 0 | 6 |
| 10 wickets in match | 0 | 0 |
| Best bowling | 4/60 | 5/44 |
| Catches/stumpings | 0/– | 11/– |
- Source: Cricinfo, 14 October 2022

Grahame Edward Corling (born 13 July 1941) is a former Australian cricketer who played in five Test matches in 1964. He took 12 wickets, including that of Geoffrey Boycott in his debut innings.

Grahame grew up in Waratah, New South Wales, and honed his cricketing skills playing for Waratah-Mayfield District Cricket Club.
