= Douglas Siggs =

Australian cricketer (1920–2008)

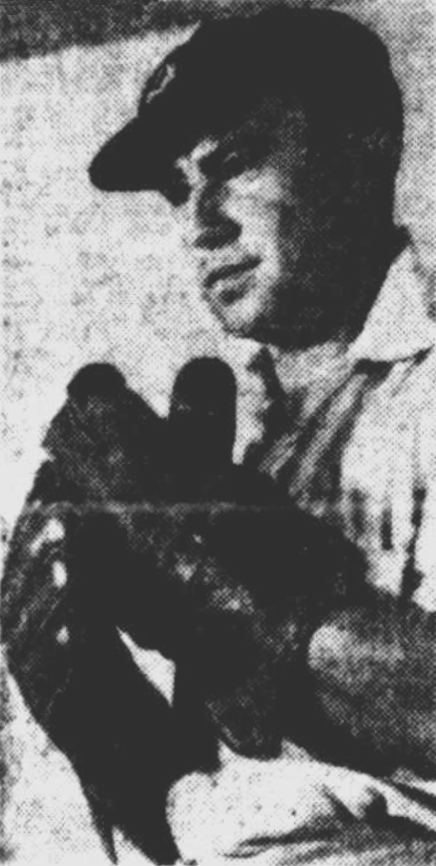

Personal information
- Born: 11 August 1920; Brisbane, Queensland, Australia
- Died: 2 July 2008 (aged 87); Brisbane, Queensland, Australia
- Source: Cricinfo, 6 October 2020

Douglas Siggs (11 August 1920 – 2 July 2008) was an Australian cricketer. He played in two first-class matches for Queensland in 1947/48.

Siggs was born into a sporting family with his brother, Keith, representing Queensland in school level hockey and his sister, Sybil, representing Queensland in women's baseball. In his youth he played basketball, hockey, and cricket being selected for the state schoolboys' teams in hockey and cricket from 1933 to 1935. He attended Valley School where he was first noticed as a talented cricketer and the Valley cricket club unsuccessfully attempted to recruit him for district cricket in the early 1930s.

Siggs played in fourth grade junior cricket in the 1937–38 season scoring 1000 runs in the season, and in September 1938 he was recruited by the Colts cricket team in Brisbane Grade Cricket as a wicket-keeper batsman. In Colts first match for the season Siggs was noted as one of their standout batsmen, and after the second match of the season Siggs received praise from the press for his adjustment from fourth grade cricket, the lowest level in Brisbane, to first grade.

In early 1941 Valley attempted to recruit Siggs again but he declined and instead began playing in the Brisbane warehouse cricket competition instead of first grade district cricket, and in February he scored 171 not out setting the record for highest individual score in warehouse cricket. It was suggested that Siggs had potential to represent the state and the Queensland Cricket Association was criticized for allowing Siggs to drop into a lower division. The Second World War interrupted Siggs cricket career as he served in the military but he returned to cricket playing for Warehouse in district cricket in 1944, and by March 1946 he had joined the Toombul cricket club as a wicket-keeper batsman.

In December 1947 Siggs was selected in the Queensland cricket team to tour the southern states. He made his debut in January 1948 against New South Wales in Sydney scoring ten not out and taking two catches in a draw, and he played his second and final first-class game against Western Australia in Brisbane in February taking two stumpings and a catch but failing to pass double figures with the bat. He received praise for "smart" keeping in his second game against Western Australia.

As of 1952 Siggs had retired from cricket to focus on playing hockey which he played at state and international level.

== See also ==
- List of Queensland first-class cricketers
