= Neil Hawke =

Australian sportsman (1939–2000)

- Hawke in 1958

Personal information
- Full name: Neil James Napier Hawke
- Born: 27 June 1939; Cheltenham, South Australia
- Died: 25 December 2000 (aged 61); Adelaide, South Australia
- Height: 1.85 m (6 ft 1 in)
- Batting: Right-handed
- Bowling: Right-arm medium-fast
- Role: All rounder

International information
- National side: Australia
- Test debut (cap 224): 15 February 1963 v England
- Last Test: 20 June 1968 v England

Domestic team information
- Years: Team
- 1959/60: Western Australia
- 1960/61–1967/68: South Australia
- 1968/69: Tasmania

Career statistics
Competition	Test	First-class	LA
Matches	27	145	1
Runs scored	365	3,383	–
Batting average	16.59	23.99	–
100s/50s	0/0	1/11	–
Top score	45*	141*	–
Balls bowled	6,974	29,193	36
Wickets	91	458	0
Bowling average	29.41	26.39	–
5 wickets in innings	6	23	–
10 wickets in match	1	5	–
Best bowling	7/105	8/61	–
Catches/stumpings	9/–	85/–	0/–
- Source: CricInfo, 7 January 2020

Neil James Napier Hawke (27 June 1939 – 25 December 2000) was an Australian Test cricketer and leading Australian rules footballer.

== Early years ==
Born in Cheltenham, South Australia, Hawke quickly developed as a natural all-round sportsman who excelled in cricket, football and golf.

== Cricket ==
Hawke made an impact on the cricket field as a medium-fast swing bowler with an unusual "crab-like" action, a capable lower-order batsman and a sound fieldsman. He made his first-class cricket debut for Western Australia in November 1959, scoring 89 and returning the figures of 0/49. However, Hawke failed to capitalize on this initial success and returned to South Australia at the end of the 1959/60 cricket season.

His cricket also developed enough for him to make his Test debut on 15 February 1963 in the drawn Fifth Ashes Test against England at the Sydney Cricket Ground, scoring 14 in the only innings he got to bat in and recording match figures of 2/89.

Hawke was a member of the 1963/64 Sheffield Shield winning South Australian team, and toured England (where he qualified for the British amateur golf championship and became Fred Trueman's 300th Test victim), India and Pakistan in 1964 and the West Indies in 1965. The West Indies tour found Hawke in top form as he took 24 wickets at 21.83 in the Test series, including match figures of 10–115 in the third Test at Bourda Cricket Ground, Georgetown, Guyana, as well as making his highest score, an unbeaten 45 at Sabina Park, Jamaica.

Back in Australia Hawke was the top wicket taker in the 1965–66 Ashes series, taking 16 wickets (26.18) with Garth McKenzie also taking 16, but at the higher average of 29.18. In the Third Test at Sydney England reached 308/2 before Hawke had Colin Cowdrey, M.J.K. Smith, Dave Brown and Jim Parks all caught behind by Wally Grout in succession, and his 7/105 was his best bowling in Tests, but Australia still lost by an innings. In the second innings of the Fourth Test at Adelaide Hawke took 5/54, reducing England to 32/3 and 266 all out as Australia won by an innings to draw the series.

Hawke's football career ended in 1966 when he dislocated his right shoulder. A screw was inserted in the point of the shoulder, which not only forced him to retire from football but also greatly affected his bowling. Nonetheless, he played home series against South Africa, Pakistan and India and toured South Africa in 1966–67 and England in 1968, where he played his final Test at Lord's. He finished his career after 27 Tests, 365 runs at 16.59, 91 wickets at 29.41 and a statement by his former Test captain, Richie Benaud, declaring Hawke as one of the finest medium-pace bowlers he had seen.

Hawke began playing in the Lancashire League, first for Nelson and then East Lancashire and moved to Launceston, Tasmania to become coach of the Northern Tasmanian Cricket Association. He continued to play in the Lancashire Leagues until 1974 before returning to Adelaide where he worked as a sports journalist and cricket commentator.

== Australian rules football ==
Neil Hawke

Personal information
- Height: 185 cm (6 ft 1 in)
- Weight: 91 kg (201 lb)
- Position: Forward

Playing career
Years	Club	Games (Goals)
1957	Port Adelaide	5 (27)
1958–1959	East Perth	42 (157)
1962–1963, 1966	West Torrens	33 (97)
Total		80 (281)

Career highlights
- Adelaide Oval single game goal record (15); 2x East Perth premiership player (1958, 1959)

Hawke made his senior Australian rules football debut for South Australian National Football League (SANFL) club Port Adelaide in August 1957. Hawke stamped himself as a future champion when in his third game he kicked 15 goals for Port against South Adelaide before being surprisingly dropped two weeks later.

Hawke quit Port at the end of 1957 to try his hand in Western Australia and made his West Australian National Football League (WANFL) debut in 1958 for East Perth Football Club, playing 42 matches and kicking 157 goals in two seasons with the Royals, including East Perth's 1958 and 1959 premierships. Hawke topped the WANFL's goalkicking list in 1959 with 114 goals, represented Western Australia against South Australia and gained local fame for apparently being the first footballer to perfect the drop punt over a long distance. Previously, the drop punt was only used over short distances on wet days but Hawke's innovation was said to have revolutionised the game in Western Australia.

Playing for West Torrens Football Club in the SANFL and South Australia in the Sheffield Shield, Hawke continued to star in both football and cricket. Hawke was part of the 1963 South Australian football team that defeated Victoria at the Melbourne Cricket Ground; the first time South Australia had won at the MCG since 1926, and in so doing became the first (and still the only) person to have represented both South Australia and Western Australia in Australian Rules football and cricket.

== Later years ==
In July 1980, Hawke ate some peanuts which precipitated a total blocking of his bowel, requiring surgery. During surgery, infection set in and spread rapidly through his body, leading to multiple organ failure. Over the next two years Hawke suffered twelve cardiac arrests, gangrene, had a further thirty operations and was drip fed over that period. His survival was considered a medical marvel by doctors and he was the subject of study by researchers on how long a patient could be drip fed. In 1990, Hawke suffered heart failure and then blood poisoning, central nervous system damage, cirrhosis of the liver and later contracted Hepatitis B and C before a brain dysfunction in 1996 severely impaired his speech and led to severe bouts of depression.

In his final years the former hellraiser Hawke became a born again Christian and joined the evangelical church.

He died in Adelaide on Christmas Day, 2000, aged 61, survived by his third wife Beverley and a daughter, Janet, from his first marriage. Tributes poured in from throughout the sporting world: on day two of the 2000 Boxing Day Test, the Australian players wore black armbands as a mark of respect; the South Australian Government created the Neil Hawke Scholarship for young sportspeople and obituaries claimed that he was the finest all-round sportsman South Australia had produced.

Preceded by Saeed Ahmed	Nelson Cricket Club; Professional; 1967	Succeeded by Sadiq Mohammad
Preceded by Sadiq Mohammad	Nelson Cricket Club; Professional; 1969–1970	Succeeded by Ghulam Abed
