= Alan Mackley =

Australian cricket umpire (1911–1982)

Alan E Mackley (1911 – 28 January 1982) was the first Australian cricket Test match umpire from Western Australia.

He umpired one Test match between Australia and England at Adelaide in January 1963. Mackley's partner in this match was Colin Egar.

He umpired 51 first-class matches between 1951 and 1965, all (except his Test match) in Perth.

Mackley was later a member of the Western Australian Cricket Association Appeals Board, and the Umpires' Appointment Board.

== See also ==
- List of Test cricket umpires
