= Peter Parfitt =

English cricketer

Personal information
- Full name: Peter Howard Parfitt
- Born: 8 December 1936 (age 89); Billingford, Norfolk, England
- Batting: Left-handed
- Bowling: Right-arm off break

International information
- National side: England
- Test debut: 30 December 1961 v India
- Last Test: 10 August 1972 v Australia

Career statistics
| Competition | Test | First-class |
|---|---|---|
| Matches | 37 | 498 |
| Runs scored | 1,882 | 26,924 |
| Batting average | 40.91 | 36.33 |
| 100s/50s | 7/6 | 58/144 |
| Top score | 131* | 200* |
| Balls bowled | 1,326 | 18,385 |
| Wickets | 12 | 277 |
| Bowling average | 47.83 | 30.32 |
| 5 wickets in innings | 0 | 5 |
| 10 wickets in match | 0 | 0 |
| Best bowling | 2/5 | 6/45 |
| Catches/stumpings | 42/– | 565/– |
- Source: ESPNcricinfo, 10 September 2022

Peter Howard Parfitt (born 8 December 1936) is an English former cricketer. He attended Fakenham Grammar School, and King Edward VII Grammar School, in Kings Lynn, Norfolk.

The cricket correspondent Colin Bateman noted, "he was a stocky, powerful left-handed batsman, happy to take on the quicks, and he made a dramatic impact in Test cricket despite his misgivings".

== Life and career ==
Parfitt was an all round sportsman, playing for Norwich City reserves at football, and cricket at Minor Counties level, before Middlesex offered him a playing contract.

Batting left-handed and bowling right-arm off-breaks, Parfitt played for Middlesex between 1956 and 1972, captaining the team from 1968 to 1970. He played in 37 Tests for England between 1962 and 1972, and was one of the Wisden Cricketers of the Year in 1963. He made four centuries in five consecutive Tests against Pakistan in 1962, but was used as a makeshift opener in the 1962–63 Ashes series in Australia and failed.

A left-handed batsman, right-arm off-break bowler and fine fielder, he was judged to be one of the most exciting strokemakers of his generation. Parfitt took over the captaincy at Middlesex when Fred Titmus stood down, but was not pleased to have only two seasons in charge, before Mike Brearley took over the role. He scored almost 27,000 runs in first-class cricket.

Parfitt retired from the sport at the age of 35, a decision he later regretted.

After cricket he ran a pub on the Lancashire/Yorkshire border, and later became involved in hospitality at Test matches. After selling that business, Parfitt became an after-dinner speaker.

Sporting positions
| Preceded by Fred Titmus | Middlesex County Cricket Captain; 1968–1970 | Succeeded by Mike Brearley |
