= Ted Dexter =

English cricketer (1935–2021)

Ted Dexter CBE
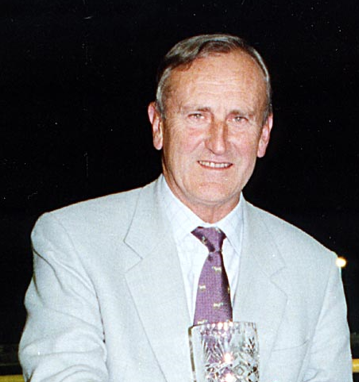
- Dexter in 2006

Personal information
- Full name: Edward Ralph Dexter
- Born: 15 May 1935; Milan, Italy
- Died: 25 August 2021 (aged 86); Wolverhampton, England
- Batting: Right-handed
- Bowling: Right-arm medium
- Role: Batsman
- Relatives: Tom Longfield (father-in-law)

International information
- National side: England
- Test debut (cap 388): 24 July 1958 v New Zealand
- Last Test: 22 August 1968 v Australia

Domestic team information
- Years: Team
- 1956–1958: Cambridge University
- 1957–1968: Sussex
- 1957–1965: MCC

Career statistics
Competition	Test	FC	LA
Matches	62	327	43
Runs scored	4,502	21,150	1,209
Batting average	47.89	40.75	33.58
100s/50s	9/27	51/108	1/8
Top score	205	205	115
Balls bowled	5,317	26,255	575
Wickets	66	419	21
Bowling average	34.93	29.92	19.85
5 wickets in innings	0	9	0
10 wickets in match	0	2	0
Best bowling	4/10	7/24	3/6
Catches/stumpings	29/–	231/–	16/–
- Source: CricketArchive, 17 September 2009

Edward Ralph Dexter, CBE (15 May 1935 – 25 August 2021) was an England international cricketer.

An aggressive middle-order batsman of ferocious power and a right-arm medium bowler, he captained Sussex and England in the early 1960s. He captained England in 30 test matches out of his 62 test match appearances.

He was known by the nickname Lord Ted. He is credited for his instrumental role in the formation of the modern ICC Player Rankings system. In June 2021, he was inducted into the ICC Cricket Hall of Fame as one of the special inductees to mark the inaugural ICC World Test Championship final.

== Biography ==
Dexter was born in Milan in Italy, where his father Ralph Dexter ran a successful underwriting agency. He along with his family moved to England when he was aged three just before the start of World War II.

== Early career 1953–60 ==
Dexter was educated at Norfolk House, Beaconsfield, and Radley College, where he played in the first XI from 1950 to 1953, initially as a wicket-keeper and as captain in 1953, and was nicknamed "Lord Ted" by his coach Ivor Gilliat for his aloof self-confidence. His cricket coach at Radley was B H Smithson, father of England cricketer Gerald Smithson. While Dexter was head boy at Radley, Peter Cook, English comedian, satirist, writer and actor, was among those younger boys upon whom 'a big & strong' Dexter inflicted corporal punishment. He did his national service as a second lieutenant in the 11th Hussars during the Malayan Emergency in 1953–55 and was awarded the Malaya Campaign Medal. Dexter then entered Jesus College, Cambridge in October 1955, where he played golf and rugby in addition to winning his cricket Blue and playing in the University Match in 1956, 1957 and (as captain) 1958.

He first came to notice as a bowler taking 5/8 and 3/47 for the Gentlemen in 1957 and joined Sussex County Cricket Club in the same year. He made his Test debut in 1958 against New Zealand, made 52 and E. W. Swanton thought that he should have been picked for Peter May's MCC tour of Australia in 1958–59. In the end he was flown from Paris (where his wife was working as a model) to reinforce May's injury-struck team. Dexter arrived in the middle of the tour, did not have time to acclimatize and although he did well in the tour matches he failed in the Tests. Continuing on the tour to New Zealand he made 141, his maiden Test century. After an indifferent summer against India the decision to take him to the Caribbean in 1959–60 was much criticised, but "Lord Ted" made his name thrashing the fast bowlers Wes Hall and Charlie Griffith with his powerful drives. He hit 132 not out in the First Test, 110 in the Fourth Test, made 526 runs (65.75), topping the England batting averages, and was a Wisden Cricketer of the Year in 1961.

== Rising star 1960–61 ==
On his return Dexter was made captain of Sussex, which he held until he retired in 1965. He had a quiet home Test season against South Africa, but in the First Test at Edgbaston in the 1961 Ashes series England started their second innings needing 321 runs to avoid an innings defeat. Dexter made 180, the biggest century for England against Australia since the war and studded with 31 cracking boundaries, but typically he was stumped in the last minutes of the match trying to hit Bobby Simpson for six so he could make a double century. In the famous Fourth Test at Old Trafford he played a spectacular innings of 76 in 84 minutes to take England to 106 runs from victory with 9 wickets in hand and the Ashes in sight, but his dismissal set off an England collapse and the series was lost.

== England captain 1961–62 ==
With Peter May and Colin Cowdrey declining to tour India and Pakistan in 1961–62 Dexter was chosen to lead the MCC team. With a weakened team (Fred Trueman and Brian Statham also refused to tour) Dexter beat Pakistan 1–0 but lost to India 2–0, their first series victory over England. He made 712 Test runs (71.20) on the tour, including his highest Test score of 205 at Karachi, and another 446 runs (89.20) when Pakistan toured England in 1962 and were beaten 4–0. Peter May finally declared his retirement in 1962 and the selectors had to choose who would captain the English cricket team in Australia in 1962–63. Dexter captained England in the First and Second Tests against Pakistan, winning two big victories, but Colin Cowdrey was put in charge for the Third Test. Cowdrey had been May's affable vice-captain, had a shrewd cricket brain and was seen as his natural successor, but had inherited his cautious tactics and the Marylebone Cricket Club was crusading for "brighter cricket". Cowdrey withdrew from the final Gentleman v Players match at Lord's because of kidney stones even though he had been appointed captain, which usually indicated the selectors' intentions. Dexter was put back in charge (and drew against Fred Trueman's Players), but found another rival in the old Sussex captain the Reverend David Sheppard, who was willing to take a sabbatical from his church mission in the East End in order to tour Australia. Sheppard made 112 for the Gentlemen and was chosen for the tour, but Dexter was confirmed as captain for the remainder of the home series and the forthcoming tour of Australia and New Zealand with Cowdrey as vice-captain. The general opinion was that England had a good batting side, but their bowling was unvaried, would struggle to dismiss Australia and that the tourists would be lucky to avoid another defeat.

== Tour of Australia and New Zealand 1962–63 ==
He made 481 runs (48.10), the most runs by an England captain in Australia, and this remains a record. The team manager was Bernard Fitzalan-Howard, 16th Duke of Norfolk, KG, GCVO, PC, Earl Marshal and Chief Butler of England, and it was joked that "Lord Ted" could only be controlled by a duke. In fact, the Duke was the President of Sussex County Cricket Club, had been instrumental in Dexter's appointment as county captain, shared his interests in horse racing and golf and was very popular with the Australian public. In the tour match between the Marylebone Cricket Club (MCC) and an Australian XI Dexter hit 102 in 110 minutes, including 2 sixes and 13 fours. John Woodcock of The Times wrote "I doubt if it is possible to hit a cricket ball any harder than Dexter did today. Melbourne is a huge ground and no one who hits a six here is likely to forget it. Against Veivers, an off-spinner, Dexter twice cleared the sight screen, once by a good 20 yards." At the Adelaide Oval Dexter included "a six from a gigantic hit onto the roof of the stand – one of the biggest hits ever seen at the ground." He was the main draw in the England team and over a million spectators came to see the tourists, the most since 1936–37. The tour returned a record profit for the Marylebone Cricket Club (MCC) of £24,000, beating the £17,000 of 1946–47.

Dexter continued his good run of form to equal Patsy Hendren's England record of six consecutive Test 50s (85 and 172 against Pakistan and 70, 99, 93 and 52 against Australia), which he soon shared with Ken Barrington and more recently Alastair Cook. His powerful innings enlivened the First and Second Tests and gave England a 1–0 lead in the series. Australia came back to win the Third Test at Sydney, where Dexter had preferred to keep his fast bowling attack from the Second Test even when Fred Trueman volunteered to stand down in favour of a second spinner to Fred Titmus. In the end the unsupported Titmus took 7/79 in the first innings and Australia won by 8 wickets, E. W. Swanton and others thought that if either David Allen or Ray Illingworth had been in the team England would have won the Ashes. Even so, the match might have been saved if Dexter had not conceded 27 runs off 26 balls so that the teams would not have to return the next day to finish the game. The last few overs were played in the rain and it rained for most of the fifth day, so England might have won the Ashes. Dexter's negative field placings and lack of urgency failed to regain the Ashes and the painful draws in the Fourth and Fifth Tests particularly spoilt the atmosphere, as Richie Benaud was determined to hold onto the Ashes and Dexter was content to draw a series in Australia. In mitigation the Adelaide pitch was flat as a pancake. The Sydney ground was so saturated in the days before the match that mowing was impossible before the start. The "square" was like one large bunker and the outfield like a meadow. Barely a ball reached the boundary. Benaud was an advocate of "go ahead" captaincy and Dexter for "brighting up" cricket and their reputations were unfairly tarnished.

== Home series 1963–64 ==
As captain against Frank Worrell's West Indian cricket team in England in 1963 Dexter was able to loosen up after the Ashes and they played an exciting Test series. After losing the First Test, in the Second Test at Lord's England's first innings rested heavily on Dexter's hard-hitting 70 off 75 balls when he took on the West Indian fast bowlers Charlie Griffith and Wes Hall in an innings that was remembered by all who saw it. In the second innings Colin Cowdrey came out to bat with a broken arm with victory, defeat or a tie still possible in the last two balls, but David Allen blocked them for a draw. England levelled the series in the Third Test thanks to Dexter (4/38 and 1/7) and Fred Trueman (5/75 and 7/44), but lost the last two Tests and the series.

In 1964 Dexter was again in charge in the rain-soaked 1964 Ashes series. In the decisive Third Test at Headingley he removed the off-spinner Fred Titmus after he had taken three wickets to reduce Australia to 187/7, still 81 runs behind England. Dexter took the new ball and gave it to Fred Trueman who bowled a series of bouncers which Peter Burge hooked and pulled to 160, hoisting Australia to 389 and a 7 wicket win. Although the change made sense as the new batsman Neil Hawke was fragile against fast bowling and Trueman, the greatest wicket-taker in the world at the time, was playing on his home ground, Dexter was heavily criticised for a decision which lost the series. In the Fourth Test Australia made 656/8, but thanks to a stand of 246 between Ken Barrington (256) and Dexter (174) England reached 611 and avoided defeat. It was the first time that two teams had made 600 runs in an innings in a Test, and their fortunes gripped the cricketing nation, but the inevitable draw meant that Australia retained the Ashes. As some consolation Dexter led Sussex to the finals of the Gillette Cup in 1963 and 1964, and won both, the first trophies in the county's history.

== Later career 1965–72 ==
Dexter declared himself unavailable for the 1964–65 tour of South Africa as he contested Jim Callaghan's Cardiff South East seat for the Conservative Party in the 1964 General Election. Finding himself free to tour after his defeat he was made vice-captain to M. J. K. Smith, who won the series and continued as captain. His cricket career was virtually ended by an accident in 1965. His Jaguar car ran out of petrol in west London, and he was pushing it to safety when it pinned him to a warehouse door, breaking his leg. He left Sussex and played occasional Sunday games with the International Cavaliers, and made 104 when they defeated the 1966 West Indians by 7 wickets. He returned briefly in 1968, making 203 not out in his comeback match against Kent, but failing in the 1968 Ashes series. He played Sunday League games for Sussex in 1971 and 1972.

== Administration 1989–2003 ==
Dexter retired from cricket to concentrate on other interests in 1968, remaining a journalist, becoming a broadcaster and founding a PR company. In the late 1980s he joined Bob Willis to find new fast bowlers for English cricket. Sponsored by a brewery, application forms were sent to pubs to encourage young men, but most were filled in by jokers and drunks and only a few potential candidates were discovered. These were trained with javelin throwing and other exercises to strengthen their back and arm muscles, but the only bowler in the scheme who played first-class cricket had been signed up by Warwickshire before its inception. The plan therefore failed even though it generated much publicity and showed a certain amount of imagination and initiative.

In 1987, Dexter had the idea of developing a ranking system for Test cricketers. He developed the system with statisticians Gordon Vince and Rob Eastaway, and it was launched as the Deloittes Ratings. The Ratings steadily gained credibility, and were formally adopted by the International Cricket Council in 2003, and have become the official ICC Player Rankings. In an article in The Cricketer magazine in 2005, Dexter was quoted as saying: "The rankings idea was my biggest contribution to cricket. Much better than being known for hitting a couple of extra-cover drives." Former cricketer and analyst Simon Hughes in his bibliography titled And God Created Cricket noted that Dexter's ideas had shaped modern cricket.

In 1989 he succeeded Peter May as Chairman of the England Cricket Selectors, receiving a modest £18,000 pay to compensate for his lost newspaper contract, the first chairman to be paid. "Dexter was soon in action, initially by way of press conferences and then, as the season developed, by lightning visits to the county grounds. These he made, despite an operation to a heel that put him for a while on crutches, by motorbike and car, a demonstration of enthusiasm and interest that was impressive." After the chaos of 1988 – the so-called Summer of Four Captains – he wanted the tough Mike Gatting as captain, but was vetoed by Ossie Wheatley and his status was immediately undermined. Instead the more relaxed David Gower was appointed for the six-Test series. Dexter tackled the role with energy and enthusiasm, but the shine soon wore off as Allan Border's 1989 Australians beat England 4–0 to regain the Ashes, their first series victory in England since 1975. His cause was not helped by the announcement of the Mike Gatting's rebel tour of South Africa in the middle of the series, which removed more than fifteen England players from contention. Admittedly England were already 2–0 down in the series and none of these players had performed well so far in the summer, but it was an indication of the division and demoralisation of English cricket. In the First Test at Headingley Dexter selected four fast bowlers and no spinners for the team, advised Gower to put Australia in to bat, only to see them make 601/7 and win by 210 runs. For the Second Test he wrote an inspirational hymn for the England cricketers to sing called "Onward Gower's Soldiers" (to the tune of "Onward, Christian Soldiers") and appointed a team chaplain, but remained aloof from the players and seldom visited the dressing room. At the end of the summer he told the press that he couldn't think of any mistakes he had made and later joked that the "lines of Venus were in the wrong juxtaposition", which was incorrectly interpreted by the press as a genuine belief in New Age mysticism. The lackadaisical Gower was fired at the end of the summer and the more painstaking Graham Gooch was made captain until 1993, despite Dexter having called his previous appointment as captain as "being hit in the face by a dead fish".

Dexter's tenure as Chairman of Selectors coincided with a poor period in English cricket, but there were some successes; these included the first Test victory over the West Indies for 16 years in 1990, victories over New Zealand and India in the run-laden summer of 1990, and the 2–2 draw with the West Indies in 1991. Against this England suffered two further series defeats to Australia (3–0 in 1990–91 and 4–1 in 1993), and were heavily defeated 3–0 in India in 1992–93, after Gower was controversially dropped from the team. Dexter resigned under a cloud at the end of 1993, but his overhaul of the antiquated structure of English cricket and forward-looking reforms such as the change from three- to four-day county cricket had a significant impact. Richie Benaud commented that the structures he put in place "will be of great of benefit to English cricket in years to come. Equally, I'm in no doubt that others will take the credit for it." He also became president of the Marylebone Cricket Club (MCC), and was chairman of the MCC's cricket committee until 2003, when he was replaced by Tony Lewis. He was also Chairman of the MCC's "England Committee", which was an administrative role and was awarded the CBE in the 2001 New Year Honours.

== Style ==
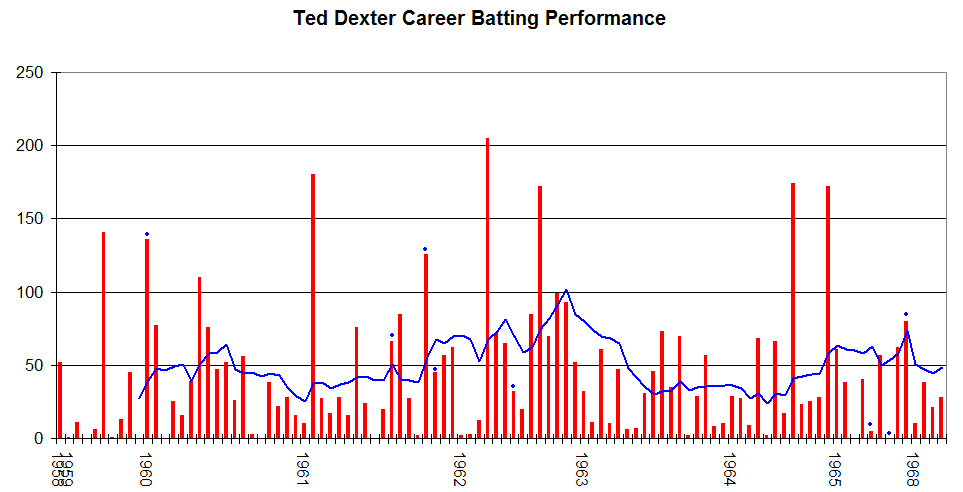
Ted Dexter's career performance graph.

Dexter was a cavalier batsman in the old amateur style and a ferocious strokemaker, but was known as being moody and mercurial. As a batsman he could leave the hands of the fielders team bruised and reddened with his powerful drives and cuts. His fault was that he seldom gave a bowling attack due respect and got himself out with rash strokes. Though more a batsman than a bowler he could seam and swing the ball, was a useful third paceman even at Test level and was a versatile fielder. Dexter was a one-day player, where his hitting, bowling, fielding and captaincy gave Sussex their first two trophies – the inaugural Gillette Cup in 1963 and again in 1964. He devised field placings for limited overs games and his 'ideas changed the game forever. It is no exaggeration to say that Dexter was the man who shaped modern cricket'. In first-class matches his skills were outweighed by his mistakes. As captain he had "more theories than Charles Darwin", sometimes shifting fielders on a whim and was hailed as a "genius" if a wicket fell as a result. He was dictatorial on the field, rarely consulting with his bowlers about field placings and pulling them off by saying "You've had enough now. Get down to third man"

== Outside cricket ==
Dexter married Susan Longfield on 2 May 1959. She was the daughter of a former Kent cricketer Tom Longfield, whom he met at a party at Cambridge University while still an undergraduate and decided to marry on sight. She worked as a model and she joined her husband on the tour of Australia in 1962–63, where she generated considerable press interest and earned more than any of the cricketers. Fred Trueman recalled; "Ted Dexter's wife arrived in Australia. Ted's wife was a looker and a model. She is a very lovely lady, but on hearing of her arrival, when Ted faced the press, the majority of questions posed were about his wife...during an England cricket team press conference!". They had a son Thomas and a daughter Genevieve.

Dexter was a talented golfer, an amateur champion, and some believe could have achieved success in that sport if he had not chosen cricket. In Australia in 1962–1963 he played a foursome with Norman Von Nida, Jack Nicklaus and Gary Player (with Colin Cowdrey as his caddy) and they offered to take him to America to become a tournament golfer, but Dexter declined. He went on to win the President's Putter three times in his career.

Dexter owned Jaguar cars, Norton motorbikes, greyhounds, race horses and in 1970 piloted his Aztec BPA-23 Pommies Progress to Australia with his family to cover the Ashes as a journalist, covering 12,000 miles and making 24 stops.

Dexter launched his own PR company, which ran for many years and briefly became a television cricket commentator, alongside Richie Benaud and Denis Compton. He wrote a weekly column on cricket for The Observer, and then, more lucratively, for the Sunday Mirror.

He was noted for his enthusiasm for horse racing, which reportedly exceeded that of Gary Sobers and Brian Close. He carried a portable television to watch races in cricket dressing rooms and once declared a Sussex innings from Brighton Racecourse.

He co-wrote, with Clifford Makins, the crime novel Testkill (1976) where an Australian bowler is murdered during play at a Test match against England at Lord's.

In December 2012, on BBC One's Antiques Roadshow, Dexter appeared with Paul Atterbury, a life-long fan. Dexter talked about his father's Military Cross, which had subsequently been stolen.

== Death ==
Dexter died on 25 August 2021 at the age of 86 in Wolverhampton due to an age-related illness. He left a widow Susan, a son, daughter and several grandchildren. In a statement following his death, Marylebone Cricket Club described him as "one of England's greatest ever cricketers". England players wore black armbands as a tribute during the second day of the third test match of the series between India and England at Headingley.

== See also ==
- List of Test cricketers born in non-Test playing nations

== Cited sources ==
- Eager, Patrick and Ross, Alan (1989) Tour of Tours, Border's Victorious Australians of 1989, Hodder and Stoughton.
- Moyes, Johnnie and Goodman, Tom (1965) With the M.C.C. in Australia 1962–63, A Critical Story of the Tour, The Sportsmans Book Club.
- Snow, John (1976) Cricket rebel, an Autobiography. The Hamlyn Publishing Group Ltd. p. 25. ISBN 0600319326.
- Titmus, Fred (2005) My Life in Cricket, John Blake Publishing Ltd.
- Trueman, Fred (2004) As It Was, The Memoirs of Fred Trueman, Pan Books.

Sporting positions
Preceded by Peter May	English national cricket captain 1961/2-1963	Succeeded by M. J. K. Smith
Preceded by M. J. K. Smith	English national cricket captain 1964	Succeeded by M. J. K. Smith
Preceded by Robin Marlar	Sussex county cricket captain 1960–1965	Succeeded by The 9th Nawab of Pataudi
