= English cricket team in Australia in 1958–59 =

International cricket tour

The England cricket team toured Australia in the 1958–59 season to play a five-match Test series against Australia for the Ashes. The tour was organised by the Marylebone Cricket Club and matches outside the Tests were played under the MCC name.

Australia won the series 4–0, with one match drawn, and therefore recovered the Ashes which they had lost in 1953.

== Test series summary ==
- 1st Test at Brisbane Cricket Ground – Australia won by 8 wickets
- 2nd Test at Melbourne Cricket Ground – Australia won by 8 wickets
- 3rd Test at Sydney Cricket Ground – match drawn
- 4th Test at Adelaide Oval – Australia won by 10 wickets
- 5th Test at Melbourne Cricket Ground – Australia won by 9 wickets

== Ceylon ==
The English team had a stopover in Colombo en route to Australia and played a one-day single-innings match there against the Ceylon national team, which at that time did not have Test status.

== Bibliography ==
- Harte, Chris (1993). A History of Australian Cricket. London: André Deutsch. ISBN 978-02-33988-25-2.
- Preston, Norman, ed. (1960). Wisden Cricketers' Almanack (97th ed.). London: Sporting Handbooks Ltd. OCLC 786248129.
- Robinson, Ray (1975). On Top Down Under. Australia: Cassell. ISBN 978-07-26973-64-2.
- Ross, Gordon, ed. (1959). Playfair Cricket Annual (12th ed.). London: Playfair Books Ltd. OCLC 906559129.
