= M. J. K. Smith =

English cricketer (1933–2026)

Personal information
- Full name: Michael John Knight Smith
- Born: 30 June 1933; Leicester, England
- Died: 17 May 2026 (aged 92)
- Batting: Right-handed
- Bowling: Right arm slow medium

International information
- National side: England
- Test debut (cap 386): 5 June 1958 v New Zealand
- Last Test: 18 July 1972 v Australia

Domestic team information
- Years: Team
- 1951–1955: Leicestershire
- 1954–1956: Oxford University
- 1956–1975: Warwickshire

Career statistics
Competition	Test	FC	LA
Matches	50	637	140
Runs scored	2,278	39,832	3,106
Batting average	31.63	41.84	27.48
100s/50s	3/11	69/242	0/15
Top score	121	204	97*
Balls bowled	214	487	2
Wickets	1	5	–
Bowling average	128.00	61.00	–
5 wickets in innings	–	–	–
10 wickets in match	–	–	n/a
Best bowling	1/10	1/0	0/8
Catches/stumpings	53/–	595/–	40/–
- Source: CricketArchive, 22 March 2026

Michael John Knight Smith (30 June 1933 – 17 May 2026), known as M. J. K. Smith or Mike Smith, was an English cricketer and rugby union player. He played for Leicestershire from 1951 until 1955, and for Warwickshire between 1956 and 1975. Smith played in fifty Tests for England between 1958 and 1972 and was captain of England twenty-five times. He also represented England at rugby union in one match against Wales in 1956. He remains England's most recent male double international in cricket and rugby.

== Biography ==
Michael John Knight Smith was born on 30 June 1933 in Leicester, and raised nearby in Broughton Astley. He was educated at Stamford School and St Edmund Hall, Oxford, where he read geography.

A bespectacled right-handed batsman, he came to prominence playing for Oxford University, scoring centuries in three consecutive Varsity matches against Cambridge, from 1954 to 1956. Smith was president of Vincent's Club in 1956. Appointed captain of Warwickshire in 1957, he was one of the heaviest scorers in first-class cricket for the next 10 years, with 3,249 runs in 1959 as his highest aggregate. He remained as Warwickshire captain until 1967 when he retired, but he reappeared in 1970 and stayed until 1975.

Smith captained England in 25 of his 50 Test match appearances, yet in a period rich in batting talent he was rarely guaranteed a place. Uncertainty against fast bowling, particularly early in an innings, was exposed by a series of low scores in the mid-1960s, and Smith faced considerable press criticism, unusual for the time.

He also represented England at rugby union against Wales in January 1956. He remains England's last male double international to date in major sports by reference to his final appearance in 1972. Arthur Milton, a double international in football and cricket, is later in terms of his first appearance in a second sport, making his Test debut six weeks after Smith.

In later years he was chairman of Warwickshire County Cricket Club (1991–2003) and an ICC match referee (1991–1996). His son Neil Smith followed in his footsteps by captaining Warwickshire and playing, albeit only in One Day Internationals, for England.

Smith died on 17 May 2026, aged 92.

== See also ==
- List of cricket and rugby union players

== Bibliography ==
- Bateman, Colin (1993). If The Cap Fits. Tony Williams Publications. ISBN 978-18-69833-21-3.

Sporting positions
Preceded by Ted Dexter; Ted Dexter	English national cricket captain 1963–1964; 1964–1966	Succeeded by Ted Dexter; Colin Cowdrey
