= Fred Titmus =

English cricketer (1932–2011)

- Fred Titmus in 1962

Personal information
- Full name: Frederick John Titmus
- Born: 24 November 1932; Somers Town, London, England
- Died: 23 March 2011 (aged 78); England
- Batting: Right-handed
- Bowling: Right-arm off-break

International information
- National side: England
- Test debut: 23 June 1955 v South Africa
- Last Test: 30 January 1975 v Australia
- ODI debut: 8 March 1975 v New Zealand
- Last ODI: 9 March 1975 v New Zealand

Career statistics
Competition	Test	ODI	FC	LA
Matches	53	2	792	149
Runs scored	1,449	11	21,588	1,038
Batting average	22.29	11.00	23.11	13.48
100s/50s	0/10	0/0	6/105	0/0
Top score	84*	11	137*	41
Balls bowled	15,118	56	173,450	7,126
Wickets	153	3	2,830	159
Bowling average	32.22	17.66	22.37	25.66
5 wickets in innings	7	0	168	3
10 wickets in match	0	0	26	0
Best bowling	7/79	3/53	9/52	5/25
Catches/stumpings	35/–	1/–	472/–	34/–
- Source: Cricinfo, 19 August 2013

Frederick John Titmus MBE (24 November 1932 – 23 March 2011) was an English cricketer, whose first-class career, mostly for Middlesex with a short stint for Surrey, spanned five decades. He was the fourth man after W.G. Grace, Wilfred Rhodes and George Hirst to take 2,500 wickets and make 20,000 runs in first-class cricket. Although he was best known for his off-spin (though at first he bowled medium pace as well), he was an accomplished lower-order batsman who deserved to be called an all-rounder, even opening the batting for England on six occasions. Outside cricket, Titmus was also a footballer; at one stage he was contracted to Watford as a professional, having earlier played for amateur club Leytonstone, and then for Chelsea as a junior.

== Early years ==
Educated at William Ellis School, Highgate, London, Titmus was in his school's first XI by the age of 13, and when 16 he wrote to Lord's, the ground being close to his home, to ask for a trial. He was accepted onto the ground-staff after bowling only a few balls, and in June 1949 he made his first-class cricket debut for Middlesex against Somerset at Bath, at the age of 16 years and 213 days, Middlesex's youngest cricketer ever at that point.

1950 was Titmus's first full season of county cricket, and he performed reasonably well, taking 55 wickets including 7–34 against Minor Counties in July. His appearances in 1951 and 1952 were restricted because of his National Service obligations, although he played for the Combined Services. In 1953 he returned to play for Middlesex full-time, and took 105 wickets, the first of 16 years in which he would reach three figures.

1955 was a good year for Titmus, as he did the double for the first time: he took what would remain his best season's haul of 191 wickets at an average of just 16.31, taking five or more wickets in an innings on no less than 18 occasions. 158 of these wickets were for his county, beating by four the record set up in 1900 by Albert Trott. He also passed a thousand runs for the first time, scoring 1,235 including the first of his six centuries, making 104 against Hampshire albeit in a losing cause as Middlesex lost by an innings.

== England: picked and dropped ==
A fine display for MCC against the South Africans in May 1955, where he took 8–43 in the second innings, brought Titmus his England debut for the second Test at Lord's, but he took only one wicket (that of Hugh Tayfield) and failed twice with the bat; and had a worse time in the third Test at Old Trafford, making 0 and 19 and taking 0–51. He was dropped, but he went on a non-Test tour to Pakistan with MCC that winter.

From 1956 to 1962 inclusive, Titmus achieved the double in every year except 1958, but a place in the Test team still eluded him. 1961 was his best year with the bat, as he scored 1,703 runs at a fine average of 37.02, including 14 half-centuries; he passed 50 more than a hundred times in the course of his first-class career.

== Recalled to the Test team ==
His form in 1962, 136 wickets and 1,238 runs, led to Titmus being recalled to Test cricket, and he played in the third and fourth Tests against Pakistan. For his performances that year (including a career-best nine for 52 against Cambridge University) he was made one of the Wisden Cricketers of the Year in the 1963 edition of the Almanack. Titmus went to Australia for the 1962–63 Ashes series and made his highest first-class century of 137 not out vs South Australia. He played in all five Tests, and took more wickets than any other English bowler; 21 at 29.33, including a Test career best 7 for 79 in the Third Test and 5 for 103 in the Fifth, both at Sydney, and making 59 not out in the Fourth Test at Adelaide.

For five years Titmus was consistently selected for England, and he produced some outstanding displays, not least in India in 1963–64, when in the course of a five-Test series (packed into just six weeks) he picked up 27 wickets to help relieve the monotony as every game finished in a draw. In 1964 he opened the batting against Australia with Geoff Boycott at Trent Bridge after John Edrich was injured. Meanwhile, he continued to be invaluable for Middlesex, achieving up to 100 wickets in most years and contributing when batting, as well as captaining the county side between 1965 and 1968. He toured Australia again for the 1965–66 Ashes series; making 258 runs (64.50), but taking only nine wickets (at 57.44), although in the Third Test at Sydney he took 4-40 as England spun their way to their biggest victory in Australia since 1912.

== Boating accident ==
Titmus was appointed vice-captain for the Tour of the West Indies in 1967/68, but his run came to an end in Barbados on that same tour. Titmus was involved in an accident shortly before the Third when, whilst swimming, he caught his foot in the propeller of a boat that was being driven by the wife of one of the senior members of the English cricket team. He lost four toes, and for a time there was a doubt whether he would play again. Fortunately the Canadian ice hockey team were on holiday there and their team doctor attended to Titmus's injury. He received a paltry £90 compensation from the MCC's insurance policy; which, at least, had the effect of ensuring a complete overhaul of insurance cover for England cricketers playing overseas. By May 1968 he was once again bowling as normal for Middlesex, and doubts about his fitness were dispelled as he claimed 111 victims that season and topped Middlesex's batting averages, though averaging under 26 an innings.

Titmus's batting gradually became less effective, and from 1969 onwards he passed 50 only six more times, though he did make an unbeaten 112 against Warwickshire as late as 1976. Until 1976 he took at least 57 first-class wickets in every year.

== Later career ==
1974/75 saw Titmus make an unexpected return to the England team, as he played in four of the six Ashes Tests. Although he took only seven wickets, he scored 61 at Perth. During the season Titmus played his only two One Day Internationals, both against New Zealand. Both games were ruined by rain, but in the second at Wellington he took 3–53 from his seven eight-ball overs, his only ODI wickets.

Having coached in South Africa on several occasions earlier in his career, in the 1975/76 season Titmus played for Orange Free State in that country's Currie Cup competition, and took 42 wickets at 16.30. His career was beginning to wind down, and 1976 was his final full year in England. After the end of that season he went to coach at Surrey, playing for that county against Kent in 1978, but it was an unhappy time. According to then Surrey player Lonsdale Skinner, Titmus allegedly racially abused him during a Second XI match. He re-appeared sporadically for Middlesex in 1979, 1980 and 1982. His last appearance came by accident: attending the Middlesex v Surrey match in 1982 as a spectator (aged 49), he was prevailed upon to play by Middlesex captain Mike Brearley, and the gamble paid off: Titmus took 3–43 on a pitch taking spin, and Middlesex won by 58 runs. He thus became one of the very few men to have played first-class cricket in five decades (1940s – 1980s) (W. G. Grace was another).

He created a Middlesex appearance record of 642, and took 2,361 wickets, another county record, in addition to racking up in excess of 20,000 runs.

== Press, publications and media ==
Titmus published his first autobiography Talk of the Double in 1964. In it he revealed that he was born in Somers Town and that his family moved to Kentish Town in 1939. In his second autobiography, My Life in Cricket published in 2005, he was rather more forthright in his views of former playing colleagues, and depicted five decades of his playing career with passion.

He also served as an England test selector from 1994 to 1996.

He was the subject of the 1985 song Fuckin' 'Ell It's Fred Titmus on the album Back in the DHSS by the British band Half Man Half Biscuit.

== Final years ==
Fred Titmus died on 23 March 2011, aged 78, after a long illness. He was married twice, firstly to Jean, and he was survived by his second wife, Stephanie. He had three children and two grandchildren.

Sporting positions
Preceded by Colin Drybrough	Middlesex County Cricket Captain; 1965–1967	Succeeded by Peter Parfitt
