= Indian cricket team in Australia in 1967–68 =

International cricket tour

- Date: 23 December 1967 – 31 January 1968
- Location: Australia
- Result: Australia won the 4-Test series 4–0
Teams
- Australia: India
Captains
- (Australia) Bob Simpson (Australia) Bill Lawry: (India) Mansoor Ali Khan Pataudi (India) Chandu Borde
Most runs
- Bob Cowper (485): Rusi Surti (367)
Most wickets
- Bob Simpson (15): E. A. S. Prasanna (25)

The India national cricket team toured Australia in the 1967–68 season and played a four-match Test series against Australia. Australia won the Test series 4–0.

India could not win any first-class matches on the tour either, losing to Western Australia and South Australia, and drawing with Victoria, Tasmania and New South Wales. The first-class match against Queensland was abandoned without a ball being bowled.

The Indians went on after this tour to play four Test matches and two other games in New Zealand – see Indian cricket team in New Zealand in 1967-68.

== Indian team ==
- Nawab of Pataudi (captain)
- Chandu Borde (vice-captain)
- Syed Abid Ali
- Bishan Bedi
- Bhagwat Chandrasekhar
- Ramakant Desai
- Farokh Engineer
- Indrajitsinhji
- M. L. Jaisimha
- Umesh Kulkarni
- Bapu Nadkarni
- Erapalli Prasanna
- Dilip Sardesai
- Ramesh Saxena
- Venkataraman Subramanya
- Rusi Surti
- Ajit Wadekar

The manager was Ghulam Ahmed.

India's squad of 16 members for the tour of Australia and New Zealand was announced on 8 November 1967. Five changes were made from the side that toured England earlier that year — Subrata Guha, Sadanand Mohol, Budhi Kunderan, Hanumant Singh and S. Venkataraghavan were replaced by Ramakant Desai, Umesh Kulkarni, Indrajitsinhji, Bapu Nadkarni and Syed Abid Ali.

All the players had played Tests before except for Abid Ali and Kulkarni, who made their debuts in the Tests against Australia. Jaisimha was not in the original team, but was added to the side after the Second Test.

== Tour games ==
=== One-day: Western Australia Country v Indians ===
22 November 1967
Scorecard

Indians; 259/4d (41.7 overs)	v	Western Australia Country; 186/5 (39 overs)
Ajit Wadekar 96; John McCormack 1/16 (2 overs)		Merv Hosking 52; V. Subramanya 3/60 (10 overs)

Match drawn
Harvey, Perth
Umpires: J. H. Blyth and W. I. Carter

- Western Australia Country won the toss and elected to field.

The Western Australia Country side was captained by Merv Hosking who won the toss and sent the Indians to bat first. Ajit Wadekar top-scored for the Indians making 96, which included 16 boundaries. They declared the innings after scoring 259 in almost three hours. In reply, Western Australia Country ended at 5/189 at stumps. Hosking and Barry Pascoe put together 88 runs for the first wicket.

== Test series ==
=== First Test ===
23–28 December 1967
Scorecard

Australia	v	India
335 (92.1 overs); Bob Cowper 92; Abid Ali 6/55 (17 overs)		307 (71.4 overs); Farokh Engineer 89; Alan Connolly 4/54 (12.4 overs)
369 (88.5 overs); Bob Cowper 108; Rusi Surti 5/74 (20.1 overs)		251 (60.2 overs); V. Subramanya 75; David Renneberg 5/39 (14.2 overs)

Australia won by 146 runs
Adelaide Oval, Adelaide
Umpires: Colin Egar (Aus) and Lou Rowan

- Australia won the toss and decided to bat.
- Paul Sheahan and John Gleeson (both Aus), and Syed Abid Ali and Umesh Kulkarni (both Ind) all made their debut in Tests.
- 24 December was a rest day.

=== Second Test ===
30 December-3 January 1968
Scorecard

India	v	Australia
173 (57.4 overs); Mansoor Ali Khan Pataudi 75; Garth McKenzie 7/66 (21.4 overs)		529 (105.3 overs); Ian Chappell 151; Erapalli Prasanna 6/141 (34 overs)
352 (84.7 overs); Ajit Wadekar 99; Bob Simpson 3/44 (14 overs)

Australia won by an innings and 4 runs
Melbourne Cricket Ground, Melbourne
Umpires: Colin Egar (Aus) and Lou Rowan (Aus)

- India won the toss and decided to bat

=== Third Test ===
19–24 January 1968
Scorecard

Australia	v	India
379 (112.2 overs); Doug Walters 93; Rusi Surti 3/102 (26 overs)		279 (100 overs); Nawab of Pataudi 74; Bob Cowper 3/31 (15 overs)
294 (83.4 overs); Ian Redpath 79; Erapalli Prasanna 6/104 (33.4 overs)		355 (109.6 overs); M. L. Jaisimha 101; Bob Cowper 4/104 (39.6 overs)

Australia won by 39 runs
Brisbane Cricket Ground, Brisbane
Umpires: Colin Egar (Aus) and Lou Rowan (Aus)

- India won the toss and decided to field.
- Eric Freeman (Aus) made his Test debut.

=== Fourth Test ===
26–31 January 1968
Scorecard

Australia	v	India
317 (86.6 overs); Doug Walters 94; Erapalli Prasanna 3/62 (20.6 overs)		268 (85.1 overs); Syed Abid Ali 78; Eric Freeman 4/86 (18.1 overs)
292 (85.3 overs); Bob Cowper 165; Prasanna 4/96 (29.3 overs)		197 (73.6 overs); Syed Abid Ali 81; Bob Simpson 5/59 (23 overs)

Australia won by 144 runs
Sydney Cricket Ground, Sydney
Umpires: Colin Egar (Aus) and Lou Rowan (Aus)

- India won the toss and decided to field.
- Les Joslin (Aus) made his Test debut.

== Annual reviews ==
- Playfair Cricket Annual 1968
- Wisden Cricketers' Almanack 1969
