= Australian cricket team in England in 1968 =

International cricket tour

The Australian cricket team toured England in the 1968 season to play a five-match Test series against England for The Ashes. Australia retained The Ashes after the series was drawn 1-1.

The Australian team played 20 first-class matches outside the test series, winning seven games, losing two and drawing the other eleven matches. One game was abandoned without any play and is not included in the figures. They also played four matches which did not have first-class status, winning two and drawing two.

== Australian squad ==
The Australian squad consisted of Bill Lawry (captain), Ian Chappell, Alan Connolly, Bob Cowper, Eric Freeman, John Gleeson, Neil Hawke, John Inverarity, Barry Jarman, Les Joslin, Ashley Mallett, Graham McKenzie, Ian Redpath, David Renneberg, Paul Sheahan, Brian Taber and Doug Walters.

== Test series summary ==
=== First Test ===
6–11 June 1968
Scorecard

Australia	v	England
357 (130.3 overs); AP Sheahan 88 (210); JA Snow 4/97 (34 overs)		165 (104.3 overs); JH Edrich 49 (176); RM Cowper 4/48 (26 overs)
220 (88 overs); KD Walters 86 (189); PI Pocock 6/79 (33 overs)		253 (110 overs); BL D'Oliveira 87* (188); JW Gleeson 3/44 (30 overs)

Australia won by 159 runs
Old Trafford, Manchester
Umpires: JS Buller and CS Elliott

- Australia won the toss and elected to bat.
- 9 June was taken as a rest day.

=== Second Test ===
20–25 June 1968
Scorecard

England	v	Australia
351/7d (144.3 overs); C Milburn 83 (154); GD McKenzie 3/111 (45 overs)		78 (33.4 overs); KD Walters 26 (57); DJ Brown 5/42 (14 overs)
		127/4 (f/o) (67 overs); IR Redpath 53 (143); DL Underwood 2/8 (18 overs)

Match drawn
Lord's, London
Umpires: JS Buller and AE Fagg

- England won the toss and elected to bat.
- 23 June was taken as a rest day.

=== Third Test ===
11–16 July 1968
Scorecard

England	v	Australia
409 (172.5 overs); MC Cowdrey 104 (247); EW Freeman 4/78 (30.5 overs)		222 (91 overs); IM Chappell 71 (180); R Illingworth 3/37 (22 overs)
142/3d (42 overs); JH Edrich 64 (104); AN Connolly 2/59 (15 overs)		68/1 (28.2 overs); RM Cowper 25* (86); JA Snow 1/32 (9 overs)

Match drawn
Edgbaston, Birmingham
Umpires: CS Elliott and H Yarnold

- England won the toss and elected to bat.
- 14 July was taken as a rest day.
- There was no play on the first day.

=== Fourth Test ===
25–30 July 1968
Scorecard

Australia	v	England
315 (133.4 overs); IR Redpath 92 (176); DL Underwood 4/41 (27.4 overs)		302 (147 overs); RM Prideaux 64 (170); AN Connolly 5/72 (39 overs)
312 (154.1 overs); IM Chappell 81 (228); R Illingworth 6/87 (51 overs)		230/4 (84 overs); JH Edrich 65 (158); AN Connolly 2/68 (31 overs)

Match drawn
Headingley, Leeds
Umpires: JS Buller and AE Fagg

- Australia won the toss and elected to bat.
- 28 July was taken as a rest day.
- RJ Inverarity (AUS), and KWR Fletcher and RM Prideaux (both ENG) made their Test debuts.

=== Fifth Test ===
22–27 August 1968
Scorecard

England	v	Australia
494 (201.2 overs); JH Edrich 164 (422); AA Mallett 3/87 (36 overs)		324 (163.3 overs); WM Lawry 135 (401); DJ Brown 3/63 (22 overs)
181 (58.4 overs); MC Cowdrey 35 (72); AN Connolly 4/65 (22.4 overs)		125 (83.3 overs); RJ Inverarity 56 (253); DL Underwood 7/50 (31.3 overs)

England won by 226 runs
The Oval, London
Umpires: CS Elliott and AE Fagg

- England won the toss and elected to bat.
- 25 August was taken as a rest day.
- AA Mallett (AUS) made his Test debut.

== Annual reviews ==
- Playfair Cricket Annual 1969
- Wisden Cricketers' Almanack 1969
