= West Indian cricket team in Australia in 1968–69 =

International cricket tour

The West Indies cricket team toured Australia in the 1968-69 season and played a five-match Test series against Australia. Australia won the series 3-1 with one match drawn.

== Test series summary ==
=== First Test ===
6–10 December 1968
(5–day match)
Scorecard

West Indies	v	Australia
296 (95 overs); RB Kanhai 94; AN Connolly 4/60 (19 overs)		284 (98.4 overs); IM Chappell 117 (263); LR Gibbs 5/88 (39.4 overs)
353 (87 overs); CH Lloyd 129 (222); JW Gleeson 5/122 (33 overs)		240 (88.6 overs); IM Chappell 50; GS Sobers 6/73 (33.6 overs)

West Indies won by 125 runs
Brisbane Cricket Ground, Woolloongabba, Brisbane
Umpires: CJ Egar and LP Rowan

- West Indies won the toss and elected to bat.
- 9 December was taken as a rest day.
- The match was scheduled for five days but completed in four.

=== Second Test ===
26–30 December 1968
(5–day match)
Scorecard

West Indies	v	Australia
200 (73 overs); RC Fredericks 76 (226); GD McKenzie 8/71 (28 overs)		510 (136.3 overs); WM Lawry 205 (416); GS Sobers 4/97 (33.3 overs)
280 (98.4 overs); SM Nurse 74 (192); JW Gleeson 5/61 (26.4 overs)

Australia won by an innings and 30 runs
Melbourne Cricket Ground, Melbourne
Umpires: CJ Egar and LP Rowan

- Australia won the toss and elected to field.
- 29 December was taken as a rest day.
- The match was scheduled for five days but completed in four.
- CA Davis, RM Edwards and RC Fredericks (all WIN) made their Test debuts.

=== Third Test ===
3–8 January 1969
(5–day match)
Scorecard

West Indies	v	Australia
264 (75.1 overs); CH Lloyd 50 (61); GD McKenzie 4/85 (22.1 overs)		547 (121.6 overs); KD Walters 118 (185); WW Hall 3/113 (26 overs)
324 (93 overs); BF Butcher 101 (233); JW Gleeson 4/91 (26 overs)		0/42 (8 overs); KR Stackpole 21* (31); AP Sheahan 21* (33)

Australia won by 10 wickets
Sydney Cricket Ground, Sydney
Umpires: CJ Egar and LP Rowan

- West Indies won the toss and elected to bat.
- 6 January was taken as a rest day.

=== Fourth Test ===
24–29 January 1969
(5–day match)
Scorecard

West Indies	v	Australia
276 (65.3 overs); GS Sobers 110; EW Freeman 4/52 (10.3 overs)		533 (126.5 overs); KD Walters 110; LR Gibbs 4/145 (43 overs)
616 (137.2 overs); BF Butcher 118; AN Connolly 5/122 (34 overs)		9/339 (84 overs); IM Chappell 96; CC Griffith 2/73 (19 overs)

Match drawn
Adelaide Oval, Adelaide
Umpires: CJ Egar and LP Rowan

- West Indies won the toss and elected to bat.
- 26 January was taken as a rest day.
- The Test set the record for the highest match aggregate in a 5-day Test match (1,764 runs) and held it until the Rawalpindi Test of England's tour of Pakistan from 1–5 December 2022 with a total of 1,768 runs. The aggregate remains the 4th highest in Test history.
- Records related to the high aggregate runs are: most fifties in a Test match, Test match with most runs and no wides being bowled and highest match aggregate without a partnership of 150 runs or more.
- The Test is also one of the closest ever drawn Tests as the match was drawn with nine wickets down with 21 runs required. There are only 4 drawn Test matches ending with nine wickets down and fewer runs remaining. Garry Sobers called it "the most exciting match I have played in next to the tied Test."
- A key element of the exciting fourth innings was the record 4 run outs (an innings record shared with just one other Test match). The first run out was a Mankad run out (Ian Redpath by Charlie Griffith, the second of only 4 such run outs in Test matches). The other run outs were the first three partners of the very fast runner between wickets Paul Sheahan (Doug Walters on 50, Eric Freeman and Barry Jarman). Australia slumped from 4 for 315 to 7 for 322 in their quest for either the 360 target or survival for a draw, with Sheahan left with the tailenders. The pitch was described as "still perfect".

=== Fifth Test ===
14–20 February 1969
(6–day match)
Scorecard

Australia	v	West Indies
619 (152.7 overs); KD Walters 242 (412); WW Hall 3/157 (35.7 overs)		279 (76.6 overs); MC Carew 64 (94); AN Connolly 4/61 (17 overs)
8/394d (92 overs); IR Redpath 132 (277); GS Sobers 3/117 (26 overs)		352 (64.2 overs); SM Nurse 137 (204); JW Gleeson 3/84 (15.2 overs)

Australia won by 382 runs
Sydney Cricket Ground, Sydney
Umpires: CJ Egar and LP Rowan

- West Indies won the toss and elected to field.
- 17 February was taken as a rest day.

== External sources ==
- CricketArchive – tour summaries

== Annual reviews ==
- Playfair Cricket Annual 1969
- Wisden Cricketers' Almanack 1970
