= Australian cricket team in South Africa in 1969–70 =

International cricket tour

	South Africa	Australia
- Dates: 6 January 1970 – 19 March 1970
Captains	Ali Bacher	Bill Lawry

Test series
- Result: South Africa won the 4-match series 4–0
Most runs	Graeme Pollock (517)	Ian Redpath (283)
Most wickets	Mike Procter (26)	Alan Connolly (20)

The Australian national cricket team toured South Africa from January to March 1970, and played a four-match Test series against the South African national cricket team. South Africa won the Test series 4–0. Australia were captained by Bill Lawry and South Africa by Ali Bacher.

It was the last official Test series to involve South Africa for 22 years, and the 1970 South African team has been held to be one of the greatest in the history of cricket.

== Squads ==
South Africa	Australia
Ali Bacher (c); Eddie Barlow; Grahame Chevalier; Dennis Gamsy (wk); Trevor Goddard; Lee Irvine; Tiger Lance; Denis Lindsay (wk); Graeme Pollock; Peter Pollock; Mike Procter; Barry Richards; Kelly Seymour; John Traicos; Pat Trimborn	Bill Lawry (c); Ian Chappell (vc); Alan Connolly; Eric Freeman; John Gleeson; Jock Irvine; Ray Jordon (wk); Ashley Mallett; Laurie Mayne; Graham McKenzie; Ian Redpath; Paul Sheahan; Keith Stackpole; Brian Taber (wk); Doug Walters

== Test series summary ==
=== First Test ===
22–27 January 1970
(5-day match)
Scorecard

South Africa	v	Australia
382 (167.1 overs); EJ Barlow 127 (322); AA Mallett 5/126 (55.1 overs)		164 (66.4 overs); KD Walters 73 (148); PM Pollock 4/20 (12 overs)
232 (96 overs); RG Pollock 50 (130); AN Connolly 5/47 (26 overs)		280 (129.1 overs); WM Lawry 83 (175); MJ Procter 4/47 (17 overs)

South Africa won by 170 runs
Newlands, Cape Town
Umpires: G Goldman and WW Wade

- South Africa won the toss and elected to bat.
- 25 January was taken as a rest day.
- GA Chevalier, D Gamsy, BL Irvine and BA Richards (all SA) made their Test debuts.

=== Second Test ===
5–9 February 1970
(5-day match)
Scorecard

South Africa	v	Australia
622/9d (167.5 overs); RG Pollock 274 (401); JW Gleeson 3/160 (51 overs)		157 (48.2 overs); AP Sheahan 62 (107); EJ Barlow 3/24 (10 overs)
		336 (f/o) (131.2 overs); KD Walters 74 (154); IR Redpath 74* (236); MJ Procter 3/62 (18.5 overs)

South Africa won by an innings and 129 runs
Kingsmead, Durban
Umpires: CMP Coetzee and JG Draper

- South Africa won the toss and elected to bat.
- 8 February was taken as a rest day.
- The match was scheduled for five days but completed in four.
- AJ Traicos (SA) made his Test debut.
- BA Richards scored his maiden Test century

=== Third Test ===
19–24 February 1970
(5-day match)
Scorecard

South Africa	v	Australia
279 (102.4 overs); BL Irvine 79 (126); JW Gleeson 3/61 (21.4 overs)		202 (91.2 overs); KD Walters 64 (136); PM Pollock 5/39 (23.2 overs)
408 (121.3 overs); EJ Barlow 110 (252); JW Gleeson 5/125 (45 overs)		178 (77.5 overs); IR Redpath 66 (202); MJ Procter 3/24 (14 overs)

South Africa won by 307 runs
New Wanderers, Johannesburg
Umpires: CMP Coetzee and AJ Warner

- South Africa won the toss and elected to bat.
- 22 February was taken as a rest day.

=== Fourth Test ===
5–10 March 1970
(5-day match)
Scorecard

South Africa	v	Australia
311 (123.2 overs); BA Richards 81 (178); AN Connolly 6/47 (28.2 overs)		212 (76.1 overs); AP Sheahan 67 (137); MJ Procter 3/30 (25.1 overs)
470/8d (121.2 overs); BA Richards 126 (212); LC Mayne 3/83 (29 overs)		246 (90.3 overs); AP Sheahan 46 (64); MJ Procter 6/73 (24 overs)

South Africa won by 323 runs
St George's Park, Port Elizabeth
Umpires: CMP Coetzee and AJ Warner

- South Africa won the toss and elected to bat.
- 8 March was taken as a rest day.
- This was the last Test match South Africa would play until 1992.

== See also ==
- Australian cricket team in Ceylon and India in 1969–70 (31 October – 28 December 1969) immediately preceding the trip to South Africa
