= Australian cricket team in India in 1964–65 =

International cricket tour

Australian cricket team in India in 1964-65
	Australia	India
- Dates: 2 October – 22 October 1964
Captains	Bob Simpson	Nawab of Pataudi, Jr.

Test series
- Result: 3-match series drawn 1–1
Most runs	Bob Simpson (292)	Nawab of Pataudi, Jr. (270)
Most wickets	Graham McKenzie (13)	Bapu Nadkarni (17)

The Australian national cricket team played three Test matches in India against the India national cricket team in 1964–65. The three-Test series was drawn, with the Australians taking the first Test, the Indians winning the second, and the third match drawn.

== Squads ==
India	Australia
Mansoor Ali Khan Pataudi (c); Abbas Ali Baig; Chandu Borde; B. S. Chandrasekhar; Salim Durani; Farokh Engineer; Indrajitsinhji; M. L. Jaisimha; Vijay Manjrekar; Bapu Nadkarni; Dilip Sardesai; Hanumant Singh; A. G. Kripal Singh; Vasant Ranjane; Venkataraman Subramanya; Rusi Surti	Bob Simpson (c); Brian Booth; Peter Burge; Alan Connolly; Bob Cowper; Wally Grout; Neil Hawke; Barry Jarman; Bill Lawry; Johnny Martin; Graham McKenzie; Norm O'Neill; Ian Redpath; Rex Sellers; Tom Veivers

The Australian touring party came to India after their tour of England. They arrived in Madras, the venue of the First Test, on 30 September 1964. Their team for the Test was named the next day. Only one change was made from the team that drew the final Test against England at The Oval a few weeks prior — paceman Grahame Corling was replaced by left-arm spin bowler Johnny Martin. Tom Veivers and Bob Simpson were other players who could bowl spin in their squad.

The India team for the First Test was named on 29 September 1964. Rusi Surti was named the twelfth man, and Abbas Ali Baig, Farokh Engineer, B. S. Chandrasekhar and Venkataraman Subramanya, the reserves. Indrajitsinhji was included as the only uncapped player in the squad. The squad had only one medium-fast bowler in Vasant Ranjane.

== Series summary ==
=== 1st Test ===
2–7 October 1964
Scorecard

Australia	v	India
211 (72 overs); Bill Lawry 62; Bapu Nadkarni 5/31 (18 overs)		276 (132.3 overs); Nawab of Pataudi, Jr. 128*; Garth McKenzie 6/58 (32.3 overs)
397 (158.4 overs); Bob Simpson 77; Bapu Nadkarni 6/91 (54.4 overs)		193 (80 overs); Hanumant Singh 94; Garth McKenzie 4/33 (20 overs)

Australia won by 139 runs
Corporate Stadium, Madras
Umpires: M. V. Nagendra and Samar Roy

- Australia won the toss and elected to bat.
- Indrajitsinhji (Ind) made his debut in Tests.
- Bob Simpson (Aus) reached 2,000 runs in Tests.
- 5 October was a rest day.

=== 2nd Test ===
10–15 October 1964
scorecard

Australia	v	India
320 (103.5 overs); Peter Burge 80; Bhagwat Chandrasekhar 4/50 (26 overs)		341 (152.3 overs); Nawab of Pataudi, Jr. 86; Tom Veivers 4/68 (48 overs)
274 (99.4 overs); Bob Cowper 81; Bapu Nadkarni 4/33 (20.4 overs)		256/8 (128.4 overs); Dilip Sardesai 56; Alan Connolly 3/24 (18 overs)

India won by two wickets
Brabourne Stadium, Bombay
Umpires: Habib Choudhury and S. K. Raghunatha Rao

- Australia won the toss and elected to bat.
- Peter Burge (Aus) and Vijay Manjrekar (Ind) reached 2,000 and 3,000 runs respectively in Tests.
- 13 October was a rest day.

=== 3rd Test ===
17–22 October 1964
scorecard

Australia	v	India
174 (84.5 overs); Bob Simpson 67; Salim Durani 6/73 (28 overs)		235 (130 overs); Chandu Borde 68; Bob Simpson 4/45 (28 overs)
143/1 (46 overs); Bob Simpson 71; Rusi Surti 1/37 (10 overs)

Match drawn
Eden Gardens, Calcutta
Umpires: Sambhu Pan and Badami Satyaji Rao

- India won the toss and elected to bat.
- Play was not possible partly on day 4 and completely on day 5 due to rain.
- Rex Sellers (Aus) made his debut in Tests.
- 13 October was a rest day.
