= John Snow (cricketer) =

English cricketer (born 1941)

Personal information
- Full name: John Augustine Snow
- Born: 13 October 1941 (age 85); Peopleton, Worcestershire, England
- Nickname: Snowy
- Height: 5 ft 11 in (1.80 m)
- Batting: Right-handed
- Bowling: Right-arm fast
- Role: Bowler

International information
- National side: England
- Test debut (cap 428): 17 June 1965 v New Zealand
- Last Test: 27 July 1976 v West Indies
- ODI debut (cap 11): 5 January 1971 v Australia
- Last ODI: 18 June 1975 v Australia

Domestic team information
- Years: Team
- 1961–1977: Sussex
- 1980: Warwickshire

Career statistics
Competition	Test	ODI	FC	LA
Matches	49	9	346	182
Runs scored	772	9	4,832	1,209
Batting average	13.54	4.50	14.17	12.86
100s/50s	0/2	0/0	0/11	0/2
Top score	73	5*	73*	57
Balls bowled	12,021	538	60,995	8,882
Wickets	202	14	1,174	251
Bowling average	26.66	16.57	22.73	19.34
5 wickets in innings	6	0	56	2
10 wickets in match	1	0	9	0
Best bowling	7/40	4/11	8/87	5/15
Catches/stumpings	16/–	1/–	125/–	34/–
- Source: CricketArchive, 15 July 2009

John Augustine Snow (born 13 October 1941) is a retired English international cricketer who played for Sussex from 1961 to 1977 and represented England in 49 Test matches. He was born in Peopleton, Worcestershire.

A right-arm fast bowler, Snow led the England attack from 1965 to 1976 and bridged the gap between Fred Trueman and Bob Willis; he played with both of them at either end of his career. His main achievements were bowling England to victory against West Indies in 1967–68, and against Australia in 1970–71. Snow batted right-handed as a useful tail-ender who scored eleven first-class half-centuries. He was considered a good outfielder with a strong throw. He was selected by Wisden Cricketers' Almanack (Wisden) as one of the five Wisden Cricketers of the Year in its 1973 edition. In 1974, his Sussex benefit season realised £18,000 (£137,811 in 2021 terms).

Snow was involved in several on-field incidents stemming from his aggressive, short-pitched bowling. He was considered difficult to handle, had definite ideas on how and when he should bowl and was disciplined by both Sussex and England, but he fitted the public image of a fiery fast bowler. His disdain for the cricketing authorities at Sussex and Lord's was aptly summed up in the title of his 1976 autobiography, Cricket Rebel, as was his decision to join World Series Cricket in 1977.

== Early life ==
John Snow was born on 13 October 1941 in Peopleton, Worcestershire. His father, the Reverend William Snow, was a Scottish vicar who had taken up his living in the village of Elmley Castle, part of the Worcester Diocese. The Reverend Snow was a keen cricketer who wanted his son to become a first-class player. From the age of four, coached by his father, Snow learned how to play in the vicarage garden. His mother and three sisters joined in, mainly as fielders. As remarked in Wisden Cricketers' Almanack, the scenario recalled the Grace family in the 1850s. In April 1948, when Snow was six, his father took him to New Road, Worcester where Don Bradman was playing for the Australian tourists against Worcestershire. The Australians won the match by innings and 17 runs.

In the 1950s, the family left Worcestershire and moved to Sussex after the Reverend Snow was appointed to a ministry in Bognor Regis. Snow went to school at Christ's Hospital, near Horsham. He played cricket there and was coached by the former Warwickshire player Len Bates, who encouraged him to become a fast bowler. Snow played for the school's first XI as an all-rounder in his last two years there (1957–1958). When he was sixteen, his future teammate Ken Suttle recommended him to Sussex County Cricket Club as a promising batsman. Suttle held out little hope for Snow as a bowler, though, telling Sussex that "he sprays it around like a garden hose". Snow recalled that he decided to take Bates' advice because "more boys wanted to bat than bowl".

He joined the Bognor Colts club, whose former players included Peter May and David Sheppard. Snow played for the Colts against a team from the Antilles and was bowled out by Frank Worrell. At Sussex, he began playing in matches for their Junior Marlets team and, in 1960, the Sussex Young Amateurs. Snow also played rugby throughout his teens, as a full-back, but he gave up the game in 1961 to concentrate on cricket and education.

After he left Christ's Hospital, he was at the Chichester High School for Boys for a year. He gained a place at the Teachers' Training College in Culham, near Abingdon, Oxfordshire, taking a three-year course studying geography and physical education. As part of his training, he taught at Woodingdean County Primary School in what is now East Sussex to qualify as a teacher. During that time, he was only available for cricket in July and August, during the summer holidays.

== Cricket playing career ==
=== Bowling action ===
In the early part of his career, Snow was classed as a seam bowler of fast-medium pace. He tended to bowl chest-on, which enabled him to bowl in-swing but restricted his speed.

==== Change of action at age 24 ====
During the winter of 1965–1966, at age 24 and having already played for England, Snow changed his action towards the classic sideways-on style used by Fred Trueman and other top bowlers. He did this while coaching and playing club cricket in South Africa, and Snow has said the process was helped by the less intense playing schedule in South Africa and the hard, fast and bouncy wickets. His work was successful and he became "a bowler of genuine pace". He also became able to bowl from nearer the wicket and with more control. His new style also pleased the purists who referred to his "graceful, yet deadly, action", and "beautifully easy and controlled bowling method, slanting the ball into the batsman but also cutting it sharply off the pitch". He had the ability, like Charlie Griffith of the West Indies, to drop the ball slightly short and "get it to lift painfully into the batsmen's body".

=== County career with Sussex ===
==== First-class debut ====
On 19 August 1961, when Snow was aged 19, he made his first-class debut for Sussex against Glamorgan at Cardiff Arms Park in a County Championship match. Sussex, captained by Don Smith, won the toss and chose to bat first. Snow was ninth man in and scored 12 runs in a total of 270. He was brought on to bowl near the end of the Glamorgan innings and took the wickets of Brian Evans (caught behind by Jim Parks) and Don Shepherd (caught by Richard Langridge) for a return of 2/12 in just 4.2 overs. Glamorgan were all out for 95. With a lead of 175, Sussex batted again and Smith declared during the final morning at 197/3, setting Glamorgan a target of 373 to win. Despite a century by Jim Pressdee, Glamorgan were all out for 248 and Sussex won by 124 runs. Snow bowled fifteen overs and took 3/67. His victims were Pressdee (caught by Robin Waters for 115), Don Ward (lbw) and Evans (bowled).

On 30 August, Snow made his home debut at the Manor Sports Ground in Worthing against Leicestershire, who won by 62 runs after Maurice Hallam scored 203* and 143*. Snow's figures were 1/76 and 0/19; he took the wicket of Robin Gardner who was caught by Langridge for 18. Batting at number 11, Snow scored 15* and 35*.

Also in 1961, Snow made his debut for the Sussex Second XI and played in six Second XI Championship matches between 6 July and 29 August. He played in five more matches for the Second XI over the next three seasons; his last appearance was in May 1964.

==== 1962–1977 ====
Snow made only one appearance in 1962 but his availability increased in 1963 and he played in twelve matches for Sussex, taking 29 wickets at 24.55. He achieved five wickets in an innings for the first time when he took 6/52 (8/85 in the match) against Derbyshire on the Central Recreation Ground at Hastings, although Sussex lost the match by 13 runs. In 1964, now playing a full season, he became a first team regular and, having taken 77 wickets at 22.20, was awarded his county cap. Sussex won the first two Gillette Cup competitions in 1963 and 1964. Snow played in both finals, taking 3/13 on his limited overs debut against Worcestershire in 1963, and 2/28 against Warwickshire in 1964.

In the early 1960s, Sussex had four specialist seam bowlers but for spin bowling they could only use the limited skills of their batsmen. This team structure served its purpose in the Gillette Cup and on the "green wicket" at Hove, but not elsewhere. Snow believes the lack of at least one specialist spin bowler cost them the County Championship in 1963, when they finished fourth, let down by being unable to win enough away matches.

Snow played for Sussex until 1977 and, taking 883 wickets (21.30), was by far their most successful bowler of the 1960s and 1970s. He was awarded a benefit season in 1974, which realised £18,000 (worth £137,811 in 2021). In 1975, he took his best first-class bowling figures of 8/87 (11/112 in the match) playing for Sussex against Middlesex at Lord's; Sussex won by 8 wickets.

=== Test career ===
==== New Zealand and South Africa, 1965 ====
Snow made his Test debut for England against New Zealand at Lord's in the second Test of the 1965 series. New Zealand had already slumped to 28–4 when Snow was brought on, and he took two wickets before lunch: New Zealand captain John Reid was caught behind by Jim Parks and wicket-keeper Artie Dick was clean bowled. Snow strained a side muscle before the third Test, but returned to play in the second Test against South Africa at Trent Bridge. Here, brothers Graeme (126) and Peter Pollock (10/87) won the match for South Africa. Snow (1/63 & 3/83) was dropped for the last Test and was not included in the squad for the 1965–1966 tour of Australia.

==== 1966–1967 ====
In 1966, Gary Sobers' powerful West Indies team toured England and Snow was recalled after taking 7/29 and 4/18 against them at Hove, Sussex winning by 9 wickets. He took 4/84 and 0/117 in the third Test at Trent Bridge and 3/143 in the fourth at Headingley but the West Indies won them both to go 3–0 up in the series and Yorkshire's Brian Close was made captain for the final Test at The Oval. Snow was initially dropped for the match, but was recalled due to an injury sustained by John Price, then considered the fastest bowler in England.

England collapsed to 166/7, before Tom Graveney (165) and John Murray (112) consolidated, but it still left England short of a commanding score until Snow hit eight boundaries in his 59 not out and added 128 for the tenth wicket with fellow bowler Ken Higgs, who made 63. This was two runs short of the then Test record for the tenth wicket. Snow's 59 not out was the first Test 50 by an England number 11 batsman and remained a record until Jimmy Anderson made 81 against India in 2014. Snow removed the West Indian openers Conrad Hunte and Easton McMorris for 12 runs in the second innings before Close caught Sobers off him for a first ball duck and England went on to win by an innings and 34 runs.

This match established Snow as an England regular and, until 1973, he was the team's premier fast bowler. The Test was the first in a run of forty with only one defeat, until 1971, of which Snow played in 32. There was no overseas tour in 1966–67 and, in the summer of 1967, Snow took 13 wickets (30.00) against India and Pakistan, but missed the last two Tests because of a back injury.

==== West Indies, 1967–68 ====
Snow was selected for the MCC tour of the West Indies in 1967–68. Although he was not picked for the first Test, which was drawn, he had the advantage of being fully acclimatised when the second Test in Jamaica began. Snow took 7/49 in Jamaica, his victims including Gary Sobers, who was out lbw for another first ball duck, and Basil Butcher, as West Indies were dismissed for 143. Rioting interrupted play when the crowd objected to Butcher's dismissal, even though he walked. Riot police and tear gas were used to restore order.

In the Barbados Test, Sobers decided to bat on a flat wicket, but Snow with 5/80 restricted them to 349. England made 449 and the home team batted out the game with 284/6, Snow claiming 3/39. England won the series at Trinidad after a controversially sporting declaration by Sobers gave England two and three quarter hours to make 215 for victory, which they did for the loss of three wickets with three minutes to spare. Snow finished the series with 4/84 and 6/60 in Guyana, his 10/144 being his best match figures in Test cricket.

Snow took 27 wickets @ 18.66 in four Tests, the most wickets taken by an England bowler in a series in the West Indies. The record was equalled by Angus Fraser in 1997–98 when he took 27 wickets @ 18.22 in six Tests.

==== Australia, 1968 ====
In 1968, the Australians toured England and they retained The Ashes in a rain-impacted 1–1 series draw. They beat England by 159 runs in the first Test at Old Trafford, Snow taking 4/94 on his Ashes debut, but England had only one spinner on a wicket that increasingly turned. In the next Test at Lord's, Australia were out for 78 (Snow 1/14) and followed on, but the match was drawn because of rain. It is also notable as the first of 27 consecutive Tests through 1968 to 1971 that England would play without losing, of which Snow played in 22. The final Test at The Oval was won by Derek Underwood with three minutes to spare after the ground was flooded. Snow recalled that he and the other eight fielders were almost playing "Ring a Ring o' Roses" by clustering around the Australian batsman. Snow took 3/67 in the first innings and ended the series with 17 wickets (29.08), only Underwood with 20 wickets (15.10) taking more.

==== Ceylon and Pakistan, 1968–69 ====
Snow's second tour was to Ceylon and then to East and West Pakistan. East Pakistan was in a state of confusion, with armed students taking control of Dacca. Snow says the MCC team were assured by the British High Commission that they would be safe, although they themselves were making plans for an emergency evacuation. Eventually, the tour was abandoned when rioting broke out on the third day of the Test in Lahore and the stadium was set on fire.

==== West Indies, 1969 ====
The England selectors made the surprise choice of Ray Illingworth to replace the injured Colin Cowdrey as England captain. Illingworth was another tough Yorkshireman like Close, but he had recently moved to Leicestershire as captain in 1969 following a contract dispute. He was seen as a caretaker captain, but he made the job his own and kept it after Cowdrey had recovered. Snow says he respected and appreciated Illingworth's captaincy because "he harboured and nurtured his bowlers like no other captain I have served".

Illingworth started well as West Indies crashed to 147 all out (Snow taking 4/54) at Old Trafford. England won by an innings. At Lord's, West Indies chose to bat and reached 324/5 before Snow took five wickets to dismiss them for 380. Illingworth saved the English innings with a century to cement his place as captain and the Test ended in a thrilling draw when England needed just 37 runs with three wickets in hand. During this match, Snow wrote his poem "Lord's Test".

In the third Test at Headingley, there was a problem after Illingworth asked Snow to "give me everything you've got" when the West Indians were 240/7 and needing 303 to win. Snow found the pitch lifeless and changed his action to medium-paced seamers, but he failed to take a wicket and Illingworth was not best pleased. England still won the Test by 30 runs and the series 2–0. Snow was the chief wicket-taker with 15 @ 27.06. It was the last time England would defeat West Indies until the 2000 series.

==== New Zealand, 1969 ====
Snow was left out of the England team for the first Test against New Zealand at Lord's. He was replaced by Alan Ward. Snow was annoyed because it meant a television programme about his poetry, due to be filmed at Lord's, had to be cancelled. He said in his autobiography that Alec Bedser, the chairman of selectors, told him he had been dropped because they wanted see how Ward would perform in a Test match. Later, however, he received a phone call from Illingworth during the Essex v Sussex match. Illingworth told Snow he had been dropped for disobeying orders in the previous Test at Headingley. Snow responded with match-winning performances against Essex (6/20) and Hampshire (5/29 & 5/51) to give Sussex their first two wins of the season. He says he sorted out his differences with Illingworth and: "I was to know exactly where I stood with him as did every other player who came under his captaincy". He was recalled for the second and third Tests against New Zealand.

==== Rest of the World, 1970 ====
South Africa had been due to tour in 1970, but this was cancelled in the aftermath of the Basil d'Oliveira Affair, amid concerns about anti-apartheid demonstrations. Rather than send an unprepared team to Australia, MCC created a Rest of the World XI of the overseas players in the County Championship. Led by Gary Sobers, their matches were given the status of "unofficial Tests", but the runs scored and wickets taken were added to official Test statistics until it was decided by the International Cricket Council (ICC) that they should not count. England were beaten by what was arguably the strongest team ever assembled and did well to win one of the "Tests" and strongly contest two others. Snow took 19 wickets (35.84) with 4/120 at Edgbaston, 4/82 at Headingley and 4/81 at The Oval.

==== Australia, 1970–71 ====
The highlight of Snow's Test career was the tour of Australia in 1970–71. He was easily the outstanding bowler in the series, taking 31 wickets (22.83) to help England regain the Ashes. He was repeatedly warned over his short-pitched bowling, but the Australians had no real answer to his pace and fire.

In the first Test at Brisbane, Bill Lawry won the toss and decided to bat on a good wicket, but became Snow's 100th Test victim, caught by Alan Knott for 4. Australia reached 418–3, but Snow took four late wickets to dismiss them for 433, ending with 6/114. He took 4/143 in the second Test at Perth, having Australia 17/3 before they rebuilt their innings. Both these Tests were draws, and the third was abandoned. The first-ever One Day International (ODI) was arranged instead, Snow making his ODI debut.

The fourth Test, at Sydney, proved decisive. In the second innings, Snow achieved his best Test bowling return of 7/40. He soon dismissed Ian Chappell, Ian Redpath and Greg Chappell. Australia were overnight at 66/4. Next morning, Snow had Keith Stackpole caught, followed by Rod Marsh for a duck. Graham McKenzie retired hurt after a Snow bouncer hit him in the face. Snow then bowled John Gleeson and Alan Connolly for ducks and Australia were all out for 116, Lawry carrying his bat. It was an outstanding piece of fast bowling from Snow, aggressive, hostile and decisive. England won by 299 runs, their biggest victory in Australia since 1936–37, to lead the series. This margin was held until the seventh and last Test, also held at Sydney.

===== Snow-Jenner incident =====
In the final Test, Terry Jenner retired hurt after he ducked into a short delivery from Snow in the first innings. Umpire Lou Rowan warned the fast bowler for intimidatory bowling yet again, but Snow and Illingworth objected strongly. Snow recalled Illingworth saying: "That's the only bouncer he's bowled" and that he would complain to the Australian Cricket Board (ACB). Rowan later claimed Illingworth and Snow swore at him, which they denied. The bowler was loudly booed and "when he returned to his fielding position at long-leg Snow was pelted with bottles, cans and partially-eaten pies".

Some of the crowd, in the Paddington Hill area of the ground, wanted to shake Snow's hand but then he was grabbed by a drunk who was forced to let go by other spectators. In 1998, 88-year old Trevor Guy told The Sydney Morning Herald that he was the man who had grabbed Snow in order to tell him what he thought about him hitting Jenner. Guy and Snow, in Australia for the 1998–99 Ashes series agreed there were no hard feelings.

To avoid injury to his team, Illingworth took his men back to the dressing room without the permission of the umpires, an unprecedented move in Test cricket. The England manager Clark tried to push Illingworth back onto the field and Alan Barnes of the ACB demanded that they return immediately or they would forfeit the match and the Ashes. A furious Illingworth said he would not return until the playing area had been cleared and the crowd had calmed down.

Jenner returned to bat at 235–8 and made a brave 30, last man out on 264 to give Australia a lead of 80 runs. England scored 302 in their second innings and set Australia 223 to win. Snow took a wicket in his first over, but smashed his finger on the wooden boundary fence trying to catch a six off Stackpole. He was taken to hospital and needed surgery. England's spinners did the job, dismissing Australia for 160 to win by 62 runs and regain the Ashes while Snow was on the operating table. Snow's 31 wickets (22.83) was the most by an England bowler in Australia since Harold Larwood's 33 wickets (19.51) in 1932–33.

===== Trouble with management =====
Snow wrote that the series in Australia "emphasised the gulf between players and administrators" and "I was sick of the biased attitude and incompetence which was apparent in cricket administration". The MCC tour manager was David Clark, described by Illingworth as "an amiable, but somewhat ineffectual man", and there were soon divisions between him and the players.

After Snow had bowled more than 50 eight-ball overs in the first Test he was rested for the state match against Western Australia, but Clark insisted that he practice in the nets with the others. Snow bowled a couple of desultory overs and Clark berated him for five minutes after which Snow told him "that as far as my good conduct money was concerned he could swallow it" and went walkabout until the next day. Illingworth smoothed things over but, after the second Test, Clark criticised both captains for cautious play, Snow for his short-pitched bowling and indicated that he would prefer to see Australia win 3–1 than see four more draws. The team only discovered this when they read the newspapers at the airport.

As a result, Illingworth effectively took over the running of the tour with the support of the players and Clark's influence declined. When the team returned to England, Illingworth said "all hell would break loose" if any player was denied his good conduct bonus. That did not happen but Snow and Geoff Boycott had to report to Lord's for a dressing down by MCC Secretary Billy Griffith about some of their behaviour.

===== Problems with umpires =====
After six Tests, no Australian batsman had been given out lbw in the series, whereas five English batsmen had. Snow said this formed the clearest evidence of umpiring bias in the minds of the England players. In the fifth Test, Max O'Connell made the worst decision in the series when he called "over" and turned to walk to square leg after Snow bowled the last ball of the first over. As a result, he missed Alan Knott catching Stackpole and had to give him not out. This was O'Connell's first over in Test cricket and Snow "could quite understand his actions which illustrate the pressure umpires are also under in a Test", and they were able to joke about it afterwards.

Snow had problems with Lou Rowan, who retired at the end of the series. In 1972, Rowan wrote The Umpire's Story which was highly critical of the England team, particularly of Illingworth and Snow. In return, Snow devoted a whole chapter to "Bitter Rows with Umpire Rowan" in his autobiography Cricket Rebel. Rowan in particular warned Snow for his short-pitched bowling and Snow thought this was partisanship as Alan Thomson was not called to book when he bowled bouncers at Snow and six in one eight-ball over against Ray Illingworth. Snow was twice warned by Rowan for intimidatory bowling in the second Test at Perth, but refused to accept that rib-high balls were intimidatory and continued to bowl them. As a result, Snow was given an official warning, which meant that he would not be allowed to bowl if he was warned again. Illingworth told him that this was to be his last over in any case and the fast bowler sent his last ball flying over the head of Doug Walters, turned to Rowan and said: "Now that's a bouncer for you".

==== India, 1971 ====
Snow was exhausted after the long tour of Australia and, apart from his broken finger, he was suffering from a strained back and shoulder. He was dropped from the Sussex team because his "bowling performances, and more especially his fielding have been so lacking in effort that the selection committee had no alternative". However, instead of playing for the Sussex Second XI, Snow was declared unfit by his doctor and missed the first half of the season and the whole Test series against Pakistan. He recovered to take 4/45 & 7/73 against Essex

Snow was then picked for the first Test against India at Lord's. He rescued the England first innings when he came in at 183/7 and made 73 to hoist the total up to 304. This was Snow's highest Test and equal highest first-class score, but Snow was disappointed not to realise his boyhood dream of a century at Lord's when he was caught off a Chandrasekhar googly.

===== Snow-Gavaskar incident =====
India needed 183 to win in the fourth innings. Snow had the opener Ashok Mankad caught by Knott for 8 and India were 21–2 when Sunil Gavaskar was called for a quick single after hitting the ball to mid-wicket. Snow went for the ball and knocked him over, "I could imagine the horror on the faces of everybody watching the game from the committee room at Lord's". They were both uninjured, got up and continued with the game after Snow tossed Gavaskar's bat back to him. A similar incident had happened in Georgetown in 1967–68 with Clive Lloyd, but the 5'4" Indian received far more sympathy than the 6'4" West Indian who had nearly trampled Snow into the ground. From afar, the incident had looked much worse and was replayed repeatedly on slow-motion television followed by a media furore and the press demanding disciplinary action. The replay can be seen in the Indian episode of the BBC documentary Empire of Cricket. Many were more angry about Snow throwing the bat back than about the collision.

At lunch when Snow returned to the dressing room, he apologised to Alec Bedser, and promised he would do likewise to Gavaskar. Snow was about to do that when an enraged Billy Griffith charged in and shouted: "That's the most disgusting thing I've ever seen on the field". Illingworth told Griffith to get out and Snow apologised to Gavaskar on the field after lunch. When he later saw the replay of the incident, Snow said: "Oh well, the scene's been far too quiet without me anyway". He accepted that he was bound to be dropped for the second Test. The first Test ended in a draw after it was rained off. India needed 38 runs to win, but with only two wickets in hand. Rain also caused the second Test to be drawn.

Snow returned for the third Test at The Oval and tore off Gavaskar's chain and medallion with a bouncer that zipped under his chin and made him fall over. He bowled Gavaskar for 6 in the first innings and had him lbw for a duck in the second, but this was not enough to prevent India winning the Test by four wickets and the series with it. This was only the second Test defeat Snow had conceded since he had become an England regular in 1966 and it ended England's run of 27 Tests without loss.

==== Australia, 1972 ====
There was no tour in 1971–72 and in 1972 Ian Chappell's young team met the England veterans of 1970–71. England won the limited overs Prudential Trophy 2–1, Snow taking 3/35 at Lord's. Australia lost the first Test at Old Trafford by 89 runs thanks to Snow, who took 4/41 & 4/87. They fought back at Lord's where Bob Massie's swing bowling took 16/137. Snow took 5/57 to peg back the Australians to a 36-run lead in the first innings, but couldn't stop Australia's first win in the Ashes for 13 Tests. At Trent Bridge in the drawn third Test, Snow dismissed Ian and Greg Chappell, Doug Walters, Ross Edwards and Massie with 5/92 in the first innings and Stackpole, Greg Chappell and Walters with 3/94 in the second as England held out for a draw.

Snow took only two wickets at Headingley as "Deadly" Derek Underwood spun England to an Ashes retaining victory with 10/82, but he was the second highest scorer in the England first innings, adding 104 with Illingworth (57) before he was stumped for 48 and given a standing ovation by the Yorkshire crowd. With the Ashes safe, England lost the fifth Test at The Oval by 5 wickets, Snow taking only one wicket after a Dennis Lillee bouncer bruised his wrist in the first innings, leading to more accusations that he did not try in the Australian fourth innings run chase. Even so, he was easily the leading England wicket-taker with 24 (23.12).

==== New Zealand, 1973 ====
Along with Illingworth, Geoff Boycott and John Edrich, Snow declined to tour India in 1972–73, wanting to rest his back for the summer and concerned about the dysentery he had caught in Pakistan in 1968–69. Tony Lewis led the team, but lost 2–1 and Illingworth was re-appointed captain against New Zealand in 1973. In the first Test at Trent Bridge Snow took 3/23 as New Zealand were shot out for 97 in the first innings and lost by 38 runs, but went for 2/104 in the second innings and 3/109 at Lord's before bouncing back with 2/52 and 3/34 in the innings victory at Headingley. Geoff Arnold took the most wickets with 16 (21.93) and Snow's 13 wickets (24.61) suffered in comparison, but he returned 4/32 in England's 5 wicket win in the One Day International at Swansea.

==== West Indies, 1973 ====
Kanhai returned with the West Indies for the second half of the summer and more than made up the previous two series defeats with a 2–0 victory. They won the first Test at The Oval by 158 runs, Snow, bowled for 0 & 1 by Keith Boyce and hit for 0/71 in the first innings, was described as lethargic by his critics. The wickets of Kanhai, Lloyd and Sobers in the second innings (3/62) could not save him and he was dropped. He was aged only 31, but it appeared to be the end of his Test career. England were due to tour the Caribbean in 1973–74, but Illingworth was sacked within minutes of losing the disastrous third Test at Lord's by an innings and 226 runs and Mike Denness was appointed instead.

==== Missed England tours ====
Denness asked for Snow to go to the West Indies in 1973–74, remembering his record 27 wickets (18.66) in 1967–68, but Alec Bedser as chairman of selectors overruled him because Snow "was not a good team man". Denness drew the series 1–1, beat India 3–0 and drew 0–0 with Pakistan in 1974. He expressly asked for Snow for the upcoming tour of Australia, but when "Alec accepted the managership in Australia, Snow's chances flew out the window". Denness lost heavily to the hostile pace of Lillee and Jeff Thomson and despite numerous injuries to batsmen and bowlers alike, Snow was not sent as a replacement.

==== D. H. Robins' XI in South Africa, 1973–74 ====
As he could not tour the West Indies, Snow toured South Africa with D. H. Robins' XI. The team included John Edrich and John Gleeson under the leadership of Brian Close, who was a strong advocate of maintaining cricketing ties. Despite playing two "Tests" against a South African Invitation XI, the tour did not produce the strong reaction encountered by the "Rebel" tours of the 1980s. Snow took 18 wickets (22.83) including 4/91 in the Durban "Test". They beat Natal and Eastern Province and drew the other games.

==== World Cup, 1975 ====
The inaugural World Cup was held in England in 1975 and Snow was recalled after England's disastrous tour of Australia. He took 0/24 off 12 overs against India at Lord's in England's record 202-run victory, 4/11 against East Africa at Edgbaston, his best bowling in a One Day International, and 2/32 off 12 overs against Australia as England lost the semi-final at Headingley. His average of 10.83 (6 wickets taken) was the third best in the series and the best for England.

==== Australia, 1975 ====
South Africa had been due to tour in 1975, but that series had been cancelled years before and the Australians were asked to stay for a four-match series after the World Cup. Snow was recalled after almost two years for the first Test at Edgbaston and was the best England bowler with 3/86, but Australia won by an innings and it cost Denness the captaincy. He was replaced by Tony Greig, a combative 6'7" South African-born all-rounder who had been Snow's Sussex team-mate since 1967 and county captain from 1972. He led England to three successive draws, starting in the second Test at Lord's. Snow finished the series with 11 wickets (32.27), the most by an England player.

==== West Indies, 1976 ====
There was no England tour in 1975–76 and Snow toured Rhodesia with the International Cavaliers, taking 4–36 and hitting 36 not out in the second match at Salisbury. The West Indies toured England in 1976, and their captain Clive Lloyd took offence at Greig's claim that he would make them "grovel". The West Indies won the series 3–0 in Lloyd's first great series victory. Viv Richards scored an outstanding 829 runs (118.32) including three centuries, but Snow still managed a haul of 15 wickets (28.20). Only Underwood took more wickets for England – 17 wickets (37.11) – and only Willis averaged less – 7 wickets (26.00).

Snow was punished in the first innings at Trent Bridge (1/123), but fought back in the second (4/53) with the wickets of Roy Fredericks, Richards, Lloyd and Bernard Julien. With England seeking a draw, Snow slowed down the game by stuffing bread-crumbs in his pocket during lunch and scattering them over the wicket. Umpire Dickie Bird had to use his cap to scare away the pigeons that kept flying down to eat them. Veterans Edrich and Close grimly held out for a draw against fast, short-pitched bowling.

Snow struck again at Lord's with 4/68 as he and Underwood (5/39) bowled the tourists out for 182 in their first innings. The match ended in a draw with West Indies on 241/6, needing 332 to win. Snow was dropped for the third Test at Old Trafford, which England lost by 425 runs, but was recalled for his final Test at Headingley. Here he reduced the West Indians from 413/5 to 450 all out with 4/77, including his 200th Test wicket, Andy Roberts. Snow took 2/82 in the second innings but England lost by 55 runs.

==== World series cricket ====
Snow still had a formidable reputation in Australia and was recruited by Tony Greig for World Series Cricket, which was about to be launched by Kerry Packer. The secret came out at a party held by Greig during the rain affected Sussex v Australians match in 1977 and there was widespread condemnation by the press and cricketing authorities. Before the start of the 1978 season, Snow and Greig had their Sussex contracts cancelled. They successfully went to court with Mike Procter when the Test and County Cricket Board (TCCB) tried to ban them from first-class cricket.

Snow did not play in any of the "Supertests", but was a regular for the World XI and WSC Cavaliers in the one-day games, hitting 42 and taking 3/30 to help win the final against Australia at Canberra in 1977–78.

=== Retirement ===
After World Series, at the age of 38, Snow returned to English cricket in 1980 and played in one Gillette Cup and six Sunday League matches for Warwickshire, taking a total of eight wickets (29.62) and scoring 57 runs (57.00). He then retired from cricket.

=== Bowling partners ===
Snow rarely had the same partner for more than a few matches. Peter Lever was a very effective new-ball partner in the 1970–71 Ashes series. Besides Lever, he teamed up with David Brown, Jeff Jones, Alan Ward, Chris Old, Ken Shuttleworth, Bob Willis, Geoff Arnold and others. His career overlapped with that of Willis through 1971 to 1976, but injuries and selection problems frequently prevented them from playing together.

=== Overbowling concerns ===
In 1967, Snow jarred his back while bowling against India in the Edgbaston Test. X-rays found that he had a sacroiliac joint abnormality which had become inflamed and that the only cure was traction and complete rest.

As a result, he became insistent that he must not be "overbowled", as he put it in his autobiography. He contended that he and his contemporaries Andy Roberts and Dennis Lillee all had their effectiveness reduced because of that. Snow himself usually bowled only fast-medium in run-of-the-mill county and tour games, saving his fastest pace for Test Matches and whenever the mood took him on the quick wickets at Hove. Snow said in a 2020 interview with The Hindu that mental preparation was important before a big match to stop the pressure taking its toll.

=== Other cricket views ===
Late in 1976, Snow caused controversy by wearing illegal advertising on his cricket clothing, and more when he published his autobiography Cricket Rebel, which was highly critical of the administration by Sussex and MCC. Snow called for better playing conditions, improved pay, four-day county matches and international umpires.

=== Helping other bowlers ===
Snow was generous in helping other bowlers. He coached Imran Khan, who was his teammate at Sussex, and remodelled his action so that he could bowl fast (a similar change to the one Snow had himself undergone). He also helped Dennis Lillee to bowl leg cutters.

== After cricket retirement ==
Snow set up a successful travel agency with the money he made from World Series. He was briefly a director of the Sussex cricket club.

== Poetry ==
Snow published two volumes of poetry: Contrasts, published in 1971 by Fuller d'Arch Smith Limited; and Moments and Thoughts published in 1973 by Kaye and Ward Limited. Snow said of one poem, Lord's Test, that he had penned in verse his "feelings and impressions about what it is like to play at the headquarters of world cricket". This was during the 1969 Lord's Test against West Indies, when Snow took 5/114 in the first innings. A television company heard of the poem and arranged to film him at Lord's during the first Test against New Zealand later that summer. They would then make a fifteen-minute programme about his poem with John Betjeman. However, this fell through after Snow was dropped from the England team.

== Personality ==
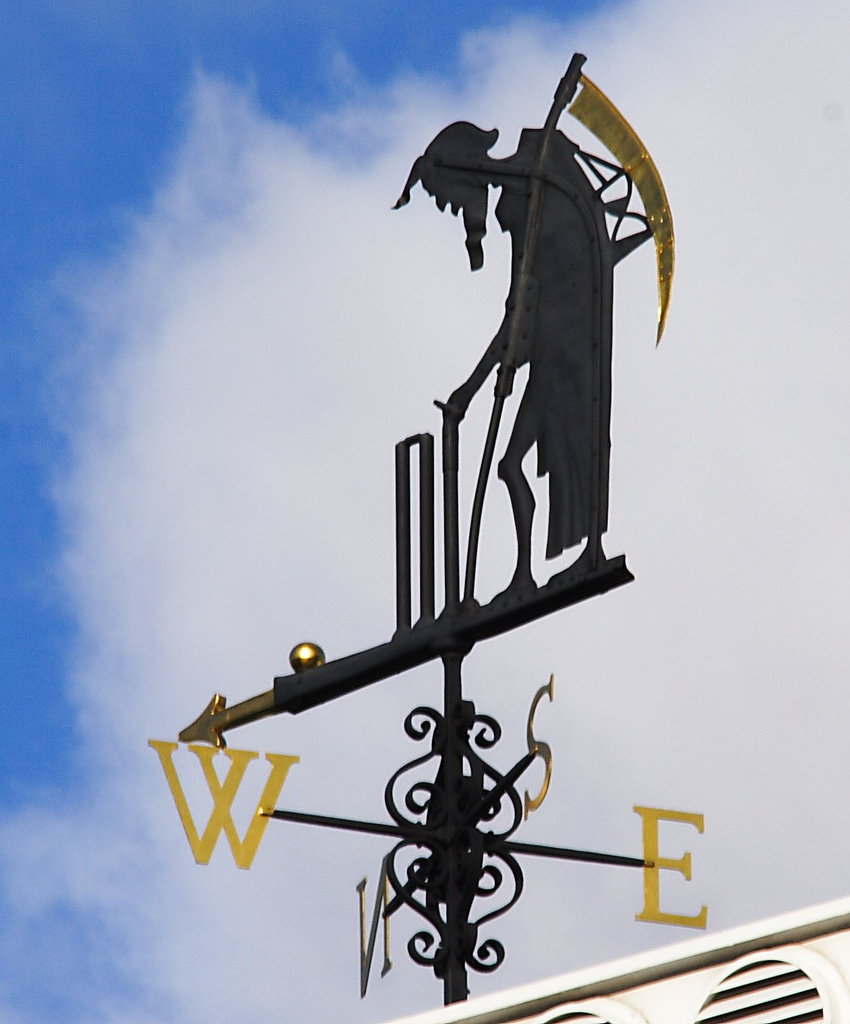
Later, spiritlike, While Father Time above the northern stand, Eyes the breeze, You move aside, And see a body flailing, Bowl a ball swinging, Along its way, batsman playing. From "Lord's Test", by John Snow.

Snow has agreed that he is an inward looking person but has said: "I do not withdraw from other players off the field or regard myself as a loner". Asked if he was 'a man of moods', Snow said: "Yes, I suppose to a certain extent I am..... I get fed up and down in the mouth some days, but if I give the impression of being in a bad temper it is more often than not with myself".

Snow was active in reading, music, painting, and poetry. In July 1971, at the England team's Harrogate hotel during the fourth Test at Headingley, Basil d'Oliveira in an animated dinner table conversation said to Snow: "The ultimate thing in life is to play for England". Snow replied quietly: "The ultimate thing in life is death".

== Personal life ==
Snow married Jenny Matthews in 1976. He said in his autobiography that they had known each other for many years, but they had delayed marriage because "the wife of a regular Test cricketer has a pretty rough time" when her husband is away touring and playing.

== In popular culture ==
John Snow is mentioned in a verse of the Roy Harper song When an Old Cricketer Leaves the Crease from the album HQ (1975) though the album was renamed after the song for its release in the United States. The song uses the sport of cricket as a metaphor for death and mentions Snow alongside another England cricketer from the time, Geoffrey Boycott, both by first name only in the line: "And it could be Geoff and it could be John". The song is dedicated to them both.

== Bibliography ==
=== Biographical ===
- Snow, John (1976). Cricket Rebel: An Autobiography. Hamlyn.

=== Annual reviews ===
- Playfair Cricket Annual. London: Playfair Books Ltd. 1962–1981.
- Wisden Cricketers' Almanack. London: John Wisden & Co. Ltd. 1962–1981.

=== Miscellaneous ===
- Arnold, Peter (1985). The Illustrated Encyclopaedia of World of Cricket. W. H. Smith.
- Bird, Dickie (1997). My Autobiography. Hodder & Stoughton.
- Birley, Derek (1999). A Social History of English Cricket. Aurum.
- Brown, Ashley (1988). A Pictorial History of Cricket. Bison Books.
- Freddi, Criss (1996). The Guinness Book of Cricket Blunders. Guinness Publishing.
- Frith, David (1987). Pageant of Cricket. Macmillan Company of Australia.
- Rowan, Lou (1972). The Umpires Story with an Analysis of the Laws of Cricket. Jack Pollard.
- Swanton, E. W. (1977). Swanton in Australia with MCC, 1946–1975. Fontana.
- Swanton, E. W., ed. (1986). The Barclays World of Cricket. Collins.
