= Umesh Kulkarni =

Umesh Kulkarni may refer to:

- Umesh Kulkarni (cricketer) (born 1942), Indian cricketer
- Umesh Vinayak Kulkarni, Marathi film director
