= List of cricketers who have scored a double century and a century in the same Test match =

In cricket, a century is a score of 100 or more runs in a single innings by a batsman. Scores of more than 200 runs are still statistically counted as a century, although these scores are referred to as double century (200–299 runs). A century or a double century is regarded as a landmark score for batsmen and a player's number of centuries or double centuries are generally recorded in their career statistics. Test cricket, the longest version of the game, involves two innings per side in a match and scheduled to last for up to five days. An individual scoring a double century and a century in the two innings of a single Test match is considered a notable achievement by critics.

The feat has been accomplished by 10 players on 10 occasions, as of December 2025. Players from Australia have accomplished the feat three times, the most for any country. So far, no batter has scored a double hundred and hundred in a Test match more than once.

== History ==
The first player to score a double hundred and a hundred in the same Test match was Doug Walters from Australia, who scored 242 runs in the first innings and 103 runs in the third innings. He achieved the feat on 17 February 1969 at Sydney Cricket Ground, while playing against the West Indies during the fifth Test of the bilateral series.`The second player to reach the milestone was India's Sunil Gavaskar, who did it in April 1971 at Queen's Park Oval, against the West Indies. At the age of 21, he made scores of 124 and 220 in the first and third innings respectively, becoming the youngest player to set the record. With this, he also became the first player to have double centuries in all four innings in Tests. Lawrence Rowe was the first player to score a double century and a century in a single Test on his debut match, which he did against New Zealand in February 1972. His scores of 214 and 100* was also the first time that a player scored a double ton and a ton in the same match and remained not out in any one of the two innings. Graham Gooch has the highest aggregate in a match while scoring a double century and a century in both the innings; his combined tally of 456 runs in the match—333 in the first and 123 in the second innings—was entered into The Guinness Book of Records as "Most runs scored by a player in a Test match". He also became the first batter to score a triple century and a century in the same Test match, while playing against India in July 1990. Brian Lara’s scores of 221 and 130 against Sri Lanka in November 2001, is the first and only instance of a player achieving the landmark on a losing cause.

== Key ==
Key
Symbol	Meaning
Player	The batsman who scored the centuries
Inn1	Score made by batsman in the first innings of the match
Inn2	Score made by batsman in the second innings of the match
*	Batsman remained not out
Team	The team the batsman was representing
Opposition	The team the batsman was playing against
Venue	The cricket ground where the match was played
Date	Starting date of the Test match
Result	Result for the team for which the century was scored

== List ==
Cricketers who have scored a double century and a century in the same Test match
No.	Player	Inn1	Inn2	Team	Opposition	Test	Venue	Date	Result	Ref
1	Doug Walters	242	103	Australia	West Indies	5th	(Australia) Sydney Cricket Ground, Sydney	14 February 1969	Won	
2	Sunil Gavaskar	124	220	India	West Indies	5th	(Trinidad and Tobago) Queen's Park Oval, Port of Spain	13 April 1971	Drawn	
3	Lawrence Rowe	214	100*	West Indies	New Zealand	1st	(Jamaica) Sabina Park, Kingston	16 February 1972	Drawn	
4	Greg Chappell	247*	133	Australia	New Zealand	1st	(New Zealand) Basin Reserve, Wellington	1 March 1974	Drawn	
5	Graham Gooch	333	123	England	India	1st	(England) Lord's, London	26 July 1990	Won	
6	Brian Lara	221	130	West Indies	Sri Lanka	3rd	(Sri Lanka) Singhalese Sports Club Cricket Ground, Colombo	29 November 2001	Lost	
7	Kumar Sangakkara	319	105	Sri Lanka	Bangladesh	2nd	(Bangladesh) Zohur Ahmed Chowdhury Stadium, Chittagong	4 February 2014	Drawn	
8	Marnus Labuschagne	204	104*	Australia	West Indies	1st	(Australia) Perth Stadium, Perth	30 November 2022	Won	
9	Shubman Gill	269	161	India	England	2nd	(England) Edgbaston, Birmingham	3 July 2025	Won	
10	Devon Conway	227	100	New Zealand	West Indies	3rd	(New Zealand) Bay Oval, Mount Maunganui	18 December 2025	Won	
