= Brian Lara =

Trinidadian cricketer (born 1969)

Brian Lara TC, OCC
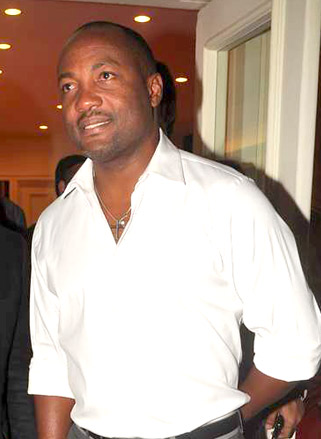
- Lara in 2012

Personal information
- Full name: Brian Charles Lara
- Born: 2 May 1969 (age 57); Santa Cruz, Trinidad and Tobago
- Height: 5 ft 8 in (173 cm)
- Batting: Left-handed
- Bowling: Right-arm leg break
- Role: Batsman

International information
- National side: West Indies (1990–2007)
- Test debut (cap 196): 6 December 1990 v Pakistan
- Last Test: 27 November 2006 v Pakistan
- ODI debut (cap 59): 9 November 1990 v Pakistan
- Last ODI: 21 April 2007 v England
- ODI shirt no.: 9

Domestic team information
- Years: Team
- 1987–2008: Trinidad and Tobago
- 1992/93: Northern Transvaal
- 1994–1998: Warwickshire
- 2010/11: Southern Rocks

Career statistics
Competition	Test	ODI	FC	LA
Matches	131	299	261	429
Runs scored	11,953	10,405	22,156	14,602
Batting average	52.88	40.48	51.88	39.67
100s/50s	34/48	19/63	65/88	27/86
Top score	400*	169	501*	169
Balls bowled	60	49	514	130
Wickets	–	4	4	5
Bowling average	–	15.25	104.00	29.80
5 wickets in innings	–	0	0	0
10 wickets in match	–	0	0	0
Best bowling	–	2/5	1/1	2/5
Catches/stumpings	164/–	120/–	320/–	177/–
Medal record
Men's Cricket
Representing West Indies
ICC Champions Trophy
Winner	2004 England
Runner-up	1998 Kenya
Runner-up	2006 India
- Source: ESPNcricinfo, 4 February 2012

Brian Charles Lara (born 2 May 1969) is a Trinidadian former international cricketer, widely renowned as one of the greatest batsmen of all time. He holds several cricketing records, including the record for the highest individual score in first-class cricket, with 501 not out for Warwickshire against Durham at Edgbaston in 1994, and the record for the highest individual score in an international Test innings, after scoring 400 not out at Antigua during the 4th test against England in 2004. He is nicknamed "The Prince of Port of Spain" or simply "The Prince".

Lara also held, for 18 years, the record of scoring the highest number of runs in a single over of a Test match when he scored 28 runs off an over of Robin Peterson of South Africa in 2003, until his record was overtaken by Jasprit Bumrah in 2022. As captain, Lara led the West Indies team to win the 2004 ICC Champions Trophy, the first time the team won any major ICC trophy since winning the 1979 Cricket World Cup.

Lara topped the Test batting rankings on several occasions, and his match-winning performance of 153 not out against Australia in Bridgetown, Barbados in 1999 was rated by Wisden the second-best batting performance in the history of Test cricket, next only to the 270 runs scored by Sir Donald Bradman in The Ashes Test match of 1937. Muttiah Muralitharan has hailed Lara as his toughest opponent among all batsmen in the world.

Lara was awarded the Wisden Leading Cricketer in the World awards in 1994 and 1995 and is also one of only three cricketers to receive the BBC Overseas Sports Personality of the Year, the other two being Sir Garfield Sobers and Shane Warne. Brian Lara was appointed honorary member of the Order of Australia on 27 November 2009, and in September 2012 he was inducted to the ICC's Hall of Fame as a 2012–13 season inductee. In 2013, Lara received Honorary Life Membership of the MCC becoming the 31st West Indian to receive the honor.

== Early life ==
Brian is one of eleven siblings. His father Bunty and one of his older sisters Agnes Cyrus enrolled him in the local Harvard Coaching Clinic at the age of six for weekly coaching sessions on Sundays. As a result, Lara had a very early education in correct batting technique. Lara's first school was St. Joseph's Roman Catholic primary. He then went to San Juan Secondary School, which is located on Moreau Road, Lower Santa Cruz. A year later, at fourteen years old, he moved on to Fatima College where he started his development as a promising young player under cricket coach Harry Ramdass. Aged 14, he amassed 745 runs in the schoolboys' league, with an average of 126.16 per innings, which earned him selection for the Trinidad and Tobago national under-16 team. When he was 15 years old, he played in his first West Indian under-19 youth tournament and that same year, Lara represented West Indies in Under-19 cricket.

== Cricket career ==
=== Early first-class career ===
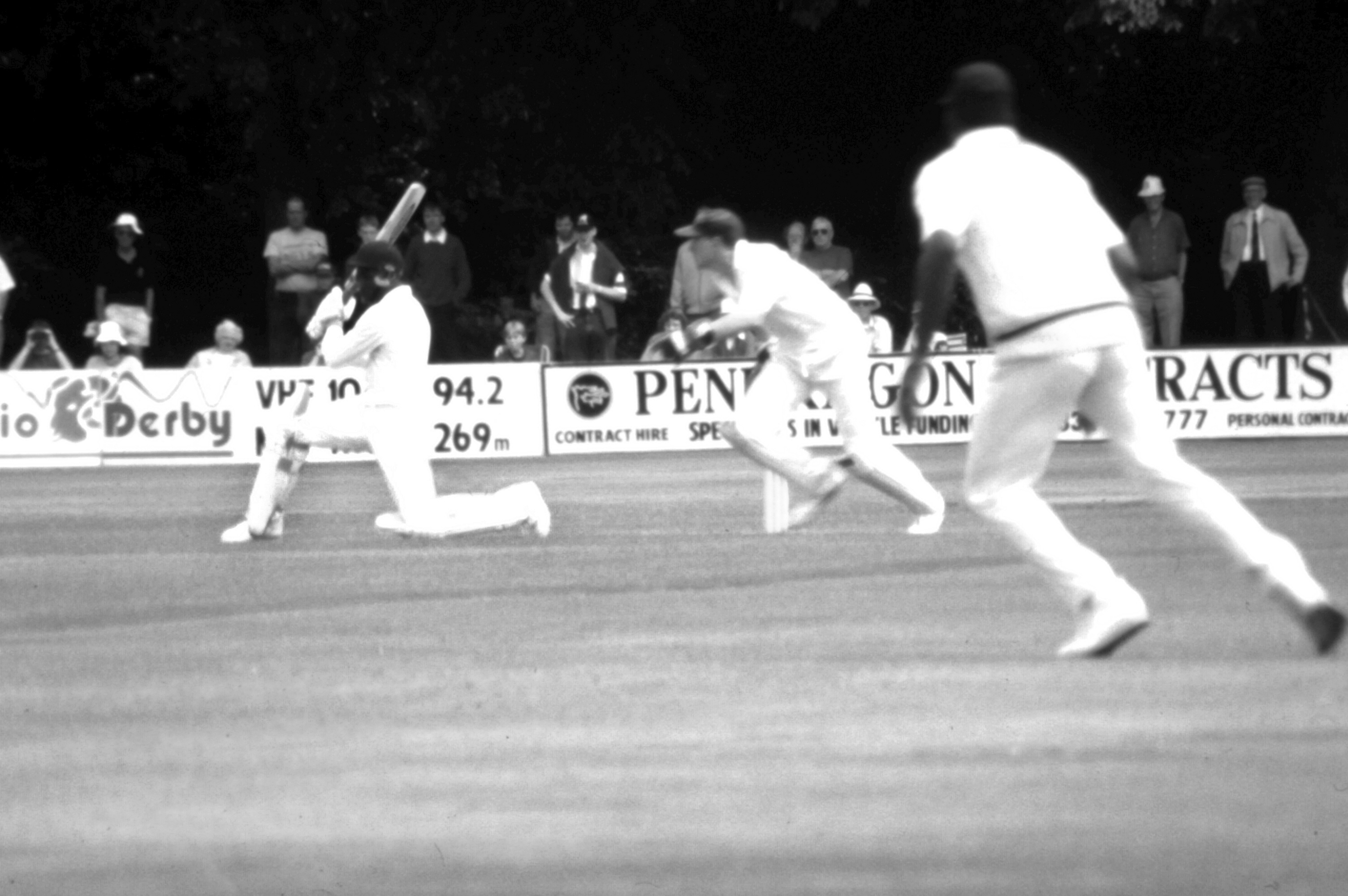
Lara batting for Warwickshire in 1994

1987 was a breakthrough year for Lara, when in the West Indies Youth Championships he scored 498 runs breaking the record of 480 by Carl Hooper set the previous year. He captained the tournament-winning Trinidad and Tobago, who profited from a match-winning 116 from Lara.

In January 1988, Lara made his first-class debut for Trinidad and Tobago in the Red Stripe Cup against Leeward Islands. In his second first-class match he made 92 against a Barbados attack containing Joel Garner and Malcolm Marshall, two greats of West Indies teams. Later in the same year, he captained the West Indies team in Australia for the Bicentennial Youth World Cup where the West Indies reached the semi-finals. Later that year, his innings of 182 as captain of the West Indies Under-23s against the touring Indian team further elevated his reputation.

His first selection for the full West Indies team followed in due course, but unfortunately coincided with the death of his father and Lara withdrew from the team. In 1989, he captained a West Indies B Team in Zimbabwe and scored 145.

In 1990, at the age of 20, Lara became Trinidad and Tobago's youngest-ever captain, leading them that season to victory in the one-day Geddes Grant Shield. It was also in 1990 that he made his belated Test debut for West Indies against Pakistan, scoring 44 and 5. He had made his ODI debut a month earlier against Pakistan, scoring 11.

=== International career ===
In January 1993, Lara scored 277 versus Australia in Sydney. This, his maiden Test century in his fifth Test, was the turning point of the series as West Indies won the final two Tests to win the series 2–1. Lara went on to name his daughter Sydney after scoring 277 at the SCG.

Lara holds several world records for high scoring. He has the highest individual score in both first-class cricket (501 not out for Warwickshire against Durham in 1994) and Test cricket (400 not out for the West Indies against England in 2004). Lara amassed his world record 501 in 474 minutes off only 427 balls. He hit 308 in boundaries (10 sixes and 62 fours). His partners were Roger Twose (115 partnership – 2nd wicket), Trevor Penney (314 – 3rd), Paul Smith (51 – 4th) and Keith Piper (322 unbroken – 5th). Earlier in that season Lara scored six centuries in seven innings while playing for Warwickshire.

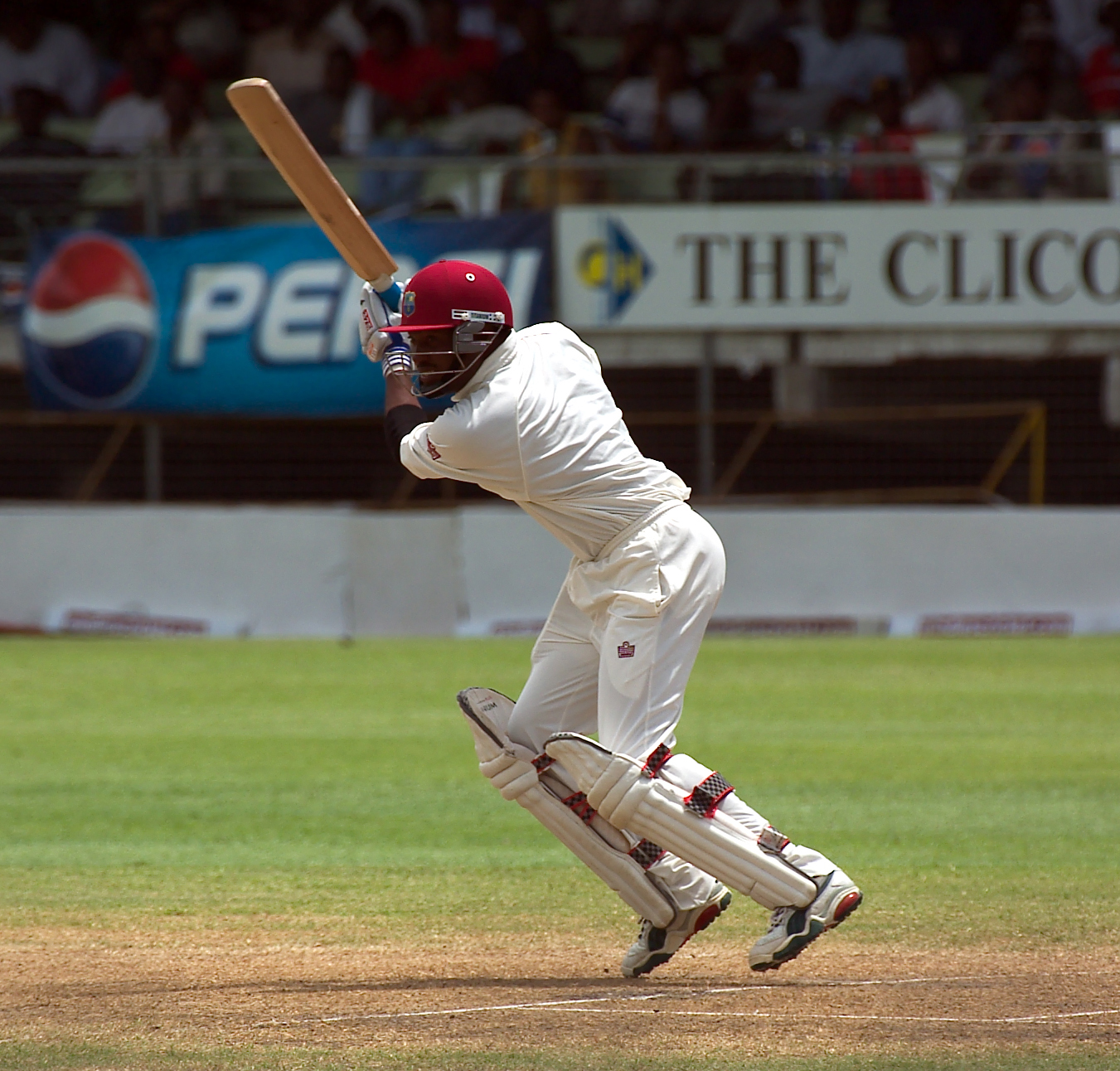
Brian Lara batting for the West Indies against India at Kensington Oval, Bridgetown, Barbados, in 2002

He is the only man to have reclaimed the Test record score, having scored 375 against England in 1994, a record that stood until Matthew Hayden's 380 against Zimbabwe in 2003. His 400 not out also made him the second player (after Donald Bradman) to score two Test triple-centuries, and the second (after Bill Ponsford) to score two first-class quadruple-centuries. He has scored nine double-centuries in Test cricket, third after Bradman's twelve and Kumar Sangakkara's eleven. As a captain, he scored five double-centuries, which is the highest by any one who is in charge. In 1995 Lara in the Test match away series against England, scored 3 centuries in three consecutive Matches which earned him the Man of the Series award. The Test Series was eventually drawn 2–2. He also held the record for the highest total number of runs in a Test career, after overtaking Allan Border in an innings of 226 played at Adelaide Oval, Australia in November 2005.

Lara captained the West Indies from 1998 to 1999, when West Indies suffered their first whitewash at the hands of South Africa. Following this they played Australia in a four-Test series which was drawn 2–2, with Lara scoring 546 runs including three centuries and one double hundred. In the second Test at Kingston he scored 213 while in the third Test he scored 153* in the second innings as West Indies chased down 311 with one wicket left. He won the Man of the Match award for both matches and was also named Man of the Series.

The Wisden 100 rates Lara's 153 not out against Australia in Bridgetown in 1998–99 as the second-best innings ever after Sir Donald Bradman's 270 against England in Melbourne in 1936–37.

In 2001 Lara was named the Man of the Carlton Series in Australia with an average of 46.50, the highest average by a West Indian in that series, scoring two half centuries and one century, 116 against Australia. That same year Lara amassed 688 runs in the three match away Test series against Sri Lanka making three centuries, and one fifty—including the double-century and a century in the first and second innings of the 3rd Test match at the Sinhalese Sports Ground, equating to 42% of the team's runs in that series. These extraordinary performances led Muttiah Muralitharan to state that Lara was the most dangerous batsman he had ever bowled to.

Lara was reappointed as captain against the touring Australians in 2003, and struck 110 in his first Test match back in charge, showing a return to stellar performance. Later that season, under his captaincy, West Indies won the two match Test series against Sri Lanka 1–0 with Lara making a double-century in the First Test. In September 2004, West Indies won the 2004 ICC Champions Trophy in England under his captaincy. For his performances in 2004, he was named both in the World Test XI and ODI XI by ICC.

In March 2005, Lara declined selection for the West Indies team because of a dispute over his personal Cable & Wireless sponsorship deal, which clashed with the Cricket Board's main sponsor, Digicel. Six other players were involved in this dispute, including stars Chris Gayle, Ramnaresh Sarwan and Dwayne Bravo. Lara said he declined selection in a stand of solidarity, when these players were dropped because of their sponsorship deals. The issue was resolved after the first Test of the series against the touring South African team.

Lara returned to the team for the second Test (and scored a huge first innings score of 196), but in the process lost his captaincy indefinitely to the newly appointed Shivnarine Chanderpaul. In the next Test, against the same opponents, he scored a 176 in the first innings. After a one-day series against South Africa, he scored his first Test century against the visiting Pakistanis in the first Test at Kensington Oval, Bridgetown, Barbados which the West Indies eventually won.

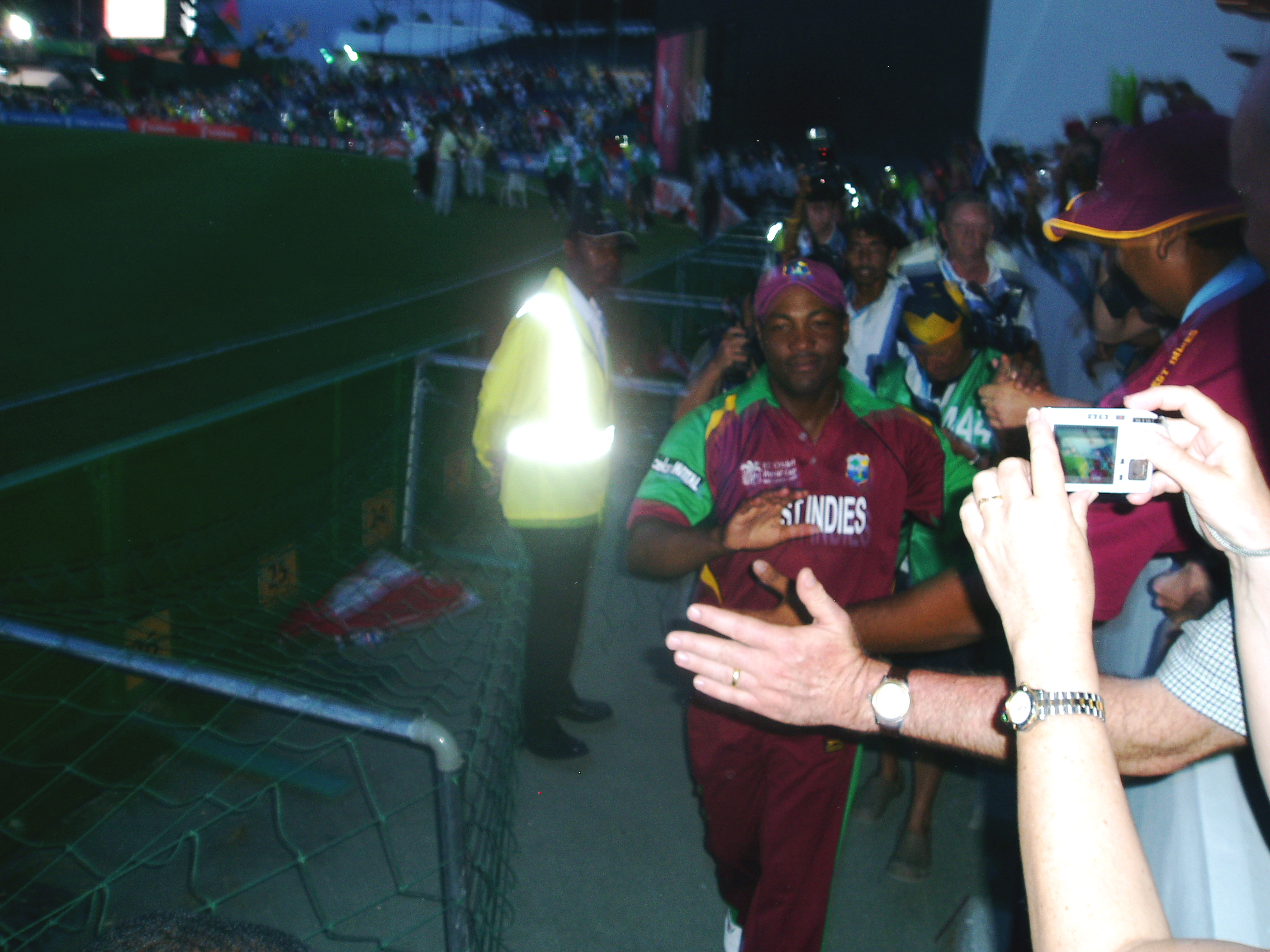
Lara during his lap of honour in his final international match, 2007 Cricket World Cup

For his performances in 2005, he was named in the World Test XI by ICC.

On 26 April 2006 Lara was reappointed the captain of the West Indies cricket team for the third time. This followed the resignation of Shivnarine Chanderpaul, who had been captain for thirteen months—in which the West Indies won just one of the 14 Test matches they had competed. In May 2006, Lara led the West Indies to successful One-Day series victories against Zimbabwe and India. Lara's team played Australia in the finals of the DLF Cup and the ICC Champions Trophy where they finished runners up in both finals.

On 16 December 2006 he became the first player for the West Indies to pass 10,000 One Day International runs, and, along with Sachin Tendulkar, one of only two players, at the time, to do so in both forms of the game. On 10 April 2007 Lara confirmed his retirement from one-day cricket post the 2007 Cricket World Cup. A few days later he announced that he would in fact be retiring from all international cricket after the tournament.

Lara played his final international game on 21 April 2007 in a dead rubber World Cup game against England. He was run out for 18 after a mix-up with Marlon Samuels; England won the game by 1 wicket. Before the end of this World Cup Glenn McGrath stated that Lara is the greatest batsman that he has ever bowled to.

=== Retirement ===
Lara's results in international matches
	Matches	Won	Lost	Drawn	Tied	No result
Test	131	32	63	36	0	–
ODI	299	139	144	–	3	13

On 19 April 2007 Lara announced his retirement from all forms of international cricket, indicating that the West Indies vs England match on 21 April 2007 would be his last international appearance. He was run out after a bad mixup with Marlon Samuels for 18, as England went on to win the match by one wicket.

He announced before the 2007 Cricket World Cup that this would be his last appearance in One Day Internationals. After his last match, in the post-game presentation interview, he asked the fans, "Did I entertain?", to which he received a resounding cheer from the crowd, after which he went out and took his 'lap of honour' where he met and shook hands with many of the fans. Lara stated this would be his last appearance in international cricket, he has also indicated his interest in retaining some involvement in the sport.

On 23 July 2007 Lara agreed to sign for the Indian Cricket League. He is the former captain of the Mumbai Champs. He volunteered to play for his home team Trinidad and Tobago during the start of 2008 domestic season, after not playing for them for the previous two years. He made his comeback a memorable one with a match winning hundred over Guyana, followed by a dismissive undefeated half-century in the second innings, scored at over two runs per ball. In the third-round game (Trinidad and Tobago got a bye in the second round).

Lara suffered a fractured arm against the Leeward Islands in St Maarten on 19 January, which kept him out of the ICL season. He nevertheless affirmed his commitment to returning to Twenty20 cricket, and on 27 June 2010 appeared for the Marylebone Cricket Club match against a touring Pakistan team, scoring 37 from 32 balls.

In 2012, Lara became involved with the Bangladesh Premier League team Chittagong Kings as their brand ambassador.

On the occasion of bicentennial anniversary of Lord's ground he played for the team of MCC, under the leadership of Sachin Tendulkar against the Rest of World XI in a 50 over game. He went on to score a half century in an eventual win for the MCC.

=== 2010 return ===
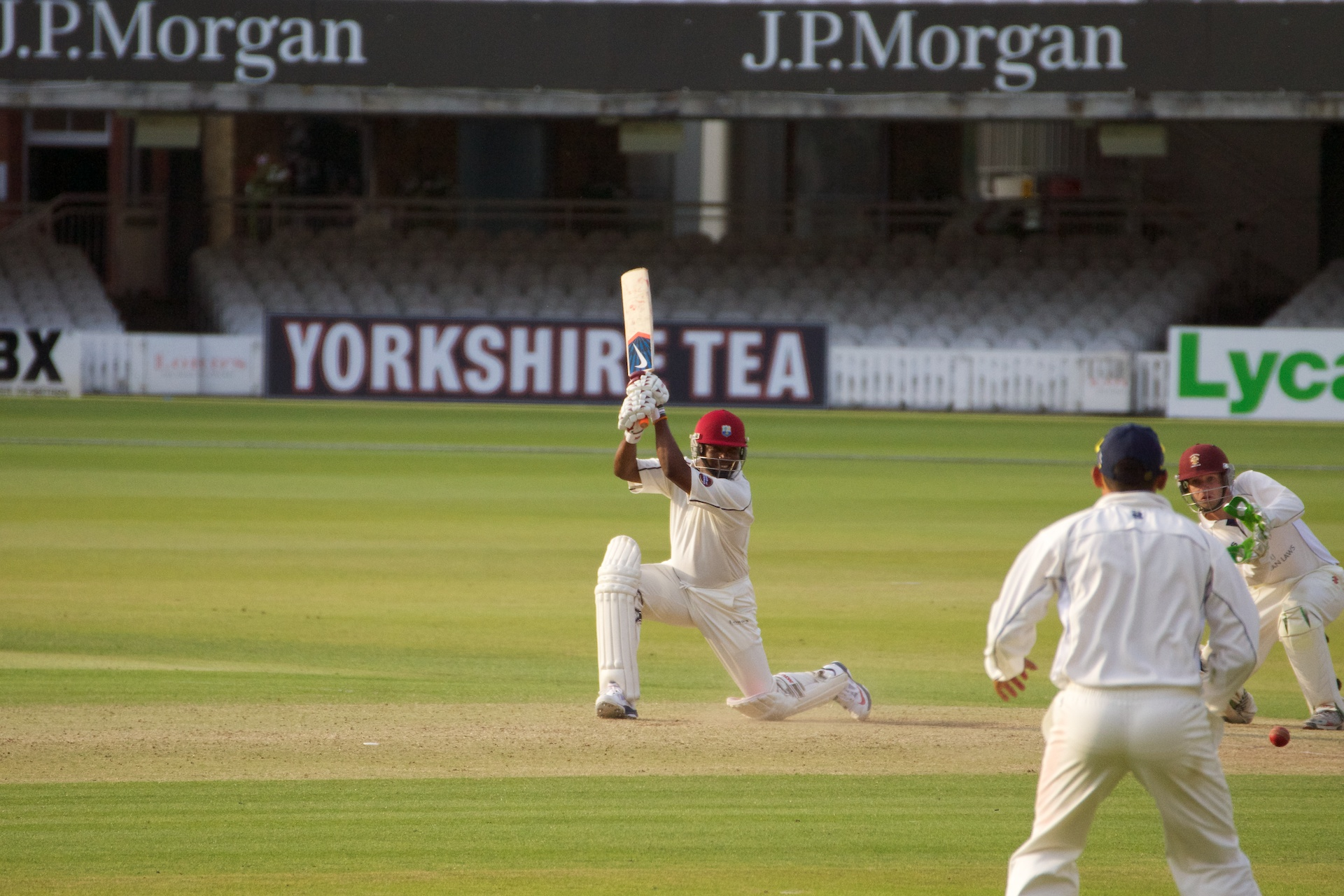
Brian Lara bats during a warm-up for the Bicentenary Celebration match in 2014

After negotiations between Surrey and Lara for the 2010 Friends Provident t20 failed to come to anything, Lara declared that he still wanted to sign a contract to play Twenty20 cricket. Late in the year he joined Southern Rocks, a Zimbabwean team, to compete in the 2010–11 Stanbic Bank 20 Series. On his debut for the Rocks, and his first-ever Twenty20 match, he scored a half-century, top-scoring for the Rocks with 65. He added 34 runs in his next two innings, but then left the competition, citing "commitments elsewhere".

After expressing his interest to play in the 2011 fourth edition of the Indian Premier League (IPL), and despite not having played active cricket for four years, Brian Lara still managed to attract the highest reserve price of $400,000 ahead of the IPL players' auction in early January 2011; however, no franchise bought him.

In July 2014, he played for the MCC team in the Bicentenary Celebration match at Lord's.

On 18 November 2016, Brian Lara signed with Newcastle C&S D5's team The Bennett Hotel Centurions.

=== Coaching ===
In December 2021 Brian Lara was appointed as Batting Coach and Strategic Advisor of the Sunrisers Hyderabad team for the 2022 season of the Indian Premier League.

== Personal life ==
Lara's father died in 1989 of a heart attack. His mother died in 2002 of cancer.

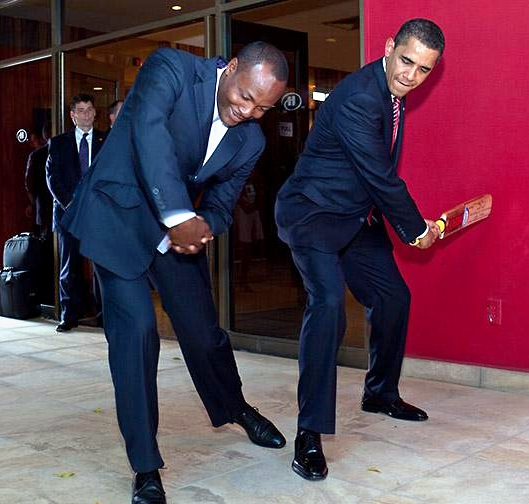
Barack Obama and Lara during the US President's tour of Trinidad and Tobago in 2009. Obama had asked to meet Lara, whom he described as the "Michael Jordan of cricket".

Lara has two daughters with Trinidadian journalist and model Leasel Rovedas. Lara has dated former British lingerie model Lynnsey Ward.

== Honours ==
In 2009, Lara was made an honorary Member of the Order of Australia (AM) for services to West Indian and Australian cricket.

Lara was one of four persons to receive the highest award of the Caribbean Community (Caricom) in July. Lara received an honorary doctorate from the University of Sheffield on Wednesday 10 January 2007. The ceremony took place at the Trinidad Hilton, Port of Spain, Trinidad and Tobago.

In September 2009, Lara was inducted as an honorary lifetime member of the Royal St. Kitts Golf Club.

On 29 October 2011 Lara was conferred with an honorary doctorate of laws by the University of the West Indies, St Augustine.

On 14 September 2012 he was inducted to the ICC's Hall of Fame at the awards ceremony held in Colombo, Sri Lanka as a 2012–13 season inductee.

The Brian Lara Stadium, in Trinidad and Tobago, opened in 2017, was named in his honour.

On 4 July 2019 Lara was bestowed with an honorary doctorate by the D Y Patil International University of India.

== Philanthropy ==
Lara has established the Pearl and Bunty Lara Foundation, which is a charitable organisation in memory of his parents that aims to address health and social care issues. He is an Ambassador for Sport of the Republic of Trinidad and Tobago, and travels on a diplomatic passport to promote his country throughout the world.

On 7 September 2008 he took part in Soccer Aid 2008, and on 6 June 2010 in Soccer Aid 2010, playing for the Rest of the World vs a team of England celebrities and ex-pros. Lara was also a talented football player in his youth and often played with his friends Dwight Yorke, Shaka Hislop and Russell Latapy while growing up together in Trinidad. Yorke, Hislop and Latapy would go on to play for Trinidad and Tobago at the 2006 FIFA World Cup.

== Records ==
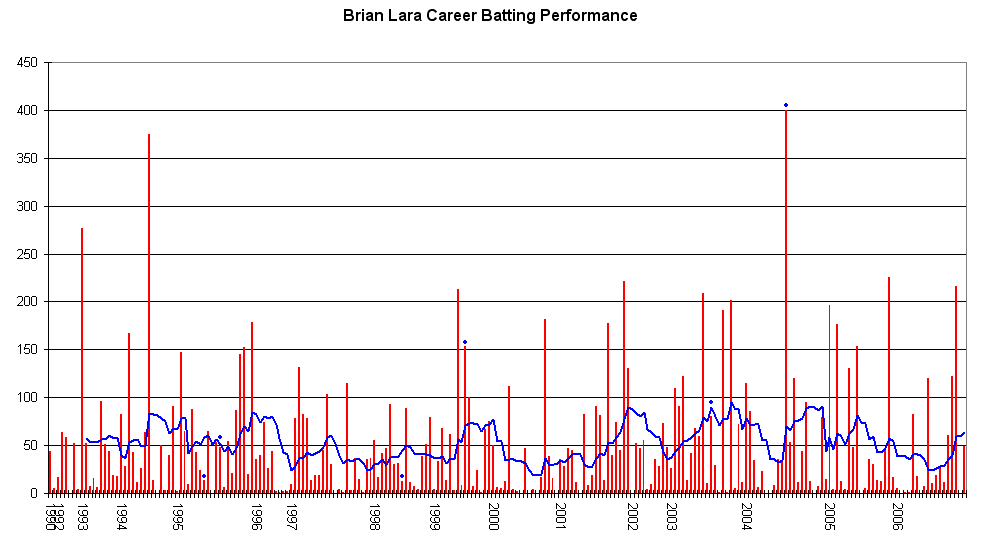
Brian Lara's career performance graph

- Lara struck 277 runs against Australia in Sydney, his maiden Test century, the fourth-highest maiden Test century by any batsman, the highest individual score in all Tests between the two teams and the fourth-highest century ever recorded against Australia by any Test batsman.
- He became the first man to score seven centuries in eight first-class innings, the first being the record 375 against England and the last being the record 501 not out against Durham.
- After Matthew Hayden had eclipsed his Test record for highest individual score 375 by five runs in 2003, he reclaimed the record scoring 400 not out in 2004 against England. With these innings he became the second player to score two Test triple-centuries, the first & only player to score two 350-plus scores in test history, the second player to score two career quadruple-centuries after Bill Ponsford, the only player to achieve both these milestones, and regained the distinction of being the holder of both the record first-class individual innings and the record Test individual innings. He is the only player to break the world record twice.
- He also set the record for the highest individual test score as captain (400*)
- In the same innings, he became the second batsman to score 1,000 Test runs in five different years, four days after Matthew Hayden first set the record.
- He was the all-time leading run scorer in Test cricket, a record he attained on 26 November 2005 until surpassed by Sachin Tendulkar on 17 October 2008.
- He was the fastest batsman to score 10,000 (with Sachin Tendulkar) and 11,000 Test runs, in terms of number of innings.
- He scored 34 Test centuries; joint-sixth along with Sunil Gavaskar, Mahela Jayawardene and Younis Khan on the all-time list behind Sachin Tendulkar (51), Jacques Kallis (45), Ricky Ponting (41), Kumar Sangakkara (38) and Rahul Dravid (36).
  - He has the most centuries for a West Indian
  - Nine of his centuries are double-centuries (surpassed only by Kumar Sangakkara and Donald Bradman)
  - Two of them are triple-centuries (matched by Australia's Donald Bradman, India's Virender Sehwag, and West Indies' Chris Gayle).
  - He has scored centuries against all Test-playing nations. He achieved this feat in 2005 by scoring his first Test century against Pakistan at the Kensington Oval in Bridgetown, Barbados.
- He became the sixth batsman to score a century in one session, doing so against Pakistan on 21 November 2006.
- Lara has scored 20% of his team runs, a feat surpassed only by Bradman (23%) and George Headley (21%). Lara scored 688 runs (42% of team output, a record for a series of three or more Tests, and the second-highest aggregate runs in history for a three-Test series) in the 2001–02 tour of Sri Lanka.
- He also scored a century and a double-century in the third Test in that same Sri Lanka tour, a feat repeated only five other times in Test cricket history.
- He has scored the most runs (351) on a losing team in a Test.
- He scored the largest proportion (53.83%) of his team's total runs in a Test when he made 221 and 130 against Sri Lanka at Colombo in 2001. The previous Test record stood at 51.88% and was achieved by Jimmy Sinclair.
- Lara holds the world record of scoring most runs in a single over (28 runs against left-arm spinner RJ Peterson of South Africa) in Test cricket. He also scored 26 runs in a single over off the bowling of Danish Kaneria at Multan Cricket Stadium on 21 November 2006.
- He scored the ninth-fastest Test century, doing so off 77 balls against Pakistan on 21 November 2006.
- With 164 catches, he is the eighth-highest all-time catch-taker of non-wicketkeepers, behind Rahul Dravid, Mahela Jayawardene, Jacques Kallis, Ricky Ponting, Mark Waugh, Stephen Fleming and Graeme Smith.
- In 1994, he was awarded the BBC Sports Personality of the Year Overseas Personality Award. In 1995, he was chosen as one of the Wisden Cricketers of the Year.
- Lara had played some of his best innings in the latter stage of his career. Wisden published a top 100 list in July 2001, a distillation of the best performances from 1,552 Tests, 54,494 innings and 29,730 bowling performances. Three innings by Lara were placed in the top 15 (the most for any batsman in that range). His 153 not out in Bridgetown, Barbados, during West Indies' 2–2 home series draw against Australia in *1998–1999 was deemed the second-greatest Test innings ever played, behind Bradman's 270 against England in the Third Test of the 1936–1937 series at Melbourne.
- He was voted as second-scariest batsman to face in the "World's Scariest Batsman" poll of international bowlers.

== See also ==
- Brian Lara Cricket series of video games
- Brian Lara Cricket Academy

== Notes and references ==
Sporting positions
Preceded by Courtney Walsh	West Indies Test cricket captains 1996/97–1999/2000	Succeeded by Jimmy Adams
Preceded by Carl Hooper	West Indies Test cricket captains 2002/2003–2004	Succeeded by Shivnarine Chanderpaul
Preceded by Shivnarine Chanderpaul	West Indies Test cricket captains 2006–2007	Succeeded by Ramnaresh Sarwan
Awards and achievements
Preceded by Garfield Sobers	World Record – Highest individual score in Test cricket 375 vs England at St John's 1993–94	Succeeded by Matthew Hayden
Preceded by Matthew Hayden	World Record – Highest individual score in Test cricket 400 not out vs England at St John's 2003–04	Current holder
Preceded by Hanif Mohammad	Highest individual score in first-class cricket 501 not out Warwickshire v Durham at Birmingham 1994	Current holder
