= Barry Jarman =

Australian cricketer (1936–2020)

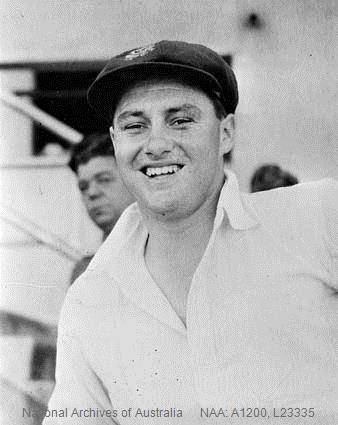
- Jarman in 1957

Personal information
- Full name: Barrington Noel Jarman
- Born: 17 February 1936; Hindmarsh, South Australia
- Died: 17 July 2020 (aged 84); Adelaide, South Australia
- Height: 1.74 m (5 ft 9 in)
- Batting: Right-handed
- Role: Wicket-keeper

International information
- National side: Australia (1959–1969)
- Test debut (cap 215): 19 December 1959 v India
- Last Test: 24 January 1969 v West Indies

Domestic team information
- Years: Team
- 1955/56–1968/69: South Australia

Career statistics
Competition	Test	First-class
Matches	19	191
Runs scored	400	5,615
Batting average	14.81	22.73
100s/50s	0/2	5/26
Top score	78	196
Balls bowled	–	167
Wickets	–	3
Bowling average	–	32.66
5 wickets in innings	–	0
10 wickets in match	–	0
Best bowling	–	1/17
Catches/stumpings	50/4	431/129
- Source: CricInfo, 19 July 2020

Barrington Noel Jarman OAM (17 February 1936 – 17 July 2020) was an Australian Test cricketer and International Cricket Council (ICC) match referee. Jarman played in 19 Test matches for the Australian cricket team between 1959 and 1969, including one match as captain.

== Early life ==
Jarman was born in Hindmarsh, South Australia, and later attended the Thebarton Technical High School. He played club cricket for Woodville Cricket Club in South Australian district cricket. After playing in the club's schoolboy team as an 11-year-old in 1948, Jarman began playing senior cricket during the 1949/50 season and made his A-Grade debut in 1952 at the age of 15.

While playing Australian rules football for West Torrens Football Club Colts in the South Australian National Football League (SANFL) junior competition, Jarman broke his leg which led him to focus on cricket.

== Career ==
On his first-class cricket debut for South Australia against New South Wales at the Adelaide Oval in December 1955, Jarman scored 14 and nine runs and took three catches. Fourteen months and seven first-class matches later he was selected in the Australian team touring New Zealand, where he played in the unofficial Test series. Jarman was then selected as one of two wicket-keepers for the 1957–58 tour of South Africa, but was overlooked in favour of Wally Grout, who then became Australia's first choice wicket-keeper.

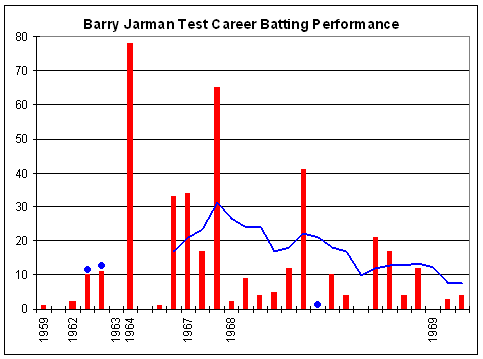
Barry Jarman's Test career batting graph.

Jarman made his Test debut, in the absence of an injured Grout, in December 1959 against India at Green Park Stadium, Kanpur during Australia's tour of India, making one and a duck and taking two catches. Grout recovered and Jarman again became reserve keeper, touring England in 1961 without playing a Test.

A broken jaw to Grout led to Jarman's return to Test cricket, against England at Brisbane in the First Test of the 1962-63 Ashes series. He made two runs, took three catches and held his spot until Grout returned for the Fourth Test.

Jarman next returned to Test cricket during the 1964–65 tour of India, where he made his highest Test score of 78 at Brabourne Stadium, Mumbai. Following Grout's retirement in 1966, Jarman became the first-choice wicket-keeper, playing in series against India, England and West Indies. He was appointed vice-captain of the Australian side for the 1968 tour of England and, following a finger injury to captain Bill Lawry, Jarman captained Australia in the Headingley Test. Needing only to draw the match, Australia "concentrated solely on avoiding defeat". The match was drawn and Australia retained the Ashes.

Jarman retired from cricket at the end of the 1968–69 series against the touring West Indies, having played 19 Tests, scoring 400 runs at an average of 14.81 runs per innings and taking 50 catches and four stumpings. In first-class cricket, he scored 5,615 runs at an average of 22.73 and took 431 catches and 129 stumpings in 191 matches, a wicket-keeping record bettered at the time among Australians only by Grout and Bert Oldfield.

== Later life ==
Following his retirement from first-class cricket, Jarman became involved in horse racing and cricket administration, eventually leading to his 1995 appointment as one of the first ICC match referees, a role overseeing players and officials during international games. He was a referee in 53 matches at Test and One Day International level between 1995 and 2001.

In 1997 he was awarded the Medal of the Order of Australia "for service to sport as a cricket player, coach and international cricket referee, and to horseracing in South Australia". The main grandstand at the Woodville Oval in Adelaide, home of the Woodville Cricket Club, is named the Barry Jarman Stand in his honour.

Jarman was married to Gaynor and had four children. He died on 17 July 2020, aged 84.

Preceded by Bill Lawry	Australian Test cricket captains 1968	Succeeded by Bill Lawry
