= David Renneberg =

Australian cricketer (1942–2025)

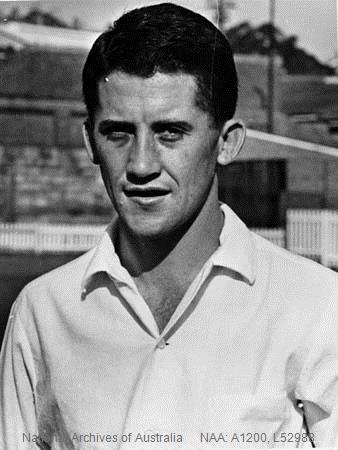

Personal information
- Full name: David Alexander Renneberg
- Born: 23 September 1942; Paddington, New South Wales, Australia
- Died: 7 April 2025 (aged 82); Katoomba, New South Wales, Australia
- Height: 1.93 m (6 ft 4 in)
- Batting: Right-handed
- Bowling: Right-arm fast

International information
- National side: Australia (1966–1968)
- Test debut (cap 239): 23 December 1966 v South Africa
- Last Test: 19 January 1968 v India

Career statistics
Competition	Test	FC	LA
Matches	8	90	3
Runs scored	22	466	14
Batting average	3.66	7.06	14.00
100s/50s	0/0	0/0	0/0
Top score	9	26	10*
Balls bowled	1,598	17,030	167
Wickets	23	291	3
Bowling average	36.08	29.30	25.00
5 wickets in innings	2	13	0
10 wickets in match	0	1	0
Best bowling	5/39	8/72	1/19
Catches/stumpings	2/–	35/–	0/–
- Source: Cricinfo, 3 June 2025

David Alexander Renneberg (23 September 1942 – 7 April 2025) was an Australian cricketer who played in eight Test matches from 1966 to 1968.

Born to parents of German ancestry, Renneberg was a tall fast bowler who played for New South Wales from 1964–65 to 1970–71. He toured South Africa in 1966–67 and England in 1968 with the Australian Test team. He played a season for Rawtenstall in the Lancashire League in 1969.

Renneberg's best first-class bowling figures were 8 for 72 against Essex on the 1968 tour. His best Test figures were 5 for 39 against India in the First Test of the 1967–68 series in Australia. He had taken his best Sheffield Shield figures of 7 for 33 against Queensland a month earlier.

Renneberg retired after 1970–71 season. He provided comments on ABC radio cricket broadcasts in Sydney from 1974 to 1986.

He died on 7 April 2025 at the age of 82.
