= Les Joslin =

Australian cricketer

Personal information
- Full name: Leslie Ronald Joslin
- Born: 13 December 1947 (age 78); Yarraville, Melbourne, Australia
- Batting: Left-handed
- Bowling: Left-arm medium

International information
- National side: Australia
- Only Test (cap 245): 26 January 1968 v India

Career statistics
Competition	Test	FC	LA
Matches	1	44	3
Runs scored	9	1,816	63
Batting average	4.50	29.77	31.50
100s/50s	0/0	2/12	0/0
Top score	7	126	29
Balls bowled	0	136	–
Wickets	–	1	–
Bowling average	–	73.00	–
5 wickets in innings	–	0	–
10 wickets in match	–	0	–
Best bowling	–	1/14	–
Catches/stumpings	0/–	27/–	1/–
- Source: Cricinfo, 19 September 2019

Leslie Ronald Joslin (born 13 December 1947) is a former Australian cricketer who played in one Test match in 1968.

== Life and career ==
A hard-hitting left-handed middle-order batsman, Joslin was a champion schoolboy cricketer at University High School, Melbourne. In 1966–67, his first season for Victoria, he made 525 runs at an average of 43.75, helping Victoria win the Sheffield Shield. He hit his first first-class century, 126, against Western Australia while he was still only 18, adding 107 for the fourth wicket with his captain, Jack Potter. His other century, 121 not out, came in 1967–68, when he and Potter added 177 for the fourth wicket in 130 minutes against New South Wales. He was included in the team for the Fourth Test against India in Sydney, but made only 7 and 2, dismissed both times by the Indian spinners.

Joslin finished the 1967–68 season with 565 runs at 51.36, and was selected to tour England in 1968. In 13 first-class matches on the tour he made only 344 runs at 21.50, and was never in the running for a Test spot. On his return to Australia he played the 1968–69 season and most of the 1969–70 season, but never regained his earlier form and lost his place in the Victorian side, having played his last first-class match not long after turning 22.

Joslin played eight seasons of district cricket for Footscray from 1964–65 to 1971–72, averaging 30.6 with the bat. Through lower level cricket in the mid-1970s he developed into an all-rounder, and returned to district cricket for a single season with Fitzroy in 1977–78, when he averaged 39.6 with the bat and took 25 wickets at 18.5. He was also an Australian rules footballer in the Victorian Football Association, playing with Yarraville in the early 1970s, and coaching Werribee in 1978 and 1979. Outside sport, Joslin worked in the tobacco industry, and then for a stud-breeding operation in harness-racing.
