= David J. Brown (cricketer) =

English cricketer (born 1942)

David Brown
Personal information
- Full name: David John Brown
- Born: 30 January 1942 (age 84); Walsall, Staffordshire, England
- Batting: Right-handed
- Bowling: Right-arm fast-medium

International information
- National side: England
- Test debut (cap 429): 22 July 1965 v South Africa
- Last Test: 24 July 1969 v New Zealand

Career statistics
Competition	Test	First-class
Matches	26	390
Runs scored	342	4,110
Batting average	11.79	12.26
100s/50s	0/0	0/6
Top score	44*	79
Balls bowled	5,098	63,339
Wickets	79	1,165
Bowling average	28.31	24.85
5 wickets in innings	2	46
10 wickets in match	0	5
Best bowling	5/42	8/60
Catches/stumpings	7/–	157/–
- Source: CricInfo, 9 February 2020

David John Brown (born 30 January 1942) is an English former cricketer who played in twenty six Test matches between 1965 and 1969. Cricket writer Colin Batemen described Brown as a "rangy, popular paceman...[with] gutsy determination and uncomplaining effort".

== Life and career ==
Educated at Queen Mary's Grammar School, Brown made his Warwickshire debut in 1961. A dependable seam bowler in the English tradition, Brown used his full 6' 4" to extract bounce from any wicket, an attribute which enabled him to be as effective on hard wickets on tour as he was on green pitches at home. He overcame injury to take 1,165 first-class wickets and play regularly for England in the late 1960s, taking 79 wickets.

His most famous bowling was in the Third Test at Sydney in the 1965-66 Ashes series, where he took 5/63, forcing Australia to follow on, and England won their biggest victory down under for fifty years. This was despite being "laid low with bursitis, or a sort of house-maid's knee of the elbow" and he took only 11 wickets (37.18) in the drawn series.

He was a good close to the wicket fielder and famously held two crucial catches off the bowling of Derek Underwood as England snatched victory late on the final day of the last test match against Australia at the Oval in 1968, to square the series 1–1.

In the first half of 1969, Brown took fourteen wickets at 20 apiece as England easily accounted for the West Indies. An injury to Brown's opening bowling partner, John Snow, meant that Alan Ward was called up for the first Test against England's next opponents, New Zealand. When selection was made for the second test, and with Snow fit again, it was Brown that made way not Ward, and Brown did not play international cricket again.

His leadership skills were rewarded with the vice-captaincy on the MCC tour of Pakistan in 1966-67, and the captaincy of Warwickshire from 1975 to 1977. In 1982, in answer to an injury crisis, he returned to the fray at the age of 40, long after he had retired to farm and breed racehorses, and thus played in 390 first-class matches in all. It was in this latter capacity that Brown became the first substitute ever to take a wicket in county cricket. After his colleague, Gladstone Small, had been called up for Test duties on the morning of the second day of Warwickshire's County Championship game against Lancashire, at Southport, revised playing conditions allowed Brown to act as a full substitute.

Brown's best bowling figures in Test and first-class cricket were both achieved at Lord's. In 1968 he took 5 for 42 against Australia, and in 1975 he took 8 for 60 against Middlesex. His highest Test score of 44 not out was made at Lahore in February 1969. His highest first-class score of 79 came against Derbyshire at Edgbaston in 1972.

Brown established the Furnace Mill Stud farm at Kidderminster in 1976 to breed racehorses. Amongst the horses bred at Furnace Mill is Bolshoi, winner of the King's Stand Stakes in 1998. In 2019 Brown was awarded the Andrew Devonshire Award for outstanding contribution to the racehorse breeding industry by the Thoroughbred Breeders' Association. His daughter, Emily Brown, became a successful jockey in Australia.
