= Albert Warner (umpire) =

South African cricket umpire

Personal information
- Full name: Albert Jack Warner
- Born: 5 July 1921; Ombersley, Worcestershire, England

Umpiring information
- Tests umpired: 2 (1970)
- Source: Cricinfo, 17 July 2013

Albert Warner (born 5 July 1921) was a South African former cricket umpire. He stood in two Test matches, both South Africa vs. Australia, in 1970.

== See also ==
- List of Test cricket umpires
