= Doug Walters =

Australian cricketer

Doug Walters AM MBE
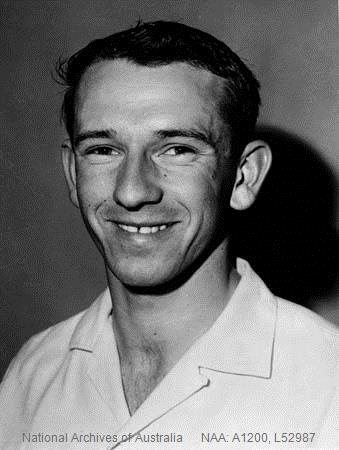
- Walters in 1965

Personal information
- Full name: Kevin Douglas Walters
- Born: 21 December 1945 (age 80); Dungog, New South Wales, Australia
- Batting: Right-handed
- Bowling: Right-arm medium
- Role: Batsman

International information
- National side: Australia
- Test debut (cap 237): 10 December 1965 v England
- Last Test: 7 February 1981 v India
- ODI debut (cap 11): 5 January 1971 v England
- Last ODI: 3 February 1981 v New Zealand

Domestic team information
- Years: Team
- 1962/63–1980/81: New South Wales

Career statistics
| Competition | Test | ODI | FC | LA |
|---|---|---|---|---|
| Matches | 74 | 28 | 258 | 49 |
| Runs scored | 5,357 | 513 | 16,180 | 940 |
| Batting average | 48.26 | 28.50 | 43.84 | 32.41 |
| 100s/50s | 15/33 | 0/2 | 45/81 | 0/7 |
| Top score | 250 | 59 | 253 | 71 |
| Balls bowled | 3,295 | 314 | 14,576 | 1,107 |
| Wickets | 49 | 4 | 190 | 29 |
| Bowling average | 29.08 | 68.25 | 35.69 | 28.44 |
| 5 wickets in innings | 1 | 0 | 6 | 0 |
| 10 wickets in match | 0 | 0 | 0 | 0 |
| Best bowling | 5/66 | 2/24 | 7/63 | 4/28 |
| Catches/stumpings | 43/– | 10/– | 149/– | 17/– |
Medal record
Men's Cricket
Representing Australia
ICC Cricket World Cup
| Runner-up | 1975 England |
- Source: ESPNcricinfo, 20 November 2014

Kevin Douglas Walters AM MBE (born 21 December 1945) is a former Australian cricketer. He was known as an attacking batsman, a useful part-time bowler, and also as a typical ocker. He was a part of the Australian squad which finished as runners-up at the 1975 Cricket World Cup.

In 2011, he was inducted into the Cricket Hall of Fame by the CA.

== First-class career ==
Walters made his first-class debut for New South Wales against Queensland in the 1962–63 season. His highest score was 253 and his best bowling was 7/63, both against South Australia in the 1964–65 season. In the domestic Sheffield Shield competition he played 91 matches, scoring 5,602 runs at 39.73 and taking 110 wickets at 32.81.

Walters announced his retirement from all forms of cricket in October 1981.

He was not bothered at being heralded as "another Bradman" early in his career and held no grudges at being conscripted to the army in his youthful prime.

"Bradman was Bradman to me - it didn't matter what anyone else said", Walters said.

"I certainly didn't consider my self stepping into his shoes.

"As for my conscription into the army, I don't think it had any great effect on me - I was playing some of my best cricket as soon as I came out".

== Test cricket career ==
After Walters' innings I wrote that with one necessary qualification I thought he would be come to be rated as the best bat produced by Australia since Neil Harvey proclaimed himself with his famous hundred at Headingley in '48. The reservation concerned his ability against really fast bowling, as to which I had no evidence...Only Lawry and Simpson have made more runs and had records to compare if one is to make a quantitative judgement. At all events my contention is at least arguable. Doug has made eleven hundreds for Australia, some of extreme brilliance, and if he ever played a dull innings I never saw it.

E.W. Swanton

Walters made his debut in Test cricket on 10 December 1965 at the Gabba against England in the 1965–66 Ashes series and quickly developed a reputation as a batsman who could 'make things happen' with a moment of brilliance on an important occasion. He scored 155 in his first Test innings and another century in his second Test. He was not at his best in the subsequent tour of England, averaging only 25.68 in 18 matches there, but elsewhere he was a quick-scoring batsman. Walters was denied an opportunity to tour South Africa in 1966-67 when he was conscripted to two years of National Service training, although effectively being exempted from Vietnam service in order to pursue his professional, cricketing career in Australia, and it wasn't until 1968 that he returned to the test arena. In the 1968-69 series against the West Indies, Walters was injured and unavailable for the first Test match, but in the remaining four Tests he scored a Bradman-like 699 runs, at an average of 116.5, with a highest score of 242 (in the process he became the first player to score a century and a double century in a single Test). In 1969–70 he showed a weakness against the South African fast bowlers Peter Pollock and Mike Procter, ducking while leaving his bat upright like a submarine periscope. This weakness was exploited by England's John Snow in the 1970-71 Ashes Series, who repeatedly sent down fast, short-pitched balls against Walters. Even so, Walters made 205 not out for New South Wales against the tourists, 112 in the First Test and three fifties thereafter, but few runs in between, making 373 runs (37.30) in the series. Walters starred in an unofficial Test series to a Rest of the World team led by Gary Sobers that toured in 1971–72 as a replacement for the politically unacceptable South Africans, scoring 355 runs in four matches at an average of 71.00, with two centuries. He famously hit a century in a session at the WACA against England in 1974, where he hit Bob Willis for six from the last ball of the day to bring up his ton. He missed the entire series when Australia beat West Indies 5–1 in Australia in 1975-76 due to an injury, but was soon back in the side. His 250 against New Zealand in 1977 is the highest by any batsman in the number six position. Walters was a part-time bowler, but his medium-paced "Golden Arm" broke many partnerships and yielded 49 Test wickets at 29.08. He wore the large sideburns popular in the 1960s and '70s and when not on the field was seldom seen without a cigarette hanging from the corner of his mouth. He was also famous for his laconic humour.

The Doug Walters Stand at the Sydney Cricket Ground (opened 1985, demolished 2007) was named after him. There is currently a bar in the Victor Trumper Stand named after him.

He was a Channel Nine cricket commentator in the 1987/88 season.

In 1988, he wrote One for the Road which is a combination of stories and anecdotes from his early and later cricketing days. He later co-wrote a book, The Entertainers, with Mark Waugh in 1999.

He currently resides in Sydney with his wife Caroline.

== Honours ==
On 14 June 1975, Walters was appointed Member of the Order of the British Empire for cricket.

In June 2022, Walters was appointed Member of the Order of Australia in the 2022 Queen's Birthday Honours for "significant service to cricket at the elite levels".

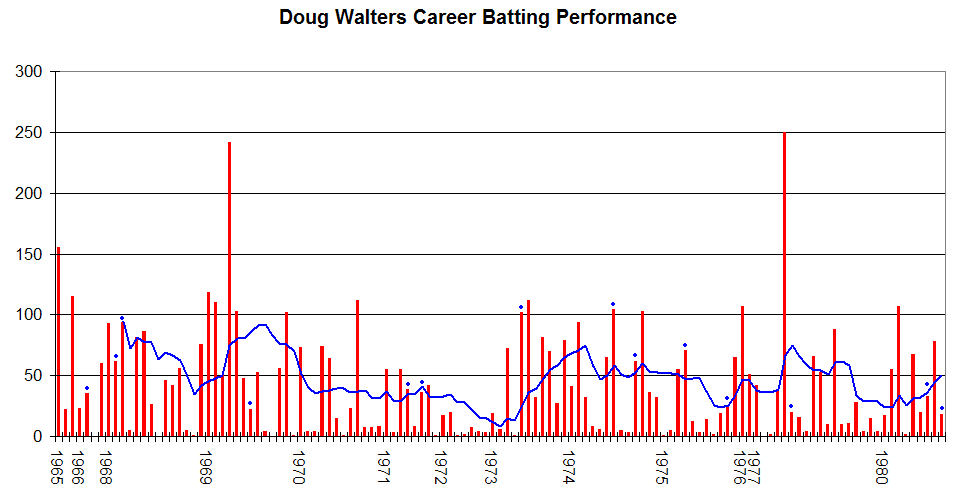
Doug Walters' career performance graph.
