= Umesh Kulkarni (cricketer) =

Indian cricketer (born 1942)

Personal information
- Full name: Umesh Narayan Kulkarni
- Born: 7 March 1942 (age 84); Alibagh, British India
- Height: 5 ft 6.5 in (1.69 m)
- Batting: Left-handed
- Bowling: Left-arm fast-medium

International information
- National side: India
- Test debut (cap 117): 23 December 1967 v Australia
- Last Test: 22 February 1968 v New Zealand

Career statistics
| Competition | Test | First-class |
|---|---|---|
| Matches | 4 | 29 |
| Runs scored | 13 | 158 |
| Batting average | 4.33 | 7.90 |
| 100s/50s | 0/0 | 0/0 |
| Top score | 7 | 26* |
| Balls bowled | 448 | 2,969 |
| Wickets | 5 | 40 |
| Bowling average | 47.60 | 39.95 |
| 5 wickets in innings | 0 | 0 |
| 10 wickets in match | 0 | 0 |
| Best bowling | 2/37 | 4/43 |
| Catches/stumpings | 0/– | 4/– |
- Source: Cricinfo, 10 September 2022

Umesh Narayan Kulkarni (born 7 March 1942) is a former Indian cricketer who played four Test matches for India in 1967–68 on the tour to Australia and New Zealand.

A left-arm fast-medium bowler, Kulkarni played domestic cricket in India, mostly for Bombay, from 1963–64 to 1969–70. His best first-class figures were 4 for 43 for India against Ceylon in 1964–65. He was selected for the 1967–68 tour to Australia and New Zealand despite having taken only four wickets in four matches in the 1966–67 season in India. He played in four of the eight Tests on the tour, taking five wickets.

After the tour, injuries ended Kulkarni's playing career. He later worked for the Tata Group.
