= Carl Coetzee =

South African cricket umpire (born 1929)

Personal information
- Full name: Carl Malcolm Paisley Coetzee
- Born: 3 August 1929 (age 97); Goodwood, Cape Town, South Africa

Umpiring information
- Tests umpired: 3 (1970)
- Source: Cricinfo, 3 July 2013

Carl Coetzee (born 3 August 1929) is a former South African cricket umpire. He stood in three Test matches in 1970.

== See also ==
- List of Test cricket umpires
