= Jack Potter =

Australian cricketer

Personal information
- Full name: Jack Potter
- Born: 13 April 1938 (age 88); Coburg, Melbourne, Victoria, Australia
- Batting: Right-handed
- Bowling: Leg-break and googly
- Role: Batsman

Domestic team information
- Years: Team
- 1956/57–1967/68: Victoria
- FC debut: 22 January 1957 Victoria v Tasmania
- Last FC: 22 December 1967 Victoria v New South Wales

Career statistics
Competition	First-class
Matches	104
Runs scored	6,142
Batting average	41.22
100s/50s	14/33
Top score	221
Balls bowled	2,416
Wickets	31
Bowling average	41.51
5 wickets in innings	0
10 wickets in match	0
Best bowling	4/20
Catches/stumpings	85/–
- Source: CricketArchive, 4 February 2009

Jack Potter (born 13 April 1938) is an Australian former cricketer who played 81 matches for Victoria. He also represented Australia, although never in a Test.

== Biography ==
Potter was born at Coburg, Victoria in 1938 and made his first-class debut in January 1957 against Tasmania making only 6, he made his Sheffield Shield debut in the final game of the season against Western Australia scoring 21. The following season he scored two centuries, 115 and 110, both coming against South Australia as he cemented his place in the state side.

Potter scored two more centuries during 1959 and toured New Zealand with Australia B in February 1960. In 1960–61 he scored two centuries and shared in 252 and 237 run partnerships with Bill Lawry. After a patchy 1961–62 season, he was the third highest runscorer in the Sheffield Shield 1962/63 season, he also scored a century against the touring MCC.

In December 1963 he scored 123* for a Combined XI against the touring South Africans, it earned him a place in the 12 man squad for the second Test however Tom Veivers was selected ahead of him. Potter once again finished the season with two centuries and an average of 55.50 and earned a place on the tour of England in 1964.

In the first Test of the 1964 Ashes Potter was once again twelfth man, towards the end of the tour Potter fractured his skull during a one-day match in the Netherlands. He was therefore unable to tour India and Pakistan along with the rest of the team where he was likely to make his Test debut.

Potter was dropped halfway through the 1964–65 season after poor form but the following season he scored his best first-class score of 221 against New South Wales, however he passed 50 only once more during the season.

In 1966–67 Potter was made captain of Victoria and led them to the Sheffield Shield title, averaging 53.50 during the season. Halfway through the 1967–68 season he retired from cricket at the age of 29. He scored 82 and 105* in his final match, passing 5,000 runs for Victoria during his final innings.

Throughout his first-class career he also played, and captained, Fitzroy Cricket Club. In September 1974 Potter was appointed as Head Coach of Victoria, the first to hold such a role. Between 1987 and 1989 he was the inaugural head coach of the Australian Cricket Academy helping in the development of Shane Warne.

Potter's notable achievements include holding the record for being 12th man for Australia the most times without winning a cap (thrice) and being the first prominent spinner to bowl a 'doosra' (a leg-break bowled with an off-break action).
