= Ian Redpath =

Australian cricketer (1941–2024)

Ian Redpath MBE
Personal information
- Born: 11 May 1941; Geelong, Victoria, Australia
- Died: 1 December 2024 (aged 83)
- Batting: Right-handed
- Bowling: Right-arm medium
- Role: Batsman

International information
- National side: Australia
- Test debut (cap 227): 1 January 1964 v South Africa
- Last Test: 31 January 1976 v West Indies
- ODI debut (cap 8): 5 January 1971 v England
- Last ODI: 20 December 1975 v West Indies

Domestic team information
- Years: Team
- 1961/62–1975/76: Victoria

Career statistics
Competition	Test	ODI	FC	LA
Matches	66	5	226	16
Runs scored	4737	46	14,993	255
Batting average	43.45	9.19	41.99	15.93
100s/50s	8/31	0/0	32/84	0/1
Top score	171	24	261	62
Balls bowled	64	0	792	71
Wickets	0	0	13	5
Bowling average	–	–	35.84	13.60
5 wickets in innings	–	–	0	0
10 wickets in match	–	–	0	0
Best bowling	–	–	3/24	2/0
Catches/stumpings	83/–	2/–	211/–	5/–
- Source: Cricinfo, 12 December 2005

Ian Ritchie Redpath MBE (11 May 1941 – 1 December 2024) was an Australian international cricketer who played in 66 Test matches and five One Day Internationals between 1964 and 1976. Greg Chappell said he was one of only two players he knew who would kill to get into the Australian Test team, the other being Rod Marsh.

== Career ==
Educated at Geelong College, Redpath played first-class cricket for Victoria in 92 matches, scoring 6,103 runs with a highest score of 261 made in only his tenth first-class innings, scored in February 1962 against a Queensland attack including Wes Hall.

He made his test debut on New Year's Day at Melbourne in the second test of the 1963–64 series against South Africa. Opening the batting with Bill Lawry, the pair added 219 before Redpath was bowled on 97. Redpath was the last Australian Test cricketer to play as an amateur. He declined the match fee in his early Tests in order not to jeopardise his Australian rules football career in the Victorian Amateur Football Association (VAFA), where he played for Geelong Amateurs and was a four-time club best and fairest winner. His playing permit was revoked when he eventually accepted a match fee for the 1964 Ashes series, but it was restored by the VAFA 60 years later in August 2024.

With his lean, gangly body and long neck, Redpath attracted the early nickname "Gandhi" among his teammates. However, when some concerns about this were expressed by local fans on the Australian tour of India in 1964–65, his colleagues permanently reverted to the simpler "Redders". Originally a sweet striker of the ball, Redpath turned into something of a stonewaller, with impressive powers of concentration and a sound technique. He matured late. It would not be until the Sydney test of February 1969 against the West Indies that he reached his maiden test century. In that same series, at Adelaide, he was infamously run out backing up at the bowler's end by Charlie Griffith, without the customary warning from the bowler.

Having broken through with a big score, Redpath flourished and proceeded to score seven Test centuries in the second half of his career, including five in his final 15 Tests, and three in his final test series in 1975–76 whilst opening the batting against a vaunted West Indian fast bowling attack featuring Michael Holding and Andy Roberts. It was not until his penultimate test that he struck his first six, advancing down the wicket to loft Lance Gibbs over the fence. Having done so, he promptly hit another six in the same innings. Considered the most correct batsman in the world by Trevor Goddard in 1966–67, in his maturity, he was a fine player of spin bowling.

=== Vice-captaincy ===
He was Australian vice captain to Ian Chappell in 1974–75, and to Greg Chappell in 1975–76. He was batting when the young Greg Chappell made a century on debut against England in 1970–71, who later wrote

My first innings in Test cricket was, as you might expect, a trying experience, but proved to be one of the best cricket lessons of my career, thanks to Ian Redpath. I came to the wicket with Australia reeling at 5/107 to join "Redders", who had watched three quick wickets fall at the other end. Illingworth and Snow, sensing that one more wicket would see them through our batting line up, stepped up their attack on the senior member of our partnership. "Snowy" concentrated his attack short of a length on "Redders" off-stump, with a liberal sprinkling of shorter pitched balls for good measure. Ian made a point of not playing at anything he didn't have to and ducked or swayed away from the shorter deliveries. Each time he swayed or ducked he came back to the upright position and sneered at "Snowy". It may not have looked all that pretty, but it was pretty effective as both Illingworth and Snow became more and more frustrated. Ian's example at the other end made me feel that if it meant that much to him to keep his wicket intact then I had better make sure I try just as hard at my end to keep mine intact. Fortunately we both succeeded and our partnership put us into a sound position, but from my point of view I had received an invaluable lesson in what Test match batting was all about from one of the most courageous batsmen ever to play for Australia.

In that match, Redpath made his highest Test score of 171 before he was caught and bowled by Ray Illingworth. He and the younger Chappell put on 219 for the sixth wicket. Redpath made 497 runs (49.70) in the series and the England fast bowler John Snow wrote "I liked bowling to him least of all" and added that he was "a real nuisance batsman".

At Auckland in 1973–74, he carried his bat for 159* out of a total of 346 against New Zealand. Redpath shared a first-wicket century stand in Tests with four different partners – Bill Lawry, Keith Stackpole, Rick McCosker and Alan Turner.

Redpath was widely regarded as an affable individual. However, during player payment negotiations in 1974–75, despite record takings at the gate, the Australian Cricket Board refused any thought of a player pay rise. When Australian Cricket Board administrator Alan Barnes told a dressing room of Australian cricketers that there were 50,000 others who would be prepared to play for Australia for nothing, the normally mild-mannered Redpath reacted. According to Ian Chappell, Redpath grabbed Barnes around the throat and had him up against a wall, saying "You bloody idiot. Of course there are 500,000 out there who would play for nothing. But how bloody good would the Australian team be?"

Previously, when then captain Bill Lawry drafted a stinging letter to the board critical of the arrangements that players had been forced to endure on the combined tours of India and South Africa in 1969–70, Redpath proposed that all the players should sign it. Lawry demurred, signing it only in his own name. This sealed the fate of Lawry's career. Redpath was one of the few to survive that disastrous tour of South Africa with a reputation intact, averaging 47.17 in the four Tests. During an innings on tour of 152 against Orange Free State at Bloemfontein, he scored 32 runs off a six-ball over, which remains a record for any Australian in first class cricket.

An outstanding fieldsman in the slips or at short leg, Redpath took 83 Test catches. His bowling was undistinguished; he was once called for throwing against Glamorgan in 1964.

=== World Series Cricket ===
Redpath retired from Test cricket in order to devote himself full-time to proprietorship of an antique business in Geelong. He had already declined the 1975 Ashes tour to tend to this neglected enterprise. However his absence from top cricket was brief. After a season out of the game, he signed for World Series Cricket, lured by a personal visit to Geelong by Kerry Packer's lieutenant Austin Robertson, and despite Packer's initial reluctance to contract the Victorian. As with many of his colleagues, the personal costs of supporting the rebel entrepreneur were significant; after two decades of service to the South Melbourne Cricket Club, Redpath was made persona non-grata. In an early world series match at Kardinia Park, Geelong in 1977–78, Redpath snapped his Achilles tendon, an injury that ruled him out for the season. Packer declared that Redpath would be paid for the duration. The Victorian repaid the loyalty by returning again for 1978–79, playing mainly in World Series country cup games. He was recalled for international duties once more, playing two supertests at the age of 37. At Sydney, against the by then fearsome West Indies XI attack, he took blow after blow on the body, holding out for 143 minutes to make 9, and adding 71 critical runs with David Hookes which contributed to an improbable 10 wicket victory for the Australian XI.

He remains among Victoria's top ten run-makers of all time. Years after his WSC days, Redpath was accepted back into the Victorian fold and appointed the coach of Victoria.

== Later life and death ==
Redpath was appointed a Member of the Most Excellent Order of the British Empire (MBE) in the 1975 Birthday Honours for services to cricket. He wrote his cricketing memoirs, Always Reddy, with Neill Phillipson in 1976. After retiring from playing, he coached Victoria.

When Redpath retired from the antique business, he remained active at the Geelong Cricket Club.

In January 2023, Redpath was inducted into the Australian Cricket Hall of Fame.

Redpath died on 1 December 2024, at the age of 83. Australian team wore black armbands in 2nd Test Match of Border-Gavaskar Trophy against India to commemorate death of Ian Redpath and Phillip Hughes.
