= Lou Rowan =

Australian cricket umpire (1925–2017)

Personal information
- Full name: Louis Patrick Rowan
- Born: 2 May 1925; Murwillumbah, New South Wales, Australia
- Died: 3 February 2017 (aged 91); Warwick, Queensland, Australia
- Role: International umpire

Umpiring information
- Tests umpired: 25 (1963–1971)
- ODIs umpired: 1 (1971)
- Source: ESPNcricinfo, 30 October 2009

Louis Patrick "Lou" Rowan (2 May 1925 – 3 February 2017), was an Australian Test cricket match umpire.

He umpired 25 Test matches between 1963 and 1971. His first match was between Australia and England at Sydney on 11 to 15 January 1963, won by Australia with Alan Davidson taking 9 wickets, and Bob Simpson scoring 91 and taking 5 wickets in an innings. Rowan's partner was Bill Smyth.

Rowan's last Test match was also between Australia and England at Sydney on 12 to 17 February 1971, a dramatic game won by England by 62 runs to regain The Ashes. In this match captain Ray Illingworth led the English players from the field following a crowd disturbance after fast bowler John Snow had hit Australian lower-order batsman Terry Jenner on the head with a bouncer. Rowan had issued Snow with a warning for intimidatory bowling and Snow's and Illingworth's displeasure was clear to the crowd who booed passionately. When Snow finished his over and moved to his fielding position on the boundary, he was grabbed by a spectator, and had beer-cans thrown at him. Following the English walk-off, Rowan advised them to either resume or forfeit the match, and the players returned after the ground was cleared. Rowan's colleague was Tom Brooks.

When the third Test of that series, scheduled for Melbourne was abandoned without a ball bowled, a 40-over match was played, won by Australia by 5 wickets. Rowan (and Brooks) thus became the first umpires to stand in a One Day International match.

In 1971/72 season, a scheduled tour of Australia by South Africa was cancelled following political and moral protests against the apartheid policies of the South African government. In its place a 'World Team' visited Australia and played a series of Test standard, although never officially recognised. Rowan stood in three of these matches, including the match at Perth where Dennis Lillee took 8/29 in an innings.

In his off-field life Rowan was a policeman.

== See also ==
- Australian Test Cricket Umpires
- List of test umpires
