= Paul Sheahan =

Australian cricketer (born 1946)

Personal information
- Full name: Andrew Paul Sheahan
- Born: 30 September 1946 (age 80); Werribee, Victoria, Australia
- Batting: Right-handed
- Relatives: William Cooper (great-grandfather)

International information
- National side: Australia
- Test debut (cap 243): 23 December 1967 v India
- Last Test: 5 January 1974 v New Zealand
- ODI debut (cap 15): 24 August 1972 v England
- Last ODI: 28 August 1972 v England

Domestic team information
- Years: Team
- 1965/66–1973/74: Victoria

Career statistics
Competition	Test	ODI	FC	LA
Matches	31	3	133	11
Runs scored	1,594	75	7,987	176
Batting average	33.91	25.00	46.16	22.00
100s/50s	2/7	0/1	19/39	0/1
Top score	127	50	202	50
Balls bowled	–	–	138	–
Wickets	–	–	1	–
Bowling average	–	–	66.00	–
5 wickets in innings	–	–	0	–
10 wickets in match	–	–	0	–
Best bowling	–	–	1/19	–
Catches/stumpings	17/–	0/–	89/–	4/–
- Source: CricketArchive, 23 October 2010

Andrew Paul Sheahan AM (born 30 September 1946) is a former Australian international cricketer who played 31 Test matches and three One Day Internationals as an opening and middle order batsman between 1967 and 1973.

He made his first-class debut in 1965 for the Victorian Sheffield Shield team against New South Wales scoring 62 and 5. An elegant stroke maker and fine cover fieldsman, his highest first-class score was 202 for Victoria against South Australia in 1966.

He made his Test debut the following year against the touring Indian team, scoring 81 and 35 in Adelaide batting at number three. His first Test century was a chanceless 114 against India in Kanpur in 1969 as a middle order batsmen. He toured England twice (1968 and 1972) and India and South Africa in 1969–70.

His form faltered after returning from the South African tour and he was dropped from the Australian team after the 2nd Test against the touring English team in 1970–71. However it was as an opening batsman that marked his return as an established Test cricketer, and he scored 127 against Pakistan in the Melbourne Test of 1972–73. Seemingly on the verge of becoming Australia's regular Test opening batsman, he retired from Test cricket at 26 to concentrate on his teaching career. He played one further season of interstate cricket, scoring 783 runs at 52.20 to help Victoria to victory in the Sheffield Shield in 1973–74.

He is a cousin of football journalist Mike Sheahan.

== Education ==
Sheahan was educated at The Geelong College and the University of Melbourne, where he resided at Ormond College, and obtained a Bachelor of Science and Diploma of Education.

== Career ==
Sheahan was Headmaster of Melbourne Grammar School from 1995 to 2009, having been principal of his old school Geelong College from 1986 to 1995, Second Master of St Peter's College, Adelaide from 1984 to 1985, and Housemaster of Manifold House, Geelong Grammar School from 1979 to 1983. Before working in Geelong, he taught at Winchester College in England.

He held the post of Vice President of the Melbourne Cricket Club from 2003 until he was elected president on 17 February 2011.

== Honours ==
In the January 2014, Australia Day Honours List Sheahan was made a Member of the Order of Australia (AM) "For significant service to secondary education as a teacher, and through roles with sporting, charitable and community organisations."

He is a Fellow of the Australian Institute of Management.

In 1983, Sheahan suggested that the annual World Series Cup limited overs series may be fixed, stating that, "Mr Packer [the owner of the television station which broadcast the matches] has a fair hand in — or Mr Packer's organisation has a fair hand in —saying who actually plays off in the final.”
