= Alan Connolly (cricketer) =

Australian cricketer

Personal information
- Full name: Alan Norman Connolly
- Born: 29 June 1939 (age 87); Skipton, Victoria, Australia
- Height: 188 cm (6 ft 2 in)
- Batting: Right-handed
- Bowling: Right-arm fast-medium
- Role: Bowler

International information
- National side: Australia
- Test debut (cap 225): 6 December 1963 v South Africa
- Last Test: 9 January 1971 v England
- Only ODI (cap 3): 5 January 1971 v England

Domestic team information
- Years: Team
- 1959–1971: Victoria
- 1969–1970: Middlesex

Career statistics
Competition	Test	ODI	FC	LA
Matches	29	1	201	32
Runs scored	260	–	1,073	70
Batting average	10.40	–	8.79	7.77
100s/50s	0/0	–	0/0	0/0
Top score	37	–	40	13
Balls bowled	7,818	64	43,578	1,536
Wickets	102	0	676	41
Bowling average	29.22	–	26.58	21.24
5 wickets in innings	4	0	25	1
10 wickets in match	0	0	4	0
Best bowling	6/47	0/62	9/67	5/22
Catches/stumpings	17/–	0/–	77/–	9/–
- Source: Cricket Archive, 20 October 2010

Alan Norman Connolly (born 29 June 1939) is a former Australian cricketer who played in 29 Tests and one ODI from 1963 to 1971. He played first-class cricket for Victoria and Middlesex from 1959 to 1971.

== Cricket career ==
Connolly was born in the small country town of Skipton, Victoria. A fast bowler early in his career, injury and advice from his state captain Jack Potter led him to decrease his pace to increase his accuracy and movement off the pitch and through the air.

Connolly toured England with the Australian team in 1964 but was hampered by injury and poor form. In Victoria's Sheffield Shield victory over Queensland in February 1965, he took his best first-class innings figures of 9 for 67 in the first innings and made his highest score of 40. Connolly led the Victorian attack in Victoria's victory in the Sheffield Shield in the 1966–67 season, taking 46 wickets at 26.91, and was selected to tour New Zealand at the end of the season. He led Australia's attack in the four matches against New Zealand, taking 16 wickets at 22.25.

At the start of the 1967–68 season Connolly took 6 for 104 and 7 for 61 in Victoria's 10-wicket victory over South Australia, and was selected in the Test team again. After he returned to the Test team, Connolly became a reliable bowler in partnership with Graham McKenzie. He played an important part in Australia's 159-run victory at Old Trafford in 1968, taking match figures of 41–19–61–3, the only time England lost a match in a sequence of 40 Tests between 1966 and 1971. He headed Australia's bowling figures for the series, with 23 wickets at 21.34. He played the 1969 and 1970 seasons for Middlesex, but was again hampered by injuries during the 1970 season, and decided not to return for a third season in 1971.

On the tour of South Africa in 1969–70, Connolly took 20 wickets at 26.10, in a series in which Australia lost all four Tests, and his four fellow pace bowlers took only 17 wickets between them at a combined average of 61.70. He took match figures of 55–22–109–7 in the First Test at Cape Town, and in the Fourth Test he took his best Test innings figures of 6 for 47.

He was recalled for his last Test match in the Fourth Test at Sydney in the 1970–71 Ashes series, but was dropped after taking just one wicket in Australia's 299-run loss. He retired from first-class cricket at the end of the season. His 330 wickets for Victoria set a new record for the state.
