= English cricket team in Australia in 1970–71 =

International cricket tour

The England cricket team toured Australia in the 1970–71 season to play a six-match Test series against Australia for The Ashes. The tour was organised by the Marylebone Cricket Club and the team played non-Test matches under the MCC name.

The Third Test at Melbourne was abandoned without a ball being bowled. England's captain Ray Illingworth had won the toss and decided to field but rain began at that point and eventually caused the abandonment. The game was replaced by the first-ever Limited Overs International on what should have been the final day of the Test Match. Despite misgivings on the part of the England team, it was decided to stage a 7th Test so that the full complement of six matches could be completed.

England won the series 2–0 with four matches drawn and one abandoned, so England regained The Ashes for the first time since 1959.

== Test series summary ==
- 1st Test at Brisbane Cricket Ground – match drawn
- 2nd Test at Western Australia Cricket Association Ground – match drawn
- 3rd Test at Melbourne Cricket Ground – match abandoned
- 4th Test at Sydney Cricket Ground – England won by 299 runs
- 5th Test at Melbourne Cricket Ground – match drawn
- 6th Test at Adelaide Oval – match drawn
- 7th Test at Sydney Cricket Ground – England won by 62 runs

== Limited overs international ==
The first-ever limited overs international came about by chance, being hastily arranged to take place on what should have been the final day of the abandoned Third Test. Australia won by 5 wickets.

== Bibliography ==
- Harte, Chris (1993). A History of Australian Cricket. London: André Deutsch. ISBN 978-02-33988-25-2.
- Preston, Norman, ed. (1972). Wisden Cricketers' Almanack (109th ed.). London: Sporting Handbooks Ltd. ISBN 978-08-50200-24-9.
- Robinson, Ray (1975). On Top Down Under. Australia: Cassell. ISBN 978-07-26973-64-2.
- Ross, Gordon, ed. (1971). Playfair Cricket Annual (24th ed.). London: Dickens Publishing Ltd. ISBN 978-08-50902-97-6.
