= Eric Freeman (cricketer) =

Australian sportsman (1944–2020)

Personal information
- Full name: Eric Walter Freeman
- Born: 13 July 1944; Semaphore, South Australia
- Died: 14 December 2020 (aged 76); Woodville South, South Australia
- Nickname: Fritzy
- Batting: Right-handed
- Bowling: Right-arm fast-medium
- Role: All-rounder

International information
- National side: Australia
- Test debut (cap 244): 19 January 1968 v India
- Last Test: 19 February 1970 v South Africa

Domestic team information
- Years: Team
- 1964/65–1973/74: South Australia

Career statistics
Competition	Test	FC	LA
Matches	11	83	8
Runs scored	345	2,244	57
Batting average	19.16	19.17	9.50
100s/50s	0/2	1/9	0/0
Top score	76	116	21
Balls bowled	2,183	14,281	418
Wickets	34	241	8
Bowling average	33.17	27.75	28.25
5 wickets in innings	0	7	0
10 wickets in match	0	2	0
Best bowling	4/52	8/47	3/29
Catches/stumpings	5/–	60/–	3/–
- Source: Cricinfo, 15 December 2020

Eric Walter "Fritzy" Freeman OAM (13 July 1944 – 14 December 2020) was an Australian cricketer who played in 11 Test matches from 1968 to 1970. He was also a leading Australian rules footballer with Port Adelaide Football Club, playing 116 games between 1964 and 1972, kicking 390 goals, and playing in their 1965 premiership team.

== Life ==
Born in Semaphore, South Australia, Freeman played cricket for South Australia from 1964–65 to 1973–74. He toured with Australian teams to New Zealand in 1966–67, England in 1968, and India and South Africa in 1969–70. His only first-class century was 116 for the Australians against Northamptonshire in 1968, scored in 90 minutes with five sixes and 13 fours. His best bowling figures were 8 for 47 for South Australia against the New Zealand team in 1967–68 (11 for 97 in the match).

Freeman was the first batsman in test history to get off the mark in his test career by scoring a six.

Following his retirement from playing, Freeman was a commentator and statistician on cricket and football for ABC Radio in Adelaide until his retirement in 2010.

In the 2002 Queen's Birthday Honours Freeman was awarded the Medal of the Order of Australia for "service to sport, particularly cricket as a player, administrator and commentator".
