= 1975–76 Gillette Cup (Australia) =

- Dates: 26 October 1975 – 8 February 1976
- Administrator: Australian Cricket Board
- Cricket format: List A (40 overs)
- Tournament format: Knockout
- Champions: Queensland (1st title)
- Participants: 6
- Matches: 5
- Most runs: (Queensland) Greg Chappell (138)
- Most wickets: (Queensland) Greg Chappell (8)

The 1975–76 Gillette Cup was the seventh edition of what is now the Marsh One-Day Cup, the domestic limited-overs cricket competition in Australia. This was the third season of the competition under the Gillette Cup name.

Sponsored by Gillette, the competition was played using a knockout format, and featured the six state teams. The 1975–76 season was the first not to feature New Zealand, which had been invited but had to withdraw after a scheduling conflict. Queensland and Western Australia eventually progressed to the final, held at the Gabba, with Queensland winning by four runs to claim its first domestic one-day title. Queensland's captain, Greg Chappell, led the tournament in both runs and wickets.

== Squads ==
New South Wales	Queensland	South Australia
Rick McCosker (c); Graeme Beard; Dave Chardon; David Colley; Ross Collins; Gary Gilmour; Kerry O'Keeffe; Steve Rixon; Marshall Rosen; Peter Toohey; Alan Turner	Greg Chappell (c); Phil Carlson; Ian Davis; Geoff Dymock; Malcolm Francke; Martin Kent; Jeffrey Langley; John Maclean; Alan Ogilvie; Denis Schuller; Jeff Thomson; Sam Trimble; Maxwell Walters	Ian Chappell (c); Geoff Attenborough; Gary Cosier; Barry Curtin; Rick Drewer; Jeff Hammond; David Hookes; Terry Jenner; Ashley Mallett; Wayne Prior; Ashley Woodcock; Denis Yagmich
Tasmania	Victoria	Western Australia
Jack Simmons (c); Kevin Badcock; Trevor Docking; Bruce Doolan; Stephen Howard; David Hughes; Mike Leedham; Graeme Mansfield; Mick Norman; Bob Panitzki; Gary Whitney	Ian Redpath (c); Ray Bright; John Douglas; Paul Hibbert; Alan Hurst; Trevor Laughlin; Ray Robinson; Richie Robinson; John Scholes; Les Stillman; Max Walker; Graham Yallop	Rod Marsh (c); Terry Alderman; Dennis Baker; Ian Brayshaw; Ric Charlesworth; Wayne Clark; Wally Edwards; Kim Hughes; John Inverarity; Bruce Laird; Rob Langer; Dennis Lillee; Mick Malone; Bruce Yardley

== Fixtures ==
First round
Victoria
BYE
Western Australia
BYE
23 November – Adelaide
South Australia	195
New South Wales	8/180
1 January – Hobart
Queensland	6/244
Tasmania	158

Semi-finals
26 October – Perth
Victoria	8/193
Western Australia	7/195
11 January – Brisbane
Queensland	182
South Australia	97

Final
8 February – Brisbane
Queensland	7/236
Western Australia	232

=== First round ===
23 November 1975
Scorecard

South Australia; 195 (40 overs)	v	New South Wales; 8/180 (39.6 overs)
Rick Drewer 39; David Colley 4/54		David Colley 35*; Terry Jenner 4/54

South Australia won by concession
Adelaide Oval, Adelaide
Attendance: 3,284
Player of the match: David Colley (NSW)

- New South Wales conceded the match after the loss of its eighth wicket, at which stage the team required 15 runs from two balls to win.

1 January 1976
Scorecard

Queensland; 6/244 (40 overs)	v	Tasmania; 158 (33.6 overs)
Alan Ogilvie 73 (108); Gary Whitney 2/47 (8 overs)		David Hughes 66 (91); Denis Schuller 3/22 (8 overs)

Queensland won by 86 runs
TCA Ground, Hobart
Attendance: 1,785
Player of the match: David Hughes (Tas)

=== Semi-finals ===
26 October 1975
Scorecard

Victoria; 8/193 (40 overs)	v	Western Australia; 7/195 (37.3 overs)
Ian Redpath 62; Dennis Lillee 3/33		John Inverarity 66*; John Douglas 3/45

Western Australia won by 3 wickets
WACA Ground, Perth
Player of the match: Mick Malone (WA)

- Victoria and Western Australia had both received a bye through to the semi-finals.

11 January 1976
Scorecard

Queensland; 182 (37 overs)	v	South Australia; 97 (21.1 overs)
Jeffrey Langley 59 (66); Wayne Prior 4/24 (7 overs)		David Hookes 45 (52); Greg Chappell 3/20 (21. overs)

Queensland won by 85 runs
The Gabba, Brisbane
Attendance: 8,766
Player of the match: Jeffrey Langley (Qld)

=== Final ===
8 February 1976
Scorecard

Queensland; 7/236 (40 overs)	v	Western Australia; 232 (39 overs)
Greg Chappell 61 (63); Dennis Lillee 3/41 (8 overs)		Ian Brayshaw 52 (64); Greg Chappell 3/38 (7 overs)

Queensland won by 4 runs
The Gabba, Brisbane
Attendance: 11,134
