= 1969–70 Vehicle & General Australasian knock-out competition =

1969–70 V & G Australasian Knock-Out Competition
- Administrator: Australian Cricket Board
- Cricket format: Limited overs cricket
- Tournament format: knockout
- Champions: New Zealand (1st title)
- Participants: 7
- Matches: 6
- Attendance: 20,780 (3,463 per match)
- Most runs: Ross Collins (NSW) 98 runs
- Most wickets: Graeme Watson 8

The 1969–70 Vehicle & General Australasian knock-out competition was a List A tournament took place from November 1969 to January 1970. It was the first season of the Australian domestic limited-overs cricket tournament. Seven teams representing the six states in Australia, and a New Zealand team, took part in the competition in a knockout format. The competition began on 22 November 1969 when Victoria took on Tasmania at the Melbourne Cricket Ground.

After five matches were played, the final took place on 1 January 1970 at the Melbourne Cricket Ground between Victoria and New Zealand. After winning the toss, Victoria were bowled out for 129, with New Zealand chasing the total down with six wickets to spare.

== Format ==
The first season of the competition was a straight knockout competition between the six states of Australia and a team that represented New Zealand at domestic level.

First Round
22 November – Melbourne
Victoria	2/131
Tasmania	130
30 November – Perth
Western Australia	8/188
South Australia	187
7 December – Sydney
New South Wales	8/227
Queensland	195
New Zealand
BYE

Semi-finals
30 December – Melbourne
Victoria	157
Western Australia	59
30 December – Sydney
New South Wales	150
New Zealand	6/153

Final
1 January – Melbourne
Victoria	129
New Zealand	4/130

== Fixtures ==
=== First round ===
22 November 1969
Scorecard

Tasmania; 9/130 (40 overs)	v	Victoria; 2/131 (20.7 overs)
Stephen Howard 39 (62); Graeme Watson 3/32 (8 overs)		Ken Eastwood 69 (81); Harold Allen 2/37 (7 overs)

Victoria won by 8 wickets
Melbourne Cricket Ground, Melbourne
Attendance: 4,052
Player of the match: Stephen Howard (Tas)

- Victoria won the toss and elected to field.

30 November 1969
Scorecard

South Australia; 8/187 (40 overs)	v	Western Australia; 8/188 (39.7 overs)
Robert Gilbourne 68 (82); Ian Brayshaw 3/28 (8 overs)		Ian Brayshaw 58* (96); Ken Cunningham 3/32 (8 overs)

Western Australia won by 2 wickets
WACA Ground, Perth
Player of the match: Ian Brayshaw (WA)

- No Toss

7 December 1969
Scorecard

New South Wales; 8/227 (40 overs)	v	Queensland; 195 (36.7 overs)
Ross Collins 69* (?); Ian King 5/33 (8 overs)		Sam Trimble 56 (?); Ross Collins 3/48 (8 overs)

New South Wales won by 32 runs
Sydney Cricket Ground, Sydney
Attendance: 2,490
Player of the match: Ross Collins (NSW)

- Queensland won the toss and elected to field.

=== Semi-finals ===
30 December 1969
Scorecard

New South Wales; 150 (33.7 overs)	v	New Zealand; 6/153 (33.4 overs)
Alan Turner 66 (?); Hedley Howarth 5/22 (5.7 overs)		Brian Hastings 56* (?); Ross Collins 2/29 (6.4 overs)

New Zealand won by 4 wickets
Sydney Cricket Ground, Sydney
Player of the match: Hedley Howarth (NZ)

- New South Wales won the toss and elected to bat.

30 December 1969
Scorecard

Victoria; 157 (37.2 overs)	v	Western Australia; 59 (21.3 overs)
Bob Cowper 33 (49); Ian Brayshaw 3/47 (8 overs)		Ross Edwards 21 (32); Graeme Watson 5/20 (6.3 overs)

Victoria won by 98 runs
Melbourne Cricket Ground, Melbourne
Player of the match: Alan Thomson (Vic)

- Western Australia won the toss and elected to field.

=== Final ===
1 January 1970
Scorecard

Victoria; 129 (34.6 overs)	v	New Zealand; 4/130 (31.4 overs)
Les Joslin 29 (?); Bob Cunis 3/26 (8 overs)		Bevan Congdon 69 (133); Alan Thomson 2/44 (8 overs)

New Zealand won by 6 wickets
Melbourne Cricket Ground, Melbourne
Attendance: 14,238
Player of the match: Bevan Congdon (NZ)

- Victoria won the toss and elected to bat.

== See also ==
- 1969-70 Sheffield Shield season
