= International cricket in 2012 =

Cricket season

The 2012 international cricket season was from April 2012 to August 2012. One year after gaining the number-one ranking in the ICC Test Championship, England lost the ranking to South Africa in August 2012 following a 0–2 Test series defeat at home. Also in August 2012, England rose to number one in the ICC ODI Championship following ten consecutive ODI victories and the annual update of the rankings. The update also put South Africa and India within one rankings point behind England.

The previous number one ODI team was Australia, who slipped to number four after holding the top spot from September 2009. Shortly before they lost the ranking, they lost 0–4 in an ODI series in England. It marked the end to their era of dominance in ODI cricket which included three consecutive World Cup wins, two ICC Champions Trophy wins and finishing nine of the past eleven years with the number-one ranking. The annual update also put South Africa at the top of the ICC T20I Championship rankings, replacing England. However, the T20I rankings would change significantly as a result of the 2012 ICC World Twenty20 at the start of the following season.

== Season overview ==
International tours
Start date	Home team	Away team	Results [Matches]		
Start date	Home team	Away team	Test	ODI	T20I
17 May 2012	England	West Indies	2–0 [3]	2–0 [3]	1–0 [1]
1 June 2012	Sri Lanka	Pakistan	1–0 [3]	3–1 [5]	1–1 [2]
23 June 2012	Ireland	Australia	—	0–0 [1]	—
29 June 2012	England	Australia	—	4–0 [5]	—
30 June 2012	West Indies	New Zealand	2–0 [2]	4–1 [5]	2–0 [2]
18 July 2012	Ireland	Bangladesh	—	—	0–3 [3]
19 July 2012	England	South Africa	0–2 [3]	2–2 [5]	1–1 [3]
21 July 2012	Sri Lanka	India	—	1–4 [5]	0–1 [1]
24 July 2012	(Netherlands) Scotland	Bangladesh	—	—	1–0 [1]
25 July 2012	Netherlands	Bangladesh	—	—	1–1 [2]
23 August 2012	India	New Zealand	2–0 [2]	—	0–1 [2]
25 August 2012	Afghanistan	Australia	—	0–1 [1]	—
28 August 2012	Pakistan	Australia	—	1–2 [3]	2–1 [3]
Other international series
Start date	Series			Winners	
17 June 2012	(Zimbabwe) Twenty20 Triangular Series			Zimbabwe	
6 September 2012	(Trinidad and Tobago) Trinidad Quadrangular T20			Afghanistan	
Minor tours
Start date	Home team	Away team	Results [Matches]		
Start date	Home team	Away team	First-class		ODI
3 July 2012	Ireland	Afghanistan	0–0 [1]		1–0 [2]
4 July 2012	Scotland	Canada	0–0 [1]		1–0 [2]
Minor tournaments
Start date	Series			Winners	
3 September 2012	(Malaysia) ICC World Cricket League Division Four			Nepal	
15 September 2012	(Samoa) ICC World Cricket League Division Eight			Vanuatu	

== Pre-season rankings ==
ICC Test Championship 28 April 2012
Rank	Team	Matches	Points	Rating
1	England	44	5124	116
2	South Africa	32	3709	116
3	Australia	46	5153	112
4	India	46	5103	111
5	Pakistan	35	3781	108
6	Sri Lanka	38	3780	99
7	West Indies	34	2898	85
8	New Zealand	28	2366	85
9	Bangladesh	18	135	8

ICC ODI Championship 16 April 2012
Rank	Team	Matches	Points	Rating
1	Australia	49	6030	123
2	South Africa	30	3549	118
3	India	55	6409	117
4	England	39	4333	111
5	Sri Lanka	52	5745	110
6	Pakistan	45	4710	105
7	New Zealand	31	2667	86
8	West Indies	32	2753	86
9	Bangladesh	36	2408	67
10	Zimbabwe	33	1511	46
11	Ireland	14	504	36
12	Netherlands	9	137	15
13	Kenya	9	74	8

ICC T20I Championship 31 March 2012
Rank	Team	Matches	Points	Rating
1	England	14	1811	129
2	South Africa	12	1468	122
3	Sri Lanka	9	1056	117
4	New Zealand	14	1596	114
5	Pakistan	17	1817	107
6	Australia	15	1603	107
7	India	9	930	103
8	Ireland	10	946	95
9	West Indies	10	933	93
10	Afghanistan	6	500	83
11	Netherlands	5	321	64
12	Zimbabwe	9	463	51
13	Scotland	5	200	40
14	Canada	5	79	16
15	Kenya	6	75	13

Notes

- Zimbabwe is currently unranked in Tests, as it has played insufficient matches. It has 167 points and a rating of 42.
- Bangladesh is currently unranked in T20Is, as it has played insufficient matches.

== May ==
=== West Indies in England ===
Test series
No.	Date	Home captain	Away captain	Venue	Result
Test 2043	17–21 May	Andrew Strauss	Darren Sammy	Lord's, London	England by 5 wickets
Test 2044	25–29 May	Andrew Strauss	Darren Sammy	Trent Bridge, Nottingham	England by 9 wickets
Test 2045	7–11 June	Andrew Strauss	Darren Sammy	Edgbaston, Birmingham	Match drawn
ODI series
No.	Date	Home captain	Away captain	Venue	Result
ODI 3276	16 June	Alastair Cook	Darren Sammy	The Rose Bowl, Southampton	England by 114 runs (D/L)
ODI 3278	19 June	Alastair Cook	Darren Sammy	The Oval, London	England by 8 wickets
ODI 3278a	22 June	Alastair Cook	Darren Sammy	Headingley, Leeds	No result
Only T20I
No.	Date	Home captain	Away captain	Venue	Result
T20I 246	24 June	Stuart Broad	Darren Sammy	Trent Bridge, Nottingham	England by 7 wickets

== June ==
=== Pakistan in Sri Lanka ===
T20I series
No.	Date	Home captain	Away captain	Venue	Result
T20I 244	1 June	Mahela Jayawardene	Mohammad Hafeez	Mahinda Rajapaksa International Cricket Stadium, Hambantota	Sri Lanka by 37 runs
T20I 245	3 June	Mahela Jayawardene	Mohammad Hafeez	Mahinda Rajapaksa International Cricket Stadium, Hambantota	Pakistan by 23 runs
ODI series
No.	Date	Home captain	Away captain	Venue	Result
ODI 3272	7 June	Mahela Jayawardene	Misbah-ul-Haq	Pallekele International Cricket Stadium, Pallekele	Pakistan by 6 wickets
ODI 3273	9 June	Mahela Jayawardene	Misbah-ul-Haq	Pallekele International Cricket Stadium, Pallekele	Sri Lanka by 76 runs
ODI 3274	13 June	Mahela Jayawardene	Misbah-ul-Haq	R. Premadasa Stadium, Colombo	No result
ODI 3275	16 June	Mahela Jayawardene	Misbah-ul-Haq	R. Premadasa Stadium, Colombo	Sri Lanka by 44 runs
ODI 3277	18 June	Mahela Jayawardene	Misbah-ul-Haq	R. Premadasa Stadium, Colombo	Sri Lanka by 2 wickets
Test series
No.	Date	Home captain	Away captain	Venue	Result
Test 2046	22–26 June	Mahela Jayawardene	Mohammad Hafeez	Galle International Stadium, Galle	Sri Lanka by 209 runs
Test 2047	30 June–4 July	Mahela Jayawardene	Misbah-ul-Haq	Sinhalese Sports Club Ground, Colombo	Match drawn
Test 2048	8–12 July	Mahela Jayawardene	Misbah-ul-Haq	Pallekele International Cricket Stadium, Pallekele	Match drawn

=== Zimbabwe Twenty20 Triangular Series ===
Although contested by three ICC full member nations, this tournament does not have Twenty20 International status, because it was organised outside of the ICC Future Tours Programme. The matches are considered to be first-class-equivalent Twenty20 matches.

Pos	Team	Pld	W	L	T	NR	BP	Pts	NRR
1	South Africa	4	2	2	0	0	0	8	0.378
2	Zimbabwe	4	2	2	0	0	0	8	−0.086
3	Bangladesh	4	2	2	0	0	0	8	−0.280

Source: Points table on ESPN CricInfo

Twenty20 series
No.	Date	Team 1	Captain 1	Team 2	Captain 2	Venue	Result
Group stage
Match 1	17 June	Zimbabwe	Brendan Taylor	Bangladesh	Mushfiqur Rahim	Harare Sports Club, Harare	Zimbabwe by 11 runs
Match 2	19 June	Bangladesh	Mushfiqur Rahim	South Africa	Hashim Amla	Harare Sports Club, Harare	South Africa by 39 runs
Match 3	20 June	Zimbabwe	Brendan Taylor	South Africa	Hashim Amla	Harare Sports Club, Harare	Zimbabwe by 29 runs
Match 4	21 June	Zimbabwe	Brendan Taylor	Bangladesh	Mushfiqur Rahim	Harare Sports Club, Harare	Bangladesh by 6 wickets
Match 5	22 June	Bangladesh	Mushfiqur Rahim	South Africa	Hashim Amla	Harare Sports Club, Harare	Bangladesh by 3 wickets
Match 6	23 June	Zimbabwe	Brendan Taylor	South Africa	Hashim Amla	Harare Sports Club, Harare	South Africa by 6 wickets
Final
Final	24 June	Zimbabwe	Brendan Taylor	South Africa	Hashim Amla	Harare Sports Club, Harare	Zimbabwe by 9 wickets

=== Australia in Ireland ===
ODI
No.	Date	Home captain	Away captain	Venue	Result
ODI 3279	23 June	William Porterfield	Michael Clarke	Civil Service Cricket Club Ground, Belfast	No result

=== Australia in England ===
ODI series
No.	Date	Home captain	Away captain	Venue	Result
ODI 3280	29 June	Alastair Cook	Michael Clarke	Lord's, London	England by 15 runs
ODI 3281	1 July	Alastair Cook	Michael Clarke	The Oval, London	England by 6 wickets
ODI 3281b	4 July	Alastair Cook	Michael Clarke	Edgbaston, Birmingham	Match abandoned
ODI 3284	7 July	Alastair Cook	Michael Clarke	Riverside Ground, Chester-le-Street	England by 8 wickets
ODI 3286	10 July	Alastair Cook	Michael Clarke	Old Trafford, Manchester	England by 7 wickets

=== New Zealand vs West Indies in the United States ===
T20I series
No.	Date	Home captain	Away captain	Venue	Result
T20I 247	30 June	Darren Sammy	Ross Taylor	Central Broward Regional Park, Fort Lauderdale	West Indies by 56 runs
T20I 248	1 July	Darren Sammy	Ross Taylor	Central Broward Regional Park, Fort Lauderdale	West Indies by 61 runs

== July ==
=== Afghanistan in Ireland ===
2011–13 ICC World Cricket League Championship
No.	Date	Home captain	Away captain	Venue	Result
ODI 3281a	3 July	William Porterfield	Karim Sadiq	Clontarf Cricket Club Ground, Dublin	Match abandoned
ODI 3282	5 July	William Porterfield	Karim Sadiq	Clontarf Cricket Club Ground, Dublin	Ireland by 59 runs
2011–13 ICC Intercontinental Cup
No.	Date	Home captain	Away captain	Venue	Result
First-class	9–12 July	Kevin O'Brien	Karim Sadiq	Observatory Lane, Dublin	Match drawn

=== Canada in Scotland ===
2011–13 ICC Intercontinental Cup
No.	Date	Home captain	Away captain	Venue	Result
First-class	4–7 July	Gordon Drummond	Jimmy Hansra	Bothwell Castle Cricket Ground, Uddingston	Match abandoned
2011–13 ICC World Cricket League Championship
No.	Date	Home captain	Away captain	Venue	Result
ODI 3285a	9 July	Gordon Drummond	Jimmy Hansra	Cambusdoon New Ground, Ayr	Match abandoned
ODI 3287	11 July	Gordon Drummond	Jimmy Hansra	Cambusdoon New Ground, Ayr	Scotland by 4 wickets

=== New Zealand in West Indies ===
ODI series
No.	Date	Home captain	Away captain	Venue	Result
ODI 3283	5 July	Darren Sammy	Ross Taylor	Sabina Park, Kingston, Jamaica	West Indies by 9 wickets (D/L)
ODI 3285	7 July	Darren Sammy	Ross Taylor	Sabina Park, Kingston, Jamaica	West Indies by 55 runs
ODI 3288	11 July	Darren Sammy	Ross Taylor	Warner Park Stadium, Basseterre, St Kitts	New Zealand by 88 runs
ODI 3289	14 July	Darren Sammy	Ross Taylor	Warner Park Stadium, Basseterre, St Kitts	West Indies by 24 runs
ODI 3290	16 July	Darren Sammy	Ross Taylor	Warner Park Stadium, Basseterre, St Kitts	West Indies by 20 runs
Test series
No.	Date	Home captain	Away captain	Venue	Result
Test 2050	25–29 July	Darren Sammy	Ross Taylor	Sir Vivian Richards Stadium, North Sound, Antigua	West Indies by 9 wickets
Test 2052	2–6 August	Darren Sammy	Ross Taylor	Sabina Park, Kingston, Jamaica	West Indies by 5 wickets

=== Bangladesh in Ireland ===
T20I Series
No.	Date	Home captain	Away captain	Venue	Result
T20I 249	18 July	William Porterfield	Mushfiqur Rahim	Civil Service Cricket Club Ground, Belfast	Bangladesh by 71 runs
T20I 250	20 July	William Porterfield	Mushfiqur Rahim	Civil Service Cricket Club Ground, Belfast	Bangladesh by 1 run
T20I 251	21 July	William Porterfield	Mushfiqur Rahim	Civil Service Cricket Club Ground, Belfast	Bangladesh by 2 wickets

=== South Africa in England ===
Test series
No.	Date	Home captain	Away captain	Venue	Result
Test 2049	19–23 July	Andrew Strauss	Graeme Smith	The Oval, London	South Africa by an innings and 12 runs
Test 2051	2–6 August	Andrew Strauss	Graeme Smith	Headingley, Leeds	Match drawn
Test 2053	16–20 August	Andrew Strauss	Graeme Smith	Lord's, London	South Africa by 51 runs
ODI series
No.	Date	Home captain	Away captain	Venue	Result
ODI 3296	24 August	Alastair Cook	AB de Villiers	Sophia Gardens, Cardiff	No result
ODI 3298	28 August	Alastair Cook	AB de Villiers	The Rose Bowl, Southampton	South Africa by 80 runs
ODI 3300	31 August	Alastair Cook	AB de Villiers	The Oval, London	England by 4 wickets
ODI 3302	2 September	Alastair Cook	AB de Villiers	Lord's, London	England by 6 wickets
ODI 3304	5 September	Alastair Cook	AB de Villiers	Trent Bridge, Nottingham	South Africa by 7 wickets
T20I Series
No.	Date	Home captain	Away captain	Venue	Result
T20I 258	8 September	Stuart Broad	AB de Villiers	Riverside Ground, Chester-le-Street	South Africa by 7 wickets
T20I 260	10 September	Stuart Broad	AB de Villiers	Old Trafford, Manchester	No result
T20I 262	12 September	Stuart Broad	AB de Villiers	Edgbaston, Birmingham	England won by 28 runs

=== India in Sri Lanka ===
ODI series
No.	Date	Home captain	Away captain	Venue	Result
ODI 3291	21 July	Mahela Jayawardene	Mahendra Singh Dhoni	Mahinda Rajapaksa International Cricket Stadium, Hambantota	India by 21 runs
ODI 3292	24 July	Mahela Jayawardene	Mahendra Singh Dhoni	Mahinda Rajapaksa International Cricket Stadium, Hambantota	Sri Lanka by 9 wickets
ODI 3293	28 July	Mahela Jayawardene	Mahendra Singh Dhoni	R. Premadasa Stadium, Colombo	India by 5 wickets
ODI 3294	31 July	Mahela Jayawardene	Mahendra Singh Dhoni	R. Premadasa Stadium, Colombo	India by 6 wickets
ODI 3295	4 August	Angelo Mathews	Mahendra Singh Dhoni	Pallekele International Cricket Stadium, Pallekele	India by 20 runs
T20I
No.	Date	Home captain	Away captain	Venue	Result
T20I 255	7 August	Mahela Jayawardene	Mahendra Singh Dhoni	Pallekele International Cricket Stadium, Pallekele	India by 39 runs

=== Bangladesh vs Scotland in the Netherlands ===
T20I
No.	Date	Home captain	Away captain	Venue	Result
T20I 252	24 July	Gordon Drummond	Mushfiqur Rahim	Sportpark Westvliet, The Hague	Scotland by 34 runs

=== Bangladesh in the Netherlands ===
T20I
No.	Date	Home captain	Away captain	Venue	Result
T20I 253	25 July	Peter Borren	Mushfiqur Rahim	Sportpark Westvliet, The Hague	Bangladesh by 8 wickets
T20I 254	26 July	Peter Borren	Mushfiqur Rahim	Sportpark Westvliet, The Hague	Netherlands by 1 wicket

== August ==
=== New Zealand in India ===
Test series
No.	Date	Home captain	Away captain	Venue	Result
Test 2054	23–27 August	Mahendra Singh Dhoni	Ross Taylor	Rajiv Gandhi International Stadium, Hyderabad	India by an innings and 115 runs
Test 2055	31 August–4 September	Mahendra Singh Dhoni	Ross Taylor	M. Chinnaswamy Stadium, Bangalore	India by 5 wickets
T20I series
No.	Date	Home captain	Away captain	Venue	Result
T20I 258a	8 September	Mahendra Singh Dhoni	Ross Taylor	Dr. Y.S. Rajasekhara Reddy ACA-VDCA Cricket Stadium, Visakhapatnam	Match abandoned
T20I 261	11 September	Mahendra Singh Dhoni	Ross Taylor	M. A. Chidambaram Stadium, Chennai	New Zealand by 1 run

=== Bangladesh in Zimbabwe ===
Bangladesh were scheduled to tour Zimbabwe in August 2012, but the tour has been postponed to April 2013 as the pitches at both Queen's Park Oval, Bulawayo and Harare Sports Club, Harare are being relaid.

=== Australia vs Afghanistan in the United Arab Emirates ===
Only ODI
No.	Date	Home captain	Away captain	Venue	Result
ODI 3297	25 August	Nawroz Mangal	Michael Clarke	Sharjah Cricket Stadium, Sharjah	Australia by 66 runs

=== Pakistan vs Australia in the United Arab Emirates ===
ODI series
No.	Date	Home captain	Away captain	Venue	Result
ODI 3299	28 August	Misbah-ul-Haq	Michael Clarke	Sharjah Cricket Stadium, Sharjah	Australia by 4 wickets
ODI 3301	31 August	Misbah-ul-Haq	Michael Clarke	Sheikh Zayed Stadium, Abu Dhabi	Pakistan by 7 wickets
ODI 3303	3 September	Misbah-ul-Haq	Michael Clarke	Sharjah Cricket Stadium, Sharjah	Australia by 3 wickets
T20I series
No.	Date	Home captain	Away captain	Venue	Result
T20I 256	5 September	Mohammad Hafeez	George Bailey	Dubai International Cricket Stadium, Dubai	Pakistan by 7 wickets
T20I 257	7 September	Mohammad Hafeez	George Bailey	Dubai International Cricket Stadium, Dubai	Match tied; Pakistan won the Super Over
T20I 259	10 September	Mohammad Hafeez	George Bailey	Dubai International Cricket Stadium, Dubai	Australia by 94 runs

== September ==
=== Trinidad Quadrangular T20 ===
Pos	Team	Pld	W	L	T	NR	Pts	NRR
1	Afghanistan	3	2	1	0	0	6	0.404
2	(Bangladesh) BCB XI	3	2	1	0	0	6	0.330
3	Trinidad and Tobago	3	2	1	0	0	6	0.105
4	Barbados	3	0	3	0	0	0	−0.928

Twenty20 series
No.	Date	Team 1	Captain 1	Team 2	Captain 2	Venue	Result
Match 1	6 September	Barbados	Kirk Edwards	Bangladesh	Mushfiqur Rahim	Queen's Park Oval, Port of Spain, Trinidad	Bangladesh by 7 wickets
Match 2	6 September	Trinidad and Tobago	Rayad Emrit	Afghanistan	Nawroz Mangal	Queen's Park Oval, Port of Spain, Trinidad	Afghanistan by 3 wickets
Match 3	7 September	Afghanistan	Nawroz Mangal	Bangladesh	Mushfiqur Rahim	Queen's Park Oval, Port of Spain, Trinidad	Bangladesh by 8 wickets
Match 4	7 September	Trinidad and Tobago	Rayad Emrit	Barbados	Kirk Edwards	Queen's Park Oval, Port of Spain, Trinidad	Trinidad and Tobago by 5 wickets
Match 5	8 September	Afghanistan	Shamarh Brooks	Barbados	Kirk Edwards	Queen's Park Oval, Port of Spain, Trinidad	Afghanistan by 5 wickets
Match 6	8 September	Trinidad and Tobago	Rayad Emrit	Bangladesh	Mushfiqur Rahim	Queen's Park Oval, Port of Spain, Trinidad	Trinidad and Tobago by 4 wickets
