= International cricket in 2012–13 =

Cricket season

The 2012–13 international cricket season was from September 2012 to March 2013. It began with the ICC World Twenty20, which the West Indies won by defeating host nation Sri Lanka in the final. As a result, Sri Lanka and the West Indies rose to number one and two respectively in the ICC T20I Championship rankings. The season included the first bilateral series between India and Pakistan since 2007. Bilateral ties between the two countries had been severed since the 2008 Mumbai attacks.

In Test cricket, South Africa had their first successful defences of the ICC Test Championship number-one ranking they acquired from England in August 2012. They started with winning a three-Test series 1–0 in Australia, and won all their home matches, against New Zealand and Pakistan. England won a Test series in India for the first time since 1984–85. It was also India's first Test series defeat at home since the 2004–05 season. India then bounced back with a 4–0 victory in a home Test series against a restructuring Australian team. This was a complete turnaround from their previous meeting in 2011–12, when India lost 0–4 in Australia. In series of three or more Tests, it was also the first whitewash against Australia since 1969–70.

In the ICC ODI Championship, South Africa dropped from number two to four after a home series loss to the ninth-ranked New Zealand. South Africa were experimenting with the make-up of their ODI squad at the time. India and England lost an ODI series each to leave them ranked number one and two respectively for the second half of the season. No team was able to perform well consistently ahead of the Champions Trophy to be held the following season.

== Season overview ==
International tours
Start date	Home team	Away team	Results [Matches]		
Start date	Home team	Away team	Test	ODI	T20I
30 October 2012	Sri Lanka	New Zealand	1–1 [2]	3–0 [5]	0–0 [1]
9 November 2012	Australia	South Africa	0–1 [3]	—	—
13 November 2012	Bangladesh	West Indies	0–2 [2]	3–2 [5]	0–1 [1]
15 November 2012	India	England	1–2 [4]	3–2 [5]	1–1 [2]
14 December 2012	Australia	Sri Lanka	3–0 [3]	2–2 [5]	0–2 [2]
21 December 2012	South Africa	New Zealand	2–0 [2]	1–2 [3]	2–1 [3]
25 December 2012	India	Pakistan	—	1–2 [3]	1–1 [2]
1 February 2013	Australia	West Indies	—	5–0 [5]	0–1 [1]
1 February 2013	South Africa	Pakistan	3–0 [3]	3–2 [5]	0–1 [2]
9 February 2013	New Zealand	England	0–0 [3]	1–2 [3]	1–2 [3]
22 February 2013	India	Australia	4–0 [4]	—	—
22 February 2013	West Indies	Zimbabwe	2–0 [2]	3–0 [3]	2–0 [2]
8 March 2013	Sri Lanka	Bangladesh	1–0 [2]	1–1 [3]	1–0 [1]
International tournaments
Dates	Tournament			Winners	
18 September 2012	(Sri Lanka) ICC World Twenty20			West Indies	
Women's tours
Start date	Home team	Away team	Results [Matches]		
Start date	Home team	Away team	Test	ODI	T20I
12 December 2012	Australia	New Zealand	—	3–1 [4]	1–2 [3]
7 January 2013	South Africa	West Indies	—	2–2 [5]	0–2 [2]
22 February 2013	Sri Lanka	West Indies	—	1–2 [3]	1–4 [5]
2 April 2013	India	Bangladesh	—	3–0 [3]	3–0 [3]
Women's international tournaments
Start date	Tournament			Winners	
26 September 2012	(Sri Lanka) ICC Women's World Twenty20			Australia	
24 October 2012	(China) Women's Asia Cup			Australia	
31 January 2013	(India) ICC Women's Cricket World Cup			Australia	
Minor tours
Start date	Team 1	Team 2	Results [Matches]		
Start date	Team 1	Team 2	FC	List A	T20
29 September 2012	Namibia	Kenya	1–0 [1]	2–0 [2]	—
3 March 2013	Afghanistan	Scotland	1–0 [1]	2–0 [2]	2–0 [2]
11 March 2013	Kenya	Canada	1–0 [1]	2–0 [2]	1–1 [2]
12 March 2013	UAE	Ireland	0–0 [1]	0–2 [2]	0–1 [1]

== Pre-season rankings ==
ICC Test Championship 3 September 2012
Rank	Team	Matches	Points	Rating
1	South Africa	25	3002	120
2	England	36	4195	117
3	Australia	34	3952	116
4	Pakistan	29	3148	109
5	India	32	3394	106
6	Sri Lanka	29	2834	98
7	West Indies	28	2509	90
8	New Zealand	24	1832	76
9	Bangladesh	12	0	0

ICC ODI Championship 5 September 2012
Rank	Team	Matches	Points	Rating
1	England	25	3016	121
2	South Africa	18	2170	121
3	India	30	3598	120
4	Australia	28	3164	113
5	Sri Lanka	32	3470	108
6	Pakistan	28	2907	104
7	West Indies	20	1879	94
8	New Zealand	17	1258	74
9	Bangladesh	16	1134	71
10	Zimbabwe	14	700	50
11	Ireland	6	207	35
12	Netherlands	4	63	16
13	Kenya	4	45	11

ICC T20I Championship 26 September 2012
Rank	Team	Matches	Points	Rating
1	South Africa	15	1338	134
2	England	17	1368	124
3	India	11	927	116
4	Sri Lanka	10	802	115
5	Pakistan	22	1601	114
6	New Zealand	15	1072	107
7	Australia	16	1146	104
8	West Indies	11	712	102
9	Bangladesh	10	597	85
10	Ireland	12	659	82
11	Zimbabwe	10	306	44

- Note: Zimbabwe is currently unranked in Tests, as it has played insufficient matches. It has 167 points and a rating of 42.

== September ==
=== ICC World Twenty20 ===
==== Group stage ====
Group A
Pos	Seed	Team	Pld	W	L	NR	Pts	NRR
1	A2	India	2	2	0	0	4	2.825
2	A1	England	2	1	1	0	2	0.650
3		Afghanistan	2	0	2	0	0	−3.475

Group B
Pos	Seed	Team	Pld	W	L	NR	Pts	NRR
1	B1	Australia	2	2	0	0	4	2.184
2	B2	West Indies	2	0	1	1	1	−1.855
3		Ireland	2	0	1	1	1	−2.092

Group C
Pos	Seed	Team	Pld	W	L	NR	Pts	NRR
1	C2	South Africa	2	2	0	0	4	3.598
2	C1	Sri Lanka	2	1	1	0	2	1.852
3		Zimbabwe	2	0	2	0	0	−3.624

Group D
Pos	Seed	Team	Pld	W	L	NR	Pts	NRR
1	D1	Pakistan	2	2	0	0	4	0.706
2	D2	New Zealand	2	1	1	0	2	1.150
3		Bangladesh	2	0	2	0	0	−1.868

Group stage
No.	Date	Team 1	Captain 1	Team 2	Captain 2	Venue	Result
T20I 263	18 September	Sri Lanka	Mahela Jayawardene	Zimbabwe	Brendan Taylor	Mahinda Rajapaksa International Cricket Stadium, Hambantota	Sri Lanka by 82 runs
T20I 264	19 September	Ireland	William Porterfield	Australia	George Bailey	R. Premadasa Stadium, Colombo	Australia by 7 wickets
T20I 265	19 September	India	Mahendra Singh Dhoni	Afghanistan	Nawroz Mangal	R. Premadasa Stadium, Colombo	India by 23 runs
T20I 266	20 September	Zimbabwe	Brendan Taylor	South Africa	AB de Villiers	Mahinda Rajapaksa International Cricket Stadium, Hambantota	South Africa by 10 wickets
T20I 267	21 September	New Zealand	Ross Taylor	Bangladesh	Mushfiqur Rahim	Pallekele International Cricket Stadium, Pallekele	New Zealand by 59 runs
T20I 268	21 September	England	Stuart Broad	Afghanistan	Nawroz Mangal	R. Premadasa Stadium, Colombo	England by 116 runs
T20I 269	22 September	South Africa	AB de Villiers	Sri Lanka	Mahela Jayawardene	Mahinda Rajapaksa International Cricket Stadium, Hambantota	South Africa by 32 runs
T20I 270	22 September	West Indies	Darren Sammy	Australia	George Bailey	R. Premadasa Stadium, Colombo	Australia by 17 runs (D/L)
T20I 271	23 September	Pakistan	Mohammad Hafeez	New Zealand	Ross Taylor	Pallekele International Cricket Stadium, Pallekele	Pakistan by 13 runs
T20I 272	23 September	India	Mahendra Singh Dhoni	England	Stuart Broad	R. Premadasa Stadium, Colombo	India by 80 runs
T20I 273	24 September	Ireland	William Porterfield	West Indies	Darren Sammy	R. Premadasa Stadium, Colombo	No result
T20I 274	25 September	Bangladesh	Mushfiqur Rahim	Pakistan	Mohammad Hafeez	Pallekele International Cricket Stadium, Pallekele	Pakistan by 8 wickets

==== Super Eights ====
Group 1
Pos	Team	Pld	W	L	NR	Pts	NRR
1	Sri Lanka	3	3	0	0	6	0.998
2	West Indies	3	2	1	0	4	−0.375
3	England	3	1	2	0	2	−0.397
4	New Zealand	3	0	3	0	0	−0.169

Group 2
Pos	Team	Pld	W	L	NR	Pts	NRR
1	Australia	3	2	1	0	4	0.464
2	Pakistan	3	2	1	0	4	0.273
3	India	3	2	1	0	4	−0.274
4	South Africa	3	0	3	0	0	−0.421

Super Eights
No.	Date	Team 1	Captain 1	Team 2	Captain 2	Venue	Result
T20I 275	27 September	New Zealand	Ross Taylor	Sri Lanka	Mahela Jayawardene	Pallekele International Cricket Stadium, Pallekele	Match tied; Sri Lanka won the Super Over
T20I 276	27 September	West Indies	Darren Sammy	England	Stuart Broad	Pallekele International Cricket Stadium, Pallekele	West Indies by 15 runs
T20I 277	28 September	South Africa	AB de Villiers	Pakistan	Mohammad Hafeez	R. Premadasa Stadium, Colombo	Pakistan by 2 wickets
T20I 278	28 September	India	Mahendra Singh Dhoni	Australia	George Bailey	R. Premadasa Stadium, Colombo	Australia by 9 wickets
T20I 279	29 September	New Zealand	Ross Taylor	England	Stuart Broad	Pallekele International Cricket Stadium, Pallekele	England by 6 wickets
T20I 280	29 September	West Indies	Darren Sammy	Sri Lanka	Mahela Jayawardene	Pallekele International Cricket Stadium, Pallekele	Sri Lanka by 9 wickets
T20I 281	30 September	South Africa	AB de Villiers	Australia	George Bailey	R. Premadasa Stadium, Colombo	Australia by 8 wickets
T20I 282	30 September	Pakistan	Mohammad Hafeez	India	Mahendra Singh Dhoni	R. Premadasa Stadium, Colombo	India by 8 wickets
T20I 283	1 October	West Indies	Darren Sammy	New Zealand	Ross Taylor	Pallekele International Cricket Stadium, Pallekele	Match tied; West Indies won the Super Over
T20I 284	1 October	Sri Lanka	Kumar Sangakkara	England	Stuart Broad	Pallekele International Cricket Stadium, Pallekele	Sri Lanka by 19 runs
T20I 285	2 October	Pakistan	Mohammad Hafeez	Australia	George Bailey	R. Premadasa Stadium, Colombo	Pakistan by 32 runs
T20I 286	2 October	India	Mahendra Singh Dhoni	South Africa	AB de Villiers	R. Premadasa Stadium, Colombo	India by 1 run

==== Knockout stage ====
No.	Date	Team 1	Captain 1	Team 2	Captain 2	Venue	Result
Semi-finals
T20I 287	4 October	Sri Lanka	Mahela Jayawardene	Pakistan	Mohammad Hafeez	R. Premadasa Stadium, Colombo	Sri Lanka by 16 runs
T20I 288	5 October	West Indies	Darren Sammy	Australia	George Bailey	R. Premadasa Stadium, Colombo	West Indies by 74 runs
Final
T20I 289	7 October	West Indies	Darren Sammy	Sri Lanka	Mahela Jayawardene	R. Premadasa Stadium, Colombo	West Indies by 36 runs

=== ICC Women's World Twenty20 ===
==== Group Stage ====
Pos	Team	Pld	W	L	NR	Pts	NRR
1	England	3	3	0	0	6	1.341
2	Australia	3	2	1	0	4	0.628
3	Pakistan	3	1	2	0	2	−1.367
4	India	3	0	3	0	0	−0.607

Source: ESPNCricinfo

Pos	Team	Pld	W	L	NR	Pts	NRR
1	West Indies	3	2	1	0	4	1.602
2	New Zealand	3	2	1	0	4	0.638
3	Sri Lanka	3	1	2	0	2	−0.692
4	South Africa	3	1	2	0	2	−1.194

Source: ESPNCricinfo

Group Stage
No.	Date	Group	Team 1	Captain 1	Team 2	Captain 2	Venue	Result
WT20I 166	26 September	B	Sri Lanka	Shashikala Siriwardene	South Africa	Mignon du Preez	Galle International Stadium, Galle	South Africa by 6 wickets
WT20I 167	26 September	B	New Zealand	Suzie Bates	West Indies	Merissa Aguilleira	Galle International Stadium, Galle	West Indies by 7 wickets
WT20I 168	27 September	A	England	Charlotte Edwards	Pakistan	Sana Mir	Galle International Stadium, Galle	England by 43 runs
WT20I 169	27 September	A	India	Mithali Raj	Australia	Jodie Fields	Galle International Stadium, Galle	Australia by 8 wickets
WT20I 170	28 September	B	New Zealand	Suzie Bates	South Africa	Mignon du Preez	Galle International Stadium, Galle	New Zealand by 22 runs
WT20I 171	28 September	B	Sri Lanka	Shashikala Siriwardene	West Indies	Merissa Aguilleira	Galle International Stadium, Galle	Sri Lanka won by 5 runs (D/L)
WT20I 172	29 September	A	Australia	Jodie Fields	Pakistan	Sana Mir	Galle International Stadium, Galle	Australia by 25 runs (D/L)
WT20I 173	29 September	A	India	Mithali Raj	England	Charlotte Edwards	Galle International Stadium, Galle	England by 9 wickets
WT20I 174	30 September	B	South Africa	Mignon du Preez	West Indies	Merissa Aguilleira	Galle International Stadium, Galle	West Indies by 10 wickets
WT20I 175	30 September	B	Sri Lanka	Shashikala Siriwardene	New Zealand	Suzie Bates	Galle International Stadium, Galle	New Zealand won by 8 wickets
WT20I 176	1 October	A	India	Mithali Raj	Pakistan	Sana Mir	Galle International Stadium, Galle	Pakistan by 1 run
WT20I 177	1 October	A	Australia	Jodie Fields	England	Charlotte Edwards	Galle International Stadium, Galle	England by 7 wickets

==== Play-offs ====
Qualification Play-offs
No.	Date	Team 1	Captain 1	Team 2	Captain 2	Venue	Result
WT20I 179	3 October	Pakistan	Sana Mir	South Africa	Mignon du Preez	Galle International Stadium, Galle	South Africa by 5 wickets
WT20I 178	3 October	India	Mithali Raj	Sri Lanka	Shashikala Siriwardene	Galle International Stadium, Galle	India by 9 wickets

Knockout stage
No.	Date	Team 1	Captain 1	Team 2	Captain 2	Venue	Result
Semi-finals
WT20I 180	4 October	New Zealand	Suzie Bates	England	Charlotte Edwards	Galle International Stadium, Galle	England by 9 wickets
WT20I 181	5 October	Australia	Jodie Fields	West Indies	Merissa Aguilleira	Galle International Stadium, Galle	Australia by 28 runs
Final
WT20I 182	7 October	England	Charlotte Edwards	Australia	Jodie Fields	Galle International Stadium, Galle	Australia by 4 runs

===== Final Placings =====
Pos	Team	Status
1	Australia	Champion
2	England	Runner-Up
3	West Indies	Eliminated in semi-final
4	New Zealand	Eliminated in semi-final
5	South Africa	Eliminated in Group stage
6	India	Eliminated in Group stage
7	Pakistan	Eliminated in Group stage
8	Sri Lanka	Eliminated in Group stage

=== Kenya in Namibia ===
2011–13 ICC Intercontinental Cup
No.	Date	Home captain	Away captain	Venue	Result
First-class	29 September–2 October	Sarel Burger	Collins Obuya	United Cricket Club Ground, Windhoek	Namibia by an innings and 1 run
2011–13 ICC World Cricket League Championship
No.	Date	Home captain	Away captain	Venue	Result
List A	4 October	Sarel Burger	Collins Obuya	United Cricket Club Ground, Windhoek	Namibia by 6 wickets
List A	6 October	Sarel Burger	Collins Obuya	United Cricket Club Ground, Windhoek	Namibia by 7 wickets

== October ==
=== New Zealand in Sri Lanka ===
Only T20I
No.	Date	Home captain	Away captain	Venue	Result
T20I 290	30 October	Angelo Mathews	Ross Taylor	Pallekele International Cricket Stadium, Pallekele	No result
ODI series
No.	Date	Home captain	Away captain	Venue	Result
ODI 3304a	1 November	Mahela Jayawardene	Ross Taylor	Pallekele International Cricket Stadium, Pallekele	No result
ODI 3305	4 November	Mahela Jayawardene	Ross Taylor	Pallekele International Cricket Stadium, Pallekele	Sri Lanka by 14 runs (D/L)
ODI 3306	6 November	Mahela Jayawardene	Ross Taylor	Pallekele International Cricket Stadium, Pallekele	Sri Lanka by 7 wickets (D/L)
ODI 3307	10 November	Mahela Jayawardene	Ross Taylor	Mahinda Rajapaksa International Cricket Stadium, Hambantota	Sri Lanka by 7 wickets (D/L)
ODI 3308	12 November	Mahela Jayawardene	Ross Taylor	Mahinda Rajapaksa International Cricket Stadium, Hambantota	No result
Test series
No.	Date	Home captain	Away captain	Venue	Result
Test 2059	17–21 November	Mahela Jayawardene	Ross Taylor	Galle International Stadium, Galle	Sri Lanka by 10 wickets
Test 2063	25–29 November	Mahela Jayawardene	Ross Taylor	P. Saravanamuttu Stadium, Colombo	New Zealand by 167 runs

== November ==
=== South Africa in Australia ===
Test series
No.	Date	Home captain	Away captain	Venue	Result
Test 2056	9–13 November	Michael Clarke	Graeme Smith	The Gabba, Brisbane	Match drawn
Test 2061	22–26 November	Michael Clarke	Graeme Smith	Adelaide Oval, Adelaide	Match drawn
Test 2064	30 November–4 December	Michael Clarke	Graeme Smith	WACA Ground, Perth	South Africa by 309 runs

=== West Indies in Bangladesh ===
Test series
No.	Date	Home captain	Away captain	Venue	Result
Test 2057	13–17 November	Mushfiqur Rahim	Darren Sammy	Shere Bangla National Stadium, Mirpur	West Indies by 77 runs
Test 2060	21–25 November	Mushfiqur Rahim	Darren Sammy	Sheikh Abu Naser Stadium, Khulna	West Indies by 10 wickets
ODI series
No.	Date	Home captain	Away captain	Venue	Result
ODI 3309	30 November	Mushfiqur Rahim	Darren Sammy	Sheikh Abu Naser Stadium, Khulna	Bangladesh by 7 wickets
ODI 3310	2 December	Mushfiqur Rahim	Darren Sammy	Sheikh Abu Naser Stadium, Khulna	Bangladesh by 160 runs
ODI 3311	5 December	Mushfiqur Rahim	Darren Sammy	Shere Bangla National Stadium, Mirpur	West Indies by 4 wickets
ODI 3312	7 December	Mushfiqur Rahim	Darren Sammy	Shere Bangla National Stadium, Mirpur	West Indies by 75 runs
ODI 3313	8 December	Mushfiqur Rahim	Darren Sammy	Shere Bangla National Stadium, Mirpur	Bangladesh by 2 wickets
Only T20I
No.	Date	Home captain	Away captain	Venue	Result
T20I 291	10 December	Mushfiqur Rahim	Darren Sammy	Shere Bangla National Stadium, Mirpur	West Indies by 18 runs

=== England in India ===
Test series
No.	Date	Home captain	Away captain	Venue	Result
Test 2058	15–19 November	Mahendra Singh Dhoni	Alastair Cook	Sardar Patel Stadium, Ahmedabad	India by 9 wickets
Test 2062	23–27 November	Mahendra Singh Dhoni	Alastair Cook	Wankhede Stadium, Mumbai	England by 10 wickets
Test 2065	5–9 December	Mahendra Singh Dhoni	Alastair Cook	Eden Gardens, Kolkata	England by 7 wickets
Test 2066	13–17 December	Mahendra Singh Dhoni	Alastair Cook	Vidarbha Cricket Association Stadium, Nagpur	Match drawn
T20I series
No.	Date	Home captain	Away captain	Venue	Result
T20I 292	20 December	Mahendra Singh Dhoni	Eoin Morgan	Subrata Roy Sahara Stadium, Pune	India by 5 wickets
T20I 294	22 December	Mahendra Singh Dhoni	Eoin Morgan	Wankhede Stadium, Mumbai	England by 6 wickets
ODI series
No.	Date	Home captain	Away captain	Venue	Result
ODI 3318	11 January	Mahendra Singh Dhoni	Alastair Cook	Saurashtra Cricket Association Stadium, Rajkot	England by 9 runs
ODI 3320	15 January	Mahendra Singh Dhoni	Alastair Cook	Nehru Stadium, Kochi	India by 127 runs
ODI 3322	19 January	Mahendra Singh Dhoni	Alastair Cook	JSCA International Stadium Complex, Ranchi	India by 7 wickets
ODI 3327	23 January	Mahendra Singh Dhoni	Alastair Cook	Punjab Cricket Association Stadium, Mohali	India by 5 wickets
ODI 3329	27 January	Mahendra Singh Dhoni	Alastair Cook	Himachal Pradesh Cricket Association Stadium, Dharamsala	England by 7 wickets

== December ==
=== New Zealand women in Australia ===
WODI series
No.	Date	Home captain	Away captain	Venue	Result
WODI 836	12 December	Jodie Fields	Suzie Bates	Sydney Cricket Ground, Sydney	New Zealand by 8 wickets
WODI 837	14 December	Jodie Fields	Suzie Bates	North Sydney Oval, Sydney	Australia by 4 wickets
WODI 838	17 December	Jodie Fields	Suzie Bates	North Sydney Oval, Sydney	Australia by 9 wickets
WODI 839	19 December	Jodie Fields	Suzie Bates	North Sydney Oval, Sydney	Australia by 7 runs
T20I series
No.	Date	Home captain	Away captain	Venue	Result
WT20I 189	20 January	Jodie Fields	Suzie Bates	Junction Oval, Melbourne	New Zealand by 6 wickets
WT20I 190	22 January	Jodie Fields	Suzie Bates	Junction Oval, Melbourne	Australia by 4 wickets
WT20I 191	24 January	Jodie Fields	Suzie Bates	Junction Oval, Melbourne	New Zealand by 7 wickets

=== Sri Lanka in Australia ===
Test series
No.	Date	Home captain	Away captain	Venue	Result
Test 2067	14–18 December	Michael Clarke	Mahela Jayawardene	Bellerive Oval, Hobart	Australia by 137 runs
Test 2068	26–30 December	Michael Clarke	Mahela Jayawardene	Melbourne Cricket Ground, Melbourne	Australia by an innings and 201 runs
Test 2070	3–7 January	Michael Clarke	Mahela Jayawardene	Sydney Cricket Ground, Sydney	Australia by 5 wickets
ODI series
No.	Date	Home captain	Away captain	Venue	Result
ODI 3317	11 January	George Bailey	Mahela Jayawardene	Melbourne Cricket Ground, Melbourne	Australia by 107 runs
ODI 3319	13 January	George Bailey	Mahela Jayawardene	Adelaide Oval, Adelaide	Sri Lanka by 8 wickets
ODI 3321	18 January	Michael Clarke	Mahela Jayawardene	The Gabba, Brisbane	Sri Lanka by 4 wickets
ODI 3324	20 January	Michael Clarke	Mahela Jayawardene	Sydney Cricket Ground, Sydney	No result
ODI 3326	23 January	Michael Clarke	Mahela Jayawardene	Bellerive Oval, Hobart	Australia by 32 runs
T20I series
No.	Date	Home captain	Away captain	Venue	Result
T20I 299	26 January	George Bailey	Angelo Mathews	Stadium Australia, Sydney	Sri Lanka by 5 wickets
T20I 300	28 January	George Bailey	Angelo Mathews	Melbourne Cricket Ground, Melbourne	Sri Lanka by 2 runs (D/L)

=== New Zealand in South Africa ===
T20I series
No.	Date	Home captain	Away captain	Venue	Result
T20I 293	21 December	Faf du Plessis	Brendon McCullum	Kingsmead, Durban	South Africa by 8 wickets
T20I 295	23 December	Faf du Plessis	Brendon McCullum	Buffalo Park, East London	New Zealand by 8 wickets
T20I 297	26 December	Faf du Plessis	Brendon McCullum	St George's Park, Port Elizabeth	South Africa by 33 runs
Test series
No.	Date	Home captain	Away captain	Venue	Result
Test 2069	2–6 January	Graeme Smith	Brendon McCullum	Newlands, Cape Town	South Africa by an innings and 27 runs
Test 2071	11–15 January	Graeme Smith	Brendon McCullum	St George's Park, Port Elizabeth	South Africa by an innings and 193 runs
ODI series
No.	Date	Home captain	Away captain	Venue	Result
ODI 3323	19 January	AB de Villiers	Brendon McCullum	Boland Park, Paarl	New Zealand by 1 wicket
ODI 3325	22 January	Faf du Plessis	Brendon McCullum	De Beers Diamond Oval, Kimberley	New Zealand by 27 runs
ODI 3328	25 January	Faf du Plessis	Brendon McCullum	Senwes Park, Potchefstroom	South Africa by 1 wicket

=== Pakistan in India ===
T20I series
No.	Date	Home captain	Away captain	Venue	Result
T20I 296	25 December	Mahendra Singh Dhoni	Mohammad Hafeez	M. Chinnaswamy Stadium, Bangalore	Pakistan by 5 wickets
T20I 298	28 December	Mahendra Singh Dhoni	Mohammad Hafeez	Sardar Patel Stadium, Ahmedabad	India by 11 runs
ODI series
No.	Date	Home captain	Away captain	Venue	Result
ODI 3314	30 December	Mahendra Singh Dhoni	Misbah-ul-Haq	M. A. Chidambaram Stadium, Chennai	Pakistan by 6 wickets
ODI 3315	3 January	Mahendra Singh Dhoni	Misbah-ul-Haq	Eden Gardens, Kolkata	Pakistan by 85 runs
ODI 3316	6 January	Mahendra Singh Dhoni	Misbah-ul-Haq	Feroz Shah Kotla Ground, Delhi	India by 10 runs

== February ==
=== West Indies in Australia ===
ODI series
No.	Date	Home captain	Away captain	Venue	Result
ODI 3330	1 February	Michael Clarke	Darren Sammy	WACA Ground, Perth	Australia by 9 wickets
ODI 3331	3 February	Michael Clarke	Darren Sammy	WACA Ground, Perth	Australia by 54 runs
ODI 3332	6 February	Michael Clarke	Darren Sammy	Manuka Oval, Canberra	Australia by 39 runs
ODI 3333	8 February	Michael Clarke	Darren Sammy	Sydney Cricket Ground, Sydney	Australia by 5 wickets
ODI 3334	10 February	Shane Watson	Darren Sammy	Melbourne Cricket Ground, Melbourne	Australia by 17 runs
Only T20I
No.	Date	Home captain	Away captain	Venue	Result
T20I 303	13 February	George Bailey	Darren Sammy	The Gabba, Brisbane	West Indies by 27 runs

=== Pakistan in South Africa ===
Test series
No.	Date	Home captain	Away captain	Venue	Result
Test 2072	1–5 February	Graeme Smith	Misbah-ul-Haq	New Wanderers Stadium, Johannesburg	South Africa by 211 runs
Test 2073	14–18 February	Graeme Smith	Misbah-ul-Haq	Newlands, Cape Town	South Africa by 4 wickets
Test 2075	22–26 February	Graeme Smith	Misbah-ul-Haq	SuperSport Park, Centurion	South Africa by an innings and 18 runs
T20I series
No.	Date	Home captain	Away captain	Venue	Result
T20I 304a	1 March	Faf du Plessis	Mohammad Hafeez	Kingsmead, Durban	No result
T20I 306	3 March	Faf du Plessis	Mohammad Hafeez	SuperSport Park, Centurion	Pakistan by 95 runs
ODI series
No.	Date	Home captain	Away captain	Venue	Result
ODI 3343	10 March	AB de Villiers	Misbah-ul-Haq	Chevrolet Park, Bloemfontein	South Africa by 125 runs
ODI 3346	15 March	AB de Villiers	Misbah-ul-Haq	SuperSport Park, Centurion	Pakistan by 6 wickets (D/L)
ODI 3347	17 March	AB de Villiers	Misbah-ul-Haq	New Wanderers Stadium, Johannesburg	South Africa by 34 runs
ODI 3348	21 March	AB de Villiers	Misbah-ul-Haq	Kingsmead, Durban	Pakistan by 3 wickets
ODI 3350	24 March	AB de Villiers	Misbah-ul-Haq	Willowmoore Park, Benoni	South Africa by 6 wickets

=== England in New Zealand ===
T20I series
No.	Date	Home captain	Away captain	Venue	Result
T20I 301	9 February	Brendon McCullum	Stuart Broad	Eden Park, Auckland	England by 40 runs
T20I 302	12 February	Brendon McCullum	Stuart Broad	Seddon Park, Hamilton	New Zealand by 55 runs
T20I 304	15 February	Brendon McCullum	Stuart Broad	Westpac Stadium, Wellington	England by 10 wickets
ODI series
No.	Date	Home captain	Away captain	Venue	Result
ODI 3335	17 February	Brendon McCullum	Alastair Cook	Seddon Park, Hamilton	New Zealand by 3 wickets
ODI 3336	20 February	Brendon McCullum	Alastair Cook	McLean Park, Napier	England by 8 wickets
ODI 3338	23 February	Brendon McCullum	Alastair Cook	Eden Park, Auckland	England by 5 wickets
Test series
No.	Date	Home captain	Away captain	Venue	Result
Test 2077	6–10 March	Brendon McCullum	Alastair Cook	University Oval, Dunedin	Match drawn
Test 2080	14–18 March	Brendon McCullum	Alastair Cook	Basin Reserve, Wellington	Match drawn
Test 2084	22–26 March	Brendon McCullum	Alastair Cook	Eden Park, Auckland	Match drawn

=== Australia in India ===
Test series
No.	Date	Home captain	Away captain	Venue	Result
Test 2074	22–26 February	Mahendra Singh Dhoni	Michael Clarke	M. A. Chidambaram Stadium, Chennai	India by 8 wickets
Test 2076	2–6 March	Mahendra Singh Dhoni	Michael Clarke	Rajiv Gandhi International Cricket Stadium, Hyderabad	India by an innings and 135 runs
Test 2081	14–18 March	Mahendra Singh Dhoni	Michael Clarke	I. S. Bindra Stadium, Mohali	India by 6 wickets
Test 2085	22–26 March	Mahendra Singh Dhoni	Shane Watson	Feroz Shah Kotla Ground, Delhi	India by 6 wickets

=== Zimbabwe in the West Indies ===
ODI series
No.	Date	Home captain	Away captain	Venue	Result
ODI 3337	22 February	Dwayne Bravo	Brendan Taylor	National Cricket Stadium, St George's, Grenada	West Indies by 156 runs
ODI 3339	24 February	Dwayne Bravo	Brendan Taylor	National Cricket Stadium, St George's, Grenada	West Indies by 7 wickets
ODI 3340	26 February	Dwayne Bravo	Brendan Taylor	National Cricket Stadium, St George's, Grenada	West Indies by 5 wickets
T20I series
No.	Date	Home captain	Away captain	Venue	Result
T20I 305	2 March	Darren Sammy	Brendan Taylor	Sir Vivian Richards Stadium, North Sound, Antigua	West Indies by 8 wickets
T20I 308	3 March	Darren Sammy	Brendan Taylor	Sir Vivian Richards Stadium, North Sound, Antigua	West Indies by 41 runs
Test series
No.	Date	Home captain	Away captain	Venue	Result
Test 2079	12–16 March	Darren Sammy	Brendan Taylor	Kensington Oval, Bridgetown, Barbados	West Indies by 9 wickets
Test 2083	20–24 March	Darren Sammy	Brendan Taylor	Windsor Park, Roseau, Dominica	West Indies by an innings and 65 runs

== March ==
=== Afghanistan vs Scotland in the United Arab Emirates ===
T20I series
No.	Date	Afghanistan captain	Scotland captain	Venue	Result
T20I 307	3 March	Mohammad Nabi	Gordon Drummond	Sharjah Cricket Stadium, Sharjah	Afghanistan by 27 runs
T20I 309	4 March	Mohammad Nabi	Gordon Drummond	Sharjah Cricket Stadium, Sharjah	Afghanistan by 7 wickets
2011–13 ICC World Cricket League Championship
No.	Date	Afghanistan captain	Scotland captain	Venue	Result
ODI 3341	6 March	Mohammad Nabi	Gordon Drummond	Sharjah Cricket Stadium, Sharjah	Afghanistan by 7 wickets
ODI 3342	8 March	Mohammad Nabi	Gordon Drummond	Sharjah Cricket Stadium, Sharjah	Afghanistan by 5 wickets
2011–13 ICC Intercontinental Cup
No.	Date	Afghanistan captain	Scotland captain	Venue	Result
First-class	12–15 March	Mohammad Nabi	Gordon Drummond	Sheikh Zayed Stadium, Abu Dhabi	Afghanistan by an innings and 5 runs

=== Bangladesh in Sri Lanka ===
Test series
No.	Date	Home captain	Away captain	Venue	Result
Test 2078	8–12 March	Angelo Mathews	Mushfiqur Rahim	Galle International Stadium, Galle	Match drawn
Test 2082	16–20 March	Angelo Mathews	Mushfiqur Rahim	R. Premadasa Stadium, Colombo	Sri Lanka by 7 wickets
ODI series
No.	Date	Home captain	Away captain	Venue	Result
ODI 3349	23 March	Angelo Mathews	Mushfiqur Rahim	Mahinda Rajapaksa International Cricket Stadium, Hambantota	Sri Lanka by 8 wickets (D/L)
ODI 3351	25 March	Angelo Mathews	Mushfiqur Rahim	Mahinda Rajapaksa International Cricket Stadium, Hambantota	No result
ODI 3352	28 March	Angelo Mathews	Mushfiqur Rahim	Pallekele International Cricket Stadium, Pallekele	Bangladesh by 3 wickets (D/L)
Only T20I
No.	Date	Home captain	Away captain	Venue	Result
T20I 312	31 March	Dinesh Chandimal	Mushfiqur Rahim	Pallekele International Cricket Stadium, Pallekele	Sri Lanka by 17 runs

=== Kenya vs Canada in the United Arab Emirates ===
2011–13 ICC World Cricket League Championship
No.	Date	Kenya captain	Canada captain	Venue	Result
ODI 3344	11 March	Collins Obuya	Rizwan Cheema	ICC Global Cricket Academy, Dubai	Kenya by 6 wickets
ODI 3345	13 March	Collins Obuya	Rizwan Cheema	ICC Global Cricket Academy, Dubai	Kenya by 6 wickets
T20I series
No.	Date	Kenya captain	Canada captain	Venue	Result
T20I 310	15 March	Collins Obuya	Rizwan Cheema	ICC Global Cricket Academy, Dubai	Canada by 5 wickets
T20I 311	16 March	Collins Obuya	Rizwan Cheema	ICC Global Cricket Academy, Dubai	Kenya by 21 runs
2011–13 ICC Intercontinental Cup
No.	Date	Kenya captain	Canada captain	Venue	Result
First-class	18–21 March	Collins Obuya	Jimmy Hansra	ICC Global Cricket Academy, Dubai	Kenya by 4 wickets

=== Ireland in the United Arab Emirates ===
2011–13 ICC Intercontinental Cup
No.	Date	Home captain	Away captain	Venue	Result
First-class	12–15 March	Khurram Khan	William Porterfield	Sharjah Cricket Stadium, Sharjah	Match drawn
2011–13 ICC World Cricket League Championship
No.	Date	Home captain	Away captain	Venue	Result
List A	18 March	Khurram Khan	William Porterfield	Sharjah Cricket Stadium, Sharjah	Ireland by 5 wickets
List A	20 March	Khurram Khan	William Porterfield	Sharjah Cricket Stadium, Sharjah	Ireland by 6 wickets
Only T20
No.	Date	Home captain	Away captain	Venue	Result
Twenty20	21 March	Ahmed Raza	William Porterfield	Sharjah Cricket Stadium, Sharjah	Ireland by 6 wickets
