= 1970–71 Vehicle & General Australasian knock-out competition =

1970–71 V & G Australasian Knock-Out Competition
- Administrator: Australian Cricket Board
- Cricket format: Limited overs cricket
- Tournament format: knockout
- Champions: Western Australia (1st title)
- Participants: 7
- Matches: 6
- Attendance: 35,010 (5,835 per match)
- Most runs: Ian Chappell (SA) (176 runs)
- Most wickets: Graham McKenzie (WA) (8 wickets)

The 1970–71 Vehicle & General Australasian knock-out competition was the second edition of the official List A domestic tournament in Australia. Seven teams representing six states in Australia and New Zealand took part in the knock-out competition. The competition began on 18 October 1970 when South Australia took on Victoria at the Adelaide Oval.

The 1970–71 cup final was played on 6 February 1971 at the Melbourne Cricket Ground between Queensland and Western Australia, with Western Australia recording an 91 run victory over Queensland. Ian Chappell scored the most runs in the tournament with 176 runs with Graham McKenzie from Western Australia taking the most wickets with eight.

== Format ==
The second season of the competition was a straight knockout competition between the six states of Australia and a team that represented New Zealand at the domestic level.

First Round
18 October – Adelaide
South Australia	5/202
Victoria	9/199
1 November – Brisbane
Queensland	3/156
New South Wales	155
4 December – Launceston
Tasmania	205
Western Australia	8/218
New Zealand
BYE

Semi-finals
6 December – Adelaide
South Australia	6/261
Queensland	6/264
31 January – Perth
Western Australia	123/7
New Zealand	120

Final
6 February – Melbourne
Queensland	79
Western Australia	170

== Fixtures ==
=== First round ===
18 October 1970
Scorecard

Victoria; 9/199 (40 overs)	v	South Australia; 5/202 (36.5 overs)
Robert Rowan 47 (?); Kevin McCarthy 2/28 (8 overs)		Ian Chappell 93* (?); Graeme Watson 2/28 (7 overs)

South Australia won by 5 wickets
Adelaide Oval, Adelaide
Attendance: 6,921
Player of the match: Ian Chappell (SA)

- Victoria won the toss and elected to field.

1 November 1970
Scorecard

New South Wales; 155 (37.2 overs)	v	Queensland; 3/156 (33.5 overs)
John Gleeson 32 (57); Rusi Surti 4/29 (6.2 overs)		Ian Seib 64* (146); Doug Walters 2/41 (8 overs)

Queensland won by 7 wickets
The Gabba, Brisbane
Attendance: 4,513
Player of the match: Rusi Surti (Qld)

- Queensland won the toss and elected to field.

4 November 1970
Scorecard

Western Australia; 8/218 (40 overs)	v	Tasmania; 205 (39 overs)
Jock Irvine 50 (?); Billy Ibadulla 2/28 (8 overs)		Brian Cartledge 56 (?); Graham McKenzie 2/23 (8 overs)

Western Australia won by 13 runs
NTCA Ground, Launceston
Attendance: 2,000
Player of the match: Ross Edwards (WA)

- Western Australia won the toss and elected to bat.

=== Semi-finals ===
6 December 1970
Scorecard

South Australia; 6/261 (40 overs)	v	Queensland; 6/264 (39 overs)
Barry Richards 89 (128); Tony Dell 2/42 (8 overs)		Tom Graveney 98 (112); Ken Cunningham 2/58 (5.5 overs)

Queensland won by 4 wickets
Adelaide Oval, Adelaide
Attendance: 11,303
Player of the match: Tom Graveney (QLD)

- Queensland won the toss and elected to field.

31 January 1971
Scorecard

New Zealand; 120 (35.1 overs)	v	Western Australia; 7/123 (35.7 overs)
Ken Wadsworth 40 (?); Sam Gannon 4/21 (8 overs)		John Inverarity 53* (?); Richard Collinge 2/10 (8 overs)

Western Australia won by 3 wickets
WACA Ground, Perth
Attendance: 4,678
Player of the match: John Inverarity (WA)

- New Zealand won the toss and elected to bat.

=== Final ===
6 February 1971
Scorecard

Western Australia; 170 (38.2 overs)	v	Queensland; 79 (23.5 overs)
John Inverarity 90 (153); Tony Dell 2/18 (7.2 overs)		Phil Carson 23 (45); Graham McKenzie 4/13 (6.5 overs)

Western Australia won by 91 runs
Melbourne Cricket Ground, Melbourne
Attendance: 5,595
Player of the match: John Inverarity (WA)

- Queensland won the toss and elected to field.

== See also ==
- 1970-71 Sheffield Shield season
