= Robert Rowan =

Robert Rowan may refer to:

- Robert Rowan (priest) (1870–1946), Irish Anglican priest
- Robert Rowan (cricketer) (born 1947), Australian cricketer
- Robert A. Rowan (1935–2021), member of the Georgia State Senate
- SS Robert Rowan, an American Liberty ship built in 1943
