= 1975–76 Gillette Cup =

1975–76 Gillette Cup may refer to any of three domestic one-day cricket competitions:

- 1975–76 Gillette Cup (Australia)
- 1975–76 Gillette Cup (South Africa)
- 1975–76 Gillette Cup (West Indies)
