= Kevin Brown (cricketer) =

Australian cricketer (born 1941)

Personal information
- Born: 1 July 1941 (age 85); Devonport, Tasmania, Australia

Domestic team information
- Years: Team
- 1965-1970: Tasmania
- Source: Cricinfo, 13 March 2016

Kevin Brown (born 1 July 1941) is an Australian former cricketer. He played six first-class matches for Tasmania between 1965 and 1970.

Brown faced the first ball in the first-ever List A cricket match in Australia, the opening match of the Vehicle & General Australasian Knock-out Competition between Tasmania and Victoria on 22 November 1969 at the Melbourne Cricket Ground. The bowler was Alan Thomson. Brown made 14.

== See also ==
- List of Tasmanian representative cricketers
