= 1969–70 Sheffield Shield season =

Australian cricket tournament

- Cricket format: First-class
- Tournament format: Double round-robin
- Champions: Victoria (21st title)
- Participants: 5
- Matches: 20
- Most runs: Greg Chappell (South Australia) (856)
- Most wickets: Alan Thomson, (Victoria) (49)

The 1969–70 Sheffield Shield season was the 68th season of the Sheffield Shield, the domestic first-class cricket competition of Australia. Victoria won the championship.

== Table ==
Team	Played	Won	1st Inns Won	Drawn	1st Inns Lost	Lost	Points
Victoria	8	4	1	0	2	1	48
Western Australia	8	3	2	0	3	0	38
New South Wales	8	2	1	0	1	4	24
Queensland	8	2	2	0	0	4	24
South Australia	8	2	1	0	1	4	24

== Statistics ==
=== Most runs ===
Greg Chappell, 856

=== Most wickets ===
Alan Thomson, 49
