= 1971–72 Coca-Cola Australasian knock-out competition =

- Administrator: Australian Cricket Board
- Cricket format: Limited overs cricket
- Tournament format: knockout
- Champions: Victoria (1st title)
- Participants: 7
- Matches: 6
- Most runs: Graeme Watson (WA) (194 runs)
- Most wickets: Jim Higgs (VIC) (7 wickets)

The 1971–72 Vehicle & General Australasian knock-out competition was the third edition of the officical List A domestic tournament in Australia. Seven teams representing six states in Australia and New Zealand took part in the knock-out competition. The competition began on 14 November 1971 when South Australia took on Tasmania at the Adelaide Oval.

The 1971–72 cup final was played on 6 February 1972 at the Adelaide Oval between Victoria and South Australia, with Victoria recording an 8 wicket victory over South Australia. Western Australia batsman, Graeme Watson scored the most runs in the tournament with 194 runs. Victorian bowler, Jim Higgs was the leading wicket taker with seven wickets from three games.
