= Richard Drewer =

Australian cricketer

Rick Drewer
Personal information
- Full name: Richard Harris Drewer
- Born: 12 June 1946 (age 80); Adelaide, Australia
- Batting: Left-handed
- Role: Batsman

Domestic team information
- Years: Team
- 1974/75-1975/76: South Australia

Career statistics
Competition	First-class	List A
Matches	14	2
Runs scored	659	49
Batting average	26.36	24.50
100s/50s	-/7	-/-
Top score	90	39
Catches/stumpings	12/-	-/-
- Source: Cricinfo, 31 October 2018

Richard Harris Drewer (born 12 June 1946) is an Australian cricketer. He played fourteen first-class matches and two List A matches for South Australia between 1974 and 1976.

Nicknamed "Stumpy", Drewer attended Scotch College, and spent many years playing South Australian district cricket for Sturt, Adelaide University and Adelaide cricket clubs, before making his debut for South Australia on 13 December 1974, against Queensland at Adelaide Oval, scoring 90 and eight.

Drewer, who was a DJ who played private parties under the name SWORD (an acronym for "The Swinging World of Rick Drewer"), was known for wearing his shirt unbuttoned to the waist and his uproarious laugh and quickly became a popular member of the South Australian team.

Drewer also received support from influential local sports reporter Alan Shiell, who argued that Drewer was, along with Ashley Woodcock, the best opening batsmen South Australia had. While South Australia won the Sheffield Shield in 1975/76, Drewer played poorly, averaging only 15.70 from five matches, including scores of 0, 0, 0 and five against Western Australia, falling to Dennis Lillee each time.

When South Australian captain Ian Chappell learnt that selectors had dropped Drewer from the squad to play New South Wales and Queensland without consulting Chappell, he threatened strike action.

In 2019 The Advertiser named Drewer as an opener in Scotch College's Greatest Ever Team.

== See also ==
- List of South Australian representative cricketers

== Sources ==
- Kitto, D. The Allrounder, Adelaide Cricket Club Newsletter, Edition 5: Number 1, 2003/2004.
- Manning, G. (2018) "Reviewed", Between Wickets, Summer and Winter 2018–19, Mansfield Publishing: Sydney. ISSN 2202-9397
- Nicholls, B. (2015) The Establishment Boys, New Holland Publishers: Sydney. ISBN 9781742577067
- Page, R. (1984) South Australian Cricketers 1877 - 1984, Association of Cricket Statisticians and Historians: Retford, Nottinghamshire.
- Sexton, M. (2017) Chappell's Last Stand, Affirm Press: Melbourne. ISBN 9781925584424
