= International cricket in 1969–70 =

International cricket season

The 1969–70 international cricket season was from September 1969 to April 1970.

== Season overview ==
International tours
Start date	Home team	Away team	Results [Matches]			
Start date	Home team	Away team	Test	ODI	FC	LA
25 September 1969	India	New Zealand	1–1 [3]	—	—	—
24 October 1969	Pakistan	New Zealand	0–1 [3]	—	—	—
4 November 1969	India	Australia	3–1 [5]	—	—	—
22 January 1970	South Africa	Australia	4–0 [4]	—	—	—
International tournaments
Start date	Tournament				Winners	
22 November 1969	(Australia) 1969–70 Australasian knock-out competition				New Zealand	

== September ==
=== New Zealand in India ===
Test series
No.	Date	Home captain	Away captain	Venue	Result
Test 659	25–30 September	Mansoor Ali Khan Pataudi	Graham Dowling	Brabourne Stadium, Bombay	India by 60 runs
Test 660	3–8 October	Mansoor Ali Khan Pataudi	Graham Dowling	Vidarbha Cricket Association Ground, Nagpur	New Zealand by 167 runs
Test 661	15–20 October	Mansoor Ali Khan Pataudi	Graham Dowling	Lal Bahadur Shastri Stadium, Hyderabad	Match drawn

== October ==
=== New Zealand in Pakistan ===
Test series
No.	Date	Home captain	Away captain	Venue	Result
Test 662	24–27 October	Intikhab Alam	Graham Dowling	National Stadium, Karachi	Match drawn
Test 663	30 Oct–2 November	Intikhab Alam	Graham Dowling	Gaddafi Stadium, Lahore	New Zealand by 5 wickets
Test 665	8–11 November	Intikhab Alam	Graham Dowling	Dacca Stadium, Dacca	Match drawn

== November ==
=== Australia in India ===
Test series
No.	Date	Home captain	Away captain	Venue	Result
Test 664	4–9 November	Mansoor Ali Khan Pataudi	Bill Lawry	Brabourne Stadium, Bombay	Australia by 8 wickets
Test 666	15–20 November	Mansoor Ali Khan Pataudi	Bill Lawry	Green Park, Kanpur	Match drawn
Test 667	28 Nov–2 December	Mansoor Ali Khan Pataudi	Bill Lawry	Feroz Shah Kotla Ground, Delhi	India by 7 wickets
Test 668	12–16 December	Mansoor Ali Khan Pataudi	Bill Lawry	Eden Gardens, Calcutta	Australia by 10 wickets
Test 669	24–28 December	Mansoor Ali Khan Pataudi	Bill Lawry	Madras Cricket Club Ground, Madras	Australia by 77 runs

== January ==
=== Australia in South Africa ===
Test series
No.	Date	Home captain	Away captain	Venue	Result
Test 670	22–27 January	Ali Bacher	Bill Lawry	Newlands, Cape Town	South Africa by 170 runs
Test 671	5–9 February	Ali Bacher	Bill Lawry	Kingsmead, Durban	South Africa by an innings and 129 runs
Test 672	19–24 February	Ali Bacher	Bill Lawry	New Wanderers Stadium, Johannesburg	South Africa by 307 runs
Test 673	5–10 March	Ali Bacher	Bill Lawry	St George's Park, Port Elizabeth	South Africa by 323 runs
