= Trevor Docking =

Australian cricketer (born 1952)

Personal information
- Full name: Trevor William Docking
- Born: 22 December 1952 (age 73); Burnie, Tasmania, Australia
- Batting: Left-handed
- Bowling: Leg-break

Domestic team information
- Years: Team
- 1974–1981: Tasmania

Career statistics
Competition	First-class	List A
Matches	15	16
Runs scored	438	355
Batting average	16.22	27.30
100s/50s	0/0	0/1
Top score	45	59
Balls bowled	30	0
Wickets	0	–
Bowling average	–	–
5 wickets in innings	0	–
10 wickets in match	0	–
Best bowling	0/0	–
Catches/stumpings	8/–	4/–
- Source: Cricket Archive, 15 August 2010

Trevor William Docking (born 23 February 1952 in Burnie, Tasmania) is a former Australian cricketer who played for Tasmania from 1976 to 1980.

Trevor Docking was a left-handed batsman and very occasional leg-break bowler. He was a member of the Tasmanian team which played in the state's first ever Sheffield Shield match in 1977, and was a member of the 1978–79 Gillette Cup winning side.

== See also ==
- List of Tasmanian representative cricketers
