= Zimbabwe Twenty20 Triangular Series in 2012 =

2012 cricket tournament held in Zimbabwe

2012 Zimbabwe Twenty20 Triangular Series
- Date: 17 June 2012 – 24 June 2012
- Location: Zimbabwe
- Result: Winners – Zimbabwe
- Player of the series: (Zimbabwe) Hamilton Masakadza
Teams
Bangladesh	South Africa	Zimbabwe
Captains
Mushfiqur Rahim	Hashim Amla	Brendan Taylor
Most runs
Mohammad Ashraful (114)	Richard Levi (131)	Hamilton Masakadza (267)
Most wickets
Mashrafe Mortaza (5)	Wayne Parnell (7)	Christopher Mpofu (7)

The 2012 Zimbabwe Twenty20 Triangular Series was a Twenty20 cricket tournament held in Zimbabwe. The tournament was originally scheduled as a 5-match Twenty20 series between Zimbabwe and South Africa. Bangladesh was included in this series at the request of the Bangladesh Cricket Board after Bangladesh's tour of Pakistan and Zimbabwe were postponed, leaving Bangladesh with no international cricket between March and September 2012. The matches in this series were not classified as official Twenty20 International matches, but instead classified as domestic t20 matches.

The tournament was won by Zimbabwe, who defeated South Africa by 9 wickets in the final in Harare.

== Squads ==
Zimbabwe	Bangladesh	South Africa
Brendan Taylor (c) & (wk); Hamilton Masakadza (vc); Tendai Chatara; Chamunorwa Chibhabha; Elton Chigumbura; Charles Coventry; Graeme Cremer; Craig Ervine; Kyle Jarvis; Kevin Kasuza; Shingirai Masakadza; Stuart Matsikenyeri; Keegan Meth; Chris Mpofu; Forster Mutizwa (wk); Richard Muzhange; Njabulo Ncube; Ray Price; Vusi Sibanda; Tatenda Taibu (wk); Prosper Utseya; Brian Vitori; Malcolm Waller	Mushfiqur Rahim (c) & (wk); Mahmudullah (vc); Abdur Razzak; Abul Hasan; Anamul Haque; Elias Sunny; Farhad Reza; Jahurul Islam; Junaid Siddique; Mashrafe Mortaza; Mohammad Ashraful; Nasir Hossain; Nazmul Hossain; Tamim Iqbal; Ziaur Rahman	Hashim Amla (c); Farhaan Behardien; Marchant de Lange; Jean-Paul Duminy; Francois du Plessis; Colin Ingram; Richard Levi; Albie Morkel; Chris Morris; Justin Ontong; Wayne Parnell; Robin Peterson; Dane Vilas (wk)

== Points table ==
Pos	Team	Pld	W	L	T	NR	BP	Pts	NRR
1	South Africa	4	2	2	0	0	0	8	0.378
2	Zimbabwe	4	2	2	0	0	0	8	−0.086
3	Bangladesh	4	2	2	0	0	0	8	−0.280

Source: Points table on ESPN CricInfo

== Tour matches ==
15 June
09:30
Scorecard

Bangladeshis; 126/7 (20 overs)	v	Zimbabwe Select XI; 127/7 (19.3 overs)
Mohammad Ashraful 32 (25); Graeme Cremer 4/14 (4 overs)		Elton Chigumbura 38 (28); Abul Hasan 2/15 (4 overs)

Zimbabwe Select XI won by 3 wickets
Country Club, Harare
Umpires: Iknow Chabi and Sifelani Rwaziyeni

- Bangladeshis won the toss and elected to bat.

15 June
13:30
Scorecard

Zimbabwe Select XI; 175/5 (20 overs)	v	Bangladeshis; 156/7 (20 overs)
Hamilton Masakadza 102 (60); Nazmul Hossain 2/41 (4 overs)		Mushfiqur Rahim 49 (33); Shingi Masakadza 2/14 (3 overs)

Zimbabwe Select XI won by 19 runs
Country Club, Harare
Umpires: Iknow Chabi and Sifelani Rwaziyeni

- Zimbabwe Select XI won the toss and elected to bat.

== Matches ==
=== 1st match ===
17 June
13:00
Scorecard

Zimbabwe; 154/6 (20 overs)	v	Bangladesh; 143/5 (20 overs)
Hamilton Masakadza 62 (35); Abul Hasan 2/37 (4 overs)		Tamim Iqbal 38 (35); Christopher Mpofu 2/20 (4 overs)

Zimbabwe won by 11 runs
Harare Sports Club, Harare
Umpires: Owen Chirombe and Russell Tiffin
Player of the match: Hamilton Masakadza (ZIM)

- Zimbabwe won the toss and elected to bat.

=== 2nd match ===
19 June
13:00
Scorecard

South Africa; 209/3 (20 overs)	v	Bangladesh; 170/8 (20 overs)
Hashim Amla 88* (53); Ziaur Rahman 1/28 (3 overs)		Mushfiqur Rahim 50* (32); Robin Peterson 2/16 (4 overs)

South Africa won by 39 runs
Harare Sports Club, Harare
Umpires: Langton Rusere and Russell Tiffin
Player of the match: Hashim Amla (RSA)

- South Africa won the toss and elected to bat.

=== 3rd match ===
20 June
13:00
Scorecard

Zimbabwe; 176/4 (20 overs)	v	South Africa; 147 (19.2 overs)
Vusi Sibanda 58 (50); Wayne Parnell 2/33 (3 overs)		Colin Ingram 48 (39); Christopher Mpofu 3/20 (4 overs)

Zimbabwe won by 29 runs
Harare Sports Club, Harare
Umpires: Owen Chirombe and Jeremiah Matibiri
Player of the match: Christopher Mpofu (ZIM)

- Zimbabwe won the toss and elected to bat.

=== 4th match ===
21 June
13:00
Scorecard

Zimbabwe; 149/8 (20 overs)	v	Bangladesh; 153/4 (17.3 overs)
Hamilton Masakadza 56 (54); Mashrafe Mortaza 2/28 (4 overs)		Nasir Hossain 41 (31); Kyle Jarvis 1/18 (3 overs)

Bangladesh won by 6 wickets
Harare Sports Club, Harare
Umpires: Owen Chirombe and Langton Rusere
Player of the match: Mashrafe Mortaza (BAN)

- Zimbabwe won the toss and elected to bat

=== 5th match ===
22 June
13:00
Scorecard

Bangladesh; 132/7 (19.5 overs)	v	South Africa; 129/7 (20 overs)
Mohammad Ashraful 40 (40); Marchant de Lange 3–25 (3 overs)		Justin Ontong 41 (36); Elias Sunny 1–18 (3 overs)

Bangladesh win by 3 wickets
Harare Sports Club, Harare
Umpires: Jeremiah Matbiri and Russell Tiffin
Player of the match: Mahmudullah (BAN)

- South Africa won the toss and elected to bat

=== 6th match ===
23 June
13:00
Scorecard

Zimbabwe; 124/6 (20 overs)	v	South Africa; 130/4 (20 overs)
Graeme Cremer 36* (27); Wayne Parnell 3/16 (4 overs)		Richard Levi 54 (30); Malcolm Waller 1/3 (1 over)

South Africa won by 6 wickets
Harare Sports Club, Harare
Umpires: Jeremiah Matibiri and Langton Rusere
Player of the match: Wayne Parnell (RSA)

- Zimbabwe won the toss and elected to bat.

=== Final ===
24 June
13:00
Scorecard

South Africa; 146/6 (20 overs)	v	Zimbabwe; 150/1 (17.1 overs)
Francois du Plessis 66 (57); Kyle Jarvis 2/22 (4 overs)		Brendan Taylor 59 (41); Chris Morris 1/24 (4 overs)

Zimbabwe won by 9 wickets
Harare Sports Club, Harare
Umpires: Owen Chirombe and Russell Tiffin
Player of the match: Brendan Taylor (ZIM)

- South Africa won the toss and elected to bat.
