= Marshall Rosen =

Australian cricketer

Personal information
- Full name: Marshall Frederick Rosen
- Born: 17 September 1948 (age 78); Paddington, Sydney, Australia
- Batting: Right-handed
- Bowling: Right-arm medium

Domestic team information
- Years: Team
- 1971/72–1975/76: New South Wales

Career statistics
Competition	First-class	List A
Matches	21	5
Runs scored	1220	121
Batting average	30.50	24.20
100s/50s	0/9	0/0
Top score	97	37
Balls bowled	56	0
Wickets	1	–
Bowling average	25.00	–
5 wickets in innings	0	–
10 wickets in match	0	–
Best bowling	1/21	–
Catches/stumpings	13/–	2/–
- Source: Cricinfo, 20 May 2023

Marshall Frederick Rosen (born 17 September 1948) is a former cricket player for New South Wales, and a member of the NSW Cricket Association Board.

== Cricket career ==
Rosen represented New South Wales in the Sheffield Shield between 1971 and 1975 as an opening batsman. His highest first-class score was 97, when New South Wales beat Western Australia in December 1973.

In 2007 Rosen, who is Jewish, was inducted into the Maccabi NSW Hall of Fame.

Rosen was elected a State Selector in 2002, and was elected as a Director of the NSW Cricket Association Board in 2005.

== Personal life ==
Rosen graduated from the University of NSW in 1973. He is a Managing Director of his own construction business, Riboni Group of Companies.

== See also ==
- List of select Jewish cricketers
