= Robert Rowan (cricketer) =

Australian cricketer (born 1947)

Personal information
- Full name: Robert Kenneth Rowan
- Born: 14 September 1947 (age 79); Melbourne, Australia
- Batting: Right-handed
- Bowling: Left-arm fast-medium
- Role: Opening bowler

Domestic team information
- Years: Team
- 1969-70 to 1972-73: Victoria

Career statistics
Competition	FC	List A
Matches	11	6
Runs scored	191	61
Batting average	21.22	20.33
100s/50s	0/1	0/0
Top score	51	47
Balls bowled	2350	351
Wickets	41	7
Bowling average	24.87	20.85
5 wickets in innings	3	0
10 wickets in match	0	0
Best bowling	7/36	3/35
Catches/stumpings	4/0	0/0
- Source: Cricket Archive, 20 December 2016

Robert Rowan (born 14 September 1947) is a former Australian cricketer. He played eleven first-class cricket matches for Victoria between 1969 and 1973.

Rowan took the first wicket in List A cricket in Australia, in the opening men's match of the Vehicle & General Australasian Knock-out Competition between Tasmania and Victoria at the MCG in November 1969. The batsman was Baden Sharman, caught behind by Norman Carlyon.

== See also ==
- List of Victoria first-class cricketers
