= Stephen Howard (cricketer) =

Australian cricketer

Personal information
- Full name: Stephen John Howard
- Born: 7 February 1949 (age 77); Launceston, Tasmania, Australia
- Batting: Right-handed
- Bowling: Right-arm medium

Domestic team information
- Years: Team
- 1969/70–1978/79: Tasmania

Career statistics
Competition	FC	LA
Matches	20	16
Runs scored	819	303
Batting average	22.75	20.20
100s/50s	1/2	0/2
Top score	111	61
Balls bowled	88	56
Wickets	2	1
Bowling average	26.50	88.00
5 wickets in innings	0	0
10 wickets in match	0	–
Best bowling	1/12	1/37
Catches/stumpings	11/–	4/–
- Source: Cricinfo, 4 January 2011

Stephen John Howard (born 7 February 1949) is a former Australian cricketer who played for Tasmania from 1969 until 1980.

A right-handed batsman and right-arm medium-pace bowler, Howard debuted for Tasmania in the first List A cricket match played in Australia. On the losing side against Victoria in late November 1969 he scored 39 not out, winning Australia's first man of the match award. His first-class debut came a month later when Tasmania played a New Zealand XI in Hobart.

Howard's sole first-class century was scored for Tasmania during a match against New South Wales in Hobart during the 1976–77 season. He went to the wicket with the score at 3 for 8 and made 111 out of a team total of 227. He was a member of Tasmania's inaugural Sheffield Shield team in October 1977. He was an opening batsman for the Tasmanian team that won the Gillette Cup in 1978–79. In 1979 he played a season as the professional for Nelson in the Lancashire League.

Howard also played senior Australian rules football with City-South in the NTFA during the late 1960s.

Preceded by Larry Gomes	Nelson Cricket Club; Professional; 1979	Succeeded by Derek Parker
