= Kevin Badcock =

Australian cricketer (born 1951)

Personal information
- Born: 24 March 1951 (age 75); Launceston, Tasmania, Australia

Domestic team information
- Years: Team
- 1968-1976: Tasmania
- Source: Cricinfo, 13 March 2016

Kevin Badcock (born 24 March 1951) is an Australian former cricketer. He played thirteen first-class matches for Tasmania between 1968 and 1976.

== See also ==
- List of Tasmanian representative cricketers
