= Dennis Baker (cricketer) =

Australian cricketer

Personal information
- Full name: Dennis James Baker
- Born: 29 December 1947 (age 78); Norseman, Western Australia
- Batting: Right-handed
- Bowling: Right-arm fast-medium

Domestic team information
- Years: Team
- 1972/73–1975/75: Western Australia
- 1977/78: Tasmania
- 1981/82: Western Australia

Career statistics
Competition	First-class	List A
Matches	23	13
Runs scored	463	61
Batting average	19.29	15.25
100s/50s	0/3	0/0
Top score	66	21*
Balls bowled	3,878	683
Wickets	65	21
Bowling average	28.78	19.28
5 wickets in innings	1	0
10 wickets in match	0	0
Best bowling	5/45	4/35
Catches/stumpings	12/–	3/–
- Source: CricketArchive, 24 August 2010

Dennis James Baker (born 29 December 1947) was an Australian cricketer who played for Western Australia and Tasmania from 1972 until 1982.

On 28 July 2000, Baker was awarded the Australian Sports Medal with the citation reading "Dual Sheffield Shield representative for WA/Tas/career of more than 25 years".
