= Malcolm Francke =

Australian

Personal information
- Full name: Fredrick Malcolm Francke
- Born: 21 March 1939 (age 87); Mount Lavinia, Colombo, Ceylon
- Batting: Right-handed
- Bowling: Legbreak googly

Career statistics
| Competition | First-class | List A |
|---|---|---|
| Matches | 61 | 12 |
| Runs scored | 696 | 50 |
| Batting average | 10.54 | 12.50 |
| 100s/50s | 0/0 | 0/0 |
| Top score | 37* | 26 |
| Balls bowled | 12,090 | 636 |
| Wickets | 178 | 17 |
| Bowling average | 31.02 | 22.47 |
| 5 wickets in innings | 8 | 0 |
| 10 wickets in match | 1 | 0 |
| Best bowling | 6/62 | 4/23 |
| Catches/stumpings | 31/– | 4/– |
- Source: CricketArchive, 3 February 2023

Fredrick Malcolm Francke (born 21 March 1939) is a former Australian first-class cricketer who played for Queensland.

A leg spinner, Francke played for Ceylon in 1957/58, and worked and played cricket in England for several years prior to migrating to Australia. He reports having had offers to play first-class county cricket in England but chose not to because it would have been a full-time commitment requiring him to suspend his career as an accountant. He represented Queensland from 1971/72 to 1985/86, making his debut against a touring World XI side. Francke dismissed Clive Lloyd twice and also took the wickets of captain Rohan Kanhai and Sunil Gavaskar. He went on to take a total of 167 career first class wickets for Queensland with an innings best of 6 for 62 against South Australia in 1974.

In a 1977 article Ian Chappell called Francke "a very steady type of spinner, with good line and length, but I can't really see him bowling out Test batsmen. As well, he is getting on in years."

He appeared to have played his last game in 1980 but made a return 6 years later to play in the 1985/86 Sheffield Shield season.

In 1975 he was part of a rebel tour of South Africa, playing for the Brian Close-led DH Robins XI.

Leading Australian spinner Ashley Mallett considered Francke to be the best legspinner in Australia during his time and was disappointed Francke never played Test cricket. He had been mentioned in particular as a test chance in 1972/73 and 1973/74 and 74/75.

In September 2018, he was one of 49 former Sri Lankan cricketers felicitated by Sri Lanka Cricket, to honour them for their services before Sri Lanka became a full member of the International Cricket Council (ICC).

== Sources ==
- Mallett, A. (1993) Clarrie Grimmett: The Bradman of spin, University of Queensland Press: Brisbane. ISBN 0 7022 2531 2.
