= Harold Allen (cricketer, born 1940) =

Australian cricketer (born 1940)

Personal information
- Born: 15 November 1940 (age 85); Latrobe, Tasmania, Australia

Domestic team information
- Years: Team
- 1965-1971: Tasmania
- Source: Cricinfo, 23 January 2016

Harold Allen (born 15 November 1940) is an Australian former cricketer. He played eight first-class matches for Tasmania between 1965 and 1971.

== See also ==
- List of Tasmanian representative cricketers
