= Denis Schuller =

Australian cricketer

Personal information
- Full name: Denis Clemenceau Schuller
- Born: 5 May 1948; Herston, Brisbane, Queensland, Australia
- Died: 20 March 2021 (aged 72)
- Batting: Right-handed
- Bowling: Left-arm fast-medium

Domestic team information
- Years: Team
- 1975/76–1980/81: Queensland

Career statistics
Competition	FC	List A
Matches	28	7
Runs scored	545	5
Batting average	14.58	2.50
100s/50s	0/0	0/0
Top score	48	5
Balls bowled	4,445	266
Wickets	66	9
Bowling average	29.72	17.22
5 wickets in innings	2	0
10 wickets in match	0	–
Best bowling	6/35	3/22
Catches/stumpings	14/–	0/–
- Source: Cricinfo, 19 April 2026

Denis Clemenceau Schuller (5 May 1948 – 20 March 2021) was an Australian cricketer who played first-class and List A cricket for Queensland from 1975–76 to 1980–81.

Schuller was a left-arm pace bowler. He represented Queensland Country against the West Indians in 1968 and the Pakistanis in 1972. He took 4 for 77 in the one-day match against the Pakistanis, dismissing four top-order Test batsmen.

Schuller made his first-class and List A debuts in the 1975–76 season. He took 3 for 22 off eight eight-ball overs against Tasmania in his first List A match, on New Year's Day 1976. His best first-class bowling figures were 6 for 35 against Western Australia in 1978–79.

Schuller died on 20 March 2021, aged 72.
