= John Douglas (sportsman) =

Former Australian sportsman

Personal information
- Full name: John Raymond Douglas
- Born: 24 October 1951 (age 75); East Brunswick, Victoria
- Batting: Right-handed
- Bowling: Right-arm fast-medium

Domestic team information
- Years: Team
- 1975/76–1978/79: Victoria
- 1975/76: DH Robins' XI

Career statistics
| Competition | First-class | List A |
|---|---|---|
| Matches | 9 | 5 |
| Runs scored | 107 | 12 |
| Batting average | 13.37 | 6.00 |
| 100s/50s | 0/0 | 0/0 |
| Top score | 32* | 6* |
| Balls bowled | 1,759 | 296 |
| Wickets | 30 | 7 |
| Bowling average | 26.53 | 32.14 |
| 5 wickets in innings | 1 | 0 |
| 10 wickets in match | 1 | 0 |
| Best bowling | 7/71 | 3/45 |
| Catches/stumpings | 3/– | 1/– |
- Source: CricketArchive, 10 April 2023

John Raymond Douglas (born 24 October 1951) is a former Australian sportsman who played Australian rules football in the Victorian Football League (VFL) with North Melbourne during the 1970s and first-class cricket for Victoria.

From the Coburg Amateurs originally, Douglas made his VFL debut in the opening round of the 1972 season against St Kilda, whose Brownlow Medal rover Ross Smith was celebrating his 200th game. He played six further games that year and did not appear again until 1975, when North Melbourne won their inaugural premiership with Douglas taking the field three times during the home and away season. He finished his football career after playing just two games in 1976, to finish with 12 games and eight goals for North Melbourne.

A right-arm fast-medium pace bowler, Douglas claimed 30 wickets at 26.53 from his nine first-class matches. The first lot of matches came during the summer of 1975/76, while he was still a North Melbourne player, beginning with a Sheffield Shield encounter against New South Wales. Test player John Dyson was his maiden wicket and he finished his first innings with 4/65.

In early 1976, Douglas toured South Africa with the DH Robins' XI, a team with first-class status who annually toured the country during apartheid. His wickets for the tour included Eddie Barlow and Barry Richards.

The rest of his first-class matches were for Victoria in the Sheffield Shield, the most memorable being against South Australia at Adelaide Oval when he took match figures of 11/138. The haul included his best innings figures of 7/71.
