= Michael Norman (Australian cricketer) =

Australian cricketer (born 1952)

Personal information
- Full name: Michael John Norman
- Born: 17 August 1952 (age 74); Launceston, Tasmania, Australia
- Batting: Right-handed

Domestic team information
- Years: Team
- 1975/76–1978/79: Tasmania

Career statistics
Competition	FC	LA
Matches	11	5
Runs scored	366	28
Batting average	17.42	5.60
100s/50s	–/3	–/–
Top score	65	15
Balls bowled	–	–
Wickets	–	–
Bowling average	–	–
5 wickets in innings	–	–
10 wickets in match	–	–
Best bowling	–	–
Catches/stumpings	4/–	1/–
- Source: Cricinfo, 2 January 2011

Michael John Norman (born 17 August 1952 in Launceston, Tasmania) is a former Australian cricket player, who played for Tasmania.

Norman was a right-handed batsman who represented Tasmania from 1975 until 1979. He played in Tasmania's inaugural Sheffield Shield match in October 1977. He made his highest first-class score on his first-class debut against the West Indians in 1975-76 when he top-scored in Tasmania's first innings with 65.

== See also ==
- List of Tasmanian representative cricketers
