= Maxwell Walters =

Queensland cricketer and business executive

Maxwell Walters (born 28 July 1952 in Bundaberg) is an Australian cricketer and business executive.

Walters played first-class cricket for Queensland from 1975 to 1979, playing primarily as a batsman. He scored 544 first-class runs at an average of 22.66, with a top score of 122. He also played three one-day games for the state.

Walters has worked as Managing Director of Channel Seven Adelaide; various roles at KPMG; Financial Controller of Watkins Pacific Limited; Finance Director of Channel Seven Brisbane and Station Manager of Channel Seven Brisbane. In January 2004 he was appointed the Managing Director of Channel Seven Brisbane.

In 2016, Walters joined Queensland Cricket as CEO, serving in the role until 2019.

He was awarded an OAM in January 2011 for services to cricket, the Queensland community, and the media.
