= 2012 Trinidad and Tobago Quadrangular Twenty20 =

2012 Trinidad and Tobago Quadrangular Twenty20 Series
- Dates: 6 September – 8 September 2012
- Administrator: Cricket Trinidad & Tobago
- Cricket format: Twenty20 cricket
- Tournament format: Round Robin
- Host(s): Trinidad and Tobago
- Champions: Afghanistan (unofficialth title)
- Participants: 4
- Matches: 6
- Player of the series: (Afghanistan) Mohammad Nabi
- Most runs: (Afghanistan) Mohammad Nabi (123)
- Most wickets: (Afghanistan) Mohammad Nabi (7)
- Official website: Espn Cricinfo

The 2012 Trinidad Quadrangular T20 is a Twenty20 cricket tournament held in Trinidad & Tobago. The tournament is played for the Trinidad and Tobago's 50th year of independence. The tournament was scheduled to be a 6-match Twenty20 series between Trinidad & Tobago, Barbados, Bangladesh and Afghanistan. The matches in this series were not classified as official Twenty20 International matches, but instead classified as practice matches. The champions received a prize money of $50,000.

== Rules and regulations ==
In the tournament points are awarded to the team as follow;

Results	Points
Win	3 points
No result	1 point
Loss	0 points

- Each team will play 3 matches.
- The team with highest points will win the championship.
- If 2 team's point are equal then the champions will be decided by head-to-head result.
- If 3 or more team's points are equal then the champions will be decided by Net Run Rate.

== Squads ==
Afghanistan	(Bangladesh) BCB XI	Barbados	Trinidad and Tobago
Nawroz Mangal (c); Asghar Afghan; Dawlat Zadran; Gulbodin Naib; Hamid Hassan; Izatullah Dawlatzai; Javed Ahmadi; Karim Sadiq; Mohammad Nabi; Mohammad Shahzad (wk); Mohammad Nasim Baras; Najibullah Zadran; Samiullah Shenwari; Shafiqullah; Shapoor Zadran	Mushfiqur Rahim (c/wk); Mahmudullah (vc); Abdur Razzak; Abul Hasan; Elias Sunny; Farhad Reza; Jahurul Islam; Junaid Siddique; Mashrafe Mortaza; Mohammad Ashraful; Nasir Hossain; Shafiul Islam; Tamim Iqbal; Ziaur Rahman	Rashidi Boucher; Jonathan Carter; Kirk Edwards; Alcindo Holder; Carlo Morris; Omar Phillips; Kevin Stoute; Roston Chase; Ryan Hinds; Jason Holder; Ashley Nurse; Kemar Roach; Sharmah Brooks	Rayad Emrit (c); Adrian Barath; Kevon Cooper; Daren Ganga; Dave Mohammed; Evin Lewis; Jason Mohammed; Justin Guillen; Khary Pierre; Navin Stewart; Shannon Gabriel; Sherwin Ganga; William Perkins (wk); Yannick Ottley

== 2012 Trinidad and Tobago Quadrangular T20 Series ==
Pos	Team	Pld	W	L	T	NR	Pts	NRR
1	Afghanistan	3	2	1	0	0	6	0.404
2	(Bangladesh) BCB XI	3	2	1	0	0	6	0.330
3	Trinidad and Tobago	3	2	1	0	0	6	0.105
4	Barbados	3	0	3	0	0	0	−0.928

== Matches ==
6 September
(scorecard)

Barbados; 65/4 (8 overs)	v	(Bangladesh) BCB XI; 71/3 (6.3 overs)
Kyle Mayers 18 (7); Abul Hasan 2/14 (2 overs)		Mushfiqur Rahim 18 (17); Ryan Hinds 2/22 (2 overs)

BCB XI win by 7 wickets
Queen's Park Oval, Port of Spain, Trinidad
Umpires: Nadir Shah and JS Wilson
Player of the match: Ashley Nurse

- BCB XI won the toss and elected to field
- Rain reduced the match to 8 overs.

6 September
(scorecard)

Trinidad and Tobago; 171/9 (20 overs)	v	Afghanistan; 172/7 (19.4 overs)
William Perkins 49 (31); Dawlat Zadran 2/30 (4 overs)		Mohammad Nabi 57 (36); Rayad Emrit 2/25 (3.4 overs)

Afghanistan win by 3 wickets
Queen's Park Oval, Port of Spain, Trinidad
Umpires: MW Brown and PJ Nero
Player of the match: Mohammad Nabi

- Trinidad & Tobago won the toss and elected to bat

7 September
(scorecard)

Afghanistan; 99/5 (15 overs)	v	(Bangladesh) BCB XI; 100/2 (14.2 overs)
Mohammad Shahzad 29 (26); Shakib Al Hasan 2/13 (3 overs)		Mohammad Ashraful 47 (44); Mohammad Nabi 2/11 (3 overs)

BCB XI win by 8 wickets
Queen's Park Oval, Port of Spain, Trinidad
Umpires: PJ Nero and JS Wilson
Player of the match: Mohammad Nabi

- BCB XI won the toss and elected to field
- Rain reduced the match to 15 overs

7 September
(scorecard)

Barbados; 154/5 (20 overs)	v	Trinidad and Tobago; 155/5 (20 overs)
Jonathan Carter 54 (36); Yannic Ottley 1/13 (4 overs)		Evin Lewis 69 (59); Ryan Hinds 2/27 (4 overs)

Trinidad & Tobago win by 5 wickets
Queen's Park Oval, Port of Spain, Trinidad
Umpires: MW Brown and Nadir Shah
Player of the match: Evin Lewis

- Barbados won the toss and elected to bat

8 September
(scorecard)

Barbados; 119/9 (20 overs)	v	Afghanistan; 122/5 (17.1 overs)
Kyle Mayers 39 (25); Mohammad Nabi 3/23 (4 overs)		Mohammad Nabi 40 (27); Jonathan Carter 1/11 (1.1 overs)

Afghanistan win by 5 wickets
Queen's Park Oval, Port of Spain, Trinidad
Umpires: Nadir Shah and PJ Nero
Player of the match: Mohammad Nabi

- Afghanistan won the toss and elected to field

8 September
(scorecard)

BCB XI (Bangladesh); 124/9 (20 overs)	v	Trinidad and Tobago; 129/6 (19.3 overs)
Mohammad Ashraful 30 (21); Dave Mohammed 3/17 (4 overs)		Yannick Ottley 52* (27); Abdur Razzak 3/17 (4 overs)

Trinidad & Tobago win by 4 wickets
Queen's Park Oval, Pot of Spain, Trinidad
Umpires: MW Brown and Nadir Shah
Player of the match: Sherwin Ganga

- Trinidad & Tobago won the toss and elected to field
