= Jeffrey Langley =

Australian cricketer (born 1948)

Personal information
- Full name: Jeffrey Noel Langley
- Born: 28 October 1948 (age 78); Adelaide, Australia
- Batting: Right-handed
- Role: Batsman

Domestic team information
- Years: Team
- 1969/70–1974/75: South Australia
- 1975/76–1979/80: Queensland

Career statistics
Competition	First-class	List A
Matches	28	10
Runs scored	934	160
Batting average	21.22	17.77
100s/50s	2/2	–/1
Top score	117	59
Balls bowled	–	–
Wickets	–	–
Bowling average	–	–
5 wickets in innings	–	–
10 wickets in match	–	–
Best bowling	–	–
Catches/stumpings	26/–	1/–
- Source: Jeffrey Langley, 10 May 2012

Jeffrey Noel Langley (born 28 October 1948) is a former Australian cricketer who played for South Australia and Queensland during the 1970s. He was the nephew of Gil Langley and played primarily as a batsman.
