= International cricket in 1984–85 =

International cricket season

The 1984–85 international cricket season was from September 1984 to April 1985.

== Season overview ==
International tours
Start date	Home team	Away team	Results [Matches]			
Start date	Home team	Away team	Test	ODI	FC	LA
28 September 1984	India	Australia	—	0–3 [5]	—	—
12 October 1984	Pakistan	India	0–0 [3]	1–0 [3]	—	—
3 November 1984	Sri Lanka	New Zealand	—	1–1 [2]	—	—
8 November 1984	Australia	West Indies	1–3 [5]	—	—	—
12 November 1984	Pakistan	New Zealand	2–0 [3]	3–1 [4]	—	—
28 November 1984	India	England	1–2 [5]	1–4 [5]	—	—
12 January 1985	New Zealand	Pakistan	2–0 [3]	3–0 [4]	—	—
20 March 1985	West Indies	New Zealand	2–0 [4]	5–0 [5]	—	—
International tournaments
Start date	Tournament				Winners	
6 January 1985	(Australia) 1984–85 Benson & Hedges World Series				West Indies	
17 February 1985	(Australia) 1985 Benson & Hedges World Championship Cup				India	
22 March 1985	(United Arab Emirates) 1985 Rothmans Four-Nations Cup				India	

== September ==
=== Australia in India ===
ODI Series
No.	Date	Home captain 1	Away captain 2	Venue	Result
ODI 267	28 September	Sunil Gavaskar	Kim Hughes	Jawaharlal Nehru Stadium, New Delhi	Australia by 48 runs
ODI 268	1 October	Sunil Gavaskar	Kim Hughes	University Stadium, Trivandrum	No result
ODI 269	3 October	Sunil Gavaskar	Kim Hughes	Keenan Stadium, Jamshedpur	No result
ODI 270	5 October	Sunil Gavaskar	Kim Hughes	Sardar Patel Stadium, Ahmedabad	Australia by 7 wickets
ODI 271	6 October	Sunil Gavaskar	Kim Hughes	Nehru Stadium, Indore	Australia by 6 wickets

== October ==
=== India in Pakistan ===
Test Series
No.	Date	Home captain 1	Away captain 2	Venue	Result
Test 995	17–22 October	Zaheer Abbas	Sunil Gavaskar	Gaddafi Stadium, Lahore	Match drawn
Test 996	24–29 October	Zaheer Abbas	Sunil Gavaskar	Iqbal Stadium, Faisalabad	Match drawn
Test 996a	4–9 November	Zaheer Abbas	Sunil Gavaskar	National Stadium, Karachi	Match cancelled
ODI series
ODI 272	12 October	Zaheer Abbas	Sunil Gavaskar	Ayub National Stadium, Quetta	Pakistan by 46 runs
ODI 273	31 October	Zaheer Abbas	Mohinder Amarnath	Jinnah Stadium, Sialkot	No result
ODI 273a	2 November	Zaheer Abbas	Sunil Gavaskar	Arbab Niaz Stadium, Peshawar	Match cancelled

== November ==
=== New Zealand in Sri Lanka ===
ODI series
No.	Date	Home captain	Away captain	Venue	Result
ODI 274	3 November	Duleep Mendis	Jeremy Coney	P Sara Oval, Colombo	Sri Lanka by 4 wickets
ODI 275	4 November	Duleep Mendis	Jeremy Coney	Tyronne Fernando Stadium, Moratuwa	New Zealand by 7 wickets

=== West Indies in Australia ===
Test Series
No.	Date	Home captain	Away captain	Venue	Result
Test 997	9–12 November	Kim Hughes	Clive Lloyd	WACA Ground, Perth	West Indies by an innings and 112 runs
Test 999	23–26 November	Kim Hughes	Clive Lloyd	Brisbane Cricket Ground, Brisbane	West Indies by 8 wickets
Test 1002	7–11 December	Allan Border	Clive Lloyd	Adelaide Oval, Adelaide	West Indies by 191 runs
Test 1005	22–27 December	Allan Border	Clive Lloyd	Melbourne Cricket Ground, Melbourne	Match drawn
Test 1006	30 December–2 January	Allan Border	Clive Lloyd	Sydney Cricket Ground, Sydney	Australia by an innings and 55 runs

=== New Zealand in Pakistan ===
Test Series
No.	Date	Home captain 1	Away captain 2	Venue	Result
Test 998	16–20 November	Zaheer Abbas	Jeremy Coney	Gaddafi Stadium, Lahore	Pakistan by 6 wickets
Test 1000	25–29 November	Zaheer Abbas	Jeremy Coney	Niaz Stadium, Hyderabad (Sindh)	Pakistan by 7 wickets
Test 1003	10–15 December	Zaheer Abbas	Jeremy Coney	National Stadium, Karachi	Match drawn
ODI series
ODI 276	12 November	Zaheer Abbas	Jeremy Coney	Arbab Niaz Stadium, Peshawar	Pakistan by 46 runs
ODI 277	23 November	Zaheer Abbas	Jeremy Coney	Iqbal Stadium, Faisalabad	Pakistan by 5 runs
ODI 278	2 December	Zaheer Abbas	Jeremy Coney	Jinnah Stadium, Sialkot	New Zealand by 34 runs
ODI 280	7 December	Zaheer Abbas	Jeremy Coney	Ibn-e-Qasim Bagh Stadium, Multan	Pakistan by 1 wicket

=== England in India ===
Test Series
No.	Date	Home captain 1	Away captain 2	Venue	Result
Test 1001	28 November–3 December	Sunil Gavaskar	David Gower	Wankhede Stadium, Mumbai	India by 8 wickets
Test 1004	12–17 December	Sunil Gavaskar	David Gower	Arun Jaitley Stadium, Delhi	England by 8 wickets
Test 1007	31 December–5 January	Sunil Gavaskar	David Gower	Eden Gardens, Kolkata	Match drawn
Test 1008	13–18 January	Sunil Gavaskar	David Gower	MA Chidambaram Stadium, Chennai	England by 9 wickets
Test 1011	31 January–5 February	Sunil Gavaskar	David Gower	National Stadium, Karachi	Match drawn
ODI series
ODI 279	5 December	Sunil Gavaskar	David Gower	Nehru Stadium, Pune	England by 4 wickets
ODI 281	27 December	Sunil Gavaskar	David Gower	Barabati Stadium, Cuttack	England by 1 run
ODI 293	20 January	Sunil Gavaskar	David Gower	M.Chinnaswamy Stadium, Bengaluru	England by 3 wickets
ODI 295	23 January	Sunil Gavaskar	David Gower	Vidarbha C.A. Ground, Nagpur	India by 3 wickets
ODI 298	27 January	Sunil Gavaskar	David Gower	Sector 16 Stadium, Chandigarh	England by 7 runs

== January ==
=== 1984–85 Benson & Hedges World Series ===
Group stage
No.	Date	Team 1	Captain 1	Team 2	Captain 2	Venue	Result
ODI 282	6 January	Australia	Allan Border	West Indies	Clive Lloyd	Melbourne Cricket Ground, Melbourne	West Indies by 7 wickets
ODI 283	8 January	Australia	Allan Border	Sri Lanka	Duleep Mendis	Sydney Cricket Ground, Sydney	Australia by 6 wickets
ODI 284	10 January	Sri Lanka	Duleep Mendis	West Indies	Viv Richards	Tasmania Cricket Association Ground, Hobart	West Indies by 8 wickets
ODI 286	12 January	Sri Lanka	Duleep Mendis	West Indies	Clive Lloyd	Brisbane Cricket Ground, Brisbane	West Indies by 90 runs
ODI 287	13 January	Australia	Allan Border	West Indies	Clive Lloyd	Brisbane Cricket Ground, Brisbane	West Indies by 5 wickets
ODI 289	15 January	Australia	Allan Border	West Indies	Clive Lloyd	Sydney Cricket Ground, Sydney	West Indies by 5 wickets
ODI 290	17 January	Sri Lanka	Duleep Mendis	West Indies	Viv Richards	Sydney Cricket Ground, Sydney	West Indies by 65 runs
ODI 291	19 January	Australia	Allan Border	Sri Lanka	Duleep Mendis	Melbourne Cricket Ground, Melbourne	Sri Lanka by 4 wickets
ODI 292	20 January	Australia	Allan Border	West Indies	Clive Lloyd	Melbourne Cricket Ground, Melbourne	West Indies by 65 runs
ODI 294	23 January	Australia	Allan Border	Sri Lanka	Duleep Mendis	Sydney Cricket Ground, Sydney	Australia by 3 wickets
ODI 296	26 January	Sri Lanka	Duleep Mendis	West Indies	Clive Lloyd	Adelaide Oval, Adelaide	West Indies by 8 wickets
ODI 297	27 January	Australia	Allan Border	West Indies	Clive Lloyd	Adelaide Oval, Adelaide	West Indies by 6 wickets
ODI 299	28 January	Australia	Allan Border	Sri Lanka	Duleep Mendis	Adelaide Oval, Adelaide	Australia by 232 runs
ODI 300	2 February	Sri Lanka	Duleep Mendis	West Indies	Clive Lloyd	WACA Ground, Perth	West Indies by 82 runs
ODI 301	3 February	Australia	Allan Border	Sri Lanka	Duleep Mendis	WACA Ground, Perth	Australia by 9 wickets
Final
ODI 303	6 February	Australia	Allan Border	West Indies	Clive Lloyd	Sydney Cricket Ground, Sydney	Australia by 26 runs
ODI 304	10 February	Australia	Allan Border	West Indies	Clive Lloyd	Melbourne Cricket Ground, Melbourne	West Indies by 4 wickets
ODI 305	12 February	Australia	Allan Border	West Indies	Clive Lloyd	Sydney Cricket Ground, Sydney	West Indies by 7 wickets

=== Pakistan in New Zealand ===
Test Series
No.	Date	Home captain 1	Away captain 2	Venue	Result
Test 1009	18–22 January	Geoff Howarth	Javed Miandad	Basin Reserve, Wellington	Match drawn
Test 1010	25–28 January	Geoff Howarth	Javed Miandad	Eden Park, Auckland	New Zealand by an innings and 99 runs
Test 1012	9–14 February	Geoff Howarth	Javed Miandad	Carisbrook, Dunedin	New Zealand by 2 wickets
ODI series
ODI 285	12 January	Geoff Howarth	Javed Miandad	McLean Park, Napier	New Zealand by 110 runs
ODI 288	15 January	Geoff Howarth	Javed Miandad	Seddon Park, Hamilton	New Zealand by 4 wickets
ODI 302	6 February	Geoff Howarth	Javed Miandad	AMI Stadium, Christchurch	New Zealand by 13 runs
ODI 306	16–17 February	Geoff Howarth	Javed Miandad	Eden Park, Auckland	No result

== February ==
=== 1985 Benson & Hedges World Championship Cup ===
Team	Pts	Pld	W	L	RR
India	6	3	3	0	4.42
Pakistan	4	3	2	1	4.39
Australia	2	3	1	2	3.98
England	0	3	0	3	3.41

Team	Pts	Pld	W	L	NR	RR
West Indies	3	2	1	0	1	5.87
New Zealand	3	2	1	0	1	4.07
Sri Lanka	0	2	0	2	0	3.16

Group stage
No.	Date	Team 1	Captain 1	Team 2	Captain 2	Venue	Result
ODI 307	17 February	Australia	Allan Border	England	David Gower	Melbourne Cricket Ground, Melbourne	Australia by 7 wickets
ODI 308	19,21 February	New Zealand	Geoff Howarth	West Indies	Clive Lloyd	Sydney Cricket Ground, Sydney	No result
ODI 309	20 February	India	Sunil Gavaskar	Pakistan	Javed Miandad	Melbourne Cricket Ground, Melbourne	India by 6 wickets
ODI 310	23 February	New Zealand	Geoff Howarth	Sri Lanka	Duleep Mendis	Melbourne Cricket Ground, Melbourne	New Zealand by 51 runs
ODI 311	24 February	Australia	Allan Border	Pakistan	Javed Miandad	Melbourne Cricket Ground, Melbourne	Pakistan by 62 runs
ODI 312	26 February	England	David Gower	India	Sunil Gavaskar	Sydney Cricket Ground, Sydney	India by 86 runs
ODI 313	27 February	Sri Lanka	Duleep Mendis	West Indies	Clive Lloyd	Melbourne Cricket Ground, Melbourne	West Indies by 8 wickets
ODI 314	2 March	England	David Gower	Pakistan	Javed Miandad	Melbourne Cricket Ground, Melbourne	Pakistan by 67 runs
ODI 315	3 March	Australia	Allan Border	India	Sunil Gavaskar	Melbourne Cricket Ground, Melbourne	India by 8 wickets
Semi-finals
ODI 316	5 March	India	Sunil Gavaskar	New Zealand	Geoff Howarth	Sydney Cricket Ground, Sydney	India by 7 wickets
ODI 317	6 March	Pakistan	Javed Miandad	West Indies	Clive Lloyd	Melbourne Cricket Ground, Melbourne	Pakistan by 7 wickets
Third-place playoff
ODI 318	9 March	New Zealand	Geoff Howarth	West Indies	Viv Richards	Sydney Cricket Ground, Sydney	West Indies by 6 wickets
Final
ODI 319	10 March	India	Sunil Gavaskar	Pakistan	Javed Miandad	Melbourne Cricket Ground, Melbourne	India by 8 wickets

== March ==
=== New Zealand in West Indies ===
Test Series
No.	Date	Home captain 1	Away captain 2	Venue	Result
Test 1013	29 March–3 April	Viv Richards	Geoff Howarth	Queen's Park Oval, Port of Spain	Match drawn
Test 1014	6–11 April	Viv Richards	Geoff Howarth	Bourda, Georgetown	Match drawn
Test 1015	26 April–1 May	Viv Richards	Geoff Howarth	Kensington Oval, Bridgetown	West Indies by 10 wickets
Test 1016	4–8 May	Viv Richards	Geoff Howarth	Sabina Park, Kingston	West Indies by 10 wickets
ODI series
ODI 320	20 March	Viv Richards	Geoff Howarth	Antigua Recreation Ground, St. John's	West Indies by 23 runs
ODI 324	27 March	Viv Richards	Geoff Howarth	Queen's Park Oval, Port of Spain	West Indies by 6 wickets
ODI 326	14 April	Viv Richards	Geoff Howarth	Albion Sports Complex, Albion	West Indies by 130 runs
ODI 327	17 April	Viv Richards	Geoff Howarth	Queen's Park Oval, Port of Spain	West Indies by 10 wickets
ODI 328	23 April	Viv Richards	Geoff Howarth	Kensington Oval, Bridgetown	West Indies by 112 runs

=== 1985 Rothmans Four-Nations Cup ===
Group stage
No.	Date	Team 1	Captain 1	Team 2	Captain 2	Venue	Result
ODI 321	22 March	India	Kapil Dev	Pakistan	Javed Miandad	Sharjah Cricket Stadium, Sharjah	India by 38 runs
ODI 322	24 March	Australia	Allan Border	England	Norman Gifford	Sharjah Cricket Stadium, Sharjah	Australia by 2 wickets
Third-place playoff
ODI 323	26 March	England	Norman Gifford	Pakistan	Javed Miandad	Sharjah Cricket Stadium, Sharjah	Pakistan by 43 runs
Final
ODI 325	29 March	Australia	Allan Border	India	Kapil Dev	Sharjah Cricket Stadium, Sharjah	India by 3 wickets
