= Gary Whitney =

Australian cricketer (born 1951)

Personal information
- Full name: Gary Reginald Whitney
- Born: 19 March 1951 (age 75); Campbell Town, Tasmania, Australia
- Batting: Right-handed
- Bowling: Right-arm fast-medium

Domestic team information
- Years: Team
- 1973/74–1978/79: Tasmania

Career statistics
Competition	First-class	List A
Matches	9	7
Runs scored	14	4
Batting average	2.80	1.33
100s/50s	0/0	0/0
Top score	4	3
Balls bowled	1,534	422
Wickets	21	7
Bowling average	37.28	45.28
5 wickets in innings	0	0
10 wickets in match	0	0
Best bowling	2/22	3/44
Catches/stumpings	3/–	0/–
- Source: CricketArchive, 16 August 2010

Gary Reginald Whitney (born 19 March 1951) is a former cricketer who played for Tasmania. He was a right-handed batsman and right-arm fast-medium bowler who played for the side between 1973–74 and 1978–79. He was born at Campbell Town, Tasmania in 1951.
