= Ashley Woodcock =

Australian cricketer (born 1947)

Personal information
- Full name: Ashley James Woodcock
- Born: 27 February 1947 (age 79); Adelaide, South Australia
- Batting: Right-handed
- Role: Batsman

International information
- National side: Australia
- Only Test (cap 270): 26 January 1974 v New Zealand
- Only ODI (cap 24): 31 March 1974 v New Zealand

Domestic team information
- Years: Team
- 1967/68–1978/79: South Australia

Career statistics
Competition	Test	ODI	FC	LA
Matches	1	1	85	17
Runs scored	27	53	4,550	403
Batting average	27.00	53.00	30.95	25.18
100s/50s	0/0	0/1	5/31	0/4
Top score	27	53	141	83
Catches/stumpings	1/–	0/–	72/–	4/–
- Source: ESPNcricinfo, 6 September 2011

Ashley James Woodcock (born 27 February 1947) is a former Australian cricketer who played in one Test match and one One Day International in 1974. A right-handed batsman from Adelaide, he played for South Australia in Australian domestic cricket between 1967 and 1979, captaining the state in his latter years.

== Early life ==
Woodcock was educated at Prince Alfred College and became close friends with future Test captain Greg Chappell. Woodcock attended Adelaide University.

== Cricket career ==
Woodcock made both of his official international appearances against New Zealand in the first few months of 1974. His only test was the third test in Adelaide in January, when he was selected to open the batting with Keith Stackpole Woodcock scored 27 in his only innings.

Woodcock did not feature again in the Australian line up until the side went to New Zealand in March and played a two-match ODI series. The first, which the tourists won by seven wickets, featured a two-ball duck by Ian Redpath. Woodcock replaced Redpath for the second game, and cracked 53 from 66 balls with five fours and a six as Australia reached 265. Australia won by 31 runs. He won man of the match with this performance Wisden referred to Woodcock's knock as a "pleasant innings".

Woodcock played in one unofficial "test" for Australia against a Rest of the World X1 in 1971-72, scoring 5 and 16.

He continued playing for South Australia until 1978–79, and was captain in the later years, before traveling to America to complete his master's degree and PhD.

== Later years ==
He then went to America to complete his master's degree and PhD degrees, returning in the mid 80's to a coach in local club cricket, high performance programs and strength and conditioning for the Newcastle Falcons and Adelaide 36ers. He later became a lecturer at La Trobe University. In 2017, he became Coaching Director at Kensington Cricket Club in Adelaide.
