= Ross Collins (cricketer) =

Australian cricketer (born 1945)

Personal information
- Born: 9 December 1945 (age 80); Sydney, Australia
- Source: ESPNcricinfo, 25 December 2016

Ross Collins (born 9 December 1945) is an Australian cricketer. He played twenty-three first-class and six List A matches for New South Wales between 1967/68 and 1975/76.

== See also ==
- List of New South Wales representative cricketers
