= Dean Jones Trophy =

Australian cricket tournament

- Countries: Australia
- Administrator: Cricket Australia
- Format: Limited-overs (50 overs per side)
- First edition: 1969–70
- Latest edition: 2025–26
- Tournament format: Single round-robin, then finals series
- Number of teams: 10
- Current champion: New South Wales (13th title)
- Most successful: Western Australia (17 titles)
- Most runs: Brad Hodge (5595)
- Most wickets: James Hopes (145)
- TV: Fox Cricket
- Website: Cricket Australia
- 2026–27

The One-Day Cup, (Note: Has had many different names previously; was known as the One-Day Cup, name prefaced by various sponsors, from 2010 to 2024.) for which the prize was renamed the Dean Jones Trophy from the 2024–25 season, is an Australian domestic List A 50-over limited-overs cricket tournament. It has had many different names, formats and teams since the inaugural 1969–70 season. Initially a knockout cup, the competition now features a single round-robin followed by a finals series.

The tournament is contested between teams representing the six states of Australia, who also compete in the first-class Sheffield Shield. Three other teams have also played in the tournament for short periods: New Zealand's national team competed from 1969–70 until 1974–75, Australian Capital Territory participated from 1997–98 until 1999–2000, and a Cricket Australia XI of young players took part as the seventh team for three seasons from 2015–16 until 2017–18. The current champions are New South Wales.

== History ==
England was the first country to introduce a domestic one-day limited-overs competition with its Gillette Cup in 1963. Australia was the next country to do so when this competition was established in 1969–70. It has been held every summer since, under a wide variety of names and formats. It is a List A cricket competition. It was the first List A competition to feature numbers on player's shirts when they were introduced for the 1995–96 season; numbers were also subsequently introduced for the ODI series later in the season. In September 2017, former Australian Test cricketer Jason Gillespie suggested that Papua New Guinea should be added to the competition. In August 2024, Cricket Australia launched a campaign to rename the trophy presented to the winner of the competition after a former player, with fans being able to vote to select the trophy's new name.

== Seasons and competition formats ==
- 1969/70–1978/79 – Straight knockout
- 1979/80–1981/82 – 2 pools of 3, semi-finals, 3rd/4th playoff and final
- 1982/83–1991/92 – 2 pools of 3, semi-finals and final
- 1992/93–1999/2000 – Single round robin (i.e. home OR away), preliminary final and final
- 2000/01–2010/11 – Double round robin home and away plus final
- 2011/12–2012/13 – Partial round robin (8 matches per team, 3 of 5 opponents played both home and away), plus final
- 2013/14 – Carnival format, 6 round games, preliminary final and final
- 2014/15 – Carnival format, 7 round games, preliminary final and final
- 2015/16–2017/18 – Carnival format, 8 round games, preliminary final and final
- 2018/19 – Single round robin, 2 qualification finals, 2 semi-finals and final
- 2019/20–present – Carnival format, 7 round games and final

== Seasons of sponsorship and competition names ==
- 1969/70 - 1970/71 - Vehicle & General Australasian Knock-out Competition
- 1971/72 - 1972/73 - Coca-Cola Australasian Knock-out Competition
- 1973/74 - 1978/79 - Gillette Cup
- 1979/80 - 1987/88 - McDonald's Cup
- 1988/89 - 1991/92 - FAI Insurance Cup
- 1992/93 - 2000/01 - Mercantile Mutual Cup
- 2001/02 - 2005/06 - ING Cup
- 2006/07 - 2009/10 - Ford Ranger Cup
- 2010/11 - 2013/14 - Ryobi One-Day Cup
- 2014/15 - 2016/17 - Matador BBQs One-Day Cup
- 2017/18 - 2018/19 - JLT One-Day Cup
- 2019/20 - 2023/24 - Marsh One-Day Cup
- 2024/25-present - One-Day Cup

== Uniforms ==
Australian Capital Territory
ACT kit

Cricket Australia XI
Cricket Australia XI kit

New South Wales
New South Wales kit

New Zealand
New Zealand kit

Queensland
Queensland kit

South Australia
South Australia kit

Tasmania
Tasmania kit

Victoria
Victoria kit

Western Australia
Western Australia kit

== One-Day Cup teams ==

| Team colour | Limited-overs cricket team | Home cricket ground/s since 1969/70 | City/cities | Est. | First season | Last season | First title | Last title | Titles (total) | Runners-up |
|---|---|---|---|---|---|---|---|---|---|---|
| | Australian Capital Territory | Manuka Oval, Various Others^{[a]} | Canberra | 1928 | 1997/98 | 1999/00 | - | - | 0 | 0 |
| | Cricket Australia XI | Allan Border Field, Hurstville Oval^{[a]} | Brisbane, Sydney | 2015 | 2015/16 | 2017/18 | - | - | 0 | 0 |
| | New South Wales | Sydney Cricket Ground, Various Others^{[a]} | Sydney | 1856 | 1969/70 | Present | 1984/85 | 2020/21 | 13 | 10 |
| | New Zealand | None; None ^{[b]} | None; None ^{[b]} | 1894 | 1969/70 | 1974/75 | 1969/70 | 1974/75 | 3 | 2 |
| | Queensland | Brisbane Cricket Ground, Various Others^{[a]} | Brisbane | 1882 | 1969/70 | Present | 1975/76 | 2013/14 | 10 | 8 |
| | South Australia | Adelaide Oval, Various Others^{[a]} | Adelaide | 1887 | 1969/70 | Present | 1983/84 | 2024/25 | 4 | 7 |
| | Tasmania | Bellerive Oval, TCA Ground, Various Others^{[a]} | Hobart | 1851 | 1969/70 | Present | 1978/79 | 2009/10 | 4 | 7 |
| | Victoria | Melbourne Cricket Ground, Various Others^{[a]} | Melbourne | 1851 | 1969/70 | Present | 1971/72 | 2018/19 | 6 | 11 |
| | Western Australia | WACA Ground, Perth Stadium^{[a]} | Perth | 1893 | 1969/70 | Present | 1970/71 | 2023/24 | 17 | 11 |

- Titles correct up to the end of the 2023 season.

^{a} Each team has used several venues to host matches. For a full list, see list of cricket grounds in Australia.
^{b} New Zealand did not play home games in this series.

== Competition placings ==
For a complete list of finals with short scorecards and crowd figures, see Australian Domestic One-Day Cricket Final.

- ^{1} The 1982–83 final was originally washed out, and then rescheduled at the beginning of the 1983–84 season.
- ^{3} – Won third place playoff
- ^{4} – Lost third place playoff

=== 1969–70 to present ===
| Season | First | Second | Third | Fourth | Fifth | Sixth | Seventh |
|---|---|---|---|---|---|---|---|
| 1969–70 | New Zealand | Victoria | New South Wales | Western Australia | Queensland | South Australia | Tasmania |
| 1970–71 | Western Australia | Queensland | South Australia | New Zealand | Tasmania | Victoria | New South Wales |
| 1971–72 | Victoria | New Zealand | South Australia | Western Australia | Queensland | New South Wales | Tasmania |
| 1972–73 | New Zealand | Queensland | South Australia | New South Wales | Tasmania | Western Australia | Victoria |
| 1973–74 | Western Australia | New Zealand | South Australia | New South Wales | Victoria | Tasmania | Queensland |
| 1974–75 | New Zealand | Western Australia | Queensland | Tasmania | New South Wales | Victoria | South Australia |
| 1975–76 | Queensland | Western Australia | South Australia | Tasmania | —N/a | —N/a | —N/a |
| 1976–77 | Western Australia | Victoria | Queensland | New South Wales | —N/a | —N/a | —N/a |
| 1977–78 | Western Australia | Tasmania | New South Wales | Victoria | —N/a | —N/a | —N/a |
| 1978–79 | Tasmania | Western Australia | Queensland | Victoria | —N/a | —N/a | —N/a |
| 1979–80 | Victoria | New South Wales | Western Australia ^{3} | Tasmania ^{4} | —N/a | —N/a | —N/a |
| 1980–81 | Queensland | Western Australia | South Australia ^{3} | Victoria ^{4} | —N/a | —N/a | —N/a |
| 1981–82 | Queensland | New South Wales | Western Australia ^{3} | Victoria ^{4} | —N/a | —N/a | —N/a |
| 1982–83^{1} | Western Australia | New South Wales | Queensland | Victoria | —N/a | —N/a | —N/a |
| 1983–84 | South Australia | Western Australia | New South Wales | Tasmania | —N/a | —N/a | —N/a |
| 1984–85 | New South Wales | South Australia | Victoria | Western Australia | —N/a | —N/a | —N/a |
| 1985–86 | Western Australia | Victoria | New South Wales | Queensland | —N/a | —N/a | —N/a |
| 1986–87 | South Australia | Tasmania | Victoria | Western Australia | —N/a | —N/a | —N/a |
| 1987–88 | New South Wales | South Australia | Tasmania | Victoria | —N/a | —N/a | —N/a |
| 1988–89 | Queensland | Victoria | New South Wales | Western Australia | —N/a | —N/a | —N/a |
| 1989–90 | Western Australia | South Australia | New South Wales | Queensland | —N/a | —N/a | —N/a |
| 1990–91 | Western Australia | New South Wales | Queensland | Victoria | —N/a | —N/a | —N/a |
| 1991–92 | New South Wales | Western Australia | Queensland | Tasmania | —N/a | —N/a | —N/a |
| 1992–93 | New South Wales | Victoria | Western Australia | Queensland | Tasmania | South Australia | —N/a |
| 1993–94 | New South Wales | Western Australia | South Australia | Queensland | Victoria | Tasmania | —N/a |
| 1994–95 | Victoria | South Australia | Western Australia | Queensland | Tasmania | New South Wales | —N/a |
| 1995–96 | Queensland | Western Australia | New South Wales | South Australia | Tasmania | Victoria | —N/a |
| 1996–97 | Western Australia | Queensland | New South Wales | Victoria | Tasmania | South Australia | —N/a |
| 1997–98 | Queensland | New South Wales | Western Australia | South Australia | Tasmania | Aus. Cap. Territory | Victoria |
| 1998–99 | Victoria | New South Wales | Queensland | South Australia | Western Australia | Aus. Cap. Territory | Tasmania |
| 1999–00 | Western Australia | Queensland | New South Wales | South Australia | Victoria | Tasmania | Aus. Cap. Territory |
| 2000–01 | New South Wales | Western Australia | South Australia | Queensland | Tasmania | Victoria | —N/a |
| 2001–02 | New South Wales | Queensland | South Australia | Western Australia | Victoria | Tasmania | —N/a |
| 2002–03 | New South Wales | Western Australia | Queensland | Tasmania | Victoria | South Australia | —N/a |
| 2003–04 | Western Australia | Queensland | Victoria | New South Wales | South Australia | Tasmania | —N/a |
| 2004–05 | Tasmania | Queensland | Victoria | Western Australia | South Australia | New South Wales | —N/a |
| 2005–06 | New South Wales | South Australia | Victoria | Western Australia | Tasmania | Queensland | —N/a |
| 2006–07 | Queensland | Victoria | Western Australia | South Australia | Tasmania | New South Wales | —N/a |
| 2007–08 | Tasmania | Victoria | South Australia | Queensland | Western Australia | New South Wales | —N/a |
| 2008–09 | Queensland | Victoria | South Australia | Tasmania | Western Australia | New South Wales | —N/a |
| 2009–10 | Tasmania | Victoria | Queensland | New South Wales | Western Australia | South Australia | —N/a |
| 2010–11 | Victoria | Tasmania | New South Wales | Western Australia | South Australia | Queensland | —N/a |
| 2011–12 | South Australia | Tasmania | New South Wales | Queensland | Victoria | Western Australia | —N/a |
| 2012–13 | Queensland | Victoria | South Australia | New South Wales | Tasmania | Western Australia | —N/a |
| 2013–14 | Queensland | New South Wales | Victoria | Tasmania | Western Australia | South Australia | —N/a |
| 2014–15 | Western Australia | New South Wales | Queensland | Tasmania | Victoria | South Australia | —N/a |
| 2015–16 | New South Wales | South Australia | Victoria | Tasmania | Western Australia | Queensland | Cricket Australia XI |
| 2016–17 | New South Wales | Queensland | Victoria | Western Australia | Tasmania | South Australia | Cricket Australia XI |
| 2017–18 | Western Australia | South Australia | Victoria | New South Wales | Queensland | Tasmania | Cricket Australia XI |
| 2018–19 | Victoria | Tasmania | Western Australia | South Australia | New South Wales | Queensland | —N/a |
| 2019–20 | Western Australia | Queensland | South Australia | Tasmania | Victoria | New South Wales | —N/a |
| 2020–21 | New South Wales | Western Australia | Queensland | Tasmania | Victoria | South Australia | —N/a |
| 2021–22 | Western Australia | New South Wales | Tasmania | Queensland | South Australia | Victoria | —N/a |
| 2022–23 | Western Australia | South Australia | Victoria | Queensland | New South Wales | Tasmania | —N/a |
| 2023–24 | Western Australia | New South Wales | Victoria | Tasmania | Queensland | South Australia | —N/a |
| 2024–25 | South Australia | Victoria | New South Wales | Queensland | Tasmania | Western Australia | —N/a |
| 2025–26 | New South Wales | Tasmania | Queensland | Western Australia | South Australia | Victoria | —N/a |

== Leading run-scorers and wicket-takers for each team ==
Career statistics include all matches up to the end of the 2024–25 season.

| One-Day Cup team | Leading run scorer (career) | | Leading wicket taker (career) | |
|---|---|---|---|---|
| Victoria | Brad Hodge | 5597 runs @ 47.03 | Shane Harwood | 88 wickets @ 23.72 |
| Queensland | Jimmy Maher | 4589 runs @ 44.99 | James Hopes | 155 wickets @ 27.32 |
| South Australia | Callum Ferguson | 4085 runs @ 40.44 | Shaun Tait | 103 wickets @ 22.92 |
| Western Australia | Shaun Marsh | 3672 runs @ 44.78 | Andrew Tye | 128 wickets @ 20.80 |
| Tasmania | George Bailey | 3893 runs @ 35.07 | Xavier Doherty | 120 wickets @ 32.20 |
| New South Wales | Moises Henriques | 3325 runs @ 39.58 | Stuart MacGill | 124 wickets @ 22.36 |
| Australian Capital Territory | Peter Solway | 455 runs @ 25.27 | Lea Hansen | 12 wickets @ 21.16 |
| Cricket Australia XI | Will Bosisto | 386 runs @ 32.16 | Arjun Nair | 11 wickets @ 22.72 |
| New Zealand | Bevan Congdon | 265 runs @ 33.12 | Hedley Howarth | 11 wickets @ 9.90 |

== Player of the tournament ==
| Season | Player | State/territory |
|---|---|---|
| 1998–99 | Matthew Hayden | Queensland |
| 1999–2000 | Matthew Hayden | Queensland |
| 2000–01 | Shaun Young | Tasmania |
| 2000–01 | Darren Lehmann | South Australia |
| 2001–02 | Darren Lehmann | South Australia |
| 2002–03 | Justin Langer | Western Australia |
| 2006–07 | Matthew Elliott | South Australia |
| 2007–08 | Matthew Elliott | South Australia |
| 2008–09 | Shane Harwood | Victoria |
| 2009–10 | Brad Hodge | Victoria |
| 2010–11 | Brad Hodge | Victoria |
| 2011–12 | Tom Cooper | South Australia |
| 2012–13 | Aaron Finch | Victoria |
| 2013–14 | Cameron White | Victoria |
| 2014–15 | Cameron White | Victoria |
| 2015–16 | Mitchell Starc | New South Wales |
| 2016–17 | Marnus Labuschagne | Queensland |
| 2017–18 | Shaun Marsh | Western Australia |
| 2018–19 | Ben McDermott | Tasmania |
| 2019–20 | Usman Khawaja | Queensland |
| 2019–20 | Marnus Labuschagne | Queensland |
| 2020–21 | David Warner | New South Wales |
| 2020–21 | Tom Andrews | Tasmania |
| 2021–22 | Matt Renshaw | Queensland |
| 2022–23 | Josh Philippe | Western Australia |
| 2023–24 | Caleb Jewell | Tasmania |
| 2024–25 | Liam Scott | South Australia |

== Records and statistics ==
Batting records
| Most runs | Brad Hodge (Victoria) | 5,597 |
| Highest average (500+ runs) | Michael Bevan (New South Wales, South Australia, Tasmania) | 61.18 |
| Highest score | D'Arcy Short (Western Australia) | 257 vs Queensland (28 September 2018) |
| Highest partnership | Usman Khawaja & Chris Hartley (Queensland) | 280 vs Tasmania (18 October 2014) |
| Most hundreds | Brad Hodge (Victoria) | 20 |
Bowling records
| Most wickets | James Hopes (Queensland) | 155 |
| Lowest average (20+ wickets) | Mitchell Starc (New South Wales) | 15.42 |
| Best strike rate (20+ wickets) | Mitchell Starc (New South Wales) | 19.8 |
| Best economy rate (20+ wickets) | Dennis Lillee (Tasmania, Western Australia) | 3.12 |
| Best bowling figures | Shaun Tait (South Australia) | 8/43 vs Tasmania (9 January 2004) |
| Most wickets in a series | Mitchell Starc (New South Wales) | 26 (season 2015–16) |
Fielding
| Most dismissals (wicket-keeper) | Brad Haddin (New South Wales) | 164 |
| Most catches (fielder) | Cameron White (Victoria) | 56 |
Team records
| Highest total | Tasmania | 9/435 (50) vs South Australia (8 October 2023) |
| Lowest total | South Australia | 51 (28) vs Tasmania (26 January 2003) |

^{Last updated on 9 October 2023}

== Points system ==
Points are awarded as follows:

- 4 points for a win
- 2 points for a no-result or a tie
- 0 points for a loss
- 1 bonus point if a team achieves a run rate 1.25 times that of the opposition
- 2 bonus points if a team achieves a run rate twice that of the opposition

The top two teams at the end of the pool matches play-off in the final. The higher-placed team has the home ground advantage.

== Television coverage ==
In 2006–07, the Ford Ranger One Day Cup was televised on Fox Sports. 25 out of the 31 games were televised including the final. Prior to Fox Sports' broadcasting of the domestic cricket competition, Nine was the host broadcaster. In India STAR Cricket shows the telecast with the help of Fox Sports. In 2011–12, Fox Sports broadcast all 25 games of the Ryobi One Day Cup live. The Nine Network became the rights holder once again from season 2013–14 to the 2016–17 season, primarily showing matches Live on GEM and simulcasting via Cricket Australia's website. There are negotiations in place with ITV to televise the competition in the UK.

For the 2017–18 season, the Nine Network dropped its coverage of the JLT One Day Cup. All matches were streamed live and free on Cricket Australia's own website and app.

From the 2018–19 season, Fox Sports broadcast 13 matches of the tournament each year for six years on the new Fox Cricket channel. All remaining matches were streamed live on Cricket Australia's website and app.

== See also ==
- Australian Domestic One-Day Cricket Final
