= Australian cricket team in the West Indies in 1964–65 =

International cricket tour

| | West Indies | Australia |
- Dates: 3 March – 17 May 1965
| Captains | GSA Sobers | RB Simpson |

Test series
- Result: West Indies won the 5-match series 2–1
| Most runs | CC Hunte (550) | RM Cowper (417) |
| Most wickets | LR Gibbs (18) | NJN Hawke (24) |

The Australian cricket team toured the West Indies in the 1964–65 season to play a five-match Test series against the West Indies. The West Indies won the series 2–1, beating Australia for the first time in a series.

== Australian squad ==
The original squad selected were as follows:

- Batsmen – Bob Simpson (captain), Bill Lawry, Brian Booth, Norm O'Neill, Bob Cowper, Barry Shepherd, Grahame Thomas, Sam Trimble
- Fast bowlers – Graham McKenzie, Neil Hawke, Laurie Mayne, Peter Allan
- Spinners – Peter Philpott, David Sincock
- Wicketkeepers – Wally Grout, Barry Jarman

== Test series summary ==
=== First Test ===
3–8 March 1965
(6–day match)
Scorecard

| West Indies | v | Australia |
| 239 (69.2 overs); AW White 57*; LC Mayne 4/43 (17.2 overs) | | 217 (95.4 overs); NJN Hawke 45*; WW Hall 5/60 (24 overs) |
| 373 (152.4 overs); CC Hunte 81; LC Mayne 4/56 (23.4 overs) | | 216 (78.5 overs); BC Booth 56; WW Hall 4/45 (19 overs) |

West Indies won by 179 runs
Sabina Park, Kingston, Jamaica
Umpires: O Davies and D Sang Hue

- West Indies won the toss and elected to bat.
- 7 March was taken as a rest day.
- The match was scheduled for six days but completed in five.
- LC Mayne, PI Philpott and G Thomas (all AUS), and AW White (WIN) made their Test debuts.

=== Second Test ===
26 March–1 April 1965
(6–day match)
Scorecard

| West Indies | v | Australia |
| 429 (151.4 overs); BF Butcher 117; NCL O'Neill 4/41 (17.4 overs) | | 516 (215.5 overs); RM Cowper 143; GS Sobers 3/75 (27.5 overs) |
| 386 (147.5 overs); BA Davis 58; RB Simpson 4/83 (36.5 overs) |

Match drawn
Queen's Park Oval, Port of Spain, Trinidad
Umpires: CZ Bain and RG Gosein

- Australia won the toss and elected to field.
- 28 March was taken as a rest day.
- BA Davis (WIN) made his Test debut.

=== Third Test ===
14–20 April 1965
(6–day match)
Scorecard

| West Indies | v | Australia |
| 355 (107.2 overs); RB Kanhai 89; NJN Hawke 6/72 (32 overs) | | 179 (64.5 overs); RM Cowper 41; LR Gibbs 3/51 (25.5 overs) |
| 180 (77.4 overs); GS Sobers 42; NJN Hawke 4/49 (16 overs) | | 144 (58.2 overs); RM Cowper 30; LR Gibbs 6/29 (22.2 overs) |

West Indies won by 212 runs
Bourda, Georgetown, British Guiana
Umpires: GE Gomez and HBD Jordan

- West Indies won the toss and elected to bat.
- 18 April was taken as a rest day.
- The match was scheduled for six days but completed in five.
- When the local umpires' association boycotted the match because only one of its members was chosen to officiate, West Indian selection panel chairman Gerry Gomez was hastily pressed into service as the only person on the spot with the requisite qualifications, even though he had never officiated in a first-class match.

=== Fourth Test ===
5–11 May 1965
(6–day match)
Scorecard

| Australia | v | West Indies |
| 650/6d (189 overs); WM Lawry 210; WW Hall 2/117 (27 overs) | | 573 (212 overs); SM Nurse 201; GD McKenzie 4/114 (47 overs) |
| 175/4d (53.2 overs); NCL O'Neill 74*; LR Gibbs 2/61 (18.2 overs) | | 242/5 (85 overs); CC Hunte 81; GD McKenzie 2/60 (24 overs) |

Match drawn
Kensington Oval, Bridgetown, Barbados
Umpires: HBD Jordan and FCP Kippins

- Australia won the toss and elected to bat.
- 9 May was taken as a rest day.

=== Fifth Test ===
14–17 May 1965
(6–day match)
Scorecard

| West Indies | v | Australia |
| 224 (55.3 overs); RB Kanhai 121; NJN Hawke 3/42 (13 overs) | | 294 (128 overs); RB Simpson 72; CC Griffith 6/46 (20 overs) |
| 131 (48 overs); CC Hunte 60*; GD McKenzie 5/33 (17 overs) | | 63/0 (18 overs); RB Simpson 34* |

Australia won by 10 wickets
Queen's Park Oval, Port of Spain, Trinidad
Umpires: HBD Jordan and FCP Kippins

- West Indies won the toss and elected to bat.
- 16 May was taken as a rest day.
- The match was scheduled for six days but completed in three.

== Controversy ==
The series was marred by controversy of the bowling action of Charlie Griffith, who was accused by some observers of throwing.
