= Australian cricket team in the West Indies in 1972–73 =

International cricket tour

	West Indies	Australia
- Dates: 16 February – 26 April 1973
Captains	Rohan Kanhai	Ian Chappell

Test series
- Result: Australia won the 5-match series 2–0
Most runs	Roy Fredericks (381)	Ian Chappell (542)
Most wickets	Lance Gibbs (26)	Max Walker (26)

The Australian cricket team toured the West Indies in the 1972–73 season to play a five-match Test series against the West Indies. Australia won the series 2–0 with three matches drawn. Australia therefore kept the Sir Frank Worrell Trophy.

== Australian squad ==
The original squad selected were as follows:

- Batsmen – Ian Chappell (captain), Greg Chappell, Keith Stackpole, Doug Walters, John Benaud, Ian Redpath, Ross Edwards
- Fastbowlers – Dennis Lillee, Jeff Hammond, Max Walker, Bob Massie
- Spinners – Kerry O'Keeffe, Terry Jenner, John Watkins
- Wicketkeeper – Rod Marsh

== Test matches ==
Dennis Lillee became injured during the tour and Bob Massie lost form. However the other Australian bowlers performed admirably and Australia wound up winning the series comfortably.. Henry Blofeld later wrote in Wisden:

It hardly seemed possible for Australia to win a series in the West Indies without any contribution from Lillee and Massie who had developed into such a formidable combination against England a few months earlier, and without the services of Mallett, their off spinner, who was unavailable for the tour. In spite of all this Ian Chappell's side won impressively, beating the West Indies in the third and fourth Test matches at Port of Spain and Georgetown respectively. Australia won as much as anything because of the strength and the nature of their temperament which both collectively and individually refuses to accept defeat until it has become a fact. On the other hand it was the temperamental deficiencies of the West Indies players which contributed more to their defeat than any technical inadequacies.

== Test series summary ==
=== First Test ===
16–21 February 1973
Scorecard

Australia	v	West Indies
428/7d (157 overs); Rod Marsh 97; Lance Gibbs 4/85 (41 overs)		428 (124.5 overs); Maurice Foster 125; Max Walker 6/114 (39 overs)
260/2d (82 overs); Keith Stackpole 142; Vanburn Holder 1/34 (19 overs)		67/3 (33 overs); Roy Fredericks 21; Greg Chappell 2/18 (10 overs)

Match drawn
Sabina Park, Kingston
Umpires: Ralph Gosein and Douglas Sang Hue

- Australia won the toss and elected to bat.
- 19 February was taken as a rest day.
- Jeff Hammond (AUS) made his Test debut.

=== Second Test ===
9–14 March 1973
Scorecard

Australia	v	West Indies
324 (131 overs); GS Chappell 106; KD Boyce 3/68 (22 overs)		391 (152.4 overs); RB Kanhai 105; MHN Walker 5/97 (51.4 overs)
300/2 dec (119.1 overs); IM Chappell 106*; MLC Foster 1/29 (13 overs)		36/0 (19 overs); RC Fredericks 22*

Match drawn
Kensington Oval, Bridgetown
Umpires: HBD Jordan and D Sang Hue

- Australia won the toss and elected to bat.
- 12 March was taken as a rest day.
- ET Willett (WIN) made his Test debut.

=== Third Test ===
23–28 March 1973
Scorecard

Australia	v	West Indies
332 (129.1 overs); Doug Walters 112; Lance Gibbs 3/79 (38 overs)		280 (121.3 overs); Rohan Kanhai 56; Terry Jenner 4/98 (38.3 overs)
281 (107 overs); Ian Chappell 97; Lance Gibbs 5/102 (45 overs)		289 (113.1 overs); Alvin Kallicharran 91; Kerry O'Keeffe 4/57 (24.1 overs)

Australia won by 44 runs
Queen's Park Oval, Port of Spain
Umpires: Ralph Gosein and Douglas Sang Hue

- Australia won the toss and elected to bat.
- 26 March was taken as a rest day.

=== Fourth Test ===
6–11 April 1973
Scorecard

West Indies	v	Australia
366 (121.2 overs); Clive Lloyd 178; Doug Walters 5/66 (18.2 overs)		341 (135.4 overs); Ian Chappell 109; Lance Gibbs 3/67 (36 overs)
109 (52.3 overs); Geoff Greenidge 24; Jeff Hammond 4/38 (16 overs)		135/0 (43 overs); Keith Stackpole 76*

Australia won by 10 wickets
Bourda, Georgetown
Umpires: Cecil Kippins and Douglas Sang Hue

- West Indies won the toss and elected to bat.
- 9 April was taken as a rest day.

=== Fifth Test ===
21–26 April 1973
Scorecard

Australia	v	West Indies
419/8d (173 overs); Ross Edwards 74; Lance Gibbs 3/114 (52 overs)		319 (111.2 overs); Roy Fredericks 73; Max Walker 5/75 (37 overs)
218/7d (80 overs); Ian Chappell 37; Lance Gibbs 4/66 (32 overs)		135/5 (69 overs); Alvin Kallicharran 26; John Benaud 2/12 (4 overs)

Match drawn
Queen's Park Oval, Port of Spain
Umpires: Ralph Gosein and Douglas Sang Hue

- Australia won the toss and elected to bat.
- 24 April was taken as a rest day.
