= English cricket team in the West Indies in 1967–68 =

International cricket tour

The England national cricket team toured the West Indies from January to March 1968 and played a five-match Test series against the West Indies cricket team which England won 1–0. England were captained by Colin Cowdrey; West Indies by Garfield Sobers.

== Test series summary ==
=== First Test ===
19–24 January 1968
(5-day match)
Scorecard

England	v	West Indies
568 (200.5 overs); KF Barrington 143; CC Griffith 5/69 (29.5 overs)		363 (135 overs); CH Lloyd 118; IJ Jones 3/63 (19 overs)
		243/8 (f/o) (90 overs); BF Butcher 52; DJ Brown 3/27 (14 overs)

Match drawn
Queen's Park Oval, Port of Spain, Trinidad
Umpires: RG Gosein and HBD Jordan

- England won the toss and elected to bat.
- 21 January was taken as a rest day.
- GS Camacho (WIN) made his Test debut.

=== Second Test ===
8–14 February 1968
(5-day match)
Scorecard

England	v	West Indies
376 (169.2 overs); MC Cowdrey 101; WW Hall 4/63 (27 overs)		143 (48.1 overs); CH Lloyd 34*; JA Snow 7/49 (21 overs)
68/8 (38.5 overs); TW Graveney 21; LR Gibbs 3/11 (14 overs)		391/9d (f/o) (135 overs); GS Sobers 113*; IJ Jones 3/90 (30 overs)

Match drawn
Sabina Park, Kingston, Jamaica
Umpires: HBD Jordan and D Sang Hue

- England won the toss and elected to bat.
- 11 February was taken as a rest day.
- The match was scheduled for five days but extended to six, to make up for time lost due to rioting on the fourth day.

=== Third Test ===
29 February–5 March 1968
(5-day match)
Scorecard

West Indies	v	England
349 (143.1 overs); BF Butcher 86; JA Snow 5/86 (35 overs)		449 (180.5 overs); JH Edrich 146; CC Griffith 3/71 (24 overs)
284/6 (53 overs); CH Lloyd 113*; JA Snow 3/39 (10 overs)

Match drawn
Kensington Oval, Bridgetown, Barbados
Umpires: HBD Jordan and D Sang Hue

- West Indies won the toss and elected to bat.
- 3 March was taken as a rest day.
- PI Pocock (ENG) made his Test debut.

=== Fourth Test ===
14–19 March 1968
(5-day match)
Scorecard

West Indies	v	England
526/7d (133 overs); RB Kanhai 153; DJ Brown 3/107 (27 overs)		404 (175.4 overs); MC Cowdrey 148; BF Butcher 5/34 (13.4 overs)
92/2d (30 overs); MC Carew 40*; JA Snow 1/29 (9 overs)		215/3 (52.4 overs); G Boycott 80*; LR Gibbs 2/76 (16.4 overs)

England won by 7 wickets
Queen's Park Oval, Port of Spain, Trinidad
Umpires: RG Gosein and D Sang Hue

- West Indies won the toss and elected to bat.
- 17 March was taken as a rest day.

=== Fifth Test ===
28 March–3 April 1968
(6-day match)
Scorecard

West Indies	v	England
414 (150.4 overs); GS Sobers 152 (362); JA Snow 4/82 (27.4 overs)		371 (163.2 overs); G Boycott 116 (254); GS Sobers 3/72 (37 overs)
264 (66.2 overs); GS Sobers 95* (118); JA Snow 6/60 (15.2 overs)		206/9 (120 overs); MC Cowdrey 82 (211); LR Gibbs 6/60 (40 overs)

Match drawn
Bourda, Georgetown, British Guiana
Umpires: HBD Jordan and FCP Kippins

- West Indies won the toss and elected to bat.
- 31 March was taken as a rest day.
