= New Zealand cricket team in the West Indies in 1971–72 =

International cricket tour

The New Zealand national cricket team toured the West Indies from February to April 1972 and played a five-match Test series against the West Indies cricket team which was drawn 0–0. New Zealand were captained by Graham Dowling; the West Indies by Garfield Sobers. The tour also featured the maiden first-class match to be played by Bermuda. They played the touring New Zealand team in Hamilton, with the visitors winning by an innings and 31 runs.

== Test series ==
=== 1st Test ===
16–21 February 1972
Scorecard

West Indies	v	New Zealand
508/4d (153 overs); LG Rowe 214; HJ Howarth 2/108 (44 overs)		386 (187.5 overs); GM Turner 223*; GC Shillingford 3/63 (26.5 overs)
218/3d (53.4 overs); LG Rowe 100*; BE Congdon 2/45 (11 overs)		236/6 (108 overs); MG Burgess 101; DAJ Holford 4/55 (33 overs)

Match drawn
Sabina Park, Kingston, Jamaica
Umpires: JR Gayle and D Sang Hue

- West Indies won the toss and elected to bat.
- 20 February was taken as a rest day.
- LG Rowe (WIN) made his Test debut.

=== 2nd Test ===
9–14 March 1972
Scorecard

New Zealand	v	West Indies
348 (175.5 overs); BE Congdon 166*; VA Holder 4/60 (32 overs)		341 (155.1 overs); CA Davis 90; BR Taylor 4/41 (20.1 overs)
288/3d (140 overs); GM Turner 95; GS Sobers 1/54 (20 overs)		121/5 (46 overs); RC Fredericks 31; BR Taylor 3/26 (12 overs)

Match drawn
Queen's Park Oval, Port of Spain, Trinidad
Umpires: RG Gosein and D Sang Hue

- West Indies won the toss and elected to field.
- 13 March was taken as a rest day.

=== 3rd Test ===
23–28 March 1972
Scorecard

West Indies	v	New Zealand
133 (49.3 overs); TM Findlay 44*; BR Taylor 7/74 (20.3 overs)		422 (163.2 overs); BE Congdon 126; GS Sobers 4/64 (29 overs)
564/8 (214 overs); CA Davis 183; BE Congdon 2/66 (31 overs)

Match drawn
Kensington Oval, Bridgetown, Barbados
Umpires: HBD Jordan and FCP Kippins

- West Indies won the toss and elected to bat.
- 27 March was taken as a rest day.

=== 4th Test ===
6–11 April 1972
Scorecard

West Indies	v	New Zealand
365/7d (94.2 overs); AI Kallicharran 100*; BR Taylor 3/105 (37 overs)		543/3d (268 overs); GM Turner 259; AB Howard 2/140 (62 overs)
86/0 (40 overs); RC Fredericks 42*

Match drawn
Bourda, Georgetown, Guyana
Umpires: HBD Jordan and FCP Kippins

- West Indies won the toss and elected to bat.
- 10 April was taken as a rest day.
- GA Greenidge, AI Kallicharran, AB Howard (all WIN) made their Test debuts.

=== 5th Test ===
20–26 April 1972
Scorecard

West Indies	v	New Zealand
368 (128.4 overs); AI Kallicharran 101; BR Taylor 3/74 (19.4 overs)		162 (75.4 overs); TW Jarvis 40; I Ali 5/59 (26.4 overs)
194 (74.2 overs); VA Holder 42; BR Taylor 5/41 (24 overs)		253/7 (155 overs); BE Congdon 58; VA Holder 4/41 (26 overs)

Match drawn
Queen's Park Oval, Port of Spain, Trinidad
Umpires: RG Gosein and D Sang Hue

- West Indies won the toss and elected to bat.
- The match was scheduled for six days.
  24 April was taken as a rest day.
- RR Jumadeen (WIN) made his Test debut.
