= Pakistani cricket team in the West Indies in 1976–77 =

International cricket tour

Pakistani cricket team in the West Indies in 1976/77
	Pakistan	West Indies
- Dates: 18 February 1977 – 20 April 1977
Captains	Mushtaq Mohammad	Clive Lloyd

Test series
- Result: West Indies won the 5-match series 2–1
Most runs	Majid Khan (530); Wasim Raja (517); Asif Iqbal (314)	Gordon Greenidge (536); Roy Fredericks (517); Clive Lloyd (336)
Most wickets	Imran Khan (25); Sarfraz Nawaz (16); Mushtaq Mohammad (13)	Colin Croft (33); Joel Garner (25); Andy Roberts (19)
- Player of the series: Colin Croft (Pak)

One Day International series
- Results: West Indies won the 1-match series 1–0
Most runs	Asif Iqbal (59*)	Clive Lloyd (45)
Most wickets	Sarfraz Nawaz (3)	Joel Garner (3)

The Pakistan national cricket team toured the West Indies from February to April 1977 and played a five-match Test series against the West Indies cricket team which the West Indies won 2–1. Pakistan were captained by Mushtaq Mohammad; West Indies by Clive Lloyd.

The series was recognised as one of the finest of that era where West Indies managed to clinch it by 2/1 after narrowly escaping a defeat in first game at Barbados. It was memorable for debut of Colin Croft who picked 33 wickets in his debut series along with Joel Garner who too picked 25 wickets in his debut series. At the time, Pakistani skipper Mushtaq accused debutant Garner of illegal action although the claim was later found to be bogus.

West Indies defeat at Trinidad was their last in West Indies till 1988 again by Pakistan at Boruda

== Test series summary ==
=== First Test ===
18–23 February 1977
(5–day match)
Scorecard

Pakistan	v	West Indies
435 (133.4 overs); Wasim Raja 117*; J Garner 4/130 (37 overs)		421 (94.4 overs); CH Lloyd 157; Sarfraz Nawaz 3/125 (29 overs)
291 (67 overs); Wasim Raja 71; CEH Croft 4/47 (15 overs)		251/9 (100 overs); IVA Richards 92; Sarfraz Nawaz 4/79 (34 overs)

Match drawn
Kensington Oval, Bridgetown, Barbados
Umpires: RG Gosein and D Sang Hue

- Pakistan won the toss and elected to bat.
- 21 February was taken as a rest day.
- CEH Croft and J Garner (both WIN) made their Test debuts.

=== Second Test ===
4–9 March 1977
(5–day match)
Scorecard

Pakistan	v	West Indies
180 (67.5 overs); Wasim Raja 65; CEH Croft 8/29 (18.5 overs)		316 (116 overs); RC Fredericks 120; Mushtaq Mohammad 4/50 (20 overs)
340 (124.1 overs); Wasim Raja 84; AME Roberts 4/85 (26 overs)		206/4 (74 overs); CG Greenidge 70; Imran Khan 3/59 (24 overs)

West Indies won by 6 wickets
Queen's Park Oval, Port of Spain, Trinidad
Umpires: RG Gosein and D Sang Hue

- Pakistan won the toss and elected to bat.
- 7 March was taken as a rest day.
- IT Shillingford (WIN) made his Test debut.

=== Third Test ===
18–23 March 1977
(5–day match)
Scorecard

Pakistan	v	West Indies
194 (56.3 overs); Imran Khan 47; J Garner 4/48 (16 overs)		448 (162.3 overs); IT Shillingford 120; Majid Khan 4/45 (24 overs)
540 (163.3 overs); Majid Khan 167; J Garner 4/100 (39 overs)		154/1 (24.5 overs); CG Greenidge 96; Imran Khan 1/79 (12.5 overs)

Match drawn
Bourda, Georgetown, Guyana
Umpires: C Paynter and CF Vyfhuis

- West Indies won the toss and elected to field.
- 21 March was taken as a rest day.

=== Fourth Test ===
1–6 April 1977
(5–day match)
Scorecard

Pakistan	v	West Indies
341 (121.3 overs); Mushtaq Mohammad 121; AME Roberts 3/82 (25 overs)		154 (55.5 overs); RC Fredericks 41; Mushtaq Mohammad 5/28 (10.5 overs)
301/9d (85.5 overs); Wasim Raja 70; J Garner 3/71 (23 overs)		222 (104.5 overs); AI Kallicharran 45; Wasim Raja 3/22 (3.5 overs)

Pakistan won by 266 runs
Queen's Park Oval, Port of Spain, Trinidad
Umpires: RG Gosein and CF Vyfhuis

- West Indies won the toss and elected to field.
- 4 April was taken as a rest day.

=== Fifth Test ===
15–20 April 1977
(5–day match)
Scorecard

West Indies	v	Pakistan
280 (65.3 overs); CG Greenidge 100; Imran Khan 6/90 (18 overs)		198 (56.3 overs); Haroon Rasheed 72; CEH Croft 4/49 (13.3 overs)
359 (102.2 overs); RC Fredericks 83; Sikander Bakht 3/55 (16 overs)		301 (77.2 overs); Asif Iqbal 135; DAJ Holford 3/69 (18 overs)

West Indies won by 140 runs
Sabina Park, Kingston, Jamaica
Umpires: RG Gosein and D Sang Hue

- West Indies won the toss and elected to bat.
- 18 April was taken as a rest day.

== Guinness Trophy ==
=== Only ODI ===
16 March 1977
Scorecard

Pakistan; 176/7 (45 overs)	v	West Indies; 182/6 (43.2 overs)
Asif Iqbal 59* (65); J Garner 3/27 (9 overs)		CH Lloyd 45* (76); Sarfraz Nawaz 3/42 (9 overs)

West Indies won by 4 wickets
Albion Sports Complex, Albion, Guyana
Umpires: C Paynter and CF Vyfhuis
Player of the match: Asif Iqbal (PAK)

- West Indies won the toss and elected to field.
- The match was reduced before play started from 50 to 45 overs per side.
- Mohsin Khan (PAK), and CEH Croft and J Garner (both WIN) made their ODI debuts.
