= Bob Cowper =

Australian cricketer (1940–2025)

Bob Cowper OAM
Personal information
- Full name: Robert Maskew Cowper
- Born: 5 October 1940; Kew, Victoria, Australia
- Died: 11 May 2025 (aged 84); Melbourne, Victoria, Australia
- Nickname: Wallaby
- Batting: Left-handed
- Bowling: Right-arm off-spin
- Relatives: Dave Cowper (father); David Cowper (brother)

International information
- National side: Australia
- Test debut (cap 229): 6 July 1964 v England
- Last Test: 30 July 1968 v England

Domestic team information
- Years: Team
- 1959/60–1967/68: Victoria
- 1968/69: Western Australia
- 1969/70: Victoria

Career statistics
Competition	Test	FC	LA
Matches	27	147	4
Runs scored	2,061	10,595	77
Batting average	46.84	53.78	25.66
100s/50s	5/10	26/58	0/0
Top score	307	307	33
Balls bowled	3,005	14,917	100
Wickets	36	183	3
Bowling average	31.63	31.19	19.66
5 wickets in innings	0	1	0
10 wickets in match	0	0	0
Best bowling	4/48	7/42	2/17
Catches/stumpings	21/–	151/–	4/–
- Source: ESPNcricinfo, 15 May 2025

Robert Maskew Cowper OAM (5 October 1940 – 11 May 2025) was an Australian cricketer who played Test cricket for Australia from 1964 to 1968, and Sheffield Shield cricket for Victoria and Western Australia from 1960 to 1970. He scored the first Test cricket triple century on Australian soil, a 12-hour 307 against England at the MCG in February 1966.

== Cricket career ==
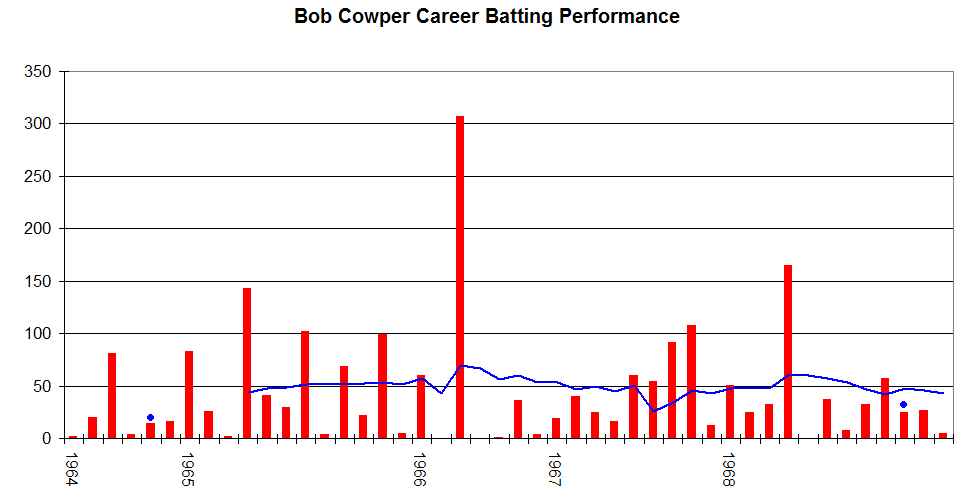
Bob Cowper's career performance graph.

Bob Cowper was the son of Dave Cowper, who captained the Australia national rugby union team in the 1930s. Bob's older brother Dave was also a cricketer. Bob was educated at Scotch College, Melbourne, and began playing for Hawthorn-East Melbourne in 1958. Two years later, he was in the Victorian team.

A tall, correct left-handed batsmen, Cowper scored heavily for Victoria in the 1962–63 and 1963–64 seasons and was selected to tour England in 1964. He was successful in the county matches but not in his first Test at Headingley. He took part in Australia's next tour, to the West Indies in 1964–65, when he "displayed courage, a cool temperament and fine technique in dealing with the hostile pace of Hall and Griffith". He was Australia's leading run-scorer in the Test series, with 417 runs at an average of 52.12, including centuries in the Second and Fourth Tests.

Cowper was dropped in the 1965–66 Ashes series for slow scoring. When he was recalled for the Fifth Test at Melbourne he made the first Test triple century in Australia: 307 from 589 balls in 727 minutes. It was the only Test triple century that was scored in Australia in the 20th century. Matthew Hayden's 380 against Zimbabwe in 2002–03 is now the highest Test innings in Australia, but Cowper's remains the longest.

After his triple century, he was never omitted from the Test team until a hand injury forced him out of the Fifth Test in 1968. In the last 13 matches of his Test career (the 1966–67, 1967–68, and 1968 series), he scored 931 runs at 38.79 and took 31 wickets at 25.22. In those 13 matches, no other Australian player exceeded 800 runs, and only Graham McKenzie, with 49, took more wickets. Cowper was only 27 when he played his last Test, at Headingley in 1968, almost exactly four years after his first, at Headingley in 1964.

Cowper captained Victoria to victory in the Sheffield Shield in 1969–70, then left cricket altogether to concentrate on his business career.

Cowper averaged 75.78 in home Tests but only 33.33 overseas. The difference of 42.45 is a Test record.

== Later career ==
At the early age of 27, and having qualified as an accountant while playing cricket, Cowper decided to focus on stockbroking and merchant banking, eventually becoming a multi-millionaire. With regards to his decision to retire as a cricketer at the early age of 27, Cowper said:

One morning reality really hit me. I worked out that, for playing cricket for Australia for nine months out of the previous 12, my gross income for the year was $3,000. It was time to go.

He also served as a cricket referee. In 1977, he joined the administrative board of World Series Cricket. In the 1980s, he moved to Monaco. He was Australia's representative to the International Cricket Council from 1987 to 2001.

Cowper was awarded life membership of Cricket Victoria in 2018. In the 2023 King's Birthday Honours, he was awarded the Medal of the Order of Australia in recognition for his service to cricket.

== Death ==
Cowper died in Melbourne on 11 May 2025, at the age of 84.
