= David Cowper =

David Cowper may refer to:

- David Cowper (cricketer), Australian cricketer
- David Scott Cowper, British yachtsman
- Dave Cowper, Australian rugby union player
