= Ross Duncan =

Australian cricketer (born 1944)

Personal information
- Full name: John Ross Frederick Duncan
- Born: 25 March 1944 (age 82); Herston, Brisbane, Queensland, Australia
- Batting: Right-handed
- Bowling: Right-arm fast-medium

International information
- National side: Australia
- Only Test (cap 252): 21 January 1971 v England

Career statistics
Competition	Tests	First-class
Matches	1	71
Runs scored	3	649
Batting average	3.00	8.42
100s/50s	0/0	-/1
Top score	3	52
Balls bowled	112	15,910
Wickets	0	218
Bowling average	–	31.19
5 wickets in innings	–	9
10 wickets in match	–	1
Best bowling	–	8/55
Catches/stumpings	0/-	33/-
- Source: Cricinfo, 17 May 2021

John Ross Frederick Duncan (born 25 March 1944) is a former Australian cricketer who played one Test in 1971.

A right-arm fast-medium bowler, Duncan was brought into the Test team for the Fifth Test at Melbourne which replaced the Victoria second tour match against the MCC in the 1970–71 Ashes series. Brought in as a fast-medium seam bowler to replace the injured Graham McKenzie, Duncan made only 3 with the bat and took 0/30 with the ball in the first innings, but did not bat or bowl in the second and took no catches. He was dropped for the Sixth Test in favour of Dennis Lillee. He also represented Australia in 1971–72 in one match against Gary Sobers' Rest of the World XI, again without success.

He played for Queensland from 1964–65 to 1970–71, usually opening the bowling with Peter Allan, then for Victoria in 1971–72 and 1972–73. His best performance was 8 for 55 and 5 for 70 against Victoria at Melbourne in December 1970.

== See also ==
- List of Victoria first-class cricketers
