= List of Australia Test cricketers =

Australian Cricketers

This is a list of Australia Test cricketers. A Test match is an international two-innings per side cricket match between two of the leading cricketing nations. The list is arranged in the order in which each player won his Test cap by playing for the Australia cricket team. Where more than one player won his first Test cap in the same Test match, those players are listed alphabetically by surname. The "baggy green" is the name given to the dark green cap with the unofficial colonial era Australian coat of arms on the front worn by the Australian Test team.

== Players ==
Statistics are correct as of 31 October 2026.

Australian Test cricketers				Batting					Bowling						Fielding	
Cap	Name	Career	Mat	Inn	NO	Runs	HS	Avg	Balls	Mdn	Runs	Wkt	Best	Avg	Ca	St
1	Charles Bannerman	1877–1879	3	6	2	239	165*	59.75	–	–	–	–	–	–	0	–
2	Jack Blackham	1877–1894	35	62	11	800	74	15.69	–	–	–	–	–	–	37	24
3	Bransby Cooper	1877	1	2	0	18	15	9.00	–	–	–	–	–	–	2	–
4	Tom Garrett	1877–1888	19	33	6	339	51*	12.56	2728	296	970	36	6/78	26.94	7	–
5	Dave Gregory	1877–1879	3	5	2	60	43	20.00	20	1	9	–	–	–	0	–
6	Ned Gregory	1877	1	2	0	11	11	5.50	–	–	–	–	–	–	1	–
7	John Hodges	1877	2	4	1	10	8	3.33	136	9	84	6	2/7	14.00	0	–
8	Tom Horan	1877–1885	15	27	2	471	124	18.84	373	45	143	11	6/40	13.00	6	–
9	Tom Kendall	1877	2	4	1	39	17*	13.00	563	56	215	14	7/55	15.36	2	–
10	Billy Midwinter	1877–1887	8 (Note: Billy Midwinter, Billy Murdoch, John Ferris, Sammy Woods and Albert Trott also played Test cricket for England. In all cases, only their records for Australia are given above.)	14	1	174	37	13.38	949	104	333	14	5/78	23.79	10	–
11	Nat Thomson	1877	2	4	0	67	41	16.75	112	16	31	1	1/14	31.00	3	–
12	Thomas Kelly	1877–1879	2	3	0	64	35	21.33	–	–	–	–	–	–	1	–
13	Billy Murdoch	1877–1890	18	33	5	896	211	32.00	–	–	–	–	–	–	14	0
14	Fred Spofforth	1877–1887	18	29	6	217	50	9.43	4185	416	1731	94	7/44	18.41	11	–
15	Frank Allan	1879	1	1	0	5	5	5.00	180	15	80	4	2/30	20.00	0	–
16	Alick Bannerman	1879–1893	28	50	2	1108	94	23.08	292	17	163	4	3/111	40.75	21	–
17	Harry Boyle	1879–1884	12	16	4	153	36*	12.75	1743	175	641	32	6/42	20.03	10	–
18	George Alexander	1880–1884	2	4	0	52	33	13.00	168	13	93	2	2/69	46.50	2	–
19	George Bonnor	1880–1888	17	30	0	512	128	17.07	164	16	84	2	1/5	42.00	16	–
20	Tom Groube	1880	1	2	0	11	11	5.50	–	–	–	–	–	–	0	–
21	Percy McDonnell	1880–1888	19	34	1	955	147	28.94	52	1	53	0	–	–	6	–
22	William Moule	1880	1	2	0	40	34	20.00	51	4	23	3	3/23	7.67	1	–
23	Joey Palmer	1880–1886	17	25	4	296	48	14.10	4517	452	1678	78	7/65	21.51	13	–
24	Jim Slight	1880	1	2	0	11	11	5.50	–	–	–	–	–	–	0	–
25	William Cooper	1882–1884	2	3	1	13	7	6.50	446	31	226	9	6/120	25.11	1	–
26	Edwin Evans	1882–1886	6	10	2	82	33	10.25	1237	166	332	7	3/64	47.43	5	–
27	George Giffen	1882–1896	31	53	0	1238	161	23.36	6391	434	2791	103	7/117	27.10	24	–
28	Hugh Massie	1882–1885	9	16	0	249	55	15.56	–	–	–	–	–	–	5	–
29	George Coulthard	1882	1	1	1	6	6*	–	–	–	–	–	–	–	0	–
30	Sammy Jones	1882–1888	12	24	4	428	87	21.40	262	26	112	6	4/47	18.67	12	–
31	Tup Scott	1884–1886	8	14	1	359	102	27.62	28	1	26	–	–	–	8	–
32	William Bruce	1885–1895	14	26	2	702	80	29.25	988	72	440	12	3/88	36.67	12	–
33	Affie Jarvis	1885–1895	11	21	3	303	82	16.83	–	–	–	–	–	–	9	9
34	Percy Marr	1885	1	2	0	5	5	2.50	48	6	14	0	–	–	0	–
35	Samuel Morris	1885	1	2	1	14	10*	14.00	136	14	73	2	2/73	36.50	–	–
36	Harry Musgrove	1885	1	2	0	13	9	6.50	–	–	–	–	–	–	0	–
37	Roland Pope	1885	1	2	0	3	3	1.50	–	–	–	–	–	–	0	–
38	Digger Robertson	1885	1	2	0	2	2	1.00	44	3	24	0	–	–	0	–
39	Billy Trumble	1885–1886	7	13	1	243	59	20.25	600	59	222	10	3/29	22.20	3	–
40	Jack Worrall	1885–1899	11	22	3	478	76	25.16	255	29	127	1	1/97	127.00	13	–
41	Patrick McShane	1885–1888	3	6	1	26	12*	5.20	108	9	48	1	1/39	48.00	2	–
42	Francis Walters	1885	1	2	0	12	7	6.00	–	–	–	–	–	–	2	–
43	John McIlwraith	1886	1	2	0	9	7	4.50	–	–	–	–	–	–	1	–
44	J. J. Ferris	1887–1890	8	16	4	98	20*	8.17	2030	224	684	48	5/26	14.25	4	–
45	Harry Moses	1887–1895	6	10	0	198	33	19.80	–	–	–	–	–	–	1	–
46	Charles Turner	1887–1895	17	32	4	323	29	11.54	5179	457	1670	101	7/43	16.53	8	–
47	Reginald Allen	1887	1	2	0	44	30	22.00	–	–	–	–	–	–	2	–
48	Frederick Burton	1887–1888	2	4	2	4	2*	2.00	–	–	–	–	–	–	1	1
49	John Cottam	1887	1	2	0	4	3	2.00	–	–	–	–	–	–	1	–
50	Walter Giffen	1887–1892	3	6	0	11	3	1.83	–	–	–	–	–	–	1	–
51	Jack Lyons	1887–1897	14	27	0	731	134	27.07	316	17	149	6	5/30	24.83	3	–
52	Jack Edwards	1888	3	6	1	48	26	9.60	–	–	–	–	–	–	1	–
53	Harry Trott	1888–1898	24	42	0	921	143	21.93	1891	47	1019	29	4/71	35.14	21	–
54	Sammy Woods	1888	3	6	0	32	18	5.33	217	18	121	5	2/35	24.20	1	–
55	Jack Barrett	1890	2	4	1	80	67*	26.67	–	–	–	–	–	–	1	–
56	Kenneth Burn	1890	2	4	0	41	19	10.25	–	–	–	–	–	–	0	–
57	Percie Charlton	1890	2	4	0	29	11	7.25	45	1	24	3	3/18	8.00	0	–
58	Syd Gregory	1890–1912	58	100	7	2282	201	24.54	30	0	33	0	–	–	25	–
59	Hugh Trumble	1890–1904	32	57	14	851	70	19.79	8099	452	3072	141	8/65	21.79	45	–
60	Sydney Callaway	1892–1895	3	6	1	87	41	17.40	471	33	142	6	5/37	23.67	–	–
61	Harry Donnan	1892–1896	5	10	1	75	15	8.33	54	2	22	0	–	–	1	–
62	Bob McLeod	1892–1893	6	11	0	146	31	13.27	1089	67	382	12	5/53	31.83	3	–
63	Harry Graham	1893–1896	6	10	0	301	107	30.10	–	–	–	–	–	–	3	–
64	Joe Darling	1894–1905	34	60	2	1657	178	28.57	–	–	–	–	–	–	27	–
65	Frank Iredale	1894–1899	14	23	1	807	140	36.68	12	1	3	0	–	–	16	–
66	Ernie Jones	1894–1902	19	26	1	126	20	5.04	3754	161	1857	64	7/88	29.02	21	–
67	Charlie McLeod	1894–1905	17	29	5	573	112	23.88	3374	171	1325	33	5/65	40.15	9	–
68	Jack Reedman	1894	1	2	0	21	17	10.50	57	2	24	1	1/12	24.00	1	–
69	Arthur Coningham	1895	1	2	0	13	10	6.50	186	9	76	2	2/17	38.00	0	–
70	John Harry	1895	1	2	0	8	6	4.00	–	–	–	–	–	–	1	–
71	Albert Trott	1895	3	5	3	205	85*	102.50	474	17	192	9	8/43	21.33	4	–
72	Tom McKibbin	1895–1898	5	8	2	88	28*	14.67	1032	41	496	17	3/35	29.18	4	–
73	Charles Eady	1896–1902	2	4	1	20	10*	6.67	223	14	112	7	3/30	16.00	2	–
74	Clem Hill	1896–1912	49	89	2	3412	191	39.22	–	–	–	–	–	–	33	–
75	Jim Kelly	1896–1905	36	56	17	664	46*	17.03	–	–	–	–	–	–	43	20
76	Monty Noble	1898–1909	42	73	7	1997	133	30.26	7159	361	3025	121	7/17	25.00	26	–
77	Bill Howell	1898–1904	18	27	6	158	35	7.52	3892	245	1407	49	5/81	28.71	12	–
78	Frank Laver	1899–1909	15	23	6	196	45	11.53	2361	121	964	37	8/31	26.05	8	–
79	Victor Trumper	1899–1912	48	89	8	3163	214*	39.05	546	20	317	8	3/60	39.63	31	–
80	Warwick Armstrong	1902–1921	50	84	10	2863	159*	38.69	8022	407	2923	87	6/35	33.60	44	–
81	Reggie Duff	1902–1905	22	40	3	1317	146	35.59	180	8	85	4	2/43	21.25	14	–
82	Bert Hopkins	1902–1909	20	33	2	509	43	16.42	1327	49	696	26	4/81	26.77	11	–
83	Jack Saunders	1902–1908	14	23	6	39	11*	2.29	3565	116	1796	79	7/34	22.73	5	–
84	Joe Travers	1902	1	2	0	10	9	5.00	48	2	14	1	1/14	14.00	1	–
85	Tibby Cotter	1904–1912	21	37	2	457	45	13.06	4633	86	2549	89	7/148	28.64	8	–
86	Peter McAlister	1904–1909	8	16	1	252	41	16.80	–	–	–	–	–	–	10	–
87	Algy Gehrs	1904–1911	6	11	0	221	67	20.09	6	0	4	0	–	–	6	–
88	Sammy Carter	1907–1921	28	47	9	873	72	22.97	–	–	–	–	–	–	44	21
89	Gerry Hazlitt	1907–1912	9	12	4	89	34*	11.13	1563	74	623	23	7/25	27.09	4	–
90	Charlie Macartney	1907–1926	35	55	4	2131	170	41.78	3561	177	1240	45	7/58	27.56	17	–
91	Vernon Ransford	1907–1912	20	38	6	1211	143*	37.84	43	3	28	1	1/9	28.00	10	–
92	Roger Hartigan	1908	2	4	0	170	116	42.50	12	0	7	0	–	–	1	–
93	Jack O'Connor	1908–1909	4	8	1	86	20	12.29	692	24	340	13	5/40	26.15	3	–
94	Warren Bardsley	1909–1926	41	66	5	2469	193*	40.48	–	–	–	–	–	–	12	–
95	Bill Whitty	1909–1912	14	19	7	161	39*	13.42	3357	163	1373	65	6/17	21.12	4	–
96	Charlie Kelleway	1910–1928	26	42	4	1422	147	37.42	4363	146	1683	52	5/33	32.37	24	–
97	H. V. Hordern	1911–1912	7	13	2	254	50	23.09	2148	49	1075	46	7/90	23.37	6	–
98	Roy Minnett	1911–1912	9	15	0	391	90	26.07	589	26	290	11	4/34	26.36	0	–
99	Jimmy Matthews	1912	8	10	1	153	53	17.00	1081	46	419	16	4/29	26.19	7	–
100	John McLaren	1912	1	2	2	0	0*	–	144	3	70	1	1/23	70.00	0	–
101	Barlow Carkeek	1912	6	5	2	16	6*	5.33	–	–	–	–	–	–	6	0
102	Sid Emery	1912	4	2	0	6	5	3.00	462	13	249	5	2/46	49.80	2	–
103	Claude Jennings	1912	6	8	2	107	32	17.83	–	–	–	–	–	–	5	–
104	David Smith	1912	2	3	1	30	24*	15.00	–	–	–	–	–	–	–	–
105	Edgar Mayne	1912–1921	4	4	1	64	25*	21.33	6	0	1	0	–	–	2	–
106	Herbie Collins	1920–1926	19	31	1	1352	203	45.07	654	31	252	4	2/47	63.00	13	–
107	Jack Gregory	1920–1928	24	34	3	1146	119	36.97	5582	138	2648	85	7/69	31.15	37	–
108	Arthur Mailey	1920–1926	21	29	9	222	46*	11.10	6119	115	3358	99	9/121	33.92	14	–
109	Bert Oldfield	1920–1937	54	80	17	1427	65*	22.65	–	–	–	–	–	–	78	52
110	Nip Pellew	1920–1921	10	14	1	484	116	37.23	78	3	34	0	–	–	4	–
111	Jack Ryder	1920–1929	20	32	5	1394	201*	51.63	1897	71	743	17	2/20	43.71	17	–
112	Johnny Taylor	1920–1926	20	28	0	997	108	35.61	114	5	45	1	1/25	45.00	11	–
113	Roy Park	1921	1	1	0	0	0	0.00	6	0	9	0	–	–	0	–
114	Ted McDonald	1921	11	12	5	116	36	16.57	2885	90	1431	43	5/32	33.28	3	–
115	Tommy Andrews	1921–1926	16	23	1	592	94	26.91	156	5	116	1	1/23	116.00	12	–
116	Hunter Hendry	1921–1929	11	18	2	335	112	20.94	1706	73	640	16	3/36	40.00	10	–
117	Bill Ponsford	1924–1934	29	48	4	2122	266	48.23	–	–	–	–	–	–	21	–
118	Arthur Richardson	1924–1926	9	13	0	403	100	31.00	1812	91	521	12	2/20	43.42	1	–
119	Vic Richardson	1924–1936	19	30	0	706	138	23.53	–	–	–	–	–	–	24	–
120	Albert Hartkopf	1925	1	2	0	80	80	40.00	240	2	134	1	1/120	134.00	0	–
121	Clarrie Grimmett	1925–1936	37	50	10	557	50	13.93	14513	736	5231	216	7/40	24.22	17	–
122	Alan Kippax	1925–1934	22	34	1	1192	146	36.12	72	5	19	0	–	–	13	–
123	Bill Woodfull	1926–1934	35	54	4	2300	161	46.00	–	–	–	–	–	–	7	–
124	Don Bradman	1928–1948	52	80	10	6996	334	99.94	160	3	72	2	1/8	36.00	32	–
125	Bert Ironmonger	1928–1933	14	21	5	42	12	2.63	4695	328	1330	74	7/23	17.97	3	–
126	Don Blackie	1928–1929	3	6	3	24	11*	8.00	1260	51	444	14	6/94	31.71	2	–
127	Otto Nothling	1928	1	2	0	52	44	26.00	276	15	72	0	–	–	0	–
128	Ted à Beckett	1929–1932	4	7	–	143	41	20.43	1062	47	317	3	1/41	105.67	4	–
129	Ron Oxenham	1929–1931	7	10	–	151	48	15.10	1802	112	522	14	4/39	37.29	4	–
130	Archie Jackson	1929–1931	8	11	1	474	164	47.40	–	–	–	–	–	–	7	–
131	Alan Fairfax	1929–1931	10	12	4	410	65	51.25	1520	54	645	21	4/31	30.71	15	–
132	Percy Hornibrook	1929–1930	6	7	1	60	26	10.00	1579	63	664	17	7/92	39.06	7	–
133	Tim Wall	1929–1934	18	24	5	121	20	6.37	4812	154	2010	56	5/14	35.89	11	–
134	Stan McCabe	1930–1938	39	62	5	2748	232	48.21	3746	127	1543	36	4/13	42.86	41	–
135	Alec Hurwood	1930–1931	2	2	0	5	5	2.50	517	28	170	11	4/22	15.45	2	–
136	Keith Rigg	1931–1937	8	12	0	401	127	33.42	–	–	–	–	–	–	5	–
137	Jack Nitschke	1931	2	2	0	53	47	26.50	–	–	–	–	–	–	3	–
138	Philip Lee	1931–1933	2	3	0	57	42	19.00	436	19	212	5	4/111	42.40	1	–
139	Bill Hunt	1932	1	1	0	0	0	0.00	96	2	39	0	–	–	1	–
140	Bill O'Reilly	1932–1946	27	39	7	410	56*	12.81	10024	585	3254	144	7/54	22.60	7	–
141	Pud Thurlow	1932	1	1	0	0	0	0.00	234	7	86	0	–	–	0	–
142	Jack Fingleton	1932–1938	18	29	1	1189	136	42.46	–	–	–	–	–	–	13	–
143	Laurie Nash	1932–1937	2	2	0	30	17	15.00	311	12	126	10	4/18	12.60	6	–
144	Lisle Nagel	1932	1	2	1	21	21*	21.00	262	9	110	2	2/110	55.00	0	–
145	Leo O'Brien	1933–1936	5	8	0	211	61	26.38	–	–	–	–	–	–	3	–
146	Ernest Bromley	1933–1934	2	4	0	38	26	9.50	60	4	19	0	–	–	2	–
147	Len Darling	1933–1937	12	18	1	474	85	27.88	162	7	65	0	–	–	8	–
148	Hammy Love	1933	1	2	0	8	5	4.00	–	–	–	–	–	–	3	0
149	Harry Alexander	1933	1	2	1	17	17*	17.00	276	3	154	1	1/129	154.00	0	–
150	Bill Brown	1934–1948	22	35	1	1592	206*	46.82	–	–	–	–	–	–	14	–
151	Arthur Chipperfield	1934–1938	14	20	3	552	109	32.47	924	28	437	5	3/91	87.40	15	–
152	Hans Ebeling	1934	1	2	0	43	41	21.50	186	9	89	3	3/74	29.67	0	–
153	Chuck Fleetwood-Smith	1935–1938	10	11	5	54	16*	9.00	3093	78	1570	42	6/110	37.38	0	–
154	Ernie McCormick	1935–1938	12	14	5	54	17*	6.00	2107	50	1079	36	4/101	29.97	8	–
155	Jack Badcock	1936–1938	7	12	1	160	118	14.55	–	–	–	–	–	–	3	–
156	Ray Robinson	1936	1	2	0	5	3	2.50	–	–	–	–	–	–	1	–
157	Morris Sievers	1936–1937	3	6	1	67	25*	13.40	602	25	161	9	5/21	17.89	4	–
158	Frank Ward	1936–1938	4	8	2	36	18	6.00	1268	30	574	11	6/102	52.18	1	–
159	Ross Gregory	1937	2	3	0	153	80	51.00	24	0	14	0	–	–	1	–
160	Ben Barnett	1938	4	8	1	195	57	27.86	–	–	–	–	–	–	3	2
161	Lindsay Hassett	1938–1953	43	69	3	3073	198*	46.56	111	2	78	0	–	–	30	–
162	Mervyn Waite	1938	2	3	0	11	8	3.67	552	23	190	1	1/150	190.00	1	–
163	Sid Barnes	1938–1948	13	19	2	1072	234	63.06	594	11	218	4	2/25	54.50	14	–
164	Ian Johnson	1946–1956	45	66	12	1000	77	18.52	8780	330	3182	109	7/44	29.19	30	–
165	Ray Lindwall	1946–1960	61	84	13	1502	118	21.15	13650	419	5251	228	7/38	23.03	26	–
166	Colin McCool	1946–1950	14	17	4	459	104*	35.31	2504	44	958	36	5/41	26.61	14	–
167	Ken Meuleman	1946	1	1	0	0	0	0.00	–	–	–	–	–	–	1	–
168	Keith Miller	1946–1956	55	87	7	2958	147	36.98	10461	337	3906	170	7/60	22.98	38	–
169	Don Tallon	1946–1953	21	26	3	394	92	17.13	–	–	–	–	–	–	50	8
170	Ernie Toshack	1946–1948	12	11	6	73	20*	14.60	3140	155	989	47	6/29	21.04	4	–
171	Arthur Morris	1946–1955	46	79	3	3533	206	46.49	111	1	50	2	1/5	25.00	15	–
172	George Tribe	1946–1947	3	3	1	35	25*	17.50	760	9	330	2	2/48	165.00	0	–
173	Fred Freer	1946	1	1	1	28	28*	–	160	3	74	3	2/49	24.67	0	–
174	Bruce Dooland	1947–1948	3	5	1	76	29	19.00	880	9	419	9	4/69	46.56	3	–
175	Merv Harvey	1947	1	2	0	43	31	21.50	–	–	–	–	–	–	0	–
176	Ron Hamence	1947–1948	3	4	1	81	30*	27.00	–	–	–	–	–	–	1	–
177	Bill Johnston	1947–1955	40	49	25	273	29	11.38	11048	372	3826	160	6/44	23.91	16	–
178	Neil Harvey	1948–1963	79	137	10	6149	205	48.42	414	23	120	3	1/8	40.00	64	–
179	Len Johnson	1948	1	1	1	25	25*	–	282	10	74	6	3/8	12.33	2	–
180	Sam Loxton	1948–1951	12	15	0	554	101	36.93	906	20	349	8	3/55	43.63	7	–
181	Doug Ring	1948–1953	13	21	2	426	67	22.42	3024	69	1305	35	6/72	37.29	5	–
182	Ron Saggers	1948–1950	6	5	2	30	14	10.00	–	–	–	–	–	–	16	8
183	Jack Moroney	1949–1952	7	12	1	383	118	34.82	–	–	–	–	–	–	0	–
184	Geff Noblet	1950–1953	3	4	1	22	13*	7.33	774	25	183	7	3/21	26.14	1	–
185	Jack Iverson	1950–1951	5	7	3	3	1*	0.75	1108	29	320	21	6/27	15.24	2	–
186	Ken Archer	1950–1951	5	9	0	234	48	26.00	–	–	–	–	–	–	0	–
187	Jim Burke	1951–1959	24	44	7	1280	189	34.59	814	41	230	8	4/37	28.75	18	–
188	Graeme Hole	1951–1955	18	33	2	789	66	25.45	398	14	126	3	1/9	42.00	21	–
189	Gil Langley	1951–1956	26	37	12	374	53	14.96	–	–	–	–	–	–	83	15
190	Richie Benaud	1952–1964	63	97	7	2201	122	24.46	19108	805	6704	248	7/72	27.03	65	–
191	Colin McDonald	1952–1961	47	83	4	3107	170	39.33	8	0	3	0	–	–	14	–
192	George Thoms	1952	1	2	0	44	28	22.00	–	–	–	–	–	–	0	–
193	Ron Archer	1953–1956	19	30	1	713	128	24.59	3576	160	1318	48	5/53	27.46	20	–
194	Ian Craig	1953–1958	11	18	0	358	53	19.89	–	–	–	–	–	–	2	–
195	Alan Davidson	1953–1963	44	61	7	1328	80	24.59	11587	431	3819	186	7/93	20.53	42	–
196	Jack Hill	1953–1955	3	6	3	21	8*	7.00	606	29	273	8	3/35	34.13	2	–
197	Jim de Courcy	1953	3	6	1	81	41	16.20	–	–	–	–	–	–	3	–
198	Les Favell	1954–1961	19	31	3	757	101	27.04	–	–	–	–	–	–	9	–
199	Len Maddocks	1955–1956	7	12	2	177	69	17.70	–	–	–	–	–	–	18	1
200	Peter Burge	1955–1966	42	68	8	2290	181	38.17	–	–	–	–	–	–	23	–
201	Bill Watson	1955	4	7	1	106	30	17.67	6	0	5	0	–	–	2	–
202	Pat Crawford	1956	4	5	2	53	34	17.67	437	27	107	7	3/28	15.29	1	–
203	Ken Mackay	1956–1963	37	52	7	1507	89	33.49	5792	267	1721	50	6/42	34.42	16	–
204	John Rutherford	1956	1	1	0	30	30	30.00	36	2	15	1	1/11	15.00	0	–
205	Jack Wilson	1956	1	–	–	–	–	–	216	17	64	1	1/25	64.00	0	–
206	Wally Grout	1957–1966	51	67	8	890	74	15.08	–	–	–	–	–	–	163	24
207	Lindsay Kline	1957–1961	13	16	9	58	15*	8.29	2373	113	776	34	7/75	22.82	9	–
208	Ian Meckiff	1957–1963	18	20	7	154	45*	11.85	3734	120	1423	45	6/38	31.62	9	–
209	Bob Simpson	1957–1978	62	111	7	4869	311	46.82	6881	253	3001	71	5/57	42.27	110	–
210	Ron Gaunt	1958–1964	3	4	2	6	3	3.00	716	14	310	7	3/53	44.29	1	–
211	Norm O'Neill	1958–1965	42	69	8	2779	181	45.56	1392	48	667	17	4/41	39.24	21	–
212	Keith Slater	1959	1	1	1	1	1*	–	256	9	101	2	2/40	50.50	0	–
213	Gordon Rorke	1959	4	4	2	9	7	4.50	703	26	203	10	3/23	20.30	1	–
214	Gavin Stevens	1959–1960	4	7	0	112	28	16.00	–	–	–	–	–	–	2	–
215	Barry Jarman	1959–1969	19	30	3	400	78	14.81	–	–	–	–	–	–	50	4
216	Johnny Martin	1961–1967	8	13	1	214	55	17.83	1846	57	832	17	3/56	48.94	5	–
217	Frank Misson	1961	5	5	3	38	25*	19.00	1197	30	616	16	4/58	38.50	6	–
218	Des Hoare	1961	1	2	0	35	35	17.50	232	0	156	2	2/68	78.00	2	–
219	Bill Lawry	1961–1971	67	123	12	5234	210	47.15	14	1	6	0	–	–	30	–
220	Graham McKenzie	1961–1971	60	89	12	945	76	12.27	17681	547	7328	246	8/71	29.79	34	–
221	Brian Booth	1961–1966	29	48	6	1773	169	42.21	436	27	146	3	2/33	48.67	17	–
222	Colin Guest	1963	1	1	0	11	11	11.00	144	0	59	0	–	–	0	–
223	Barry Shepherd	1963–1965	9	14	2	502	96	41.83	26	1	9	0	–	–	2	–
224	Neil Hawke	1963–1968	27	37	15	365	45*	16.59	6974	238	2677	91	7/105	29.42	9	–
225	Alan Connolly	1963–1971	29	45	20	260	37	10.40	7818	289	2981	102	6/47	29.23	17	–
226	Tom Veivers	1963–1967	21	30	4	813	88	31.27	4191	195	1375	33	4/68	41.67	7	–
227	Ian Redpath	1964–1976	66	120	11	4737	171	43.46	64	2	41	0	–	–	83	–
228	Grahame Corling	1964	5	4	1	5	3	1.67	1159	50	447	12	4/60	37.25	0	–
229	Bob Cowper	1964–1968	27	46	2	2061	307	46.84	3005	138	1139	36	4/48	31.64	21	–
230	Rex Sellers	1964	1	1	0	0	0	0.00	30	1	17	0	–	–	1	–
231	Ian Chappell	1964–1980	75	136	10	5345	196	42.42	2873	87	1316	20	2/21	65.80	105	–
232	David Sincock	1964–1966	3	4	1	80	29	26.67	724	7	410	8	3/67	51.25	2	–
233	Laurie Mayne	1965–1970	6	11	3	76	13	9.50	1251	37	628	19	4/43	33.05	3	–
234	Peter Philpott	1965–1966	8	10	1	93	22	10.33	2262	67	1000	26	5/90	38.46	5	–
235	Grahame Thomas	1965–1966	8	12	1	325	61	29.55	–	–	–	–	–	–	3	–
236	Peter Allan	1965	1	–	–	–	–	–	192	6	83	2	2/58	41.50	0	–
237	Doug Walters	1965–1981	74	125	14	5357	250	48.26	3295	79	1425	49	5/66	29.08	43	–
238	Keith Stackpole	1966–1974	43	80	5	2807	207	37.43	2321	86	1001	15	2/33	66.73	47	–
239	David Renneberg	1966–1968	8	13	7	22	9	3.67	1598	42	830	23	5/39	36.09	2	–
240	Brian Taber	1966–1970	16	27	5	353	48	16.05	–	–	–	–	–	–	56	4
241	Graeme Watson	1967–1972	5	9	0	97	50	10.78	552	23	254	6	2/67	42.33	1	–
242	John Gleeson	1967–1972	29	46	8	395	45	10.39	8857	378	3367	93	5/61	36.20	17	–
243	Paul Sheahan	1967–1974	31	53	6	1594	127	33.91	–	–	–	–	–	–	17	–
244	Eric Freeman	1968–1970	11	18	0	345	76	19.17	2183	58	1128	34	4/52	33.18	5	–
245	Les Joslin	1968	1	2	0	9	7	4.50	–	–	–	–	–	–	0	–
246	John Inverarity	1968–1972	6	11	1	174	56	17.40	372	26	93	4	3/26	23.25	4	–
247	Ashley Mallett	1968–1980	38	50	13	430	43*	11.62	9990	419	3940	132	8/59	29.85	30	–
248	Terry Jenner	1970–1975	9	14	5	208	74	23.11	1881	62	749	24	5/90	31.21	5	–
249	Rod Marsh	1970–1984	96	150	13	3633	132	26.52	72	1	54	0	–	–	343	12
250	Alan Thomson	1970–1971	4	5	4	22	12*	22.00	1519	33	654	12	3/79	54.50	0	–
251	Greg Chappell	1970–1984	87	151	19	7110	247*	53.86	5327	208	1913	47	5/61	40.70	122	–
252	Ross Duncan	1971	1	1	0	3	3	3.00	112	4	30	0	–	–	0	–
253	Kerry O'Keeffe	1971–1977	24	34	9	644	85	25.76	5384	189	2018	53	5/101	38.08	15	–
254	Dennis Lillee	1971–1984	70	90	24	905	73*	13.71	18467	652	8493	355	7/83	23.92	23	–
255	Tony Dell	1971–1974	2	2	2	6	3*	–	559	18	160	6	3/65	26.67	0	–
256	Ken Eastwood	1971	1	2	0	5	5	2.50	40	0	21	1	1/21	21.00	0	–
257	David Colley	1972	3	4	0	84	54	21.00	729	20	312	6	3/83	52.00	1	–
258	Bruce Francis	1972	3	5	0	52	27	10.40	–	–	–	–	–	–	1	–
259	Ross Edwards	1972–1975	20	32	3	1171	170*	40.38	12	–	20	–	–	–	7	–
260	Bob Massie	1972–1973	6	8	1	78	42	11.14	1739	74	647	31	8/53	20.87	1	–
261	John Benaud	1972–1973	3	5	0	223	142	44.60	24	1	12	2	2/12	6.00	–	–
262	Jeff Thomson	1973–1985	51	73	20	679	49	12.81	10535	301	5601	200	6/46	28.01	20	–
263	Max Walker	1973–1977	34	43	13	586	78*	19.53	10094	380	3792	138	8/143	27.48	12	–
264	John Watkins	1973	1	2	1	39	36	39.00	48	1	21	0	–	–	1	–
265	Jeff Hammond	1973	5	5	2	28	19	9.33	1031	47	488	15	4/38	32.53	2	–
266	Ian Davis	1974–1977	15	27	1	692	105	26.62	–	–	–	–	–	–	9	–
267	Gary Gilmour	1974–1977	15	22	1	483	101	23.00	2661	51	1406	54	6/85	26.04	8	–
268	Geoff Dymock	1974–1980	21	32	7	236	31*	9.44	5545	179	2116	78	7/67	27.13	1	–
269	Alan Hurst	1974–1979	12	20	3	102	26	6.00	3054	74	1200	43	5/28	27.91	3	–
270	Ashley Woodcock	1974	1	1	0	27	27	27.00	–	–	–	–	–	–	1	–
271	Wally Edwards	1974	3	6	0	68	30	11.33	–	–	–	–	–	–	0	–
272	Rick McCosker	1975–1980	25	46	5	1622	127	39.56	–	–	–	–	–	–	21	–
273	Alan Turner	1975–1977	14	27	1	768	136	29.54	–	–	–	–	–	–	15	–
274	Gary Cosier	1975–1978	18	32	1	897	168	28.94	899	30	341	5	2/26	68.20	14	–
275	Graham Yallop	1976–1984	39	70	3	2756	268	41.13	192	5	116	1	1/21	116.00	23	–
276	David Hookes	1977–1985	23	41	3	1306	143*	34.37	96	4	41	1	1/4	41.00	12	–
277	Len Pascoe	1977–1982	14	19	9	106	30*	10.60	3403	112	1668	64	5/59	26.06	2	–
278	Richie Robinson	1977	3	6	0	100	34	16.67	–	–	–	–	–	–	4	–
279	Craig Serjeant	1977–1978	12	23	1	522	124	23.73	–	–	–	–	–	–	13	–
280	Ray Bright	1977–1986	25	39	8	445	33	14.35	5541	298	2180	53	7/87	41.13	13	–
281	Kim Hughes	1977–1984	70	124	6	4415	213	37.42	85	4	28	0	–	–	50	–
282	Mick Malone	1977	1	1	0	46	46	46.00	342	24	77	6	5/63	12.83	0	–
283	Wayne Clark	1977–1979	10	19	2	98	33	5.76	2793	63	1265	44	4/46	28.75	6	–
284	Paul Hibbert	1977	1	2	0	15	13	7.50	–	–	–	–	–	–	1	–
285	Tony Mann	1977–1978	4	8	0	189	105	23.63	552	4	316	4	3/12	79.00	2	–
286	David Ogilvie	1977–1978	5	10	0	178	47	17.80	–	–	–	–	–	–	5	–
287	Steve Rixon	1977–1985	13	24	3	394	54	18.76	–	–	–	–	–	–	42	5
288	Peter Toohey	1977–1980	15	29	1	893	122	31.89	2	0	4	0	–	–	9	–
289	John Dyson	1977–1984	30	58	7	1359	127*	26.65	–	–	–	–	–	–	10	–
290	Sam Gannon	1977–1978	3	5	4	3	3*	3.00	726	13	361	11	4/77	32.82	3	–
291	Ian Callen	1978	1	2	2	26	22*	–	440	5	191	6	3/83	31.83	1	–
292	Rick Darling	1978–1979	14	27	1	697	91	26.81	–	–	–	–	–	–	5	–
293	Graeme Wood	1978–1988	59	112	6	3374	172	31.83	–	–	–	–	–	–	41	–
294	Bruce Yardley	1978–1983	33	54	4	978	74	19.56	8909	379	3986	126	7/98	31.63	31	–
295	Jim Higgs	1978–1981	22	36	16	111	16	5.55	4752	176	2057	66	7/143	31.17	3	–
296	Trevor Laughlin	1978	3	5	0	87	35	17.40	516	16	262	6	5/101	43.67	3	–
297	Rodney Hogg	1978–1984	38	58	13	439	52	9.76	7633	230	3503	123	6/74	28.48	7	–
298	John Maclean	1978–1979	4	8	1	79	33*	11.29	–	–	–	–	–	–	18	0
299	Allan Border	1978–1994	156	265	44	11174	205	50.56	4009	197	1525	39	7/46	39.10	156	–
300	Phil Carlson	1979	2	4	0	23	21	5.75	368	10	99	2	2/41	49.50	2	–
301	Kevin Wright	1979	10	18	5	219	55*	16.85	–	–	–	–	–	–	31	4
302	Andrew Hilditch	1979–1985	18	34	0	1073	119	31.56	–	–	–	–	–	–	13	–
303	Peter Sleep	1979–1990	14	21	1	483	90	24.15	2982	132	1397	31	5/72	45.06	4	–
304	Dav Whatmore	1979	7	13	0	293	77	22.54	30	2	11	0	–	–	13	–
305	Jeff Moss	1979	1	2	1	60	38*	60.00	–	–	–	–	–	–	–	–
306	Bruce Laird	1979–1982	21	40	2	1341	92	35.29	18	1	12	0	–	–	16	–
307	Julien Wiener	1979–1980	6	11	0	281	93	25.55	78	4	41	0	–	–	4	–
308	Graeme Beard	1980	3	5	0	114	49	22.80	259	17	109	1	1/26	109.00	0	–
309	Geoff Lawson	1980–1989	46	68	12	894	74	15.96	11118	386	5501	180	8/112	30.56	10	–
310	Terry Alderman	1981–1991	41	53	22	203	26*	6.55	10181	432	4616	170	6/47	27.15	27	–
311	Trevor Chappell	1981	3	6	1	79	27	15.80	–	–	–	–	–	–	2	–
312	Martin Kent	1981	3	6	0	171	54	28.50	–	–	–	–	–	–	6	–
313	Mike Whitney	1981–1992	12	19	8	68	13	6.18	2672	90	1325	39	7/27	33.97	2	–
314	Dirk Wellham	1981–1987	6	11	0	257	103	23.36	–	–	–	–	–	–	5	–
315	Greg Ritchie	1982–1987	30	53	5	1690	146	35.21	6	0	10	0	–	–	14	–
316	Carl Rackemann	1982–1991	12	14	4	53	15*	5.30	2719	132	1137	39	6/86	29.15	2	–
317	Kepler Wessels	1982–1985	24 (Note: Kepler Wessels also played for South Africa. Only his records for Australia are given above.)	42	1	1761	179	42.95	90	3	42	0	–	–	20	–
318	Tom Hogan	1983–1984	7	12	1	205	42*	18.64	1436	54	706	15	5/66	47.07	2	–
319	Roger Woolley	1983–1984	2	2	0	21	13	10.50	–	–	–	–	–	–	7	0
320	Wayne B. Phillips	1983–1986	27	48	2	1485	159	32.28	–	–	–	–	–	–	52	0
321	John Maguire	1983–1984	3	5	1	28	15*	7.00	616	21	323	10	4/57	32.30	2	–
322	Greg Matthews	1983–1993	33	53	8	1849	130	41.09	6271	256	2942	61	5/103	48.23	17	–
323	Steve Smith	1984	3	5	0	41	12	8.20	–	–	–	–	–	–	1	–
324	Dean Jones	1984–1992	52	89	11	3631	216	46.55	198	15	64	1	1/5	64.00	34	–
325	David Boon	1984–1996	107	190	20	7422	200	43.66	36	3	14	–	–	–	99	–
326	Bob Holland	1984–1986	11	15	4	35	10	3.18	2889	124	1352	34	6/54	39.76	5	–
327	Murray Bennett	1984–1985	3	5	2	71	23	23.67	665	24	325	6	3/79	54.17	5	–
328	Craig McDermott	1984–1996	71	90	13	940	42*	12.21	16586	579	8332	291	8/97	28.63	19	–
329	Simon O'Donnell	1985	6	10	3	206	48	29.43	940	37	504	6	3/37	84.00	4	–
330	Dave Gilbert	1985–1986	9	12	4	57	15	7.13	1647	49	843	16	3/48	52.69	0	–
331	Robbie Kerr	1985	2	4	0	31	17	7.75	–	–	–	–	–	–	1	–
332	Merv Hughes	1985–1994	53	70	8	1032	72*	16.65	12285	499	6017	212	8/87	28.38	23	–
333	Geoff Marsh	1985–1992	50	93	7	2854	138	33.19	–	–	–	–	–	–	38	–
334	Bruce Reid	1985–1992	27	34	14	93	13	4.65	6244	244	2784	113	7/51	24.64	5	–
335	Steve Waugh	1985–2004	168	260	46	10927	200	51.06	7805	332	3445	92	5/28	37.45	112	–
336	Simon Davis	1986	1	1	0	0	0	0.00	150	4	70	0	–	–	0	–
337	Tim Zoehrer	1986–1987	10	14	2	246	52*	20.50	–	–	–	–	–	–	18	1
338	Chris Matthews	1986–1988	3	5	0	54	32	10.80	570	18	313	6	3/95	52.17	1	–
339	Greg Dyer	1986–1988	6	6	0	131	60	21.83	–	–	–	–	–	–	22	2
340	Peter Taylor	1987–1991	13	19	3	431	87	26.94	2227	101	1068	27	6/78	39.56	10	–
341	Mike Veletta	1987–1990	8	11	0	207	39	18.82	–	–	–	–	–	–	12	–
342	Tim May	1987–1995	24	28	12	225	42*	14.06	6577	321	2606	75	5/9	34.75	6	–
343	Tony Dodemaide	1987–1992	10	15	6	202	50	22.44	2184	92	953	34	6/58	28.03	6	–
344	Ian Healy	1988–1999	119	182	23	4356	161*	27.40	–	–	–	–	–	–	366	29
345	Trevor Hohns	1989	7	7	1	136	40	22.67	1528	84	580	17	3/59	34.12	3	–
346	Mark Taylor	1989–1999	104	186	13	7525	334*	43.50	42	3	26	1	1/11	26.00	157	–
347	Greg Campbell	1989–1990	4	4	0	10	6	2.50	951	29	503	13	3/79	38.69	1	–
348	Tom Moody	1989–1992	8	14	0	456	106	32.57	432	19	147	2	1/17	73.50	9	–
349	Mark Waugh	1991–2002	128	209	17	8029	153*	41.82	4853	171	2429	59	5/40	41.17	181	–
350	Shane Warne	1992–2007	145	199	17	3154	99	17.32	40704	1761	17995	708	8/71	25.41	125	–
351	Wayne N. Phillips	1992	1	2	0	22	14	11.00	–	–	–	–	–	–	0	–
352	Paul Reiffel	1992–1998	35	50	14	955	79*	26.53	6403	279	2804	104	6/71	26.96	15	–
353	Damien Martyn	1992–2006	67	109	14	4406	165	46.37	348	16	168	2	1/0	84.00	36	–
354	Justin Langer	1993–2007	105	182	12	7696	250	45.27	6	0	3	0	–	–	73	–
355	Jo Angel	1993–1995	4	7	1	35	11	5.83	748	24	463	10	3/54	46.30	1	–
356	Brendon Julian	1993–1995	7	9	1	128	56*	16.00	1098	43	599	15	4/36	39.93	4	–
357	Michael Slater	1993–2001	74	131	7	5312	219	42.84	25	1	10	1	1/4	10.00	33	–
358	Glenn McGrath	1993–2007	124	138	51	641	61	7.36	29248	1470	12186	563	8/24	21.64	38	–
359	Matthew Hayden	1994–2009	103	184	14	8625	380	50.74	54	0	40	0	–	–	128	–
360	Michael Bevan	1994–1998	18	30	3	785	91	29.07	1285	30	703	29	6/82	24.24	8	–
361	Damien Fleming	1994–2001	20	19	3	305	71*	19.06	4129	153	1942	75	5/30	25.89	9	–
362	Phil Emery	1994	1	1	1	8	8*	–	–	–	–	–	–	–	5	1
363	Greg Blewett	1995–2000	46	79	4	2552	214	34.03	1436	60	720	14	2/9	51.43	45	–
364	Peter McIntyre	1995–1996	2	4	1	22	16	7.33	393	10	194	5	3/103	38.80	0	–
365	Stuart Law	1995	1	1	1	54	54*	–	18	1	9	0	–	–	1	–
366	Ricky Ponting	1995–2012	168	287	29	13378	257	51.85	587	24	276	5	1/0	55.20	196	–
367	Brad Hogg	1996–2008	7	10	3	186	79	26.57	1524	40	933	17	4/133	54.88	1	–
368	Matthew Elliott	1996–2004	21	36	1	1172	199	33.49	12	1	4	0	–	–	14	–
369	Michael Kasprowicz	1996–2006	38	54	12	445	25	10.60	7140	245	3716	113	7/36	32.89	16	–
370	Jason Gillespie	1996–2006	71	93	28	1218	201*	18.74	14234	630	6770	259	7/37	26.14	27	–
371	Andy Bichel	1997–2003	19	22	1	355	71	16.90	3336	111	1870	58	5/60	32.24	16	–
372	Shaun Young	1997	1	2	1	4	4*	4.00	48	3	13	0	–	–	0	–
373	Simon Cook	1997	2	2	2	3	3*	–	224	10	142	7	5/39	20.29	0	–
374	Stuart MacGill	1998–2008	44	47	11	349	43	9.69	11237	365	6038	208	8/108	29.02	16	–
375	Gavin Robertson	1998	4	7	0	140	57	20.00	898	19	515	13	4/72	39.62	1	–
376	Paul Wilson	1998	1	2	2	0	0*	–	72	2	50	0	–	–	0	–
377	Adam Dale	1998–1999	2	3	0	6	5	2.00	348	19	187	6	3/71	31.17	0	–
378	Darren Lehmann	1998–2004	27	42	2	1798	177	44.95	974	36	412	15	3/42	27.47	11	–
379	Colin Miller	1998–2001	18	24	3	174	43	8.29	4091	163	1805	69	5/32	26.16	6	–
380	Matthew Nicholson	1998	1	2	0	14	9	7.00	150	4	115	4	3/56	28.75	0	–
381	Adam Gilchrist	1999–2008	96	137	20	5570	204*	47.60	–	–	–	–	–	–	379	37
382	Scott Muller	1999	2	2	2	6	6*	–	348	8	258	7	3/68	36.86	2	–
383	Brett Lee	1999–2008	76	90	18	1451	64	20.15	16531	547	9554	310	5/30	30.81	23	–
384	Simon Katich	2001–2010	56	99	6	4188	157	45.03	1039	15	653	21	6/65	30.23	39	–
385	Martin Love	2002–2003	5	8	3	233	100*	46.60	–	–	–	–	–	–	7	–
386	Brad Williams	2003–2004	4	6	3	23	10*	7.66	852	0	406	9	4/53	45.1	4	–
387	Nathan Bracken	2003–2005	5	6	2	70	37	17.50	1110	53	505	12	4/48	42.08	2	–
388	Andrew Symonds	2004–2009	26	41	5	1462	162*	40.61	2094	81	896	24	3/50	37.22	22	–
389	Michael Clarke	2004–2015	115	198	22	8643	329*	49.10	2435	62	1184	31	6/9	38.19	134	–
390	Nathan Hauritz	2004–2010	17	24	7	426	75	25.05	4200	143	2205	63	5/53	34.98	3	–
391	Shane Watson	2005–2015	59	99	3	3731	176	35.20	5495	240	2526	75	6/33	33.68	45	–
392	Shaun Tait	2005–2008	3	5	2	20	8	6.66	414	6	302	5	3/97	60.40	1	–
393	Michael Hussey	2005–2013	79	137	16	6235	195	51.52	588	4	306	7	1/0	43.71	85	–
394	Brad Hodge	2005–2008	6	11	2	503	203*	55.88	12	0	8	0	–	–	9	–
395	Phil Jaques	2005–2008	11	19	0	902	150	47.47	–	–	–	–	–	–	7	–
396	Stuart Clark	2006–2009	24	26	7	248	39	13.05	5146	230	2243	94	5/32	23.86	4	–
397	Dan Cullen	2006	1	–	–	–	–	–	84	0	54	1	1/25	54.00	0	–
398	Mitchell Johnson	2007–2015	73	109	16	2065	123*	22.20	16001	514	8891	313	8/61	28.40	27	–
399	Chris Rogers	2008–2015	25	48	1	2015	173	42.87	–	–	–	–	–	–	15	–
400	Brad Haddin	2008–2015	66	112	13	3266	169	32.98	–	–	–	–	–	–	262	8
401	Beau Casson	2008	1	1	–	10	10	10.00	192	4	129	3	3/86	43.00	2	–
402	Cameron White	2008	4	7	2	146	46	29.20	558	8	342	5	2/71	68.40	1	–
403	Peter Siddle	2008–2019	67	94	15	1164	51	14.73	13907	615	6777	221	6/54	30.66	19	–
404	Jason Krejza	2008	2	4	1	71	32	23.66	743	8	562	13	8/215	43.23	4	–
405	Doug Bollinger	2009–2010	12	14	7	54	21	7.71	2401	78	1296	50	5/28	25.92	2	–
406	Andrew McDonald	2009	4	6	1	107	68	21.40	732	40	300	9	3/25	33.33	2	–
407	Ben Hilfenhaus	2009–2012	27	38	12	355	56*	13.65	6078	258	2822	99	5/75	28.50	7	–
408	Phillip Hughes	2009–2013	26	49	2	1535	160	32.65	–	–	–	–	–	–	15	–
409	Marcus North	2009–2010	21	35	2	1171	128	35.48	1258	37	591	14	6/55	42.21	17	–
410	Bryce McGain	2009	1	2	0	2	2	1.00	108	2	148	0	–	–	0	–
411	Graham Manou	2009	1	2	1	21	13*	21.00	–	–	–	–	–	–	3	0
412	Clint McKay	2009	1	1	0	10	10	10.00	168	5	101	1	1/56	101.00	1	–
413	Ryan Harris	2010–2015	27	37	10	578	74	19.32	5472	233	2528	111	7/117	22.77	13	–
414	Tim Paine	2010–2021	35	57	10	1534	92	32.63	–	–	–	–	–	–	150	7
415	Steven Smith	2010–	127	227	28	11003	239	55.29	1470	28	1008	19	3/18	53.05	224	–
416	Peter George	2010	1	2	0	2	2	1.00	168	3	77	2	2/48	38.50	0	–
417	Xavier Doherty	2010–2013	4	7	3	51	18*	12.75	918	36	548	7	3/131	78.29	2	–
418	Michael Beer	2011–2012	2	3	1	6	2*	3.00	406	13	178	3	2/56	59.33	1	–
419	Usman Khawaja	2011–2026	88	159	14	6229	232	42.95	18	0	8	0	–	–	68	–
420	Trent Copeland	2011	3	4	1	39	23*	13.00	648	34	227	6	2/24	37.83	2	–
421	Nathan Lyon	2011–	145	186	51	1766	47	13.08	35771	1127	17511	577	8/50	30.34	69	–
422	Shaun Marsh	2011–2019	38	68	2	2265	182	34.31	–	–	–	–	–	–	23	–
423	Pat Cummins	2011–	77	116	14	1681	64*	16.48	15259	550	7384	328	6/23	22.51	37	–
424	James Pattinson	2011–2020	21	25	9	417	47*	26.06	3963	142	2133	81	5/27	26.33	6	–
425	Mitchell Starc	2011–	110	162	33	2527	99	19.58	20899	648	11948	460	7/58	25.97	53	–
426	David Warner	2011–2024	112	205	8	8786	335*	44.59	342	1	269	4	2/45	67.25	91	–
427	Ed Cowan	2011–2013	18	32	0	1001	136	31.28	–	–	–	–	–	–	24	–
428	Matthew Wade	2012–2021	36	63	9	1613	117	29.87	30	1	28	0	–	–	74	11
429	Rob Quiney	2012	2	3	0	9	9	3.00	150	12	29	0	–	–	5	–
430	John Hastings	2012	1	2	0	52	32	26.00	234	3	153	1	1/51	153.00	1	–
431	Jackson Bird	2012–2017	9	9	6	43	19*	14.33	1934	80	1042	34	5/59	30.64	2	–
432	Moises Henriques	2013–2016	4	8	1	164	81*	23.42	330	12	164	2	1/48	82.00	1	–
433	Glenn Maxwell	2013–2017	7	14	1	339	104	26.07	462	4	341	8	4/127	42.62	5	–
434	Ashton Agar	2013–2023	5	7	1	195	98	32.50	1006	36	468	9	3/46	52.00	0	–
435	James Faulkner	2013	1	2	0	45	23	22.50	166	4	98	6	4/51	16.33	0	–
436	George Bailey	2013–2014	5	8	1	183	53	26.14	–	–	–	–	–	–	10	–
437	Alex Doolan	2014	4	8	0	191	89	23.88	–	–	–	–	–	–	4	–
438	Mitchell Marsh	2014–2024	46	80	7	2083	181	28.53	3483	92	2061	51	5/46	40.41	27	–
439	Steve O'Keefe	2014–2017	9	13	4	86	25	9.55	2228	68	1029	35	6/35	29.40	0	–
440	Josh Hazlewood	2014–	81	104	52	586	39	11.26	16214	677	7545	313	6/49	24.10	32	–
441	Joe Burns	2014–2020	23	40	1	1442	180	36.97	–	–	–	–	–	–	23	–
442	Adam Voges	2015–2016	20	31	7	1485	269*	61.87	76	1	44	0	–	–	15	–
443	Peter Nevill	2015–2016	17	23	2	468	66	22.28	–	–	–	–	–	–	61	2
444	Jon Holland	2016–2018	4	7	5	6	3	3.00	960	23	574	9	3/83	63.77	1	–
445	Callum Ferguson	2016	1	2	0	4	3	2.00	–	–	–	–	–	–	0	–
446	Joe Mennie	2016	1	2	0	10	10	5.00	168	5	85	1	1/85	85.00	–	–
447	Peter Handscomb	2016–2023	20	35	6	1079	110	37.20	–	–	–	–	–	–	30	–
448	Nic Maddinson	2016–	5	8	0	83	48	10.37	90	1	69	0	–	–	3	–
449	Matt Renshaw	2016–	18	31	2	1022	190	35.24	210	5	110	2	2/30	55.00	13	–
450	Hilton Cartwright	2017	2	2	0	55	37	27.50	54	1	31	0	–	–	0	–
451	Cameron Bancroft	2017–2019	10	18	1	446	82*	26.23	–	–	–	–	–	–	16	–
452	Chadd Sayers	2018	1	2	0	0	–	0.00	294	11	146	2	2/78	73.00	1	–
453	Aaron Finch	2018	5	10	0	278	62	27.80	–	–	–	–	–	–	7	–
454	Travis Head	2018–	70	120	6	4863	175	42.65	1079	14	671	16	4/10	41.93	38	–
455	Marnus Labuschagne	2018–	68	123	9	4861	215	42.64	1388	21	870	15	3/45	58.00	52	–
456	Marcus Harris	2018–2022	14	26	2	607	79	25.29	–	–	–	–	–	–	8	–
457	Kurtis Patterson	2019	2	2	1	144	114*	144.00	–	–	–	–	–	–	6	–
458	Jhye Richardson	2019–	4	5	1	25	9	6.25	591	30	273	13	5/42	21.00	0	–
459	Cameron Green	2020–	40	64	6	2012	174*	34.68	2621	70	1553	39	5/27	39.82	42	–
460	Will Pucovski	2021	1	2	0	72	62	36.00	–	–	–	–	–	–	0	–
461	Alex Carey	2021–	53	82	9	2544	156	34.84	–	–	–	–	–	–	201	20
462	Michael Neser	2021–	5	7	0	131	35	18.71	778	20	416	22	5/42	18.90	4	–
463	Scott Boland	2021–	20	26	9	167	40	9.82	3365	129	1605	87	6/7	18.44	9	–
464	Mitchell Swepson	2022	4	5	1	28	15*	7.00	892	14	458	10	3/55	45.80	2	–
465	Todd Murphy	2023–	7	10	1	122	41	13.55	1157	34	619	22	7/124	28.13	3	–
466	Matthew Kuhnemann	2023–	5	6	2	18	6	4.50	1026	30	555	25	5/16	22.20	2	–
467	Nathan McSweeney	2024	3	6	1	72	39	14.40	–	–	–	–	–	–	3	–
468	Sam Konstas	2024–	5	10	0	163	60	16.30	–	–	–	–	–	–	5	–
469	Beau Webster	2025–	12	20	3	533	72	31.35	729	23	388	12	3/64	32.33	16	–
470	Josh Inglis	2025–	6	9	0	290	102	32.22	–	–	–	–	–	–	2	–
471	Cooper Connolly	2025–	2	3	0	33	29	11.00	108	2	76	1	1/41	76.00	0	–
472	Brendan Doggett	2025–	2	2	1	20	13	20.00	290	4	215	7	3/51	30.71	1	–
473	Jake Weatherald	2025–	6	12	1	224	72	20.36	–	–	–	–	–	–	1	–

== Shirt number history ==
Since the 2019 Ashes series, there has been an introduction of names and numbers on all Test players' shirts as with ODI/T20 shirts in an effort to engage new fans and help identify the players. This forms part of the inaugural ICC World Test Championship, a league competition between the top nine Test nations spread over a two-year period, culminating in a Final between the top two teams.

S/N	Current	Past
1	–	Usman Khawaja (2019–2025)
2	Josh Philippe	
4	Alex Carey	
5	Matthew Short	
6	Sam Konstas	
7	Matthew Renshaw	Tim Paine (2019–2021)
8	Mitchell Marsh	
9	Cooper Connolly	
10	Liam Scott	Peter Siddle (2019), Will Pucovski (2021)
11	Oliver Peake	Joel Paris (2016)
12	Nathan Ellis	
13	–	Matthew Wade (2019–2021)
14	Marcus Harris	
15	Xavier Bartlett	Joe Burns (2019–2020)
16	Nathan McSweeney	
17	Marcus Stoinis	
18	Michael Neser	
19	Scott Boland	James Pattinson (2019–2020)
20	Aaron Hardie	
21	Beau Webster	
22	Mitchell Swepson	
23	Jake Fraser-McGurk	
26	Tanveer Sangha	
28	Lance Morris	
30	Pat Cummins	
31	–	David Warner (2019–2024)
33	Marnus Labuschagne	
34	Riley Meredith	
35	Brendan Doggett	
36	Todd Murphy	
38	Josh Hazlewood	
39	Jack Edwards	
40	Mahli Beardman	
42	Cameron Green	
43	Cameron Bancroft	
44	Nikhil Chaudhary	
45	Spencer Johnson	
46	Ashton Agar	
48	Josh Inglis	
49	Steve Smith	
50	Matthew Kuhnemann	
51	Joel Davies	
52	Billy Stanlake	
53	Nic Maddinson	
54	Peter Handscomb	
56	Mitchell Starc	
60	Jhye Richardson	
61	Mitchell Owen	
62	Travis Head	
66	Jake Weatherald	
67	Nathan Lyon	
70	Ashton Turner	
77	Sean Abbott	
82	Ben Dwarshuis	
85	Tim David	
88	Adam Zampa	
93	Chris Green	

== See also ==
- Test cricket
- Australia national cricket team
- List of Australia national cricket captains
- List of Australia ODI cricketers
- List of Australia Twenty20 International cricketers
