= New Zealand cricket team in England in 1973 =

International cricket tour

The New Zealand cricket team toured England in the 1973 season to play a three-match Test series against England. England won the series 2–0 with 1 match drawn.

== Test series summary ==
=== First Test ===
7–12 June 1973
(5-day match)
Scorecard

England	v	New Zealand
250 (107.4 overs); G Boycott 51 (145); DR Hadlee 4/42 (19 overs)		97 (41.4 overs); Extras 20; BR Taylor 19 (28); AW Greig 4/33 (10.4 overs)
325/8d (97 overs); AW Greig 139 (178); V Pollard 2/24 (9 overs)		440 (188.1 overs); BE Congdon 176 (377); GG Arnold 5/131 (53 overs)

England won by 38 runs
Trent Bridge, Nottingham
Umpires: DJ Constant and AEG Rhodes

- England won the toss and elected to bat.
- 10 June was taken as a rest day.

=== Second Test ===
21–26 June 1973
(5-day match)
Scorecard

England	v	New Zealand
253 (106 overs); AW Greig 63 (95); HJ Howarth 3/42 (25 overs)		551/9d (204.5 overs); BE Congdon 175 (454); CM Old 5/113 (41.5 overs)
463/9 (196 overs); KWR Fletcher 178 (380); HJ Howarth 4/144 (70 overs)

Match drawn
Lord's, London
Umpires: AE Fagg and TW Spencer

- New Zealand won the toss and elected to field.
- 24 June was taken as a rest day.

=== Third Test ===
5–10 July 1973
(5-day match)
Scorecard

New Zealand	v	England
276 (98.4 overs); MG Burgess 87 (171); CM Old 4/71 (20 overs)		419 (145.1 overs); G Boycott 115 (181); RO Collinge 5/74 (34 overs)
142 (70.3 overs); GM Turner 81 (207); GG Arnold 5/27 (22 overs)

England won by an innings and 1 run
Headingley, Leeds
Umpires: HD Bird and CS Elliott

- New Zealand won the toss and elected to bat.
- 8 July was taken as a rest day.

== Prudential Trophy ==
=== First ODI ===
18 July 1973
Scorecard

New Zealand; 158 (52.5 overs)	v	England; 159/3 (45.3 overs)
V Pollard 55 (112); JA Snow 4/32 (10 overs)		DL Amiss 100 (121); BE Congdon 1/32 (9 overs)

England won by 7 wickets
St. Helen's, Swansea
Umpires: DJ Constant (ENG) and CS Elliott (ENG)
Player of the match: DL Amiss (ENG)

- New Zealand won the toss and elected to bat.
- FC Hayes, GRJ Roope and DL Underwood (all ENG), and V Pollard, RE Redmond and BR Taylor (all NZ) made their ODI debuts.

=== Second ODI ===
20 July 1973
Scorecard

England; 167/8 (48.3 overs)	v	New Zealand
GRJ Roope 44 (103); BR Taylor 3/25 (10.3 overs)

No result
Old Trafford, Manchester
Umpires: HD Bird (ENG) and AEG Rhodes (ENG)

- New Zealand won the toss and elected to field.

== External sources ==
- CricketArchive – tour itineraries

== Annual reviews ==
- Playfair Cricket Annual 1974
- Wisden Cricketers' Almanack 1974
