= Peter McIntyre (cricketer) =

Australian cricketer (born 1966)

Personal information
- Full name: Peter Edward McIntyre
- Born: 27 April 1966 (age 60); Gisborne, Victoria, Australia
- Batting: Right-handed
- Bowling: Legbreak googly
- Role: Bowler

International information
- National side: Australia
- Test debut (cap 364): 26 January 1995 v England
- Last Test: 10 October 1996 v India

Domestic team information
- Years: Team
- 1988/89–1990/91: Victoria
- 1992/93–2001/02: South Australia

Career statistics
Competition	Test	First-class
Matches	2	97
Runs scored	22	798
Batting average	7.33	8.06
100s/50s	0/0	0/0
Top score	16	43
Balls bowled	393	25,372
Wickets	5	322
Bowling average	38.79	39.66
5 wickets in innings	0	12
10 wickets in match	0	2
Best bowling	3/103	6/43
Catches/stumpings	0/–	33/–
- Source: Cricinfo, 12 October 2022

Peter Edward McIntyre (born 27 April 1966) is a former Australian cricketer who played in two Test matches in the 1990s.

He was a leg-spin bowler, unlucky to have arrived at the same time as fellow spin bowlers Shane Warne and Stuart MacGill; consequently he never managed to establish himself in the national side. He played in two Tests, one against England in Adelaide in 1995 and another against India at New Delhi in 1996.

McIntyre dismissed Sachin Tendulkar in Tendulkar's first Test match as captain, caught for 10 by Mark Waugh with the second ball McIntyre bowled to him. He went on to take 3 for 103 but, according to Wisden, "bowled steadily but without variation or much imagination". This was his second Test – and he did not play another one, once Warne returned.

In the 1995–96 Sheffield Shield final, he and Shane George, South Australia's last two batsmen, held out the Western Australian bowlers for 40 minutes to ensure a draw and, as a result, victory for South Australia in the season's Shield competition.

He retired from first-class cricket in 2002, having debuted in 1988.
