= Laurie Mayne =

Australian cricketer

Personal information
- Full name: Lawrence Charles Mayne
- Born: 23 February 1942 (age 84); West Perth, Western Australia
- Batting: Left-handed
- Bowling: Right-arm fast-medium
- Role: Bowler

International information
- National side: Australia
- Test debut (cap 233): 3 March 1965 v West Indies
- Last Test: 5 March 1970 v South Africa

Domestic team information
- Years: Team
- 1961/62–1968/69: Western Australia

Career statistics
Competition	Test	First-class
Matches	6	58
Runs scored	76	667
Batting average	9.50	12.82
100s/50s	0/0	0/2
Top score	13	72
Balls bowled	1,251	12,545
Wickets	19	203
Bowling average	33.05	30.35
5 wickets in innings	0	6
10 wickets in match	0	0
Best bowling	4/43	7/75
Catches/stumpings	3/–	21/–
- Source: Cricinfo, 23 May 2020

Lawrence Charles Mayne (born 23 January 1942) is a former Australian cricketer who played in six Test matches between 1965 and 1970.

== Career ==
A strongly built right-arm fast bowler, Laurie Mayne played his first match for Western Australia in 1961–62, taking seven for 75 in the second innings against New South Wales in Perth. He established himself in the state team in 1964–65, taking 22 wickets, and was selected for the Australian team to tour the West Indies at the end of the season. He made his Test debut in the First Test at Kingston, taking four wickets in each innings, but was unsuccessful in the next two Tests and lost his place.

Mayne's next full season for Western Australia was 1968–69, when he took 41 wickets and was again selected for the national team's subsequent tour, this time to Ceylon, India and South Africa in 1969–70. He played in the Fifth Test in India and the Third and Fourth Tests in South Africa. In the last match of the South African tour he took five for 26 in Orange Free State's second innings, including a wicket with the last ball that took the Australians to victory in what was his final first-class match, at the age of 28.

A limited batsman, Mayne usually batted at number 10 or 11, but for the Australians against East Zone in Gauhati in 1969–70 he made 72 batting at number nine, adding 113 for the ninth wicket with John Gleeson in a match that the Australians won by 96 runs. The next-highest score in the match was only 37. It was Mayne's highest first-class score.

He played two seasons as a professional for Burnley in the Lancashire League in 1968 and 1969, taking 184 wickets.

Mayne later coached fast bowlers, advising them to visualise their run-ups in order to shorten them and avoid no-balls and injuries.
