= Peter Philpott =

Australian cricketer (1934–2021)

Personal information
- Full name: Peter Ian Philpott
- Born: 21 November 1934; Manly, New South Wales, Australia
- Died: 31 October 2021 (aged 86)
- Batting: Right-handed
- Bowling: Right-arm legbreak, googly
- Role: All rounder

International information
- National side: Australia
- Test debut (cap 234): 3 March 1965 v West Indies
- Last Test: 7 January 1966 v England

Domestic team information
- Years: Team
- 1954/55–1966/67: New South Wales

Career statistics
Competition	Test	First-class
Matches	8	76
Runs scored	93	2,886
Batting average	10.33	31.36
100s/50s	0/0	4/15
Top score	22	156
Balls bowled	2,262	15,717
Wickets	26	245
Bowling average	38.46	30.31
5 wickets in innings	1	12
10 wickets in match	0	2
Best bowling	5/90	7/53
Catches/stumpings	5/–	55/–
- Source: CricketArchive, 6 November 2021

Peter Ian Philpott OAM (21 November 1934 – 31 October 2021) was an Australian cricketer. He was a leg-spin bowler and middle order batsman who played for New South Wales and the national team in the 1960s. More recently, he was known as a coach.

He made his Test debut in the West Indies in 1964–65 and took 18 wickets (at 34.94) in the five Tests. Back home against England in the 1965–66 Ashes series he took 5/90 in the first innings of the First Test at Brisbane, forcing England to follow on, but took only 8 wickets (46.37) in the first three Tests of the series and was dropped.

He played for New South Wales from 1954–55 to 1966–67, and toured New Zealand with the Australian XI in 1966–67. His highest first-class score was 156 for New South Wales against Queensland in 1963–64. His best bowling figures were 7 for 53 against Western Australia in 1960–61. He captained New South Wales in several matches in 1963–64 and 1964–65.

He played as a professional in the Lancashire League for Ramsbottom in 1955, 1959 and 1960, and for East Lancashire in 1962.

He later became a prominent coach.

Philpott died on 31 October 2021 due to complications from a fall, 21 days short of his 87th birthday.
