= Bryan Davis (cricketer) =

West Indian cricketer (born 1940)

Personal information
- Full name: Bryan Allan Davis
- Born: 2 May 1940 (age 86); Belmont, Port of Spain, Trinidad and Tobago
- Batting: Right-handed
- Bowling: Right-arm offbreak
- Relatives: Charlie Davis (brother)

International information
- National side: West Indies
- Test debut: 26 March 1965 v Australia
- Last Test: 14 May 1965 v Australia

Domestic team information
- Years: Team
- 1959/60–1970/71: Trinidad and Tobago
- 1969–1970: Glamorgan

Career statistics
Competition	Test	FC	List A
Matches	4	112	34
Runs scored	245	6,231	920
Batting average	30.62	34.81	30.66
100s/50s	0/3	5/46	0/7
Top score	68	188*	74
Balls bowled	–	750	12
Wickets	–	9	0
Bowling average	–	48.22	–
5 wickets in innings	–	0	0
10 wickets in match	–	0	–
Best bowling	–	4/79	–
Catches/stumpings	1/–	127/–	10/–
- Source: Cricinfo, 3 July 2026

Bryan Allan Davis (born 2 May 1940) is a former West Indian international cricketer from Trinidad who played in four Test matches in 1965. He later qualified for Glamorgan, playing in the championship winning side in 1969.

== Career ==
Davis was born in Port of Spain, where he attended St Mary's College. He was an opening batsman and reliable slip fielder who played first-class cricket for Trinidad and Tobago from 1959–60 to 1970–71. He made his first first-class century in Trinidad's victory over Jamaica in 1963–64. He played his first Test the next season, scoring 54 and 58 against Australia on his home ground at Port of Spain, but was less successful in the next three Tests. He toured India and Ceylon in 1966–67 with the West Indies team, but did not play in the three Tests. He made his highest first-class score after the team returned to the West Indies, carrying his bat for 188 not out in a total of 338 for North Trinidad in the Beaumont Cup.

Davis joined Glamorgan for the 1969 season, when they won the County Championship. After struggling in the opening position at first, he moved down to the middle order. According to the Glamorgan captain at the time, Tony Lewis, he "developed into a superb cricketer in the middle order and a quite brilliant first slip". He scored 1,148 runs in 1969 at an average of 30.21, often making quick runs when they were needed. He scored 1,532 runs at 31.26 in 1970, helping Glamorgan to finish second in the County Championship. However, his family did not enjoy living in South Wales, and after the 1970 season he returned to Trinidad.
