= John Watkins (Australian cricketer) =

Australian cricketer

Personal information
- Full name: John Russell Watkins
- Born: 16 April 1943 (age 83); Newcastle, New South Wales
- Batting: Right-handed
- Bowling: Legbreak googly

International information
- National side: Australia
- Only Test (cap 264): 6 January 1973 v Pakistan

Career statistics
Competition	Test	First-class
Matches	1	10
Runs scored	39	70
Batting average	39.00	10.00
100s/50s	0/0	0/0
Top score	36	36
Balls bowled	48	1,167
Wickets	0	20
Bowling average	–	36.29
5 wickets in innings	–	0
10 wickets in match	–	0
Best bowling	–	4/72
Catches/stumpings	1/–	10/–
- Source: CricketArchive, 3 May 2022

John Russell Watkins (born 16 April 1943) is a former Australian cricketer who played in one Test match in 1973.

== Biography ==
=== Early years ===
Watkins was born in Newcastle, New South Wales, where he played most of his cricket. He started playing grade cricket for Waratah-Mayfield District Cricket Club in the late 1950s. For four seasons he travelled to Sydney and played for Western Suburbs District Cricket Club under former Test cricketer Alan Davidson.

In 1959–60 he played for Sydney Metropolitan Colts against Tasmania and took 5-16 for Newcastle against a touring Fijian side. That summer he played against Newcastle for the NSW Country Second XI.

Watkins played for NSW Colts in 1960–61. The same summer he played for Northern New South Wales, making 81 as an opener in a game against Southern NSW.

In 1961–62 Watkins took three wickets in an over in a colts game against Queensland. That summer he also took 6–66 against Southern NSW. In 1962–63 he scored 94 in a colts game against Queensland, taking part in a century plus stand with Doug Walters. In 1964–65 he took seven wickets in a colts game against Queensland. He continued playing for NSW Colts the following summer.

Eventually Watkins got sick of travelling and stopped playing grade cricket in Sydney. However he came to national prominence when he represented Northern New South Wales in a non-first-class match against the touring Indian side in 1967–68. He took ten wickets. The following summer he took 5–42 against the ACT for Newcastle. In the return match in 1969–70 he scored 66 not out and took 5-57 then 6-54 the following year. He represented Northern NSW against the touring English side in 1970–71 but had less success than against the Indians, taking three expensive wickets.

=== 1971–72 first-class debut ===
In 1971–72 Watkins took 4-99 for Northern NSW against the touring World XI, including the wicket of Graeme Pollock. He played for NSW against "The Thrashers" that summer and took 4-19 including the wickets of Richie Benaud and Neil Harvey.

A few weeks later he was selected to play for New South Wales against South Australia after John Gleeson withdrew through injury. In the first innings Watkins took 4 for 72 out of a total of 252 for 5 declared, his victims including Ian Chappell (stumped) and Greg Chappell.

=== 1972–73 season ===
John Gleeson was dropped from the NSW side at the beginning of the 1972–73 season and was replaced by Watkins. However, in four Sheffield Shield matches he took only six wickets. The six wickets were taken in the one game, against Victoria, where his scalps included Graham Yallop.

It was Watkins' 6 for 38 to bowl Northern New South Wales to victory against the touring Pakistan side that led the national selectors to choose him as the only spinner for the Third Test at the Sydney Cricket Ground a month later, after only five first-class matches in which he had taken 10 wickets at 39.00. (By contrast, in his four matches for Northern New South Wales against touring teams he had taken 24 wickets at 21.35.) Ashley Mallett had withdrawn from the side for business reasons and the selectors had elected to take three leg spinners on the tour to the West Indies: Watkins, Terry Jenner and Kerry O'Keeffe.

Watkins bowled poorly in his next game, for NSW against Victoria.

=== Test match ===
Prior to his Test debut Rohan Rivett wrote that:

There will be a lot of sympathy for Watkins when he takes the field tomorrow. His selection was not 24-hours-old when it was fiercely assailed by a former Australian Test captain who advocated eleventh hour reconsideration by the Test selectors. Happily, Messrs Harvey, Loxton and Ridings know their own minds and stuck to their decision so Watkins will have his big chance tomorrow against an array of experienced batsmen of the highest class, who have been playing good spin bowling since they left school. Those who watched Watkins' performance at the MCG for NSW against Victoria at Christmas do not agree with the pundits who have criticised his selection. Very simply, we have no Maileys, no Grimmetts, no O'Reillys. Our best spinner is Ashley Mallett, who cannot go to the Caribbean and is therefore omitted tomorrow. Watkins is, at least, as well worth a punt as anyone else and would be amazed if the selectors confine him to the 12th man role.

In the Test Watkins bowled inaccurately and took no wickets in his one brief spell. He later recalled:

That bad bowling on that Sunday, that's the only regret I have in cricket, and I'm sorry I can't have it over again, because knowing what I could do, in my opinion, that's what hurts most of all [that I didn't get a chance to atone]. Sometimes it haunts me, but anyway, that's part and parcel of life, and you cop it sweet. Anyone who asks me [to talk about it], that's no problem, it brings back bad memories, but you cop it sweet and anyone decent you respond by telling them what you think, and everyone's entitled to ask in that regard... The only person who gave me some moral support, after I'd bowled the six overs, was Keith Stackpole, he was vice-captain. He ran up and said, "It's not easy first-up, 'Wok'." I thought it was good of him to say that. Unfortunately I had one opportunity and I botched it; I lacked disposition on the day and after that I lost my confidence.

In the Australian second innings, with Australia eight wickets down and a lead of only 75, his ninth-wicket partnership of 83 with Bob Massie gave Australia enough leeway to achieve a narrow victory. Watkins made 36, having scored only 12 runs in his previous five first-class matches. He did not bowl in the second innings but took the catch that won Australia the match.

"As far as the batting goes and the catch, I'm pleased I got something out of the wreck", says Watkins. "We [him and Massie] just plugged along, hoped for the best and took it in our stride. I wasn't nervous; I was pretty casual [in fact]. I could always handle a bat; I thought, 'I'll either get runs or I won't'."

=== West Indies tour ===
The tour of the West Indies began poorly for Australia, with injuries to Bob Massie and Dennis Lillee resulting in a very real chance Watkins could play a Test. However he was made 12th man for 3 out of the first five games.

He took 2–28 against Leeward Islands then four wickets against Trinidad and Tobago. Watkins took four wickets against Guyana, including Clive Lloyd. but could not force his way into the Test team. He took no wickets against the Windward Islands in what turned out to be his last first-class game. His entire first-class career, of 10 matches, had taken only 14 months.

In the match against Trinidad and Tobago, Doug Walters mischievously suggested to Watkins that he might relax if he whistled "What Shall We Do With The Drunken Sailor?" as he ran in to bowl. Watkins did so – much to the amusement of Walters – but still bowled wide of the stumps.

Watkins reflected:

When you lose your confidence you don't want to bowl again. When I went on the West Indies tour I had no confidence, even though I got 17 wickets at an average of about 25, and 10 of them were in first-class games. I only bowled about 78 overs on tour. When you lose your confidence it's not a nice feeling – you can't do what you used to do, but I'm only sorry it was the wrong day at the wrong time [in Sydney], because if I was myself, I assure you, in my opinion, I would have played more Test cricket, but that's only my assumption. I appreciated the experience [in the Caribbean], but after three months with no confidence [in my bowling] I was pleased to get back home.

=== Later career ===
Watkins was dropped from the NSW side at the beginning of the 1973–74 season. He continued to play club cricket, mostly as a batsman, in Newcastle, where he worked for a shipping company.

In 1976–77 he took 4/66 for Newcastle against Sydney.
