= Gerry Gomez =

Trinidadian sportsman (1919–1996)

- Gomez in 1950

Personal information
- Full name: Gerry Ethridge Gomez
- Born: 10 October 1919; Port of Spain, Trinidad
- Died: 7 August 1996 (aged 76); Port of Spain, Trinidad
- Batting: Right-handed
- Bowling: Right-arm medium Right-arm off-break
- Role: All-rounder

International information
- National side: West Indies
- Test debut (cap 49): 22 July 1939 v England
- Last Test: 30 March 1954 v England

Umpiring information
- Tests umpired: 1 (1965)

Career statistics
Competition	Test	First-class
Matches	29	126
Runs scored	1,243	6,764
Batting average	30.31	43.63
100s/50s	1/8	14/29
Top score	101	216*
Balls bowled	5,236	15,178
Wickets	58	200
Bowling average	27.41	26.33
5 wickets in innings	1	5
10 wickets in match	1	2
Best bowling	7/55	9/24
Catches/stumpings	18/0	92/0
- Source: ESPNcricinfo, 30 May 2019

Gerry Ethridge Gomez (10 October 1919 – 6 August 1996) was a cricketer who played 29 Test matches for the West Indies cricket team between 1939 and 1954, scoring 1,243 runs and taking 58 wickets. He captained in one match for the West Indies when England toured in 1947/8.

Gomez was born in Port of Spain, Trinidad. During his career at the domestic level, he was an all-rounder of good standard, playing 126 matches and scoring runs at a batting average of nearly 45, in addition to taking 200 wickets at an average just above 25 with his medium pace.

He remained involved with cricket, as manager and administrator, and also served as an umpire in the Test match between West Indies and Australia in Georgetown, Guyana, in April 1965, when the appointed umpire, Cecil Kippins, pulled out on the day before the match. Kippins was ordered to withdraw by the British Guiana umpires' association, as Barbadian umpire Cortez Jordan was appointed as the second umpire, the first time a West Indian umpire had stood in a Test match outside his home territory. This was the first first-class match that Gomez umpired, and his only Test as an umpire.

Gomez also played football for Trinidad, and both his father and his son, Gregory Peter Gomez, played first-class cricket.

In June 1988 Gomez was celebrated on the $1.50 Trinidad and Tobago stamp alongside the Barbados Cricket Buckle.
