= Bruce Taylor (New Zealand cricketer) =

New Zealand cricketer (1943–2021)

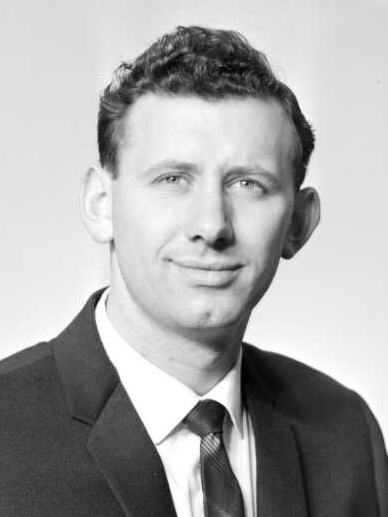
- Taylor in 1967

Personal information
- Full name: Bruce Richard Taylor
- Born: 12 July 1943; Timaru, New Zealand
- Died: 6 February 2021 (aged 77); Lower Hutt, New Zealand
- Batting: Left-handed
- Bowling: Right-arm fast-medium
- Role: All-rounder

International information
- National side: New Zealand (1965–1973)
- Test debut (cap 108): 5 March 1965 v India
- Last Test: 5 July 1973 v England
- ODI debut (cap 14): 18 July 1973 v England
- Last ODI: 20 July 1973 v England

Career statistics
Competition	Test	ODI	FC	LA
Matches	30	2	141	14
Runs scored	898	22	4,579	272
Batting average	20.40	22.00	24.75	24.72
100s/50s	2/2	0/0	4/17	0/1
Top score	124	22	173	59*
Balls bowled	6,334	114	21,562	410
Wickets	111	4	422	16
Bowling average	26.60	15.50	25.13	25.62
5 wickets in innings	4	0	15	0
10 wickets in match	0	0	0	0
Best bowling	7/74	3/25	7/74	4/38
Catches/stumpings	10/–	1/–	66/–	7/–
- Source: Cricinfo, 1 April 2017

Bruce Richard Taylor (12 July 1943 – 6 February 2021) was a New Zealand cricketer who played 30 Test matches and two One Day Internationals between 1965 and 1973. He was the first cricketer to score a century and take a five-wicket haul on debut in a Test match.

== International career ==
Taylor scored 105 and took 5–86 for New Zealand on Test debut against India at Calcutta in 1964–65, becoming the first man to have completed this all-round feat on debut. Taylor, who had never scored a first-class century before, and had played only three first-class matches, came in at No. 8 and slammed 105 in 158 minutes with 14 fours and three sixes and helped Bert Sutcliffe (151 not out) add 163 for the seventh wicket.

He also scored New Zealand's fastest Test century in 1969, a record that stood until Daniel Vettori broke it in 2005. In the First Test against the West Indies at Auckland, Taylor came in with the score at 152 for 6 and hit 14 fours and five sixes. His 50 came up in 30 minutes, and his century in 86 minutes. He finished on 124. This second Test century was, remarkably, also his second first-class century.

His outstanding series was in the West Indies in 1971–72. In a batsman's series, in which all five Tests were drawn, and no other bowler on either side took more than 14 wickets, Taylor took 27 wickets at 17.70 in four Tests. His best Test figures came in the Third Test in Bridgetown, when he took 7 for 74 to dismiss the West Indies for 133 before tea on the first day, bowling, Wisden said, "quite superbly". Of his overall performance in the series, Wisden said, "Tight control allied to a high action enabled him to extract any bounce going and there was no greater trier in the entire New Zealand party." He played his last Test on the tour to England in 1973.

== Domestic career ==
Taylor's highest first-class score came in 1972–73, when he hit 173 against Otago at Dunedin, after coming in to bat with the score on 42 for 4. He played his last first-class match in 1979–80.

== Later life ==
After retiring from cricket, Taylor served as a selector for the Wellington and Otago teams. He was also a selector for the New Zealand national cricket team when they played in the 1992 Cricket World Cup.

Taylor resigned his job as bursar at John McGlashan College in Dunedin in early 1993, following allegations of financial irregularities. In the grip of a gambling addiction, he had stolen more than $368,000 from the school. He pleaded guilty to 22 charges of fraud, and was sentenced to one year's imprisonment. He served this sentence from 1993 to 1994.

Taylor underwent a femoral bypass around 2016. Because his condition did not get better, one of his legs was amputated in March 2016 to stop gangrene from spreading. He died on 6 February 2021, at Hutt Hospital in Boulcott. He was 77.

A biography, "Tails" to Tell: The Bruce Taylor Story, written by Bill Francis with Taylor's co-operation, was completed just before he died and published in July 2021.

== See also ==
- List of New Zealand cricketers who have taken five-wicket hauls on Test debut
