= Grahame Thomas =

Australian cricketer (born 1938)

Personal information
- Born: 21 March 1938 (age 88); Croydon Park, New South Wales, Australia
- Batting: Right-handed

International information
- National side: Australia
- Test debut (cap 235): 3 March 1965 v West Indies
- Last Test: 11 February 1966 v England

Domestic team information
- Years: Team
- 1957–58 to 1965–66: New South Wales

Career statistics
Competition	Tests	First-class
Matches	8	100
Runs scored	325	5726
Batting average	29.54	40.32
100s/50s	0/3	17/23
Top score	61	229
Balls bowled	0
Wickets	–	0
Bowling average	–	–
5 wickets in innings	–	–
10 wickets in match	–	–
Best bowling	–	–
Catches/stumpings	3/0	92/2
- Source: Cricinfo

Grahame Thomas (born 21 March 1938 in Croydon Park, New South Wales) is a former Australian cricketer who played in eight Tests in 1965 and 1966.

After several seasons in which he established a reputation as a hard-hitting batsman for New South Wales in the Sheffield Shield, he made his Test debut a few days short of his 27th birthday against the West Indies in 1965. He played all five Tests in that series without notable success, and returned to the Test side in the 1965–66 Ashes series when Bobby Simpson was injured, making two fifties in the last three Tests of the series.

He toured South Africa in 1966–67 although there were rumours he may not be selected due to his mixed race heritage (he has Native American heritage). In the final event he went on the tour but was not selected for any of the Tests, and retired from first-class cricket at the end of the tour at the age of 28 in order to concentrate on his career in the printing industry. He was a reliable fielder who occasionally kept wicket in first-class matches.

He played most of his Grade cricket in Sydney with Bankstown-Canterbury and was honoured in 2005 with the renaming of Bankstown's Memorial Outer Oval to the "Grahame Thomas Oval". He was made a life member of Cricket NSW in 2011.

== See also ==
- List of New South Wales representative cricketers
