= Shane George =

Australian cricketer

Personal information
- Full name: Shane Peter George
- Born: 21 October 1970 (age 56); Adelaide, South Australia, Australia
- Batting: Right-handed
- Bowling: Right-arm fast-medium
- Role: Bowler

Domestic team information
- Years: Team
- 1987-88 to 1997-98: South Australia

Career statistics
Competition	FC	List A
Matches	56	27
Runs scored	509	54
Batting average	9.42	4.90
100s/50s	0/2	0/0
Top score	62	19
Balls bowled	10,784	1391
Wickets	156	36
Bowling average	40.57	31.86
5 wickets in innings	2	0
10 wickets in match	0	0
Best bowling	6/51	4/33
Catches/stumpings	16/–	3/–
- Source: Cricinfo, 13 October 2019

Shane Peter George (born 20 October 1970) is a former cricketer who played first-class and List A cricket for South Australia from 1987-88 to 1997-98.

Shane George was an opening bowler. In his best season, 1994–95, he was one of the leading bowlers in Australia, taking 43 wickets at an average of 33.55, helping South Australia to second position in the Sheffield Shield. His best figures came in his first season, 1987–88, when he took 6 for 51 and 3 for 71 in South Australia’s innings victory over Tasmania. In the 1995-96 Sheffield Shield final, he and Peter McIntyre, South Australia's last two batsmen, held out the Western Australian bowlers for 40 minutes to ensure a draw and, as a result, victory for South Australia in the season's Shield competition.

In 1988 he was one of the 15 inaugural inductees at the Australian Institute of Sport's Cricket Academy.
