= Compton Vyfhuis =

West Indian cricket umpire

Personal information
- Full name: Compton F. Vyfhuis
- Born: 30 May 1932; Georgetown, British Guiana
- Died: 23 January 2009 (aged 76); Georgetown, Guyana

Umpiring information
- Tests umpired: 6 (1974–1978)
- ODIs umpired: 2 (1977–1981)
- Source: Cricinfo, 17 July 2013

Compton Vyfhuis (30 May 1932 – 23 January 2009) was a West Indian cricket umpire.

Vyfhuis stood in six Test matches between 1974 and 1978 and two ODI games in 1977 and 1981. The ODI in 1977 between West Indies and Pakistan was the first ODI to be played in the West Indies.

In all, Vyfhuis umpired 39 first-class matches between 1971 and 1989, most of them in Guyana.

== See also ==
- List of Test cricket umpires
- List of One Day International cricket umpires
