= History of Australian cricket from 1960–61 to 1970 =

This article describes the history of Australian cricket from the 1960–61 season until 1970.

Notable Australian players early in this period included Neil Harvey, Alan Davidson and Richie Benaud, but all three retired after the 1962–3 series against England. By then, Bobby Simpson, Bill Lawry, Wally Grout and Garth McKenzie had come to the fore.

== Domestic cricket ==
New South Wales continued its post-war predominance until the middle of the decade.

=== Sheffield Shield winners ===
- 1960-61 – New South Wales
- 1961-62 – New South Wales
- 1962-63 – Victoria
- 1963-64 – South Australia
- 1964-65 – New South Wales
- 1965-66 – New South Wales
- 1966-67 – Victoria
- 1967-68 – Western Australia
- 1968-69 – South Australia
- 1969-70 – Victoria

=== Vehicle & General Australasian Knock-out Competition winner ===
The first domestic one-day competition to be held outside the UK was contested between the six Australian state teams and New Zealand in 1969-70.

- 1969-70 – New Zealand

== International tours of Australia ==
=== West Indies 1960-61 ===
For more information about this tour, see : West Indian cricket team in Australia in 1960-61

=== New Zealand 1961-62 ===
The New Zealand national cricket team toured Australia in the 1961–62 season and played 3 first-class matches against Western Australia, South Australia and New South Wales. New Zealand drew with Western Australia, lost to South Australia by 6 wickets and lost to New South Wales by 59 runs.

See : CricketArchive tour itinerary

=== England 1962-63 ===
For more information about this tour, see : English cricket team in Australia in 1962-63

=== South Africa 1963-64 ===
For more information about this tour, see : South African cricket team in Australia in 1963-64

=== Pakistan 1964-65 ===
For more information about this tour, see : Pakistani cricket team in Australia in 1964-65

=== England 1965-66 ===
For more information about this tour, see : English cricket team in Australia in 1965-66

=== India 1967-68 ===
For more information about this tour, see : Indian cricket team in Australia in 1967-68

=== New Zealand 1967-68 ===
For more information about this tour, see : New Zealand cricket team in Australia in 1967–68

=== West Indies 1968-69 ===
For more information about this tour, see : West Indian cricket team in Australia in 1968-69

=== New Zealand 1969-70 ===
The New Zealand national cricket team toured Australia in the 1969–70 season and played 3 first-class matches against Tasmania, Victoria, and New South Wales. All three games were drawn. New Zealand joined the Australian state teams in the V&G Knockout Cup, a limited overs competition that New Zealand went on to win, defeating Victoria by 6 wickets in the final.

See : CricketArchive tour itinerary

== External sources ==
- CricketArchive – itinerary of Australian cricket
