= Peter Allan (Australian cricketer) =

Australian cricketer (1935–2023)

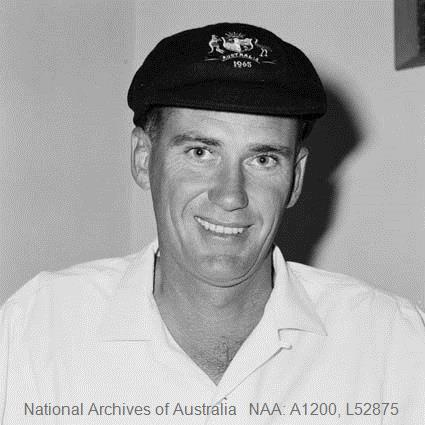
- Allan in 1965

Personal information
- Born: 31 December 1935; Brisbane, Queensland, Australia
- Died: 22 June 2023 (aged 87)
- Batting: Right-handed
- Bowling: Right-arm fast-medium

International information
- National side: Australia
- Only Test (cap 236): 10 December 1965 v England

Domestic team information
- Years: Team
- 1959/60–1968/69: Queensland

Career statistics
Competition	Test	First-class
Matches	1	57
Runs scored	–	689
Batting average	–	10.59
100s/50s	–/–	0/0
Top score	–	41
Balls bowled	192	11,498
Wickets	2	206
Bowling average	41.50	26.10
5 wickets in innings	0	12
10 wickets in match	0	3
Best bowling	2/58	10/61
Catches/stumpings	0/–	23/–
- Source: ESPNcricinfo, 16 December 2021

Peter John Allan (31 December 1935 – 22 June 2023) was an Australian cricketer who played in one Test in 1965.

== Early life ==
Allan was born 31 December 1935. He attended Brisbane State High School.

== Career ==
A tall right-arm fast-medium bowler, Allan made his first-class debut for Queensland in the 1959-60 season, but after that he spent some time working in Victoria, and did not establish himself in cricket until he returned to Queensland in 1963. After consistent good form in the Sheffield Shield, he toured the West Indies with the Australian side in 1964-65 but fell ill early in the tour and did not play in the Tests.

Allan opened the bowling in the First Test at Brisbane in the 1965–66 Ashes series, taking two wickets in the drawn match. He was dropped in favour of Alan Connolly for the Second Test, but was recalled for the Fourth Test after taking 10 for 61 in the first innings for Queensland against Victoria in January 1966, the third-best figures recorded in Australia. However, he was injured just before the Test, and replaced by Graham McKenzie, who took 6 for 48 as Australia won by an innings.

Allan continued opening the bowling for Queensland until he retired after a successful 1968–69 season in which he headed the national averages with 46 wickets at 16.36. He served on the executive committee of the Queensland Cricket Association from 1985 to 1991. He later managed Queen Elizabeth II Stadium in Brisbane.

On 14 July 2000, Allan was awarded the Australian Sports Medal for his cricketing achievements.

Allan died on 22 June 2023, at the age of 87.
