= Cleophas Paynter =

Vincentian cricket umpire (1943–1983)

Personal information
- Born: 1943; Saint Vincent, British Windward Islands
- Died: 27 April 1983 (aged 39–40); Kingstown, Saint Vincent

Umpiring information
- Tests umpired: 1 (1977)
- ODIs umpired: 1 (1977)
- Source: ESPNcricinfo, 14 July 2013

Cleophas Paynter (1943 – 27 April 1983) was a Vincentian cricket umpire. Paynter stood in two international matches, a Test and an ODI match in 1977. He umpired 11 first-class matches between 1968 and 1977.
