= David Cowper (cricketer) =

Australian cricketer (born 1939)

Personal information
- Full name: David Raymond Cowper
- Born: 25 January 1939 (age 87); Melbourne, Victoria, Australia
- Batting: Right-handed
- Role: Wicket-keeper
- Relatives: Bob Cowper (brother); Dave Cowper (father)

Domestic team information
- Years: Team
- 1965/66: Victoria
- Source: Cricinfo, 4 December 2015

David Raymond Cowper (born 25 January 1939) is an Australian former cricketer. He played two first-class cricket matches for Victoria during the 1965–66 season as a wicket-keeper.

Cowper made his state debut against the touring Marylebone Cricket Club side of 1965–66, called up after an injury to Ray Jordon. Batting at number nine, he made 60 not out in Victoria's first innings and shared in an unbeaten 122 run partnership with Graeme Watson for the eighth wicket. Cowper featured in Victoria's next match against Western Australia, he scored 3 and 22 not out in his only experience of Sheffield Shield cricket. His younger brother, Bob, played alongside him in both his first-class matches.

Cowper had a lengthy grade cricket career with Richmond Cricket Club, making a club record 297 appearances between 1958 and 1980.

In 1993, Cowper emigrated to the West Midlands in England, the birthplace of his wife. He was a cricket coach for Warwickshire Cricket Board and managed the county's under-17s team in the late 1990s and 2000s, which included overseeing the development of future England international Ian Bell.
