= Charlie Griffith =

West Indian cricketer (born 1938)

Sir Charlie Griffith KA SCM
Personal information
- Full name: Charles Christopher Griffith
- Born: 14 December 1938 (age 87); Saint Lucy, Barbados
- Batting: Right-handed
- Bowling: Right-arm fast

International information
- National side: West Indies
- Test debut: 25 March 1960 v England
- Last Test: 13 March 1969 v New Zealand

Career statistics
Competition	Test	First-class
Matches	28	96
Runs scored	530	1,502
Batting average	16.56	17.26
100s/50s	0/1	0/4
Top score	54	98
Balls bowled	5,631	15,509
Wickets	94	332
Bowling average	28.54	21.60
5 wickets in innings	5	17
10 wickets in match	0	1
Best bowling	6/36	8/23
Catches/stumpings	16/–	39/–
- Source: CricInfo, 26 June 2019

Sir Charles Christopher Griffith (born 14 December 1938) is a Barbadian former cricketer who played 28 Tests for the West Indies from 1960 to 1969. He formed a formidable fast bowling partnership with Wes Hall during the 1960s, but experienced a number of controversies during his career, notably being called for throwing twice, and fracturing the skull of Indian cricket captain Nari Contractor with a bouncer.

Griffith started playing club cricket in Barbados at a young age, as a right-arm spinner. During one game he decided to bowl right arm fast and finished with figures of 7 for 1. He remained a fast bowler and soon after was chosen to represent Barbados. His first-class debut was made against the Marylebone Cricket Club who were touring the Caribbean in 1959–60 and in the space of two overs he dismissed England internationals Colin Cowdrey, Mike Smith and Peter May.

In the match between Barbados and the touring Indians in 1961–62, captain Nari Contractor was hit on the back of the head by a Griffith bouncer, fracturing his skull, and leading to the premature end of his career. Later in the match Griffith was no-balled by umpire Cortez Jordan for throwing, the first of two times that he was called during his career. The other occasion was a tour match against Lancashire in 1966, when Griffith was called by Arthur Fagg.

Griffith had a successful tour of England in 1963, finishing the summer with 119 wickets at 12.3, 32 of them coming in the Test series. In the first innings of the Headingley Test he took 6 for 36 and finished the match with 9 wickets. He was a Wisden Cricketer of the Year in 1964.

Griffith was made a Knight of St Andrew by the Barbadian government in 2017, having previously been given the Silver Crown of Merit in 1992.
