= Cortez Jordan =

Personal information
- Full name: Hugh B de Cortez Jordan
- Born: 1921; Barbados
- Died: 8 September 1982 (aged 60–61); Barbados
- Role: Umpire

Umpiring information
- Tests umpired: 22 (1953–1974)
- Source: Cricinfo, 18 June 2013

Hugh Cortez Jordan (1921 – 8 September 1982) was a Test cricket umpire from the West Indies between 1953 and 1974. In total, he oversaw 22 Test matches, all in the Caribbean and involving the West Indies team.

His first Test, at the Kensington Oval in Bridgetown, on his home island of Barbados, saw the West Indies defeat India by 142 runs on 7–12 February 1953.

Jordan umpired the first-class match between Barbados and the touring Indian team in March 1962, in which Charlie Griffith bowled a bouncer that struck Indian captain Nari Contractor on the back of his head at the start of the Indians' first innings. After being helped off the field, Contractor underwent emergency surgery to remove two blood clots on his brain. He was unconscious for six days, and the injury ending his international cricket career. Later in the same match, Jordan was the first of two umpires to call Griffith for throwing in a first-class match (the other being Arthur Fagg in a match against Lancashire in 1966) Vijay Manjrekar was also forced to retire hurt in the first innings after being hit on the nose by Griffith, and the tourists were skittled out for 86. Despite an unbeaten century by Manjrekar in the second innings, following on, Barbados won by an innings and 95 runs, with Contractor, Polly Umrigar and E.A.S. Prasanna all absent.

Jordan became the first West Indian umpire to stand in a Test match outside his home territory when he officiated in the match between West Indies and Australia in Georgetown, Guyana in April 1965. After the British Guiana umpires association ordered local umpire Cecil Kippins to withdraw at short notice, West Indies chairman of selectors and former Test cricketer Gerry Gomez took Kippins' place - the first time that Gomez had umpired a first-class match, and his only Test as an umpire.

Jordan and Douglas Sang-Hue were the umpires in the drawn Test against the touring England in February 1968 at Kingston, Jamaica. West Indies were bowled out for 143 in their first innings, 233 runs behind England, and were asked to follow on. Crowd trouble started on the fourth day when Basil Butcher was fifth out in the second innings with West Indies still 28 runs behind. The police used tear gas to subdue the crowd. Unfortunately strong winds blew the gas back towards the police, into the commentator's stand and then into the main pavilion, where the Governor-General, Clifford Campbell, and other dignitaries were watching the match. The match was extended by 70 minutes into a sixth day to make up for lost time. A century by Gary Sobers set England a target of 159 to win, but the match ended with England on 68-8, still 90 runs behind.

His final match, after 21 years as a Test umpire, was then drawn match against England at Sabina Park in Kingston, Jamaica between 16 and 21 February 1974. He died in 1982, in Barbados.
