= Ralph Gosein =

Personal information
- Full name: Ralph Godfrey Gosein
- Born: 1931; Trinidad
- Died: 27 August 1999 (aged 67–68); St Clair, Port-of-Spain, Trinidad
- Role: Umpire

Umpiring information
- Tests umpired: 25 (1965–1978)
- ODIs umpired: 2 (1978)
- Source: Cricinfo, 18 June 2013

Ralph Godfrey Gosein (1931 – 27 August 1999) was a West Indian cricket umpire. He umpired in 25 Test matches between 1965 and 1978.

Gosein was born in Trinidad and educated at Fatima College. He began umpiring in 1954, having been encouraged to do so by his colleague at the Chamber of Industry and Commerce, Eric Lee Kow. His first Test match as an umpire came in 1965, at the Queen's Park Oval in Port-of-Spain, featuring the West Indies against Bobby Simpson's touring Australians.

With Douglas Sang Hue, he umpired the fourth Test between the West Indies and India at Sabina Park, Jamaica in April 1976, in which Indian captain Bishen Bedi declared his team's first innings early in protest against sustained short pitched bowling from the West Indian pacemen. When India were five down in their second innings, they had no further fit batsmen to take the crease, and West Indies won by 10 wickets inside four days.

He was umpiring when rioting caused the final 38 balls of play between the West Indies and India to be lost in the fifth Test at Sabina Park, Jamaica in 1978. West Indies were 110 behind with one wicket left in their second innings. Gosein turned down a request from the teams for the lost overs to be played on an extra day, a decision later upheld by the MCC.

He also umpired two ODIs in 1978, stood in the five World Series Cricket "Supertests" and five of the 12 WSC ODIs in the Caribbean in 1978/9. He acted as the third umpire in several other Tests and ODIs, the last in June 1997.

After retiring, he headed the Trinidad and Tobago Umpires Council and was awarded the Humming Bird Gold Medal by the Government of Trinidad and Tobago in recognition of his service to the sport. He died in St Clair, Port-of-Spain.

== See also ==
- List of Test cricket umpires
- List of One Day International cricket umpires
