= Douglas Sang Hue =

Personal information
- Full name: Douglas Sang Hue
- Born: 28 October 1931; Clarendon, Jamaica
- Died: 22 August 2014 (aged 82); Jamaica
- Role: Umpire

Umpiring information
- Tests umpired: 31 (1962–1981)
- ODIs umpired: 1 (1988)
- Source: Cricinfo, 10 April 2009

Douglas Sang Hue (28 October 1931 - 22 August 2014) was a West Indian cricket umpire. He was of Chinese descent.

Sang Hue umpired 31 Test matches in the West Indies between 1962 and 1981, mostly in the 1970s. His first Test as umpire, the fifth Test against India at Sabina Park, Kingston, Jamaica, in March 1962, was also the first time he had officiated in a first-class match. He stood in four further Test matches in the 1960s. Wisden called him "Quite the most professional of the umpires" standing in the series against the touring English team in 1967/68.

Sang Hue and Cortez Jordan were the umpires in the drawn Test against the touring England team in February 1968 at Kingston, Jamaica, the second Test of the series. West Indies were bowled out for 143 in their first innings, 233 runs behind England, and were asked to follow on. Crowd trouble started on the fourth day when Basil Butcher was correctly given out by Sang Hue, the fifth wicket to fall in the second innings with West Indies still 28 runs behind. The police used tear gas to subdue the crowd. Unfortunately strong winds blew the gas back towards the police, into the commentators' stand and then into the main pavilion, where the Governor-General, Clifford Campbell, and other dignitaries were watching the match. The match was extended by 70 minutes into a sixth day to make up for the lost time. A century by Gary Sobers set England a target of 159 to win, but the match ended with England on 68–8, still 90 runs behind.

Sang Hue was the first umpire to stand in all five Tests of a series in the West Indies, against Australia in 1972/3. He repeated the feat in the five Tests against England in 1973/4. In 1973, Ian Chappell called him the "best umpire in the world".

At the February 1974 Test against England at Port of Spain, Trinidad, West Indian batter Bernard Julien defended the last ball of the second day. His partner Alvin Kallicharran walked off the pitch towards the pavilion assuming the day's play was over. Tony Greig, fielding at silly point, picked the ball up and threw down the stumps. Sang Hue had not called "time", so adjudged Kallicharran run out. Following the decision police had to be called in to control the volatile spectators. After a 2½ hour meeting between the captains, the umpires, and West Indies Cricket Board representatives, the official decision was to reinstate Kallicharran, with Greig's appeal "withdrawn". Greig and Kallicharran shook hands in the middle of the pitch before play resumed on the third day.

Sang Hue spent a summer in England in 1977, umpiring matches in the County Championship, John Player League and Benson & Hedges Cup. He was the only non-Australian umpire in Kerry Packer's World Series Cricket later in 1977. After standing in one more Test in the West Indies, the first Test against Australia at Queen's Park Oval in March 1978, he was then dropped by the West Indies Cricket Board. He stood in four of the six WSC "Supertests" in Australia in 1977–78, and two of the five in 1978–9, including the Final, together with the five "Supertests" and three out of 12 ODIs in the WSC tour of the Caribbean in 1979.

He returned to stand in three Tests of the 1980/81 series against England. He umpired only one ODI match, the first ODI between West Indies and Pakistan at Sabina Park in March 1988.

Ray Robinson, the Australian Cricket writer, said of him that he had the shortest white coat and the longest dismissal finger on that side of the Atlantic.

== See also ==
- List of Test cricket umpires
- List of One Day International cricket umpires
