= Cecil Kippins =

West Indian cricket umpire (1925–2023)

Personal information
- Full name: Frank Cecil Percival Kippins
- Born: 23 January 1925; Georgetown, British Guiana
- Died: 7 March 2023 (aged 98); Atlanta, Georgia, U.S.

Umpiring information
- Tests umpired: 10 (1958–1973)
- Source: Cricinfo, 9 July 2013

Frank Cecil Percival Kippins (23 January 1925 – 7 March 2023) was a West Indian cricket umpire from Guyana. He stood in ten Test matches between 1958 and 1973. In all, he umpired 43 first-class matches between 1953 and 1974, most of them at the Bourda ground in Georgetown, Guyana.

Kippins retired from umpiring in 1974 and migrated to the United States. He died in Atlanta, Georgia on 7 March 2023, at the age of 98.

== See also ==
- List of Test cricket umpires
