= Australian cricket team in England in 1977 =

International cricket tour

The Australian cricket team toured England in the 1977 season to play five Test matches for the 1977 Ashes series against England. The Australians also played three one day internationals and 19 other tour matches.

The Australian side had been quite strong in the early 1970s and had won the previous two Ashes series, 1974–75 at home and 1975 in England. Although it was not a contest for The Ashes, Australia and England had also played in the Centenary Test from 15 to 19 March 1977 to mark the 100th anniversary of the first Test match. Remarkably Australia won by the same margin as in 1877, 45 runs. However the tourists, led by new captain Greg Chappell, were rocked prior to the start of the 1977 Ashes series by the conflict between the Australian Cricket Board and Kerry Packer's Nine Network that emerged following the Centenary Test regarding the rights to television broadcasts of cricket in Australia. Packer wanted to transfer the rights to televised cricket from the Australian Broadcasting Corporation (ABC) who had held the rights since 1956, to his own Nine Network and was prepared to pay a much larger amount than ABC. Despite this, the Australian Cricket Board refused, and Packer set about creating a rebel World Series Cricket (WSC) league, successfully recruiting many star international players in the process.

Eventually all but two of the squad would take part in WSC, the exceptions being Kim Hughes and Craig Serjeant. England were also affected, but not as badly. The English captain Tony Greig was stood down from the captaincy as punishment, but retained his place in the side. Mike Brearley replaced Greig as England captain. Despite reasonable returns the inexperienced Australians were outplayed, and England won the series 3–0 with two matches drawn. England therefore regained The Ashes for the first time since 1972.

== Australian touring party ==
The Australian touring squad was selected by Neil Harvey, Phil Ridings and Sam Loxton. It consisted of:

- Batsmen – Greg Chappell (captain), Ian Davis, Rick McCosker, Doug Walters, David Hookes, Kim Hughes, Craig Serjeant, Gary Cosier
- Fast bowlers – Jeff Thomson, Len Pascoe, Max Walker, Geoff Dymock, Mick Malone
- Spin bowlers – Kerry O'Keeffe, Ray Bright
- Wicketkeepers – Rod Marsh (vice-captain), Richie Robinson
- Tour officials – Len Maddocks (tour manager), Norm McMahon (assistant manager), David Sherwood (scorer), Syd McRae (physio), Tony Smith (transport)

Dennis Lillee was unavailable for selection due to injury. Former Test regulars Alan Turner and Gary Gilmour were controversially overlooked due to poor form in the 1976–77 summer.

== Test series summary ==
=== First Test ===
16–21 June 1977 (5–day match)
1st Test Scorecard

England	v	Australia
216 (86.5 overs); RA Woolmer 79 (202); JR Thomson 4/41 (20.5 overs)		296 (114.1 overs); CS Serjeant 81 (175); RGD Willis 7/78 (30.1 overs)
305 (112.4 overs); RA Woolmer 120 (248); JR Thomson 4/86 (24.4 overs)		114/6 (39 overs); DW Hookes 50 (104); DL Underwood 2/16 (10 overs)

Match drawn
Lord's, London
Umpires: HD Bird and WL Budd
Player of the match: RA Woolmer (ENG)

- England won the toss and elected to bat.
- 19 June was taken as a rest day.
- LS Pascoe, RD Robinson and CS Serjeant (all AUS) made their Test debuts.

=== Second Test ===
7–12 July 1977 (5–day match)
Scorecard

Australia	v	England
297 (109.2 overs); KD Walters 88 (157); JK Lever 3/60 (25 overs)		437 (169.1 overs); RA Woolmer 137 (338); RJ Bright 3/69 (35.1 overs)
218 (81.5 overs); GS Chappell 112 (230); DL Underwood 6/66 (32.5 overs)		82/1 (29.1 overs); JM Brearley 44 (83); KJ O'Keeffe 1/25 (9.1 overs)

England won by 9 wickets
Old Trafford, Manchester
Umpires: WE Alley and TW Spencer

- Australia won the toss and elected to bat.
- 10 July was taken as a rest day.
- RJ Bright (AUS) made his Test debut.

=== Third Test ===
28 July–2 August 1977 (5–day match)
Scorecard

Australia	v	England
243 (82.2 overs); RB McCosker 51 (126); IT Botham 5/74 (20 overs)		364 (124.2 overs); APE Knott 135 (210); LS Pascoe 4/80 (32 overs)
309 (127 overs); RB McCosker 107 (307); RGD Willis 5/88 (26 overs)		189/3 (81.2 overs); JM Brearley 81 (211); MHN Walker 3/40 (24 overs)

England won by 7 wickets
Trent Bridge, Nottingham
Umpires: HD Bird and DJ Constant

- Australia won the toss and elected to bat.
- 31 July was taken as a rest day.
- IT Botham (ENG) made his Test debut.

=== Fourth Test ===
11–15 August 1977 (5–day match)
Scorecard

England	v	Australia
436 (155.4 overs); G Boycott 191 (471); LS Pascoe 4/91 (34.4 overs)		103 (31.3 overs); RB McCosker 27 (39); IT Botham 5/21 (11 overs)
		248 (89.5 overs); RW Marsh 63 (87); M Hendrick 4/54 (22.5 overs)

England won by an innings and 85 runs
Headingley, Leeds
Umpires: WE Alley and WL Budd

- England won the toss and elected to bat.
- 14 August was taken as a rest day.
- The match was scheduled for five days but completed in four.
- G Boycott scored his 100th first-class hundred. He was also the fourth English player to be on the field for the entire duration of the Test Match.

=== Fifth Test ===
25–30 August 1977 (5–day match)
Scorecard

England	v	Australia
214 (101.2 overs); JM Brearley 39 (146); G Boycott 39 (128); MF Malone 5/63 (47 overs)		385 (131.3 overs); DW Hookes 85 (113); RGD Willis 5/102 (29.3 overs)
57/2 (26 overs); G Boycott 25* (78); MF Malone 1/14 (10 overs)

Match drawn
The Oval, London
Umpires: DJ Constant and TW Spencer

- Australia won the toss and elected to field.
- 28 August was taken as a rest day.
- There was no play on the first day.
- KJ Hughes and MF Malone (both AUS) made their Test debuts.

== One Day Internationals (ODIs) ==
England won the Prudential Trophy 2–1.

=== 1st ODI ===
2 June 1977
Scorecard

Australia; 169/9 (55 overs)	v	England; 173/8 (45.2 overs)
CS Serjeant 46 (109); DL Underwood 3/29 (11 overs)		GD Barlow 42 (66); MHN Walker 3/20 (7 overs)

England won by 2 wickets
Old Trafford, Manchester
Umpires: DJ Constant and BJ Meyer
Player of the match: RW Marsh (AUS)

- Australia won the toss and elected to bat.
- DW Hookes, MF Malone, KJ O'Keeffe, LS Pascoe and CS Serjeant (all AUS) and JM Brearley and P Willey (both ENG) made their ODI debuts.

=== 2nd ODI ===
4 June 1977
Scorecard

England; 171 (53.5 overs)	v	Australia; 70 (25.2 overs)
DL Amiss 35 (52); CM Old 35 (59); GJ Cosier 5/18 (8.5 overs)		GS Chappell 19 (21); JK Lever 4/29 (11 overs)

England won by 101 runs
Edgbaston, Birmingham
Umpires: WE Alley and WL Budd
Player of the match: JK Lever (ENG)

- Australia won the toss and elected to field.
- KJ Hughes and RD Robinson (both AUS) made their ODI debuts.

=== 3rd ODI ===
6 June 1977
Scorecard

England; 242 (54.2 overs)	v	Australia; 246/8 (53.2 overs)
DL Amiss 108 (146); LS Pascoe 3/44 (11 overs)		GS Chappell 125* (137); RGD Willis 2/49 (11 overs)

Australia won by 2 wickets
The Oval, London
Umpires: HD Bird and KE Palmer
Player of the match: GS Chappell (AUS)

- Australia won the toss and elected to field.
- G Miller (ENG) made his ODI debut.

== Other tour matches ==
- Duchess of Norfolk's XI v Australians at Arundel Castle Cricket Ground, Arundel, 27 Apr 1977

Australians (186/5) beat the Duchess of Norfolk's XI (166 all out) by 20 runs

Australia began their 1977 tour of England with the traditional warm-up game against the Duchess of Norfolk's XI at Arundel Castle Cricket Ground. The match was a 45-over limited overs cricket match, and Australian captain Greg Chappell won the toss and elected to bat. Although not scoring at a particularly fast rate, a solid second wicket partnership of 101 between Chappell (44) and Craig Serjeant (65) was the backbone of a well made 186 for 5. Indian-born Bob Woolmer, who would later play a part in the Test series, was the best of the bowlers with 3 for 17 off seven overs.

The Duchess of Norfolk's XI lost their first wicket in the second over, that of opener John Barclay caught and bowled by Mick Malone for 7. However a 40-run partnership between Bob Woolmer and Peter Willey, and a 44-run partnership between Derek Randall (41), and Willey who made 50, steadied the ship. But the Australian bowlers lacked the penetration of the usual opening bowling partnership of Dennis Lillee and Jeff Thomson, who had caused so much discomfort on the previous tour. Despite this, once the partnership of Willey and Randell was broken, wickets began to fall at regular intervals, the only other notable contributions being 14 from Tony Greig and 15 from Phil Edmonds. Gary Cosier was the pick of the Australian bowlers with 4 for 18 off 6.3 overs. The Duchess of Norfolk's XI were all out for 166 off 41.3 overs, with Australia winning by 20 runs.

- Surrey County Cricket Club v Australians at Kennington Oval, London, 30 Apr-3 May 1977

Match Drawn

Surrey captain John Edrich won the toss and decided to bat first. Openers Edrich, and Alan Butcher got off to a solid start, taking them to 48 for the first wicket. Their partnership was broken when Butcher was caught behind by Rod Marsh off the bowling of Len Pascoe for 23. Lonsdale Skinner contributed 17, but then Edrich was joined by Pakistan Test batsman Younis Ahmed, and the pair added 66 for the third wicket. Their stand was broken by the medium bowling of Max Walker who had Ahmed caught by Kim Hughes for 40, and dismissed Edrich caught behind for 70 soon after. Walker then dismissed David Smith for a duck, and at 165 for 5 the tourists were in a commanding position. New batsman Graham Roope had other ideas though, and was in commanding form. He formed lower order partnerships with Intikhab Alam (16), Robin Jackman (16), and Geoff Arnold (11) who all supported him ably as he made his way to 107 not out, guiding Surrey to a respectable 327 for 8. Not for the first time in the match, play was abandoned early on the second day due to rain, and no play occurred on the third day, with the match ending in a draw.

- Kent County Cricket Club v Australians at St Lawrence Ground, Canterbury, 4–6 May 1977

Match Drawn

After the disappointing rain-affected match at the Oval, the Australians headed to the St Lawrence Ground in Canterbury to take on Kent in a 3-day game. The Australians won the toss and batted first. The tourists' innings could not have got off to a worse start, with opener Ian Davis clean bowled by Kevin Jarvis for a first ball duck. The innings recovered though, with Craig Serjeant and Kim Hughes adding 79 for the second wicket, but once Serjeant had been removed for 55, Gary Cosier followed him next over without adding to the score, leaving Australia on 79 for 3. The tourists ended day one on 119 for 3. Solid but unimpressive middle order efforts followed from Doug Walters (23), Richie Robinson (18), and Rod Marsh (23) dragged Australia past 200, but with the weather again threatening to disrupt play, and wanting some bowling practice, the Australians declared on 240 for 7, Ray Bright not out on 11, and Max Walker not out on 16. Jeff Thomson made his first appearance for the tourists, opening the bowling from the Pavilion End. However it was first change bowler Ray Bright who got the breakthrough, having Graham Johnson caught behind by Marsh for 17. Charles Rowe went for a duck next over off the bowling of Mick Malone, but rain soon interrupted play, and the rest of day two was washed out. The rain had set in, and no additional play was managed on day three, with the second game in a row ending in a draw.

- Sussex County Cricket Club v Australians at County Ground, Hove, 7–10 May 1977

Match Drawn

The Australian tourists moved on to Hove the next day after the draw against Kent, but the poor weather continued there. Australian captain Greg Chappell won the toss, and decided his side needed more batting practice with the one-day series and Tests approaching. Very little play was possible on the first day as a result of the heavy rain, with the Australians managing to reach just 35 for 1 at the end of the day.

Day two proved to be little better, and although opener Craig Serjeant managed to pass fifty, on his way to 55 not out, the game was called off after 34 overs, with the third day abandoned.

- Hampshire County Cricket Club v Australians at County Ground, Southampton, 11–13 May 1977

Match Abandoned

The Australian schedule would have seen them play three games in row, without any rest days in between. However the weather conspired to prevent this occurrence, and the Australians travelled from Hove to Southampton to discover the foul weather was even worse there. The tourists arrived at the ground, but after a pitch inspection was made by the umpires, the game was abandoned without a ball bowled. No coin toss was made either.

- Glamorgan County Cricket Club v Australians at St Helens Rugby and Cricket Ground, Swansea, 14–16 May 1977

Match Drawn

Following the abandonment of the two previous games, the Australian touring party were keen to get some match practice, with the two international series rapidly approaching. They travelled from Southampton onto Swansea, in Wales to take on Glamorgan in another three-day game. The first day was again washed out, but the rain had cleared by the morning of the second. With the weather finally favouring play after a long week of rain, Glamorgan captain Alan Jones won the toss, and confidently decided to bat first. The captain opened alongside John Hopkins, and the pair began aggressively, but Max Walker had Hopkins clean bowled in the fifth over. From there, Jones batted with a steady procession of partners, holding up the innings by himself as wickets continued to fall at the other end at regular intervals. Only the captain's namesake Alan Lewis Jones made a serious contribution with 46. Jones (captain and opener) was top-scorer with 59. Shortly before lunch Glamorgan were all out for 172 off 54.3 overs. Walker and Geoff Dymock sharing the spoils with three wickets apiece.

The Australians still looked rusty, having spent most of the tour so far hiding from the rain in the dressing room. They too failed to settle and build partnerships, with regular wickets falling. By the end of day two, the Australian tourists found themselves 153 for 6 after 36 overs, with only Gary Cosier making a serious contribution of 56.

Day three began with the weather again threatening, and Chappell declared the Australian innings closed without returning to the crease to try to make a game of it. However Glamorgan openers Jones and Hopkins made much better work of it the second time around, pushing the score past 100 without loss. With Australia's frontline bowlers struggling to make a breakthrough, spinner Ray Bright was brought on, and made an immediate impact, having the advancing Hopkins stumped brilliantly by replacement wicket-keeper Richie Robinson for 66. Bright troubled the Glamorgan batsmen with his left-arm orthodox spinners, and soon claimed another, Arthur Francis for 2, leaving Glamorgan on 119–2. Gwyn Richards arrived as his replacement and tried to lift the scoring, but Bright soon claimed Jones for 47, and Mike Llewellyn for 9. Glamorgan had reached 164 for 4 off 43 overs and decided to end their innings and give the Australian's a competitive target. Bright finished with 4 for 53.

The Australians began their chase of the target of 183 disastrously. Veteran bowler Malcolm Nash had opener Richie Robinson lbw for a second ball duck, and had Kim Hughes caught behind two balls later for a golden duck. Australia ended the first over on 2 for 0. Ian Davis and David Hookes tried to rebuild their innings, but both had also soon departed. Doug Walters also went cheaply, and it was left to spinners Ray Bright and Kerry O'Keeffe to offer the only resistance, putting on a partnership of over 40. The only highlight in an otherwise disastrous innings was Bright bringing up his 1000th first-class run. Australia survived a torrid attack from Nash to reach stumps on 86 for 6 off 29 overs, Nash claiming 5 for 32.

- Somerset County Cricket Club v Australians at Recreation Ground, Bath, 18–20 May 1977

Somerset (340/5d & 182/3) beat the Australians (232 all out & 289 all out) by 7 wickets

The Australians moved on to Bath to take on Somerset, and the weather finally began to look favourable. Australia won the toss and decided to bat on a decent batting wicket. Rick McCosker went cheaply and was soon followed by Craig Serjeant, but captain Greg Chappell looked to be in commanding touch. He set about building a strong partnership with Gary Cosier, which saw the tourists pass 150 for 2. Soon after though, Cosier misread a straight one on off-stump from West Indian paceman Joel Garner, and was clean-bowled for 44. Doug Walters made a useful but disappointing 23, but David Hookes and Rod Marsh both failed with 3 apiece. Kerry O'Keeffe added a useful 11 to help see Australia past 200, but a collapsing tail saw Australia all out for 232 off 67.3 overs, with Chappell top-scorer with 113. The Australian captain hit three 6s in his innings, including one into the nearby River Avon. Garner finished with 4 for 66, but local medium-pacer Graham Burgess was the pick of the bowlers with 5 for 25.

In contrast to the Australians poor start, the Somerset openers eased past 50, before Peter Denning was caught behind off Geoff Dymock for 39. Viv Richards surprisingly could only manage 18, and Somerset captain Brian Close was removed for a duck. Somerset finishing day one on 130 for 3. Day two began well for the Australians, with O'Keffee removing Dennis Breakwell for 23, however strong innings by Ian Botham (59) and Phil Slocombe (55) supported opener Brian Rose to 110 not out. Somerset declared their innings closed at 340 for 5 off 94 overs, a lead of 108.

- Gloucestershire County Cricket Club v Australians at Phoenix Ground, Bristol, 21–23 May 1977

Australia (154 all out & 251 all out) beat Gloucestershire (63 all out & 169 all out) by 173 runs

Australia moved on to Bristol looking for their first win since the opening match of the tour against the Duchess of Norfolk's XI. With only three tour matches to go before the start of the One day international series, the tourists were hoping to build some momentum going into those matches. Greg Chappell won the toss, and elected to bat first, but the Australia innings was poor. McCosker fell for 2 with the score on 3. Kim Hughes fell a few overs last for 7. The wickets continued to tumble at regular intervals, with the only real resistance coming from Doug Walters (32), and Ray Bright (53). The Australians were all out for 154 in 47.5 overs.

Thankfully for the tourists, Gloucestershire were even poorer. After an opening stand of 36 from Sadiq Mohammad and Andy Stovold, Max Walker and Mick Malone made short work of their batting line-up. It took the Australian opening pair just 22.5 overs to have Gloucestershire all out for a paltry 63. Walker took an impressive 7/19 off 11.5, and Malone, 3/43 off 11 overs.

Australia again started with a wobble, losing McCosker for 4 in the third over, but a 42 run partnership between Chappell and Ian Davis got them back on track. Davis eventually went for 18, but that brought Kim Hughes to the crease. Although scoring less prolifically, Hughes capably supported Chappell as he moved towards a well-deserved century, falling on 102. It was enough to prop up the Australian second innings, and solid contributions from Hughes (27), Doug Walters (24), Richie Robinson (26), and Max Walker (22) took Australia to 251 all out. Gloucestershire required an unlikely 343 for victory, and never looked like they would reach the target. Andy Stovold made 27, and Jim Foat and David Shepherd both chipped in with 26 each, but Gloucentershire were all out for 169. Len Pascoe (4/36) and Ray Bright (4/63) were the pick of the Australian bowlers, as they wrapped up a deserved victory by 173 runs in two days.

- Gloucestershire County Cricket Club v Australians at Phoenix Ground, Bristol, 24 May 1977

Australia (196/4) beat Gloucestershire (195 all out) by 6 wickets Owing to the completion of their tour match in two days instead of the scheduled three, an additional 45-overs a side match was agreed to be played. No toss was made, but Gloucestershire batted first by a Gentlemen's agreement. The County side again struggled with the tourist's bowling, Pascoe clean-bowling Mohammed for 4, and dismissing Zaheer Abbas for 5. Stovold made a solid 25, and Mike Procter made a well-deserved 52. Pascoe, Malone, Walker, O'Keefe and Bright all took two wickets each in what was a good workout for Australia's bowling attack, and their County hosts only managed to scramble to 195 all out off 44.5 overs.

The total never looked like enough, and with the first one-day international only eight days away, the Australians took the opportunity to play themselves into a bit of form. Davis and McCosker again made solid starts, scoring 26 and 46 respectively, but it was Kim Hughes (51), and Doug Walters (52 not out) that took the game away from Gloucestershire. Hughes fell as the target approached, but Rod Marsh came in with only four runs required for victory, and over eight overs still spare. Only Robinson out for 10, really disappointed, as Australia won comfortably by 6 wickets.

- Marylebone Cricket Club v Australians at Lord's Cricket Ground, London, 25–27 May 1977
- Worcestershire County Cricket Club v Australians at Worcester, 28–30 May 1977
- Essex County Cricket Club v Australians at Chelmsford, 11–13 Jun 1977
- Nottinghamshire County Cricket Club v Australians at Nottingham, 25–27 Jun 1977
- Derbyshire County Cricket Club v Australians at Chesterfield, 29 Jun-1 Jul 1977
- Yorkshire County Cricket Club v Australians at Scarborough, 2–4 Jul 1977
- Northamptonshire County Cricket Club v Australians at Northampton, 16–19 Jul 1977
- Warwickshire County Cricket Club v Australians at Birmingham, 20–22 Jul 1977
- Leicestershire County Cricket Club v Australians at Leicester, 23–25 Jul 1977
- Lancashire County Cricket Club v Australians at Manchester, 6–8 Aug 1977
- Middlesex County Cricket Club v Australians at Lord's, 20–22 Aug 1977

== Annual reviews ==
- Playfair Cricket Annual 1978
- Wisden Cricketers' Almanack 1978
