= Ian Davis (cricketer) =

Australian cricketer

Personal information
- Full name: Ian Charles Davis
- Born: 25 June 1953 (age 73); North Sydney, New South Wales, Australia
- Batting: Right-handed

International information
- National side: Australia
- Test debut (cap 266): 29 December 1973 v New Zealand
- Last Test: 15 August 1977 v England
- ODI debut (cap 20): 30 March 1974 v New Zealand
- Last ODI: 4 June 1977 v England

Domestic team information
- Years: Team
- 1973/74–1974/75: New South Wales
- 1975/76: Queensland
- 1976/77–1982/83: New South Wales

Career statistics
Competition	Test	ODI	FC	LA
Matches	15	3	88	22
Runs scored	692	12	4,609	462
Batting average	26.61	6.00	33.39	23.10
100s/50s	1/4	0/0	7/28	0/4
Top score	105	11*	156	84
Catches/stumpings	9/–	0/–	48/–	8/–
- Source: Cricinfo, 12 December 2005

Ian Charles Davis (born 25 June 1953) is an Australian former cricketer (batsman) who played in 15 Test matches and three One Day Internationals between 1973 and 1977. Davis retired from first-class cricket in 1984, then worked for Dunlop Slazenger (part of the Pacific Brands group) until his retirement in 2010.

== Bright start ==
Ian Davis' talent was spotted early and he was selected to tour the West Indies in 1969/70 with the Australian Schoolboys XI. To ensure he could make the trip his local community in Shoalhaven clubbed together to sponsor his journey, something Davis remains grateful for to this day. On tour Davis was chosen to open the batting with another future test player Gary Cosier for the first two matches against Jamaica Under-19s. He scored 11, 8 and 8. In the third tour match against Barbados he scored one run not out batting at four. In his sixth match of the tour Davis scored a magnificent century against Trinidad and Tobago Under-19s and backed up with 50 not out in the second innings. He finished the tour averaging a very good 43.71 from the seven matches he played. Davis was in good company on the tour, along with Cosier, Trevor Chappell and Gary Gilmour went on the represent Australia, while Andrew Sincock had a long first-class career with South Australia.

Davis made his Sheffield Shield debut for New South Wales in November 1973 against Western Australia at The WACA. Batting at 6 he scored 27 and 25. In his next match Davis scored a first innings 86 against South Australia. Davis' good form was enough to earn him a call-up to the Australian XI to face New Zealand in December 1973 (just a month after debut and aged just 20). A weak New Zealand side were routed by an innings and 25 runs. Davis, batting at 6, scoring 15 runs before being caught behind by Ken Wadsworth off the bowling of Dayle Hadlee.

His maiden first-class century came on 18 January 1974 against Victoria. He scored 109 not out against a Victorian bowling line-up including future Australia international Ray Bright and former international Alan Thomson. Davis ended the season top of the NSW batting averages with 52.90 in 12 innings in 7 Sheffield Shield matches, the 109 not out being his only century, with 5 fifties. He was sixth overall in the Shield batting averages, with Greg Chappell top averaging a remarkable 92.09 in 13 innings.

Davis was selected for the test series in New Zealand playing in all three tests. He scored his first test fifty in Christchurch in March 1974 scoring exactly 50 runs from 107 balls before being caught by New Zealand captain Bev Congdon off the bowling of Richard Hadlee. It was during this tour that Davis made his ODI debut scoring 11 not out in Dunedin.

Davis performed well enough to be included in the Australian squad for the 1974/75 Ashes series at home to England. Although he did not appear in any of the Test matches Davis did face Mike Denness' tourists playing for NSW scoring 4 and 38 batting at 3, being dismissed by Chris Old in both innings. NSW lost the match by 187 runs.

The 1974/75 season was a poor one for Davis. He failed to register a first-class century, scoring only one fifty. He played 15 innings in 8 matches averaging only 17.21. His place in the test XI had been taken by the returning Ross Edwards. Australia regained the Ashes in a series famous for the fierce fast bowling of Lillee and Thomson. For the 1975/76 season Davis moved to Queensland. Under the captaincy of Greg Chappell, Davis was chosen to open the batting. Although not as spectacular as his debut season he averaged 34.08 from 12 innings in 8 matches, with a top score of 61. That season Queensland won the Gillette Cup beating Western Australia in the final, Davis scored 44 from 57 balls, in a thrilling 4 run win. The 1976/77 season saw a return to form for Davis, he returned to NSW, after just one season away, and topped their batting averages (53.83) after scoring two hundreds in the first four matches of the Sheffield Shield.

== Recalled ==
Subsequently, Davis was recalled by Australia for the 1976/77 test series at home to Pakistan. Selected to open the batting in the first test at Brisbane he scored his maiden test century (105 off 201 balls) in the first innings but was out for a duck in the second bowled by Sarfraz Nawaz. Davis finished the three match series with an average of 49.00 after scoring fifties in both innings in the second test at the Melbourne Cricket Ground (56 and 88).

A two test tour to New Zealand followed the Pakistan series. Davis finished the tour with an average of 33.72 and top score of 68 from 12 innings in 6 matches. He scored only 75 runs in the tests with a top score of just 34. The thrilling Centenary Test match against England at the MCG was played in March 1977, Davis scoring a vital 68 in the Aussies' second innings. Australia won the match by 45 runs, Dennis Lillee claiming 11 wickets in the match.

The Australian winter of 1977 saw Davis selected in the Ashes party to tour England. Davis played two ODIs on the tour scoring one run in two innings, he never played another ODI. In the five test series Davis was picked in the second, third and fourth tests opening with Rick McCosker. However he scored only 107 (ave. 17.83), his best score of 34 coming in his first test innings at Old Trafford. Following scores of 12, 33, 9, 0 and 19 Davis was dropped and replaced by Craig Serjeant at the top of the order. The fourth test at Headingley would not only be Davis' last test but also the last officially recognised first class match he would play until the 1979/80 season.

== World Series Cricket ==
Davis was signed by Kerry Packer for World Series Cricket in 1977. As one of the brightest talents in Australia his signature was considered vital for the marketing and success of the brand. In the first year of WSC (1977/78) Davis played 3 Supertests scoring a best of 84 against the World XI. He would play 2 more Supertests in the 1978/79 season scoring just 48 runs (ave. 12). Davis found breaking into the WSC Australian XI just as tough as the official side his path being blocked by McCosker and Bruce Laird. The fact that Davis averaged roughly half as many runs in Supertests as he did in official tests highlights the high level of competition in WSC. It was during the second Supertest that Australian batsman David Hookes suffered a broken jaw from an Andy Roberts bouncer. Packer was said to encourage his bowlers to be aggressive. Traditional cricket followers became shocked by the posturing and bad-language broadcast via pitch microphones. The highly charged atmosphere and Packer's preference for fast bowling led to many of the WSC stars, including Davis, to wear protective helmets. A piece of cricket equipment Davis would later help develop after retirement.

Davis had more success in the International Cup (the 40 over competition), which is surprising given he was only selected for three official One-Day Internationals. He played in 18 International Cup matches over the two seasons scoring 428 runs (ave. 25.18) with two fifties (top score 69). Davis was selected for the marquee WSC Tour of the West Indies, however the bank he was employed with refused to grant him leave. So Davis missed out on the tour which signalled the end of World Series Cricket after Packer reached a settlement with the cricketing authorities in May 1979.

== After World Series Cricket ==
The 1979/80 season saw the Packer players return to their State sides. Although Davis would play only three Sheffield Shield matches that season batting back down the order at 4. The highlight of his being a score of 112 against the new fully participating Tasmania side at Launceston. He failed to pass 50 in any of his other innings. The 1980/81 season was another relatively poor one for Davis. He played 7 matches scoring just 251 runs, with a top score of 91 not out. He finished the season with an average of 27.88. However NSW, under the captaincy of Rick McCosker, finished runners-up in the table only 3 points behind Western Australia. NSW would finish even closer runners-up in 1981/82 just two points behind David Hookes' South Australia. Davis had his best season since 1976/77 averaging 38 with two hundreds, he had moved back to open the batting. His best innings (133) coming against Tasmania at Hobart. Another century followed in the next match, an 8 wicket win against Queensland (113).

1982/83 proved to be Davis' final first-class season. NSW were again runners-up to Western Australia, this time by four points. But Davis played just twice scoring 87 runs. Davis retired aged just 30. His last first-class match being played on 10 February 1983 against the touring Sri Lankans. He scored 14 runs.

Davis' biography was published in 2004 entitled, More Than Cricket, as told to Author Brian Wood.
