= Craig Serjeant =

Australian cricketer

Personal information
- Full name: Craig Stanton Serjeant
- Born: 1 November 1951 (age 75); Nedlands, Western Australia
- Batting: Right-handed
- Role: Batsman

International information
- National side: Australia (1977–1978)
- Test debut (cap 279): 16 June 1977 v England
- Last Test: 28 April 1978 v West Indies
- ODI debut (cap 36): 2 June 1977 v England
- Last ODI: 12 April 1978 v West Indies

Domestic team information
- Years: Team
- 1976/77–1982/83: Western Australia

Career statistics
Competition	Test	ODI	FC	LA
Matches	12	3	80	22
Runs scored	522	73	4,030	610
Batting average	23.72	24.33	35.04	32.10
100s/50s	1/2	0/0	9/20	0/2
Top score	124	46	159	65
Balls bowled	–	–	6	–
Wickets	–	–	0	–
Bowling average	–	–	–	–
5 wickets in innings	–	–	–	–
10 wickets in match	–	–	–	–
Best bowling	–	–	–	–
Catches/stumpings	13/–	1/–	90/–	13/–
- Source: , 12 December 2005

Craig Stanton Serjeant (born 1 November 1951) is a former Australian cricketer who played in 12 Test matches and three One Day Internationals in 1977 and 1978.

== Career ==
=== First Class Debut ===
Serjeant made his first class debut in 1976–77 for Western Australia, scoring 27 against South Australia. Serjeant enjoyed a successful season, scoring 730 runs at an average of 66.36, including 89 against New South Wales, 82 against the visiting Pakistan, 54 against Victoria, 140 against Queensland and 101 against the touring MCC. In the Gilette Cup final he scored 38, taking part in a 51 run partnership, helping Western Australia win the game by one wocket.

In February 1977 Peter McFarline wrote in The Age that Serjeant's score of 140 might see him picked on the Ashes tour if Alan Turner and Kim Hughes lost form. Ian Chappell wrote Serjeant "is fast coming to the attention of selectors... Normally a first year player wouldn't be considered for an important tour like the UK but in a reason of remarkable batting collapses and very few consistent scores, Serjeant has been impressive." In March Bill O'Reilly called Serjeant "an outstanding contender for the tour."

Serjeant's run of strong scores, particularly against two touring sides, saw him selected in the Australian squad for the 1977 Ashes. He was one of a number of young batsmen in the squad, others including Kim Hughes and David Hookes. Australia only took two specialist openers, Rick McCosker and Ian Davis, and it was thought Serjeant could be a back up.

=== 1977 Ashes ===
Australia's batting line up in the Centenary Test immediately prior to the tour had been Rick McCosker, Ian Davis, Gary Cosier, Greg Chappell, David Hookes and Doug Walters. Poor early tour form from Cosier and Davis saw opportunities open up in the Test team for others. Serjeant was one of the better performing batsmen, with scores of 65 at Arundel, 55 against Kent and Surrey, 50 against Somerset and 59 against Essex. Many of these runs were scored with Sergeant opening. Serjeant expressed a desire to bat down the order but Greg Chappell said "he has no say in the matter".

Australia's Test preparations were thrown by the news of the World Series Cricket plans. Serjeant was one of only four players in the Australian squad who had not signed (the others being Kim Hughes, Gary Cosier and Geoff Dymock).

Serjeant was picked to play for Australia in two of the One-Day Internationals.

He was also selected to play in the first Test at Lord's, batting at four (Davis and Cosier were dropped, Richie Robinson was picked to open.) Serjeant top scored in Australia's first innings with 81 but failed in the second in a match that ended in a draw.

Serjeant's good form continued with 159 against Nottinghamshire, in one of Australia's few victories on the tour. He also made 55 against Yorkshire. He revealed he had been offered a place in World Series Cricket but declined. Serjeant also received an offer to play in Queensland but turned it down.

Serjeant failed twice in the second Test then endured a run of poor form in the tour games. He was overlooked for the third and fourth Tests.

Serjeant was recalled to the team for the fifth Test, where he replaced Ian Davis as opener. He scored a duck, in a rain shortened draw.

=== 1977–78 vs India ===
Serjeant enjoyed good domestic form at the beginning of the 1977–78 summer, scoring 129 against New South Wales, 140 against Queensland and 63 against South Australia.

Serjeant was not only selected in Australia's team for the first Test, but also appointed vice captain under Bob Simpson. He scored a pair in the first Test failed twice against India for WA, then failed twice again in the second Test.

Serjeant managed to keep his position for the next two Tests. In the third he made 85, which he later described as his best innings. However he failed in the second innings, and in both digs in the 4th Test.

He was dropped for the final Test of the series, but was kept on for the tour to the West Indies.

=== 1977–78 West Indies Tour ===
In the West Indies Serjeant scored 63 in his first tour game but a duck in the second. This meant he was initially not picked in the first Test team but a last minute illness to Rick Darling saw him open – he scored 3 and 40, helping put on an opening partnership of 59 with fellow Western Australian Graeme Wood.

Serjeant then made 114 against Barbados but failed twice in the second test.

Serjeant kept his place in the third Test. He made a duck in the first innings but scored 124 in the second, helping lead Australia to a famous victory.

In the fourth Test Serjeant made 49 and 4 then 26 and 32 not out in the fifth.

=== Later career ===
Serjeant struggled early during the 1978–79 season and was unable to regain his place in the Australian team. However, he performed solidly for Western Australia for the next few seasons. He was appointed vice captain at the beginning of the 1981–82 season.

== Post-cricket career ==
Serjeant graduated from the Western Australian Institute of Technology (WAIT) with a degree in science in 1972 and worked as a chemist at SCGH for 12 years. He then became a financial planner, working under former Australian bowler Sam Gannon from 1988 onwards.
