= Gary Cosier =

Australian cricketer

Personal information
- Full name: Gary John Cosier
- Born: 25 April 1953 (age 73); Richmond, Victoria, Australia
- Batting: Right-handed
- Bowling: Right-arm medium

International information
- National side: Australia
- Test debut (cap 274): 26 December 1975 v West Indies
- Last Test: 15 December 1978 v England
- ODI debut (cap 31): 20 December 1975 v West Indies
- Last ODI: 16 June 1979 v Canada

Domestic team information
- Years: Team
- 1971/72: Victoria
- 1974/75–1976/77: South Australia
- 1977/78–1979/80: Queensland
- 1980/81: Victoria

Career statistics
Competition	Test	ODI	FC	LA
Matches	18	9	91	22
Runs scored	897	154	5,005	432
Batting average	28.93	30.80	32.92	27.00
100s/50s	2/3	0/1	7/27	0/2
Top score	168	84	168	84
Balls bowled	899	409	5,987	786
Wickets	5	14	75	19
Bowling average	68.20	17.71	30.68	25.52
5 wickets in innings	0	1	0	1
10 wickets in match	0	0	0	0
Best bowling	2/26	5/18	3/20	5/18
Catches/stumpings	14/–	4/–	75/–	8/–
- Source: Cricinfo, 11 August 2011

Gary John Cosier (born 25 April 1953) is a former Australian international cricketer who played in 18 Test matches and nine One Day Internationals between 1975 and 1979. Cosier's star shone very briefly following a sensational debut, when he became only the ninth Australian to post a century in his first Test.

== Overview ==
The stocky, redheaded Cosier was a middle-order batsman who often attacked the bowling when a more judicious method was the order of the day. Given an extended trial at international level over four seasons, he never really established himself as a Test batsman, although he was vice-captain of Australia for a brief period. He had two major highlights at Test level – a hundred on his Test debut at Melbourne against the West Indies in 1975–76, and a 168 against Pakistan the following season. Test bowlers were quick to exploit his technical deficiencies, in particular a very short backlift and abbreviated footwork. Cosier was all brute force with little finesse, but he did try to modify his technique somewhat during the 1978–79 Ashes series, when he was incongruously used as an opener.

He could back his batting with slow medium-pacers that swung alarmingly when the conditions favoured him. On the 1977 tour of England he showed in an ODI at Edgbaston that he could have been well suited to the burgeoning genre of one-day cricket when he snared five for 18. However, Cosier's bowling was not really used in Tests and his first Test wicket did not come until his 13th match. He was also an excellent close-in fielder and secure slipper.

== Early career ==
Born and raised in Melbourne, Cosier attended University High School, where he captained the First XI and represented the Australian junior team in the West Indies. Highlights of that trip included 96 against Barbados.

Cosier played club cricket for Northcote where his captain was Bill Lawry. He made his first-class debut aged 18 for Victoria during the summer of 1971–72, opening with Lawry. Early sports writers sometimes compared him to Lawry. Cosier was a different style of batsman but later said "Bill's influence on me was in the way he could fight out of a situation. He was incredible the way he would bat with pain and with everything running against him."

During that summer he also appeared for the Victorian Colts side along with such players as Rodney Hogg and Paul Hibbert.

Cosier struggled with his weight throughout his career, in part due to his back trouble – a permanent condition since birth: a vertebra is out of alignment. "I can't do any heavy physical work at all", he said in February 1977. "I can't run or do gym work."

=== Move to South Australia ===
He relocated to South Australia to play regular first class cricket. "I wasn't getting many runs, and one day keeper Ray Jordon told me to get across to Adelaide", he later recalled. "I thought no more of it until Ray, now a newspaper columnist, wrote a story saying I would definitely be going to South Australia". This resulted in a series of offers from Adelaide clubs which prompted Cosier to move in 1974.

Coming under the influence of South Australian skipper Ian Chappell, Cosier pursued his positive approach to batting and seemed to be headed for the top, although Chappell doubted his commitment to the game.

Highlights of the 1974–75 summer for Cosier included 81 against Victoria.

== International Cricketer ==
=== 1975–76 Season ===
Cosier had an excellent season with the bat in 1975–76.

He leapt into test consideration with 130 for South Australia against the touring West Indians. He followed this up with 76 against NSW, and a match winning 49 against Queensland. He was named in a 13-person Australian squad to play a one-day international against the West Indies.

Cosier pressed his claims with 71 and 49 against Victoria although he injured his hamstring in the second innings at had to bat with a runner.

Cosier made his international debut for Australia against the West Indies in a one-day game. He took 1-33 and scored 25 not out, helping guide Australia to a five wicket victory. He was duly selected in the test team for the third test, replacing Terry Jenner. Cosier celebrated this by promptly scoring another century for South Australia against the West Indians, 107.

=== Test Debut ===
Cosier scored a century on debut. He later recalled:

I remember going out to bat at 5pm and Andy Roberts had just taken the second new ball. I had a really close lbw decision when I had scored about five. I knew I'd hit it but I didn't know that Robin Bailhache, the umpire, knew that I hit it. But thankfully he gave me not out. I went into lunch the next day at 99 not out and I was so happy to get a century with my parents and friends watching.

He followed this in the next test with a knock of 28 (taking part in a 99 run partnership with Greg Chappell). "I value that 28 with Greg just as high as either of my test hundreds", said Cosier. "That sort of innings means something to the team. And to me."

Cosier was taken to hospital after crashing into a boundary and knocking his head while fielding during South Australia's Gillette Cup semi-final loss to Queensland. He managed to recover and scored 94 and took 4–95 in a state game against Victoria.

Against the West Indies for Australia in the fifth test he then scored 37 in the first innings. He injured his back during the game and did not bat in the second innings and was ruled out of the sixth test. Rick McCosker took his place. He recovered to help South Australia win the Sheffield Shield that year.

=== 1976–77 vs Pakistan ===
Cosier made a slow start to the 1976–77 summer, and was lucky to keep his place in the test side against Pakistan. He also captained South Australia in a number of games. "I loved it", said Cosier. "People said it affected my batting but that's crap." Cosier said his innings of 42 against a Queensland attack led by Jeff Thomson was his best ever for South Australia.

In the first test he made 33 in the first innings and was not out for 25 in the second, when he and Rod Marsh famously refused to go for a victory. Cosier later said "there's no way that I have had any second thoughts about the way Rod or I batted in Adelaide... I loved it."

Cosier was much criticised, including by Ian Chappell in an article in Cricketer magazine in January 1977 which stated:

I must confess I've still yet to be convinced that Cose is ready for test cricket. Last summer he earned his test place, and confirmed it with his century in Melbourne. But since then a question mark has arisen over his dedication to cricket, and also over his ability to play on wickets which are doing a bit. And he is definitely suspect outside his off stump. I'd like to see Gary work harder at his game. He appears to be overweight and I wonder how hard he is prepared to work at his batting at this stage.

Cosier responded with a first innings 168 in the second test, crucial to helping set up an Australian victory. Cosier said Chappell's article "was really the thing that spurred me on to prove him wrong. That article got me a century."

In the third test he top scored in Australia's first innings with 50 but only scored 4 in the second as Australia fell to a defeat.

In a February 1977 interview, Cosier admitted "I've got doubts about my own ability. I'm not convinced I"m a test batsman yet. I've got a long way to go... At the moment I'm playing one good innings and then three bad ones. I don't know why. Maybe I need to relax myself more of perhaps it's got something to do with attitude. All I know is I'm trying to work on it... I've heard about the things they say about me outside the off stump and to an extent I go along with them... I admit I'm a bit overweight."

=== Tour of New Zealand ===
Cosier did not have a particularly memorable tour of New Zealand. In the first test he scored 23 and 2. In the second he made 21.

However he did scored 93 off 92 balls against Northern Districts in a tour game.

=== Centenary Test ===
Cosier kept his place for the Centenary Test. He scored 10 and 4. Cosier was also selected on the 1977 Ashes.

During the game Cosier noticed Austin Robertson handing out brown envelopes to players. Cosier later recalled:

I was told he was handing out a few theatre tickets and I didn't suspect anything because he always looked after the boys. He was close to a number of players, obviously a lot closer than I understood at the time. I didn't have any hint that it wasn't him just organising something for the boys to go to that night.

=== 1977 Ashes ===
A back injury got Cosier's tour off to a poor start, forcing him to miss a game. Things got worse when it was revealed most of the Australian squad had signed to play World Series Cricket. Only four had not been invited: Cosier, Geoff Dymock, Kim Hughes and Craig Serjeant. Cosier:

It was incredible really. In 1977, I flew over to England with the players and that was the flight on which Rodney Marsh broke the world beer drinking record. Three-quarters of the players on that flight had signed these sensational Packer contracts and they were all as drunk as you could imagine. But the secret still didn't get out. I sat beside Hookesy on the flight over and I had been best man at his wedding and not even he breathed a word of it to me... [After I found out] I went up and talked to Hookesy he said: "Sorry mate, I didn't know whether you had signed or not." Hookesy said he had wanted to tell me, but he just couldn't.

Cosier said the revelations greatly affected the tour:

All of a sudden we had two Australian teams on one tour... I certainly felt excluded... At one stage in England I was waiting in a bar for my teammates to come downstairs, but because everyone was up the street with Packer, they never came... I was certainly disappointed to be left out. At that stage I think I had played nine Tests and was averaging 40 and you had other people who were barely Shield cricketers being called up by Packer. I didn't know the reasons why those guys were in it and I wasn't. That is always a question I will wonder about. I certainly kept being mates with Hookesy... It was a strange feeling. There were times when we were there to play for Australia and some blokes were off at a meeting about something else. There were times when there were arguments in the bar that got a lot louder than what they should have been.

Cosier played in the second ODI, taking 5–18 with his medium pacers, but an Australian collapse meant they lost the game.

Cosier did not play a test match on the tour, with David Hookes, Richie Robinson, Craig Serjeant and Kim Hughes all being preferred to him. Cosier:

I didn't play that well in stages of the tour and other players deserved a game. But we got to halfway through the tour and (captain) Greg Chappell came to me and said there was trouble at the top of the order and asked if I would like to open the batting in the county games. I did that and I was quite successful. I think at the end of the tour I finished about fifth in the batting averages. But that didn't seem to make any difference. I was the only one who didn't play a Test match.

Cosier's highlights for the tour were 56 against Glamorgan, 56 against Warwickshire, and 100 against Nottinghamshire.

== World Series Cricket ==
=== 1977–78 vs India ===
The World Series Cricket defections meant that Cosier was one of the few players left in Australian first class cricket with recent test experience. He received a lucrative offer to play for Queensland and moved to Brisbane at the beginning of the summer. A score of 55 runs off 50 balls against West Australia and 62 against South Australia helped ensure his selection for the first test.

For the first test, Cosier was made opener, and scored 19 and 0. An injury meant he missed the second test, but he was back for the third, making 67 and 34, but being unable to prevent an Australian defeat.

In the fourth test he made 17 and 68.

For the fifth test Cosier was put down the order and scored 1 and 34. He also took some crucial catches to help Australia win. Cosier:

To be honest, I wasn't very smart about things. At that stage I was still averaging 40 after nine Tests or so and with the Packer players away, most of the other guys in the Aussie Test team were very new to the team. I thought it was up to me to compete with the Packer boys. When the Packer catchcry was "Lillee getting wickets and Hookesy clearing pickets" I felt that anyone who was coming to watch me play needed to be entertained. I probably played more aggressively than I should have. My feeling was I wanted to give the crowd something to look at when they came in the gates. I should have been more circumspect. In a lot of cases I was happy to get out for 30 or 40. But I felt we needed to compete with WSC boys.

=== 1977–78 Tour of the West Indies ===
Cosier began the West Indies tour well. He scored 84 off 78 balls in the first one-day game. In the first test he made a courageous 46 in Australia's first innings of 90.

In the second test he failed twice, making 1 and 8. But he scored 114 against Guyana in a tour game.

The third test saw Cosier score 9 and 0. He broke a thumb against Windward Islands, could not bat in the second innings and did not play another game on tour.

=== 1978–79 Ashes ===
Cosier began the next summer well with 94 against Victoria.

He was picked for the first test against England, made vice captain to Graham Yallop. During the match it was announced he had signed a 10-year contract with a sporting ground developer worth $50,000 a year.

Playing as opener again he made 1 and 0.

The second test he was put down the order and made 4 and 47; the latter was Australia's second highest score of that innings but by then Cosier had been dropped for Allan Border.

=== One Day Achievements ===
Cosier was kept on for the one day series that summer. He scored a lusty late innings 28 off 14 balls which helped Australia win the 4th IDO.

He then took 3–22 in the next game and scored 8 not out, another Australian victory.

=== 1979 World Cup ===
Cosier was selected in the Australia squad for the 1979 World Cup.

Against England he scored 6 and took 0-24. Against Pakistan he took 3-54 and made a duck. Against Canada – the sole Australian victory – Cosier took 2–17. He was overlooked for the tour of India.

== Later career ==
=== 1979–80 ===
The readmission of WSC players in 1979–80 curtailed his opportunities at state level. He said, "I guess though you could honestly say the relationship between Greg (Chappell) and myself, when he came back from World Series Cricket, and all of a sudden I was playing in Queensland with him, was difficult for a little while."

Cosier started the season well, at one stage averaging 71, but his form tapered off.

He eventually returned to his native Melbourne where his first class career ended with two outings for Victoria in 1980–81. Cosier:

There are quite a few players like me who did really well early in their careers, but didn't consolidate later on. I guess it is like climbing the highest peak on your first climb – where do you go from there, where is the next peak? Players these days have a great support network around them to guide them through that sort of stuff.

== Post-playing career ==
For a number of years Cosier worked in indoor cricket.

In the late 1980s he was a Victorian coach and selector. He lived in Tangier for three years and managed Abdur Rahman Bukhatir's cricket and golf interests. The North African nation boasts an eight-team national league, and proudly claims an indigenous-participation rate of 95%, and Cosier managed the national team, which is an ICC affiliate member.

He returned to Australia and went into coaching and sports management.

Cosier has taken up the sport of Lawn Bowls and currently represents Tarragindi Bowls Club in its first division side.

== Notes ==
- Beecher, Eric, "The Doubts About Cosier", Cricketer, February 1977 p .22-24, 50
