= Centenary Test =

International cricket competition

Centenary Test(s)
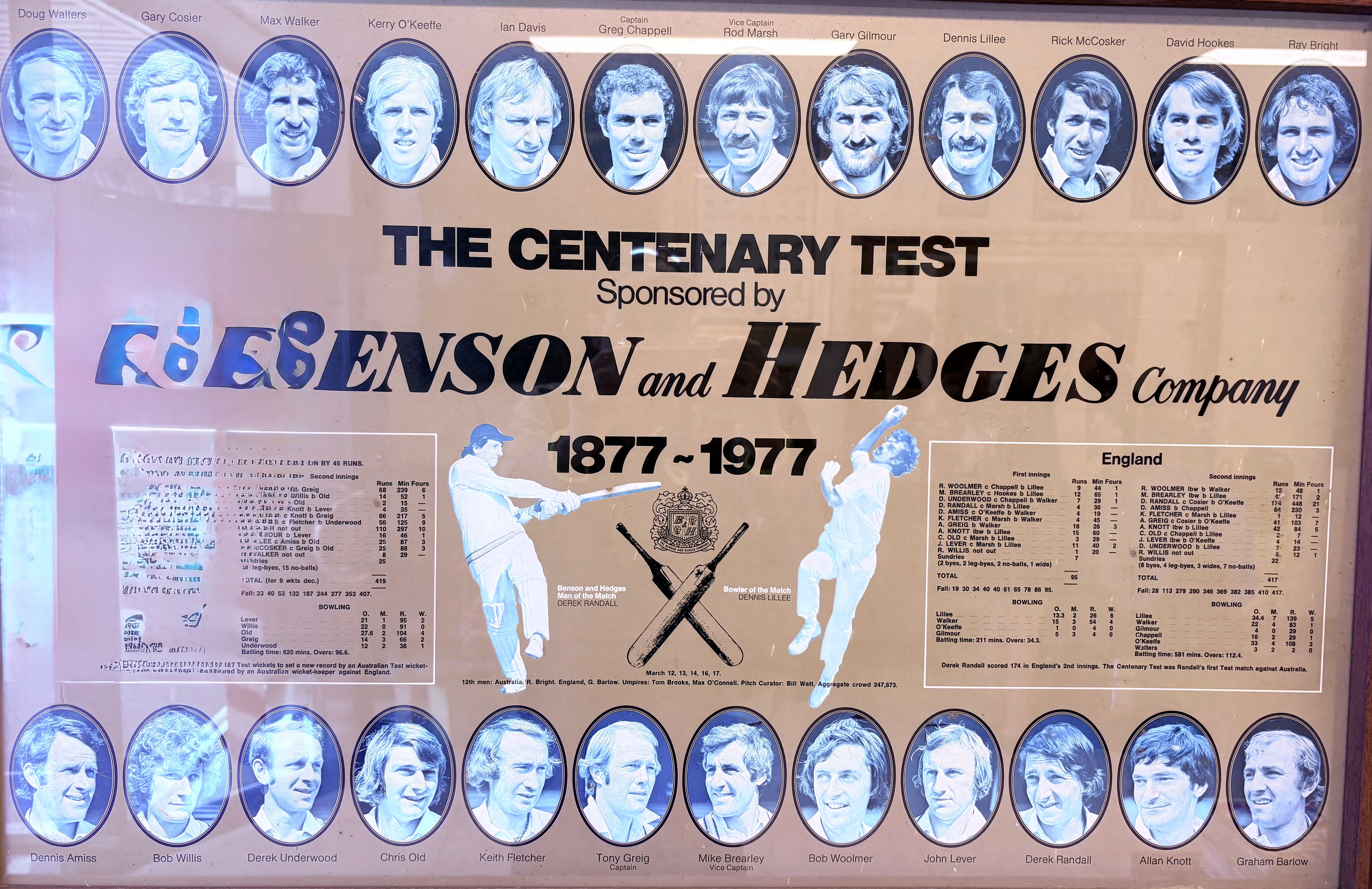
- Countries: Australia; England
- Format: Test cricket
- First edition: 1977
- Latest edition: 1980
- Tournament format: Single cricket match
- Number of teams: 2

The Centenary Tests were two matches of Test cricket played between the English cricket team and the Australian cricket team, the first in 1977 and the second in 1980. These matches were played to mark the 100th anniversaries of the first Test cricket matches played in Australia (1877) and in England (1880) respectively. Neither match was played for The Ashes.

The first Centenary Test was played in March 1977 to commemorate the match that is considered to be the first Test match, played in 1877. Both the 1877 and 1977 matches were played at the Melbourne Cricket Ground in Melbourne, Australia. Remarkably, Australia won both matches by exactly the same margin, 45 runs.

A second Centenary Test was played in 1980 at Lord's in London, to commemorate the first Test match in England, at The Oval in 1880. The 1880 match was the fourth to be considered a Test match, and followed three earlier matches played between England and Australia in Australia (including the 1877 Test). The 1980 match was badly affected by rain on the first two days, and was drawn. This was the last Test match commentated by John Arlott.

== The first Cricket Test match, March 1877 ==
The 1877 match was a timeless Test played from 15 to 19 March 1877, with a rest day on 18 March, with 4-ball overs. Australia scored 245 in the first innings, with 165 from Charles Bannerman, the first Test century, before he retired hurt (over 67% of the total, a Test record that still stands). The England team, captained by James Lillywhite, scored 196 in reply, with Billy Midwinter taking 5/78, the first Test "five for". Australia scored 104 in their second innings, with Alfred Shaw taking 5/38, setting England a target of 153 to win, but England were bowled out for 108, with Tom Kendall taking 7/55.

== Centenary Test, 1977 at the Melbourne Cricket Ground ==
The idea of a celebration match at the Melbourne Cricket Ground to commemorate the centenary of Test cricket was conceived by former Test player and MCC committeeman Hans Ebeling.

Organisation of the event was coordinated between the Melbourne Cricket Club and the Victorian Cricket Association, with sponsorship provided by Benson & Hedges, Trans Australia Airlines (who flew the past and present Australian cricketers to the event), Qantas (who flew the past and present English players in from London), and the Melbourne Hilton Hotel.

In Australia, the game was broadcast on ABC TV and The 0-10 Network; the ABC commentary team consisted of Keith Miller, Paul Sheahan, Frank Tyson and Norman May, while the 0-10 Network commentary team comprised Richie Benaud, Bill Lawry, Ian Chappell (all of whom would later commentate cricket for the Nine Network), Bob Simpson and Geoffrey Boycott.

12–17 March 1977
Scorecard

Australia	v	England
138 (43.6 overs); Greg Chappell 40 (139); Derek Underwood 3/16 (11.6 overs)		95 (34.3 overs); Tony Greig 18 (20); Dennis Lillee 6/26 (13.3 overs)
9/419 d (96.6 overs); Rod Marsh 110* (173); Chris Old 4/104 (27.6 overs)		417 (112.4 overs); Derek Randall 174 (353); Dennis Lillee 5/139 (34.4 overs)

Australia won by 45 runs
Melbourne Cricket Ground, Melbourne, Australia
Umpires: Tom Brooks (AUS) and Max O'Connell (AUS)
Player of the match: Derek Randall (Eng)

- England won the toss and elected to field.
- David Hookes (Aus) made his Test debut.

The Centenary Test was played from 12 to 17 March 1977, with a rest day on 15 March. At that time, Test matches in Australia were played with 8-ball overs. This was the 800th Test match played, and the 225th between the two countries.

=== The teams ===
Australia

- GS Chappell (Queensland) – Captain
- RW Marsh (Western Australia)
- IC Davis (New South Wales)
- RB McCosker (New South Wales)
- GJ Cosier (South Australia)
- DW Hookes (South Australia)
- KD Walters (New South Wales)
- DK Lillee (Western Australia)
- GJ Gilmour (New South Wales)
- KJ O'Keeffe (New South Wales)
- MHN Walker (Victoria)
- RJ Bright (Victoria) – 12th man

England

- AW Greig (Sussex) – Captain
- APE Knott (Kent)
- JM Brearley (Middlesex)
- RA Woolmer (Kent)
- DW Randall (Nottinghamshire)
- DL Amiss (Warwickshire)
- KWR Fletcher (Essex)
- JK Lever (Essex)
- DL Underwood (Kent)
- CM Old (Yorkshire)
- RGD Willis (Warwickshire)
- GD Barlow (Middlesex) – 12th Man

=== Match description ===
Day One (12 March): After the pre-match ceremony, Tony Greig and Greg Chappell walked to the middle of the ground for the coin toss. Chappell had been handed a gold coin specially minted for the occasion. Greig called correctly and chose to field, presumably to shield his openers from having to face Dennis Lillee first.

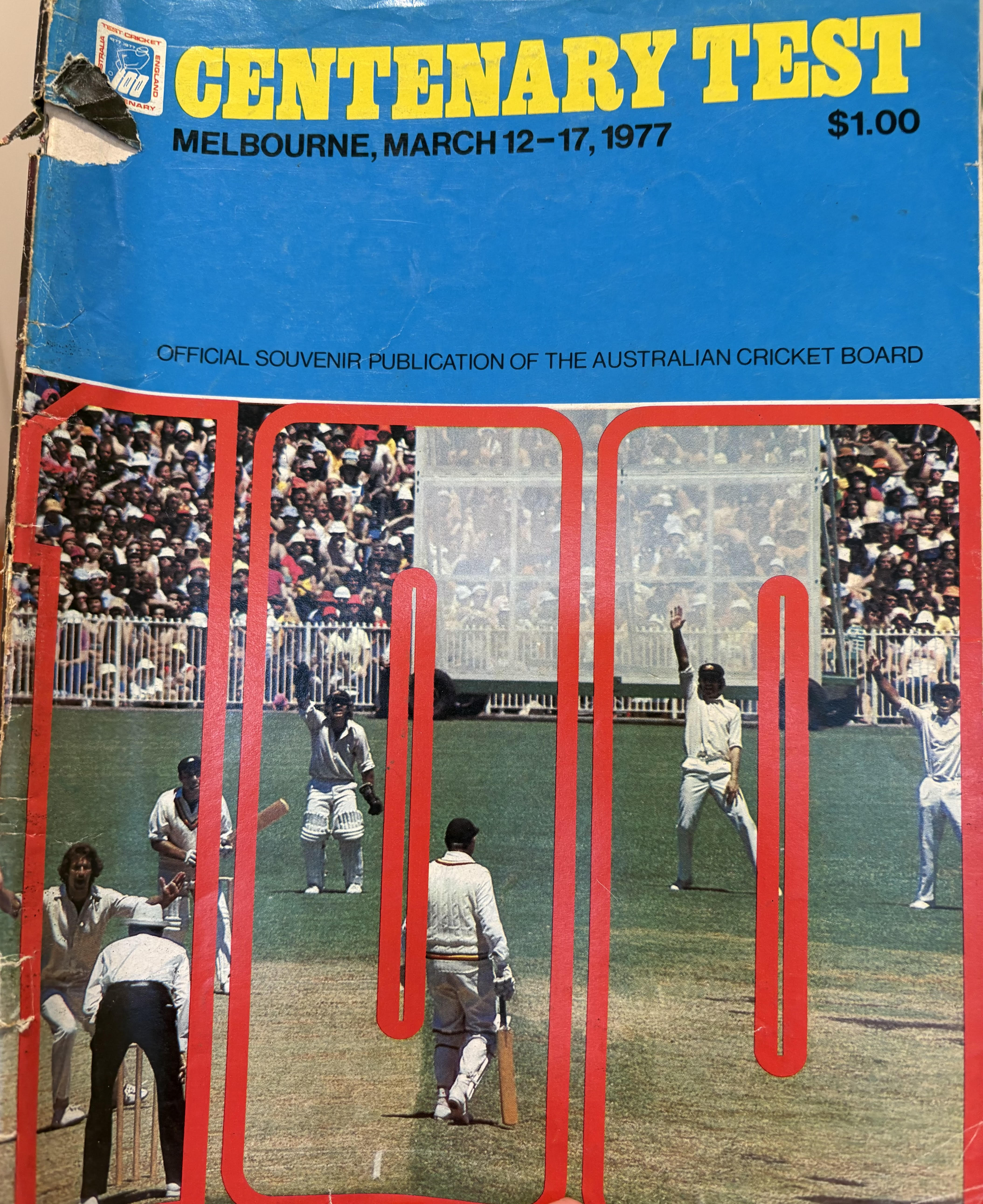
The official match program for the 1977 Centenary Test at the MCG

After Australian opener Ian Davis had fallen cheaply to the left-armer John Lever, the score advanced to thirteen. Bob Willis, working up some good pace, bounced Australia's Rick McCosker, who decided to take on the delivery and play the hook shot. Realising too late that he had been beaten for pace, McCosker was struck flush on the jaw by the ball, which then fell on the stumps. England's joy at capturing the wicket quickly turned to concern when McCosker collapsed to the ground, holding his broken jaw. The opener was helped from the ground, but looked unlikely to take further part in the game. The Australian batsmen appeared tentative and the England bowlers pressed home their advantage, taking the wickets of Gary Cosier, David Hookes and Doug Walters to leave Australia at 5 for 51 mid-afternoon. Hookes played a brief cameo of 17 runs from 19 balls, but it was not a day for fast scoring. Wicketkeeper Rod Marsh joined his captain Greg Chappell for the only substantial partnership of the innings (51), but when Marsh was dismissed for 28 after an hour and a half of batting, the wickets began to fall again. Chappell was the ninth man out after almost four hours of batting – to illustrate the difficulty of the Australians' struggle, the normally aggressive Chappell failed to hit a boundary, while he scored his runs at a strike rate of just 28.7. All out 138 in only 44 overs, Australia had left England one hour's batting time before stumps. The English negotiated the period reasonably well, losing only Bob Woolmer for 9 in a total of 1 for 29. The visitors were clearly in the ascendancy at this point.

Day Two (13 March): Australia found the inspiration they needed to get back into the match via Dennis Lillee. He took the wicket of Mike Brearley straight away, and within half an hour, England had crumbled to 5 for 40. Tony Greig mounted a very brief counterattack, hitting three fours, but he succumbed for 18 (the top score of the innings) and England finished with 95 off 34.3 overs. Lillee dominated proceedings, capturing a personal best of 6 for 26, ably supported by the medium pace of Max Walker, whose four wickets destroyed the middle order. With three and a half hours to go, to be followed by three full days of play, Australia needed not only a big score, but a long innings to allow the wicket to wear and make life difficult for England chasing a big target. Australia promoted spin bowler Kerry O'Keefe to open the batting in place of McCosker and he did a good job, lasting until the new ball lost its shine. But England struck a decisive blow after O'Keefe departed, removing the Australian danger man Chappell for two and Cosier for four, leaving Australia 3 for 53. Opener Ian Davis was still at the crease and he combined with veteran Doug Walters to add a half century partnership in the time remaining before stumps, leaving the match evenly poised.

Day Three (14 March): Starting cautiously, Australia lost both overnight batsmen to the bowling of Greig. Both Davis and Walters had got into the sixties but failed to go on: Australia needed someone to make a hundred. Hookes and Marsh came together, and the débutant Hookes cut loose by belting Greig for five consecutive boundaries to pass 50, one of the most famous passages of play in the match. Just when he looked to be the man to make a match-winning score, Hookes was deceived by the wiles of spinner Derek Underwood, leaving Australia at 6 for 244, a lead of 287 with all of the recognised batsman back in the pavilion. However, Marsh swung the game Australia's way with some intelligent batting, taking runs when available and shepherding the tail enders from the strike. When the eighth wicket fell at 353, McCosker unexpectedly reappeared, his face tightly bound with bandages to hold his jaw together. The crowd recognised his courage as he batted in a cap – the batting helmet was not introduced to the game until the following year. He finished the day unbeaten on 17 and Marsh was five runs short of becoming the first Australian wicketkeeper to make a Test century against England. Australia led by 430, with the next day a rest day.

Day Four (16 March): Marsh duly reached his third Test century (173 balls, 295 minutes) before Chappell declared at 9 for 419 (Marsh 110 not out), setting England a target of 463, which would be a world-record fourth innings chase if successful. Walker kept Australia on top by grabbing the wicket of Bob Woolmer with the score at 28, but England finally managed to steady. Derek Randall, an eccentric presence at the wicket who was yet to achieve much at Test level, started playing some shots and generally frustrating the Australians with his antics. His unique presence deflected much of the tension, as did a partnership of 85 with Mike Brearley. When Brearley fell, Amiss continued supporting Randall, who proceeded to 87 not out at stumps. England needed 272 on the last day with eight wickets in hand.

Day Five (17 March): Much rested on the shoulders of Randall and Amiss, but after playing one of his best knocks against Australia, Amiss lost concentration and fell to the part-time medium pace of Chappell for 64. By this time, Randall was well beyond his century, his first in Tests, and looked capable of winning the match if he was well supported at the other end. With his total on 161, Randall was given out to a catch by Marsh, but Marsh indicated that he didn't take the ball cleanly, so the Australians recalled the batsman. After a promising half century partnership with Greig had hauled England to within 117 runs of victory, Randall fell to a brilliant one handed catch by Cosier from the spin of O'Keeffe. He made 174 off 353 balls in a marathon 446 minutes. With the breach made, Lillee returned to attack the tail and although England continued to fight, the wickets tumbled at regular intervals. Finally, Lillee trapped Alan Knott on the crease with a fast, straight delivery to earn an lbw decision and victory for his country. It took a few moments before it was realised that the winning margin of 45 runs was exactly the same as it had been 100 years before. Randall received the man of the match award, ahead of Lillee (who took eleven wickets for the match) and Marsh.

== The first Cricket Test match in England, September 1880 ==
The first test match in England resulted in a victory to the hosts by 5 wickets. The three-day match was played at The Oval from 6 to 8 September 1880. The England team included three Grace brothers, W. G. Grace, E. M. Grace and G. F. Grace. England won the toss and batted first, with W. G. Grace scoring 152, the first century by an Englishman, in England's first innings total of 420. Australia were bowled out for 149, followed on, and scored 327 in their second innings, including 153 not out for Billy Murdoch. England lost 5 wickets before reaching the target of 57.

== Centenary Test, 1980 at Lord's ==
28 August – 2 September 1980
Scorecard

Australia	v	England
385/5 d (134 overs); KM Hughes 117 (209); CM Old 3/91 (35 overs)		205 (63.2 overs); G Boycott 62 (146); LS Pascoe 5/59 (18 overs)
189/4 d (53.2 overs); KM Hughes 84 (99); CM Old 3/47 (20 overs)		244/3 (82 overs); G Boycott 128* (252); DK Lillee 1/53 (19 overs)

Match drawn
Lord's, London
Umpires: HD Bird (ENG) and DJ Constant (ENG)

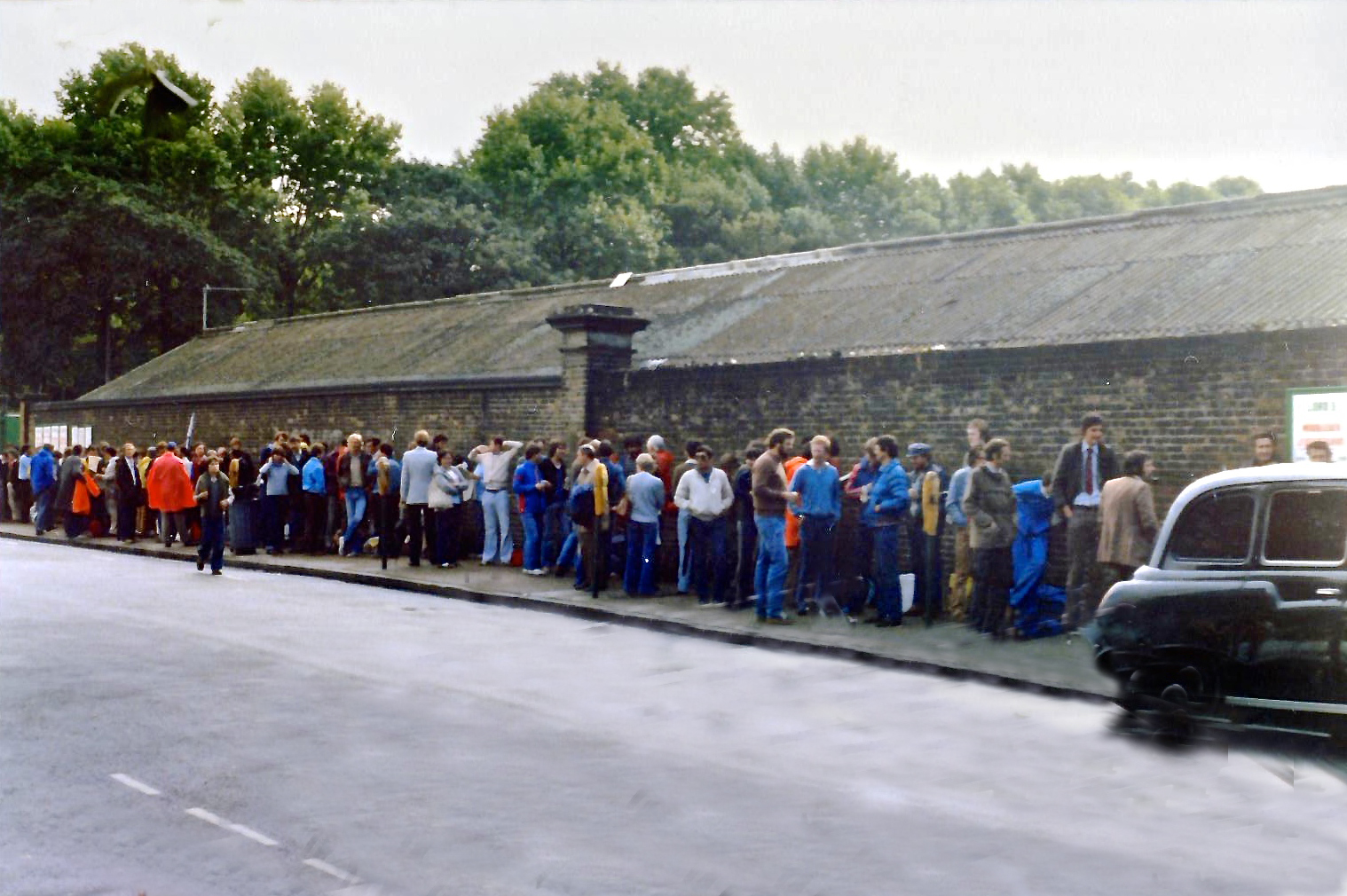
Spectators queuing for the match at Lord's

The 1980 Centenary Test was played at Lord's from 28 August to 2 September 1980, with a rest day on 31 August. It was the 885th Test match played and the 240th between the two countries.

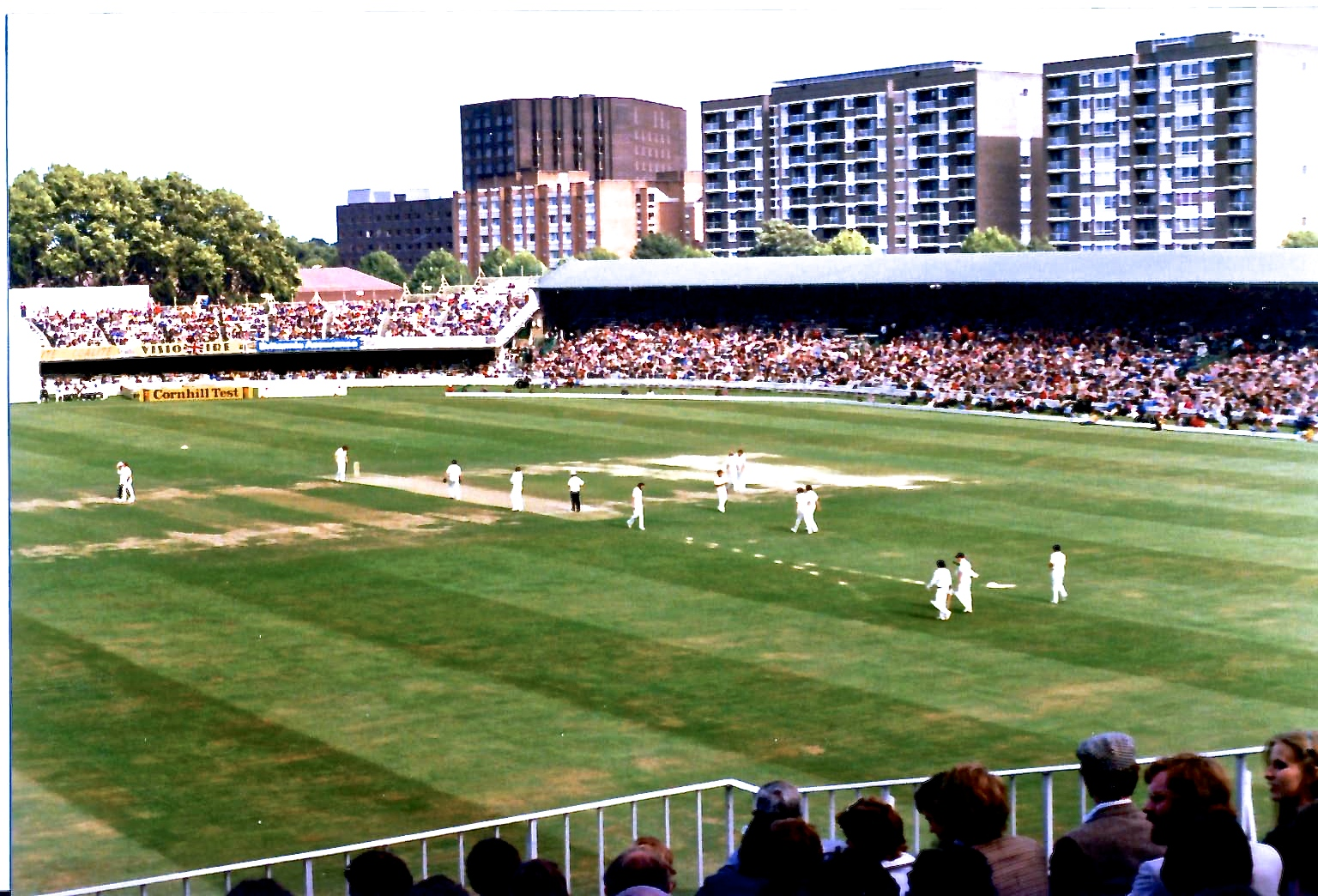

=== The teams ===
Australia

- GS Chappell (Queensland) – Captain
- RW Marsh (Western Australia)
- GM Wood (Western Australia)
- BM Laird (Western Australia)
- KJ Hughes (Western Australia)
- AR Border (Queensland)
- LS Pascoe (New South Wales)
- DK Lillee (Western Australia)
- RJ Bright (Victoria)
- AA Mallett (South Australia)
- GN Yallop (Victoria)

England

- IT Botham (Somerset) – Captain
- DL Bairstow (Yorkshire)
- G Boycott (Yorkshire)
- GA Gooch (Essex)
- CWJ Athey (Yorkshire)
- DI Gower (Leicestershire)
- MW Gatting (Middlesex)
- P Willey (Northamptonshire)
- JE Emburey (Middlesex)
- CM Old (Yorkshire)
- M Hendrick (Derbyshire)

Australia, captained by Greg Chappell, won the toss and elected to bat. Although the first two days were affected by rain, Australia ended the first day on 227 for 2 and the second on 278 for 4, declaring at 385 for 5 on the third day, with centuries for Graeme Wood (112) and Kim Hughes (117). England were bowled out for 205, with Len Pascoe taking 5/59 and including a duck for England captain, Ian Botham. Australia declared on 189 for 4 in their second innings, setting England an unlikely target of 370 in less than one day to win. Geoffrey Boycott batted out the rest of the day, scoring 128 not out, leaving England on 244 for 3 at the close, and the match was drawn.

== See also ==
- Bicentennial Test
- 150th Anniversary Test match
- World Series Cricket

== Bibliography ==
- Batchelder, Alf; Rusden, Ann; Webster, Ray; Williams, Ken. "The Centenary Test – Melbourne Cricket Ground, March 1977" (PDF). MCC Library.
- Nicholls, Barry (2016). The test of the century : the story behind 1977's Centenary Test. New Holland. ISBN 9781742577753.
