= New South Wales selection bias =

Cricket controversy in Australia

New South Wales selection bias is a claimed bias of selectors of the Australian cricket teams towards players from New South Wales. It was alluded to in a quote by former South Australian captain David Hookes who said that, "when they give out the baggy blue cap in New South Wales, they give you a baggy green one in a brown paper bag as well to save making two presentations". Hookes' comment came at a time when, especially during the 1980s, there was public speculation that strong performances by non-NSW players were often ignored by the Australian selectors in favour of seemingly under-performing NSW players who were selected for the Test and/or One-Day team.

Allegations of this bias have been made by a number of past and present players, including Victoria's Brad Hodge, who claimed that his non-selection in the Australian side was due in part to the bias.

== Statistical basis ==
Statistics have been misused to deny and clearly support the bias. Deniers of the bias highlight the few New South Wales players who have suffered at the hands of selectors, and ignore the underperforming NSW players who have been given a paved road to national selection.

Out of the list of the top 50 run-scorers in the Sheffield Shield, the nine players who did not play a single Test came from every state except New South Wales and Western Australia. Out of the list of the top 50 wicket takers, the eight players who did not play a single Test came from every state except New South Wales.
