= Derek Randall =

English cricketer

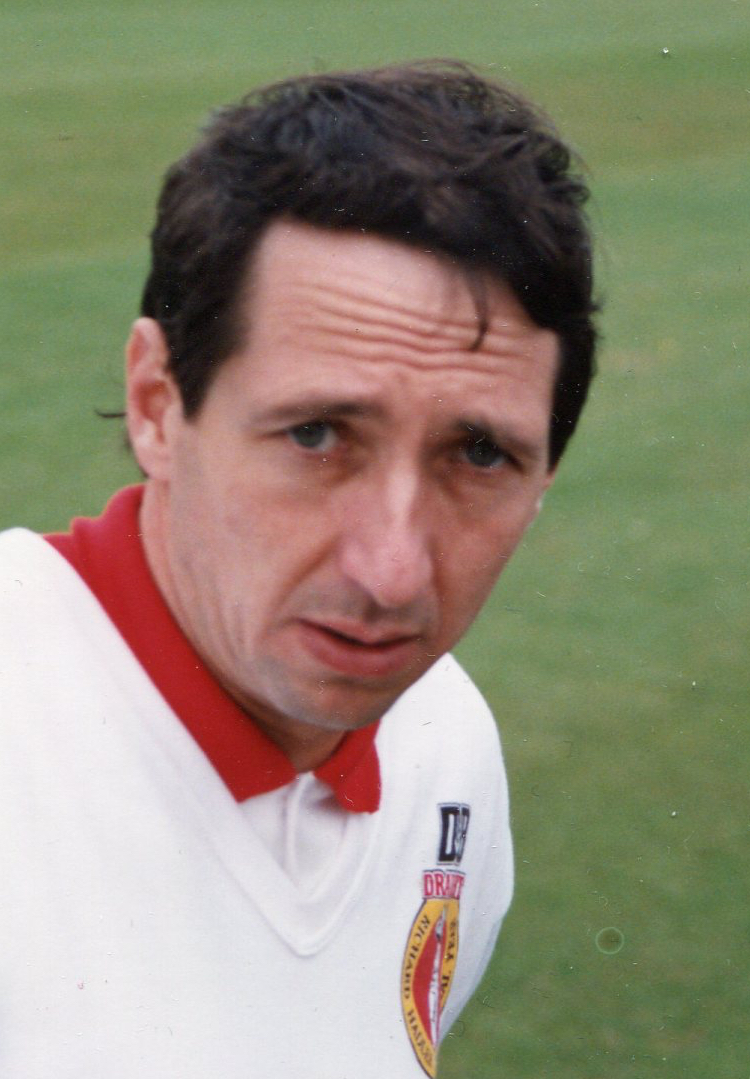
- Randall in 1990

Personal information
- Full name: Derek William Randall
- Born: 24 February 1951 (age 75); Retford, Nottinghamshire, England
- Batting: Right-handed
- Bowling: Right-arm medium

International information
- National side: England
- Test debut (cap 472): 1 January 1977 v India
- Last Test: 14 June 1984 v West Indies
- ODI debut (cap 37): 28 August 1976 v West Indies
- Last ODI: 24 March 1985 v Australia

Domestic team information
- Years: Team
- 1971–1993: Nottinghamshire
- 1994–2000: Suffolk

Career statistics
Competition	Test	ODI	FC	LA
Matches	47	49	488	467
Runs scored	2,470	1,067	28,456	12,300
Batting average	33.37	26.67	38.14	32.28
100s/50s	7/12	0/5	52/161	6/75
Top score	174	88	237	149*
Balls bowled	16	2	489	36
Wickets	0	1	13	1
Bowling average	–	2.00	31.76	39.00
5 wickets in innings	–	0	0	0
10 wickets in match	–	0	0	0
Best bowling	–	1/2	3/15	1/2
Catches/stumpings	31/–	25/–	361/–	156/–
Medal record
Men's Cricket
Representing England
ICC Cricket World Cup
Runner-up	1979 England
- Source: ESPNcricinfo, 23 August 2020

Derek William Randall (born 24 February 1951) is an English former cricketer, who played first-class cricket for Nottinghamshire and Tests and ODIs for England in the late 1970s and early 1980s. He was a part of the English squad that finished as runners-up at the 1979 Cricket World Cup.

Known to cricketing colleagues and fans as "Arkle" after the racehorse, but always "Rags" to himself, he was one of the Wisden Cricketers of the Year in 1980. The cricket writer Colin Bateman said, "The Retford imp was, and still is, one of the most fondly admired figures in the game ... the rolling gait and big sad eyes make him Chaplinesque – and like all clowns, there is pathos behind the public image ... At times, genius sat on Randall's shoulders – the only trouble was it would not stop fidgeting". Randall played 47 Tests and 49 One Day International matches for England as a right-handed batsman before retiring to become a coach and cricket writer.

== First-class career ==
Randall first came to note as a cover fielder, as one-day cricket forced fielding standards to improve. His run out of Gordon Greenidge in the 1979 Cricket World Cup final highlighted this, and his partnership with David Gower was a feature of the successful England team of the immediate era after Kerry Packer had announced the onset of World Series Cricket. Known for his eccentric movement at the crease, Randall was a determined batsman, specialising in hooks, pulls, cuts and cover drives, the first being used most memorably against Dennis Lillee in the Centenary Test in Melbourne in 1977 when he made 174. This was the highest Test score by any Nottinghamshire batsman playing for England (a record Randall held until Tim Robinson made an innings one run higher at Headingley against Australia in 1985).

After learning his cricket at Retford Cricket Club, Randall made his Nottinghamshire second XI debut in 1969, and his first-class debut against Essex at the end of May 1972, scoring 78 from number eight in the batting order, joint top-scoring with captain Brian Bolus, with the next highest score being Garry Sobers' 32. He won plaudits for his talent in the covers, won his Nottinghamshire cap in 1973 and went on to score 28,456 runs in all first-class cricket. Randall batted for the successful Nottinghamshire team of the 1980s, twice winning the County Championship in 1981 and 1987.

With his team needing eighteen to win from the final over of the 1985 NatWest Trophy final, he hit sixteen from the first five balls, only to be caught in the outfield from the final delivery. He did finish on the winning side in the final of the same tournament two years later, and in the final of the Benson and Hedges Cup in 1989.

He compiled fifty-two hundreds in all, and made 209 and 146 in the same game against Middlesex in 1979, a feat unequalled at Trent Bridge. He scored 1,000 runs in a season eight times, took 361 catches and 13 wickets at 31.00. He was popular with the crowds, who found his enthusiastic fielding and comic antics entertaining. He was famous for running, rather than walking, towards the batsman in the covers as the bowler delivered the ball and was responsible for many run-outs.

He retired from first-class cricket in 1993, appearing that year in a testimonial match for an England XI against an Australian XI at Nottingham, a match featuring many players whom he played with and against in Ashes cricket (including in the Centenary Test). The match ended in a tie. Later he turned out in Minor Counties cricket for Suffolk, playing in the NatWest Trophy at the age of 49, and in a match for "Old Suffolk" in 2004.

== International career ==
Randall made his one-day international debut against West Indies in 1976, and his Test debut in India a few months later. He made his first Test century during the Centenary Test, his fifth test at Melbourne. Randall here scored his highest test score, 174, against an Australian attack led by Dennis Lillee. He famously doffed his cap to Lillee, after narrowly evading a savage bouncer, stating, "No point in hitting me there, mate, there's nothing in it." When finally dismissed he left the ground by the wrong gate, and found himself climbing up towards the Royal enclosure where Queen Elizabeth II was watching the day's play. "She was very nice about it", he told the BBC. "She smiled. Someone else quickly put me right."

The following summer, during the Ashes series against Australia, Randall, playing his first Test on his home ground of Trent Bridge, was the innocent victim of a notorious mix-up when he was run out as non-striker by England team-mate Geoff Boycott, who was returning to international cricket after three years' self-imposed exile. Boycott hit the ball back towards the bowler Jeff Thomson before darting up the wicket, leaving Randall stranded. Boycott was booed by the home crowd, and later wrote: "if the ground had opened and swallowed me at that moment it would have been a mercy". Fortunately England still won the match, Randall scoring the winning run, and in the next Test at Headingley, Randall was involved in run-out action for the right reason. As Graham Holburn put it, Randall's "lightning run-out of Rick McCosker ... amazed all who witnessed it". In the same game Randall took the catch which clinched the Ashes, turning a cartwheel in celebration.

He had less success on his first tour, of Pakistan (3 tests) and New Zealand (3 tests) in 1977-78: the most noteworthy incident coming in the 2nd New Zealand Test in Christchurch, where for a second time he was run-out while Boycott was batting at the other end - although Boycott could not be blamed on this occasion, for Randall was "Mankadded", run-out by the bowler while backing-up out of his crease. He missed the following summer series in England - also against New Zealand and Pakistan - but was recalled for the next winter's tour.

Randall performed well against Australia again during the next Ashes series in 1978/79, which brought a 5–1 win for England, and two man of the match performances for Randall. His innings of 150 in a series dominated by fast bowlers was the highlight, coming in England's second innings of the 4th Test, as they overturned a first-innings deficit of over 100 to win the match. His other match award came in the 1st Test, where he top-scored for England in both innings with 75 and 74*, being at the crease when the winning runs were scored – in the process, also, being involved in a third run-out involving Boycott: this time it was Boycott who was run out, when Randall called for a quick single and Boycott hesitated before setting off. Randall also scored centuries against New Zealand and India, and one from the position of opener against Pakistan, but he struggled against the West Indian attack of 1984, when he was asked to bat at number three in the first Test match of the summer, and was never to return to the Test team.

In one-day internationals England stuck with him a little longer, his cover fielding bringing extra value, as was demonstrated when he helped England to their first Cricket World Cup final, though finishing on the losing side. He played the last of his 49 one-day internationals in March 1985.

Randall was often the selectors' scapegoat for England's failings, and his Test batting positions ranged from number one to seven. Bateman commented about Randall, "he was always available, always loyal, and his Test average in no way flattered him". He played in more Tests than other Nottinghamshire alumni such as Reg Simpson, Harold Larwood, Bill Voce, Joe Hardstaff senior, Joe Hardstaff junior and Arthur Shrewsbury.

=== Test centuries ===
- 174 v Australia at Melbourne (1977)
- 150 v Australia at Sydney (1979)
- 126 v India at Lord's (1982)
- 105 v Pakistan at Edgbaston (1982)
- 115 v Australia at Perth (1982)
- 164 v New Zealand at Wellington (1984)
- 104 v New Zealand at Auckland (1984)

== Retirement ==
After retirement from first-class cricket Randall coached Cambridge University and Bedford School; when Alastair Cook came through the School's First XI, Randall recommended that the youngster be picked for the ECB National Academy. He also coached Bedfordshire in the Minor County Championship. The 'Derek Randall Suite' at Trent Bridge is named in his honour.

His books include The Young Player's Guide to Cricket and his autobiography, The Sun Has Got His Hat On (1984).
