= Chris Old =

English cricketer

Personal information
- Full name: Christopher Middleton Old
- Born: 22 December 1948 (age 77); Middlesbrough, Yorkshire, England
- Nickname: Chilly
- Height: 6 ft 3 in (1.91 m)
- Batting: Left-handed
- Bowling: Right arm fast-medium
- Role: Bowler

International information
- National side: England
- Test debut (cap 455): 30 December 1972 v India
- Last Test: 2 August 1981 v Australia
- ODI debut (cap 23): 5 September 1973 v Australia
- Last ODI: 4 February 1981 v West Indies

Domestic team information
- Years: Team
- 1966–1982: Yorkshire
- 1981/82–1982/83: Northern Transvaal
- 1983–1985: Warwickshire

Career statistics
Competition	Test	ODI	FC	LA
Matches	46	32	379	314
Runs scored	845	338	7,756	3,492
Batting average	14.82	18.77	20.84	19.72
100s/50s	0/2	0/1	6/27	0/13
Top score	65	51*	116	82*
Balls bowled	8,858	1,755	57,822	15,604
Wickets	143	45	1,070	418
Bowling average	28.11	22.20	23.48	20.86
5 wickets in innings	4	0	39	3
10 wickets in match	0	0	2	0
Best bowling	7/50	4/8	7/20	5/19
Catches/stumpings	22/–	8/–	214/–	72/–
Medal record
Men's Cricket
Representing England
ICC Cricket World Cup
Runner-up	1979 England
- Source: CricInfo, 17 November 2008

Chris Old (born Christopher Middleton Old, 22 December 1948) is a former English cricketer, who played 46 Tests and 32 ODIs from 1972 to 1981. A right-arm fast-medium bowler and lower order left-handed batsman, Old was a key feature of the Yorkshire side between 1969 and 1983, before finishing his career at Warwickshire in 1985. As a Test bowler for England he took 143 wickets, and scored useful runs in the famous 1981 Ashes series' Headingley victory. He was a part of the English squad which finished as runners-up at the 1979 Cricket World Cup.

== Early life ==
The youngest of three brothers, Chris Old first made his mark in school cricket as a left-handed batsman playing for schools in Durham, Middlesbrough and other parts of England. In 1962 he was recommended to Yorkshire, following in the footsteps of his older brothers Alan and Malcolm, who had already preceded him. He made his debut, aged 15, for Yorkshire 2nd XI against Lincolnshire at Grimsby in August 1964 as a batsman, scoring 26 in the first innings and 8 not out in the second, but he was subsequently encouraged by resident coach Arthur Mitchell to develop his bowling. He was still predominantly a batsman when he made his debut for the Yorkshire first team as a 17-year-old against Hampshire in 1966, scoring 3 runs and conceding 8 runs from 3 overs without taking a wicket. That was the start of a first-class cricket career lasting 20 years from 1966 to 1986.

== First-class career ==
He was mentored by the resident Yorkshire opening bowlers, Fred Trueman and Tony Nicholson, who took over 2800 wickets between them for the county and following Fred Truemans retirement in 1968 he became Nicholsons opening new ball bowling partner. He won his Yorkshire cap in 1969, and was named as the Cricket Writer's Club Young Cricketer of the Year in 1970. Old hit the 3rd fastest century of all time at Edgbaston in 1977, with 100 runs from 72 balls in 37 minutes, with the second 50 taking just 9 minutes. This feat won him the Walter Lawrence Trophy for the fastest century of the year. He was also nominated as one of the five Wisden Cricketers of 1979.

'Chilly' (so known because he appeared on the scorecard as "C.Old") subsequently took the Yorkshire captaincy in 1981, but it was not a happy period. The next season, suffering from personal problems, he was ousted from the role to allow the 50-year-old, Ray Illingworth, to take charge on the field. He then moved on to Warwickshire for three seasons (1983–1985) and he also appeared for Northern Transvaal in South Africa between 1981 and 1983. His valedictory first-class cricket appearance was for a Brian Close XI against the touring New Zealand side at Scarborough in September 1986. In 379 first-class matches he took 1,070 first-class wickets at the average of 23.48 and scored 7,756 first-class runs with six centuries. He finished off his domestic cricket career with a season of minor counties cricket, playing 8 matches for Northumberland in 1987, with the highlight being 6 - 98 against Durham at Chester-le-Street in July.

== Test cricketer ==
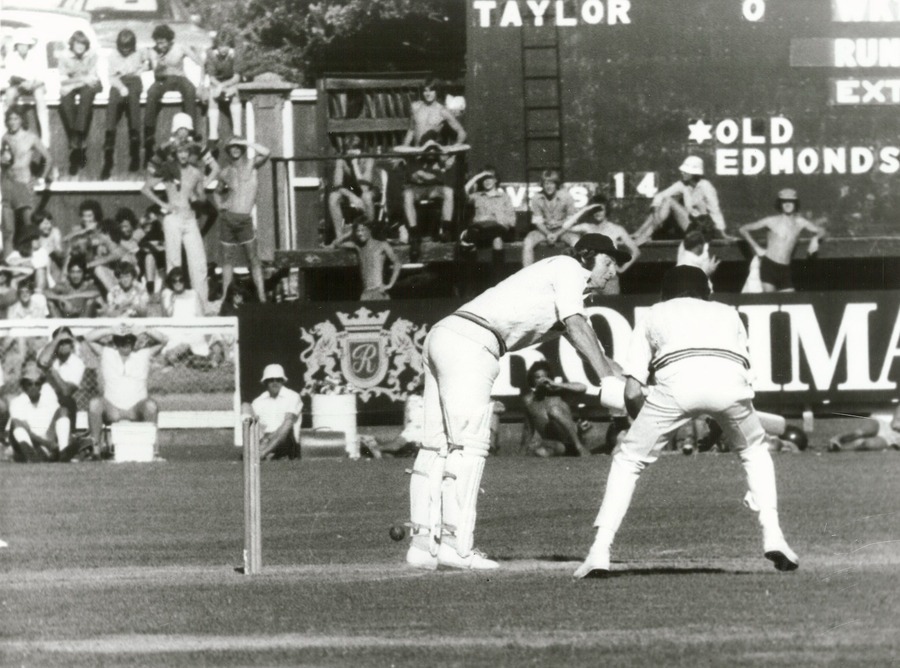
Chris Old batting in Wellington vs NZ, February 1978

He made his Test debut in the Second Test against India at Calcutta in December 1972. His first victim was the great Sunil Gavaskar whom he caught off the bowling of Derek Underwood as the first Indian wicket to fall. He produced a notable all-round performance scoring 33 and 17 not out and taking 2 for 72 and 4 for 43 but still finished on the losing side as India won by 28 runs. Over the next 9 years he played in 46 Test matches taking 143 wickets and scoring 845 runs.

One of his most notable performances was taking four wickets in five balls on the opening day of the Test match against Pakistan at Edgbaston in June 1978, the wicketless third ball being a no-ball. Bowling at pace from the City End, the second ball of his nineteenth over was edged by Wasim Raja to wicket-keeper Bob Taylor before his third ball nipped back through the gate to remove Wasim Bari's off stump. Old's fourth ball, the no-ball, was edged by Iqbal Qasim into the ground but Qasim nicked a late outswinger to the keeper off the next legitimate delivery, before Sikander Bakht found the safe hands of Graham Roope at second slip. Old thus equalled the record of four wickets in five balls set by Maurice Allom on his Test debut at Lancaster Park, Christchurch in 1929–30, a feat which has since been repeated by Pakistan's Wasim Akram.

When India under A. Wadekar toured England in 1974, England swept the series 3–0. In the 2nd test, England batted first and made 629, India were then bowled out for 302 and followed on, and in the Indian second innings Chris Old took 5-21 and Arnold took 4–19, and together they bowled India out for 42, their lowest-ever test score.

However, he is probably best remembered for one of the key second-innings batting partnerships with Ian Botham during the famous Headingley Ashes game of 1981, where they put on 67 crucial runs for the 9th wicket. He followed this up by taking the key wicket of Allan Border who he clean bowled for a duck in the Australian second innings. He was the only England cricketer to play in both Centenary Test Matches against Australia in 1977 at Melbourne and 1980 at Lord's, alongside Greg Chappell, Dennis Lillee and Rodney Marsh for Australia. Old turned down an invitation from Tony Greig to play in Kerry Packer's rebel World Series Cricket, fearing the withdrawal of the traditional benefit season offered by Yorkshire. He subsequently joined the rebel South African Breweries English touring side in South Africa during 1982 effectively ending his Test career with the resulting 3-year ban from international cricket.

He subsequently went to Australia to play in a veterans three-match series, Old Australia XI v Old England XI in 1988, and five years later made a final appearance for an England XI v an Australian XI in a 36 over per side game for Derek Randall's Testimonial at Trent Bridge in June 1993. None of these later matches had first-class status.

== One-day international cricketer ==
Old was the most successful bowler in the early days of one-day international cricket, and by the end of the first decade of the format had taken more wickets than any other bowler in the world in the format (assisted by the fact that England had played more matches than any other team to that point). He also played for England in two world cups, making his highest ODI score in the first tournament in 1975 (51 against India), and taking his best ODI bowling figures, 4 wickets for 8 runs, in the second tournament in 1979 in a match against Canada. In the latter tournament he appeared in the final, where England were beaten by the West Indies.

== Injury problems ==
There is little doubt that he would have played more Test cricket had he not been so prone to injuries. He already had surgery on both of his knees during 1970 and 1971 before making his England debut in 1972. He became a regular member of the England squad for almost a decade. A skilful and accurate right-arm swing bowler and powerful late order left-handed hitter, he was once described by his England captain Mike Brearley as a talent to rival Ian Botham. Despite being a fine natural athlete, and possessing a natural sideways on action, he was continually hampered by regular injury problems and had a tendency to fall prey to 'niggles' in his back and legs, to such an extent that the first bowling machine installed at Lord's was nicknamed Chris Old, due to a propensity for breaking down so often. His departure from the field later in his career to the physiotherapist's table became part of cricket folklore. He never completed any of the ten series that he played abroad, and his only ever-present home series was against India and Pakistan in 1974, when in six Tests he took twenty-five wickets at twenty-two apiece, just emphasising what might have been under different circumstances.

== Post cricket ==
After struggling to cope with retirement for several years, Old acquired and managed his 'Clipper Fish Restaurant' in Praa Sands, Cornwall, with his second wife Letitia, in 2002. Subsequently, he sold the restaurant amid the economic recession in 2009 and it was revealed in the press, during 2012, that he was working at Sainsbury's. He still coaches a local cricket club in Falmouth and tutors cricket coaching courses.

His brother, Alan Old, is a former England rugby union international, who played one first-class match for Warwickshire against Cambridge University in 1969, and also played Minor Counties cricket for Durham in the 1970s.
