= Andrew Sincock =

Australian cricketer

Personal information
- Full name: Andrew Sincock
- Born: 7 June 1951 (age 75); Adelaide, South Australia
- Batting: Right-handed
- Bowling: Right-arm fast-medium
- Role: Bowler

Domestic team information
- Years: Team
- 1974/75–1983/84: South Australia

Career statistics
Competition	First-class	List A
Matches	39	4
Runs scored	625	2
Batting average	20.83	–
100s/50s	0/0	0/0
Top score	47	1*
Balls bowled	6,775	171
Wickets	98	4
Bowling average	38.94	22.75
5 wickets in innings	4	0
10 wickets in match	0	0
Best bowling	7/40	3/23
Catches/stumpings	17/–	1/–
- Source: , 28 February 2019

Andrew Sincock OAM (born 7 June 1951) is a former first-class cricketer who played for South Australia. He was a fast bowler.

Sincock was vice captain on the Australian school boys tour of the West Indies in 1969–70.

He made his first class debut in 1974 and was the opening bowler for the 1981/82 South Australian Sheffield Shield winning team. That season he took his best figures 5-56.

After retirement he was Head Coach of the West End Redbacks and AIS Cricket Academy. Sincock was elected to the South Australian Cricket Association (SACA) Board in 2000 and was vice president in 2013. He was awarded the Order of Australia Medal in 2017 for services to cricket. He has Degrees in Economics and Education.
