= Richie Robinson =

Australian cricketer (born 1946)

Personal information
- Full name: Richard Daryl Robinson
- Born: 8 June 1946 (age 80); East Melbourne, Victoria
- Batting: Right-handed
- Role: wicket-keeper

International information
- National side: Australia
- Test debut (cap 278): 16 June 1977 v England
- Last Test: 11 August 1977 v England
- ODI debut (cap 38): 4 June 1977 v England
- Last ODI: 6 June 1977 v England

Domestic team information
- Years: Team
- 1971/72–1981/82: Victoria

Career statistics
Competition	Test	ODI	FC	LA
Matches	3	2	97	20
Runs scored	100	82	4,776	370
Batting average	16.66	41.00	39.80	23.12
100s/50s	0/0	0/1	7/22	0/1
Top score	34	70	185	70
Catches/stumpings	4/–	3/1	289/40	16/7
- Source: Cricinfo, 12 December 2005

Richard Daryl Robinson (born 8 June 1946) is a former Australian international cricketer who played in three Test matches and two One Day Internationals, all in 1977.

During a first-class career that spanned from 1971 to 1982, Robinson was widely recognised as the second best wicketkeeper in Australia, behind the formidable Rod Marsh and would no doubt have played more Tests had Marsh not played. Although a wicketkeeper batsman in state cricket, Robinson's three Tests were as a specialist batsman.

Robinson captained Victoria and played World Series Cricket, notably keeping wicket for the Cavaliers on the Cavalier Country Tour in 1978/79 playing 17 matches, scoring 315 runs at 22.50, with 31 catches and 8 stumpings.

Following his retirement from first-class cricket, Robinson coached Queensland before moving to Darwin, Northern Territory to play for Tracy Village Cricket Club, and was awarded the Darwin district Player of the Year award in 1993. In 2013 Robinson was appointed coach of Tracy Village.

== Career ==
Robinson had a superb 1976–77 season scoring 828 first class runs at 82.80 including four centuries with a top score of 185. He was selected on the 1977 Ashes tour as a backup keeper to Rod Marsh. Australia's batsmen struggled on the tour, and Robinson was selected as a specialist batsman in three tests.

He signed to play World Series Cricket which meant he missed the next two seasons of first class cricket.

He played three more seasons of first class cricket until he retired.
