= Rick McCosker =

Australian cricketer (born 1946)

Rick McCosker OAM
Personal information
- Full name: Richard Bede McCosker
- Born: 11 December 1946 (age 79); Inverell, New South Wales, Australia
- Batting: Right-handed
- Bowling: Right-arm leg-break
- Role: Opening batsman

International information
- National side: Australia
- Test debut (cap 272): 4 January 1975 v England
- Last Test: 6 February 1980 v England
- ODI debut (cap 29): 7 June 1975 v Pakistan
- Last ODI: 17 January 1982 v West Indies

Domestic team information
- Years: Team
- 1973/74–1983/84: New South Wales

Career statistics
Competition	Test	ODI	FC	LA
Matches	25	14	127	39
Runs scored	1,622	320	8,983	1,249
Batting average	39.56	22.85	44.03	33.75
100s/50s	4/9	0/2	27/43	2/7
Top score	127	95	168	164
Balls bowled	–	–	295	–
Wickets	–	–	2	–
Bowling average	–	–	88.50	–
5 wickets in innings	–	–	0	–
10 wickets in match	–	–	0	–
Best bowling	–	–	2/28	–
Catches/stumpings	21/–	2/–	144/–	3/–
Medal record
Men's Cricket
Representing Australia
ICC Cricket World Cup
Runner-up	1975 England
- Source: CricketArchive, 19 November 2011

Richard Bede McCosker OAM (born 11 December 1946) is a former Australian cricketer. He was a part of the Australian squad which finished as runners-up at the 1975 Cricket World Cup.

McCosker played in 25 Test matches and 14 One Day Internationals in a career spanning 1975 to 1982, playing as a right hand batsman.

He is well remembered for playing in the 1977 Centenary Test at the Melbourne Cricket Ground after he had his jaw broken by a bouncer off Bob Willis in the 1st innings. In the second innings he batted at number ten in bandages with his jaw wired shut, making 25, and sharing a 54 run partnership for the ninth wicket in with Rod Marsh. This was a crucial contribution in a tight match which Australia won by 45 runs.

He also played in the World Series Cricket team, and was a Wisden Cricketer of the Year in 1976.

He is depicted by Aidan March in the Channel 9 series Howzat! Kerry Packer's War.

== Career ==
McCosker was born in Inverell. He moved to Sydney aged 21 to work in a bank. It took him six years to graduate from grade cricket to the NSW side.

He was selected as 12th man for NSW in 1973-74

He scored a century in his debut first class game.

=== Test Debut ===
McCosker started the 1974-75 season brilliantly scoring 682 runs. He was picked in the Australian side for the fourth test against England replacing Wally Edwards. He scored 80 in the first innings, but was injured and did not bat in the second.

In the fifth test he made 35 and 11. In the 6th he scored 0 and 76.

He was picked in the squad to tour England to play the World Cup and a four-test series.

=== 1975 Ashes ===
In the World Cup, McCosker scored 73 against Sri Lanka. 0 against the West Indies, 15 against England in the semi-final and 7 in the final.

McCosker's scores in the first three tests of the 1975 ashes were 59, 29 and 79, and 0 and 95 not out. He was 95 not out with one day to play the test was abandoned due to the pitch being vandalised.

In the fourth test however he managed to score 127, his debut test century.

=== 1975-76 Season ===
At the beginning of the 1975–76 season McCosker was appointed captain of NSW when Doug Walters was injured.

McCosker scored 1 and 2 in the first test against the West Indies. He followed this with 0 and 13 and 4 and 22. McCosker was dropped in favour of Graham Yallop. "I am sure Rick is good enough to fight his way back into the team", said Greg Chappell. "He'll appreciate the break after 12 months of high-pressure international cricket".

However he was back in the team for the 6th test making 21 and 109.

He made 0 in a one-day international against the West Indies.

=== 1976-77 Season ===
Against Pakistan, McCosker made 65 and 42, 0 and 105, and 8 and 8.

In New Zealand he made 37 and 77 not out in the first test and 84 in the second.

=== Centenary Test ===
In the first innings he hooked a ball for four, then broke his jaw off a Bob Willis bouncer when he got out. In the second innings Australia were in a strong-ish position but McCosker went out to bat with a broken jaw. He scored 25 putting on 54 with Rod Marsh in a tenth wicket stand. The runs would prove crucial when Australia won by 45 runs.

"One of the Indians would have done that," said McCosker later. "One of the Englishmen would have done that. Randall in his innings, he got sconed by Lillee. He just got up and continued to bat. So you just do it... If you get kicked off a horse, you get back on again. Also because it was such a big match and such a big crowd, I wanted to be a part of it. And do something. Not just sit in the dressing room. Anyway, the guys would have been pretty sick of the sight of me in the change room. It was pretty ugly."

=== 1977 Ashes ===
McCosker toured England in 1977. His jaw had to be rewired.

During the tour it came out that he had signed to play World Series Cricket.

In the first test he scored 23 and 1, 2 and 0, 51 and 107, 27 and 12 and 32.

=== World Series Cricket ===
McCosker played two series of World Series Cricket. This included going on the 1978 tour of the West Indies, replacing Ian Davis. On that tour he broke a finger but recovered to score 95 in a one-day international.

McCosker later said he enjoyed World Series Cricket. "I played a standard of cricket that I don't think I would have played otherwise", he said. "It was such a strenuous program of cricket at such a high standard over a long period of time. It was professional ... I like the ideals of amateurism, but that doesn't pay the bills and provide you with a future.. Probably the worst thing was being barred from playing Sheffield Shield cricket".

=== Post World Series Cricket 1979-80 ===
McCosker was appointed NSW captain at the start of the 1979–80 season.

He was recalled to the Australian test side for the first Test against the West Indies and in the one day team. He made 1 in an ODI and 14 and 33 in the test. He was dropped but scored 123 against WA in a Shield game and another century against Tasmania.

McCosker was recalled to the test side when Bruce Laird was injured for the second test against England. He made 1 and 41.

He was kept on for the third test and made 33 and two. It was McCosker's last Test for Australia.

In one day games he made one, 44 and 95 against the West Indies.

McCosker announced himself unavailable for the 1980 tour of Pakistan. He was overlooked for the 1980 tour of England, even though pundits had thought he would be selected.

=== 1980-81 ===
McCosker was kept as NSW captain for the 1980–81 season. He played well for NSW, taking part in a 319 run partnership with John Dyson against WA, and thought he was an "outside chance" of making the test team. It did not happen - McCosker was overlooked for selection on the 1981 tour of England as well.

=== 1981-82: International Recall ===
McCosker was appointed captain of NSW for 1981-82 initially just for one game. By this stage he was living and working in Newcastle. McCosker ended up captaining NSW for the whole season.

McCosker had a strong season, scoring five centuries by December including a century in each innings against Victoria.

McCosker was back in the Australian one day team in 1981–82, replacing an injured Graeme Wood. He scored 20 against the West Indies, 13 against Pakistan, and 18 against the West Indies.

=== 1982-83 ===
McCosker was unsure whether to keep playing. "I've got to look at the business scene and the home front before I tell the selectors I'm available to play and perhaps take on the leadership again," he said in June 1983. "Leadership is a demanding task and the amount of time spent away from home and business at this time of my life can present long term problems."

He decided to play on and led NSW to the Sheffield Shield in 1982–83, the first time they had won that trophy in a number of years.

=== 1983-84 ===
In June 1983 Dirk Wellham was appointed captain of NSW. McCosker played on, occasionally captaining NSW. He retired from first class cricket at the end of the season. In June 1984 he was awarded the Medal of the Order of Australia.

=== After Cricket career ===
While still playing, McCosker started a business in financial planning and insurance. He later worked for National Mutual.

McCosker was an Australian selector for the 1984–85 season but resigned at the end of the summer. He continued playing grade cricket with New Lambton in Newcastle. He retired in 1988.

"I found that I had to push myself a bit at cricket just to keep playing," McCosker said "I found I was not getting the same enjoyment out of it." Instead he played competitive tennis.

In mid-2012, about 18 months after retiring from his financial planning business, McCosker became Catholic chaplain to the Port of Newcastle.

"Part of my work there was to do whatever we could for the seafarers who come in off the cargo vessels," said McCosker. "We would get a couple of buses and get the seafarers and bring them into town, where they could contact their families, go shopping, and just basically get off the ship".

McCosker relinquished his role as Chaplain in 2016, but he continues to work as a volunteer at Newcastle's Mission to Seafarers.

== Personal life ==
McCosker is married with some children.
