= David Hookes =

Australian cricketer

Personal information
- Full name: David William Hookes
- Born: 3 May 1955; Mile End, Adelaide, Australia
- Died: 19 January 2004 (aged 48); Prahran, Melbourne, Australia
- Nickname: Hookesy
- Batting: Left-handed
- Role: Batsman

International information
- National side: Australia (1977–1986)
- Test debut (cap 276): 12 March 1977 v England
- Last Test: 26 December 1985 v India
- ODI debut (cap 32): 2 June 1977 v England
- Last ODI: 12 January 1986 v India

Domestic team information
- Years: Team
- 1975/76–1991/92: South Australia

Career statistics
Competition	Test	ODI	FC	LA
Matches	23	39	178	82
Runs scored	1,306	826	12,671	2,041
Batting average	34.36	24.29	43.99	27.58
100s/50s	1/8	0/5	32/65	1/11
Top score	143*	76	306*	101
Balls bowled	96	29	4,290	591
Wickets	1	1	41	15
Bowling average	41.00	28.00	58.02	33.46
5 wickets in innings	0	0	0	1
10 wickets in match	0	0	0	0
Best bowling	1/4	1/2	3/58	5/41
Catches/stumpings	12/–	11/–	167/–	37/–
- Source: Cricinfo, 19 January 2004

David William Hookes (3 May 1955 – 19 January 2004) was an Australian cricket player and coach. He played for the Australia national cricket team and domestic cricket for South Australia, later coaching Victoria. An aggressive left-handed batsman, Hookes usually batted in the middle order. His international career got off to a sensational start in the Centenary Test at Melbourne in 1977 when he hit England captain Tony Greig for five consecutive boundaries, but a combination of circumstances ensured that he never became a regular in the Australian team. He wrote in his autobiography, "I suspect history will judge me harshly as a batsman because of my modest record in 23 Tests and I can't complain about that".

For many years, he was a leading figure in Australian domestic cricket, most notably in his role as captain of South Australia (SA). Wisden called him "a first-class destroyer of second-rate bowling". Angered by Victorian captain Graham Yallop's late declaration in a Sheffield Shield match at the Adelaide Oval in October 1982, Hookes, who normally batted at number 3 or 4, promoted himself to opening batsman and proceeded to score a century from 34 balls in just 43 minutes (including 18 fours and two sixes), at the time the fastest century scored in first-class cricket. He finished his career as the highest run-scorer in Sheffield Shield history.

An outspoken man who had several brushes with the game's officials, Hookes retired at the end of the 1991–92 season and pursued his media career. He moved to Melbourne in 1995 and broadcast on Radio 3AW. His popularity among players and his reputation for strong leadership led to his appointment as coach of the Victorian team in 2002. The team enjoyed success under his tutelage. He died after being punched by a hotel bouncer outside a pub where he had been drinking with Victorian players following their victory in a match earlier in the day.

== Cricket career ==
Hookes grew up in Torrensville, South Australia. He played for the West Torrens Cricket Club and made his A-Grade debut at the age of just 15. When he came in to bat he faced Adelaide Cricket Club bowler and local Australian rules football and media personality Ken "KG" Cunningham. KG said later in a Channel 9 tribute to Hookes that after the first two balls went past the edge of the bat, he walked down the wicket and attempted to upset the youngster in his first game and "gave him a huge spray". Hookes then sent the next four balls to the fence and after the over walked up to Cunningham and said: "Listen old man, if you continue to bowl those wobbly little inswingers the next four will go over the fence and not into the fence." In later years KG became one of Hookes's close friends and on Adelaide television and radio one of his strongest supporters even after his move to Melbourne to become coach of the Victorian state team.

David Hookes made his first-class debut in 1975–76 for South Australia. A rush of form in February 1977, when he scored five centuries from six innings in 17 days, led to his selection for the Centenary Test in March, 1977, at the age of 21.

=== Test debut and WSC ===
During Australia's second innings of the match, Hookes made 56, and hit Tony Greig for five consecutive boundaries. Soon after, he signed a contract with World Series Cricket (WSC) and then toured England. Playing all five Tests, Hookes compiled 283 runs at 31.44, with scores of 85 at The Oval and 50 at Lord's.

Australian Captain Ian Chappell described World Series Cricket (WSC) as the toughest cricket he ever played (with all the best players in the world involved)

Hookes was one of the key personalities marketed by the breakaway WSC organisation. In a Supertest at the Sydney Showground in 1977, a bouncer from Andy Roberts broke his jaw, and his confidence never fully recovered from the injury. Nevertheless, he was the third-best performed Australian batsman behind Ian and Greg Chappell with 770 runs (at 38.5 average) across the Supertests played during the 1977–78 / 78-79 and was in fact the best performed Australian batsmen across the 1978–79 Supertests with 392 runs (at 56 average). His future in the Australian team following the rapprochement between WSC and official cricket seemed assured.

=== Problems post-WSC ===
However, Hookes managed just one Test and two ODIs when injury curtailed his 1979–80 season. Returned to fitness, he toured Pakistan in 1980, but made a pair in the first Test at Karachi, dismissed twice by spin bowler Iqbal Qasim. His play against slow bowling had not developed and he was vulnerable to the well-flighted delivery as his footwork was non-existent. Dropped from the Australian team, his form failed to improve in the following Australian season, and he lost his place in the South Australia team as well.

The SACA took a gamble by appointing Hookes as South Australia captain at the start of the 1981–82 season. He responded to the challenge and led the state to the Sheffield Shield. Improved confidence and form led to his reinstatement in the Australian team for the 1982–83 Ashes series, and he batted consistently for 344 runs at 49.14 average with a best score of 68 in the fourth Test at Melbourne. Continuing his good form on the following tour of Sri Lanka, Hookes scored 143 off 152 balls in the first Test between the nations.

=== Last seasons ===
Hookes's performances were more subdued during the 1983 World Cup in England. Australia played poorly in the tournament. When the team returned home, Hookes criticised the team's captain, Kim Hughes. This earned him a fine and he was dropped from the 1983–84 Test series against Pakistan. He returned for five Tests in the West Indies during the 1984 tour and passed 20 in seven of his ten innings, yet made only one half-century, 51 at Antigua in the fourth Test.

Frustrated by Hookes's failure to turn regular starts into big scores, the Australian selectors ignored him for the next 18 months. He was not selected for the 1985 tour of England, although there had been an exodus of Australian players on a rebel tour of South Africa. His last international appearances were in 1985–86, when he played two Tests against both New Zealand and India, and two ODIs in the World Series Cup. Thereafter, Australia pursued a selection policy of giving prolonged opportunities to younger players and passing over older players with inconsistent records.

=== Domestic performances ===
Despite his failure to live up to expectations at the highest level, Hookes continued to captain South Australia until 1990, when he was sensationally sacked. In October 1982, Hookes thrashed a 43-minute, 34-ball century, which in some respects is the fastest hundred in first-class history. On 7–8 March 1987, Hookes and Wayne Phillips shared an unbroken fourth wicket stand of 462 for South Australia against Tasmania, with Hookes making his highest ever score of 306 not out coming in just 385 minutes from only 314 balls faced (Phillips scored 213 not out). Hookes' innings also included 40 fours and 2 sixes. Hookes and Wicket-keeper Phillips, both left-handed batsmen, broke the previous first-class partnership record of 456 set by Victorian pair Bill Ponsford and Edgar Mayne in the 1923–24 season against Queensland at the MCG.

Hookes also formed a devastating partnership with fellow South Australian left-hander Darren Lehmann, the pair often entertaining spectators at the Adelaide Oval in Shield matches with their attacking play. In all first-class cricket, Hookes scored 12,671 runs in 178 matches at an average of 43.99.

=== Batting style ===
Hookes was an aggressive strokeplayer against fast bowling, and was known to play the hook shot effectively. However he had problems playing spin. He was known as an "eye" player – or one who relied more on his eye than on sound batting technique.

== After retirement ==
After his retirement, he became involved in the media, making appearances on television and hosting a radio programme on Melbourne radio station 3AW with fellow sportscaster Gerard Healy.

In 2002, he was selected as the new coach of the Victorian cricket team, a team he had grown up hating. He led a revival of the team, which had struggled in previous years. The team subsequently rose back to the top of the Australian domestic competition.

During August 2003, Hookes was criticised by his employers, Cricket Victoria, after his comment in reference to Helen Cohen Alon, a South African woman who had claimed Australian cricketer Shane Warne had sexually harassed her via telephone. Commenting on her as "some dopey, hairy-backed sheila who has dobbed [Warne] in across the other side of the world. If that's what she wants to do to earn some cash that's her decision. Let's find out the facts before we hang Warney on this one".

He accused the Australian selectors of bias towards players from New South Wales stating that "when they give out the baggy blue cap in New South Wales, they give you a baggy green one in a brown paper bag as well to save making two presentations."

== Personal life ==
Hookes married his childhood sweetheart and first wife Roxanne, but left her for his second wife, Robyn Gellman. They were married for 22 years. Hookes had two stepchildren. Hookes and Robyn separated in late 2003 due to Hookes's infidelities. At the time of his death he had been in a two-year relationship with Christine Padfield, then marketing coordinator at Cricket Victoria, who was present when he died.

== Death ==
On the night of 18 January 2004, Hookes went to the Beaconsfield Hotel in West St Kilda, Melbourne. The hotel's security staff continued following the party for a short distance outside the hotel. In the altercation that followed, one of the bouncers punched Hookes. He fell to the ground, hitting his head in the process, and went into cardiac arrest. He was revived by paramedics but did not regain consciousness. He was taken to Melbourne's Alfred Hospital and placed on life support. The following evening, after family and friends had said their goodbyes, Hookes was taken off life support and died soon after. Hookes was an organ donor and 10 people received transplanted organs.

A memorial service was held on Adelaide Oval on 27 January 2004, attended by all members of the Australian, South Australia and Victoria cricket teams, as well as the Premier of Victoria, Steve Bracks. Attendance was estimated at 10,000. His estranged wife, Robyn, declined to participate in his memorial service, but sat in one of the outer grandstands.

During the bouncer's trial, witnesses gave conflicting testimony of what occurred and who started the fight. The jury acquitted him.

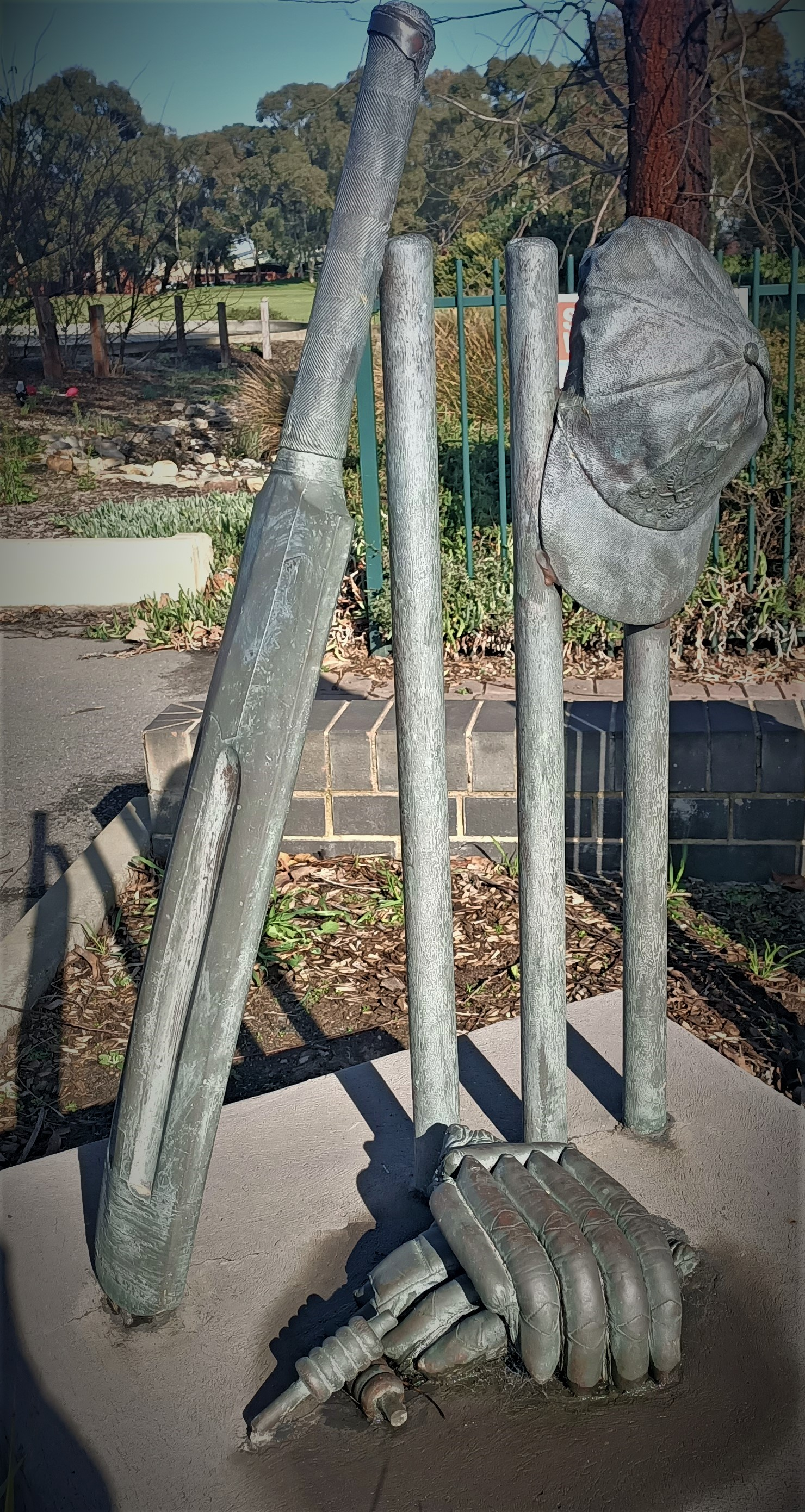
David Hookes monument in his home suburb of Torrensville near his beloved Thebarton Oval

== See also ==
- Phil Walsh
