= World Series Cricket =

Professional cricket competition from 1977 to 1979

- Administrator: Kerry Packer
- Format: Various
- First edition: 1977
- Latest edition: 1979
- Number of teams: Four: Australia XI; Cavaliers XI; Rest Of The World XI; West Indies XI
- Most runs: Greg Chappell
- Most wickets: Dennis Lillee

ABC news report of the first WSC match.

World Series Cricket (WSC) was a commercial professional cricket competition staged between 1977 and 1979 which was organised by Kerry Packer and his Australian television network, Nine Network. WSC ran in commercial competition to established international cricket. World Series Cricket drastically changed the nature of cricket, and its influence continues to be felt today.

Three main factors caused the formation of WSC — a widespread view that players were not paid sufficient amounts to make a living from cricket or reflect their market value and that following the development of colour television and increased viewer audiences of sports events, the commercial potential of cricket was not being achieved by the established cricket boards and Packer wished to secure the exclusive broadcasting rights to Australian cricket, then held by the non-commercial, government-owned Australian Broadcasting Commission (ABC), to realise and capitalise on the commercial potential of cricket.

After the Australian Cricket Board (ACB) refused to accept Channel Nine's bid to gain exclusive television rights to Australia's Test matches in 1976, Packer set up his own series by secretly signing agreements with leading Australian, English, Pakistani, South African and West Indian players, most notably England captain Tony Greig, West Indies captain Clive Lloyd, Australian captain Greg Chappell, future Pakistani captain Imran Khan and former Australian captain Ian Chappell. Packer was aided by businessmen John Cornell and Austin Robertson, both of whom were involved with the initial setup and administration of the series.

Ian Chappell summed up the quality of World Series Cricket by saying it was the toughest cricket that he ever played (having all the best players in the world involved).

== Kerry Packer and the Australian television industry ==
In the mid-1970s, the Australian television industry was at a crossroads. Since its inception in 1956, commercial television in Australia had developed a reliance on imported programs, particularly from the United States, as buying them was cheaper than commissioning Australian productions. Agitation for more Australian-made programming gained impetus from the "TV: Make it Australian" campaign in 1970. This led to a government-imposed quota system in 1973. The advent of colour transmissions in 1975 markedly improved sport as a television spectacle and, importantly, Australian sport counted as local content. However, sports administrators perceived live telecasts to have an adverse effect on attendance. The correlation between sports, corporate sponsorship, and television exposure was not evident to Australian sports administrators at the time.

After the death of his father Sir Frank in 1974, Kerry Packer had assumed control of Channel Nine, one of the many media interests owned by the family's company Consolidated Press Holdings (CPH). With Nine's ratings languishing, Packer sought to turn the network around via an aggressive strategy that included more sports programming. Firstly, he secured the rights to the Australian Open golf tournament. He spent millions of dollars revamping The Australian Golf Club in Sydney as a permanent home for the tournament. Jack Nicklaus was hired to redesign the course and to appear in the tournament. Packer was a fan of cricket, which was undergoing a resurgence in popularity during the mid-1970s. In 1976, Packer sought the rights to televise Australia's home Test matches, the contract for which was about to expire. He approached the ACB with an offer of A$1.5 million for three years (eight times the previous contract), yet he was rebuffed. The ACB felt loyal to the ABC, which had broadcast the game for twenty years when the commercial networks showed little interest in the game. Packer believed that there was an "old-boy network" element to the decision, and he was furious at the dismissive way that his bid was handled. The government-funded ABC could not hope to match a commercial network's bid, but they were awarded another three-year contract worth only $210,000, commencing with the 1976–77 season.

Determined to get some cricket on Channel Nine, Packer put an offer to the Test and County Cricket Board (TCCB) to telecast the Australian tour of England scheduled for 1977. His interest was further stimulated by a proposal to play some televised exhibition matches, an idea presented to him by Western Australian businessmen John Cornell and Austin Robertson. Robertson managed several high-profile Australian cricketers such as Dennis Lillee, while Cornell was Paul Hogan's business manager and on-screen sidekick.

Packer took this idea, then fleshed it out into a full series between the best Australian players and a team from the rest of the world. His mistrust of cricket's administrators deepened when the ACB recommended the TCCB accept an offer for their broadcasts rights from the ABC, even though ABC's $210,000 offer was only 14% of the offer from Packer. For the first time, the game's officialdom had a demonstration of Packer's wherewithal: he immediately doubled his original offer and won the contract. But he never forgot the machinations involved in winning the bid.

== Secret signings ==
Packer's planning of the proposed "exhibition" series was audacious. In early 1977, he began contracting a list of Australian players provided by recently retired Australian Test captain Ian Chappell. A bigger coup was achieved when Packer convinced the England captain Tony Greig to not only sign on, but to act as an agent in signing many players around the world. By the time the season climaxed with the Centenary Test match between Australia and England at the Melbourne Cricket Ground in March 1977, about two dozen players had committed to Packer's enterprise, which as yet had no grounds to play on, no administration and was secret to all in the cricket world. It was a measure of the players' dissatisfaction with official cricket that they were prepared to sign up for what was still a vague concept and yet keep everything covert.

By the time the Australian team arrived to tour England in May 1977, thirteen of the seventeen members of the squad had committed to Packer. News of the WSC plans were inadvertently leaked to Australian journalists, who broke the story on 9 May. Immediately, all hell broke loose in the hitherto conservative world of cricket. Not unexpectedly, the English were critical of what they quickly dubbed the "Packer Circus" and reserved particular vitriol for the English captain Tony Greig, for his central role in organising the break-away. Greig retained his position in the team, but was stripped of the captaincy and ostracised by everyone in the cricket establishment, most of whom had been singing his praises just weeks before.

It seemed certain that all Packer players would be banned from Test and first-class cricket. The Australian players were a divided group and the management made their displeasure clear to the Packer signees. Dispirited by this turn of events and hampered by poor form and indifferent weather, Australia crashed to a 3–0 defeat, surrendering the Ashes won two years before. In light of the controversies the Sydney Gazette article clearly showed West Indian captain Clive Lloyd interviewed after leaving the Caribbean team to join Packer, Lloyd stated it was nothing personal it was clearly earning a more comfortable source of income. That interview created waves across the Caribbean and even in world cricket. It was then realised that the sport had been transformed into one's livelihood.

== Court case ==
Kerry Packer, who was largely unknown in England, arrived in London in late May 1977. He appeared on David Frost's The Frost Programme to debate his concept with commentators Jim Laker and Robin Marlar. Marlar's aggressive, indignant interrogation of Packer came unstuck when Packer proved to be articulate, witty, and confident that his vision was the way of the future. The show significantly raised Packer's profile and converted some to his way of thinking. The main goal of his trip was to meet the game's authorities and reach some type of compromise. He made a canny move by securing Richie Benaud as a consultant. Benaud's standing in the game and his journalistic background helped steer Packer through the politics of the game.

Cricket's world governing body, the International Cricket Conference (ICC), now entered a controversy initially perceived as an Australian domestic problem. They met with Packer, Benaud and two assistants at Lord's on 23 June to discuss the WSC plans. After ninety minutes of compromise from both sides had almost created common ground, Packer demanded that the ICC award him the exclusive Australian television rights after the 1978–79 season ended. It wasn't in the power of the ICC to do so and Packer stormed from the meeting to deliver the following unadulterated declaration of war:

Had I got those TV rights I was prepared to withdraw from the scene and leave the running of cricket to the board.
I will take no steps now to help anyone. It's every man for himself and the devil take the hindmost.

This outburst undid any goodwill that Packer had created during his earlier television appearance, and alarmed his contracted players, who had viewed his scheme as being as much philanthropic as commercial. The ICC decided to treat Packer's scheme with contempt when a month later they decided Packer's matches would not be given first-class status and the players involved would be banned from Test matches and first-class cricket.

A number of the signed players now considered withdrawing. Jeff Thomson and Alvin Kallicharan had their contracts torn up when it was discovered that they had binding agreements with a radio station in Brisbane requiring them to play for Queensland. Packer moved quickly to shore up support, meeting with the players and taking legal action to prevent third parties from inducing players to break their contracts. To clarify the legal implications (including the proposed bans), Packer backed a challenge to the TCCB in the High Court by three of his players: Tony Greig, Mike Procter and John Snow.

The case began on 26 September 1977 and lasted seven weeks. The cricket authority's counsel said that if the top players deserted traditional cricket then gate receipts would decline. Mr. Packer's lawyers stated that the ICC had tried to force the Packer players to break their contracts and to prevent others from joining them. Mr Justice Christopher Slade considered the following nine points:

1. Are the contracts between WSC and its players void?
2. Has WSC established that, as at 3 August, and subject to any statutory immunity conferred by the 1974 Act, it was a good cause of action in tort against the ICC based on inducement of breach of contract?
3. Has WSC established that as at 3 August and subject as aforesaid, it had a good cause of action in tort against the TCCB based on the same grounds?
4. Subject to the provisions of the 1974 Act, are the new ICC rules void as being in restraint of trade?
5. Subject to aforesaid, are the proposed new TCCB rules void as being in restraint of trade?
6. Is the ICC an employers' association within the 1974 Act?
7. Is the TCCB an employers' association?
8. If either the ICC or TCCB or both be employers' associations, does this itself bar any cause of action that would otherwise exist?
9. In the light of the answers, what relief (if any) should be given to (a) the individual plaintiffs and (b) WSC?

Justice Slade in his judgement said that professional cricketers need to make a living and the ICC should not stand in their way just because its own interests might be damaged. He said the ICC might have stretched the concept of loyalty too far. Players could not be criticised for entering the contracts in secrecy as the main authorities would deny the players the opportunity to enjoy the advantages offered by WSC.

The decision was a blow to the cricket authorities and, adding insult to injury, they had to pay court costs. English County cricket teams were pleased as their players who had signed to play for Packer were still eligible to play for them.

== "Supertests", the West Indies and drop-in pitches ==
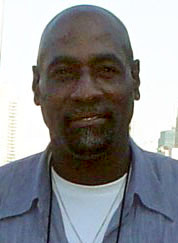
Viv Richards, the West Indian who was the second most successful batsman in WSC.

Official cricket won a series of minor victories – Packer was unable to use the terms "Test match" or call their team of Australians "Australia", or use the official rules of cricket, which are the copyright of the Marylebone Cricket Club.

So the five-day matches became "Supertests", played by the "WSC Australian XI" and Richie Benaud set to work writing rules and playing conditions for the series. Most importantly, WSC was shut out of traditional cricket venues, so Packer leased two Australian rules football stadiums (VFL Park in Melbourne and SANFL Park in Adelaide), as well as Gloucester Park (a trotting track) in Perth, and Moore Park Showground in Sydney.

The obvious problem was preparing grass pitches of suitable standard at these venues, where none had existed previously. By common consensus, it was considered impossible to create the pitches in such a short time. However, Packer hired curator John Maley, who pioneered the concept of "drop-in" pitches. These pitches were grown in hothouses outside the venue, then dropped into the playing surface with cranes. This revolutionary technique was the unsung highlight of the first season of WSC – without them, WSC would have been a folly.

Another unexpected element of the series was the emergence of a West Indian side. The concept was originally envisaged as Australia versus Rest of the World. When the West Indians were offered contracts that would pay them more than they could earn in an entire career, they all signed with alacrity. However, WSC used the West Indian players in the Rest of the World team as well.

The first WSC game, a "Supertest" between the Australians and the West Indians began at VFL Park on 2 December 1977. The standard of the cricket was excellent, but the crowds were poor, which was emphasised by the stadium's capacity of 79,000. The official Test match played in Brisbane at the same time, featuring the weakened Australian team and India, attracted far more spectators.

== First season: 1977–78 ==
Employing personality-based marketing, WSC placed great emphasis on the "gladiatorial" aspect of fast bowling and heavily promoted fast bowlers such as Dennis Lillee, Imran Khan, Michael Holding and Andy Roberts. Packer was doubtful of the effectiveness of slow bowling. To counteract the continual rotation of pace bowlers on pitches of unproven quality, WSC batsmen felt the need to increase their bodily protection. In the Sydney Supertest on 16 December, Australian David Hookes was hit a sickening blow from a bouncer bowled by West Indian Andy Roberts. Paradoxically, the effect of Hookes' broken jaw, captured graphically by Nine's cameras, served to "legitimise" the WSC matches:

... he had his jaw shattered by a bouncer from Andy Roberts ... Until that moment, WSC had looked suspiciously like a thrown-together entertainment package; Hookes' injury impressed the contest's intensity on all observers.

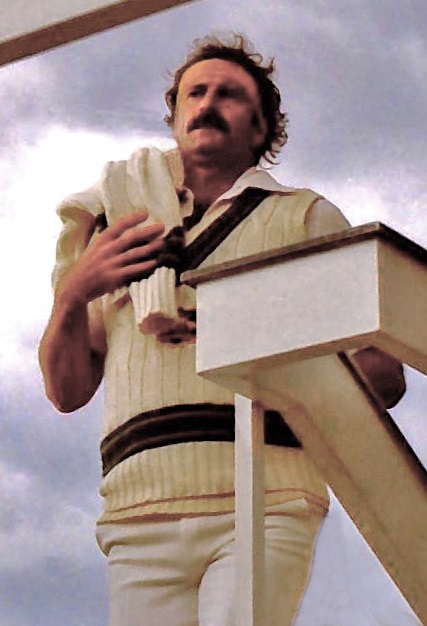
Dennis Lillee, one of WSC's star personalities who later claimed that WSC was originally his idea.

This incident had another effect: the first helmets appeared on batsmen's heads. Initially, Englishman Dennis Amiss sported a motorcycle helmet when batting in WSC, and he was quickly followed by many other players. Protective cricket equipment developed rapidly, and by the end of WSC, virtually all batsmen in WSC and official Test matches were sporting some form of protective headwear.

WSC decided to place a greater emphasis on one-day cricket than it had previously been given in Australia. A one-day series, the "International Cup" featuring the Australian, West Indian, and World teams, was played alongside six Supertests in Sydney, Melbourne, Adelaide, and Perth. The first day/night match, played at Melbourne's VFL Park, attracted some curiosity value, but generally, the paying public were indifferent to the series. Many took a lead from the hostile press, and official cricket benefited from a dramatic Test series played between Australia and a touring Indian team. The ACB's masterstroke was the appointment of the 41-year-old Bob Simpson as Australian captain, after a ten-year retirement from first-class cricket. He led a team of relatively unknown youngsters (with the exception of fast bowler Jeff Thomson, who did not sign up for the WSC) to a 3–2 series victory which was not decided until the final Test in Adelaide. Big crowds attended the Tests, and the media coverage was very supportive of the ACB throughout the summer.

By contrast, Packer was seen disconsolately counting cars as they arrived in the car park at some of his matches. He held one glimmer of hope, however. The best-attended matches had been the day-night fixtures, and this format would become the backbone of the programming for the second season. In hindsight, his organisation's ability to even stage the games at such short notice was a triumph and excellent fine-tuning for what was to come. So far, the ACB had enjoyed the backing of the press and the true aficionados of the game. But a series of misfortunes and poor decisions came to plague the ACB in their battle to stay ahead of Packer.

The official Australian team toured the Caribbean under Bob Simpson in March 1978. The West Indies cricket officials had no wish to buy into the ACB-Packer fight and decided to select all of their WSC players for the first two Tests, until the West Indies Cricket Board of Control made a decision to leave out three of their WSC-contracted players for the 3rd Test, ostensibly to allow others a chance to play in Test matches prior to the West Indies' tour to India and Sri Lanka later in the year, which would be at a time that World Series Cricket could not guarantee the availability of their West Indian players. The non-selection of these three players led to the resignation of Clive Lloyd as captain, and all of the WSC contracted West Indian players to declare themselves unavailable for the rest of the series.

== Uniforms ==
WSC Australia
Australia kit

WSC Cavaliers
Cavaliers kit

WSC Rest Of The World
Rest Of The World kit

WSC West Indies
West Indies kit

== The united front weakens ==
Between the two WSC seasons, the united front presented by the ICC countries began to erode. The highest ill-feeling toward Packer existed in England, but many officials of the county clubs were prepared to keep Packer players on their books.

The West Indies were the most financially vulnerable, and only voted for the original ICC in the interests of unity. The financial and political problems of the recent Australian tour led them to begin negotiations with Packer for a WSC series in the Caribbean during the spring of 1979. Initially, Pakistan took a hard line and refused to select their Packer players, but when WSC signed additional Pakistanis during the off-season, and when an under-strength official Pakistan team were easily beaten by England in the three-Test series in the English summer of 1978, they took a more pragmatic approach, so when it came time in October 1978 for the first Test series between Pakistan and India for seventeen years, all the Packer players were included. Ostensibly, India were not involved as yet, but rumours abounded that their captain Bishan Bedi and star batsman Sunil Gavaskar had signed WSC options.

New Zealand's chief administrator, Walter Hadlee, had advocated a compromise from the start. Now he had no objection to WSC making a brief tour of his country in November, nor was he going to stop the Kiwis' best player, his son Richard, from appearing with WSC. The South Africans, subject to an international boycott caused by the apartheid policy of their government, were keen to see their individual cricketers compete with the world's best. Some were prepared to acclaim South Africa as the best side of the world on the basis of the performances of some of their players (LeRoux and Proctor best bowling averages, Barry Richards best batting average) in WSC.

Meanwhile, WSC continued to up the stakes for the embattled ACB, optioning a number of young Australians and signing more overseas players: they now had well over 50 cricketers under contract. After organising the tours of New Zealand and the West Indies, WSC began making noises about a tour to England and signing enough players for stand-alone England and Pakistan teams.

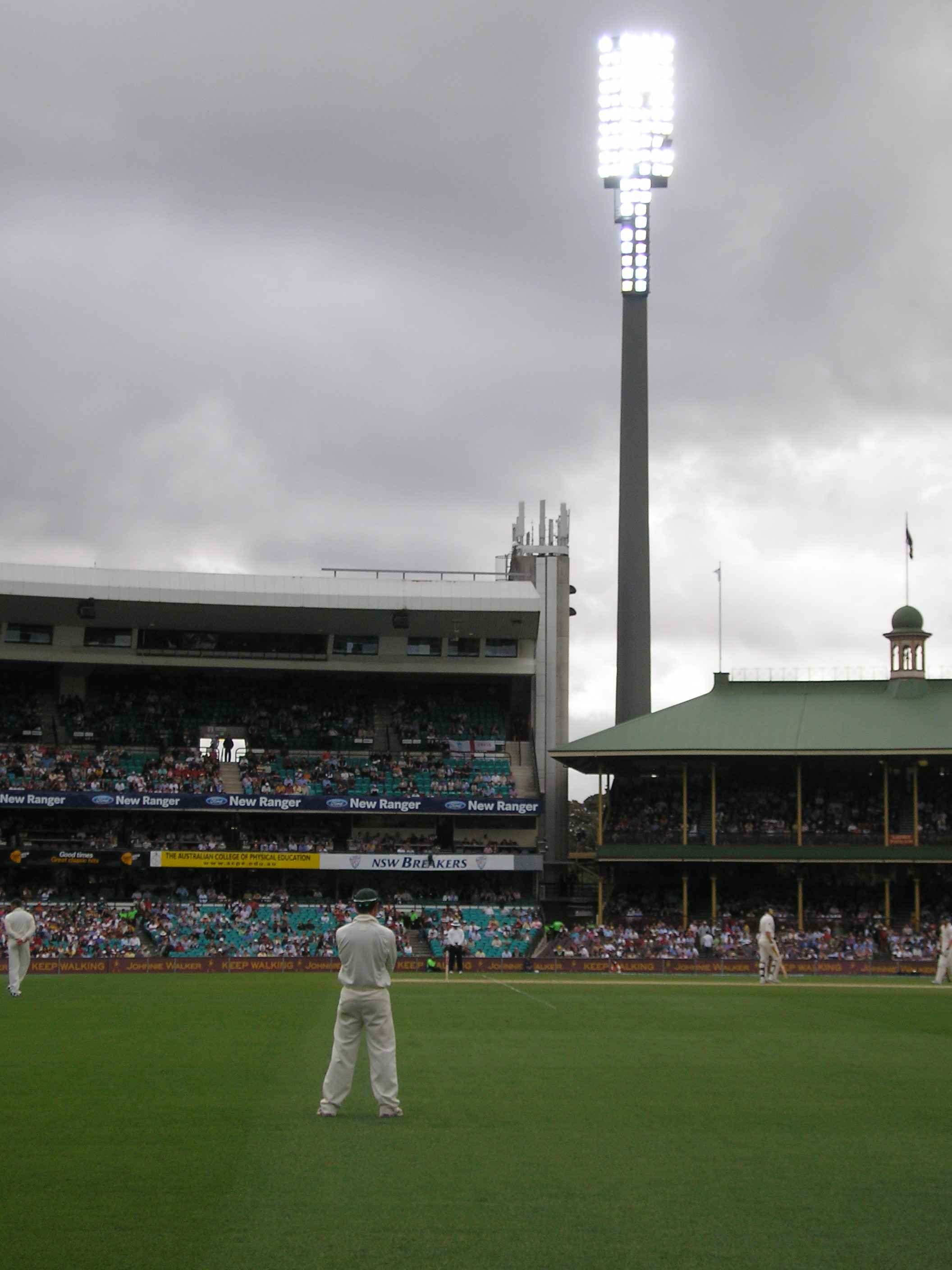
The NSW government paid for the installation of lights at the SCG in time for WSC's second season, 1978–79.

A second-tier tour was created for the 1978–79 season, taking the game to provincial centres around Australia and giving back-up players an opportunity to play regularly. This tour covered a 20,000-kilometre route between Cairns in Queensland to Devonport in Tasmania. WSC created the "Cavaliers" for this secondary tour, a similar concept to the "International Cavaliers" teams of the 1960s in England. The team captained by Eddie Barlow was made of recently retired cricketers, such as Rohan Kanhai, David Holford and Ian Redpath and occasionally young Australians such as Trevor Chappell. It also starred a great innings at Maitland, New South Wales, by a then unheard of Kepler Wessels of 92 not out for the Cavaliers. These matches brought cricket to venues that rarely saw big games.

Packer demonstrated his political clout by getting New South Wales premier Neville Wran to overturn the ban on WSC and allow matches to be played at the traditional home of the game, the Sydney Cricket Ground (SCG). To boot, Wran had his government foot the bill to install floodlights at the SCG good enough to be used in WSC matches. WSC also gained access to Brisbane's Test ground, Brisbane Cricket Ground, and were offered use of the Adelaide Oval, which was rejected. Perth and Adelaide were dropped from the itinerary. A strategy of focusing on audiences in Melbourne and Sydney was now in place.

== Second season: 1978–79 ==
The war swung dramatically in Packer's favour on 28 November 1978 when the first day-night match on a traditional cricket ground was played at the SCG between the WSC Australian and West Indian teams. A near-capacity crowd of 44,374 turned out to watch the limited overs contest, serving a warning to the ACB. A few days later, the official Australian team was humbled in the first Test against England at Brisbane, a precursor to a 5–1 thrashing for a side now captained by the unprepared Graham Yallop. Even Yallop felt himself unsuited to the position, and his team was unable to compete with an experienced, and a more professional England side. Although the Englishmen merely defeated the opposition presented, they further damaged the ACB's cause by playing slow, grinding cricket. Consequently, attendances were poor and the media clamoured for the Australian team to return to full strength.

On the other hand, WSC, with its aggressive marketing, nighttime play, and a plethora of one-day matches, had increased both attendances and television ratings. The targeted audience of women and children flocked to WSC, and the playing standard remained high.

The Supertest final at the SCG between Australia XI and Rest Of The World XI, played under lights, drew almost 40,000 spectators over three days. The sixth Australia-England Test at the same venue a week later was attended by just 22,000 people for four days of play. Later in the season, the ACB scheduled two Tests against Pakistan, which brought the number of Tests played by Australia to eight. This overkill further damaged the ACB's finances. The Pakistanis played their WSC men in what turned out to be an ill-tempered series.

WSC then headed to the Caribbean for a tense, hard-fought series that players from both Australia and West Indies declared the best they ever played in. A riot marred the Guyana Supertest, but the five Supertests and 12 one-day matches went some way toward reducing the debts of the West Indies board. The last cricket action of WSC occurred on 10 April 1979, the final day of a drawn Supertest at Antigua. The West Indies and Australia finished the series 1–1.

== The rapprochement ==
By 1979, the ACB was in desperate financial straits and faced the prospect of fighting an opponent who had seemingly endless cash resources. In two seasons, the combined losses of the two biggest cricket associations, New South Wales and Victoria, totalled more than half a million dollars. Kerry Packer was also feeling the financial pinch – many years later, WSC insiders claimed that the losses he incurred were very much higher than the amounts quoted at the time. During March of that year, Packer instigated a series of meetings with then chairman of the ACB board, Bob Parish, which hammered out an agreement on the future of Australian cricket.

When Parish announced the truce on 30 May 1979, a surprise was in store for followers of the game. Not only had Channel Nine won the exclusive rights to telecast Australian cricket, it was granted a ten-year contract to promote and market the game through a new company, PBL Marketing. The ACB capitulation infuriated the English authorities and the ICC as they had provided much in the way of financial and moral support to the ACB, which now appeared to have sold out to Packer. According to the 1980 issue of Wisden:

The feeling in many quarters was that when the Australian Board first found Packer at their throats, the rest of the cricket world supported them to the hilt; even to the extent of highly expensive court cases which cricket could ill afford. Now, when it suited Australia, they had brushed their friends aside to meet their own ends.

The WSC Australian players (on tour in West Indies at the time) had no input into the negotiations. This left some disillusioned and apprehensive that they would suffer discrimination from the ACB in the coming years. The ACB opted to not select WSC-contracted players for the tours of England (for the 1979 World Cup) and India (for six Tests) later in the year. Both tours produced sub-standard Australian performances, and both were led by Kim Hughes.

For the 1979–80 season, Greg Chappell was restored as Australian captain and the team contained an even mixture of WSC and non-WSC players. The season's schedule was similar to the WSC format. England and West Indies toured, playing three Tests each against Australia, with a triangular one-day tournament (the World Series Cup) interspersed among the Tests. Australia's results were mixed: in the Test matches, they defeated England 3–0 (having lost 5–1 to the same opponents the previous summer) but lost 0–2 to West Indies, and they failed to make the final of the one-day tournament. The format of the season received heavy criticism, but still made a healthy profit, much of which went to PBL rather than the ACB.

== Legacy ==
World Series Cricket changed the game in many ways. Due to the punishing schedule, cricketers had to be fitter than ever before.

Night matches have become very common, in all forms of the game, with the recent innovation of the Day-night test proving popular. Players became full-time professionals, and at least in the larger cricketing nations are very well-paid, mainly through television rights; broadcasters now have a huge say in the running of the game. With the advent of Twenty20 cricket, players can now play in many domestic leagues around the world and attract high salaries, partly due to broadcast rights. The Indian Premier League only trails the NFL in terms of per-match value of broadcast rights, sitting at US$15.1 million per match, for a deal worth US$6 billion running from 2023 to 2027.

Examples of World Series Cricket marketing. The popular "C'mon Aussie C'mon" single and a World Series Cricket autograph book

However, the traditional form of the game, first-class cricket and Test matches, is still played around the world, and in recent seasons has challenged one-day cricket for the interest of the public. Indeed, membership of a Test Cricket side is often seen as being more prestigious for players, due both to the more challenging nature of the format and to the higher turnover rate of one-day players. Kerry Packer described his involvement in World Series Cricket as "half-philanthropic".

Marketing was a major tool for World Series Cricket, and revolutionised the way cricket in Australia was marketed, with the catchy "C'mon Aussie C'mon" theme song, the simple logo, the coloured clothing worn by the players, and a range of merchandise. All of these techniques pioneered by World Series Cricket have become a staple of the way the game is now marketed in Australia.

In the Australian team, there was a division between the players who stayed loyal to the official XI and the Packer rebels, especially between players such as Dennis Lillee, Rod Marsh, former WSC players, and Kim Hughes who stuck with the official side. The division went on into the 1980s. Many of WSC's players fitted back into the official Australian side, though a handful of players from outside WSC remained at the highest level, most notably Allan Border.

The ACB continued to use the name "World Series Cup" to describe the One Day International tournament it held during each summer, usually involving Australia and two other international teams. This format was from WSC's International Cup. The name was used until the mid-1990s.

Coloured dress, protective helmets, field restrictions, and cricket under lights became a standard part of the post-Packer game. Crucially, Packer drove home the lesson that cricket was a marketable game, which could generate huge revenues.

Austin Robertson when he was promoting his book Cricket Outlaws stated how much the directors were paid for World Series Cricket. John Cornell – $70,000, Paul Hogan – $20,000 and Austin Robertson – $10,000.

The Nine Network continued to hold the rights to Test and international cricket in Australia until 2018, when the rights were given to the Seven Network and Foxtel. As of late 2022, Nine is again seeking the rights to international cricket, with Seven suing Cricket Australia over the quality of the Big Bash League.

== See also ==
- Cricket World Cup
- Howzat! Kerry Packer's War (2012)
- South African rebel tours
- Super League War
