= World Series Cricket squads =

Cricket squads, 1977–1979

Every player to appear in Kerry Packer's World Series Cricket is listed below along with their appearance records.
Four teams would take part in the various World Series Cricket competitions, Australia XI, Cavaliers XI, West Indies XI, World XI.

== WSC Australia XI ==
Player	D.O.B.	Role	Tests*	Supertests	WSC ODIs	Batting	Bowling	Nation
Ian Chappell (c)	26 September 1943	BAT	75	14	35	RHB	LB	Australia
Ray Bright	13 July 1954	BWL	25	15	11	RHB	SLA	Australia
Greg Chappell	7 August 1948	BAT	87	14	37	RHB	RM	Australia
Trevor Chappell	21 October 1952	ALL	3	4	10	RHB	RM	Australia
Ian Davis	25 June 1953	BAT	15	5	25	RHB	UNK	Australia
Ross Edwards	1 December 1942	BAT	20	2	9	RHB	UNK	Australia
Gary Gilmour	26 June 1951	ALL	15	7	34	LHB	LFM	Australia
David Hookes	3 May 1955	BAT	23	12	33	LHB	SLA	Australia
Martin Kent	23 November 1953	BAT	3	10	20	RHB	UNK	Australia
Bruce Laird	21 November 1950	BAT	21	13	24	RHB	UNK	Australia
Rob Langer	3 October 1948	BAT	0	2	4	LHB	RM	Australia
Dennis Lillee	18 July 1949	BWL	70	14	24	RHB	RF	Australia
Rick McCosker	11 December 1946	BAT	25	6	14	RHB	LB	Australia
Garth McKenzie	24 June 1941	BWL	60	0	1	RHB	RF	Australia
Ashley Mallett	13 July 1945	BWL	38	0	0	RHB	OB	Australia
Mick Malone	9 October 1950	BWL	1	1	29	RHB	RFM	Australia
Rod Marsh	4 November 1947	WKT	96	15	40	LHB	OB	Australia
Kerry O'Keeffe	25 November 1949	BWL	24	0	1	RHB	LB	Australia
Len Pascoe	13 February 1950	BWL	14	9	19	RHB	RF	Australia
Wayne Prior	30 September 1952	BWL	0	2	7	RHB	RF	Australia
Ian Redpath	11 May 1941	BAT	66	2	5	RHB	RM	Australia
Richie Robinson	8 June 1946	WKT	3	1	3	RHB	UNK	Australia
Jeff Thomson	16 August 1950	BWL	51	5	6	RHB	RF	Australia
Max Walker	12 September 1948	BWL	34	7	31	RHB	RFM	Australia
Doug Walters	21 December 1945	BAT	74	1	16	RHB	RM	Australia
Graeme Watson	8 March 1945	ALL	5	0	0	RHB	RM	Australia
Kepler Wessels	14 September 1957	BAT	40	4	13	LHB	RM	Australia/ South Africa
Dennis Yagmich	23 August 1948	WKT	0	0	0	RHB	UNK	Australia

== WSC West Indies XI ==
Player	D.O.B.	Role	Tests*	Supertests	WSC ODIs	Batting	Bowling	Nation
Clive Lloyd (c)	31 August 1944	BAT	110	13	31	LHB	RM	Guyana
Jim Allen	18 August 1951	BAT	0	3	20	RHB	RM	(Montserrat) Leeward Islands
Richard Austin	5 September 1954	ALL	2	4	18	RHB	RM/OB	Jamaica
Colin Croft	15 March 1953	BWL	27	7	15	RHB	RF	Guyana
Wayne Daniel	16 January 1956	BWL	10	7	28	RHB	RF	Barbados
Roy Fredericks	11 November 1942	BAT	59	10	22	LHB	LAC	Guyana
Joel Garner	16 December 1952	BWL	58	7	28	RHB	RF	Barbados
Lance Gibbs	29 September 1934	BWL	79	0	0	RHB	OB	Guyana
Gordon Greenidge	1 May 1951	BAT	108	13	31	RHB	RM	Barbados
Desmond Haynes	15 February 1956	BAT	116	4	18	RHB	RM	Barbados
Michael Holding	16 February 1954	BWL	60	9	16	RHB	RF	Jamaica
David Holford	16 April 1940	ALL	24	1	2	RHB	LB	(Trinidad and Tobago) Trinidad And Tobago
Bernard Julien	13 March 1950	ALL	24	0	25	RHB	LMF/SLA	(Trinidad and Tobago) Trinidad And Tobago
Rohan Kanhai	26 December 1935	BAT	79	0	0	RHB	RM	Guyana
Collis King	11 June 1951	BAT	9	8	34	RHB	RM	Barbados
Deryck Murray	20 May 1943	WKT	62	10	29	RHB	LB	(Trinidad and Tobago) Trinidad And Tobago
Albert Padmore	17 December 1946	BWL	2	5	11	RHB	OB	Barbados
Viv Richards	7 March 1952	BAT	121	14	33	RHB	OB	(Antigua and Barbuda) Leeward Islands
Andy Roberts	29 January 1951	BWL	47	13	30	RHB	RF	(Antigua and Barbuda) Leeward Islands
Lawrence Rowe	8 June 1949	BAT	30	9	28	RHB	LFM	Jamaica

== WSC World XI ==
Player	D.O.B.	Role	Tests*	Supertests	WSC ODIs	Batting	Bowling	Nation
Tony Greig (c)	6 October 1946	ALL	58	4	23	RHB	RFM/OB	England
Dennis Amiss	7 April 1943	BAT	50	1	16	RHB	LM	England
Asif Iqbal	6 June 1943	BAT	58	5	20	RHB	RM	Pakistan
Eddie Barlow	12 August 1940	ALL	30	1	4	RHB	RM	South Africa
Richard Hadlee	3 July 1951	ALL	86	0	7	LHB	RF	New Zealand
Imran Khan	25 November 1952	ALL	88	5	17	RHB	RF	Pakistan
Javed Miandad	12 June 1957	BAT	124	2	7	RHB	LB	Pakistan
Alan Knott	9 April 1946	WKT	95	6	28	RHB	OB	England
Garth Le Roux	4 September 1955	BWL	0	3	9	RHB	RF	South Africa
Haroon Rashid	25 March 1953	BAT	23	0	4	RHB	RM	Pakistan
Majid Khan	28 September 1946	BAT	63	2	15	RHB	OB	Pakistan
Mushtaq Mohammed	22 November 1943	ALL	57	0	2	RHB	LB	Pakistan
Mike Procter	15 September 1946	ALL	7	4	25	RHB	RF	South Africa
Clive Rice	23 July 1949	ALL	0	3	17	RHB	RFM	South Africa
Barry Richards	21 July 1945	BAT	4	5	26	RHB	OB	South Africa
Sarfraz Nawaz	1 December 1948	BWL	55	0	5	RHB	RFM	Pakistan
John Snow	13 October 1941	BWL	49	0	14	RHB	RFM	England
Taslim Arif	1 May 1954	WKT	6	0	0	RHB	RM	Pakistan
Derek Underwood	8 June 1945	BWL	86	5	20	RHB	SLA	England
Bob Woolmer	14 May 1948	ALL	19	0	12	RHB	RM	England
Zaheer Abbas	24 July 1947	BAT	78	4	14	RHB	OB	Pakistan

The following West Indians also represented WSC World XI in the 1977–78 Supertests

- Clive Lloyd (2) Guyana
- Roy Fredericks (1) Guyana
- Viv Richards (3) (Antigua and Barbuda) Leeward Islands
- Wayne Daniel (2) Barbados
- Gordon Greenidge (3) Barbados
- Andy Roberts (3) (Antigua and Barbuda) Leeward Islands
- Joel Garner (2) Barbados

The Following West Indians also represented WSC World XI in the 1978/79 on the tour of New Zealand

- Collis King (7) Barbados
- Bernard Julien (5) Trinidad and Tobago
- Albert Padmore (4) Barbados
- Lawrence Rowe (7) Jamaica
- World Series Cricket Player Records

== WSC Cavaliers XI ==
Cavaliers XI were included as a fourth team for the 1978/79 Country Cavaliers Tour. The XI was selected from players the other three sides had not selected for that rounds fixtures. This gave some of the contracted players who were not regularly appearing the chance to perform and earn bonus/prize money on offer.

Nat.	Role	Player	Apps	Nat.	Role	Player	Apps
(Australia)	BAT	Rick McCosker	19	(England)	ALL	Bob Woolmer	3
(Australia)	BAT	Ross Edwards	17	(Australia)	ALL	Gary Gilmour	1
(Australia)	BAT	Martin Kent	16	(Australia)	WKT	Richie Robinson	17
(Australia)	BAT	Doug Walters	12	(Pakistan)	WKT	Taslim Arif	3
(Australia)	BAT	Rob Langer	10	(Australia)	BWL	Kerry O'Keeffe	15
(Pakistan)	BAT	Haroon Rashid	7	(England)	BWL	John Snow	11
(England)	BAT	Dennis Amiss	6	(Australia)	BWL	Wayne Prior	8
(Cricket West Indies)	BAT	Rohan Kanhai	5	(Pakistan)	BWL	Sarfraz Nawaz	4
(Australia)	BAT	Ian Redpath	5	(Australia)	BWL	Garth McKenzie	4
(Australia) /	BAT	Kepler Wessels	2	(Australia)	BWL	Mick Malone	4
(Cricket West Indies)	BAT	Jim Allen	2	(Cricket West Indies)	BWL	Wayne Daniel	3
(Australia)	BAT	Bruce Laird	2	(Australia)	BWL	Len Pascoe	3
	ALL	Eddie Barlow (c)	19	(Cricket West Indies)	BWL	Albert Padmore	2
(Australia)	ALL	Trevor Chappell	13	(Australia)	BWL	Max Walker	2
(Cricket West Indies)	ALL	David Holford	10	(Australia)	BWL	Ian Davis	1
(Pakistan)	ALL	Mushtaq Mohammed	9	(Cricket West Indies)	BWL	Lance Gibbs	1
(Australia)	ALL	Graeme Watson	9	(Cricket West Indies)	ALL	Richard Austin	4
(Cricket West Indies)	ALL	Bernard Julien	4

== Key ==
Tests – Number of Test Matches played at the end of the player's career

Supertests – Number of World Series Cricket Supertests played

WSC ODIs – Number of World Series Cricket One Day International Matches played; International Cup ODIs (1977/78), International Cup (1978/79), WSC Tour Matches (1978/79 New Zealand), One-day games (1978/79 West Indies). Does not include Country Cup matches, Cavaliers Country Tour, Swan Channel 9 Cup, or other matches played during the WSC era.
