= List of World Series Cricket international five-wicket hauls =

World Series Cricket (WSC) was a break away professional cricket competition staged between 1977 and 1979.

Formed by Australian business man Kerry Packer following the refusal of the Australian Cricket Board (ACB) to accept the bid of Packer's Channel Nine to gain exclusive television rights to Australia's Test matches, World Series Cricket involved matches between WSC Australia XI, WSC World XI and WSC West Indies. The teams included leading Australian, English, Pakistani, South African and West Indian players, most notably England captain Tony Greig, West Indies captain Clive Lloyd, Australian captain Greg Chappell and former Australian captain Ian Chappell.

The teams played five day "Supertests" and one day "International Cup" matches in Australia and the West Indies. The first WSC game, a Supertest between the Australians and the West Indians, began at VFL Park on 2 December 1977.

Sixteen Supertest five wicket hauls were by players from all three of the WSC teams. The first of these was by Greg Chappell on 1 January 1978. Dennis Lillee's seven wickets for twenty three runs (7/23) was the best bowling figures in World Series Cricket and Lillee also holds the record for most Supertest five wicket hauls with four.

Eight International Cup five wicket hauls were taken during World Series Cricket, with Andy Roberts claiming the first on 3 February 1978. No player took more than one five wicket haul and WSC World XI player Garth Le Roux returned the best figures with five wickets for six runs, against WSC Australia XI.

== Key ==
- Date – Date the fifth wicket was taken.
- Inn – The innings of the match in which the five-wicket haul was taken.
- Overs – Number of overs bowled in that innings.
- * - Overs consisting of eight deliveries.
- Runs – Runs conceded.
- Wkts – Number of wickets taken.
- Batsmen – The batsmen whose wickets were taken in the five-wicket haul.
- Result – The result for the player's team in that match.

== Supertest five wicket hauls ==
| No. | Player | Date | For | Against | Inn | Venue | Overs | Wkts | Runs | Batsmen | Result |
|---|---|---|---|---|---|---|---|---|---|---|---|
| 1 | Greg Chappell | 1 January 1978 | Australia | West Indies | 2 | Football Park, Adelaide | 12* | 5 | 20 | RC Fredericks; CG Greenidge; LG Rowe; CL King; J Garner | Won |
| 2 | Max Walker | 16 January 1978 | Australia | World XI | 2 | RAS Showground, Sydney | 28.3* | 7 | 88 | CG Greenidge; CH Lloyd; AW Greig; IVA Richards; MJ Procter; AME Roberts; J Garner | Lost |
| 3 | Andy Roberts | 17 January 1978 | World XI | Australia | 3 | RAS Showground, Sydney | 12* | 6 | 69 | BM Laird; RS Langer; IM Chapell; GS Chappell; RW Marsh; GJ Gilmour | Won |
| 4 | Ray Bright | 28 January 1978 | Australia | World XI | 1 | Gloucester Park, Perth | 31.3* | 5 | 149 | BA Richards; Imran Khan; APE Knott; CG Greenidge; WW Daniel | Lost |
| 5 | Joel Garner | 12 February 1978 | World XI | Australia | 3 | VFL Park, Melbourne | 14.7* | 5 | 52 | IC Davis; GS Chappell; R Edwards; DW Hookes; MHN Walker | Lost |
| 6 | Dennis Lillee | 13 February 1978 | Australia | World XI | 4 | VFL Park, Melbourne | 15* | 5 | 82 | BA Richards; IVA Richards; AW Greig; Imran Khan; J Garner | Won |
| 7 | Max Walker | 13 February 1978 | Australia | World XI | 4 | VFL Park, Melbourne | 14* | 5 | 62 | CG Greenidge; Zaheer Abbas; AME Roberts; Asif Iqbal; WW Daniel | Won |
| 8 | Dennis Lillee | 5 November 1978 | Australia | World XI | 2 | Mount Smart Stadium, Auckland | 18 | 7 | 59 | BA Richards; DL Amiss; AW Greig; APE Knott; BD Julien; JA Snow; AL Padmore | Won |
| 9 | Richard Hadlee | 5 November 1978 | World XI | Australia | 3 | Mount Smart Stadium, Auckland | 15 | 5 | 26 | IC Davis; IM Chapell; DW Hookes; RB McCosker; GJ Gilmour | Lost |
| 10 | Dennis Lillee | 6 November 1978 | Australia | World XI | 4 | Mount Smart Stadium, Auckland | 14 | 5 | 30 | DL Amiss; RA Woolmer; CEB Rice; CL King; RJ Hadlee | Won |
| 11 | Garth Le Roux | 9 December 1978 | World XI | Australia | 2 | VFL Park, Melbourne | 25.5 | 5 | 39 | BM Laird; RJ Bright; DW Hookes; IM Chappell; DK Lillee | Won |
| 12 | Ray Bright | 21 January 1979 | Australia | West Indies | 1 | SCG, Sydney | 23 | 6 | 52 | CG Greenisge; IVA Richards; LG Rowe; JC Allen; DL Murray; AL Padmore | Won |
| 13 | Colin Croft | 23 January 1979 | West Indies | Australia | 2 | SCG, Sydney | 26 | 5 | 65 | KC Wessels; GS Chappell; IM Chappell; DW Hookes; RW Marsh | Lost |
| 14 | Dennis Lillee | 24 January 1979 | Australia | West Indies | 3 | SCG, Sydney | 14 | 7 | 23 | RA Austin; CG Greenidge; JC Allen; LG Rowe; IVA Richards; DL Murray; WW Daniel | Won |
| 15 | Garth Le Roux | 2 February 1979 | World XI | Australia | 1 | SCG, Sydney | 18.4 | 5 | 57 | BM Laird; IM Chppell; MF Kent; RW Marsh; LS Pascoe | Won |
| 16 | Dennis Lillee | 3 February 1979 | Australia | World XI | 2 | SCG, Sydney | 18.5 | 5 | 51 | EJ Barlow; MJ Procter; AW Greig; Imran Khan; DL Underwood | Lost |
| 17 | Michael Holding | 16 March 1979 | West Indies | Australia | 1 | Queen's Park Oval, Port of Spain | 21 | 5 | 48 | IM Chappell; GS Chappell; DW Hookes; TM Chappell; RJ Bright | Lost |
| 18 | Jeff Thomson | 18 March 1979 | Australia | West Indies | 2 | Queen's Park Oval, Port of Spain | 20 | 5 | 78 | RC Fredericks; LG Rowe; IVA Richards; CH Lloyd; MA Holding | Won |
| 19 | Dennis Lillee | 9 April 1979 | Australia | West Indies | 2 | Antigua Recreation Ground, St John's | 33.2 | 6 | 125 | DL Haynes; RC Fredericks; IVA Richards; CH Lloyd; LG Rowe; MA Holding | Won |

== International Cup five wicket hauls ==
| No. | Player | Date | For | Against | Inn | Venue | Overs | Wkts | Runs | Batsmen | Result |
|---|---|---|---|---|---|---|---|---|---|---|---|
| 1 | Andy Roberts | 3 February 1978 | West Indies | World XI | 2 | RAS Showground, Sydney | 8* | 5 | 17 | DL Amiss; RA Woolmer; Majid Khan; Asif Iqbal; BA Richards | Won |
| 2 | Wayne Daniel | 5 February 1978 | West Indies | Australia | 2 | RAS Showground, Sydney | 5.7* | 5 | 29 | IC Davis; RW Marsh; GJ Gilmour; DK Lillee; LS Pascoe | Won |
| 3 | Greg Chappell | 28 November 1978 | Australia | West Indies | 1 | Sydney Cricket Ground, Sydney | 9.3 | 5 | 19 | LG Rowe; JC Allen; BD Julien; DL Murray; J Garner | Won |
| 4 | Len Pascoe | 18 December 1978 | Australia | World XI | 2 | VFL Park, Melbourne | 10 | 5 | 30 | Zaheer Abbas; BA Richards; Javed Miandad; MJ Procter; Asif Iqbal | Won |
| 5 | Garth Le Roux | 1 January 1979 | World XI | Australia | 1 | Brisbane Cricket Ground, Brisbane | 6.1 | 5 | 6 | GS Chappell; IR Redpath; TM Chappell; MF Malone; W Prior | Won |
| 6 | Max Walker | 9 January 1979 | Australia | West Indies | 2 | VFL Park, Melbourne | 10 | 5 | 23 | JC Allen; IBD Julien; DL Murray; AME Roberts; MA Holding | Won |
| 7 | Jeff Thomson | 21 February 1979 | Australia | West Indies | 1 | Sabina Park, Kingston | 7.3 | 5 | 31 | CL King; DL Murray; MA Holding; J Garner; WW Daniel | Won |
| 8 | Colin Croft | 4 April 1979 | West Indies | Australia | 1 | Windsor Park, Roseau | 9 | 5 | 21 | BM Laird; MF Kent; IM Chappell; RJ Bright; MF Malone | Won |

== See also ==
- List of World Series Cricket international centuries
