= Cricket in Western Australia =

Cricket is one of the most popular sports in Western Australia. The governing body of the game in WA is WA Cricket. Western Australia is represented at Sheffield Shield and domestic one-day level by the Western Warriors, and in the Big Bash League by the Perth Scorchers.

== History ==
=== Early history ===
The first cricket match recorded in Western Australia was played between the builders of Government House and the commissariat store. No scores were recorded, but the Perth Gazette wrote: "the revival of the sports of our native country in a distant land forms a connection which it should be our pride to encourage." The first clubs formed were the Perth Cricket Club, the Guildford Cricket Club and the Tradesmen of Perth. Perth and the Tradesmen of Perth who played a match in May 1846. Other matches were played in the country centres of York, Bunbury, Toodyay and Beverley during the same period.

A club was formed in Fremantle in 1852, and matches between Perth and Fremantle commenced in November 1852, played on the Perth Recreation Ground on the present site of Wellington Square. The match was attended by the Governor and Colonial Secretary, with food and entertainment in the form of a band being provided. The Perth Gazette noted "the field was graced by nearly all the beauty of the metropolis". The inaugural contest was won by Perth, who defeated Fremantle by three wickets, with the player Wellman taking six wickets for Perth in the first innings. Three brothers A., C. and E. King played on the side of Perth.

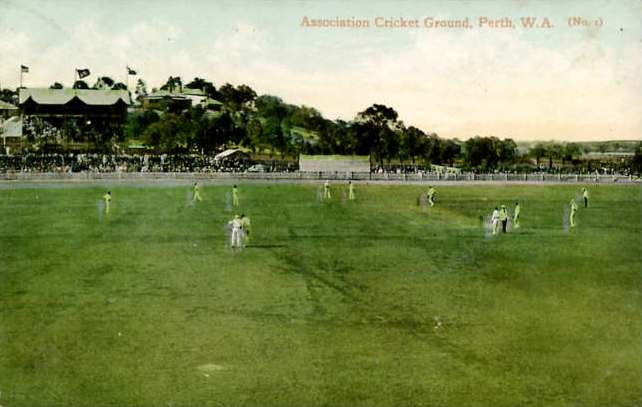
An early coloured image of the WACA Ground in about 1910, looking north, with a large crowd watching a game in progress

In 1879, a team from the Benedictine mission at New Norcia, organised by Henry Lefroy and the abbot Rosendo Salvado and mainly consisting of Aboriginals, was formed. The team played matches against teams from nearby Northam and York, and also "toured" Perth and Fremantle, winning most of their matches. Later the same year, the Metropolitan Cricket Club, formed from the amalgamation of the Perth and Perth Union Cricket Clubs, travelled to New Norcia, winning a match against the team by a narrow margin.

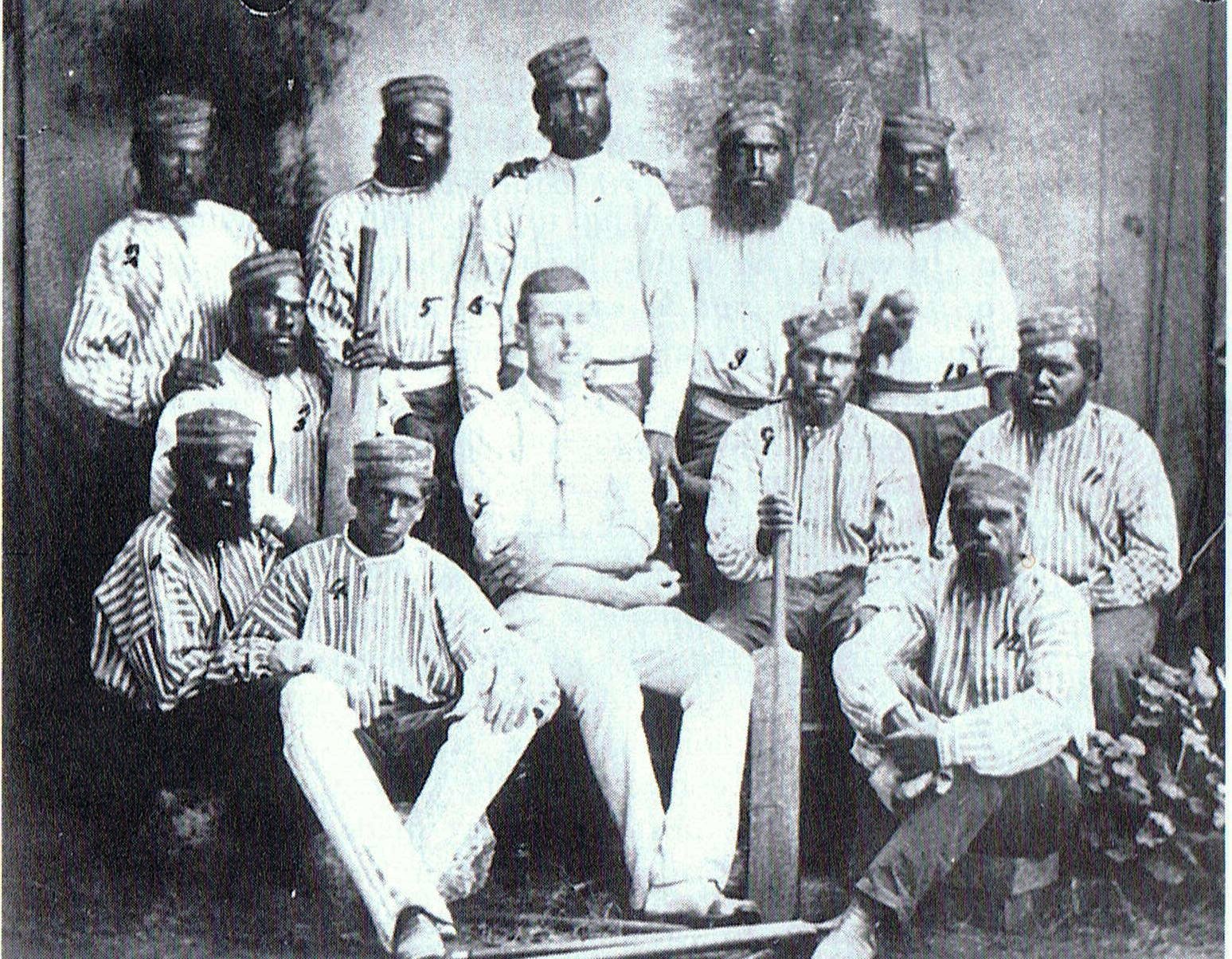
The New Norcia Cricket Team, early 1880s, captained by Henry Lefroy who would later become the 11th Premier of Western Australia

WA Cricket was formed as the Western Australian Cricket Association on 25 November 1885, with Magistrate John James named as the inaugural president of the association. In 1889, James secured a grant of 28 acres from Governor Frederick Broome on the foreshore at East Perth, with a 999-year lease. Frederic North was named as the first secretary of the association.

The Western Australia cricket team played their opening first-class matches on a tour of the Eastern states during the 1892–93 season, playing two games – against South Australia at the Adelaide Oval, losing by 10 wickets, and against Victoria at the MCG, losing by an innings and 243 runs. The team was captained by Herbert Orr.

A team organised by George Giffen toured Western Australia in 1896, playing five matches at Coolgardie, Kalgoorlie, Fremantle, Perth and Northam.

The WACA Ground was opened in November 1893, with the first curator being William Duffy, who also played two matches for Western Australia. A grandstand was built at the ground in 1895, seating approximately 500 people and incorporating dressing rooms, members' rooms and a bar. The initial first-class match played on the ground was between Western Australia and South Australia in April 1899, with South Australia winning by four wickets. Further sides visited the state before the start of World War I, with South Australia touring in 1905–06 and 1908–09, New South Wales touring in 1906–07, the MCC touring in 1907–08 and Victoria touring in 1909–10. Matches were played both at the WACA Ground and at Fremantle Oval. Western Australia managed to win two of these matches, against South Australia in January 1906, by 103 runs, and against New South Wales in March 1907, by 5 runs. The first century scored for Western Australia was by Ernie Parker, who scored 116 against South Australia in 1906.

Western Australia was invited to send a representative to the Board of Control in 1913.

The WACA recruited several well-known interstate cricketers to play for Western Australia during the early part of the 20th century, including Ernie Jones, Arthur Richardson and Ernest Bromley, who all played Test cricket for Australia.

=== Post-World War I ===
Several cricketers from Western Australia fought in World War I, including Ernie Parker, Lionel Gouly and Jim Everett.

=== Admission to the Sheffield Shield ===
Western Australia was admitted to the Sheffield Shield for the 1947–48 season. Keith Carmody was recruited from New South Wales to lead the inaugural side. Although playing a shortened schedule of matches compared to the other teams, playing each team only once instead of twice, Western Australia won the competition in the first year.

Notable cricketers from the first few years of Western Australia's Sheffield Shield competition include Carmody, Allan Edwards, Wally Langdon, Laurie Sawle, John Rutherford, Ken Meuleman, John Munro and Basil Rigg. When selected for Australia's tour of India in 1956, Rutherford became the first Western Australian selected for an overseas tour, and the first to play a Test match.

From the 1956–57 season, Western Australia played a full schedule of matches against other states. This coincided with a drop in success of the team, although several more players made their Australian debuts, including Meuleman, Ron Gaunt, Barry Shepherd, Des Hoare and Keith Slater. Bob Simpson was recruited to the state from New South Wales for the 1956–57 season, and had an immediate impact. He currently holds the Western Australian record for the highest first-class batting average, scoring 2,470 runs from 24 matches at an average of 79.67. His average for the 1959–60 season was 300.66, an Australian record.

=== "Golden Era" ===
Western Australia won seven Shield titles during the period from 1967–68 to 1980–81, which coincided with the international debuts of players such as Bruce Laird, Dennis Lillee, Rod Marsh, Bob Massie, Bruce Yardley and Kim Hughes. In 1979 Hughes became the first Western Australia to captain the national side. Several international players were recruited to Western Australia during this period, including Tony Lock from England, Wayne Daniel from Barbados and Ken McEwan from South Africa.

=== World Series Cricket ===
Gloucester Park, a trotting track in Perth, hosted seven World Series International Cup matches and one SuperTest in 1978 as part of the World Series Cricket (WSC) competition organised by Kerry Packer. The Western Australian cricketers who signed with WSC were Ross Edwards, Bruce Laird, Rob Langer, Dennis Lillee, Mick Malone, Rod Marsh and Dennis Yagmich. These cricketers were barred from playing cricket for Western Australia for the time they were signed with WSC, but most returned to state cricket after the WSC-ACB truce in 1979.

=== Recent years ===
The Perth Scorchers were formed in 2011 to represent the state in the Big Bash League for the 2011–12 season.

== Venues ==
The WACA Ground in Perth, Fremantle Oval in Fremantle, Hands Oval in Bunbury and the Perth Stadium in Burswood have hosted major matches in Western Australia. Fremantle Oval is no longer used for cricket.

Gloucester Park, a racecourse in Perth, was used for World Series Cricket matches from 1977–79.

Lilac Hill in Midland hosted the annual Lilac Hill Match from 1990–2008, and also hosted a women's one-day international match between Australia and New Zealand in 2005.

List of venues in Western Australia
Ground name	Location	First used	Last used	FC	LA	T20	Notes
WACA Ground	East Perth	1898–99	present	424	220	16	Hosted Test, ODI and Twenty20 International cricket.
Fremantle Oval	Fremantle	1905–06	1909–10	5	0	0	No longer used for cricket.
Hands Oval	Bunbury	2008–09	present	0	3	0	
Lilac Hill Park	Guildford	1990	present	0	0	0	Women's ODI
Gloucester Park	Perth	1978	1979	0	0	0	World Series Cricket
Perth Stadium	Burswood, Perth	2017-18	present	1	0	0	Main venue for first-class cricket in Perth

== Competitions ==
- Western Australian Grade Cricket

== Teams ==
- Western Warriors

Test	Home ground	First played	Last played	Status	Notes
Western Warriors	WACA Ground	1893	2023	First-class and List A	
Perth Scorchers	Perth Stadium	2011	2023	Twenty20	
Western Fury	Lilac Hill Park	1996	2014	Women's	

== See also ==
- Cricket in Australia
- Cricket in New South Wales
- Cricket in Norfolk Island
- Cricket in Queensland
- Cricket in Victoria
