= World Series Cricket World XI =

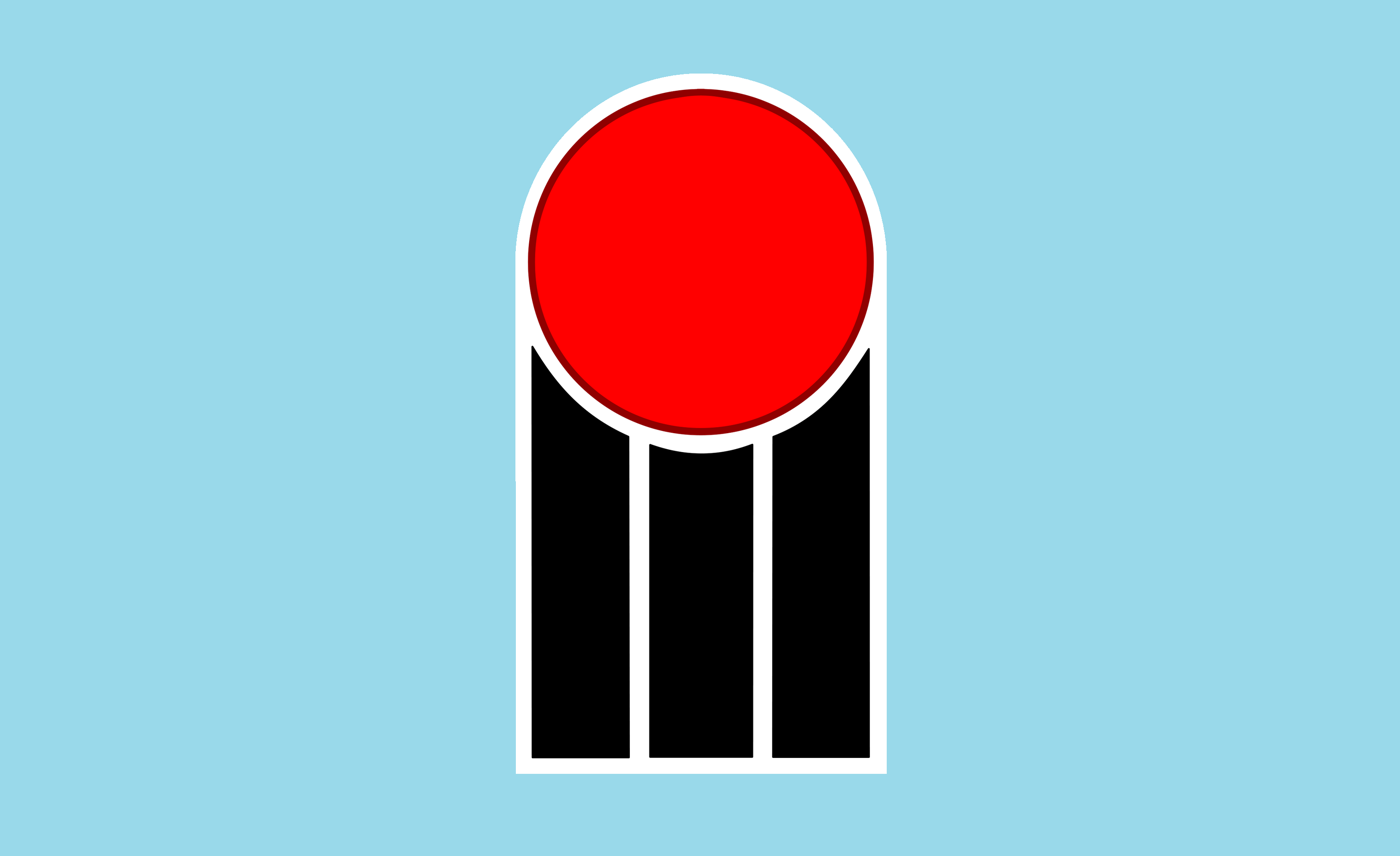

Personnel
- Captain: (England) Tony Greig

Team information
- Colours: Pale blue
- Founded: 1977
- Home ground: None
WSC Rest Of The World XI Kit

The World Series Cricket Rest Of The World XI was a cricket team representing the Rest of the World in World Series Cricket (WSC). Their first game was against the WSC Australia XI in 1978. World Series Cricket ended in 1979 after the Australia tour to West Indies. The side was captained by former England captain Tony Greig, who was assigned to recruit his teammates. Greig's former England teammates Derek Underwood, Dennis Amiss, John Snow and star wicketkeeper Alan Knott were signed along with many players from Pakistan, including national icon Imran Khan. The World XI also offered competitive international class cricket to players from South Africa, who were then barred from international cricket, such as Barry Richards, Garth Le Roux and Mike Procter.

== Players ==
No.	Player	Nationality
1	Tony Greig	England
2	Dennis Amiss	England
3	Asif Iqbal	Pakistan
4	Eddie Barlow	South Africa
5	Richard Hadlee	New Zealand
6	Imran Khan	Pakistan
7	Javed Miandad	Pakistan
8	Alan Knott	England
9	Garth Le Roux	South Africa
10	Haroon Rashid	Pakistan
11	Majid Khan	Pakistan
12	Mushtaq Mohammed	Pakistan
13	Mike Procter	South Africa
14	Clive Rice	South Africa
15	Barry Richards	South Africa
16	Sarfraz Nawaz	Pakistan
17	John Snow	England
18	Taslim Arif	Pakistan
19	Derek Underwood	England
20	Bob Woolmer	England
21	Zaheer Abbas	Pakistan

== Records ==
The following are records by players who exclusively played WSC matches for the World XI

=== Highest team total ===
Highest team total (over 350 runs only)

Supertest					One Day				
Score (Overs)	Team	Versus	Venue	Date	Score (Overs)	Team	Versus	Venue	Date
625 (114.3)	WSC Rest Of The World XI	WSC Australia XI	Gloucester Park	27–30 January 1978	248/7 (40)	WSC Rest Of The World XI	WSC West Indies XI	VFL Park	24 December 1977
471(163.3)	WSC Rest Of The World XI	WSC West Indies XI	Sydney Cricket Ground	21–23 December 1978	236/8 (39.4)	WSC Rest Of The World XI	WSC West Indies XI	Sydney Showground	22 January 1978
434 (86.1)	WSC Rest Of The World XI	WSC Australia XI	VFL Park	9–13 February 1978	204/9 (40)	WSC Rest Of The World XI	WSC Australia XI	Football Park	10 December 1977
290 (74.3)	WSC Rest Of The World XI	WSC Australia XI	Sydney Showground	14–19 January 1978	197 (49.3)	WSC Rest Of The World XI	WSC West Indies XI	Brisbane Cricket Ground	30 December 1978
257 (140)	WSC Rest Of The World XI	WSC Australia XI	VFL Park	8–11 December 1978	194/8 (50)	WSC Rest Of The World XI	WSC West Indies XI	VFL Park	16 December 1978

=== Most runs ===
- Note: Only top 5 players shown.

Supertest										One Day									
Player	Team	M	I	NO	Runs	Avg	50s	100s	HS	Player	Team	M	I	NO	Runs	Avg	50s	100s	HS
Barry Richards	WSC Rest Of The World XI	5	8	1	554	79.14	2	2	207	Barry Richards	WSC Rest Of The World XI	26	26	0	625	24.03	4	0	95
Zaheer Abbas	WSC Rest Of The World XI	4	7	0	214	30.57	1	0	91	Clive Rice	WSC Rest Of The World XI	17	16	3	377	29.00	0	0	46
Asif Iqbal	WSC Rest Of The World XI	5	8	0	209	26.12	0	1	107	Tony Greig	WSC Rest Of The World XI	23	21	1	337	16.85	2	0	62
Mike Procter	WSC Rest Of The World XI	4	7	1	182	30.33	2	0	66	Dennis Amiss	WSC Rest Of The World XI	16	16	1	312	20.80	3	0	71
Clive Rice	WSC Rest Of The World XI	3	5	0	151	30.20	1	0	83	Asif Iqbal	WSC Rest Of The World XI	20	19	2	309	18.17	2	0	59

=== Highest individual scores ===
Note: Only top five scores listed.

Supertest						One Day					
Runs	Batsman	Team	Versus	Venue	Date	Runs	Batsman	Team	Versus	Venue	Date
207	Barry Richards	WSC Rest Of The World XI	WSC Australia XI	Gloucester Park	27 January 1978	95	Barry Richards	WSC Rest Of The World XI	WSC West Indies XI	VFL Park	24 December 1977
107	Asif Iqbal	WSC Rest Of The World XI	WSC Australia XI	Sydney Cricket Ground	21 December 1978	92	Barry Richards	WSC Rest Of The World XI	WSC West Indies XI	Brisbane Cricket Ground	30 December 1978
101*	Barry Richards	WSC Rest Of The World XI	WSC Australia XI	Sydney Cricket Ground	2 February 1979	71	Dennis Amiss	WSC Rest Of The World XI	WSC Australia XI	Pukekura Park	15 November 1978
91	Zaheer Abbas	WSC Rest Of The World XI	WSC West Indies XI	Sydney Cricket Ground	21 December 1978	64	Barry Richards	WSC Rest Of The World XI	WSC Australia XI	Nelson Cricket Ground	18 November 1978
83	Clive Rice	WSC Rest Of The World XI	WSC West Indies XI	Sydney Cricket Ground	21 December 1978	63*	Dennis Amiss	WSC Rest Of The World XI	WSC Australia XI	Mount Smart Stadium	8 November 1978

=== Most wickets ===
- Note: Sorted by wickets then bowling average.

Supertest												One Day										
Player	Team	Matches	Balls	Runs	Wkts	BBI	BBM	Ave	Econ	SR	5WI	Player	Team	Matches	Balls	Runs	Wkts	BB	Ave	Econ	SR	5WI
Imran Khan	WSC Rest Of The World XI	5	999	521	25	4/24	7/103	20.84	3.12	39.9	0	Derek Underwood	WSC Rest Of The World XI	20	947	570	27	4/31	21.11	3.61	35.07	0
Garth le Roux	WSC Rest Of The World XI	3	648	270	17	5/39	9/101	15.88	2.50	38.10	2	Imran Khan	WSC Rest Of The World XI	17	797	408	22	4/40	18.54	3.07	36.22	0
Derek Underwood	WSC Rest Of The World XI	5	1,254	441	16	4/59	6/95	27.56	2.11	78.30	0	Mike Procter	WSC Rest Of The World XI	25	1,045	530	22	4/6	24.09	3.04	47.50	0
Mike Procter	WSC Rest Of The World XI	4	494	225	14	4/33	5/58	16.07	2.73	35.2	0	Richard Hadlee	WSC Rest Of The World XI	7	350	154	18	4/25	8.55	2.64	19.44	0
Clive Rice	WSC Rest Of The World XI	3	402	169	7	2/38	3/64	24.14	2.52	57.40	0	Garth le Roux	WSC Rest Of The World XI	9	379	221	17	5/6	13.00	3.49	22.29	1

=== Best bowling ===
- Note: Only top 5 figures shown.

Supertest						One Day					
Bowling figures: Wickets/Runs (Overs)	Bowler	Team	Versus	Venue	Date	Bowling figures: Wickets/Runs (Overs)	Bowler	Team	Versus	Venue	Date
5/39 (25.5)	Garth le Roux	WSC Rest Of The World XI	WSC Australia XI	VFL Park	8 December 1978	5/6 (6.1)	Garth le Roux	WSC Rest Of The World XI	WSC Australia XI	Brisbane Cricket Ground	1 January 1979
5/57 (18.4)	Garth le Roux	WSC Rest Of The World XI	WSC Australia XI	Sydney Cricket Ground	2 February 1979	4/6 (9)	Mike Procter	WSC Rest Of The World XI	WSC Australia XI	Pukekura Park	15 November 1978
4/24 (7)	Imran Khan	WSC Rest Of The World XI	WSC Australia XI	Gloucester Park	27 January 1978	4/14 (8)	Clive Rice	WSC Rest Of The World XI	WSC Australia XI	Brisbane Cricket Ground	1 January 1979
4/30 (15.2)	Imran Khan	WSC Rest Of The World XI	WSC Australia XI	VFL Park	8 December 1978	4/25 (10)	Richard Hadlee	WSC Rest Of The World XI	WSC Australia XI	Mount Smart Stadium	19 November 1978
4/33 (9.7)	Mike Procter	WSC Rest Of The World XI	WSC Australia XI	Sydney Showground	14 January 1978	4/27 (10)	Garth le Roux	WSC Rest Of The World XI	WSC West Indies XI	Brisbane Cricket Ground	30 December 1978

== See also ==
- World Series Cricket results
- World Series Cricket player records
- WSC Australia XI
- WSC Cavaliers XI
- WSC West Indies XI
