= World Series Cricket Australia XI =

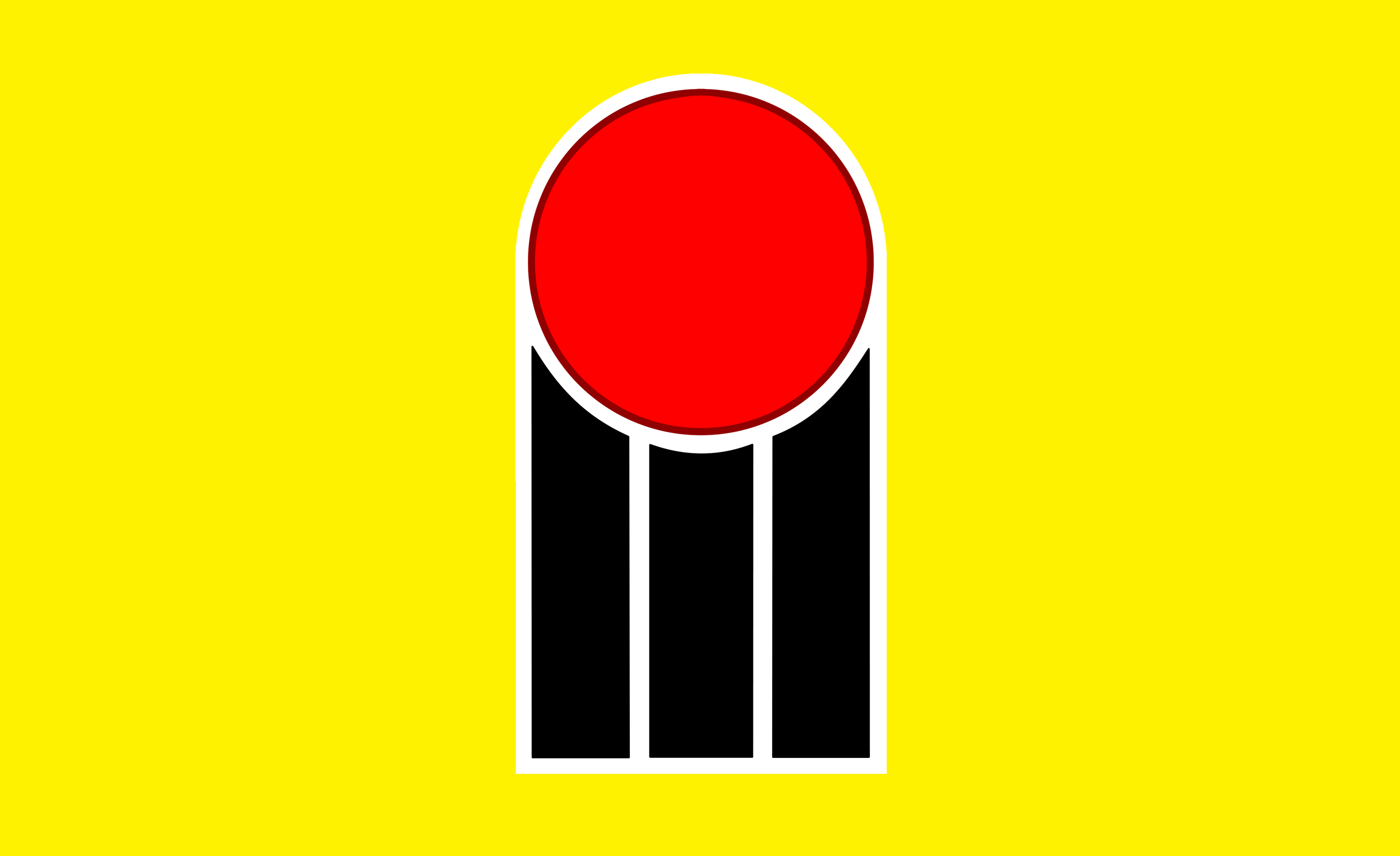

Personnel
- Captain: (Australia) Ian Chappell

Team information
- Colours: Canary yellow
- Founded: 1977
- Home ground: Various
WSC Australia XI Kit

The World Series Cricket Australia XI was a cricket team representing Australia in World Series Cricket (WSC). Their first game was against the WSC West Indies in 1977. World Series Cricket ended in 1979 after the Australian XI tour to the West Indies. The side was made up of current Australian international cricketers and some recently retired former Test players. The side was captained by Ian Chappell who had recently retired from first-class and international cricket, but returned to captain the side.

== Players ==
Australia	Nationality	Australia	Nationality
Ian Chappell (c)	Australia	Ray Bright	Australia
Greg Chappell	Australia	Trevor Chappell	Australia
Ian Davis	Australia	Ross Edwards	Australia
Gus Gilmour	Australia	David Hookes	Australia
Martin Kent	Australia	Bruce Laird	Australia
Rob Langer	Australia	Dennis Lillee	Australia
Rick McCosker	Australia	Garth McKenzie	Australia
Ashley Mallett	Australia	Mick Malone	Australia
Rod Marsh	Australia	Kerry O'Keeffe	Australia
Len Pascoe	Australia	Wayne Prior	Australia
Ian Redpath	Australia	Richie Robinson	Australia
Jeff Thomson	Australia	Max Walker	Australia
Doug Walters	Australia	Graeme Watson	Australia
Kepler Wessels	South Africa	Dennis Yagmich	Australia

== Honours ==
- Runners-up 1977/78 International Cup
- Runners-up 1978/79 Supertest Series
- Runners-up 1978/79 International Cup

== Records (Supertests) ==
=== Highest team total ===
Highest team total (over 350 runs only)
Score (Overs)	Team	Versus	Venue	Date
538-6 (100.5)	WSC Australia XI	WSC Rest Of The World XI	VFL Park, Melbourne, Victoria	9–13 February 1978
415-6(128)	WSC Australia XI	WSC West Indies XI	ARG, Antigua	6–10 April 1979
393-5 (92.4)	WSC Australia XI	WSC Rest Of The World XI	Gloucester Park, Perth, Western Australia	27–30 January 1978
388(105.2)	WSC Australia XI	WSC West Indies XI	Football Park, Adelaide, South Australia	31 December 1977 - 3 January 1978
366(121.5)	WSC Australia XI	WSC West Indies XI	VFL Park, Melbourne, Victoria	21–23 December 1978

=== Most wickets ===
- Note: Sorted by wickets then bowling average.

Player	Team	Matches	Overs	Mdns	Runs	Wkts	BBI	BBM	Ave	Econ	SR	5WI
Dennis Lillee	WSC Australia XI	14	522.1	106	1800	67	7/23	9/56	26.87	3.295	53.35	4
Ray Bright	WSC Australia XI	15	420	97	1248	42	6/52	7/64	29.71	2.88	64.25	2
Max Walker	WSC Australia XI	7	191	38	712	28	7/88	9/130	25.43	2.800	78.87	2
Len Pascoe	WSC Australia XI	9	242.1	55	866	30	3/20	5/75	32.00	3.523	58.20	0
Gary Gilmour	WSC Australia XI	7	255	56	784	23	4/26	7/129	34.87	3.097	3.09	0

=== Best bowling ===
Note: 5 wickets in an innings listed.

Bowling figures: Wickets-Runs (Overs)	Bowler	Country	Versus	Venue	Date
7-23 (14)	Dennis Lillee	WSC Australia XI	WSC West Indies XI	SCG	21 Jan '79
7-88 (28.3)	Max Walker	WSC Australia XI	WSC Rest Of The World XI	RAS	14 Jan '78
6-52 (23)	Ray Bright	WSC Australia XI	WSC West Indies XI	SCG	21 Jan '79
6-125 (33.2)	Dennis Lillee	WSC Australia XI	WSC West Indies XI	ARG	6 Apr '79
5-20 (12)	Greg Chappell	WSC Australia XI	WSC West Indies XI	Football Park	31 Dec '77
5-51 (18.5)	Dennis Lillee	WSC Australia XI	WSC Rest Of The World XI	SCG	2 Feb '79
5-62 (14)	Max Walker	WSC Australia XI	WSC Rest Of The World XI	VFL Park	9 Feb '78
5-78 (20)	Jeff Thomson	WSC Australia XI	WSC West Indies XI	Queen's Park Oval	16 March '79
5-82 (15)	Dennis Lillee	WSC Australia XI	WSC Rest Of The World XI	VFL Park	9 Feb '78
5-149 (31.2)	Ray Bright	WSC Australia XI	WSC Rest Of The World XI	Gloucester Park	27 Jan '78

=== Most runs in the tournament ===
- Note: Only top 5 players shown.

Player	Team	M	I	NO	Runs	Avg	50s	100s	HS
Greg Chappell	WSC Australia XI	14	26	1	1415	56.60	5	4	246*
Ian Chappell	WSC Australia XI	14	27	2	893	35.72	5	1	141
David Hookes	WSC Australia XI	12	22	2	771	38.55	7	1	116
Bruce Laird	WSC Australia XI	13	26	1	630	25.20	3	1	122
Rod Marsh	WSC Australia XI	15	28	1	531	19.67	1	1	102*

=== Highest individual scores ===
Note: Only top five scores listed.

Runs	Batsman	Team	Versus	Venue	Date
246*	Greg Chappell	WSC Australia XI	WSC Rest Of The World XI	VFL Park	9 Feb '78
174	Greg Chappell	WSC Australia XI	WSC Rest Of The World XI	Gloucester Park	27 Jan '78
150	Greg Chappell	WSC Australia XI	WSC West Indies XI	Queen's Park Oval	16 Mar '79
141	Ian Chappell	WSC Australia XI	WSC West Indies XI	Football Park	31 Dec '77
129	Rick McCosker	WSC Australia XI	WSC Rest Of The World XI	VFL Park	9 Feb '78

== Record against opponents ==
=== Supertests ===
Opponent	Pld	W	L	D	NR
WSC West Indies XI	10	3	3	4	0
WSC Rest Of The World XI	5	1	4	0	0

=== One Day Games ===
Opponent	Pld	W	L	A	NR
WSC West Indies XI	24	6	17	0	1
WSC Rest Of The World XI	17	8	8	2	0
WSC Cavaliers XI	4	2	1	1	0

== See also ==
- World Series Cricket results
- World Series Cricket player records
- WSC Cavaliers XI
- WSC Rest Of The Rest Of The World XI
- WSC West Indies XI
