= World Series Cricket player records =

The following lists are of records in Supertests played in World Series Cricket from 1977 to 1979.

== Supertests ==
Records from all Supertests played in World Series Cricket. There were four series of Supertests:

- 1977/78: Australia v West Indies (3 Matches)
- 1978: Australia v World XI (3)
- 1978/79: Australia v West Indies v World XI (5 [3 round robin, 1 semi-final, 1 final])
- 1979: West Indies v Australia (5)

== Team records ==
=== Results ===
Team	Matches	Won	Lost	Drawn	W/L	%W	%L	%D
Australia	15	4	7	4	0.57	26.66	46.66	26.66
West Indies	11	3	4	4	0.75	27.27	36.36	36.36
World XI	6	5	1	0	5	83.33	16.66	0

=== Highest team total ===
Highest team total (450 plus)
Score (Overs)	Team	Versus	Venue	Date
625 (114.3)	World XI	Australia	Gloucester Park, Perth, Western Australia	27-30 January 1978
538-6 (100.5)	Australia	World XI	VFL Park, Melbourne, Victoria	9-13 February 1978
481(109.4)	West Indies	Australia	Sabina Park, Jamaica	23-26 February 1979
476-5 (113.1)	West Indies	Australia	Bourda, Georgetown, Guyana	25-28 March 1979
471(163.3)	World XI	West Indies	Sydney Cricket Ground, New South Wales	21-23 December 1978

== Bowling ==
=== Most wickets in the tournament ===
- Note: Only top 10 players shown. Sorted by wickets then bowling average.

Player	Team	Matches	Overs	Mdns	Runs	Wkts	BBI	BBM	Ave	Econ	SR	5WI
Dennis Lillee	Australia	14	522.1	106	1800	67	7/23	9/56	26.87	3.295	53.35	4
Andy Roberts	West Indies	13	417.3	99	1207	50	6/69	7/104	24.14	2.608	56.68	1
Ray Bright	Australia	15	420	97	1248	42	6/52	7/64	29.71	2.88	64.25	2
Michael Holding	West Indies	9	255.1	37	808	35	5/48	7/97	23.09	2.993	44.45	1
Joel Garner	West Indies	7	284.3	43	867	35	5/52	7/113	24.77	2.598	62.25	1
Colin Croft	West Indies	7	291.7	55	866	30	5/65	6/104	28.87	2.835	58.20	1
Len Pascoe	Australia	9	242.1	55	866	30	3/20	5/75	32.00	3.523	58.20	0
Max Walker	Australia	7	191	38	712	28	7/88	9/130	25.43	2.800	78.87	2
Imran Khan	World XI	5	146.5	27	521	25	4/24	7/103	20.84	3.150	40.05	0
Gary Gilmour	Australia	7	255	56	784	23	4/26	7/129	34.87	3.097	66.50	0

=== Best innings bowling figures ===
Note: Only top ten performances listed.

Bowling figures: Wickets-Runs (Overs)	Bowler	Country	Versus	Venue	Date
7-23 (14)	Dennis Lillee	Australia	West Indies	Sydney Cricket Ground	21 January 1979
7-88 (28.3)	Max Walker	Australia	World XI	RAS	14 January 1978
6-52 (23)	Ray Bright	Australia	West Indies	Sydney Cricket Ground	21 January 1979
6-69 (12)	Andy Roberts	World XI	Australia	RAS	14 January 1978
6-81 (54.4)	Albert Padmore	West Indies	Australia	Queen's Park Oval	16 March 1979
6-125 (33.2)	Dennis Lillee	Australia	West Indies	Antigua Recreation Ground	6 April 1979
5-20 (12)	Greg Chappell	Australia	West Indies	Football Park	31 December 1977
5-39 (25.5)	Garth Le Roux	World XI	Australia	VFL Park	8 December 1978
5-48 (21)	Michael Holding	West Indies	Australia	Queen's Park Oval	16 March 1979
5-51 (18.5)	Dennis Lillee	Australia	World XI	Sydney Cricket Ground	2 February 1979

=== Best match bowling figures ===
Note: Only top ten performances listed.

Bowling figures: Wickets-Runs (Overs)	Bowler	Country	Versus	Venue	Date
9-56 (29)	Dennis Lillee	Australia	West Indies	Sydney Cricket Ground	21 January 1979
9-101 (36.1)	Garth Le Roux	World XI	Australia	Sydney Cricket Ground	2 February 1979
9-130 (39)	Max Walker	Australia	World XI	RAS	14 January 1978
8-168 (43.2)	Dennis Lillee	Australia	West Indies	Sabina Park	23 February 1979
8-64 (30.5)	Ray Bright	Australia	West Indies	Sydney Cricket Ground	21 January 1979
7-97 (49.0)	Michael Holding	West Indies	Australia	Queen's Park Oval	16 March 1979
7-103 (26.0)	Imran Khan	World XI	Australia	Gloucester Park	27 January 1978
7-104 (28)	Andy Roberts	West Indies	Australia	VFL Park	2 December 1977
7-113 (26)	Joel Garner	West Indies	Australia	Sydney Cricket Ground	16 December 1977
7-113 (27)	Max Walker	Australia	World XI	VFL Park	9 February 1978

=== Best match bowling averages ===
- Note: Only top 10 players shown.

Player	Team	Matches	Balls	Runs	Wkts	Ave	BBI	BBM	Econ	SR	5WI
Garth Le Roux	World XI	3	648	270	17	15.88	5/39	9/101	2.50	38.1	2
Mike Proctor	World XI	4	494	225	14	16.07	4/33	5/58	2.73	35.2	0
Imran Khan	World XI	5	999	521	25	20.84	4/24	7/103	3.12	39.9	0
Michael Holding	West Indies	9	1643	808	35	23.08	5/48	7/97	2.95	46.9	1
Andy Roberts	West Indies	13	2809	1207	50	24.14	6/69	7/104	2.57	56.1	1
Clive Rice	World XI	3	402	169	7	24.14	2/38	3/64	2.52	57.4	0
Joel Garner	West Indies	7	1985	867	35	24.77	5/52	7/113	2.62	56.7	1
Max Walker	Australia	7	1430	712	28	24.77	7/88	9/130	2.98	51.0	2
Greg Chappell	Australia	14	352	156	6	26.00	5/20	5/45	2.65	58.6	1
Richard Austin	West Indies	2	267	133	5	26.60	3/59	3/109	2.98	53.4	0

== Batting ==
=== Most runs in the tournament ===
- Note : Only top 10 players shown.

Player	Team	M	I	NO	Runs	Avg	100s	50s	HS
Greg Chappell	Australia	14	26	1	1415	56.60	5	4	246*
Viv Richards	West Indies	14	25	2	1281	55.70	4	4	177
Ian Chappell	Australia	14	27	2	893	35.72	1	5	141
David Hookes	Australia	12	22	2	771	38.55	1	7	116
Gordon Greenidge	West Indies	13	23	2	754	35.90	1	4	140
Clive Lloyd	West Indies	13	21	3	683	37.94	1	3	197
Bruce Laird	Australia	13	26	1	630	25.20	3	1	122
Roy Fredericks	West Indies	10	18	0	621	34.50	0	4	89
Lawrence Rowe	West Indies	9	15	2	570	43.85	2	2	175
Barry Richards	World XI	5	8	1	554	79.14	2	2	207

=== Highest average in the tournament ===
- Note : Only top 10 players shown. Not including Barry Richards who only played one series.

Player	Team	M	I	NO	Runs	Avg	100s	50s	HS
Greg Chappell	Australia	14	26	1	1415	56.60	5	4	246*
Vivian Richards	West Indies	14	25	2	1281	55.70	4	4	177
Lawrence Rowe	West Indies	9	15	2	570	43.85	2	2	175
David Hookes	Australia	12	22	2	771	38.55	1	7	116
Clive Lloyd	West Indies	13	21	3	683	37.94	1	3	197
Gordon Greenidge	West Indies	13	23	2	754	35.90	1	4	140
Ian Chappell	Australia	14	27	2	893	35.72	1	5	141
Roy Fredericks	West Indies	10	18	0	621	34.50	0	4	89
Andy Roberts	West Indies	13	20	6	439	31.35	0	2	89
Deryck Murray	West Indies	10	15	2	377	29.00	0	2	82

=== Highest individual scores ===
Note: Only top ten scores listed.

Runs	Batsman	Team	Versus	Venue	Date
246*	Greg Chappell	Australia	World XI	VFL Park	9 February 1978
207	Barry Richards	World XI	Australia	Gloucester Park	27 January 1978
197	Clive Lloyd	West Indies	Australia	Sabina Park	23 February 1979
177	Viv Richards	World XI	Australia	Gloucester Park	28 January 1978
175	Lawrence Rowe	West Indies	Australia	VFL Park	12 January 1979
174	Greg Chappell	Australia	World XI	Gloucester Park	27 January 1978
170	Viv Richards	World XI	Australia	VFL Park	9 February 1978
150	Greg Chappell	Australia	West Indies	Queen's Park Oval	16 March 1979
141	Ian Chappell	Australia	West Indies	Football Park	31 December 1977
140	Gordon Greenidge	West Indies	World XI	Gloucester Park	27 January 1978

- Viv Richards played for the World XI in the 1977/78 Supertests against Australia.

=== Highest partnerships by wicket ===
Wicket	Runs	First batsman	Second batsman	Team	Opposition	Venue	Date
1st wicket	234*	Gordon Greenidge	Barry Richards	World XI	Australia	Gloucester Park	27 January 1978
2nd wicket	219	Rick McCosker	Greg Chappell	Australia	World XI	VFL Park	9 February 1978
3rd wicket	124	Richard Austin	Lawrence Rowe	West Indies	Australia	VFL Park	12 January 1979
4th wicket	152	Greg Chappell	David Hookes	Australia	World XI	VFL Park	9 February 1978
5th wicket	121	Lawrence Rowe	Clive Lloyd	West Indies	Australia	VFL Park	12 January 1979
6th wicket	226	Clive Lloyd	Andy Roberts	West Indies	Australia	Sabina Park	23 February 1979
7th wicket	161*	Rod Marsh	Ray Bright	Australia	West Indies	Antigua Recreation Ground	6 April 1979
8th wicket	116	Greg Chappell	Ray Bright	Australia	World XI	Gloucester Park	27 January 1978
9th wicket	42	Alan Knott	Andy Roberts	World XI	Australia	VFL Park	9 February 1978
10th wicket	78	Alan Knott	Wayne Daniel	World XI	Australia	VFL Park	9 February 1978
