= World Series Cricket Cavaliers XI =

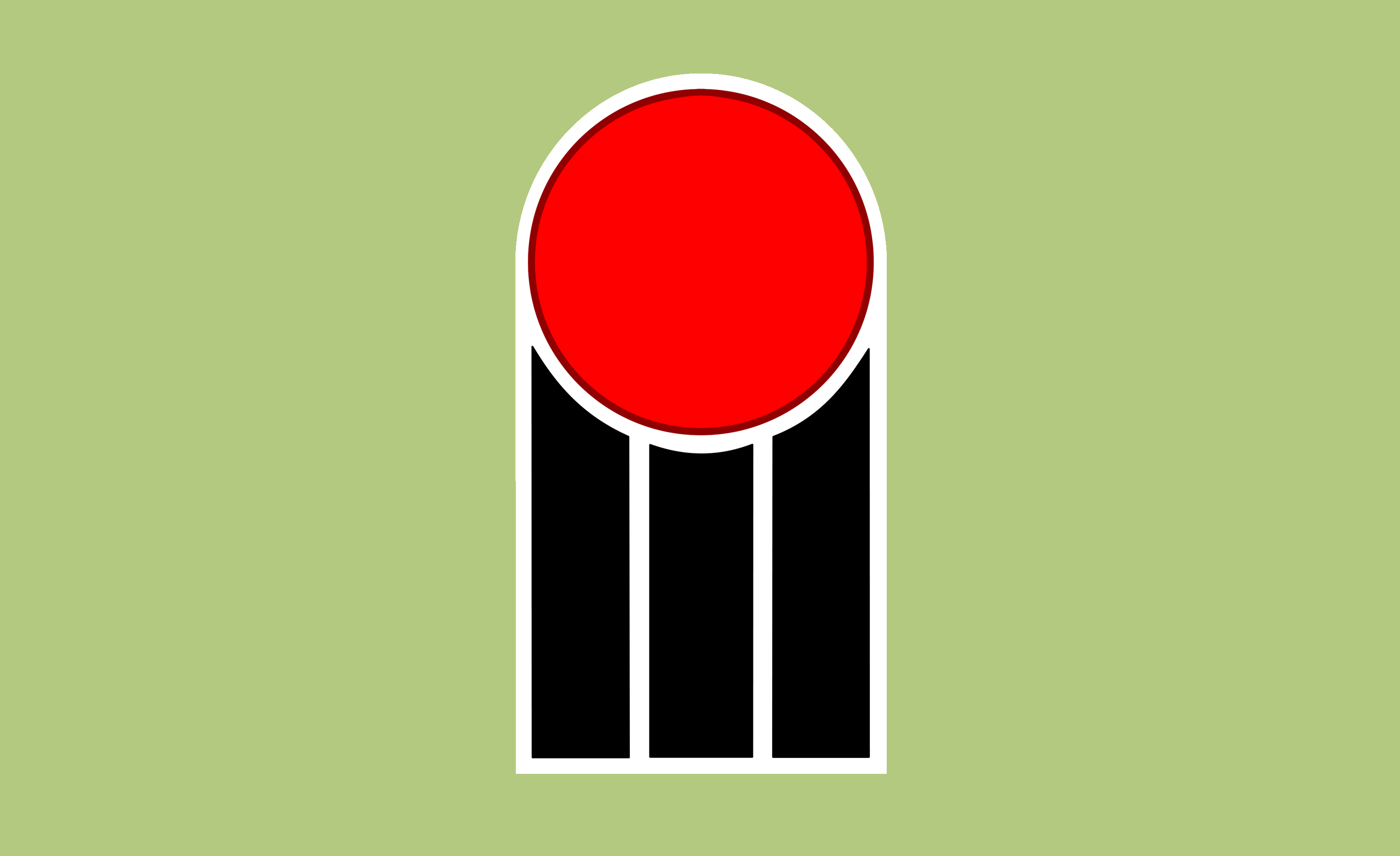

Personnel
- Captain: (South Africa) Eddie Barlow

Team information
- Colours: Olive green
- Founded: 1978
- Home ground: Various
WSC Cavaliers XI Kit

The World Series Cricket Cavaliers XI was a cricket team formed to play in World Series Cricket. Taking the International Cavaliers as its inspiration, the team was envisaged as a way of giving those players under contract to the WSC organisation, but not picked regularly for one of the three main teams (Australia XI, Rest Of The World XI and West Indies XI) regular match play and opportunities to win prize money.

The team was formed in 1978, before the start of the second season of World Series Cricket, with a tour of Australia scheduled to take place at the same time as the main competition. This would see the Cavaliers play each of the other three WSC teams at a range of smaller venues around Australia between November 1978 and February 1979.

== Cavaliers Country Tour 1978/79 ==
Following the end of the 1977/78 World Series Cricket season, Kerry Packer's organisation signed up a second tranche of players to participate in the series. The consequence of this was that there were invariably more players available than there were places in the three WSC teams. To compensate for those players who were not being selected regularly, a new side was formed in 1978 that would undertake a tour of Australia. The plan was for this new side, which came to be called the "Cavaliers XI", to take on each of the other three WSC teams in turn in a series of both one-day and two-day games. The schedule would see whichever of the three teams was not playing either a Supertest or an International Cup game taking on Cavaliers. This ensured not only that the "fringe" players got both match practice and access to prize money on offer by playing for the Cavaliers, but also that the other teams were also able to continue playing during "downtime" periods when they were not in the main WSC schedule. Many were either recently retired cricketers or younger "up-and-coming" players. It had the further effect of bringing World Series Cricket to a number of smaller venues around the country, rather than restricting it to playing in the major cities. The Country Tour for Cavaliers eventually encompassed a total of 9 two-day games and 15 one-day games. These were scheduled in four separate blocks. The first three games were all one-day, with each scheduled against one of the other WSC teams and played in Western Australia. This was followed by a two-week tour of Queensland against West Indies, then another two-week tour of Victoria and New South Wales (NSW) against Australia, with a final three-week stint against World XI, again in Victoria and NSW. The final game saw Cavaliers take on West Indies in a two-day game in Tasmania.

Cavaliers overall record

Team	Pld	W	L	D	A	NR
Australia XI	5	1	2	1	1	0
West Indies XI	9	3	5	1	0	0
Rest Of The World XI	10	1	7	1	0	1

=== Cavaliers XI v Australia XI ===
Dates(s)	Team 1	Score	Team 2	Score	Result	Venue
24 Nov 1978	Australia XI		Cavaliers XI XI		Match Abandoned	Recreation Reserve, Bunbury, Western Australia
17 Dec 1978	Australia XI	174/8	Cavaliers XI XI	93	Australia XI won by 81 runs	Sports Ground, Maitland, New South Wales
23 Dec 1978	Australia XI	183/7	Cavaliers XI XI	85	Australia XI won by 98 runs	Showgrounds, Traralgon, Victoria
24 Dec 1978	Cavaliers XI XI	172/6	Australia XI	100	Cavaliers XI won by 72 runs	Football Ground, Morwell, Victoria
3-4 Jan 1979	Cavaliers XI XI	195; 106/5 dec.	Australia XI	104; 162/4	Match Drawn	Oakes Oval, Lismore, New South Wales

=== WSC Cavaliers XI v WSC West Indies XI ===
Dates(s)	Team 1	Score	Team 2	Score	Result	Venue
23 Nov 1978	Cavaliers XI	224/6	West Indies XI	225/5	West Indies XI won by 5 wickets	Sir Richard Moore Sports Centre, Kalgoorlie, Western Australia
1-2 Dec 1978	West Indies XI	214; 84	Cavaliers XI	216/9 dec. 86/3	Cavaliers XI won by 7 wickets	Barlow Park, Cairns, Queensland
3-4 Dec 1978	West Indies XI	214; 112/4	Cavaliers XI	131	Match Drawn	Endeavour Park, Townsville, Queensland
6 Dec 1978	Cavaliers XI	213	West Indies XI	216/3	West Indies XI won by 7 wickets	Ray Mitchell Oval, Mackay, Queensland
8-9 Dec 1978	Cavaliers XI	339/9	West Indies XI	290/5	West Indies XI won by faster run rate	Association Ground, Rockhampton, Queensland
10 Dec 1978	West Indies XI	194/9	Cavaliers XI	125	West Indies XI won by 69 runs	Queensland Almunia Sports Club Oval, Gladstone, Queensland
12 Dec 1978	West Indies XI	214/3	Cavaliers XI	173	West Indies XI won by 41 runs	Salk Oval, Currumbin, Queensland
13 Dec 1978	West Indies XI	173	Cavaliers XI	113/8	Cavaliers XI won by faster run rate	Gold Park, Toowoomba, Queensland
3-4 Feb 1979	Cavaliers XI	78; 208/5 dec.	West Indies XI	112; 140	Cavaliers XI won by 31 runs	Girdlestone Park, Devonport, Tasmania

=== WSC Cavaliers v World XI ===
Dates(s)	Team 1	Score	Team 2	Score	Result	Venue
25 Nov 1978	Cavaliers XI	181/8	Rest Of The World XI	185/7	Rest Of The World XI won by 3 wickets	Recreation Reserve, Bunbury, Western Australia
26 Dec 1978	Cavaliers XI	113	Rest Of The World XI	10/1	No Result	No. 1 Sports Ground, Newcastle, New South Wales
7 Jan 1979	Rest Of The World XI	261/6	Cavaliers XI	167	Rest Of The World XI won by 94 runs	Mildura City Oval, Mildura, Victoria
10-11 Jan 1979	Cavaliers XI	326/6	Rest Of The World XI	329/7	World XI win by 3 wickets	Queen Elizabeth II Oval, Bendigo, Victoria
13-14 Jan 1979	Cavaliers XI	140; 97	Rest Of The World XI	343	Rest Of The World XI won by an innings and 106 runs	No. 1 Oval, Tamworth, New South Wales
17 Jan 1979	Cavaliers XI	132	Rest Of The World XI	135/4	Rest Of The World XI won by 6 wickets	Moran Oval, Armidale, New South Wales
20-21 Jan 1979	Rest Of The World XI	170	Cavaliers XI	219/2	Match Drawn	Wade Park, Orange, New South Wales
24 Jan 1979	Rest Of The World XI	167	Cavaliers XI	168/0	Cavaliers XI won by 10 wickets	Robertson Oval, Wagga Wagga, New South Wales
27-28 Jan 1979	Cavaliers XI	323/7	Rest Of The World XI	324/7	Rest Of The World XI won by 3 wickets	Albury Sports Ground, Albury, New South Wales
29 Jan 1979	Cavaliers XI	158/9	Rest Of The World XI	160/6	Rest Of The World XI won by 4 wickets	Melville Oval, Hamilton, Victoria

== See also ==
- World Series Cricket results
- World Series Cricket player records
- WSC Australia XI
- WSC Rest Of The World XI
- WSC West Indies XI
