= Taslim Arif =

Pakistani cricketer (1954–2008)

Personal information
- Full name: Taslim Arif Abbasi
- Born: 1 May 1954; PIB Colony, Karachi, Pakistan
- Died: 14 March 2008 (aged 53); Karachi, Pakistan
- Batting: Right-handed
- Bowling: Right-arm medium
- Role: Wicket-keeper

International information
- National side: Pakistan (1980)
- Test debut (cap 82): 29 January 1980 v India
- Last Test: 8 December 1980 v West Indies
- ODI debut (cap 31): 21 November 1980 v West Indies
- Last ODI: 19 December 1980 v West Indies

Domestic team information
- Years: Team
- 1967/68–1989/90: Karachi
- 1967/68–1989/90: NBP

Career statistics
Competition	Test	ODI	FC	LA
Matches	6	2	148	40
Runs scored	501	28	7,568	853
Batting average	62.62	14.00	33.63	25.84
100s/50s	1/2	0/0	13/40	1/4
Top score	210*	24	210*	113*
Balls bowled	30	–	311	–
Wickets	1	–	7	–
Bowling average	28.00	–	30.28	–
5 wickets in innings	0	–	0	–
10 wickets in match	0	–	0	–
Best bowling	1/28	–	4/46	–
Catches/stumpings	6/3	1/1	312/56	45/14
- Source: ESPNcricinfo.com, 6 January 2008

Taslim Arif Abbasi (1 May 1954 – 14 March 2008) was a Pakistani cricketer who played in six Test matches and 2 One Day Internationals (ODIs) in 1980. His score of 210* for Pakistan against Australia stood for more than 20 years as the highest score made by a wicket-keeper in Test cricket, until broken by Zimbabwean Andy Flower in 2000. Arif died in Karachi from a lung infection in 2008. He was buried at Faisal Cantonment cemetery in Karachi.

He went to a local government school in P.I.B colony Karachi. After finishing his matriculation he was admitted to National College Karachi on the basis of his cricket record. He continued to play for the college team in intercollegiate matches. His mentor Professor Mukarram Ali Khan Shirwani played a major role in introducing him to several selectors as an outstanding and budding wicketkeeper batsman. During his days in the college he had several team members who gained national duties. One of his teammates was Mohsin Hassan Khan who played for Pakistan as an opener and later became a national coach. Along with most of his teammates he was against political parties involvement in students politics. He actively supported Fasahat Ali Khan against Hussain Haqani of Islami Jamiate Talaba by bringing in the entire sports teams to vote which resulted in Fasahat winning the students union elections.

== Record ==
In September 1978, playing for National Bank against Punjab in Lahore, before he had made his international debut, Arif became the first Pakistani wicket keeper to effect ten dismissals in a first-class match. His record was later broken by Wasim Yousoufi in 1997.
