= World Series Cricket West Indies XI =

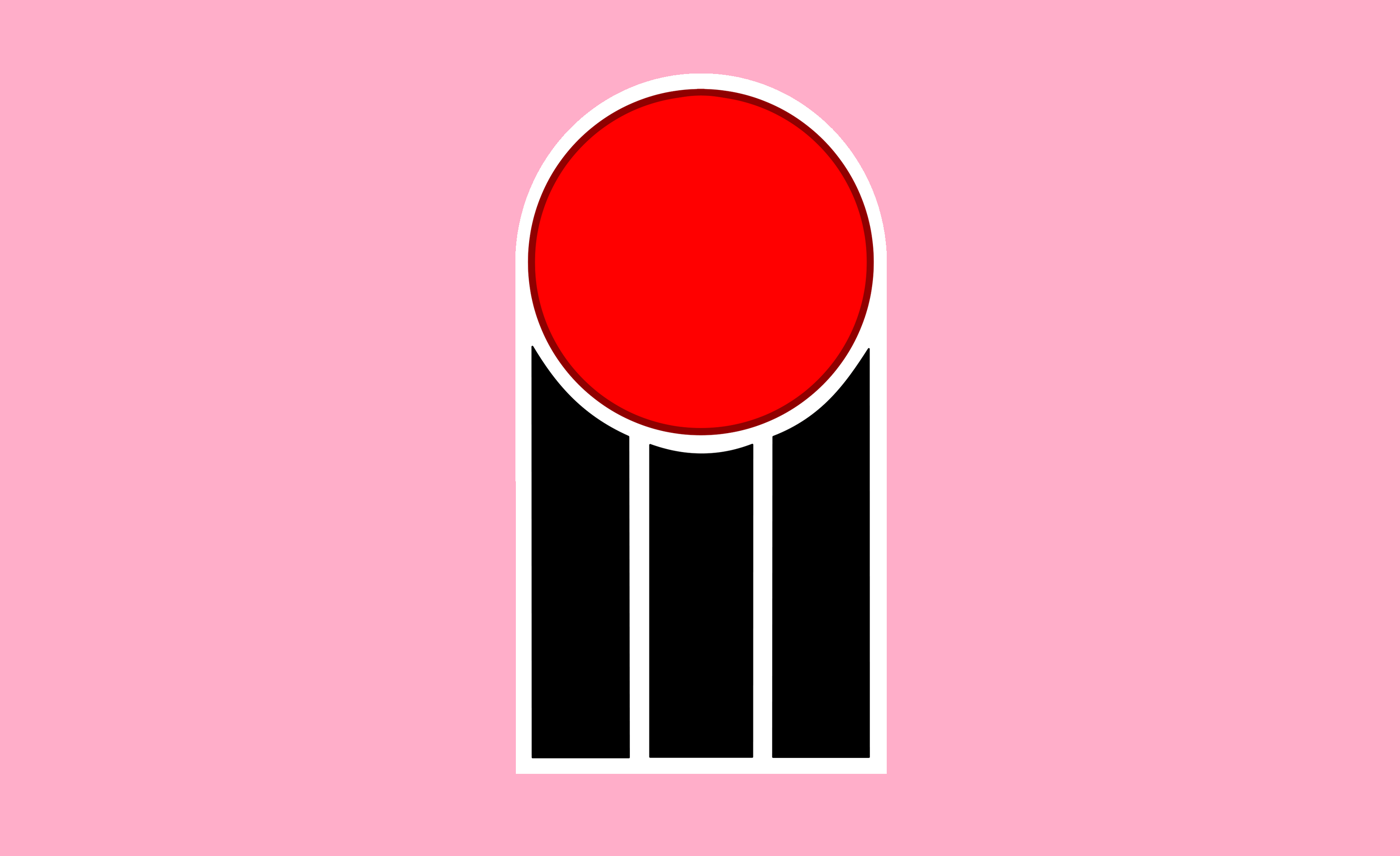

Personnel
- Captain: (Guyana) Clive Lloyd

Team information
- Colours: Light hot pink
- Founded: 1977
- Home ground: Various
WSC West Indies XI Kit

The World Series Cricket West Indies XI was a cricket team representing West Indies in World Series Cricket (WSC). Their first game was against the WSC Australia XI in 1977. World Series Cricket ended in 1979 after the Australian XI tour to the West Indies. The side was composed of current West Indian international cricketers, except for Jim Allen, the only squad member not to play Test cricket. During WSC many of the West Indian squad also played against the official Australian touring side, that did not feature WSC cricketers. Against in effect a second string Australia West Indies won the first two tests convincingly (by an innings in the first and nine wickets in the second). Only Alvin Kallicharran and Derick Parry played who were not signed to WSC. However, when the WSC cricketers were unavailable from the third test, the contests were more even. Australia won the third test (by three wickets), West Indies the fourth (by 198 runs), while the fifth was drawn.

== Players ==
West Indies	Nationality
Clive Lloyd	Antigua and Barbuda
Viv Richards	Antigua and Barbuda
Gordon Greenidge	Barbados
Andy Roberts	Antigua and Barbuda
Deryck Murray	Trinidad and Tobago
Roy Fredericks	Guyana
Lawrence Rowe	Jamaica
Michael Holding	Jamaica
Collis King	Barbados
Joel Garner	Antigua and Barbuda
Wayne Daniel	Guyana
Colin Croft	Guyana
Albert Padmore	Barbados
Desmond Haynes	Barbados
Richard Austin	Guyana
Jim Allen	Montserrat
David Holford	Barbados
Bernard Julien	Trinidad and Tobago
Lance Gibbs	Guyana
Rohan Kanhai	Guyana

== See also ==
- World Series Cricket results
- World Series Cricket player records
- WSC Australia XI
- WSC Cavaliers XI
- WSC Rest Of The World XI
