= Garth Le Roux =

South African cricketer (born 1955)

Garth Stirling Le Roux (born 4 September 1955 in Kenilworth, Cape Town) is a former South African first class cricketer. He went to Wynberg Boys' High School, graduating in 1973.

Le Roux was a powerful fast bowler and big hitting tail-end batsman, scoring 26 half centuries in his career. His career coincided with South Africa's ban from international cricket, and he did not play official Test cricket.

After making his first class debut, Le Roux played for South African Universities in 1976–77. During the 1977–78 season, he took 53 Currie Cup wickets and was invited to play for Sussex. Playing for Sussex, he was recruited to play World Series Cricket in Australia where he joined fellow exiles and countrymen, Eddie Barlow, Mike Procter, Clive Rice and Barry Richards. Deprived of international cricket because of the sporting ban due to Apartheid, the South Africans were desperate to do well. With his hostile action and speed, he won the Man of the Series award.

Le Roux had a successful county career with Sussex from 1978 to 1987, playing for the county against New Zealand in 1978 and Australia in 1985. In South Africa he played Currie Cup cricket for Western Province between 1975 and 1989 and was cricketer of the year in 1978, 1986 and 1987. He represented South Africa in 15 unofficial "Tests", taking a hat-trick against the Australian XI in 1986. Le Roux also played in 29 List A matches for South Africa.

On 10 April 2006 Le Roux appeared in court charged with 48 counts of tax fraud involving R 1.8 million. He was found guilty and on 5 December 2008 was sentenced to 4 years in prison. The Cape High Court overturned the conviction on 23 September 2010 and cleared Le Roux of all charges.

== First Class career ==
Team	Matches	Runs	Average	HScore	Bowled	Wickets	Average	SR
South Africa	15	285	15.83	45	2960	59	23.06	50.1
S.A.Universities	1	18	18.00	18	174	7	7.14	24.8
Sussex	137	3341	28.31	83	19662	393	23.16	50.0
Western Province	86	1781	23.75	86	16626	379	19.22	43.9
Total:	239	5425	25.72	86	39422	838	21.24	47.0

== List A career ==
Team	Matches	Runs	Average	HScore	Bowled	Wickets	Average	SR
South Africa	29	269	24.45	58	1489	47	20.57	31.6
Sussex	138	1997	24.96	88	6313	197	20.81	32.0
Western Province	83	885	20.11	43	4399	134	18.55	32.8
Total:	250	2911	21.56	88	12201	378	19.99	32.3

== World Series Cricket 1978–79 ==
Competition	Matches	Runs	Average	HScore	Bowled	Wickets	Average	SR
Supertests	3	34	11.33	33*	648	17	15.88	38.1
International Cup	9	32	16.00	12*	337	17	13.00	19.8
100 Over Matches	3	6	3.00	6	272	10	10.00	27.2
Country Tour	7	12	6.00	11	330	8	16.38	41.2
