= Wayne Prior =

South Australian cricketer (born 1952)

Personal information
- Born: 30 September 1952 (age 74); Salisbury, South Australia
- Batting: Right-handed
- Bowling: Right-arm fast

Domestic team information
- Years: Team
- 1974/75–1984/85: South Australia

Career statistics
Competition	First-class	List A
Matches	48	10
Runs scored	186	29
Batting average	6.00	4.83
100s/50s	0/0	0/0
Top score	27	12
Balls bowled	8,785	573
Wickets	140	16
Bowling average	33.07	26.56
5 wickets in innings	6	0
10 wickets in match	1	0
Best bowling	6/41	4/24
Catches/stumpings	29/–	2/–
- Source: CricketArchive, 29 June 2014

Wayne Prior (born 30 September 1952) is a former South Australian cricketer. He never played in the official Australian team, but did play for Australia in World Series Cricket.

== Early life and career ==
Born in Salisbury, South Australia, Prior played cricket and Australian rules football as a junior before developing into a tall, rangy right-arm fast bowler, who, on his day, was one of the fastest in Australia.

Prior made his first-class debut for South Australia on 1 November 1974 against the touring MCC team at Adelaide Oval, taking 1/60 and 0/18.

After a moderately successful debut season, Prior became one of the stand out performers of the 1975–76 Australian cricket season, taking 43 wickets at 19.67, including 6/41 against the touring West Indian team and match figures of 10/168 against New South Wales, including a hat trick. Prior's bowling was a key element in South Australia winning the Sheffield Shield and led to media speculation that he would be included in the Australian Test side against the West Indies. While the large pool of talented fast bowlers available in Australia kept Prior out of the Test team, former English fast bowler Frank Tyson was sufficiently impressed by his performances to confidentially predict that Prior would be a future mainstay of the Australian side.

Prior spent the 1976 English cricket season playing English club cricket, as well as stints for the Kent Second XI and DH Robins' XI. His 1976-77 season for South Australia was disappointing in comparison to his previous season, realising only 17 wickets at 43.00, but Prior was still considered as a future Test player. His problem, common to many cricketers of his era, was monetary. With cricket providing little financial compensation, Prior was required to work to earn a living, doing so as a casual labourer with a suburban Adelaide council until South Australian Cricket Association officials organised work for him with an Adelaide car dealer.

== World Series Cricket ==
Prior's financial situation was still precarious however, and so when he was offered a significant contract to join the new World Series Cricket (WSC) competition (as well as the opportunity to again play under his former captain at South Australia, Ian Chappell), Prior jumped at the opportunity.

Prior played two WSC Super Tests, both in 1977-78 taking two wickets at 116.00.

He played in eight WSC International Cup matches, taking four wickets at 54.00. While Prior's bowling statistics were poor, teammates were impressed with his attitude and his pace, once breaking Kepler Wessels' ribs in a country match.

== Post World Series Cricket ==
Following the end of World Series Cricket, Prior returned to South Australia for the 1979-80 season, taking 26 wickets at 41.53. He also bought a farm in Lobethal, South Australia with the proceeds of his WSC payments, and his ensuing farm duties led to his unavailability for some matches.

Prior missed most of the 1981-82 season (when South Australia won the Sheffield Shield) due to a mixture of farm commitments and a suspension arising from disputing an umpire's decision in an Adelaide grade match.

At his retirement at the end of the 1984/85 season, Prior had played 48 first-class matches for 140 wickets at 33.07. Referred to as "a placid, easy-going character until he gets a ball in his hand and sees a batsman at the other end", Prior was usually known by his nickname "Fang". After losing his front teeth in an Australian rules football match, Prior wore dentures, which he then lost while surfing, leading South Australian teammate Terry Jenner to name him "Fang".

Some cricket writers have named Prior amongst the most unlucky players not to have played for Australia. David Hookes, Prior's captain at South Australia, was one who believed Prior should have played Test cricket, calling him "a genuine fast and away-swing bowler", and noting that Prior often troubled West Indian champion Viv Richards more than any of his Australian fast bowling counterparts.

== Sources ==
- Sexton, Michael (2017) Chappell's Last Stand, Affirm Press: Melbourne. ISBN 1-9255-8442-9.
