= Dennis Yagmich =

Australian cricketer (born 1948)

Personal information
- Full name: Dennis Brian Yagmich
- Born: 23 August 1948 (age 78); Victoria Park, Western Australia
- Batting: Right-handed
- Role: Wicketkeeper

Domestic team information
- Years: Team
- 1972/73–1973/74: Western Australia
- 1974/75–1976/77: South Australia

Career statistics
Competition	First-class	List A
Matches	24	2
Runs scored	319	7
Batting average	13.29	7.00
100s/50s	0/0	0/0
Top score	45	6
Catches/stumpings	73/13	5/1
- Source: Cricinfo, 26 February 2019

Dennis Brian Yagmich (born 23 August 1948) is a former Australian cricketer.

Yagmich played in 24 first-class matches in a career spanning 1972/73 and 1976/77. As a right hand batsman and wicket-keeper he also played in six World Series Cricket Country Cup matches (a series of non-capital city matches played between the WSC SuperTests series) for Australia in 1977/78.

For his local club Midland-Guildford Cricket Club, he holds the record for the most career dismissals as a wicketkeeper: 332 (272 catches, 60 stumpings) and the most dismissals in a season: 46 in 1968–69 (39c, 7st).

Yagmich currently works as an accountant in the Midland area and is an officeholder at the Western Australian Croatian Chamber of Commerce.
