= Cricket statistics =

Cricket is a sport that generates a variety of statistics.

Statistics are recorded for each player during a match, and aggregated over a career. At the professional level, statistics for Test cricket, One Day International (ODI), and first-class cricket are recorded separately. However, since Test matches are a form of first-class cricket, a player's first-class statistics will include their Test match statistics – but not vice versa. Nowadays, records are also maintained for List A and Twenty20 matches. These matches are normally limited over games played domestically at the national level by leading Test nations. Since one-day internationals are a form of List A limited over matches, a player's List A statistics will include their ODI match statistics – but not vice versa.

== General statistics ==
- Matches (Mat/M/Mts): Number of matches played. (also Played (Pl).)
- Catches (Ct): Number of catches taken.
- Stumpings (St): Number of stumpings made (as a wicket-keeper).

== Batting statistics ==
- Innings (I): The number of innings in which the batsman actually batted.
- Not outs (NO): The number of times the batsman was not out at the conclusion of an innings they batted in.^{1}
- Runs (R): The number of runs scored.
- 4's: The number of 4's the batsmen has scored.
- 6's: The number of 6's the batsmen has scored.
- Highest score (HS/Best): The highest score ever made by the batsman.
- Batting average (Ave): The total number of runs divided by the total number of innings in which the batsman was out. Ave = Runs/[I – NO] (also Avge or Avg.)
- Centuries (100): The number of innings in which the batsman scored one hundred runs or more.
- Half-centuries (50): The number of innings in which the batsman scored fifty to ninety-nine runs (centuries do not count as half-centuries as well).
- Balls faced (BF or B): The total number of balls received, including no-balls but not including wides.
- Strike rate (SR): The average number of runs scored per 100 balls faced. (SR = [100 * Runs]/BF)
- Run rate (RR): The average number of runs a batsman (or the batting side) scores in an over of 6 balls.
- Net run rate (NRR): A method of ranking teams with equal points in limited overs league competitions.
- Runs Per Wicket Ratio (RpW ratio): The number of runs scored per wicket lost, divided by the number of runs conceded per wicket taken. It is a method of ranking teams with equal points in the league table of the World Test Championship.

^{1} Batsmen who are not required to bat in a particular innings (due to victory or declaration) are not considered "Not Out" in that innings. Only the player/s who have taken to the crease and remained there until the completion of an innings, are marked "Not Out" on the scorecard. For statistical purposes, batsmen who retire due to injury or illness are also deemed not out, while batsmen who retire for any other reason are deemed out, except in exceptional circumstances (in 1983 Gordon Greenidge, not out on 154, departed a Test match to be with his daughter, who was ill and subsequently died – he was subsequently deemed not out the only such decision in the history of Test cricket).

== Bowling statistics ==
- Overs (O or OV): The number of overs bowled. The notation is (x.y), meaning x completed overs plus y legal balls in the current over have been bowled.
- Balls (B): The number of balls bowled. Overs is more traditional, but balls is a more useful statistic because the number of balls per over has varied historically (and even within a single match, can vary due to umpire miscounting).
- Maiden overs (M): The number of maiden overs (overs in which the bowler conceded zero runs) bowled.
- Runs (R): The number of runs conceded.
- Wickets (W): The number of wickets taken.
- Bowling analysis (BA or OMRW): A shorthand notation consisting of a bowler's Overs, Maidens, Runs conceded and Wickets taken (in that order), usually for a single innings but sometimes for other periods. For example, an analysis of 10–3–27–2 would indicate that the player bowled ten overs, of which three were maidens, conceded 27 runs and took two wickets.
- No-balls (Nb): The number of no-balls bowled.
- Wides (Wd): The number of wides bowled.
- Bowling average (Ave): The average number of runs conceded per wicket. (Ave = Runs/W)
- Strike rate (SR): The average number of balls bowled per wicket taken. (SR = Balls/W)
- Economy rate (Econ): The average number of runs conceded per over. (Econ = Runs/Overs bowled).
- Best bowling (BB): The bowler's best bowling performance, defined as firstly the greatest number of wickets, secondly the fewest runs conceded for that number of wickets. (Thus, a performance of 7 for 102 is considered better than one of 6 for 19.)
  - BBI stands for Best Bowling in Innings and only gives the score for one innings. (If only the BB rate is given it's considered the BBI rate.)
  - BBM stands for Best Bowling in Match and gives the combined score over 2 or more innings in one match. (For limited-overs matches with one innings per side, this score is equal to the BBI or BB.)
- Five wickets in an innings (5w): The number of innings in which the bowler took at least five wickets. Four wickets in an innings (4w), the number of innings in which the bowler took exactly four wickets, is sometimes recorded alongside five wickets, especially in limited overs cricket.
- Ten wickets in a match (10w): The number of matches in which the bowler took at least ten wickets; recorded for Tests and first-class matches only.

Common notation:

⟨Bowler⟩ ⟨Number of overs⟩ – ⟨Number of maidens⟩ – ⟨Number of runs conceded⟩ – ⟨Number of wickets taken⟩

== Dynamic and graphical statistics ==
The advent of T20 cricket has contributed to the impetus to develop new and interesting forms of presenting statistical data to viewers.

These include displaying two-dimensional and even three-dimensional plots of shot directions and distances on an overhead view of a cricket field, commonly referred to as a Wagon-Wheel. Other forms include graphs of run scoring and wicket taking numbers plotted against time or balls bowled over a career or within a match. These graphics can be changed dynamically through a computer-controlled back-end, as statistics evolve during a game. Commonly used graphics, especially during a limited-over match, are a worm graph, called so, for the worm-like appearance of the teams' score progression as the overs progress; and; a Manhattan Chart, called so, for its resemblance to the Manhattan skyline.

== Notation ==
The asterisk (the * symbol) is used to mean different things in different contexts:

- In the context of the two batsmen currently out in the field, it is used to indicate which of them is the striker.
- For a batsman who appears in a scorecard (i.e. in an assessment of the batting performance of all batsmen on his team), it is used to indicate that the batsman finished not out in the innings.
- In a team lineup, the captain has an asterisk placed after his name.

Parentheses (or numbers presented in smaller font next to other numbers) generally indicate number of balls:

- For a bowler, the number of overs they have bowled is sometimes placed in parentheses next to their number of wickets taken and runs conceded i.e. 3–45 (5.2) indicates 5.2 overs have been bowled.
- For a batsman, they indicate the number of balls faced i.e. 20 (33) means 20 runs scored from 33 deliveries.

A slash or dash between two numbers usually indicates that one of the numbers is the number of runs, and the other number is the number of wickets:

- 3/21 for a bowler means 3 wickets taken but 21 runs conceded. (See bowling analysis.)
- 100–3 for a team means 100 runs scored for 3 wickets lost. (Australia reverses this order.)

Innings are sometimes shortened to "inns" or "inn" i.e. 2nd inns of a Test match.

== See also ==
- Lists of cricket records
- List of Test cricket records
- List of One Day International cricket records
- List of first-class cricket records
- List of List A cricket records
- List of Twenty20 International records
- Scorer
- The Association of Cricket Statisticians and Historians
- Variations in published cricket statistics
