= Bruce Laird =

Australian cricketer (born 1950)

Personal information
- Born: 21 November 1950 (age 75); Mount Lawley, Western Australia
- Batting: Right-handed

International information
- National side: Australia
- Test debut (cap 306): 1 December 1979 v West Indies
- Last Test: 14 October 1982 v Pakistan
- ODI debut (cap 57): 27 November 1979 v West Indies
- Last ODI: 8 October 1982 v Pakistan

Domestic team information
- Years: Team
- 1972/73–1983/84: Western Australia

Career statistics
Competition	Test	ODI	FC	LA
Matches	21	23	103	49
Runs scored	1,341	594	6,085	1,160
Batting average	35.28	29.70	35.37	25.21
100s/50s	0/11	1/2	8/41	1/6
Top score	92	117*	171	117*
Balls bowled	18	–	104	–
Wickets	0	–	0	–
Bowling average	–	–	–	–
5 wickets in innings	–	–	–	–
10 wickets in match	–	–	–	–
Best bowling	–	–	–	–
Catches/stumpings	16/–	5/–	86/–	86/–
Medal record
Men's Cricket
Representing Australia
ICC Cricket World Cup
Runner-up	1975 England
- Source: CricInfo, 8 June 2007

Bruce Malcolm Laird (born 21 November 1950) is a former Western Australian and Australian cricketer. He was an opening batsmen who played in 21 Test matches and 23 One Day Internationals. He also played 13 "Supertests" in World Series Cricket organised by Kerry Packer. He was a part of the Australian squad which finished as runners-up at the 1975 Cricket World Cup.

== Early career ==
=== 1972–73 season ===
Bruce Laird represented his home state of Western Australia in Sheffield Shield cricket, making his debut in February 1973 aged 22. He opened the batting against a strong Victorian bowling line-up including Alan Thomson and Alan Hurst. Laird was dismissed early in both innings scoring 3 and 16. Western Australia won by 3 wickets and went on to win the 1972/73 Shield.

=== 1973–74 and 1974–75 Seasons ===
Laird would not force his way into the first XI in the 1973/74 season but would become the regular opener in the 1974/75 season. His first century came against New South Wales in just his fourth first-class match. He started to be talked of as a future test player.

Laird scored 117 in a first wicket partnership of 203 with Wally Edwards. His second hundred was scored against Queensland, he scored 127 before being run out. In eight matches he scored 703 runs, joint top of the charts with the great Greg Chappell, at an average of 46.86 scoring two hundreds and four fifties. Laird's excellent season was rewarded with a place on the 1975 Ashes Tour to England and Canada.

== International recognition ==
=== 1975 Ashes Tour ===
Laird scored 80 in a game in Canada.

He did not play in any of the Test matches but did play in nine first-class matches against the County sides. He scored 488 runs in 9 matches at an average of 32.53, with a top score of 127. He was unlucky not to be picked for the first Test match having made 207 runs in three County matches. However the selectors backed Alan Turner who had made 156 against Kent in the first County match and Rick McCosker. The decision proved correct as the Australians thrashed England at Edgbaston by an innings and 85 runs. Despite only scoring 359 runs in the first innings, Australia bowled England out twice for 101 and 173. McCosker then cemented his place in the side with back-to-back hundreds against Sussex at Hove. The remaining tests were all drawn and Australia retained the Ashes with a 1–0 series win.

Peter McFarline thought Laird suffered from "unlucky and untimely dismissals" in the tour games.

=== 1975–76 season ===
The following season with Western Australia was a disappointment for Laird. He played all eight Shield matches but scored just one hundred and averaged only 28.07. His side struggled with the bat with no player scoring more than one hundred, but with top fast bowlers Mick Malone and Dennis Lillee they managed to win four matches.

=== 1976–77 season ===
Laird was in the running for a spot in the Australian team that summer, especially after scoring 171 against Queensland, but lost out to Ian Davis. Laird was not selected on the tour for New Zealand and when Alan Turner was dropped from the test side for the Centenary Test, he was replaced as opener by Rick McCosker, who had been playing at number three, allowing Australia to select David Hookes. In the end, the selectors only took two openers to England - Davis and McCosker - and omitted Laird; instead they took David Hookes, Kim Hughes and Craig Serjeant as new batters.

Laird did help WA win the Shield that summer.

During the 1977 Ashes Australia was forced to play Richie Robinson and Craig Serjeant as openers due to poor form from Davis.

== World Series Cricket ==
Laird was signed up to Kerry Packer's World Series Cricket in 1977. He was a regular in the Australian team, playing in 13 Supertests.

=== 1977–78 season ===
Laird did not play in the first Supertest in 1977-78, as the Australians used Rick McCosker and Ian Davis. However he made 81 in a one day game against the West Indies XI in Albury.

Laird was selected the second Supertest, against the West Indies, replacing Ian Davis. Laird made 28 (off 163 balls) and 18, in a game best remembered for David Hookes' jaw being broken.

Laird played in the 3rd Supertest against the West Indies at Football Park, Adelaide. He only made 25 (off 106 balls) in the first innings, but scored 106 in the second (being dropped when on six and 40). This effort was crucial in helping the Australians to a 220 run win. Ian Chappell said Laird's performance was "probably the most pleasing thing to come out" of the game "considering Australia's opening performances over the years... He gave a hint of what was to come in Sydney and now having capitalised with an international century he should go from strength to strength."

Laird scored 106 again in the first innings of the next Supertest, against the World XI at RAS Showground, Sydney. He made just five in the second innings and the Australians lost by 4 wickets.

In the next Supertest, against the World XI, Laird made 6 and 20. He missed the sixth and final game due to a broken finger.

Laird played in several one day games for WSC Australia with a highest score of 29.

=== 1978–79 season ===
The second season of World Series Cricket was not as successful for Laird at home. In the Supertests he scored 11 and 9, 2 and 8, 0 and 26 and (in the final, against the World XI) 2 and 58. Laird also performed poorly in the one day games apart from 68 in a match against the West Indies.

Laird did enough to be selected for the WSC Tour of the West Indies. There he played in all five Supertests. He made 14 and 5 in the first, which the WSC West Indies won by 369 runs. In the second, a draw, he made 3 and 6. However the third Supertest, at Queen's Park Oval, Trinidad and Tobago, was one of Laird's greatest games of all time. In Australia's first innings Laird scored 122, rescuing his team which at one stage was 5-32 and helping them reach 246. He was dismissed for 0 in the second innings but Australia managed to win the game by 24 runs. Laird had limited returns for the next two Supertests, both drawn, making 6 and 13, and 2 and 29. In the ODIs he only made one fifty, 56 in the third.

== Return to Official Cricket ==
=== 1979–80 season ===
After Packer reached a deal with the cricket authorities the Australian WSC players returned to their State sides and were once again available for international selection. This test season was run in the same format as Packer's Supertests with matches played between three sides, England also featuring.

Having played well during WSC Laird was selected immediately for the Australian XI to face the West Indies in 1979 at Brisbane, for his Test debut. He scored 92 and 72 in the drawn match.

Laird scored 69 in the second innings of the second test however the Australians were thrashed by ten wickets. Another fifty followed in the third and final test however the West Indians won convincingly again by 408 runs.

In the two tests Laird played against England his top score was 74 in the third test. Australia beat England in all three matches.

Alongside the test series against the West Indies, the first World Series Cup was played. The tournament was the spin-off from WSC and followed the same triangular format, England again being the third team. Laird played his first ODI against the West Indies on 27 November 1979 scoring 20 from 38 balls as Australia won by 5 wickets. That would be his top score in the tournament as Australia did not qualify for the final.

Rod Marsh wrote, "Laird's reliability in the opening role was a big factor in what I rate a successful summer. Bruce has always handled the fast men magnificently, but he used to strike trouble with the medium pacers and spinners. All too often he'd see the shine off the ball but then give his wicket away to a bowler just rolling his arm over. But Bruce has worked on his game and is now capable of going on to big scores."

Christopher Martin-Jenkins observed, "Australia's greatest gain this summer has been Bruce Laird. "

Bill O'Reilly claimed Laird "is the only one of Australia's younger players certain to hold his batting place for years to come."

=== 1980 Tour of Pakistan ===
A tour to Pakistan followed in February 1980 just days after the conclusion of the third test against England.

Greg Chappell led the side and Laird partnered Graham Yallop at the top of the order in the first test in Karachi. The Pakistan side featured seven former WSC players and defeated the Australians by 7 wickets. It was in Karachi that Laird passed 500 test runs.

Having gone 1–0 up the second test was played on a typically dead Pakistani wicket designed for a draw. Australia scored 617 from 211 overs, but Laird missed out bagging a duck fourth ball.

The third test at Lahore also ended in a bat dominated draw with Julien Wiener opening with Laird for the second match scoring 93.

=== 1980 Tour of England ===
After the tour to Pakistan, the Australians went to England to play the second Centenary Test match at Lord's. Laird scored 24 and 6 in a drawn match.

=== 1980–81 season ===
The long period of international cricket was broken and Laird was afforded the opportunity to return to regular Shield cricket. Kim Hughes was appointed captain of Western Australia over Rod Marsh, who refused to accept the office of vice captain, as did Marsh's friend Dennis Lillee. Bruce Laird accepted the job.

Laird played 6 matches in the 1980/81 season opening with the young star Graeme Wood, his opening partner in the Centenary Test. Wood had the better season scoring 542 runs to Laird's 209. Despite Western Australia winning the Shield that year, this poor form saw Laird dropped from the Test side and replaced by his teammate. Wood was then selected for 25 consecutive Test matches and would continue to feature in the side until 1992, scoring nine hundreds in his test career.

Laird's poor form early in the 1980-81 summer - eight Sheffield Shield innings with a top score of 39 - led to him being overlooked in favour of Graeme Wood and john Dyson. He scored a half century and century against India for WA but then tore a Achille's tendon in a club game. Ian Chappell wrote an article about the decline in Laird's form, which Chappell put down to a combination of bad luck "and a loss of confidence and belief in himself as a top level player" which Chappell felt also happened to Laird after the 1975 Ashes tour. "He seems to get edgy and frustrated and starts playing attacking shots far too early in his innings for a player of his style," wrote Chappell. "He becomes over anxious for runs and a big score... 'Stumpy' must learn the art of patience. His style demands it and it is what got him into the Australian side in the first place."

Laird missed three test series against New Zealand, India and the famous Ashes series in England in 1981. Ian Chappell had picked him in Chappell's hypothetical squad saying Laird was "a must for the team. He is a proven run getter in international cricket and a great fighter."

However although he had recovered his fitness and was playing Shield cricket again towards the end of the summer Laird was overlooked in favour of three other openers, Wood, John Dyson and Martin Kent. "It was just one of those things," he said, "I'd been dropped before so it wasn't a new experience."

Kim Hughes, who was captain of the 1981 Ashes squad, said he wanted Laird in the team (along with another West Australian overlooked, Bruce Yardley) but he did not have a say.

=== 1981–82 season ===
Australia lost the 1981 Ashes 3-1. Laird earned a recall to the test side for the home series against Pakistan, thanks to a bright start to the 1981/82 Shield season. A score of 110 not out and the continuing success of his partnership with Wood, convincing returning captain Greg Chappell to call on him again.

Laird was picked for the next twelve tests to partner Wood at the top of the batting order. They started well against Pakistan averaging 65 runs for the first wicket in the three test series, with a best of 109.

In the opening test of the summer held at the WACA Ground, Laird was one of seven Western Australians selected in the Australian Test team, alongside Wood, Kim Hughes, Rod Marsh, Bruce Yardley, Dennis Lillee and Terry Alderman.

It was in the 1981/82 World Series (ODI) Cup that Laird would score his only international century, 117 not out against the West Indies.

=== 1982 Tour of New Zealand ===
Laird was selected on the 1982 tour of New Zealand which followed at the end of the Australian summer.

He made 27 in the rain shortened first test, 38 and 39 in the second, and 12 and 31 in the third.

=== 1982 Tour of Pakistan ===
In September 1982 Laird was selected in the Australian squad to tour Pakistan. He was also made the third selector on the tour, after Rod Marsh refused to do the job (many had thought Marsh would be appointed captain but Kim Hughes got the job; Marsh declined to be a selector or vice-captain so Allan Border was appointed vice captain).

Laird played for Australian in the opening tour game, against the Patrons XI. He made 48 (putting on 91 for the first wicket with Wood) and 22. In the next tour game against the BCCP XI he made 28 and 23.

For the first ODI, Laird (43) and Wood (52) put on 104 for the first wicket, but Australia collapsed and lost the game.

In the first test Laird made 32 - putting on 71 with John Dyson - and 3. In the second test he scored 6 and 60 but Australia still lost. In the second ODI Laird batted throughout Australia's innings to make 91 not out but could not accerlate his scoring towards the end and Australia were 28 runs short.

For the third test Laird made 28 (putting on 85 with Wood for the first wicket) and 6, giving him 137 runs for the series at 22.83. Laird missed the last ODI as he returned to Australia early due to complications his wife was having with the birth of their third child.

Larid ended his 21 Test career having never scored an official Test century, with the three he scored in the Supertests never being officially recognised. Of the players who haven't scored a Test century, Laird has scored more runs than any other Australian opener and has the highest batting average amongst players with more than 1000 Test runs or more than twenty innings batted.

=== 1982–83 season ===
Laird scored 99 against Victoria in an early Shield game but was dropped from the Australian time for the first test, with the selectors choosing Graeme Wood and John Dyson. "Naturally I'm disappointed but there is only one way to prove the selectors wrong and that is out in the middle," said Laird. Wood was dropped after the first test but was replaced by Kepler Wessels - now eligible to play for Australia. Wessels and Dyson were the openers for the rest of the Ashes.

Laird had a strong domestic season, scoring 610 runs (ave. 40.66) and Western Australia won the Shield in the final against New South Wales. Western Australia completed the double winning the MacDonalds Cup against New South Wales by four wickets. However he was unable to get back in the national side.

=== 1983–84 season ===
In 1983/84, Laird spent most of the season batting at five. Laird smashed 684 runs at 48.85 and captained Western Australia for the first time in Shield cricket against South Australia at Perth.

Bruce Laird bowed out of professional cricket by winning another Shield title defeating Queensland in the 1983/84 final, finishing with scores 63 and 54 as Western Australia won by four wickets. Laird's performance was crucial as WA were 3-105 when Laird and Geoff Marsh combined to put on 139 in 164 minutes.

== Career Appraisal ==
Shane Warne once listed Bruce Laird in his "Backyard Australian XII" saying he had "Pure guts. Laird was a hero because of his no-nonsense technique and great courage."

== Personal life ==
Laird was married with two children. For much of his career he was a professional sportsman but when overlooked for the 1981 Ashes he went looking for work and got employment as a car salesman.
