= Eddie Barlow =

South African cricketer (1940–2005)

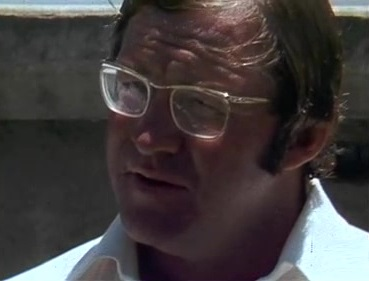
- Barlow in 1977

Personal information
- Born: 12 August 1940; Pretoria, Transvaal
- Died: 30 December 2005 (aged 65); Jersey
- Batting: Right-handed
- Bowling: Right-arm medium

International information
- National side: South Africa
- Test debut (cap 205): 8 December 1961 v New Zealand
- Last Test: 10 March 1970 v Australia

Career statistics
Competition	Test	FC	LA
Matches	30	283	99
Runs scored	2,516	18,212	2,983
Batting average	45.74	39.16	31.73
100s/50s	6/15	43/86	3/22
Top score	201	217	186
Balls bowled	3,021	31,930	5,010
Wickets	40	571	161
Bowling average	34.05	24.14	18.08
5 wickets in innings	1	16	2
10 wickets in match	0	2	0
Best bowling	5/85	7/24	6/33
Catches/stumpings	35/–	335/–	43/–
- Source: CricketArchive, 3 December 2020

Edgar John Barlow (12 August 1940 – 30 December 2005) was a South African cricketer (an all rounder). Barlow was born in Pretoria, Transvaal, South Africa, and played first-class cricket for Transvaal and Eastern Province from 1959–60 to 1967–68 before moving to Western Province for the seasons from 1968–69 to 1980–81. During this time he also played three seasons with Derbyshire in the English County Championship from 1976 – 1978. He completed his first-class career in Boland in 1982–83. Barlow was named as one of the six South African Cricket Annual players of the year in 1962.

The bespectacled Barlow was both a popular and easily recognisable figure in South African cricket from the 1960s onwards. A prodigious run-maker and frequent wicket-taker, he was one of the leading all-rounders on the world stage in the 1960s. According to Louis Duffus, Barlow "did more than anyone else to break down the timid defensive tactics which for so many years kept South Africa a second-rate cricket country".

He was nicknamed "Bunter" because of his supposed resemblance to Billy Bunter. A stand at Newlands Cricket Ground was to have been named after Barlow but due to opposition from some of the voting clubs it has been "put on hold".

== Early life and career ==
Barlow was educated at Pretoria Boys High School and the University of the Witwatersrand and played cricket for the South African Schools XI and South African Universities. He made his first-class debut for Transvaal B against Griqualand West in 1959–60, scoring 72 batting at number four and not bowling.

He began bowling in first-class matches in 1960–61 when he was promoted to the main Transvaal side. He hit his first century that season, 110 not out against North-Eastern Transvaal in the final match of the season, a match in which he also took five wickets.

He toured England with the young Fezelas team in 1961; he was a last-minute replacement for David Pithey, who had had to withdraw. Opening the batting for the first time, Barlow hit 36, 22 and 110 in his two first-class matches.

== Test career ==
Barlow played 30 Tests for South Africa, never missing a match between his debut in the First Test against New Zealand in 1961–62 and South Africa's isolation after the series against Australia in 1969–70. In 1963–64 he became the first South African player to make a century in his first Test match against Australia. He scored 603 runs in the series including a double century at Adelaide.

During England's 1964–65 tour of South Africa, Barlow became embroiled in controversy in the third Test at Newlands after he survived a bat-pad chance when England bowler Fred Titmus thought he had had Barlow caught by Peter Parfitt in the gully. It was already an ill-tempered series, and when Barlow went on to complete his hundred it was little recognised by the England players. Instead, when Tony Pithey reached his half-century shortly afterwards, the England players went overboard in their congratulations to him, seemingly to make a point about Barlow's behaviour. The local South African papers attacked England for this, and later in the same match, English batsman Ken Barrington caused a greater furore when he walked despite not being given out by the same umpire that had not given Barlow out.

In addition to his 30 official Tests, Barlow also played in 5 matches for the Rest of the World side that toured England in 1970 that were originally designated as Test matches, though they were later stripped of Test status. In the fourth of these "Tests" at Headingley he achieved what was then the 17th hat-trick; after a further dot ball, Barlow took another wicket to make it four wickets in five balls. Barlow finished with first-innings figures of 7 for 64, which would have been his best Test figures, and match figures of 12 for 142, which would have been his only 10-wicket Test match haul.

Barlow's last official Test series was South Africa's 4–0 whitewashing of Australia in 1969–70. He was selected for the tours of England in 1970 and Australia in 1971–72, but both tours were cancelled in the face of anti-apartheid protests.

== World Series Cricket ==
When Kerry Packer began his World Series Cricket tournament in 1977–78, it gave a new avenue for the leading South African cricketers to play international cricket. Barlow was signed up for both the 1977–78 and 1978–79 seasons in which the tournament ran, and captained the WSC Cavaliers side which played in many non-SuperTest matches.

== Derbyshire ==
In 1976 Eddie went to Derbyshire as the overseas professional and took over the captaincy halfway through his first season. His methods were revolutionary for the times, but he took the team to a final in the Benson & Hedges Cup at Lord's in the 1978 season.

== Post-retirement ==
After his retirement, Barlow became more active in espousing his liberal views against the apartheid policy then in place in his homeland. He had already stood for the liberal Progressive Federal Party at a parliamentary election for the Simonstown seat in 1980, losing by only 1000 votes.

Barlow took up a post as Director of the South African Sports Office in London and afterwards he became a cricket coach. He was appointed coach at Gloucestershire but due to his father's death, he had to leave after two seasons. He coached Orange Free State and then Transvaal. He then became the first coach of the newly formed Super Juice Academy which was based in the Western Cape and was a feeder for Western Province and Boland cricket.

In 1996 he acquired a wine farm in the Robertson region of the Western Cape which he named "Windfall" because he and his wife considered they bought it at a good price. From concentrating on that, he was lured back to Griqualand West to coach at Kimberley. He was then invited to become the national coach of Bangladesh in 1999 and helped put together the plans that enabled the country to achieve official Test status the following year.

In 2000 he suffered a stroke in Bangladesh which put him initially in intensive care and then a wheelchair. He was forced to sell the wine farm in 2001 to pay for medical bills that his insurer refused to pay. Later he moved to North Wales, where he continued to coach locally at Marchwiel & Wrexham and also NE Wales Development squads. He was also involved with disabled cricket in Wales. Though he was not (as often erroneously stated) a full-time wheelchair user, he could only walk very slowly, so it was easier to get from A to B in the wheelchair, and for the days when he coached he used an electric scooter which was provided for him by the PCA. He died after a brain haemorrhage in Jersey on 30 December 2005, leaving his third wife a widow.

Sporting positions
Preceded by Bob Taylor	Derbyshire cricket captains 1976–1978	Succeeded by Geoff Miller
