= Wayne Daniel =

West Indian cricketer

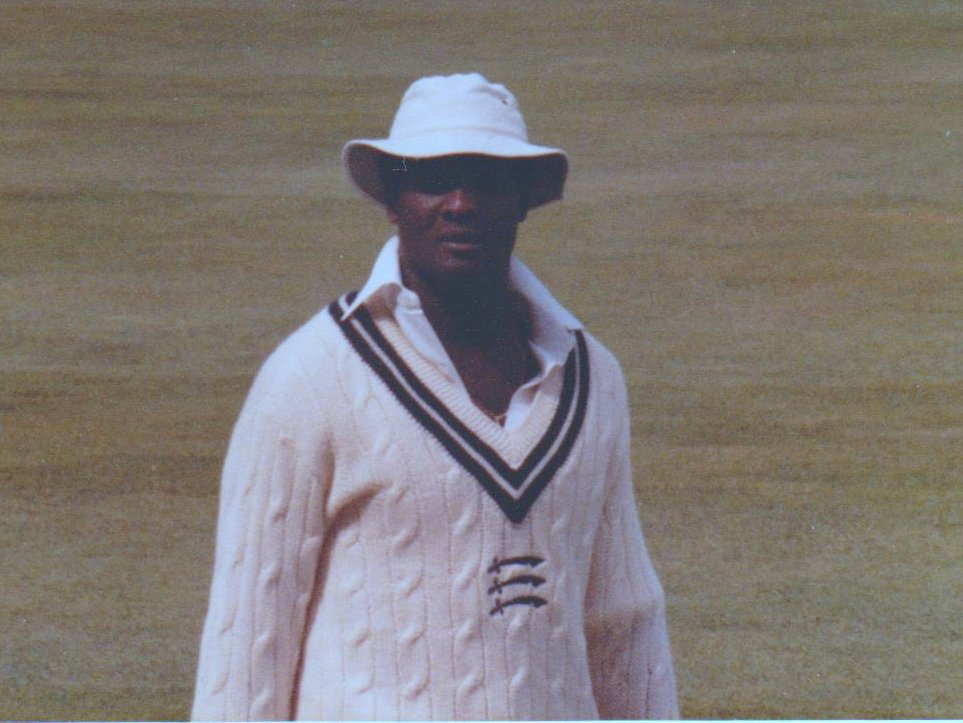
- Wayne Daniel at Lord's in 1982, in Middlesex CCC colours.

Personal information
- Full name: Wayne Wendell Daniel
- Born: 16 January 1956 (age 70); Saint Philip, Barbados
- Nickname: Diamond
- Batting: Right-handed
- Bowling: Right-arm fast
- Role: Bowler

International information
- National side: West Indies (1976–1984)
- Test debut (cap 156): 21 April 1976 v India
- Last Test: 16 March 1984 v Australia
- ODI debut (cap 24): 22 February 1978 v Australia
- Last ODI: 14 March 1984 v Australia

Domestic team information
- Years: Team
- 1975/76–1983/84: Barbados
- 1977–1988: Middlesex
- 1981/82: Western Australia

Career statistics
Competition	Test	ODI	FC	LA
Matches	10	18	266	241
Runs scored	46	49	1,551	319
Batting average	6.57	49.00	11.48	6.13
100s/50s	0/0	0/0	0/2	0/0
Top score	11	16*	53*	34
Balls bowled	1,754	912	38,311	11,511
Wickets	36	23	867	362
Bowling average	25.27	25.86	22.47	18.16
5 wickets in innings	1	0	31	6
10 wickets in match	0	0	7	0
Best bowling	5/39	3/27	9/61	7/12
Catches/stumpings	4/–	5/–	63/–	36/–
Medal record
Men's Cricket
Representing West Indies
ICC Cricket World Cup
Runner-up	1983 England and Wales
- Source: CricketArchive, 12 August 2012

Wayne Wendell Daniel (born 16 January 1956) is a Barbadian former cricketer, who played as a right arm fast bowler. Daniel featured for the West Indies, Middlesex, Barbados and Western Australia in his cricketing career. He was the first person to hit a six and take a wicket on the last ball of his test career. He was a part of the West Indian squad which finished as runners-up at the 1983 Cricket World Cup.

== Cricket career ==
Born in St Phillip, Barbados, Daniel picked up cricket at a young age. Evolving into a hostile and muscular fast bowler, Daniel first toured England with the West Indies schoolboys team in 1974 and Middlesex's Second XI in 1975. After such he made his first-class debut for Barbados in 1975/76. Daniel, in partnership with fellow fast bowlers Michael Holding and Andy Roberts, contributed greatly to the defeat of England in 1976.

Nicknamed "Diamond" or "Black Diamond", in 1977, Daniel accepted an offer to play in World Series Cricket, which kept him out of Test cricket for two years. Although Holding and Roberts resumed their Test careers after World Series Cricket, Daniel was less fortunate, as Malcolm Marshall, Colin Croft, Joel Garner and later Courtney Walsh came to the fore in his place. Daniel found himself left out of the national team and forced to carve out a successful first-class career with Middlesex between 1977 and 1988, gaining his county cap in 1977 and awarded a benefit in 1985. He took 867 wickets at an average of just 22.47 with a best of 9 for 61 against Glamorgan in 1982. He also took another 362 wickets at an average of 18.16 in 241 one day games, including a then English domestic one day bowling record of seven wickets for twelve runs, for Middlesex against Minor Counties East at Ipswich. He helped Middlesex to win the County Championship outright in 1980, 1982 and 1985, and to share it with Kent in 1977, and to win the Gillette Cup in 1977 and 1980, the Benson & Hedges Cup in 1983 and 1986, and the 1984 NatWest Trophy. Daniel also played for Western Australia in the Sheffield Shield 1981–82 season and for his native Barbados between 1976 and 1985.

== Style of play ==
Daniel's run up was idiosyncratic but he bowled with a strong action, bending his back and then following through halfway down the pitch to deliver 'heavy' balls which hit the batsman's splice or ribs. His long run up also meant that during John Player League matches, which limited bowlers' run-ups, Daniel ran on the spot for a while to simulate his full run-up.

== Later life ==
When his playing days came to a close, Daniel became involved in coaching along with cricket commentary.
