= Rob Langer =

Australian cricketer (1948–2023)

Personal information
- Full name: Robert Samuel Langer
- Born: 3 October 1948; Perth, Western Australia, Australia
- Died: 14 September 2023 (aged 74)
- Batting: Left-handed
- Bowling: Right-arm medium
- Relatives: Justin Langer (nephew)

Domestic team information
- Years: Team
- 1973/74–1981/82: Western Australia
- First-class debut: 19 January 1974 Western Australia v New Zealanders
- Last First-class: 26 February 1982 Western Australia v Queensland
- List A debut: 2 February 1974 Western Australia v New South Wales
- Last List A: 6 March 1982 Western Australia v Victoria

Career statistics
Competition	First-class	List A
Matches	44	15
Runs scored	2,756	338
Batting average	43.06	28.16
100s/50s	5/18	0/1
Top score	150*	99*
Balls bowled	448	80
Wickets	5	2
Bowling average	39.00	25.00
5 wickets in innings	0	0
10 wickets in match	0	0
Best bowling	1/14	2/18
Catches/stumpings	19/–	6/–
- Source: CricketArchive, 16 December 2009

Robert Samuel Langer (3 October 1948 – 14 September 2023) was an Australian cricketer who played for Western Australia in the 1970s and 1980s. He was a left-handed middle order batsman and occasional right-arm medium pace bowler. Langer's first-class career extended from 1973–1974 until 1981–1982. He made 2,756 first-class runs in 44 matches at an average of 43.06 with a highest score of 150 not out. In 15 limited overs matches, his best score was 99 not out with a total of 338 runs at an average of 28.16. Langer scored five first-class hundreds and 18 half-centuries during his career.

Langer was never selected for the official Australian team. However, in 1977 he signed to play World Series Cricket for the WSC Australian team and spent the 1977–78 and 1978–79 seasons with WSC. He won three Sheffield Shield championships (1974–75, 1976–77 and 1980–81) and two One-Day Cup titles (1973–74 and 1976–77) with Western Australia.

Langer was the uncle of Justin Langer, former Australian Test batsman and Somerset County Cricket Club captain.

== Career ==
Langer did national service in the early 1970s. During that time he played district cricket for South Melbourne.

Langer made his first class debut in 1973–74 for Western Australia against New Zealand, scoring 42 and 20.

Longer began the 1974–75 season well with 41 not out and 66 against South Australia and 62 against the touring English side. Towards the end of the 1974–75 season, he scored his maiden first class century, 150 against Victoria, in just his sixth first class game. He then made 72 against NSW. Some journalists said he was a possibility for the 1975 Ashes tour but he was not picked.

In 1975–76 Langer scored 111 and 64 against NSW but was outshone by Kim Hughes' century in the latter's first class debut. He made 91 and 76 against the touring West Indians. There was instability in the Australian team that summer; Langer was discussed as a test prospect but the selectors eventually went with Graham Yallop and Gary Cosier as the new batters in the side.

Langer performed well during the 1976–77 season, including 55 and 76 against New South Wales, 77 against Victoria, 87 against Pakistan (again overshone by Kim Hughes who made 137), 52 against Victoria, 71 vs NSW and 83 against the touring English.

In early December 1976 Ian Chappell said Langer should be picked in the Australian side to play Pakistan over other batters such as Yallop and Cosier, as well as emerging talents like Martin Kent and Kim Hughes, because he was more consistent. However the selectors decided to persist with Cosier, while Kim Hughes was selected as the back up batter on the 1976-77 tour of New Zealand.

In January 1977 Ian Chappell picked Langer for his hypothetical squad to tour England in 1977, stating that:

Langer impresses me because he has proven himself as a consistent batsmen over the past few years. I've always believed that it takes 3–4 years to prove yourself as a Shield batsman, and Langer has achieved that. He is more of a grafting batsman than any of his rivals and that should definitely count in his favour, given the current state of Australian batting. He probably doesn't have as much natural ability as some others around, but he has proved that he can make best use of what he has got. He's prepared to work hard, and has tightened his game a lot since he came into first class cricket. His ability to get his head down and his tight defence will both be strong assets in England.

However Australian selectors overlooked Langer again in favour of Hughes, Craig Serjeant, and David Hookes.

=== World Series Cricket ===
When World Series Cricket was announced, Langer was considered a likely candidate for Australian selection. Ray Robinson included him in Robinson's "preferred 12" for the first test against India calling him "the most consistent fringe batsman" over the last two summers, pointing out he was the only batter apart from Greg Chappell who passed 50 a dozen times in that period.

In October 1977 Langer signed to play with World Series Cricket for three years at a total of $75,000. He said he considered the offer for almost three weeks before deciding.

In December 1977 Langer scored 90 for WSC Australia against WSC World in a game at Mildura. He was selected to play for Australia in the third WSC international, at Adelaide, replacing David Hookes, who had been injured in the second game. Playing against the West Indies, Langer scored 45 in the first innings, taking part in a partnership of 89 with Greg Chappell, and 8 in the second. In the next game he scored 39 and 12 against the World XI. Langer was dropped for the next game in favour of Ross Edwards.

=== Return to first-class cricket ===
Langer was omitted from the WA team at the start of the 1979-80 summer. He was recalled as a replacement for Colin Penter in a game against the touring West Indies. He scored 137. He later made 102 against Queensland. However he was not able to force his way into the Australian side.

Langer was dropped from Western Australia in 1980–81 but forced his way back into the team. He made 84 against the touring Indians.

In November 1981 Langer was recalled to the state side to replace Mark O'Neill, who had been dropped. He made 77 against NSW, taking part in a 188 run partnership with Kim Hughes. He later scored 140 against Queensland, and 75 against Tasmania. He also scored 99 not out (being dropped six times and escaping a run out) in a McDonald's Cup game against Tasmania, winning the man of the match award. Langer retired from first class cricket at the end of the season.

== Retirement ==
After retiring from cricket, Langer went on to be chief executive officer of the Western Australian Speedway Commission from 1999 until 2001, whereupon he became a Senior Consultant.

In June 2002, Langer was appointed High Performance Manager for the Western Australian Cricket Association.

Rob Langer died on 14 September 2023, at the age of 74.
