= Gloucester Park, Perth =

Harness racing venue in Perth, Western Australia

Gloucester Park
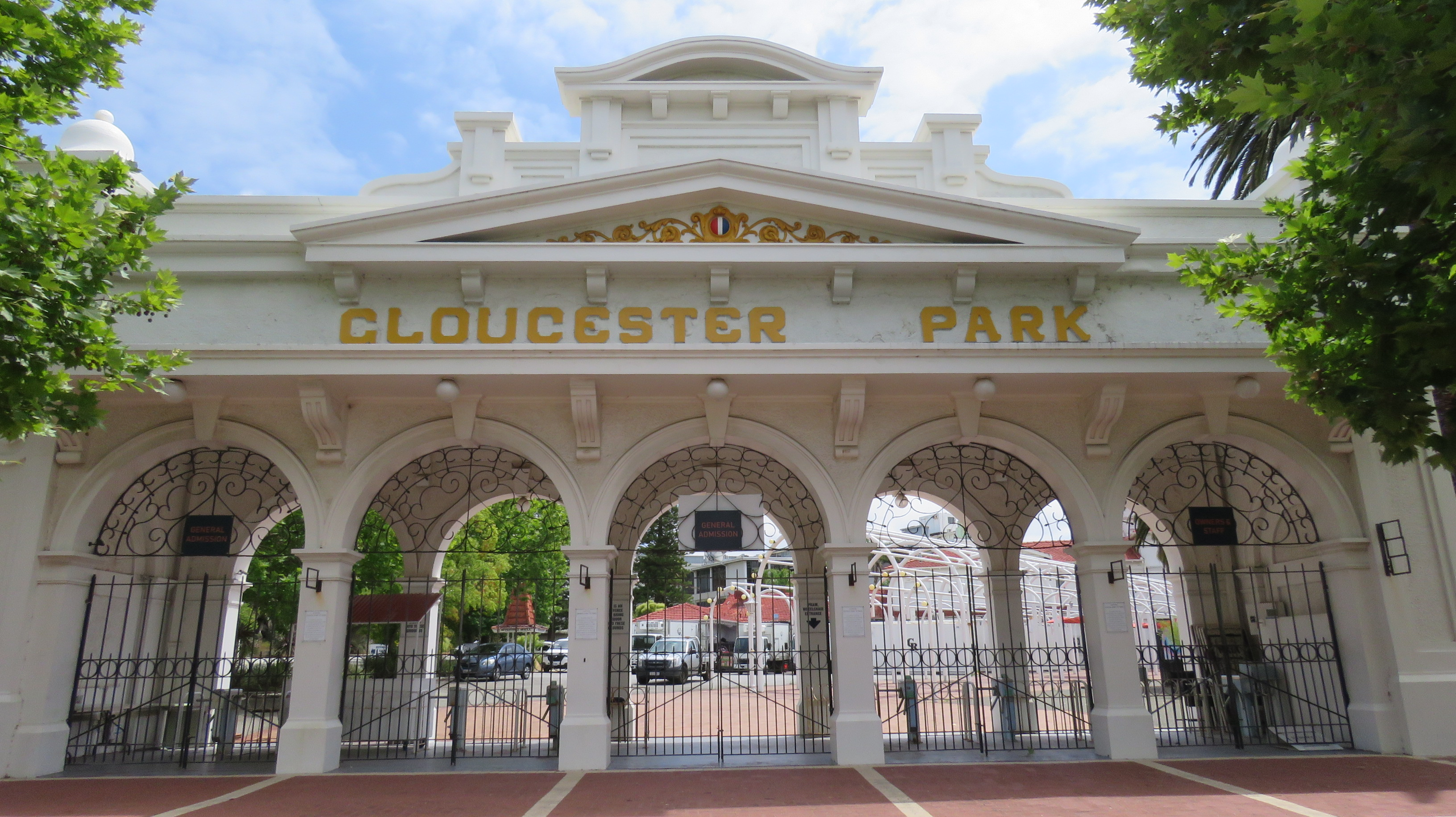
- Entrance to Gloucester Park, located at the southern side of the perimeter
- Interactive map of the Gloucester Park area
- Former names: Brennan Park
- Alternative names: Gloucester Park Trotting Ground

General information
- Type: Harness racing course
- Location: Perth, Western Australia
- Coordinates: 31°57′24″S 115°52′56″E

Western Australia Heritage Register
- Type: State Registered Place
- Reference no.: 2170

Gloucester Park is a harness racing course in Perth, Western Australia. In the suburb of East Perth, the oval course is adjacent to the WACA Ground. The track is lit, and Friday night pacing events are popular. As of 2006 the Western Australian Trotting Association have used Gloucester Park for more than 70 years, starting with the first Inter Dominion Championship held in February 1936. Gloucester Park has also been used for Telstra Rally Australia. Between 1977 and 1979 Gloucester Park was used as a venue for World Series Cricket matches. Between September 2015 and April 2017, the drop-in wickets for Optus Stadium were built and maintained in the centre of Gloucester Park.

Gloucester Park holds social and historical qualities and was interim listed in the State Register of Heritage Places in 2003.

In the early 1980s, East Perth Redevelopment Authority (EPRA) coordinated the East Perth Redevelopment Project in which parts of Gloucester Park went through modifications.

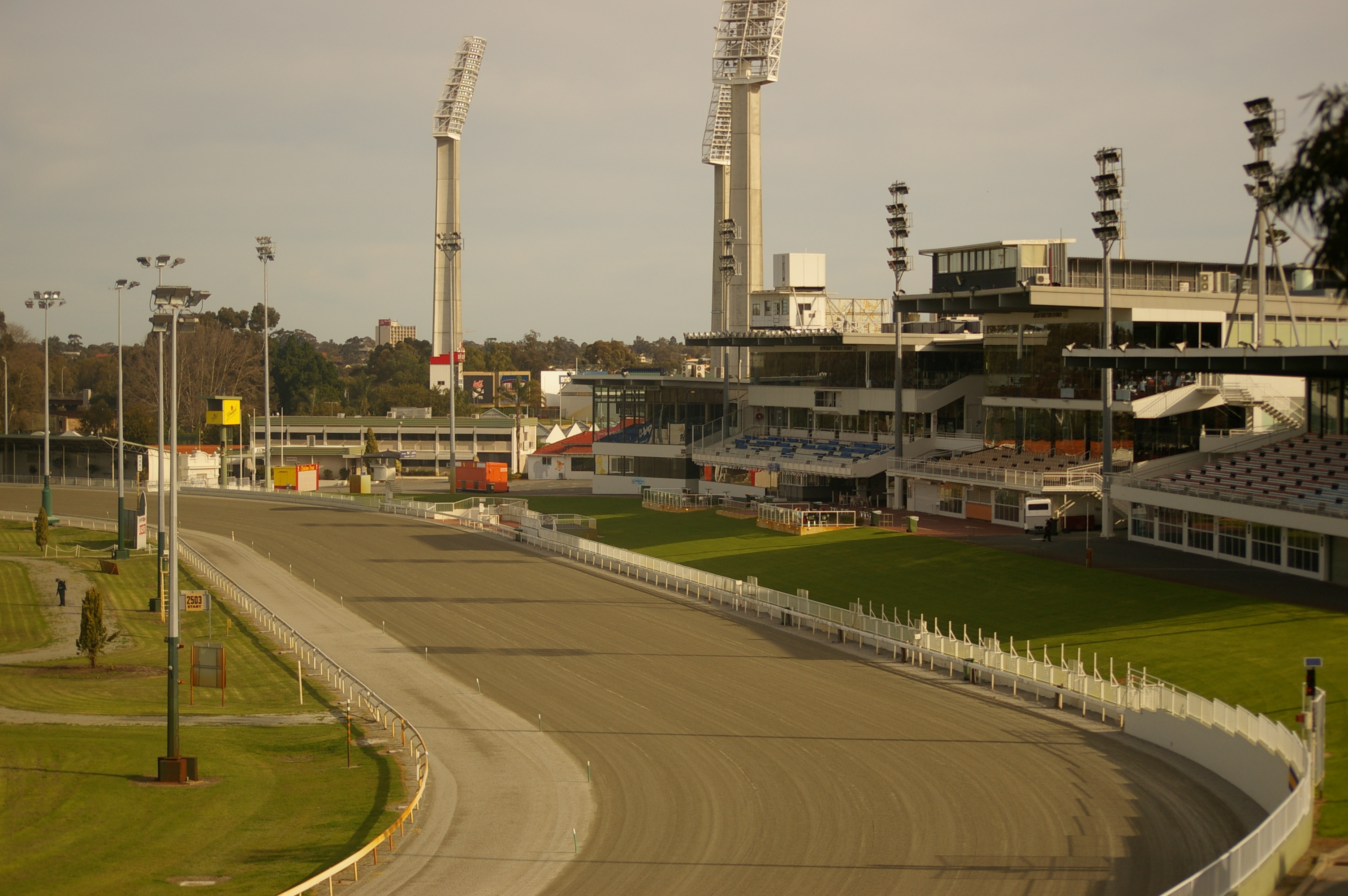
Grandstands, track and finish line. The floodlights surrounding the WACA Ground are visible in the background.

== Sporting activities ==
Gloucester Park was used as a venue for several sporting events and its track has been changed multiple times to accommodate different sporting activities such as harness racing, cricket, and automobile rallies.

=== Harness racing ===
Gloucester Park is the oldest and only remaining harness racing ground in Perth. The development of the park has been controlled by the Western Australian Trotting Association (WATA) for over 70 years.

The venue opened as Brennan Park in 1929 in honour of WATA president James Brennan. The WATA committee chose to rename the park Gloucester Park in 1935 to honour Prince Henry, Duke of Gloucester.

The first Inter Dominion Pacing Championship series was held at Gloucester Park in February 1936. When Perth was chosen to host the Inter Dominion championship for 2015–16 to 2017–18, Gloucester Park became the venue for two Inter Dominion heats on 27 November and 4 December 2015 and the Inter Dominion championship grand final on 13 December 2015. Gloucester Park Harness Racing and Racing and Wagering Western Australia secured the pacing series event for the next three years. On 25 November and 2 December 2016, two Inter Dominion heats was held in Gloucester Park, with grand final on 9 December 2016. The following year Gloucester Park became the venue for another Inter Dominion heat on 24 November 2017.

=== Automobile rally ===
On 1 July 2003, Tourism Minister Bob Kucera confirmed that Gloucester Park would be the new venue for the 2003 Telstra Rally Australia. The headquarters of Telstra Rally Australia would also be located at the Super Special Stage at Gloucester Park during the event. The idea of moving the rally to Gloucester park was introduced after concerns were raised surrounding the prediction of poor weather events at Langley Park, the venue of Super Special Stages for the past 11 years. Gloucester Park was also chosen as the venue of choice due to its strategic area and facilities. Prior to the confirmation of the venue change, there were also issues regarding how the rally may degrade the quality of the trotting track. Race organisers, engineers, and experts were involved in developing a track design that would not affect the quality of the trotting track. In June, Telstra Rally Australia gained its support from the Western Australian Trotting Association, and its permission to use Gloucester Park is approved by the East Perth Redevelopment Authority and the City of Perth.

=== Cricket ===
The World Series Cricket match took place in Gloucester Park between 1977 and 1979. Instead of holding their event in major Australian cricket grounds, Kerry Packer and his organization decided on renting a non-cricket stadium; Gloucester Park was chosen as the stadium for the Perth venue. Other non-cricket stadium includes the Melbourne's Waverley Park, the Sydney Showground Stadium, and Adelaide's Football Park. However, since Gloucester Park is a trotting ground, it does not have the standard grass pitches compatible for a top-class match. Artificially-prepared pitches were transported to Gloucester Park in order to accommodate to the situation.

== Heritage listing ==
On 9 May 2003, Gloucester Park was interim listed in the State Register of Heritage Places. The park was recognised for its social and historical qualities. Environment and Heritage Minister Judy Edwards acknowledged the park's high level of authenticity as the oldest and only remaining harness racing track in Perth. The Minister also said that "Gloucester Park has been a major venue for social gathering in Perth since 1929 and is highly valued by the Western Australia Trotting Association and members of the wider public for the past 70 years" and "contributes to the community's sense of place". Gloucester park's historical character is also defined by its main entrance and infrastructure, which lost some of its qualities such as the original stands and tearoom, due to the East Perth Redevelopment Project in 1980.

== Planning and developments ==
=== Developments from 1980-2010 ===
The East Perth Redevelopment Project, coordinated by the East Perth Redevelopment Authority (EPRA), was first introduced in the early 1980s with the goal of improving the urban environment and access to affordable housing. During the planning of the East Perth Redevelopment Project in 1999, EPRA's site assessment for Gloucester Park stated how 12 hectares (30 acres) of land would potentially be redeveloped for the construction of residential lots.

The reconstruction of the East Perth Gateway, one of the features of the East Perth Redevelopment Project, impacted parts of the Gloucester Park Trotting Ground. The construction of the East Perth Gateway would deliver approximately 2,500 new residences and 20,000 square metres (220,000 sq ft) of office and commercial floorspace. This project would take up more than 40 hectares (99 acres) of land comprising parts of Gloucester Park and other parts of East Perth including Queens Gardens and Trinity College. Gloucester Park was added to the interim register as one of the buildings of cultural heritage significance that would be re-used and included adjustively into the Gateway redevelopment proposals. On 22 November 2002, the East Perth Gateway received around 200 written submissions, 40 electronic submissions, and continuous public support from communities of Perth that are in favour of the urban renewal project.

The redevelopment site expands throughout parts of Gloucester Park, however the sale of park land, commenced in 2004–2005, is subject to decisions made by the owner and developer of the land, the Western Australian Trotting Association, with EPRA as the planning control agency. In 2008, the Western Australian Trotting Association submitted its proposal to extend the track of Gloucester Park to the 2004 Riverside Masterplan (formerly known as the Gateway Masterplan). Moreover, the association approved of putting residential buildings on the fringes of Gloucester Park. A greenbelt that runs along the Swan river, connecting Gloucester Park with Victoria Gardens, was also established to utilize land for more public open space, which is another feature of the East Perth Redevelopment Project.

=== Developments since 2010 ===
In 2014, the state government expressed interest in building a new pedestrian bridge across Swan River, widely known as the Matagarup Bridge, to connect Burswood Peninsula to East Perth, adjacent to Gloucester Park. The Minister said that the new bridge aims to move cyclist and pedestrians from the Causeway bridge, increase practicality in moving people around on major event days, as well as uniting fans of sports together considering its strategic location near the Perth Stadium and Gloucester Park. The Minister also said that the construction of the bridge were being managed with great caution to diminish impacts to the visitors of Gloucester Park and the areas around.

In August 2014, the Optus Stadium project team decided to design drop-in cricket wickets in Gloucester Park. In September 2015 up to February 2016, a prototype of the drop-in wickets were installed and tested by the state cricket players to ensure its quality under match requirements. An additional four drop-in wickets were installed in May 2016. The drop-in cricket wickets were then transported to Optus Stadium the following year.
