= Barry Richards =

South African Test cricketer

Personal information
- Full name: Barry Anderson Richards
- Born: 21 July 1945 (age 81); Durban, Natal Province, Union of South Africa
- Batting: Right-handed
- Bowling: Right arm off break
- Role: Batsman

International information
- National side: South Africa
- Test debut (cap 234): 22 January 1970 v Australia
- Last Test: 5 March 1970 v Australia

Domestic team information
- Years: Team
- 1964/65–1982/83: Natal
- 1965: Gloucestershire
- 1968–1978: Hampshire
- 1970/71: South Australia

Career statistics
Competition	Test	FC	LA
Matches	4	339	233
Runs scored	508	28,358	8,506
Batting average	72.57	54.74	40.12
100s/50s	2/2	80/152	16/50
Top score	140	356	155*
Balls bowled	72	6,126	270
Wickets	1	77	7
Bowling average	26.00	37.48	26.42
5 wickets in innings	0	1	0
10 wickets in match	0	0	0
Best bowling	1/12	7/63	2/8
Catches/stumpings	3/–	367/–	106/–
- Source: Cricinfo, 21 March 2008

Barry Anderson Richards (born 21 July 1945) is a former South African first-class cricketer. A right-handed "talent of such enormous stature", Richards is considered one of South Africa's most successful batsmen. He was able to play only four Test matches – all against Australia – before South Africa's exclusion from the international scene in 1970. In that brief career, against a competitive Australian attack, Richards scored 508 runs at the high average of 72.57. Richards' contribution in that series was instrumental in the 4–0 win that South Africa inflicted on the side, captained by Bill Lawry. His first century, 140, was scored in conjunction with Graeme Pollock's 274 in a famous 103-run partnership. Mike Procter, whose South African and English career roughly paralleled that of Richards, was prominent in that series as a bowler.

When the apartheid South African Government allowed for non-whites to play cricket with whites in 1974, Richards suggested that only one member of the side should be black, and the rest white. A sarcastic comment implying that the then selectors would just include one token black player to comply with the new regulations.

With such limited international exposure, Richards plied his trade in first-class cricket between 1964 and 1983, becoming a prolific batsman with 28,358 runs. He scored 80 centuries, including a best of 356, at an overall average of 54.74. He also scored 8,506 one day runs, with 16 further centuries. Wisden Cricketer of the Year for 1969, Richards scored runs for Gloucestershire, Hampshire, Natal, South Australia, Transvaal and in World Series Cricket, and has been described as "one of the finest talents of the 20th century", and it is jokingly said that "the merest suggestion that he does not belong among the definitive all-time greats will spark violence in most bars in South Africa."

In 2009, Richards was inducted into the ICC Cricket Hall of Fame.

== Early life ==
Richards was born in Durban, Natal Province, Union of South Africa and attended Clifton School (Durban) and the Durban High School and for many years played club cricket for DHS Old Boys' Club. He played in the Natal Nuffield week side from 1961 to 1964, and for South African schools from 1962 to 1964, scoring a century against the Western Province first-class team. The national selectors had their eyes on him early, and he played for a South African Colts XI against the touring MCC side in 1964–65, scoring 63, and later in the tour for an Invitation XI. When the Australians toured in 1966–67, he scored 107 in 160 minutes for a strong South African XI against them before the First Test, but despite several failures by the top-order batsmen in the Test series, he was unable to break into the national side.

== County cricket ==
Richards was a prolific scorer in county cricket for many years for Hampshire. He scored 2395 runs in his first season, 1968, more than anybody else in the country. From 1970, Richards established one of the most successful opening partnerships for that county, along with West Indian batsman Gordon Greenidge.

Among his other achievements was scoring 155 not out in a score of 215–3 off 40 overs in the John Player League for Hampshire against Yorkshire County Cricket Club at Hull on 7 June 1970. This achievement was put into further perspective when Yorkshire replied with 74–9 off their 40 overs.

== Sheffield Shield ==
In 1970–71, as an overseas player for South Australia, Richards scored 325 runs in a single day against Western Australia off an attack that included Dennis Lillee, Graham McKenzie, Tony Lock and Tony Mann. In that season he hit 1538 runs in 10 matches at an average of 109.8.

== Currie Cup/SuperSport Series ==
Returning home to play for Natal in the next 4 seasons, he scored heavily in the Currie Cup, 1089 runs in (1971–72), 1064 runs in (1972–73), 898 runs in (1973–74) and 868 runs in (1975–76). Richards is the only player to have scored 1,000 runs in a Currie Cup season, each season consisting of only 8 matches.

== Other international ventures ==
He did have the opportunity for international cricket in World Series Cricket in the summers of 1977–78 and 1978–79 in Australia playing 5 Supertests for the World XI scoring 554 runs in 5 matches. This included two centuries including 207 scored v WSC Australia on 27 January 1978 at Gloucester Park, Perth.

In South Africa, Richards was Player of the Year in 1968. He also played for South Africa in 6 unofficial "Tests", captaining the team twice. In 1984 he came out of retirement to play against the rebel West Indian touring team in South Africa. Trevor Bisseker wrote this:

"Playing at Newlands, he held the stadium enthralled for an hour, as he simply carved up everything that was delivered at him. He played with all the time in the world and the decisive quality of a master craftsman at work. Alas the spell was broken. His concentration seem to snap and the inevitable end came. That innings put Richards into his right perspective. He was the closest thing to an insurance policy against defeat that anybody could take out. Certainly, if somebody had to bat for one's life, one would choose Richards ahead of the other world greats of the 1970s, and that includes his illustrious West Indian namesake and Graeme Pollock."

== Later life and career ==
For a number of seasons he commentated for the South African Broadcasting Corporation as well as South Africa's MNet SuperSport, before parting ways after a dispute. He has also commentated in the UK for Test Match Special, Channel 4 and Five.

Richards was chosen by Dickie Bird in his autobiography as a member of his Dream team, from all players he ever saw. Richards was also chosen by Sir Don Bradman as a member of his 20th century team as an opening batsman.
