= 1978–79 Gillette Cup (Australia) =

- Administrator: Australian Cricket Board
- Cricket format: Limited overs cricket
- Tournament format: knockout
- Champions: Tasmania (1st title)
- Participants: 6
- Matches: 5, plus final
- Most runs: Gary Goodman (Tas) 130 runs

The 1978–79 Gillette Cup was the tenth season of official List A domestic cricket in Australia. Six teams representing six states in Australia took part in the competition. The competition began on 28 October 1978 when Queensland took on South Australia at the Gabba in Brisbane.

The 1978–79 Cup Final was played on 14 January 1979 at the TCA Ground in Hobart between Western Australia and Tasmania, who had been the finalists in the previous season as well. In a reversal of the previous season's result, Tasmania caused a major upset to win their first-ever domestic title by beating Western Australia by 47 runs.

== Teams ==
Club	Home Ground	Captain
New South Wales	Sydney Cricket Ground	Andrew Hilditch
Queensland	Brisbane Cricket Ground	John MacLean
South Australia	Adelaide Oval	Bob Blewett
Tasmania	TCA Ground	Jack Simmons
Victoria	Melbourne Cricket Ground	Graham Yallop
Western Australia	WACA Ground	John Inverarity

== Format ==
The 1978–79 Gillette Cup was not played in the round-robin format that would become popular in later seasons. Instead, the two finalists from the previous season, Western Australia (winners) and Tasmania (runners-up) progressed automatically to the semi-finals, whilst the four remaining states were randomly allocated an opponent in a knockout match.

First Round
28 October – Brisbane
South Australia	101allout
Queensland	2/105
Tasmania
BYE
29 October – Sydney
New South Wales	6/156
Victoria	5/157
Western Australia
BYE

Semi-finals
10 December – Brisbane
Queensland	6/232
Tasmania	9/236
23 December – Perth
Western Australia	6/215
Victoria	7/214

Final
14 January – Hobart
Tasmania	6/180
Western Australia	133allout

== Fixtures ==
=== Knock-out round ===
28 October

South Australia; 101 all out (36.4 overs)	v	Queensland; 2/105 (32.2 overs)
Barry Causby 34 (45); Peter Sleep 25 (52); Jeff Thomson 6/18 (10 overs)		Maxwell Walters 57* (121); Graham Winter 1/10 (3 overs)

Queensland won by 8 wickets
Brisbane Cricket Ground, Brisbane (2,065)
Umpires: JM Boyle and CE Harvey
Player of the match: Jeff Thomson

29 October

New South Wales; 6/156 (40 overs)	v	Victoria; 5/157 (39 overs)
David Johnston 48 (76); Mark Clews 29 (47); Paul Hibbert 1/14 (3 overs)		Graham Yallop 45 (65); Trevor Laughlin 29 (28); David Hourn 3/31 (8 overs)

Victoria won by 5 wickets
Sydney Cricket Ground, Sydney
Umpires: TF Brooks and RG Harris
Player of the match: Graham Yallop

- 40 overs per side due to late start.

=== Semi-finals ===
10 December

Queensland; 6/232 (50 overs)	v	Tasmania; 9/236 (49.5 overs)
David Ogilvie 82 (85); John Buchanan 64 (123); Garry Cowmeadow 2/37 (10 overs)		Gary Goodman 100 (145); John Hampshire 63 (82); Leonard Balcam 5/49 (9 overs)

Tasmania won by 1 wicket
Brisbane Cricket Ground, Brisbane (1,586)
Umpires: JM Boyle and TH Warwick
Player of the match: Gary Goodman

23 December

Western Australia; 6/215 (50 overs)	v	Victoria; 7/214 (50 overs)
Kim Hughes 69; Craig Serjeant 49; Alan Hurst 5/36 (10 overs)		Jeff Moss 76; Graham Yallop 59; Graeme Porter 2/37 (10 overs)

Western Australia won by 1 run
WACA Ground, Perth (4,372)
Umpires: PJ McConnell and DG Weser
Player of the match: Alan Hurst

=== Final ===
14 January

Tasmania; 6/180 (50 overs)	v	Western Australia; 133 all out (30.1 overs)
Jack Simmons 55 (83); Trevor Docking 46 (65); Graeme Porter 2/29 (10 overs)		Craig Serjeant 47 (78); Jack Simmons 4/17 (10 overs); Anthony Benneworth 3/14 (8.2 overs)

Tasmania won by 47 runs
TCA Ground, Hobart (10,822)
Umpires: K Connor and J Stevens
Player of the match: Jack Simmons

== Statistics ==
=== Highest Team Totals ===
Team	Total	Opponent	Ground
Tasmania	9/236	Queensland	Brisbane Cricket Ground
Queensland	6/232	Tasmania	Brisbane Cricket Ground
Western Australia	6/215	Victoria	WACA Ground
Victoria	7/214	Western Australia	WACA Ground
South Australia	101 all out	Queensland	Brisbane Cricket Ground

=== Most Runs ===
Player	Runs	Inns	Avg	100s	50s
Gary Goodman (Tasmania)	130	2	65.00	1	0
Graham Yallop (Victoria)	104	2	52.00	0	1
David Ogilvie (Queensland)	97	2	48.50	0	1
Craig Serjeant (Western Australia)	96	2	48.00	0	0
Jeff Moss (Victoria)	95	2	95.00	–	1

=== Highest Scores ===
Player	Score	Balls	Opponent	Ground	4s	6s
Gary Goodman (Tasmania)	100	145	Queensland	Brisbane Cricket Ground	11	0
David Ogilvie (Queensland)	82	85	Tasmania	Brisbane Cricket Ground	14	0
Jeff Moss (Victoria)	76		Western Australia	WACA Ground	7	0
Kim Hughes (Western Australia)	69	129	Victoria	WACA Ground	3	1
John Buchanan (Queensland)	64	123	Tasmania	Brisbane Cricket Ground	5	0

== See also ==
- Sheffield Shield season 1978-79
- Australian cricket team in 1978-79
