= Stackpole (disambiguation) =

Stackpole may refer to:

== Places ==
- Stackpole, a village in Pembrokeshire, Wales, United Kingdom
- Stackpole and Castlemartin, a community in Pembrokeshire, Wales, United Kingdom
- Stackpole Estate, a National Trust property in the above community

== People ==
- H. C. Stackpole III (1935–2020), American Marines Corps general
- Keith Stackpole (1940–2025), Australian cricketer
- Keith Stackpole (footballer) (1916–1992), Australian footballer
- Michael A. Stackpole (born 1957), American science fiction and fantasy author
- Peter Stackpole (1913–1993), American photographer
- Ralph Stackpole (1885–1973), American sculptor

== Businesses ==
- Stackpole Books, a book publishing company in Mechanicsburg, Pennsylvania, United States
- Stackpole Electronics, a resistor manufacturer is Raleigh, North Carolina, United States
