= Australian cricket team in England in 1972 =

International cricket tour

- Date: 8 June 1972 – 16 August 1972
- Location: England
- Result: Five-match series drawn 2–2 (England retained The Ashes)
Teams
- England: Australia
Captains
- Ray Illingworth: IM Chappell
Most runs
Most wickets

The Australian cricket team toured England in the 1972 season to play a five-match Test series against England for the Ashes. The series was drawn 2–2 and England retained the Ashes. This was the last drawn series until 2019. The two sides also played a three-match ODI series, which England won 2–1.

== Australian squad ==
The following squad was selected by Neil Harvey, Sam Loxton and Phil Ridings:

- Batsmen – Ian Chappell (captain), Greg Chappell, Ross Edwards, Bruce Francis, Doug Walters, Paul Sheahan, Keith Stackpole
- Wicket-keepers – Rod Marsh, Brian Taber
- Fast bowlers – Dennis Lillee, Bob Massie, David Colley, Jeff Hammond
- All-rounders – John Inverarity, Graeme Watson
- Spinners – John Gleeson, Ashley Mallett

Notable omissions from the squad included Bill Lawry, Graham McKenzie and Ian Redpath.

== Test series ==
=== 1st Test ===
8 – 13 June 1972
Scorecard

England	v	Australia
249 (120.4 overs); Tony Greig 57 (123); David Colley 3/83 (33 overs)		142 (58 overs); Keith Stackpole 53 (85); John Snow 4/41 (20 overs)
234 (86.2 overs); Tony Greig 62 (116); Dennis Lillee 6/66 (30 overs)		252 (85.2 overs); Rod Marsh 91 (111); Tony Greig 4/53 (19.2 overs)

England won by 89 runs
Old Trafford, Manchester
Umpires: Charlie Elliott (Eng) and Tom Spencer (Eng)

- England won the toss and elected to bat.
- 11 June was taken as a rest day.
- David Colley, Bruce Francis (both Aus) and Tony Greig (Eng) made their Test debuts.

=== 2nd Test ===
22 – 26 June 1972
Scorecard

England	v	Australia
272 (91.5 overs); Tony Greig 54 (117); Bob Massie 8/84 (32.5 overs)		308 (122.1 overs); Greg Chappell 131 (303); John Snow 5/57 (32 overs)
116 (55.2 overs); Mike Smith 30 (99); Bob Massie 8/53 (27.2 overs)		81/2 (26.5 overs); Keith Stackpole 57* (79); Basil D'Oliveira 1/14 (8 overs)

Australia won by 8 wickets
Lord's, London
Umpires: David Constant (Eng) and Arthur Fagg (Eng)

- England won the toss and elected to bat.
- 25 June was taken as a rest day.
- Ross Edwards and Bob Massie (both Aus) made their Test debuts.

=== 3rd Test ===
13 – 18 July 1972
Scorecard

Australia	v	England
315 (118.4 overs); Keith Stackpole 114 (255); John Snow 5/92 (31 overs)		189 (88.3 overs); John Edrich 37 (122); Dennis Lillee 4/35 (29 overs)
324/4d (92 overs); Ross Edwards 170* (290); John Snow 3/94 (24 overs)		290/4 (148 overs); Brian Luckhurst 96 (268); Dennis Lillee 2/40 (25 overs)

Match drawn
Trent Bridge, Nottingham
Umpires: Dusty Rhodes (Eng) and Tom Spencer (Eng)

- England won the toss and elected to field.
- 16 July was taken as a rest day.

=== 4th Test ===
27 – 29 July 1972
Scorecard

Australia	v	England
146 (86.5 overs); Keith Stackpole 52 (119); Derek Underwood 4/37 (31 overs)		263 (130.1 overs); Ray Illingworth 57 (252); Ashley Mallett 5/114 (52 overs)
136 (56.1 overs); Paul Sheahan 41* (135); Derek Underwood 6/45 (21 overs)		21/1 (10 overs); Brian Luckhurst 12* (37); Dennis Lillee 1/7 (5 overs)

England won by 9 wickets
Headingley, Leeds
Umpires: David Constant (Eng) and Charlie Elliott (Eng)

- Australia won the toss and elected to bat.
- The fungus that floored the Aussies

=== 5th Test ===
10 – 16 August 1972
Scorecard

England	v	Australia
284 (92.2 overs); Alan Knott 92 (126); Dennis Lillee 5/58 (24.2 overs)		399 (151.5 overs); Ian Chappell 118 (267); Derek Underwood 4/90 (38 overs)
356 (121.2 overs); Barry Wood 90 (216); Dennis Lillee 5/123 (32.2 overs)		242/5 (92.2 overs); Keith Stackpole 79 (163); Tony Greig 2/49 (25.3 overs)

Australia won by 5 wickets
The Oval, London
Umpires: Arthur Fagg (Eng) and Dusty Rhodes (Eng)

- England won the toss and elected to bat.
- 13 August was taken as a rest day.
- Barry Wood (Eng) made his Test debut.

The series was drawn 2–2, which meant that England retained the Ashes.

== ODI series ==
=== 1st ODI ===
24 August 1972
Scorecard

Australia; 222/8 (55 overs)	v	England; 226/4 (49.1 overs)
Ross Edwards 57 (84); Bob Woolmer 3/33 (10 overs)		Dennis Amiss 103 (134); Graeme Watson 2/28 (8 overs)

England won by 6 wickets
Old Trafford, Manchester
Umpires: Charlie Elliott (Eng) and Dusty Rhodes (Eng)
Player of the match: Dennis Amiss (Eng)

- Australia won the toss and elected to bat.
- Ross Edwards, Dennis Lillee, Bob Massie, Paul Sheahan, Graeme Watson (all Aus), Dennis Amiss, Geoff Arnold, Brian Close, Tony Greig and Bob Woolmer (all Eng) made their ODI debuts.
- Dennis Amiss (Eng) recorded the first century in ODI history.

=== 2nd ODI ===
26 August 1972
Scorecard

England; 236/9 (55 overs)	v	Australia; 240/5 (51.3 overs)
Alan Knott 50 (50); Ashley Mallett 2/24 (11 overs)		Keith Stackpole 52 (70); John Snow 3/35 (11 overs)

Australia won by 5 wickets
Lord's, London
Umpires: Arthur Fagg (Eng) and Tom Spencer (Eng)
Player of the match: Greg Chappell (Aus)

- Australia won the toss and elected to field.
- David Colley (Aus) made his ODI debut.

=== 3rd ODI ===
28 August 1972
Scorecard

Australia; 179/9 (55 overs)	v	England; 180/8 (51.3 overs)
Keith Stackpole 61 (144); Geoff Arnold 4/27 (11 overs)		Geoffrey Boycott 41 (90); Dennis Lillee 3/25 (11 overs)

England won by 2 wickets
Edgbaston, Birmingham
Umpires: David Constant (Eng) and Alan Oakman (Eng)
Player of the match: Barry Wood (Eng)

- England won the toss and elected to field.
- Jeff Hammond (Aus) and Barry Wood (Eng) made their ODI debuts.

== Annual reviews ==
- Playfair Cricket Annual 1973
- Wisden Cricketers' Almanack 1973
