= Norman Townsend =

Australian cricket umpire (1924–1984)

Norman Edward Townsend (24 October 1924 – February 1984) was an Australian cricket Test match umpire.

Townsend was born in Northam, Western Australia. He served in the Royal Australian Navy from 1942 to 1948.

He umpired one Test match between Australia and Pakistan at Adelaide on 22 December to 27 December 1972, won by Australia by an innings with Ian Chappell scoring 196, Rod Marsh becoming the first Australian wicket-keeper to score a century, and Ashley Mallett taking 8/59 in Pakistan's second innings. Townsend's partner in this match was Max O'Connell. In the previous season, 1971/72, a World XI visited Australia and played a series of Test standard, although never officially recognised as Tests. Townsend stood in one of these matches, at the WACA Ground in Perth, in which Dennis Lillee took 8/29 and 4/63 to help Australia to an innings win against a powerful batting line-up.

In a first-class umpiring career extending from January 1961 to January 1974, Townsend officiated in 56 matches, all of them at the WACA Ground except for his Test match at the Adelaide Oval.
