= Graeme Watson (cricketer) =

Australian sportsman (1945–2020)

Personal information
- Full name: Graeme Donald Watson
- Born: 8 March 1945; Kew, Victoria, Australia
- Died: 24 April 2020 (aged 75); Burradoo, New South Wales, Australia
- Batting: Right-handed
- Bowling: Right-arm medium
- Role: Bowler

International information
- National side: Australia
- Test debut (cap 241): 31 December 1966 v South Africa
- Last Test: 10 August 1972 v England
- ODI debut (cap 16): 24 August 1972 v England
- Last ODI: 26 August 1972 v England

Domestic team information
- Years: Team
- 1964/65–1970/71: Victoria
- 1971/72–1974/75: Western Australia
- 1975/76–1976/77: New South Wales

Career statistics
Competition	Test	ODI	FC	LA
Matches	5	2	107	18
Runs scored	97	11	4,674	315
Batting average	10.77	11.00	32.68	22.50
100s/50s	0/1	0/0	5/27	0/2
Top score	50	11*	176	99
Balls bowled	552	48	11,605	784
Wickets	6	2	186	27
Bowling average	42.33	14.00	25.31	20.29
5 wickets in innings	0	0	8	1
10 wickets in match	0	0	0	0
Best bowling	2/67	2/28	6/61	5/20
Catches/stumpings	1/–	0/–	73/–	7/–
- Source: Cricinfo, 3 September 2015

Graeme Donald Watson (8 March 1945 – 24 April 2020) was an Australian cricketer who played in five Test matches and two One Day Internationals (ODIs) between 1966 and 1972.

Watson made his first-class cricket debut for Victoria in 1964–65 before moving to Western Australia from 1971–72 to 1974–75, and then to New South Wales in 1976–77, when he became the first man to play Sheffield Shield cricket for three states. He played minor matches in World Series Cricket in 1977–78 and 1978–79.

Watson's highest first-class score came for the Australians against Hampshire County Cricket Club during Australia's tour of England in 1972. He and Keith Stackpole put on 301 for the first wicket, Watson scoring 176 in 234 minutes with 26 fours and five sixes, and taking the Australians to victory by nine wickets.

In all first-class cricket he scored 4674 runs at 32.68, with seven centuries, and took 186 wickets at 25.31, with five wickets or more in an innings eight times and best figures of 6 for 61 against South Australia in Melbourne in 1965–66.

Nicknamed Beatle because he wore his hair long, Ian Chappell called Watson "a genuine allrounder".

He also played 18 games of Australian rules football for Melbourne in the Victorian Football League (VFL) in 1964 and 1965.

== Football career ==
Watson was part of the Melbourne Football Club squad that won the 1964 Victorian Football League grand final. However during the 1965 season he suffered two broken jaws in succession.

== Cricket career ==
Watson made his first class debut for Victoria in 1964. He had a strong season in 1965-66 with 514 runs in the Sheffield Shield with an average of 39.53 and 14 wickets at an average of 28.21.

In June 1966 Watson was picked on the 1966-67 tour of South Africa, picked as a replacement for Doug Walters, who had been called up for national service. His roommate on the tour was Ian Chappell who later wrote "Before the tour, I'd played against Graeme, but I really only knew him as a slightly unusual Victorian in that he stayed around for a beer after play."

Watson scored a century against Eastern Province. When Neil Hawke was injured, Watson was picked to replace him for the second test. Watson scored 50 in Australia's first innings, batting at number eight. He took 0-27 in South Africa's first innings but injured his ankle while bowling and finished up on crutches. This meant Watson missed the third test where he was replaced by Neil Hawke. However he played in the last two tests. In the fourth, a draw, he scored 17 and 0 but took 2-67. In the fifth test Watson scored 0 and 9 and 1-58; Australia lost the match and the series 3-1.

Watson was due to start his national service but was allowed a deferment as he was a student.

In 1968 he signed to play for East Lancashire.

In 1969-70 Watson toured New Zealand. He was third selector, after captain Sam Trimble and vice captain John Inverarity. He played in all three unofficial tests.

=== Western Australia ===
In 1971-72 he moved to Western Australia, where he was part of Sheffield Shield winning teams in 1971-72, 1972–73 and 1974-75.

In 1971-72 his excellent form - 457 runs in ten innings - saw him picked in the Australian XI to replace John Inverarity for the third unofficial Test against the World XI. He was hit in the face from a delivery by Tony Greig described by Ian Chappell as "an unintentional beamer". Watson had to go to hospital with a broken nose and suffered fractured cheek bones. An artery broke and doctors could not stop the bleeding. He received forty pints of blood, heart massages and mouth to mouth resuscitation to stay alive. Chappell recalled " It was typical of Beatle to say very little about the incident; he made light of any injury and at times was too brave for his own good."

Watson was in hospital for three weeks but insisted on resuming his career and playing against NSW by February.

He toured for Australia in the 1972 Ashes squad. He played in the first test but only scored 2 and 0. He was dropped for Bob Massie in the second. Watson returned to the side for the fifth test playing as opener, scoring 13 and 6 and taking two wickets. This would be Watson's last test. Over the tour he scored 915 at 36.5 with two centuries and took 25 wickets at 24.84.

=== New South Wales ===
In 1975 Watson moved to Sydney for career reasons and played for New South Waes.

In 1977 Watson signed for World Series Cricket. In December 1977 when playing against the World XI he took 7-26.

== Personal life ==
Watson was a qualified architect and worked in sports stadium management, including the Sydney Olympic precinct. He had four marriages and two daughters.

He died on 24 April 2020 from cancer.

== Sources ==
- Cashman, R. (ed.) (1996) The Oxford Companion to Australian Cricket, Oxford: Melbourne. ISBN 0195535758.
