= Mark Clews =

Australian sportsman

Personal information
- Full name: Mark Lindsay Clews
- Born: 13 January 1952 (age 74); Adelaide, South Australia
- Batting: Right-handed
- Bowling: Right-arm fast-medium
- Role: Bowler

Domestic team information
- Years: Team
- 1976/77–1978/79: New South Wales

Career statistics
Competition	First-class	List A
Matches	17	2
Runs scored	484	29
Batting average	20.16	29.00
100s/50s	0/2	0/0
Top score	62	29
Balls bowled	2,738	128
Wickets	41	2
Bowling average	36.14	30.00
5 wickets in innings	1	0
10 wickets in match	0	0
Best bowling	6/41	1/28
Catches/stumpings	2/–	0/–
- Source: Cricinfo, 20 September 2013

Mark Lindsay Clews (born 13 January 1952) is a former Australian sportsman who represented New South Wales in cricket and the Australian Capital Territory in rugby union during the 1970s.

== Early career ==
Born in Adelaide, South Australia, Clews moved to Canberra with his family and gained a reputation as a promising young cricketer with the City club in the ACT Cricket Association competition. Clews all-round ability as a batsman and fast bowler led to his selection in the Australian Capital Territory Under-19s in the 1969/70 Australian Under-19s Championships, where he impressed, taking 8/41 in one match.

Clews graduated to the ACT senior team and enjoyed an excellent 1971/72 season in the ACT competition, topping the first-grade bowling averages with 51 wickets at 8.41 runs, while also scoring 173 for the ACT against Illawarra. As a result, Clews was chosen to represent a combined Southern New South Wales side against the visiting World XI side, opening the bowling and taking 1/44 off six overs before top scoring for Southern New South Wales with 46. While Clews's innings was lauded by the press, The Canberra Times journalist could only commiserate with Clews's bad luck at bowling to World XI batsman Graeme Pollock in full flight.

Encouraged by his good form and sensing a chance to play first-class cricket, Clews moved to Sydney for the 1972/73 season to play for Northern Districts in the Sydney Grade Competition, commuting to Sydney each weekend while continuing to live in Canberra where he studied business administration.

Clews's good form led him to be named in the New South Wales training squad for the 1973/74 season but New South Wales's playing depth meant that Clews remained in the Sydney grade competition. While Clews commuted to Sydney in the summers, he remained in Canberra during the winters playing rugby union for Canberra Royals in the ACTRU Premier Division and made his representative debut for the ACTRU against Australian Services on 21 July 1974. Clews impressed enough to be named in the ACTRU squad to tour Tonga, and was called "large, strong and fast ... and hard to stop."

== 1976/77 season ==
On 29 January 1977, Clews made a spectacular first-class debut for New South Wales, against Queensland at the Sydney Cricket Ground (SCG). After going wicketless in the first innings and scoring 15, Clews had his finest moment as a bowler in Queensland's second innings when he "triggered a sensational collapse to send Queensland crashing to defeat". Clews took three middle-order wickets in fifteen deliveries without conceding a run, leading to a New South Wales win by an innings and seven runs. The match report stated "the tall speedster extracted tremendous life and movement that troubled every batsman", leading New South Wales captain David Colley to say of his debutant "Clews showed a lot of maturity today – I instructed him to bowl a specific line and he did exactly as I asked".

In his second match for New South Wales, Clews showed off his batting capabilities, top scoring with 62, including eleven boundaries, from 49 minutes off a Western Australian bowling attack comprising future Test bowlers Wayne Clark, Mick Malone, Terry Alderman and Tony Mann.

Over the first-class season, Clews took 12 wickets at 24.75 and scored 124 runs at 24.80.

== 1977/78 season ==
Following the recruitment of many of Australia's leading cricketers to the privately owned World Series Cricket (WSC) franchise in 1977, the stiff competition for positions in the New South Wales team lessened, and Clews was chosen in a pre-season trial match. Opening the bowling for "Sydney West", Clews took 6/66 and 1/22, and scored not out 11 from number nine, winning the Man of the Match Award for his efforts.

Clews was suddenly New South Wales's opening bowler of choice and responded by taking 6/41, his best first-class bowling analysis, against Western Australia, maintaining "an excellent line and length and fully deserved his analysis of 6/41 off 15.2 overs" but broke down with an achilles injury in the following match against South Australia and, although declared fit to play against the touring Indian team, it was obvious to onlookers that he was not.

Clews also garnered praise for his batting in the match against Queensland, where he topscored with 44 against the "exceptional pace" of Jeff Thomson. Throughout the season, Clews took 25 wickets at 34.52 and scored 267 runs at 22.25.

== 1978/79 season ==
At the start of the 1978/79 Australian cricket season, Clews's good performances with ball and bat led to calls for him to play in that season's Ashes series. Veteran radio broadcaster Alan McGilvray was one such fan, stating "If his untiring efforts throughout the past winter are rewarded, Mark Clews could be a valuable member of the NSW team and possibly Australia ... He gains good height in his delivery which gives him high bounce from the pitch and if he can, as a result of his solid work, improve his line, freedom and flexibility in delivery he could be on the threshold of a most promising career. Ability is within him and it is now purely a matter of putting it all together." Cricket journalist Barry Rollings called Clews "one of the young hopes of Australian cricket" and thought him a contender for national selection if he could improve his batting.

However, Clews struggled to perform during the 1978/79 season, taking just four wickets at 80.50 and 93 runs at 13.28, before being dropped from the New South Wales side, leading former Test cricketer John Benaud to write at the end of the season, "It took the selectors until the South Australian game to realise Steve Bernard was still a far better bowler than the fancy looking Clews, "The Greek Adonis" as Bob Simpson refers to him. Too much show, too little thought, Clews."

== Post-first-class career ==
The end of World Series Cricket and the subsequent return of the WSC New South Wales players to domestic ranks pushed Clews back in the pecking order for places in the team, although he remained in the New South Wales selectors' thoughts, and was named in a state trial match played in Newcastle in September 1981. Clews performed well, taking 4/27 and laying claim to a state recall.

Following his retirement from cricket, Clews served as a selector for New South Wales from 1987 to 1991.

== Sources ==
- McGilvray, A. (1978) ABC Cricket Book, England Tour of Australia 1978–79, Australian Broadcasting Commission, Sydney. ISBN 0 642 972 44 3.
