= David Colley =

Australian cricketer (born 1947)

Personal information
- Full name: David John Colley
- Born: 15 March 1947 (age 79); Mosman, New South Wales, Australia
- Batting: Right-handed
- Bowling: Right-arm fast-medium

International information
- National side: Australia
- Test debut (cap 257): 8 June 1972 v England
- Last Test: 13 July 1972 v England
- Only ODI (cap 17): 26 August 1972 v England

Domestic team information
- Years: Team
- 1969/70–1978/79: New South Wales

Career statistics
Competition	Test	ODI	FC	LA
Matches	3	1	87	14
Runs scored	84	–	2,374	154
Batting average	21.00	–	23.74	22.00
100s/50s	0/1	–	1/13	0/0
Top score	54	–	101	40
Balls bowled	729	66	14,365	775
Wickets	6	0	236	24
Bowling average	52.00	–	31.60	19.20
5 wickets in innings	0	–	8	0
10 wickets in match	0	–	0	0
Best bowling	3/83	–	6/30	4/54
Catches/stumpings	1/–	0/–	44/–	4/–
- Source: Cricinfo, 12 December 2005

David John Colley (born 15 March 1947) is a former Australian cricketer who played in three Test matches and one One Day International in 1972.

Colley was a fast-medium bowler and useful lower-order batsman who played for New South Wales in the Sheffield Shield between 1969–70 and 1977–78.

Chosen in the Australian team for the 1972 tour of England, Colley played in the first three Tests in the 1972 Ashes series. He opened the bowling in his first Test in Manchester and was first change bowler (Dennis Lillee and Bob Massie opened) in his second at Lord's, when Massie took 16 wickets.

Playing in a List A match against Yorkshire at Bradford during the 1972 tour, Colley took 3/30.

== Sources ==
- Warner, D. (ed.) (2017) The Yorkshire County Cricket Club Annual, Yorkshire County Cricket Club: Leeds.
