= Western Australia Combined XI cricket team =

The Western Australia Combined XI was a representative team raised intermittently between the year 1936 and 1990. The team, comprising state cricketers and select players from the Australian national side, played against touring international sides. Matches were played exclusively at the WACA Ground in Perth. In total, nine matches were played – eight first-class, and one List A – with the Combined XI winning three matches, touring sides one match and five ending in a draw.

== Fixtures ==
=== First-class matches ===
Date	Toss	Result	Batting first	Batting second	Venue	Crowd	Ref
22 October 1936	MCC	Match drawn	Marylebone Cricket Club; 497 all out (101 overs) & 4/120 (30 overs)	Western Australia Combined XI; 436 all out (107.3 overs)	WACA Ground	25,300	
17 October 1946	Combined XI	Match drawn	Western Australia Combined XI; 462 all out (137 overs)	Marylebone Cricket Club; 302 all out (106.6 overs)	WACA Ground	24,500	
22 October 1954	MCC	MCC won by an innings and 62 runs	Western Australia Combined XI; 86 all out (42.6 overs) & 163 all out (64.6 overs)	Marylebone Cricket Club; 311 all out (105.6 overs)	WACA Ground	25,783	
24 October 1958	MCC	Match drawn	Marylebone Cricket Club; 311 all out (91.2 overs) & 4/257 (78 overs)	Western Australia Combined XI; 260 all out (96.3 overs)	WACA Ground	33,059	
26 October 1962	Combined XI	Combined XI won by 10 wickets	Marylebone Cricket Club; 157 all out (45.2 overs) & 270 all out (79.4 overs)	Western Australia Combined XI; 317 all out (98.1 overs) & 0/115 (18 overs)	WACA Ground	25,126	
1 November 1963	Combined XI	Match drawn	South Africans; 207 all out (53.5 overs) & 3/532 dec. (118 overs)	Western Australia Combined XI; 161 all out (47 overs) & 9/529 (107 overs)	WACA Ground	11,742	
5 November 1965	Combined XI	Match drawn	Marylebone Cricket Club; 7/379 dec. (93 overs) & 4/205 dec. (118 overs)	Western Australia Combined XI; 5/231 dec. (71.2 overs) & 6/322 (63 overs)	WACA Ground	10,515	
2 November 1968	Combined XI	Combined XI won by 7 wickets	West Indians; 254 all out (65.5 overs) & 7/432 dec. (71.4 overs)	Western Australia Combined XI; 333 all out (76.2 overs) & 3/354 (54 overs)	WACA Ground	16,474	

=== List A matches ===
Date	Toss	Result	Batting first	Batting second	Venue	Ref
30 October 1990 (50-over game)	Combined XI	Combined XI won by 3 wickets	England XI; 180 all out (49.2 overs)	Western Australia Combined XI; 7/181 (48.3 overs)	WACA Ground	

== See also ==
- Tasmania Combined XI
