= Tasmania Combined XI =

The Tasmania Combined XI was a representative cricket team raised intermittently between 1937 and 1979. The team, comprising state cricketers and select players from the Australian national side, played against touring international sides. Matches were played in Hobart, Launceston and Devonport. In total, sixteen first-class matches were played.

== First-class fixtures ==
Date	Opposition	Result	Venue	Crowd
15–18 January 1937	MCC	Match drawn	TCA Ground, Hobart	18,800
10–13 January 1947	MCC	Match drawn	TCA Ground, Hobart	18,700
19–22 January 1951	MCC	MCC won by 10 wickets	NTCA Ground, Launceston	12,448
12–14 March 1953	Australian XI	Australian XI won by 10 wickets	NTCA Ground, Launceston	12,256
8–11 January 1955	MCC	Match drawn	TCA Ground, Hobart	20,783
18–20 December 1958	MCC	Match drawn	NTCA Ground, Launceston	7,344
5–7 January 1961	West Indians	West Indians won by 139 runs	TCA Ground, Hobart	17,622
15–17 March 1961	Australian XI	Australian XI won by 192 runs	NTCA Ground, Launceston	4,300
4–7 January 1963	MCC	MCC won by 313 runs	NTCA Ground, Launceston	13,000
26–28 December 1963	South Africans	Match drawn	TCA Ground, Hobart	
22–25 January 1966	MCC	Match drawn	TCA Ground, Hobart	7,607
16–18 January 1969	West Indians	West Indians won by 10 wickets	NTCA Ground, Launceston	4,000
27–29 December 1970	MCC	Match drawn	NTCA Ground, Launceston	2,000
26–28 December 1971	World XI	Match drawn	TCA Ground, Hobart	
18–20 December 1972	Pakistanis	Match drawn	NTCA Ground, Launceston	
23–25 November 1979 (Note: The Tasmania side was labelled 'Tasmania Invitation XI' for this match)	West Indians	West Indians won by 260 runs	Formby Recreation Ground, Devonport	

== See also ==
- Western Australia Combined XI
