= Julien Wiener =

Australian cricketer

Personal information
- Full name: Julien Mark Wiener
- Born: 1 May 1955 (age 71); Melbourne, Victoria, Australia
- Batting: Right-handed
- Bowling: Right-arm offbreak
- Role: Batsman

International information
- National side: Australia (1979–1980)
- Test debut (cap 307): 14 December 1979 v England
- Last Test: 18 March 1980 v Pakistan
- ODI debut (cap 58): 8 December 1979 v England
- Last ODI: 18 January 1980 v West Indies

Domestic team information
- Years: Team
- 1977/78–1984/85: Victoria

Career statistics
Competition	Test	ODI	FC	LA
Matches	6	7	66	27
Runs scored	281	140	3,609	1,143
Batting average	25.54	20.00	30.32	45.72
100s/50s	0/2	0/1	7/13	1/11
Top score	93	50	221*	108*
Balls bowled	78	24	2,532	152
Wickets	0	0	17	1
Bowling average	–	–	68.47	143.00
5 wickets in innings	–	–	0	0
10 wickets in match	–	–	0	0
Best bowling	–	–	2/19	1/5
Catches/stumpings	4/–	2/–	49/–	7/–
- Source: ESPNcricinfo, 13 March 2024

Julien Mark Wiener (born 1 May 1955) is a former Australian cricketer who played in six Test matches and seven One Day Internationals in 1979 and 1980. A right-handed opening batsman and a very occasional off spin bowler, until Michael Klinger's debut he was the only known Jewish Australian to represent his country at cricket. A tall man, he was known for batting bare-headed showing his blonde hair.

== Biography ==
Wiener's mother and father, Bella and Sasha, were Polish and Austrian Jews respectively, and both escaped the concentration camps of Nazi Germany during The Holocaust. The surname Wiener came from Vienna, the home of Sasha. His parents married in 1947 in Paris, before coming to Australia as refugees in 1947. Wiener's father ran a successful textile business, which allowed him to send Wiener to the private Brighton Grammar School. Wiener's father had early sporting success in table tennis, which Wiener applied to his cricket, playing for Prahran in Melbourne grade cricket. He subsequently completed his university education at Royal Melbourne Institute of Technology in business management, before moving to England to pursue his cricket career.

He made a century on his first class debut for Victoria against Queensland in 1977–78, scoring 106. Two strong seasons, including three further centuries, saw Wiener selected to make his ODI debut as an opening batsman in December 1979 at the Melbourne Cricket Ground against England and the West Indies. He struggled, scoring 7 and 27 respectively. Despite this he was selected to make his Test cricket debut against England at the WACA a few days later. He made 11 in the first innings before being run-out while batting with captain Greg Chappell, before scoring 58 in the second innings as Australia won the match. He played in four consecutive tests that summer (two each against England and the West Indies) before being omitted for the final test of the summer. Wiener played in five further ODIs in the Australian season, with his best performances being a 33 and 50 against the West Indies in Sydney in the final two group matches. Averaging only twenty, he was dropped from the ODI team for the finals and ended his ODI career with a slow strike rate of only 42.

He was named to tour Pakistan in early 1980, and was recalled to the Test XI for the second and third tests in Faisalabad and Lahore. He made his highest score of 93 in the third test, but that turned out to be the last test of his career, as he was not selected for the national team again. He scored 281 runs at an average of 25.5 in his career.

He, along with Jeff Moss had a partnership of 390 at the Junction Oval against Western Australia in 1981–82. This still stands as a record for the third wicket for Australians in first-class cricket. Wiener scored an unbeaten 221 in that innings, one of three centuries he produced in the season. Wiener played at the first-class level until retiring at the 1984/85 season, having scored seven centuries in 66 matches. He had also claimed 17 wickets with his off spin, although none of these came at national level.

Wiener has worked in the corporate sector since leaving cricket. He worked in sales for various companies, and formed his own consulting company in 2015.
