= List of Australia ODI cricketers =

This is a list of Australian One-day International cricketers. A One Day International, or an ODI, is an international cricket match between two representative teams, each one having ODI status, as determined by the International Cricket Council (ICC). An ODI differs from Test matches in that the number of overs per team is limited, and that each team has only one innings. The list is arranged in the order in which each player earned his first ODI cap. Where more than one player earned his first ODI cap in the same match, those players are listed alphabetically by surname.

== Key ==
General
*: an innings that ended not out
Mat: number of matches played
Batting
Inn: number of innings
NO: number of times an innings ends not out
Runs: number of runs scored by batsman/off bowler's bowling
HS: highest score
Avg: batting average
100/50: number of centuries and half-centuries scored

Bowling
Balls: number of balls bowled
Mdn: number of maiden overs (overs off which no runs were scored)
Wkt: number of wickets taken
BB: best bowling figures
Avg: bowling average
5wI: number of times 5 wickets were taken in an innings
Fielding
Ca: number of catches taken
St: number of stumpings made

== Players ==
Statistics are correct as of 18 June 2026

Cap	Name	Career	Mat	Inn	NO	Runs	HS	Avg	100/50	Balls	Mdn	Runs	Wkt	BB	Avg	5wI	Ca	St	Ref
1	Greg Chappell	1971–1983	74	72	14	2,331	138*	40.18	3/14	3,108	41	2,097	72	5/15	29.12	2	23	0	
2	Ian Chappell	1971–1980	16	16	2	673	86	48.07	0/8	42	1	23	2	2/14	11.50	0	5	0	
3	Alan Connolly	1971	1	0	0	0	n/a	n/a	0/0	64	0	62	0	n/a	n/a	0	0	0	
4	Bill Lawry	1971	1	1	0	27	27	27.00	0/0	0	0	0	0	n/a	n/a	0	1	0	
5	Graham McKenzie	1971	1	0	0	0	n/a	n/a	0/0	60	0	22	2	2/22	11.00	0	1	0	
6	Ashley Mallett	1971–1975	9	3	1	14	8	7.00	0/0	502	7	341	11	3/34	31.00	0	4	0	
7	Rod Marsh	1971–1984	92	76	15	1,225	66	20.08	0/4	0	0	0	0	n/a	n/a	0	120	4	
8	Ian Redpath	1971–1975	5	5	0	46	24	9.20	0/0	0	0	0	0	n/a	n/a	0	2	0	
9	Keith Stackpole	1971–1974	6	6	0	224	61	37.33	0/3	77	0	54	3	3/40	18.00	0	1	0	
10	Alan Thomson	1971	1	0	0	0	n/a	n/a	0/0	64	2	22	1	1/22	22.00	0	0	0	
11	Doug Walters	1971–1981	28	24	6	513	59	28.50	0/2	314	3	273	4	2/24	68.25	0	10	0	
12	Ross Edwards	1972–1975	9	8	1	255	80*	36.42	0/3	0	0	0	0	n/a	n/a	0	0	0	
13	Dennis Lillee	1972–1983	63	34	8	240	42*	9.23	0/0	3,593	80	2,145	103	5/34	20.82	1	10	0	
14	Bob Massie	1972	3	1	1	16	16*	n/a	0/0	183	5	129	3	2/35	43.00	0	1	0	
15	Paul Sheahan	1972	3	3	0	75	50	25.00	0/1	0	0	0	0	n/a	n/a	0	0	0	
16	Graeme Watson	1972	2	2	1	11	11*	11.00	0/0	48	1	28	2	2/28	14.00	0	0	0	
17	David Colley	1972	1	0	0	0	n/a	n/a	0/0	66	1	72	0	n/a	n/a	0	0	0	
18	Jeff Hammond	1972	1	1	1	15	15*	n/a	0/0	54	1	41	1	1/41	41.00	0	0	0	
19	Ray Bright	1974–1986	11	8	4	66	19*	16.50	0/0	462	3	350	3	1/28	116.66	0	2	0	
20	Ian Davis	1974–1977	3	3	1	12	11*	6.00	0/0	0	0	0	0	n/a	n/a	0	0	0	
21	Geoff Dymock	1974–1980	15	7	4	35	14*	11.66	0/0	806	16	412	15	2/21	27.46	0	1	0	
22	Gary Gilmour	1974–1975	5	2	1	42	28*	42.00	0/0	320	9	165	16	6/14	10.31	2	2	0	
23	Max Walker	1974–1981	17	11	3	79	20	9.87	0/0	1,006	24	546	20	4/19	27.30	0	6	0	
24	Ashley Woodcock	1974–1974	1	1	0	53	53	53.00	0/1	0	0	0	0	n/a	n/a	0	0	0	
25	Wally Edwards	1975	1	1	0	2	2	2.00	0/0	1	0	0	0	n/a	n/a	0	0	0	
26	Alan Hurst	1975–1979	8	4	4	7	3*	n/a	0/0	402	11	203	12	5/21	16.91	1	1	0	
27	Terry Jenner	1975	1	1	0	12	12	12.00	0/0	64	1	28	0	n/a	n/a	0	0	0	
28	Jeff Thomson	1975–1985	50	30	6	181	21	7.54	0/0	2,696	37	1,942	55	4/67	35.30	0	9	0	
29	Rick McCosker	1975–1982	14	14	0	320	95	22.85	0/2	0	0	0	0	n/a	n/a	0	3	0	
30	Alan Turner	1975	6	6	0	247	101	41.16	1/0	0	0	0	0	n/a	n/a	0	3	0	
31	Gary Cosier	1975–1979	9	7	2	154	84	30.80	0/1	409	9	248	14	5/18	17.71	1	4	0	
32	David Hookes	1977–1986	39	36	2	826	76	24.29	0/5	29	0	28	1	1/2	28.00	0	11	0	
33	Mick Malone	1977–1982	10	7	3	36	15*	9.00	0/0	612	16	315	11	2/9	28.63	0	1	0	
34	Kerry O'Keeffe	1977	2	2	1	16	16*	16.00	0/0	132	3	79	2	1/36	39.50	0	0	0	
35	Len Pascoe	1977–1982	29	11	7	39	15*	9.75	0/0	1,568	21	1,066	53	5/30	20.11	1	6	0	
36	Craig Serjeant	1977–1978	3	3	0	73	46	24.33	0/0	0	0	0	0	n/a	n/a	0	1	0	
37	Kim Hughes	1977–1985	97	88	6	1,968	98	24.00	0/17	1	0	4	0	n/a	n/a	0	27	0	
38	Richie Robinson	1977	2	2	0	82	70	41.00	0/1	0	0	0	0	n/a	n/a	0	3	1	
39	Ian Callen	1978–1982	5	3	2	6	3*	6.00	0/0	180	2	148	5	3/24	29.60	0	2	0	
40	Wayne Clark	1978	2	0	0	0	n/a	n/a	0/0	100	3	61	3	2/39	20.33	0	0	0	
41	Rick Darling	1978–1982	18	18	1	363	74	21.35	0/1	0	0	0	0	n/a	n/a	0	6	0	
42	Trevor Laughlin	1978–1979	6	5	1	105	74	26.25	0/1	308	3	224	8	3/54	28.00	0	0	0	
43	Steve Rixon	1978–1985	6	6	3	40	20*	13.33	0/0	0	0	0	0	n/a	n/a	0	9	2	
44	Bob Simpson	1978	2	2	0	36	23	18.00	0/0	102	0	95	2	2/30	47.50	0	4	0	
45	Peter Toohey	1978–1979	5	4	2	105	54*	52.50	0/1	0	0	0	0	n/a	n/a	0	0	0	
46	Graeme Wood	1978–1989	83	77	11	2,219	114*	33.62	3/11	0	0	0	0	n/a	n/a	0	17	0	
47	Graham Yallop	1978–1984	30	27	6	823	66*	39.19	0/7	138	0	119	3	2/28	39.66	0	5	0	
48	Bruce Yardley	1978–1983	7	4	0	58	28	14.50	0/0	198	5	130	7	3/28	18.57	0	1	0	
49	Allan Border	1979–1994	273	252	39	6,524	127*	30.62	3/39	2,661	11	2,071	73	3/20	28.36	0	127	0	
50	Phil Carlson	1979	4	2	0	11	11	5.50	0/0	168	3	70	2	1/21	35.00	0	0	0	
51	John Maclean	1979	2	1	0	11	11	11.00	0/0	0	0	0	0	n/a	n/a	0	0	0	
52	Andrew Hilditch	1979–1985	8	8	0	226	72	28.25	0/1	0	0	0	0	n/a	n/a	0	1	0	
53	Rodney Hogg	1979–1985	71	35	20	137	22	9.13	0/0	3,677	57	2,418	85	4/29	28.44	0	8	0	
54	Kevin Wright	1979	5	2	0	29	23	14.50	0/0	0	0	0	0	n/a	n/a	0	8	0	
55	Jeff Moss	1979	1	1	0	7	7	7.00	0/0	0	0	0	0	n/a	n/a	0	2	0	
56	Graeme Porter	1979	2	1	0	3	3	3.00	0/0	108	5	33	3	2/13	11.00	0	1	0	
57	Bruce Laird	1979–1982	23	23	3	594	117*	29.70	1/2	0	0	0	0	n/a	n/a	0	5	0	
58	Julien Wiener	1979–1980	7	7	0	140	50	20.00	0/1	24	0	34	0	n/a	n/a	0	2	0	
59	Dav Whatmore	1980	1	1	0	2	2	2.00	0/0	0	0	0	0	n/a	n/a	0	0	0	
60	John Dyson	1980–1983	29	27	4	755	79	32.82	0/4	0	0	0	0	n/a	n/a	0	12	0	
61	Trevor Chappell	1980–1983	20	13	0	229	110	17.61	1/0	736	4	538	19	3/31	28.31	0	8	0	
62	Shaun Graf	1980–1981	11	6	0	24	8	4.00	0/0	522	4	345	8	2/23	43.12	0	1	0	
63	Geoff Lawson	1980–1989	79	52	18	378	33*	11.11	0/0	4,259	94	2,592	88	4/26	29.45	0	18	0	
64	Martin Kent	1981	5	5	1	78	33	19.50	0/0	0	0	0	0	n/a	n/a	0	4	0	
65	Graeme Beard	1981	2	0	0	0	n/a	n/a	0/0	112	3	70	4	2/20	17.50	0	0	0	
66	Terry Alderman	1981–1991	65	18	6	32	9*	2.66	0/0	3,371	75	2,056	88	5/17	23.36	2	29	0	
67	Dirk Wellham	1981–1987	17	17	2	379	97	25.26	0/1	0	0	0	0	n/a	n/a	0	8	0	
68	Greg Ritchie	1982–1987	44	42	7	959	84	27.40	0/6	0	0	0	0	n/a	n/a	0	9	0	
69	Wayne B. Phillips	1982–1986	48	41	6	852	75*	24.34	0/6	0	0	0	0	n/a	n/a	0	42	7	
70	Carl Rackemann	1983–1991	52	18	6	34	9*	2.83	0/0	2,791	51	1,833	82	5/16	22.35	1	6	0	
71	Kepler Wessels	1983–1985	54	51	3	1,740	107	36.25	1/14	737	2	655	18	2/16	36.38	0	19	0	
72	John Maguire	1983–1984	23	11	5	42	14*	7.00	0/0	1,009	12	769	19	3/61	40.47	0	2	0	
73	Tom Hogan	1983–1984	16	12	4	72	27	9.00	0/0	917	12	574	23	4/33	24.95	0	10	0	
74	Ken MacLeay	1983–1987	16	13	2	139	41	12.63	0/0	857	8	626	15	6/39	41.73	1	2	0	
75	Steve Smith	1983–1985	28	24	2	861	117	39.13	2/8	7	0	5	0	n/a	n/a	0	8	0	
76	Mike Whitney	1983–1993	38	13	7	40	9*	6.66	0/0	2,106	43	1,249	46	4/34	27.15	0	11	0	
77	Roger Woolley	1983	4	3	2	31	16	31.00	0/0	0	0	0	0	n/a	n/a	0	1	1	
78	Greg Matthews	1984–1993	59	50	13	619	54	16.72	0/1	2,808	21	2,004	57	3/27	35.15	0	23	0	
79	Dean Jones	1984–1994	164	161	25	6,068	145	44.61	7/46	106	0	81	3	2/34	27.00	0	54	0	
80	David Boon	1984–1995	181	177	16	5,964	122	37.04	5/37	82	0	86	0	n/a	n/a	0	45	0	
81	Murray Bennett	1984–1985	8	4	1	9	6*	3.00	0/0	408	6	275	4	2/27	68.75	0	1	0	
82	Craig McDermott	1985–1996	138	78	17	432	37	7.08	0/0	7,461	101	5,018	203	5/44	24.71	1	27	0	
83	Simon O'Donnell	1985–1991	87	64	15	1,242	74*	25.34	0/9	4,350	49	3,102	108	5/13	28.72	1	22	0	
84	Bob Holland	1985	2	0	0	0	n/a	n/a	0/0	126	2	99	2	2/49	49.50	0	0	0	
85	Rod McCurdy	1985	11	6	2	33	13*	8.25	0/0	515	8	375	12	3/19	31.25	0	1	0	
86	Robbie Kerr	1985	4	4	1	97	87*	32.33	0/1	0	0	0	0	n/a	n/a	0	1	0	
87	Simon Davis	1986–1988	39	11	7	20	6	5.00	0/0	2,016	46	1,133	44	3/10	25.75	0	5	0	
88	Dave Gilbert	1986	14	8	3	39	8	7.80	0/0	684	4	552	18	5/46	30.66	1	3	0	
89	Bruce Reid	1986–1992	61	21	8	49	10	3.76	0/0	3,250	53	2,203	63	5/53	34.96	1	6	0	
90	Steve Waugh	1986–2002	325	288	58	7,569	120*	32.90	3/45	8,883	56	6,761	195	4/33	34.67	0	111	0	
91	Geoff Marsh	1986–1992	117	115	6	4,357	126*	39.97	9/22	6	0	4	0	n/a	n/a	0	31	0	
92	Glenn Trimble	1986	2	2	1	4	4	4.00	0/0	24	0	32	0	n/a	n/a	0	0	0	
93	Tim Zoehrer	1986–1994	22	15	3	130	50	10.83	0/1	0	0	0	0	n/a	n/a	0	21	2	
94	Greg Dyer	1986–1988	23	13	2	174	45*	15.81	0/0	0	0	0	0	n/a	n/a	0	24	4	
95	Glenn Bishop	1987	2	2	0	13	7	6.50	0/0	0	0	0	0	n/a	n/a	0	1	0	
96	Peter Taylor	1987–1992	83	47	25	437	54*	19.86	0/1	3,937	33	2,740	97	4/38	28.24	0	34	0	
97	Mike Veletta	1987–1989	20	19	4	484	68*	32.26	0/2	0	0	0	0	n/a	n/a	0	8	0	
98	Tom Moody	1987–1999	76	64	12	1,211	89	23.28	0/10	2,797	31	2,014	52	3/25	38.73	0	21	0	
99	Tim May	1987–1995	47	12	8	39	15	9.75	0/0	2,504	17	1,772	39	3/19	45.43	0	3	0	
100	Andrew Zesers	1987	2	2	2	10	8*	n/a	0/0	90	1	74	1	1/37	74.00	0	1	0	
101	Tony Dodemaide	1988–1993	24	16	7	124	30	13.77	0/0	1,327	30	753	36	5/21	20.91	1	7	0	
102	Ian Healy	1988–1997	168	120	36	1,764	56	21.00	0/4	0	0	0	0	n/a	n/a	0	194	39	
103	Jamie Siddons	1988	1	1	0	32	32	32.00	0/0	0	0	0	0	n/a	n/a	0	0	0	
104	Merv Hughes	1988–1993	33	17	8	100	20	11.11	0/0	1,639	22	1,115	38	4/44	29.34	0	6	0	
105	Mark Waugh	1988–2002	244	236	20	8,500	173	39.35	18/50	3,687	11	2,938	85	5/24	34.56	1	108	0	
106	Greg Campbell	1989–1990	12	3	1	6	4*	3.00	0/0	613	9	404	18	3/17	22.44	0	4	0	
107	Mark Taylor	1989–1997	113	110	1	3,514	105	32.23	1/28	0	0	0	0	n/a	n/a	0	56	0	
108	Paul Reiffel	1992–1999	92	57	21	503	58	13.97	0/1	4,732	85	3,096	106	4/13	29.20	0	25	0	
109	Damien Martyn	1992–2006	208	182	51	5,346	144*	40.80	5/37	794	2	704	12	2/21	58.66	0	69	0	
110	Shane Warne	1993–2003	193	106	28	1,016	55	13.02	0/1	10,600	110	7,514	291	5/33	25.82	1	80	0	
111	Matthew Hayden	1993–2008	160	154	15	6,131	181*	44.10	10/36	6	0	18	0	n/a	n/a	0	68	0	
112	Brendon Julian	1993–1999	25	17	0	224	35	13.17	0/0	1,146	11	997	22	3/40	45.31	0	8	0	
113	Glenn McGrath	1993–2007	249	67	38	115	11	3.96	0/0	12,928	279	8,354	380	7/15	21.98	7	36	0	
114	Michael Slater	1993–1997	42	42	1	987	73	24.07	0/9	12	1	11	0	n/a	n/a	0	9	0	
115	Damien Fleming	1994–2001	88	31	18	152	29	11.69	0/0	4,619	62	3,402	134	5/36	25.38	1	14	0	
116	Michael Bevan	1994–2004	232	196	67	6,912	108*	53.58	6/46	1,966	4	1,655	36	3/36	45.97	0	69	0	
117	Justin Langer	1994–1997	8	7	2	160	36	32.00	0/0	0	0	0	0	n/a	n/a	0	2	1	
118	Jo Angel	1994–1995	3	1	0	0	0	0.00	0/0	162	3	113	4	2/47	28.25	0	0	0	
119	Gavin Robertson	1994–1998	13	7	4	45	15	15.00	0/0	597	1	430	8	3/29	53.75	0	3	0	
120	Phil Emery	1994	1	1	1	11	11*	n/a	0/0	0	0	0	0	n/a	n/a	0	3	0	
121	Stuart Law	1994–1999	54	51	5	1,237	110	26.89	1/7	807	3	635	12	2/22	52.91	0	12	0	
122	Greg Blewett	1995–1999	32	30	3	551	57*	20.40	0/2	749	3	646	14	2/6	46.14	0	7	0	
123	Ricky Ponting	1995–2012	374	364	39	13,589	164	41.81	29/82	150	0	104	3	1/12	34.66	0	159	0	
124	Shane Lee	1995–2001	45	35	8	477	47	17.66	0/0	1,706	14	1,245	48	5/33	25.93	1	23	0	
125	Michael Kasprowicz	1995–2005	43	13	9	74	28*	18.50	0/0	2,225	28	1,674	67	5/45	24.98	2	13	0	
126	Brad Hogg	1996–2008	123	65	26	790	71*	20.25	0/2	5,564	37	4,188	156	5/32	26.84	2	36	0	
127	Jason Gillespie	1996–2005	97	39	16	289	44*	12.56	0/0	5,144	79	3,611	142	5/22	25.42	3	10	0	
128	Darren Lehmann	1996–2005	117	101	22	3,078	119	38.96	4/17	1,793	3	1,445	52	4/7	27.78	0	26	0	
129	Adam Gilchrist	1996–2008	286	278	11	9,595	172	35.93	16/55	0	0	0	0	n/a	n/a	0	416	54	
130	Andy Bichel	1997–2004	67	36	13	471	64	20.47	0/1	3,257	28	2,463	78	7/20	31.57	2	19	0	
131	Anthony Stuart	1997	3	1	0	1	1	1.00	0/0	180	2	109	8	5/26	13.62	1	2	0	
132	Adam Dale	1997–2000	30	12	8	78	15*	19.50	0/0	1,596	34	979	32	3/18	30.59	0	11	0	
133	Michael Di Venuto	1997	9	9	0	241	89	26.77	0/2	0	0	0	0	n/a	n/a	0	1	0	
134	Matthew Elliott	1997	1	1	0	1	1	1.00	0/0	0	0	0	0	n/a	n/a	0	0	0	
135	Ian Harvey	1997–2004	73	51	11	715	48*	17.87	0/0	3,279	29	2,577	85	4/16	30.31	0	17	0	
136	Paul Wilson	1997–1998	11	5	2	4	2	1.33	0/0	562	6	450	13	3/39	34.61	0	1	0	
137	Jimmy Maher	1998–2003	26	20	3	438	95	25.76	0/1	0	0	0	0	n/a	n/a	0	18	0	
138	Brad Young	1998–1999	6	3	1	31	18	15.50	0/0	234	0	251	1	1/26	251.00	0	2	0	
139	Andrew Symonds	1998–2009	198	161	33	5,088	156	39.75	6/30	5,935	30	4,955	133	5/18	37.25	1	82	0	
140	Brett Lee	2000–2012	221	110	44	1176	59	17.81	0/3	11,185	138	8,877	380	5/22	23.36	9	54	0	
141	Stuart MacGill	2000	3	2	1	1	1	1.00	0/0	180	4	105	6	4/19	17.50	0	2	0	
142	Nathan Bracken	2001–2009	116	35	18	199	21*	11.70	0/0	5,759	91	4,240	174	5/47	24.36	2	26	0	
143	Simon Katich	2001–2006	45	42	5	1,324	107*	35.78	1/9	0	0	0	0	n/a	n/a	0	13	0	
144	Brad Haddin	2001–2015	126	115	16	3,122	110	31.53	2/16	0	0	0	0	n/a	n/a	0	170	11	
145	Brad Williams	2002–2004	25	6	4	27	13*	13.50	0/0	1,203	19	814	35	5/22	23.25	2	4	0	
146	Ryan Campbell	2002	2	2	0	54	38	27.00	0/0	0	0	0	0	n/a	n/a	0	4	1	
147	Nathan Hauritz	2002–2011	58	32	17	336	53*	22.40	0/1	2,724	12	2,152	63	4/29	34.15	0	24	0	
148	Shane Watson	2002–2015	190	169	27	5,757	185*	40.54	9/33	6,466	35	5,342	168	4/36	31.79	0	64	0	
149	Michael Clarke	2003–2015	245	223	44	7,981	130	44.58	8/58	2,585	7	2,146	57	5/35	37.64	1	106	0	
150	Michael Hussey	2004–2012	185	157	44	5,442	109*	48.15	3/39	240	1	235	2	1/22	117.50	0	105	0	
151	James Hopes	2005–2010	84	61	8	1,326	63*	25.01	0/3	3,157	32	2,384	67	5/14	35.58	1	25	0	
152	Cameron White	2005–2018	91	77	16	2,072	105	33.96	2/11	331	2	351	12	3/5	29.25	0	37	0	
153	Stuart Clark	2005–2009	39	12	7	69	16*	13.80	0/0	1,829	18	1,477	53	4/54	27.86	0	10	0	
154	Brad Hodge	2005–2007	25	21	2	575	123	30.26	1/3	66	0	51	1	1/17	51.00	0	16	0	
155	Mick Lewis	2005–2006	7	1	1	4	4*	n/a	0/0	341	1	391	7	3/56	55.85	0	1	0	
156	Mitchell Johnson	2005–2015	153	91	32	951	73*	16.11	0/2	7,489	72	6,038	239	6/31	25.26	3	35	0	
157	Brett Dorey	2006	4	1	0	2	2	2.00	0/0	162	2	146	2	1/12	73.00	0	0	0	
158	Phil Jaques	2006–2007	6	6	0	125	94	20.83	0/1	0	0	0	0	n/a	n/a	0	3	0	
159	Dan Cullen	2006	5	1	1	2	2*	n/a	0/0	213	4	147	2	2/25	73.50	0	2	0	
160	Mark Cosgrove	2006	3	3	0	112	74	37.33	0/1	30	0	13	1	1/1	13.00	0	0	0	
161	Ben Hilfenhaus	2007–2012	25	11	8	29	16	9.66	0/0	1,216	16	1,075	29	5/33	37.06	1	10	0	
162	Shaun Tait	2007–2011	35	7	5	25	11	12.50	0/0	1,688	11	1,461	62	4/39	23.56	0	8	0	
163	Adam Voges	2007–2013	31	28	9	870	112*	45.78	1/4	301	1	276	6	1/3	46.00	0	7	0	
164	Ashley Noffke	2008	1	0	0	0	n/a	n/a	0/0	54	0	46	1	1/46	46.00	0	0	0	
165	Shaun Marsh	2008–2019	73	72	4	2,773	151	40.77	7/15	0	0	0	0	n/a	n/a	0	22	0	
166	Luke Ronchi	2008	4	2	0	76	64	38.00	0/1	0	0	0	0	n/a	n/a	0	5	2	
167	David Hussey	2008–2013	69	61	6	1,796	111	32.65	1/14	802	1	698	18	4/21	38.77	0	29	0	
168	Brett Geeves	2008–2009	2	2	2	10	10*	n/a	0/0	90	0	78	3	2/11	26.60	0	1	0	
169	Ryan Harris	2009–2012	21	13	7	48	21	8.00	0/0	1,031	13	832	44	5/19	18.90	3	6	0	
170	David Warner	2009–2023	161	159	6	6,932	179	45.30	22/33	6	0	8	0	n/a	n/a	0	71	0	
171	Callum Ferguson	2009–2011	30	25	9	663	71*	41.43	0/5	0	0	0	0	n/a	n/a	0	7	0	
172	Peter Siddle	2009–2019	20	6	3	31	10*	10.33	0/0	901	10	743	17	3/55	43.70	0	1	0	
173	Ben Laughlin	2009	5	1	1	1	1*	n/a	0/0	224	1	219	4	1/28	54.75	0	2	0	
174	Shane Harwood	2009	1	1	1	0	0*	n/a	0/0	60	0	57	2	2/57	28.50	0	0	0	
175	Doug Bollinger	2009–2011	39	8	2	50	30	8.33	0/0	1,942	28	1,482	62	5/35	23.90	2	12	0	
176	Marcus North	2009	2	2	0	6	5	3.00	0/0	18	0	16	0	n/a	n/a	0	1	0	
177	Dirk Nannes	2009	1	1	0	1	1	1.00	0/0	42	1	20	1	1/20	20.00	0	0	0	
178	Tim Paine	2009–2018	35	35	3	890	111	27.81	1/5	0	0	0	0	n/a	n/a	0	51	4	
179	Moises Henriques	2009–2021	16	15	2	117	22	9.00	0/0	402	1	347	8	3/32	43.37	0	6	0	
180	Graham Manou	2009	4	1	0	7	7	7.00	0/0	0	0	0	0	n/a	n/a	0	5	0	
181	Clint McKay	2009–2014	59	31	10	190	30	9.04	0/0	2,965	38	2,364	97	5/28	24.37	2	7	0	
182	Steve Smith	2010–2025	170	154	20	5,800	164	43.28	12/35	1,076	1	971	28	3/16	34.67	0	90	0	
183	Josh Hazlewood	2010–	96	38	29	135	23*	15.00	0/0	4,978	65	3,928	142	6/52	27.66	3	32	0	
184	John Hastings	2010–2017	29	21	11	271	51	27.10	0/1	1,486	7	1,256	42	6/45	29.90	1	5	0	
185	Mitchell Starc	2010–	130	77	27	583	52*	11.66	0/1	6,638	56	5,826	247	6/28	23.58	9	47	0	
186	Xavier Doherty	2010–2013	60	23	16	101	15*	14.42	0/0	2,792	17	2,224	55	4/28	40.43	0	19	0	
187	Jason Krejza	2011	8	2	1	13	7	13.00	0/0	425	0	331	7	2/28	47.28	0	2	0	
188	James Pattinson	2011–2015	15	8	4	42	13	10.50	0/0	727	6	681	16	4/51	42.56	0	3	0	
189	Pat Cummins	2011–	90	59	22	537	37	14.51	0/0	4,683	46	4,116	143	5/70	28.78	1	24	0	
190	Mitchell Marsh	2011–	107	103	12	3447	177*	37.87	4/25	2,213	9	2,036	57	5/33	35.71	1	36	0	
191	Dan Christian	2012–2021	20	18	5	273	39	21.00	0/0	727	4	595	20	5/31	29.75	1	10	0	
192	Matthew Wade	2012–2021	97	83	12	1,867	100*	26.29	1/11	0	0	0	0	n/a	n/a	0	108	9	
193	Peter Forrest	2012	15	14	0	368	104	26.28	1/3	0	0	0	0	n/a	n/a	0	4	0	
194	Nathan Lyon	2012–2019	29	14	10	77	30	19.25	0/0	1,626	11	1,334	29	4/44	46.00	0	7	0	
195	George Bailey	2012–2016	90	85	10	3,044	156	40.58	3/22	0	0	0	0	n/a	n/a	0	48	0	
196	Glenn Maxwell	2012–2025	149	136	18	3,990	201*	33.84	4/23	4,002	14	3,644	77	4/40	47.32	0	91	0	
197	Aaron Finch	2013–2022	146	142	3	5,406	153*	38.89	17/30	284	0	259	4	1/2	64.75	0	71	0	
198	Phillip Hughes	2013–2014	25	24	1	826	138*	35.91	2/4	0	0	0	0	n/a	n/a	0	5	0	
199	Usman Khawaja	2013–2019	40	39	2	1,554	104	42.00	2/12	0	0	0	0	n/a	n/a	0	13	0	
200	Ben Cutting	2013–2014	4	2	0	53	27	26.50	0/0	216	1	158	5	3/45	31.60	0	1	0	
201	Kane Richardson	2013–2020	25	12	7	75	24*	15.00	0/0	1,312	11	1,240	39	5/68	31.79	1	7	0	
202	James Faulkner	2013–2017	69	52	22	1,032	116	34.40	1/4	3,211	12	2,962	96	4/32	30.85	0	21	0	
203	Fawad Ahmed	2013	3	1	1	4	4*	n/a	0/0	144	0	145	3	1/39	48.33	0	0	0	
204	Nathan Coulter-Nile	2013–2019	32	21	6	252	92	16.80	0/1	1,678	10	1,555	52	4/48	29.90	0	7	0	
205	Sean Abbott	2014–	29	21	2	374	69	19.68	0/2	1,331	9	1,271	35	3/23	36.31	0	14	0	
206	Gurinder Sandhu	2015	2	0	0	0	n/a	n/a	0/0	120	0	107	3	2/49	35.67	0	0	0	
207	Joe Burns	2015	6	6	0	146	69	24.33	0/1	0	0	0	0	n/a	n/a	0	2	0	
208	Ashton Agar	2015–2023	21	17	4	274	46	21.07	0/0	1,044	4	918	20	2/31	45.90	0	10	0	
209	Marcus Stoinis	2015–2025	71	64	8	1,495	146*	26.69	1/6	2,071	5	2,070	48	3/16	43.12	0	18	0	
210	Scott Boland	2016	14	4	1	9	4	3.00	0/0	716	3	725	16	3/67	45.31	0	3	0	
211	Joel Paris	2016	2	0	0	0	n/a	n/a	0/0	96	0	93	1	1/40	93.00	0	1	0	
212	Adam Zampa	2016–	129	70	26	435	36	9.88	0/0	6,687	18	6,201	207	5/35	29.95	1	20	0	
213	Travis Head	2016–	87	84	7	3280	154*	42.59	8/18	1215	0	1162	28	4/28	41.50	0	19	0	
214	Daniel Worrall	2016	3	1	1	6	6*	n/a	0/0	158	0	171	1	1/43	171.00	0	1	0	
215	Joe Mennie	2016	2	2	0	1	1	0.50	0/0	120	2	131	3	3/49	43.66	0	0	0	
216	Chris Tremain	2016	4	3	2	23	23*	23.00	0/0	240	0	255	7	3/64	36.42	0	1	0	
217	Chris Lynn	2017–2018	4	4	0	75	44	18.75	0/0	0	0	0	0	n/a	n/a	0	3	0	
218	Billy Stanlake	2017–	7	5	2	4	2	1.33	0/0	354	3	324	7	3/35	46.28	0	1	0	
219	Peter Handscomb	2017–2019	22	20	1	632	117	33.26	1/4	0	0	0	0	n/a	n/a	0	14	0	
220	Sam Heazlett	2017	1	1	0	4	4	4.00	0/0	0	0	0	0	n/a	n/a	0	0	0	
221	Hilton Cartwright	2017	2	2	0	2	1	1.00	0/0	0	0	0	0	n/a	n/a	0	1	0	
222	Andrew Tye	2018	7	7	3	57	19	14.25	0/0	387	0	392	12	5/46	32.66	1	1	0	
223	Alex Carey	2018–	96	88	13	2,523	106	33.64	1/14	0	0	0	0	n/a	n/a	0	102	10	
224	Jhye Richardson	2018–2022	15	9	4	93	29	18.60	0/0	810	11	793	27	4/26	29.37	0	5	0	
225	Michael Neser	2018–2023	2	2	0	8	6	4.00	0/0	100	1	120	2	2/46	60.00	0	0	0	
226	D'Arcy Short	2018–2020	8	8	1	211	69	30.14	0/1	90	0	114	0	n/a	n/a	0	2	0	
227	Jason Behrendorff	2019–2022	12	6	3	21	11*	7.00	0/0	645	7	568	16	5/44	35.50	1	3	0	
228	Ashton Turner	2019–	9	7	1	192	84*	32.00	0/1	84	1	60	2	1/23	30.00	0	4	0	
229	Marnus Labuschagne	2020–	66	58	4	1,871	124	34.64	2/12	323	1	358	10	3/39	35.80	0	41	0	
230	Cameron Green	2020–	42	37	10	1055	118*	39.07	1/5	904	0	869	21	5/33	41.38	1	21	0	
231	Wes Agar	2021	2	2	0	50	41	25.00	0/0	66	1	39	0	n/a	n/a	0	0	0	
232	Ben McDermott	2021–2023	5	5	0	223	104	44.60	1/1	n/a	n/a	n/a	n/a	n/a	n/a	n/a	0	0	
233	Josh Philippe	2021–	4	4	0	102	39	25.50	0/0	n/a	n/a	n/a	n/a	n/a	n/a	n/a	4	0	
234	Riley Meredith	2021–	4	3	3	19	17*	n/a	0/0	168	0	202	2	1/50	101.00	0	0	0	
235	Nathan Ellis	2022–	17	12	4	106	18	13.25	0/0	837	4	779	18	2/13	43.27	0	4	0	
236	Mitchell Swepson	2022	2	0	0	0	n/a	n/a	0/0	98	0	103	2	2/53	51.50	0	0	0	
237	Matthew Kuhnemann	2022–	5	2	0	16	15	8.00	0/0	252	3	217	8	2/26	27.12	0	2	0	
238	Josh Inglis	2022–	45	41	4	1126	120*	30.43	2/6	0	0	0	0	n/a	n/a	0	44	5	
239	Aaron Hardie	2023–	15	12	0	180	44	15.00	0/0	426	5	392	10	2/13	39.20	0	6	0	
240	Tim David	2023–	4	4	0	45	35	11.25	0/0	12	0	20	1	1/20	20.00	0	0	0	
241	Tanveer Sangha	2023–	4	3	2	6	5*	6.00	0/0	174	0	200	2	1/61	100.00	0	0	0	
242	Matthew Short	2023–	18	16	0	392	74	24.50	0/3	336	0	323	2	1/39	161.50	0	7	0	
243	Spencer Johnson	2023–	9	5	3	33	14	16.50	0/0	456	1	433	11	3/42	39.36	0	2	0	
244	Xavier Bartlett	2024–	14	10	0	124	52	12.40	0/1	703	5	622	27	4/17	23.03	0	5	0	
245	Lance Morris	2024–	3	1	0	n/a	n/a	n/a	n/a	123	3	96	4	2/13	24.00	0	1	0	
246	Jake Fraser-McGurk	2024–2025	7	7	0	98	41	14.00	0/0	0	0	0	0	n/a	n/a	0	3	0	
247	Will Sutherland	2024	2	1	0	18	18	18.00	0/0	51	0	33	2	2/28	16.50	0	1	0	
248	Ben Dwarshuis	2024–	6	3	0	61	33	20.33	0/0	294	1	270	11	3/47	24.54	0	1	0	
249	Cooper Connolly	2024–	20	17	2	529	149	35.26	1/3	301	0	260	10	5/22	26.00	1	6	0	
250	Mitchell Owen	2025–	3	2	0	37	36	18.50	0/0	36	0	42	2	2/20	21.00	0	0	0	
251	Matt Renshaw	2025–	17	17	2	540	109	36.00	1/3	342	2	312	9	2/35	34.66	0	9	0	
252	Oliver Peake	2026–	8	8	1	210	48	30.00	0/0	54	0	48	1	1/29	48.00	0	0	0	
253	Liam Scott	2026–	1	1	0	2	2	2.00	0/0	48	0	57	2	2/57	28.50	0	1	0	
254	Jack Edwards	2026–	4	3	0	47	25	15.66	0/0	198	1	206	5	5/67	41.20	1	0	0	
255	Mahli Beardman	2026–	1	0	0	n/a	n/a	n/a	0/0	46	1	24	6	6/24	4.00	1	0	0	

== Captains ==
Player	Dates of captaincy	Mat	Won	Lost	Tied	No result	% win
Bill Lawry	1971	1	1	0	0	0	100.00
Ian Chappell	1972–1975	11	6	5	0	0	54.55
Greg Chappell	1975–1983	49	21	25	0	3	45.65
Bob Simpson	1978	2	1	1	0	0	50.00
Graham Yallop	1979	4	2	1	0	1	66.67
Kim Hughes	1979–1984	49	21	23	1	4	47.78
David Hookes	1983	1	0	1	0	0	0.00
Allan Border	1985–1994	178	107	67	1	3	61.43
Ray Bright	1986	1	0	1	0	0	0.00
Geoff Marsh	1987–1991	4	3	1	0	0	75.00
Mark Taylor	1992–1997	67	36	30	1	0	54.48
Ian Healy	1996–1997	8	5	3	0	0	62.50
Steve Waugh	1997–2002	106	67	35	3	1	65.24
Shane Warne	1998–1999	11	10	1	0	0	90.91
Adam Gilchrist	2001–2007	17	12	4	0	1	75.00
Ricky Ponting	2002–2012	229	164	51	2	12	76.03
Michael Hussey	2006–07	4	0	4	0	0	0.00
Michael Clarke	2008–2015	74	50	21	0	3	67.57
Cameron White	2011	1	1	0	0	0	100.00
Shane Watson	2012–2013	9	5	3	1	0	61.11
George Bailey	2013–2015	29	16	10	0	3	61.53
Steve Smith	2015–2025	64	32	28	0	3	53.33
David Warner	2016	3	3	0	0	0	100.00
Aaron Finch	2017–2022	55	31	24	0	0	56.36
Tim Paine	2018	5	0	5	0	0	0.00
Alex Carey	2021	3	2	1	0	0	66.66
Pat Cummins	2022–2024	17	13	4	0	0	76.47
Josh Hazlewood	2022	1	1	0	0	0	100.00
Mitchell Marsh	2023–2025	15	7	8	0	0	46.66
Josh Inglis	2024–2024	1	0	1	0	0	0.00
Total	1970/71–present	1,019	617	358	9	35	63.16

== Shirt number history ==
S/N	Current	Past
1	Usman Khawaja	Mark Taylor (1995–1997)
2	Josh Philippe	Michael Slater (1995–1997), George Bailey (2012–2016)
3	Will Sutherland	David Boon (1995), Brett Dorey (2005–2006), Xavier Doherty (2010–2017)
4	Alex Carey	Paul Reiffel (1995–1999), Jason Gillespie (2000–2005), Doug Bollinger (2009–2017)
5	Matthew Short	Steve Waugh (1995–2002), Phil Jaques (2006–2007), Ben Cutting (2013–2014), Aaron Finch (2015–2022)
6	Sam Konstas	Mark Waugh (1995–2002), Dan Cullen (2006), Nathan Coulter-Nile (2013–2019)
7	Matt Renshaw	Ian Healy (1995–1997), Cameron White (2008–2018), Tim Paine (2019–2021)
8	Mitchell Marsh	Brendon Julian (1995–1999), Stuart Clark (2005–2009)
9	Cooper Connolly	Greg Blewett (1995–1999), Shaun Marsh (2008–2019)
10	Liam Scott	Stuart Law (1995–1999), Darren Lehmann (2004–2005), Peter Siddle (2009-2019)
11	Oliver Peake	Glenn McGrath (1995–2007), Dirk Nannes (2009–2010), Joel Paris (2016)
12	Nathan Ellis	Michael Bevan (1995–2004), Callum Ferguson (2009–2016)
13	Matthew Wade	Jason Gillespie (1995–2000), Simon Katich (2001–2006)
14	Marcus Harris	Ricky Ponting (1995–2012)
15	Xavier Bartlett	Craig McDermott (1995–1996), Wade Seccombe, Mark Cosgrove (2006), Joe Burns (2015–2020)
16	Nathan McSweeney	Michael Kasprowicz (1995-2005), Aaron Finch (2013–2015), Joe Mennie (2016)
17	Marcus Stoinis	Damien Fleming (1995–2001), Luke Pomersbach (2007), Brad Hodge (2005–2014)
18	Michael Neser	Adam Gilchrist (1996–2008), Jason Krejza (2011), James Muirhead (2014)
19	Scott Boland	Ryan Campbell (1997–1999), Simon Katich (2001–2005), Mick Lewis (2005–2006), Brett Geeves (2008–2009), James Pattinson (2011–2020)
20	Aaron Hardie	Shane Lee (1995–2001), Ben Hilfenhaus (2007–2016), Peter Nevill (2016)
21	Beau Webster	Justin Langer (1995–1997), Moises Henriques (2009–2021)
22	Mitchell Swepson	Jo Angel (1995-1998: Australia A) Ashley Noffke (2008), Xavier Doherty (2010–2015)
23	Jake Fraser-McGurk	Shane Warne (1995–2003), Michael Clarke (2005–2015), D'Arcy Short (2018–2020)
24	Jack Wildermuth	Dean Jones (1996: Australia A), Adam Dale (1996–2000), Brad Williams (2001–2004), Adam Voges (2007–2017)
25	Wes Agar	Darren Lehmann (1996–2003), Mitchell Johnson (2005–2015)
26	Tanveer Sangha	Shaun Young (1996-1998: Australia A) Marcus North (2009), Scott Boland (2016)
27	–	Matthew Elliott (1997), Clint McKay (2009–2014), Ben Dwarshuis
28	Lance Morris	Matthew Hayden (1995–2008), Glenn Maxwell (2012–2014), Gurinder Sandhu (2015–2022)
29	–	Ian Harvey (1997–2004), David Hussey (2008–2016), Peter Handscomb (2016–2023)
30	Pat Cummins	Damien Martyn (1995–2006), Graham Manou (2009)
31	David Warner	Brad Hogg (1997–2008)
32	Glenn Maxwell	Jamie Cox (1997), Shaun Tait (2007–2011)
33	Marnus Labuschagne	David Saker (1997), Shane Watson (2002–2015)
34	Riley Meredith	Andy Bichel (1996–2004), Luke Ronchi (2008), Cameron Boyce (2014–2016)
35	Brendan Doggett	Tom Moody (1996–2000), Ryan Campbell (2001–2003), Nathan Reardon (2014)
36	Todd Murphy	Michael Di Venuto (1996–1998), Tim Paine (2009–2019)
37	Billy Stanlake	Geoff Foley (1996-1997: Australia A), Shane Harwood (2009–2012)
38	Josh Hazlewood	Anthony Stuart (1997)
39	Jack Edwards	Andrew Symonds (1998-2004), James Hopes (2005–2010)
40	Mahli Beardman	Brad Young (1997–1999), Sam Heazlett (2017)
41	–	Paul Wilson (1997–1998), John Hastings (2010–2017)
42	Cameron Green	Simon Cook (1998: Australia A)
43	Cameron Bancroft	Gavin Robertson (1997–1998), Nathan Hauritz (2003–2016)
44	Nikhil Chaudhary	Jimmy Maher (1997), Gavin Robertson (1998), Mark Higgs (2000–2001), James Pattinson (2011), James Faulkner (2013–2017)
45	Spencer Johnson	Stuart MacGill (1999–2000), Ryan Harris (2009–2015)
46	Ashton Agar	Jimmy Maher (1997–2004)
47	Ben McDermott	Dene Hills (1998: Australia A), Kane Richardson (2013–2018)
48	Josh Inglis	Mike Hussey (1998–2012)
49	Steve Smith	Colin Miller (1998: Australia A), Michael Clarke (2002–2004)
50	Matthew Kuhnemann	Brad Hodge (1999-2000: Australia A), Chris Lynn
51	Joel Davies	Matthew Nicholson (1999: Australia A), Ben Dunk (2014–2017)
52	–	Gerard Denton (1999: Australia A), Michael Klinger (2017)
53	Nic Maddinson	Scott Muller (1999-2000: Australia A)
54	Peter Handscomb	Brad Williams (2000: Australia A), Dan Christian (2010–2023)
55	Kane Richardson	Daniel Marsh (2000: Australia A), Ben Laughlin (2009–2013)
56	Mitchell Starc	David Fitzgerald (2000 - Australia A)
57	–	Brad Haddin (2000–2015)
58	–	Brett Lee (2000–2015)
59	–	Nathan Bracken (2001–2011)
60	Jhye Richardson	
61	Mitchell Owen	Daniel Worrall (2016)
62	Travis Head	
63	Lachlan Shaw	Andrew Symonds (2004–2009), Adam Zampa (2016–2019)
64	Phil Hughes	Shirt number retired
65	Jason Behrendorff	
66	Jake Weatherald	Peter Forrest (2012)
67	Nathan Lyon	
68	Andrew Tye	
69	–	
70	Ashton Turner	
71	–	Brad Hogg (2014)
72	–	Steve O'Keefe (2010–2017), Matt Renshaw (2022–2023)
73	Hilton Cartwright	
74	–	
75	–	
76	Sam Harper	
77	Sean Abbott	
78	–	
79	–	
80	–	Fawad Ahmed (2013)
81	–	Travis Birt (2010–2012)
82	Ben Dwarshuis	
83	Gurinder Sandhu (Australia A)	
84	Oliver Davies (Australia A)	
85	Tim David	Shaun Tait (2016)
86	–	
87	–	
88	Adam Zampa	
89	–	
90	–	
91	–	
92	–	
93	Chris Green	
94	–	
95	Daniel Sams	
96	–	
97	–	
98	–	
99	–	Ben Rohrer (2013–2016), Chris Tremain (2016)

== See also ==
- List of Australian Test cricketers
- List of Australian Twenty20 International cricketers
- List of Australia One Day International cricket records
