= Edmund Edwards =

Australian cricketer

Personal information
- Full name: Edmund Keane Edwards
- Born: 6 January 1910; Perth, Western Australia
- Died: 18 August 1990 (aged 80); Perth, Western Australia
- Relatives: Ross Edwards (son)
- Source: Cricinfo, 19 October 2017

Edmund Keane Edwards (6 January 1910 – 18 August 1990) was an Australian cricketer. He played both his first-class matches in 1948/49, for Western Australia.
