= Bob Massie =

Australian cricketer

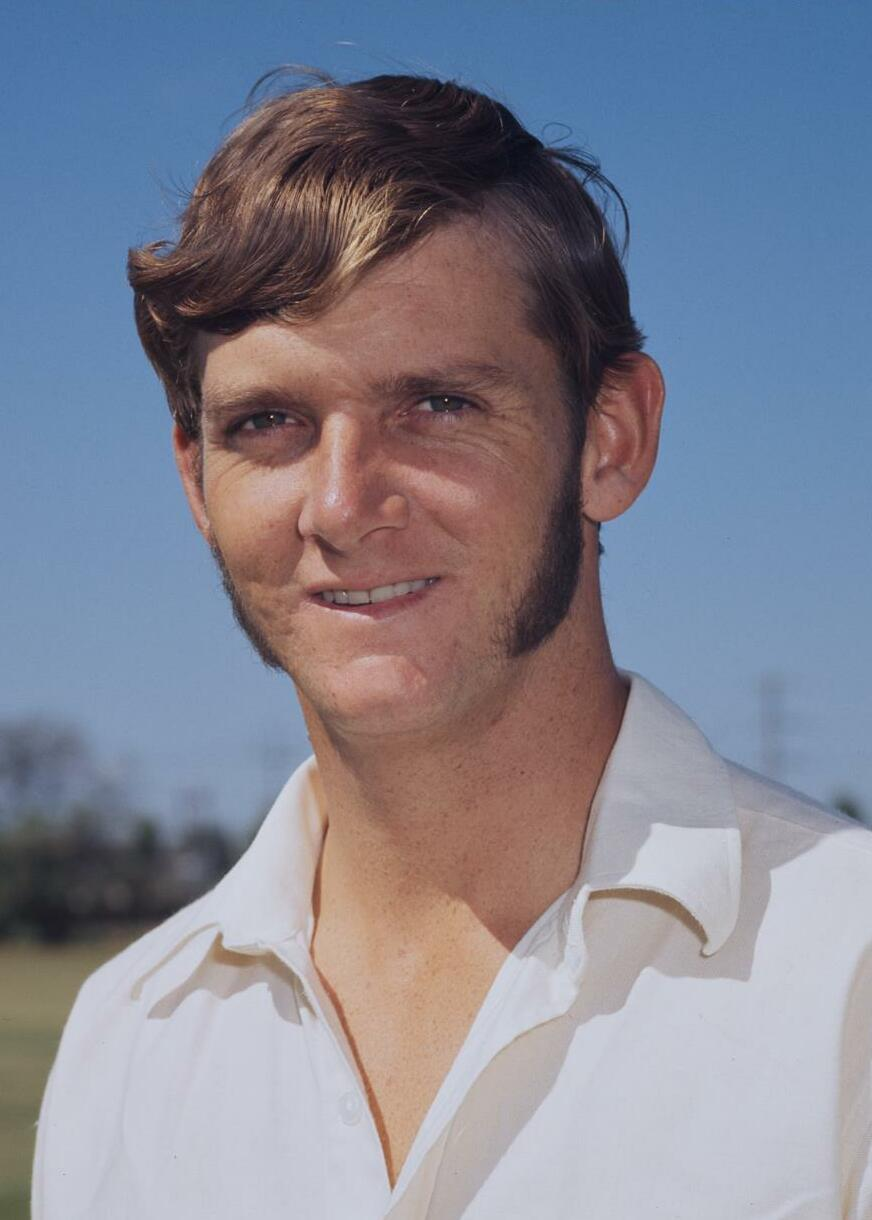
- Massie in 1972

Personal information
- Full name: Robert Arnold Lockyer Massie
- Born: 14 April 1947 (age 79); Subiaco, Western Australia
- Batting: Left-handed
- Bowling: Right-arm medium-fast

International information
- National side: Australia
- Test debut (cap 260): 22 June 1972 v England
- Last Test: 6 January 1973 v Pakistan
- ODI debut (cap 14): 24 August 1972 v England
- Last ODI: 28 August 1972 v England

Domestic team information
- Years: Team
- 1965/66–1974/75: Western Australia

Career statistics
Competition	Test	ODI	FC	LA
Matches	6	3	52	15
Runs scored	78	16	385	17
Batting average	11.14	–	9.62	17.00
100s/50s	0/0	0/0	0/0	0/0
Top score	42	16*	42	16*
Balls bowled	1,739	183	10,612	883
Wickets	31	3	179	17
Bowling average	20.87	43.00	24.83	25.23
5 wickets in innings	2	0	6	0
10 wickets in match	1	0	2	0
Best bowling	8/53	2/35	8/53	3/22
Catches/stumpings	1/–	1/–	8/–	4/–
- Source: CricketArchive, 23 October 2010

Robert Arnold Lockyer Massie (born 14 April 1947) is a former Australian cricketer who played in six Test matches and three One Day Internationals (ODIs) in 1972 and 1973.

A swing bowler, he had a relatively short international career but is remembered for a Test debut in 1972 at Lord's where he took eight wickets in each innings, with figures of 16/137 for the match. This was a world record for a Test debutant until India's Narendra Hirwani took 16 wickets for just 1 run fewer against the West Indies in 1987-88. The parallels go deeper – neither man enjoyed an extended Test career; between the two of them, they played fewer than 25 Test matches.

== Style ==
Massie was regarded for his work ethic and thinking ability. An upwind bowler, he was known for his ability to swing the ball late in both directions. His nickname was "Ferg" – from the well known tractor brand Massey Ferguson.

== Early years ==
The son of Arnold and Barbara Massie, Bob began playing cricket at age ten at the Bedford Park Youth Club, while a student at Hillcrest Primary School. He moved on to Mount Lawley Senior High School and joined Bassendean-Bayswater in Western Australia's club competition.

Massie made his debut for Western Australia against South Australia in 1965–66. He made a duck in his first innings and conceded 81 runs without taking a wicket. He did not play another Shield match for the season, nor did he play again for Western Australia that year, but went to join Kilmarnock in the Scottish league. He also trialled with Northamptonshire in English County cricket, but was not signed after he played two matches in the second XI for a total of 3/166.

== First class breakthrough ==
He was not to regain his state place until an away trip to the eastern seaboard in 1969. In his first match upon his return against South Australia, he took match figures of 4/75. His performance in the season was unspectacular, taking less than 15 wickets in the 1969–70 Australian season. When the touring England played Western Australia in the early stages of the 1970–71 season, Massie went wicketless and found his match opportunities restricted with Graham McKenzie back from international duty. He was recalled for a match against Queensland at the WACA Ground, taking match figures of 8/95 to ensure his place in the state side.

At the start of the 1971–72 Australian season he gained a position in the Australian team for the second match against the Rest of the World team in Melbourne which had been quickly organised after the touring South Africans were banned due to apartheid. Massie took three wickets. In the following match in Sydney, he took 7/76 in 21 overs including the scalp of Gary Sobers to secure his selection in the squad for the 1972 Ashes tour.

== 1972 Ashes tour and Test debut ==
Massie took 6/31 in the opening first class match of the tour against Worcester, but was not selected for the First Test due to injury. He took 8/84 and 8/53 in his Test debut in the Second Test at Lord's to square the series for Australia. His display of swing bowling yielded him the third best match figures of all time up to then, 16/137 (behind Jim Laker’s 19/90 and Sydney Barnes’ 17/159) and the best ever match figures on debut (later bettered by one run by Narendra Hirwani’s 16/136). Utilising his experience playing for Kilmarnock, he bowled a consistent line and length, stating "it could hardly have been better experience than to play on the soft wickets in the Scottish League". His performance was marked by a heavy emphasis on bowling around the wicket to the England batsmen. It was a tactic devised at Old Trafford where he bowled that way to his teammate Ross Edwards in the nets. He took 23 wickets at 17 in the Tests, twice taking five in an innings and once ten in a match. He was unable to replicate his form in the remaining matches, his best being 4/43 in the Third Test.

== End of career ==
Upon his return to Australia, he played only two more Tests in the 1972–73 season against Pakistan. He took eight wickets but it was his batting which attracted the most attention. With Australia faltering at 8/101 in its second innings in the Third Test, with only a 75 run lead, Massie combined with John Watkins to add 83. Massie made 42 and Australia managed to win the Test and the series. Massie's health failed him on the 1973 West Indies tour and he was unable to recover his swing and accuracy. He played only a further five first class matches before retiring.

Massie later became a cricket radio commentator.
