= Jeff Hammond (cricketer) =

Australian cricketer (born 1950)

Personal information
- Full name: Jeffrey Roy Hammond
- Born: 19 April 1950 (age 76); North Adelaide, South Australia
- Batting: Right-handed
- Bowling: Right-arm fast-medium
- Role: Bowler

International information
- National side: Australia
- Test debut (cap 265): 16 February 1973 v West Indies
- Last Test: 21 April 1973 v West Indies
- ODI debut (cap 18): 28 August 1972 v England
- Last ODI: 28 August 1972 v England

Domestic team information
- Years: Team
- 1969/70–1980/81: South Australia

Career statistics
Competition	Test	ODI	FC	LA
Matches	5	1	69	15
Runs scored	28	15	922	99
Batting average	9.33	–	16.46	14.44
100s/50s	0/0	0/0	0/1	0/0
Top score	19	15*	53	24
Balls bowled	1,031	54	11,036	869
Wickets	15	1	184	15
Bowling average	32.53	41.00	28.88	34.06
5 wickets in innings	0	0	8	0
10 wickets in match	0	0	0	0
Best bowling	4/38	1/41	6/15	3/33
Catches/stumpings	2/–	0/–	36/–	3/–
- Source: Cricinfo, 31 August 2011

Jeffrey Roy Hammond (born 19 April 1950) is a former Australian cricketer who played in five Test matches and one One Day International in 1972 and 1973.

A fast bowler, Hammond was described as having "raw pace, a great short ball and an ability to swing it away late from the right-handers." Hammond made his first-class cricket debut for South Australia in 1969 and was included in the Australian squad for the 1972 Ashes tour of England, where he played his sole One Day International, taking 1/41.

Hammond kept his place in the Australian squad picked for the tour of the West Indies, where, in the absence of the injured Dennis Lillee, he made his Test debut. The role of Hammond and his opening bowling partner Max Walker has been listed as a key factor in Australia's surprise series victory.

Following his retirement from cricket in 1980, Hammond was appointed South Australian coach in 1993, leading South Australia to the Sheffield Shield in 1995/96. He was appointed to the South Australian Cricket Association Board in 2007.

Hammond has a Diploma of Electronic Engineering and was a member of the Telecom Australia's Management team in the early 1990s before returning to cricket administration.

Hammond's son Ashley also played cricket for South Australia.
