= Keith Stackpole =

Australian cricketer (1940–2025)

Keith Stackpole MBE
Personal information
- Full name: Keith Raymond Stackpole
- Born: 10 July 1940; Collingwood, Victoria, Australia
- Died: 22 April 2025 (aged 84); Heidelberg, Victoria, Australia
- Batting: Right-handed
- Bowling: Leg break
- Role: Batsman
- Relatives: Keith Stackpole Sr. (father)

International information
- National side: Australia
- Test debut (cap 238): 26 January 1966 v England
- Last Test: 22 March 1974 v New Zealand
- ODI debut (cap 9): 5 January 1971 v England
- Last ODI: 31 March 1974 v New Zealand

Domestic team information
- Years: Team
- 1959–1974: Victoria

Career statistics
Competition	Test	ODI	FC	LA
Matches	43	6	167	16
Runs scored	2,807	224	10,100	522
Batting average	37.42	37.33	39.29	34.80
100s/50s	7/14	0/3	22/50	0/5
Top score	207	61	207	69
Balls bowled	2,321	77	14,102	240
Wickets	15	3	148	10
Bowling average	66.73	18.00	39.28	17.50
5 wickets in innings	0	0	2	0
10 wickets in match	0	0	0	0
Best bowling	2/33	3/40	5/38	3/14
Catches/stumpings	47/–	1/–	166/–	8/–
- Source: CricketArchive, 22 October 2010

Keith Raymond Stackpole MBE (10 July 1940 – 22 April 2025) was an Australian cricketer who played in 43 Test matches and six One Day Internationals between 1966 and 1974. He went on to become a cricket commentator on radio and television in the 1980s and '90s. His father, Keith Stackpole Sr. also played first-class cricket and was a noted Australian rules footballer for Collingwood and Fitzroy.

== Biography ==
Stackpole grew up in Collingwood in Melbourne's inner suburbs. The son of an accomplished sportsman and local cricket legend, Keith junior followed his father to the Collingwood Cricket Club in Melbourne’s district cricket competition. At age 16 he was selected for the Collingwood first XI in what was to be his father’s final game for the club after 20 years of service. Under the mentorship of Jack Ryder, he then made his Sheffield Shield debut for Victoria in Adelaide in 1962–63, contributing 83 against an attack that included Gary Sobers and Neil Hawke. He developed into a solid middle order batsman and handy leg spinner.

Stackpole was a big, heavy batsman in the Colin Milburn mould and quite capable of hitting the ball all over the ground, being especially strong off the back foot when hooking and cutting. He made his Test debut against England in the Fourth Test in Adelaide in 1965–66, where he took a great catch to dismiss Jim Parks, made 43 batting at number 8 and took the wickets of the England captain M.J.K. Smith and his vice-captain Colin Cowdrey with his leg spin, his 2/33 remaining his best Test figures. Australia won by an innings to square the series.

His debut Test century was made on the 1966–67 tour of South Africa, at Cape Town. Coming in at number 7, Stackpole compiled an aggressive 134 including 100 runs between lunch and tea, an innings Graeme Pollock described as "magnificent". He was given out on the last ball of the middle session when he headed off promptly for a deserved tea break, but Umpire George Goldman thought he had walked in response to a half hearted appeal for caught behind. The next day local newspapers claimed his stomach had cost him his wicket.

=== Opening for Australia ===
Under captain Bill Lawry, Stackpole was moved up to open the batting for Australia for the second test against the West Indies in 1968–69, and this transformed his career. He formed a potent opening partnership with Lawry, which featured contrasting batting styles: Stackpole’s cross batted attack on the short ball, versus Lawry’s dour and gritty application. The pair opened the innings for Australia 31 times in Tests, averaging 44.89 runs together. Stackpole's own average in tests when opening was 40.51 (64 innings, 2390 runs) versus 26.05 when batting in the middle order.

Stackpole was a key part of Australia’s successful tour of India in 1969, topping the averages with 368 runs at 46.

Against England in 1970–71 he was the main Australian runmaker with 627 runs (52.25). In the First Test Stackpole should have been run out for 18 as Geoff Boycott threw down the wicket at the bowler's end, but the batsman was given the benefit of the doubt by Lou Rowan. The Australian papers carried photographs the next day showing that he was clearly out and labelled the decision "one of the worst in cricket history". It probably cost England victory as Stackpole took advantage of his escape to pile up 207 – his highest Test score – in Australia's 433. Faced with an impossible 469 runs to win in the Sixth Test Stackpole made a powerful 136 with 16 boundaries to save the game, adding 202 for the second wicket with Ian Chappell (104) as Australia made 328–3 on the last day. In the Seventh and last Test Australia needed 223 to win and save the Ashes. Stackpole hit 2 sixes and 6 fours in his 67, but received little support from the rest of the team and they were all out for 160. On the eve of that seventh and final test, it was Stackpole and Ian Redpath who informed their Victorian team mate Bill Lawry that Lawry had been sacked as captain and dropped from the side, after the selectors did not have the decency to tell Lawry directly.

Stackpole played all five of the unofficial tests between Australia and the Rest of the World in 1971–72, a series put together to replace the South African tour of Australia that was cancelled because of opposition to apartheid. Opening the batting, he made 490 runs at an average of 54.44 including centuries at Brisbane and Sydney.

On the Ashes tour of England in 1972 he was Ian Chappell's vice-captain and made 485 runs (52.88), topping the Australian batting averages for the second series in a row and being named a Wisden Cricketer of the Year in 1973. When Dennis Lillee was struggling with injury early on in the tour, it was Stackpole who sought him out and provided what Lillee regarded as a huge amount of support at a time of great stress.

Stackpole toured the West Indies in 1972–73 as part of the victorious Australian side. In the first test at Sabina Park he made 44 and 142, and was particularly brutal against the up and coming fast bowler Uton Dowe, smashing Dowe all over the park. According to Jeff Hammond, the crowd turned against Dowe and a local wag held up a banner that said: "This is the 11th commandment. Dowe shall not bowl".

His final Test Match was against New Zealand at Eden Park, Auckland, in March 1974 and was notable for Stackpole making a pair including being dismissed on the very first ball of the match.

Universally known as “Stacky”, he played largely in a pre one-day international era, and was widely admired for his entertaining and attacking approach to batting. Reflecting on Stackpole’s retirement from Test Cricket, Ian Redpath wrote that “Undoubtedly Keith was the star of the Australian side until Greg Chappell hit his straps, and was one of the best crowd pullers not only in Tests, but also in State cricket.”. Rodney Hogg said that of all the players he ever bowled to, only two hooked him with total impunity: Viv Richards and Keith Stackpole.

=== After test career ===
After his test career was over, Stackpole won the Ryder Medal three times as the best player in Melbourne’s district cricket competition, playing for the Carlton Cricket Club. He was awarded an MBE in the 1974 Birthday Honours. He was selected in the Collingwood Cricket Club Team of the Century.

Stackpole commenced commentating during World Series Cricket, and proceeded to pursue a two-decade career in broadcasting with the Nine and Seven Networks, and the ABC, before retiring in 2005.

=== Death ===
Stackpole died on 22 April 2025, at the age of 84. He was survived by his wife, Pat, and children Peter, Tony and Angela.

Preceded by Ian Chappell	Highest Score by an Australian in ODI Cricket; 61 vs England at Birmingham 1972	Succeeded by Ian Chappell
