= Keith Stackpole (footballer) =

Australian rules footballer

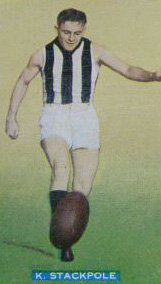

Personal information
- Born: 31 July 1916; Melbourne, Victoria
- Died: 19 September 1992 (aged 76); Heidelberg, Victoria
- Original team: Abbotsford
- Height: 165 cm (5 ft 5 in)
- Weight: 84 kg (185 lb)

Playing career^{1}
Years	Club	Games (Goals)
1935–1939	Collingwood	34 (26)
1939–1944	Fitzroy	84 (203)
Total		118 (229)
- ^{1} Playing statistics correct to the end of 1944.

Keith William Stackpole (31 July 1916 – 19 September 1992) was an Australian rules footballer who played with Collingwood and Fitzroy in the Victorian Football League (VFL).

Stackpole made his VFL debut in 1935 with Collingwood and played as a reserve in that year's winning Grand Final as well as their premiership triumph the following season. Due to the success of Collingwood the competition for a place in the side was tough and as a result he left the club for Fitzroy during the 1939 VFL season. Stackpole formed a strong partnership with fellow Fitzroy rover Allan Ruthven and his last game of football was their 1944 Grand Final win in which he kicked 2 goals.

After leaving the league Stackpole joined Victorian Football Association (VFA) club Prahran as captain and coach, kicking 85 goals in his first season. He also became a Victorian first-class cricketer, making 1025 runs at 34.16 from 20 matches. His son, also named Keith, played Test cricket for Australia.

== See also ==
- List of Victoria first-class cricketers
