= Graham Winter =

Australian cricketer (born 1955)

Personal information
- Born: 6 November 1955 (age 71); Adelaide, Australia
- Source: Cricinfo, 30 September 2020

Graham Winter (born 6 November 1955) is an Australian cricketer. He played in fourteen first-class and five List A matches for South Australia between 1978 and 1984.

== See also ==
- List of South Australian representative cricketers
