= Gary Goodman =

Australian cricketer (born 1953)

Personal information
- Full name: Gary Weech Goodman
- Born: 6 December 1953 (age 72); Sydney, New South Wales, Australia
- Batting: Right-handed
- Bowling: Right-arm off break

Domestic team information
- Years: Team
- 1980/81: South Australia
- 1978/79–1992/93: Tasmania

Career statistics
| Competition | First-class | List A |
|---|---|---|
| Matches | 33 | 13 |
| Runs scored | 1,437 | 353 |
| Batting average | 25.66 | 32.09 |
| 100s/50s | 1/9 | 1/1 |
| Top score | 123 | 100 |
| Balls bowled | 870 | 127 |
| Wickets | 5 | 1 |
| Bowling average | 98.40 | 89.00 |
| 5 wickets in innings | 0 | 0 |
| 10 wickets in match | 0 | 0 |
| Best bowling | 1/6 | 1/18 |
| Catches/stumpings | 17/– | 3/– |
- Source: Cricinfo, 2 January 2011

Gary Weech Goodman (born 6 December 1953 in Sydney, New South Wales) is a former cricketer who played for Tasmania and South Australia. He was the chief executive of ACT Cricket for four years.

Goodman was a right-handed batsman and occasional off-break bowler who represented Tasmania from 1978 until 1980, before playing for South Australia from 1980 to 1983 and returning to play for Tasmania until 1992–93, playing his last representative match for Tasmania at age 39. He commenced his cricket career with the St George Cricket Club in Sydney at the age of 16, winning the Junior Cricketer of the Year Award for four consecutive seasons. He also played in 23 Grand Finals winning 18 of the 23 with various cricket Clubs (Sth. Hurstville RSL CC, St George DCC, Petersham Marrickville DCC, Burnie CC, Devonport CC, Launceston CC, Newtown CC, Sunderland CC (UK), Brighouse CC (UK), Darlington CC (UK), Uddingston CC (Scot), Yorkshire 2nd XI, Leicestershire 2nd XI) and spanning a career from 1966 to 1992–93.

He was known for scoring a century in his first match for Tasmania against Queensland at the Gabba in 1978 and a successful team member of the first Tasmanian Cricket Team to win a National Title in the Gillette Cup. However, after a few inconsistent performances with both the bat and the ball and a serious head injury in 1985, he was overlooked for Test selection. He had senior administration and teaching roles with the Australian Sports Commission; New South Wales, Tasmanian and South Australian Education systems; was CEO of the Tasmanian and Australian Capital Territory Cricket Associations where he was instrumental in developing with the Australian Football League the new Manuka Oval and new Sir Donald Bradman Stand. He also played a major role as National Director of the powerful valuation and lobby group, The Australian Property Institute (2001–2002) and as National Project Manager for MAXIhomes Australia (2003–2005).

Goodman is Development Officer, Senior Teacher of Health and Physical Education and Master in Charge of Senior Cricket and Senior Coach of the Associated Southern Colleges First XI Premiership Cricket Team at historic Marist College Canberra, ACT Australia and Head Cricket Coach of the historic Eastlake Cricket Club in the ACT Grade competition.

== See also ==
- List of Tasmanian representative cricketers
