= Rest of the World cricket team in Australia in 1971–72 =

World XI Cricket team in Australia 1971-72
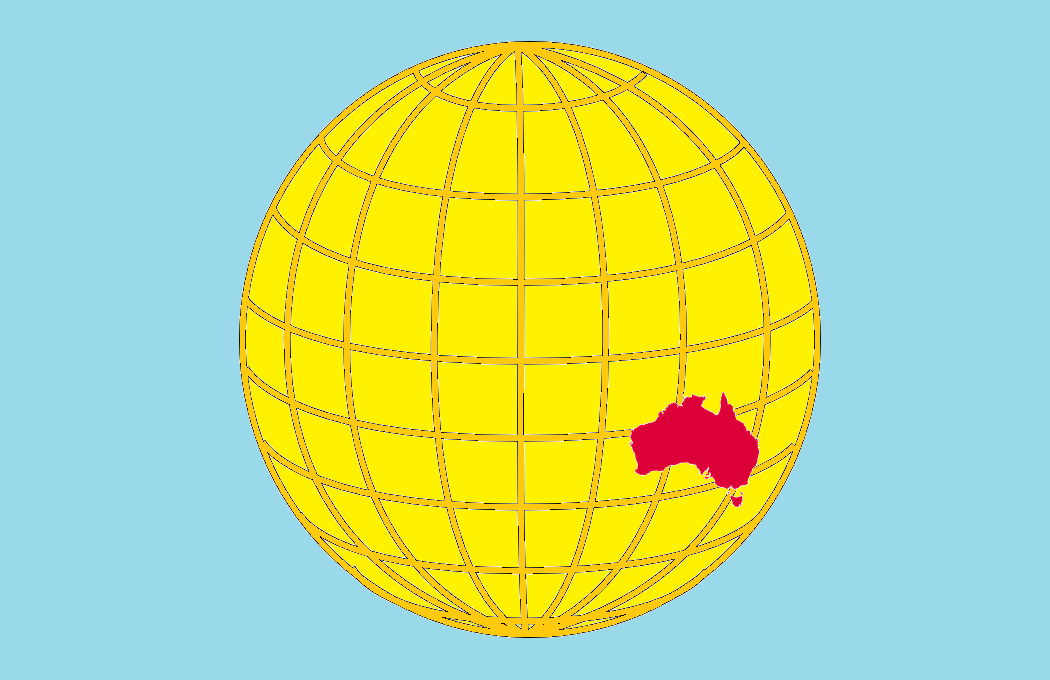
	World XI	Australia
- Dates: November 1971 – February 1972
Captains	Gary Sobers	Ian Chappell

Test series
- Result: World XI won the 5-match series 2–1
Most runs	Gary Sobers (341); Hylton Ackerman (323)	Ian Chappell (634); Greg Chappell (425)
Most wickets	Intikhab Alam (19); Bishan Bedi (17)	Dennis Lillee (24); Bob Massie (11)

A World XI cricket team, which was a multi-national captained by Gary Sobers, toured Australia in the 1971–72 season. It replaced the proposed Test tour by South Africa which the Australian Cricket Board had cancelled in 1971. This meant that South Africa would not tour Australia for a test series again until the 1993–94 season.

World XI played 16 matches between early November 1971 and early February 1972. There were five matches against Australia which were regarded as official test matches in Wisden however the status was later withdrawn. World XI won this series 2–1. The team also played three limited overs internationals against Australia and the remaining games were first-class fixtures against Australian invitational and state teams.

After this series, World XI would not play in Australia again until World Series Cricket in the late 1970s.

== The team ==
The World XI cricket team which played in Australia in 1971–72
Players of various nations made up the team;

Player	Date of birth	Batting style	Bowling style	Nation/Region
Gary Sobers (c)	28 July 1936	Left handed	Left-arm fast medium	Barbados West Indies
Zaheer Abbas	24 July 1947	Right-handed	Right-arm offbreak	Pakistan
Hylton Ackerman	28 April 1947	Left-handed	Right-arm medium	South Africa
Intikhab Alam	28 December 1941	Right-handed	Right arm leg break	Pakistan
Bishan Bedi	25 September 1946	Right-handed	Slow left-arm orthodox	India
Robert Cunis	5 January 1941	Right-handed	Right-arm fast-medium	New Zealand
Farokh Engineer	25 February 1938	Right-handed	Wicket-keeper	India
Sunil Gavaskar	10 July 1949	Right-handed	–	India
Norman Gifford	30 March 1940	Left-handed	Slow left-arm orthodox	England
Tony Greig	6 October 1946	Right-handed	Right-arm medium	England
Richard Hutton	6 September 1942	Right-handed	Right-arm fast-medium	England
Rohan Kanhai	26 December 1935	Right-handed	Right-arm medium	Guyana West Indies
Clive Lloyd	31 August 1944	Left-handed	Right-arm medium	Guyana West Indies
Asif Masood	23 January 1946	Right-handed	Right-arm medium-fast	Pakistan
Graeme Pollock	27 February 1944	Left-handed	Leg break	South Africa
Peter Pollock	30 June 1941	Right-handed	Right-arm fast	South Africa
Robert Taylor	17 July 1941	Right-handed	Wicket-keeper	England

== "Test" series summary ==
=== First match ===
26 November–1 December 1971 (5–day match)
Scorecard

Australia	v	World XI
389/4d (85 overs); IM Chappell 145; BS Bedi 1/53 (8 overs)		285/4d (63 overs); HM Ackerman 112; KJ O'Keeffe 1/36 (8 overs)
220/3d (58 overs); IM Chappell 106; GS Sobers 1/7 (4 overs)		108/4 (35 overs); Zaheer Abbas 32; DK Lillee 2/38 (9 overs)

Match drawn
Brisbane Cricket Ground, Woolloongabba, Brisbane
Umpires: TF Brooks and LP Rowan

- World XI won the toss and elected to field.
- 29 November was taken as a rest day.
- There was no play on the second day.
- BC Francis made his first-class debut for Australia.

=== Second match ===
10–12 December 1971 (5–day match)
Scorecard

Australia	v	World XI
349 (72.3 overs); KD Walters 125; AW Greig 4/94 (13.3 overs)		59 (14.1 overs); Zaheer Abbas 14; CH Lloyd 14; DK Lillee 8/29 (7.1 overs)
		279 (f/o) (71.3 overs); RB Kanhai 118; DK Lillee 4/63 (14 overs)

Australia won by an innings and 11 runs
WACA Ground, Perth
Umpires: LP Rowan and NE Townsend

- Australia won the toss and elected to bat.
- The match was scheduled for five days but completed in three.

=== Third match ===
1–6 January 1972 (5–day match)
Scorecard

World XI	v	Australia
184 (49.3 overs); AW Greig 66; DK Lillee 5/48 (16.3 overs)		285 (71.6 overs); GS Chappell 115*; AW Greig 4/41 (16 overs)
514 (124.3 overs); GS Sobers 254; TJ Jenner 4/87 (20.3 overs)		317 (76 overs); KD Walters 127; BS Bedi 4/81 (24 overs)

World XI won by 96 runs
Melbourne Cricket Ground, Melbourne
Umpires: JR Collins and MG O'Connell

- World XI won the toss and elected to bat.
- 4 January was taken as a rest day.
- J Benaud and RAL Massie made their first-class debuts for Australia.

=== Fourth match ===
8–13 January 1972 (5–day match)
Scorecard

Australia	v	World XI
312 (69.2 overs); KR Stackpole 104; BS Bedi 4/85 (20 overs)		277 (69.6 overs); Intikhab Alam 73*; RAL Massie 7/76 (20.6 overs)
546 (102.4 overs); GS Chappell 197*; Intikhab Alam 4/132 (24.4 overs)		173/5 (48 overs); HM Ackerman 87; KJ O'Keeffe 3/34 (12 overs)

Match drawn
Sydney Cricket Ground, Sydney
Umpires: TF Brooks and PR Enright

- Australia won the toss and elected to bat.
- 11 January was taken as a rest day.
- There was no play on the final day.

=== Fifth match ===
28 January–1 February 1972 (5–day match)
Scorecard

Australia	v	World XI
311 (91.3 overs); J Benaud 99; AW Greig 6/30 (15.3 overs)		367 (109.5 overs); RG Pollock 136; AA Mallett 4/116 (34.5 overs)
201 (55.5 overs); IM Chappell 111*; Intikhab Alam 4/78 (19 overs)		146/1 (41.6 overs); HM Ackerman 79*; RJ Inverarity 1/52 (12 overs)

World XI won by 9 wickets
Adelaide Oval, Adelaide
Umpires: TF Brooks and LP Rowan

- Australia won the toss and elected to bat.
- 30 January was taken as a rest day.
- The match was scheduled for five days but completed in four.
- AJ Woodcock made his first-class debut for Australia.

== Matches ==
No.	Date	Opponents	Fixture	Venue	City	Result	Ref
1	5–8 November	Victoria	Tour match	MCG	Melbourne	Drawn	
2	12–15 November	New South Wales	Tour match	SCG	Sydney	Drawn	
3	19–22 November	Queensland	Tour match	The Gabba	Brisbane	Won by 38 runs	
4	26 November–1 December	Australia	1st "Test match"	The Gabba	Brisbane	Drawn	
5	4–7 December	Western Australia	Tour Match	WACA Ground	Perth	Won by 72 runs	
6	10–12 December	Australia	2nd "Test match"	WACA Ground	Perth	Lost by an innings and 11 runs	
	12 December	Australia	Fill-up match	WACA Ground	Perth	Won by 14 runs	
	14 December	Australia	1st "ODI"	WACA Ground	Perth	Won by 44 runs	
7	17–18 December	South Australia	Tour match	Adelaide Oval	Adelaide	Lost by an innings and 1 run	
8	22–24 December	Tasmania	Tour match	NTCA Ground	Launceston	Won by 8 wickets	
9	26–28 December	Tasmania Combined XI	Tour match	TCA Ground	Hobart	Drawn	
10	1–6 January	Australia	3rd "Test match"	MCG	Melbourne	Won by 96 runs	
11	8–13 January	Australia	4th "Test match"	SCG	Sydney	Drawn	
	15 January	Australia	2nd "ODI"	SCG	Sydney	Abandoned due to rain	
	16 January	Australia	3rd "ODI"	MCG	Melbourne	Lost by ten wickets	
	16 January	Australia	Fill-up match	MCG	Melbourne	Lost by 6 runs	
	18–19 January	Southern New South Wales	Tour match	Manuka Oval	Canberra	Drawn	
	22–24 January	Northern New South Wales	Tour match	No. 1 Sports Ground	Newcastle	Drawn	
12	28 January–1 February	Australia	5th "Test"	Adelaide Oval	Adelaide	Won by nine wickets	
