= Jeff Moss (cricketer) =

Australian cricketer (born 1947)

Personal information
- Full name: Jeffrey Kenneth Moss
- Born: 29 June 1947 (age 79); Melbourne, Victoria, Australia
- Batting: Left-handed
- Role: Batsman

International information
- National side: Australia
- Only Test (cap 305): 24 March 1979 v Pakistan
- ODI debut (cap 55): 13 June 1979 v Pakistan

Domestic team information
- Years: Team
- 1976/77–1982/83: Victoria

Career statistics
Competition	Test	ODI	FC	LA
Matches	1	1	51	17
Runs scored	60	7	3,416	276
Batting average	60.00	7.00	43.79	18.40
100s/50s	0/0	0/0	9/14	0/2
Top score	38*	7	220	76
Balls bowled	–	–	75	–
Wickets	–	–	0	–
Bowling average	–	–	–	–
5 wickets in innings	–	–	–	–
10 wickets in match	–	–	–	–
Best bowling	–	–	–	–
Catches/stumpings	0/–	2/–	33/–	10/–
- Source: CricketArchive, 15 August 2012

Jeffrey Kenneth Moss (born 29 June 1947) is a former Australian cricketer who played in one Test matches and one One Day International (ODI) in 1979.

An opening batsman, Moss made his first-class cricket debut for Victoria in 1976/77 and was a steady contributor for Victoria without attracting the interest of national selectors until Australia lost many of its leading players to World Series Cricket (WSC). Moss was picked for the last Test of the 1978–79 series against Pakistan. However he was not selected for the subsequent 1979 tour of India, and dropped out of contention altogether when the WSC players returned to test cricket for the summer of 1979–80.

Moss along with Julien Wiener had a partnership of 390 at the Junction Oval against Western Australia in 1981–82. This still stands as a record for the third wicket for Australians in first-class cricket.

He is married to Victorian Member of Parliament Cindy McLeish.

== See also ==
- One Test Wonder
