= Ross Edwards (cricketer) =

Australian cricketer (born 1942)

Personal information
- Born: 1 December 1942 (age 83); Cottesloe, Western Australia
- Batting: Right-handed
- Role: Batsman, wicket-keeper
- Relatives: Edmund Edwards (father)

International information
- National side: Australia
- Test debut (cap 259): 22 June 1972 v England
- Last Test: 28 August 1975 v England
- ODI debut (cap 12): 24 August 1972 v England
- Last ODI: 21 June 1975 v West Indies

Domestic team information
- Years: Team
- 1964/65–1974/75: Western Australia
- 1979/80: New South Wales

Career statistics
Competition	Test	ODI	FC	LA
Matches	20	9	126	30
Runs scored	1,171	255	7,345	550
Batting average	40.37	36.42	39.27	27.50
100s/50s	2/9	0/3	14/42	0/3
Top score	170*	80*	170*	80*
Balls bowled	12	–	84	–
Wickets	0	–	1	–
Bowling average	–	–	75.00	–
5 wickets in innings	–	–	0	–
10 wickets in match	–	–	0	–
Best bowling	–	–	1/24	–
Catches/stumpings	7/–	0/–	111/11	14/0
Medal record
Men's Cricket
Representing Australia
ICC Cricket World Cup
Runner-up	1975 England
- Source: CricketArchive, 18 July 2012

Ross Edwards (born 1 December 1942) is a former Australian cricketer. Edwards played in 20 Test matches for Australia, playing against England, West Indies and Pakistan. He also played in nine One Day Internationals. He was a part of the Australian squad which finished as runners-up at the 1975 Cricket World Cup. He was a right-handed batsman and superb cover fielder as well as a part-time wicket-keeper.

Edwards was born on 1 December 1942 in Cottesloe, Western Australia. His father, Edmund Edwards, played twice for Western Australia as a wicket-keeper.

In the 1971–72 Sheffield Shield season he made four centuries and went to England in 1972 at the age of 29 and got his first chance at Nottingham where he made an unbeaten 170. He made ducks in his next two innings however.

In 1974–75 Edwards scored his second century against England when he hit 115 in the Perth Test match. He made 99 at Lord's in 1975.
