= Dennis Lillee =

Australian cricketer

Dennis Lillee AM MBE
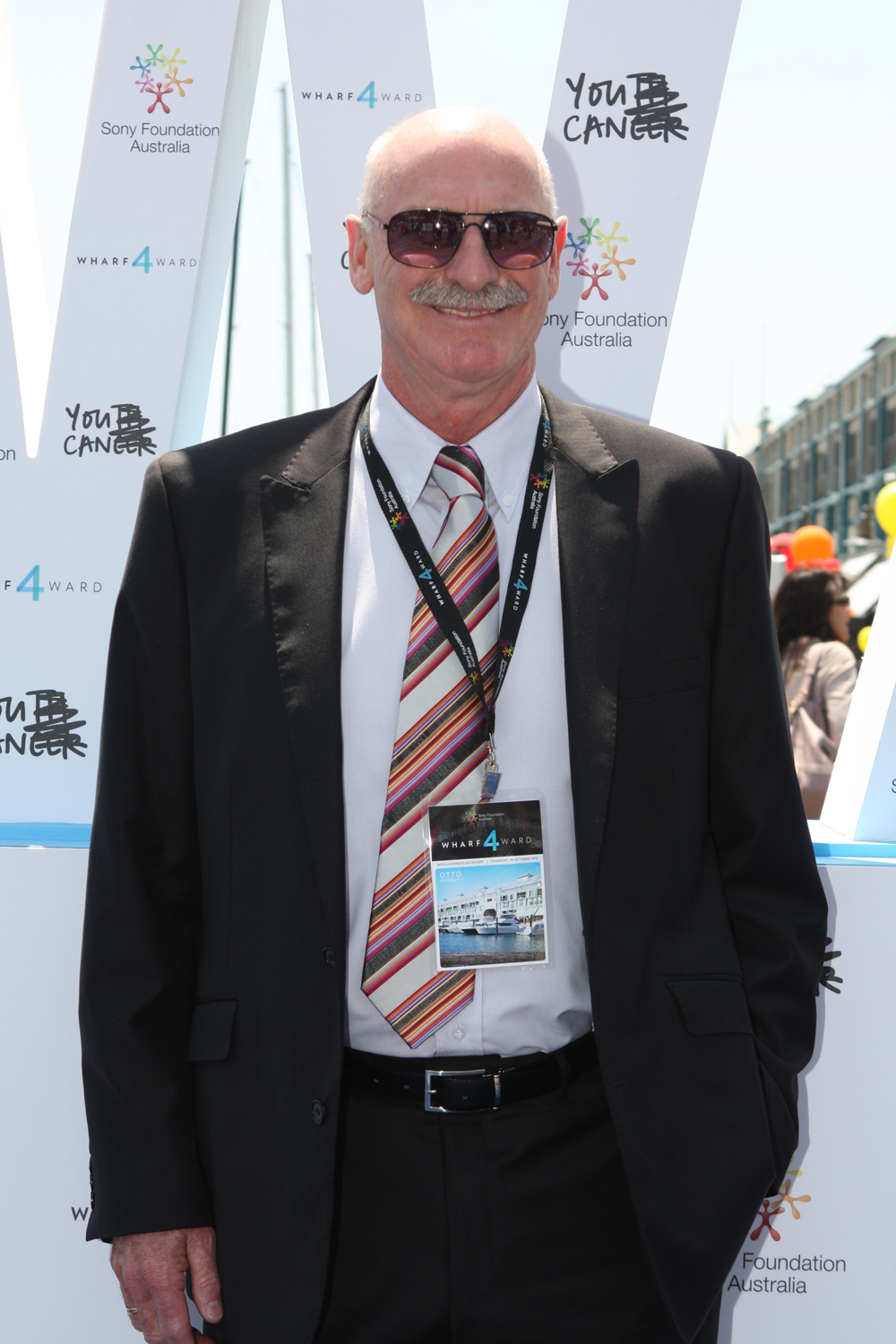
- Lillee at the Sony Foundation's Youth Cancer campaign

Personal information
- Full name: Dennis Keith Lillee
- Born: 18 July 1949 (age 77); Subiaco, Western Australia
- Nickname: FOT
- Height: 1.82 m (6 ft 0 in)
- Batting: Right-handed
- Bowling: Right-arm fast
- Role: Bowler

International information
- National side: Australia
- Test debut (cap 254): 29 January 1971 v England
- Last Test: 2 January 1984 v Pakistan
- ODI debut (cap 13): 24 August 1972 v England
- Last ODI: 18 June 1983 v West Indies

Domestic team information
- Years: Team
- 1969/70–1983/84: Western Australia
- 1987/88: Tasmania
- 1988: Northamptonshire

Career statistics
Competition	Test	ODI	FC	LA
Matches	70	63	198	102
Runs scored	905	240	2,337	382
Batting average	13.71	9.23	13.90	8.68
100s/50s	0/1	0/0	0/2	0/0
Top score	73*	42*	73*	42*
Balls bowled	18,467	3,593	44,806	5,678
Wickets	355	103	882	165
Bowling average	23.92	20.82	23.46	19.75
5 wickets in innings	23	1	50	1
10 wickets in match	7	0	13	0
Best bowling	7/83	5/34	8/29	5/34
Catches/stumpings	23/–	10/-	67/–	17/–
Medal record
Men's Cricket
Representing Australia
ICC Cricket World Cup
Runner-up	1975 England
- Source: CricketArchive, 14 January 2009

Dennis Keith Lillee, AM, MBE (born 18 July 1949) is a retired Australian cricketer rated as the "outstanding fast bowler of his generation". Lillee formed a new ball partnership with Jeff Thomson, which is recognised as one of the greatest bowling pairs of all time.

In the early part of his career Lillee was an extremely fast bowler, but a number of stress fractures in his back almost ended his career. Taking on a strict fitness regime, he fought his way back to full fitness, eventually returning to international cricket. By the time of his retirement from international cricket in 1984 he had become the world record holder for most Test wickets with 355, and had firmly established himself as one of the most recognisable and renowned Australian sportsmen of all time. He was a part of the Australian squad which finished as runners-up at the 1975 Cricket World Cup.

In a fan poll conducted by the CA in 2017, he was named in the country's best Ashes XI of the previous 40 years. On 17 December 2009, Lillee was inducted into the ICC Cricket Hall of Fame.

He is the subject of the song "Water Lillee" on Lord Kitchener's 1976 album Home for Carnival.

== Cricket career ==
Aged 20, Lillee made his first-class debut for Western Australia in 1969–70 and impressed with his raw pace. Lillee took 32 wickets in his debut season to be WA's leading wicket-taker. At the end of the season, he toured New Zealand with an Australian second team and took 18 wickets at 16.44 average.

=== Early career ===
The following season, Lillee made his Test debut in the Sixth Test at Adelaide in the 1970–71 Ashes series, taking 5/84 from 28.3 eight-ball overs. His first Test wicket was John Edrich, caught by Keith Stackpole for 130, but it was not until the Seventh Test at Sydney that John Hampshire became the first batsman to be "caught Marsh, bowled Lillee". The following season, during the series against the Rest of the World XI, which had been arranged in place of the cancelled series against South Africa, Lillee announced himself during the first innings of the second unofficial "Test" match at his home ground in Perth, destroying a powerful batting lineup that included Garry Sobers, Clive Lloyd, Rohan Kanhai and Sunil Gavaskar to finish with 8/29 in only 7 overs, which would remain his career-best bowling figures in an innings. Sobers would later comment that as far as particular spells went, Lillee's bowling that day was the fastest he had ever faced. Lillee then backed up with 4/63 in the second innings to end with match figures of 12/92 as Australia won by an innings.

Lillee followed this performance with a successful Ashes tour of England in 1972, when he "asserted himself as a great bowler". In a series that ended 2–2, he was the outstanding bowler on either team, taking 31 wickets at an average of 17.67. This earned him selection as one of Wisden's five Cricketers of the Year for 1973.

John Snow believes that Lillee saw reduced effectiveness after being overbowled by Western Australia and Australia in 1971–73.

=== Back injury ===
During a Test against Pakistan in the 1972–73 season, Lillee felt sharp pain in his back for the first time, but continued to play. On the tour of the West Indies that followed, Lillee broke down completely and was diagnosed with stress fracture in his lower vertebrae. Forced out of cricket, he spent six weeks during the winter of 1973 wearing a plaster cast that encased his entire torso. After the removal of the cast, he played club cricket for Perth as a specialist batsman. He returned to the bowling crease towards the end of the season, guiding Perth Cricket Club to the final at the WACA Ground.

There was speculation that his bowling career was nearly over. Lillee persevered, undergoing an intensive physiotherapy routine, formulated by sports scientist Frank Pyke, and remodelling his bowling action. In 1974–75, he returned to Test cricket for the Ashes series and was paired with New South Wales fast bowler Jeff Thomson to form one of the most effective opening bowling combinations in Test cricket. The pair was a major factor in Australia's emphatic 4–1 victory. In 1975, the University of Western Australia timed Lillee's bowling at 154.8 km/h.

=== Lillee and Thomson ===
The impact of the Lillee/Thomson bowling attack was summarised during the 1974–75 Ashes series, when Sydney newspaper The Sunday Telegraph ran a photo of Lillee and Thomson with a cartoon caption underneath that read:

Ashes to Ashes, dust to dust, if Thomson don't get ya, Lillee must.

Lillee toured England again in 1975. During the inaugural World Cup he captured eight wickets in five matches, including 5/34 against Pakistan at Leeds, which was the first five wicket haul in ODIs. His aggressive bowling was not always suited to the run-containing style required in the one-day game. In the subsequent four-Test series against England, Lillee claimed 21 wickets as his team finished winners by 1–0. With the bat, he made 73 not out at Lord's to rescue Australia from a difficult situation.

Another 27 wickets (at 26.37 average) followed in the summer of 1975–76 against the West Indies. At this time, Lillee was one of the most marketable personalities in Australia, but he was frustrated by the small amounts that he earned from the game. Outspoken in his opinions, he came into conflict with the game's administrators. Lillee suggested that a made-for-television exhibition series could be played each season with profits given to the players. John Cornell, his manager, took this idea to Kerry Packer, who later fashioned it into World Series Cricket (WSC).

An injury to Thomson early in 1976–77 forced Lillee to take on a greater workload during the six Tests of the season. He responded with 47 wickets including match figures of 10/135 against Pakistan at the MCG and 11/123 at Auckland against New Zealand. In the Centenary Test, his 11/165 was the decisive performance in Australia's victory. However, the extra exertion created "hot spots" in his back and not wanting to reaggravate his previous condition, he made himself unavailable for the 1977 tour of England.

=== World Series Cricket ===
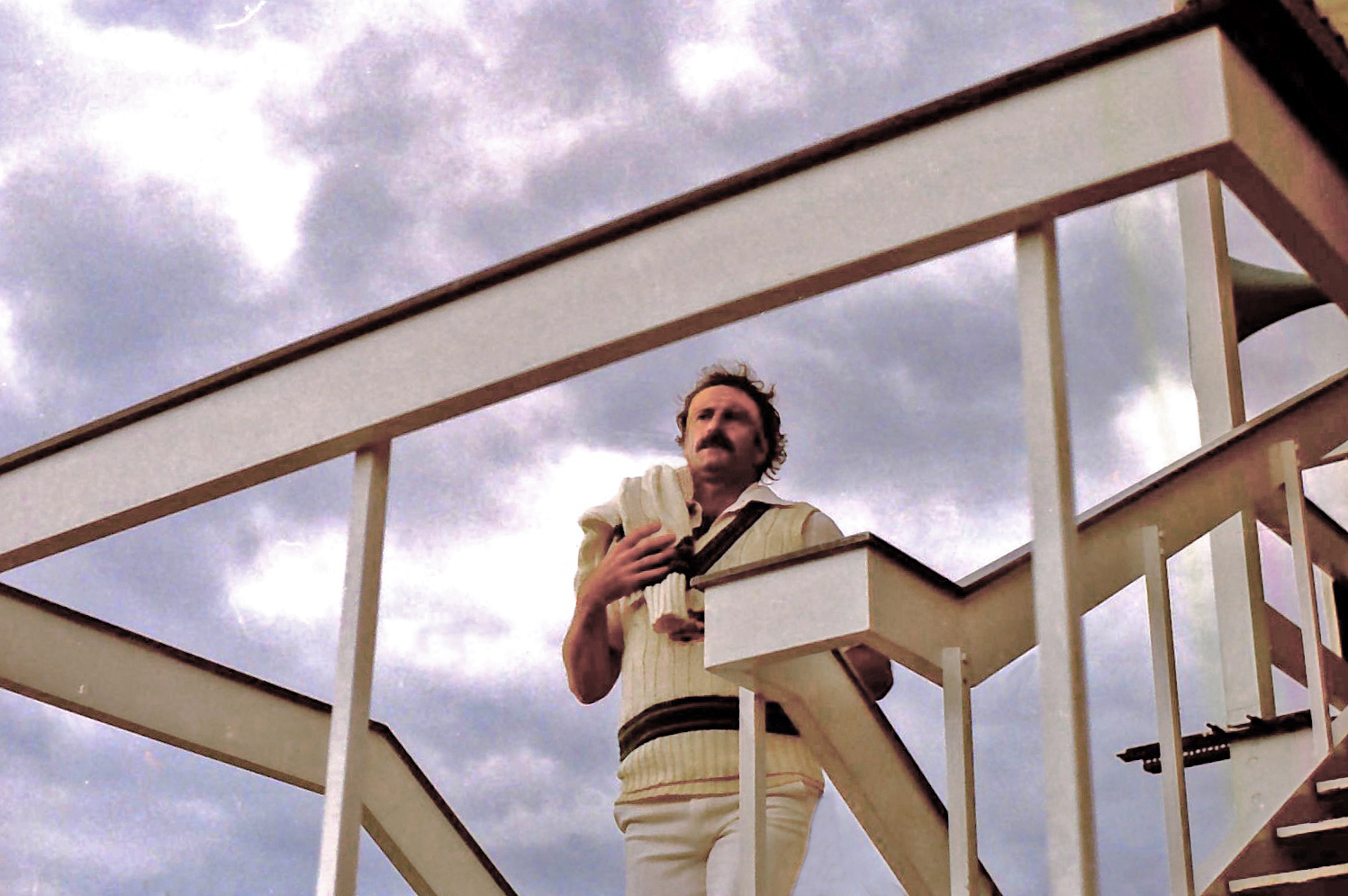
Lillee at Headingley Cricket Ground in 1981.

Remaining in Australia to do television commentary on the tour, Lillee was isolated from the furore in England surrounding the plans for the breakaway professional competition, WSC. He was announced as one of the WSC players in May 1977. The Lillee image and personality were key components in WSC's innovative marketing of their games. However, he struggled on-field during the first season of WSC and in the winter of 1978 made further adjustments to his action. He also spent time working with ex–World professional sprint champion Austin Robertson Sr., improving his running technique and fitness. In nine "Supertests" (four in Australia and five in the West Indies) during 1978–79, Lillee captured 46 wickets at 22.5 average, with a best of 7/23 against the West Indies XI at the SCG.

Cutting down his pace and the length of his run up, Lillee now concentrated on moving the ball off the seam with an occasional faster or slower ball for variation. During the season of his return to official cricket, Lillee collected 35 Test wickets in six matches against the West Indies and England, and gave Australia's bowling attack stability while the selectors experimented with the team. In the World Series Cup, his changed style helped to bring him 20 wickets (at 12.7 average) in eight ODIs, including 4/12 against West Indies and 4/28 against England, both at the SCG. However, the tour of Pakistan that followed was ruined for Lillee by flat batting pitches prepared by local groundsmen to blunt his effectiveness. He managed just three wickets in three Tests.

=== Australian and world records ===
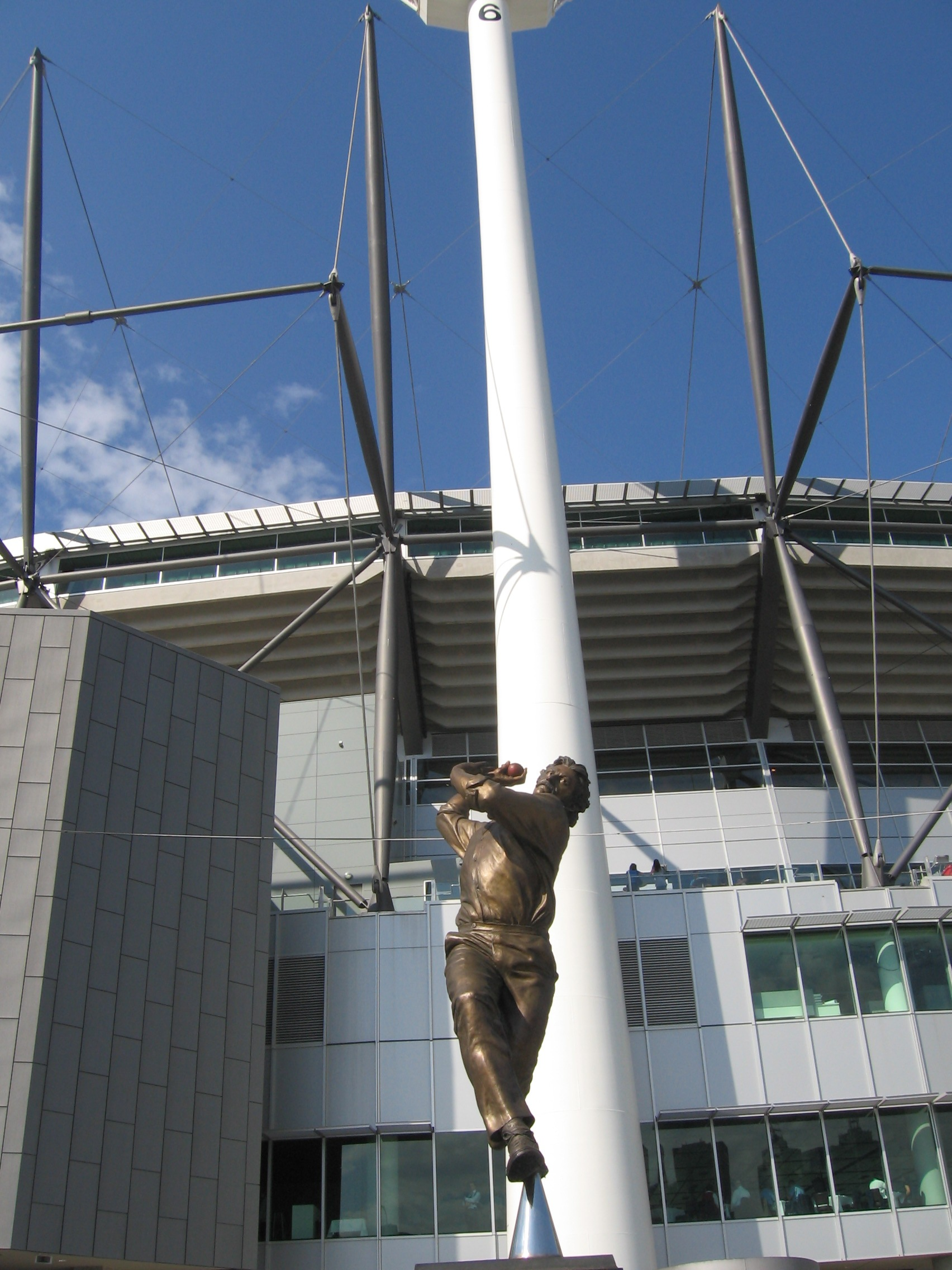
Statue of Lillee at the Melbourne Cricket Ground

Against New Zealand and India in 1980–81, Lillee took 37 wickets in six Tests and was the leading bowler in the World Series Cup for the second successive season. He contributed 25 wickets to Australia's first victory in the competition. After breaking Richie Benaud's Australian Test record of 248 wickets, Lillee toured England in 1981 when his preparation was compromised by a viral infection. A return of 39 Test wickets (at 22.30) for series was the best of his career and he won man of the match awards in the first and last Tests. Lillee formed a penetrative partnership with fellow West Australian Terry Alderman, who claimed an Australian record of 41 wickets in that series. Despite possessing this potent attack, Australia lost the series by 1–3 when Ian Botham turned in a series of brilliant individual performances. Yet, these efforts led him to achieve the number 1 ranking in ICC Test Bowling Rankings for the year 1981.

Granted a testimonial for 1981–82, Lillee's season got off to a poor start when he was involved in the infamous incident with Javed Miandad (see below) in the first Test of the summer. Suspended for two ODIs, the level of his on-field aggression was again criticised. However, he continued taking wickets: 15 in three Tests against Pakistan and 16 in three Tests against the West Indies. Against the latter, his 7/83 and 3/44 at the MCG in the first Test took him past the world record for the most Test wickets held by Lance Gibbs. His ODI season was less successful, with 12 wickets in 12 games. His best effort was 2/18 in ten overs against the West Indies during the third final of the World Series Cup, the only match in the final series Australia was able to win.

=== Retirement ===
Bowling as a first-change, Lillee had an uneventful tour of New Zealand in March and April 1982 before suffering a serious knee injury in the first Ashes Test at the WACA Ground in November of the same year. This forced him to miss the rest of the series and Australia's 2–1 victory, which reclaimed the Ashes. Returning to the team for the latter stages of the World Series Cup, Lillee was no longer an automatic choice to take the new ball. Nevertheless, his 11 wickets in six ODIs helped Australia win the tournament with a victory over New Zealand in the final.

His wicket-taking capacity was diminishing. During Australia's brief tour of Sri Lanka in 1983, Lillee took three wickets at Kandy in the inaugural Test between the two nations and went wicketless in two ODIs. Later in the year, his ODI career finished during the third World Cup in England when he conceded 52 runs from 12 overs in the match against the West Indies at Lord's. Dropped from the team, Lillee acknowledged that he was not fully fit.

During the first two Tests of 1983–84 against Pakistan at Perth, he took only one wicket and looked set to be dropped from the Test team as well. Fate intervened when Carl Rackemann, the man of the match from the second Test, was injured. This allowed Lillee to play the rest of the Test series and he finished with 20 wickets at 31.65. Greg Chappell and Lillee announced their retirement from cricket on January 3 and 4, respectively, during the final Test at Sydney, where Lillee took eight wickets, including a wicket with his last delivery in the match.

=== Caught Marsh bowled Lillee ===
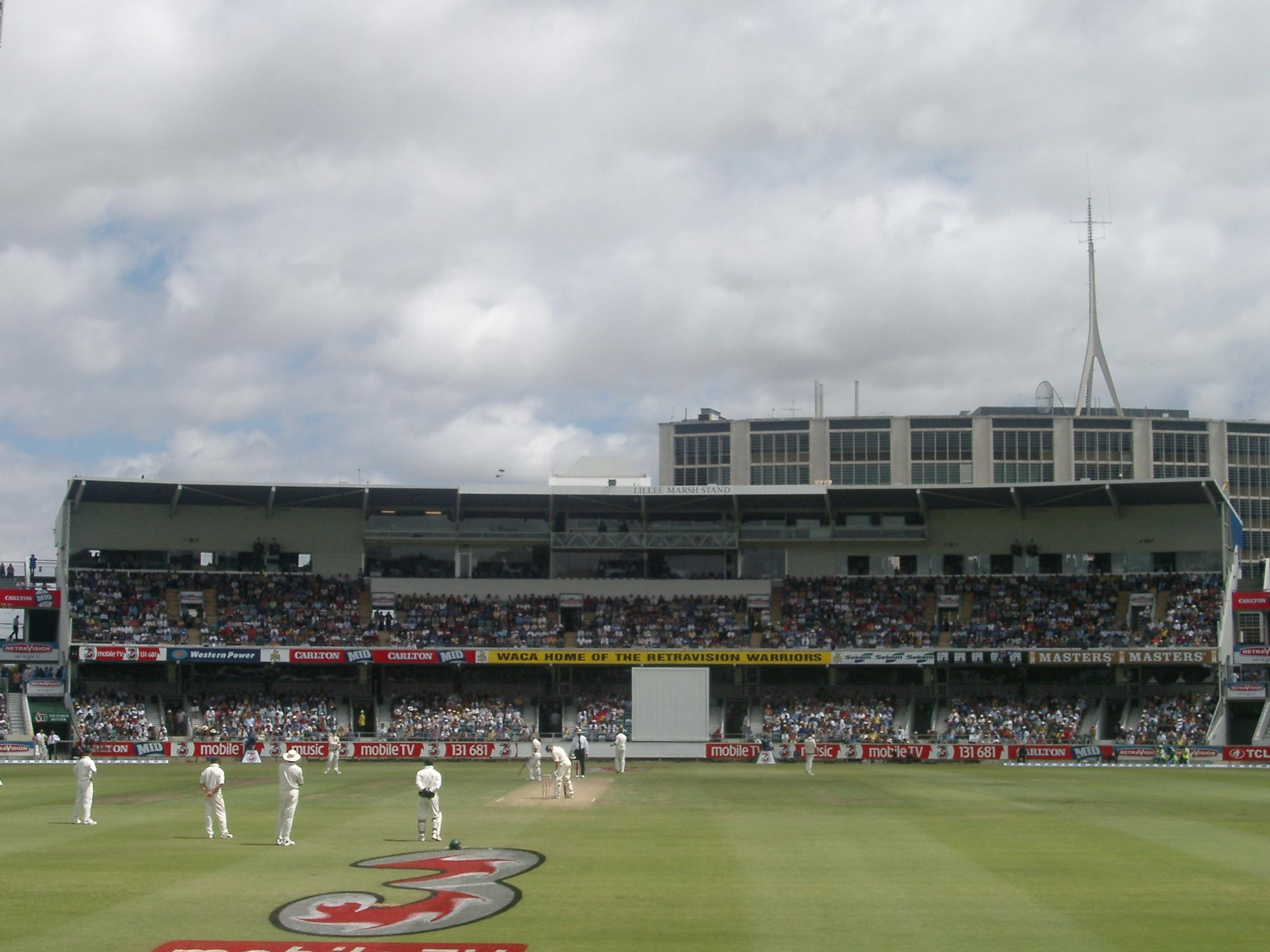
The Lillee-Marsh Stand at the WACA Ground

Throughout his career, whilst playing for both Australia and Western Australia, Lillee was also famous for his partnership with wicket-keeper Rod Marsh. The scorecard entry 'c Marsh b Lillee' appeared 95 times in Tests, a partnership record between wicket-keeper and bowler that is yet to be broken. Coincidentally, both players ended their careers with 355 Test dismissals; Marsh took 343 catches and had 12 stumpings. In 1988 the Western Australian Cricket Association honoured the two players by naming a new grandstand at the WACA Ground the Lillee-Marsh Stand.

Most successful bowler & wicketkeeper/fielder combinations in Test cricket
! Team	Bowler	WK or Fielder*	Matches	Wickets
Australia	Dennis Lillee	Rod Marsh	69	95
Australia	Glenn McGrath	Adam Gilchrist	71	90
South Africa	Makhaya Ntini	Mark Boucher*	96	84
Australia	Brett Lee	Adam Gilchrist	65	81
South Africa	Shaun Pollock	Mark Boucher	88	79

Statistics correct at 26 February 2015. Source:

== Controversy ==
=== Aluminium bat incident ===
During a Test at the WACA Ground in December 1979 between Australia and England, Lillee went to the crease with an aluminium bat manufactured by a company owned by a friend. There were no rules against using such a bat, but trouble began when Lillee hit a ball that went for three runs. Australian captain Greg Chappell thought that the ball should have gone for a four, and instructed Rodney Hogg to deliver a conventional wooden bat to Lillee. As this was happening, English captain Mike Brearley complained to the umpires that using such a bat was against the spirit of the game and that it was damaging the ball.

Lillee refused to change the bat. Brearley, Lillee, and the umpires held an animated discussion for almost ten minutes, before Chappell insisted that Lillee should change bats. In a fit of pique, Lillee threw "the offending lump of metal fully 40 yards towards the pavilion", and grudgingly took the wooden bat. He was not disciplined by the ACB for this incident. After the game, sales of the bat skyrocketed for a few months, before the laws of the game were amended, specifying that bats had to be made from wood.

=== Betting ===
At Headingley on the 1981 tour of England, Australia was in such a strong position at one stage of the third Test that bookmakers at the ground were offering odds of 500–1 against an England victory. These odds were flashed on the scoreboard during a break in the game and noticed by the Australian players. Lillee and Rod Marsh believed that the odds were so ludicrous that, via a third party, they each put a small wager on the outcome, later describing their actions as a "joke". Between them, they collected 7,500 pounds when England pulled off a comeback victory. Both men openly discussed the incident and received no official censure or sanction, although some criticised their actions. There has never been a suggestion that the bets compromised their efforts in the game. The issue has been re-examined in modern times following the match-fixing scandals that have plagued international cricket since the mid-1990s.

== After retirement ==
Lillee made a brief comeback to first-class cricket in 1987–88 for Tasmania, taking a wicket with his first ball. In 1988, he played eight matches for English county team Northamptonshire before suffering a severe ankle injury. In his autobiography, Lillee claimed that he played again as a preparation for a possible comeback to the Australian team that was suggested by the then captain Allan Border.

Since retirement Lillee has dedicated himself to mentoring and coaching young bowlers, most notably Brett Lee, Shaun Tait, Mitchell Johnson, and Pat Cummins. He was also associated with MRF Pace Foundation in India. Lillee continued playing cricket until 1999 for the traditional Australian Cricket Board President's XI match against touring teams at Lilac Hill. In his final match he took three wickets and played alongside his son Adam.

From 2004 until his sudden resignation in September 2015, Lillee was the president of the Western Australian Cricket Association.

== Legacy ==
- He was one of the Wisden Cricketers of the Year in 1973.
- He was appointed a Member of the Order of the British Empire (MBE) in 1981 for services to cricket.
- He was one of the ten inaugural inductees into the Australian Cricket Hall of Fame in 1996.
- He was selected in the official Australian Test Team of the Century.
- He was awarded the Australian Sports Medal in 2000.
- He was appointed a Member of the Order of Australia (AM) in the 2010 Australia Day Honours.
- Lillee was inducted into the Sport Australia Hall of Fame in 1985.
- He was immortalised in the Men at Work song "No Restrictions" (Cargo, 1983) with the line: "Hear the cricket calling, switch on the TV, sit and stare for hours, and cheer Dennis Lillee".
- He was also mentioned in the Iain Campbell Smith song "Blue Guitar". In a lyric where the narrator is describing unlikely, fantastic events he sings "I hit a six off Dennis Lillee and I clean bowled Gavaskar". When performing in the United States, Smith will often change the lyric to "I scored thirty-seven points off of Kareem Abdul-Jabbar."
- He was named as a bowler in Australia's "greatest ever ODI team."
- He was named an Australia Post Legend of Cricket in 2021.
- He was elevated as the 43rd Legend in the Sport Australia Hall of Fame in 2021.

== Footnotes ==
Records
Preceded by Lance Gibbs	Most career wickets in Test cricket 355 wickets (23.92) in 70 Tests; Held record 27 December 1981 to 21 August 1986	Succeeded by Ian Botham
