= WSC World XI cricket team in Australia in 1977–78 =

In World Series Cricket

World XI in Australia
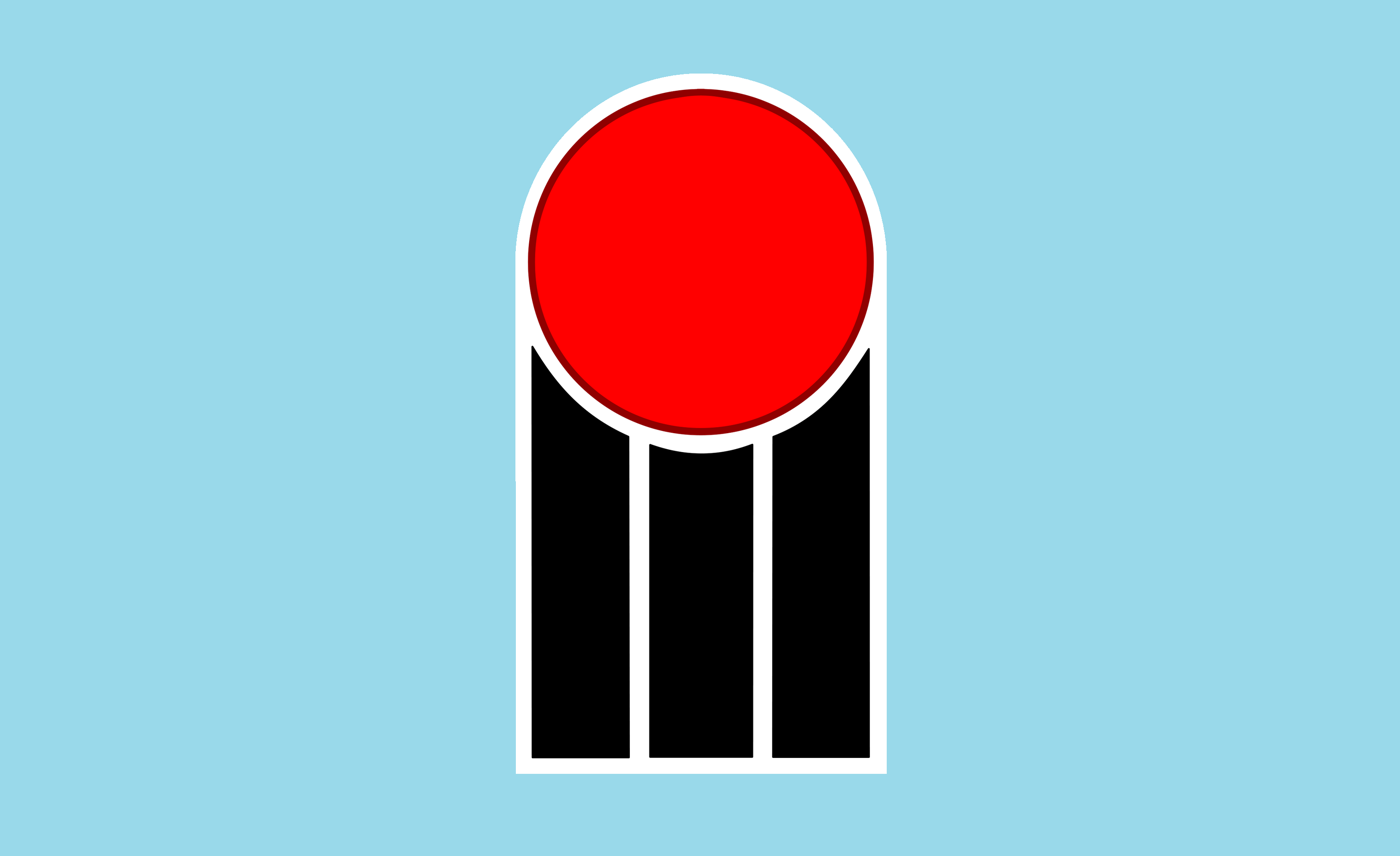
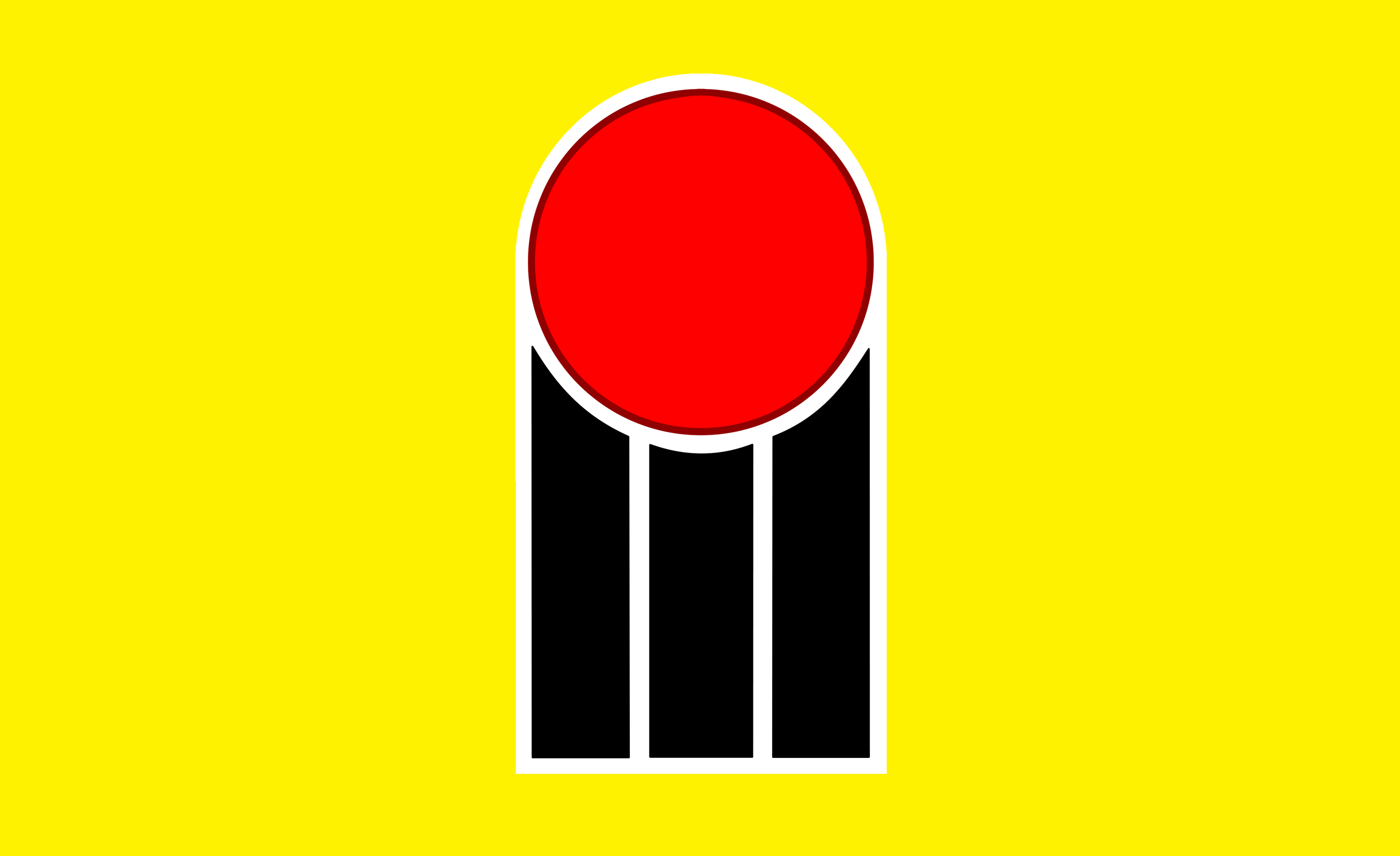
	World XI	Australia
- Dates: 14 January 1978 – 13 February 1978
Captains	Tony Greig	Ian Chappell

Test series
- Result: World XI won the 3-match series 2–1
Most runs	Viv Richards 502	Greg Chappell 621
Most wickets	Imran Khan 16	Max Walker 23

In late 1977, the new World Series Cricket (WSC) competition began in Australia between three teams playing both multi-day and one day games. The first set of these fixtures to be played was a three match series between the Australian team and the World XIs team, starting at the beginning of December.

== Background ==
In 1977–78, the WSC World XI were scheduled to play six Supertests, three against the WSC Australians, three against the WSC West Indians. The series was preceded by a test-equivalent trial match was held at VFL Park in Melbourne.

== Trial match ==
24–27 November 1977
scorecard

Australia	v	World XI
8/276d ( overs); Ian Chappell 118* (312); Derek Underwood 4/66 (19 overs)		148 (41.2 overs); Collis King 52 (90); Wayne Prior 3/30 (10 overs)
7/325d (76.4 overs); Ian Redpath 152; Albert Padmore 4/119 (20.4 overs)		3/122 (25.7 overs); Collis King 56 (76); Dennis Lillee 2/46 (8 overs)

Match drawn
VFL Park, Melbourne

- World XI won the toss and elected to field
- 4-day match

== Supertests ==
Because the Marylebone Cricket Club held the copyright to the Laws of Cricket, Kerry Packer was therefore prevented from using them, so he recruited former Australian captain Richie Benaud to formulate the rules and conditions for the new competition, which led to each over consisting of 8 balls.

=== First Supertest ===
14–19 January 1978
scorecard

Australia	v	World XI
304 (82.7 overs); Bruce Laird 106 (235); Mike Procter 4/33 (9.7 overs)		290 (74.3 overs); Viv Richards 119 (206); Max Walker 7/88 (28.3 overs)
128 (28.4 overs); Martin Kent 31 (47); Andy Roberts 6/69 (12 overs)		6/145 (27.5 overs); Gordon Greenidge 50 (104); Gary Gilmour 4/26 (4 overs)

World XI won by 4 wickets
RSA Showground, Sydney
Umpires: Douglas Sang Hue and Jack Collins

- Australia won the toss elected to bat
- 6-day match

=== Second Supertest ===
27–30 January 1978
scorecard

World XI	v	Australia
625 (114.3 overs); Barry Richards 207 (234); Ray Bright 5/149 (31.3 overs)		393 (92.4 overs); Greg Chappell 174 (281); Andy Roberts 3/65 (17 overs)
		159 (47 overs); Ross Edwards 39 (67); Imran Khan 4/24 (7 overs)

World XI won by an innings and 73 runs
Gloucester Park, Perth
Umpires: Gary Duperouzel and Peter Enright

- 5-day match

=== Third Supertest ===
9–13 February 1978
scorecard

Australia	v	World XI
6/538d (100.5 overs); Greg Chappell 246* (291); Imran Khan 3/134 (21.3 overs)		434 (86.1 overs); Viv Richards 170 (226); Len Pascoe 3/113 (24 overs)
167 (35.7 overs); David Hookes 53 (63); Joel Garner 5/52 (14.7 overs)		230 (44 overs); Alan Knott 41* (39); Max Walker 5/62 (14 overs)

Australia won by 41 runs
VFL Park, Melbourne
Umpires: Douglas Sang Hue and Jack Collins

- Australia won the toss and elected to bat first
- 5-day match
