= World Series Cricket results =

World Series Cricket results are the results of the main games played in the now defunct World Series Cricket (WSC) competition. World Series Cricket was a break away professional cricket competition staged between 1977 and 1979, organized by Kerry Packer for his Australian television network, the Nine Network. The matches ran in opposition to established international cricket. World Series Cricket drastically changed the nature of cricket, and its influence continues to be felt today.

WSC involved a three-way competition between the Australians, West Indians, and World XI, a team composed of players from the other cricketing nations, although a number of West Indian players also played in the World team when they were not playing for the West Indies. Towards the end of the competition a fourth team named the Cavaliers was added for the Country Cavaliers Tour. It was composed of players not selected by the other three sides for that rounds' fixtures; this was a way of making better use of all the players contracted to the competition.

== Origin ==
The series originated due to two main factors—the widespread view that players were not paid sufficient amounts to make a living from cricket, and that Packer wished to secure the exclusive broadcasting rights to Australian cricket, then held by the Australian Broadcasting Corporation (ABC). After the Australian Cricket Board (ACB) refused to accept Channel Nine's bid to gain exclusive television rights to Australia's Test matches in 1976, Packer set up his own series by secretly signing agreements with leading players from the national cricket teams of Australia, England, Pakistan, South Africa, and the West Indies.

Official cricket won a series of minor victories. WSC was unable to officially call the Australian team "Australia", or use the official rules of cricket, which are copyright of the MCC. The Australian team therefore became the "WSC Australia XI" for legal purposes, and former Australian captain and leading commentator Richie Benaud took the job of writing rules and playing conditions for the series. WSC was also shut out of traditional cricket venues, so Packer leased two Australian football stadiums, VFL Park in Melbourne and Football Park in Adelaide, a trotting track in Perth, Gloucester Park, and the Sydney Showground.

== 1977–78 ==
Another of the victories of official cricket was to ban WSC from using the term "Test match". The five-day matches were therefore retitled "Supertests" in WSC.

=== Supertests ===
The Supertests for the 1977–78 season were five-day matches. Two separate series were played, West Indies vs Australia, and World XI vs Australia.

==== West Indies vs Australia ====
2–4 December 1977
scorecard

Australia	v	West Indies
256 (56.2 overs); Ray Bright 69; Michael Holding 4/60 (12 overs)		214 (49 overs); Viv Richards 79; Len Pascoe 3/70 (14 overs)
192 (36.6 overs); David Hookes 63; Andy Roberts 4/52 (13 overs)		7/237 (50.7 overs); Viv Richards 56; Max Walker 3/43 (13 overs)

West Indies won by 3 wickets
VFL Park, Melbourne, Victoria
Umpires: Jack Collins and Douglas Sang Hue

16–18 December 1977
scorecard

Australia	v	West Indies
251 (56 overs); David Hookes 81; Andy Roberts 3/48 (15 overs)		336 (65.2 overs); Viv Richards 88; Max Walker 3/71 (13 overs)
182 (44.2 overs); Rick McCosker 56; Joel Garner 4/58 (13 overs)		1/101 (16.5 overs); Roy Fredericks 49; Len Pascoe 1/31 (5.7 overs)

West Indies won by 9 wickets
RAS Showground, Sydney, New South Wales
Umpires: Gary Duperouzel and Peter Enright

31 December 1977 – 3 January 1978
scorecard

Australia	v	West Indies
388 (105.2 overs); Ian Chappell 141; Andy Roberts 3/67 (20.2 overs)		145 (39.7 overs); Gordon Greenidge 40; Greg Chappell 5/20 (12 overs)
8/267 dec (75 overs); Bruce Laird 106; Collis King 4/78 (19 overs)		290 (62.3 overs); Viv Richards 123; Ray Bright 4/74 (20 overs)

Australia won by 220 runs
Football Park, Adelaide, South Australia
Umpires: Gary Duperouzel and Douglas Sang Hue

West Indies won the series 2–1.

==== World XI vs Australia ====
14–19 January 1978
scorecard

Australia	v	World XI
304 (82.7 overs); Bruce Laird 106; Mike Procter 4/33 (9.7 overs)		290 (74.3 overs); Viv Richards 119; Max Walker 7/88 (28.3 overs)
128 (28.4 overs); Martin Kent 31; Andy Roberts 6/69 (12 overs)		6/145 (27.5 overs); Gordon Greenidge 50; Gary Gilmour 4/26 (4 overs)

WSC World XI won by 4 wickets
RAS Showground, Sydney, New South Wales
Umpires: Jack Collins and Douglas Sang Hue

27–30 January 1978
scorecard

Australia	v	World XI
393 (92.4 overs); Greg Chappell 174; Andy Roberts 3/65 (17 overs)		675 (114.3 overs); Barry Richards 207; Ray Bright 5/149 (31.3 overs)
159 (47 overs); Ross Edwards 39; Imran Khan 4/24 (7 overs)

World XI won by an innings and 73 runs
Football Park, Adelaide, South Australia
Umpires: Gary Duperouzel and Peter Enright

9–13 February 1978
scorecard

Australia	v	World XI
6/538 dec (100.5 overs); Greg Chappell 246*; Imran Khan 3/134 (21.3 overs)		434 (86.1 overs); Viv Richards 170; Ray Bright 3/98 (22 overs)
167 (35.7 overs); David Hookes 53; Joel Garner 5/52 (14.7 overs)		230 (44 overs); Alan Knott 41; Max Walker 5/62 (14 overs)

Australia won by 41 runs
VFL Park, Melbourne, Victoria
Umpires: Jack Collins and Douglas Sang Hue

World XI won the series 2–1.

=== International Cup ===
The International Cup consisted of one-day limited overs matches, with both sides allocated forty overs of eight balls each. Two points were awarded for a win, one for a no result or abandonment. If points were level, combined run rate would determine position. The two top two sides contested the first semi-final. The winner of that match progressed to the final, while the loser played the bottom side in the second semi-final for the other place in the final. The final was a one-off winner-takes-all match.

Team	Pts	Pld	W	L	A	RR
West Indies	11	8	5	2	1	5.84
World XI	7	8	3	4	1	5.07
Australia	6	8	2	4	2	5.01

10 December 1977
Scorecard

World XI; 9/204 (40 overs)	v	Australia; 155 (34.2 overs)
Tony Greig 59; Max Walker 3/38 (8 overs)		Rick McCosker 38; Derek Underwood 4/31 (6 overs)

World XI won by 49 runs
Football Park, Adelaide, South Australia

11 December 1977
Scorecard

Australia; 8/203 (40 overs)	v	West Indies; 4/204 (33.5 overs)
Greg Chappell 45; Andy Roberts 2/26 (8 overs)		Roy Fredericks 64; Max Walker 1/45 (8 overs)

West Indies won by 6 wickets
Football Park, Adelaide, South Australia

24 December 1977
Scorecard

World XI; 7/248 (40 overs)	v	West Indies; 182 (32.2 overs)
Barry Richards 95; Andy Roberts 3/27 (8 overs)		Clive Lloyd & David Holford 31; Tony Greig 3/36 (6 overs)

World XI won by 66 runs
VFL Park, Melbourne, Victoria

26 December 1977
Scorecard

Australia	v	World XI

Match abandoned without a ball bowled
VFL Park, Melbourne, Victoria

27 December 1977
Scorecard

Australia; 1/12 (3.1 overs)	v	West Indies
Rick McCosker 8* Michael Holding 1/7 (2 overs)

No result
VFL Park, Melbourne, Victoria

28 December 1977
Scorecard

World XI; 184 (39.4 overs)	v	West Indies; 5/187 (35.7 overs)
Barry Richards 39; Michael Holding 2/14 (7.4 overs)		Collis King 62; Tony Greig 1/25 (4 overs)

West Indies won by 5 wickets
Football Park, Adelaide, South Australia

7 January 1978
Scorecard

Australia; 121 (28 overs)	v	West Indies; 4/123 (24.1 overs)
Greg Chappell 29; Joel Garner 4/32 (6 overs)		Viv Richards 54; Gary Gilmour 2/46 (8 overs)

West Indies won by 6 wickets
Gloucester Park, Perth, Western Australia

8 January 1978
Scorecard

World XI; 9/145 (30 overs)	v	Australia; 7/146 (27.1 overs)
Dennis Amiss 47; Max Walker 3/19 (6 overs)		Greg Chappell 87; Imran Khan 3/13 (5 overs)

Australia won by 3 wickets
Gloucester Park, Perth, Western Australia

9 January 1978
Scorecard

World XI; 130 (35.2 overs)	v	West Indies; 2/131 (20.3 overs)
Asif Iqbal 39; Wayne Daniel 3/22 (8 overs)		Gordon Greenidge 75; John Snow 1/23 (6 overs)

West Indies won by 8 wickets
Gloucester Park, Perth, Western Australia

21 January 1978
Scorecard

Australia; 8/224 (40 overs)	v	West Indies; 5/225 (34.2 overs)
Ian Davis 69; Michael Holding 2/28 (6 overs)		Jim Allen 83; Doug Walters 1/13 (3 overs)

West Indies won by 5 wickets
RAS Showground, Sydney, New South Wales

22 January 1978
Scorecard

West Indies; 7/235 (40 overs)	v	World XI; 8/236 (39.4 overs)
Collis King 96*; Eddie Barlow 2/18 (3 overs)		Bob Woolmer 60; Collis King 2/34 (8 overs)

World XI won by 2 wickets
RAS Showground, Sydney, New South Wales

23 January 1978
Scorecard

Australia; 9/193 (38 overs)	v	World XI; 9/138 (29.1 overs)
Ian Davis 50; Derek Underwood 3/48 (8 overs)		Asif Iqbal 59; Gary Gilmour 3/41 (6.1 overs)

Australia won by 9 runs (revised target)
VFL Park, Melbourne, Victoria

1st Semi-Final

3 February 1978
Scorecard

West Indies; 188 (37 overs)	v	World XI; 166 (36.7 overs)
Collis King 65; Imran Khan 3/28 (7 overs)		Tony Greig 46; Andy Roberts 5/17 (8 overs)

West Indies won by 22 runs
RAS Showground, Sydney, New South Wales

2nd Semi-Final

4 February 1978
Scorecard

World XI; 128 (29 overs)	v	Australia; 4/129 (28.6 overs)
Zaheer Abbas 57; Max Walker 2/23 (6 overs)		Greg Chappell 36*; John Snow 1/19 (5 overs)

Australia won by 6 wickets
RAS Showground, Sydney, New South Wales

Final

5 February 1978
Scorecard

West Indies; 124 (26.5 overs)	v	Australia; 99 (18.7 overs)
Gordon Greenidge 51; Len Pascoe 3/21 (6 overs)		David Hookes 29; Wayne Daniel 5/29 (5.7 overs)

West Indies won by 25 runs
RAS Showground, Sydney, New South Wales

== 1978–79 ==
=== Supertests ===
For the 1978–79 season the Supertest format was changed to a round-robin format, with the top team going to the final, and the other two teams playing-off in a semi-final. The Supertests were also changed from the traditional five-day Test match format to four-day day–night matches.

8–11 December 1978
scorecard

Australia	v	World XI
150 (83.5 overs); Ian Chappell 48; Garth Le Roux 5/39 (25.5 overs)		175 (99.4 overs); Javed Miandad 59; Dennis Lillee 4/51 (32.4 overs)
180 (98.2 overs); Greg Chappell 81; Imran Khan 4/30 (15.2)		257 (140 overs); Majid Khan 77; Gary Gilmour 3/57 (29 overs)

World XI won by 102 runs
VFL Park, Melbourne, Victoria
Umpires: Gary Duperouzel and Jack Collins

21–23 December 1978
scorecard

West Indies	v	World XI
217 (70.5 overs); Lawrence Rowe 85; Mike Procter 3/36 (8.5 overs)		471 (163.3 overs); Asif Iqbal 107; Albert Padmore 4/102 (39.3 overs)
210 (62.2 overs); Andy Roberts 45; Derek Underwood 3/68 (24 overs)

World XI won by an innings and 4 runs
Sydney Cricket Ground, New South Wales
Umpires: Gary Duperouzel and Peter Enright

12–15 January 1979
scorecard

Australia	v	West Indies
366 (121.5 overs); Kepler Wessels 126; Joel Garner 3/79 (32 overs)		419 (163.1 overs); Lawrence Rowe 175; Dennis Lillee 3/91 (42 overs)
304 (152 overs); Ian Chappell 65; Ryan Austin 4/85 (53 overs)		2/126 (57 overs); Gordon Greenidge 58*; Mick Malone 2/41 (13 overs)

Match drawn
VFL Park, Melbourne, Victoria
Umpires: Gary Duperouzel and Douglas Sang Hue
Player of the match: Lawrence Rowe

By winning both matches the World XI qualified for the final. A semi-final between WSC Australia and WSC West Indies determined the other finalist.

Semi-Final

21–24 January 1979
scorecard

Australia	v	West Indies
185 (86.4 overs); David Hookes 69; Colin Croft 5/65 (26 overs)		163 (67 overs); Gordon Greenidge 39; Ray Bright 6/52 (23 overs)
0/68 (24.5 overs); Kepler Wessels 40*		89 (37.5 overs); Clive Lloyd 29; Dennis Lillee 7/23 (14 overs)

Australia won by 10 wickets
Sydney Cricket Ground, New South Wales
Umpires: Gary Duperouzel and Jack Collins

Final

2–4 February 1979
scorecard

Australia	v	World XI
172 (50.4 overs); David Hookes 33; Garth Le Roux 5/57 (18.4 overs)		168 (64.5 overs); Garth Le Roux 33*; Dennis Lillee 5/51 (18.5 overs)
219 (87.3 overs); David Hookes 96; Garth Le Roux 4/44 (17.3 overs)		5/226 (57.1 overs); Barry Richards 101*; Gary Gilmour 2/75 (22 overs)

World XI won by 5 wickets
Sydney Cricket Ground, New South Wales
Umpires: Douglas Sang Hue & Jack Collins
Player of the match: Garth Le Roux

=== International Cup ===
For the 1978–79 season the limited overs International Cup saw both sides allocated fifty overs of six balls each. Two points were assigned for a win, one for a no result. If teams were level on points, combined run-rate would be used to separate them. The top two teams would contest a best-of-four final series.

Team	Pts	Pld	W	L	A	RR
Australia	15	12	7	4	1	3.65
West Indies	11	12	5	6	1	3.51
World XI	10	12	4	6	2	3.44

A crowd of 44,377 attended the first match of the 1978–79 International Cup, under the new floodlights at the SCG.

28 November 1978 (D/N)
Scorecard

West Indies; 128 (47.3 overs)	v	Australia; 5/129 (37 overs)
Gordon Greenidge 41; Greg Chappell 5/19 (9.3 overs)		Ian Davis 48; Joel Garner 2/18 (8 overs)

Australia won by 5 wickets
Sydney Cricket Ground, New South Wales
Umpires: Jack Collins and Douglas Sang Hue

29 November 1978 (D/N)
Scorecard

Australia; 6/223 (50 overs)	v	World XI; 4/99 (30.3 overs)
Ian Chappell 66; Derek Underwood 3/40 (10 overs)		Zaheer Abbas 32; Mick Malone 2/11 (7 overs)

Australia won on higher run-rate
Sydney Cricket Ground, New South Wales

4 December 1978 (D/N)
Scorecard

World XI; 163 (48.1 overs)	v	Australia; 100 (43.2 overs)
Javed Miandad 62; Dennis Lillee 4/30 (9.1 overs)		Ian Davis 29; Garth Le Roux 3/13 (8 overs)

World XI won by 63 runs
Sydney Cricket Ground, New South Wales

13 December 1978 (D/N)
Scorecard

Australia; 217 (50 overs)	v	World XI; 179 (45.5 overs)
Greg Chappell 79; Imran Khan 4/40 (10 overs)		Clive Rice 44; Greg Chappell 3/26 (10 overs)

Australia won by 38 runs
Sydney Cricket Ground, New South Wales
Player of the match: Greg Chappell

14 December 1978 (D/N)
Scorecard

World XI; 9/112 (38 overs)	v	West Indies; 2/116 (23.4 overs)
Clive Rice 44; Michael Holding 3/16 (10 overs)		Gordon Greenidge 58*; Imran Khan 1/16 (5 overs)

West Indies won by 8 wickets
Sydney Cricket Ground, New South Wales
Player of the match: Gordon Greenidge

16 December 1978 (D/N)
Scorecard

World XI; 8/194 (50 overs)	v	West Indies
Asif Iqbal 54; Andy Roberts 2/33 (10 overs)

No result
VFL Park, Melbourne, Victoria

18 December 1978 (D/N)
Scorecard

Australia; 6/239 (50 overs)	v	World XI; 167 (42.3 overs)
Greg Chappell 62; Derek Underwood 2/33 (10 overs)		Mike Procter 41; Len Pascoe 5/30 (10 overs)

Australia won by 72 runs
VFL Park, Melbourne, Victoria
Player of the match: Len Pascoe

19 December 1978 (D/N)
Scorecard

Australia; 6/216 (50 overs)	v	West Indies; 5/217 (48.1 overs)
Bruce Laird 68; Joel Garner 1/17 (10 overs)		Desmond Haynes 97; Max Walker 2/32 (10 overs)

West Indies won by 5 wickets
VFL Park, Melbourne, Victoria
Player of the match: Desmond Haynes

27 December 1978 (D/N)
Scorecard

West Indies; 66 (33.4 overs)	v	Australia; 4/69 (18.3 overs)
Lawrence Rowe 25; Greg Chappell 4/15 (9 overs)		David Hookes 35*; Wayne Daniel 2/26 (5 overs)

Australia won by 6 wickets
Sydney Cricket Ground, New South Wales
Player of the match: Greg Chappell

28 December 1978 (D/N)
Scorecard

World XI	v	Australia

Match abandoned without a ball bowled
Sydney Cricket Ground, New South Wales

30 December 1978
Scorecard

World XI; 197 (49.3 overs)	v	West Indies; 107 (34.1 overs)
Barry Richards 92; Andy Roberts 3/35 (10 overs)		Collis King 25; Garth Le Roux 4/27 (10 overs)

World XI won by 90 runs
The Gabba, Brisbane, Queensland
Umpires: Peter Enright and Col Hoy
Player of the match: Barry Richards

31 December 1978
Scorecard

Australia; 165 (48.3 overs)	v	West Indies; 126 (37.3 overs)
Ian Chappell 52; Collis King 3/42 (9 overs)		Clive Lloyd 64; Dennis Lillee 3/15 (8 overs)

Australia won by 39 runs
The Gabba, Brisbane, Queensland
Umpires: Peter Enright and Col Hoy
Player of the match: Clive Lloyd

1 January 1979
Scorecard

Australia; 54 (28.1 overs)	v	World XI; 2/55 (12.3)
Rod Marsh 15; Garth Le Roux 5/6 (6.1 overs)		Javed Miandad 25*; Max Walker 2/35 (6 overs)

World XI won by 8 wickets
The Gabba, Brisbane, Queensland
Umpires: Peter Enright and Col Hoy
Player of the match: Garth Le Roux

2 January 1979
Scorecard

World XI; 142 (47.4 overs)	v	West Indies; 3/146 (28.2 overs)
Majid Khan 38; Wayne Daniel 4/29 (10 overs)		Viv Richards 83; Clive Rice 1/10 (5 overs)

West Indies won by 7 wickets
Oxley Oval, Port Macquarie, New South Wales
Player of the match: Wayne Daniel

3 January 1979 (D/N)
Scorecard

World XI; 9/157 (50 overs)	v	West Indies; 3/160 (36.4 overs)
Tony Greig 62; Wayne Daniel 4/33 (10 overs)		Gordon Greenidge 82*; Garth Le Roux 2/37 (8 overs)

West Indies won by 7 wickets
Sydney Cricket Ground, New South Wales
Player of the match: Gordon Greenidge

8 January 1979 (D/N)
Scorecard

World XI; 102 (41.4 overs)	v	West Indies; 67 (29.4 overs)
Tony Greig 19; Joel Garner 2/15 (7 overs)		Collis King 20; Imran Khan 3/12 (7 overs)

World XI won by 35 runs
VFL Park, Melbourne, Victoria
Umpires: Col Hoy and Douglas Sang Hue
Player of the match: Imran Khan

9 January 1979 (D/N)
Scorecard

Australia; 174 (49.3 overs)	v	West Indies; 103 (39.5 overs)
Kepler Wessels 54; Wayne Daniel 3/26 (9.3 overs)		Clive Lloyd 29; Max Walker 5/23 (10 overs)

Australia won by 71 runs
VFL Park, Melbourne, Victoria
Umpires: Col Hoy and Douglas Sang Hue
Player of the match: Max Walker

17 January 1979 (D/N)
Scorecard

Australia; 9/149 (50 overs)	v	West Indies; 4/65 (12 overs)
Ian Davis 32; Richard Austin 3/30 (10 overs)		Richard Austin 22*; Len Pascoe 3/38 (6 overs)

West Indies won on higher run-rate
Sydney Cricket Ground, New South Wales
Player of the match: Richard Austin

Finals

27 January 1979 (D/N)
Scorecard

Australia; 5/208 (50 overs)	v	West Indies; 9/169 (50 overs)
Kepler Wessels 136; Michael Holding 1/35 (10 overs)		Gordon Greenidge 55; Max Walker 3/33 (10 overs)

Australia won by 39 runs
VFL Park, Melbourne, Victoria
Player of the match: Kepler Wessels

28 January 1979 (D/N)
Scorecard

Australia; 8/189 (50 overs)	v	West Indies; 6/192 (28.5 overs)
Kepler Wessels 40; Wayne Daniel 2/51 (10 overs)		Viv Richards 44; Dennis Lillee 2/36 (9.5 overs)

West Indies won by 4 wickets
VFL Park, Melbourne, Victoria
Umpires: Gary Duperouzel and Col Hoy
Player of the match: Collis King

29 January 1979 (D/N)
Scorecard

Australia; 6/200 (49 overs)	v	West Indies; 3/202 (46 overs)
Kepler Wessels 70; Wayne Daniel 2/42 (10 overs)		Gordon Greenidge 81; Max Walker 2/48 (10 overs)

West Indies won by 7 wickets
VFL Park, Melbourne, Victoria
Player of the match: Gordon Greenidge

30 January 1979 (D/N)
Scorecard

Australia; 240 (50 overs)	v	West Indies; 8/228 (46 overs)
Martin Kent 62; Wayne Daniel 2/50 (10 overs)		Clive Lloyd 72*; Gary Gilmour 3/46 (10 overs)

West Indies won on higher run-rate
VFL Park, Melbourne, Victoria
Umpires: Gary Duperouzel and Col Hoy
Player of the match: Clive Lloyd

West Indies won the finals 3–1.

== 1979 tour to the West Indies ==
In 1979, following the tour of New Zealand, the WSC Australians team set off for a more extensive tour to the Caribbean that would encompass five Supertest games and twelve one-day games against the WSC West Indies.

=== Supertests ===
For this series the Supertests reverted to a traditional five-day format.

23–26 February 1979
Scorecard

West Indies	v	Australia
188 (56.2 overs); Clive Lloyd 56; Dennis Lillee 4/68 (18.2 overs)		106 (37 overs); David Hookes 23; Wayne Daniel 3/24 (7 overs)
481 (109.4 overs); Clive Lloyd 197; Dennis Lillee 4/100 (25 overs)		194 (51.4 overs); Ray Bright 47; Michael Holding 3/37 (10 overs)

West Indies won by 369 runs
Sabina Park, Jamaica
Umpires: Douglas Sang Hue
Player of the match: Clive Lloyd

9–13 March 1979
Scorecard

West Indies	v	Australia
239 (58 overs); Roy Fredericks 89; Dennis Lillee 3/56 (13 overs)		311 (106.1 overs); Martin Kent 78; Michael Holding 4/67 (26.1 overs)
133/4 (29 overs); Roy Fredericks 53; Len Pascoe 3/20 (4 overs)		294 (102.5 overs); Greg Chappell 90; Richard Austin 3/59 (24.5 overs)

Match drawn
Kensington Oval, Barbados
Umpires: Douglas Sang Hue
Player of the match: Ian Chappell

16–20 March 1979
Scorecard

West Indies	v	Australia
230 (69.4 overs); Andy Roberts 50*; Jeff Thomson 5/78 (20 overs)		246 (100 overs); Bruce Laird 122; Michael Holding 5/48 (21 overs)
274 (89.5 overs); Roy Fredericks 72; Ian Chappell 3/35 (10 overs)		282 (144.4 overs); Greg Chappell 150; Albert Padmore 6/81 (54.4 overs)

Australia won by 24 runs
Queen's Park Oval, Trinidad and Tobago
Umpires: Douglas Sang Hue
Player of the match: Greg Chappell

25–28 March 1979
Scorecard

West Indies	v	Australia
476 (113.1 overs); Collis King 110; Jeff Thomson 4/84 (25 overs)		341 (112.1 overs); Greg Chappell 113; Joel Garner 3/60 (26 overs)
		3/117 (33 overs); Trevor Chappell 28; Colin Croft 2/32 (8 overs)

Match drawn
Bourda, Guyana
Umpires: Douglas Sang Hue
Player of the match: Collis King

- No play on first day due to rain and riot

6–10 April 1979
Scorecard

West Indies	v	Australia
438 (124.2 overs); Lawrence Rowe 135; Dennis Lillee 6/125 (33.2 overs)		234 (69.2 overs); Greg Chappell 104; Colin Croft 4/56 (18.2 overs)
		6/415 (128 overs); Rod Marsh 102*; Michael Holding 2/74 (25 overs)

Match drawn
Antigua Recreation Ground, Antigua
Umpires: Douglas Sang Hue
Player of the match: Greg Chappell

Drawn series 1–1.
