= WSC West Indies cricket team in Australia in 1977–78 =

In World Series Cricket

West Indies in Australia
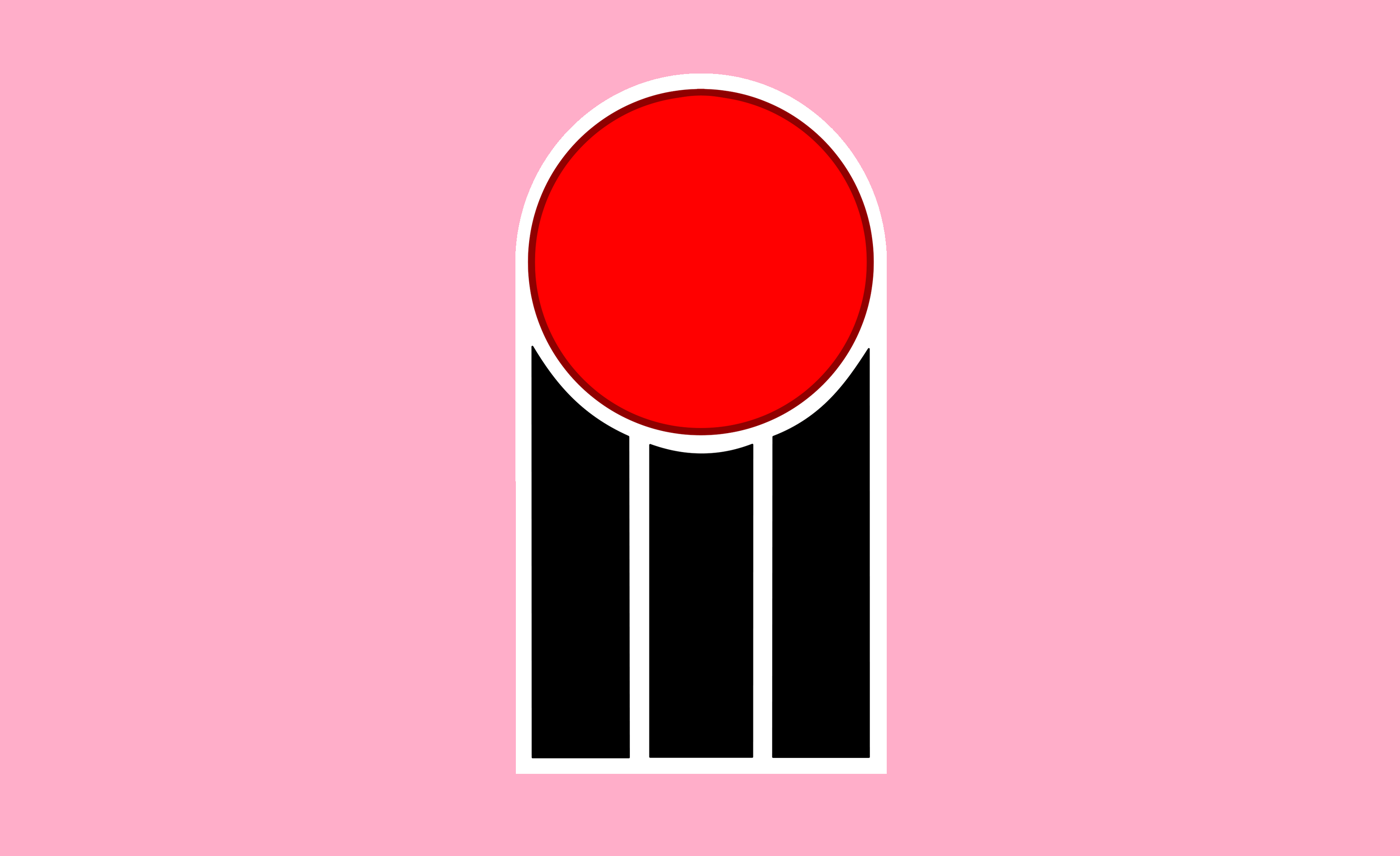
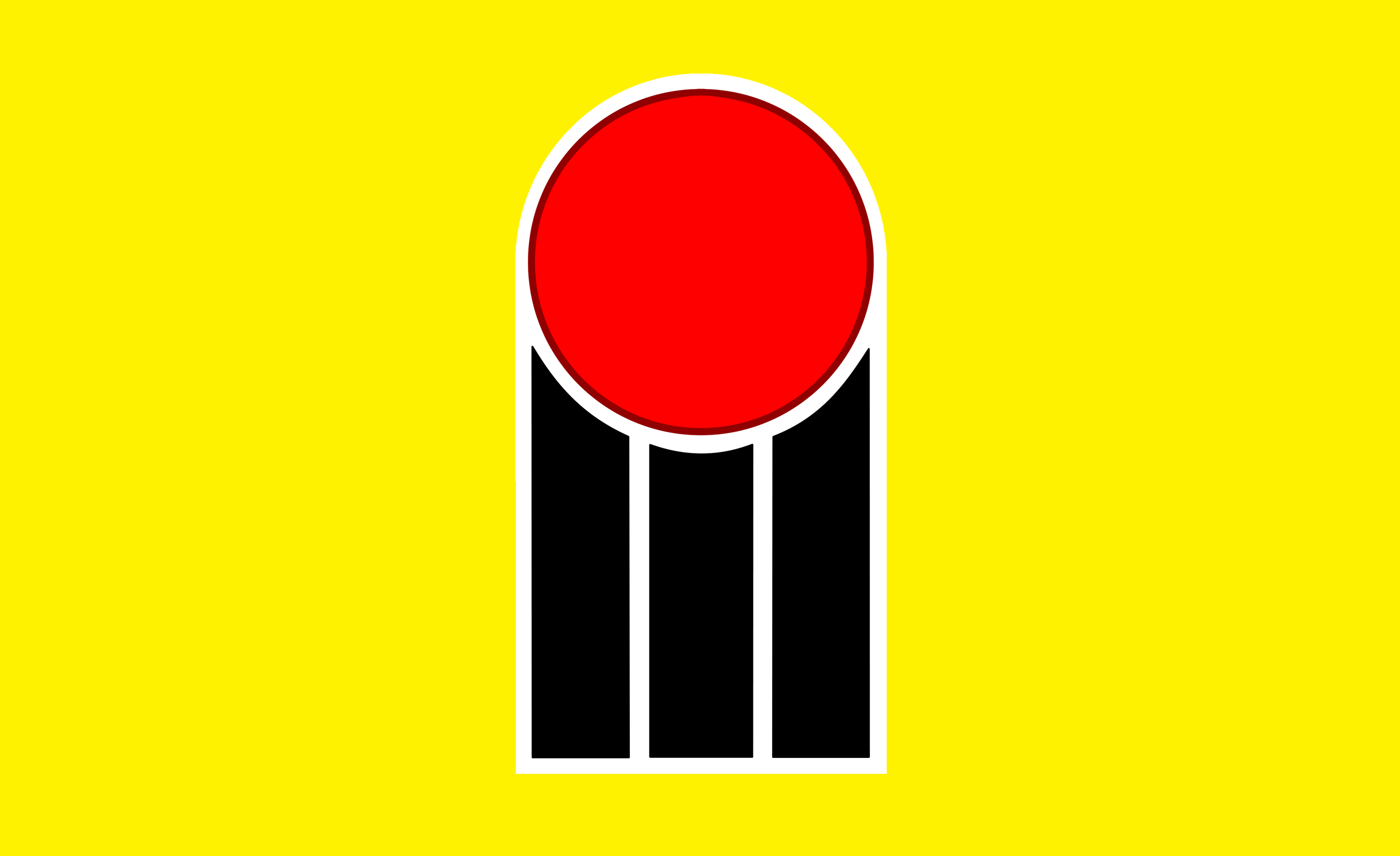
| | West Indies | Australia |
- Dates: 2 December 1977 – 3 January 1978
| Captains | Clive Lloyd | Ian Chappell |

Test series
- Result: West Indies won the 3-match series 2–1
| Most runs | Viv Richards (360) | Ian Chappell (251) |
| Most wickets | Andy Roberts (15) | Max Walker (10); Dennis Lillie (10) |

In late 1977, the new World Series Cricket competition began in Australia between three teams playing both multi-day and one day games. The first set of these fixtures to be played was a three match series between the Australian team and the West Indies team, starting at the beginning of December.

== Background ==
Since 1976, Kerry Packer, the owner of the Nine Network, had sought the rights to broadcast live coverage of Australia's home test matches, and had found himself rebuffed by the Australian Cricket Board in favour of continued live coverage on the Australian Broadcasting Company, which was the country's state broadcaster. Following Nine's winning of the rights to broadcast the 1977 Ashes tour to England, in which Packer was presented with the idea of staging some televised exhibition matches, he fleshed it out into the idea of a full blown series of games between the best Australian players, and the best players from the rest of the world. In 1977, Packer began signing contracts with Australian players recommended by former Australia captain Ian Chappell, while he was also able to negotiate a deal with then England captain Tony Greig for him to act as Packer's agent in signing non-Australian players. Among these non-Australians were a significant number of players from the West Indies, who found the contracts they were being offered would pay them potentially more than they could earn in their entire careers. As a consequence, although only intended to feature Australia against the Rest of the World, the organisers were able to form a third team, made up wholly of West Indian players.

The first match was scheduled as a five-day game between the Australian XI and the West Indies XI from 2 December 1977; Packer was unable to use the term "Test Match", so the fixture was the first of what came to be known as "Supertests". This game, held at VFL Park in Melbourne, began on the same day as the first day of the official Australian team's Test Match against India in Brisbane.

== Supertests ==
Because the MCC holds the copyright to the Laws of Cricket, Packer was therefore prevented from using them, he recruited former Australia captain Richie Benaud to formulate the rules and conditions for the new competition, which led to each over consisting of 8 balls.

=== First Supertest ===
2–4 December 1977
scorecard

| Australia | v | West Indies |
| 256 (56.2 overs); Ray Bright 69; Michael Holding 4/60 (12 overs) | | 214 (49 overs); Viv Richards 79; Len Pascoe 3/70 (14 overs) |
| 192 (36.6 overs); David Hookes 63; Andy Roberts 4/52 (13 overs) | | 7/237 (50.7 overs); Viv Richards 56; Max Walker 3/43 (13 overs) |

West Indies won by 3 wickets
VFL Park, Melbourne, Victoria
Umpires: Jack Collins and Douglas Sang Hue

- West Indies won the toss and elected to field

=== Second Supertest ===
16–18 December 1977
scorecard

| Australia | v | West Indies |
| 251 (56 overs); David Hookes 81; Andy Roberts 3/48 (15 overs) | | 336 (65.2 overs); Viv Richards 88; Max Walker 3/71 (13 overs) |
| 182 (44.2 overs); Rick McCosker 56; Joel Garner 4/58 (13 overs) | | 1/101 (16.5 overs); Roy Fredericks 49; Len Pascoe 1/31 (5.7 overs) |

West Indies won by 9 wickets
RAS Showground, Sydney, New South Wales
Umpires: Gary Duperouzel and Peter Enright

- West Indies won the toss and elected to field

=== Third Supertest ===
31 December 1977 – 3 January 1978
scorecard

| Australia | v | West Indies |
| 388 (105.2 overs); Ian Chappell 141; Andy Roberts 3/67 (20.2 overs) | | 145 (39.7 overs); Gordon Greenidge 40; Greg Chappell 5/20 (12 overs) |
| 8/267 dec (75 overs); Bruce Laird 106; Collis King 4/78 (19 overs) | | 290 (62.3 overs); Viv Richards 123; Ray Bright 4/74 (20 overs) |

Australia won by 220 runs
Football Park, Adelaide, South Australia
Umpires: Gary Duperouzel and Douglas Sang Hue

- Australia won the toss and elected to bat
