= 1978–79 World Series Cricket Supertests =

In World Series Cricket

In the 1978–79 season, the new World Series Cricket (WSC) held a supertest competition in Australia between three teams; Australia, the West Indies and the World XI. It introduced finals to the competition for the first time.

== Results ==
First match

8-11 December 1978
scorecard

World XI	v	Australia
175 (99.4 overs); Javed Miandad 59; Dennis Lillee 4/51 (32.4 overs)		150 (83.5 overs); Ian Chappell 48; Garth Le Roux 5/39 (25.5 overs)
257 (140 overs); Mike Procter 66; Gary Gilmour 3/57 (29 overs)		180 (98.2 overs); Greg Chappell 81; Imran Khan 4/30 (15.2 overs)

World XI won by 102 runs
VFL Park, Melbourne
Umpires: Gary Duperouzel and Jack Collins

- no toss
- 4-day match

Second match

21-23 December 1978
scorecard

World XI	v	West Indies
471 (163.3 overs); Asif Iqbal 107; Albert Padmore 4/102 (39.3 overs)		217 (70.5 overs); Lawrence Rowe 85; Mike Procter 3/36 (8.5 overs)
		210 (62.2 overs); Andy Roberts 45; Derek Underwood 3/68 (24 overs)

World XI won by an innings and 44 runs
Sydney Cricket Ground, Sydney
Umpires: Gary Duperouzel and Peter Enright
Player of the match: Clive Rice (WXI)

- World XI elected to bat first
- 4-day match

Third match

12-15 January 1979
scorecard

Australia	v	West Indies
366 (121.5 overs); Kepler Wessels 126; Joel Garner 3/79 (32 overs)		419 (163.1 overs); Lawrence Rowe 175; Dennis Lillee 3/91 (42 overs)
304/9d (152 overs); Ian Chappell 65; Richard Austin 4/85 (53 overs)		126/2 (57 overs); Gordon Greenidge 58*; Mick Malone 2/41 (13 overs)

Match drawn
VFL Park, Melbourne
Umpires: Douglas Sang Hue and Gary Duperouzel
Player of the match: Lawrence Rowe (WIN)

- Australia elected to bat first
- 4-day match

Semi-final

21-24 January 1979
scorecard

West Indies	v	Australia
163 (67 overs); Gordon Greenidge 39; Ray Bright 6/52 (23 overs)		185 (86.4 overs); David Hookes 69; Colin Croft 5/65 (26 overs)
89 (37.5 overs); Clive Lloyd 29; Dennis Lillee 7/23 (14 overs)		68/0 (24.5 overs); Kepler Wessels 40*

Australia won by 10 wickets
Sydney Cricket Ground, Sydney
Umpires: Gary Duperouzel and Jack Collins

- West Indies elected to bat first
- 4-day match

Final

2-4 February 1979
scorecard

Australia	v	World XI
172 (50.4 overs); David Hookes 33; Garth Le Roux 5/57 (18.4 overs)		168 (64.5 overs); Garth Le Roux 33*; Dennis Lillee 5/51 (18.5 overs)
219 (87.3 overs); David Hookes 96; Garth Le Roux 4/44 (17.3 overs)		226/5 (57.1 overs); Barry Richards 101*; Gary Gilmour 2/75 (22 overs)

World XI won by 5 wickets
Sydney Cricket Ground, Sydney
Umpires: Douglas Sang Hue and Jack Collins
Player of the match: Garth Le Roux (WXI)

- Australia elected to bat first
- 4-day match
