= List of World Series Cricket international centuries =

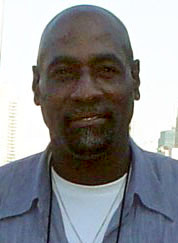
Viv Richards scored 4 centuries in World Series Cricket, second only to Greg Chappell.

World Series Cricket (WSC) was a professional cricket competition established by Kerry Packer which ran from 1977 and 1979. Packer set the competition up after failing to gain the rights to show Test cricket on his Channel Nine television channel. It was opposed by the International Cricket Conference (ICC), (Note: The International Cricket Conference was renamed the International Cricket Council in 1989.) who ruled that such matches would not be first-class, and any players taking part would be banned from playing in officially sanctioned cricket, although the latter was ruled to be a "restraint of trade" and was not enforceable. They also barred the WSC from using the term "Test matches", or naming a team "Australia". As a result, the matches were dubbed "Supertests", while the teams were WSC Australia XI, WSC West Indies XI and WSC World XI. In all, 16 Supertests and 58 international one-day matches were played, before Packer and the Australian Cricket Board came to an agreement in May 1979, and World Series Cricket came to an end.

The first Supertest began on 2 December 1977, although the first century (100 or more runs in a single innings) was not scored until the third match, in which Ian Chappell accumulated 141 runs in the first innings. Bruce Laird and Viv Richards went on to score centuries in the same match. A month later, Barry Richards achieved the competition's first double century, scoring 207 runs for the WSC World XI. In the same innings, Gordon Greenidge and Richards also passed a hundred, while Greg Chappell did so in the second innings for WSC Australia XI. In the next match, Greg Chappell surpassed Richards' total, remaining 246 not out, one of his record five WSC centuries.

Only two centuries were made in the international one-day matches. Kepler Wessels scored the first, accruing 136 runs; his score is the highest in WSC one-day international matches, and makes him the only player to have scored a century in both a Supertest and an international one-day match in the WSC. The other century was scored by Martin Kent, who scored 109 runs. In all, 25 centuries were scored in Supertests, and 2 in international one-day matches. Seven of the centuries were scored at VFL Park in Melbourne, the most of any venue.

== Key ==
| Symbol | Meaning |
|---|---|
| * | The century scorer remained not out. |
| Inn. | The innings of the match in which the player scored his century. |
| Date | The date on which the match began. |
| Lost | The match was lost by the century scorer's team. |
| Won | The match was won by the century scorer's team. |
| Drawn | The match was drawn. |

== Century scores ==
Centuries in Supertests
| No. | Player | Score | For | Against | Inn. | Venue | Date | Result | Ref(s) |
|---|---|---|---|---|---|---|---|---|---|
| 1 | Ian Chappell | 141 | Australia | West Indies | 1 | Football Park, Adelaide | 31 December 1977 | Won | |
| 2 | Bruce Laird | 106 | Australia | West Indies | 3 | Football Park, Adelaide | 31 December 1977 | Won | |
| 3 | Viv Richards | 123 | West Indies | Australia | 4 | Football Park, Adelaide | 31 December 1977 | Lost | |
| 4 | Bruce Laird | 106 | Australia | World XI | 1 | RAS Showground, Sydney | 14 January 1978 | Lost | |
| 5 | Viv Richards | 119 | World XI | Australia | 2 | RAS Showground, Sydney | 14 January 1978 | Won | |
| 6 | Barry Richards | 207 | World XI | Australia | 1 | Gloucester Park, Perth | 27 January 1978 | Won | |
| 7 | Gordon Greenidge | 140 | World XI | Australia | 1 | Gloucester Park, Perth | 27 January 1978 | Won | |
| 8 | Viv Richards | 177 | World XI | Australia | 1 | Gloucester Park, Perth | 27 January 1978 | Won | |
| 9 | Greg Chappell | 174 | Australia | World XI | 2 | Gloucester Park, Perth | 27 January 1978 | Lost | |
| 10 | Rick McCosker | 129 | Australia | World XI | 1 | VFL Park, Melbourne | 9 February 1978 | Won | |
| 11 | Greg Chappell | 246* | Australia | World XI | 1 | VFL Park, Melbourne | 9 February 1978 | Won | |
| 12 | Viv Richards | 170 | World XI | Australia | 2 | VFL Park, Melbourne | 9 February 1978 | Lost | |
| 13 | Asif Iqbal | 107 | World XI | West Indies | 1 | Sydney Cricket Ground, Sydney | 21 December 1978 | Won | |
| 14 | Kepler Wessels | 126 | Australia | West Indies | 1 | VFL Park, Melbourne | 12 January 1979 | Drawn | |
| 15 | David Hookes | 116 | Australia | West Indies | 1 | VFL Park, Melbourne | 12 January 1979 | Drawn | |
| 16 | Lawrence Rowe | 175 | West Indies | Australia | 2 | VFL Park, Melbourne | 12 January 1979 | Drawn | |
| 17 | Barry Richards | 101* | World XI | Australia | 4 | Sydney Cricket Ground, Sydney | 2 February 1979 | Won | |
| 18 | Clive Lloyd | 197 | West Indies | Australia | 3 | Sabina Park, Kingston | 23 February 1979 | Won | |
| 19 | Bruce Laird | 122 | Australia | West Indies | 1 | Queen's Park Oval, Port of Spain | 16 March 1979 | Won | |
| 20 | Greg Chappell | 150 | Australia | West Indies | 3 | Queen's Park Oval, Port of Spain | 16 March 1979 | Won | |
| 21 | Greg Chappell | 113 | Australia | West Indies | 1 | Bourda, Georgetown | 25 March 1979 | Drawn | |
| 22 | Collis King | 110 | West Indies | Australia | 2 | Bourda, Georgetown | 25 March 1979 | Drawn | |
| 23 | Greg Chappell | 104 | Australia | West Indies | 1 | Antigua Recreation Ground, St John's | 6 April 1979 | Drawn | |
| 24 | Lawrence Rowe | 135 | West Indies | Australia | 2 | Antigua Recreation Ground, St John's | 6 April 1979 | Drawn | |
| 25 | Rod Marsh | 102* | Australia | West Indies | 3 | Antigua Recreation Ground, St John's | 6 April 1979 | Drawn | |

Centuries in international one-day matches
| No. | Player | Score | For | Against | Inn. | Venue | Date | Result | Ref(s) |
|---|---|---|---|---|---|---|---|---|---|
| 1 | Kepler Wessels | 136 | Australia | West Indies | 1 | VFL Park, Melbourne | 27 January 1979 | Won | |
| 2 | Martin Kent | 109 | Australia | West Indies | 2 | Kensington Oval, Bridgetown | 7 March 1979 | Lost | |

== See also ==
- List of World Series Cricket international five-wicket hauls

== Notes and references ==
Notes
