= List of international cricket centuries by Greg Chappell =

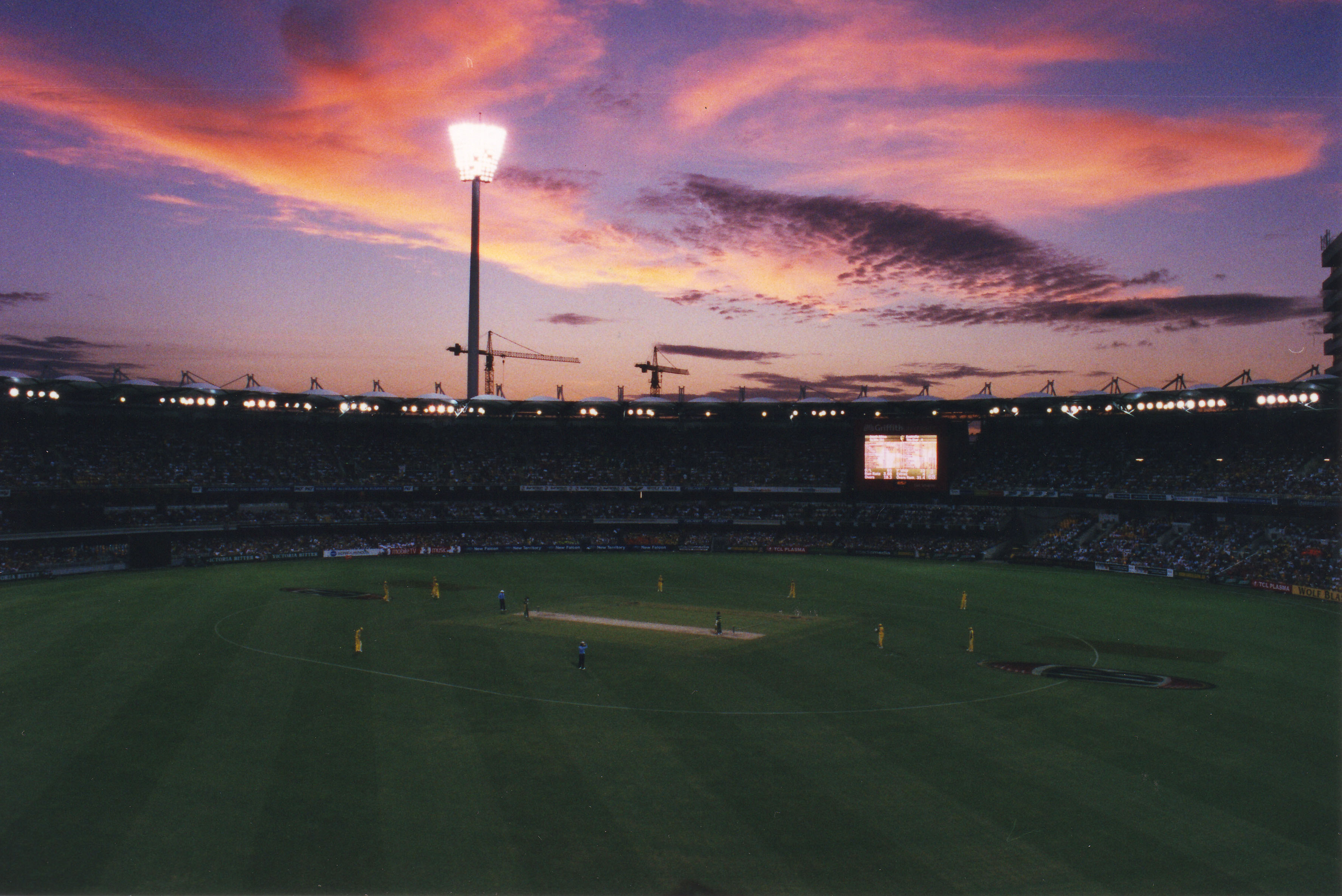
Greg Chappell scored five of his twenty-four Test cricket centuries at Brisbane Cricket Ground.

Greg Chappell is a former international cricketer who represented Australia in 161 matches between 1970 and 1984. He was described by the cricket journalist Gideon Haigh as "the outstanding Australian batsman of his generation", while fellow journalist Christopher Martin-Jenkins said he was capable of "[mastering] even the best bowlers in the worst batting conditions." A right-handed top-order batsman, he scored 27 centuries (100 or more runs in a single innings) in international cricket – 24 in Test cricket and 3 in One Day Internationals (ODIs). He ranks 9th amongst Australian batsmen in terms of international centuries, and joint 41st overall, though he played fewer matches than all but Don Bradman above him.

Chappell played his first Test match in December 1970, and became the tenth Australian to score a century on Test debut, accumulating 108 runs against England in the second Test of the 1970–71 Ashes series. In 1974, he scored centuries in both innings of a match against New Zealand; his brother, Ian also achieved the feat in the match. In the first innings against New Zealand, Chappell recorded his highest score in Test cricket, 247 not out. He scored two centuries in a Test again late the following year against the West Indies, during his first match as captain of Australia. He scored three further double centuries in Test matches, two against Pakistan, and one against India, all in 1980 or 1981. During the fifth Test of the 1983–84 series against Pakistan, Chappell announced that he would retire at the end of the match; during the fourth day he scored his final century in international cricket. In doing so, Chappell became one of only four players to score centuries in both their first and last Test match. (Note: The other three players to have scored centuries in their first and last Tests are Reggie Duff, Bill Ponsford and Mohammad Azharuddin.)

In ODI cricket, Chappell made his debut in January 1971, but did not score his first century in the format until 1977, when his 125 not out helped Australia to chase down victory against England. His highest score in ODIs came in 1980, when he scored 138 not out against New Zealand, and he scored his third and final ODI century against the same opponents in 1982. Though he only scored three ODI centuries, he was the first player to score more than 2,000 runs in the format, and at the time of his retirement, he was the leading run-scorer in ODIs. (Note: Chappell's total of 2331 runs in ODI cricket has since been surpassed by more than 200 other players.)

== Key ==
Symbol	Meaning
*	Remained not out
Pos.	Position in the batting order
Inn.	The innings of the match in which he scored his century.
Test	The number of the Test match played in that series (for example, "1/3" denotes the first Test in a three match series).
H/A	Whether the venue is home (Australia) or away (opponent's home).
Date	The date on which the match began (tests) or was played (ODI).
S/R	Strike rate during the innings

Symbol	Meaning
Lost	The match was lost by Australia.
Won	The match was won by Australia.
Drawn	The match was drawn.
†	One of two centuries scored by Chappell in the match.
C	He was the captain of the Australia team in that match.
M	He was named man of the match.

== Test centuries ==
Test centuries scored by Greg Chappell
No.	Score	Against	Pos.	Inn.	Test	Venue	H/A	Date	Result	Notes	Ref
1	108	England	7	2	2/7	WACA Ground, Perth	Home	11 December 1970	Drawn		
2	131	England	4	2	2/5	Lord's Cricket Ground, London	Away	22 June 1972	Won		
3	113	England	4	2	5/5	Kennington Oval, London	Away	10 August 1972	Won		
4	116*	Pakistan	4	1	2/3	Melbourne Cricket Ground, Melbourne	Home	29 December 1972	Won		
5	106	West Indies	4	1	2/5	Kensington Oval, Bridgetown	Away	9 March 1973	Drawn		
6	247*	New Zealand	4	1	1/3	Basin Reserve, Wellington	Away	1 March 1974	Drawn	†	
7	133	New Zealand	4	3	1/3	Basin Reserve, Wellington	Away	1 March 1974	Drawn	†	
8	144	England	3	3	4/6	Sydney Cricket Ground, Sydney	Home	4 January 1975	Won		
9	102	England	4	3	6/6	Melbourne Cricket Ground, Melbourne	Home	8 February 1975	Lost		
10	123	West Indies	4	2	1/6	Brisbane Cricket Ground, Brisbane	Home	28 November 1975	Won	C, M, †	
11	109*	West Indies	4	4	1/6	Brisbane Cricket Ground, Brisbane	Home	28 November 1975	Won	C, M, †	
12	182*	West Indies	5	2	4/6	Sydney Cricket Ground, Sydney	Home	3 January 1976	Won	C, M	
13	121	Pakistan	4	1	2/3	Melbourne Cricket Ground, Melbourne	Home	1 January 1977	Won	C	
14	112	England	3	3	2/3	Old Trafford Cricket Ground, Manchester	Away	7 July 1977	Lost	C	
15	124	West Indies	4	3	1/3	Brisbane Cricket Ground, Brisbane	Home	1 December 1979	Drawn	C	
16	114	England	6	2	3/3	Melbourne Cricket Ground, Melbourne	Home	1 February 1980	Won	C	
17	235	Pakistan	4	1	2/3	Iqbal Stadium, Faisalabad	Away	6 March 1980	Drawn	C	
18	204	India	3	2	1/3	Sydney Cricket Ground, Sydney	Home	2 January 1981	Won	C, M	
19	201	Pakistan	3	2	2/3	Brisbane Cricket Ground, Brisbane	Home	27 November 1981	Won	C, M	
20	176	New Zealand	4	1	3/3	Lancaster Park, Christchurch	Away	19 March 1982	Won	C, M	
21	117	England	4	2	1/5	WACA Ground, Perth	Home	12 November 1982	Drawn	C	
22	115	England	3	1	3/5	Adelaide Oval, Adelaide	Home	10 December 1982	Won	C	
23	150*	Pakistan	6	2	2/5	Brisbane Cricket Ground, Brisbane	Home	25 November 1983	Drawn		
24	182	Pakistan	4	2	5/5	Sydney Cricket Ground, Sydney	Home	2 January 1984	Won	M	

== One Day International centuries ==
ODI centuries scored by Greg Chappell
No.	Score	Against	Pos.	Inn.	S/R	Venue	H/A	Date	Result	Ref	Notes
1	125*	England	3	2	91.24	Kennington Oval, London	Away	6 June 1977	Won		C, M
2	138*	New Zealand	3	1	126.60	Sydney Cricket Ground, Sydney	Home	25 November 1980	Won		C, M
3	108	New Zealand	4	2	117.39	Eden Park, Auckland	Away	13 February 1982	Won		C, M
