= International cricket in 1972 =

International cricket season

The 1972 International cricket season was from May 1972 to August 1972.

== Season overview ==
International tours
Start date	Home team	Away team	Results [Matches]			
Start date	Home team	Away team	Test	ODI	FC	LA
8 June 1972	England	Australia	2–2 [5]	2–1 [3]	—	—

== June ==
=== Australia in England ===
The Ashes Test series
No.	Date	Home captain	Away captain	Venue	Result
Test 698	8–13 June	Ray Illingworth	Ian Chappell	Old Trafford Cricket Ground, Manchester	England by 89 runs
Test 699	22–26 June	Ray Illingworth	Ian Chappell	Lord's, London	Australia by 8 wickets
Test 700	13–18 July	Ray Illingworth	Ian Chappell	Trent Bridge, Nottingham	Match drawn
Test 701	27–29 July	Ray Illingworth	Ian Chappell	Headingley Cricket Ground, Leeds	England by 9 wickets
Test 702	10–16 August	Ray Illingworth	Ian Chappell	Kennington Oval, London	Australia by 5 wickets
ODI series
No.	Date	Home captain	Away captain	Venue	Result
ODI 2	24 August	Brian Close	Ian Chappell	Old Trafford Cricket Ground, Manchester	England by 6 wickets
ODI 3	26 August	Brian Close	Ian Chappell	Lord's, London	Australia by 5 wickets
ODI 4	28 August	Brian Close	Ian Chappell	Edgbaston Cricket Ground, Birmingham	England by 2 wickets
