= Chester Bennett (cricketer) =

Australian cricketer

Personal information
- Full name: Floyd Chester Bennett
- Born: 2 April 1919; Perth, Western Australia
- Died: 26 November 1997 (aged 78); Adelaide, South Australia
- Batting: Right-handed
- Bowling: Right-arm medium
- Role: Batsman

Domestic team information
- Years: Team
- 1945/46: South Australia
- 1950/51–1951/52: Western Australia

Career statistics
Competition	First-class
Matches	8
Runs scored	248
Batting average	17.71
100s/50s	0/1
Top score	56*
Balls bowled	240
Wickets	4
Bowling average	34.25
5 wickets in innings	0
10 wickets in match	0
Best bowling	1/20
Catches/stumpings	5/–
- Source: Cricinfo, 19 October 2017

Floyd Chester Bennett (2 April 1919 – 26 November 1997) was an Australian cricketer. He played eight first-class matches for South Australia and Western Australia between 1945/46 and 1951/52. Playing mainly as a batsman, he scored 248 first-class runs, with 56 not out being his top score.
