= Martin Kent =

Australian cricketer

Personal information
- Full name: Martin Francis Kent
- Born: 23 November 1953 (age 72); Mossman, Queensland, Australia
- Nickname: Super
- Batting: Right-handed

International information
- National side: Australia
- Test debut (cap 312): 30 July 1981 v England
- Last Test: 27 August 1981 v England
- ODI debut (cap 64): 29 January 1981 v New Zealand
- Last ODI: 6 June 1981 v England

Domestic team information
- Years: Team
- 1974/75–1981/82: Queensland

Career statistics
Competition	Test	ODI	FC	LA
Matches	3	5	64	21
Runs scored	171	78	3,567	523
Batting average	28.50	19.50	36.03	27.52
100s/50s	0/2	0/0	7/20	0/4
Top score	54	33 –	171	76
Catches/stumpings	6/–	4/–	60/–	8/–
- Source: CricInfo, 12 December 2005

Martin Francis Kent (born 23 November 1953) is a former Australian cricketer who played in three Test matches and five One Day Internationals in 1981. He also played ten tests and 20 ODIs for the Australian XI during World Series Cricket. Greg Chappell called him "one of the best homegrown talents Queensland has ever had".

== Career ==
He was born in North Queensland, and grew up in Monto from the ages of four to fourteen. He recalled " I was probably a better bowler in my youth than a batsman" and made the State Schoolboys side for Central Queensland.

Kent's family moved to Brisbane when he was fourteen and he was soon playing first grade for Sandgate-Redcliffe. He gave up cricket for a year to play baseball with the Redcliffe Whitesox.

Kent scored 140 on his debut for Queensland in 1974–75 season followed by 76 in a Gillette Cup game. He found the going harder throughout the rest of the season, although he did manage 58 against Western Australia and 59 against South Australia.

The following summer he scored 103 against South Australia and 101 against Victoria.

=== South Africa ===
Kent had frequently batted with Greg Chappell and received an offer to tour South Africa with an invitational XI, the International Wanderers. Kent married just before he left and honeymooned on the tour. "We got time off to go travelling and sightseeing," he recalled. "And in a funny sense, it wasn't a bad honeymoon."

Kent played well with scores of 55, 67 & 52 and 155. He ended up topping the International Wanderers aggregate and averages for the tour – 398 runs at 56.

In October 1976 Jack Fingleton wrote that Kent "will walk into Ian Chappell's vacancy in the national team. He is a glorious strokemaker." However, Kent was unable to break into the Australian side over the 1976–77 season despite 122 against the touring Pakistanis and 82 against South Australia. The Australian selectors preferred Ian Davis, Craig Serjeant, Kim Hughes and David Hookes, all of whom were chosen for the 1977 Ashes tour.

=== World Series Cricket ===
Ian Chappell had admired Kent's batting on the South Africa tour and offered him a contract with World Series Cricket. Kent originally declined as it meant he would have to give up his job with the transport company TNT. However TNT's owner Peter Abeles was a friend of Kerry Packer who was financing World Series Cricket; Abeles insisted that Kent sign with World Series Cricket. He allowed the cricketer to continue working at TNT for part of the year on his full salrary and also play World Series Cricket.

Kent's best innings for the WSC Australians include 40 in a low scoring game, 58 and 110. This earned him selection in the second supertest, against the WSC West Indies, replacing Doug Walters, but he failed twice. Kent kept his spot for the third supertest, with innings of 43 and 40 helping Australia win the game. In the 4th supertest, Kent made 10 and 31; the latter score was Australia's highest in the second innings, a game that Australia lost. In the 5th supertest Kent scored a pair.

The following summer Kent toured with the WSC Cavaliers XI. He had a poor run of form until he scored 114 against the World XI and 55. He eventually got back in the Australian XI for some one-day games, with a top score of 62. Kent was back in the Australian XI test side for the last supertest - the final, against the World XI - but failed twice.

Kent toured the West Indies with the Australian XI. He played in all five supertests, making 9 & 30 in the first, which Australia lost, then hitting 109 in a one-day game for Australia.

For the second supertest Kent made 78 in the first innings. In the third supertest, Kent's second innings of 45 helped take Australia from 2–0 to 3-78 and was crucial in Australian victory. In the next two supertests Kent made 51 & 28, and 40 & 0.

=== Return to traditional cricket ===
At the beginning of the 1979–80 season Ian Chappell said Kent was a possible for the Australian number three position as "he performed with credit in the West Indies at number three" although he "could be considered" for the number six position.

Kent had a patchy 1979–80, not making a first class century, but enjoyed an excellent domestic 1980–81 season, scoring 941 runs at 58.81. Highlights included 77, 171 and 68 against Tasmania and 78 and 101 against South Australia.

His knock of 41 in the McDonald's Cup Final, helping Queensland win the game, won him Man of the Match Award.

Kent was selected in the Australian one-day team towards the end of the summer, making scores of 12, 33 and 4.

=== 1981 Ashes ===
Kent was chosen to tour England in 1981. Greg Chappell elected not to tour and Kim Hughes thought at the beginning that Kent was the most likely candidate to replace him at number three. However he failed during the early games and a score of 91 by Trevor Chappell saw him come into contention for the spot. Eventually Chappell was selected, with Kent relegated to 12th man.

Kent was 12th man in the third test, which England won. He eventually hit form with 92 against Worcestershire (his previous high score had been 27). This earned him selection in the 4th test over Chappell, who was made 12th man.

Kent turned out to be one of Australia's best performing batsmen in the second half of the tour, with a consistent string of scores. He made 171 runs, including a fifty as a makeshift opener at the Oval.

He made 46 and 10 in the 4th test, 52 and 2 in the fifth and 54 and 7 in the 6th.

=== End of career ===
Kent began the 1981–82 season well with 92 for Qld against the touring Pakistan side. He was selected in the Australian team for the first test against Pakistan in 1981–82 over Graham Yallop and Dirk Wellham. A serious back injury cost him his place however, forcing him to withdraw. He withdrew from cricket for the season then in August 1982 retired altogether.

Kent later commented, "People say I retired because of a back injury. There's nothing untrue about that, but it wasn't the only reason – it was a trigger for me to start thinking about what the hell I was going to do for my future. We'd had World Series Cricket but there was still no money in the game, and I could see no clear line for a future in cricket (in which he was) earning enough money."

In 64 first-class matches he scored a total of 3567 runs at 36.03 with a best of 171 against Tasmania. He was a fine slip catcher, taking 60 catches in all.

== Post-Cricket ==
Kent briefly returned to cricket in April 1987 to play a charity match at the WACA. He scored 67 but was in severe pain the next day.

Kent was assistant coach for the Queensland cricket side in the early 1990s. He later ran a pub in Toowoomba and worked as secretary-manager of the Queensland Cricketers' Club.
