= Peter Enright =

Australian cricket umpire (1925–2015)

Peter Robert Enright (born 18 January 1925 – died in Brisbane, Queensland on 14 August 2015 aged 90) was an Australian cricket Test match umpire.

He umpired three Test matches between 1972 and 1974. His first match was between Australia and Pakistan at Melbourne on 29 December 1972 to 3 January 1973, won by Australia by 92 runs with Ian Redpath, Greg Chappell, Paul Sheahan, and John Benaud all scoring centuries. Enright's partner in this match was Jack Collins, also standing in his first Test match.

In the preceding season, 1971/72, a scheduled tour of Australia by South Africa was cancelled following political and moral protests against the apartheid policies of the South African government. In its place a 'World Team' visited Australia and played a series of Test standard, although never officially recognised. Enright stood in one of these matches, a rain-affected draw strongly in Australia's favour.

Enright's last Test match was between Australia and New Zealand at Adelaide on 26 to 31 January 1974, a match that Australia won by an innings. Enright's colleague was Jack Collins.

He was an inaugural umpire for World Series Cricket in 1977–78, along with Jack Collins, Col Hoy, Col Egar, Garry Duperouzal, and Douglas Sang Hue.

Until his death he was the oldest living test umpire in the world- a title then assumed by his good friend and umpiring colleague, Lou Rowan, just four months his junior.

== See also ==
- Australian Test Cricket Umpires
- List of test umpires
