= Jack Collins (umpire) =

Australian cricket Test match umpire (1932–2021)

Personal information
- Full name: John Richard Collins
- Born: 1 August 1932; Melbourne, Victoria, Australia
- Died: 18 June 2021 (aged 88); Melbourne, Victoria, Australia
- Role: Umpire

Umpiring information
- Tests umpired: 5 (1972–1975)
- ODIs umpired: 1 (1979)
- FC umpired: 41 (1965–1975)
- LA umpired: 9 (1970–1979)
- Source: CricketArchive, 5 July 2013

John Richard Collins (1 August 1932 – 18 June 2021) was an Australian cricket Test match umpire.

Collins umpired in five Test matches between 1972 and 1975. His first match was between Australia and Pakistan at Melbourne from 29 December 1972 to 3 January 1973. Collins' partner in this match was Peter Enright, also standing in his first Test match.

In the preceding season, 1971–72, a scheduled tour of Australia by South Africa was cancelled following political and moral protests against the apartheid policies of the South African government. In its place a 'World Team' visited Australia and played a series of Test standard, although never officially recognised. Collins stood in one of these matches, and witnessed Garfield Sobers score 254, an innings he later regarded as the greatest he ever saw.

Collins' last Test match was between Australia and the West Indies at Melbourne on 26 December to 30 December 1975, won by Australia by 8 wickets. Collins' colleague was Robin Bailhache. At the conclusion of the match, the West Indian captain Clive Lloyd strongly criticised Collins umpiring, requesting that he be replaced for the final test. Collins would never umpire another first-class match and was upset that he wasn't publicly supported by the Australian Cricket Board or the Victorian Cricket Association.

Collins also umpired one One Day International match in 1979.

== See also ==
- List of Test cricket umpires
- List of One Day International cricket umpires
