= Gary Duperouzel =

Australian cricket umpire

Personal information
- Full name: Gary Duperouzel

Umpiring information
- ODIs umpired: 1 (1980)
- Source: Cricinfo, 18 May 2014

Gary Duperouzel is a former Australian cricket umpire. He umpired at the first-class level. The only international match he officiated in was an ODI game in 1980.

== See also ==
- List of One Day International cricket umpires
