= Greg Chappell =

Australian cricketer (born 1948)

Greg Chappell AO MBE
Personal information
- Full name: Gregory Stephen Chappell
- Born: 7 August 1948 (age 78); Unley, South Australia
- Height: 6 ft 1 in (185 cm)
- Batting: Right-handed
- Bowling: Right arm medium
- Role: Top-order batter
- Relatives: Ian Chappell (brother); Trevor Chappell (brother); Vic Richardson (grandfather)

International information
- National side: Australia (1970-1984)
- Test debut (cap 251): 11 December 1970 v England
- Last Test: 6 January 1984 v Pakistan
- ODI debut (cap 1): 5 January 1971 v England
- Last ODI: 30 April 1983 v Sri Lanka

Domestic team information
- Years: Team
- 1966/67–1972/73: South Australia
- 1968–1969: Somerset
- 1973/74–1983/84: Queensland

Career statistics
Competition	Test	ODI	FC	LA
Matches	87	74	321	130
Runs scored	7,110	2,331	24,535	3,948
Batting average	53.86	40.18	52.20	36.89
100s/50s	24/31	3/14	74/111	4/27
Top score	247*	138*	247*	138*
Balls bowled	5,327	3,108	20,926	5,261
Wickets	47	72	291	130
Bowling average	40.70	29.12	29.95	25.93
5 wickets in innings	1	2	5	2
10 wickets in match	0	0	0	0
Best bowling	5/61	5/15	7/40	5/15
Catches/stumpings	122/–	23/–	376/–	54/1
Medal record
Men's Cricket
Representing Australia
ICC Cricket World Cup
Runner-up	1975 England
- Source: ESPNcricinfo, 14 November 2007

Gregory Stephen Chappell AO MBE (born 7 August 1948) is a former cricketer who represented Australia at international level in both Tests and One-Day Internationals (ODI). The second of three brothers to play Test cricket, Chappell was the pre-eminent Australian batsman of his time who allied elegant stroke making to fierce concentration. An exceptional all round player who bowled medium pace and, at his retirement, held the world record for the most catches in Test cricket, Chappell's career straddled two eras as the game moved toward a greater level of professionalism after the WSC schism. He was the vice captain of the Australian squad which finished as runners-up at the 1975 Cricket World Cup.

Since his retirement as a player in 1984, Chappell has pursued various business and media interests as well as maintaining connections to professional cricket; he has been a selector for national and Queensland teams, a member of the Australian Cricket Board, and a coach.

== Family and early life ==
Born in Unley, South Australia, Chappell was the second of three sons born in Adelaide to Arthur Martin and Jeanne Ellen (née Richardson), a Cornish Australian family. He was steeped in the game from a very early age: his father Martin was a noted grade cricketer in Adelaide who put a bat in his hands as soon as he could walk, while his maternal grandfather was the all-round sportsman Vic Richardson, who had captained Australia in Test cricket. Elder brother Ian and younger brother Trevor also played for Australia, and Greg closely followed in Ian's footsteps to the top. Given weekly lessons by coach Lynn Fuller, the brothers fought out fierce backyard cricket matches, with no holds barred. The fraternal relationship between Ian and Greg became legendary in Australian cricketing history for volatile verbal slanging matches, even during hard fought Test matches, which had their genesis in the family backyard.

Chappell attended St Leonards primary school, where he played his first competitive match at the age of eight; he also played a lot of baseball. Quite small for his age, Chappell developed a technique for dealing with the high bouncing ball by playing most of his shots to the leg side. Aged twelve, he hit his first centuries and was selected for the South Australian state schools team. He was then enrolled at Plympton high school for two years before following brother Ian and attending Prince Alfred College on a scholarship. Chappell recalled himself being an "economical" student whose mind often wandered to the cricket field during class. In the summer of 1964–65, Chappell suddenly grew ten centimetres in seven weeks and within twelve months had shot up to 189 cm. With this greater physical presence, Chappell was able to dominate schoolboy matches; in one of his matches for the school's First XI he scored a double ton and combined with classmate (and future Test teammate) Ashley Woodcock to put on more than 300 runs for the first wicket against Scotch College. Chappell's cricket coach at Prince Alfred, former first-class player Chester Bennett, described Chappell as "possibly the finest all-round schoolboy cricketer in my experience...he could go far in the game."

== Cricket career ==
=== Early first-class career ===
The Chappell brothers played grade cricket for Glenelg and they batted together for the first time in a semi final against Port Adelaide in early 1966. Later that year, Ian was chosen for the Test tour to South Africa, which opened up a place in the South Australian team. Greg seized the opportunity by scoring 101*, 102* and 88 for his club, then made his first-class debut against Victoria at Adelaide Oval, aged 18. Hampered by a throat infection, Chappell still managed 53 and 62* to earn an extended trial in the team. The remainder of the season brought another 386 runs in 14 innings, including a maiden century against Queensland.

With the return of the Test players the following summer, Chappell held his place in the South Australian team and was promoted to the number four position, following brother Ian at number three. The highlight of Chappell's season was a brilliant 154 against Western Australia, but his continuing preference for leg side shots was seen as a weakness if he wanted to make Test cricket. During a brief dressing room encounter with the great Don Bradman, then a state and national selector, Chappell was advised to change his grip on the bat in order to improve his off-side play. Without hesitation, Chappell made the recommended change and at season's end, wrote to the English county team Somerset, asking for a contract to play county cricket to further his development.

During two seasons with the county, Chappell scored 2493 first-class runs at a moderate average of 30. Hitherto, Chappell bowled leg spin, but after his growth spurt had found it difficult to land the ball on a consistent length. The green pitches in England encouraged him to experiment with seam-up medium pace, which produced immediate results: he finished with 71 wickets for Somerset, including 7 for 40 against Yorkshire at Leeds in 1969. In his first season, he was capped by Somerset after belting the Middlesex attack for three hours in making 148. Shortly after he was hit a severe blow to the eye when hooking at a bouncer from England fast bowler John Snow in a match against Sussex. In between these stints in England, Chappell scored 707 runs (including two centuries) in the 1968–69 Australian season, which made him a favourite to break into the Australian squad for the tour of India and South Africa. His subsequent omission in favour of West Australian unknown Jock Irvine caused a sensation at the time.

=== Early test career (1970–1973) ===
Entering the 1969–70 season, Chappell hit four hundreds to earn a place on an Australian A trip to New Zealand. Scoring 519 runs at 57.70, he was the dominant batsman of the tour and with the Test team failing in South Africa, he only needed a solid start to the next season to force his way in to play against England in the 1970–71 Ashes Series. After acting as twelfth man in the first Test, he was selected to bat at number seven for the second match, the first Test played at Perth's WACA ground. During an historic century on debut, he teamed with Ian Redpath to add 219 runs and haul Australia out of a difficult situation. Just days after the Test, he belted 102 in two hours against the English in a tour match. However, the dream start affected Chappell, who struggled for the rest of the series, apart from a score of 65 in the last Test. In the main, he was getting out by playing too many big shots early in his innings.

The inconsistent form continued the following season, when he was omitted from the Australian team for the series with a Rest of the World XI. Press criticism led to a rethink of his mental approach, and when reinstated a new Chappell emerged. He invented what became known as the Chappell "vee" where he played the ball exclusively in a narrow arc between mid off and mid on until he felt he had his eye in. This reorganisation brought him scores of 115* and 197* in the third and fourth unofficial Tests.

Chappell's new-found approach continued to yield results on the 1972 Ashes tour of England. Going into the second Test at Lord's Cricket Ground, Australia was down 1–0, after losing the first Test at Old Trafford by 89 runs. In a match that would be remembered for Bob Massie's remarkable 16-wicket haul, Chappell's masterful 131 in Australia's first innings was a key component in squaring the series. Coming in after Australia had lost its first two wickets with only seven runs on the board, Chappell combined with older brother Ian to steady the innings. The pair put on 75 runs for the third wicket, with Chappell happy to hold down one end while Ian took charge of the scoring. Chappell would not score his first boundary until three hours into his innings, but thereafter the runs flowed. He managed to bring up a well-deserved century just before the close of play on Day Two, and batted for a further hour-and-a-half the next day before he was bowled by Basil D'Oliveira. He had batted for over six hours and hit 14 boundaries. Chappell himself rated this his best innings, as did Richie Benaud, who wrote:

...I thought it close to the most flawless innings I had seen and I still believe that to be the case. It was beautifully elegant with wonderfully executed strokes, great technique and it exhibited a deep knowledge of what was needed to square the series

His game went from strength to strength. In the fifth Test at the Oval, he hit another ton, sharing a big partnership with Ian as they became the first brothers to score Test centuries in the same innings. Against Pakistan he made 116* and 62 at Melbourne and bagged 5 for 61 at Sydney. On the subsequent trip to the West Indies, he achieved the rare feat of scoring a thousand runs on a Caribbean tour, which included 106 in the Test at Bridgetown, Barbados.

In recognition of his outstanding 1972 Ashes tour, Chappell was named, along with fellow Australians Bob Massie, Dennis Lillee and Keith Stackpole, as one of the Wisden Cricketers of the Year in 1973.

With the Australian team now undergoing a dramatic renaissance, Chappell was the leading batsman, giving him a huge national profile. This brought a lucrative offer to move to Brisbane and captain the Queensland team, as a precursor to taking over the Australian captaincy when Ian decided to retire. He made the move in the winter of 1973.

=== Move to Queensland (1973–1974) ===
The interest in his arrival in Queensland was enormous as he was expected to lead the state to its first Sheffield Shield title. Although Chappell gathered more than a thousand runs in the shield matches alone, Queensland was thwarted in the last match of the season by a devastating spell from young New South Wales fast bowler Jeff Thomson. Learning of the bowler's dissatisfaction with his home state, Chappell persuaded Thomson to move to Queensland for the following season. Chappell then departed for Australia's first Test-playing tour of New Zealand. The Chappell brothers shattered records in the Wellington Test, as Ian and Greg scored centuries in both innings, the only such instance. Greg's effort of 380 runs in a Test match (247* and 133) remained a record until beaten by Graham Gooch in 1990.

Unfortunately for Chappell, his health was now blighted by recurring tonsillitis and he found it difficult to bat for long periods during the 1974–75 Ashes series. He was the backbone of Australia's sometimes inconsistent batting, scoring 608 runs at 55.3. At Sydney, where Australia won to reclaim the Ashes, Chappell dominated with 84 and 144, which he followed up with a century in a losing cause in the sixth Test at Melbourne. At Perth, he broke the world record for a fielder by snaring seven catches. Ironically, his grandfather Vic Richardson was one of several players who held the old record of six. Chappell reluctantly had his tonsils removed, but he quickly lost a lot of weight which affected his performance on the tour of England that followed. He played in the World Cup (for what proved to be the only time), then made only one good score (73* at Lords) in the four Ashes Tests that followed.

=== Australian captain (1975–1977) ===
Sufficiently recovered, Chappell totally dominated the season of 1975–76, amassing a record 1547 first-class runs at an average of 85.9, with five centuries. Appointed as Australian captain, Chappell began with a century in each innings to win the first Test against the West Indies in his adopted home town of Brisbane. This performance was unique in Test cricket at the time (later replicated by Virat Kohli of India in 2014). He led the team to an overwhelming 5–1 win and the title of unofficial world champions. His personal highlight was a classic 182* in the Sydney Test.

The peak of Australia's form proved to be brief. The team lost a number of players to early retirement, mainly because remuneration was so poor. Chappell was able to parlay his position into a reasonable income with his Queensland contract and personal endorsements, but he still needed to develop business interests in life insurance outside the game. His leadership abilities were tested in the summer of 1976–77 as a number of new players were blooded and Jeff Thomson was laid low by long-term injury. Australia received much criticism for defensive play during a drawn series with Pakistan, but Chappell's form was faultless, and he scored 121 and 67 in the only Test victory. The tour to New Zealand that followed was similar; it was clear Australia was in a rebuilding phase. During the Test at Auckland, a streaker appeared when Chappell was at the crease. Incensed by this new craze and the disruption that it caused, Chappell grabbed the man and hit his bare backside with the bat. When play resumed, the ensuing din from the incident caused Chappell to mis-hear his partner's call for a run, and he found himself run out. For once, the Chappell concentration had been broken. But the most significant occurrence of this match occurred off-field: Chappell was approached to sign with a proposed break away competition, later to be known as World Series Cricket (WSC).

Chappell formally signed a WSC contract the following month, during the Centenary Test, a one-off match against England commemorating one hundred years of Test cricket. He was offered the most lucrative WSC contract in line with his age and high profile as captain of Australia. Chappell led Australia to a dramatic victory. Some of his players felt that he struggled to cope with the pressure of captaincy during the tense England run chase on the final day, when Australia won a dramatic victory, due to by a marathon bowling spell from Dennis Lillee. But Lillee's absence for the forthcoming tour of England would hamper Chappell's campaign to retain the Ashes.

News of the WSC break away was leaked early in the tour, and Chappell quickly found himself besieged. Tour officials and administrators back home questioned his loyalty, journalists were constantly looking for comment, while non-WSC players in the squad accused him of bias in team selections. Leading an inexperienced team in often inclement weather sapped his confidence, while the English bowlers, knowing that he was the key wicket, constantly put him under pressure. After a brave 44 and 112 failed to save the second Test at Manchester, his form fell away and the team slipped to a 0–3 loss.

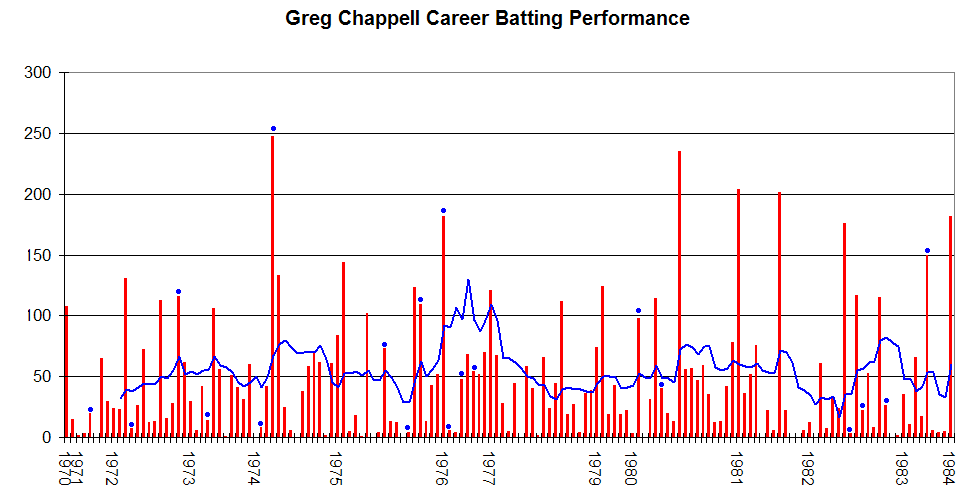
Greg Chappell's career performance graph.

Chappell, who was a tremendous player of pace bowling, is regarded as one of the greatest batsmen ever to play for Australia. Although adept in all aspects of batting, he was especially noted as a strong player on the on side (or leg side) of the wicket. The English writer and commentator John Arlott wrote of him in 1977:

He was – indeed, is – one of the three finest batsmen in the world; probably the best onside player of modern times; quick in reaction, superbly poised, an immaculate stylist.

=== World Series Cricket (1977–1979) ===
Chappell was happy for brother Ian to captain the WSC Australian team, which allowed him to concentrate on his batting. In the first season of WSC, he scored 661 runs at an average of 60. The Australians struggled against the array of talented players assembled to represent the West Indian and World teams, and the emphasis on fast bowling destroyed the confidence of many batsmen, who took to wearing helmets for safety. Chappell eventually opted for a helmet with temple guards only – he never wore one with a grille. He never missed an opportunity to slip into a cap when facing medium pace or spin.

In the final "Supertest" of the first season, Chappell captained the Australian team as his brother had suffered a broken finger. After four losses in five matches, the Australians turned matters around, thanks to a magnificent 246* by Greg Chappell, the highest innings played during the existence of WSC. However, the constant fast bowling got to Chappell in the next season, and he managed to pass fifty in the Supertests just once. With a WSC tour of the West Indies looming, Chappell was diagnosed with Bell's Palsy and one side of his face was paralysed. Doctors and family advised him to miss the trip, but Chappell was determined to go and utilise a modified technique he had devised for facing the relentless fast bowling.

After a slow start, Chappell hit the richest vein of form in his career. In quick succession, he scored 45 and 90 in Barbados, 7 and 150 in Trinidad, 113 in Guyana and finished his WSC career with 104 and 85 in Antigua, all scored against an attack of Andy Roberts, Michael Holding, Colin Croft and Joel Garner on their home wickets. Unfortunately for Chappell, WSC matches are not included in official statistics as he scored five hundreds in 14 Supertests and a total of 1,415 runs at 56.6 average. In all, he missed 24 Test matches during his exile from official cricket.

=== Post-WSC years (1979–1984) ===
When WSC players rejoined official cricket for 1979–80, there was plenty of debate over the Australian captaincy. Chappell was the far from unanimous choice, but led the Test team in twin series, against England (won 3–0) and West Indies (lost 0–2), and the first triangular ODI series where Australia failed to reach the final. It was a mixed bag of results and the programming came in for some criticism. Chappell led by example in scoring 74 and 124 in the Brisbane Test against the West Indies in his comeback to Test cricket. His 98* guided Australia to victory over England at Sydney, then 114 and 40* extracted a similar result at Melbourne. While he averaged 44 with the bat and claimed seven wickets in the ODIs, a constant shuffling of positions ensured an uneven Australian performance.

Despite protesting the strenuous nature of the players' workload in this new era, Chappell found himself leading the team to Pakistan two weeks after the end of the Australian season. Pakistan narrowly won the first Test, then prepared featherbed wickets for the remaining two matches. At Faisalabad, Chappell made 235 and as a protest at the pitch, allowed all eleven Australians to have a bowl in Pakistan's innings – the first time this had happened in a Test since 1884. Australia lost the series 0–1. Later in the year, Australia played a second Centenary Test, this time to commemorate the first Test played in England, and the match (played at Lords) ended in a draw due to poor weather. One of only four players who played both matches, Chappell scored 47 and 59, but his best remembered contribution to the match was an attempted citizen's arrest (along with England captain Ian Botham) of an MCC member who attacked one of the umpires in a very ill-tempered scene.

The 1980–81 season brought another three-way competition, this time with New Zealand and India. In the Tests, Australia had a convincing win over the Kiwis, but was held to a drawn series against India. Chappell was in good form throughout the summer, but managed only two international centuries. The first came at Sydney in an ODI against New Zealand, when Chappell set a then record Australian score of 138*. Early in the new year, on the same ground, he played his first Test against India. Despite suffering a bad stomach upset, Chappell hit 204, an innings described by Wisden as "masterly". However, this season is best remembered for the triangular ODI series, specifically the third of the best of five finals series, played in Melbourne on 1 February 1981 (See #Underarm controversy, below).

Chappell experienced his only extended run of poor form during the 1981–82 Australian season, which featured Test and One Day matches against the West Indies and Pakistan. His 201 in the second test of the season, against Pakistan, was his only score of note and he registered seven ducks in total in the international matches, including four consecutive ducks spread across two Test matches and two One Day matches. Chappell's average in the Test matches was 30.6 (13.6 without the double century) and his average in the One Day matches was 17.7.

From 1981 onwards, Chappell did not make himself available for most overseas tours. Thus Kim Hughes was captain for the 1981 and 1982 tours of England and Pakistan respectively, before Chappell was returned the captaincy for the Australian summers of 1981–82 and 1982–83. Chappell retired as captain in 1983, playing his last test series (1983–84) under Hughes as captain.

=== Summary ===
Chappell was batsman of the ODI team concurrently with his Test captaincy, registering 21 wins and 25 losses from 49 matches; all but four of these matches were after the end of World Series Cricket, and Chappell never captained Australia in a Cricket World Cup tournament. His batting exploits in ODIs were not quite of the same magnitude as his Test match career, but he did hold the Australian record single-innings score (138 not against New Zealand in 1980) for more than ten years. His ODI captaincy career is most commonly remembered for the "underarm" incident in 1981 (see below).

Chappell played his last Test match in January 1984, making 182 in his final innings. Thus, Chappell became the first Test batsman in history to score centuries in both his first and last Test innings. Of all the Test batsmen who have retired since 1974 and scored more than 2,000 Test runs, Chappell's Test batting average of 53.86 is the third highest, behind Kumar Sangakkara (57.41) and Jacques Kallis (55.37). And if Chappell's batting average in Kerry Packer's "Supertests" (the hardest cricket Chappell says he ever played) were added to his test record, his overall average would be 54.30

Greg Chappell's Captaincy Record
Season	Opponent	Played	Won	Lost	Drawn
1975–76	West Indies(home)	6	5	1	0
1976–77	Pakistan (home)	3	1	1	1
1976–77	New Zealand (away)	2	1	0	1
1976–77	England (home)	1	1	0	0
1977	England (away)	5	0	3	2
1979–80	West Indies (home)	3	0	2	1
1979–80	England (home)	3	3	0	0
1979–80	Pakistan (away)	3	0	1	2
1980	England (away)	1	0	0	1
1980–81	New Zealand (home)	3	2	0	1
1980–81	India (home)	3	1	1	1
1981–82	Pakistan (home)	3	2	1	0
1981–82	West Indies (home)	3	1	1	1
1981–82	New Zealand (away)	3	1	1	1
1982–83	England (home)	5	2	1	2
1982–83	Sri Lanka (away)	1	1	0	0
	Total	48	21	13	14

== Controversies ==
=== Underarm bowling incident ===
Chappell instigated the underarm bowling incident in the New Zealand–Australia One Day International on 1 February 1981. With the series tied at 1–1, Australia looked to have gained the upper hand by batting first and setting New Zealand a chase of 235 runs. Undisciplined bowling and fielding by the Australians, and a great innings from Kiwi opener Bruce Edgar, left a target of 15 runs needed with one over to play. Chappell's younger brother, Trevor, a batting all-rounder who specialised in bowling at the end of an innings, delivered the final over. From the first five balls, Trevor Chappell took two for 8, leaving the new batsman (Brian McKechnie) to score a six to tie the game.

At this point, Greg Chappell intervened, telling his brother to deliver the ball along the ground (i.e. underarm) and informing the umpire to let the batsman know of the change of bowling style. Despite the protestations of wicketkeeper Rod Marsh, the ball was delivered and the batsman simply put his bat in front of the ball to stop. He then hurled his bat away. A large crowd of 50,000 – mostly Australian – loudly booed the Australian team from the field. The New Zealand Prime Minister Rob Muldoon said it was "the most disgusting incident I can recall in the history of cricket", the Australian Prime Minister Malcolm Fraser said it was "contrary to the traditions of the game", and the Chappells' decision was universally condemned. Both brothers have since expressed regret and embarrassment over the incident.

=== Ganguly controversy ===
Chappell's first overseas tour as the coach of the Indian team was to Zimbabwe in September 2005. Sourav Ganguly, the Indian captain, scored a century in the first Test match and later alleged that coach Chappell had asked him to step down as captain on the eve of the game. This was widely covered by the Indian media. Ganguly was later dropped from the Indian cricket team by the selectors on the grounds of poor form, but many in the media suggested his omission was influenced by the previous row with Chappell.

=== Book on Rahul Dravid ===
In his book, Chappell gave rise to fresh controversy by claiming that Rahul Dravid as captain didn't receive the kind of support he gave to other captains and his success was not enjoyed by some of his teammates.

== Post-retirement ==
=== Selector ===
==== Australian selector 1984–88 ====
Shortly after Chappell retired from cricket he was appointed selector for the Australian team and also became a member of the Australian Cricket Board. This was a time of rebuilding for the national team, with many players lost through retirement and the South African rebel tours. He resigned from both positions in mid-1988, before the Australian team revived but by which time many key players in that revival had been selected, including David Boon, Geoff Marsh, Merv Hughes and Steve Waugh.

The decisions made by the panel when Chappell was a selector included encouraging Kim Hughes to resign, not selecting Hughes for the 1985 Ashes, trying Wayne Phillips, Greg Dyer and Tim Zoehrer as wicket-keepers, and fast-tracking Craig McDermott and Ian Healy into the national team.

==== Australian selector 2010–11 ====
Chappell was made a selector of the Australian national team on 29 October 2010, replacing Merv Hughes. The "Argus Review" led to Chappell, along with selector Andrew Hilditch and coach Tim Nielsen, being sacked in August 2011. It emerged at the time that Chappell was banned from the Australian dressing room at the request of the players.

=== Coach ===
==== South Australian coach ====
From the late 1990s Chappell coached South Australia for five seasons during which time the team failed to win a single trophy.

==== Pakistan consultant ====
In 2004, he fulfilled a consultancy role for Pakistan's National Cricket Academy

==== Indian coach ====
In May 2005, he was appointed coach of the Indian national cricket team for a two-year term until the World Cup 2007. He earned about US$175,000 as salary from the BCCI every year.

This role was the subject of negative public and media commentary, for his tinkering with the batting lineup and his coaching methods. Several senior Indian players criticised Chappell's methods, including Virender Sehwag, Harbhajan Singh, and Zaheer Khan His coaching and methods came into question as India crashed out of the 2007 Cricket World Cup in the first round, the first time since the 1992 Cricket World Cup, leading to Chappell's resignation.

==== Other ====
Chappell has served as an academy coach for the Rajasthan Royals, and was hired as the All Stars Coach for the 2008 Twenty20 match against Australia. He also serves as the executive coach for a series of Cricket Summer Camps in the United States as part of Chappell Way.

=== Commentator ===
Chappell has worked as a cricket commentator for both Channel 9 and ABC radio.

== Personal life ==
During the early part of his career, since being a cricketer was not yet a full-time profession, Chappell worked in a variety of jobs, including at a life assurance firm, an oil company, and as a promotions officer with Coca-Cola bottlers in Adelaide. He married Judith Elizabeth Donaldson, a schoolteacher from Bexley in New South Wales, in 1971. The couple had three children: older son Stephen was born in 1975, daughter Belinda was born in 1977 just before Chappell's departure for the 1977 Ashes tour, and younger son Jonathan was born in 1980. Stephen pursured a career in the Royal Australian Air Force as a pilot and later rose to the position of Chief of Air Force in 2024, the most senior position in RAAF. Whilst, Jonathan from an early age, chose to pursue baseball, which his father and uncle had also played during their childhood, and played Minor League Baseball from 2004 to 2005.

Chappell is a vegan.

== Awards and recognition ==
Chappell was appointed Member of the Order of the British Empire in the 1979 New Year Honours. He was made an Officer of the Order of Australia in the 2021 Australia Day Honours for "distinguished service to cricket as a leading player, captain, coach and administrator at the elite level, and to a range of charitable foundations".

Chappell was inducted into the Sport Australia Hall of Fame in 1986.

In 2002, he was inducted into the Australian Cricket Hall of Fame.

== See also ==
- List of international cricket centuries by Greg Chappell

Preceded by Don Bradman	Highest Australian runscorer in Test cricket 1984–1987	Succeeded by Allan Border
Preceded by Ian Chappell	Highest Australian runscorer in ODI cricket 1977–1985	Succeeded by Allan Border
Preceded by John Wright	Indian cricket team coach 2005–2007	Succeeded by Ravi Shastri
