= Ian Chappell =

Australian cricketer (born 1943)

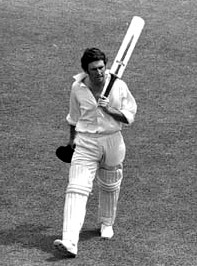

Personal information
- Full name: Ian Michael Chappell
- Born: 26 September 1943 (age 83); Unley, South Australia
- Nickname: Chappelli
- Height: 1.80 m (5 ft 11 in)
- Batting: Right-handed
- Bowling: Right-arm leg spin
- Role: Top-order batter
- Relatives: Greg Chappell (brother); Trevor Chappell (brother); Vic Richardson (grandfather)

International information
- National side: Australia (1964–1980)
- Test debut (cap 231): 4 December 1964 v Pakistan
- Last Test: 6 February 1980 v England
- ODI debut (cap 2): 5 January 1971 v England
- Last ODI: 14 January 1980 v England

Domestic team information
- Years: Team
- 1961/62–1979/80: South Australia
- 1963: Lancashire

Career statistics
Competition	Test	ODI	FC	LA
Matches	75	16	262	37
Runs scored	5,345	673	19,680	1,277
Batting average	42.42	48.07	48.35	39.90
100s/50s	14/26	0/8	59/96	0/13
Top score	196	86	209	93*
Balls bowled	2,873	42	13,143	202
Wickets	20	2	176	5
Bowling average	65.80	11.50	37.57	28.40
5 wickets in innings	0	0	2	0
10 wickets in match	0	0	0	0
Best bowling	2/21	2/14	5/29	2/14
Catches/stumpings	105/–	5/–	312/1	20/–
Medal record
Men's Cricket
Representing Australia
ICC Cricket World Cup
Runner-up	1975 England
- Source: Cricinfo, 13 November 2007

Ian Michael Chappell (born 26 September 1943) is an Australian commentator and former cricketer. Known as "Chappelli", he is considered as one of the greatest captains the game has seen. He captained Australia between 1971 and 1975 before taking a central role in the breakaway World Series Cricket organisation. Born into a cricketing family—his grandfather and brother also captained Australia—Chappell made a hesitant start to international cricket playing as a right-hand middle-order batsman and spin bowler. He found his niche when promoted to bat at number three. Chappell's blunt verbal manner led to a series of confrontations with opposition players and cricket administrators; the issue of sledging first arose during his tenure as captain, and he was a driving force behind the professionalisation of Australian cricket in the 1970s. He was the captain of the Australian squad which finished as runners-up at the 1975 Cricket World Cup.

John Arlott called him "a cricketer of effect rather than the graces". An animated presence at the batting crease, he constantly adjusted his equipment and clothing, and restlessly tapped his bat on the ground as the bowler ran in. Basing his game on a sound defence learned during many hours of childhood lessons, Chappell employed the drive and square cut to full effect. He had an idiosyncratic method of playing back and across to a ball of full length and driving wide of mid-on, but his trademark shot was the hook, saying "three bouncers an over should be worth 12 runs to me". A specialist slip fielder, he was the fourth player to take one hundred Test catches.

Since his retirement in 1980, he has pursued a high-profile career as a sports journalist and cricket commentator, predominantly with Channel Nine. He remains a key figure in Australian cricket: in 2006, Shane Warne called Chappell the biggest influence on his career. Chappell was inducted into the Sport Australia Hall of Fame in 1986, the FICA Cricket Hall of Fame in 2000 and the Australian Cricket Hall of Fame in 2003. On 9 July 2009, Ian Chappell was inducted into the ICC Cricket Hall of Fame.

== Family and early career ==
The first of four sons (Ian, Greg, Trevor, Michel) born in Unley, near Adelaide, to Martin and Jeanne (née Richardson), Chappell was steeped in the game from an early age. His father was a noted Adelaide grade cricketer who put a bat in his hands as soon as he could walk, and his maternal grandfather was famous all-round sportsman Vic Richardson, who captained Australia at the end of a nineteen-Test career. Chappell was given weekly batting lessons from the age of five, as were younger brothers Greg and Trevor, who both also went on to play for Australia.

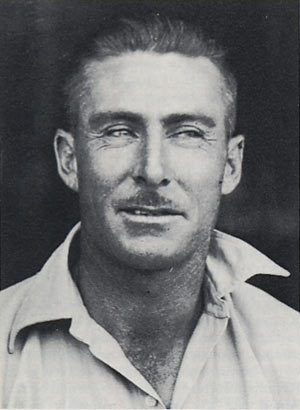
Chappell's maternal grandfather Vic Richardson

Chappell grew up in the beachside suburb of Glenelg and attended the local St Leonard's Primary School where he played his first competitive match at the age of seven. He was later selected for the South Australian state schoolboys team. He then enrolled at Prince Alfred College, a private secondary school noted for producing many Test cricketers, including the Australian captains Joe Darling and Clem Hill. His other sporting pursuits included Australian football and baseball: Chappell's performances for South Australia in the Claxton Shield won him All-Australian selection in 1964 and 1966 as a catcher. He credits Vic Richardson, who had represented both SA and Australia in baseball during the 1920s, for his love of the sport. At the age of 18, his form in grade cricket for Glenelg led to his first-class debut for South Australia (SA) against Tasmania in early 1962.

The aggressive style of Sobers and of South Australia captain Les Favell heavily influenced Chappell during his formative years in senior cricket. In 1962–63, Chappell made his initial first-class century against a New South Wales team led by Australian captain Richie Benaud, who was bemused by the young batsman's habit of gritting his teeth as he faced up; to Benaud, it looked as if he was grinning. Chappell spent the northern summer of 1963 as a professional in England's Lancashire League with Ramsbottom and played a single first-class match for Lancashire against Cambridge University.

== International career ==
In 1963–64, Chappell batted at number three for SA for the first time, in a match against Queensland at Brisbane, and scored 205 not out. He was the youngest member of the SA team that won the Sheffield Shield that season. A century against Victoria early the following season resulted in Chappell's selection for a one-off Test against Pakistan at Melbourne in December 1964. He made 11 and took four catches, but was dropped until the Fourth Test in the 1965–66 Ashes series. Chappell supplemented his aggressive batting with brilliant fielding in the slips, and he showed promise as a leg-spinner. At this point, the selectors and captain Bob Simpson considered him an all-rounder: he batted at number seven and bowled 26 (eight-ball) overs for the match.

=== Hesitant start ===
He retained his place for the following Test and for the tour of South Africa in summer 1966–67. Playing in a team defeated 1–3, Chappell struggled to make an impression. His highest score in ten Test innings was 49, while his five wickets cost 59 runs each. On the advice of Simpson, he ceased playing the hook shot as it was often leading to his dismissal. In the first Test of 1967–68 against India, he failed twice batting in the middle order. Heading into the second Test at Melbourne, Chappell's place was in jeopardy, but he rode his luck to score 151 – his innings contained five chances that the Indians failed to take. However, in the remainder of the series, he managed only 46 runs in four innings, so his selection for the 1968 tour of England was based as much on potential as form.

In England, Chappell rewarded the faith of the selectors by scoring the most first-class runs on the tour (1,261 runs, including 202 not out against Warwickshire), leading the Australian Test aggregates with 348 runs (at 43.50). His top score was 81 in the fourth Test at Leeds. Wisden lauded his play off the back foot and judged him the most difficult Australian batsman to dismiss.

=== Promotion to number three ===
A string of big scores and a record number of catches during the 1968–69 season earned Chappell the Australian Cricketer of the Year award. Against the touring West Indies, Chappell hit 188 not out, 123, 117, 180 and 165 before the New Year. Two of these centuries came in the Test series, when Chappell's average for 548 runs was 68.50. Chappell was elevated to number three in the batting order and became a less-frequent bowler; he was also appointed vice-captain of the team.

Following up with a successful tour of India in late 1969, Chappell demonstrated his fluency against spin bowling by compiling Test innings of 138 at Delhi and 99 at Kolkata. His ability against both fast and slow bowling earned high praise, including from his captain Bill Lawry. When the Australians arrived in South Africa in early 1970, following their victory over India, Lawry told the local media that Chappell was the best all-round batsman in the world. His appraisal looked misguided when Chappell managed just 92 runs (at 11.5 average), with a top score of 34, as Australia lost 0–4.

On this tour, Chappell clashed with cricket administrators over pay and conditions for the first time. The South African authorities requested that an extra Test be added to the fixture and the Australian Board of Control consented. Incensed that the players were not consulted about the change, Chappell led a group of his teammates in a demand for more money to play the proposed game. Eventually the match was cancelled after Chappell and his supporters refused to back down.

=== Captaincy ===
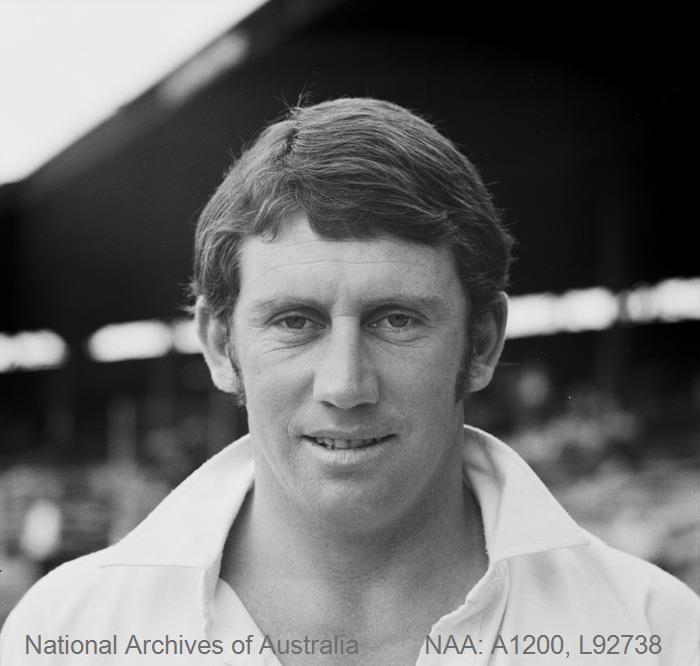
Chappell in 1971

Chappell became South Australian captain when the long-serving Les Favell retired at the start of the 1970–1971 season. His younger brother Greg made his debut in the second Test of the summer against Ray Illingworth's England. Facing an English attack led by the hostile fast bowling of John Snow, Chappell scored a half-century in each of the first two Tests, but failed to capitalise on good starts while Greg Chappell scored 108 in his initial innings. Rain caused the abandonment of the third Test without a ball being bowled. Temporarily promoted to open the batting, Chappell failed in the fourth Test as Australia lost. In the fifth Test at Melbourne, he returned to number three and started nervously. Dropped on 0 and 14, Chappell found form and went on to post his maiden Ashes century (111 from 212 balls), which he followed with scores of 28 and 104 in the sixth Test.

The washed-out Test resulted in a late change to the schedule and an unprecedented seventh Test was played at Sydney in February 1971. Trailing 0–1 in the series, Australia could retain The Ashes by winning this game. Australia's performances were hampered by playing slow, defensive cricket. In a radical attempt to breathe some aggression into the team, the selectors sacked captain Bill Lawry and appointed Chappell in his stead. Dismayed by the manner of Lawry's dismissal, Chappell responded with an attacking performance as captain, he won the toss, put England in and dismissed them for 184, and Australia led the first innings by 80 runs, but set 223 to win they folded for 160 and lost The Ashes after holding them for 12 years. Chappell gained some consolation at the end of a dramatic summer when he led SA to the Sheffield Shield, the team's first win for seven years.

Chappell's battles against the short-pitched bowling of Snow during the season compelled him to reappraise his game. Following a conversation with Sir Donald Bradman, he decided to reinstate the hook shot and spent the winter months practising the stroke by hitting baseballs thrown by his brother Greg.

=== A team in his own image ===
Ian Chappell fashioned an Australian team in his own image between 1971 and 1975: aggressive, resourceful and insouciant.

— Gideon Haigh

Australia lost an unofficial Test series to a Rest of the World team led by Gary Sobers that toured in 1971–72 as a replacement for the politically unacceptable South Africans. Chappell was the outstanding batsman of the series, with four centuries included in his 634 runs, at an average of 79.25. He took the team to England in 1972 and was unlucky not to regain The Ashes in a rubber that ended 2–2. The series began disastrously for Chappell when he was out hooking from the first ball he faced in the opening Test at Manchester. He fell the same way in the second innings and Australia lost the match. However, the team regrouped and had the better of the remaining matches, apart from the fourth Test at Leeds, played on a controversial pitch that the Australians believed was "doctored" to suit the England team. Greg Chappell emerged as a prolific batsman during the series, batting one place below his brother in the order. The siblings shared several crucial partnerships, most notably 201 at the Oval in the last Test when they became the first brothers to score centuries in the same Test innings. Australia won the game, an effort that Chappell later cited as the turning point in the team's performances.

In 1972–73, Australia had resounding victories against Pakistan (at home) and the West Indies (away). Chappell's leadership qualities stood out in a number of tight situations. He hit his highest Test score of 196 (from 243 balls) in the first Test against Pakistan at Adelaide. Pakistan "appeared probable winners of the last two Tests on the second last day of each game", yet Chappell's team managed to win on both occasions.

On indifferent pitches in the Caribbean, Chappell was the highest-scoring batsman of the Test series with 542 runs (at 77.4 average). He hit 209 in a tour match against Barbados, two Test centuries and a "glorious" 97 on a poor pitch at Trinidad in the third Test, batting with an injured ankle. This set up a dramatic last day when the West Indies needed just 66 runs to win with six wickets in hand at lunch. The home team collapsed against an inspired Australian bowling attack supported by Chappell's aggressive field-placements.

=== The ugly Australians ===
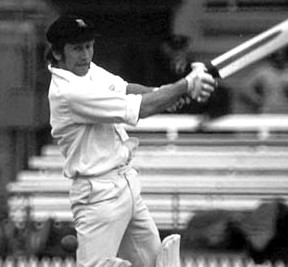
Ian Chappell in the early 1970s

Australia played six Tests against New Zealand on both sides of the Tasman in 1973–74. Chappell led his team to a 2–0 victory in the three Tests played in Australia. During the third Test at Adelaide, he equalled the world record of six catches in a Test match by a fielder, which was beaten by his brother Greg the following season. In the drawn first Test at Wellington, the Chappells became the first brothers to each score a century in both innings of a Test match. The Australians lost to the Kiwis for the first time ever in the second Test at Christchurch, when Chappell was involved in a verbal confrontation with the leading New Zealand batsman, Glenn Turner. The Australians then played an ill-tempered tour match at Dunedin that didn't enhance the reputation of Chappell or his team, before winning the final Test at Auckland. On this tour, the behaviour of the team was questioned with some journalists labelling them "ugly Australians". In 1976, Chappell wrote about his attitude to the opposition:

... although we didn't deliberately set out to be a 'bunch of bastards' when we walked on to the field, I'd much prefer any team I captained to be described like that than as 'a nice bunch of blokes on the field.' As captain of Australia my philosophy was simple: between 11.00am and 6.00pm there was no time to be a nice guy. I believed that on the field players should concentrate on giving their best to the team, to themselves and to winning; in other words, playing hard and fairly within the rules. To my mind, doing all that left no time for being a nice guy.

The increasing prevalence of verbal confrontation on the field (later known as sledging) concerned cricket administrators and became a regular topic for the media. Its instigation is sometimes attributed to Chappell. By his own admission, he was a frequent user of profanity who was often at "boiling point" on the field, but claims that the various incidents he was involved in were not a premeditated tactic. Rather, they were a case of him losing his temper with an opponent.

=== The Ashes regained and the first World Cup ===
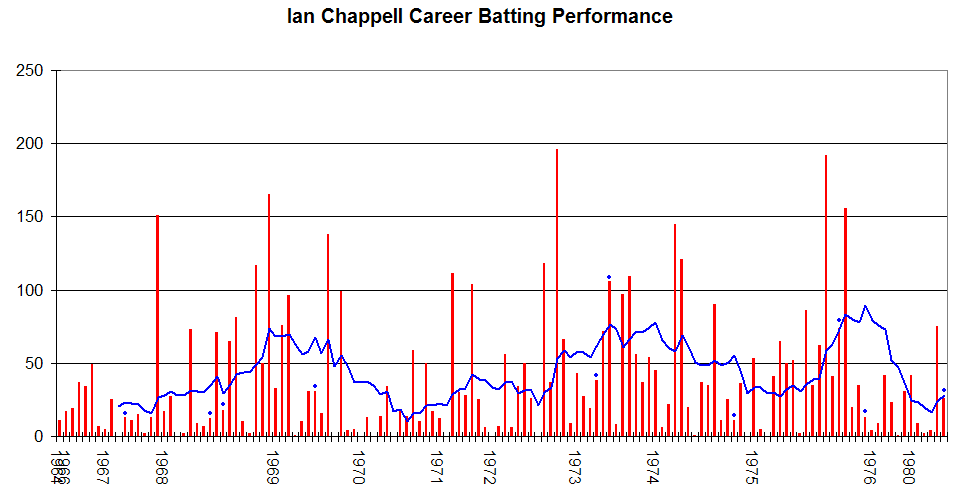
Ian Chappell's Test career batting performance. The red bars indicate the runs that he scored in an innings, with the blue line indicating the batting average in his last ten innings. The blue dots indicate an innings where he remained not out.

The highlight of Chappell's career was Australia's 4–1 win over England in 1974–75 that reclaimed The Ashes. Strengthened by the new fast bowling partnership of Dennis Lillee and Jeff Thomson, the Australians played aggressive cricket and received criticism for the amount of short-pitched bowling they employed. Chappell scored 90 on an "unreliable" pitch on the first day of the opening Test at Brisbane. He finished the six Tests with 387 runs at 35.18 average, and took 11 catches in the slips. The Test matches attracted big crowds and record gate takings, enabling Chappell to negotiate a bonus for the players from the Australian Cricket Board (ACB). Although this more than doubled the players' pay, their remuneration amounted to only 4.5% of the revenue generated by the series.

Within months, Chappell was back in England leading Australia in the inaugural World Cup. His dislike of the defensive nature of limited-over cricket led to the Australians placing a full slips cordon for the new ball and employing Test-match style tactics in the tournament. Despite the apparent unsuitability of this approach, Chappell guided the team to the final where they lost a memorable match to the West Indies.

The workload of the captaincy was telling on Chappell and the four-Test Ashes series that followed the World Cup dampened his appetite for the game. After winning the only completed match of the series, the first Test at Birmingham, Australia's retention of the Ashes was anticlimactic: the third Test at Leeds was abandoned due to vandalism of the pitch during the night before the last day's play. In the last Test at the Oval, Chappell scored 192 from 367 balls to set up an apparent victory. However, England managed to bat for almost 15 hours to grind out a draw and Chappell announced his resignation from the captaincy on the final day of the match. In 30 Tests as captain, he scored 2,550 runs at an average of 50, with seven centuries.

=== First retirement ===
Remaining available for Test cricket, he played in the 1975–76 series against the West Indies under the captaincy of his brother Greg. Australia avenged their loss in the World Cup final by winning 5–1, claiming the unofficial title of best team in the world. During the season, Chappell incurred censure for his behaviour in a Sheffield Shield match and was warned not to continue wearing a pair of adidas boots with the three stripes clearly visible. This breached the prevailing protocol of cricketers wearing all white. His highest innings of the summer was 156 during Australia's only loss, at Perth in the second Test. Wisden nominated him as the most influential player of the series for his 449 runs at an average of 44.90. Throughout the course of the series, Chappell passed two significant milestones when he became the fourth Australian to make 5,000 runs in Test cricket and the first player to hold one hundred Test catches for Australia. The summer ended in controversy and triumph in the domestic competition. During a dispute with the SACA over team selection, he threatened a "strike" action by the SA team. After the matter was resolved, Chappell led the team to the Sheffield Shield title for the second time in his career and shared the inaugural Sheffield Shield player of the season award with his brother Greg. He retired from first-class cricket at the end of the season, aged only 32.

== World Series Cricket and aftermath ==
In 1976, Chappell toured South Africa with Richie Benaud's International Wanderers team, released his autobiography Chappelli and was named as one of five Wisden Cricketers of the Year. He was hired to spend the summer of 1976–77 as a guest professional in the Melbourne district competition where he was paid more than he had been as Australian captain. During the season, he was involved in a famous altercation with a young English all-rounder who was in Victoria on a cricketing scholarship, Ian Botham. Both men have put forward vastly different versions as to what happened during the physical confrontation in a Melbourne pub. The animosity between them continues and Channel Nine used it as a marketing ploy when Botham temporarily partnered Chappell as a television commentator during the 1998–99 season. Botham again revived the feud in his 2007 autobiography with another version of the incident.

=== Rebel skipper ===
Throughout his career, Chappell found the ACB obdurate in his attempts to make a living from the game. In 1969 and 1970, they refused his applications to play professionally in England. As Australian captain, he made several unsuccessful representations at ACB meetings in an effort to secure a more realistic financial deal for the Australian players. In consultations with the then-president of the ACTU, Bob Hawke, he explored the possibility of unionising the players.

Approached to lead an Australian team in World Series Cricket (WSC), a breakaway professional competition organised by Kerry Packer for Channel Nine, Chappell signed a three-year contract worth A$75,000 in 1976. His participation was, "fundamental to the credibility of the enterprise". Chappell devised the list of Australian players to be signed, and was involved in the organisation and marketing of WSC. His central role was the result of, "years of personal disaffection with cricket officialdom", in particular Don Bradman. Recently, Chappell wrote:

While captaining Australia, I was approached on three separate occasions before WSC to play 'professional' cricket, and each time I advised the entrepreneurs to meet the appropriate cricket board because they controlled the grounds. On each occasion, the administrators sent the entrepreneurs packing and it quickly became clear they weren't interested in a better deal for the players. That's why I say the players didn't stab the ACB in the back. The administrators had numerous opportunities to reach a compromise but displayed little interest in the welfare of the players. It wasn't really surprising then that more than 50 players from around the world signed lucrative WSC contracts and a revolution was born. About half of the WSC players were from Australia and this high ratio can, in part, be attributed to Bradman's tight-fisted approach to the ACB's money.

In WSC's debut season of 1977–78, Chappell hit the first Supertest century and finished fifth in overall averages. The prevalence of short-pitched fast bowling and a serious injury to Australian David Hookes led to the innovation of batting helmets; Chappell was one of the many batsmen to use one. Following their 1975–76 tour of Australia, the West Indies adopted a four-man fast bowling attack, while the World XI contained fast bowlers of the calibre of Imran Khan, Mike Procter, Garth Le Roux, Clive Rice and Sarfraz Nawaz. The constant diet of pace bowling undermined the confidence of some batsmen during WSC. Chappell's form fell away during the second season and he scored only 181 runs at 25.85 in four Supertests. During the last six days of the season, the WSC Australians lost the finals of both the limited-overs competition (to the West Indies XI) and the Supertest series (to the World XI), thus forfeiting the winner-takes-all prize money. After the latter match, Chappell vented his frustrations on World XI captain Tony Greig by refusing to shake his hand and criticising Greig's inconsequential contribution to his team's victory. The final act of the competition was a series between the WSC Australians and the WSC West Indies played in the Caribbean in the spring of 1979. After the Australians suffered a heavy defeat in the first Supertest at Jamaica, Chappell rallied his team to draw the five match series one-all. His best effort were scores of 61 and 86 at Barbados.

=== Return to Tests ===
Convinced to return to official cricket when WSC ended, Chappell resumed as captain of SA in 1979–80, a decision he later regretted. It was a season too far for the increasingly irascible Chappell. Reported by an umpire for swearing in a match against Tasmania, he received a three-week suspension. In his first match after the ban, he was again reported for his conduct in a game against the touring English team. Given a suspended ban by the ACB, he was then selected for Australia's last three Tests of the season. His Test career finished with scores of 75 and 26 not out at the MCG against England in February 1980. In his final first-class match, SA needed to beat Victoria to win the Sheffield Shield. Although Chappell scored 112, SA lost the match and the shield. Ironically, the umpires voted him the competition's player of the season for a second time.

=== ODI record ===
Chappell's aggressive approach suited limited-overs cricket; he scored his runs at a strike-rate of 77 runs per hundred balls. The timing of his career limited him to 16 ODI matches, but he appeared in a number of historic fixtures such as the first ODI (at the MCG in 1971), the first World Cup final (at Lord's in 1975) and the first day/night match (during WSC, at VFL Park in 1978). He passed fifty in half of his innings with a top score of 86 at Christchurch in 1973–74. In his final season of international cricket, he scored 63 not out (from 65 balls) against the West Indies at the SCG to win the player of the match award; five days later he hit an unbeaten 60 from 50 balls in his penultimate ODI appearance, against England. As captain, he recorded six wins and five losses from 11 matches. He is also credited to have hit the first ever six in an ODI match (which is in fact the first ODI match ever played).

=== Captaincy statistics ===
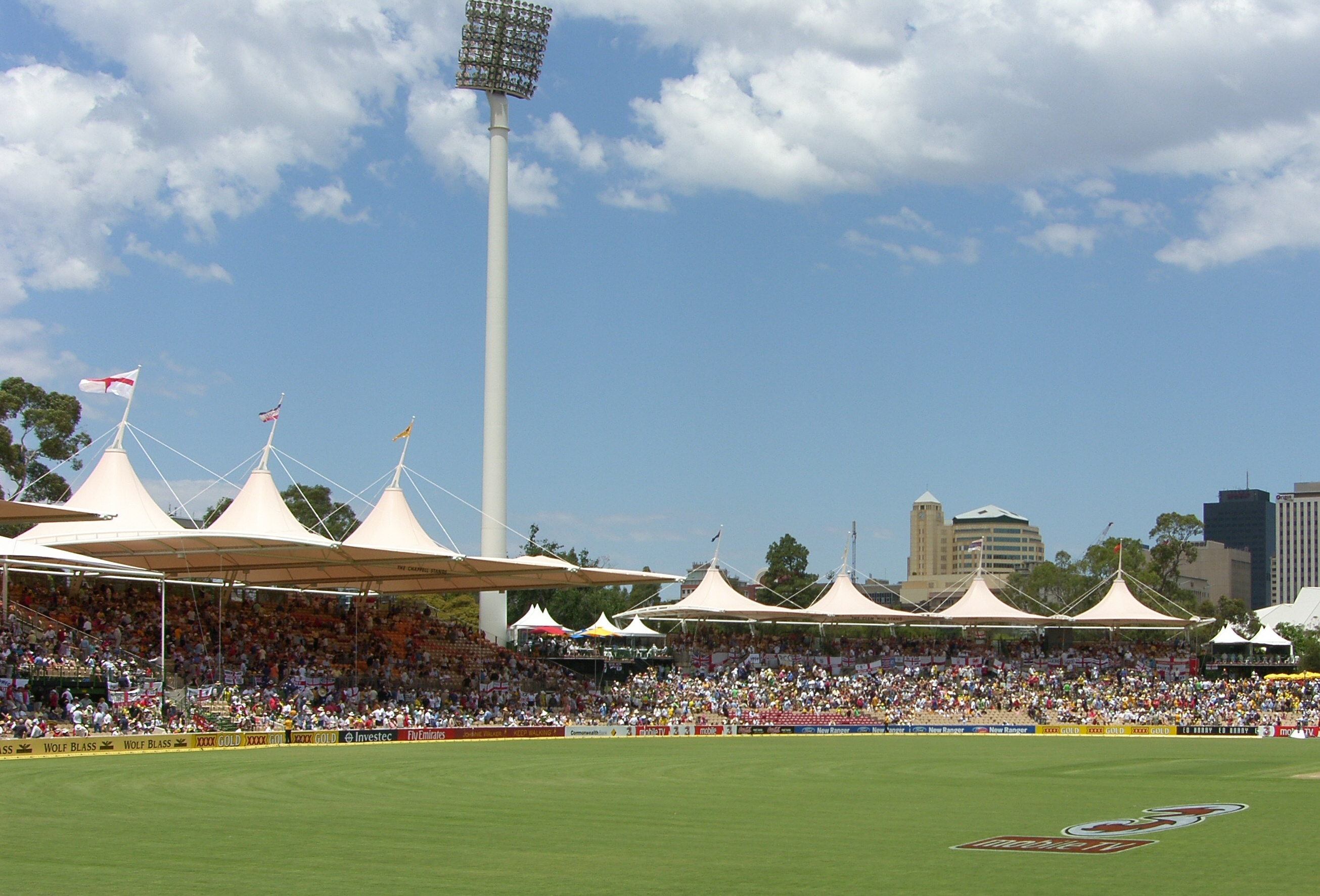
The Chappell Stands at the Adelaide Oval, opened in 2003

Season	Opponent	Played	Won	Lost	Drawn
1970-1	England (home)	1	0	1	0
1972	England (away)	5	2	2	1
1972–73	Pakistan (home)	3	3	0	0
1972–73	West Indies (away)	5	2	0	3
1973–74	New Zealand (home)	3	2	0	1
1973–74	New Zealand (away)	3	1	1	1
1974–75	England (home)	6	4	1	1
1975	England (away)	4	1	0	3
	Official Tests	30	15	5	10
1971–72	Rest of World XI (home)	5	1	2	2
1977–78	WSC Supertests (home)	5	1	4	0
1978–79	WSC Supertests (home)	4	1	2	1
1979	WSC Supertests (West Indies)	5	1	1	3
	All Matches	49	19	14	16

=== Legacy ===
The title of the ABC's documentary The Chappell Era, broadcast in 2002, encapsulated Chappell's significance to Australian cricket. Subtitled Cricket in the '70s, it chronicled the rise of the Australian cricket team under Chappell, the fight for better pay for the players, and professionalisation of the game through WSC. During the program, Chappell reiterated his criticisms of cricket's administration at the time.

In Wisden, Richie Benaud wrote, "Chappell will be remembered as much for his bid to improve the players' lot as he will for his run-getting and captaincy". During the WSC period, he founded a players' association with a loan provided by Kerry Packer. Despite Chappell's continued support for the organisation after his retirement, apathy and a lack of recognition from the ACB led to its demise in 1988. Revived in 1997 as the Australian Cricketers' Association (ACA), it is now an important organisation within the structure of Australian cricket. In 2005, Chappell became a member of the ACA executive.

Chappell was inducted into the Sport Australia Hall of Fame in 1986, the FICA Cricket Hall of Fame in 2000 and the Australian Cricket Hall of Fame in 2003. Two new grandstands at the Adelaide Oval were named the Chappell Stands; at the dedication ceremony in 2003, the SACA president Ian McLachlan called the Chappells, "the most famous cricketing family in South Australia". In 2004, the Chappell family was again honoured with the creation of the Chappell–Hadlee Trophy, an annual series of ODI matches played between Australia and New Zealand.

Chappell is the leading advocate for greater formal recognition of the first Australian sporting team to travel overseas, the Australian Aboriginal cricket team in England in 1868.

== Feud with Ian Botham ==
Chappell has a well-known feud with Ian Botham. It started over an incident in 1977 and continues to this day. The pair were assigned to commentate together in 1998 and did not exchange a word. In 2023, the pair were brought together for a TV special and it only seemed to make matters worse and reignite the feud.

== Media career ==
Following the path of his grandfather Vic Richardson, who was a radio commentator for many years, Chappell entered the media in 1973 by writing magazine articles and a column for The Age. He did television commentary for the 0–10 Network and the BBC before playing WSC. During the 1980s, Chappell spent eight years co-hosting with Mike Gibson, Wide World of Sports, an innovative magazine-style program broadcast by Channel Nine on Saturday afternoons and co-hosted a sister show, Sports Sunday, for five years. Early in his stint on the former program, he swore without realising that he was live to air. A similar incident occurred during a live telecast of the 1993 Ashes series.

Chappell began working as a commentator for Channel Nine's cricket coverage in the 1980–81 season, a position he retained until the network lost the Australian home cricket rights to Channel 7 in April 2018.

Chappell became a radio commentator for the Macquarie Sports Radio in 2018. He later moved to ABC Radio before retiring in August 2022.

=== Leadership critiques ===
==== Greg Chappell ====
The greatest controversy of his first season was the Underarm Incident, which involved his two younger brothers in an ODI played between Australia and New Zealand at the Melbourne Cricket Ground. Chappell showed no fraternal bias and was vehement in his criticism of his brother Greg's tactic. He wrote in a newspaper column on the matter: "Fair dinkum, Greg, how much pride do you sacrifice to win $35,000?"

==== Kim Hughes ====
He supported the claims of Rod Marsh to the Australian captaincy over the incumbent, Kim Hughes, in the early 1980s. The constant campaign against Hughes destabilised his authority. Compounding the situation, the ACB compelled Hughes to be interviewed by Chappell on a regular basis. He also criticised Hughes's batting. "Hughes needs to score the runs when they are needed most. He is not doing this and his inconsistency is rubbing off on others... there is a not a lot of thought in his batting".

On the morning of the second test against the West Indies in 1984–85, Chappell asked Hughes "Three months ago, you claimed Australia possessed no Test-worthy legspinner. So what is Bob Holland doing in the team?" Hughes resigned as captain after that match. Following Hughes' resignation, Australian cricket went into turmoil and Chappell received a share of the blame for the outcome.

==== Allan Border & Bob Simpson ====
Chappell had a direct influence on Hughes' successor, Allan Border. Early in his captaincy tenure, Border was struggling with the burdens of the position so the ACB appointed Bob Simpson as team coach to assist. There was animosity between Chappell and Simpson prior to this and Chappell continue to deride the need for a coach. Simpson responded by writing that the peer influence of older players helping younger players fell away during the era when the Chappell brothers led the team, and he was redressing the problem.

Chappell believed that the Border-Simpson leadership was too defensive and that Simpson usurped too much of Border's control of the team; Border heeded Chappell's assessment and adopted a more aggressive on-field approach later in his career and became known as "Captain Grumpy" to his teammates. Mark Taylor, who captained the team after Border, moved to dilute Simpson's authority. Chappell remains a long-standing critic of the use of coaches by national teams.

==== Steve Waugh ====
Ian Chappell was often critical of Steve Waugh as captain, believing him to be a selfish player and unimaginative captain. When Waugh was appointed captain in 1999 Chappell said:

I think he's been a selfish cricketer . . . I've always felt that the things you do as a player leading up to getting the captaincy do have an effect [on] how players perceive you. I've had the feeling that a selfish player when he becomes captain . . . gets a little less out of his players than someone who is not selfish.

Chappell felt Shane Warne should have been picked as captain instead and his criticism of Waugh's captaincy did not abate during Waugh's stint in that role, despite his success. Waugh later wrote of Chappell:

Ian Chappell ... always sweated on my blunders and reported them with an 'I told you so' mentality ... To say Chappell's criticism irked me would be an understatement, though I knew that, like anyone, he was entitled to an opinion. I don't mind the fact he criticised me — in fact, I would much rather someone make a judgement than not, but I have always felt that a critic must be either constructive or base his comments on fact ... It was something I had to live with, and when I realised he was never going to cut me much slack, I decided anything he said that was positive would be a bonus and the rest just cast aside.

Chappell rated Ricky Ponting a better captain than Waugh.

=== Player critiques ===
Chappell has been a vocal critic of a number of Australian players, most recently Ed Cowan and George Bailey.

=== Books and writings ===
Chappell's first book was an account of the 1972 Ashes tour, Tigers Among the Lions, followed by a series of books of cricketing humour and anecdotes published in the early 1980s. The more analytical The Cutting Edge, an appraisal of modern cricket, appeared in 1992. Ashley Mallett's biography, Chappelli Speaks Out (published in the UK as Hitting Out – the Ian Chappell Story) was written in collaboration with Chappell and released in 2005. It caused controversy due to Chappell's assessment of Steve Waugh, who he described as "selfish" and as a captain, "ran out of ideas very quickly". In 2006, Chappell released an anthology of his cricket writings entitled A Golden Age. He is a regular contributor for Cricinfo.

== Personal life ==
After leaving school, Chappell spent two years as a clerk in a sharebroker's office, which he left to play league cricket in England. He then worked as a promotions representative for Nestlé and, later, the cigarette manufacturer WD & HO Wills. After eight years with Wills, Chappell capitalised on his fame as Australian captain by forming his own company specialising in advertising, promotion and journalism, which has remained his profession. He is twice married, and has a daughter (Amanda) with his first wife Kay. Chappell now lives in Sydney with his second wife Barbara-Ann. In recent years, Chappell has been a high-profile activist for better treatment of asylum seekers by the Australian government, in particular its policy of mandatory detention. He supports Australia cutting ties with the United Kingdom and becoming a republic, being a founding member of the Australian Republic Movement.

In July 2019, Chappell announced that he had been undergoing radiotherapy for skin cancer.
