= West Indian cricket team in South Africa in 1983–84 =

International cricket tour

	South Africa	West Indies
- Dates: 19 November 1983 – 31 January 1984
Captains	Peter Kirsten (until 10 January 1984); Clive Rice (From 13 January 1984)	Lawrence Rowe

Test series
- Result: West Indies won the 4-match series 2–1

One Day International series
- Results: West Indies won the 6-match series 4–2

In late 1983 and early 1984, a representative team of West Indian cricket players undertook a so-called "Rebel tour" to South Africa to play a series of matches against the South African team. At the time, the International Cricket Council (ICC) had placed a moratorium on international cricket teams making tours of South Africa, due to the nation's government policy of apartheid, leaving South Africa with no official international competition.

== Background ==
The previous season another West Indian tour had taken place. It was a financial success with quality competitive matches throughout, the test series being drawn 1-1 and the Springboks won the ODI series 4–2. Consequently, a second series was organised to replicate the successes of the first.

== Touring team ==
Player	Date of birth	Batting style	Bowling style	First class team
Lawrence Rowe (c)	8 January 1949	Right hand	Left arm fast medium	Jamaica
Hartley Alleyne	28 February 1957	Right-hand	Right-arm fast	Barbados
Faoud Bacchus	31 January 1954	Right-hand	Right-arm medium	Guyana
Sylvester Clarke	11 December 1954	Right-hand	Right-arm fast	Barbados
Colin Croft	15 March 1953	Right-hand	Right-arm fast	Guyana
Alvin Greenidge	20 August 1956	Right-hand	Right-arm medium	Barbados
Bernard Julien	13 March 1950	Right hand	Left arm medium-fast	Trinidad and Tobago
Alvin Kallicharran	21 March 1949	Left-hand	Right-arm offbreak	Guyana
Collis King	11 June 1951	Right-hand	Right-arm medium	Barbados
Monte Lynch	21 May 1958	Right-hand	Right-arm medium	Guyana
Everton Mattis	11 April 1957	Right-hand	Right-arm offbreak	Jamaica
Ezra Moseley	5 January 1958	Right-hand	Right-arm medium-fast	Barbados
David Murray	29 May 1950	Right-hand	wicket-keeper	Barbados
Albert Padmore	17 December 1944	Right-hand	Right-arm offbreak	Barbados
Derick Parry	22 December 1954	Right-hand	Right-arm offbreak	Leeward Islands
Franklyn Stephenson	8 April 1959	Right-hand	Right-arm fast	Barbados
Emmerson Trotman	10 November 1954	Right-hand	Right-arm medium	Barbados

== Tour matches ==
19–22 November 1983
(3-day match)
Scorecard

Northern Transvaal	v	West Indies
288/9d (77 overs); Lee Barnard 60; Colin Croft 4/41 (13 overs)		153 (40.2 overs); Everton Mattis 35; Francois Weideman 4/35 (12 overs)
136/5d (49 overs); Noel Day 41; Colin Croft 2/20 (13 overs)		183/5 (51 overs); Alvin Kallicharran 92; Eugene Klopper 1/20 (11 overs)

Match drawn
Berea Park, Pretoria
Umpires: George Baker and George Hawkins

- Northern Transvaal elected to bat

25–28 November 1983
(3-day match)
Scorecard

West Indies	v	Western Province
291 (73 overs); Monte Lynch 105; Denys Hobson 5/92 (23 overs)		322/8d (91 overs); Peter Kirsten 71; Sylvester Clarke 3/87 (27 overs)
300 (72.3 overs); Collis King 75; Denys Hobson 7/129 (32 overs)		57/1 (20 overs); Graham Gooch 28; Franklyn Stephenson 1/24 (7 overs)

Match drawn
Newlands, Cape Town
Umpires: Bernard Glass and Taffy Rossiter

- West Indies elected to bat

2–4 December 1983
(3-day match)
Scorecard

West Indies	v	Natal
397 (92.4 overs); Faoud Bacchus 88; Michael Clare 4/68 (16.4 overs)		239 (69 overs); Mike Procter 102; Ezra Moseley 4/36 (19 overs)
168/9d (28.4 overs); Alvin Kallicharran 79; Brett Proctor 3/29 (5.4 overs)		160/3 (41 overs); Robert Bentley 65; Ezra Moseley 2/23 (9 overs)

Match drawn
Kingsmead, Durban
Umpires: Denzil Bezuidenhout and Karl Liebenberg

- West Indies elected to bat

First ODI

7 December 1983
Scorecard

South Africa; 233/7 (50 overs)	v	West Indies; 235/8 (49.2 overs)
Peter Kirsten 55 (82); Colin Croft 3/48 (10 overs)		Alvin Kallicharran 80 (98); Garth Le Roux 3/39 (10 overs)

West Indies won by 2 wickets
Wanderers Stadium, Johannesburg
Umpires: Cyril Mitchley and Oswald Schoof
Player of the match: Alvin Kallicharran (WI)

- West Indies elected to field

12–15 December 1983
(3-day match)
Scorecard

Eastern Province	v	West Indies
314 (118 overs); David Emslie 60; Collis King 3/30 (7 overs)		242/7d (62 overs); Emmerson Trotman 96; Kenny Watson 4/70 (17 overs)
161 (56.1 overs); David Emslie 50*; Hartley Alleyne 4/26 (12 overs)		181/7 (49 overs); Collis King 35*; Michael van Vuuren 3/74 (16 overs)

Match drawn
St George's Park Cricket Ground, Port Elizabeth
Umpires: Carl Coetzee and Louis Rautenbach

- West Indies elected to bat

17–19 December 1983
(3-day match)
Scorecard

West Indies	v	Transvaal
230 (67.2 overs); Everton Mattis 51; Cyril Mitchley 6/53 (14.2 overs)		310/9d (82.4 overs); Kevin McKenzie 84; Sylvester Clarke 2/45 (21 overs)
172 (64.2 overs); Monte Lynch 37; Alan Kourie 4/58 (24 overs)		94/6 (23.1 overs); Clive Rice 36*; Sylvester Clarke 3/38 (12 overs)

Transvaal won by 4 wickets
Wanderers Stadium, Johannesburg
Umpires: Arthur Norton and James Peacock

- West Indies elected to bat

First Test

23–27 December 1983
(4-day match)
Scorecard

West Indies	v	South Africa
529/7d (135 overs); Lawrence Rowe 157 (321); Garth Le Roux 3/88 (27 overs)		333 (106.1 overs); Peter Kirsten 84 (195); Sylvester Clarke 5/105 (32.1 overs)
		59/0 (24 overs); Jimmy Cook 30 (67)

Match drawn
Kingsmead, Durban
Umpires: Denzil Bezuidenhout and Dudley Schoof

- West Indies elected to bat

Second Test

30 December 1983-3 January 1984
(4-day match)
Scorecard

West Indies	v	South Africa
252 (87.4 overs); Collis King 83 (136); Alan Kourie 5/66 (22 overs)		404 (132.5 overs); Graeme Pollock 102 (135); Sylvester Clarke 5/92 (37.5 overs)
268 (96.3 overs); Derick Parry 58 (135); Alan Kourie 3/61 (27 overs)		117/0 (21.2 overs); Henry Fotheringham 71* (83)

South Africa won by 10 wickets
Newlands, Cape Town
Umpires: Cyril Mitchley and Sydney Moore
Player of the match: Alan Kourie (SA)

- West Indies elected to bat
- 1 January was a rest day

Second ODI

6 January 1984
Scorecard

West Indies; 260/8 (50 overs)	v	South Africa; 261/6 (44.4 overs)
Ezra Moseley 63* (48); Stephen Jefferies 4/79 (10 overs)		Henry Fotheringham 78 (97); Hartley Alleyne 2/26 (7 overs)

South Africa won by 4 wickets
St George's Park Cricket Ground, Port Elizabeth
Umpires: Dudley Schoof and Perry Hurwitz
Player of the match: Henry Fotheringham (SA)

- South Africa elected to field

Third ODI

8 January 1984
Scorecard

South Africa; 220 (49.5 overs)	v	West Indies; 194/4 (40 overs)
Ken McEwan 50 (61); Ezra Moseley 4/53 (9.5 overs)		Lawrence Rowe 45*; Clive Rice 2/31 (7 overs)

West Indies won by 6 wickets
Kingsmead, Durban
Umpires: Denzil Bezuidenhout and Oswald Schoof
Player of the match: Lawrence Rowe (WI)

- West Indies elected to field
- West Indies target was revised to 194 runs in 44 overs

Fourth ODI

10 January 1984
Scorecard

South Africa; 149 (41.2 overs)	v	West Indies; 150/2 (39.5 overs)
Graeme Pollock 45 (80); Ezra Moseley 4/38 (10 overs)		Emmerson Trotman 94 (132); Alan Kourie 1/24 (10 overs)

West Indies won by 8 wickets
Newlands, Cape Town
Umpires: Herbert Martin and Perry Hurwitz
Player of the match: Ezra Moseley (WI)

- West Indies elected to field

Third Test

13–17 January 1984
(4-day match)
Scorecard

South Africa	v	West Indies
160 (45.4 overs); Peter Kirsten 67 (96); Ezra Moseley 4/45 (10.4 overs)		193 (52.5 overs); Collis King 54 (50); Adrian Kuiper 5/50 (11.5 overs)
236 (56.3 overs); Peter Kirsten 61 (73); Hartley Alleyne 5/62 (14 overs)		205/9 (53.2 overs); Alvin Greenidge 43 (57); Kenny Watson 4/63 (16.2 overs)

West Indies won by 1 wicket
Wanderers Stadium, Johannesburg
Umpires: Dudley Schoof and Sydney Moore
Player of the match: Hartley Alleyne (WI)

- South Africa elected to bat

Fifth ODI

21 January 1984
Scorecard

South Africa; 279/3 (50 overs)	v	West Indies; 208/7 (34.2 overs)
Mandy Yachad 123 (159); Sylvester Clarke 1/43 (10 overs)		Lawrence Rowe 87 (69); Rupert Hanley 2/37 (10 overs)

West Indies won by 3 wickets
Wanderers Stadium, Johannesburg
Umpires: Cyril Mitchley and Denzil Bezuidenhout

- West Indies elected to field
- West Indies target was revised 207 runs in 37 overs

Sixth ODI

23 January 1984
Scorecard

South Africa; 227/7 (50 overs)	v	West Indies; 54 (20.1 overs)
Clive Rice 54 (87); Sylvester Clarke 3/31 (10 overs)		Lawrence Rowe 12 (21); Rupert Hanley 6/22 (10 overs)

South Africa won by 173 runs
Berea Park, Pretoria
Umpires: Dudley Schoof and Sydney Moore
Player of the match: Rupert Hanley (SA)

- West Indies elected to field

Fourth Test

27–31 January 1984
(4-day match)
Scorecard

South Africa	v	West Indies
277 (82 overs); Ken McEwan 120 (151); Sylvester Clarke 5/36 (23 overs)		199 (81 overs); Faoud Bacchus 66 (186); Kenny Watson 3/46 (24 overs)
127 (46.4 overs); Graeme Pollock 42 (66); Sylvester Clarke 5/32 (13.4 overs)		206/4 (49 overs); Emmerson Trotman 77 (118); Peter Kirsten 1/17 (6 overs)

West Indies won by 6 wickets
St George's Park Cricket Ground, Port Elizabeth
Umpires: Cyril Mitchley and Herbert Martin
Player of the match: Sylvester Clarke (WI)

- South Africa elected to bat
