= West Indian cricket team in South Africa in 1982–83 =

International cricket tour

	South Africa	West Indies
- Dates: 15 January 1983 – 13 February 1983
Captains	Peter Kirsten	Lawrence Rowe

Test series
- Result: 2-match series drawn 1–1

One Day International series
- Results: South Africa won the 6-match series 4–2

In January and February 1983, a representative team of West Indian cricket players undertook a so-called "Rebel tour" to South Africa, to play a series of matches against the South African team. At the time, the International Cricket Council (ICC) had placed a moratorium on international cricket teams making tours of South Africa, due to the nation's government policy of apartheid, leaving South Africa with no official international competition.

== Background ==
The West Indian players were mainly talented understudies struggling to break into the great West Indian Test team of the period, or men past their prime as Test players. First-class cricketers in the West Indies were then poorly paid and the participants, many of whom had irregular or no employment in the off-season, received between US$100,000 and US$125,000 for the two tours. West Indies cricket was so strong that Clive Lloyd had little need for the likes of Lawrence Rowe, Collis King and Sylvester Clarke. Rowe has since stated that he and several other players were disillusioned with the West Indies Cricket Board for not selecting them despite good performances.

The previous season a Sri Lankan team toured South Africa which was theorised to have helped pave the way for players from the West Indies to tour by demonstrating it possible for a non-white cricket team to tour South Africa safely.

The strength of Caribbean cricket was evidenced in the 'international' matches, where South Africa received their first real test. A fiercely contested four-week series in 1982–3 took 'unofficial internationals' to new heights, the Springboks winning the one-day series 4–2 while the 'Test' series was drawn 1–1. The dominant theme of the match-ups was West Indian fast bowling. Colin Croft was one of four World Cup winners in the party. Their pace battery, featuring Clarke, Croft, Stephenson, Bernard Julien and Ezra Moseley, the Springbok batsmen wore helmets for the first time. The frantic first series, organised in secret and conducted on the hoof, set up a fierce battle when the West Indians returned for a full tour the following season.

== Touring team ==
Player	Date of birth	Batting style	Bowling style	First class team
Lawrence Rowe (c)	8 January 1949	Right hand	Left arm fast medium	Jamaica
Richard Austin	5 September 1954	Right hand	Right-arm medium/off break	Jamaica
Herbert Chang	2 July 1952	Left-hand	Right-arm medium	Jamaica
Sylvester Clarke	11 December 1954	Right-hand	Right-arm fast	Barbados
Colin Croft	15 March 1953	Right-hand	Right-arm fast	Guyana
Alvin Greenidge	20 August 1956	Right-hand	Right-arm medium	Barbados
Bernard Julien	13 March 1950	Right hand	Left arm medium-fast	Trinidad and Tobago
Alvin Kallicharran	21 March 1949	Left-hand	Right-arm offbreak	Guyana
Collis King	11 June 1951	Right-hand	Right-arm medium	Barbados
Everton Mattis	11 April 1957	Right-hand	Right-arm offbreak	Jamaica
Ezra Moseley	5 January 1958	Right-hand	Right-arm medium-fast	Barbados
David Murray	29 May 1950	Right-hand	wicket-keeper	Barbados
Albert Padmore	17 December 1944	Right-hand	Right-arm offbreak	Barbados
Derick Parry	22 December 1954	Right-hand	Right-arm offbreak	Leeward Islands
Franklyn Stephenson	8 April 1959	Right-hand	Right-arm fast	Barbados
Emmerson Trotman	10 November 1954	Right-hand	Right-arm medium	Barbados
Ray Wynter	27 November 1955	Right-hand	Right-arm medium-fast	Jamaica

== Tour matches ==
15 January 1983
Scorecard

West Indies; 204/9 (50 overs)	v	Western Province; 183 (49.4 overs)
Collis King 79*; Stephen Jefferies 4/31 (10 overs)		Graham Gooch 64; Ezra Moseley 4/23 (9.4 overs)

West Indies won by 21 runs
Newlands, Cape Town
Umpires: Albert Maasch and Herbert Martin
Player of the match: Collis King (WI)

- Western Province won the toss and decided to field

15 January 1983
Scorecard

Border; 100/8 (50 overs)	v	West Indies; 103/3 (23 overs)
Raymond Ranger 23; Sylvester Clarke 2/18 (7 overs)		Collis King 57*; Dirk Scott 2/32 (7 overs)

West Indies won by 7 wickets
Jan Smuts Ground, East London
Umpires: Oswald Schoof and Dudley Schoof

- Toss not known

19 January 1983
Scorecard

West Indies; 243 (49.2 overs)	v	Eastern Province; 158 (44.2 overs)
Collis King 71; James Carse 4/31 (9.2 overs)		Robert Armitage 58; Franklyn Stephenson 5/20 (7.2 overs)

West Indies won by 85 runs
St George's Park, Port Elizabeth
Umpires: Sandy Matthews and Timothy Pole
Player of the match: Franklyn Stephenson (WI)

- Toss not known

First Test

21–25 January 1983
(4-day match)
Scorecard

South Africa	v	West Indies
449 (132.4 overs); Graeme Pollock 100; Derick Parry 5/117 (43 overs)		246 (75 overs); Richard Austin 93; Vintcent van der Bijl 4/44 (20 overs)
108/5 (30 overs); Graeme Pollock 43*; Sylvester Clarke 2/22 (15 overs)		309 (122.4 overs) f/o Alvin Kallicharran 89; Stephen Jefferies 4/58 (35.4 overs)

South Africa won by 5 wickets
Newlands, Cape Town
Umpires: Barry Smith and Oswald Schoof

- South Africa won the toss and elected to bat
- 23 January was a rest day

Second Test

28 January-1 February 1983
(4-day match)
Scorecard

West Indies	v	South Africa
267 (78 overs); Collis King 101; Alan Kourie 6/55 (29 overs)		233 (78.3 overs); Graeme Pollock 73; Sylvester Clarke 5/66 (23.3 overs)
176 (62.1 overs); Alvin Greenidge 48; Garth Le Roux 3/46 (15.1 overs)		181 (71.2 overs); Barry Richards 59; Sylvester Clarke 7/34 (22.2 overs)

West Indies won by 29 runs
New Wanderers Stadium, Johannesburg
Umpires: Cyril Mitchley and Dudley Schoof

- South Africa won the toss and decided to field
- 30 January was a rest day

3 February 1983
Scorecard

Natal; 202/8 (50 overs)	v	West Indies; 118 (38.3 overs)
Barry Richards 54; Franklyn Stephenson 4/46 (9 overs)		Colin Croft 33; Kenneth Cooper 3/26 (6 overs)

Natal won by 84 runs
Kingsmead, Durban
Umpires: Denzil Bezuidenhout and Karl Liebenberg

- Toss not known

First ODI

5 February 1983
Scorecard

South Africa; 250/7 (50 overs)	v	West Indies; 159 (44.3 overs)
Barry Richards 102; Ezra Moseley 2/43 (10 overs)		Alvin Greenidge 32; Alan Kourie 3/24 (10 overs)

South Africa won by 91 runs
St George's Park, Port Elizabeth
Umpires: Desmond Sansom and Dudley Schoof

- South Africa won the toss and decided to bat

Second ODI

7 February 1983
Scorecard

South Africa; 194/8 (50 overs)	v	West Indies; 151 (40.4 overs)
Ken McEwan 61; Bernard Julien 3/17 (10 overs)		Emmerson Trotman 46; Stephen Jefferies 3/21 (10 overs)

South Africa won by 43 runs
Newlands, Cape Town
Umpires: Cyril Mitchley and Denzil Bezuidenhout

- South Africa won the toss and decided to bat

Third ODI

9 February 1983
Scorecard

South Africa; 179/9 (50 overs)	v	West Indies; 167 (47 overs)
Ken McEwan 38; Ezra Moseley 4/27 (10 overs)		Franklyn Stephenson 35; Vintcent van der Bijl 3/21 (8 overs)

South Africa won by 12 runs
Berea Park, Pretoria
Umpires: Cyril Mitchley and Dudley Schoof

- South Africa won the toss and decided to bat

Fourth ODI

11 February 1983 (D/N)
Scorecard

South Africa; 139 (42.1 overs)	v	West Indies; 141/3 (37.4 overs)
Graeme Pollock 23; Franklyn Stephenson 3/30 (7.1 overs)		Lawrence Rowe 32*; Stephen Jefferies 2/22 (10 overs)

West Indies won by 7 wickets
New Wanderers Stadium, Johannesburg
Umpires: Oswald Schoof and Sydney Moore

- Toss not known

Fifth ODI

12 February 1983
Scorecard

South Africa; 228/6 (50 overs)	v	West Indies; 171 (41.3 overs)
Robert Armitage 46; Derick Parry 2/38 (10 overs)		Lawrence Rowe 71; Rupert Hanley 4/25 (10 overs)

South Africa won by 57 runs
New Wanderers Stadium, Johannesburg
Umpires: Cyril Mitchley and Oswald Schoof

- Toss not known
- Rupert Hanley took a hat-trick in the West Indies innings (Rowe, Parry, Clarke)

Sixth ODI

13 February 1983
Scorecard

West Indies; 155 (36.5 overs)	v	South Africa; 71 (25.5 overs)
Collis King 60; Stephen Jefferies 3/21 (9 overs)		Jimmy Cook 29; Franklyn Stephenson 6/9 (6.5 overs)

West Indies won by 84 runs
Kingsmead, Durban
Umpires: Denzil Bezuidenhout and Dudley Schoof

- West Indies won the toss and decided to bat

CEB Rice Benefit Match

15 February 1983
(45-over match)
Scorecard

West Indies; 254/9d (42 overs)	v	South Africa; 228 (40.4 overs)
Richard Austin 91; Rupert Hanley 3/48 (8 overs)		Graeme Pollock 62; Alvin Kallicharran 3/69 (9 overs)

West Indies won by 26 runs
Rovers Cricket Club, Welkom

- Toss not known
- Rowe declared because David Murray could not find his cricket trousers in time to bat

== Aftermath ==
The West Indian players were given life bans in all forms of the game, depriving West Indian cricket of a large amount of player talent. Despite earning much money from the tour many West Indian players faced social stigma and unemployment afterwards with nine leaving the Caribbean altogether as a result. Though the ban was lifted in 1989 only one of the players, Ezra Moseley, was selected to play for the West Indies post 1989.
