= Australian World Series Cricket team in the West Indies in 1979 =

Australia in the West Indies
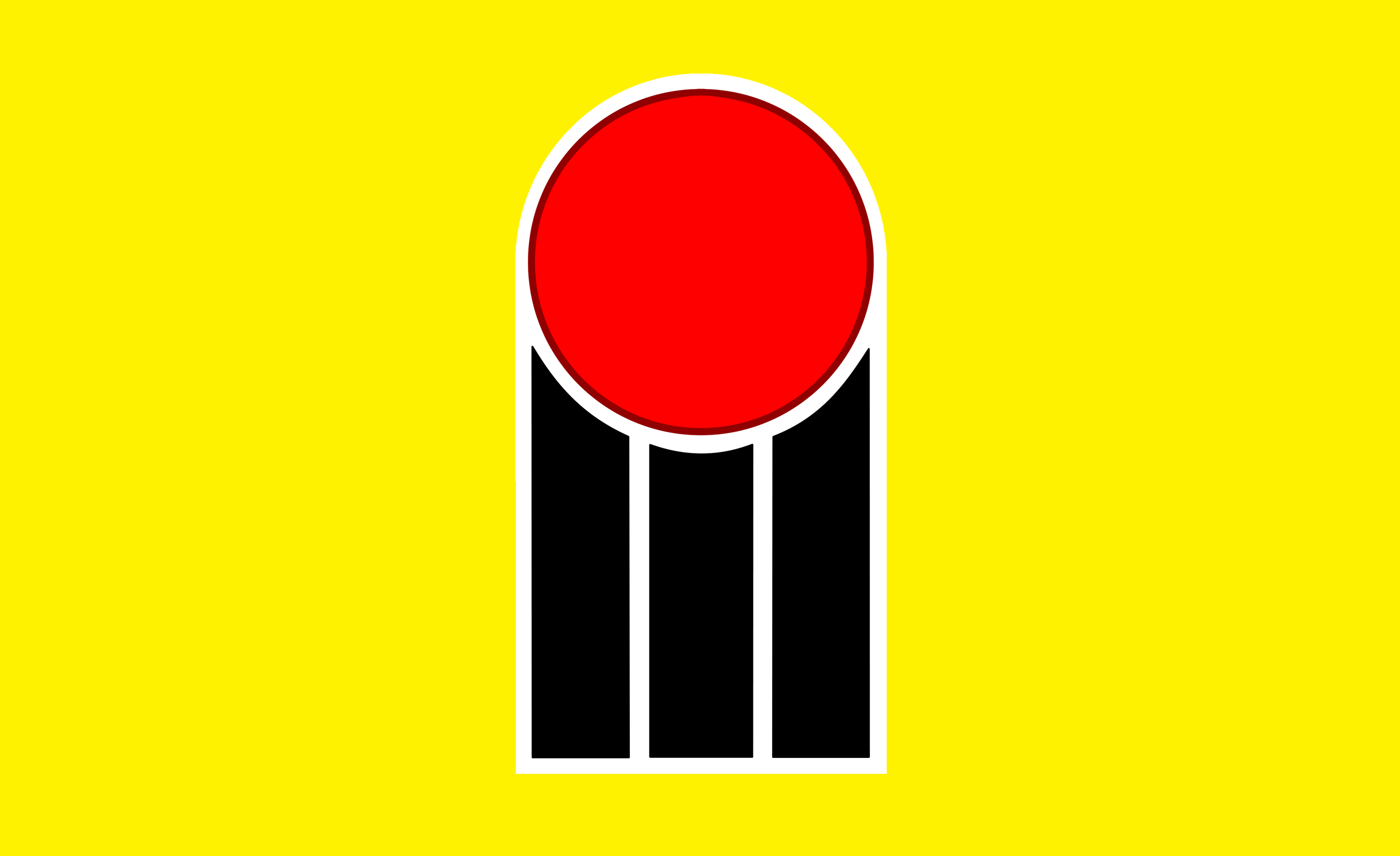
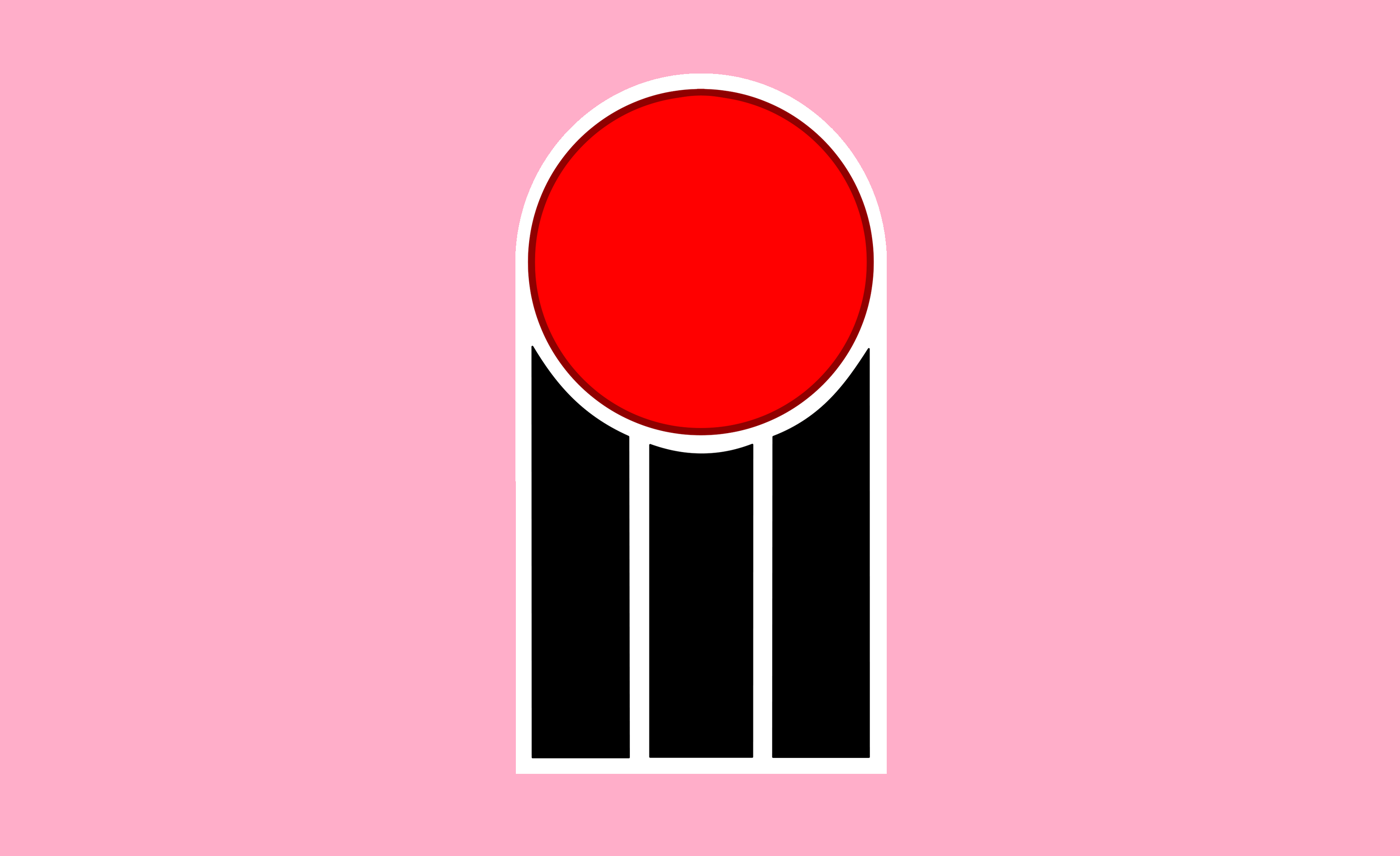
	Australia	West Indies
- Dates: 20 February 1979 – 13 April 1979
Captains	Ian Chappell	Clive Lloyd

Test series
- Result: 5-match series drawn 1–1
Most runs	Greg Chappell (620)	Roy Fredericks (363)
Most wickets	Dennis Lillee (23)	Michael Holding (24)

One Day International series
- Results: West Indies won the 12-match series 8–2
Most runs	Martin Kent (278)	Gordon Greenidge (304)
Most wickets	Jeff Thomson (13)	Colin Croft (16)

The World Series Cricket tour of the West Indies took place between February and April 1979. It was the second tour event of World Series Cricket after the World XI New Zealand tour earlier in the season. It was the first tour to feature the West Indies and WSC Supertests. The five match Supertest series was drawn 1–1. It ran in parallel with the ODI series which the West Indies won easily, 8–2.

== Squads ==
Note: Number of Supertests and One-Day matches in brackets

West Indies
Clive Lloyd (c) (5/7)	Richard Austin (2/9)
Colin Croft (5/7)	Wayne Daniel (2/8)
Roy Fredericks (5/9)	Joel Garner (1/8)
Gordon Greenidge (4/7)	Desmond Haynes (3/9)
Michael Holding (5/6)	Collis King (3/6)
Deryck Murray (wk) (5/9)	Albert Padmore (2/4)
Viv Richards (5/8)	Andy Roberts (4/6)
Lawrence Rowe (4/7)

Australia
Ian Chappell (c) (5/8)	Ray Bright (5/5)
Greg Chappell (5/9)	Trevor Chappell (4/7)
Gus Gilmour (1/7)	David Hookes (5/9)
Martin Kent (5/10)	Bruce Laird (5/9)
Dennis Lillee (5/6)	Rick McCosker (1/6)
Mick Malone (0/6)	Rod Marsh (wk) (5/9)
Len Pascoe (4/7)	Richie Robinson (0/2)
Jeff Thomson (5/6)	Max Walker (0/4)

== Itinerary ==
Compared to previous international tours to the West Indies the schedule of the WSC tour was rigorous. The previous year the official Australia side had conducted a tour of the West Indies that took in five Test matches, two ODIs and six tour matches in 75 days from 17 February to 3 May 1978. The WSC tour featured five Supertests and twelve ODIs in just 52 days from 20 February to 13 April. What made the tour so physically demanding were the back to back ODIs and constant travelling between Islands with only a day between fixtures. On top of the gruelling itinerary, the cricket was intense and of the highest standard, unlike traditional tours that feature matches against weak opposition.

Date	Fixture	Venue
20 February 1979	1st ODI	Sabina Park, Kingston, Jamaica
21 February 1979	2nd ODI	Sabina Park, Kingston, Jamaica
23 February 1979	1st Supertest	Sabina Park, Kingston, Jamaica
3 March 1979	3rd ODI	Mindoo Philip Park, Castries, St Lucia
4 March 1979	4th ODI	Mindoo Philip Park, Castries, St Lucia
6 March 1979	5th ODI	Kensington Oval, Bridgetown, Barbados
7 March 1979	6th ODI	Kensington Oval, Bridgetown, Barbados
9 March 1979	2nd Supertest	Kensington Oval, Bridgetown, Barbados
16 March 1979	3rd Supertest	Queen's Park Oval, Port of Spain, Trinidad and Tobago
25 March 1979	4th Supertest	Bourda, Georgetown, Guyana
29 March 1979	7th ODI	Albion Sports Complex, Berbice, Guyana
31 March 1979	8th ODI	Queen's Park Oval, Port of Spain, Trinidad and Tobago
1 April 1979	9th ODI	Queen's Park Oval, Port of Spain, Trinidad and Tobago
2 April 1979	10th ODI	Queen's Park Oval, Port of Spain, Trinidad and Tobago
4 April 1979	11th ODI	Windsor Park, Roseau, Dominica
6 April 1979	5th Supertest	Antigua Recreation Ground, St John's, Antigua and Barbuda
13 April 1979	12th ODI	Warner Park, Basseterre, St Kitts

== Supertests ==
=== 1st Supertest ===
23–26 February 1979 (5 Day Match)
scorecard

West Indies	v	Australia
188 (56.2 overs); Clive Lloyd 56; Dennis Lillee 4/68 (18.2)		106 (37 overs); David Hookes 23; Wayne Daniel 3/24 (7)
481 (109.4 overs); Clive Lloyd 197; Dennis Lillee 4/100 (25)		194 (51.4 overs); Ray Bright 47; Michael Holding 3/37 (10)

West Indies won by 369 runs
Sabina Park, Kingston, Jamaica
Umpires: Douglas Sang Hue & Ralph Gosein
Player of the match: Clive Lloyd

- West Indies won the toss and elected to bat

The Australian newspaper reported that never before had an Australian XI led by Ian Chappell been so humiliated in defeat. Australia had started well reducing the West Indies to 119–7. But Clive Lloyd as he had done so often before, resisted scoring a vital 56, aputting on 40 runs for the last wicket with the capable Wayne Daniel (17*). Chappell was delighted with his bowlers performance on a first day that closed with Australia 33/2, Ian out along with Bruce Laird and brother Trevor retired hurt. Twelve wickets would fall on the second day, Australia were bowled out for just 106, the four pronged West Indian attack making mince-meat of the Aussie batting card. With a lead of 76 the West Indies batted positively, compiling a total of 481 at a remarkable run rate of 4.39 runs per over. Clive Lloyd was again the star scoring a brilliant 197 before being the eighth batsman dismissed. Requiring an unlikely 558 runs to win in their second innings, the aggressive Ian Chappell chose to open the batting, protecting Trevor from the new ball. Ian made 41 but his side were only 83–4 at his dismissal and on the verge of a crushing defeat. Ray Bright made a good 47 not out, but the Australian tail were blown away by the four quicks, complemented by the medium pace of Richard Austin. The West Indies completed a 369 run win on the fourth day.

=== 2nd Supertest ===
9–13 March 1979 (5 Day Match)
scorecard

Australia	v	West Indies
311 (106.1 overs); Martin Kent 78; Michael Holding 4/67 (26.1)		239 (58 overs); Roy Fredericks 89; Dennis Lillee 3/56 (13)
294 (102.5 overs); Greg Chappell 90; Richard Austin 3/59 (24.5)		133/4 (29 overs); Roy Fredericks 53; Len Pascoe 3/20 (4)

Match Drawn
Kensington Oval, Bridgetown, Barbados
Umpires: Douglas Sang Hue & Ralph Gosein
Player of the match: Ian Chappell

- West Indies won the toss and elected to field

Play was suspended midway through Day 5 after the crowd threw bottles onto the ground. This was to protest against the umpire's decision to dismiss Roy Fredericks by leg before wicket. The match was abandoned at 2:30 pm and ended in a draw.

=== 3rd Supertest ===
16–20 March 1979 (5 Day Match)
scorecard

Australia	v	West Indies
246 (100 overs); Bruce Laird 122; Michael Holding 5/48 (21)		230 (69.4 overs); Andy Roberts 50*; Jeff Thomson 5/78 (20)
282 (144.4 overs); Greg Chappell 150; Albert Padmore 6/81 (54.4)		274 (89.5 overs); Roy Fredericks 72; Ian Chappell 3/35 (10)

Australia won by 24 runs
Queen's Park Oval, Port of Spain, Trinidad and Tobago
Umpires: Douglas Sang Hue & Ralph Gosein
Player of the match: Greg Chappell

- Australia won the toss and elected to bat

=== 4th Supertest ===
25–28 March 1979 (5-day match)
scorecard

Australia	v	West Indies
341 (112.1 overs); Greg Chappell 113; Joel Garner 3/60 (26)		476 (113.1 overs); Collis King 110; Jeff Thomson 4/84 (25)
117/3 (33 overs); Trevor Chappell 28; Colin Croft 2/32 (8)

Match Drawn
Bourda, Georgetown, Guyana
Umpires: Douglas Sang Hue & Ralph Gosein
Player of the match: Collis King

- West Indies won the toss and elected to field
- No play on first and second day due to rain and riot

A result was never likely in the 4th Supertest at Bourda. When the Australians landed at Guyana they discovered it had been raining for days. On the scheduled first day play was abandoned before the players had even left for the ground. That evening the pitch was still underwater. On the second day the rain had stopped and it was hot and sunny. Yet the two captains, Chappell and Lloyd, decided the condition of the outfield was unfit for play, Greg Chappell describing it as a "quagmire". Unfortunately for the cricketers and officials at Bourda, thousands of spectators had been allowed into the ground that morning. Ian Chappell recalls how he was visited in the dressing rooms by the local chief of police and told, "If there is no play today, I am afraid to tell you that I can no longer guarantee your safety at the ground." The consensus was that there must, therefore, be some sort of play. The captains and umpires agreed to start play at 4 pm and play for roughly an hour until the light faded. However a misinformed PA announced to the crowd that play would begin at 3 pm. This enraged the volatile Chappell, who then reneged on the deal and refused to play. The crowd, many of whom had been drinking rum and partying all day, sensed no play and began a riot. Both teams and the officials were locked in their dressing rooms. The Australians donned their new batting helmets and took guard with their bats, behind the bolted door. The rioters attacked the pavilion causing major damage and a couple of unnamed West Indian cricketers suffered minor injuries from broken glass. Chappell recalls a conversation after the event with West Indian wicketkeeper Deryck Murray. Murray insisted that the riot was a result of growing unhappiness at the Guyanese president Arthur Chung and that they used the abandoned cricket as an excuse. He believed that the rioters would never have intentionally harmed any of the cricketers. The words reassured some of the Australians, but many wanted to leave Guyana immediately and head to the next island, while some (about eight, which is half the squad) were considering returning to Australia. Chappell demanded his players stay and play, making a statement to the West Indian fans that they are not intimidated and will play to win. Play proceeded on the third morning as if nothing had happened. The ground was cleared of broken glass and the game played out to a draw with a century from Greg Chappell confirming his status as the outstanding batsman of the series.

=== 5th Supertest ===
6–10 April 1979 (5 Day Match)
scorecard

Australia	v	West Indies
234 (69.2 overs); Greg Chappell 104; Colin Croft 4/56 (18.2)		438 (124.2 overs); Lawrence Rowe 135; Dennis Lillee 6/125 (33.2)
415/6 (128 overs); Rod Marsh 102*; Michael Holding 2/74 (25)

Match Drawn
Antigua Recreation Ground, Saint John's, Antigua and Barbuda
Umpires: Douglas Sang Hue & Ralph Gosein
Player of the match: Greg Chappell

- West Indies won the toss and elected to field

== One Day Internationals ==
=== 1st ODI ===
20 February 1979
Scorecard

West Indies; 174/8 (40 overs)	v	Australia; 138/8 (40 overs)
Roy Fredericks 50; Jeff Thomson 3/44 (9)		David Hookes 66; Michael Holding 4/22 (9)

West Indies won by 36 runs
Sabina Park, Kingston, Jamaica
Umpires: Johnny Gayle (WI) and Douglas Sang Hue (WI)
Player of the match: Michael Holding (WI)

- Australia won the toss and chose to field
- 40 over match

=== 2nd ODI ===
21 February 1979
Scorecard

West Indies; 132 (36.3 overs)	v	Australia; 133/9 (38.3 overs)
Roy Fredericks 42; Jeff Thomson 5/31 (7.3)		Greg Chappell 57; Colin Croft 3/9 (9)

Australia won by 1 wicket
Sabina Park, Kingston, Jamaica
Umpires: Johnny Gayle (WI) and Ralph Gosein (WI)
Player of the match: Jeff Thomson (Aus)

- West Indies won the toss and chose to bat
- 40 over match

=== 3rd ODI ===
3 March 1979
Scorecard

West Indies; 190 (42.1 overs)	v	Australia; 184 (43.1 overs)
Gordon Greenidge 56; Max Walker 4/31 (9)		Bruce Laird 56; Collis King 3/29 (9)

West Indies won by 6 runs
Mindoo Philip Park, Castries, Saint Lucia
Umpires: Michael Hippolyte (WI) and Ralph Gosein (WI)
Player of the match: Collis King (WI)

- Australia won the toss and chose to field
- 45 over match

=== 4th ODI ===
4 March 1979
Scorecard

West Indies	v	Australia

Match abandoned without a ball being bowled
Mindoo Philip Park, Castries, Saint Lucia

- 45 over match

=== 5th ODI ===
6 March 1979
Scorecard

Australia; 201/4 (45 overs)	v	West Indies; 159 (39.2 overs)
David Hookes 62*; Joel Garner 2/19 (9)		Desmond Haynes 59; Dennis Lillee 4/19 (8)

Australia won by 42 runs
Kensington Oval, Bridgetown, Barbados
Umpires: Stanton Parris (WI) and Ralph Gosein (WI)
Player of the match: David Hookes (Aus)

- West Indies won the toss and chose to field
- 45 over match

=== 6th ODI ===
7 March 1979
Scorecard

West Indies; 240/8 (45 overs)	v	Australia; 233/7 (45 overs)
Viv Richards 89; Dennis Lillee 2/32 (9)		Martin Kent 109; Wayne Daniel 2/33 (9)

West Indies won by 7 runs
Kensington Oval, Bridgetown, Barbados
Umpires: Douglas Sang Hue (WI) and David Archer (WI)
Player of the match: Martin Kent (Aus)

- Australia won the toss and chose to field
- 45 over match

=== 7th ODI ===
29 March 1979
Scorecard

Australia; 209/7 (45 overs)	v	West Indies; 212/4 (45 overs)
Rick McCosker 89; Wayne Daniel 3/36 (9)		Gordon Greenidge 95; Len Pascoe 2/39 (8.2)

West Indies won by 6 wickets
Albion Sports Complex, Albion, Guyana
Umpires: Ralph Gosein (WI) and Compton Vyfhuis (WI)
Player of the match: Gordon Greenidge (WI)

- West Indies won the toss and chose to field
- 45 over match

=== 8th ODI ===
31 March 1979
Scorecard

West Indies; 206/7 (45 overs)	v	Australia; 18/6 (15 overs)
Viv Richards 59; Mick Malone 2/33 (9)		Rick McCosker 10; Andy Roberts 4/7 (7)

West Indies won on faster run rate
Queen's Park Oval, Port of Spain, Trinidad and Tobago
Umpires: Douglas Sang Hue (WI) and Stuart Ishmael (WI)
Player of the match: Andy Roberts (WI)

- Australia won the toss and chose to field
- Australia given revised target of 69
- 45 over match

=== 9th ODI ===
1 April 1979
Scorecard

West Indies; 207/7 (45 overs)	v	Australia; 153 (36.5 overs)
Desmond Haynes 61; Gary Gilmour 3/65 (9)		Rod Marsh 46; Joel Garner 3/12 (6.5)

West Indies won by 54 runs
Queen's Park Oval, Port of Spain, Trinidad and Tobago
Umpires: Gary Duperouzel (Aus) and Ralph Gosein (WI)
Player of the match: Desmond Haynes (WI)

- Australia won the toss and chose to field
- 45 over match

=== 10th ODI ===
2 April 1979
Scorecard

Australia; 206/9 (45 overs)	v	West Indies; 176/4 (26.5 overs)
Martin Kent 61; Colin Croft 3/36 (9)		Gordon Greenidge 73; Len Pascoe 2/57 (9)

West Indies won by 6 wickets
Queen's Park Oval, Port of Spain, Trinidad and Tobago
Umpires: C Ramjohn (WI) and Stuart Ishmael (WI)
Player of the match: Gordon Greenidge (WI)

- West Indies won the toss and chose to field
- West Indies set revised target of 174 runs in 38 overs
- 45 over match

=== 11th ODI ===
4 April 1979
Scorecard

Australia; 137/9 (45 overs)	v	West Indies; 138/2 (37.4 overs)
Rod Marsh 36*; Rick McCosker 36; Colin Croft 5/21 (9)		Desmond Haynes 50*; Richie Robinson 1/29 (7)

West Indies won by 8 wickets
Windsor Park, Roseau, Dominica
Umpires: Phillip Alleyne (WI) and Douglas Sang Hue (WI)
Player of the match: Colin Croft (WI)

- West Indies won the toss and chose to field
- 45 over match

=== 12th ODI ===
13 April 1979
Scorecard

West Indies	v	Australia

Match abandoned without a ball being bowled
Warner Park, Basseterre, Saint Kitts and Nevis

- 45 over match
