= Rebel cricket tours to South Africa =

Series of cricket tours conducted by South Africa during apartheid bans

Between 1982 and 1990, during apartheid in South Africa, there were seven rebel tours made by unofficial international cricket teams to the country.

They were known as rebel tours because the international cricketing bodies banned South Africa from competitive international cricket throughout this period because of apartheid. As such the tours were organised and conducted despite the express disapproval of national cricket boards and governments, the International Cricket Conference and international organisations such as the United Nations. The tours were the subject of enormous controversy and remain a sensitive topic throughout the cricket-playing world.

== Origins ==
Until Olympic exclusion in 1964 and the D'Oliveira affair in 1968, only white athletes had been allowed to represent South Africa in international sport, a reflection of apartheid society in South Africa from 1948, and the social conventions prior to that time.

In 1971, an international sports boycott was instituted against South Africa to voice global disapproval of their selection policies and apartheid in general. South Africa subsequently became a world sporting pariah, and were excluded from the Olympics, the FIFA World Cup, Test cricket, international rugby union and a host of other sports.

The boycott effected measurable change on policy and opinion in sports selection – and cricket in particular. In 1976, the South African Cricket Union (SACU) was created to administer the game in the republic on a multi-racial, meritocratic basis: so-called "normal" cricket. However, this was insufficient to ensure South Africa's re-admission to international cricket. Inside the Republic, many non-whites resented "normal" cricket, which was seen as a feeble concession in the wider context of life under apartheid, and declined to take part. Outside the Republic, three of the six ICC Full Members—India, Pakistan and the West Indies—flatly refused to countenance re-admission until apartheid itself was dismantled.

After a decade of isolation, cricket in the country was weak: standards, attendances and youth participation were all declining. Overseas, the game had been revolutionised by the World Cup and World Series Cricket, but isolation had deprived South Africa of these commercial and competitive engines. In 1979, Doug Insole, an English representative on the ICC, told SACU's Ali Bacher: "Until apartheid goes, you can forget about getting back into world cricket."

Bacher and SACU felt obliged to act to "keep the game alive in South Africa". Since players were endangering their careers by breaking the boycott, SACU had to offer substantial sums to entice their targets. These rebels would play "unofficial" internationals against a South Africa team who considered themselves as strong as any team in world cricket, except the West Indies. In the earliest rebel tours, Mike Procter and Peter Kirsten captained home teams featuring Barry Richards, Graeme Pollock, Clive Rice and Garth Le Roux. By their conclusion in 1990, many of them had retired and were replaced by the likes of Hansie Cronje and Allan Donald.

The boycott movement opposed any such tours: they felt that engagement lent credibility and a propaganda coup to the National Party. The SACU insisted that all funding came directly from commercial sponsorship, and that the tours would be conducted independently of government. Initially, at least, overseas opponents could not prove otherwise, while inside South Africa, non-white opposition, as under apartheid more generally, was barely heard due to restrictions on freedoms of press, speech and assembly.

== England XI, 1981–82 ==
The first major tour was by an English team led by Graham Gooch in March 1982. Twelve cricketers, 11 of them with Test caps, had agreed in secret to make a one-month tour of the Republic. The news only broke when they arrived in Johannesburg. The players expected a brief public outcry and a slap on the wrist from the ICC. Instead they were the subject of global outrage among press and politicians, and labelled "the Dirty Dozen" in the Houses of Parliament.

The reaction in South Africa could not have been more different. The government and white newspapers hailed the return of international cricket. Apart from Ian Botham, it was said, this was the full-strength England team. Springbok colours were awarded to the home side in a series of three "Tests". There were also three "one-day internationals".

The on-field action "made a mockery of the immense off-field publicity". The so-called South African Breweries XI were under-prepared and, with the exception of Gooch and Emburey, either past their best or fairly marginal members of the England side (in fact, Taylor and later call-ups Humpage and Sidebottom had not played a Test for England at the time, and Humpage never did play a Test at all). They were beaten by a South Africa team for whom the uncapped Jimmy Cook and Vintcent van der Bijl starred. The Proteas, captained by Mike Procter, won the "Test" series 1–0 and "ODI" series 3–0.

The rebels, who numbered 15 after hiring three further players to cover injuries, all received three-year bans from international cricket. These suspensions ended the careers of more than half the squad including Geoffrey Boycott, the world's leading Test run-scorer at that time. Lever (1), Sidebottom (1), Taylor (2), Willey (6) and Larkins (7) each played a few more Tests, but only Gooch and Emburey had extensive Test careers afterwards. Both later captained England – Emburey for two tests in 1988 against the West Indies, having been a fixture in the side since his return in 1985, and Gooch for the final test of that series, then later as the regular captain from 1989 to 1993, remaining as a player for two more years. Emburey also went on England's second rebel tour in 1989, served another three-year ban for it, and was selected again for some matches between 1992 and 1995.

- Squad: Graham Gooch (captain), Dennis Amiss, Geoffrey Boycott, John Emburey, Mike Hendrick, Geoff Humpage, Alan Knott, Wayne Larkins, John Lever, Chris Old, Arnold Sidebottom, Les Taylor, Derek Underwood, Peter Willey, Bob Woolmer. Graham Dilley had pulled out of the tour before it got underway.

== Arosa Sri Lanka, 1982–83 ==
Sri Lanka was a fledgling Test nation in 1982, playing their inaugural match against England at Colombo in February of that year. Bandula Warnapura's side were beaten by seven wickets against an experienced visiting team and would fail to win four further Tests as the year progressed.

Then in October it was announced that Warnapura was leading a 14-man rebel squad to South Africa. The team would be called Arosa Sri Lanka after the initials of their player manager Anthony Ralph Opatha and the host nation. The players were vehemently denounced across India, Pakistan and the Caribbean as well as in their homeland.

For the second successive tour, white South Africa was forced to put on a brave front in acclaiming sporting triumph where there was none. A full-strength Sri Lankan team was some way off international competitiveness so it was little surprise that a makeshift rebel outfit was utterly humiliated, failing to win a single tour match. Now captained by Peter Kirsten of Western Province, South Africa comfortably won all four 'ODIs' and both 'Tests'. Lawrence Seeff, who replaced the injured Barry Richards, and Graeme Pollock made 188 and 197 respectively in the second 'Test' but protested that the matches could not be classed as international cricket. SACU, trying to protect the 'unofficial international' brand it had created, fined them for the admission.

Life became very difficult for the Sri Lankans who were ostracised at home for a decision many called treasonous. All players received a 25-year ban from the Board of Control for Cricket in Sri Lanka, which would be lifted in 1991. None played international cricket for the island again, even after the ban was lifted, although Aponso represented the Netherlands in the 1996 Cricket World Cup at the age of 43.

- Squad: Bandula Warnapura (captain), Flavian Aponso, Hemantha Devapriya, Lantra Fernando, Mahes Goonatilleke, Nirmal Hettiaratchi, Lalith Kaluperuma, Susantha Karunaratne, Bernard Perera, Anura Ranasinghe, Ajit de Silva, Bandula de Silva, Jeryl Woutersz, Tony Opatha (player/manager).

== West Indies tours, 1982–83 and 1983–84 ==
The West Indian players were mainly talented understudies struggling to break into the great West Indian Test team of the period, or men past their prime as Test players. First-class cricketers in the West Indies were then poorly paid and the participants, many of whom had irregular or no employment in the off-season, received between US$100,000 and US$125,000 for the two tours. West Indies cricket was so strong that Clive Lloyd had little need for the likes of Lawrence Rowe, Collis King and Sylvester Clarke. Rowe has since stated that he and several other players were disillusioned with the West Indies Cricket Board for not selecting them despite good performances.

The strength of Caribbean cricket was evidenced in the 'international' matches, where South Africa received their first real test. A fiercely contested four-week series in 1982–3 took 'unofficial internationals' to new heights, the Proteas winning the one-day series 4–2 while the 'Test' series was drawn 1–1. The dominant theme of the match-ups was West Indian fast bowling. Colin Croft was one of four World Cup winners in the party. Their pace battery, featuring Clarke, Croft, Stephenson, Bernard Julien and Ezra Moseley, considerably unsettled the Proteas batsmen, who were forced to wear helmets for the first time.

The frantic first series, again organised in secret and conducted on the hoof, set up a fierce battle when the West Indians returned for a full tour the following season. Clarke was by now the dominant player on either side, claiming four five-wicket hauls in the 2–1 'Test' series win. The West Indian XI also won the one-day series 4–2, helped slightly by the Proteas weakening: Barry Richards and Vince van der Bijl retired in 1983, and Mike Procter, 36, played only a single 'one-day' international over both tours. Henry Fotheringham, Ken McEwan, Rupert Hanley, Dave Richardson and Mandy Yachad made their debuts for South Africa. Clive Rice was handed the captaincy for the 3rd and 4th "Tests" after the sacking of Peter Kirsten for the 'ODI' series defeat. Kirsten maintained his place in the team and top scored in the next match. Graham Gooch played against the West Indies team during both tours as a member of a South African provincial side.

The improvement in the on-field action was in strict contrast to the off-field environment. South Africa stood permanently on the brink of civil war as PW Botha's brutal government repressed the black majority and excluded them from a new 'multi-racial' parliament. This oppression was met with violent reprisals while the rebels were controversial figures in the townships that had worshipped West Indian cricketers only to see them collaborating with the apartheid enemy.

The participants received a life ban from Caribbean cricket in 1983. In many instances, they were ostracised socially and professionally, such was the hostility toward players that complied with the South African apartheid system. In contrast, the players commented on a warm reception from both blacks and whites in South Africa and the tour may have been a positive influence on relations between races. It was one of the few occasions when white and black people had played sport together in South Africa. The players' bans were lifted in 1989 (although Monte Lynch appeared in ODI's for England a year earlier against the touring West Indians) but the only tour member who played for West Indies again was Moseley, at the age of 32 (two tests in the 1989–90 home series against England: though he did not take many wickets, his appearance was chiefly notable for breaking Graham Gooch's hand, forcing Gooch – now England's captain – to miss the remainder of the series). Franklyn Stephenson and Clarke had very successful first-class careers in South African and English domestic cricket: and Stephenson in particular could perhaps be thought unlucky not to be given a chance in Test cricket, given the precedent set by Moseley's selection and the fact that his performances in the English county championship had been nothing short of spectacular.

A fierce battle raged – and continues to rage – over the morality of the West Indian tours.

- 1982–3 squad: Lawrence Rowe (captain), Richard Austin, Herbert Chang, Sylvester Clarke, Colin Croft, Alvin Greenidge, Bernard Julien, Alvin Kallicharran, Collis King, Everton Mattis, Ezra Moseley, David Murray, Derick Parry, Franklyn Stephenson, Emmerson Trotman, Ray Wynter, Albert Padmore (player/manager).
- 1983–4 squad: Lawrence Rowe (captain), Hartley Alleyne, Faoud Bacchus, Sylvester Clarke, Colin Croft, Alvin Greenidge, Bernard Julien, Alvin Kallicharran, Collis King, Monte Lynch, Everton Mattis, Ezra Moseley, David Murray, Derick Parry, Franklyn Stephenson, Emmerson Trotman, Albert Padmore (player/manager).

== Australia tours, 1985–86 and 1986–87 ==
The tours by the Australians were led by former Test captain Kim Hughes, with South Africa winning both "Test" series 1–0. The squad included several players who represented Australia at Test level, such as fast bowlers Terry Alderman, Rodney Hogg and Carl Rackemann, spinners Trevor Hohns and Tom Hogan opening batsman John Dyson and Steve Smith, weakening the official Australian Test side by depriving it of several of its best players. The tour prompted Australian prime minister Bob Hawke to call the group "traitors" and in retrospect has been called "one of the most painful and traumatic moments in Australian cricket history."

Hughes accused the Australian Cricket Board of fostering dissatisfaction among the players, making recruitment for the rebel tours easy. Hughes did return to Sheffield Shield cricket in 1988 but never played international cricket again and later returned to South Africa to play for Natal. However, Alderman, Hohns and Rackemann returned to represent Australia in later series, starting in 1989. Wessels—a South African by birth, who had been playing for Australia only because of the international ban on South African sport—returned to his native country, playing and captaining for South Africa on their readmission to Test cricket, and later became the first person to score official Test centuries for two nations.

On the first Australian tour, 1985–86, fast bowlers Hugh Page and Corrie van Zyl made their debuts for South Africa. During the second tour in 1986–87, batsman Brian Whitfield and spinner Omar Henry who became the second non-white player to represent South Africa, and two future stars, all-rounder Brian McMillan and fast bowler Allan Donald made their South African debuts. Kepler Wessels played for the Australian team on their second tour.

South Africa won both 'Test' series 1–0, both 'ODI' series and a 'day-night' series. However, the on-field action could never escape the shadow of apartheid. Newspaper revelations in January 1986 revealed what non-white leaders in South Africa and anti-apartheid campaigners worldwide had been claiming for years: the tours were not funded by business, as Ali Bacher and SACU had always insisted, but by the apartheid government through enormous tax breaks.

- 1985–6 squad: Kim Hughes (captain), Terry Alderman, John Dyson, Peter Faulkner, Mike Haysman, Tom Hogan, Rodney Hogg, Trevor Hohns, John Maguire, Rod McCurdy, Carl Rackemann, Steve Rixon, Greg Shipperd, Steve Smith, Mick Taylor, Graham Yallop.
- 1986–7 squad: Kim Hughes (captain), Terry Alderman, John Dyson, Peter Faulkner, Mike Haysman, Tom Hogan, Rodney Hogg, Trevor Hohns, John Maguire, Rod McCurdy, Carl Rackemann, Steve Rixon, Greg Shipperd, Steve Smith, Mick Taylor, Kepler Wessels, Graham Yallop.

== England XI, 1989–90 ==
In 1990, the final tour was led by former England captain Mike Gatting. The team included former and current England players such as batsmen Tim Robinson, Bill Athey and Chris Broad, wicketkeeper Bruce French, and the fast bowlers Paul Jarvis, Graham Dilley and Neil Foster.

Kepler Wessels returned to represent the land of his birth. Roy Pienaar, Dave Rundle and Richard Snell made their debuts for South Africa. Jimmy Cook was appointed as South African captain and Allan Donald took 8 wickets for 59 in the match. South Africa went on to win the only 'Test'. England lost the limited overs series 3–1.

Most of the squad did not play for England again. Gatting served a three-year ban from Test cricket before his recall to the England side for the tour of India and Sri Lanka in 1992–93, along with John Emburey and Paul Jarvis. Emburey made both rebel tours and served two suspensions. Foster subsequently played a solitary Test, against Australia at Lord's in 1993, as did Alan Wells (against the West Indies in 1995). Matthew Maynard played three more tests, two in the 1993 Ashes and one in the following tour of the West Indies.

The squad for the rebel tour was announced during the fourth Test of the 1989 Ashes series in England. Players in the squad were not considered for the rest of the series, which allowed future long-term England players, batsman and later England captain Michael Atherton as well as fast bowler Devon Malcolm, an opportunity to make their England debuts.

The tour was a financial disaster as it coincided with the "unbanning" of the African National Congress and the release from prison of Nelson Mandela. As South Africa began the dismantling of apartheid, Ali Bacher was surprised at the scale of the mass demonstrations against the tour as previous rebel tours had passed smoothly in the country. The second tour scheduled for 1990–91 was cancelled.

- Squad: Mike Gatting (captain), Bill Athey, Kim Barnett, Chris Broad, Chris Cowdrey, Graham Dilley, Richard Ellison, John Emburey, Neil Foster, Bruce French, Paul Jarvis, Matthew Maynard, Tim Robinson, Greg Thomas, Alan Wells, David Graveney (player/manager).

== South Africa returns to international cricket ==
Thirty-one players were selected to play for South Africa in the 19 rebel "Tests". Vintcent van der Bijl, Rupert Hanley, Denys Hobson, Kevin McKenzie, Alan Kourie, Brian Whitfield, Kenny Watson, Roy Pienaar, Hugh Page, Ray Jennings, Henry Fotheringham, Lawrence Seeff, Stephen Jefferies, Ken McEwan and Garth Le Roux all retired or were beyond their prime before official international cricket resumed for South Africa. Before isolation, Graeme Pollock (23 Tests), Mike Procter (7 Tests) and Barry Richards (4 Tests) had played official Test cricket.

South Africa resumed official international cricket in 1991 with a short tour of India, and participation in the 1992 Cricket World Cup in Australia and New Zealand. Clive Rice (3), Corrie van Zyl (2), Dave Rundle (2) and Mandy Yachad (1), only played in official ODIs for South Africa. Being in the twilight of their careers, Jimmy Cook played 3 Tests and 6 ODIs, Peter Kirsten 12 Tests and 40 ODIs, Adrian Kuiper 1 Test and 25 ODIs and Omar Henry 3 Tests and 3 ODIs.

Allan Donald (with 72 Tests and 164 ODIs), Brian McMillan (38 Tests and 78 ODIs) and Dave Richardson (42 Tests and 122 ODIs), became the backbone of the new Protea team, and to a lesser extent, Richard Snell who played in 5 Tests and 42 ODIs. Kepler Wessels became captain of the team and played in 16 Tests and 55 ODIs for South Africa. During the years of isolation, Wessels played for Australia in 24 Tests and 54 ODIs.

An additional eleven players were selected to play for South Africa in rebel 'ODIs' without playing in a rebel 'Test'. Of these, Daryll Cullinan (70 Tests and 138 ODIs), Fanie de Villiers (18 Tests and 83 ODIs) and Mark Rushmere (1 Test and 4 ODIs) played both official Test and ODI matches when South Africa returned to international cricket. Eric Simons (23 ODIs) and Tim Shaw (9 ODIs) only played official ODIs.

Six players, Robert Armitage, Robert Bentley, Lee Barnard, Anton Ferreira, Brett Matthews and Trevor Madsen did not play official international cricket either before or after South Africa's 20-year moratorium from International cricket between 1971 and 1991.

All of the matches played during the rebel tours were granted first-class status, which was subsequently withdrawn by the International Cricket Council in 1993. As of August 2007, the ICC is reviewing the status of all matches played in South Africa between 1961 and 1991, including those played during the rebel tours, with a view to restoring first-class status to some matches.

== See also ==
- New Zealand Cavaliers
- Rugby union and apartheid
- Sporting boycott of South Africa during the apartheid era
- SuperSport Series
