= English cricket team in the West Indies in 1973–74 =

International cricket tour

The England national cricket team toured the West Indies from January to April 1974 and played a five-match Test series against the West Indies cricket team which was drawn 1–1. England were captained by Mike Denness; the West Indies by Rohan Kanhai.

== Test series summary ==
=== First Test ===
2–7 February 1974
(5-day match)
Scorecard

England	v	West Indies
131 (55 overs); AW Greig 37 (79); KD Boyce 4/42 (19 overs)		392 (122.4 overs); AI Kallicharran 158 (334); PI Pocock 5/110 (43 overs)
392 (166.2 overs); DL Amiss 174 (429); LR Gibbs 6/108 (57.2 overs)		132/3 (37.5 overs); RC Fredericks 65* (98); DL Underwood 2/48 (12 overs)

West Indies won by 7 wickets
Queen's Park Oval, Port of Spain, Trinidad
Umpires: RG Gosein and D Sang Hue

- West Indies won the toss and elected to field.
- 4 February was taken as a rest day.

=== Second Test ===
16–21 February 1974
(5-day match)
Scorecard

England	v	West Indies
353 (157 overs); G Boycott 68 (263); GS Sobers 3/65 (33 overs)		583/9d (196 overs); LG Rowe 120 (258); RGD Willis 3/97 (24 overs)
432/9 (183 overs); DL Amiss 262* (563); AG Barrett 3/87 (54 overs)

Match drawn
Sabina Park, Kingston, Jamaica
Umpires: HBD Jordan and D Sang Hue

- England won the toss and elected to bat.
- 18 February was taken as a rest day.

=== Third Test ===
6–11 March 1974
(5-day match)
Scorecard

England	v	West Indies
395 (144.4 overs); AW Greig 148 (320); BD Julien 5/57 (26 overs)		596/8d (154 overs); LG Rowe 302 (430); AW Greig 6/164 (46 overs)
277/7 (126.3 overs); KWR Fletcher 129* (357); CH Lloyd 2/13 (12 overs)

Match drawn
Kensington Oval, Bridgetown, Barbados
Umpires: SE Parris and D Sang Hue

- West Indies won the toss and elected to field.
- 8 March was taken as a rest day.
- AME Roberts (WIN) made his Test debut.

=== Fourth Test ===
22–27 March 1974
(5-day match)
Scorecard

England	v	West Indies
448 (171.4 overs); AW Greig 121 (254); KD Boyce 3/70 (27.4 overs)		198/4 (86.5 overs); RC Fredericks 98 (249); AW Greig 2/57 (24 overs)

Match drawn
Bourda, Georgetown, British Guiana
Umpires: D Sang Hue and CF Vyfhuis

- England won the toss and elected to bat.
- 25 March was taken as a rest day.
- There was no play on the fourth day.
- This would prove the last Test played by England in Georgetown until 1993–94. Due to the refusal of the Guyanese government to admit Robin Jackman the 1980–81 Test there would be cancelled, no Test in Guyana would be scheduled in England's 1985–86 tour, and the 1989–90 Test would be abandoned without a ball bowled due to rain.

=== Fifth Test ===
30 March–5 April 1974
(6-day match)
Scorecard

England	v	West Indies
267 (135.3 overs); G Boycott 99 (340); LR Gibbs 3/70 (34.3 overs)		305 (117.1 overs); LG Rowe 123 (340); AW Greig 8/86 (36.1 overs)
263 (149.2 overs); G Boycott 112 (385); BD Julien 3/31 (22 overs)		199 (88.3 overs); RC Fredericks 36 (104); AW Greig 5/70 (33 overs)

England won by 26 runs
Queen's Park Oval, Port of Spain, Trinidad
Umpires: S Ishmael and D Sang Hue

- England won the toss and elected to bat.
- 1 April was taken as a rest day.
