= Franklyn Stephenson =

West Indian cricketer

Personal information
- Born: 8 April 1959 (age 67); Saint James, Barbados
- Batting: Right-handed
- Bowling: Right-arm fast

Domestic team information
- Years: Team
- 1981/82: Tasmania
- 1981/82–1989/90: Barbados
- 1982–1983: Gloucestershire
- 1988–1991: Nottinghamshire
- 1991/92–1996/97: Orange Free State
- 1992–1995: Sussex

Career statistics
Competition	First-class	List A
Matches	219	282
Runs scored	8,622	4,717
Batting average	27.99	22.67
100s/50s	12/43	2/16
Top score	166	108
Balls bowled	40,297	14,391
Wickets	792	448
Bowling average	24.26	19.91
5 wickets in innings	44	9
10 wickets in match	10	0
Best bowling	8/47	6/9
Catches/stumpings	100/–	61/–
- Source: CricketArchive, 8 May 2012

Franklyn DaCosta Stephenson (born 8 April 1959) is a former cricketer from Barbados who played as a right handed batsman and pacer. Stephenson played as an allrounder for his native Barbados together with Tasmania, Orange Free State, Gloucestershire, Nottinghamshire and Sussex in his cricketing career. As an aggressive middle-order batsman and genuinely quick pacer, he was also known for being one of the greatest exponents of the slower ball.

== Playing career ==
Stephenson played for the West Indies Young Cricketers team on their 1979 English tour. During 1981 he made his first-class debut, playing for Tasmania. He also started to feature, in that year, for his native Barbados and English side Gloucestershire.

During the following winter, Stephenson joined a rebel West Indies team, led by Lawrence Rowe, that twice toured South Africa. This team featured players such as Alvin Kallicharran, Collis King, Colin Croft and Ezra Moseley. The West Indian rebels played in unofficial Tests and ODIs against the South African national cricket team who, due to apartheid, were at the time barred from world cricket. The rebel West Indian cricketers were later handed a lifetime ban from playing cricket by the WICB. After those rebel tours came to an end, he began playing for South African outfit Free State. As the lifetime ban was eventually lifted in 1989, Stephenson was able to play for Barbados in the 1989–90 Red Stripe Cup. Stephenson though never went on to play international cricket. He is regarded by some cricketing aficionados as one of if not the greatest cricketer who never played for the West Indies.

Stephenson then joined Nottinghamshire in 1988. With county cricket sides having now only one overseas player, Stephenson came to the club as a replacement for fellow all-rounders Clive Rice and Richard Hadlee. Stephenson impressed in his debut season at Notts, in achieving the all-rounder's "double" of 1,000 runs and 100 wickets. He became only the second and last cricketer since the reduction in first-class games in 1969, after his Notts predecessor Hadlee (1981), to achieve this feat, in making 1018 runs and taking 125 wickets. He was thereafter named a Wisden Cricketer of the Year in 1989 for this achievement, and was also the Cricket Society's leading all-rounder. Stephenson's attained the batting aspect of the double by notching a century in each innings against Yorkshire in Notts' final match of the season. He also took 11 wickets in the game, which Nottinghamshire eventually lost.

Stephenson continued as an effective all-rounder for further three seasons with Nottinghamshire. He eventually left Notts to join Sussex, where he played for another four seasons. During 1994, he scored over 750 runs and claimed a total of 67 wickets for that club.

Stephenson retired from English county cricket after 1995 and from South African domestic cricket after the 1996–97 season. Stephenson continued to earn acclaim for his notable all round feats along with his effective use of slower balls in both the First Class and List A forms of the game.
