= 1977 English cricket season =

The 1977 English cricket season was the 78th in which the County Championship had been an official competition. It was played out in the aftermath of the Kerry Packer affair. Geoffrey Boycott returned to Test cricket and managed to score his 100th career century in the Headingley Test. An Australian team that was clearly affected by Packer proved to be no match for an England team that stayed together despite the controversy. The County Championship title was shared for only the third time in history after Middlesex and Kent finished on the same points.

== Honours ==
- County Championship - Kent, Middlesex (shared title)
- Gillette Cup - Middlesex
- Sunday League - Leicestershire
- Benson & Hedges Cup - Gloucestershire
- Minor Counties Championship - Suffolk
- Second XI Championship - Yorkshire II
- Wisden - Ian Botham, Mike Hendrick, Alan Jones, Ken McEwan, Bob Willis

== Test series ==
Cumulative record - Test wins	1876–1977
England	74
Australia	88
Drawn	68

== Leading batsmen ==
1977 English cricket season – leading batsmen by average
Name	Innings	Runs	Highest	Average	100s
Geoffrey Boycott	30	1701	191	68.04	7
Viv Richards	35	2161	241*	65.48	7
Gordon Greenidge	32	1771	208	61.06	6
Greg Chappell	25	1182	161*	59.10	5
Graham Roope	31	1431	115	55.03	5

1977 English cricket season – leading batsmen by aggregate
Name	Innings	Runs	Highest	Average	100s
Viv Richards	35	2161	241*	65.48	7
Gordon Greenidge	32	1771	208	61.06	6
Ken McEwan	37	1702	218	51.57	8
Geoffrey Boycott	30	1701	191	68.04	7
Zaheer Abbas	36	1584	205*	52.80	5

== Leading bowlers ==
1977 English cricket season – leading bowlers by average
Name	Balls	Maidens	Runs	Wickets	Average
Bob Woolmer	805	50	289	19	15.21
Mike Hendrick	3376	189	1068	67	15.94
Wayne Daniel	3097	142	1233	75	16.44
Sarfraz Nawaz	2920	130	1246	73	17.06
Richard Hills	1293	60	566	33	17.15

1977 English cricket season – leading bowlers by aggregate
Name	Balls	Maidens	Runs	Wickets	Average
Mike Procter	4665	226	1967	109	18.04
Ian Botham	3995	149	1983	88	22.53
Geoff Miller	3934	224	1551	87	17.82
John Shepherd	4432	216	1734	87	19.93
Dilip Doshi	5705	288	2442	82	29.78

== External sources ==
- CricketArchive – season and tournament itineraries

== Annual reviews ==
- Playfair Cricket Annual 1978
- Wisden Cricketers' Almanack 1978
