= English cricket team in the West Indies in 1989–90 =

International cricket tour

The England national cricket team toured the West Indies from January to April 1990 and played a five-match Test series against the West Indies cricket team which the West Indies won 2–1. The West Indies were captained by Viv Richards, and England by Graham Gooch. England's victory in the First Test at Kingston was their first over the West Indies since the 1973–74 series. The Second Test, scheduled as England’s first at Bourda since the 1973–74 tour (due to the Guyanese government’s refusal to admit Robin Jackman in 1980–81 and to admit anyone who had played or coached in apartheid South Africa in 1985–86), was abandoned without a ball being bowled. The Third Test, in which the West Indies were captained by Desmond Haynes, resulted in a draw; following an injury to Gooch in that match, Allan Lamb replaced him as captain for the final two Tests, both of which were won by the West Indies.

In addition to the Tests, the teams played a five-match Limited Overs International (LOI) series which the West Indies won 3–0. A further two LOIs were scheduled to replace the abandoned Test in Guyana.

== Test match summary ==
=== First Test ===
24 February – 1 March 1990
(5–day match)
Scorecard

West Indies	v	England
164 (64 overs); DL Haynes 36 (115); ARC Fraser 5/28 (20 overs)		364 (109.2 overs); AJ Lamb 132 (205); CA Walsh 5/68 (27.2 overs)
240 (72.3 overs); CA Best 64 (136); GC Small 4/58 (22 overs)		41/1 (16.3 overs); W Larkins 29* (60); IR Bishop 1/17 (7.3 overs)

England won by 9 wickets
Sabina Park, Kingston, Jamaica
Umpires: LH Barker and SA Bucknor
Player of the match: AJ Lamb (ENG)

- West Indies won the toss and elected to bat.
- 27 February was taken as a rest day.
- There was no play on the fourth day.
- N Hussain and AJ Stewart (both ENG) made their Test debuts.

=== Second Test ===
10 – 15 March 1990
(5–day match)
Scorecard

West Indies	v	England

Match abandoned without a ball bowled
Bourda, Georgetown, Guyana
Umpires: DM Archer and CR Duncan

- 13 March was planned as a rest day.
- The match was abandoned on the rest day. It was replaced by two one-day matches on the scheduled fourth and fifth days.

=== Third Test ===
23 – 28 March 1990
(5–day match)
Scorecard

West Indies	v	England
199 (65.1 overs); AL Logie 98 (139); DE Malcolm 4/60 (20 overs)		288 (137.2 overs); GA Gooch 84 (264); CEL Ambrose 4/59 (36.2 overs)
239 (84.2 overs); DL Haynes 45 (89); DE Malcolm 6/77 (26.2 overs)		120/5 (33 overs); AJ Stewart 31 (32); CA Walsh 3/27 (7 overs)

Match drawn
Queen's Park Oval, Port of Spain, Trinidad
Umpires: LH Barker and CE Cumberbatch
Player of the match: DE Malcolm (ENG)

- England won the toss and elected to field.
- 26 March was taken as a rest day.
- EA Moseley (WIN) made his Test debut.

=== Fourth Test ===
5 – 10 April 1990
(5–day match)
Scorecard

West Indies	v	England
446 (121.5 overs); CA Best 164 (245); GC Small 4/109 (35 overs)		358 (109.3 overs); AJ Lamb 119 (224); IR Bishop 4/70 (24.3 overs)
267/8d (68 overs); DL Haynes 109 (177); GC Small 4/74 (20 overs)		191 (91.4 overs); RC Russell 55 (238); CEL Ambrose 8/45 (22.4 overs)

West Indies won by 164 runs
Kensington Oval, Bridgetown, Barbados
Umpires: DM Archer and LH Barker
Player of the match: CEL Ambrose (WIN)

- England won the toss and elected to field.
- 9 April was taken as a rest day.

=== Fifth Test ===
12 – 16 April 1990
(5–day match)
Scorecard

England	v	West Indies
260 (91.1 overs); RJ Bailey 42 (101); IR Bishop 5/84 (28.1 overs)		446 (120.5 overs); DL Haynes 167 (317); DE Malcolm 4/126 (34.5 overs)
154 (47 overs); AJ Lamb 35 (59); CEL Ambrose 4/22 (13 overs)

West Indies won by an innings and 32 runs
Antigua Recreation Ground, St. John's, Antigua
Umpires: DM Archer and AE Weekes
Player of the match: DL Haynes (WIN)

- England won the toss and elected to bat.
- 13 April was taken as a rest day.
- The match was scheduled for five days but completed in four.

== ODI series summary ==
West Indies won the Cable and Wireless Series 3–0, with two no results.

=== 1st ODI ===
14 February 1990
Scorecard

West Indies; 208/8 (50 overs)	v	England; 26/1 (13 overs)
RB Richardson 51 (81); ARC Fraser 2/37 (10 overs)		GA Gooch 13* (4); MD Marshall 1/12 (6 overs)

No result
Queen's Park Oval, Port of Spain, Trinidad
Umpires: DM Archer and CE Cumberbatch

- England won the toss and elected to field.
- CC Lewis (ENG) and EA Moseley (WIN) made their ODI debuts.

=== 2nd ODI ===
17 February 1990
Scorecard

West Indies; 13/0 (5.5 overs)	v	England
CG Greenidge 8* (21)

No result
Queen's Park Oval, Port of Spain, Trinidad
Umpires: DM Archer and CE Cumberbatch

- England won the toss and elected to field.

=== 3rd ODI ===
3 March 1990
Scorecard

England; 214/8 (50 overs)	v	West Indies; 216/7 (50 overs)
AJ Lamb 66 (97); IR Bishop 4/28 (10 overs)		RB Richardson 108* (132); EE Hemmings 3/31 (10 overs)

West Indies won by 3 wickets
Sabina Park, Kingston, Jamaica
Umpires: LH Barker and SA Bucknor
Player of the match: RB Richardson (WIN)

- England won the toss and elected to bat.

=== 4th ODI ===
7 March 1990
Scorecard

England; 188/8 (48 overs)	v	West Indies; 191/4 (45.2 overs)
W Larkins 34 (62); CA Walsh 2/33 (10 overs)		CA Best 100 (119); EE Hemmings 1/33 (10 overs)

West Indies won by 6 wickets
Bourda, Georgetown, Guyana
Umpires: DM Archer and CR Duncan
Player of the match: CA Best (WIN)

- West Indies won the toss and elected to field.
- The match was reduced to 48 overs per side.

=== 5th ODI ===
3 April 1990
Scorecard

England; 214/3 (38 overs)	v	West Indies; 217/6 (37.3 overs)
RA Smith 69 (84); EA Moseley 1/43 (7 overs)		RB Richardson 80 (84); GC Small 3/29 (9 overs)

West Indies won by 4 wickets
Kensington Oval, Bridgetown, Barbados
Umpires: DM Archer and LH Barker
Player of the match: RB Richardson (WIN)

- West Indies won the toss and elected to field.
- The match was reduced before play started to 38 overs per side.

== Georgetown Test Match replacement ODIs ==
When the Georgetown Test was washed out, two replacement One-Day Internationals were arranged for the scheduled fourth and fifth days of the match; the first of these was itself washed out. These did not count towards the Cable and Wireless ODI Series.

=== 1st ODI ===
14 March 1990
Scorecard

West Indies	v	England

Bourda, Georgetown, Guyana
Umpires: DM Archer and CR Duncan

- No toss made

=== 2nd ODI ===
15 March 1990
Scorecard

England; 166/9 (49 overs)	v	West Indies; 167/3 (40.2 overs)
GA Gooch 42 (102); RJ Bailey 42 (54); CEL Ambrose 4/18 (9 overs)		CG Greenidge 77 (122); GC Small 1/32 (7 overs)

West Indies won by 7 wickets
Bourda, Georgetown, Guyana
Umpires: DM Archer and CR Duncan
Player of the match: CG Greenidge (WIN)

- West Indies won the toss and elected to field.
- The match was reduced to 49 overs per side.
- CB Lambert (WIN) made his ODI debut.
