= Ray Wynter =

Jamaican cricketer

Personal information
- Full name: Ray Ricardo Wynter
- Born: 27 November 1955 (age 70); Kingston, Jamaica
- Batting: Right-handed
- Bowling: Right-arm fast-medium
- Role: Bowler

International information
- National side: United States (1990)

Domestic team information
- Years: Team
- 1975–1983: Jamaica

Career statistics
Competition	First-class	List A
Matches	18	12
Runs scored	70	22
Batting average	5.38	4.40
100s/50s	0/0	0/0
Top score	13	9
Balls bowled	2,067	582
Wickets	33	15
Bowling average	37.54	24.53
5 wickets in innings	1	0
10 wickets in match	0	0
Best bowling	5/48	3/15
Catches/stumpings	10/–	0/–
- Source: CricketArchive, 22 February 2015

Ray Ricardo Wynter (born 27 November 1955) is a former Jamaican cricketer who played first-class and one-day cricket for Jamaica from 1975 until 1982. A right-handed batsman and right-arm opening bowler, he played 30 matches in all in those formats. In 1983, Wynter participated in a rebel tour of South Africa. As a result, he and all the other players on the tour received a lifetime ban from West Indian cricket. Wynter later emigrated to the United States, and played for the U.S. national team at the 1990 ICC Trophy.

== Domestic career ==
A native of Jamaica's capital, Kingston, Wynter played at under-19 level for Jamaica, representing the team in the regional under-19 competition. He made his senior first-class debut on 16 January 1976, against the Combined Islands in the Shell Shield. His first season saw him appear in five first-class matches, taking 10 wickets at 25.50. He took 5/48 against Guyana, which was to be a career-best. Wynter played only one limited-overs match in his first season, taking 2/27 against Barbados in the Gillette Cup.

Wynter had little success in his second Shell Shield season, taking only four wickets at 75.00 with a best of 2/28. He again played only a single one-day match. During the 1977–78 season, Wynter played in only two Shell Shield matches, taking a single wicket and also registering three ducks from four innings. However, he performed better in the one-day format, taking a career-best 3/15 against the Windward Islands. Wynter only appeared sporadically for Jamaica over the following seasons, in some cases not playing at all.

== Rebel tour ==
The 1981–82 season was Wynter's last for Jamaica. He appeared in five first-class matches, taking a career-best taking 14 wickets for the season (at 32.85). The following season, in January and February 1983, Wynter left Jamaica and controversially toured South Africa with a West Indies XI. The tour drew heavy criticism, due to its breaking of the sporting boycott of the country (in place during apartheid). Wynter played only a single major fixture on tour, a match against the South African national team. Opening the bowling with Sylvester Clarke in South Africa's first innings, he took the wickets of Kevin McKenzie and Garth Le Roux, finishing with 2/26. For taking part in the rebel tour, Wynter and the other participants received a life ban from professional cricket in the West Indies. He subsequently settled in the United States.

== U.S. career and later life ==
After his ban, Wynter settled in the United States. He continued playing cricket there, and at the age of 34 was selected to play for the American national team at the 1990 ICC Trophy in the Netherlands (the qualification tournament for the 1992 World Cup). Wynter played in all six of his team's matches at the tournament, taking seven wickets at an average of 20.28. Among his teammates, only Zamin Amin and Kamran Rasheed took more wickets. Wynter's best performance at the tournament was 3/30 from nine overs, taken against Papua New Guinea. The only other game in which he took more than a single wicket was against Kenya, where he took 2/39.
