= Ricky Hoyte =

West Indian cricketer (born 1969)

Personal information
- Full name: Ricardo Lawrence Hoyte
- Born: 15 October 1969 (age 57); St Michael, Barbados
- Batting: Left-handed
- Role: Wicket-keeper-batsman

Domestic team information
- Years: Team
- 1989/90–1998/99: Barbados

Career statistics
Competition	First-class	List A
Matches	32	15
Runs scored	1129	303
Batting average	24.02	30.30
100s/50s	0/7	0/2
Top score	76*	62*
Catches/stumpings	68/6	5/1
- Source: , 21 June 2019

Ricky Hoyte (born 15 October 1969) is a former West Indian cricketer. He was a left-handed batsman and a wicket-keeper. He played first-class and List A cricket for Barbados in West Indian domestic cricket from 1990 to 1999. He didn't play Test cricket or One Day Internationals for West Indies but did play for them at "A" Team level. His father (David Murray) and grandfather (Everton Weekes) both played Test cricket for the West Indies.
