= Hartley Alleyne =

Barbadian cricketer

Personal information
- Full name: Hartley Leroy Alleyne
- Born: 28 February 1957 (age 69); Derricks, Saint James, Barbados
- Batting: Right-handed
- Bowling: Right-arm fast
- Role: Bowler

Domestic team information
- Years: Team
- 1978/79–1981/82: Barbados
- 1979: Lincolnshire
- 1980–1982: Worcestershire
- 1984–1985: Buckinghamshire
- 1984/85–1989/90: Natal
- 1988–1989: Kent

Career statistics
Competition	First-class	List A
Matches	85	102
Runs scored	709	306
Batting average	9.98	9.56
100s/50s	0/1	0/0
Top score	72	32
Balls bowled	13,278	5,084
Wickets	254	146
Bowling average	27.66	22.45
5 wickets in innings	9	0
10 wickets in match	2	0
Best bowling	8/43	4/24
Catches/stumpings	17/–	11/–
- Source: CricInfo, 20 June 2019

Hartley Leroy Alleyne (born 28 February 1957) is a former Barbadian first-class cricketer. A right-handed batsman and right-arm fast bowler, he played for Barbados, Worcestershire, Kent and Natal between 1978–79 and 1989–90. He also played club cricket in the Lancashire League, Huddersfield League and the Birmingham League.

Alleyne was born at Derricks, St James in 1957.

== Career ==
Alleyne made his List A debut on 20 March 1979 in a Geddes Grant/Harrison Line Trophy match against the Leeward Islands, claiming the wicket of Test cricketer Derick Parry. Three days later he made his first-class debut against Combined Islands in the Shell Shield, picking up a wicket in each innings. He made no further first-class appearances that season, but did play two more Geddes Grant/Harrison Line Trophy games.

Alleyne had played one Minor Counties Championship match in England in 1979, for Lincolnshire against Norfolk, and in 1980 he began to play county cricket for Worcestershire, where he remained for three seasons. He had a fine 1980, capturing 64 first-class wickets at 25.06 and 31 List A wickets at 18.12, as well as scoring what was to be his only first-class half-century – 72 against Lancashire in the only first-class match ever played at Stourport-on-Severn. It was thus little surprise when he was awarded his county cap in 1981, in which year he took a career-best 8–43 against Middlesex. However, in general he failed to reach the same standards as in 1980, and he left the county after the 1982 season.

For the next couple of years, Alleyne divided his time between Barbados, Haslingden in the Lancashire League and St Kilda in the Victorian Premier League, as well as traveling with a West Indies XI for a non-Test tour of India. He was banned from international cricket after he joined the rebel tour to South Africa in 1983-84, defying the international sporting boycott of the apartheid state. He also played for Buckinghamshire in 1984 and 1985. In 1984/85 he joined Natal, for whom he took 56 first-class and 65 List A wickets in his six seasons there.

His second stint in county cricket, with Kent, came in 1988 and 1989, and although he played only nine first-class matches for the county (taking 21 wickets) he did appear 16 times in the one-day game (taking 22). His final first-class outing was for Natal in the Currie Cup against Western Province in October 1989. After that, he played on in the Lancashire League for a couple of seasons, this time for the Colne club.

He then became a cricket coach at first Birkenhead Boys School on the Wirral between 2003 and 2006 then St. Edmund's School in Canterbury, Kent, but in 2007 was refused a work permit by the Home Office and threatened with deportation despite having obtained the requested NVQ level 3 in sports coaching. His local MP, Julian Brazier, called the decision "utter madness". However, in January 2008 Alleyne was granted leave to remain in the UK for three years, and said that it felt "like winning the Lotto".

== Sources ==
- Woodward, I. (2009) Sam Morris: Cricket's Capital All-Rounder, Woodward Pty Ltd.: Melbourne.
