= David Emslie =

South African cricketer (born 1955)

Personal information
- Born: 19 April 1955 (age 71); Grahamstown, South Africa
- Source: Cricinfo, 17 December 2020

David Emslie (born 19 April 1955) is a South African former cricketer. He played in 44 first-class and two List A matches for Eastern Province from 1979/80 to 1987/88.

Following his playing career, Emslie was CEO of Eastern Province Cricket from 1994 to 2013.

== See also ==
- List of Eastern Province representative cricketers
