= Herbert Chang =

West Indian cricketer (born 1952)

Personal information
- Full name: Herbert Samuel Chang
- Born: 2 July 1952 (age 74); Kingston, Jamaica
- Batting: Left-handed
- Bowling: Right-arm medium
- Role: Batsman

International information
- National side: West Indies
- Only Test (cap 173): 12 January 1979 v India

Domestic team information
- Years: Team
- 1972/73–1982/83: Jamaica

Career statistics
Competition	Test	FC	LA
Matches	1	58	25
Runs scored	8	3273	480
Batting average	4.00	35.19	20.00
100s/50s	0/0	5/21	0/1
Top score	6	155	55
Balls bowled	–	42	4
Wickets	–	0	0
Bowling average	–	–	–
5 wickets in innings	–	–	–
10 wickets in match	–	–	–
Best bowling	–	–	–
Catches/stumpings	0/–	31/–	8/–
- Source: Cricket Archive, 23 April 2012

Herbert Samuel Chang (born 2 July 1952) is a former West Indian cricketer who played in one Test match in 1979.

Born in Jamaica of Chinese extraction, Chang was a diminutive left-handed batsman who toured England with the West Indies Young Cricketers in 1970 before playing 48 first-class matches and 18 List A matches for Jamaica between 1973 and 1983. He earned his first and only Test cap for the West Indies against India at Madras in January 1979, becoming the second player of Chinese descent to represent the West Indies.

Chang participated in the first West Indies rebel tour of apartheid South Africa in 1983, playing in four unofficial One Day Internationals. He was subsequently banned for life by the West Indies Cricket Board, although the ban was lifted in 1989.

Following his ostracism from cricket in the West Indies, he suffered a nervous breakdown, and today lives with family in Kingston.
