= Richard Austin (cricketer) =

Jamaican cricketer (1954-2015)

Personal information
- Full name: Richard Arkwright Austin
- Born: 5 September 1954; Kingston, Jamaica
- Died: 7 February 2015 (aged 60)
- Batting: Right-handed
- Bowling: Right-arm off break Right-arm medium pace
- Role: All-rounder

International information
- National side: West Indies
- Test debut (cap 162): 3 March 1978 v Australia
- Last Test: 17 March 1978 v Australia
- Only ODI (cap 22): 22 February 1978 v Australia

Domestic team information
- Years: Team
- 1974–1982: Jamaica

Career statistics
Competition	Tests	ODIs	FC	LA
Matches	2	1	38	22
Runs scored	22	8	2,097	385
Batting average	11.00	8.00	33.82	18.33
100s/50s	0/0	0/0	4/14	1/0
Top score	20	8	141	124*
Balls bowled	6	6	5,053	846
Wickets	0	0	73	23
Bowling average	–	–	31.21	23.26
5 wickets in innings	0	–	3	1
10 wickets in match	0	–	2	0
Best bowling	0/5	0/13	8/71	5/37
Catches/stumpings	2/–	0/–	27/–	8/–
- Source: Cricket Archive, 17 October 2010

Richard Arkwright Austin (5 September 1954 – 7 February 2015) was an international cricketer from Jamaica, who played two Tests and one One Day International for the West Indies.

Born in Kingston, Jamaica, Austin was a multi-talented sportsman, being "a footballer and table tennis player of note" on top of his cricketing skills. He represented the Jamaica Under-19s before making his first-class cricket debut for Jamaica on 21 March 1975 against Trinidad and Tobago at Jarrett Park, Montego Bay, making 0 and 74 and taking three wickets for 34 runs (3/34).

Austin made his List A cricket debut for Jamaica on 22 February 1976 against Barbados at Kensington Oval, Bridgetown, Barbados, opening the batting and scoring three, and taking 0/7 from two overs.

Some good form by Austin saw him come into contention for a place in the strong West Indies Test side. He also accepted an offer in 1977 to join World Series Cricket, a private cricket competition run by Kerry Packer. In March 1978, when an Australian side – minus its WSC players – toured the West Indies, Austin was included in the squad for the first two Tests of the series. He was originally chosen for the third Test at Bourda Cricket Ground, but the WICB excluded him from the side, along with Desmond Haynes and Deryck Murray because of World series connections. This led to skipper Clive Lloyd, and the other WSC players in the West Indian side refusing to play in the Test in protest.

Following his WSC stint from 1977 to 1979, Austin believed that he would not make the West Indian side again, and so joined the Rebel West Indies team that twice toured South Africa – during apartheid – in 1982 and 1984, under the leadership of Lawrence Rowe. Rowe apologised on 20 June 2011, to the cricketing fraternity of Jamaica, the Caribbean and the rest of the world on behalf of that ill-fated team.

This led to the ostracism of almost all members of that squad by the people of the Caribbean countries, and for some this was very severe. A number found it difficult to deal with, particularly those who could not easily leave their Caribbean communities, and the lives of a few of the players completely disintegrated when they found alternative work difficult to obtain. This was particularly the case with Austin, and following his retirement from cricket, he became reliant on alcohol and drugs to help him deal with the issue, and ultimately became homeless. He died aged 60. His death was announced on 7 February 2015.

Austin also played in the Lancashire League for Church Cricket Club in 1978 and Enfield Cricket Club in 1982.

== Sources ==
- Robinson, R. (1979) The Wildest Tests, Cassell Australia: Sydney. ISBN 0 7269 7375 0.
