= Lawrence Seeff =

South African cricketer (born 1959)

Cricket information
- Batting: Right-handed
- Bowling: Leg-break

Career statistics
Competition	First-class	List A
Matches	113	108
Runs scored	6,558	2,876
Batting average	34.51	26.87
100s/50s	11/36	2/17
Top score	188	142
Balls bowled	266	–
Wickets	5	–
Bowling average	29.60	–
5 wickets in innings	0	–
10 wickets in match	0	–
Best bowling	1/6	–
Catches/stumpings	90/–	37/–
- Source: CricketArchive, 12 January 2023

Lawrence Seeff (born 1 May 1959) is a former South African first-class cricketer.

He played with Western Province and Transvaal and was one of the South African Cricket Annual's Cricketers of the Year in 1981. He opened the batting for Western Province with his brother Jonathan Seeff.

Seeff, who is Jewish, played in the Maccabiah for South Africa in 1993, along with Terrence Lazard.

== See also ==
- List of select Jewish cricketers
