= Sylvester Clarke =

Barbadian cricketer (1954–1999)

Personal information
- Full name: Sylvester Theophilus Clarke
- Born: 11 December 1954; Christ Church, Barbados
- Died: 4 December 1999 (aged 44); Christ Church, Barbados
- Height: 6 ft 2 in (1.88 m)
- Batting: Right-handed
- Bowling: Right-arm fast
- Role: Bowler

International information
- National side: West Indies
- Test debut (cap 165): 31 March 1978 v Australia
- Last Test: 6 January 1982 v Australia
- ODI debut (cap 27): 12 April 1978 v Australia
- Last ODI: 27 January 1982 v Australia

Domestic team information
- Years: Team
- 1977/78–1981/82: Barbados
- 1979–1989: Surrey
- 1983/84–1985/86: Transvaal
- 1987/88: Orange Free State
- 1988/89–1989/90: Northern Transvaal

Career statistics
Competition	Test	ODI	FC	LA
Matches	11	10	238	251
Runs scored	172	60	3,269	1,294
Batting average	15.63	10.00	14.79	11.15
100s/50s	0/0	0/0	1/5	0/0
Top score	35*	20	100*	45*
Balls bowled	2,477	524	43,564	12,944
Wickets	42	13	942	367
Bowling average	27.85	18.84	19.52	18.69
5 wickets in innings	1	0	59	6
10 wickets in match	0	0	10	0
Best bowling	5/126	3/22	8/62	6/31
Catches/stumpings	2/–	4/–	146/–	66/–
- Source: Cricinfo, 15 August 2022

Sylvester Theophilus Clarke (11 December 1954 – 4 December 1999) was a Barbadian cricketer who played 11 Test matches and 10 One Day Internationals for the West Indian cricket team.

== Early life ==
Born in Christ Church, Barbados, to Ashton and Marjorie, Clarke attended St Bartholomew's Boys' School. A tall, strong, barrel-chested and powerfully built man (he weighed 15 stones – 210 lbs – during his international career), Clarke was born to be an intimidating fast bowler and commenced his cricketing career with Bridgetown club side, Kent. He made his first-class debut for Barbados on 19 January 1978 against Combined Islands and finished the season with 22 wickets at 25.18, highlighted by a return of 6/39, including a hat trick, against Trinidad and Tobago.

== Test career ==
The right-armer, bowling late in-swinging deliveries at very high pace and having developed an extremely fearsome bouncer, soon became one of the most feared and respected bowlers in the West Indies and, following the defection of many of the West Indian team to World Series Cricket, Clarke made his full Test debut at Bourda Cricket Ground in Georgetown, Guyana, against the touring Australian team on 31 March 1978. Clarke took 6/141 in a convincing debut, before injuring an ankle which kept him out of the rest of the series.

Nicknamed "Sly" or "Silvers", Clarke was subsequently selected for the West Indies' tour of India in 1978–79, taking 21 wickets at 33.85, including his Test best figures of 5/126 in the 2nd Test at M. Chinnaswamy Stadium, Bangalore. He then toured Pakistan in 1980–81 where he took 14 Test wickets at 17.28 before gaining his first taste of controversy. During the 4th Test at Multan, Clarke was pelted with oranges and stones by spectators whilst fielding on the boundary. Enraged, he responded by picking up a nearby brick and hurling it into the crowd, badly injuring a spectator who later required emergency surgery to his head. A near crowd riot was averted only when Clarke's teammate Alvin Kallicharan got down on bended knee to apologise directly to the crowd. Reflecting wryly on the incident many years later, Phil Edmonds commented that the brick "probably swung late and viciously before hitting him on the head."

Clarke was subsequently suspended for three matches from the team for his actions. Having already been selected ahead of Michael Holding to face Ian Botham's England side, Clarke was now forced to drop out of the squad.

Returning from suspension, Clarke found himself out of favour with the selectors and unable to break back into an already extremely strong West Indian bowling line-up boasting such talents as Joel Garner, Michael Holding, Malcolm Marshall and Colin Croft. He played only one more Test, against Australia at the Sydney Cricket Ground in January 1982.

== Rebel tour to South Africa ==
With limited international opportunities for him in the West Indies, Clarke decided to accept a lucrative offer to tour the apartheid era South Africa in 1983 and 1984 with an unofficial rebel West Indian side led by Lawrence Rowe. As a result, Clarke, together with the other members of the touring party, was banned by the West Indies Cricket Board from playing in all cricket under its jurisdiction.

Clarke was a stand-out contributor for the West Indian side in South Africa, taking 37 wickets in the unofficial Test series at 16.16 and 20 wickets at 18.45 in the accompanying limited overs series. South African provincial side Transvaal recruited Clarke and in 1984/85, he took a Currie Cup record 58 wickets at 12.72. He continued to play in South Africa until 1989, representing, at different times, Transvaal, Northern Transvaal and Orange Free State. In all, Clarke took 193 first-class wickets in South Africa at 17.55 and was named a South African Cricket Annual Cricketer of the Year in 1984 and 1985.

== English County cricket ==
Clarke played with great distinction for English county side Surrey for a decade starting in 1979, becoming one of the leading wicket takers in the County Championship. Clarke received his county cap in 1980 and his benefit year in 1987. In 1988 he took 63 wickets for Surrey at 14.50 while he also displayed his powerful and adventurous batting prowess, scoring a century (out of an 8th-wicket partnership of 151 with Jack Richards) from only 61 balls in 1981 (and winning the Walter Lawrence Trophy in the process). In 1982 he helped Surrey to win the NatWest Trophy, taking 4/10 in 7 overs and winning the man of the match award in the semi-final against County Champions elect Middlesex, taking all of the first four wickets to fall. He also took 2/17 in 11.2 overs in the final against Warwickshire.

== Later life ==
Clarke retired from first-class cricket in 1990 with 942 wickets at 19.52, including three hat-tricks. Returning to Barbados, he continued to play club cricket in Bridgetown and served as a net bowler for touring national sides, proving as dangerous as anything the touring team had faced all tour. He worked as a carpenter.

== Death ==
In November 1999 Clarke complained of feeling unwell and losing weight rapidly and saw a doctor, who could find nothing amiss. On 4 December, Clarke collapsed at his home and died suddenly of a heart attack. His death was exactly a month after fellow countryman Malcolm Marshall's death from colon cancer. Clarke died one week short of his 45th birthday; he left his wife Peggy, son Shakeem and four daughters: Sasha, Desiree, Dawn and Shelly.

== Reputation ==
Whilst his Test bowling figures are not exceptional, and he was one of several particularly fast West Indies' bowlers at the time, Clarke nevertheless gained a reputation amongst his fellow players as the most intimidating and feared fast bowler of his generation. In his obituary in The Guardian, it was written "like the Jamaican Roy Gilchrist in the 1950s, and his fellow Bajan, Charlie Griffith, in the 1960s, Clarke's weaponry was based more on sheer menace than technical accomplishment. He induced fear and self-doubt in even the best batsmen." Viv Richards claimed Clarke was the only bowler he did not feel comfortable batting against, David Gower stated that Clarke was by far the fastest man he ever faced, Geoff Boycott said Clarke "scared me silly", and in the mid-1980s Garry Sobers wrote that Clarke was "the quickest and most hostile fast bowler now playing in world cricket".

A truer indication of Clarke's ability perhaps lies in his first class figures. In his nine seasons with Surrey, Clarke took 591 wickets at an average of 18.99; his 193 wickets in South Africa's Currie Cup came at an average of just over 20. His overall first class figures of 942 wickets at 19.52, including three hat-tricks, is a statistic not matched by many other bowlers.

Clarke was not shy of delivering balls patently designed to scare opposing batsmen and make them look foolish, and was regularly capable of a perfect bouncer, which having pitched then cut away sharply to follow the path of a batsman's head as he swayed away from it. Having duly terrified the batsman, Clarke would often follow this up with a wicket-taking high speed yorker, which the shaken-up batsman was in no condition to defend. Alan Kourie recalls that Clarke, during the unofficial West Indies 1983 rebel tour, recorded speeds between 98 mph and 101 mph by two South African police officers testing out a new automobile speed radar gun who were present at Johannesburg ground.

Though a popular, affable and laconic personality off the pitch, Clarke had a quick temper on the field and regarded the battle between batsman and bowler as a personal trial of strength and character. He was quite aware that he could be a physically intimidating man, and was unafraid of using his size and power to his advantage in overawing batsmen psychologically. Once warned by an umpire for over-use of the bouncer, he replied: "Dis no ladies game, man."

In 2021 Surrey Cricket Club opened "Sylvester's Bar" at the Oval, named for Clarke.

== Books ==
- Sobers, G. (1988) Sobers: Twenty Years at the Top, MacMillan London, Ltd, ISBN 0-330-30868-8.
- Sproat, I. (1988) The Cricketers' Who's Who 1988, Willow Books: London. ISBN 0 00 218285 8.
