= Brian Whitfield =

South African cricketer (born 1959)

Personal information
- Born: 14 March 1959 (age 67); Durban, South Africa
- Batting: Left-handed
- Bowling: Slow left-arm orthodox

Career statistics
Competition	First-class	List A
Matches	83	62
Runs scored	5,166	1,403
Batting average	38.26	28.06
100s/50s	11/33	2/6
Top score	161	109*
Balls bowled	48	–
Wickets	0	–
Bowling average	–	–
5 wickets in innings	–	–
10 wickets in match	–	–
Best bowling	–	–
Catches/stumpings	58/1	21/0
- Source: CricketArchive

Brian Jonathan Whitfield (born 14 March 1959) is a former South African First-class cricketer.

He played with Natal and Northern Transvaal and was one of the South African Cricket Annual's Cricketers of the Year in 1987.
