= Monte Lynch =

English cricketer (born 1958)

Cricket information
- Batting: Right-handed
- Bowling: Right-arm medium; Right-arm off-spin

International information
- National side: England
- ODI debut (cap 99): 19 May 1988 v West Indies
- Last ODI: 23 May 1988 v West Indies

Domestic team information
- Years: Team
- 1977–1994: Surrey
- 1982/83: Guyana
- 1995–1998: Gloucestershire

Career statistics
Competition	ODI	FC	LA
Matches	3	359	378
Runs scored	8	18,325	8,483
Batting average	2.66	35.17	27.72
100s/50s	0/0	39/88	7/47
Top score	6	172*	136
Balls bowled	–	2,195	729
Wickets	–	26	20
Bowling average	–	53.76	29.60
5 wickets in innings	–	0	0
10 wickets in match	–	0	0
Best bowling	–	3/6	3/41
Catches/stumpings	1/–	367/–	146/–
- Source: ESPN Cricinfo, 12 February 2006

Monte Alan Lynch (born 21 May 1958) is a Guyanese-born English cricketer. His family emigrated to England when he was a child. He played in three One Day Internationals for England and in 359 first-class matches.

Lynch was a hard-hitting batsman, an occasional off-spin bowler and a fine slip fielder. Lynch played in the County Championship for Surrey between 1977 and 1994, and for Gloucestershire from 1995 to 1998.

Lynch played one season for Guyana in the 1982–83 Shell Shield 4-day competition. He also played for the unofficial West Indies team on their second rebel tour of South Africa the following season. His position was an interesting one: he could have been eligible to play for either West Indies (by birth) or England (by residence) in official teams, but taking part in this rebel tour saw him and all the rest of the tour party banned by West Indies for life. England, by contrast, only banned their own South African tourists for three years as a standard measure. Since the touring teams were not "official" international teams, this also did not disqualify him from playing for England, nor force him to serve a residential qualification period after playing his last match for the West Indies since he was not considered as having truly played for the West Indies at all.

Monte Lynch was picked for England and played in three One Day Internationals versus the West Indies in 1988 - more than three years after his rebel tour, and thus in compliance with England's standard three-year ban for rebel tourists: but after scores of 0 (run out without facing a ball at the non-striker's end), 2 and 6 he was not picked again. West Indies did not raise any complaint at his being selected for England, whose team in any case contained a few other players that had toured South Africa and served 3-year international bans for it (such as Gooch and Emburey, both of whom were to captain England later in the summer).

Since retiring from first-class cricket he has continued to play club cricket in Surrey and started his own sporting goods company, MAL Skills. He was the cricket coach at the Royal Grammar School, Guildford, and then the coach of the Southern Rocks cricket team in Zimbabwe.
