= Denys Hobson =

South African cricketer (born 1951)

Personal information
- Born: 3 September 1951; Port Elizabeth, Cape Province
- Died: 21 November 2025 (aged 74); Cape Town, Cape Province
- Batting: Right-handed
- Bowling: Right-arm legbreak, googly

Domestic team information
- Years: Team
- 1970/71–1984/85: Eastern Province

Career statistics
Competition	First-class	List A
Matches	105	18
Runs scored	1,251	105
Batting average	13.30	13.12
100s/50s	0/2	0/0
Top score	61	27*
Balls bowled	22,119	875
Wickets	374	17
Bowling average	27.52	26.35
5 wickets in innings	22	1
10 wickets in match	6	0
Best bowling	9/64	7/27
Catches/stumpings	47/–	3/–
- Source: CricInfo, 18 January 2020

Denys Laurence Hobson (3 September 1951 – 21 November 2025) was a South African first-class cricketer. Hobson played as a right-handed batsman and legbreak bowler for Eastern Province and Western Province. His career lasted from 1970–71 to 1984–85. He was born at Port Elizabeth in 1951.

Educated at Kingswood College, Hobson played for Eastern Province in the Nuffield week from 1970 to 1971. He represented South African schools in 1971. He furthered his studies at Rhodes University and played for South African Universities in 1972 and 1973.

Regarded by many as South Africa's best legbreak bowler, before, during and after the years of isolation, he was invited to play in World Series Cricket in Australia in 1977. Because he was an amateur player, for political reasons he was not allowed to play. Graeme Pollock who joined Hobson on this trip, suffered the same fate. Hobson played in 105 first-class matches, taking 374 wickets at an average of 27.52. He maintained a strike rate of 59.1 balls per wicket. In 90 Currie Cup matches he took 319 wickets.

He played for South Africa in four unofficial "Tests" during the Apartheid years and was South African Cricketer of the Year in 1975.

His death at Cape Town on 21 November 2025 was announced on the Kingswood College website.
