= Everton Mattis =

Jamaican cricketer (born 1957)

Personal information
- Full name: Everton Hugh Mattis
- Born: 11 April 1957 (age 69); Kingston, Jamaica
- Batting: Right-handed
- Bowling: Right-arm off break

International information
- National side: West Indies
- Test debut (cap 175): 13 February 1981 v England
- Last Test: 10 April 1981 v England
- ODI debut (cap 35): 4 February 1981 v England
- Last ODI: 26 February 1981 v England

Domestic team information
- Years: Team
- 1976–1982: Jamaica

Career statistics
Competition	Tests	ODIs	FC	LA
Matches	4	2	38	26
Runs scored	145	86	2,064	439
Batting average	29.00	43.00	33.29	18.29
100s/50s	0/1	0/1	3/12	0/2
Top score	71	62	132	67
Balls bowled	36	0	307	84
Wickets	0	–	9	4
Bowling average	–	–	9.88	14.75
5 wickets in innings	0	–	0	0
10 wickets in match	0	–	0	0
Best bowling	0/4	–	4/22	2/46
Catches/stumpings	3/–	2/–	25/–	9/–
- Source: CricketArchive (subscription required), 18 October 2010

Everton Hugh Mattis (born 11 April 1957) is a former West Indian cricketer who played in four Tests and two ODIs in 1981. In his maiden ODI, he scored a gritty 62 against England at Kingstown, St. Vincent. In the same match, West Indian pacer Collin Croft demolished the Englishmen with a figure of 9-4-15-6 to help the West Indies to defend the total of 127 and to win the match by 2 runs.

Mattis' international career came to an end after he joined the rebel tours to South Africa in 1982-83 and 1983-84, defying the international sporting boycott of the apartheid state.
