= Kenny Watson (cricketer) =

South African cricketer (born 1955)

William Kenneth ("Kenny") Watson (born 21 May 1955 in Port Elizabeth) is a South African former first-class cricketer active 1974–92 who played for Border and Nottinghamshire. Watson played in 143 first-class and 147 List A matches during his career.
