= Alan Kourie =

South African cricketer (born 1951)

Alan John Kourie (born 30 July 1951 in Johannesburg) is a former South African first class cricketer, who played for Transvaal, from 1970–71 to 1988–89. Educated at Jeppe Boys High, he played for Transvaal in the Nuffield week, and for South African schools in 1970.

An all-rounder, he was a slow left-arm orthodox bowler and right-handed batsman. Kourie played a 127 first class matches, taking 421 wickets at an average of 23.44. He also scored 4470 runs, including 5 centuries, at an average of 34.38. In Currie Cup cricket, he played 107 matches, taking 378 wickets at 22.12 a piece, scoring 3962 runs at an average of 37.02.

Kourie played for South Africa in 16 unofficial "Tests" and was player of the year in 1980. He also received a special tribute in the S.A. Cricket Annual in 1987.
