= Alvin Greenidge =

West Indian cricketer (born 1956)

Personal information
- Full name: Alvin Ethelbert Greenidge
- Born: 20 August 1956 (age 70); Bath Village, Christ Church, Barbados
- Batting: Right-handed
- Bowling: Right-arm medium pace

International information
- National side: West Indies
- Test debut (cap 166): 31 March 1978 v Australia
- Last Test: 2 February 1979 v India
- Only ODI (cap 29): 12 April 1978 v Australia

Domestic team information
- Years: Team
- 1974–1982: Barbados

Career statistics
Competition	Tests	ODIs	FC	LA
Matches	6	1	48	29
Runs scored	222	23	2,319	610
Batting average	22.20	23.00	30.51	23.46
100s/50s	0/2	0/0	4/8	0/3
Top score	69	23	172	75*
Balls bowled	0	0	285	60
Wickets	–	–	5	1
Bowling average	–	–	29.40	37.00
5 wickets in innings	–	–	0	0
10 wickets in match	–	–	0	0
Best bowling	–	–	2/52	1/27
Catches/stumpings	5/–	0/–	32/–	7/–
- Source: Cricket Archive, 18 October 2010

Alvin Ethelbert Greenidge (born 20 August 1956) is a former West Indian cricketer who played in six Tests and one ODI from 1978 to 1979. Born in Barbados, he was an opening batsman who shares his name with, but is unrelated to, fellow opener Gordon Greenidge. He was selected to play for the West Indies when the side was depleted by the defection of players to the breakaway World Series Cricket. Their return after WSC ended, as well as his participation in the tour of South Africa in 1982–83 signified the end for Alvin's international career. His best score of 69 in Tests, and one of his two Test half-centuries, came against Australia in 1977–78.
