= Rupert Hanley =

South African cricketer (born 1952)

Cricket information
- Batting: Right-handed
- Bowling: Right-arm fast

Career statistics
Competition	First-class	List A
Matches	113	72
Runs scored	320	35
Batting average	5.81	4.37
100s/50s	0/0	0/0
Top score	33*	6*
Balls bowled	19,550	4,013
Wickets	408	83
Bowling average	20.81	29.60
5 wickets in innings	23	1
10 wickets in match	3	0
Best bowling	7/31	6/22
Catches/stumpings	39/–	7/–
- Source: Cricinfo, 15 November 2022

Rupert William Hanley (born 29 January 1952) is a former South African first class cricketer.

Due to his long blond hair, Hanley was known as Spook, Afrikaans for ghost. Hanley was a fast medium bowler whose career coincided with South Africa's ban on international cricket. In 1974 he played for the Derek Robins XI (along with fellow South Africans Barry Richards, Tich Smith, Peter Swart and Clive Rice) in England against Pakistan, taking 5/52 in the first innings. In South Africa, Hanley played for various Currie Cup teams from 1971 to 1986, including the dominant Transvaal "Mean Machine" of the 1980s. He played for South Africa in two unofficial "Tests" and 6 limited overs matches against the touring West Indian side in 1984, taking a hat-trick at the Wanderers Stadium and 14 wickets in total.

In England he played for Northamptonshire during the 1984 season, representing the county against the West Indies, and taking 3/27 in the first innings. David Doyle, a peer of Graeme Pollock and one of South Africa's premier batsmen of the era rated Hanley one of the greatest bowlers he faced.

Hanley has the unusual distinction of having taken more wickets than he scored runs (in both first class and List A) over his career.

Hanley is also an accomplished artist.
