= Emmerson Trotman =

West Indies cricketer (born 1954)

Personal information
- Full name: Emmerson Nathaniel Trotman
- Born: 10 November 1954 (age 72); Paradise Village, Christ Church, Barbados
- Batting: Right-handed
- Bowling: Right-arm medium
- Role: All-rounder

Domestic team information
- Years: Team
- 1975/76–1981/82: Barbados

Head coaching information
- Years: Team
- 1996–2005: Netherlands

Career statistics
Competition	First-class	List A
Matches	76	87
Runs scored	4495	1729
Batting average	37.77	23.36
100s/50s	9/27	1/10
Top score	173	100*
Balls bowled	2209	532
Wickets	34	12
Bowling average	33.91	28.41
5 wickets in innings	1	–
10 wickets in match	–	–
Best bowling	5/30	3/11
Catches/stumpings	96/15	43/4
- Source: , 5 May 2020

Emmerson Nathaniel Trotman (born 10 November 1954) is a former West Indies cricketer who played in the role of an allrounder. Trotman featured as right handed batsman for Barbados, the West Indies rebels and Border in his cricketing career. He later served as the head coach of the Netherlands as well as Barbados.

He is the father of footballer Ryan Trotman.

== Playing career ==
Born in Paradise Village, Christ Church, Barbados, Trotman played for Barbados from 1976 to 1983. He then joined the West Indies rebels, playing on their tours to South Africa. Due to the West Indies Cricket Board banning those said cricketers, Trotman's playing days for Barbados thus came to and end. He soon joined up with South African side Border and 1989 he was named as a South African Cricket Annual Cricketer of the Year. Trotman eventually featured for Border for a sum of eight seasons.

== Coaching career ==
When his playing days came to a close Trotman became involved in coaching. He went on to obtain a Level 3 coaching certificate from Cricket South Africa along with a Level 4 coaching certificate from the England and Wales Cricket Board. During 1996 he was appointed head coach of the Netherlands. With him at the helm, the Dutch won the 1998 European Cricket Championship and the 2001 ICC Trophy. They also qualified for the 2002 ICC Champions Trophy and the 2003 World Cup. After eight years with the Dutch, Trotman eventually left the role in June 2005.
