= David Murray (cricketer) =

West Indian cricketer (1950–2022)

Personal information
- Full name: David Anthony Murray
- Born: 29 May 1950; Bridgetown, Colony of Barbados
- Died: 26 November 2022 (aged 72); Station Hill, St. Michael Barbados
- Batting: Right-handed
- Bowling: Leg break
- Role: Wicket-keeper
- Relatives: Sir Everton Weekes (father); Ricky Hoyte (son)

International information
- National side: West Indies
- Test debut (cap 167): 31 March 1978 v Australia
- Last Test: 2 January 1982 v Australia
- ODI debut (cap 13): 7 September 1973 v England
- Last ODI: 5 December 1981 v Pakistan

Domestic team information
- Years: Team
- 1970–1982: Barbados

Career statistics
Competition	Tests	ODIs	FC	LA
Matches	19	10	114	50
Runs scored	601	45	4,503	627
Batting average	21.46	9.00	30.84	24.11
100s/50s	0/3	0/0	7/19	0/4
Top score	84	35	206*	78
Catches/stumpings	57/5	16/0	293/30	68/3
- Source: Cricket Archive, 17 October 2010

David Anthony Murray (29 May 1950 – 26 November 2022) was a West Indian and Barbadian cricketer who played in nineteen Tests and ten ODIs from 1973 to 1982 as a wicket-keeper.

Murray, a son of the West Indian batsman Sir Everton Weekes, often courted controversy. A marijuana user from a young age, he was almost thrown out of the 1975–76 tour to Australia, only saved by the intervention of the sympathetic senior player Lance Gibbs. His drug habit was reportedly fuelled by a tour of India where he found drugs easily available: "A waiter at the team hotel started the whole thing. There was a market there, near the Gateway of India, where you used to get anything, good African marijuana, everything... it's a great place." By 1978, he had moved on to cocaine.

Murray spent most of his international career as understudy to his Trinidadian counterpart Deryck Murray, and was usurped in 1981 by Jeff Dujon of Jamaica. Frustrated at his lack of opportunities, he joined the West Indian rebel tours to South Africa in 1983 and received a lifetime ban.

Murray lived in poverty at his childhood home in Bridgetown. On 26 November 2022, Murray collapsed and died near his home in Station Hill, St. Michael, at the age of 72.

Murray's son, Ricky Hoyte, was also a wicket-keeper, playing for Barbados in the 1990s.
