= Robert Bentley (cricketer) =

South African cricketer

Personal information
- Full name: Robert Mulock Bentley
- Born: 3 November 1958 (age 68); Bindura, Mashonaland, Rhodesia
- Batting: Left-handed
- Bowling: Right-arm off-break
- Role: Batsman

Domestic team information
- Years: Team
- 1978/79: Rhodesia
- 1979/80: Zimbabwe-Rhodesia
- 1980/81–1991/92: Natal

Career statistics
Competition	First-class	List A
Matches	98	100
Runs scored	5,091	2,455
Batting average	32.84	29.93
100s/50s	5/35	3/13
Top score	151	112
Balls bowled	6,818	1,158
Wickets	91	26
Bowling average	33.04	34.61
5 wickets in innings	0	0
10 wickets in match	0	0
Best bowling	4/33	3/20
Catches/stumpings	47/–	21/–
- Source: CricketArchive, 15 August 2022

Robert Mulock Bentley (born 3 November 1958) is a former first-class cricketer who played for both his native Rhodesia and Natal in the Currie Cup.

Bentley lined up for Rhodesia for the first time in the 1978/79 Currie Cup. In the following season's campaign the team was renamed Zimbabwe-Rhodesia before the county became fully independent in 1980. Later that year he represented Zimbabwe in two first-class matches against Middlesex who were touring the country. While many of his teammates went on to play One Day International cricket for Zimbabwe, Bentley instead moved to South Africa and joined Natal. He was a regular batsman in the middle order at Natal, often at three, throughout the 1980s and early 1990s.

After spending the 1982 English summer as a professional at Lancashire League club Haslingden, Bentley returned to South Africa and had his most prolific season with 639 runs at 45.64.

Also a capable off spin bowler, his first-class wickets include Graeme Pollock, Kepler Wessels, Peter Kirsten and Allan Lamb.
