= Robert Armitage (cricketer) =

South African cricketer (1955–2000)

Personal information
- Full name: Robert Lawrence Sugden Armitage
- Born: 9 July 1955; Grahamstown, Cape Province, South Africa
- Died: 9 December 2000 (aged 45); Grahamstown, Eastern Cape, South Africa
- Batting: Left-handed
- Bowling: Right-arm off break

Domestic team information
- Years: Team
- 1973/74–1987/88: Eastern Province
- 1976/77–1977/78: Northern Transvaal
- 1979/80–1987/88: Eastern Province B
- 1980: Cambridgeshire

Career statistics
Competition	First-class	List A
Matches	109	55
Runs scored	3,923	969
Batting average	23.21	25.50
100s/50s	4/15	–/5
Top score	171*	73
Balls bowled	14,749	1,466
Wickets	205	35
Bowling average	31.65	27.20
5 wickets in innings	7	–
10 wickets in match	1	–
Best bowling	7/97	4/18
Catches/stumpings	47/–	15/–
- Source: Cricinfo, 21 July 2019

Robert Lawrence Sugden Armitage (9 July 1955 – 9 December 2000) was a South African first-class cricketer.

== Life and career ==
Armitage was born in Grahamstown in July 1955 and later studied at Rhodes University. He made his debut in first-class cricket for Eastern Province against Transvaal at The Wanderers in the 1973–74 Currie Cup. He made 109 appearances in first-class cricket until 1987–88 Castle Bowl, making ninety appearances for Eastern Province, nine appearances for Eastern Province B, six appearances for Northern Transvaal, and four appearances for South African Universities. Playing as an all-rounder, he scored 3,923 runs in first-class cricket, 3,376 of which came for Eastern Province at an average of 24.11 and a high score of 171 not out. Making four centuries and thirteen half centuries, his highest first-class score came against Northern Transvaal in the 1981–82 season. With his right-arm off break bowling, he took 205 wickets, 143 of which came for Eastern Province at a bowling average of 35.84 and best figures of 7 for 97. He took seven five wicket hauls, with his best figures coming against Transvaal in the 1975–76 season.

He made his debut in List A one-day cricket for Eastern Province against Border in the 1974–75 Gillette Cup. He played List A cricket until November 1987, making 55 appearances. These included 51 matches for Eastern Province, in addition to one match for Northern Transvaal and three matches for South Africa, at a time when South Africa was suspended from international cricket as a result of apartheid. He scored 969 runs at an average of 25.50 in his 55 List A matches, with a high score of 73. With the ball, he took 35 wickets at an average of 27.20, with best figures of 4 for 18. He was a South African cricketer of the year in 1982.

In addition to playing first-class and List A cricket, he also played minor counties cricket in England for Cambridgeshire in 1980, making eight appearances in the Minor Counties Championship. He died in Grahamstown in December 2000, following a long struggle with cancer.
