= Stuart Ishmael =

West Indian cricket umpire

Umpiring information
- Tests umpired: 2 (1971–1974)
- Source: Cricinfo, 7 July 2013

Stuart Ishmael is a former West Indian cricket umpire. He stood in two Test matches between 1971 and 1974.

== See also ==
- List of Test cricket umpires
