= Ezra Moseley =

West Indian cricketer (1958–2021)

Personal information
- Full name: Ezra Alphonsa Moseley
- Born: 5 January 1958; Christ Church, Barbados
- Died: 6 February 2021 (aged 63); Christ Church, Barbados
- Batting: Right-handed
- Bowling: Right-arm fast-medium

International information
- National side: West Indies (1990–1991)
- Test debut (cap 195): 23 March 1990 v England
- Last Test: 5 April 1990 v England
- ODI debut (cap 57): 14 February 1990 v England
- Last ODI: 9 March 1991 v Australia

Domestic team information
- Years: Team
- 1980–1986: Glamorgan
- 1981/82–1991/92: Barbados
- 1983/84–1984/85: Eastern Province
- 1991/92: Northern Transvaal

Career statistics
Competition	Test	ODI	FC	LA
Matches	2	9	76	83
Runs scored	35	7	1,431	389
Batting average	8.75	1.75	17.45	9.48
100s/50s	0/0	0/0	0/4	0/1
Top score	26	2*	70*	63*
Balls bowled	522	330	13,555	3,977
Wickets	6	7	279	106
Bowling average	43.50	39.71	23.31	23.26
5 wickets in innings	0	0	11	0
10 wickets in match	0	0	1	0
Best bowling	2/70	2/52	6/23	4/8
Catches/stumpings	1/–	0/–	21/–	13/–
- Source: CricketArchive, 20 October 2010

Ezra Alphonsa Moseley (5 January 1958 – 6 February 2021) was a Barbadian cricketer who played in two Test matches and nine One Day Internationals for the West Indies cricket team in 1990 and 1991. He was the only member of the 1982 rebel tour to South Africa to subsequently play for the West Indies after their bans were rescinded. He notably broke Graham Gooch's hand during England's 1989–90 tour of the West Indies.

== Early life ==
Moseley was born in Waldrons Village, Christ Church, Barbados, on 5 January 1958. He played club cricket in his home country until 1980, when Glamorgan signed him based on his impressive performances.

== Career ==
Moseley was recommended to Welsh county club Glamorgan by Trevor Bailey and Reg Simpson and made his First Class debut in 1980, taking over a hundred wickets for Glamorgan in his first two seasons as well as receiving his county cap, before debuting for Barbados in 1981.

Although viewed as a hot prospect early in his career, a stress fracture of his back required surgery and a lengthy period of rehabilitation. Moseley signed on for the controversial West Indies "rebel tour" of South Africa in 1982, earning him a life ban from West Indies cricket. Following the tour, Moseley continued playing in South Africa for Eastern Province as well as remaining at Glamorgan until 1986, when he became a professional in the Lancashire Leagues.

The life bans on the rebel tourists were lifted in 1989, and Moseley returned to Barbados to become the first and only member of the touring parties to play for the West Indies afterwards. He played two Tests against England during their 1989–90 tour of the West Indies, in which he took six wickets, but his most significant delivery was the one that broke Graham Gooch's hand and put him out of the rest of the tour. England had been chasing a small target in search of a 2–0 series lead, which they then failed to reach before bad light intervened. Playing without Gooch, England lost the remaining two matches to lose the series 2–1. He spent a final season in South Africa playing for Northern Transvaal, before retiring in 1992. He was considered a fast medium bowler, but those who knew him closely disputed this, calling for him to be accepted as a fast bowler.

== Later life ==
After retiring from cricket, Moseley coached at The St. Michael School. There, he was instrumental in the development of Jason Holder, who went on to captain the West Indies cricket team. He also served as a selector for the men's and women's squad of the Barbados national cricket team. He was the assistant coach of the women's team when they won the 2016 ICC Women's World Twenty20.

Moseley died on 6 February 2021 in Christ Church at the age of 63. He was hit by a vehicle while cycling for exercise and died at the scene. On Monday, February 8, 2021, a day of remembrance was held at The St. Michael School to celebrate his life.
