= Derick Parry =

West Indian cricketer (born 1954)

Personal information
- Full name: Derick Recaldo Parry
- Born: 22 December 1954 (age 71); Cotton Ground, Saint Kitts and Nevis
- Batting: Right-handed
- Bowling: Right-arm off break
- Relatives: David Parry (uncle)

International information
- National side: West Indies
- Test debut (cap 164): 3 March 1978 v Australia
- Last Test: 8 February 1980 v New Zealand
- ODI debut (cap 30): 12 April 1978 v Australia
- Last ODI: 19 December 1980 v Pakistan

Domestic team information
- Years: Team
- 1975–1982: Leeward Islands
- 1976–1981: Combined Islands
- 1982–1986: Cambridgeshire

Career statistics
Competition	Tests	ODIs	FC	LA
Matches	12	6	77	36
Runs scored	381	61	2,552	336
Batting average	22.41	15.25	26.86	15.27
100s/50s	0/3	0/0	0/14	0/0
Top score	65	32	96	43
Balls bowled	1,909	330	16,080	1,722
Wickets	23	11	251	39
Bowling average	40.69	23.54	28.95	26.10
5 wickets in innings	1	0	12	1
10 wickets in match	0	0	1	0
Best bowling	5/15	3/47	9/76	5/34
Catches/stumpings	4/–	8/–	50/–	14/–
- Source: Cricket Archive, 18 October 2010

Derick Recaldo Parry (born 22 December 1954) is a former cricketer from St Kitts and Nevis who played 12 Tests and six One Day Internationals for the West Indies.

Parry was a lower-order right-handed batsman and a right-arm off-break bowler.

Parry's international career came to an end after he joined the rebel tours to South Africa in 1982–83 and 1983–84, defying the international sporting boycott of the apartheid state.

Parry spent 15 seasons between 1981 and 1996 as the professional at Horden CC in the Durham Senior League, missing only the 1992 season in this spell.
