= Albert Padmore =

West Indian cricketer (born 1944)

Personal information
- Full name: Albert Leroy Padmore
- Born: 17 December 1944 (age 81)
- Batting: Right-handed
- Bowling: Right-arm off break
- Role: Bowler

International information
- National side: West Indies
- Test debut (cap 155): 7 April 1976 v India
- Last Test: 8 July 1976 v England

Domestic team information
- Years: Team
- 1972–1984: Barbados

Career statistics
Competition	Test	FC	LA
Matches	2	68	18
Runs scored	8	562	59
Batting average	8.00	13.06	8.42
100s/50s	0/0	0/2	0/0
Top score	8*	79	23
Balls bowled	474	14,125	870
Wickets	1	193	20
Bowling average	135.00	29.94	25.90
5 wickets in innings	0	8	0
10 wickets in match	0	2	0
Best bowling	1/36	6/69	3/24
Catches/stumpings	0/–	29/–	5/–
- Source: Cricinfo, 11 April 2022

Albert Leroy Padmore (born 17 December 1944) is a former West Indies cricketer, playing two Tests in 1976 and representing the West Indies in World Series Cricket.

He was primarily an off-spin bowler, who was unfortunate in that his career coincided with the emergence of Andy Roberts, Michael Holding and others to give West Indies one of the finest fast bowling attacks in history. West Indies developed a strategy of playing four fast bowlers and relying on batsmen such as Viv Richards to bowl the few overs of spin needed. This restricted Padmore's opportunities, and he soon signed for World Series Cricket, and was subsequently banned for life when he joined a "rebel" tour to South Africa.

In 1986, Padmore moved to the United States of America and now lives in Miami.
