= Stephen Jefferies (cricketer) =

South African cricketer

Personal information
- Full name: Stephen Thomas Jefferies
- Born: 8 December 1959 (age 66); Cape Town, South Africa
- Batting: Left-handed
- Bowling: Left-arm fast-medium

Domestic team information
- Years: Team
- 1978/79–1991/92: Western Province
- 1982: Derbyshire
- 1983–1985: Lancashire
- 1988–1989: Hampshire
- 1993/94: Boland
- FC debut: 24 November 1978 Western Provinces v Eastern Province
- Last FC: 10 December 1993 Boland B v Western Province B
- LA debut: 25 October 1980 Western Province v Orange Free State
- Last LA: 12 January 1994 Boland v Transvaal

Career statistics
Competition	FC	LA
Matches	142	175
Runs scored	3,810	1,705
Batting average	25.06	21.31
100s/50s	0/14	0/2
Top score	93	74*
Balls bowled	27,416	9,243
Wickets	478	256
Bowling average	27.62	22.67
5 wickets in innings	19	2
10 wickets in match	4	0
Best bowling	10/59	5/10
Catches/stumpings	54/0	42/0
- Source: ESPNcricinfo, 29 January 2022

Stephen Thomas Jefferies (born 8 December 1959) is a former South African first-class cricketer.

== Career ==
Jefferies was a left-handed batsman and a left-arm medium-fast bowler whose career centred on his home country of South Africa, though in 1982 he briefly moved to England and played for Derbyshire. He made his debut for Derbyshire in July of that year against a team of Pakistanis, and returned to South Africa in order to be eligible to play in the SAB Currie Cup during the 1982–83 season.

Jefferies' Western Province team, which included Test players Peter Kirsten, Graham Gooch and John Emburey amongst others, drew the Currie Cup final that season, but lost on countback, having had a less successful qualifying record. Jefferies was proclaimed one of five South African Cricket Annual Cricketers of the Year in 1982.

He moved back to England in April 1983, immediately following yet another Castle Currie Cup final appearance, this time a defeat by Transvaal, in order to play for Lancashire, and, during a match in June of that year, took 8/46, the second highest individual innings total of the season, and 11/95 in the match, one of the highest match-returns.

In December 1987 he took all ten wickets in the second innings a Castle Currie Cup game for Western Province against Orange Free State, the only man to do so in that season's competition.

Jefferies returned to England for 1988, playing for Hampshire. He was signed to cover for Malcolm Marshall whose availability was limited due to international commitments. He was man of the match in the final of the 1988 Benson & Hedges Cup, taking 5/13 in ten overs. In county cricket, Hampshire finished third-bottom of the 1988 County Championship, the year's highlight being another of Jefferies' career total of four ten-wicket match hauls. He continued to play for Western Province and Hampshire until 1992. Jefferies' career concluded in 1993 when he played for Boland B in the 1993–4 UCB Bowl tournament.

Jefferies coached the Habsani Royals in the 2012 edition of the Wembley Super 8 Cricket Festival in Rylands, Cape Town.
