= Collis King =

West Indian cricketer

Personal information
- Full name: Collis Llewellyn King
- Born: 11 June 1951 (age 75); Christ Church, Barbados
- Batting: Right-handed
- Bowling: Right-arm medium
- Role: All-rounder

International information
- National side: West Indies
- Test debut (cap 158): 8 July 1976 v England
- Last Test: 7 August 1980 v England
- ODI debut (cap 19): 26 August 1976 v England
- Last ODI: 30 May 1980 v England

Domestic team information
- Years: Team
- 1973–1982: Barbados
- 1977: Glamorgan
- 1983–1985: Worcestershire
- 1984–1990: Natal

Career statistics
Competition	Test	ODI	FC	LA
Matches	9	18	125	136
Runs scored	418	280	6,770	2,738
Batting average	32.15	23.33	38.24	25.83
100s/50s	1/2	0/1	14/34	2/17
Top score	100*	86	163	127
Balls bowled	582	744	9,279	5,556
Wickets	3	11	128	108
Bowling average	94.00	48.09	34.21	34.49
5 wickets in innings	0	0	1	0
10 wickets in match	0	0	0	0
Best bowling	1/30	4/23	5/91	4/23
Catches/stumpings	5/–	6/–	98/–	41/–
Medal record
Men's Cricket
Representing West Indies
ICC Cricket World Cup
Winner	1975 England
Winner	1979 England
- Source: Cricinfo, 9 September 2011

Collis Llewellyn King (born 11 June 1951) is a former West Indies first-class cricketer who played nine Test matches and 18 One Day Internationals for the West Indies cricket team between 1976 and 1980. He was a member of the squad which won the 1975 Cricket World Cup and the 1979 Cricket World Cup.

Born in Christ Church, Barbados, King played as an all-rounder, but had more success with the bat than ball, especially in Test cricket, where he scored one century and two fifties but only took three wickets – in three different innings. In ODI cricket, his highest – and swiftest – score came in the 1979 World Cup final, when he came in at 99 for 4 to hit 86 off 66 deliveries, and added 139 with Viv Richards. King also held a catch and bowled three overs for 13 runs in the match, and the West Indies won by 92 runs.

King went on both the 1982/83 and 1983/84 West Indies' rebel tours to South Africa.

In a varied first-class career, he played for his native country Barbados in the West Indies domestic competition, and also played for Glamorgan and Worcestershire in English county cricket and Natal in South Africa. In scoring 123 on his Worcestershire debut in 1983, he became the first player in more than fifty years to score a hundred in his first match for the county.

King was still playing club cricket for Yorkshire side Dunnington CC into his sixties.

Preceded by Sarfraz Nawaz	Nelson Cricket Club; Professional; 1974–1975	Succeeded by Harold Gibson
