= Ken McEwan =

South African cricketer

Kenneth Scott McEwan (born 16 July 1952 at Bedford, South Africa), is a South African-Scottish retired cricketer and businessman who played principally for Eastern Province and Essex.

A right-handed middle-order batsman, McEwan's cricket career coincided almost exactly with the period in which South Africa was banished from international cricket because of the apartheid policies of its government. McEwan first played for Eastern Province at the age of 20, and was recommended to Sussex by the future England captain Tony Greig. But Sussex had its quota of overseas players and in 1974 McEwan went on to the staff at Essex, having played just two seasons in South African cricket and without a first-class century to his name.

It proved a good signing: McEwan scored just over 1,000 runs in his first season at an average of 30 runs per innings, and for the next 11 seasons comfortably exceeded those figures in every year. In 1977, he scored centuries in four consecutive first-class innings and the following year he was named as one of the five Wisden Cricketers of the Year in the 1978 edition of the almanack. His best season was 1983 when, with 2,051 runs at an average of 68.36, he headed the national runs tally in the season.

With McEwan as its leading batsman, Essex achieved the first successes in its history, winning the County Championship in 1979, 1983 and 1984, the Sunday League in 1981, 1984 and 1985, the Benson & Hedges Cup in 1979 and the NatWest Trophy in 1985.

Though unable to play Test cricket, McEwan returned to South Africa most winters to play for Eastern Province, but from 1979 he had two seasons in Australia with Western Australia. He retired from Essex after the 1985 season, but continued to play five more seasons for Eastern Province, during which the club won its first two Currie Cups (the latter shared with Western Province). McEwan finished his career in 1991–92 with one season for Border.

In all cricket, McEwan scored 26,628 runs at an average of more than 41 runs per innings. His career total of 74 centuries is second only to John Langridge's 76 among players who never played Test cricket. He was also an occasional wicket-keeper and a fine close fielder.

== Notable innings ==
Whilst on Sussex's books, in 1972 McEwan played Worthing Evening Cricket League for Greystoke and in scoring 126* against Lyles, an innings which included seven 6s and thirteen 4s, he secured not only the first century in Division 1 but also the highest league score which still stood as at 1988. He also turned out that year for Worthing in the Sussex Invitation Cricket League.

While at Eastern Province, in the first innings of the Currie Cup final of the 1988/89 season against Transvaal, McEwan made 191 in a 337-run third wicket partnership with Philip Amm (214) to set up Eastern Province's historic victory by an innings and 103 runs: it was Eastern Province's first Currie Cup, and the first time since 1890/91 that any team other than Transvaal, Natal or Western Province had won the cup.
