= Colin Croft =

West Indian cricketer

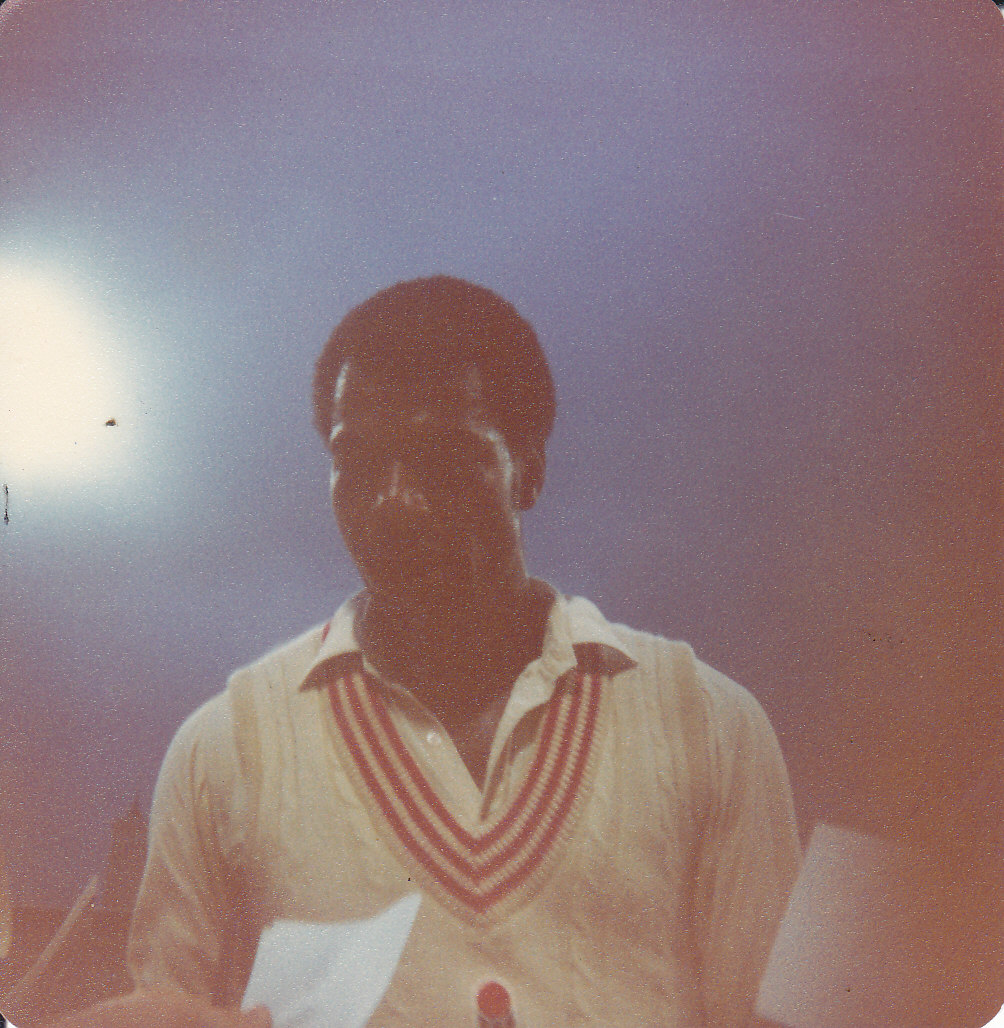
- Croft in 1977

Personal information
- Full name: Colin Everton Hunte Croft
- Born: 15 March 1953 (age 73); Unity Village, Demerara-Mahaica, British Guiana
- Nickname: Smiling Assassin
- Height: 6 ft 5 in (1.96 m)
- Batting: Right-handed
- Bowling: Right-arm fast
- Role: Bowler

International information
- National side: West Indies
- Test debut (cap 159): 18 February 1977 v Pakistan
- Last Test: 30 January 1982 v Australia
- ODI debut (cap 20): 16 March 1977 v Pakistan
- Last ODI: 24 November 1981 v Australia

Domestic team information
- Years: Team
- 1972–1982: Guyana
- 1975–1982: Demerara
- 1977–1982: Lancashire

Career statistics
Competition	Tests	ODI	FC	LA
Matches	27	19	121	81
Runs scored	158	18	855	231
Batting average	10.53	9.00	10.42	15.40
100s/50s	0/0	0/0	0/0	0/0
Top score	33	8	46*	33
Balls bowled	6,165	1,070	21,101	4,083
Wickets	125	30	428	102
Bowling average	23.30	20.66	24.59	24.16
5 wickets in innings	5	1	17	2
10 wickets in match	0	0	1	0
Best bowling	8/29	6/15	8/29	6/10
Catches/stumpings	8/–	1/–	25/–	17/–
Medal record
Men's Cricket
Representing West Indies
ICC Cricket World Cup
Winner	1979 England
- Source: CricketArchive, 14 August 2012

Colin Everton Hunte Croft (born 15 March 1953) is a former West Indian international cricketer. He was a member of the squad which won the 1979 Cricket World Cup.

== Cricket career ==
Croft was (along with Andy Roberts, Michael Holding, and Joel Garner) part of the potent West Indian quartet of fast bowlers from the late 70s and early 80s. With his height (6 feet 5 inches or 196 centimetres), he bowled bouncers and was very aggressive. He was renowned for bowling wide of the crease over the wicket and angling the ball in to right-handers. His approach to the wicket was unconventional and footage of Croft bowling around the wicket show him on a run-up more typical of a left-arm bowler. Croft's figures of 8/29 against Pakistan in 1977 are still the best Test innings figures by a fast bowler from the West Indies.

Croft was involved in a number of controversial incidents during the ill-tempered test series with New Zealand in 1979–80. During the Second Test at Christchurch's Lancaster Park in February 1980, the West Indies considered umpire Fred Goodall's officiating so poor that they refused to emerge from their dressing room after the tea break on Day 3 unless Goodall was immediately replaced. After 11 minutes, they were persuaded to resume. Croft collided with Goodall at the end of his bowling run-up during the fourth day's play after knocking a bail off the stumps with a previous delivery, unhappy at being no-balled frequently and having a caught-behind appeal turned down. West Indies captain Clive Lloyd later regretted not taking a firmer line with his players.

== County career ==
Lance Gibbs arranged for Croft to go to Warwickshire on a coaching scholarship in 1972 where he played two games in the second eleven. With Warwickshire already having a quartet of West Indies Test players, no opportunity presented itself at the Midlands county, but Croft did play for Lancashire in 1977, 1978 and 1982 taking 136 wickets at 26.5 in first class matches.

== Rebel tour ==
In 1982 Croft accepted a place on the rebel tour of apartheid-divided South Africa, in violation of an international ban on sports tours of the country. The rebel players were granted "honorary whites" status by the South African government to allow them access to all-white cricket playing areas. However, there was controversy when Croft was ejected from a whites only seating compartment on a train out of Johannesburg. All the players who took part in the tour were banned for life from international cricket, thus marking the end of Croft's cricket playing career. Croft moved to the United States to avoid recriminations at home. The ban was effectively lifted in 1989, by both the WICB and the UN.

== Teaching career ==
Croft taught maths at Lambrook school in Winkfield Row, Berkshire, UK, in 2007–2008 for one and a half terms. He never coached cricket at the school.

== Media career ==
Since 1994, Croft has been doing cricket coverage part-time, as a commentator/analyst, and was one of the first writers for CricInfo, contributing over 500 articles so far to that entity. He has continued his sports journalism career everywhere that cricket is played, covering West Indies tours since 1994.

Croft's first overseas sports journalism sojourn was to the United Kingdom in 1995. During the 2007 ICC Cricket World Cup Croft provided analysis for the BBC's Test Match Special radio coverage on all the Guyana-based matches. He continued his analyst's role during the West Indies tour of England the same year.

In his private life, having been an Air Traffic Controller from 1973 to 1981, while also playing cricket for the West Indies cricket team, he has also obtained a Commercial Airline Pilot's licence in the US, with endorsements for the UK, and worked as a Commercial Pilot in the Caribbean.

He also regularly appears as a studio guest on Sky Sports when West Indies are playing.
