= Lawrence Rowe =

Jamaican cricketer

Personal information
- Full name: Lawrence George Rowe
- Born: 8 January 1949 (age 77); Kingston, Colony of Jamaica
- Nickname: Yagga
- Batting: Right-handed
- Bowling: Left-arm fast-medium

International information
- National side: West Indies
- Test debut (cap 141): 16 February 1972 v New Zealand
- Last Test: 29 February 1980 v New Zealand
- ODI debut (cap 17): 20 December 1975 v Australia
- Last ODI: 6 February 1980 v New Zealand

Domestic team information
- Years: Team
- 1968–1982: Jamaica
- 1974: Derbyshire

Career statistics
Competition	Tests	ODIs	FC	LA
Matches	30	11	149	52
Runs scored	2,047	136	8,755	1,400
Batting average	43.55	17.00	37.57	30.43
100s/50s	7/7	0/1	18/38	0/10
Top score	302	60	302	87
Balls bowled	86	0	430	34
Wickets	0	–	2	2
Bowling average	–	–	112.00	15.00
5 wickets in innings	0	–	0	0
10 wickets in match	0	–	0	0
Best bowling	0/1	–	1/19	1/0
Catches/stumpings	17/–	2/–	118/–	18/–
- Source: Cricket Archive, 17 October 2010

Lawrence George Rowe (born 8 January 1949) is a Jamaican former cricketer. A stylish top order batsman, he also played for Jamaica and Derbyshire in his cricketing career. Rowe was later named as one of Jamaica's top five cricketers of the 20th century.

== Playing career ==
Rowe made his debut for Jamaica in the 1968–69 cricketing season. He then made history on his Test match debut against New Zealand at Sabina Park, Kingston in 1972, scoring 214 and 100 not out, the first time that a cricketer had scored a double and single century on Test debut. It also gave him a batting average of 314 after his first Test match.

During 1974 Rowe scored 302 versus England at Barbados' Kensington Oval. This was and still remains the highest score by a West Indian at Kensington Oval. He also became one of only four West Indians to have scored a triple century, with the others being Garfield Sobers, Chris Gayle and Brian Lara.

On his arrival in Australia for the 1975–76 tour Rowe was being hailed as the best batsman in the world. A century in his second Test innings in Australia maintained his average at over 70 runs per innings and it seemed to confirm his reputation. The team was humiliated by the Australian side over the rest of the series and Rowe never regained his previously devastating form.

Rowe was a West Indies batting "hero" in the days before Viv Richards. He was known to whistle while he batted though he seemed to be a bit injury prone. During 1974 he started to suffer from astigmatism along with an allergy to grass. As well he dislocated his shoulder while playing against England in 1980.

Playing between 1972 and 1980, Rowe scored a total of 2,047 runs at an average of 43 in his Test career. He also featured for the Windies in 11 One Day Internationals. Rowe played for Derbyshire in the English County Championship and also joined World Series Cricket, where he scored 175 in one match for the WSC West Indies XI.

Rowe later captained two rebel tours to South Africa, during apartheid when the country was isolated from world sport. The West Indies Cricket Board (WICB) thereafter banned the side's players for life, though this ban was eventually lifted in 1989. The Windies rebels twice toured South Africa in both the 1982–83 and 1983–84 seasons. While they lost the 50 over and drew the first class contests in their first tour, the Windies rebels went on to win both series in their subsequent tour. Soon after, Rowe migrated and permanently settled in Miami, US where he eventually became a successful businessman.

During the lunch break of the first Test between West Indies and India on 20 June 2011, Rowe was honoured when the Sabina Park pavilion was named after him, in a ceremony that also honoured Michael Holding and Courtney Walsh. He took the opportunity to apologise on behalf of the rebel West Indian team, saying:

"...Today I sincerely apologise to the cricketing fraternity of Jamaica, the Caribbean and the rest of the world."

However, after much protest Lyndel Wright, the Jamaica Cricket Association president, stated their decision was revoked, after Rowe stated publicly that he saw nothing wrong with his decision to tour apartheid South Africa.

=== Playing style ===
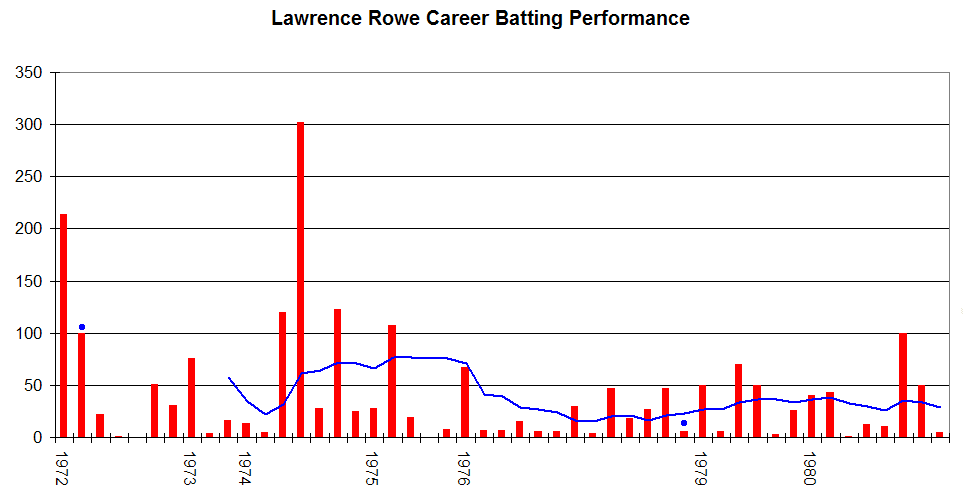
Lawrence Rowe's career performance graph.

As an elegant right-handed batsman Rowe, also known as "Yagga", was described by Michael Holding, his teammate, as "the best batsman I ever saw". It was felt that his ability was so extraordinary that Gary Sobers believed he could have been the greatest of all West Indian batsmen. At one game Rowe hit a ball so cleanly that it followed a level trajectory like a guided missile over the boundary for six. Gideon Haigh describes the incident:

Early in his innings against England at Kensington Oval, Bridgetown, Barbados, in March 1974, he received a bouncer from Bob Willis. He smashed it flat into the stand at square leg; it travelled most of the way at head height. His 302 took only 430 hectic deliveries, with 36 further boundaries.

== Personal life ==
Rowe is the founder of the Lawrence Rowe Foundation, which aims to assist at-risk children.
