= English cricket team in Australia and New Zealand in 1982–83 =

International cricket tour

English cricket team in Australia in 1982–83
	England	Australia
- Dates: 22 October 1982 – 5 February 1983
Captains	Bob Willis	Greg Chappell

Test series
- Result: Australia won the 5-match series 2–1
Most runs	David Gower (441)	Kim Hughes (469)
Most wickets	Bob Willis (18); Ian Botham (18)	Geoff Lawson (34)
- Player of the series: Geoff Lawson

The England cricket team toured Australia during the 1982–83 season, playing a five-Test series for The Ashes and a number of tour matches against Australian domestic teams before competing in a One-Day International (ODI) series against New Zealand for the Rothmans Cup. In between those competitions, England also participated in the Benson & Hedges World Series Cricket triangular ODI series against Australia and New Zealand.

== Background ==
The 1982/83 series, sponsored by Benson & Hedges and celebrating the centenary of the Ashes, was the first to be held in Australia following the rapprochement between the Australian Cricket Board (ACB) and Kerry Packer's World Series Cricket franchise. There had been a test series organized between Australia and England during the 1979–80 season, but this was part of a "triangular" test series that also involved the West Indies, and so the Ashes were not being contested.

It had also been 18 months since the memorable 1981 Ashes series, which England had won 3–1 thanks to the heroics of several players, chief among them Ian Botham. In the lead-up to the 1982/83 series, the Nine Network, which had won exclusive rights to broadcast cricket on Australia television for ten years following World Series Cricket, ran an advertising campaign drawing on national stereotypes and aimed to inspire patriotism and an appetite for revenge.

== England squad ==
The England selectors announced their squad on 11 September which flew out to Australia on 13 October. Doug Insole was appointed Tour Manager, with Norman Gifford as his assistant, while Warwickshire physiotherapist Bernard Thomas joined the squad for his eleventh successive tour. Veteran pace bowler Bob Willis was appointed captain. The squad was weakened by the absence of a number of players from the previous Ashes series who had become ineligible for selection; Graham Gooch, Geoff Boycott, John Emburey, Mike Hendrick, Alan Knott, Wayne Larkins, Chris Old, Peter Willey and Bob Woolmer were serving three-year bans from international cricket due to their participation in the rebel tour to South Africa. Somewhat more controversial was the omission of available players like Mike Gatting, Trevor Jesty, Graham Dilley and Phil Edmonds; Gatting and Edmonds had played pivotal roles in Middlesex' county championship success, Gatting scoring over 1600 runs at an average of nearly 59, as well as contributing 21 wickets, and Edmonds taking 80 wickets. With three off-spinners selected in the squad (Hemmings, Marks and Miller), his left-arm orthodox spin would have provided much-needed variety. To bolster their pace stocks, the selectors sprang a surprise by including 21-year-old Jamaican-born Norman Cowans.

- Ian Botham (Somerset)
- Geoff Cook (Northamptonshire)
- Norman Cowans (Middlesex)
- Graeme Fowler (Lancashire)
- Ian Gould (Sussex)
- David Gower (Leicestershire)
- Eddie Hemmings (Nottinghamshire)
- Robin Jackman (Surrey)
- Allan Lamb (Northamptonshire)
- Vic Marks (Somerset)
- Geoff Miller (Derbyshire)
- Derek Pringle (Essex)
- Derek Randall (Nottinghamshire)
- Chris Tavaré (Kent)
- Bob Taylor (Derbyshire)
- Bob Willis (Warwickshire)

== Tour matches ==
=== First-class: Queensland v England XI ===
22–25 October 1982
Scorecard

Queensland	v	England XI
9/297d (82 overs); Harry Frei 57 (37); Bob Willis 3/43 (13 overs)		372 (99.2 overs); Allan Lamb 117 (177); Brett Henschell 4/51 (12.2 overs)
5/435d (125 overs); Greg Chappell 126 (176); Geoff Miller 2/66 (27 overs)		189 (63.1 overs); Geoff Miller 46 (73); Brett Henschell 5/60 (18.1 overs)

Queensland won by 171 runs
The Gabba, Brisbane
Umpires: Mel Johnson (Aus) and Jimmy Taylor (Aus)

- Queensland won the toss and elected to bat

=== Other: Northern New South Wales v England XI ===
27–29 October 1982
Scorecard

Northern New South Wales	v	England XI
163 (68.1 overs); Rick McCosker 53; Eddie Hemmings 5/38 (25 overs)		305 (131 overs); Chris Tavaré 157; Stephen Hatherell 5/37 (29 overs)
166 (77 overs); Gregory Arms 53; Eddie Hemmings 4/30 (18 overs)		27/0 (13 overs); Chris Tavaré 15*

England XI won by 10 wickets
Number 1 Sports Ground, Newcastle
Umpires: J Humble (Aus) and B Warby (Aus)

- Northern New South Wales won the toss and elected to bat

=== First-class: South Australia v England XI ===
31 October - 3 November 1982
Scorecard

England XI	v	South Australia
492/9d (155 overs); Geoff Miller 83 (150); Peter Sleep 3/89 (34 overs)		344 (109.3 overs); David Hookes 74 (101); Eddie Hemmings 4/102 (44.3 overs)
226/8d (71 overs); Derek Randall 47 (74); Peter Sleep 4/86 (29 overs)		271/8 (69 overs); Andrew Hilditch 79 (89); Geoff Cook 3/85 (25 overs)

Match drawn
Adelaide Oval, Adelaide
Umpires: Tony Crafter (Aus) and Bruce Martin (Aus)

- England XI won the toss and elected to bat
- Robert Christensen (SA) made his first-class debut
- Malcolm Dolman (SA) made his last first-class appearance

=== First-class: Western Australia v England XI ===
5–8 November 1982
Scorecard

Western Australia	v	England XI
167 (58.3 overs); Graeme Wood 31 (92); Norman Cowans 4/33 (13 overs)		156 (58.1 overs); Ian Botham 65 (90); Terry Alderman 5/63 (24 overs)
197 (72.4 overs); Greg Shipperd 39 (79); Ian Botham 4/43 (20 overs)		209/9 (63.2 overs); Derek Randall 92 (136); Terry Alderman 5/67 (22.2 overs)

England XI won by 1 wicket
WACA Ground, Perth
Umpires: Buzz Bezant (Aus) and Peter McConnell (Aus)

- England XI won the toss and elected to field

== The Ashes series ==
=== First Test ===
12–17 November 1982
Scorecard

England	v	Australia
411 (155.4 overs); Chris Tavaré 89 (337); Bruce Yardley 5/107 (42.4 overs)		9/424d (131.5 overs); Greg Chappell 117 (174); Geoff Miller 4/70 (33 overs)
358 (116.3 overs); Derek Randall 115 (215); Geoff Lawson 5/108 (32 overs)		2/73 (22 overs); Allan Border 32* (65); Bob Willis 2/23 (6 overs)

Match drawn
WACA Ground, Perth
Umpires: Tony Crafter and Mel Johnson
Player of the match: Derek Randall (Eng)

- Australia won the toss and elected to field.
- 15 November was taken as a rest day.
- Norman Cowans (Eng) made his Test debut, becoming the 500th player to represent England.
- Playing in his 55th test, Ian Botham achieved a special double, becoming the first cricketer to reach 3,000 runs and 250 wickets at Test level.
- Bruce Yardley took his fifth haul of five-or-more wickets in an innings and also his 100th wicket in Test cricket in England's first innings
- Greg Chappell scored his 21st century in Test cricket, and eighth against England, in Australia's first innings
- Derek Randall scored his fifth century in Test cricket, and third against Australia, in England's second innings

==== Day one ====
In hot and dry conditions (Perth was in the middle of a heatwave), Greg Chappell won the toss and elected to field, meaning that in all five Ashes tests played at the WACA to date, the toss-winning captain had sent the opposition in to bat first. The Australians made an early breakthrough when Dennis Lillee dismissed Geoff Cook for 1 with a short ball the Northamptonshire opener fended off his ribs to John Dyson at forward short leg with England's score on 14. Vice-captain David Gower was next in and ensured with Chris Tavaré that no further wickets were lost, going into lunch with the score on 66.

In the middle session, Gower began to find his rhythm while Tavaré, who survived two dropped catches, continued to frustrate the Australians with dour defence. Lillee, whose cantankerous nature had in recent years become more difficult to control, had already been involved in a number of concerning incidents. After a leg-before appeal against Gower was rejected, he beat a fist into the ground, then following the next delivery which Gower played back up the pitch, Lillee kicked the ball angrily towards the slips. The second-wicket partnership had yielded 95 runs when Gower, shortly after hitting his ninth four, was caught superbly off Terry Alderman by Dyson at backward square leg; Gower's innings of 72 in only 143 minutes was considered the highlight of the day's play. Allan Lamb struggled early and was lucky to survive after nearly playing a delivery from Bruce Yardley onto his leg stump. When tea was called, England were 140 for two from 57 overs.

There was tension and controversy in the final session, beginning when Lillee was again denied a wicket, appealing for a caught behind against Lamb. After some angry looks and muttering, Lillee snatched his sun hat from umpire Tony Crafter at the end of the over; this same umpire had come between Lillee and Pakistani batsman Javed Miandad in an incident during the previous year's Perth test. Tavaré again let his partner take the initiative to push the score along, with Lamb now striking some hefty blows. The pair added 80 for the third wicket before Lamb, having just hit Yardley for a straight six against the sightscreen, edged a ball in the same over onto his thigh and wicketkeeper Rod Marsh was able to dive forward and take the rebound. Lamb had scored 46 in 109 minutes which included five fours in addition to the aforementioned six. Ian Botham, Australia's nemesis from the previous series, strode to the crease and attacked from the outset, scoring 12 off six balls when, in the last ball of a Geoff Lawson over, Botham played forward and appeared beaten by an in-swinger. As wicketkeeper Marsh came forward to take a low catch, Lawson appealed to umpire Crafter for a catch but was rejected. After Lawson had collected his sun hat at the end of the over, he appealed to square leg umpire Mel Johnson, who confirmed to his colleague that the ball had carried. Crafter reversed his decision and gave Botham out. Botham, to his credit, walked immediately even though he had indicated to the umpires that the ball had struck his pad rather than the edge of the bat, and television replays suggested this was the case. it was now Derek Randall's turn to join Tavaré in the middle for the final hour of play, and struggled to settle, playing and missing outside his off stump. Lillee took the second new ball with 15 minutes remaining, but was unable to break through.
At stumps England were 242 for four, with Tavaré on 66 and Randall on 32. Remarkably, Tavaré had not added to his score in the last 71 minutes of the day's play.

==== Day two ====
The second day's play was marred by spiteful clashes between Australian and English fans, which spilled onto the field and claimed Terry Alderman as an unfortunate victim.

=== Second Test ===
26 November - 1 December 1982
Scorecard

England	v	Australia
219 (64.3 overs); Allan Lamb 72 (118); Geoff Lawson 6/47 (18.3 overs)		341 (110.4 overs); Kepler Wessels 162 (343); Bob Willis 5/66 (29.4 overs)
309 (127.3 overs); Graeme Fowler 83 (265); Jeff Thomson 5/73 (31 overs)		3/190 (60.5 overs); David Hookes 66* (121); Eddie Hemmings 2/43 (29 overs)

Australia won by 7 wickets
The Gabba, Brisbane
Umpires: Robin Bailhache and Mel Johnson
Player of the match: Kepler Wessels (Aus)

- Australia won the toss and elected to field.
- 29 November was taken as a rest day.
- KC Wessels and CG Rackemann (Aus) made their Test debuts.

=== Third Test ===
10–15 December 1982
Scorecard

Australia	v	England
438 (156.5 overs); Greg Chappell 115 (201); Ian Botham 4/112 (36.5 overs)		216 (67.5 overs); Allan Lamb 82 (156); Geoff Lawson 4/56 (18 overs)
2/83 (23.5 overs); John Dyson 37* (76); Bob Willis 1/17 (8 overs)		304 (f/o) (104 overs); David Gower 114 (259); Geoff Lawson 5/66 (24 overs)

Australia won by 8 wickets
Adelaide Oval, Adelaide
Umpires: Dick French and Mel Johnson
Player of the match: Geoff Lawson (Aus)

- England won the toss and elected to field.
- 13 December was taken as a rest day.

=== Fourth Test ===
26–30 December 1982
Scorecard

England	v	Australia
284 (81.3 overs); Chris Tavaré 89 (165); Rodney Hogg 4/69 (23.3 overs)		287 (79 overs); Kim Hughes 66 (172); Bob Willis 3/38 (15 overs)
294 (80.4 overs); Graeme Fowler 65 (99); Geoff Lawson 4/66 (21.4 overs)		288 (96.1 overs); David Hookes 68 (87); Norman Cowans 6/77 (26 overs)

England won by 3 runs
Melbourne Cricket Ground, Melbourne
Umpires: Tony Crafter and Rex Whitehead
Player of the match: Norman Cowans (Eng)

- Australia won the toss and elected to field.

=== Fifth Test ===
2–7 January 1983
Scorecard

Australia	v	England
314 (115 overs); Allan Border 89 (198); Ian Botham 4/75 (30 overs)		237 (64.5 overs); Derek Randall 70 (90); Jeff Thomson 5/50 (14.5 overs)
382 (131.3 overs); Kim Hughes 137 (316); Eddie Hemmings 3/116 (47 overs)		7/314 (96 overs); Eddie Hemmings 95 (195); Bruce Yardley 4/139 (37 overs)

Match drawn
Sydney Cricket Ground, Sydney
Umpires: Dick French and Mel Johnson
Player of the match: Kim Hughes (Aus)

- Australia won the toss and elected to bat.
- 5 January was taken as a rest day
- Australia regain the Ashes

== One Day Internationals in New Zealand ==
New Zealand won the Rothmans Cup 3–0.

=== 1st ODI ===
19 February 1983
Scorecard

England; 184/9 (50 overs)	v	New Zealand; 187/4 (46.3 overs)
DI Gower 84 (110); EJ Chatfield 3/27 (10 overs)		GM Turner 88 (129); IT Botham 2/40 (8 overs)

New Zealand won by 6 wickets
Eden Park, Auckland
Umpires: FR Goodall and DA Kinsella
Player of the match: GM Turner (NZ)

- England won the toss and elected to bat.

=== 2nd ODI ===
23 February 1983
Scorecard

New Zealand; 295/6 (50 overs)	v	England; 192 (44.5 overs)
GM Turner 94 (94); RGD Willis 2/54 (9 overs)		G Miller 46 (48); BL Cairns 3/38 (10 overs)

New Zealand won by 103 runs
Basin Reserve, Wellington
Umpires: SC Cowman and SJ Woodward
Player of the match: GM Turner (NZ)

- England won the toss and elected to field.

=== 3rd ODI ===
26 February 1983
Scorecard

New Zealand; 211/8 (50 overs)	v	England; 127 (40.1 overs)
GM Turner 34 (45); VJ Marks 2/31 (10 overs)		DI Gower 53 (75); JFM Morrison 3/24 (8.1 overs)

New Zealand won by 84 runs
Lancaster Park, Christchurch
Umpires: FR Goodall and IC Higginson
Player of the match: MC Snedden (NZ)

- New Zealand won the toss and elected to bat.

== Statistics ==
=== First-class batting and fielding ===
Player	Mat	Inns	N/O	Runs	Avge	H/S	100	50	Ct	St
Ian Botham	9	18		434	24.11	65		2	17	
Geoff Cook	7	14	1	428	32.92	99		4	4	
Norman Cowans	8	13	2	70	6.36	36			6	
Graeme Fowler	9	18		445	24.72	83		4	6	
Ian Gould	4	5		163	32.80	73		1	8	2
David Gower	10	19	1	821	45.61	114	2	6	8	
Eddie Hemmings	5	9	3	228	38.00	95		2	3	
Robin Jackman	4	5	2	88	29.33	50*		1	2	
Allan Lamb	9	18		852	47.33	117	2	5	6	
Vic Marks	4	6		41	6.83	13			4	
Geoff Miller	10	19	4	465	31.00	83		2	5	
Derek Pringle	9	16	5	207	18.81	47*			6	
Derek Randall	9	17	1	732	45.75	115	1	4	11	
Chris Tavaré	10	19		489	25.73	147	1	2	4	
Bob Taylor	7	14	5	188	20.88	37			16	1
Bob Willis	7	13	5	65	8.12	26			7	

=== First-class bowling ===
Player	Balls	Runs	Wkts	Avge	BBI	5WI	10WM	SR
Ian Botham	1918	1033	29	35.62	4/43			66.1
Geoff Cook	336	178	8	22.25	3/47			42.0
Norman Cowans	1342	745	26	28.65	6/77	1		51.6
Graeme Fowler	36	43	2	21.50	2/43			18.0
Eddie Hemmings	1938	789	23	34.30	5/101	1		84.3
Robin Jackman	533	272	3	90.66	2/37			177.7
Allan Lamb	6	0	0					
Vic Marks	642	351	3	117.00	1/39			214.0
Geoff Miller	1950	761	27	28.18	4/63			72.2
Derek Pringle	1581	739	22	33.59	4/66			71.9
Bob Willis	1350	656	28	23.42	5/66	1		48.2

== Annual reviews ==
- Playfair Cricket Annual 1983
- Wisden Cricketers' Almanack 1983
