= Bob Willis =

English cricketer (1949–2019)

Bob Willis MBE
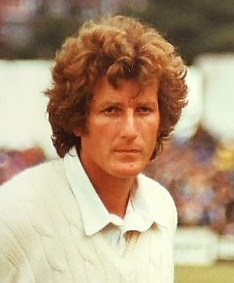
- Willis in the early 1980s

Personal information
- Full name: Robert George Dylan Willis
- Born: 30 May 1949; Sunderland, County Durham
- Died: 4 December 2019 (aged 70); Wimbledon, London
- Nickname: Goose, Dylan, Harold, Swordfish
- Height: 198 cm (6 ft 6 in)
- Batting: Right-handed
- Bowling: Right-arm fast
- Role: Bowler

International information
- National side: England (1971–1984)
- Test debut (cap 448): 9 January 1971 v Australia
- Last Test: 16 July 1984 v West Indies
- ODI debut (cap 26): 5 September 1973 v West Indies
- Last ODI: 4 June 1984 v West Indies

Domestic team information
- Years: Team
- 1969–1971: Surrey
- 1972–1984: Warwickshire
- 1972/73: Northern Transvaal

Career statistics
Competition	Test	ODI	FC	LA
Matches	90	64	308	293
Runs scored	840	83	2,690	615
Batting average	11.50	10.37	14.30	9.46
100s/50s	0/0	0/0	0/2	0/1
Top score	28*	24	72	52*
Balls bowled	17,357	3,595	47,990	14,983
Wickets	325	80	899	421
Bowling average	25.20	24.60	24.99	20.18
5 wickets in innings	16	0	34	4
10 wickets in match	0	0	2	0
Best bowling	8/43	4/11	8/32	7/32
Catches/stumpings	39/–	22/–	134/–	84/–
Medal record
Men's Cricket
Representing England
ICC Cricket World Cup
Runner-up	1979 England
- Source: CricketArchive, 7 December 2007

Robert George Dylan Willis MBE (30 May 1949 – 4 December 2019) was an English cricketer, who represented England between 1971 and 1984. A right-handed fast bowler, Willis is regarded by many as one of the greatest fast bowlers of all time. He was a part of the English squad that finished as runners-up at the 1979 Cricket World Cup.

As of June 2023 he was England's fourth-highest wicket-taker, behind James Anderson, Stuart Broad and Ian Botham. Willis took 899 first-class wickets overall. He continued to find success, taking a Test career-best eight wickets for 43 runs in the 1981 Ashes series against Australia, one of the all-time best Test bowling performances. He was a Wisden Cricketer of the Year for 1978.

In addition to the Test arena, Willis played 64 One Day International matches for his country, taking 80 wickets, and was a prolific List-A (one-day) cricketer with 421 wickets overall at 20.18. As a tail-ender, Willis made little impression with the bat, with a top Test score of 28 not-out (*); however, he managed two half-centuries at first-class level, and for a time held a record number of Test not-outs. Willis captained the England team in 18 Tests and 28 ODI matches between June 1982 and March 1984. Under Willis's captaincy England won seven, lost five and drew six Tests, and won 16 of the ODIs. Botham recalled Willis as "a tremendous trier.. a great team-man and an inspiration", as well as the "only world-class fast bowler in my time as an England player". The editor of Wisden wrote of him in similar terms: "His indomitable service to England is handsomely reflected in his great collection of Test wickets. Although often beset with aches and pains, he never spared himself when bowling for his country."

Retiring in 1984 during a Test series against the West Indies, Willis found later work as a commentator with Sky Sports. He formed a noted commentary partnership with Botham; however, Willis' relatively low-key style, in contrast to Botham's ebullience, meant that from 2006 onwards Willis tended to be used as a second-string commentator. He remained an often-heard broadcaster, a published writer and an occasional critic of the modern game. On the occasion of England's 1000th Test in August 2018, he was named in the country's greatest Test XI by the ECB. The Bob Willis Trophy was established in the 2020 English cricket season in his honour. In June 2021, he was inducted into the ICC Cricket Hall of Fame as one of the special inductees to mark the inaugural edition of the ICC World Test Championship final.

== Early life ==
Willis was born in Sunderland, County Durham, on 30 May 1949, and grew up in the Surrey village of Stoke d'Abernon near Cobham, having moved there at the age of six. His father was an employee of the BBC; Willis had an elder brother named David, with whom he played cricket in the garden, and an elder sister. In 1965, Willis added his third name "Dylan" by deed poll in honour of American musician Bob Dylan, of whom he was a fan.

Willis was educated at the Royal Grammar School, Guildford, playing his early cricket for Stoke d'Abernon Cricket Club, where he later became vice president and a Life Member, and two seasons for the Cobham Avorians. He was also an avid schoolboy footballer, but was not a natural athlete and loathed rugby, which was the school's dominant sport. Willis recalled in 2009 that during his school years "in the winter when the muscled brethren were playing, I used to play football with the school old boys. This taught me how to drink cider and vomit it up on Surbiton station, and other life-altering lessons." His bowling potential was rewarded with selection for Surrey Schools and Surrey Colts, under the directorship of Watcyn Evans, who would become a close friend.

== Playing career ==
=== County debut ===
In 1968, Willis accepted an invitation to join Middlesex and Surrey Young Cricketers on tour in Pakistan, and used this opportunity to further hone his skills. Upon his return he made early appearances for Surrey's Second XI, his first being on 26 August against Worcestershire's Seconds. Willis, 19 years of age, took one wicket for 48 runs in the first innings, and bowled four wicketless overs in the second. He was not called on to bat at all. Two days later, he faced Glamorgan and took three wickets. He played several further Second XI matches during May and June 1969, before his first-class debut on 6 August. Scotland was touring England that season and had already beaten Warwickshire. Willis took three wickets for 13 runs from 13 overs in his first innings, and two for 37 in his second, to help Surrey to victory by an innings and 97 runs. Willis went on to take 22 first-class wickets that season at 17.22 from six matches, placing him 15th in the national averages for that season's County Championship. Surrey came third in the competition that year. Willis also played two List-A games, but took only one wicket at 52.00.

Only Bob Willis' height ever encouraged any sort of belief that he would become an international fast bowler. His run-up was intimidating but slightly absurd... Yet irrespective of the low marks for aesthetic quality in his action, that long right arm, which came down and across at such an unlikely angle, propelled the ball at a hot pace, with steep bounce and unusually threatening movement in towards the batsman.

— Wisden on Willis' early prospects.

Willis had thus earned a second season at Surrey, and in 1970 played 14 Championship matches, taking 40 first-class wickets at 28.37, and 31 one-day wickets at 14.65. Surrey came fifth in the Championship that year. He achieved a noteworthy performance in the Gillette Cup quarter-final against Middlesex. In a high-scoring match, Surrey made 280 for the loss of five wickets. Middlesex appeared to be coasting to victory when they reached 240–3, but Willis turned the game, and they collapsed and finished on 272–9. Willis took 6–49 in his 12 overs and won the Man of the Match award. Despite this, Surrey's preference for Geoff Arnold and Robin Jackman kept Willis out of the team on occasions. He prepared to spend the winter employed at the Crystal Palace Recreation Centre while playing as a goalkeeper for local football club Cobham. However, Ray Illingworth and Colin Cowdrey, captain and vice captain of England's Test team, contacted him via telephone to ask him to travel to Australia and join the current England tour there. Willis, who knew that Illingworth and Cowdrey had little knowledge of his bowling, later credited his call-up to the influence of senior member of the touring party John Edrich, Willis' long-term friend, mentor and Surrey teammate.

=== International beginnings ===
Willis joined England's 1970–71 tour of Australia as a replacement for the injured Alan Ward, and played several warm-up matches for the Marylebone Cricket Club (MCC) in December. Wisden records that his "infectious enthusiasm and team spirit played no small part in Australia's downfall" as England won the Ashes in the subsequent Test series. Willis' first Test, on 9 January 1971 – the fourth Test of the series, played when the series stood level after two draws and an abandonment – saw him score 15 not out as England batted first and reached 332. In the Australian first innings he bowled an economical nine overs for 26 runs, while Derek Underwood took four wickets to reduce Australia to 236. Subsequently, an unbeaten 142 from Geoffrey Boycott set Australia 416 to win. With John Snow routing Australia with 7/40, Willis was only given three overs to bowl on a pitch "without pace", but he managed to take his first Test wicket – Ashley Mallett, caught by Alan Knott for six.

Willis remained in the team for the fifth Test at Melbourne, and rewarded the selectors with 3/73 in the first innings and 1/42 in the second as the match was drawn. Of the final two matches, Willis took three wickets in the drawn Adelaide Test, and four more in the final match of the series, a victory at Sydney Cricket Ground which gave England a 2–0 series victory. Willis finished his first Test series with 12 wickets at 27.41, and had also taken several "crucial catches". He was retained for the second match of the two-Test series against New Zealand in Auckland in March, in which he took two wickets.

=== Surrey to Warwickshire ===
There was something tantalising about seeing Willis and Snow in tandem for Warwickshire."

— Wisden on a potent late Warwickshire bowling duo.

Willis returned in early 1971 to help Surrey win the County Championship title that year. However, friction was developing between him and the club. During the season Willis took 31 Championship wickets at 28.83, but did not accept the contract offered to him by the club. Though the county was reluctant to lose him, Willis sought another club. He took two wickets in his final match for Surrey against Hampshire on 11 September 1971. After turning down Leicestershire and Lancashire he signed for Warwickshire, with whom he had immediate success, with 25 wickets at 29.28, including one five-wicket haul (taking five wickets in one innings). Willis, who under rules then applying, was unable to play for his new county before July, helped Warwickshire win the 1972 Championship, thus achieving the unusual feat of winning the Championship in consecutive years with two different counties. In his final match of the season, he took 8/44 to demolish Derbyshire. His new team won nine of their 20 matches, drew 11 and lost none. He was not selected for the 1972 Ashes series in England, and travelled to South Africa as part of Derrick Robins' invitation XI in January. On the tour Willis took 13 wickets from the six matches.

Willis spent part of the 1973 season injured with one of what would become several recurring complaints. He nevertheless managed 43 wickets in the Championship at 18.95, though his injury barred him from all but one Test against the West Indies cricket team. The West Indies amassed 652–8 declared. Willis took four wickets for 118 runs – career-best Test figures for him unil then – and was the last batsman standing as Vanburn Holder and Keith Boyce routed England for 233 and 193. He then made his ODI debut with two games against the touring team in September, taking 2/29 and scoring five not out as England took a one-wicket victory in the West Indies' first ever ODI match. He went wicketless and conceded 5.5 runs per over in the second, which the West Indies won by eight wickets.

=== West Indies, Indian subcontinent and Australia ===
Willis then travelled to the Caribbean as part of England's winter tour, in what Wisden described as an "automatic selection"; however, he was to struggle against the top Test team. In the first Test, on 2 February 1974, he took only one wicket, followed by three in the second, and one for a hundred runs in the final match. He was to struggle against the West Indies throughout his career. His bowling average against them ended at 36.34, whereas against no other team was it above 26.14.

Willis then returned to England, to face India and Pakistan, playing in one Test against each. Against India he took 4/64 – a career best against that team – and made a Test best 24 with the bat. Pakistan toured in early August, and Willis featured in one Test. He took one wicket for 133 runs. He also played one ODI where he took one wicket caught and bowled as Pakistan achieved a seven-wicket victory. At this point, Willis was suffering from a recurring back injury. He played 13 Championship games for Warwickshire during the 1974 season, taking 44 wickets at 21.56 including one five-wicket haul. In November, Willis touring Australia during the 1974/75 Ashes series, playing in five Test matches. He took 17 Test wickets at 30.70, including a best of 5/42, out of 26 first-class wickets at 31.19 overall. He was, however, playing with growing injury concerns which required several painkilling injections.

=== Injury and operation ===
Willis returned to England in January 1975 with a recurring knee injury which had caused him to collapse at a county game early that season, and underwent several operations to correct it. He had surgery on both knees, and suffered a post-operative blood clot. He was forced to use crutches for most of the season, and reflected in 1978 that it was "similar to a 50,000-mile service". His recovery was particularly tortuous, requiring daily runs around the cricket field and an intensive gym program under the supervision of Dr. Arthur Jackson, an advocate of slow running therapy to build stamina. He played no part in the international arena in 1975, and managed only four first-class appearances, though these returned a healthy 18 wickets at 18.77. He was not to return to the Test game until 1976, where he faced the West Indies in two matches in July and August.

That year, he had made a comfortable return to the county game from injury – taking 16 Championship wickets at 26.12. He had also scored a career-best 43 with the bat. After coming fit from injury, Willis was brought into the squad for the fourth Test against the West Indies on 22 July as part of wholesale bowling changes that saw Brian Close, Edrich, Mike Hendrick, Mike Selvey and Pat Pocock replaced with John Snow, Ward, Bob Woolmer, David Steele and Willis. He took three wickets for 71 runs and then a five-wicket haul in the second innings. This both gave him career-best figures and took him past 50 Test wickets. His last four wickets fell in 24 balls at the cost of three runs, described by Wisden as a "fine piece of fast bowling". Tony Greig's England, however, struggled to make any impression on the West Indies through the series, Viv Richards dominating with 829 runs across the series. Willis could only take one further wicket in the fifth and final Test, which the tourists won easily. By this time Willis, whose injury troubles were continuing, turned down a coaching opportunity in South Africa in order to not risk his fitness, and went on the dole.

=== Revival in India and the 1977 Ashes ===
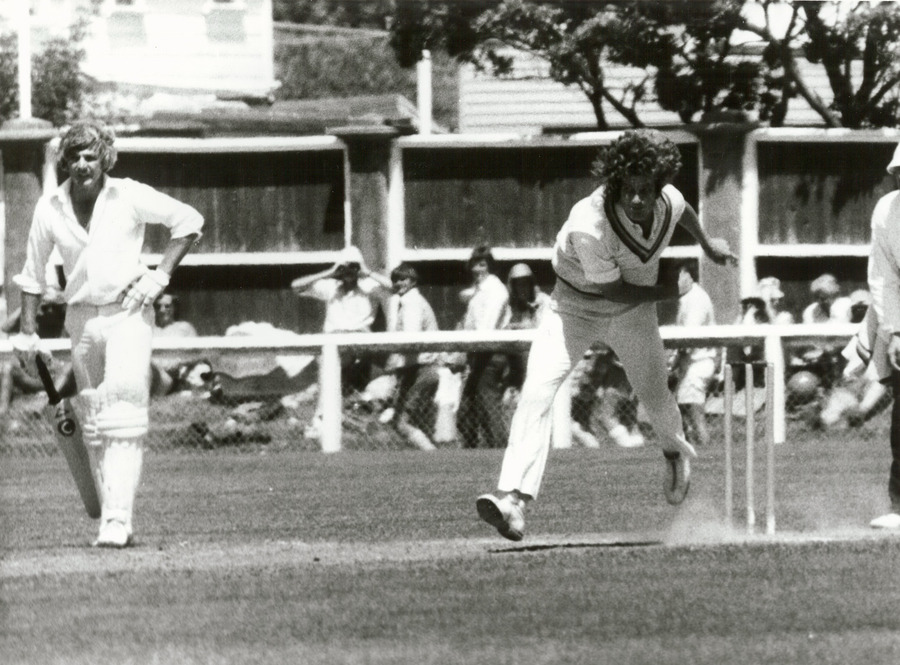
Bob Willis bowling vs New Zealand national cricket team at the Basin Reserve (February 1978)

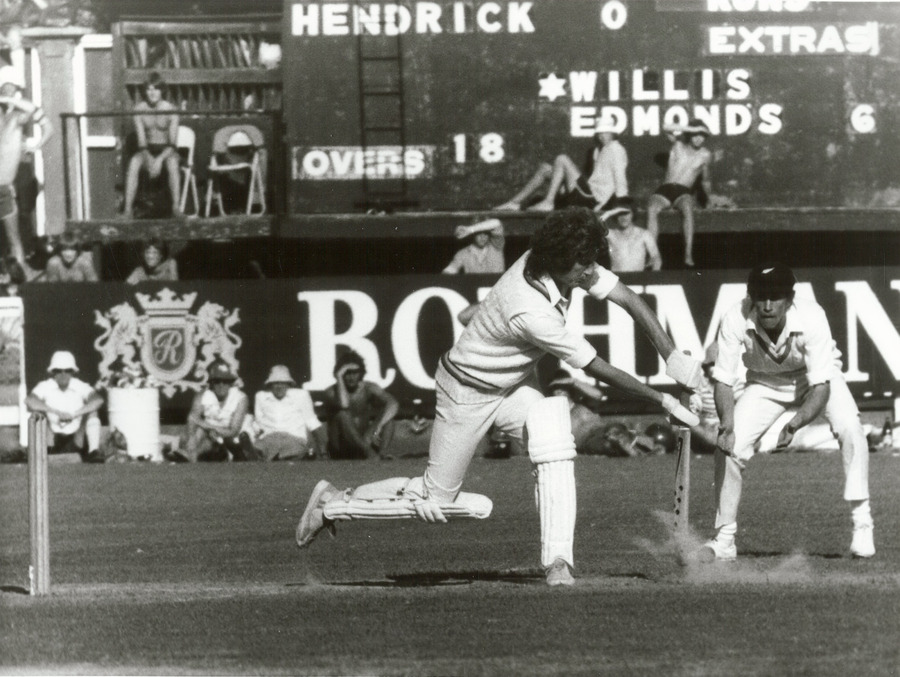
Bob Willis batting vs New Zealand national cricket team at the Basin Reserve (February 1978)

Over the winter of 1976/77, England toured India in a five Test series through December to February, and it proved to be a revival for Willis. Wisden recorded the India tour to be the time when he "put to flight any who doubted his right to be acclaimed as one of the world's foremost fast bowlers". Willis took 32 wickets for 15.09 across the entire tour, 20 of those in the Test matches for 16.75. He took five for 27 in the second Test, and then six for 53 in the fourth – earning him career-best Test figures thus far, and taking him past 400 first-class wickets. Four of his wickets came in four overs with the second new ball, "although he received no help from the pitch". Wisden record that "His 20 wickets in the series stamped Willis as a bowler of genuine pace and in-disputable class."

The 1977 Ashes took place across five Tests between June and August that year, in all of which Willis featured. Preceding them were three ODI fixtures, across which Willis took a total of five wickets at 15.80. The first Test took place on 16 June, at Lord's. Australia, batting second and looking to take a lead over England's 216 all out, were dismantled by Willis who returned a career-best 7/78. After a century from Woolmer, Australia fell to 114/6 with two more wickets to Willis before the match ended as a draw. Willis' "hostile speed" gained praise in giving "Australia a real fright". Wills took four more wickets in the second Test to aid Underwood in restricting Australia's totals and giving England a nine wicket victory, and was "fast and accurate" in the third Test for his five-wicket haul, the match in which Botham made his debut. Willis went wicketless in England's innings victory in the fourth Test, however he took another five-for in the final match, including both Australian openers. His 27 wickets across the series was a record for an England fast bowler facing Australia in England, and his final wicket of the series was his 100th. Around these Test matches, Willis also made 10 County Championship appearances, netting 29 wickets at 19.41. This included a haul of 8/32 against Gloucestershire on 20 August, which would remain his best first-class figures for his career.

The year ended with Willis on winter tour to Pakistan and New Zealand. Willis dismissed seven Pakistani batsmen for 27.14 runs each, though did not appear in any of the ODI matches. In New Zealand he took a further 14 wickets at 18.21, including 5/32 in the first Test. In the second innings of the second Test of this series, Willis, by now England vice-captain, was involved in a notorious incident in which Ian Botham - apparently on Willis's recommendation - intentionally ran out captain Geoff Boycott in order to assist the team in pressing for a result. England indeed went on to win the match, Willis taking 4/14 in the second innings.

=== Wisden Cricketer of the Year – 1978 ===
Willis made 10 Championship appearances in the 1978 season, taking 37 wickets at 18.27. He was also third in the national averages for the Benson and Hedges Cup that year, with 16 wickets at 6.75, including four wickets for four runs in one innings. That year also saw Pakistan and New Zealand return to tour England between June and August. Though Botham took Man of the Series for his 13 wickets (in addition to scoring two centuries with the bat), Willis also netted 13 Pakistani batsmen for 17.92, including a five-wicket haul in the second Test. He also earned a Man of the Match award for his 4/15 in the first ODI. In the second ODI Willis captained England in an international for the first time because of an injury to Geoff Boycott. He was however also involved with a controversy regarding the growing practice of short-pitched bowling at tailend batsman after Iqbal Qasim was forced to retire hurt after being hit by one of his deliveries in the first Test at Birmingham. Against New Zealand, Willis took 12 Test wickets at 19.08, and passed 150 career Test wickets with his 4/16 in the third Test.

Wisden noted Willis' achievements against Australia in 1977, stating that "the new-ball fire power of Bob Willis, which yielded 27 wickets, was of special significance in England's high summer of success. No England bowler of authentic speed can boast a comparable record in a home series against Australia". In continued: "It was singularly appropriate that team and personal triumph should go hand in hand, for few players have given such loyal and unstinted service to England as the wholehearted Willis... Happily determination is one virtue Willis does not lack, and his re-emergence as a top ranking fast bowler was well and truly deserved." Across all first-class matches that year, Willis had taken 65 wickets at 18.41, the most of any season of his career. His 35 List-A wickets was also the second highest he would achieve for a season behind the 45 of 1983. Wisden also praised him for refusing to partake in Kerry Packer's World Series cricket, and proclaimed him a Wisden Cricketer of the Year along with Botham, Hendrick, Alan Jones and Ken McEwan.

=== 1978–79 Ashes ===
In the winter of 1978/79, Willis travelled to Australia for that season's Ashes series, which England won 5–1 against an Australian team depleted by the rebel Packer tour. The tour commenced with four first-class fixtures against South Australia, Victoria, New South Wales and Queensland. Willis then bowled 1,123 deliveries during the Test series, taking 20 wickets at 23.05. In the first Test on 1 December 1978, he took 4/44 and 3/69 in a seven-wicket England win. He then took 5/44 in the second match on 15 December, as England secured a 2:0 lead with a 166 run victory, and following an abandoned ODI match on Boxing Day failed to take a wicket as Australia won the third Test to bring the series to 2:1.

The fourth Test followed on 6 January, and England took a 93-run victory with two wickets to Willis, before a repeat of the first ODI was attempted and again abandoned after 7.2 overs. England then played three first-class matches before a second ODI on 24 January. Australia, batting first, were routed for 101 all out by Hendrick and Botham, Willis bowling a wicketless but economic spell of eight overs for 15 runs and four maidens. England reached the target with seven wickets to spare. In the fifth Test that followed, Willis picked up 3/41 in Australia's second innings, however with the bat he made 24 from 20 balls, with three fours and a six. With this cameo knock, he both surpassed his previous best Test score, and passed 1,500 first-class runs.

In the sixth and final Test, England took a nine wicket victory to seal the series convincingly 5−1. Willis took 1/48 and managed to hit 10 runs with the bat. Willis "struck early and decisive blows" through the series, although struggled for rhythm between the second and fifth Tests, whereupon he "suddenly regained his fire and rhythm". In all first-class fixtures of the tour, Willis had taken 34 wickets at 20.47, though this was the third-highest average of the England bowlers. His tail-end batting had netted him 115 runs at 12.77.

=== 1979 World Cup ===
In 1979, England hosted the Cricket World Cup. The host nation played a 13-man squad: captain Mike Brearley, Botham, Geoffrey Boycott, Phil Edmonds, Graham Gooch, David Gower, Hendrick, Wayne Larkins, Geoff Miller, Chris Old, Derek Randall, Bob Taylor (wk) and Willis. England, who had no warm-up games, played their first match against Australia on 9 June at Lord's, whom they "breezed" past. Willis took one wicket for 20 runs from his 11 overs, surpassed by Boycott – who would be an unlikely bowling hero during the tournament – who took 2/15. Reduced to chasing 159, England proceeded slowly, with Brearley's 44 coming from 147 balls, and they reached the target at 47.1 overs. Their next game, against Canada, saw the visiting team routed for 45 with Willis taking 4/11 and Man of the Match Old taking 4/8. Boycott and Gooch finished the game within 13.5 overs. England's final Group A match on 16 June saw them defeat Pakistan by 14 runs. Willis hit three fours in his 24 from 37 balls to help England to 165/9, and his one wicket for 37 runs, along with Boycott's 2/14, helped England keep Pakistan from the target.

England thus qualified for the semi-finals against New Zealand. Willis managed to chip one run from his two balls as England reached 221/8, and then took a single wicket to keep New Zealand to 212. During the match, however, Willis fell to injury. He had left the field before the end of the match with a recurrence of his knee injury and was ruled out of the final, which England lost to the West Indies. Though he missed the final, Willis took seven wickets across the whole competition at 15.57 runs each – placing him fifth in bowling average across all the teams, and his economy rate of 2.44 runs an over was the fourth best.

Willis followed his recuperation from injury by playing the first, third and fourth Test matches against India, taking 10 wickets at 29.80. Between his international appearances, he struggled with nine Championship wickets at 42.00, as Warwickshire came fifteenth in the country.

=== 1980, Australia and the West Indies ===
The winter of 1979/80 and the followed summer saw difficult tours for Willis: the Benson and Hedges World Series Cup and a Test tour in Australia followed by a home series against the West Indies. Willis partook in all seven of England's matches for the World Series Cup, however he struggled with six wickets at 41.00. England did secure the highest number of points however they were beaten in both finals by the West Indies. In the midst of these matches, England and Australia played three Test matches in which Willis took only 3 wickets at 74.66, going wicketless in third Test. In the county front, however, his position at Warwickshire was reaffirmed as he was appointed county captain.

Two ODI matches back in England commenced the West Indies tour, with Willis being included only in the team for the second match, here he took two wickets and two catches in a three-wicket England victory. Wills then faced the West Indies Test team across four matches, the first on 5 June. He took four wickets for 82 runs in the first innings, and five in the second – passing 650 first-class wickets in the process though the Man of the Match award was given to Andy Roberts' 5/72 and 3/57, the West Indies winning by two wickets. The second Test was a draw, though Willis collected three wickets. He only managed 1/99 in the third match, however, and equalled his Test best score of 24 with the bat in the fourth Test at the Oval, passing 500 Test runs in the process, and helping to save a test match which had appeared lost by sharing in an unbroken last-wicket partnership of 117 with Peter Willey. The West Indies nonetheless secured a 1:0 series victory. Willis had marked his improved form with 14 wickets at 29.07, and had fared better in the County Championship that year, taking 27 wickets at 31.70. In that season he had also taken 23 one-day wickets at 25.95, and had the satisfaction in his first season as captain of leading his county to victory in the John Player League, only a year after they had finished at the foot of the table in the same tournament.

=== 1981 Ashes ===
Australia arrived in England for the 51st Ashes series in 1981. Willis, who was selected to play in all six Test matches, came into the series on a run of good county form. He had played four county matches, commencing with 5/61 against Yorkshire on 6 May, and 3/58 against Lancashire on 10 June. The first Test took place at Trent Bridge, Nottingham, on 18 June. England, batting first, were cut down for 185 all out thanks to four wickets for Terry Alderman and three a-piece for Dennis Lillee and Rodney Hogg. Only Mike Gatting passed fifty, and Willis was dismissed for a first-ball duck. Willis, however, combined with Dilley, Hendrick and Botham to reduce Australia to 179 all out, with three wickets for Willis. England could not take advantage, however, as Lillee and Alderman shared the host nation's ten wickets equally between them to leave Australia only 132 to win. Dilley took four wickets and Willis snatched Graeme Wood for eight to reach 200 Test wickets, however the tourists won the match with four wickets to spare.

With his Test career in doubt for the umpteenth time, Willis, of the big heart and vicious bounce, gave it everything he knew. Brushing aside the cost of regular no-balls, he bowled at fierce pace to a shorter length and a straighter line than in the first innings. And suddenly Australia's foundation crumbled.

— Christopher Martin-Jenkins's assessment of Willis' efforts at Headingley.

Between the first and second Tests, Willis went back to Warwickshire to face Gloucestershire in a County Championship match, grabbing three wickets. He returned to face Australia on 2 July for the second Test, and England batting first. Thanks to 82 from Peter Willey, and a second half-century from Gatting, together with five runs from Willis, England reached 311 – though Geoff Lawson took seven wickets. Australia surpassed this and were dismissed for 345, with three wickets for Willis and three for Dilley. The England bowlers suffered from no balls, Willis alone bowling 28. England declared late in the game on 265/8, and Willis picked up another wicket as Australia reached 90/4 at the close of play. Botham, who had captained the team until then, was sacked and replaced by Brearley. Willis, who was struggling for fitness and had a chest infection, was dropped from the team. He sat out a Warwickshire county match and after speaking to Alec Bedser was given back his place in the team on the condition that he played in a 40-over match, played a Second XI game, and bowled 12 overs in the nets. He succeeded in these tasks, and was tentatively let back into the squad over a spinner.

The third Test – Willis' 60th – came on 16 July, and England were able to level the series 1:1 thanks to Botham's Man of the Match performance (seven wickets, century and half century) and Willis's hostile bowling in the second innings. Willis bowled 30 wicketless overs in Australia's first innings, and made one run. As England followed on in their second innings he made only two with the bat, but these were part of a 37 run last wicket partnership with Botham. He then returned to bowl with Australia requiring 130 runs. At one point, England had been quoted at 500–1 to win the match. Willis began an "inspired" bowling performance, having requested to bowl downhill from the Kirkstall Lane end once Australia were 56/1. Trevor Chappell, Kim Hughes and Graham Yallop were caught by close fielders, while Rod Marsh and John Dyson were caught at fine leg and behind the wicket respectively trying to play the hook shot. Dennis Lillee was caught from the only ball Willis pitched up. Then when Willis uprooted Ray Bright's middle stump Australia were bowled out for 111, losing by 18 runs. Willis took 8/43, his career-best Test figures. Two of his victims had been out for zero, and three others for single figure scores. John Dyson had top-scored with 34 before Willis removed him. Willey recalled it as an "amazing spell" while Wisden called it "the most staggering bowling of his life when his place again seemed threatened".

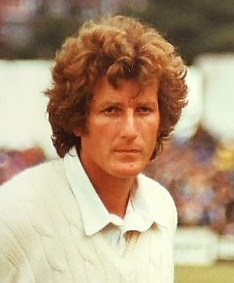
Willis in the early 1980s

England then moved into the fourth Test 1:1 in the series. Again batting first, Alderman's five-for took England to 189 all out, with Willis making 13 runs. He then bowled a wicketless but "stormy" 19 overs "as if the devil were at his heels" and, after England had set Australia a final target of 151 runs, took two wickets which along with Botham's five-wicket haul dismissed the Australians for 121 and handed England a 29-run victory and a series lead. Willis played for his county against Middlesex between the fourth and fifth Tests, taking one wicket. He then rejoined his team for the fifth Test at Old Trafford. England reached 231 thanks to partly to a "priceless" 56-run late partnership between Paul Allott (52) and Willis (11) before Willis then led the bowling attack with four wickets to restrict Australia to 130 all out. Another century from Botham took England to 404, setting the tourists 506 runs to win. Yallop and Allan Border both scored centuries; however, with Willis taking three wickets, and Allott, Botham and John Emburey two each, England dismissed them for 402, 103 runs short of victory.

Willis continued to enjoy some form with the bat with 33* against Nottinghamshire in the interval between the fifth and final Tests, though he went wicketless. On 27 August, Australia and England met for the sixth Test at the Oval. The tourists reached 352 thanks to a century from Border, while Willis took four wickets and Botham six. A century from Boycott then defied Lillee's seven-wicket haul to take England to 314, and in reply Hendrick and Botham took four wickets each to set their team a target of 383 runs to win while Willis went without a wicket in the second innings. With half-centuries from Gatting and Brearley, England reached 261 before the match ended as a draw. England were victorious in the series 3:1, and Botham's efforts led to it being unofficially referred to as 'Botham's Ashes'.

Willis meanwhile, travelled to India with England in November 1981 for a six Test series against India and one against Sri Lanka. He took 12 wickets at 31.75 against India, and three more Test and two wickets ODI against Sri Lanka. Between these international fixtures, Willis had secured 13 County Championship wickets at 28.55, though Warwickshire came bottom of the table.

=== England captaincy ===
Willis the Elder, a dozen years on, unlikely captain of England, struck a memorable and almost perpetual pose in the isolation of mid-off, thin arms across concave chest, large hand propping that promontory of a chin, blue-grey eyes seemingly glazed against what became, in 1982–83 and 1983–84, a painful scene.

— Wisden's assessment of Willis' demeanour as a captain.

Willis began the 1982 county season with five County Championship fixtures, featuring his first half-century with the bat, a career-best 72, while leading Warwickshire against the touring Indian team on 9 May. He also took two wickets. He also reached his 750th first-class wickets with his 2/71 against Yorkshire on 19 May. India were scheduled to play three Tests and two ODI matches that tour; however, before the matches began, the England selectors dropped Fletcher, the captain. Willis, though seen as an unlikely candidate and ambivalent towards the role, was awarded the captaincy. On 2 June, the new captain faced India as part of the England ODI squad, taking two wickets and effecting a run-out with the help of Botham, who also took four wickets. England restricted India to 193 and achieved victory by nine wickets. The second ODI match followed two days later, and England also won – this time by 114 runs with Willis taking 1/10 from seven overs.

With two victories under his belt, Willis led his team to the first Test on 10 June. Batting first, he hit a career-best 28 runs in a last-wicket partnership with Allott (41) worth 70 – an England record against India – which took the hosts to 433 all out. Willis then set about taking apart the Indian batting line-up with 3/41 and 6/101 to leave England 65 runs to chase, which they reached for the loss of three wickets. Wisden described Willis as "bowling near his fastest" and he took his 250th Test wicket during the match. Willis took two further wickets in the second Test; however, centuries from Botham and Sandeep Patil, who hit Willis for 24 runs in an over, ensured large innings scores that pushed the match to a draw. Botham followed with his career-best 208 in the third match to take England to 594 all out, and Willis then took 3/78 to keep India to 410. He then declared England's second innings at 191 to leave India 376 to win, and collected the wicket of Ravi Shastri before India closed out the final day with 111/3. Willis thus completed his first Test series in victorious fashion, with 15 Test wickets of his own at 22.00. In 1982 Willis also led England to a 2–1 victory in a tight Test series against Pakistan, equalling his highest Test score with an innings of 28 not out in the first Test, sharing in a last-wicket stand with Bob Taylor of 79. Willis was absent for the second Test, which England (captained by David Gower) lost, before returning for the tense third Test. Willis was available for only three more first-class games that season, and finished it with a total of 24 wickets at 35.08. In 1982 Willis also captained Warwickshire to the final of the NatWest Trophy, although they lost the final heavily to his former county Surrey. He promptly travelled to Australia to lead England in the 1982-83 Ashes.

Over the winter of 1982/83, England's winning Ashes team travelled to Australia under Willis' captaincy. Willis took two three-wicket hauls in two warm-up first-class matches; however, he was absent from two others and Botham took over the captaincy. By now, continuing injury problems were beginning to plague the ageing bowler's body. He took 3/95 in the first Test as Australia reached 424 in reply to England's first innings 411, of which Willis had made 26. Derek Randall's century in England's second innings took them to 358, and Australia reached 73 at the close of play on the final day for the loss of two wickets, both of which were taken by Willis, leaving the match drawn. Willis picked up 5/66 in the second Test; however, Australia easily reached a low fourth innings target to go 1–0 up. The third Test followed a similar pattern, with England replying with two low scores in the face of Australia's first innings 438, and Australia taking an eight-wicket win to take a 2–0 lead in the series, despite Willis' three wickets. England achieved what was then the narrowest Ashes victory margin of three runs in the fourth Test at Melbourne, with Willis taking three wickets. Willis commentated on the game that "You never give up and you never think it has gone." The fifth match ended in a draw, so Australia won the series 2–1. Across the entire tour, Willis took 28 first-class wickets. In the following World Series Cup between England, Australia and New Zealand, England were knocked out despite 14 wickets for Willis at 21.14.

Willis returned to Warwickshire for the 1983 season, struggling in the county season with 21 wickets at 36.76 in the County Championship, though finding more success in the one-day arena with a career-best 45 wickets at 16.24. He captained England in the 1983 Cricket World Cup where England reached the semi-finals where they were defeated by eventual winners India. He also led England in a four Test series against New Zealand, finding greater success with 20 wickets at 13.65 including a five-wicket haul. This, coming in the second Test, took Willis past 850 first-class wickets and 300 Test wickets. England won the series convincingly 3:1, and returned to New Zealand over the winter. In the drawn first Test, Willis overtook Fred Trueman's record England tally of 307 Test wickets when he dismissed Lance Cairns in the first innings. England lost the second Test by an innings despite 4/51 from Willis. With the third Test ending as a draw, England lost the series. Willis, with increasing physical and mental weariness and now using hypnotherapy to reduce stress and focus his game, took three wickets in the following ODI series, in which England beat New Zealand 2:1.

England played a three-Test series against Pakistan in early 1984, however Willis was unable to contribute more than two wickets in the first match due to injury. He made only five County Championship appearances, taking only nine wickets at 42.22. Willis, with pressure mounting due to injury and poor performances by the England team, was sacked as captain before the upcoming Test series against the West Indies, and replaced by Gower.

As a captain, Willis subsequently received a mixed assessment. Botham retained fond memories of Willis the player, but remarked that Willis found it difficult to captain him because the men were of similar age. Willis, often noted for his enthusiasm, became an "effective motivator" as a captain; however, he was "no outstanding tactical genius" and "towards the end his feelings bordered on disgust at the conviction that some of England's cricketers accepted failure too readily. Nor was he able to close himself off against media comment." He was also characterised as a loner in the game, and a reluctant captain grateful to be placed back within the ranks after repeated defeats while he was at the reins. His 18 Tests as England captain saw 7 victories, 5 defeats, and 6 draws, while he led England in 29 ODI matches, winning 16 and losing 13.

Willis played in the next Test series against the West Indies, taking two wickets in the first two matches. and before the last match played against Derbyshire for his county, taking three wickets. Willis took to the field on 12 July for the third Test and took only two wickets for 123 runs as the West Indies, particularly Michael Holding, "hammered" his bowling – Holding hit 59 from 55 deliveries. Willis conceded 40 more runs from eight overs in the second innings, which Wisden referred to as "the death throes" of his career. He announced his retirement from all cricket immediately after England's defeat, though leading Warwickshire in one last major event a few days later, the 1984 Benson & Hedges Cup final at Lord's, in which they were defeated by Lancashire.

He finished his career with 325 Test wickets, at the time second only to Dennis Lillee, and 899 wickets in all first-class matches. Only James Anderson, Ian Botham, and Stuart Broad have since surpassed his number of Test wickets for England. Willis also retains the world record for most Test wickets without a single 10-wicket haul

== Commentary ==
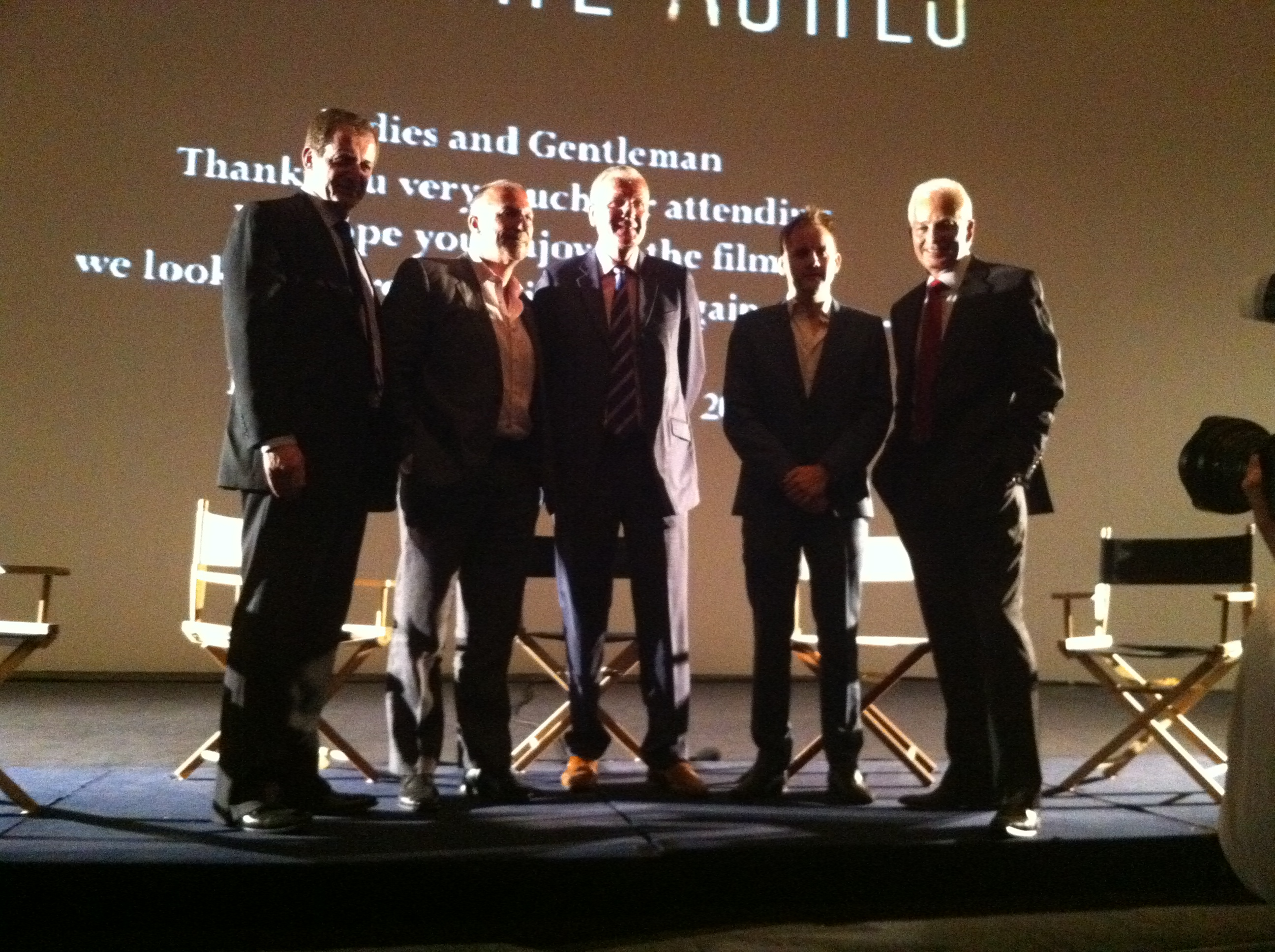
Willis (centre) with fellow commentators Botham and Gower, politicians Alastair Campbell and James Erskine

After retiring from playing cricket, Willis established himself as a television commentator on Sky. Willis appeared on BBC Television's cricket coverage between 1985 and 1987 as a summariser before joining Sky Sports in 1990. When Botham joined the Sky commentary team, Willis was often in partnership with him in the commentary box. Willis' "laconic style did not suit all" and he was dropped from the "front-line commentary duties". He also appeared on David Tomlinson's This Is Your Life in 1991, A Question of Sport in 2004 and 20 to 1 in 2005.

Willis worked for Sky Sports, largely commentating in the county game, where he was vocal on the need for changes in English cricket, particularly through a group of former players known as the Cricket Reform Group. He was critical of Mike Atherton during the England tour of Zimbabwe in 1997. In 2006, he criticised the then England coach Duncan Fletcher's practices, England's performance in the 2006-07 Ashes, and was vocal in calling for the retirement of out-of-form national captain Michael Vaughan in 2008.

Willis attracted detractors due to his somewhat melancholic style. The Independent commentated on the 1995 Texaco Trophy that Willis had "trenchant content, dismal delivery. As a player Willis had trouble getting to sleep. As a commentator he struggles to stay awake. His voice remains on one note – the drone of your neighbour's mower." CricInfo's launching of two polls on cricket commentary both returned negative views of Willis' "hyper-critical" commentary. Willis received only 15% of the vote, above only Dermot Reeve and Allott.

In later years, after he was sidelined as a front-line commentator, Willis appeared on Sky's The Verdict with Charles Colville and was still working for Sky until a few months before his death. Alan Tyers of The Daily Telegraph noted in Willis' obituary that "On Sky Sports Cricket's The Verdict show, Bob would deliver assessments of players and teams every bit as brutal as his genuinely rapid bowling once was. In his later years, his role was that of the fire and brimstone preacher, dishing out ferocious tongue-lashings to cricketers, umpires and administrators alike."

== Personal life ==
Willis married his first wife, Juliet Smail in 1980. They had a daughter born in 1984. He married his second wife, television producer Lauren Clark, in south west London in 2014. Although born in Sunderland, Willis lived in Manchester as a youngster, and was a keen supporter of Manchester City F.C., having first attended a match at Maine Road in 1954, as well as seeing the 1955 FA Cup Final against Newcastle United.

Willis died on 4 December 2019, aged 70, "after a long illness". He had been diagnosed with prostate cancer three years previously. The Bob Willis Fund raises awareness of prostate cancer and money for research into the detection and diagnosis of it; Bob Dylan is an honorary patron.

== International five-wicket hauls ==
Willis took five wickets in an innings 16 times in international cricket, all of them in Test matches. His first Test five-wicket haul came in the third Test of the 1974–75 Ashes series at the Melbourne Cricket Ground. His career-best figures for an international innings were eight wickets for 43 runs at Headingley, during the 1981 Ashes series. He never took ten wickets in a match; his best performance in a Test match was nine wickets for 92 runs against New Zealand in 1983 at Headingley. He was most successful against Australia, taking seven five-wicket hauls. He did not take a five-wicket haul in a One Day International match.

Five-wicket hauls in Test cricket by Bob Willis
No.	Date	Ground	Against	Inn	Overs	Runs	Wkts	Result
1	26 December 1974	Melbourne	Australia	2	21.7 (Note: Eight-ball overs were bowled in this match.)	61	5	Drawn
2	22 July 1976	Leeds	West Indies	3	15.3	42	5	Lost
3	1 January 1977	Calcutta (Note: Calcutta has since been renamed Kolkata)	India	1	20.0	27	5	Won
4	28 January 1977	Bangalore	India	1	17.0	53	6	Lost
5	16 June 1977	Lord's, London	Australia	2	30.1	78	7	Drawn
6	28 July 1977	Nottingham	Australia	3	26.0	88	5	Won
7	25 August 1977	The Oval, London	Australia	2	29.3	102	5	Drawn
8	10 February 1978	Wellington	New Zealand	3	15.0	32	5	Lost
9	15 June 1978	Lord's, London	Pakistan	2	13.0	47	5	Won
10	27 July 1978	The Oval, London	New Zealand	1	20.2	42	5	Won
11	15 December 1978	Perth	Australia	2	18.5	44	5	Won
12	5 June 1980	Nottingham	West Indies	4	26.0	65	5	Lost
13	16 July 1981	Leeds	Australia	4	15.1	43	8	Won
14	10 June 1982	Lord's, London	India	3	28.0	101	6	Won
15	26 November 1982	Brisbane	Australia	2	29.4	66	5	Lost
16	28 July 1983	Leeds	New Zealand	4	14.0	35	5	Lost

== Notes ==
Sporting positions
Preceded by Keith Fletcher	English national cricket captain 1982–1983/4	Succeeded by David Gower
