= 1979 Cricket World Cup final =

1979 ICC Cricket World Cup Final
- Event: 1979 ICC Cricket World Cup
| West Indies | England |
| (Cricket West Indies) | (England) |
| 286/9 | 194 |
| 60 overs | 51 overs |
- West Indies won by 92 runs
- Date: 23 June 1979
- Venue: Lord's Cricket Ground, London
- Player of the match: Viv Richards (WI)
- Umpires: Dickie Bird (Eng) and Barrie Meyer (Eng)
- Attendance: 32,654

The final of the 1979 ICC Cricket World Cup was played in Lord's, London on 23 June. This was the second time that Lord's had hosted an ICC Cricket World Cup final. The match was won by the West Indies when they defeated England by 92 runs to lift the trophy.

== Background ==
The match was the second consecutive World Cup final hosted at Lord's, following the inaugural 1975 final.

West Indies reached a second consecutive final after defeating Pakistan by 43 runs in the semi-final. Previously, they had won the 1975 final.

England was making their first appearance at a World Cup final after defeating New Zealand by 9 runs in the semi-finals. This was also the first appearance by a European nation at a World Cup final.

Bob Willis, England's leading bowler, missed the final after being injured in the semi-final.

== Match report ==
England won the toss and chose to field first. The West Indies got off to a bad start, falling to 99/4 with the loss of Greenidge, Haynes, Kallicharan, and captain Clive Lloyd. However, Vivian Richards (138 from 157 balls, 11 fours, 3 sixes) and Collis King (86 from 66 balls, 10 fours, 3 sixes) consolidated the innings. King especially ripped through the English bowling, with a strike rate of 130.3. The West Indies were already at 5/238 when the 139 run partnership ended with the loss of Collis King. Vivian Richards and the tail then took the West Indies to a very imposing total of 286 (9 wickets, 60 overs).

The English batsmen got off to a good start. But the openers, Mike Brearley (64 from 130 balls, 7 fours) and Geoff Boycott (57 from 105 balls, 3 fours) scored very slowly. They put together a very methodical opening partnership of 129 runs in 38 overs, playing as if the match were a five-day Test. By the time both batsmen were out, the run rate had risen too high. Graham Gooch played some hefty strokes in scoring his 32, taking England to 183/2. However, the loss of Derek Randall triggered the most devastating collapse in World Cup history, as England lost 8 wickets for 11 runs. They were eventually all out for 194 in 51 overs. Vivian Richards was declared Man of the Match.

23 June 1979
Scorecard

| West Indies; 286/9 (60 overs) | v | England; 194 (51 overs) |
| Viv Richards 138* (157); Phil Edmonds 2/40 (12 overs) | | Mike Brearley 64 (130); Joel Garner 5/38 (11 overs) |

West Indies won by 92 runs
Lord's, London, England
Attendance : 32,654
Umpires: Dickie Bird (Eng) and Barrie Meyer (Eng)
Player of the match: Viv Richards (WI)

- England won the toss and elected to field.

== Scorecard ==
West Indies batting
| Player | Status | Runs | Balls | 4s | 6s | Strike rate |
|---|---|---|---|---|---|---|
| Gordon Greenidge | run out (Randall) | 9 | 31 | 0 | 0 | 29.03 |
| Desmond Haynes | c Hendrick b Old | 20 | 27 | 3 | 0 | 74.07 |
| Vivian Richards | not out | 138 | 157 | 11 | 3 | 87.89 |
| Alvin Kallicharran | b Hendrick | 4 | 17 | 0 | 0 | 23.52 |
| Clive Lloyd* | c and b Old | 13 | 33 | 2 | 0 | 39.39 |
| Collis King | c Randall b Edmonds | 86 | 66 | 10 | 3 | 130.30 |
| Deryck Murray† | c Gower b Edmonds | 5 | 9 | 1 | 0 | 55.55 |
| Andy Roberts | c Brearley b Hendrick | 0 | 7 | 0 | 0 | 0.00 |
| Joel Garner | c †Taylor b Botham | 0 | 5 | 0 | 0 | 0.00 |
| Michael Holding | b Botham | 0 | 6 | 0 | 0 | 0.00 |
| Colin Croft | not out | 0 | 2 | 0 | 0 | 0.00 |
| Extras | (b 1, lb 10) | 11 | | | | |
| Total | (9 wickets; 60 overs) | 286 | | | | |

Fall of wickets: 1-22 (Greenidge), 2-36 (Haynes), 3-55 (Kallicharran), 4-99 (Lloyd), 5-238 (King), 6-252 (Murray), 7-258 (Roberts), 8-260 (Garner), 9-272 (Holding)

England bowling
| Bowler | Overs | Maidens | Runs | Wickets | Econ | Wides | NBs |
|---|---|---|---|---|---|---|---|
| Ian Botham | 12 | 2 | 44 | 2 | 3.67 | 0 | 0 |
| Mike Hendrick | 12 | 2 | 50 | 2 | 4.17 | 0 | 0 |
| Chris Old | 12 | 0 | 55 | 2 | 4.58 | 0 | 0 |
| Geoffrey Boycott | 6 | 0 | 38 | 0 | 6.33 | 0 | 0 |
| Phil Edmonds | 12 | 2 | 40 | 2 | 3.33 | 0 | 0 |
| Graham Gooch | 4 | 0 | 27 | 0 | 6.75 | 0 | 0 |
| Wayne Larkins | 2 | 0 | 21 | 0 | 10.50 | 0 | 0 |

England batting
| Player | Status | Runs | Balls | 4s | 6s | Strike rate |
|---|---|---|---|---|---|---|
| Mike Brearley* | c King b Holding | 64 | 130 | 7 | 0 | 49.23 |
| Geoffrey Boycott | c Kallicharran b Holding | 57 | 105 | 3 | 0 | 54.29 |
| Derek Randall | b Croft | 15 | 22 | 0 | 0 | 68.18 |
| Graham Gooch | b Garner | 32 | 28 | 4 | 0 | 114.29 |
| David Gower | b Garner | 0 | 4 | 0 | 0 | 0.00 |
| Ian Botham | c Richards b Croft | 4 | 3 | 0 | 0 | 133.33 |
| Wayne Larkins | b Garner | 0 | 1 | 0 | 0 | 0.00 |
| Phil Edmonds | not out | 5 | 8 | 0 | 0 | 62.50 |
| Chris Old | b Garner | 0 | 2 | 0 | 0 | 0.00 |
| Bob Taylor† | c †Murray b Garner | 0 | 1 | 0 | 0 | 0.00 |
| Mike Hendrick | b Croft | 0 | 5 | 0 | 0 | 0.00 |
| Extras | (lb 2, nb 3, w 2) | 17 | | | | |
| Total | (10 wickets; 51 overs) | 194 | | | | |

Fall of wickets: 1-129 (Brearley), 2-135 (Boycott), 3-183 (Randall), 4-183 (Gooch), 5-186 (Gower), 6-186 (Larkins), 7-192 (Botham), 8-192 (Old), 9-194 (Taylor), 10-194 (Hendrick)

West Indies bowling
| Bowler | Overs | Maidens | Runs | Wickets | Econ | Wides | NBs |
|---|---|---|---|---|---|---|---|
| Andy Roberts | 9 | 2 | 33 | 0 | 3.67 | 0 | 0 |
| Michael Holding | 8 | 1 | 16 | 2 | 2.00 | 0 | 0 |
| Colin Croft | 10 | 1 | 42 | 3 | 4.20 | 0 | 0 |
| Joel Garner | 11 | 0 | 38 | 5 | 3.45 | 0 | 0 |
| Vivian Richards | 10 | 0 | 35 | 0 | 3.50 | 0 | 0 |
| Collis King | 3 | 0 | 13 | 0 | 4.33 | 0 | 0 |

== See also ==
- ICC Cricket World Cup
