= Brett Henschell =

Australian cricketer (born 1961)

Personal information
- Full name: Allan Brett Henschell
- Born: 6 June 1961 (age 65); Dalby, Queensland, Australia
- Batting: Right-handed
- Bowling: Right-arm off break

Domestic team information
- Years: Team
- Queensland

Career statistics
Competition	First-class	List A
Matches	66	17
Runs scored	2,720	290
Batting average	29.56	41.42
100s/50s	5/13	0/1
Top score	162	56
Balls bowled	8,307	294
Wickets	87	8
Bowling average	43.96	22.00
5 wickets in innings	2	0
10 wickets in match	0	0
Best bowling	5/60	3/20
Catches/stumpings	38/–	11/–
- Source: Cricinfo, 30 November 2017

Allan Brett Henschell (born 6 June 1961) is a former Australian first-class cricketer who represented Queensland at first-class and List A cricket. He is also working as a coach in Queensland and has established his own Cricket Academy called Henschell Cricket in 2008.
