= 1980 John Player League =

- Administrator(s): Test and County Cricket Board
- Cricket format: Limited overs cricket (40 overs per innings)
- Tournament format(s): League
- Champions: Warwickshire (1st title)
- Participants: 17
- Matches: 136
- Most runs: 693 Ken McEwan (Essex)
- Most wickets: 27 Hallam Moseley (Somerset)

The 1980 John Player League was the twelfth competing of what was generally known as the Sunday League. The competition was won for the first time by Warwickshire County Cricket Club.

== Standings ==
| Team | Pld | W | T | L | N/R | A | Pts | R/R |
|---|---|---|---|---|---|---|---|---|
| Warwickshire (C) | 16 | 11 | 1 | 4 | 0 | 0 | 46 | 5.031 |
| Somerset | 16 | 11 | 0 | 5 | 0 | 0 | 44 | 4.744 |
| Middlesex | 16 | 10 | 0 | 5 | 0 | 1 | 42 | 4.849 |
| Leicestershire | 16 | 9 | 0 | 6 | 0 | 1 | 38 | 4.504 |
| Surrey | 16 | 8 | 0 | 6 | 0 | 2 | 36 | 4.111 |
| Derbyshire | 16 | 8 | 0 | 7 | 0 | 1 | 34 | 4.134 |
| Northamptonshire | 16 | 8 | 0 | 7 | 0 | 1 | 34 | 3.960 |
| Worcestershire | 16 | 8 | 0 | 7 | 1 | 0 | 34 | 4.718 |
| Sussex | 16 | 6 | 0 | 6 | 2 | 2 | 32 | 5.042 |
| Gloucestershire | 16 | 7 | 0 | 8 | 1 | 0 | 30 | 4.427 |
| Hampshire | 16 | 6 | 0 | 8 | 1 | 1 | 28 | 4.589 |
| Kent | 16 | 6 | 1 | 8 | 0 | 1 | 28 | 4.452 |
| Lancashire | 16 | 6 | 0 | 9 | 1 | 0 | 26 | 4.300 |
| Essex | 16 | 6 | 0 | 10 | 0 | 0 | 24 | 4.936 |
| Nottinghamshire | 16 | 6 | 0 | 10 | 0 | 0 | 24 | 4.441 |
| Yorkshire | 16 | 6 | 0 | 10 | 0 | 0 | 24 | 4.576 |
| Glamorgan | 16 | 4 | 0 | 10 | 0 | 2 | 20 | 4.605 |
Team marked (C) finished as champions. Source: CricketArchive

== See also ==
Sunday League
