= Geoffrey Boycott =

English cricketer (born 1940)

Sir Geoffrey Boycott OBE
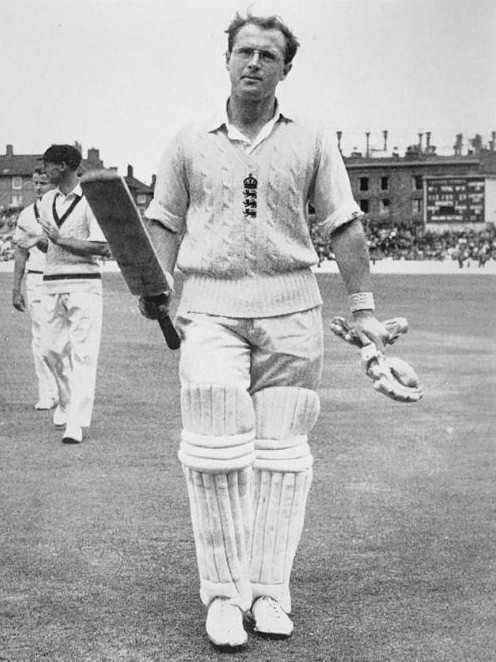
- Boycott in 1964

Personal information
- Born: 21 October 1940 (age 86); Fitzwilliam, West Riding of Yorkshire, England
- Nickname: Sir Geoffrey; Thatch
- Height: 5 ft 10 in (1.78 m)
- Batting: Right-handed
- Bowling: Right-arm medium
- Role: Opening batsman

International information
- National side: England (1964–1982)
- Test debut (cap 422): 4 June 1964 v Australia
- Last Test: 1 January 1982 v India
- ODI debut (cap 1): 5 January 1971 v Australia
- Last ODI: 20 December 1981 v India

Domestic team information
- Years: Team
- 1962–1986: Yorkshire
- 1971/72: Northern Transvaal

Career statistics
Competition	Test	ODI	FC	LA
Matches	108	36	609	313
Runs scored	8,114	1,082	48,426	10,095
Batting average	47.72	36.06	56.83	39.12
100s/50s	22/42	1/9	151/238	8/74
Top score	246*	105	261*	146
Balls bowled	944	168	3,685	1,975
Wickets	7	5	45	30
Bowling average	54.57	21.00	32.42	40.26
5 wickets in innings	0	0	0	0
10 wickets in match	0	0	0	0
Best bowling	3/47	2/14	4/14	3/15
Catches/stumpings	33/–	5/–	264/–	99/–
Medal record
Men's Cricket
Representing England
ICC Cricket World Cup
Runner-up	1979 England
- Source: CricketArchive, 7 December 2008

Sir Geoffrey Boycott (born 21 October 1940) is an English cricket commentator and former cricketer, who played professionally for Yorkshire and England. In a prolific and sometimes controversial playing career from 1962 to 1986, Boycott established himself as one of England's most successful opening batsmen. He was a part of the English squad which finished as runners-up at the 1979 Cricket World Cup.

Boycott made his international debut in a 1964 Test match against Australia. In 1965, while still a young player, he was named one of five Cricketers of the Year by Wisden Cricketers' Almanack. He was known for his ability to occupy the crease and became a key feature of England's Test batting line-up for many years, although he was less successful in his limited One Day International appearances. He accumulated large scores – he is the equal fifth-highest scorer of first-class centuries, eighth in career runs and the first English player to average over 100 in a season (1971 and 1979). Of the more than 60 players with at least 30,000 First Class runs, his average of 56.83 is the highest. After 108 Test match appearances for England, Boycott's international career ended in 1982 when he was the leading Test run scorer with more than 8,000 Test match runs, which led to his appointment as an Officer of the Order of the British Empire (OBE) for services to cricket. When dropped from the Yorkshire team in 1986 he was the leading run scorer in first-class cricket. Boycott was inducted into the International Cricket Council's Hall of Fame in 2009.

He was never highly popular among his peers. Journalist Ian Wooldridge commented: "Boycott, in short, walks alone", while cricket writer John Arlott wrote that Boycott had a "lonely" career. Others have said that the extent of his introverted nature has been exaggerated, and that while he was obsessed with his own success he was not by nature a selfish player.

After his playing career had ended Boycott became an often-outspoken and controversial cricket commentator on radio and television, never slow to criticise modern players' techniques. In 1998, he was convicted in France of assaulting his former girlfriend Margaret Moore; he was fined and given a suspended sentence. In 2002, after being diagnosed with throat cancer, he underwent successful radiation treatment, and went into remission. He revived his commentating career in 2003, attracting both criticism and praise. He is a former member of BBC Radio 4 Test Match Special commentary team and retired in 2020.

== Early life ==
Geoffrey Boycott was born in the mining village of Fitzwilliam, near Wakefield and Pontefract, in the West Riding of Yorkshire, on 21 October 1940. He was the eldest of three sons of Jane (née Speight) and Thomas Wilfred Boycott, a colliery worker from Little Dawley, Shropshire.

When Boycott was eight years old he was impaled through his chest by the handle of a mangle after falling off an iron railing near his home. Boycott nearly died, and in the efforts to save his life his spleen was removed. On 2 March 1950, Boycott's father had a serious accident while working as a coalminer, suffering severe damage to his spine by being hit by empty coal carts: he never fully recovered, and died in 1967.

Boycott began to play cricket at an early age in Fitzwilliam's terraced streets, using a manhole for the wicket. He later claimed that it was at this time that he developed his favourite shots: the square cut, the clip to leg and the straight drive, "because if you hit it straight past the bowler it went right to the bottom of the street, and you could run as many runs as you could get."

He attended Fitzwilliam Primary School, at which he won a Len Hutton batting award for scoring 45 runs and capturing six wickets for 10 runs in a school match. At age 10 he joined Ackworth Cricket Club, demonstrating "outstanding ability". At the age of 11 he failed the examinations that would have taken him to grammar school, so instead went to the local Kinsley Secondary Modern School. A year later, however, he passed his late-entry exams and transferred to Hemsworth Grammar School. His cricket prowess was such that he captained the school's cricket First XI at the age of 15. During winters he attended an indoor cricket school, where he was coached by former county professional Johnny Lawrence.

While studying for his O-levels, he began to have difficulty reading the blackboard and was initially devastated when told he would need glasses. At first his cricket playing suffered, encumbered by the fragile spectacles. However matters improved when a more robust pair, similar to those glasses worn by cricketer Roy Marshall, were fashioned for him at the behest of his maternal uncle, Albert Speight. Albert would go on to be a strong influence on Boycott's early cricketing game while playing for Brierley Juniors Football Club. In 1958 Boycott left school with seven O-level passes and the school's Individual Cricket Cup. That summer he played for the Leeds United under-18 football team alongside Billy Bremner and attracted the attention of Leeds United scouts. During the winter he continued to play nets with uncle Lawrence.

Boycott told the BBC in 1965 that he chose to leave school at 17 because he no longer wished to be a financial strain on his parents, and because he wanted to pursue his cricketing career. He worked as a clerk in the Ministry of Pensions and National Insurance in Barnsley from 1958 to 1963, at the same time playing for a number of cricket clubs. Boycott captained the South Elmsall district team and achieved a batting average of 70. He also played for the Yorkshire Federation's Under-18 team and for Barnsley, where he was noticed by Clifford Hesketh, a member of Yorkshire's County Cricket team committee.

== County career ==
Boycott began playing for his home county in 1962 after topping the averages for Leeds, Yorkshire Colts and Yorkshire Second XI. In 414 matches for Yorkshire he scored 32,570 runs at an average of 57.85, with a highest score of 260 not out against Essex, and 103 centuries in all. He scored another 8,699 runs in List A cricket, averaging 40.08. Boycott twice averaged over 100 in an English first-class season: 100.12 in 1971, and 102.53 in 1979. He is one of only two players to have achieved this, Mark Ramprakash being the other. Boycott was appointed captain of Yorkshire in 1971, but was sacked in 1978 after failing to win a trophy while in charge. He was then dismissed as a player, but reinstated after a members' revolt. During his career Boycott frequently clashed with other strong personalities at the club, including Fred Trueman, Brian Close and Ray Illingworth, but remained popular with the Yorkshire crowds.

=== First years ===
Before he played in first-class cricket, Boycott played for the successful Barnsley Cricket Club, making his debut in 1959 and becoming a regular team member that year alongside Dickie Bird and Michael Parkinson. In one match against Scarborough, Boycott faced a delivery from Bill Foord which he dispatched to the boundary for four. Foord turned to Parkinson and asked: "Christ almighty, what's this lad's name?" Bird remembered his "application, concentration and absolute belief in himself. He had one great gift, mental strength. You can have all the coaching in the world but the most important thing is to be mentally strong." Although Bird later left Boycott out of his choice XI, he would write: "of all the great players I have seen, if I had to pick a batsman to bat for my life, I would go for Geoffrey." He made his Yorkshire Second XI debut on 6 July 1959 against Cumberland at Penrith, scoring five and 15.

Boycott made his Yorkshire first-team debut on 16 June 1962 against the Pakistan touring team. He opened the batting, scoring four in both innings – the first from a boundary off of his first ball in first-class cricket – and taking one catch, but he did not bowl. He went on to play his first County Championship match the next day, on 20 June, against Northamptonshire. Batting at number four, he scored six and 21*.

Early in his career, Boycott continued to play in his spectacles, and later switched to contact lenses. He feared his career would have ended had he not used such aids as his eyesight was poor. Boycott's initial appearances for Yorkshire failed to impress, and he was compared unfavourably to his main rival, John Hampshire. When Brian Close took over from Vic Wilson as captain of Yorkshire in 1963 he persuaded the committee to keep Boycott on, and was rewarded when, on 2 June 1963, Boycott scored 145 against Lancashire. His century was also part of a 249-run fourth-wicket partnership which became a Yorkshire record. Boycott cemented his place in the Yorkshire XI in the 1963 season with successive scores of 76, 53, 49 not out and 50, and on 29 August made a century partnership in both innings of a match against Leicestershire with Ken Taylor. Boycott handed in his notice to the Ministry of Pensions that same year. After a brief loss of form he kept his place with scores of 62, 28 and 113 in the following matches. This second century again came against Lancashire, making Boycott the first Yorkshire cricketer to score his first two centuries in a Roses match, as the hotly contested Yorkshire versus Lancashire matches were termed.

Boycott went on to hit his highest score thus far, 165 not out, against Leicestershire, and ended his first full season with 1,446 runs at an average of 46.64, placing him second in the 1963 national batting averages. He was awarded his county cap on 2 October. At the start of the 1964 season Boycott hit 151 against Middlesex, followed by another hundred against Lancashire in May, and then played for the Marylebone Cricket Club (MCC) against the Australian touring team at Lord's, where he scored 63. On 16 May he completed a third consecutive century, and on 31 May he was called up for the First Test against Australia at Trent Bridge. By the end of the 1964 season, Boycott had topped the country's domestic averages with 59.45.

Although he later became renowned for his ability to occupy the crease for hours of defensive play, he was capable of playing attacking cricket. His highest one day score, a match-winning 146, came in the 1965 Gillette Cup final against Surrey. In his previous Gillette Cup match, the quarter-final against Somerset, Boycott took 32 overs to accumulate 23 runs.

According to the captain, Close, at Lord's after Yorkshire had slowly reached 22/1, Close promoted himself to number three in the batting order so that he could urge Boycott into action. "I joined Geoffrey in the middle and said to him: 'Listen, if I call, you bloody well run.' " Boycott later claimed this plan had been agreed on a fortnight previously, and denied such an incident ever occurring.

Boycott subsequently hit 15 fours and three sixes, even though the modern-day fielding restrictions, which facilitate rapid scoring, did not exist in 1965. One shot, a lofted straight drive off England paceman Geoff Arnold was nearly caught by Boycott's teammates on the players' balcony in the pavilion. Close and Boycott added 192 runs for the second wicket, as Yorkshire posted a then-record total of 317. Cricket writer John Woodcock wrote in The Times that "his magnificent innings contained every stroke in the book. "

In the 1966 season Boycott scored two centuries in one match for the first time, against Nottinghamshire on 18 July. Against Leicestershire on 15 June 1968 he carried his bat through an entire Yorkshire innings of 297 all out, remaining unbeaten on 114*. It was the first time he had been unbeaten at the end of an innings. He ended the season top of the national averages for the first time. On 27 July 1970 he scored 260*, his highest first-class score in England, against Essex. At the end of the season, Close was sacked by the club committee in what Boycott called in 1987 "one of the cruellest incidents in the history of sport." Boycott, on tour in Australia, was awarded the captaincy.

=== Captaincy ===
His removal will have to be handled as delicately as a military operation.

— A member of the Yorkshire County team's committee, planning to remove Boycott from the captaincy in 1978

Boycott captained Yorkshire for eight seasons from 1971 to 1978, having been appointed following the sacking of Brian Close in 1970. Despite well publicised conflict between the two players, Boycott recorded in 1987 that he regretted Close's removal from the club, and wrote him a letter in admiration for his contributions to Yorkshire. To captain Yorkshire had been one of Boycott's aims since he started county cricket in 1962. Yorkshire's scorer Ted Lester commented later that Boycott "never got the support he deserved from the committee. After the captaincy was decided on a casting vote, the half that didn't want him never wanted him." Some members of the committee wanted to remove him almost immediately. He also caused strife between his fellow players, including a reciprocated dislike for Richard Hutton, with many players leaving the club citing personal differences with Boycott as the reason for their departure.

After his first season as captain he spent the winter of 1971 playing in South Africa for Northern Transvaal. He played only one match however, against Rhodesia in Pretoria, scoring 107 and 41.

Boycott's eight seasons of captaincy were among Yorkshire's least successful. The club failed to win any competitions and ranked low in the Championship table, in contrast to their one-time dominance of English cricket. The beginning of the end of his captaincy came after BBC Radio Leeds interviews in which two Yorkshire committee members and former players, Don Brennan and Mel Ryan, said that a change in leadership was needed. Boycott himself did not suffer a loss of form to mirror that of his county; in his first year as captain, he scored 2,503 runs at an average of 100.12, including a century in his first match as captain. His success was cited by Trueman as evidence that his selfish nature was harming Yorkshire.

Boycott headed the national batting averages in 1972 with 72.35, and was second in 1973 with 63.62. In 1973, however, Yorkshire failed to win any of the 8 championship games with Boycott in charge, and Wisden called the season "disturbingly unsuccessful". It led to further calls for Boycott to be stripped of the captaincy. He was also coming into increased conflict with Richard Hutton, Close, and several members of the committee and senior players. "Looking back," Boycott wrote in 1987 "I wish I had given up the Yorkshire captaincy at the end of that year."

They are small-minded people – people who think they are always right. The whole thing was a set up. They knew they were going to sack me, but at least they could have postponed the meeting. They could have allowed my mother to be buried in peace, but they could not wait.

— Boycott, to Michael Parkinson in 1978 following his removal from the captaincy.

In 1974 Boycott's form dipped, when he scored only 75 runs in the first innings of the season, other than a non-championship century against Cambridge University. He did, however, score 152* against Worcestershire on 15 May to complete his tour of centuries against every first-class county. Both he and Yorkshire suffered through 1975 and 1976, as did his international career, since he refused to play for England from 1974 until 1977. During the summer of 1978 Boycott broke a finger, so John Hampshire temporarily took over as captain. Boycott returned later in the season, scoring 968 runs at 50.94, but this was second to Hampshire's 1,463 at 54.18. A poll of the dressing room showed that 95% of the players wanted a permanent change in the captaincy. On 27 September 1978 Boycott's mother, to whom he was very close, died of cancer, placing further pressure on him. She was buried on 2 October. On 29 September, the Yorkshire club committee met with Boycott to discuss terminating his captaincy. A statement by the club outlined Yorkshire's intention to retain Boycott as a player while giving the captaincy to Hampshire. Boycott, in response, attacked the Yorkshire club and its decision in an appearance on the BBC's flagship chatshow Parkinson on 7 October, prompting both strong criticism from the club and strong public support for his own position.

=== Later years ===
Boycott, after much thought, continued as a player at Yorkshire, scoring 1,941 runs at 61.70 in 1979, hitting six hundreds to pass Len Hutton's record of 129 first-class centuries. In 1980 he scored his ninth Roses century, equalling Herbert Sutcliffe's record. He also finished the season with an average of over 50.00 for a record eleventh consecutive year, surpassing the achievement of Jack Hobbs. He would experience growing friction with Hutton's son, Yorkshire's Richard, as well as with later Yorkshire captain John Hampshire. In the early 1980s Boycott continued his run of form, although a slow 347-ball knock of 140* incensed captain, Ray Illingworth and created friction between Boycott and the rest of the Yorkshire Committee. In 1982 Boycott and Graham Stevenson added a record 149 runs for Yorkshire's tenth wicket against Warwickshire, Stevenson scoring 115 of these runs.

On 3 October 1983 the friction between Boycott and the committee culminated in a unanimous decision not to offer Boycott a contract for the next season. This generated much protest from Boycott supporters, who rallied, calling for his reinstatement at a meeting on 9 October in Ossett, Yorkshire. Bill Athey left the club at this time, and while Boycott in his biography maintained that he had no reason to believe that his actions had caused Athey's departure, Athey later stated to biographer Leo McKinstry that "Boycott's attitude and the atmosphere he created had everything to do with my decision to leave Yorkshire." The "Members 84 Group", consisting of strong supporters of Boycott, met regularly to clamour for the batsman's reinstatement. Their leader, Peter Briggs, stated "Geoffrey Boycott is a giant playing among pygmies."

On 21 January 1984 the Yorkshire Club committee, in the face of this rising pressure, agreed to offer Boycott a contract for 1984. Several members of the committee, including Trueman, Billy Sutcliffe and Ronnie Burnet, resigned. Of the replacement members, 17 were from the Members 84 Group, and Boycott himself was elected, leaving him with both a position on the team and on the Yorkshire Club committee. The 1984 season was, however, not the most prolific for Boycott. McKinstry records that he scored slowly in several matches: 60 in 52 overs against Somerset; 53 in 51 overs against Hampshire; 17 in 26 overs against Leicestershire; 77 in 67 overs against Sussex. This was coupled with continued friction between himself and both players and club members. In particular, Boycott's place on both the team and the committee led to feelings of distrust from both – though Boycott denies this – which led to the loss of support from long-term ally Sid Fielden.

His success on the field resumed in 1985, where he scored 1,657 runs at 75.31, second only to Viv Richards in the national averages. He also shared a record opening partnership of 351 with Martyn Moxon. In contrast to the poor relations between Boycott and the senior players, many junior members of the team remember 1985 and 1986 as pleasant times to be around Boycott, who often coached them on their technique. 1986 saw Boycott score 890 runs at 52.35, his season cut short by injuries which were becoming more frequent as he passed the age of 45. This season was the first since 1962 that he had not hit an overall total of 1,000 runs; he finished eight short in his final match, when he was run out for 61. He advised the then captain to enforce the follow-on, and did not bat again. Since 1984, support for Boycott had waned in light of his slow scoring, multiple injuries and the general atmosphere around him. Both Brian Close and Ray Illingworth increasingly advocated his removal to Yorkshire's committee, and on 23 September 1986 it was confirmed that he would not be offered a contract for the following year. A few months later, captain David Bairstow, a long term ally of Boycott whose leadership had Boycott's support, was ruled out of the running for captaincy for the following season, which was instead given to Phil Carrick, of whom Boycott disapproved. Boycott paid tribute to the Reform Group in 1987, describing them as "dedicated Yorkshire members with a heartfelt stake in their club." He suggests that Close and Illingworth feared his popularity. Boycott was offered contracts by other counties, including Derbyshire and Glamorgan, but he never took these offers up nor played professional cricket again. At the time of his retirement he had scored more first-class runs than any other active player.

== Test match career ==
Over Boycott's 18-year career he scored 8,114 runs in 108 Test matches for England. He was the first England cricketer to pass 8,000 Test runs and, as of 2023, is seventh on England's all-time run scoring list (behind Alastair Cook, Graham Gooch, Joe Root, Alec Stewart, David Gower and Kevin Pietersen). His average of 47.72 runs over 193 innings is the highest completed career average by an England player since 1970. His Test career included 22 centuries, fourth in England's records, held jointly with Wally Hammond, Colin Cowdrey, and Ian Bell and surpassed only by Pietersen (23), Cook (33) and Root (41). England did not lose a Test match in which he scored a century and only 20 of his 108 Tests ended in defeat. John Arlott wrote in 1979 that "any expectation of an English win, except in freak bowling conditions, is based on a major innings from Boycott."

=== Debut year ===
People say he was a manufactured player, but that's ridiculous. He was very good indeed, though he was a grafter who was more likely to win you a game on a bad wicket. But he had the ability to take an attack apart when he felt it necessary.

— Martyn Moxon on Boycott

Boycott began his Test career on 4 June 1964, only two years after his first-class debut, in the first Test against Australia. He top scored with 48 runs from 118 deliveries before he was bowled by Grahame Corling. The match ended as a rain-affected draw, and Boycott did not bat in the second innings as he had suffered a cracked finger. He made 58 at Old Trafford, and then hit 113 at The Oval, his maiden Test century. He finished his first Test series with 291 runs at 48.50.

In the winter of 1964, Boycott was selected for the England team to tour South Africa. After a series of low scores during the warm-up matches, he was more successful in the Test series. His innings included scores of 73 in the opening Test, 76 in the fourth, and 117 in the fifth and final match. He averaged 49.66 in all first-class cricket during the tour, and took five wickets with the ball as England won the Test series 1–0. He made a mixed impression on the other England players, who were impressed by his talent but perplexed by his introverted attitude each time he was dismissed.

=== Early career ===
England hosted New Zealand and South Africa in 1965. Against New Zealand, Boycott scored 23 and 44 not out in the first Test at Edgbaston and 76 in the second at Lord's, but missed the third Test owing to injury. He returned against South Africa at Lord's, but after scores of 31 and a slow 28 in 105 minutes, the press began to speculate that he might lose his place in the team. In the second Test, Boycott made a duck in the first innings and later took 140 minutes to score 16 runs when England needed to score quickly; Wisden described the latter innings as a "dreadful effort when courage was needed". Subsequently, Boycott was dropped and replaced by Eric Russell. Boycott returned to the team at the end of the season for the tour to Australia. In the 1965–66 Ashes series, illness dogged his performance initially. He then hit a form of "brighter cricket" during the First and Second Tests. Uncharacteristically, he hit a four from his very first delivery at Perth, and put on 98 in 16 overs with Bob Barber in the Second Test. In the Third Test, Boycott and Barber shared an opening partnership of 234 in four hours; Boycott hit 84, his highest score of the series. But in the Fifth Test he monopolised the strike, ran out Bob Barber and took 75 minutes to make 17 runs. His form deserted him again when the MCC went on to tour New Zealand.

In 1966, England faced the West Indies. Boycott was omitted from the first Test, but in the second he shared a partnership of 115 with Tom Graveney. However, he struggled during the series and managed an average of 26.57. It was a disappointing year for Boycott both for England and Yorkshire, and his average for the former fell to 36.60. Furthermore, he had only passed 50 twice in his last 12 first-class innings. The following summer, he rediscovered his form. He made his highest Test score of 246 not out against India at Headingley in 1967. His slow scoring frustrated the selectors, who dropped him from the team, partly in response to media pressure. A combination of low confidence and a throat infection limited Boycott to two further Test appearances, playing once more against India and once against Pakistan, for the rest of the year. He nevertheless again topped the domestic averages with 1260 at 48.46. In 1967, Boycott toured the West Indies with England, where he hit a rich seam of form. He scored 463 runs at 66.14 in a series England won 1–0.

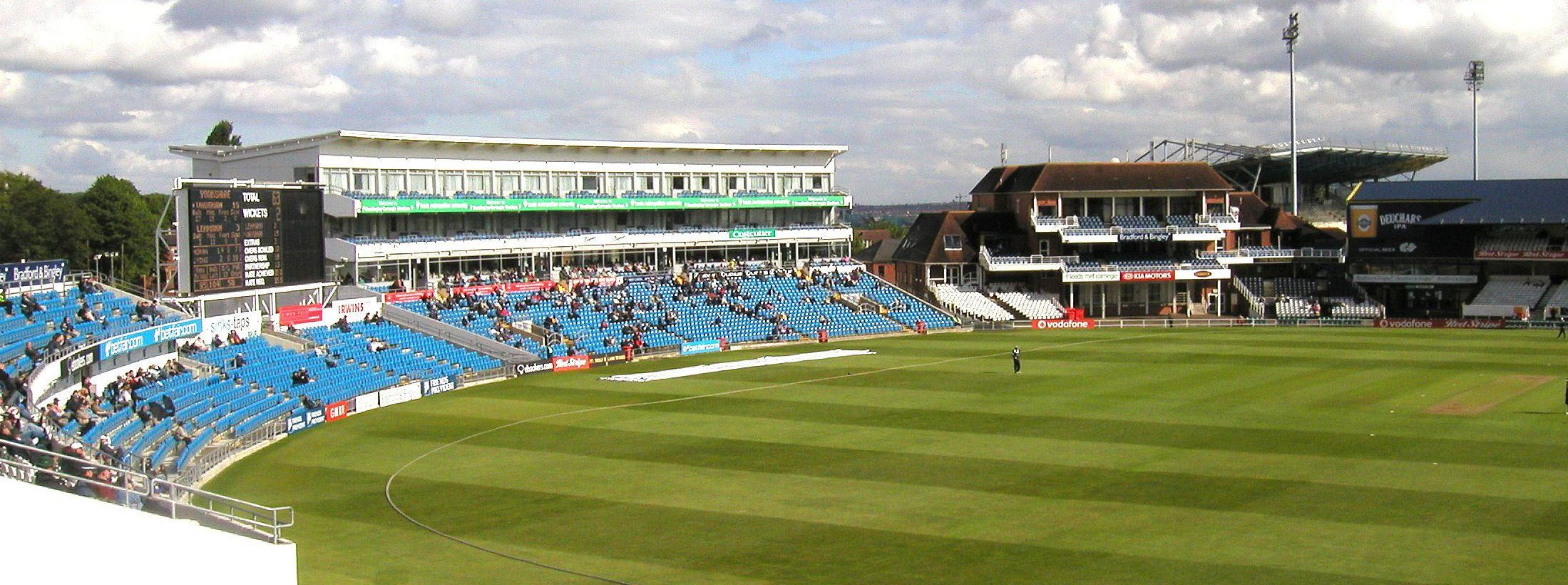
Headingley Cricket Ground, in Leeds, was Boycott's home and favourite ground, the scene of his hundredth first-class century.

Over the next two years, Boycott appeared only intermittently in the Test team. A back injury forced him to miss half of the 1967 season, and an average of 32.40 against the Australians during the 1968 Ashes was unspectacular. Domestically, his injury also limited his contribution; however, he did hit five centuries before he was forced to stop playing in June 1968. Health problems with his spleen and trouble adjusting to wearing contact lenses meant that Boycott missed the tour of Pakistan in 1968/69, but he returned to the team by the summer of 1969, scoring 128 against the West Indies at Old Trafford, and another century at Lord's. However, he lost form in the rest of the season; he scored 12 and 0 in the third Test and averaged only 20.20, with two ducks, in the three Tests against New Zealand.

Boycott was left out of the first three Tests against the World XI in 1970; he played in the fourth and scored 15 and 64, and in the final Test of the summer scored 157. He won the Walter Lawrence Trophy for this century. He was selected for the 1970–71 tour of Australia, and averaged 95.93 over all first-class matches. He scored 173 in the opening first-class game, followed by 124 against Queensland. In the third Test match, having hit good partnerships in the first two, Boycott made 77 and 142 not out.

This incident was used as evidence for Boycott's selfish attitude for many years after. His highest score was 142 not out in the second innings of the Fourth Test at Sydney, in a 299-run victory. The Fifth Test was drawn, Boycott making 12 and 76*, and in the Sixth Test he was run out for 58. Boycott initially refused to leave the ground in disbelief, and eventually walked off to jeering from the crowd. He made 119 in the second innings but injured his arm against fast bowler Garth McKenzie in a following one-day match and missed the final Test, when England retained the Ashes. He later maintained that the injury permanently affected his wrist, and that he carried a squash ball in a sock in his pocket, which he could squeeze to keep his wrist strong. He ended the series with 657 Test runs at 93.85.

In 1971, Boycott made his One Day International debut against Australia, the press by then touting him as the best batsman in the world. He was the first batsman to receive a ball in a one-day international and his was the first wicket to fall, after he had scored eight runs from 37 balls. In the summer of 1971 he enjoyed an average of over 100 in domestic cricket, and scored 121 not out against Pakistan at Lord's.

He played only two Tests in 1972 owing to a series of injuries, but rejoined the team in the West Indies under Denness's captaincy. Boycott was dismissed for 99 in the first innings against the West Indies at Port-of-Spain in 1973–74 and scored 112 in the second, having earlier made a career-best first-class score of 261 not out against a West Indies Board President's XI.

Boycott and Denness did not get on well, and at the end of the tour they clashed over Boycott's preference for a one-day match over a three-day game against Bermuda. Boycott recalled in his autobiography that when Denness confronted him on the issue he replied "Get out of here before I do something I'll regret." Boycott had "no confidence in Denness's professional ability and no respect for him as a man and another tour like the previous one to the West Indies was the last thing I wanted."

=== Exile ===
Between 1974 and 1977, Boycott elected to make himself unavailable for England. He said in 2006 that he had simply lost his appetite for Test cricket and the stress became too much for him. Boycott's biographer, McKinstry, speculates that the self-imposed exile may also have been linked to the appointments of Mike Denness and then Tony Greig to the England captaincy, in preference to Boycott. Boycott was very critical of Denness's captaincy and his standard of batting in his autobiography in 1987, citing it as a factor in his decision, along with the pressures at Yorkshire.

Critics claimed the period of exile, starting with the 1974–75 Ashes series enabled him to avoid fast-bowlers such as Dennis Lillee and Jeff Thomson. Boycott has responded to these accusations by pointing out that Lillee had been out of cricket for 21 months suffering from a serious back complaint and that Thomson had played just one Test at that point: an unsuccessful debut Test against Pakistan (Thomson's match figures were 0–110).

In the meantime, "When An Old Cricketer Leaves The Crease" was released by Roy Harper in 1975, and again in 1978, dedicated to Boycott and John Snow.

=== Comeback Tests ===
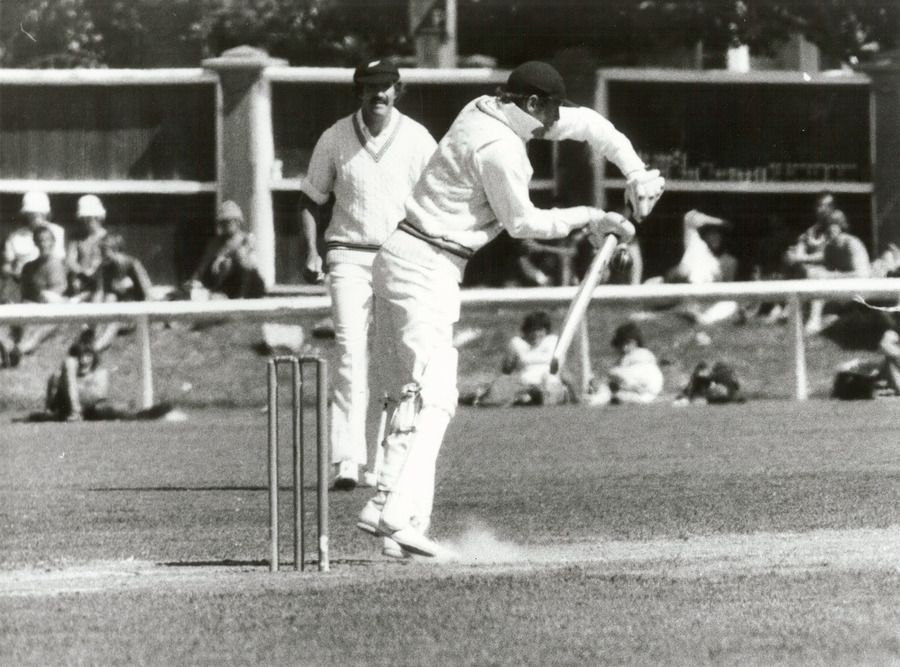
Boycott vs New Zealand national cricket team, Basin Reserve, February 1978

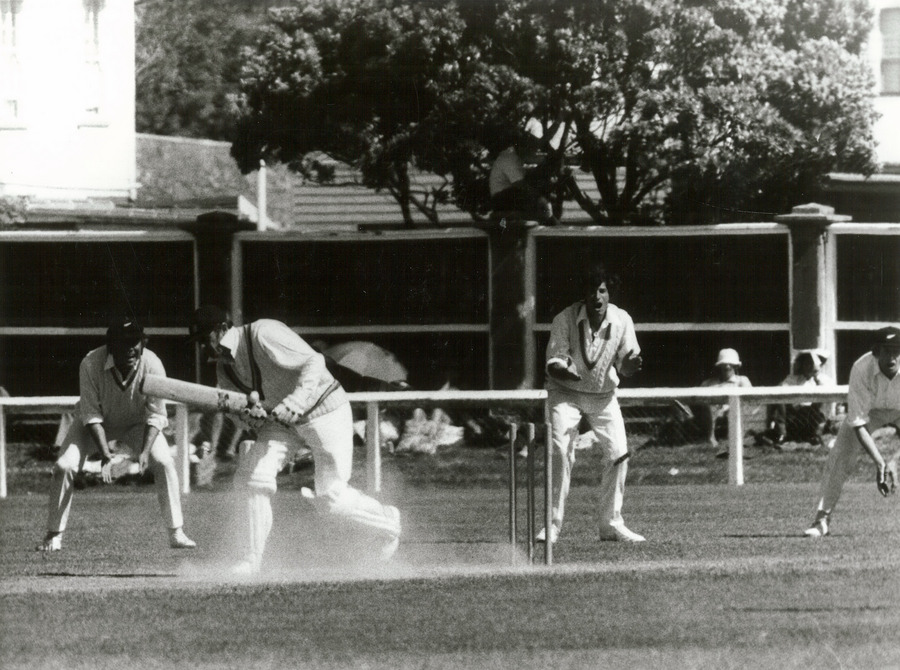
Boycott dismissed by Richard Collinge. February 1978, Basin Reserve

When Boycott returned to the Test team against Australia at Trent Bridge in 1977 he ran out Derek Randall in front of his home crowd before going on to make a century. In this match, in which Ian Botham made his England debut, Boycott batted on each of the five days of the match: his first innings 107 started at the end of the first day, he batted throughout the second day and was dismissed on the third day; he started his second innings at the end of day four and batted throughout England's successful run chase scoring 80 not out, scoring the winning runs in partnership with Randall. Among England batsmen, only Allan Lamb, Andrew Flintoff and Rory Burns have emulated this feat of batting on all five days, and all three subsequent to Boycott. He also had a 215-run partnership with Alan Knott. Botham later remarked that "The Aussies, shell-shocked at having to bowl at Boycott for twenty-two and a half hours, capitulated without much of a fight."

On 11 and 12 August 1977, he scored 191 against Australia in the fourth Test in front of a full house at his home ground of Leeds, becoming the first cricketer to score his one hundredth first-class century in a Test match. Boycott reached the milestone from the bowling of Greg Chappell with an on drive for four. In the match, Boycott became the fourth English player to be on the field for the entire duration of a Test. Boycott ended the series with 442 runs at an average of 147.33.

Appointed vice-captain for the tour of Pakistan and New Zealand that winter, Boycott assumed the captaincy in 1978 for two Tests when Mike Brearley was injured, and brought with him his successful summer form. However, he was replaced upon Brearley's return. While the rest of the England team took part in warm-up matches, Boycott remained in Lahore and organised a special warm-up match in which the team would play itself. However, he went on to occupy the crease for a long period of time, limiting the amount of time other players had to practise. He later stated that, as the number-one batsman, he should have the most time in the middle. In the second Test match, he scored 79 and 100 not out, bringing his Test total since his return to the England team to 684 runs at 136.80. It was between this match and the third Test that Brearley broke his arm, giving Boycott the captaincy. Boycott led England to a draw in the third match, his leadership receiving mixed reviews.

Following Pakistan, Boycott and the England team travelled to New Zealand. In the opening Test match, New Zealand defeated England for the first time in 48 years. Boycott took seven hours and 22 minutes to score 77 runs in the first innings, and in the second innings England were bowled out for 64 when chasing 137 to win. In the second match, Botham's first Test century took England to 418, but by the end of the match England needed to score quickly to force a win. Boycott, however, told his team that he would play the way he always had, and proceeded to accumulate runs very slowly. Derek Randall was run out, and Botham went out to bat with his captain, informing the dressing room that "Boycs will be back in here before the end of the over." Botham then ran Boycott out, later claiming in his autobiography that he had done it deliberately. Indeed, some have suggested that this was a team order. Boycott disputes the suggestion that the run-out was deliberate in his autobiography, referring to Botham's account as "a story that gets bigger and more fanciful with every telling". The tale does nevertheless remain a renowned story. Boycott then delayed his declaration, much to the frustration of England bowler Bob Willis. England did eventually declare, and Willis took 4/14. New Zealand were bowled out for 105 and England won by 174 runs. Boycott suffered a scratch on his cornea and missed the last two days of the final match, and by the start of the 1978 season, Brearley had taken the captaincy back from Boycott.

=== Ashes series, West Indies and India ===
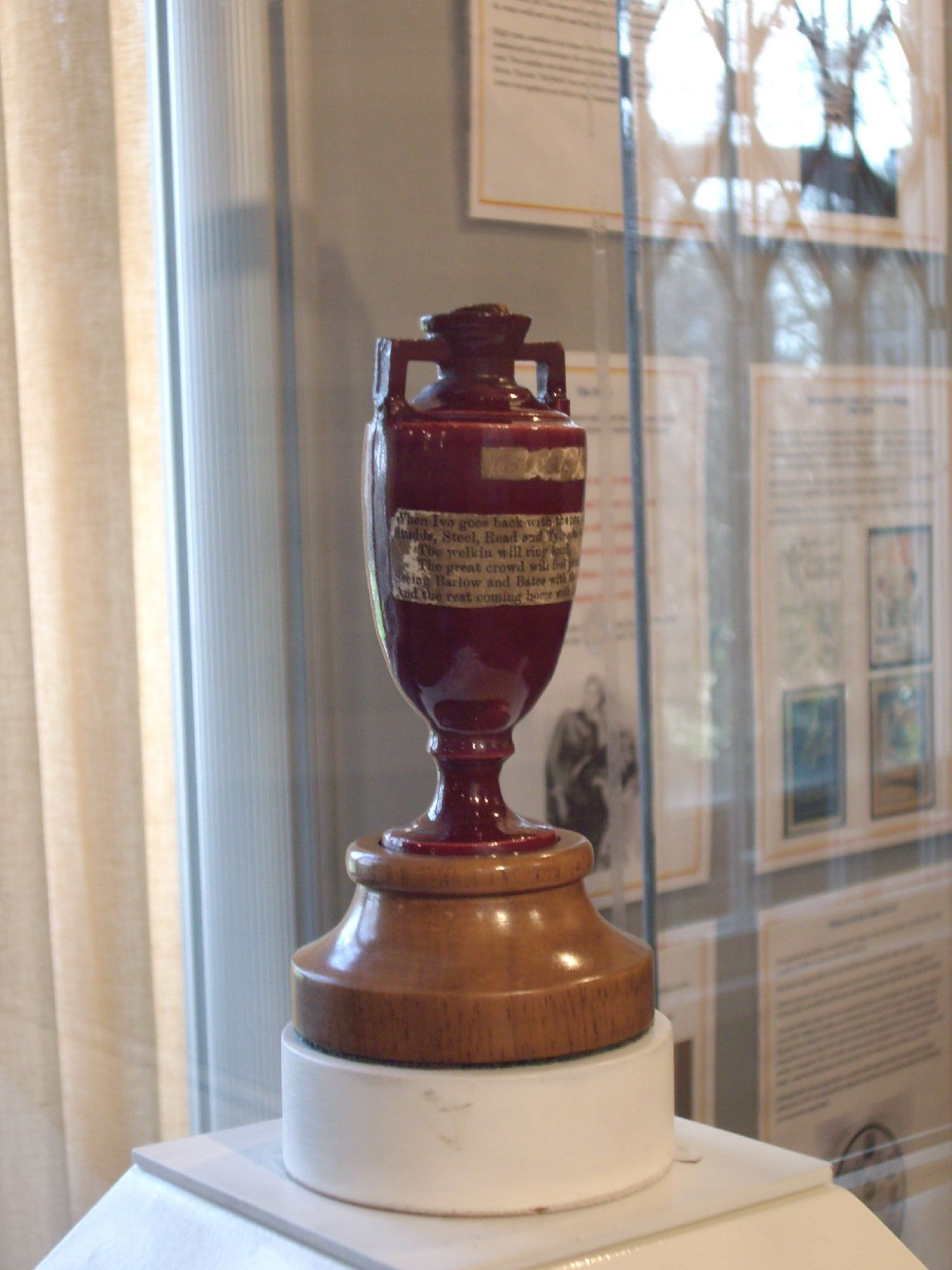
Boycott played 38 Test matches against Australia during Ashes' competitions, scoring 2,945 runs at 47.50, with seven centuries.

During the 1978–79 Ashes series, Boycott unusually went in as a Number 11 in the second innings of a match against South Australia (not due to injury). At Perth on 15 December, he scored 77 runs without hitting a boundary – the highest total of this nature – though it did include an all-run four. England went on to win the six-Test series 5–1, with Boycott struggling overall through three of the Tests with 263 runs at 21.91. Boycott then played in the 1979 Cricket World Cup held in England, taking two wickets in the opening match against Australia, which England won. The hosts then went on to win their next two games and topped their table for the opening round. Reaching the final after a close victory against New Zealand in which Boycott scored only two, he hit 57 from 105 balls as England chased Viv Richards 138 not out-inspired 286 to win, falling 92 runs short at 194 all out. Boycott ended the competition with the sixth highest strike rate of 42.99 and an average of 23.00.

Following the World Cup, against Australia during a Test match at Perth in 1979–80, Boycott became the first man to be marooned on 99 not out in a Test when he ran out of partners. England then toured the West Indies. Here, Boycott again faced the West Indies' feared pace attack, but succeeded in scoring centuries off the likes of Holding, Roberts, Colin Croft and Joel Garner, despite having passed the age of 40 the previous year. Other batsmen, such as David Gower, found the attack difficult to cope with, and the later England captain stated that Boycott often had no sympathy. Boycott was the third most successful batsman, behind Gooch and Gower, during a tour in which England went down 2–0. He scored 70 in the opening match, the only England player to pass 50.

In the third match, in Bridgetown, Barbados, Boycott was to face what was later said to be Holding's greatest over. Boycott was hit on the gloves by the first delivery, played-and-missed the second outside off stump, was hit on the thigh by the third, fended the next two deliveries away with his bat, and was then bowled by the final delivery. Though in 1987 Boycott would claim a 1966 delivery by Gary Sobers to be the best he ever faced in cricket, he noted of Holding's over that "for the first time in my life I can look at a scoreboard with a duck against my name and not feel a profound sense of failure." Boycott led an England fightback in the fourth Test. Having watched Holding's over several times on video, and worked in the nets on his game, Boycott came out and made 38 in the first innings and then hit his twentieth Test century. His career run total was now 7,410, gaining on Gary Sobers' record of 8,032.

He then played in the 1981 Ashes series, despite being aged 40. During the second Test at Lord's Boycott was dismissed 40 short of a hundred by Dennis Lillee, and was "crushed" given that, as it was his hundredth Test match, he wished to score a century. Forever keen on the England captaincy, Boycott's hopes were cut short when Botham's 149 not out secured victory in Boycott's 101st Test match, and Mike Brearley's position as captain was made secure.

During the series, Boycott became concerned with his form and that he may be dropped before he could chase Sobers' record in the upcoming tour of India. He had scored only 10 and 37 in the Fifth Test; in the drawn Sixth Test at The Oval he scored 137, passing Colin Cowdrey's record of 7624 runs and becoming England's highest run-scorer. He ended the series behind only Botham, with 392 runs at 32.66.

=== 'Bye-bye Boycott' ===
Boycott was again refused the captaincy for the next Test series against India over the winter of 1981–82. Angered by this decision, he stated that "even the Yorkshire Ripper got a fair trial in the dock but I've not been given a single chance." He later battled Keith Fletcher over his slow scoring rate, playing Fletcher's comments to him during a press conference using a tape recorder. The series against India was to be his last. In his final ODI match during England's tour he scored 6 from 12 deliveries. During the following Test series he passed Sobers' career run record, hitting 60 in the first Test, 36 and 50 in the second to take him 81 runs short, and in the third Test he overtook the record with a flick off his pads for four. He became the leading Test run-scorer. In his last Test match, the fourth of the tour, taking place in January 1982, he scored 18 and six. During the tour, Boycott said he was too ill to field in a Test Match, but it was later discovered that he was playing golf while his teammates were still out on the field.

This led to Boycott being dropped from the team and forced to return to England, despite apologising via a note to the England dressing room. He said in his autobiography, however, that he went to the golf course following medical advice to get fresh air. Later in 1982 he was instrumental in organising, in defiance of a United Nations and a TCCB ban, a rebel tour of apartheid South Africa by 13 current and former England Test cricketers, who were almost all nearing the end of their careers. All the players were banned from international cricket for three years as a result. By the mid-1980s, with Boycott in good county form and physical shape, there was speculation that he might return to the England team. David Gower, the England captain said that "Geoffrey's been a marvellous servant for England but we have to look to the future and, in view of his age, it wouldn't make an awful lot of sense to pick him again." This was confirmed by the return of Graham Gooch and Tim Robinson's 175 against Australia at Leeds, which prompted Botham, who had once remarked that Boycott was "totally, almost insanely, selfish", to sing 'Bye-bye Boycott' from the England balcony.

== Commentator, controversy and personal life ==
=== Commentating ===
If Geoffrey had played cricket the way he talked he would have had people queuing up to get into the ground instead of queuing up to leave.

— Fred Trueman on Boycott's commentating career in 1993

Cricket commentator and statistician Simon Hughes states that Boycott is fastidious in the commentary box, always immaculately dressed, and never socialises with the other staff. Bill Sinrich, of Trans World International, commented that Boycott "fulfilled all our hopes. He was animated, intelligent, informed, with opinions that got the attention of most people."

Boycott laid claim to coining the phrase "corridor of uncertainty" as a reference to the area outside the off stump where a batsman is unsure whether he should leave or hit the ball, and was noted for using a key to measure the hardness of the pitch, until this was outlawed. He is known for stock phrases including (of dropped catches) that his mother or grandmother "could have caught that in her pinny" or (of an easy batting miss) that they could have "hit the ball with a stick of rhubarb." These phrases inspired much affectionate spoofing of his style.

Boycott was offered a role by Talksport in 1998. He commentated for the station, and for satellite and Asian channels, until 2003. He then returned to commentating of Test matches with Channel 4. In November 2005, Boycott re-joined the BBC's Test Match Special to provide commentary for England's 2005 tour of Pakistan. In January 2006, Boycott joined Asian channel Ten Sports. He delivered the 2005 Colin Cowdrey Lecture, arguing for day-night Test matches.

Boycott worked on Cricket on Five with Mark Nicholas and Simon Hughes as co-commentators, and was a member of the BBC Cricket Team for the 2006/7 Ashes series. His role was to discuss the main talking points. During England's 5–0 whitewash by Australia, Boycott stated that the team were undeserving of their appointments as MBEs, describing these as "a joke".

Boycott has been credited with a high level of influence in the game; Yorkshire's Chief Executive Stewart Regan credited Boycott for completing a deal for Younis Khan to play county cricket for Yorkshire in 2007. On a larger scale, Boycott has worked towards scrapping the rule at Yorkshire regarding the number of overseas players. He stated that he believed the selectors to be living in "past times", and that he wished to encourage a growth in the number of players from Pakistan, the West Indies and India.

His on-air commentary has caused controversy. Boycott has renewed his "pull-no-punches" style. He is known for criticising players, often in a caustic and strident style. In 2005, he mocked the Australian captain Ricky Ponting for electing to bowl first on a batsman-friendly pitch. In 2006, he was initially receptive to the difficulties endured by Marcus Trescothick during his periods of stress-related illness; however, he was not always as amiable.

In 2014, Boycott criticised Indian batsman Gautam Gambhir during India's tour of England when he was dismissed early on, whereas his fellow commentator Michael Vaughan suggested it was premature to pass judgment so early in the match.

Nevertheless, Boycott has enjoyed a successful commentating career, and his opinions are sought across the cricketing media. As well as newspaper columns, Boycott contributes to online blogs, podcasts and question and answer sessions, such as on the BBC News website and CricInfo. He is popular among cricket pundits and biographers, being the subject of three biographies from 1982 to 2000, while his comments are reproduced across cricketing quotes collections. In June 2020, Boycott announced his retirement from Test Match Special, citing the COVID-19 pandemic and his heart surgery as the reasons.

=== Domestic violence and conviction ===
Boycott lived for forty years with Anne Wyatt.

In 1996, a former lover, Margaret Moore, accused Boycott of assault. He denied the charges. He was convicted in his absence at the first trial in January. In the second trial, in October 1998, Boycott was given a three-month suspended sentence by a French magistrates' court, and his £5,300 fine was confirmed.

Boycott maintained his innocence and unsuccessfully appealed the conviction. In 2015, an investigation by the Daily Telegraph alleged that Moore's injury had been caused by a fall, while a separate incident documented in court papers revealed Moore's barrister had demanded £1 million from Boycott in return for her silence. Moore's lack of honesty had been documented in court cases relating to her business. After his conviction, Boycott was dismissed by both BSkyB and BBC Radio, and from his columnist's job in The Sun.

Boycott carried on working overseas, particularly in India. He hosted The Sunny and Boycs Show with Sunil Gavaskar and the touring Indian team at his home in August 2002. Boycott married Rachael Swinglehurst on 26 February 2003. They have a daughter.

=== Throat cancer ===
Boycott commentated for Talksport, and both Indian and South African television networks in 2002, during which he suffered a continual sore throat. Finding a lump while shaving, Boycott returned to England, and on 20 August 2002 was examined at Leeds General Infirmary. By 3 September 2002, he was informed that he had four cancerous tumours in his throat.

Initially, surgeons recommended an eight-hour procedure to remove the tumours; their size and proximity to his voice box eventually persuaded them to recommend radiotherapy, of which Boycott had 35 sessions from 22 October. By December, scans revealed that the majority of the tumours had gone; the final tumour's disappearance was confirmed in early 2003. Although initially reluctant to discuss his health with the public, he spoke privately with his daughter, Emma, and then released a public statement, which evoked an emotional response. On 16 August 2003, he was given a standing ovation by the crowd at Trent Bridge as he and other cricketers did a lap of the ground in vehicles to celebrate Trent Bridge's 50th Test match. In early July 2024, Boycott revealed he had been diagnosed with throat cancer for a second time. He underwent a three-hour operation later that month.

=== Return to commentary ===
Boycott resumed writing for The Daily Telegraph and commentating on Channel Four for the Cheltenham and Gloucester Championship Final and the following summer's cricket. BBC Radio 5 Live then hired Boycott in early 2004. His illness altered his voice and led to a more pleasant personality. In September 2004, Boycott wrote a posthumous tribute to lifelong friend Brian Clough for The Daily Telegraph.

In early 2008, there was speculation that Boycott would be given a role on the England coaching staff, but this came to nothing. He continued commentating for TMS, criticising the England team's approach to the ODI matches under Pietersen in India in November 2008. Also in November, Leo McKinstry published a new biography of Boycott.

On 2 January 2009, Boycott was inducted into the ICC Hall of Fame. He remained an active member of the cricket community, voicing his support in late April 2009 for Pakistan player Saeed Ajmal, and calling for the legalisation of the doosra spin-bowling delivery. In July 2009 he criticised Kevin Pietersen for his captaincy difficulties, and in September he criticised Andrew Flintoff for favouring club cricket over internationals. On 29 November 2009, Boycott was heard swearing on air in an ODI following a catch taken by Paul Collingwood that dismissed Ryan McLaren. The BBC issued an apology for the incident. Having long been nicknamed "Sir Geoffrey", Boycott was given that title when appointed a Knight Bachelor in Theresa May's resignation honours on 10 September 2019. In response to criticism from anti-domestic abuse campaigners about his knighthood, Boycott said that he "does not give a toss".

=== Politics ===
Boycott supported the UK Independence Party and criticised "the way governments of all colours have handed powers to Brussels". He also expressed his support for Conservative Prime Minister Theresa May, saying, "She'll be like Margaret Thatcher, she'll be brilliant."

=== Presidency of Yorkshire, Corridor of Certainty ===
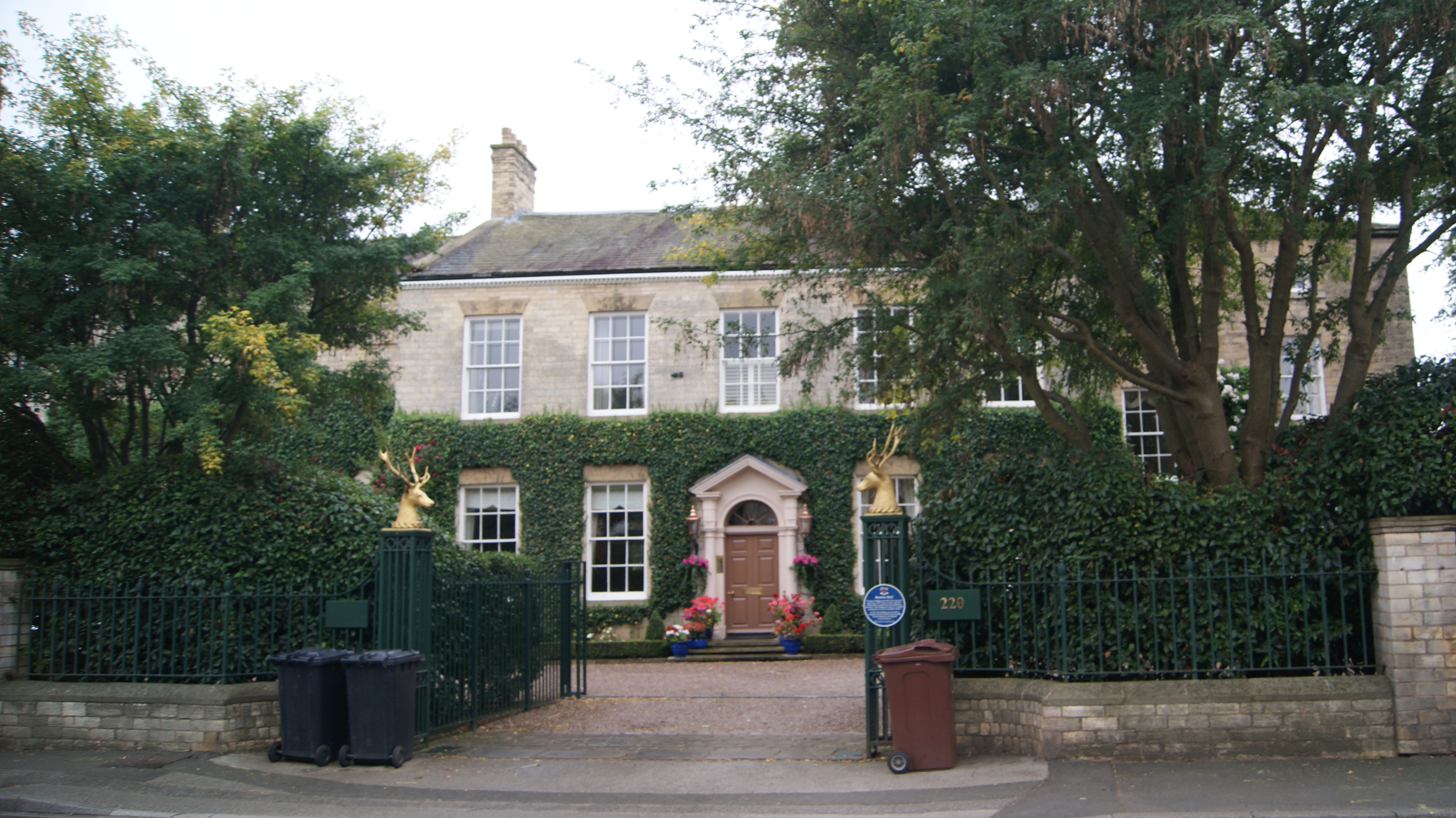
Boston Hall in Boston Spa, the home of Boycott since 2013

In March 2012, Boycott was elected President of Yorkshire County Cricket Club. Elected at an annual meeting, he gained 91.09% of the vote. The election came on the back of Yorkshire's relegation from the first to the second division of the County Championship, the reversal of which Boycott targeted immediately upon taking up the post. He remarked to the media that "The only thing that really matters to the membership is that Yorkshire do well in Championship cricket." His tenure also presided over the club's 150th anniversary in 2013. In February 2014, it was revealed that former Test umpire and Yorkshire player Dickie Bird would replace Boycott.

In March 2013, Boycott and his partner Rachael Swinglehurst purchased the Grade II listed Boston Hall in Boston Spa, West Yorkshire, citing a desire to be closer to family, friends, and Yorkshire County Cricket Club. Later in 2014 he released a book entitled Geoffrey Boycott: The Corridor of Certainty with Simon & Schuster. ESPNcricinfo reviewed the piece in October, commenting on Boycott's more amiable personality since his recovery from cancer: "we have a much more rounded and nuanced book, full of self-awareness and a willingness, even eagerness, to acknowledge errors, failings and regrets... This a complex, driven man, whom we all recognise and admire for his achievements, revealing aspects of his life and survival that have hitherto been kept close to his chest."

== Playing style ==
As I stood at the non-striker's end, I felt a wave of admiration for my partner; wiry, slight, dedicated, a lonely man doing a lonely job all these years.

— Mike Brearley admiring Boycott's talent with the bat in 1979.

Boycott's playing style revolved around intense concentration, solid defence and attention to detail, while avoiding heavy hitting or slogging. He was described in The Complete Encyclopaedia of Cricket as "one of the greatest opening batsmen that the game has known. He dedicated his life to the art of batting, practising assiduously and eschewing any shot that might even hint at threatening the loss of his wicket." Through his Test career, he scored 15.4% of England's runs, and England won 32.41% of the Tests in which Boycott played. This compares with England's 34.76% victory rate over all Test cricket history.

Richard Hutton, Yorkshire and England batsman and son of Len Hutton, described Boycott as a "one-pace player", suggesting that he was unable to alter his playing pace as the match circumstances dictated. Nevertheless, Boycott maintained an "impeccable" defensive technique, and possessed a temperament ideally suited for five-day Test matches. Arlott wrote that "his technique is based on a defence organised as near flawlessness as may be." Boycott remarked in 1981, that: "Given the choice between Raquel Welch and a hundred at Lord's, I'd take the hundred every time." His careful batting is reflected in his 22 centuries for England, of which only two had a strike rate of over 51.00. Former England bowler Frank Tyson wrote in 1987, in The Test Within, that "the greatness of Boycott the batsman and the gaffes of Boycott the man had common roots in an unceasing quest after perfection." Boycott also kept a black book which he used to record bowlers' tendencies.

While this style facilitated his solid defensive play, it inhibited him as a stroke player and made him susceptible to hand and arm injuries, especially his left shoulder, elbow and forearm due to his high elbow to control the bat on defensive strokes. Such injuries would be common throughout his career. One such injury almost required the tip of a broken finger to be amputated. He was occasionally vulnerable to left-arm bowlers, either due to his inability to adjust his line of stroke or because during his career there were few fast left-hand bowlers for him to practise against in the nets. He was never vulnerable to any one particular bowler. Pace bowler Dennis Lillee was the most successful against him in Test matches, with seven dismissals. Gary Sobers also dismissed him seven times, but Lillee did so in fewer matches. Peter Lever, a Test colleague, discussed with Boycott his vulnerability when playing the hook stroke, which was to get him out on more than one occasion. Overall in Test cricket, 54% of Boycott's dismissals were by being caught, with lbw and bowled taking 14% and 16% respectively. Boycott was an occasional medium-pace inswing bowler. He was never a genuine all-rounder, but took seven wickets at Test level at an average of 54.57, often bowling wearing his cap turned back-to-front to assist his vision.

At the start of his career, Boycott was a below average fielder, having received no coaching on this from Yorkshire and with little inclination to rectify it when concentrating on his batting. A fellow Yorkshire batsman Ken Taylor worked with Boycott, who was "limited in [fielding] ability, " but had "tremendous determination". With further help from his two brothers Boycott's fielding improved. He became a safe pair of hands generally at cover point.

== Written works ==
Boycott has written a number of works on cricket, including his own autobiography and a joint project on the biography of umpire Dickie Bird:

- Geoff Boycott's Book for Young Cricketers, 1976.
- Put to the Test, 1979 (with Terry Brindle).
- Opening up, 1980 (with Terry Brindle).
- In The Fast Lane, 1981 (with Terry Brindle).
- Sir Geoffrey. 21 Years of Yorkshire Cricket, 1984.
- Boycott: The Autobiography, 1987 (with Terry Brindle).
- Free as a Bird: Life and Times of Harold "Dickie" Bird with David Hopps, 1997.
- Boycott on Cricket, 1990.
- Geoffrey Boycott on Cricket, 1999.
- The Best XI, 2008
- Geoffrey Boycott: The Corridor of Certainty, 2014
- Being Geoffrey Boycott, 2022

== Records ==
- Wisden, a Cricketer of the Year for 1965, when he played nine Test matches, scoring 617 runs with one century and four fifties at an average of 47.46.
- Winner of the Walter Lawrence Trophy in 1970.

Boycott's average of 56.83 is the highest of the 62 players who nhave accumulated at least 30,000 First Class runs.

== Test matches ==
Boycott's abilities in the Test match theatre during his career of 17 years and 216 days have left him with a number of Test cricket records. He is the seventh most capped player for England in Tests, and has the sixth highest career runs total in Tests for an England player, 8114. He was the fourteenth quickest player to reach 8,000 runs, taking 190 innings.

He topped the national averages for six seasons, the highest of any post-World War II player, and is tied for fourth in the list of centuries for England behind only Joe Root, Alastair Cook and Kevin Pietersen. England were unbeaten in all 22 test matches in which he scored a century (won 10, drawn 12).

Boycott was also the first player to score 99 not out, then 99 and then a century in a Test match. The forty-eight century partnerships he was involved was a record for any England player, but has again been surpassed by Alastair Cook. In 1977 against Australia, Boycott became the first England player to bat on all five days of a Test match on his return to international cricket at Trent Bridge. He spent the 629 minutes at the crease for 191 runs in 1977.

=== Opening partners ===
Such was Boycott's longevity in the game that he had 16 opening partners for England.

Boycott's opening partnerships for England in Test matches
Partner	Innings	Runs	Partnership average	Highest partnership
Dennis Amiss	19	990	55.00	209
Bob Barber	26	1171	46.84	234
Ken Barrington	1	15	—	15*
Mike Brearley	21	874	41.61	185
Alan Butcher	2	88	44.00	45
Colin Cowdrey	2	24	24.00	21
John Edrich	35	1672	52.25	172
Graham Gooch	49	1754	38.13	144
Wayne Larkins	2	61	30.50	61
Brian Luckhurst	12	675	56.25	171
Colin Milburn	6	146	24.33	63
John Murray	2	45	22.50	28
Derek Randall	3	61	20.33	52
Brian Rose	6	133	22.16	39
Eric Russell	3	46	15.33	19
Fred Titmus	2	59	29.50	38

The reason why these figures cover only 191 of Boycott's 193 Test innings is because he batted at No.4 in both innings of the third Test against West Indies at Bridgetown in March 1974 (after Denness, Amiss and Jameson). He opened the batting in the other four Tests in that series.

=== Career performance ===
Boycott's international Test figures for batting and bowling by opposition
		Batting				Bowling			
Opposition	Matches	Runs	Average	High score	100 / 50	Runs	Wickets	Average	Best
Australia	38	2945	47.50	191	7/14	107	2	53.50	2/32
India	13	1084	57.05	246*	4/2	8	0	–	–
New Zealand	15	916	38.16	131	2/6	30	0	–	–
Pakistan	6	591	84.42	121*	3/3	4	0	–	–
South Africa	7	373	37.30	117	1/2	217	5	43.40	3/47
West Indies	29	2205	45.93	128	5/15	16	0	–	–
Overall	108	8114	47.72	246*	22/42	382	7	54.57	3/47

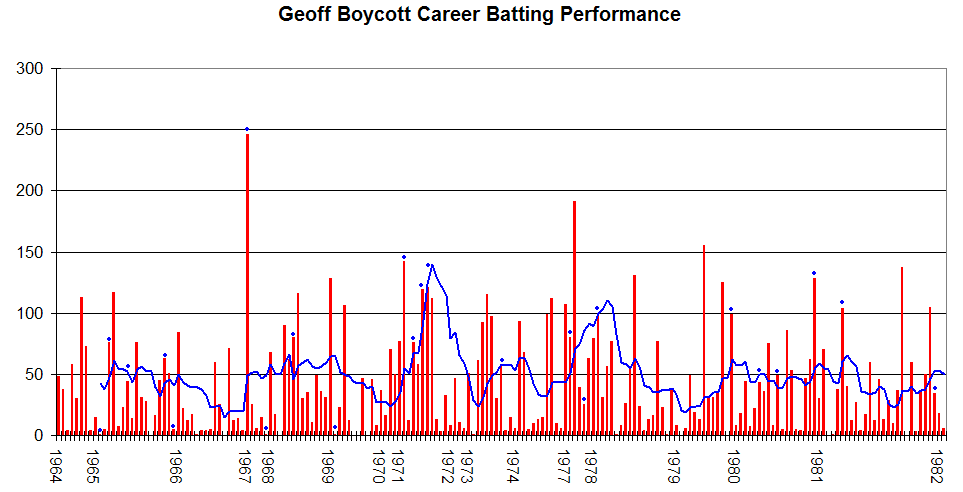
An innings-by-innings breakdown of Boycott's Test match batting career, showing runs scored (red bars) and the average of the last ten innings (blue line). The blue dots indicate an innings where he was not dismissed.

== One-Day Internationals ==
Boycott's ODI career was noticeably less productive than his Test career. He did, however, face the first One-Day International ball ever bowled, and was the first batsman to be dismissed in what was the first ever ODI game. The match, considered a one-off at the time due to ODI cricket being in its infancy, was hastily arranged to cover a washed out 1970–71 Ashes Test.

Career performance:

Boycott's international ODI figures for batting and bowling by opposition
		Batting				Bowling			
Opposition	Matches	Runs	Average	High score	100 / 50	Runs	Wickets	Average	Best
Australia	17	686	52.76	105	1/5	42	2	13.00	2/15
Canada	1	14	–	14*	0/0	3	0	–	–
India	2	11	5.50	6	0/0	–	–	–	–
New Zealand	3	37	12.33	20	0/0	24	1	24.00	1/24
Pakistan	4	27	9.00	18	0/0	14	2	7.00	2/14
West Indies	9	307	34.11	70	0/4	38	0	–	–
Overall	36	1082	36.06	105	1/9	105	5	21.00	2/14

== International centuries ==
Boycott's Test centuries
No.	Score	Against	Pos.	Inn.	Test	Venue	H/A	Date	Result	Ref
1	113	Australia	1	3	5/5	The Oval, London	Home	13 August 1964	Drawn	
2	117	South Africa	1	2	5/5	St George's Park, Port Elizabeth	Away	12 February 1965	Drawn	
3	246 not out	India	2	1	1/3	Headingley, Leeds	Home	8 June 1967	Won	
4	116	West Indies	2	2	5/5	Bourda, Georgetown	Away	28 March 1968	Drawn	
5	128	West Indies	1	1	1/3	Old Trafford, Manchester	Home	12 June 1969	Won	
6	106	West Indies	1	4	2/3	Lord's, London	Home	26 June 1969	Drawn	
7	142 not out	Australia	1	3	4/7	Sydney Cricket Ground, Sydney	Away	9 January 1971	Won	
8	119 not out	Australia	1	3	6/7	Adelaide Oval, Adelaide	Away	29 January 1971	Drawn	
9	121 not out	Pakistan	1	1	2/3	Lord's, London	Home	17 June 1971	Drawn	
10	112	Pakistan	1	1	3/3	Headingley, Leeds	Home	8 July 1971	Won	
11	115	New Zealand	1	2	3/3	Headingley, Leeds	Home	5 July 1973	Won	
12	112	West Indies	1	3	5/5	Queen's Park Oval, Port of Spain	Away	30 March 1974	Won	
13	107	Australia	2	2	3/5	Trent Bridge, Nottingham	Home	28 July 1977	Won	
14	191	Australia	2	1	4/5	Headingley, Leeds	Home	11 August 1977	Won	
15	100 not out	Pakistan	1	4	2/3	Niaz Stadium, Hyderabad	Away	2 January 1978	Drawn	
16	131	New Zealand	2	1	2/3	Trent Bridge, Nottingham	Home	10 August 1978	Won	
17	155	India	2	1	1/4	Edgbaston, Birmingham	Home	12 July 1979	Won	
18	125	India	1	3	4/4	The Oval, London	Home	30 August 1979	Drawn	
19	128 not out	Australia	2	4	1/1	Lord's, London	Home	28 August 1980	Drawn	
20	104 not out	West Indies	2	3	4/5	Antigua Recreation Ground, St. John's	Away	27 March 1981	Drawn	
21	137	Australia	1	2	6/6	The Oval, London	Home	27 August 1981	Drawn	
22	105	India	2	1	3/6	Feroz Shah Kotla, Delhi	Away	23 December 1981	Drawn	

Boycott's one ODI century
No.	Score	Against	Pos.	Inn.	SR	Venue	H/A	Date	Result	Ref
1	105	Australia	2	1	84.67	Sydney Cricket Ground, Sydney	Away	11 December 1979	Won	

== In popular culture ==
Boycott is mentioned in a verse of the Roy Harper song "When an Old Cricketer Leaves the Crease", from the album HQ (1975), though the album was renamed after the song for its release in the United States. The song uses the sport of cricket as a metaphor for death and mentions Boycott alongside another England cricketer from the time, John Snow, both by first name only in the line "And it could be Geoff and it could be John". The song is dedicated to both of them.

In 1984 Boycott was the subject of a documentary in the BBC 2 "Forty Minutes" strand (series 3 Episode 26). It looked at the in-fight at Yorkshire County Cricket Club, the sacking & the eventual reinstating of Boycott at the special EGM in Harrogate. Producer Andy Stevenson tells the story with archive footage and interviews with many interested parties. In 1987 Andrew Nickolds dramatized the events in "Our Geoff" with Patrick Malahide in the lead role. Both the play & the documentary used the song "Boycs Will Be Boycs" as the theme music.

== Honours ==
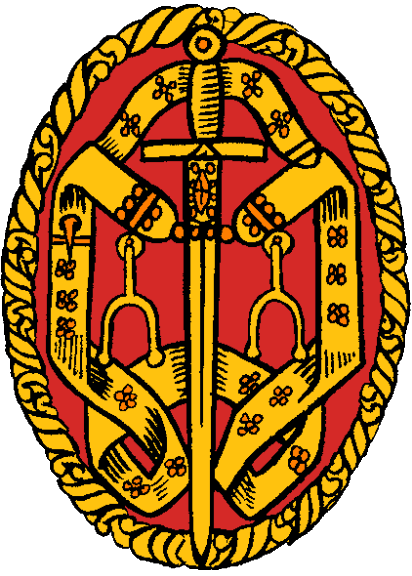
Insignia of a Knight Bachelor

- Boycott was made an Officer of the Order of the British Empire (OBE) in the Civil Division in the 1980 Birthday Honours "for services to Cricket".
- He was knighted in the 2019 Resignation Honours of Theresa May.
- He was awarded honorary life membership of the Marylebone Cricket Club in 1993.
- He was president of Yorkshire County Cricket Club between 2012 and 2014.
- He was awarded an honorary doctorate of Sports Science by Leeds Metropolitan University on 20 July 2010.

== Notes ==
Preceded by Mike Brearley	English national cricket captain (deputised 1977–78)	Succeeded by Mike Brearley
