= Wayne Larkins =

English cricketer (1953–2025)

Personal information
- Born: 22 November 1953; Roxton, Bedfordshire, England
- Died: 28 June 2025 (aged 71); Coventry, West Midlands, England
- Nickname: Ned
- Height: 5 ft 11 in (1.80 m)
- Batting: Right-handed
- Bowling: Right-arm medium
- Role: Batsman

International information
- National side: England
- Test debut (cap 484): 1 February 1980 v Australia
- Last Test: 4 January 1991 v Australia
- ODI debut (cap 50): 20 June 1979 v New Zealand
- Last ODI: 10 January 1991 v Australia

Domestic team information
- Years: Team
- 1972–1991: Northamptonshire
- 1982/83–1983/84: Eastern Province
- 1992–1995: Durham
- 1996–2000: Bedfordshire
- 2001: Huntingdonshire

Career statistics
Competition	Test	ODI	FC	LA
Matches	13	25	482	485
Runs scored	493	591	27,142	13,594
Batting average	20.54	24.62	34.44	30.75
100s/50s	0/3	1/0	59/116	26/66
Top score	64	124	252	172*
Balls bowled	–	15	3,517	3,202
Wickets	–	–	42	77
Bowling average	–	–	45.59	31.62
5 wickets in innings	–	–	1	1
10 wickets in match	–	–	0	0
Best bowling	–	–	5/59	5/32
Catches/stumpings	8/–	8/–	306/–	160/–
Medal record
Men's Cricket
Representing England
ICC Cricket World Cup
Runner-up	1979 England
- Source: Cricinfo, 11 July 2009
Association football career
Youth career
- Notts County
Senior career*
Years	Team	Apps	(Gls)
- Wolverton Town
- Wellingborough Town
1984–1986	Buckingham Town		
- * Club domestic league appearances and goals

Wayne Larkins (22 November 1953 – 28 June 2025) was an English cricketer who represented Northamptonshire, Durham and Bedfordshire as an opening batsman at various times during his career. He was selected to play for England as Graham Gooch's opening partner on tours of Australia and the West Indies. He was also a semi-professional footballer. He was a part of the England squad who finished as runners-up at the 1979 Cricket World Cup.

== Cricket ==
=== County career ===
Born in Roxton, Bedfordshire, on 22 November 1953, Larkins played cricket for Northamptonshire from 1972 until 1991. He moved to first-class newcomer Durham in 1992, retiring from the first-class game in 1995. He scored 27,142 first-class runs in 482 matches, with 59 centuries and a highest score of 252. He also snared 42 wickets with his medium pace. He was a strong force in domestic one-day cricket, playing 485 matches and scoring 13,594 runs with 26 hundreds.

He was part of the unlucky Northamptonshire side who were narrowly defeated in the final of both major domestic knock-out tournaments in 1987, the Benson & Hedges Cup and the NatWest Trophy. In the latter, Larkins top-scored but still finished on the losing side as Richard Hadlee engineered an unlikely successful run chase for Nottinghamshire. He did, however, finish on the winning side in the Benson & Hedges Cup final of 1980.

=== International career ===
Larkins first achieved England recognition during the 1979 Cricket World Cup. As England progressed through the tournament, they decided to gamble on lengthening their batting line-up by bringing in Larkins instead of a specialist bowler or allrounder such as Geoff Miller or Phil Edmonds. This meant, under the competition's rules, that Larkins, Graham Gooch and Geoff Boycott – all part-time bowlers – would probably have to bowl 12 overs between them per match. This gamble paid off in the semi-final, in which England beat New Zealand narrowly, but failed in the final, in which England lost to the West Indies and Larkins had a miserable match.

He made his Test debut in Australia the following winter. By the end of 1981, he had played six Tests but not been given an extended run in the side and had had limited success. He decided the following winter to join the first rebel tour of South Africa alongside Gooch and Boycott. This meant that he was banned from international cricket for three years. Once the ban had been served, he was recalled into the England squad for the third Test against India in 1986—but had to pull out through injury, and was replaced by Mark Benson.

Larkins did not receive another chance until 1989–90, ten years after his international debut. Ironically, this opportunity was created by rival batsmen being suspended due to a further rebel tour. Initially, he was recalled for the Nehru Cup of 1989–90. In his second game back, he played his best international innings (and only international century), in a one day international victory over Allan Border's Australia, and in the process won the man of the match award. Wisden observed that Larkins' "strokeplay" on this occasion was "both powerful and subtle. His previous highest in a one-day international was 34 in 1979–80: now he dominated an opening stand of 185 with Gooch, hit two sixes and nineteen fours in his 124, and justified his recall to the England team after an absence of eight years". In his first Test match back, eight-and-a-half years since his previous Test, against the West Indies, he opened alongside Gooch—and to Larkins fell the honour of scoring the winning run as England beat the West Indies in a Test match for the first time in sixteen years.

Larkins also toured Australia and New Zealand the following winter again under Gooch's captaincy, but enjoyed limited success and never again finished on the winning side in a Test match. In all Larkins appeared in thirteen Test matches for England, scoring three fifties, and in twenty-five ODIs, where he made one century.

=== Legacy ===
Although a talented player, Larkins was considered as something of an underachiever at the top level. County bowlers such as Jonathan Agnew spoke on TMS to Phil Tufnell during the second Ashes test June 2023 of being "Nedded" when he performed well against them. The cricket correspondent Colin Bateman opined that "Larkins was usually ignored when he should have been selected and selected when he should have been ignored in a career of unfulfilled potential. A destructive opening bat who could demolish any attack if he got going, 'Ned' tired of waiting for England and joined the 1982 rebel tour to South Africa".

== Football ==
Outside cricket, he was a keen footballer. In his youth, he had been on the books of Notts County. He also played non-league football for Wolverton Town, Wellingborough Town and Buckingham Town. He missed the start of the 1986 cricket season as a result of an ankle injury caused by a collision with a goalkeeper whilst playing for Buckingham.

== Mortgage controversy ==
In October 2006, Larkins pleaded guilty to attempting to illegally obtain a mortgage secured against the house of his girlfriend's sick father.
With his girlfriend Deborah Lines, he bought a home in France. On 20 April 2007, he was given a 12-month suspended sentence, and was ordered to repay money from the sale of the property.

== Death ==
Larkins died from heart failure in Coventry, on 28 June 2025, at the age of 71.
