= Australian XI in South Africa in 1985–86 =

International cricket tour

	South Africa	Australian XI
- Dates: 9 November 1985 – 5 February 1986
Captains	Clive Rice	Kim Hughes

Test series
- Result: South Africa won the 3-match series 1–0
Most runs	Graeme Pollock (280)	Kim Hughes (205)
Most wickets	Garth Le Roux (11)	Carl Rackemann (28)

One Day International series
- Results: South Africa won the 6-match series 4–2
Most runs	Clive Rice (344)	John Dyson (285)
Most wickets	Garth Le Roux (13)	Carl Rackemann (10)

From November 1985 to February 1986, a representative team of Australian cricket players undertook a so-called "Rebel tour" to South Africa, to play a series of matches against the South African team. At the time, the International Cricket Conference had placed a moratorium on international cricket teams undertaking tours of the country, due to the South African government's policy of apartheid, leaving South Africa with no international competition.

== Background ==
During the 1980s, the International Cricket Conference (ICC) placed a ban on its members undertaking tours of South Africa in line with the international sporting community's overall boycott. As a means of obtaining quality opposition for the South African cricket team, groups of players from different countries had been approached privately by the governing body of cricket in South Africa to undertake so-called "rebel tours" of the country. The players that accepted the offer did so in the knowledge that they would likely receive significant sanctions from both their own country's governing body and the ICC. The first tour took place in 1982, when an English side spent four weeks in South Africa. Teams representing both Sri Lanka and the West Indies had subsequently made the trip before, in late 1985, the first Australian side was recruited to make a tour.

== Squads ==
South Africa	(Australia) Australian XI
Clive Rice (c); Ray Jennings (wk); Jimmy Cook; Peter Kirsten; Graeme Pollock; Alan Kourie; Garth Le Roux; Stephen Jefferies; Henry Fotheringham; Roy Pienaar; Tim Shaw; Eric Simons; Corrie van Zyl; Hugh Page; Kevin McKenzie; Robert Bentley; Ken McEwan; Anthonie Ferreira; Lee Barnard	Kim Hughes (c); Steve Rixon (wk); Greg Shipperd (wk); Terry Alderman; John Dyson; Peter Faulkner; Mike Haysman; Tom Hogan; Rodney Hogg; Trevor Hohns; John Maguire; Rod McCurdy; Carl Rackemann; Steve B. Smith; Mick Taylor; Graham Yallop

The tour was organised by former Australian test batsman Bruce Francis at the behest of the South African cricket board, then led by Ali Bacher. Bacher had planned to invite an Australian team as early as December 1981, but it was July 1984 before Francis approached any players, and October of that year before a meeting was held to plan the tour.

Original players signed for the tour included:

- Batsmen – Graham Yallop, Steve Smith, Graeme Wood, Wayne B. Phillips, Andrew Hilditch, Dirk Wellham, John Dyson
- Fast bowlers – Terry Alderman, Carl Rackemann, John Maguire, Rod McCurdy, Rodney Hogg
- Spin bowlers – Tom Hogan, Murray Bennett
- All-rounder – Peter Faulkner
- Wicket-keeper – Steve Rixon

Several players seriously considered joining the tour, including David Hookes and Jeff Thomson, but demanded too much money. Other players were never considered, such as Geoff Lawson, Kim Hughes and Allan Border.

Out of the initial players to sign, only Peter Faulkner and Rod McCurdy (who had represented Australia only in One-Day Internationals) had never represented Australia in Test matches. Several were in the Australian team when they signed to go to South Africa and a number of these players were selected for the 1985 tour to England, including Wood, Phillips, Hilditch, Wellham, Alderman, Rixon, Bennett and Rackemann. News of the rebel tour broke before this squad left for England.

=== Withdrawals ===
Murray Bennett pulled out of the tour after having second thoughts and being selected for Australia over the 1984–85 summer. Phillips, Wood and Wellham pulled out after a financial inducement from Kerry Packer; Packer also tried to get Steve Smith to change his mind but Smith refused. Hilditch also pulled out after being selected for the Australian team over the 84–85 summer.

Francis signed up several new players including Trevor Hohns, Greg Shipperd, Mick Taylor and Mike Haysman. The tour received its biggest boost in early 1985 when Kim Hughes, who had been dropped from the Australian team, met with Bacher and Francis, agreed to tour and captain the side.

== Matches ==
The tour was scheduled to last for three months, with the touring side arriving in South Africa in November 1985, and the last game scheduled for the start of February 1986. Included on the itinerary was a three match "Test" series and six one-day games, as well as seventeen tour matches against various provincial and other opponents.

=== Tour matches ===
==== One-day matches against Country Districts teams ====
Dates	Opponent	Venue	Result
9 November 1985	Northern Transvaal Country Districts	Lowveld Country Club, Nelspruit	No Result
10 November 1985	Northern Transvaal Country Districts	Lowveld Country Club, Nelspruit	Australian XI won by 152 runs
16 November 1985	Orange Free State Country Districts	Harvinia Ground, Virginia	Australian XI won by 208 runs
18 November 1985	Transvaal Country Districts	Victory Park, Orkney	Australian XI won by 49 runs

==== Three-day matches ====
22 - 25 November 1985
Scorecard

Australian XI (Australia)	v	Orange Free State
345/8 d (104.4 overs); J Dyson 141; CJPG van Zyl 3/55 (26.4 overs)		319 (85.5 overs); BC Broad 88; RJ McCurdy 4/85 (24 overs)
301/5 d (77.4 overs); MD Taylor 102*; AP Beukes 3/106 (23.4 overs)		76/1 (23 overs); AM Green 46*; TM Alderman 1/43 (11 overs)

Match Drawn
Ramblers Cricket Club Ground, Bloemfontein
Umpires: Graham Brown (SA) and Darrell Scheepers (SA)

- Australian XI won the toss and elected to bat

29 November - 2 December 1985
Scorecard

SA Board President's XI (South Africa)	v	(Australia) Australian XI
150 (48.5 overs); TR Madsen 54; RM Hogg 3/44 (13 overs); TM Alderman 3/23 (10.5 overs); JN Maguire 3/41 (15 overs)		186 (77.4 overs); KJ Hughes 73; CJPG van Zyl 3/29 (18 overs); EO Simons 3/34 (12.4 overs)
126 (38.2 overs); PG Amm 20; JN Maguire 5/58 (14.2 overs)		91/5 (28.1 overs); J Dyson 28; EO Simons 3/39 (8 overs)

Australian XI won by five wickets
Berea Park, Pretoria
Umpires: Denzil Bezuidenhout (SA) and Oswald Schoof (SA)

- SA Board President's XI won the toss and elected to bat

6 - 8 December 1985
Scorecard

Border	v	(Australia) Australian XI
168 (45.2 overs); EN Trotman 48; JN Maguire 5/62 (18 overs)		236/8 (98 overs); J Dyson 62; T Hardiman 2/48 (14 overs); EN Trotman 2/33 (20 overs); GL Long 2/40 (17 overs)

Match drawn
Jan Smuts Ground, East London
Umpires: Dudley Schoof (SA) and Desmond Sansom (SA)

- Border won the toss and elected to bat
- Only three hours play on Day 1 and no play on Day 3

13 - 15 December 1985
Scorecard

Australian XI (Australia)	v	Eastern Province
382/9 d (120.4 overs); MD Haysman 125*; TG Shaw 4/116 (39 overs)		235 (85.4 overs); RLS Armitage 98*; TG Hogan 8/86 (40 overs)
101/1 d (34 overs); J Dyson 71*; MK van Vuuren 1/24 (8 overs)		250/8 (54.4 overs); DJ Richardson 64; RM Hogg 4/70 (23 overs)

Eastern Province won by two wickets
St George's Park, Port Elizabeth
Umpires: Louis Rautenback (SA) and Carl Coetzee (SA)

- Australian XI won the toss and elected to bat

17 - 19 December 1985
Scorecard

Boland	v	(Australia) Australian XI
271 (94.4 overs); SA Jones 132; TV Hohns3/69 (25 overs)		456/9 d (155 overs); KJ Hughes 116; P Anker 4/126 (45 overs)
159/6 (73 overs); NM Lambrechts 52*; JN Maguire 2/20 (14 overs); TG Hogan 2/34 (22 overs)

Match drawn
Oude Libertas, Stellenbosch Farmers Winery Ground, Stellenbosch
Umpires: Herbert Martin (SA) and Willem Richard (SA)

- Boland won the toss and elected to bat

6 - 8 January 1986
Scorecard

South African Universities (South Africa)	v	(Australia) Australian XI
219/9 d (83.1 overs); TG Shaw 66; PI Faulkner 3/45 (17 overs)		220 (76 overs); MD Taylor 43; BA Matthews 4/43 (26 overs)
237/5 d (76 overs); RF Pienaar 82; TM Alderman 2/33 (17 overs)		203/9 (53 overs); MD Taylor 70; PA Rayment 4/62 (17 overs)

Match drawn
St George's Park, Port Elizabeth
Umpires: James Peacock (SA) and Louis Rautenbach (SA)

- South African Universities won the toss and elected to bat

==== One-day matches ====
27 November 1985
Scorecard

Northern Transvaal; 211/9 (50 overs)	v	(Australia) Australian XI; 204 (49.2 overs)
AM Ferreira 61; RM Hogg 3/37 (10 overs)		KJ Hughes 72; AM Ferreira 3/36 (9.2 overs)

Northern Transvaal won by 7 runs
Tshwane University of Technology Oval, Pretoria
Umpires: George Baker (SA) and Pierre Klerk (SA)

- Australian XI won the toss and elected to field

=== Unofficial "Test" matches ===
The series of three "Test" matches was won 1–0 by South Africa, after the first two matches were drawn and the home team were victorious in the third. In the third match, the Australians were bowled out for 61 in their 2nd innings, while chasing 250 to win, when both Clive Rice and Garth Le Roux took hat-tricks. As of 2022, two bowlers taking a hat-trick in the same innings has never occurred in official Test matches. The players of the series were Carl Rackemann for Australia and Clive Rice for South Africa.

==== First "Test" ====
26–29 December 1985
Scorecard

South Africa	v	Australia XI
393 (119.1 overs); RG Pollock 108; RM Hogg 5/83 (32 overs); CG Rackemann 5/112 (42.1 overs)		359 (119.3 overs); Mick Taylor 109; ST Jefferies 4/100 (34 overs)
203/7d (63.4 overs); HR Fotheringham 100*; CG Rackemann 3/28 (15 overs)		32/2 (11 overs); KJ Hughes 17*

Match drawn
Kingsmead, Durban
Umpires: DH Bezuidenhout (SA) and OR Schoof (SA)
Player of the match: RM Hogg, CG Rackemann, SJ Rixon (AUS), HR Fotheringham (SA)

- South Africa won the toss and elected to bat

==== Second "Test" ====
1–4 January 1986
Scorecard

South Africa	v	(Australia) Australian XI
430 (126.2 overs); SJ Cook 91; CG Rackemann 4/117 (37.2 overs); RJ McCurdy 4/127 (30 overs)		304 (98.3 overs); J Dyson 95; GS Le Roux 4/51 (20.3 overs)
202/5d (52 overs); SJ Cook 70; CG Rackemann 4/105 (26 overs)		224/4 (90 overs); KJ Hughes 97*

Match drawn
Newlands, Cape Town
Umpires: DA Sansom (SA) and DD Schoof (SA)
Player of the match: KJ Hughes, CG Rackemann (AUS), SJ Cook (SA)

- South Africa won the toss and elected to bat

==== Third "Test" ====
16–21 January 1986
Scorecard

South Africa	v	Australia XI
211 (71.4 overs); KA McKenzie 72; CG Rackemann 8/84 (26.4 overs)		267 (106.3 overs); SB Smith 116; CJPG van Zyl 4/82 (27 overs)
305 (86.1 overs); KA McKenzie 110; CG Rackemann 4/106 (30.1 overs); TM Alderman 4/112 (37 overs)		61 (28.4 overs); J Dyson 18*; CEB Rice 3/8 (6 overs); GS Le Roux 3/11 (7 overs); HA Page 3/19 (7.4 overs)

South Africa won by 188 runs
Wanderers, Johannesburg
Umpires: DD Schoof (SA) and OR Schoof (SA)
Player of the match: SJ Rixon, CG Rackemann (AUS), KA McKenzie (SA)

- Australia won the toss and elected to field

=== One-day series ===
There were six one-day matches: the Australians started well by winning the first two games, but the South Africans recovered and ultimately won the series 4–2.

==== First match ====
24 January 1986
Scorecard

Australian XI (Australia); 197/5 (50 overs)	v	South Africa; 151 (41.5 overs)
J Dyson 57; CEB Rice 3/28 (10 overs)		RM Bentley 35; TG Hogan 3/25 (9.5 overs)

Australian XI won by 46 runs
Wanderers, Johannesburg
Umpires: FE Wood (SA) and OR Schoof (SA)
Player of the match: SB Smith, MD Haysman (AUS), CEB Rice (SA)

- Australian XI won the toss and elected to bat

==== Second match ====
26 January 1986
Scorecard

South Africa; 221/6 (50 overs)	v	Australian XI (Australia); 224/6 (49.3 overs)
CEB Rice 91; TM Alderman 3/28 (10 overs)		SB Smith 70; HA Page 2/33 (10 overs)

Australian XI won by 4 wickets
Kingsmead, Durban
Umpires: LJ Rautenbach (SA) and DA Sansom (SA)
Player of the match: SB Smith, MD Haysman (AUS), CEB Rice (SA)

- Australian XI won the toss and elected to bat

==== Third match ====
28 January 1986
Scorecard

South Africa; 223/9 (50 overs)	v	Australian XI (Australia); 151 (40.1 overs)
CEB Rice 78*; CG Rackemann 3/39 (10 overs)		MD Taylor 43; GS Le Roux 5/13 (8.1 overs)

South Africa won by 72 runs
St George's Park, Port Elizabeth
Umpires: DH Bezuidenhout (SA) and DD Schoof (SA)
Player of the match: MD Taylor (AUS), GS Le Roux, CEB Rice (SA)

- South Africa won the toss and elected to bat

==== Fourth match ====
30 January 1986
Scorecard

South Africa; 234/9 (50 overs)	v	Australian XI (Australia); 210 (49 overs)
CEB Rice 44; TM Alderman 3/30 (10 overs)		KJ Hughes 60; CEB Rice 4/45 (10 overs)

South Africa won by 24 runs
Newlands, Cape Town
Umpires: LJ Rautenbach (SA) and OR Schoof (SA)
Player of the match: TM Alderman, KJ Hughes (AUS), SJ Cook (SA)

- South Africa won the toss and elected to bat

==== Fifth match ====
1 February 1986
Scorecard

Australian XI (Australia); 185/7 (49 overs)	v	South Africa; 189/5 (39.4 overs)
GN Yallop 42; AM Ferreira 3/31 (10 overs)		HR Fotheringham 43; JN Macguire 2/54 (10 overs)

South Africa won by 5 wickets
Wanderers, Johannesburg
Umpires: DH Bezuidenhout (SA) and FE Wood (SA)
Player of the match: G Shipperd (AUS), AM Ferreira, CEB Rice (SA)

- South Africa won the toss and elected to field
- Match reduced to 49 overs per side

==== Sixth match ====
5 February 1986
Scorecard

Australian XI (Australia); 272/6 (50 overs)	v	South Africa; 273/4 (48.2 overs)
J Dyson 115; AM Ferreira 2/52 (10 overs); CEB Rice 2/54 (10 overs)		CEB Rice 95*; CG Rackemann 2/52 (10 overs)

South Africa won by 6 wickets
Berea Park, Pretoria
Umpires: LJ Rautenbach (SA) and OR Schoof (SA)
Player of the match: CG Rackemann (AUS), KS McEwan, CEB Rice (SA)

- South Africa won the toss and elected to field

== Aftermath ==
The series was highly controversial in Australia and its Australian participants were banned from interstate cricket for two seasons and international cricket for three seasons. Many of the players returned to South Africa for a second tour the following year.

Alderman, Rixon, Rackemann, Maguire and McCurdy lost their chance to tour England in 1985 by sticking to their agreement to tour South Africa.
