= Australian XI in South Africa in 1986–87 =

	South Africa	Australian XI
- Dates: 21 November 1986 – 18 February 1987
Captains	Clive Rice	Kim Hughes

Test series
- Result: South Africa won the 4-match series 1–0
Most runs	Peter Kirsten (391)	Steve Smith (399)
Most wickets	Garth Le Roux (17)	Rod McCurdy (15)

One Day International series
- Results: South Africa won the 8-match series 5–2
Most runs	Jimmy Cook (283)	Kepler Wessels (326)
Most wickets	Garth Le Roux (13)	Peter Faulkner (8); Rod McCurdy (8)

An unofficial Australian cricket team toured South Africa in the 1986–87 season to play a series of unofficial Test and one day matches. It was the second of two tours by the side, the first being in 1985–86. The series was highly controversial in Australia and its Australian participants were banned from interstate cricket for two seasons and international cricket for three seasons.

== Australian squad ==
The squad consisted of the following:

- Batsmen – Kim Hughes, Graham Yallop, Steve Smith, John Dyson, Mick Taylor, Mike Haysman, Kepler Wessels, Greg Shipperd (reserve keeper)
- Fast bowlers – Terry Alderman, Carl Rackemann, John Maguire, Rod McCurdy, Rodney Hogg
- Spin bowlers – Tom Hogan, Trevor Hohns
- All-rounder – Peter Faulkner
- Wicket-keeper – Steve Rixon

== Matches ==
=== Unofficial "Test" matches ===
A series of four unofficial "Test" matches were scheduled. As happened the previous year the series was won 1–0 by South Africa, who won the opening match in Johannesburg, while the three remaining matches were all drawn.

==== First "Test" ====
24–28 December 1986
Scorecard

South Africa	v	Australia XI
254 (88.5 overs); CEB Rice 61; RJ McCurdy 6/67 (24.5 overs)		142 (63 overs); KJ Hughes 34; CEB Rice 4/19 (16 overs)
182 (69.4 overs); KA McKenzie 40; JN Macguire 6/61 (29 overs)		245 (95.1 overs); KJ Hughes 54*; CEB Rice 3/37 (18.1 overs); BM McMillan 3/44 (15 overs)

South Africa won by 49 runs
Wanderers, Johannesburg
Umpires: DD Schoof (SA) and FE Wood (SA)

- Australian XI won the toss and elected to field

==== Second "Test" ====
1–6 January 1987
Scorecard

South Africa	v	Australia XI
493 (157.4 overs); PN Kirsten 173; JN Macguire 4/116 (46.4 overs)		496 (202 overs); J Dyson 198; MD Haysman 153; GS Le Roux 5/85 (42 overs)
257/3 (86 overs); PN Kirsten 105*

Match drawn
Newlands, Cape Town
Umpires: DH Bezuidenhout and OR Schoof (SA)
Player of the match: PN Kirsten (SA)

- Australian XI won the toss and elected to field

==== Third "Test" ====
17–22 January 1987
Scorecard

Australia XI	v	South Africa
264 (88.3 overs); SB Smith 137; GS Le Roux 4/33 (13.3 overs)		350 (125.4 overs); KS McEwan 101; TV Hohns 6/98 (47.4 overs)
339 (140.4 overs); MD Haysman 115; J Dyson 101; HA Page 3/87 (35 overs)		143/7 (57.5 overs); PN Kirsten 33; TV Hohns 3/27 (17.5 overs); RM Hogg 3/33 (16 overs)

Match drawn
Kingsmead, Durban
Umpires: K Liebenberg and LJ Rautenbach (SA)
Player of the match: TV Hohns (AUS)

- Australia won the toss and elected to bat

==== Fourth "Test" ====
30 January–4 February 1987
Scorecard

Australia XI	v	South Africa
455/9d (163.5 overs); KC Wessels 135; AA Donald 3/94 (32 overs); O Henry 3/96 (36.5 overs)		533 (167.2 overs); RG Pollock 144; KS McEwan 138*; RM Hogg 5/97 (39 overs)
333/4 (116 overs); SB Smith 113; KC Wessels 105*; GS Le Roux 2/61 (16 overs)

Match drawn
St George's Park, Port Elizabeth
Umpires: K Liebenberg and DD Schoof (SA)
Player of the match: KC Wessels (AUS)

- South Africa won the toss and elected to field

== Legacy ==
A number of tourists on this "rebel" tour went on to play first-class cricket in South Africa, including Kim Hughes, Steve Smith, Mike Haysman, Rod McCurdy and John Maguire; McCurdy and Haysman wound up moving there permanently. South African-born Kepler Wessels, who had been playing in Australia since 1978, returned to the country of his birth, ultimately becoming its first captain upon their return to official Test cricket in 1992.
