= List of international cricket five-wicket hauls by Malcolm Marshall =

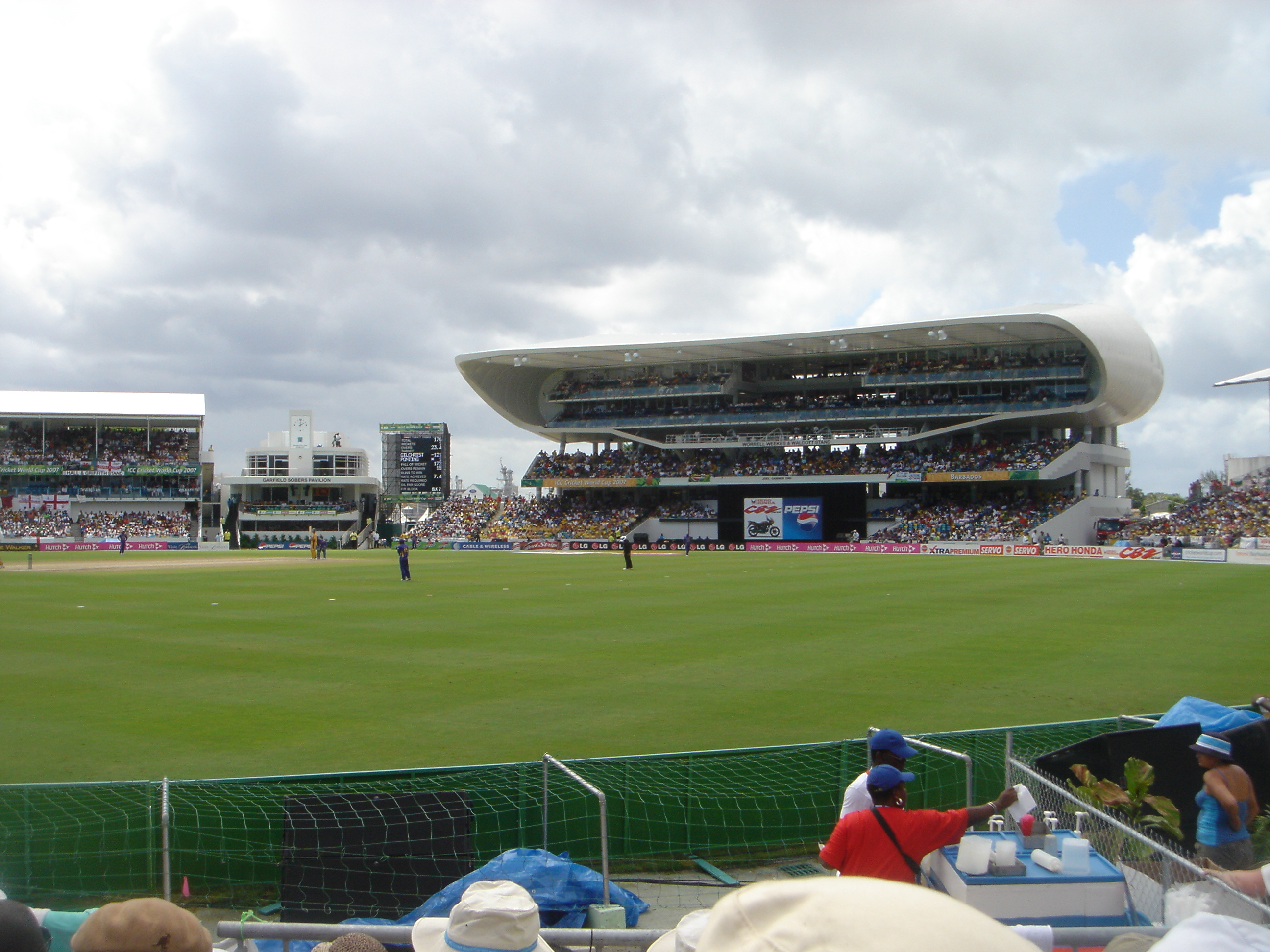
The Kensington Oval, where Marshall took four of his five-wicket hauls, the most by any player at the ground

Malcolm Marshall, a former right-arm fast bowler, represented the West Indies cricket team in 81 Tests between 1978 and 1992. In cricket, a five-wicket haul (also known as a "five–for" or "fifer") refers to a bowler taking five or more wickets in a single innings. This is regarded as a notable achievement, and as of October 2024, only 54 bowlers have taken 15 or more five-wicket hauls at international level in their cricketing careers. In Test cricket, Marshall took 376 wickets, including 22 five-wicket hauls. The cricket almanack Wisden described him as "one of the greatest fast bowlers of all time", and named him one of their Cricketers of the Year in 1983. He was inducted into the ICC Cricket Hall of Fame as an inaugural member in January 2009. (Note: The International Cricket Council is abbreviated as ICC.) Mark Nicholas, a cricket commentator, once wrote that former Pakistan captain, Imran Khan, "calls Malcolm the greatest of all fast bowlers".

Marshall made his Test debut in December 1978 against India at the Karnataka State Cricket Association Stadium, Bangalore. (Note: Karnataka State Cricket Association Stadium has since been renamed the M. Chinnaswamy Stadium.) His first five-wicket haul came in March 1983 against the same team at the Queen's Park Oval, Port of Spain; he took 5 wickets for 37 runs. In December 1984, against Australia at the Adelaide Oval, he took a five-wicket haul in both innings of a Test match for the first time. He repeated this feat once more in his career, against India at the Queen's Park Oval in April 1989. Marshall's career-best bowling figures for an innings were 7 wickets for 22 runs against England at Old Trafford, Manchester, in June 1988. He took 9 wickets for 41 runs in the match; West Indies won the match by an innings and 156 runs, and he was awarded man of the match for his performance. Marshall was most successful against Australia taking seven five-wicket hauls. He took ten or more wickets in a match on four occasions.

Marshall made his One Day International (ODI) debut against England at Headingley, Leeds, during the 1980 Prudential Trophy. He never took a five-wicket haul in ODIs; his career-best figures for an innings were 4 wickets for 18 runs against Australia in 1991, a match West Indies lost at the Melbourne Cricket Ground. As of 2013, Marshall is sixteenth overall among all-time combined five-wicket haul takers. (Note: Marshall shares the position with Allan Donald, Makhaya Ntini, Daniel Vettori and Dale Steyn.)

== Key ==
Symbol	Meaning
Date	Date the match was held, or starting date of the match for Test matches
Inn	The innings of the match in which the five-wicket haul was taken
Overs	Number of overs bowled in that innings
Runs	Runs conceded
Wkts	Number of wickets taken
Econ	Bowling economy rate (average runs per over)
Batsmen	The batsmen whose wickets were taken in the five-wicket haul
Result	The result for the West Indies team in that match
*	One of two five-wicket hauls by Marshall in a match
†	Marshall selected as "Man of the match"
‡	10 wickets or more taken in the match

== Tests ==
Five-wicket hauls in Test cricket by Malcolm Marshall
No.	Date	Ground	Against	Inn	Overs	Runs	Wkts	Econ	Batsmen	Result
1	11 March 1983	Queen's Park Oval, Port of Spain	India	1	19.1	37	5	1.93	Dilip Vengsarkar; Ravi Shastri; Kapil Dev; Balwinder Sandhu; Maninder Singh	Won
2	10 December 1983	Eden Gardens, Calcutta (Note: Calcutta has since been renamed as Kolkata.)	India	3	15	37	6	2.46	Dilip Vengsarkar; Shivlal Yadav; Ashok Malhotra; Ravi Shastri; Roger Binny; Kapil Dev	Won
3	24 December 1983	MA Chidambaram Stadium, Madras (Note: Madras has since been renamed as Chennai.)	India	2	26	72	5	2.76	Anshuman Gaekwad; Dilip Vengsarkar; Shivlal Yadav; Roger Binny; Kapil Dev	Drawn
4	30 March 1984†	Kensington Oval, Bridgetown	Australia	3	15.5	42	5	2.65	Steve Smith; Greg Ritchie; Wayne Phillips; Geoff Lawson; Terry Alderman	Won
5	28 April 1984	Sabina Park, Kingston	Australia	3	23	51	5	2.21	Kim Hughes; David Hookes; Tom Hogan; Geoff Lawson; Rodney Hogg	Won
6	28 June 1984	Lord's Cricket Ground, London	England	1	36.5	85	6	2.30	Chris Broad; David Gower; Allan Lamb; Mike Gatting; Neil Foster; Bob Willis	Won
7	12 July 1984	Headingley, Leeds	England	3	26	53	7	2.03	Graeme Fowler; Chris Broad; Allan Lamb; Paul Downton; Nick Cook; Derek Pringle; Paul Allott	Won
8	9 August 1984	The Oval, London	England	2	17.5	35	5	1.96	Pat Pocock; Allan Lamb; Ian Botham; Paul Allott; Jonathan Agnew	Won
9	23 November 1984	The Gabba, Brisbane	Australia	3	34	82	5	2.41	John Dyson; David Boon; Terry Alderman; Geof Lawson; Bob Holland	Won
10	7 December 1984*‡	Adelaide Oval, Adelaide	Australia	2	26	69	5	2.65	Kepler Wessels; Steve Rixon; Allan Border; David Boon; Terry Alderman	Won
11	7 December 1984*‡	Adelaide Oval, Adelaide	Australia	4	15.5	38	5	2.40	John Dyson; Allan Border; Kim Hughes; Geoff Lawson; Terry Alderman	Won
12	22 December 1984	Melbourne Cricket Ground, Melbourne	Australia	2	31.5	86	5	2.70	Kepler Wessels; Greg Matthews; Steve Rixon; Craig McDermott; Rodney Hogg	Drawn
13	26 April 1985†‡	Kensington Oval, Bridgetown	New Zealand	3	25.3	80	7	3.13	Geoff Howarth; Ken Rutherford; Martin Crowe; Jeremy Coney; Ian Smith; Derek Stirling; Stephen Boock	Won
14	7 November 1986†	Gaddafi Stadium, Lahore	Pakistan	1	18	33	5	1.83	Mohsin Khan; Rizwan-uz-Zaman; Qasim Umar; Asif Mujtaba; Wasim Akram	Won
15	22 April 1988†	Kensington Oval, Bridgetown	Pakistan	3	23	65	5	2.82	Rameez Raja; Javed Miandad; Aamer Malik; Wasim Akram; Abdul Qadir	Won
16	2 June 1988†	Trent Bridge, Nottingham	England	1	30	69	6	2.30	Graham Gooch; Chris Broad; Mike Gatting; Allan Lamb; Derek Pringle; John Emburey	Drawn
17	16 June 1988‡	Lord's Cricket Ground, London	England	2	18	32	6	1.77	Graham Gooch; Chris Broad; Allan Lamb; Paul Downton; Paul Jarvis; Graham Dilley	Won
18	30 June 1988†	Old Trafford, Manchester	England	3	15.4	22	7	1.40	Graham Gooch; Mike Gatting; David Gower; David Capel; Paul Downton; Graham Dilley; Phillip DeFreitas	Won
19	26 January 1989	Sydney Cricket Ground, Sydney	Australia	2	31	29	5	0.93	Geoff Marsh; Allan Border; Ian Healy; Peter Taylor; Trevor Hohns	Lost
20	7 April 1989	Kensington Oval, Bridgetown	India	3	26	60	5	2.30	Navjot Singh Sidhu; Mohammad Azharuddin; Kapil Dev; Kiran More; Arshad Ayub	Won
21	15 April 1989*†‡	Queen's Park Oval, Port of Spain	India	2	17	34	5	2.00	Arun Lal; Navjot Singh Sidhu; Ravi Shastri; Sanjay Manjrekar; Kapil Dev	Won
22	15 April 1989*†‡	Queen's Park Oval, Port of Spain	India	4	19.5	55	6	2.77	Arun Lal; Woorkeri Raman; Dilip Vengsarkar; Sanjay Manjrekar; Kiran More; Chetan Sharma	Won
