= Australian cricket team in Sri Lanka in 1982–83 =

International cricket tour

	Sri Lanka	Australia
- Dates: 22 April 1983 – 26 April 1983
Captains	Duleep Mendis	Greg Chappell

Test series
- Result: Australia won the 1-match series 1–0
Most runs	Arjuna Ranatunga (122)	David Hookes (143)
Most wickets	Ashantha de Mel (2)	Bruce Yardley (7)
- Player of the series: Kepler Wessels (Aus)

One Day International series
- Results: Sri Lanka won the 4-match series 2–0
Most runs	Sidath Wettimuny (93)	Graham Yallop (209)
Most wickets	Tom Hogan (4)	Ashantha de Mel (5)

The Australian cricket team had a short tour of Sri Lanka during the 1982–83 season. The two countries played their first ever Test together, which Australia won. Sri Lanka defeated Australia in the rain affected ODI series 2–0.

== Squad ==
The squad was announced in March 1983. Regular players Rod Marsh, Jeff Thomson, Geoff Lawson and Kim Hughes elected not to tour. Australia picked the following squad:

- Batsmen - Greg Chappell (captain), David Hookes (vice-captain), Graeme Wood, Kepler Wessels, Allan Border, Graham Yallop, Steve Smith
- Fast bowlers - Dennis Lillee, Rodney Hogg, John Maguire
- Spinners - Bruce Yardley, Tom Hogan
- Wicketkeeper - Roger Woolley
- Manager - Basil Rigg

Five of the players had not toured for Australia before: Smith, Maguire, Hogan, Wessels and Woolley. Woolley was chosen over two other Sheffield Shield wicketkeepers who had represented Australia in Test cricket, Kevin Wright and Steve Rixon. John Dyson, who had been an Australian regular over the home summer, was a surprise omission. Graham Yallop earned an international recall after a very strong domestic season. Tom Hogan was considered a surprise selection.

== Test series ==
=== Only Test ===
22 – 26 April
Scorecard

Australia	v	Sri Lanka
514/4d (131 overs); David Hookes 143* (152); Ashantha de Mel 2/113 (23 overs)		271 (72.5 overs); Arjuna Ranatunga 90 (120); Bruce Yardley 5/88 (19 overs)
		205 (65.2 overs) (f/o); Sidath Wettimuny 96 (145); Tom Hogan 5/66 (25.2 overs)

Australia won by an innings and 38 runs
Asgiriya Stadium, Kandy
Umpires: Basil Anthony (SL) and Herbi Felsinger (SL)
Player of the match: Kepler Wessels (Aus)

- Australia won the toss and elected to bat.
- This was the first Test match between two teams.
- Greg Chappell captained Australia for the 48th and final time.
- Roger Woolley (Aus), Tom Hogan (Aus) and Roshan Guneratne (SL) all made their debut.
- David Hookes scored his first (and only) Test match century.

== One Day Internationals (ODIs) ==
Sri Lanka won the series 2–0.

=== 1st ODI ===
13 April 1983
Scorecard

Australia; 168/9 (45 overs)	v	Sri Lanka; 169/8 (44.1 overs)
G. M. Wood 50 (71); D. S. de Silva 2/21 (9 overs)		S. Wettimuny 37 (79); T. G. Hogan 3/27 (9 overs)

Sri Lanka won by 2 wickets
Paikiasothy Saravanamuttu Stadium, Colombo
Umpires: C. E. B. Anthony and P. W. Vidanagamage
Player of the match: R. G. de Alwis (SL)

- Australia won the toss and elected to bat.
- R. D. Woolley (AUS) made his ODI debut.

=== 2nd ODI ===
16 April 1983
Scorecard

Australia; 207/5 (45 overs)	v	Sri Lanka; 213/6 (43.2 overs)
GN Yallop 59 (63); RJ Ratnayake 2/38 (9 overs)		S Wettimuny 56 (92); B Yardley 3/28 (9 overs)

Sri Lanka won by 4 wickets
Paikiasothy Saravanamuttu Stadium, Colombo
Umpires: DP Buultjens and HC Felsinger
Player of the match: A Ranatunga (SL)

- Sri Lanka won the toss and elected to field.

=== 3rd ODI ===
29 April 1983
Scorecard

Australia; 194/5 (39.2 overs)	v	Sri Lanka
GN Yallop 51 (55); DS de Silva 2/51 (9 overs)

No result
Sinhalese Sports Club Ground, Colombo
Umpires: KT Francis and PW Vidanagamage

- Sri Lanka won the toss and elected to field.

=== 4th ODI ===
30 April 1983
Scorecard

Australia; 124/3 (19.2 overs)	v	Sri Lanka
GN Yallop 60* (81); ALF de Mel 2/9 (4 overs)

No result
Sinhalese Sports Club Ground, Colombo
Umpires: DP Buultjens and S Ponnadurai

- Australia won the toss and elected to bat.
- The match was reduced before play started to 30 overs per side.
- GN de Silva and DSBP Kuruppu (SL) made their ODI debuts.

== Statistics ==
=== Most runs (Test) ===
Rank	Runs	Player	Teams	Innings	Average	High Score	100	50
1	143	David Hookes	(Australia)	1	-	143*	1	-
2	141	Kepler Wessels	(Australia)	1	141.00	141	1	-
3	122	Arjuna Ranatunga	(Sri Lanka)	2	61.00	90	0	1
4	98	Graham Yallop	(Australia)	1	98.00	98	0	1
5	96	Sidath Wettimuny	(Sri Lanka)	2	48.00	96	0	1
Last Updated: 24 February 2024

=== Most wickets (Test) ===
Rank	Wickets	Player	Teams	Innings	Best	Average	Economy	5w
1	7	Bruce Yardley	(Australia)	2	5/88	23.71	3.25	1
2	6	Tom Hogan	(Australia)	2	5/66	19.33	3.19	1
3	3	Dennis Lillee	(Australia)	2	2/67	35.66	3.56	0
4	2	Ashantha de Mel	(Sri Lanka)	1	2/113	56.50	4.91	0
5	1	Allan Border	(Australia)	1	1/11	11.00	2.27	0
Last Updated: 24 February 2024

=== Most runs (ODI) ===
Rank	Runs	Player	Teams	Innings	Average	High Score	100	50
1	209	Graham Yallop	(Australia)	4	69.66	60*	0	3
2	99	David Hookes	(Australia)	4	24.75	49	0	0
3	96	Graeme Wood	(Australia)	4	24.00	50	0	1
4	93	Sidath Wettimuny	(Sri Lanka)	2	46.50	56	-	1
5	83	Kepler Wessels	(Australia)	3	29.33	43	0	0
Last Updated: 24 February 2024

=== Most wickets (ODI) ===
Rank	Wickets	Player	Teams	Innings	Best	Average	Economy	4w
1	5	Ashantha de Mel	(Sri Lanka)	4	2/9	23.40	3.77	0
2	4	Tom Hogan	(Australia)	2	3/27	22.50	4.94	0
3	4	Vinothen John	(Sri Lanka)	4	2/33	26.00	3.54	0
4	4	Somachandra De Silva	(Sri Lanka)	3	2/21	31.00	4.59	0
5	4	Arjuna Ranatunga	(Sri Lanka)	4	2/26	37.00	4.93	0
Last Updated: 23 February 2024
