= Australian cricket team in England in 1985 =

International cricket tour

The Australian cricket team toured England in the 1985 season to play a six-match Test series against England. England won the series 3–1 with two matches drawn. England therefore regained The Ashes.

== Test series summary ==
=== First Test ===
13–18 June 1985
Scorecard

Australia	v	England
331 (98.1 overs); AMJ Hilditch 119 (183); IT Botham 3/86 (29.1 overs)		533 (125 overs); RT Robinson 175 (272); CJ McDermott 4/134 (32 overs)
324 (115.4 overs); WB Phillips 91 (171); JE Emburey 5/82 (43.4 overs)		123/5 (38.4 overs); AJ Lamb 31 (63); SP O'Donnell 3/37 (15.4 overs)

England won by 5 wickets
Headingley, Leeds
Umpires: BJ Meyer and KE Palmer
Player of the match: RT Robinson (Eng)

- Australia won the toss and elected to bat.
- 16 June was taken as a rest day.
- SP O'Donnell (Aus) made his Test debut.

=== Second Test ===
27 June - 2 July 1985
Scorecard

England	v	Australia
290 (99.2 overs); DI Gower 86 (146); CJ McDermott 6/70 (29.2 overs)		425 (124.4 overs); AR Border 196 (318); IT Botham 5/109 (24 overs)
261 (80 overs); IT Botham 85 (117); RG Holland 5/68 (32 overs)		127/6 (46 overs); AR Border 41* (89); IT Botham 2/49 (15 overs)

Australia won by 4 wickets
Lord's, London
Umpires: HD Bird and DGL Evans
Player of the match: AR Border (Aus)

- Australia won the toss and elected to field.
- 30 June was taken as a rest day.

=== Third Test ===
11–16 July 1985
Scorecard

England	v	Australia
456 (129.4 overs); DI Gower 166 (284); GF Lawson 5/103 (39.4 overs)		539 (201.2 overs); GM Wood 172 (449); IT Botham 3/107 (34.2 overs)
196/2 (68 overs); RT Robinson 77* (197); CJ McDermott 2/42 (16 overs)

Match drawn
Trent Bridge, Nottingham
Umpires: DJ Constant and AGT Whitehead
Player of the match: DI Gower (Eng)

- England won the toss and elected to bat.
- 14 July was taken as a rest day
- A Sidebottom (Eng) made his Test debut.

=== Fourth Test ===
1–6 August 1985
Scorecard

Australia	v	England
257 (89.1 overs); DC Boon 61 (146); PH Edmonds 4/40 (15.1 overs)		482/9d (141 overs); MW Gatting 160 (266); CJ McDermott 8/141 (36 overs)
340/5 (140 overs); AR Border 146* (334); JE Emburey 4/99 (51 overs)

Match drawn
Old Trafford, Manchester
Umpires: HD Bird and DR Shepherd
Player of the match: CJ McDermott (Aus)

- England won the toss and elected to field.
- 4 August was taken as a rest day

=== Fifth Test ===
15–20 August 1985
Scorecard

Australia	v	England
335 (113.5 overs); KC Wessels 83 (205); RM Ellison 6/77 (31.5 overs)		595/5d (134 overs); DI Gower 215 (314); GF Lawson 2/135 (37 overs)
142 (64.1 overs); WB Phillips 59 (90); RM Ellison 4/27 (9 overs)

England won by an innings and 118 runs
Edgbaston Cricket Ground, Birmingham
Umpires: DJ Constant and DR Shepherd
Player of the match: RM Ellison (Eng)

- England won the toss and elected to field.
- 18 August was taken as a rest day
- LB Taylor (Eng) made his Test debut.

=== Sixth Test ===
29 August – 2 September 1985
Scorecard

England	v	Australia
464 (118.2 overs); GA Gooch 196 (310); GF Lawson 4/101 (29.2 overs)		241 (84 overs); GM Ritchie 64* (156); IT Botham 3/64 (20 overs)
		129 (f/o) (46.3 overs); AR Border 58 (92); RM Ellison 5/46 (17 overs)

England won by an innings and 94 runs
Kennington Oval, Kennington
Umpires: HD Bird and KE Palmer
Player of the match: GA Gooch (Eng)

- England won the toss and elected to bat.
- 1 September was taken as a rest day
- DR Gilbert (Aus) made his Test debut.
- The England innings of 464 is the lowest innings in Test match history to feature a 350+ run partnership - Graham Gooch and David Gower added 351 runs for the 2nd wicket.

== One Day Internationals (ODIs) ==
Australia won the Texaco Trophy 2–1.

=== 1st ODI ===
30 May 1985
Scorecard

England; 219 (54 overs)	v	Australia; 220/7 (54.1 overs)
IT Botham 72 (82); GF Lawson 4/26 (10 overs)		AR Border 59 (76); NG Cowans 2/44 (10.1 overs)

Australia won by 3 wickets
Old Trafford, Manchester
Umpires: DGL Evans and KE Palmer
Player of the match: IT Botham (ENG)

- England won the toss and elected to bat.

=== 2nd ODI ===
1 June 1985
Scorecard

England; 231/7 (55 overs)	v	Australia; 233/6 (54 overs)
GA Gooch 115 (159); SP O'Donnell 2/32 (11 overs)		AR Border 85* (123); IT Botham 2/38 (10 overs)

Australia won by 4 wickets
Edgbaston, Birmingham
Umpires: DJ Constant and DR Shepherd
Player of the match: AR Border (AUS)

- Australia won the toss and elected to field.

=== 3rd ODI ===
3 June 1985
Scorecard

Australia; 254/5 (55 overs)	v	England; 257/2 (49 overs)
GM Wood 114* (165); IT Botham 1/27 (8 overs)		GA Gooch 117* (164); CJ McDermott 2/51 (10 overs)

England won by 8 wickets
Lord's, London
Umpires: HD Bird and BJ Meyer
Player of the match: DI Gower (ENG)

- England won the toss and elected to field.

== Australian squad ==
Australia had endured a turbulent summer during the 1984–85 season, which included the resignation of their captain Kim Hughes and consistent defeats at the hands of the West Indian cricket side. However, there were some encouraging signs, such as the consistent form of Kepler Wessels, the re-emergence of Andrew Hilditch as a test batsman, the discovery of an exciting new pace prospect in Craig McDermott and improved spin bowling stocks, led by Bob Holland.

=== Original squad ===
The original squad selected were as follows:

- Batsmen - Allan Border (captain), Andrew Hilditch (vice captain), David Boon, Greg Ritchie, Dirk Wellham, Kepler Wessels, Graeme Wood
- Fast bowlers - Terry Alderman, Geoff Lawson, Craig McDermott, Rod McCurdy
- Spinners - Murray Bennett, Bob Holland, Greg Matthews
- Wicketkeepers - Wayne Phillips, Steve Rixon
- All-rounders - Simon O'Donnell

=== "Rebel tours" of South Africa ===
However it was revealed prior to leaving for England that several of the cricketers had signed to play cricket in South Africa over the 1985–86 and 1986–87 seasons, including Alderman, Wellham, Wood, McCurdy, Phillips, Bennett and Rixon. Although these contracts did not start until after the Ashes, the Australian Cricket Board were reluctant to allow these players to go on the tour.

Wellham, Phillips and Wood were then all offered inducements by Kerry Packer, who owned TV rights to the game, not to go to South Africa, and Bennett changed his mind. Alderman, McCurdy and Rixon stuck by their original decisions, and were ruled ineligible to tour. They were replaced by Carl Rackemann, John Maguire and Ray Phillips. Rackemann and McGuire then revealed that they too had signed to tour South Africa, and were replaced by David Gilbert and Jeff Thomson.

The remaining Australian team originally elected to tour without Wellham, Phillips and Wood but eventually changed their mind after a team meeting.

== Series ==
Australia performed reasonably well in the early tour games, the highlight being Allan Border scoring four centuries in consecutive first class games. Jeff Thomson leapt into test consideration after taking eight wickets against Somerset. David Boon, Greg Ritchie and Wayne Phillips also scored well in early games, and Bob Holland took a number of wickets. Simon O'Donnell's century against the MCC saw him come into consideration as an all rounder.

Australia won the one day series 2–1. They then drew a game against Leicestershire in which David Gower scored a century, taking heavy toll off Bob Holland's bowling, while Jeff Thomson took five wickets.

This saw Thomson preferred over Holland in Australia's team for the first test. Simon O'Donnell was picked as the fourth bowler in support of McDermott, Lawson and Thomson, despite a noticeable lack of success with the ball on the tour until that date. The rest of the team consisted of Wood, Hilditch, Wessels, Border, Boon, Ritchie and Phillips. Australia lost the first by five wickets.

Holland then took five wickets in a game against Hampshire and came into the test side in place of Thomson for the second test. Australia won this by four wickets, due mostly to Allan Border's scores of 196 and 41 not out, and five wicket hauls to McDermott and Holland.

Australia kept the same side for the third test, which ended in a heavy scoring draw. In order to boost the bowling, the injured Graeme Wood was replaced by all rounder Greg Matthews in the fourth test, where Australia managed to escape with a draw due to a second innings century from Allan Border.

For the fifth test Wood returned and Matthews was dropped. However Australia decided to boost the bowling by dropping Boon for Jeff Thomson. Australia lost the game by an innings.

Australia dropped O'Donnell for the sixth and final test, bringing in Dirk Wellham instead, and replacing Holland with Murray Bennett and Jeff Thomson with Gilbert. Australia lost this game by an innings as well.

== External sources ==
- Australia in British Isles 1985
- Cricinfo Monthly article on the tour
- Guardian article on the tour

== Annual reviews ==
- Playfair Cricket Annual 1986
- Wisden Cricketers' Almanack 1986
