= Australian cricket team in India in 1984–85 =

International cricket tour

The Australian cricket team toured India in the 1984–85 season to play a five-match one day international series against India. The series was to help celebrate the Golden Jubilee of the Ranji Trophy.

Australia won the series 3–0 with two matches abandoned for rain. It was Australia's first ever victory in a one-day series on the subcontinent, and especially notable considering India had just won the 1983 Cricket World Cup. It was the only time Kim Hughes captained Australia to a series victory overseas.

== Australian squad ==
Australia had just lost a test series against the West Indies 3–0. The tour was relatively last minute with the Indian Cricket Board not requesting a team until June 1984.

The original squad was selected by a brand-new selection panel, Lawrie Sawle, Greg Chappell and Rick McCosker. It was as follows:

- Batsmen – Kim Hughes (captain), Allan Border (vice captain), Kepler Wessels, Graeme Wood, Steve Smith, Graham Yallop, Greg Ritchie
- Fastbowlers – Geoff Lawson, Carl Rackemann, John Maguire, Rodney Hogg
- Spinners – Tom Hogan, Murray Bennett
- Wicketkeepers – Wayne B. Phillips
- Manager – Bob Merriman

Australia's selectors would be Hughes, Border and Rodney Hogg.

Surprise omissions from the tour were David Hookes and Greg Matthews. They were also excluded from a 16-person list of cricketers to be offered playing contracts by the ACB.

== ODI series ==
Sunil Gavaskar was reinstated as captain of India following a series of defeats under Kapil Dev.

=== 1st ODI ===
28 September 1984 (D/N)
Scorecard

Australia; 220/9 (48 overs)	v	India; 172 (40.5 overs)
Kepler Wessels 107 (133); Madan Lal 2/23 (7 overs)		Kapil Dev 39 (47); Carl Rackemann 4/41 (10 overs)

Australia won by 48 runs
Jawaharlal Nehru Stadium (Delhi), New Delhi
Umpires: Bhairab Ganguli (Ind) and Piloo Reporter (Ind)
Player of the match: Kepler Wessels

- Australia won the toss and chose to bat
- Ashok Patel made his ODI debut for India

=== 2nd ODI ===
1 October 1984
Scorecard

India; 175 (37 overs)	v	Australia; 29/1 (7.4 overs)
Dilip Vengsarkar 77 (79); Tom Hogan 4/33 (8 overs)		Kepler Wessels 12 (18); Kapil Dev 1/14 (4 overs)

No result
University Stadium, Thiruvananthapuram
Umpires: Swaroop Kishen (Ind) and V. K. Ramaswamy (Ind)

- Australia won the toss and chose to field.

=== 3rd ODI ===
3 October 1984
Scorecard

India; 21/2 (5.1 overs)	v	Australia
Ghulam Parkar 12 (18); Carl Rackemann 2/3 (2.1 overs)

No result
Keenan Stadium, Jamshedpur
Umpires: Swaroop Kishen (Ind) and V. K. Ramaswamy (Ind)

- Australia won the toss and chose to field.
- Play started three hours late because the truck carrying the player's kit had gone missing

=== 4th ODI ===
5 October 1984
Scorecard

India; 206/6 (46 overs)	v	Australia; 210/3 (40.3 overs)
Roger Binny 57 (88); Geoff Lawson 3/25 (10 overs)		Allan Border 62* (90); Chetan Sharma 1/21 (7 overs)

Australia won by 7 wickets
Sardar Patel Stadium, Motera, Ahmedabad
Umpires: V. Vikramraju (Ind) and Dara Dotiwalla (Ind)
Player of the match: Geoff Lawson

- Australia won the toss and chose to field.
- Australia won prize money of 25,000 rupees, most of which they donated to a home for crippled children in Ahmedabad.

=== 5th ODI ===
6 October 1984
Scorecard

India; 235/5 (44 overs)	v	Australia; 236/4 (40.1 overs)
Ravi Shastri 102 (141); John Maguire 3/61 (10 overs)		Greg Ritchie 59* (64); Ashok Patel 3/43 (10 overs)

Australia won by 6 wickets
Nehru Stadium, Indore
Umpires: Sukha Bose (Ind) and Padmakar Pandit (Ind)
Player of the match: Ravi Shastri

- Australia won the toss and chose to field.

== Tour Game ==
=== Tour Match: Mumbai vs. Australia ===
8 October 1984
Scorecard

Mumbai; 190/6 (47 overs)	v	Australia; 191/5 (39.4 overs)
Lalchand Rajput 66; Allan Border 3/33 (8 overs)		Steve Smith 81 (retired ill); Ravi Shastri 3/40 (10 overs)

Australia won by 5 wickets
Wankhede Stadium, Mumbai
Umpires: Sukha Bose (Ind) and Rajan Mehta (Ind)

- Australia won the toss and chose to field.
- Mumbai played this match as Ranji Trophy holders and Australian captain Kim Hughes was presented with a replica of the Ranji Trophy

Mike Coward, who covered the tour, wrote that the series victory "was a triumph for [Kim] Hughes who meticulously planned each of the matches and ensured that this young team played the limited-over game at a more sophisticated level." Rodney Hogg returned early due to bronchitis.

== South African Rebel Tours ==
On the way back from the tour, several Australian players met up with representatives of the South African Cricket Board in Singapore. This led to the South African rebel tours.
