= Roy Pienaar =

South African cricketer

Personal information
- Full name: Roy Francois Pienaar
- Born: 17 July 1961 (age 65); Johannesburg, Transvaal
- Batting: Right-handed
- Bowling: Right-arm offbreak; Right-arm medium
- Role: All-rounder

Domestic team information
- Years: Team
- 1979/80–1980/81: Transvaal
- 1981/82–1985/86: Western Province
- 1985/86–1987/88: Northern Transvaal
- 1987–1989: Kent
- 1988/89–1992/93: Transvaal
- 1993/94–1999/00: Northern Transvaal/Northerns
- FC debut: 11 November 1977 Transvaal B v Rhodesia B
- Last FC: 6 November 1998 Northerns v Border
- LA debut: 20 October 1980 Transvaal B v Zimbabwe-Rhodesia
- Last LA: 23 December 1999 Northerns v Easterns

Career statistics
Competition	First-class	List A
Matches	199	233
Runs scored	10,896	6,705
Batting average	34.15	32.86
100s/50s	18/62	7/47
Top score	153	135
Balls bowled	10,388	3,406
Wickets	153	84
Bowling average	33.19	30.66
5 wickets in innings	3	0
10 wickets in match	0	0
Best bowling	5/24	4/34
Catches/stumpings	81/–	37/–
- Source: Cricinfo, 14 December 2019

Roy Francois Pienaar (born 17 July 1961) is a South African former first-class cricketer. He played for Transvaal, Western Province and Northern Transvaal/Northerns in domestic cricket and spent the period between 1987 and 1989 in England playing for Kent County Cricket Club. In both 1983 and 1990 he won the South African Cricket Annual Cricketer of the Year award.

== Early life and career ==
Pienaar was born at Johannesburg in 1961 and educated at St Stithians College. He was a promising youth cricketer and by the age of 14 was playing club cricket in the Transvaal Premier League. By 16 he had broken in to the Transvaal B team and in late 1979, at age 18, was playing for the Transvaal A team which dominated the Currie Cup during the late 1970s and early 1980s. (Note: After the end of white-minority rule in South Africa, Transvaal became the Gauteng cricket team.)

After moving to play for Western Province in 1981–82, Pienaar captained the South African Universities side for a number of seasons, including against the rebel Australian XI which toured South Africa in 1985–86. He moved to play for Northern Transvaal (Note: Northern Transvaal have been known as Northerns since 1997.) ahead of the 1985–86 season and also captained the South African Defence Force cricket team (Note: During this period, white South Africans were required to serve in the South African Defence Force by the apartheid era South African government.) and South African Cricket Board's Presidents XI during this period, the later team against another rebel Australian touring side in 1986–87. He played in four unofficial One Day International matches for the South Africa representative XI against the Australian XI in February 1987. (Note: These matches are not considered as One Day Internationals by the International Cricket Council as the Australian side was touring South Africa without the backing of the Australian Cricket Board.) He was the South African Cricket Annual Cricketer of the Year in 1983.

== Playing in England ==
Later in 1987 Pienaar first played in England for Kent County Cricket Club. He was drafted in as a replacement for injured overseas player Eldine Baptiste, initially as a temporary replacement. Pienaar eventually played three summers at Kent, making a favourable impression, both scoring runs and taking "important wickets" during the sides second-placed 1988 County Championship campaign. Knee injuries, however, limited his bowling in 1989, and Pienaar was forced to cancel his Kent contract. He had previously played league cricket for Pudsey St Lawrence in 1980.

Following knee surgery, Pienaar bowled very infrequently for the rest of his career. He had first suffered from issues with his knees at the age of 10 and these were exacerbated by the bowling workload he took on at Kent. (Note: The player Pienaar replaced at Kent, Eldine Baptiste, was primarily a bowler. Pienaar was more of a batting all-rounder.) He played in the only unofficial Test match played against the rebel England side which toured South Africa in 1989–90 (Note: A second unofficial Test match was cancelled due to protests against the South African apartheid regime, and four unofficial One Day International matches played to replace it.)

== Later career ==
Pienaar had moved back to Transvaal in 1988–89 and later moved again to play for Northern Transvaal from 1993–94 until his retirement. He played his last senior cricket in December 1999. He captained both sides on occasion and was again the South African Cricket Annual Cricketer of the Year in 1990. As a batsman Pienaar was considered "gifted" and used the square cut effectively.

During the early-1990s, Pienaar established a business making biltong. The company was sold during the 2000s, allowing Pienaar to retire in his 40s and focus on his family.

== Bibliography ==
- Ellis, Clive; Pennell, Mark (2010). Trophies and Tribulations: Forty Years of Kent Cricket. London: Greenwich Publishing. ISBN 978-09-56408-10-5.
- Moss, Stephen (2006). Wisden Anthology 1978–2006: Cricket's Age of Revolution. London: Bloomsbury. ISBN 978-19-05625-00-0.
