= Pienaar Anker =

South African cricketer

Personal information
- Born: 4 January 1956 (age 70); Bellville, Cape Town, South Africa
- Batting: Right-handed
- Bowling: Right-arm off-spin

Domestic team information
- Years: Team
- 1981–82 to 1990–91: Boland

Career statistics
Competition	First-class	List A
Matches	42	23
Runs scored	562	109
Batting average	17.03	9.90
100s/50s	0/3	0/0
Top score	59	26
Balls bowled	10,188	1230
Wickets	175	13
Bowling average	21.90	49.84
5 wickets in innings	9	0
10 wickets in match	2	n/a
Best bowling	6/50	2/26
Catches/stumpings	27/–	3/–
- Source: Cricinfo, 31 May 2020

Pienaar Anker (born 4 January 1956) is a South African cricketer who played first-class and List A cricket for Boland from 1981 to 1990.

An off-spin bowler and useful lower-order batsman, Anker took 50 wickets at an average of 14.62 when Boland, captained by Eddie Barlow, won the SAB Bowl for the first time in 1981–82. No other bowler in the competition took more than 31 wickets. He took 3 for 40 and 5 for 73 when Boland beat Western Province B in the final.

Anker's best career bowling figures were 6 for 50 in the second innings of Boland's victory over Transvaal B in 1983–84. His best match figures were 10 for 82 in the victory over Natal B in 1985–86. He played in two South African combined teams against the Australian team in 1986–87 and was reasonably successful, but was not selected for higher honours, and he never competed in the top echelon of the South African domestic competition.
