= Kevin McKenzie =

Kevin McKenzie may refer to:

- Kevin McKenzie (cricketer) (1948–2026), South African right-hand batsman
- Kevin McKenzie (dancer) (born 1954), American ballet performer, choreographer and artistic director
- Kevin McKenzie (rugby union) (born 1968), Scottish international rugby union player
- Kevin McKenzie (American football) (born 1975), American football player

== See also ==
- Kelvin MacKenzie (born 1946), editor/media figure, United Kingdom
- Mackenzie (surname)
