= Steve Smith (cricketer, born 1961) =

Australian cricketer

Personal information
- Full name: Steven Barry Smith
- Born: 18 October 1961 (age 65); Sydney, New South Wales, Australia
- Batting: Right-handed
- Role: Batsman

International information
- National side: Australia
- Test debut (cap 323): 2 March 1984 v West Indies
- Last Test: 28 April 1984 v West Indies
- ODI debut (cap 75): 6 February 1983 v New Zealand
- Last ODI: 10 February 1985 v West Indies

Domestic team information
- Years: Team
- 1981/82–1988/89: New South Wales
- 1989/90–1990/91: Transvaal

Career statistics
Competition	Test	ODI	FC	LA
Matches	3	28	90	89
Runs scored	41	861	5,248	2,816
Batting average	8.19	39.13	35.94	38.57
100s/50s	0/0	2/8	12/26	3/25
Top score	12	117	263	117
Balls bowled	–	7	115	277
Wickets	–	0	1	7
Bowling average	–	–	77.00	29.28
5 wickets in innings	–	–	0	0
10 wickets in match	–	–	0	0
Best bowling	–	–	1/35	2/16
Catches/stumpings	1/–	8/–	66/–	20/–
- Source: ESPNcricinfo, 12 December 2005

Steven Barry Smith (born 18 October 1961) is a former Australian and New South Wales cricketer. He played in three Test matches and 28 One Day Internationals between 1983 and 1985, taking part in tours of Sri Lanka, the West Indies, and India.

He joined the Australian rebel tours to South Africa in 1985–86 and 1986–87. He made 1163 runs at 52.86 and was named one of South Africa's Cricketers of the Year.

== Career ==
Steve Smith made his first grade debut for Bankstown when he was 17. His mother's cousin was test batsman Norm O'Neill, but he claimed a greater influence on his game was his father, who was a grade cricketer. He says a crucial stage in his development as a batsman came when he was 20 and moved to opener.

Scores of 162 and 215 not out at the beginning of the 1981–82 season saw him make his first class debut for New South Wales that summer. He was picked as 12th man for NSW against the touring West Indies then was selected to play in the team against Victoria. He made 35 in his first innings, taking part in a 77 run partnership with Rick McCosker. Smith ended up getting 245 first class runs at an average of 40. Smith played two McDonald's Cup games for NSW that summer, scoring 3 and 0 (in the final). He batted down the order in these games.

Smith's good form continued the 1982–83 season. He was promoted to opener against Queensland and scored his maiden Shield century. He then made 263 against Victoria, including 117 in a session. These efforts saw him selected in Australia's ODI team, with Smith and Graeme Wood replacing John Dyson and Kepler Wessels.

=== ODI Player ===
Smith made 28 in his first ODI, and 10 in his second, but then scored 117 off 130 balls in only his third game, against New Zealand. Captain Kim Hughes said "Smithy is a young, exciting player. He kept the ball on the ground and ran well. It shows that you need good running between the wickets early on."

For New South Wales, Smith played in the team that won the 1982–83 Shield final. He also scored a match winning 59 against Queensland in a McDonald's Cup game, helping his team recover from 6–104 to a 8–206 and a two wicket victory (he batted down the order as Rick McCosker wanted to open with John Dyson). He also He

These efforts led to him being picked in the Australian squad to tour Sri Lanka in 1983. He played two ODIs, scoring 1 and 0, and 21 and 33 in a touring game. Smith was overlooked for selection in Australia's 1983 World Cup squad in favour of Wood and Wessels.

In October 1983 Bob Simpson called Smith "the best young batsman to emerge in NSW for 20 years" and "the next Doug Walters", a claim which Ian Chappell called "ludicrous", urging Smith to be himself.

Smith scored consistently throughout the 1983–84 domestic season, making 480 first class runs at an average of 43.63. He established himself as an excellent one day international batsman, scoring 106 against Pakistan, which won him the Man of the Match Award. "It was concentration all the way, no one was easy, I just had to stay with it," Smith said. "Kim Hughes said if you get to 30 or 40, you will get your ton and 1 wanted to prove him right."

Smith also made two half centuries against the West Indies – scores of 55 and 50. He was injured during the next ODI while diving to stop a run, and did not bat.

=== Test career ===
In January 1984, Smith was picked to tour the West Indies. There was some doubt he would be able to go after dislocating his shoulder during the one day finals – Smith missed the 3rd ODI final and David Boon was put on standby to replace him – but Smith recovered in time.

Smith started the tour of the West Indies brilliantly, scoring a century in each innings in his first match, a draw against Guyana – the first time that feat had been accomplished in that country in ten years. (He was dropped three times for his first century, on 15, 40 and 62, and six times in his second) He won the man of the match award.

Smith followed this up with 60 in the 1st one day international, the highest Australian innings.

Smith's good form with the bat, along with Roger Woolley's poor work behind the stumps in tour games, prompted the selectors to pick Smith as opener to partner Kepler Wessels and move Wayne B. Phillips down the order and play him as wicketkeeper. Smith's first test was not a memorable one for him – he scored 3 and 12, and was dismissed twice by Joel Garner.

However he followed this with a useful knock of 27 in the second ODI, batting at number three, which helped set up an Australian victory. Smith was meant to play in the second test, but fell ill with a stomach virus and was replaced at the last minute by Dean Jones.

Smith recovered in time for the next tour game, against Barbados, where he hit 66 in the second innings. He was picked in the 3rd test but failed twice again, with scores of 10 and 7, getting out both times to Malcolm Marshall.

Smith was dropped for the 4th test, a decision considered a surprise as he and Wayne Phillips were by then the only specialist openers left in the squad (Graeme Wood and Wessels had been injured.)

Smith hit a vein of form, scoring 127 against the Windward Islands. After 6 in the 3rd ODi he made 84 against Jamaica, and 50 in the 4th ODI.

Smith was recalled to the test team for the final test. He made 9 in the first innings and was injured (a broken finger) so unable to bat in the second. Journalist Peter McFarline, summarising the tour, said Smith "should benefit greatly from the experience of the trip" despite "severe difficulties outside the off stump... He was a willing worker and the film's best outfielder. At this stage a definite candidate for Country Cups but should graduate to the top class in time."

In July 1984 Smith was selected on in the Australian squad to tour India in 1984. During the series he scored a half century and impressed Sunil Gavaskar with the quality of his fielding.

Smith started the 1984–85 domestic summer well, scoring 73 in a McDonald's Cup game against WA. He was unable to work his way back into the test team, failing to score a first class century all summer. However he played several one day games for Australia over the 1984–85 season, making three half centuries, and was only let go from the team due to injury. Highlights include an innings of 73 off 73 balls against Sri Lanka. He also scored 73 for NSW in a game against Wellington.

Smith's last ODI for Australia saw him score 54 against the West Indies. He injured his hand fielding. He was replaced in the Australian squad by Kim Hughes. Smith's injury meant he missed the World Championship of Cricket but he recovered to play in the 1984–85 Sheffield Shield final. Smith made a key contribution, scoring 76. However Smith was overlooked for the 1985 Ashes.

== South Africa ==
Smith had been approached by Graham Yallop during the India tour to see if he was interested in touring South Africa with an unofficial Australian XI. After he missed selection in the Australian teams to tour Sharjah or England in early 1985, Smith asked to be considered for the team going to South Africa. He signed to play for two seasons, 1985–86 and 1986–87.

When the news of the tour broke, tour organiser Bruce Francis claims Smith was one of several players Kerry Packer wanted to buy back into official Australian cricket, along with Dirk Wellham, Wayne B. Phillips and Graeme Wood. Packer succeeded in persuading those three not to go to South Africa, but not Smith. Francis said he thought Smith wanted to go on the tour partly for the money – $200,000 after tax – but also because it gave him the chance to show he was not a one-day specialist.

During the first South African tour Smith only played one "test", due to injury, but made the most of it, scoring a century in the first innings. He also made two half centuries in the one day internationals.

During the second tour, Smith scored centuries in the 3rd and 4th unofficial test matches. He scored more first class runs on that trip than any other Australian batsman.

=== Return to Australia ===
Smith resumed his career in Australia. In December 1987 he and fellow tourist Steve Rixon were called to the New South Wales team. "I definitely took my cricket career into my own hands by going to South Africa," said Smith. "Still I believe I have quite a few years of cricket left in me and it is nice to be back in the side."

Smith was unable to recapture his previous form, with a highest first class score of 84 over two summers. He moved to South Africa and played for Transvaal for two seasons, which meant he was banned from first class cricket in Australia for ten years.

Smith's ban was lifted in August 1991 when South Africa was readmitted to work cricket. He tried to get back in the New South Wales team but was unsuccessful and in October 1992 declared himself unavailable for state selection, citing work and family commitments.

== Post-playing career ==
Smith ran an indoor cricket centre, became a batting coach for Bankstown as well as a New South Wales selector.

== Bibliography ==
- Francis, Bruce (1989). Guilty? Bob Hawke or Kim Hughes?. B. Francis. ISBN 9780731653881.
