= Roshan Guneratne =

Sri Lankan cricketer (1962–2005)

Personal information
- Full name: Roshan Punyajith Wijesinghe Guneratne
- Born: 26 January 1962; Colombo, Sri Lanka
- Died: 21 July 2005 (aged 43); California, United States
- Batting: Right-handed
- Bowling: Legbreak

International information
- National side: Sri Lanka
- Only Test (cap 24): 22 April 1983 v Australia

Career statistics
Competition	Test	First-class
Matches	1	13
Runs scored	–	95
Batting average	–	8.63
100s/50s	–	0/0
Top score	–	29
Balls bowled	102	1,056
Wickets	0	17
Bowling average	–	35.23
5 wickets in innings	–	0
10 wickets in match	–	0
Best bowling	–	4/34
Catches/stumpings	0/–	10/–
- Source: Cricinfo, 18 August 2019

Roshan Punyajith Wijesinghe Guneratne (26 January 1962 – 21 July 2005) was a Sri Lankan cricketer who played in one Test match in 1983.

Guneratne was born at Colombo in 1962. He was educated at Nalanda College Colombo and captained the college's cricket team in 1982. He was the 24th Sri Lankan Test cap, playing against (Australia at Kandy in 1983).

He died suddenly of a heart attack at the age of 43 in California.

== See also ==
- One-Test wonder
