= Michael Taylor (Australian cricketer) =

Australian first class cricketer (born 1955)

Mick Taylor
Personal information
- Full name: Michael David Taylor
- Born: 9 June 1955 (age 71); Chelsea, Victoria, Australia
- Batting: Right-handed

Domestic team information
- Years: Team
- 1987/88–1988/89: Tasmania
- 1977/78–1984/85: Victoria

Career statistics
Competition	FC	LA
Matches	75	32
Runs scored	5,005	644
Batting average	46.34	25.76
100s/50s	13/25	–/2
Top score	234*	64*
Balls bowled	59	–
Wickets	–	–
Bowling average	–	–
5 wickets in innings	–	–
10 wickets in match	–	–
Best bowling	–	–
Catches/stumpings	40/–	11/–
- Source: Cricinfo, 2 January 2011

Michael David Taylor (born 9 June 1955) is an Australian retired first class cricketer who played for Victoria and Tasmania, and despite never playing Test cricket or One Day Internationals for Australia, also participated in the South African rebel tours. Highlights of his career included 1000 first class runs in a season while playing with both Victoria and Tasmania and an unbeaten 234 for Victoria against the touring West Indians in Melbourne in 1984–85.

== Career ==
Michael Taylor was a right-handed batsman who debuted for the South Melbourne Club in 1972–73. He made his first class debut in the 1977–78 season, making 75 and 107 against Queensland in his first game, but his subsequent form was inconsistent and he only played 5 more matches over the next two seasons.

Taylor's club form remained strong and he won the Ryder Medal in 1981–82 for the best player in the VCA games. He established himself in the Victorian side in the 1982–83 season, making 771 runs at an average of 45.35. The following season he scored 1010 runs at 72.14, including a century against the visiting Pakistanis.

In 1984–85 he scored 801 runs at 50.06, the highlight being 234 not out against the West Indies, an innings that went for eight and a half hours. He was also selected to play for the Prime Ministers XI.

=== South African Rebel Tours ===
Taylor decided to join the South African rebel tours for the 1985–86 and 86–87 seasons. He said at the time:

It was easy to agree to go there because I have never played Test cricket for Australia. Because of my age [30 next month], chances were getting limited. It was easier for me than for some of the younger guys, Carl Rackemann for instance. Rackemann could have potentially had five to eight years in which to play Tests. I looked into the South African situation a fair bit before I decided to go. It's a very complex problem which certainly can't be fixed overnight. I have never toured and played against an international team, so I viewed this as my chance; a chance to tour and play against probably one of the best cricketing nations in the world. Though I have never played a Test for Australia, I thought at one stage I might have been fairly close to it. I was hopeful of getting a game at one stage last season. When I look back at my career I will not have any regrets.

On the first tour he was Australia's best batsman with 668 runs at an average of 55.66 an innings. In the first unofficial test at Durban he scored 109 against the South African XI. He returned to South Africa for the second rebel tour of 1986–87, but it was less fruitful for Taylor. He managed 306 runs at 27.81 with a top score of 64.

=== Return to Australia ===
The South African rebels were banned from first class cricket in Australia for two seasons, being available for selection in 1987–88. However the Victorian players in particular found it difficult re-integrating into their old team. Graham Yallop says they were "shunned by the Victorian Cricket Association... That's why Mick Taylor went to Tassie, Rod McCurdy stayed in South Africa, and Rodney Hogg and myself [eventually] went back to club cricket. But we knew the VCA wouldn't pick us. It was disappointing, we could've given a lot to the game at that stage; we weren't that old. But we were certainly shunned by the association."

Taylor signed with Tasmania for the 1987–88 summer. He scored 1003 runs, including 216 against South Australia in Adelaide and 85 against New Zealand.

In 1988–89 Taylor failed to get beyond 32 in seven innings and dropped out of senior cricket.

=== Later career ===
Taylor won a hat-trick of premierships with North Hobart in 1991/92, 1992/93 and 1993/94, before resuming with South Melbourne in 1994/95.

== Australian rules football career ==
Taylor was also a successful Australian rules footballer, playing 51 games for Victorian Football Association (VFA) club Caulfield from 1975 to 1980.

== See also ==
- List of Victoria first-class cricketers
- List of Tasmanian representative cricketers

== Sources ==
- Piesse, K. (2010) The Bears Uncensored, Cricketbooks.com.au: Melbourne. ISBN 9780646528793
