= John Maguire (cricketer) =

Australian cricketer

Cricket information
- Batting: Right-handed
- Bowling: Right-arm fast-medium

International information
- National side: Australia
- Test debut (cap 321): 26 December 1983 v Pakistan
- Last Test: 28 April 1984 v West Indies
- ODI debut (cap 72): 23 January 1983 v England
- Last ODI: 5 October 1984 v India

Career statistics
Competition	Test	ODI
Matches	3	23
Runs scored	28	42
Batting average	7.00	7.00
100s/50s	0/0	0/0
Top score	15*	14*
Balls bowled	616	1,009
Wickets	10	19
Bowling average	32.29	40.47
5 wickets in innings	0	0
10 wickets in match	0	0
Best bowling	4/57	3/61
Catches/stumpings	2/–	2/–
- Source: Cricinfo, 12 December 2005

John Norman Maguire (born 15 September 1956) is a former Australian cricketer who played in three Test matches and 23 One Day Internationals in 1983 and 1984.

== Career ==
A right-arm fast-medium bowler, Maguire debuted for Wynnum Manly in Queensland at 20 years and 74 days after being discovered playing Warehouse cricket. For Wynnum he played over eight seasons from 1977 to 1984, taking 96 wickets at 19.18.

Maguire made his first-class cricket debut for Queensland in 1977–78 but did not hold down a regular place until 1981–82. He played his first one-day international in 1982–83, earning fame because he was called up during a Sheffield Shield game and had to be replaced by Michael Maranta.

Maguire toured Sri Lanka in 1983 without playing a Test although he played some one day games.

=== Tests ===
Maguire made his Test debut against Pakistan in December 1983, replacing an injured Rodney Hogg.

He was picked in the squad to tour the West Indies in 1984 and played in the last two tests.

He also went on the one day tour to India in 1984.

=== South African tours and Australian ban ===
Maguire was unable to break into the Test side over the 1984–85 summer. He was close to being selected in the squad to tour England in 1985. When Terry Alderman and Rod McCurdy revealed they had signed to play in South Africa over the 1985–86 and 86-87 summers, they were replaced by Carl Rackemann and Maguire. However it was then revealed they had both signed as well and were unable to tour, being finally replaced by Jeff Thomson and Dave Gilbert.

Like the other rebel tourists, Maguire was banned from first class cricket in Australia for two years and from representative cricket for three years. He played in South Africa during that time.

=== Later career ===
Towards the end of his career he played two seasons in South Africa for Eastern Province and one for English county side Leicestershire, winning South African Cricketer of the Year in 1990.

His return to South Africa meant he was banned for an additional ten years, but this was lifted when South Africa was re-admitted to world cricket.
