= Mike Haysman =

South African cricket commentator

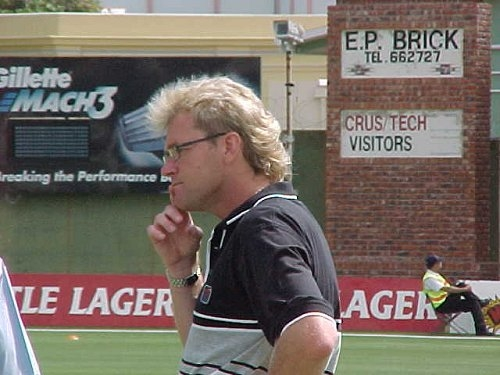

Personal information
- Full name: Michael Donald Haysman
- Born: 22 April 1961 (age 65); Adelaide, South Australia, Australia
- Batting: Right-handed
- Bowling: Right-arm Off Break
- Role: Commentator

Domestic team information
- Years: Team
- 1982/83: South Australia
- 1983/84: Leicestershire
- 1985/86: Australian XI
- 1987/88: South Australia
- 1988/89: Northern Transvaal
- First-class debut: 1982 South Australia v Victoria

Career statistics
Competition	FC	LA
Matches	103	81
Runs scored	5977	1947
Batting average	36.89	29.95
100s/50s	13/24	2/13
Top score	180	103*
Balls bowled	1244	233
Wickets	5	5
Bowling average	135.20	35.00
5 wickets in innings	0	0
10 wickets in match	0	n/a
Best bowling	2/19	1/7
Catches/stumpings	140/–	36/–
- Source: Cricinfo, 6 November 2009

Michael Donald Haysman (born 22 April 1961) is an Australian born international cricket commentator. Prior to his broadcasting career, he is perhaps best known as a participant in the South African rebel tours.

Haysman was born in Adelaide, South Australia.

As a first class cricketer, he represented Leicestershire, Northern Transvaal, South Australia and Transvaal domestic sides.

From 1985 to 1987, Haysman represented the Australian XI in the South African rebel tours.

Haysman worked for SuperSport for over ten years, hosting cricket show Extra Cover and making regular appearances on Super Saturday. On 28 October 2006 he recorded his last SuperSport appearance. He lived in Miami for nearly three years working with Allen Stanford's Twenty20 competition as commentator and analyst but moved to Santa Monica, California after Stanford's conviction on fraud charges. Haysman now resides in Los Angeles and travels when and where his services are required to host and commentate. Nowadays he is working primarily for SuperSport, ESPN International and Ten Sports.

== Career ==
In 1978–79 Haysman represented the Australian Under 19 team.

In 1981–82 he scored 264 for the South Australian U 23 side against WA.

In 1982 he scored more than 1,400 runs at an average of 70 for Leicestershire

Haysman made his Sheffield Shield debut in November 1982. He scored 126 against Queensland making him the first player to score a century in his Shield debut in more than ten years. That summer he made 684 first class runs at 57.

In November 1983 he scored 92 in a McDonalds Cup match, winning him the man of the match award.

In January 1985 he scored a matchwinning century against WA in a McDonalds Cup match. Later that month he scored 172 in a Shield game.

Haysman was overlooked for the Australian U 25 side to tour Zimbabwe.

=== South Africa ===
In August 1985 Haysman signed to tour South Africa. He called it "the toughest decision I've ever had to make. But I'm a professional cricketer and I'm just pursuing my profession. Because I'm going to be playing with and against international players, I see the tour as a great chance for me to improve my own game and put that to good use when I get back to help South Australia."

Haysman struggled on the first tour making 326 first class runs at 29.63 but did well on the second, making 738 runs at 61.5.

He played in Australia in 1987/88 only making 287 first class runs at 26.09.

He moved back to South Africa and played there from 1988–89 to 1993–94.

== See also ==
- List of cricket commentators
