= Corrie van Zyl =

South African cricketer (born 1961)

Personal information
- Full name: Cornelius Johannes Petrus Gerthardus van Zyl
- Born: 1 October 1961 (age 65); Bloemfontein, Free State Province, South Africa
- Batting: Right-handed
- Bowling: Right-arm fast-medium
- Role: Bowler

International information
- National side: South Africa
- ODI debut (cap 21): 7 April 1992 v West Indies
- Last ODI: 12 April 1992 v West Indies

Head coaching information
- Years: Team
- 2010–2011: South Africa

Career statistics
Competition	ODI	FC	LA
Matches	2	104	118
Runs scored	3	2,312	887
Batting average	3.00	18.06	15.83
100s/50s	0/0	1/10	0/1
Top score	3*	119	59*
Balls bowled	108	19,282	6,047
Wickets	0	349	127
Bowling average	–	23.38	27.81
5 wickets in innings	–	12	1
10 wickets in match	–	2	0
Best bowling	–	8/84	5/19
Catches/stumpings	0/–	41/–	28/–
- Source: Cricinfo, 21 December 2013

Cornelius Johannes Petrus Gerthardus van Zyl (born 1 October 1961) is a former South African cricketer who played two One Day Internationals in 1992. As of 2018 he was employed by Cricket South Africa as general manager of cricket.

Van Zyl previously coached the Gestetner Diamond Eagles and in 2010 he was appointed coach of the South Africa National cricket team, following the resignation of Mickey Arthur. He held the post until the end of the 2011 World Cup.

In October 2019, van Zyl was suspended from his position as interim director of Cricket South Africa along with the chief operating officer Naasei Appiah, and commercial manager Clive Eksteen for alleged negligence of duty over the non-payment of commercial rights fees during 2018's Mzansi Super League.
