= Anton Ferreira =

South African cricketer (born 1955)

Personal information
- Born: 13 April 1955 (age 71); Pretoria
- Batting: Right-handed
- Bowling: Right-arm medium

Career statistics
Competition	First-class	List A
Matches	245	230
Runs scored	9,064	3,199
Batting average	28.68	22.52
100s/50s	5/43	0/6
Top score	133	72*
Balls bowled	35,947	9,992
Wickets	583	297
Bowling average	30.37	25.24
5 wickets in innings	18	2
10 wickets in match	2	0
Best bowling	8/38	5/44
Catches/stumpings	138/–	47/–
- Source: Cricinfo, 5 December 2022

Anthonie Michal Ferreira (born 13 April 1955) is a former South African first-class cricketer. He spent eight seasons playing for Warwickshire where he was a solid middle order batsman and accurate and dependable medium pace bowler. He made 777 runs and took 79 wickets in 1984.

Preceded by Steve Waugh	Nelson Cricket Club; Professional; 1988	Succeeded by Jamie Brayshaw
