= Grant Long (cricketer) =

South African cricketer (born 1961)

Personal information
- Born: 16 February 1961 (age 65); Grahamstown, South Africa
- Source: Cricinfo, 6 December 2020

Grant Long (born 16 February 1961) is a South African former cricketer. He played in 36 first-class and 25 List A matches from 1979/80 to 1990/91.
