= Michael van Vuuren (cricketer) =

South African cricketer (born 1958)

Personal information
- Born: 20 August 1958 (age 68); Port Elizabeth, South Africa
- Source: Cricinfo, 12 December 2020

Michael van Vuuren (born 20 August 1958) is a South African cricketer. He played in 75 first-class and 63 List A matches from 1978/79 to 1991/92.
