= Ashok Patel =

Indian cricketer (born 1957)

Personal information
- Born: 6 March 1957 (age 69); Bhavnagar, India
- Batting: Right-handed
- Bowling: Right-arm offbreak
- Source: ESPNcricinfo, 6 March 2006

Ashok Kurjibhai Patel (born 6 March 1957) is a former Indian cricketer. He played domestic cricket for Saurashtra and played eight One Day Internationals for India in 1984–85. He is currently the coach of the Gujarat State Cricket Team. He is also currently the coach in All Stars, TX.
