= Brett Matthews (cricketer) =

South African cricketer (1962–2013)

Personal information
- Born: 5 July 1962; Cape Town, South Africa
- Died: 31 January 2013 (aged 50); Cape Town, South Africa
- Source: ESPNcricinfo, 10 June 2016

Brett Matthews (5 July 1962 – 31 January 2013) was a South African cricketer. He was a bowler. He played 38 first-class and 33 List A matches between 1984 and 1990. His brother, Craig Matthews, was also a professional cricketer. On New Year's Day 2013, he got into a car crash and entered a coma. He died a month later, on January 31, 2013.
