= Kevin McKenzie (cricketer) =

South African cricketer (1948–2026)

Personal information
- Born: 16 July 1948
- Died: 9 May 2026 (aged 77)
- Batting: Right-handed
- Relatives: Neil McKenzie (son)

Domestic team information
- Years: Team
- 1966–1987: Transvaal

Career statistics
Competition	FC	LA
Matches	133	95
Runs scored	6,756	1742
Batting average	36.51	28.55
100s/50s	13/34	1/8
Top score	188	109
Balls bowled	192	458
Wickets	1	14
Bowling average	133.00	31.42
5 wickets in innings	0	0
10 wickets in match	0	0
Best bowling	1/19	3/5
Catches/stumpings	141/0	28/0
- Source: Cricinfo

Kevin Alexander McKenzie (16 July 1948 – 9 May 2026) was a South African first-class cricketer whose career with Transvaal lasted from his first season in 1966–67 to the final one in 1986/87.

He is regarded as one of the best South African batsmen not to have played international cricket due to the country's sporting isolation during apartheid.

== Biography ==
A native of Pretoria, Kevin McKenzie was educated at Johannesburg's King Edward VII School and played for Transvaal in the Nuffield week, 1966 and 1967, also playing, in 1967, for the South African schools team. He played in 133 first-class matches, scoring 6756 runs at an average of 36.51. Batting right-handed in the lower middle order, he scored 13 centuries and 34 half centuries.

In Currie Cup cricket he was a key member of the "Mean Machine", the dominant Transvaal side of the 1980s, and played in 122 matches, scoring 6076 runs at an average of 36.38. He was described by player and commentator Robin Jackman as "one of the best hookers of the ball I've ever seen". He played for South Africa in 7 unofficial "Tests". McKenzie is the father of Neil McKenzie, South African international cricket player whose career extended from 1999 to 2009.

McKenzie died on 9 May 2026, at the age of 77.
