= Gauteng cricket team =

Cricket team

Central Gauteng (formerly Transvaal) is the first-class cricket team of the southern parts of Gauteng province of South Africa. The team was called Transvaal from April 1890 to April 1997 (the area north of Johannesburg, including Pretoria being part of the Northerns, formerly Northern Transvaal). Under the main competition's various names – the Currie Cup, then the Castle Cup, now the SuperSport Series – Transvaal/Gauteng cricket team has been the most successful of the South African domestic sides, winning 25 times. The club's most glorious period was the 1980s when they were dubbed the "Mean Machine".

For the purposes of the SuperSport Series, Gauteng merged with North West (formerly Western Transvaal) to form the Highveld Lions or, more simply, "the Lions" (from October 2004 to 2021). When the franchises were dissolved in 2021, the Lions name was applied to Central Gauteng alone.

== Current squad ==
Squad for 2026/27 Season. Players in bold have played international cricket.

Name	Nationality	Birth date	Batting style	Bowling style	Notes
Batters
**Temba Bavuma**	South Africa	17 May 1990 (age 36)	Right-handed	Right-arm seam	National Contract
Tiaan Brits	South Africa		Left-handed		
**Zubayr Hamza**	South Africa	19 June 1995 (age 31)	Right-handed	Right-arm wrist spin	Player of National Interest
**Reeza Hendricks**	South Africa	14 August 1989 (age 37)	Right-handed	Right-arm orthodox spin	
Richard Seletswane	South Africa	21 January 2005 (age 21)	Right-handed	Right-arm orthodox spin	
Mitchell van Buuren	South Africa	21 January 1998 (age 28)	Right-handed	Right-arm wrist spin	
**Rassie van der Dussen**	South Africa	7 February 1989 (age 37)	Right-handed	Right-arm wrist spin	
Wicket-keepers
**Quinton de Kock**	South Africa	7 December 1992 (age 33)	Left-handed		National Contract
**Connor Esterhuizen**	South Africa	31 May 2001 (age 25)	Right-handed		Player of National Interest
Dominic Hendricks	South Africa	12 July 1990 (age 36)	Left-handed	Right-arm orthodox spin	
Wandile Makwetu	South Africa	7 January 1999 (age 27)	Right-handed		
**Ryan Rickelton**	South Africa	11 July 1996 (age 30)	Left-handed		National Contract
All-rounders
**Bjorn Fortuin**	South Africa	21 October 1994 (age 31)	Right-handed	Left-arm orthodox spin	Player of National Interest
**Wiaan Mulder**	South Africa	19 February 1998 (age 28)	Right-handed	Right-arm seam	National Contract
Delano Potgieter	South Africa	5 August 1996 (age 30)	Left-handed	Right-arm seam	
Bowlers
**Gerald Coetzee**	South Africa	2 October 2000 (age 25)	Right-handed	Right-arm seam	Player of National Interest
**Kwena Maphaka**	South Africa	April 8, 2006 (age 20)	Left-handed	Left-arm seam	National Contract
**Nqaba Peter**	South Africa	December 9, 2001 (age 24)	Right-handed	Right-arm wrist spin	Player of National Interest
Siya Plaatjie	South Africa	February 18, 2001 (age 25)	Right-handed	Right-arm seam	
**Kagiso Rabada**	South Africa	May 5, 1995 (age 31)	Left-handed	Right-arm seam	National Contract
**Lutho Sipamla**	South Africa	May 12, 1998 (age 28)	Right-handed	Right-arm seam	Player of National Interest
**Codi Yusuf**	South Africa	April 10, 1998 (age 28)	Right-handed	Right-arm seam	Player of National Interest

== Honours ==
- Currie Cup (25) - 1889–90, 1894–95, 1902–03, 1903–04, 1904–05, 1906–07, 1923–24, 1925–26, 1926–27, 1929–30, 1934–35, 1950–51, 1958–59, 1968–69, 1970–71, 1971–72, 1972–73, 1978–79, 1979–80, 1982–83, 1983–84, 1984–85, 1986–87, 1987–88, 1999–00; shared (4) - 1921–22, 1937–38, 1965–66, 1969–70
- Standard Bank Cup (6) - 1981–82, 1982–83, 1984–85, 1992–93, 1997–98, 2003–04
- South African Airways Provincial Three-Day Challenge (2) - 2006–07, 2012–13; 'shared (1) – 2014-15
- South African Airways Provincial One-Day Challenge (1) - 2007–08
- Gillette/Nissan Cup (9) - 1973–74, 1978–79, 1979–80, 1980–81, 1982–83, 1983–84, 1984–85, 1985–86, 1990–91

== Former players ==
Among the notable players are: Clive Rice, Jimmy Cook, Sylvester Clarke, Graeme Pollock, Alvin Kallicharran, Roy Pienaar, Hugh Page, Richard Snell, Henry Fotheringham, Ray Jennings, Kevin McKenzie, Buster Nupen and Rohan Kanhai.

== Venues ==
Venues have included:

- Old Wanderers, Johannesburg (1891–1946)
- Berea Park, Pretoria (occasional venue Dec 1906 - Jan 1932; Northerns venue from 1937)
- Willowmoore Park, Benoni (occasional venue Dec 1923 - Dec 1931; Northerns venue from 1948)
- Ellis Park, Johannesburg (1946–1956)
- New Wanderers Stadium, Johannesburg (1956–present)
- Vereeniging Brick and Tile Recreation Ground (one game in 1966)
- New Wanderers No 1 Oval, Johannesburg (occasional venue Nov 1968 - Dec 1991)
- Strathvaal Cricket Club A Ground, Stilfontein (occasional venue Dec 1963 - March 1976)
- South African Defence Force Ground, Potchefstroom (one game in Dec 1972)
- Lenasia Stadium, Johannesburg South (occasional venue Jan 1977 - Nov 2002)
- George Lea Sports Club, Johannesburg (two games in 1983)
- Dick Fourie Stadium, Vereeniging (two matches 1989–1991)
- NF Oppenheimer Ground, Randjesfontein (three matches 1995–2004)

== Sources ==
- South African Cricket Annual – various editions
- Wisden Cricketers' Almanack – various editions
- "Cricinfo"
