= Bob Holland =

Australian cricketer

Personal information
- Born: 19 October 1946; Camperdown, New South Wales, Australia
- Died: 17 September 2017 (aged 70); Newcastle, New South Wales, Australia
- Batting: Right-handed
- Bowling: Legbreak, googly

International information
- National side: Australia
- Test debut (cap 326): 23 November 1984 v West Indies
- Last Test: 02 January 1986 v India
- ODI debut (cap 84): 15 January 1985 v West Indies
- Last ODI: 30 May 1985 v Australia

Domestic team information
- Years: Team
- 1978/79–1986/87: New South Wales
- 1987/88: Wellington

Career statistics
Competition	Test	ODI	FC	LA
Matches	11	2	95	12
Runs scored	35	–	706	5
Batting average	3.18	–	9.67	–
100s/50s	0/0	–	0/1	0/0
Top score	10	–	53	5*
Balls bowled	2,889	126	23,117	624
Wickets	34	2	316	21
Bowling average	39.76	49.50	31.19	21.61
5 wickets in innings	3	0	14	1
10 wickets in match	2	0	3	0
Best bowling	6/54	2/49	9/83	5/28
Catches/stumpings	5/–	0/–	54/–	0/–
- Source: CricInfo, 28 September 2013

Robert George Holland OAM (19 October 1946 – 17 September 2017) was a New South Wales and Australian cricketer. He was, because of his surname, nicknamed "Dutchy".

Holland, who spent the majority of his cricketing life in Newcastle, was a late bloomer, and his Test debut aged 38 made him the oldest Australian debutant in more than half a century. It was not until the 1978–79 season, aged 32, that the New South Wales selectors called up Holland to continue the state's long tradition of leg spin bowling. He quickly formed an integral part of the bowling attack that made the state the dominant domestic team in the Sheffield Shield in the 1980s. Forming a spin-oriented attack with Murray Bennett (left-arm orthodox) and Greg Matthews (off spin), Holland was part of the team that won the Sheffield Shield in 1982–83, 1984–85 and 1985–86. Holland finished his first-class career with a season with Wellington in New Zealand's domestic league.

== Career ==
When Holland was 15 he met Colin McCool, the player coach at Belmont Club. When he was 19 he played for Northern NSW against Mike Smith's 1965–66 MCC team. He represented Northern NSW in 1975–76 against the touring West Indian side as an opening batsman.

=== 1978–79 ===
Holland made his Shield debut in 1978–79, taking 1–113 against Queensland. It was the only first-class game he played that summer, the selectors preferring David Hourn and Graeme Beard as the NSW spinners.

=== 1979-80 ===
Holland played for NSW in the 1979–80 season. He took four wickets against Queensland, five against Victoria seven against Tasmania, three against the touring English and five against South Australia. He wound up taking 25 first-class wickets at 30.48.

=== 1980–81 ===
Holland's 4–30 helped NSW beat WA by an innings. He was left out of the McDonald's Cup side but was kept in the NSW Shield team. He took 5–82 against South Australia, his first five-wicket haul at first-class level.He took 30 wickets that summer at 31.03.

=== 1981–82 ===
Holland took six wickets in his first Shield game and four in his second, causing people to discuss him as a test prospect. He took 27 wickets that summer at 24.48.

=== 1982–83 ===
Highlights of this summer included 3–16 against Queensland. However, Holland had relative lack of success over this summer, taking only 16 wickets at 52.06 with a best of 4–100.

=== 1983–84 ===
Holland took his best figures to date, 7–56 against South Australia. There was some talk this would put him in contention to replace the Australian spinner, Tom Hogan. He took 24 wickets at 29.91.

=== 1984–85 season: West Indies ===
Holland began the 1984–85 Shield comp well with four wickets against South Australia.

Holland made his Test debut in the Second Test of the 1984–85 Australian season against the West Indies cricket team in Brisbane. He was relatively unsuccessful, taking 2/97 and scoring 6 and 0 as Australia suffered an eight wicket defeat.

He was retained for the Third Test in Adelaide, but after taking match figures of 2/163, he was dropped.

Holland went back to New South Wales and continued the form which had gained him Test selection in the first place. This included a tour match victory over the West Indies, after which both Holland and Bennett were selected for the Fifth Test at the Sydney Cricket Ground. The selectors had felt that the uncertain performance of the Caribbean batsmen during the tour match showed that they had a weakness against spin bowling, and introduced a "horses for courses" spin oriented attack on a dry Sydney pitch.

The West Indies had crushed Australian opposition throughout the summer, winning the first three Tests by an innings, eight wickets and 191 runs respectively. Furthermore, in the fourth Test, Australia had slumped to 8/198 chasing 370 to narrowly avoid defeat when time ran out. With pundits expecting another Australian failure, they won the toss and amassed 9/471. The West Indies were reduced to be all out for 163, with Holland taking 6/54 including Viv Richards, Desmond Haynes, Larry Gomes and captain Clive Lloyd. Forced to follow on, they fell for 253 in the second innings with Holland taking 4/90 to complete a ten wicket match haul. The New South Wales pair perplexed the tourists, taking 15 of the 20 wickets, as Australia took an unexpected innings victory.

Following his spin success at the SCG, he was selected to make his ODI debut on the same ground against the same team in the subsequent triangular tournament. With 0/50, he was the most expensive bowler in the match and did not play again in the season.

Holland took 59 first-class wickets that summer at 25.79.

=== 1985 Ashes ===
He was selected for the 1985 Ashes tour to England, but only had sporadic success. In the ODIs, he played only in the first match at Manchester. He took his only ODI wickets with 2/49 as Australia won, but was the most expensive bowler and was dropped.

He was not selected for the First Test, but was recalled for the Second Test at Lord's. He took 5/68 in the second innings, breaking a stubborn century partnership between Mike Gatting and Ian Botham to take the last four wickets and ensure Australia had a small target to chase, which they did successfully.

He was used mostly as a defensive option, and took few wickets with only a further wicket coming for the cost of 355 runs in the next three Tests, after which he was dropped for the final Sixth Test.

Holland took 29 first-class wickets on tour at 35.06.

=== 1985–86 season ===
He had another highlight upon his return to Australia for the 1985–86 season. After conceding 106 runs without success in the First Test as Australia lost by an innings, Holland took a 10 wicket match haul against New Zealand at the SCG, as Australia took a four wicket win to avoid being whitewashed by their neighbours. He took 6/106 in the first innings to reduce New Zealand to 9/169 before 4/68 in the second ensured Australia was able to chase the target.

He managed 3/90 and ended a run of five consecutive ducks in the Third Test but it was not enough to prevent Australia's first and only series loss to New Zealand.

He was dropped for start of the series against India in favor of Ray Bright but was recalled for the Third Test at the SCG, where he played his final Test. He failed to trouble the spin-proficient Indians, taking 1/113 as they amassed 600 and pushed for an innings victory when time ran out. His Test career spanned eleven Tests and consisted of unpenetrative streaks interspersed with wicket taking bursts. He took 34 wickets at 39.76, but excluding the Tests at Sydney, Lord's and Adelaide respectively mentioned earlier, the other eight Tests yielded only nine wickets.

He took 48 first-class wickets at 32.39 that summer.

Holland was overlooked for the tour of New Zealand and India. Cricket writer Phil Wilkins said that "ignoring Holland for India seemed indecent with its excessively demanding conditions and the siege mentality which so often applies to the game with its consuming hours of waiting and watching and working."

"I found I was very tired towards the end of last season," said Holland in October 1986. "I lost that bit of zip in my bowling, I was not doing enough to get people out, I was not spinning the ball as much."

He toured Zimbabwe and took 9 wickets at 26.77.

=== 1986–87 season ===
At the beginning of the 1986–87 summer, Holland expressed interest in being available for Australian selection. He was not picked; the selectors preferred Greg Matthews, Peter Sleep and Peter Taylor. He took 17 wickets at 45.05, with a best return of 6–86.

=== 1987–88 ===
Holland played one more season of first-class cricket, in New Zealand. He took 31 wickets at 23.80, with a best return of 7-69.

== Career summary ==
His bowling was marked by use of flight, a disciplined length and a variety of leg breaks, topspinners, and a googly that was used relatively sparsely. He took 316 wickets at 31.16 in 95 first-class matches. His batting was poor, averaging 9.67 at first-class level. He made five successive Test ducks—dubbed an "Olympic" due to the five naughts looking like the Olympic rings, an unfortunate Test record he jointly holds with Ajit Agarkar and Mohammad Asif—in a career yielding 35 runs at an average of 3.18, but his defiantly resistance effort in the 1984–85 Shield final helped ensure a New South Wales triumph.

== Personal life ==
Holland was a civil engineering surveyor, and was married to Carolyn, with three adult children named Craig, Rohan and Naomi. Rohan was named in honour of his cricketing hero, Rohan Kanhai, the former West Indian cricketer. Robert had five grandchildren. One of his grandchildren, Thomas Holland, was selected in 2014 as a high-school student to represent Australia in baseball (Under-15s).

Holland devoted much of his time to his local cricket club, Southern Lakes Cricket Club (now known as Toronto Workers Cricket Club), a club in Toronto, NSW. Holland was also a bowling coach involved with high school programs and coaching clinics around Australia.

In an international cricketing era where there were many instances of abrasive on-field behaviour, Holland was especially known and regarded for his sense of gentlemanly conduct and commitment.

In September 2006, Holland celebrated his 60th birthday with a celebrity cricket match with former teammates.

In August 2016, Holland and his wife were assaulted and hospitalised in Lake Macquarie. Holland had asked a man and a woman to stop riding motorcycles on the cricket ground where he volunteered as a curator. The pair were later arrested, found guilty, and jailed.

In March 2017, Holland was diagnosed with an aggressive brain cancer and underwent surgery, chemotherapy and radiotherapy. On 15 September 2017, a tribute night was hosted by Mark Taylor. A number of former teammates including Greg Matthews, Trevor Chappell, Wayne Phillips and Murray Bennett were in attendance. However, Holland suddenly deteriorated and died on 17 September 2017, just two days after the event. He died at the Mater Hospital in Newcastle.
