= Hugh Page =

South African cricketer (born 1962)

Cricket information
- Batting: Left-handed
- Bowling: Right-arm fast-medium

Career statistics
Competition	First-class	List A
Matches	92	121
Runs scored	2,205	1,020
Batting average	22.96	17.58
100s/50s	0/9	0/1
Top score	95	57
Balls bowled	13,993	5,994
Wickets	275	161
Bowling average	25.18	25.44
5 wickets in innings	5	1
10 wickets in match	0	0
Best bowling	7/38	5/45
Catches/stumpings	25/–	20/–
- Source: CricketArchive, 14 December 2019

Hugh Ashton Page (born 3 July 1962) is a former South African first class cricketer who was born in Rhodesia. He played his cricket with Transvaal and spent the 1987 English season with Essex.
