= Berea Park =

Multisport venue in Pretoria, South Africa

Berea Park is a former multi-sport venue in Pretoria, South Africa, on Lilian Ngoyi Street (earlier Van der Walt Street) near downtown. It was utilized by local sports teams in football/soccer, including Berea Park F.C., and cricket (North Eastern Transvaal). It is now derelict.

== History ==
In September 1882, a former cattle pasture a few minutes by horse-cart from Church Square was dedicated as a cricket field for Pretoria players. The land was owned by a widow named Hoffman and was part of a farm including what is now Fountains Valley. By the time Walter Read's England national team visited South Africa in 1892, the field was already known as Berea Park.

A Pretoria team played against the English visitors, in the first international cricket match in Pretoria, at the time the capital of the South African Republic (ZAR). The Pretoria team featured 22 players versus 11 on the Walter Read side. In the match, held from 29–30 January 1892, the Pretoria team won one turn and knocked 29 runs. In the 1906–07 season, the Currie Cup was held in Johannesburg and Pretoria, marking the beginning of domestic first-class cricket. The Northerns used the Park from the 1937-38 until the 1984-85 one, when their new stadium, Centurion Park, was built.

In 1897, the staff built the first clubhouse there. The first motor vehicle was exhibited in South Africa at Berea Park that same year. President Paul Kruger of the ZAR gave a speech for the occasion.

In 1903, South African Railways (now Transnet) purchased the Park as a sports ground for railway staff. The old clubhouse has since been used as a library, music room, and pub. The southern clubhouse was built in 1907, while the northern one was added in 1926, the year the Berea Rugby Club opened. A soccer team, the Pretoria South African Railways team, began using the field in 1918, and since 1935 Berea Park F.C. has competed in what was then called the Transvaal Soccer League.

== Fire ==
In the 1990s, the building was used for administration and conference hosting, but later the structures and grounds began to fall into disrepair. A combined girls' and boys' high school used the grounds until an April 2010 fire did great damage. Since then, the site and terrain have not been used at all.
