= Bruce Francis =

Australian cricketer (born 1948)

Personal information
- Full name: Bruce Colin Francis
- Born: 18 February 1948 (age 78); Mosman, New South Wales, Australia
- Batting: Right-handed
- Bowling: Right-arm medium
- Role: Batsman

International information
- National side: Australia
- Test debut (cap 258): 8 June 1972 v England
- Last Test: 13 July 1972 v England

Domestic team information
- Years: Team
- 1968/69–1974/75: New South Wales
- 1971–1973: Essex

Career statistics
Competition	Test	FC	LA
Matches	3	109	50
Runs scored	52	6,183	1,326
Batting average	10.40	33.97	30.13
100s/50s	0/0	13/31	2/6
Top score	27	210	107
Balls bowled	–	17	–
Wickets	–	1	–
Bowling average	–	15.00	–
5 wickets in innings	–	0	–
10 wickets in match	–	0	–
Best bowling	–	1/10	–
Catches/stumpings	1/–	42/–	11/–
- Source: Cricinfo, 1 March 2019

Bruce Colin Francis (born 18 February 1948) is a former Australian cricketer who played three Test matches on the Australian tour of England in 1972.

Francis was a hard-hitting opening batsman, who played for New South Wales from 1968–69 to 1972–73, Essex in 1971 and 1973, and toured South Africa with the D.H. Robins XI in 1973-74 and 1974–75.

A political science graduate, Francis helped Kerry Packer organise World Series Cricket, became James Packer's private cricket coach, and later helped organise the "rebel" Australian tours to South Africa in 1985-86 and 1986–87.

Francis also provided a response to the World Anti-Doping Agency's ban on 34 past and present players of Australian Football League (AFL) club Essendon.

== Sources ==
- Hartman, R. (2006) Ali: The Life of Ali Bacher, Penguin: Johannesburg. ISBN 9780143025160.
