= Tom Hogan =

Australian cricketer (born 1956)

Personal information
- Full name: Tom George Hogan
- Born: 23 September 1956 (age 70); Merredin, Western Australia
- Batting: Right-handed
- Bowling: Slow left-arm orthodox

International information
- National side: Australia
- Test debut (cap 318): 22 April 1983 v Sri Lanka
- Last Test: 28 April 1984 v West Indies
- ODI debut (cap 73): 31 January 1983 v New Zealand
- Last ODI: 5 October 1984 v India

Domestic team information
- Years: Team
- 1981–1990: Western Australia

Career statistics
Competition	Tests	ODIs	FC	LA
Matches	7	16	80	44
Runs scored	205	72	1,756	217
Batting average	18.63	9.00	20.18	11.42
100s/50s	0/0	0/0	1/6	0/0
Top score	42*	27	115*	33
Balls bowled	1436	917	17,442	2,404
Wickets	15	23	209	51
Bowling average	47.06	24.95	35.87	31.56
5 wickets in innings	1	0	9	0
10 wickets in match	0	0	0	0
Best bowling	5/66	4/33	8/86	4/33
Catches/stumpings	2/–	10/–	52/–	20/–
- Source: CricketArchive, 24 October 2013

Tom George Hogan (born 23 September 1956) is a former Australian cricketer.

Hogan was a left arm spinner who played in seven Tests and 16 One Day Internationals for Australia in 1983 and 1984. According to one appraisal, "Hogan not only helped Western Australia win a few Sheffield Shields, he won Australia a Test match with his bowling, helped save another two with his batting, and played a key role in winning Australia several ODIs, including a whole series in India."

== Career ==
Hogan made his debut for Western Australia in 1981–82. In his first Shield game he earned figures of 0–77 against Victoria in a game where Julian Wiener and Jeff Moss both scored double centuries. Hogan's second game was more successful for him, taking 4–64 against Tasmania and helping bowl WA to a victory. In his third game, against Victoria, Hogan took six wickets and scored 70. Hogan took 20 wickets at 36.75 for the 1981–82 season. In a McDonald's Cup match against Victoria, Hogan's innings of 25 runs off 21 balls also helped WA win a narrow run chase.

Hogan had a strong 1982–83 summer. He scored 72 against NSW and took eight wickets against Qld.

Towards the end of January Hogan was picked in Australia's one day team to play New Zealand, replacing Dennis Lillee who was made 12th man. He took 2–42 and made 4 not out, in a game Australia lost. Hogan was kept on in the squad. He was picked on a 1983 tour of Sri Lanka, one of two spinners (the other was Bruce Yardley). By the end of the summer he had taken 35 first class wickets at 26.82 – out of all Australian spinners in first class cricket that season, only Bruce Yardley and Murray Bennett had taken more.

=== Sri Lanka Tour ===
Hogan was picked in the first ODI. He had an excellent game, scoring 27 off 25 balls, taking a catch and earning bowling figures of 3–27. Things were harder in the 2nd ODI, Hogan going for 1–62.

He took 3–37 and 3–42 in a tour game against the Sri Lankan Board President's XI. He was selected in the test, bowling in tandem with Yardley. Hogan struggled in his first innings, going for 1–51, but did superbly in the second, taking 5–66 and helping Australia win by an innings. He made 12 wickets at 16 for the tour, Australia's best performing bowler.

These efforts saw Hogan picked as the sole specialist spinner for the 1983 World Cup. He was selected over Bruce Yardley, who then retired from international cricket.

=== 1983 World Cup ===
Hogan did not play for Australia in the initial games but was eventually picked to play against India, taking the place of Dennis Lillee who was made 12th man. Hogan's figures were 2–48. He kept his place for the next game, against Zimbabwe, taking 2–33. Hogan got 1–31 in the loss against India and 1–60 against West Indies.

=== 1983–84 Summer ===
Hogan was picked in the Australian side for the first test against the touring Pakistan side. However captain Kim Hughes decided on using an all-pace attack and Hogan was made 12th man. Australia won the game easily and kept the same twelve for the second club. Hogan took 3–91 and 1–107 in a shield game and was 12th man again as Australia used four pace bowlers.

An injury to Carl Rackemann saw Hogan selected for the 3rd test. He suffered badly at the hands of the Pakistan batsman, going for 1–107 and was dropped for the squad for the fourth and fifth test in favour of Murray Bennett and Greg Matthews.

Hogan was later dropped from the Australian one day team. However he bounced back with 5–31 against Victoria and wound up with 26 first class wickets at 33 for the summer. He took more first class wickets than any other Australian spinner.

Hogan was picked on the 1984 tour of West Indies. He and Greg Matthews would be the spinners; Murray Bennett, Peter Sleep and Bob Holland, who had also had strong domestic seasons, were overlooked. He also worked his way back into the one day team, taking 1–22 against Pakistan and 0–31 and 6 runs in a thrilling tie against the West Indies. He went for 0–39 in the last ODI final.

=== 1984 tour of the West Indies ===
Hogan was the sole specialist spinner in the Australian squad, and thus had an excellent chance of being given an extended run in the test team. He bowled poorly in the opening tour game against Leeward Islands but then took 5–95 against Guyana, almost forcing a victory and out bowling Matthews. He was picked in the side for the first test.

Australia batted first and were 9–182 when Hogan combined with Rodney Hogg for a partnership of 97, a record tenth wicket stand for Australia against the West Indies (Hogan made 42), and took the total to 279. Hogan took 4–56 in the West Indies first innings, bowling very well. However Australia's batters collapsed again, Hogan went for 0–76 in the second innings and Australia were lucky to escape with a draw. Hogan was awarded Man of the Match for the test.

In the second test, Hogan went for 2–103 but his second innings of 38, coming in as nightwatchman, proved crucial in helping Australia escape with a draw. In the third test he again made useful runs as nightwatchman, 40 in Australia's first innings, but went for 0–97 as Australia crashed to defeat. In the fourth test he took 0–65 and in the 5th took 2–68.

He played in the 3rd and 4th ODIs, taking 0–31 and 0–31.

Hogan took 22 wickets at 39.45 for the tour (the second highest wicket taker) and 8 at 60 for the series (the third highest wicket taker).

He was picked in the 14 man squad to tour India for a series of one day matches; he and Bennett were the spinners.

=== 1984 tour of India ===
Hogan took 4–33 in a tour game. He bowled well in the series, taking 3–44 in the first ODI 4–33 in the second, and 2–40 in the 4th. Australia won the series 3–0.

=== Rebel tours ===
Hogan was thought to be a "certain inclusion" for the squad for the first test against the West Indies in 1984–85. However he was overlooked when Australia went for an all pace attack. Murray Bennett and Bob Holland would be Australia's preferred spinners that summer; they and Greg Matthews were selected on the 1985 tour of England. Hogan took 26 wickets that season but at a very expensive average of 51.

After being left out of the Australian team, Hogan joined the Australian rebel tours to South Africa for two seasons (1985–86 and 1986–87). He replaced Bennett, who had originally signed to go but changed his mind after his international prospects improved. He and Trevor Hohns were the two spinners. He was banned from test cricket for three years and Shield cricket for two years.

Hogan began the tour excellently scoring 74 off 77 balls in a tour game against Transvaal Country and making 63 and taking 8–89 against Eastern Province. His form dropped away and he took 16 wickets at 38.6 in the first summer- although he still performed better than Trevor Hohns.

Hogan did not recover his form on the second tour, taking 10 first class wickets at 39.4. He was easily out bowled by Hohns who took 33 wickets.

In 1987 he played in the Lancashire League for Lowerhouse.

=== Later career ===
Hogan – along with the other South African rebels – was overlooked for selection in WA's team for the first Sheffield Shield game of the 1987–88 summer. He was picked to play against Sri Lanka but did not bowl. He was kept in the team to play Tasmania and took 6–57. Hogan said he had been as "nervous as a newcomer" and had not bowled well early. "But once I dropped on to a length my confidence came back and I was able to get quite a bit of turn, especially from a spot just short of a length outside the off stump from the river end," he said. "It's the first time I've bowled in a first-class match for West Australia this season because when we were in the field against Sri Lanka I had to dash off to hospital because my wife, Helen, was having a baby." He took nine first class wickets for the summer at 22.66 and WA won the Sheffield Shield.

In 1988–89 he played the first five games for WA and took 12 wickets at 30 before being dropped. He got back into the team to end the summer with 14 wickets at 36.5. He also scored his maiden first class century, 115 against Victoria. Greg Chappell and Richie Benaud both listed Hogan in their squads to tour England in 1989 but in the final event Tim May and Trevor Hohns were taken as spinners. Hogan did help WA win the Shield for a third consecutive time and he got to tour India with a WA team.

In 1989–90 Hogan took 18 wickets at 35.6 with a best of 5–60. His last first class game was in 1990–91.

== Later career ==
Hogan was appointed a WA selector in 2003–04.
