= Trevor Hohns =

Australian cricketer (born 1954)

Personal information
- Born: 23 January 1954 (age 72); Nundah, Queensland, Australia
- Height: 178 cm (5 ft 10 in)
- Batting: Left-handed
- Bowling: Leg-spin
- Role: All rounder

International information
- National side: Australia
- Test debut (cap 345): 26 January 1989 v West Indies
- Last Test: 24 August 1989 v England

Career statistics
Competition	Test	First-class
Matches	7	152
Runs scored	136	5,210
Batting average	22.66	27.13
100s/50s	0/0	2/30
Top score	40	103
Balls bowled	1,528	24,172
Wickets	17	288
Bowling average	34.11	37.15
5 wickets in innings	0	11
10 wickets in match	0	1
Best bowling	3/59	6/56
Catches/stumpings	3/0	86/0
- Source: CricInfo, 19 August 2020

Trevor Victor Hohns (born 23 January 1954) is a former Queensland and Australian cricketer who played in seven Test matches as a spin bowler, and was later Australia's chairman of selectors.

Earlier in his career when Hohns was a relatively obscure player on the fringes of Queensland cricket, he signed up to play for the Rebel Australians during the controversial South African series in 1985–86 and 1986–87 during the Apartheid reign. Hohns was one of only two spin bowlers in the touring party, along with former Australian Test left-arm spinner, Tom Hogan. Hohns was one of the Rebel Australians banned from playing state and Test cricket for the following two years.

Hohns played all of his seven tests in 1989, making his international debut at the age of 35. He played in the final two tests of the 1988–89 series against the West Indies, and in five tests of the 1989 Ashes series in England. Although most of the bowling success in that series was due to the fast bowling trio of Terry Alderman, Geoff Lawson and Merv Hughes, Hohns took 11 wickets, and averaged 31.75 with the bat.

Hohns also was a handy late-order batsman, often batting as high as number six for Queensland in Sheffield Shield cricket. He finished his first-class career with two centuries and 30 half-centuries from 152 matches, though 40 was his best Test score among his seven innings.

Hohns has also had impact on Australian cricket as a selector. He has been a selector from 1994 to 2006, and 2014 to the present (2021); and chairman of selectors from 1996 to 2006, and 2016 to 2021. In his first term as chairman he made several tough decisions, including ending the careers of Ian Healy and Mark Waugh and stripping Steve Waugh of the one-day captaincy.

== Career ==
Hohns made his first class debut for Queensland when just seventeen, during the 1972–73 season. His first game was against the touring Pakistan team and he played several Sheffield Shield matches that summer as a specialist batter.

Hohns played some matches in 1973-74 but was out of the Queensland team until 1976-77 when he played three first class games. That summer he began bowling. Hohns became a Queensland regular over the 1977–78 season and maintained that position for the majority of the rest of his career.

In January 1980 it was announced Tasmania were seeking to lure Hohns to its state but he remained in Queensland.

Hohns scored 103 in the 1984-85 Sheffield Shield final, which Queensland lost. Hohns would also play in the finals in 1983–84, and 1987–88.

In May 1985 it was announced Hohns had signed to play cricket in South Africa in a rebel Australian XI team, replacing Murray Bennett who had signed to the tour but pulled out. This led to Hohns being banned from international cricket for three years, and Australian domestic cricket for two years.

Hohns' first summer in South Africa only earned him 9 first class wickets at 43.88 (plus 206 runs at 25.75); he played in one unofficial test and took no wickets. However he was very successful in 1986-87 taking 33 wickets at 24.81 along with 257 runs at 32.12. He was man of the match in the third unofficial test, taking 6-98 and 3-27 almost bowling Australia XI to victory.

In 1987 Hohns retired to focus on his business and missed the first four Sheffield Shield games. However his grade cricket form was strong and in December 1987 he returned to the Queensland team as vice captain.

=== Test cricketer ===
In 1988-89 Australia was trailing the visiting West Indies 3-0 and the fourth test would be at the SCG, which traditionally favourred spin. Hohns took 7–130 in a game for Queensland against the West Indies. By this stage he had taken 18 wickets that summer at 26.50 while Australia's other leading leg spinner at the time, Peter Sleep, had 11 wickets at 54.19. Hohns was selected in the test team for the 4th test at the age of 35 making him the 14th-oldest player to represent Australia. His career tally was 230 wickets at 37.69. "I didn't think I'd make an Australian side at this stage of life," said Hohns. "But you never give up hope."

Australian captain Allan Border said Hohns had improved as a bowler since he went to South Africa. "He's one player who has come back a better cricketer," Border said, "he's become a more complete bowler." Tim May, Peter Taylor and Hohns were selected in the team, but May was made 12th man.

In his test debut, Hohns took four wickets, all of top-six batters, but it was Allan Border who wound up getting eleven wickets in the game, which was won by Australia.

Hohns and Tim May were the spinners for the 5th test, which ended in a draw with Hohns taking 2–106. Both Hohns and May were selected as Australia's spinners on the 1989 Ashes tour, with Peter Taylor being omitted.

Hohns was overlooked for the first test in England but was picked in the second. He only bowled 20 overs and did not take a wicket but was kept in the team for the remainder of the series. In the 3rd test, a draw, Hohns took a wicket but scored 40 with the bat. In the 4th test Hohns took 3-59 (including bowling Ian Botham for 0), and 1-35. In the fifth test he took four wickets again, the Sydney Morning Herald reporting Hohns "is enjoying a wonderful Indian summer to his career... an integral part in Australia's monumental retrieval of the Ashes." Hohns took two wickets for the sixth test, giving him 11 wickets at 27.27 for the series, equal second in the Australian averages with Geoff Lawson. Hohns made 393 first class runs on the tour at 28.07 and took 26 wickets at 31.11.

Terry Alderman later said, "Border showed tremendous faith in Trevor Hohns, and this confidence was reflected in his bowling. It's vital for spinners, particularly leg-spinners, to feel confident." Geoff Marsh later said, "Tim May had broken down and there was talk of getting a replacement spinner from Australia. But AB said 'no, we picked Cracker (Trevor Hohns) and we are going to stick to the team that was picked.' Hohns appreciated the faith Border showed in him, and he ended up being a magnificent player. That was typical of Border's positive attitude." The Age reporter Martin Blake called Hohns "the surprise packet" of the tour. "Batting, bowling, fielding were invaluable. A real professional."

Hohns retired from cricket at the end of the 1989 tour. He returned to play one more season in 1990–91, as Queensland captain and making himself unavailable for international selection. Ian Chappell wrote in October 1990 that Hohns was "bowling tidly as always" and "in the absence of any other challengers I would pick him on home pitch for first test. He and Greg Matthews coulld be ideal combination when two spinners required." During the summer Allan Border expressed a desire for Hohns to make himself available for the Ashes and the subsequent tour of the West Indies saying the team "lacked ... a quality leg-spinner, and Trevor's the premier bloke around. We've talked to him about it but he's adamant that he only came out of retirement because Queensland made the call to him." Hohns refused to play international cricket. He took 23 wickets at 33.08 but making only 156 runs at 14.18. Queensland failed to win the Sheffield Shield.

In June 1991 Hohns retired again from first class cricket.

== Selector ==
In 1993 Hohns became an Australian selector. In September 1995 he replaced Lawrie Sawle as chairman of selectors.
