= Rod McCurdy =

Australian cricketer (born 1959)

Personal information
- Full name: Rodney John McCurdy
- Born: 30 December 1959 (age 66); Melbourne, Victoria, Australia
- Batting: Right-handed
- Bowling: Right-arm fast-medium
- Role: Bowler

International information
- National side: Australia
- ODI debut (cap 85): 27 January 1985 v West Indies
- Last ODI: 29 March 1985 v India

Domestic team information
- Years: Team
- 1979/80: Victoria
- 1979: Derbyshire
- 1980/81: Tasmania
- 1981/82–1983/84: Victoria
- 1984/85: South Australia
- 1986/87–1990/91: Eastern Province
- 1991/92: Natal
- 1992/93: Border

Career statistics
Competition	ODI	FC	LA
Matches	11	86	108
Runs scored	33	725	252
Batting average	8.25	10.21	14.82
100s/50s	0/0	0/1	0/0
Top score	13*	55	42
Balls bowled	515	16,779	5729
Wickets	12	305	171
Bowling average	31.25	29.85	22.77
5 wickets in innings	0	16	8
10 wickets in match	0	0	0
Best bowling	3/19	7/55	5/15
Catches/stumpings	1/–	25/–	13/–
- Source: ESPNcricinfo, 5 August 2011

Rodney John McCurdy (born 30 December 1959) is a former first-class cricketer who played for Australia, Border, Derbyshire, Eastern Province, Natal, South Australia, Tasmania and Victoria. He now lives in South Africa.

A fast bowler, he played in 11 One Day Internationals in the mid-1980s and later joined in the South African rebel tours in 1985.

== Career ==
In 1979, McCurdy was in England when, while playing at club level for Pudsey St Lawrence in Yorkshire also appeared at the county level for Derbyshire and Shropshire.

McCurdy represented Australia's U-19 team. He played for Victoria before moving to Tasmania, for whom he took 7–81 against the touring New Zealanders in 1980–81.

He returned to Victoria for the 1981–82 season. During the 1984–85 summer, McCurdy signed to play in South Africa.

McCurdy was selected in the original squad to tour England in 1985. However, his South African commitments meant he was unable to tour. McCurdy:

It always bugs me. I was picked on the Ashes tour. Would I have gone there? Yes, I was going there. We would have loved to have gone there, played in the Ashes, and come out to South Africa afterward. At least I would have had my opportunity. That's a disappointment for me.

McCurdy stayed in South Africa after the tour playing for Eastern Province and joined the rebel tours in South Africa in 1985–86 and 1986–87, defying the international sporting boycott of the apartheid state.

He later ran a security business in Port Elizabeth, making alarms for homes and small businesses. He then moved to Johannesburg to work as operations manager of Tellytrack, the racing television station.
