= Carl Rackemann =

Australian cricketer (born 1960)

Personal information
- Full name: Carl Gray Rackemann
- Born: 3 June 1960 (age 66); Wondai, Queensland, Australia
- Height: 190 cm (6 ft 3 in)
- Batting: Right-handed
- Bowling: Right-arm fast

International information
- National side: Australia
- Test debut (cap 316): 26 November 1982 v England
- Last Test: 4 January 1991 v England
- ODI debut (cap 70): 9 January 1983 v New Zealand
- Last ODI: 10 January 1991 v England

Domestic team information
- Years: Team
- 1979/80–1995/96: Queensland
- 1995: Surrey

Career statistics
Competition	Test	ODI
Matches	12	52
Runs scored	53	34
Batting average	5.29	2.83
100s/50s	0/0	0/0
Top score	15*	9*
Balls bowled	2,719	2,791
Wickets	39	82
Bowling average	29.15	22.35
5 wickets in innings	3	1
10 wickets in match	1	0
Best bowling	6/86	5/16
Catches/stumpings	2/–	6/–
- Source: CricInfo, 12 December 2005

Carl Gray Rackemann OAM (born 3 June 1960) is a former Queensland and Australian cricketer. He was a fast bowler in 12 Test matches, 52 One Day Internationals and 167 first-class cricket matches in a career spanning 1979/80 to 1995/96.

== International career ==
Rackemann, a well built fast bowler, was born in Wondai, Queensland. He made his Test debut versus England at Brisbane in 1982 and was consistently picked for the national side, mainly for One Day Internationals, until 1985. He was the leading wicket taker during the 1984–85 tour of India.

He signed up to play in the rebel tours of South Africa (1985–86 and 1986–87), thereby becoming ineligible to be a member of the official Australian team during that time.

Rackemann came back into the Australian team in 1989, being picked for that year's Ashes tour to England. In the 2nd innings of the Test against New Zealand in Perth in 1989–90, he achieved the bowling analysis of 31 overs, 21 maidens, 23 runs and 1 wicket.

He was well known for being a poor batsman, making only 53 runs in his 14 test innings, with a highest score of 15 not out. Ironically, in spite of this reputation, Rackemann's last test innings in 1991 helped Australia to retain the Ashes, his stubborn 102-ball second-innings 9 helping Australia secure the draw that they needed in the third test at Sydney.

== Queensland career ==
Rackemann held the Queensland state record of 425 wickets until overtaken by Michael Kasprowicz. Rackemann's last game for Queensland was the 1994–95 Sheffield Shield Final. Queensland won this match and the Shield for the first time. This was a relief for Rackemann as he had played in four of Queensland's previous final defeats.

He played English county cricket for Surrey 2nd XI in 1981 and Surrey in 1995 and was briefly recalled to the Australian side in 1995 for their tour of the West Indies due to a fast bowling injury crisis.

After his playing career, he went on to the national coaching position for the Zimbabwean national cricket team for two seasons from 2000. He has now returned to farming in Queensland and is also an after dinner speaker. He has inspired an expatriate Australian cricket team in London "Carl Rackemann All Stars (CRAS)"

== Politics ==
Rackemann stood as a Katter's Australian Party candidate in the electoral district of Nanango during the 2012 Queensland state election. His attempt was unsuccessful.
