= Steve Rixon =

Australian cricketer (born 1954)

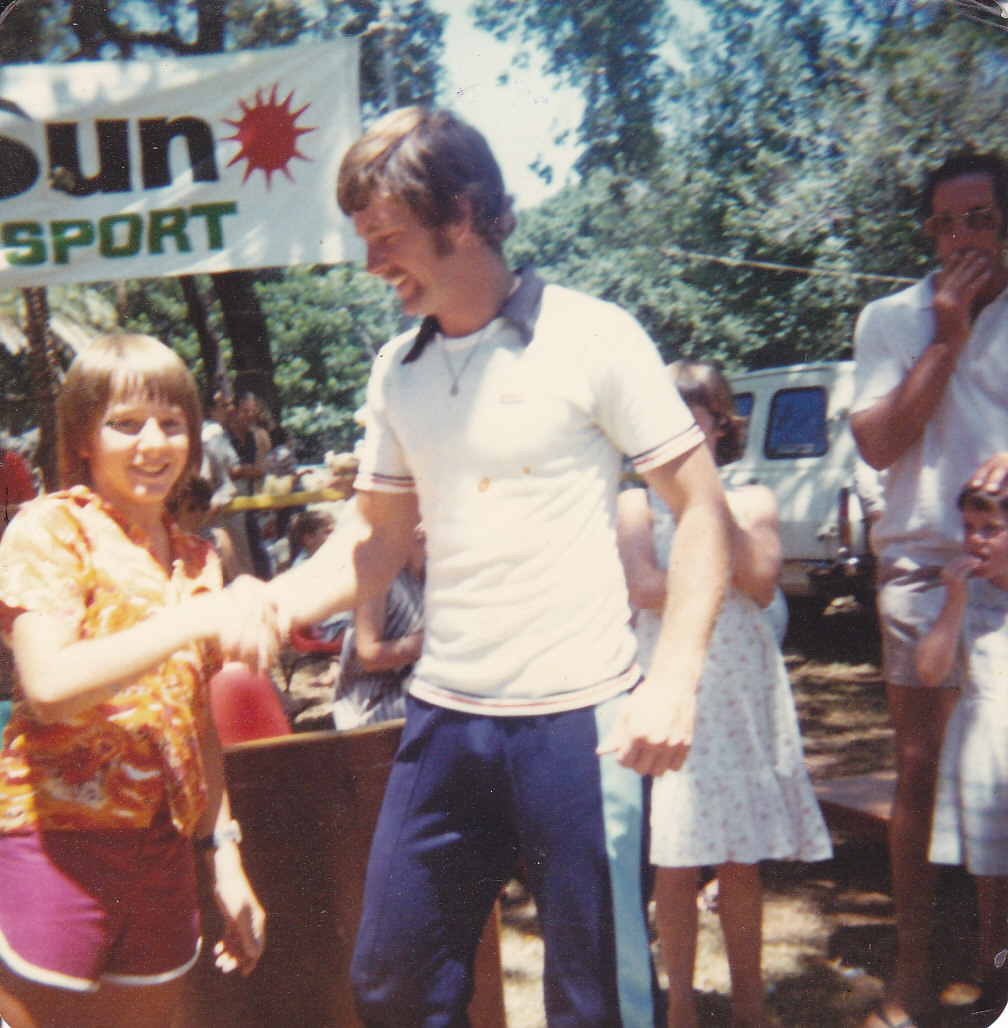
- Rixon c. 1976

Personal information
- Full name: Stephen John Rixon
- Born: 25 February 1954 (age 72); Albury, Australia
- Batting: Right-handed
- Role: Wicket-keeper

International information
- National side: Australia
- Test debut (cap 287): 2 December 1977 v India
- Last Test: 30 December 1984 v West Indies
- ODI debut (cap 43): 22 February 1978 v West Indies
- Last ODI: 29 March 1985 v India

Domestic team information
- Years: Team
- 1974/75–1987/88: New South Wales

Career statistics
Competition	Test	ODI	FC
Matches	13	6	151
Runs scored	394	40	4,303
Batting average	18.76	13.33	23.13
100s/50s	0/2	0/0	6/14
Top score	54	20*	128
Catches/stumpings	42/5	9/2	394/66
- Source: CricInfo, 20 May 2026

Stephen John Rixon (born 25 February 1954) is an Australian cricket coach and former international cricketer. He played in 13 Test matches and six One Day Internationals between 1977 and 1985. He has coached New Zealand, New South Wales, Surrey, Hyderabad Heroes and the Chennai Super Kings in the Indian Cricket League, and has been the fielding coach of the Australian, Pakistani and Sri Lankan national teams.

== Career ==
Rixon first came to public attention as a 16-year-old during the 1970/71 Marylebone Cricket Club tour of Australia, when England's wicket-keeper Alan Knott applauded Rixon's efforts for a Southern New South Wales team against the MCC. Rixon subsequently moved to Sydney to play initially for Waverley before transferring to Western Suburbs. Rixon made his first class debut in 1974–75. He made a first class century, 115, but only scored 232 runs at 17.8 for the season. He took 27 catches and made 4 stumpings.

In 1976-77 Rixon scored 128 in a Shield game.

In 1977, the leading Australian players were signed to World Series Cricket which led to them being banned from official cricket. These players included the then-Australian wicketkeeper Rod Marsh and the reserve keeper on the 1977 Ashes, Richie Robinson. There was a position open for test wicketkeeper. Leading contenders included the experienced John Maclean, the Queensland captain, and Rixon.

Rixon was picked in the first test against India in 1977–78. He scored 9 and 5 with the bat but took five catches in a narrow Australian victory.

In the second test, Rixon scored 50 runs in the first innings, taking part in a valuable 101 partnership with captain Bob Simpson. He took six catches and his second innings knock of 23 was crucial in helping Australia win by 2 wickets. In the third test he took four catches and scored 11 and 12. In the 4th he scored 17 and 11 and took 2 catches. In the final test, which Australia won, he scored 32 and 13 and took 5 catches.

Rixon kept his place on the subsequent tour of the West Indies. In the first test he scored 1 and 0, took two catches and a stumping. In the second he made 16 and 0. In the third he scored 54 (Australia's second top score of the innings) and 39 not out, the latter runs especially crucial in guiding Australia to a three wicket victory. In the fourth test he scored 21 and 13 not out. In the final test he scored 13 not out, took four catches and made a stumping.

Rixon was not selected for the 1978-79 Ashes, the selectors preferring John Maclean, and then Kevin Wright. Wright took the position of wicketkeeper for the 1979 tours of England and India. Rod Marsh returned to the test team in 1979-80 and remained Australia's first choice keeper until his retirement in 1984.

Rixon was back up wicketkeeper on the 1981 Ashes tour of England.

In 1981-82 Rixon captained NSW in the absence of Rick McCosker.

Rod Marsh elected not to tour Sri Lanka in 1982. However, the selectors picked Roger Woolley as keeper instead of Rixon. Marsh announced his retirement in 1984 prior to the tour of the West Indies. Australia picked Woolley as the keeper, with Wayne Phillips as reserve. During that tour, Woolley was injured before the first test and Phillips was picked as keeper. Phillips ended up playing four tests in that position, scoring a century in one of them. He played one test as a specialist with Woolley keeping.

Phillips' performances was seen to be one of the few successes of the 1984 West Indies tour, and Australia kept him on as wicketkeeper for the first two tests against the West Indies at home over the 1984-85 summer. Phillips was then injured and Rixon was recalled to replace him for the third test. This followed Rixon scoring a century in the Sheffield Shield.

Rixon scored 0 and 16 but took 7 catches. In the fourth test he scored 0 and 17. In the fifth test, which Australia won, he scored 20, took three catches and made a stumping.

Rixon was selected on the 1985 Ashes tour of England as reserve keeper, with Phillips as first choice. Then Rixon announced he had signed to play for two seasons in South Africa. He was dropped from the Ashes squad and banned from first class cricket in Australia for two seasons.

Rixon played for the Australian XI in the rebel tour of South Africa over two summers, 1985–86 and 1986–87, but on his return was unable to rejoin the national team.

He returned to NSW for the 1987–88 season but only played three first class games.

== Coaching career ==
Since retiring from playing, he has been the coach of the New Zealand cricket team, New South Wales, Surrey, Hyderabad Heroes of the Indian Cricket League and currently, The Scots College, Sydney.

It was also reported that Rixon was interested in taking over the head coaching job of the Australian cricket team when John Buchanan left at the end of the 2006/07 Ashes series. He was not appointed and instead Tim Nielsen took over.

In the Indian Premier League, he coached the Hyderabad Heroes and later the Chennai Super Kings.

On 28 June 2011, he was appointed Fielding Coach of the Australian Cricket Team replacing Mike Young. In 2014 Rixon was dropped from the Australian coaching set up.

On 15 June 2016, he was appointed the Fielding Coach of the Pakistan Cricket Team under the recommendation of the new head coach, Mickey Arthur. He worked as the Pakistan cricket fielding coach until June 2018. In December 2018, he was appointed fielding coach of Sri Lanka cricket team, and on 14 March 2019 he was handed the coaching duties halfway through the Sri Lanka tour of South Africa.
