= International cricket in South Africa from 1971 to 1981 =

Cricket in South Africa

International cricket in South Africa between 1971 and 1981 consisted of four private tours arranged by English sports promoter Derrick Robins, two tours by a private team called the "International Wanderers", and one women's Test match. The apartheid policy followed by the South African Governments of the day meant that no Test match playing nation was willing to tour, thereby depriving world cricket of leading stars such as Graeme Pollock, Barry Richards, Clive Rice and Eddie Barlow.

== The road to isolation ==
Sport in South Africa had been divided on racial lines since the early white settlers, and cricket was no different.

While Walter Read's Englishmen played against a non-white team, the Malays, in 1891-92, it would be 65 years before non-white South Africans played any other international cricket, with a team of Kenyan Asians touring against South African non-whites in 1956. However, with apartheid becoming ever stricter over time and being legally mandated in 1948, no non-white player was selected for the national Test team. This did not, however, stop white-majority Commonwealth nations from playing white South African teams at cricket.

The Basil D'Oliveira affair changed all that. D'Oliveira was a mixed-race South African (partly black – "coloured" under the Apartheid classification): as he was ineligible to play for his national side, he emigrated to England and played for them instead, going on tour to the West Indies in 1967. His performance on that tour was not impressive, and he was omitted from the Ashes Test squads in the following summer until the fifth and final Test at the Oval. He scored 158 in that Test, and was expected to make it into the team to tour South Africa in winter. When initially he was not selected, there was great controversy in England, with D'Olivera being left in tears at the news, and English Test selectors and cricket officials being accused of pandering to the racism of the apartheid regime in South Africa. Then, when a vacancy became available after Tom Cartwright broke down during a County Cricket match, D'Oliveira was selected in his place. Upon hearing of this, South African Prime Minister John Vorster responded to his selection by saying that it was not a team of the Marylebone Cricket Club, but of the anti-apartheid Movement: England's tour was eventually cancelled.

However, Australia did tour in 1969/70, with the Springboks whitewashing them 4-0, making them de facto world champions of cricket. After this triumph, they did not play another official Test match for 22 years. Their tour to England was called off in 1970, with England hastily arranging a tour by a Rest of the World team which itself included three South Africans and South African-born Tony Greig (who represented England in Test cricket).

In September 1970, Garry Sobers, the West Indies' captain and their best cricketer caused controversy by playing in a double-wicket competition in Rhodesia. Although Sobers spent only 48 hours in Salisbury, he had time for a meal with the prime minister, Ian Smith, and described him as a great man to talk to. Sobers' statement and his participation in the tournament caused backlash from Caribbean politicians who were vehemently opposed to apartheid and racism, with Guyanese prime minister Forbes Burnham saying Sobers was not welcome in his country until there was an apology, while the Jamaican government called for Sobers' resignation or ouster as captain, and the Indian prime minister, Indira Gandhi, barred the Indian cricket team from touring the West Indies until the matter was resolved. While Sobers initially argued that he had done nothing wrong as he was a cricketer, not a politician, he ultimately apologised in October 1970 when the scandal threatened to break up the West Indies Cricket Board.

In the 1970s and 1980s, the South African Cricket Board ran a competition called the Howa Bowl, which was contested between non-white teams.

== 1971 ==
South Africa tried to tour Australia in 1971, even going as far as suggesting that two black players, Dik Abed and Owen Williams were part of the team. Abed and Williams rejected the proposal. The tour was cancelled by the Australian Cricket Board of Control amid safety concerns. Also in 1971 Englishman Colin Cowdrey wanted to take a racially mixed team to South Africa and play separate black and white national teams. However, the coloured Board rejected the idea and persuaded Basil D'Oliveira to distance himself from it. Frank Waring, the Minister of Sport, declared that if cricketers from club level upwards declared that they were in favour of racially integrated cricket and their authorities, "Came to me and stated that this was the position, then I am fully prepared to take this matter to Cabinet".

On 3 May 1971 the Rest of South African XI and Currie Cup champions Transvaal walked off the field at Newlands to protest against the government's sports policies. Charles Fortune, renowned South African commentator, suggested that it would be best to walk off instead of refusing to play which would effect the support for their actions. Players for South Africa included Graeme Pollock (captain), Mike Procter, Vincent van der Bijl, Peter Pollock, Hylton Ackerman, Denis Lindsay, Graham Chevalier, Arthur Short and Andre Bruyns. Players for Transvaal included Barry Richards (guest player), Brian Bath, Clive Rice, Peter Carlstien and Don Mackay-Coghill (captain). Ali Bacher did not play because he was making up hours at the Baragwanath Hospital for time taken for cricket. Bacher’s South African team had beaten Australia 4—0 in their 1969/70 Test series.

In another attempt to receive a touring international side to visit, the South African Cricket Association invited New Zealand to play three matches against multiracial sides when they were en route to England. However, New Zealand declined the offer.

== DH Robins' XI January-February 1973 ==
A women's Test team from New Zealand did visit South Africa at the start of 1972. In addition, Rhodesia, a country neighbouring South Africa that was also under White minority rule, attracted an International Wanderers side captained by England star Brian Close and that included nine Test players, one of whom was Basil D'Oliveira. They played just two games: a drawn game on 23-25 September 1972 and a 4-day match on 29 September-2 October 1972, which Rhodesia won easily by 411 runs, and did not tour South Africa. South African, Mike Procter, played for Rhodesia.

However the first "international" games played by South Africa post-isolation occurred after this. Derrick Robins, a millionaire businessman and chairman of Coventry City Football Club, had organised a number of private cricket tours in the past, arranged a tour to South Africa that took place between 1 January and 6 February 1973. His XI included many England Test players, who – unlike the 1981/2 South African tourists like Gooch and Underwood – did not suffer bans as a result of touring. Robins' aim was for his XI "to do so well that you will invite us back again". His players were also aware that England's Test selectors would notice how they performed.

There was some criticism of his decision to come to apartheid South Africa, which Robins dismissed by saying, "I do not want to answer political questions, but I'll say this: we are a team of English cricketers on a private tour, here to play anyone our hosts want us to play against." However, an attempt to mobilise opposition in England soon fizzled out.

The highlight of the tour was a 4-day game against a representative South African XI, the closest South Africa had come to choosing a Test squad since 1970. This game was changed to be the last one – highlighting that the tourists were treating their games seriously, rather than as a cricketing holiday. All the leading South African cricketers played, including many who had played Test matches before South Africa's expulsion from the world cricket community.

In this game DH Robins' XI won the toss and chose to field: that was a mistake as, courtesy of 100 runs from Barry Richards and 97 for Andre Bruyns, they piled on 387 runs. A strong all-round bowling performance saw DH Robins' XI get dismissed twice for under 160, with no player scoring more than 32, and the match end within 3 days. A 50 overs a side game was played on what would have been the fourth day. A tight match saw the South Africans edge home by one wicket.

DH Robins' XI team squad comprised: Tony Brown; David Brown; Frank Hayes; Jackie Hampshire; Robin Hobbs; David Hughes; Robin Jackman; Roger Knight; John Lever; Peter Lewington; Arnold Long; John Murray; Clive Radley; Mike Smith; David Turner; Peter Willey; Bob Willis;

South African International XI (effectively a South African representative team) comprised: Ali Bacher (captain); Eddie Barlow; Andre Bruyns; Jackie du Preez; Lee Irvine; Donald Mackay-Coghill; Ken McEwan; Mike Procter; Barry Richards; Peter Swart. Additionally, Vintcent van der Bijl played in the one-day match, but not the 4-day match; Rupert Hanley played in the 4-day match, but not the one-day match.

Date	Result	Venue	Scheduled length
1,2,3 Jan	DH Robins' XI (306-4d & 135) lost to Eastern Province (218 & 224-4) by 6 wkts	St George's Park, Port Elizabeth	3 days
5,6,8 Jan	Western Province (371-2d & 175-2d) beat DH Robins' XI (234 & 191) by 121 runs	Newlands, Cape Town	3 days
12,13,15 Jan	DH Robins' XI (344-9d & 199-4d) drew with Transvaal (275-6d & 188-8)	New Wanderers, Johannesburg	3 days
19,20,22 Jan	Natal (180-8d & 227-8d) lost to DH Robins' XI (250-9d & 160-6) by 4 wkts	Kingsmead, Durban	3 days
26,27,29 Jan	DH Robins' XI (237 & 200-5d) drew with Combined Section B XI (208-8d & 85-4)	Berea Park, Pretoria	3 days
2,3,5 Feb	Invitation Section A XI (387-9d) beat DH Robins' XI (118 & 152) by an innings and 117 runs	New Wanderers, Johannesburg	4 days
6 Feb	DH Robins' XI (146) lost to South African Invitation XI (147-9) by 1 wkt	New Wanderers, Johannesburg	50 overs

== DH Robins' XI October-December 1973 ==
At the start of the next South African season, Derrick Robins took another group of tourists to South Africa. Only Mike Smith and John Lever of those who toured earlier in 1973 went on this tour. Whilst the other players on the team were mostly English, there were also a number of players from other countries. Most notably the tour included Pakistani Younis Ahmed and West Indian John Shepherd. The other players in the touring squad were (English unless stated otherwise):

- Brian Close (captain); Ray East; John Edrich; Bruce Francis (Australian); John Gleeson (Australian); Graham Johnson; Peter Lee; Graham Roope; John Snow; Roger Tolchard; Bob Woolmer

After four warm-up games against the provinces, the tour included five games against fully representative South African sides, four of which were over 4 days, the other a one-day match over 50 overs. The one-day game was against an African XI in Soweto.

The South Africans who played in each of these representative squads were: Hylton Ackerman; Eddie Barlow (captain); Dassie Biggs; Lee Irvine; Graeme Pollock; Mike Procter; Barry Richards; Vintcent van der Bijl. Additionally, Peter Swart played in the 4-day games, but not the one-day game; Jackie du Preez and Anthony Smith just played in the first two 4-day games; Pelham Henwood and Rupert Hanley played in the third 4-day game and the one-day game; and Kevin Verdoorn only played in the one-day game.

The first of the representative games contained little of note, with slow scoring (South Africa's second innings of 287 took 112 overs) meant that it ended in a draw. The second game was dominated by two huge scores. John Edrich made 170 for DH Robins' XI, then Barry Richards made 180 for South Africa to ensure a second draw. The third and final first-class representative game started with South Africa winning the toss and putting DH Robins' XI into bat. DH Robins' XI only made 227 for 9 declared. The South African innings was dominated by 211 from Eddie Barlow and 125 from Lee Irvine as they piled on 528, with John Lever taking 6 for 117. A strong performance of 4 for 66 from Vintcent van der Bijl then helped South Africa dismiss DH Robins' XI for 218 to record a strong win in the match, and to take the three-match series 1-0.

The next day DH Robins' XI had their revenge in the only one-day game of the tour in a low scoring, but tight match.

Date	Result	Venue	Scheduled length
26,27,29 Oct	Western Province (286-4d & 149-5) drew with DH Robins' XI (375-4d)	Newlands, Cape Town	3 days
2,3,5 Nov)	DH Robins' XI (222-8d & 98-2d) drew with Natal (134-7d & 32-0)	Kingsmead, Durban	3 days
9,10,12 Nov	Transvaal (217-9d & 199) lost to DH Robins' XI (303-6d & 116-2) by 8 wkts	New Wanderers, Johannesburg	3 days
16,17,19 Nov	Eastern Province (123 & 206) lost to DH Robins' XI (261 & 69-2) by 8 wkts	St George's Park, Port Elizabeth	3 days
23,24,26,27 Nov	South African Invitation XI (278 & 287) drew with DH Robins' XI (329 & 142-5)	Newlands, Cape Town	4 days
30 Nov, 1,3,4 Dec	DH Robins' XI (383-9d & 39-0) drew with South African Invitation XI (454)	Kingsmead, Durban	4 days
7,8,10,11 Dec	DH Robins' XI (227-9d & 218) lost to South African Invitation XI (528-8d)	New Wanderers, Johannesburg	4 days
12 Dec	DH Robins' XI (201-9) beat South African Invitation XI (198)	New Wanderers, Johannesburg	50 overs

== DH Robins' XI March-April 1975 ==
Brian Close led a strong international team known as the "International Wanderers" to Rhodesia in September 1974. They played one game against Transvaal, but nothing else in South Africa. The Rhodesian team notably included South African-born Mike Procter, whilst the International Wanderers counted South African Eddie Barlow amongst their numbers. In the game against Transvaal in Johannesburg the international International Wanderers notably fielded two non-white players in their team, Barbadian John Shepherd and Pakistani Younis Ahmed. The three day match resulted in the International Wanderers beating Transvaal by 183 runs.

An Australian test team was scheduled to tour South Africa for the 1975-76 season. The tour was called off "with reluctance" according to Tim Caldwell, the chairman of the Australian Cricket Board. Australian Prime Minister Gough Whitlam stated that if Australia were to send a team to South Africa, it was likely that Australian sides would not be received in the Caribbean or Indian subcontinent and that teams from these countries may no longer visit Australia.

The next games for a representative South African side therefore took place on Derrick Robins third tour to South Africa in March and April 1975. This DH Robins' XI was again an international side. Captained once again by Brian Close, it included the following players from Robins' preceding tour: Bruce Francis (Australian), John Shepherd (West Indian), Roger Tolchard, Younis Ahmed (Pakistani). In addition, the following also toured: Malcolm Francke (Sri Lanka/Australia), Geoff Greenidge (West Indies), Tony Greig (South African-born England player), Jackie Hampshire, Frank Hayes, Eddie Hemmings, Terry Jenner (Australia), John Lyon, Clive Radley, Stephen Rouse, John Steele, Stuart Turner, Max Walker (Australia).

The South African Board President's XI was again captained by Eddie Barlow. It also, for the very first time in a South African representative match, included two black players. Edward Habane played in both the first-class match (the only one he ever played) and the one-dayer. Sedick Conrad played only in the first-class match. The other players were: Darryl Bestall, Simon Bezuidenhout, Rupert Hanley, Pelham Henwood, Lee Irvine, Graeme Pollock, Barry Richards, Vintcent van der Bijl. Also Peter Swart played in the one-day match, but not the first-class match.

The first-class match featuring the South African Board President's XI was dominated by an innings of 155 by South African legend, Eddie Barlow. DH Robins' XI was skittled out thanks to hauls of 5 for 41 from Pelham Henwood in the first innings, and 5 for 44 from Vintcent van der Bijl to leave the South Africans winners by 260 runs. More remarkable than the scores, however, was the inclusion of Edward Habane and Sedick Conrad, both black, in the South African squad. This was the first time coloured South Africans had played first-class cricket against a touring side since a South African Malays team played an English touring side in the 1890s.

The 40 over representative match was a low-scoring affair, with Barry Richards' 68 helping South Africa to a 5 wicket win with 6 balls to spare.

Date	Result	Venue	Scheduled length
1,2,3 Mar	Natal (257 & 172-7d) drew with DH Robins' XI (164 & 220-6)	Kingsmead, Durban	3 days
7,8,10 Mar	DH Robins' XI (232-6d & 280-7d) lost to Eastern Province (254-6d & 260-5) by 5 wkts	St George's Park, Port Elizabeth	3 days
14,15,17 Mar	DH Robins' XI (309-3d & 210-8d) drew with Transvaal (283-7d & 149-2)	New Wanderers, Johannesburg	3 days
21,22,24,25 Mar	Western Province (231 & 206) drew with DH Robins' XI (295-6d & 99-5)	Newlands, Cape Town	3 days
28,29,31 Mar	South African Board President's XI (371 & 265-4) beat DH Robins' XI (183 & 193) by 260 runs	Newlands, Cape Town	3 days
1 Apr	DH Robins' XI (160) lost to South African Board President's XI (162-5) by 5 wkts	Newlands, Cape Town	40 overs

== DH Robins' XI January-February 1976 ==
The International Wanderers made a three game tour to Rhodesia in September and October 1975, but other than that there was no international cricket in Southern Africa until a tour by another DH Robins' XI in January and February 1976. However, only one game of this tour, a 60 over affair, was played against a representative South African XI as the main games for South Africa would come slightly later in the season against another International Wanderers team.

The members of touring party were (England unless stated): Phil Carrick, Trevor Chappell (Australia), Geoff Cope, John Douglas (Australia), Frank Hayes, Mike Hendrick, Geoff Howarth (New Zealand), Andrew Kennedy, Peter Lee, David Lloyd (captain), Derek Randall, Phil Slocombe, David Steele, Fred Titmus, Roger Tolchard, Gary Troup (New Zealand), Dav Whatmore (Australia).

The South African Invitation XI was again captained by Eddie Barlow. It also included one black cricketer, Samson Sonwabe. The other players were David Dyer, Rupert Hanley, Denys Hobson, Lee Irvine, Graeme Pollock, Clive Rice, Barry Richards, Anthony Smith and Vintcent van der Bijl.

The representative match was low and slow scoring, with South Africa making 219-7 in their 60 overs. The highlights were half centuries from Dyer, Pollock and Richards and 4 for 28 from Troup. DH Robins' XI struggled in reply, collapsing from 125-3 to 164 all out with no player reaching his half century.

Date	Result	Venue	Scheduled length
17,18,19 Jan	Natal (249 & 151) beat DH Robins' XI (237-4d & 161) by 2 runs	Kingsmead, Durban	3 days
23,24,26 Jan	Western Province (262-8d & 151-7d) beat DH Robins' XI (144 & 191) by 78 runs	Newlands, Cape Town	3 days
28 Jan	South African Invitation XI (219-7) beat DH Robins' XI (164) by 55 runs	Newlands, Cape Town	60 overs
30,31 Jan, 2 Feb	DH Robins' XI (298-5d & 142-4d) beat Transvaal (195-8d & 137) by 108 runs	New Wanderers, Johannesburg	3 days
6,7 Feb	Eastern Province (68 & 157) lost to DH Robins' XI (155-9d & 71-0) by 10 wkts	St George's Park, Port Elizabeth	3 days

== International Wanderers March-April 1976 ==
The highlight of the South African 1975/6 season was a tour by the International Wanderers. They played 3 first-class games and 1 one-day game against a South African Invitation XI. They also played a first-class game against a weaker South African Board President's XI. This was the strongest team to tour South Africa since isolation, and comprised players from 4 countries. The tourists were managed by Richie Benaud and captained by Australian Greg Chappell in all four main representative games. Englishmen Mike Denness and Bob Taylor, and West Indian John Shepherd also played in all four games. The other players, their nationalities and the games they played in are as follows (numbers relate to the first-class games, OD relates to the one-day game): Ian Chappell (Australia) 1, OD; Phil Edmonds (Zambian-born Englishman) OD, 3; Gary Gilmour (Australia) 1, 2, 3; Alan Hurst (Australia) 1, 3; Martin Kent (Australia) 1, 2, 3; Dennis Lillee (Australia) 2, 3; Ashley Mallett (Australia) 1, OD, 2; John Morrison (New Zealand) 1, OD, 2; Glenn Turner (New Zealand) OD, 2, 3; Derek Underwood (England) 1, OD, 3; Max Walker (Australia) OD, 2.

The South African Invitation XI was again captained by Eddie Barlow, who played in all four representative games, as did Clive Rice and Vintcent van der Bijl. A number of coloured players were selected for the Invitation XI. These, and the games they played in, were Abdullatief Barnes 1, 2; Winston Carelse 1, 2; Ismail Ebrahim 3; Devdas Govindjee OD; D Jacobs OD; Farouk Timol 3.

The other players selected for South Africa were Hylton Ackerman OD; Howard Bergins 1, 2, 3; Henry Fotheringham 1; Jack Heron 1; Denys Hobson 1; Lee Irvine OD, 2, 3; Peter Kirsten 1; Douglas Neilson OD; Gavin Pfuhl 1; Graeme Pollock OD, 2, 3; Anthony Smith OD, 2, 3; Barry Richards OD, 2, 3; Lorrie Wilmot 2, 3.

Date	Result	Venue	Scheduled length
18,19,20,22 Mar	International Wanderers (220 & 324) beat South African Invitation XI (290 & 69) by 185 runs	Newlands, Cape Town	4 days
24 Mar	South African Invitation XI (176-6) lost to International Wanderers (177-5) by 5 wkts	St George's Park, Port Elizabeth	50 overs
26,27,28 Mar	South African Board President's XI (321 & 182) drew with International Wanderers (241-5d & 210-9)	St George's Park, Port Elizabeth	3 days
2,3,5,6,7 Apr	International Wanderers (134 & 466) drew with South African Invitation XI (324 & 91-8)	New Wanderers, Johannesburg	4 days
8,9,10,12 Apr	South African Invitation XI (178 & 269) beat International Wanderers (99 & 226)	Kingsmead, Durban	4 days

== The end of international tours ==
During the early to mid-1970s there had been various attempts by the different South African cricket bodies representing the whites, coloureds and black to play multiracial cricket despite Government opposition. In June 1976, however, there were major political uprisings in South Africa. The main outbreak of civil strife was the Soweto Uprising, centred on Soweto, the black township attached to Johannesburg. On 16 June, thousands of schoolchildren rebelled against the education policy of the white minority government. Hundreds were killed; US newspaper Newsday estimated 332 had died in Soweto and 435 nationally. Many others went into exile.

On 17 July 1976 the Montréal Olympics opened without 25 African countries (later joined by 4 others) who were boycotting the games as a result of New Zealand retaining sporting ties with South Africa – the New Zealand rugby union team were touring South Africa at the time.

In the light of this political strife, new changes were proposed, which included the placing of a moratorium on tours to and from South Africa. In practice no international tour happened until the first of the South African rebel tours in 1982.
