= International Wanderers in South Africa in 1975-76 =

An International Wanderers team, made up of international players from multiple countries, toured South Africa in 1976. They played four matches against the South African Invitation XI team and four other exhibition matches against local teams.

== Squad ==
The following players played one or more matches for the International Wanderers:

Player	Date of birth	Batting style	Bowling style	Country
Mike Denness	1 December 1940	Right hand	Right arm offbreak	England
Phil Edmonds	8 March 1951	Right hand	Slow left-arm orthodox	England
Greg Chappell (c)	7 August 1948	Right hand	Right arm medium	Australia
Ian Chappell	26 September 1943	Right hand	Right arm legbreak	Australia
Gary Gilmour	26 June 1951	Left hand	Left arm fast-medium	Australia
Alan Hurst	15 July 1950	Right hand	Right arm fast	Australia
Martin Kent	23 November 1953	Right hand	-	Australia
Dennis Lillee	18 July 1949	Right hand	Right arm fast	Australia
Ashley Mallett	13 July 1945	Right hand	Right arm offbreak	Australia
John Morrison	27 August 1947	Right hand	Slow left-arm orthodox	New Zealand
John Shepherd	9 November 1943	Right hand	Right arm medium	Barbados
Bob Taylor	17 July 1941	Right hand	Wicket-keeper	England
Glenn Turner	26 May 1947	Right hand	Right arm offbreak	New Zealand
Derek Underwood	8 June 1945	Right hand	Slow left-arm orthodox	England
Max Walker	12 September 1948	Right hand	Right arm fast-medium	Australia

== Tour matches ==
12 March 1976
(1-day single innings match)
Scorecard

International Wanderers; 331/7d (62 overs)	v	South Africa African XI; 47 (31.3 overs)
John Morrison 74; Edmund Ntikinca 5/62 (12 overs)		Stanford Somyo 9 Derek Underwood 3/6 (10 overs)

International Wanderers won by 284 runs
Soweto Cricket Oval, Soweto

- South Africa African XI won the toss and decided to field

13 March 1976
(1-day single innings match)
Scorecard

International Wanderers; 247 (55.2 overs)	v	Multi-Racial XI; 173/4 (54 overs)
Ian Chappell 88; Rodney Ontong 7/83 (19.2 overs)		Kepler Wessels 56; Greg Chappell 1/4 (1 over)

Match drawn
Berea Park, Pretoria

- Toss not known

18-22 March 1976
(4-day match)
Scorecard

International Wanderers	v	South African Invitation XI
220 (82.4 overs); Mike Denness 81; Abdullatief Barnes 2/8 (3.4 overs)		290 (89.3 overs); Clive Rice 97; Alan Hurst 5/57 (20 overs)
324 (94.3 overs); Gary Gilmour 80*; Howard Bergins 3/44 (11.3 overs)		69 (35.4 overs); Henry Fotheringham 21; Ashley Mallett 4/24 (9.4 overs)

International Wanderers won by 185 runs
Newlands, Cape Town
Umpires: Herbert Martin and Ossie Schoof

- Toss not known

24 March 1976
(50-over match)
Scorecard

South African Invitation XI; 176/6 (50 overs)	v	International Wanderers; 177/5 (41.5 overs)
Barry Richards 67; Ashley Mallett 3/53 (10 overs)		Greg Chappell 54; Douglas Neilson 2/28 (8.5 overs)

International Wanderers won by 5 wickets
St George's Park, Port Elizabeth

- Toss not known

26-29 March 1976
(3-day match)
Scorecard

South African Board President's XI	v	International Wanderers
321 (111.5 overs); Lorrie Wilmot 117; Ashley Mallett 3/45 (15 overs)		245/d (63.1 overs); Martin Kent* 67; Rupert Hanley 3/57 (17 overs)
182 (79 overs); Kepler Wessels 88*; Derek Underwood 3/11 (9 overs)		210/9 (47 overs); Martin Kent 54; Rodney Ontong 6/52 (15 overs)

Match drawn
Umpires: Dudley Schoof and Carl Coetzee

- Toss not known

2-7 April 1976
(4-day match)
Scorecard

South African Invitation XI	v	International Wanderers
134 (43 overs); Gary Gilmour 32*; Clive Rice 4/36 (13 overs)		324 (85.5 overs); Graeme Pollock 124; Ashley Mallett 3/47 (12.5 overs)
466 (147.4 overs); Martin Kent 155; Vintcent van der Bijl 4/87 (42 overs)		91/8 (36 overs); Lee Irvine 31; Dennis Lillee 7/27 (14 overs)

Match drawn
Wanderers Stadium, Johannesburg
Umpires: Denzil Bezuidenhout and Sydney Moore

- International Wanderers won the toss and decided to bat
- It was agreed to extend the match into a fifth day after rain prevented play on the second day

8-12 April 1976
(4-day match)
Scorecard

South African Invitation XI	v	International Wanderers
178 (50.4 overs); Tony Smith 52; Dennis Lillee 4/42 (12.4 overs)		99 (39.2 overs); Greg Chappell 28; Vintcent van der Bijl 4/20 (13.2 overs)
269 (82.2 overs); Barry Richards 80; Dennis Lillee 4/47 (20 overs)		226 (84.1 overs); Mike Denness 84; Ismail Ebrahim 6/66 (29.1 overs)

South African Invitation XI won by 122 runs
Kingsmead, Durban
Umpires: Denzil Bezuidenhout and Dudley Schoof

- Toss not known
