= England XI in South Africa in 1981–82 =

International cricket tour

	South Africa	England XI
- Dates: 3 March 1982 – 29 March 1982
Captains	Mike Procter	Graham Gooch

Test series
- Result: South Africa won the 3-match series 1–0
Most runs	Peter Kirsten (247)	Graham Gooch (338)
Most wickets	Vintcent van der Bijl (18)	Les Taylor (11)

One Day International series
- Results: South Africa won the 3-match series 3–0
Most runs	Jimmy Cook (179)	Graham Gooch (162)
Most wickets	Vintcent van der Bijl (7)	Arnold Sidebottom (4)

In March 1982, a representative team of English cricket players undertook what came to be known as the first "Rebel tour" to South Africa, to play a series of matches against the South African team. At the time, the International Cricket Conference had placed a moratorium on international cricket teams undertaking tours of the country, due to the South African government's policy of apartheid, leaving South Africa with no international competition.

== Background ==
In 1970, following international criticism of the fact that major international sporting teams had continued to travel to play in South Africa, despite the government's apartheid policies that institutionalised segregation in the country, the International Cricket Conference (ICC) elected to ban South Africa from international competition, meaning that the South African team was no longer allowed to play international cricket overseas, and other international sides were not permitted to undertake tours to South Africa.

During the 1970s, despite the ban, international cricket to some degree was played in South Africa, largely thanks to the efforts of sports promoter D.H. Robins, who organised four private tours to the country, each time selecting a strong international group of players to take part. Because these were private tours, there was no sanction against the participants from the ICC. Nevertheless, there was significant criticism that they were taking place, in addition to other more official tours in other sports – two months after the end of the 1976 D.H. Robins tour, the New Zealand rugby union team undertook an official tour to South Africa, which included four international matches against the Springboks, which led to 25 African nations boycotting the 1976 Summer Olympics. As a result, it was agreed among the governing bodies of a number of sports to introduce a moratorium on all international touring of South Africa.

Despite the efforts of the cricket authorities in South Africa to try and normalise participation in the game, which included the formation of the South African Cricket Union (SACU) in 1976, intended to administer the game on multiracial grounds, rather than the multiple bodies governing cricket for whites, blacks and coloureds, a powerful bloc in the ICC, which included India, Pakistan and the West Indies, refused to consider the re-admission of South Africa until apartheid was ended. As a result, by the start of the 1980s, cricket in the country had been damaged by a decade of isolation, with the quality of the play low, and both attendances and participation falling, at a time when internationally the game was experiencing a renaissance, with the introduction of the Cricket World Cup in 1975, and the improvement of it as a television spectacle thanks to World Series Cricket. As a result, Ali Bacher, a senior administrator in the SACU, having been told explicitly that South Africa would not be permitted to return to the international fold while apartheid was in force, proposed to see the return of international cricket to South Africa by other means, in the form of inducing international players to undertake separate tours, in defiance of the ban. Because the players would potentially endanger their careers by touring, the financial package offered to each would need to be substantial. The first such tour was organised for the 1981–82 international season, and would feature a selection of English players.

=== Planning ===
The prospect of a tour to South Africa was first raised among the England team during the 1980-81 tour of the West Indies, when a number of players, including David Gower, Ian Botham, John Emburey, Geoffrey Boycott and Graham Gooch, all expressed an interest in making such a trip. At the end of the 1981 season, the Test and County Cricket Board (TCCB) learned that one of the England selectors, John Edrich, was planning a small scale tour, which was called off when warnings were issued that anyone on such a venture would be punished.

The turning point came during the 1981-82 tour to India, which included a long, six test series that a number of players found tedious. Although some players, most notably Botham and Gower, elected to withdraw from any proposed trip, largely due to financial considerations, others, such as Gooch, expressed a keen interest in going. Gooch said that at the time he felt bored during the tour of India, and saw a trip to South Africa, in addition to being lucrative, as a way to invigorate his game. The tour was originally to be financed by Holiday Inns, who made their support conditional on Botham being part of the touring party. When he pulled out, it was left to South African Breweries to underwrite the cost, leading to the touring side being named as the "South African Breweries England XI". The England team returned from India on 24 February 1982, and, during the next three days, contracts with players for the tour were signed. News of the tour eventually became public when seven of the players flew to Johannesburg on 1 March.

== Squads ==
South Africa	(England) English XI
Mike Procter (c); Ray Jennings (wk); Jimmy Cook; Barry Richards; Peter Kirsten; Graeme Pollock; Clive Rice; Adrian Kuiper; Alan Kourie; Garth Le Roux; Vintcent van der Bijl; Kenny Watson; Denys Hobson; Stephen Jefferies	Graham Gooch (c); Alan Knott (wk); Dennis Amiss; Geoffrey Boycott; John Emburey; Mike Hendrick; Geoff Humpage; Wayne Larkins; John Lever; Chris Old; Arnold Sidebottom; Les Taylor; Derek Underwood; Peter Willey; Bob Woolmer

In 1982, South Africa, despite more than a decade of isolation, boasted a generation of players regarded as among the best in the world. Many of these players were selected by the SACU to play in the planned series against the English XI. By contrast, the players selected for the touring side, despite being proclaimed as virtually a full-strength England side with only Ian Botham missing by the press in South Africa, was far from being as strong as indicated. With the exception of Graham Gooch and John Emburey, the majority of the selection were either players at the tail-end of their international careers, or players that had been on the margins of the England team. Indeed, three of the English players, Les Taylor, Arnold Sidebottom and Geoff Humpage, had not at that time played a Test match.

== Matches ==
The tour was scheduled to last for four weeks, with a three match "Test" series and three "One-Day Internationals", plus another two games, against South African Colts and Western Province.

=== Tour matches ===
==== South African Colts XI v South African Breweries England XI ====
3 – 4 March 1982
Scorecard

England XI	v	(South Africa) South African Colts XI
152/7 d (66.2 overs); GA Gooch 33; AP Kuiper 5/22 (8 overs)		170/8 d (66.4 overs); BJ Whitfield 37; LB Taylor 2/20 (13 overs); DL Underwood 2/35 (15 overs); GA Gooch 2/29 (4.4 overs)
32/2 (14 overs); GA Gooch 11; G Boycott 11; NV Radford 2/14 (7 overs)

Match drawn
Berea Park, Pretoria
Umpires: George Hawkins (SA) and Barry Smith (SA)

- England XI won the toss and elected to bat

==== Western Province v South African Breweries England XI ====
8 – 10 March 1982
Scorecard

Western Province	v	England XI
263/8 d (78 overs); AP Kuiper 90; JE Emburey 4/88 (26 overs)		219 (71.1 overs); GA Gooch 58; DL Hobson 4/57 (21.1 overs)
204/7 d (67 overs); PN Kirsten 67*; CM Old 2/26 (11 overs); GA Gooch 2/45 (14 overs); JE Emburey 2/65 (21.5 overs)		225/8 (73 overs); G Boycott 95; RF Pienaar 2/41 (16 overs); DL Hobson 2/48 (21 overs); O Henry 2/61 (11 overs)

Match drawn
Newlands, Cape Town
Umpires: Dudley Schoof (SA) and Albert Maasch (SA)

- Western Province won the toss and elected to bat

=== Test series ===
==== First Test ====
12 – 15 March 1982
Scorecard

South Africa	v	England XI
400/7 d (116 overs); SJ Cook 114; LB Taylor 3/73 (31 overs)		150 (63 overs); DL Amiss 66*; VAP van der Bijl 5/25 (22 overs)
37/2 (11.4 overs); PN Kirsten 20*; CM Old 1/8 (6 overs); JK Lever 1/27 (5.4 overs)		283 (103.2 overs) (f/o); GA Gooch 109; VAP van der Bijl 5/79 (32 overs)

South Africa won by eight wickets
Wanderers, Johannesburg
Umpires: Perry Hurwitz (SA) and Barry Smith (SA)

- South Africa won the toss and elected to bat

==== Second Test ====
19 – 22 March 1982
Scorecard

England XI	v	South Africa
223 (102.4 overs); GA Gooch 83; AJ Kourie 4/52 (32 overs)		235 (108 overs); PN Kirsten 114; JK Lever 6/86 (37 overs)
249/3 d (93 overs); W Larkins 95; ST Jefferies 1/39 (14 overs); DL Hobson 1/86 (30 overs); PN Kirsten 1/7 (4 overs)		38/0 (7 overs); RV Jennings 28*

Match drawn
Newlands, Cape Town
Umpires: Barry Smith (SA) and Oswald Schoof (SA)

- England XI won the toss and elected to bat

==== Third Test ====
26 – 29 March 1982
Scorecard

South Africa	v	England XI
181/9 d (70.3 overs); AJ Kourie 50*; LB Taylor 5/61 (25.3 overs)		311/8 d (111.2 overs); RA Woolmer 100; VAP van der Bijl 5/97 (40 overs)
143/2 (48 overs); SJ Cook 50*; JK Lever 1/25 (16 overs); W Larkins 1/24 (5 overs)

Match drawn
Kingsmead, Durban
Umpires: Dudley Schoof (SA) and Oswald Schook (SA)

- England XI won the toss and elected to field

=== One-day Series ===
==== First ODI ====
6 March 1982
Scorecard

England XI; 240/5 (50 overs)	v	South Africa; 244/3 (47.2 overs)
GA Gooch 114; MJ Procter 2/20 (10 overs)		SJ Cook 82; GA Gooch 1/27 (8 overs); CM Old 1/48 (9 overs); DL Underwood 1/40 (10 overs)

South Africa won by seven wickets
St George's Park, Port Elizabeth
Umpires: Perry Hurwitz (SA) and Oswald Schoof (SA)

- South Africa won the toss and elected to field

==== Second ODI ====
17 March 1982
Scorecard

South Africa; 231/6 (50 overs)	v	England XI; 152 (43.2 overs)
SJ Cook 35; JK Lever 2/49 (10 overs)		W Larkins 47; VAP van der Bijl 3/19 (7 overs)

South Africa won by 79 runs
Kingsmead, Durban
Umpires: Denzil Bezuidenhout (SA) and Desmond Sansom (SA)

- England XI won the toss and elected to field

==== Third ODI ====
24 March 1982
Scorecard

South Africa; 243/5 (50 overs)	v	England XI; 111/7 (23 overs)
SJ Cook 62; A Sidebottom 3/35 (10 overs)		GA Gooch 38; VAP van der Bijl 3/30 (9 overs)

South Africa won on faster scoring rate
Wanderers, Johannesburg
Umpires: Sydney Moore (SA) and Arthur Norton (SA)

- South Africa won the toss and elected to bat
- England XI set revised target of 112 from 23 overs following rain delay

== Aftermath ==
The tour was hailed as a major success by South Africa's ruling National Party, with B.J. Vorster, the former Prime Minister, and a staunch supporter of apartheid, claiming it as a "triumph for common sense". However, the tour was fundamentally both a commercial and cricketing failure as, despite sums of between £40,000 and £60,000 per man being paid, the quality of the English players selected for the tour was poor. Upon their return from South Africa, the touring players each received three-year international bans from the TCCB, effectively ending the international careers of a number of them. Of the fifteen players that made the trip, only two, Graham Gooch and John Emburey, returned from their bans to play any major part with the England team.

Over the course of the 1980s, another six rebel tours were undertaken to South Africa by players from different Test-playing nations, with the last undertaken in the 1989–90 season by another England representative side.
