= South African cricket team in Australia in 1971–72 (proposed) =

	Australia	South Africa
- Dates: October 1971 – February 1972
Captains	Ian Chappell	Ali Bacher

Test series

The South African national cricket team was meant to tour Australia over the 1971–72 Australian summer, but was ultimately called off.

== Tour details ==
The tour was arranged to occur between mid-October 1971 to mid-February 1972. The itinerary for the tour was understood to include six test matches. Two were to be in Melbourne and one each in Brisbane, Sydney, Adelaide and Perth.

== Touring squad ==
South Africa's selected squad was:

Player	Date of birth	Batting style	Bowling style	First-class team
Ali Bacher (c)	24 May 1942	Right-handed	Leg break	Transvaal
Eddie Barlow (vc)	12 August 1940	Right-handed	Right-arm medium	Western Province
Hylton Ackerman	28 April 1947	Left-handed	Right-arm medium	Western Province
Dassie Biggs	26 April 1946	Right-handed	Right-arm off-spin	Eastern Province
Vince van der Bijl	19 March 1949	Right-handed	Right-arm fast-medium	Natal
Grahame Chevalier	9 March 1937	Right-handed	Slow left-arm orthodox	Western Province
Peter de Vaal	3 December 1945	Left-handed	Slow left-arm orthodox	Transvaal
Lee Irvine	9 March 1944	Left-handed	Wicketkeeper	Natal
Denis Lindsay	4 September 1939	Right-handed	Wicketkeeper	Northern Transvaal
Graeme Pollock	27 February 1944	Left-handed	Leg break	Eastern Province
Peter Pollock	30 June 1941	Right-handed	Right-arm fast	Eastern Province
Mike Procter	15 September 1946	Right-handed	Right-arm fast	Rhodesia
Clive Rice	23 July 1949	Right-handed	Right-arm fast medium	Transvaal
Barry Richards	21 July 1945	Right-handed	Right arm off break	Natal
Pat Trimborn	18 May 1940	Right-handed	Right-arm fast-medium	Natal

Barlow subsequently withdrew for business reasons and was replaced by Arthur Short.

== Outcome ==
However, the tour was cancelled after protests from the anti-apartheid movement; in making this decision, the Australian Cricket Board had been influenced by the protests that accompanied the 1971 South Africa rugby union tour of Australia.

The tour was replaced by a tour from a Rest of the World XI, which included Hylton Ackerman, Graeme Pollock and Peter Pollock. The Australian Cricket Board of Control chairman, Sir Donald Bradman, stated the invitation of players from South Africa was based on the precedent set from the replacement tour of England in 1970 after the proposed South African tour was cancelled. He also said that the next Australian tour of South Africa was scheduled for the 1975–76 season.

As a result of the tour's cancellation, South Africa's exclusion from international cricket was formalised. South Africa would not tour Australia again until the 1992 Cricket World Cup, and would not make another full tour until 1993-94.
