= Gary Watson (cricketer) =

South African cricketer

Personal information
- Full name: Gary Lancelot George Watson
- Born: 3 October 1944 (age 82); Durban, Natal, South Africa
- Batting: Right-handed
- Bowling: Right-arm fast

Domestic team information
- Years: Team
- 1964–65 to 1975–76: Transvaal

Career statistics
Competition	First-class	List A
Matches	37	5
Runs scored	829	57
Batting average	21.25	19.00
100s/50s	0/4	0/0
Top score	83	19
Balls bowled	5612	222
Wickets	100	3
Bowling average	26.49	38.00
5 wickets in innings	2	0
10 wickets in match	0	0
Best bowling	5/36	3/26
Catches/stumpings	28/–	0/–
- Source: Cricinfo, 22 April 2015

Gary Lancelot George Watson (born 3 October 1944) is a former South African cricketer who played first-class cricket in South Africa from 1964 to 1976.

== Cricket career ==
Watson was a fast bowler and useful tail-end batsman. He made his first-class debut for Transvaal in 1964–65, and alternated between the Transvaal and Transvaal B teams until 1967–68, when he became a permanent member of the Transvaal team.

In 1968–69, when Transvaal won the Currie Cup, he took 14 wickets at an average of 27.57. He also scored 200 runs at an average of 33.33, with his highest score of 83 against Eastern Province when, batting at number 10, he added 166 for ninth wicket with Robbie Muzzell.

Watson took 20 wickets at 16.40 in 1969–70 when Transvaal finished equal first in the Currie Cup. Against Eastern Province he took 5 for 41, all of his victims caught behind by Lee Irvine. He was selected in the 14-man South African team to tour England in 1970, but the tour was cancelled owing to anti-apartheid protests. He was chosen as one of the South African Cricket Annual Cricketers of the Year in 1970.

Watson played less regularly in the 1970s, but took his best figures, 5 for 36, for Transvaal B against Border in 1975–76.
