= International Wanderers in Rhodesia in 1972–73 =

An International Wanderers team, made up of players from England, Australia and New Zealand, toured Rhodesia in 1972. They played two first-class matches against the Rhodesia cricket team.

== Squad ==
The following players played one or more matches for the International Wanderers

Player	Date of Birth	Batting style	Bowling style	Country
Brian Close	24 February 1931	Left hand	Right arm offbreak	England
Basil D'Oliveira	4 October 1931	Right hand	Right arm medium	England
John Edrich	21 June 1937	Left hand	Right arm medium	England
Bruce Francis	18 February 1948	Right hand	Right arm medium	Australia
Norman Gifford	30 March 1940	Left hand	Slow left-arm orthodox	England
David Green	10 November 1939	Right hand	Right arm medium	England
Tony Greig	6 October 1946	Right hand	Right arm medium	England
John Jameson	30 June 1941	Right hand	Right arm medium	England
Mervyn Kitchen	1 August 1940	Left hand	Right arm medium	England
Graham McKenzie	24 June 1941	Right hand	Right arm fast	Australia
John Maclean	27 April 1946	Right hand	Wicket-keeper	Australia
Jim Parks	21 October 1931	Right hand	Wicket-keeper	England
Glenn Turner	26 May 1947	Right hand	Right arm offbreak	New Zealand

== Tour matches ==
23–25 September 1972
(3-day match)
Scorecard

Rhodesia	v	International Wanderers
476/7d (108 overs); Mike Procter 99; John Jameson 2/12 (4 overs)		276 (96.3 overs); Glenn Turner 91; Duncan Fletcher 3/31 (10.3 overs)
148/4d (33 overs); Stuart Robertson 48*; Brian Close 3/59 (10 overs)		284/8 (95 overs); Basil D'Oliveira 116*; Richard Kaschula 4/71 (35 overs)

Match drawn
Queens Sports Club, Bulawayo
Umpires: R. Batchelor and Ian S. Forrest

- International Wanderers won the toss and decided to field

27 September 1972
(50-over match)
Scorecard

Midlands; 183 (47.1 overs)	v	International Wanderers; 187/9 (49.4 overs)
Brian Davison 70; Brian Close 3/46 (10 overs)		David Green 40; Richard Kaschula 2/15 (10 overs)

International Wanderers won by 1 wicket
Gwelo Sports Club, Gwelo

- Midlands won the toss and decided to bat

29 September – 2 October 1972
(4-day match)
Scorecard

Rhodesia	v	International Wanderers
273 (82.5 overs); Mike Procter 114; Basil D'Oliveira 3/58 (20.5 overs)		124 (40.3 overs); Glenn Turner 45; Mike Procter 4/20 (14 overs)
374/7d (91 overs); Mike Procter 131; Graham McKenzie 2/82 (21 overs)		112 (31.4 overs); David Green 22; Jackie du Preez 6/39 (10.4 overs)

Rhodesia won by 411 runs
Police B Ground, Salisbury
Umpires: F.N. Kelly and Kenneth Poole

- Toss not known
- Glenn Turner was absent hurt for the International Wanderers second innings and did not bat
