= Pieter van der Bijl =

South African cricketer (1907–1973)

Personal information
- Born: 21 October 1907; Kenilworth, Cape Town, Cape Colony
- Died: 16 February 1973 (aged 65); Kalk Bay, Cape Province, South Africa
- Batting: Right-handed
- Relatives: Vintcent van der Bijl (son); Voltelin van der Bijl (uncle)

International information
- National side: South Africa

Domestic team information
- Years: Team
- 1925-26 to 1939-40: Western Province
- 1931 to 1932: Oxford University

Career statistics
Competition	Tests	First-class
Matches	5	44
Runs scored	460	2692
Batting average	51.11	40.17
100s/50s	1/2	5/18
Top score	125	195
Balls bowled	–	406
Wickets	–	5
Bowling average	–	31.60
5 wickets in innings	–	0
10 wickets in match	–	0
Best bowling	–	2/20
Catches/stumpings	1/-	36/2
- Source: CricketArchive

Pieter Gerhard Vintcent van der Bijl (21 October 1907 in Kenilworth, South Africa – 16 February 1973 in Kalk Bay, Cape Province) was a South African cricketer who played in 5 Tests in 1938–39. His son, Vintcent, also had a successful first-class cricket career.

The son of one Western Province cricketer and the nephew of another, Pieter van der Bijl was educated at Diocesan College, Rondebosch, Cape Town, and was then a Rhodes Scholar at Brasenose College, University of Oxford from 1928. A newspaper report in 1930 said that van der Bijl was "reputed to be the tallest man in Oxford". In many reports then and later, his surname was spelled "van der Byl".

== Early cricket ==
His first-class cricket career for Western Province began in 1925–26 and he played regularly for the team in 1926–27, acting as wicketkeeper. Aside from an innings of 60 not out against Eastern Province he did not make much impression as a batsman. After a single game in the 1927–28 season he disappeared from first-class cricket for almost four years.

== English experience ==
At Oxford, van der Bijl initially made a mark in athletics and boxing more than in cricket. In athletics, his event was "putting the weight", as the shot put was termed. He was fourth in the freshman's trial in his first year and later won a half-blue. The following day, he was the heavyweight in the university boxing match against Cambridge University and won his bout, which was the last of the tournament and won the rubber for Oxford by four to three. In cricket, he was not picked for the freshmen's trial match in 1929, and though he played in the seniors' match in 1930, he was not then selected for any of the first-class games; in 1931, he played in a single match, but after scoring 16 not out and 0, he was not chosen again that season.

In 1932, van der Bijl scored a century in one of the Oxford University cricket trial matches and that led to his selection for early matches: once in the team, he did well enough to justify continued selection. Sometimes opening the innings, sometimes batting in the middle order, he scored consistently and totalled 540 runs and an average of 45.00. His best match was against Essex when he made an unbeaten 97 in the first innings and followed that with 60 in the second. Despite his success, however, van der Bijl's batting attracted criticism. The Times, reporting on his 97 not out against Essex, wrote: "His driving too often had the dead and muffled sound that comes from bad timing and a lack of follow-through. Still, his defence was good and if he took an unconscionable time to reach his 50 he deserved the century that he just missed." Wisden Cricketers' Almanack too, in its review of the 1932 Oxford season, was also somewhat faint in its praise: "Van der Bijl seemed to play an unnecessarily laboured game for a man of such fine physique," it wrote. "Patient, with very strong defence, he usually took a long time to settle down and seldom allowed himself the luxury of an attempt to force the game." In a year when Oxford were not strong in cricket, however, van der Bijl was one of the early selections for the University Match, though in a high-scoring drawn game with Cambridge he scored only 7 in his single innings.

== Back in South Africa ==
Leaving Oxford, van der Bijl returned to South Africa, but did not play first-class cricket over the next couple of seasons. He reappeared in three games in the 1934–35 season for Western Province with no great success, and was not in the 1935 South African team in England. The following year, he played only one match, right at the end of the season, and did not feature in the Tests against the Australians. From 1936–37, however, he played more regularly and in 1937–38, he was the captain of the Western Province side. Regular cricket brought more success: he finally hit a first-class century, more than 10 years after his debut, in making 195 against Griqualand West in 1936–37, which would remain his highest first-class score – in this match he also opened the bowling, though he did not take any wickets, and he was never a regular bowler. The following season, in a dozen innings, there were two further centuries and five other scores of more than 50, and he averaged 60.30.

By this time, Van der Bijl's reputation for stodgy batting was well in the past. In the match against Eastern Province at the end of the 1937–38 season, he hit 28 off six balls of the final over of the match to win the game.

== Test cricketer ==
As was usual at that time, the Currie Cup domestic first-class competition was cancelled for the 1938–39 season as there was a tour of South Africa by an England team. Van der Bijl played in an early game for Western Province against the tourists and scored just 19 and 14.

He was then picked as an opening batsman for the first Test of a five-match series, making his debut on Christmas Eve 1938; in this drawn game, he had limited success, scoring 4 and 38. He was more prominent in the second Test, another draw, scoring 37 in the first innings and then, when South Africa was forced to follow on making 87 and sharing a second wicket stand of 147 with Eric Rowan which saved the game. The Times reported: "Van der Byl (sic) played his usual stolid defensive game for the first part of his innings, but later used his great height to hit with vigour." There were no such heroics in the third game which England won by an innings; Van der Bijl scored 28 and 13. Having opened the innings with Bruce Mitchell in the first three matches, van der Bijl had a new opening partner in Alan Melville for the fourth Test, and they responded in South Africa's only innings of the game with a partnership of 108, at which score both batsmen were out, van der Bijl for 31 and Melville for 67. With the series still undecided (England were winning 1–0 with three matches having been drawn), the final Test was intended to be played to a finish: in the event, after a match of unprecedented high scoring, it was left drawn to enable the England team to return home. Van der Bijl had his best match, with innings of 125 and 97. In the first innings, van der Bijl put on 131 for the first wicket with Melville, and batted for the whole of the first day, at the end of which he was 105 not out. His batting was mixture of dour defence and pugnacious stroke-making, according to Wisden's report: "Van der Byl spent forty-five minutes before opening his score and three hours elapsed before he hit a boundary," it wrote. "He did not take the slightest risk though he astonished everyone when he punished Wright for twenty-two in one over, including five boundaries. Next he pulled a ball into the grand stand for 6." In the second innings, Mitchell was restored as van der Bijl's opening partner, and they put on 191 for the first wicket, van der Bijl failing by three runs to become the first South African to score two centuries in a match against England.

In the series as a whole, van der Bijl scored 460 runs at an average of 51.11; his was the second highest aggregate of runs for South Africa in the series, beaten only by Mitchell's 466.

== Later career ==
The Second World War brought an end to competitive cricket in South Africa. Van der Bijl played in a few first-class friendly matches in 1939–40 and in a war-time first-class game a couple of years later, but there was no more Test or Currie Cup cricket for him. He was badly wounded while serving in North Africa during the war, and played no more cricket after that.

His career was as a schoolmaster and he became the headmaster of the Diocesan College Preparatory School in Cape Town. His son, Vintcent van der Bijl, another very tall man, became a successful fast bowler for teams in South Africa and England, though his career coincided with the exclusion of South Africa from international sport because of apartheid and he did not play Test cricket.
