= Peter Lewington =

English cricketer

Personal information
- Full name: Peter John Lewington
- Born: 30 January 1950; Finchampstead, Berkshire, England
- Died: 31 July 2017 (aged 67)
- Batting: Right-handed
- Bowling: Right-arm off break

Domestic team information
- Years: Team
- 1977–1996: Berkshire
- 1978: Minor Counties West
- 1972/73: DH Robins' XI
- 1970–1982: Warwickshire
- 1967–1969: Berkshire

Career statistics
| Competition | FC | LA |
|---|---|---|
| Matches | 72 | 9 |
| Runs scored | 383 | 12 |
| Batting average | 7.36 | 6.00 |
| 100s/50s | 0/0 | 0/0 |
| Top score | 34 | 9* |
| Balls bowled | 12,469 | 438 |
| Wickets | 191 | 8 |
| Bowling average | 29.86 | 33.50 |
| 5 wickets in innings | 6 | 0 |
| 10 wickets in match | 0 | – |
| Best bowling | 7/52 | 3/23 |
| Catches/stumpings | 31/– | 0/– |
- Source: Cricinfo, 17 July 2024

Peter John Lewington (30 January 1950 – 31 July 2017) was an English cricketer. Lewington was a right-handed batsman who bowled right-arm off break. He was born at Finchampstead, Berkshire.

== Early career and Warwickshire ==
Lewington made his debut for Berkshire in 1967 in the Minor Counties Championship against Dorset. He represented the county in 12 Minor Counties matches from 1967 to 1969.

In 1970, Lewington joined Warwickshire where he made his first-class debut against Cambridge University. His debut in the County Championship came in the same season against Somerset. From 1970 to 1982, he represented the county in 50 first-class matches, the last of which came against Worcestershire in the 1982 County Championship. In his 69 first-class matches for Warwickshire, he scored 376 runs at a batting average of 7.37, with a high score of 34. In the field he took 30 catches. He took 187 wickets for the county at a bowling average of 29.01, with six five wicket hauls and best figures of 7/52.

Lewington made his List A debut for Warwickshire against Northamptonshire in the 1971 John Player League. His second and final List-A match for Warwickshire came against the same opposition in the same competition in 1973.

== DH Robins' XI in South Africa 1972/73 ==
The apartheid policy followed by the South African governments of the day meant that no Test-playing nation was willing to tour South Africa. Lewington was a member of DH Robins' XI January–February 1973 tour, with the team referred to as the "International Wanderers". He played first-class matches against Western Province, Natal and Combined Section B XI, taking four wickets.

== Return to Berkshire ==
While in his latter years at Warwickshire, Lewington rejoined his first county, Berkshire. In what would turn out to be a long association with Berkshire, he played 139 Minor Counties Championship matches from 1977 to 1996, the last of which came against Oxfordshire in the 1996 Minor Counties Championship. Lewington also made his debut in the MCCA Knockout Trophy for Berkshire against Norfolk in 1983. From 1983 to 1993, he represented the county in 16 Trophy matches, the last of which came against Hertfordshire.

He also represented Berkshire in List A cricket, with his debut coming against Durham in the 1979 Gillette Cup. From 1979 to 1991, he represented the county in six List A matches, the last of which came against Hampshire in the 1991 NatWest Trophy. In 1978, he also played a List A match for Minor Counties West against Warwickshire in the Benson and Hedges Cup.

Lewington died on 31 July 2017 at the age of 67.
