= Police Grounds, Harare =

Cricket ground in Harare, Zimbabwe

Police Grounds
- The Depot
- Interactive map of Police Grounds

Ground information
- Location: Harare, Mashonaland, Zimbabwe
- Country: Zimbabwe
- Coordinates: 17.8097°S 31.0617°E
- Establishment: c. 1948

Team information
Rhodesia	(1957/58–1979/80)
- As of 4 February 2022; Source: Ground profile

The Police Grounds are a set of cricket grounds in Harare. Located at the Morris Police Depot, the grounds have played host to first-class cricket. The 'A' ground first hosted first-class cricket in 1957, when Rhodesia played the touring Australians. The 'A' ground hosted 29 first-class matches for Rhodesia until 1968, most of which came in the Currie Cup. The 'B' ground began hosting first-class cricket in 1970, with Rhodesia playing against Transvaal. The 'B' ground hosted 27 first-class matches for Rhodesia until 1980, the majority of which came in the Currie Cup. The 'B' ground also played host to seven List A one-day matches from 1970 to 1978.

In addition to hosting cricket matches, the grounds have also hosted rugby union matches for the Zimbabwe rugby union team. It is known as the 'ceremonial home of Zimbabwean rugby' and after a break of almost two decades, international rugby returned there in 2016.

== Cricket records ==
NB: The first-class records listed below are a combination of records from both the 'A' and 'B' grounds.

=== First-class ===
- Highest team total: 537 all out by KwaZulu-Natal v Rhodesia, 1964–65 on 'A' Ground
- Lowest team total: 52 all out by Rhodesia v International Cavaliers, 1960–61 on 'A' Ground
- Highest individual innings: 254 by Mike Procter for Rhodesia v Western Province, 1970–71 on 'B' Ground
- Best bowling in an innings: 8-69 by Joe Partridge for Rhodesia v Natal, 1961–62 on 'A' Ground
- Best bowling in a match: 14-101 by Joe Partridge for Rhodesia v Natal, as above

=== List A ===
- Highest team total: 288 all out by Rhodesia v Natal, 1970–71
- Lowest team total: 108 all out by Natal v Rhodesia, as above
- Highest individual innings: 102 by Graeme Pollock for International Wanderers v Rhodesia, 1974–75
- Best bowling in an innings: 3-21 by Richard Kaschula for Rhodesia v Natal, 1970–71

== See also ==
- List of cricket grounds in Zimbabwe
