= Arthur Short (cricketer) =

South African cricketer (born 1947)

Personal information
- Full name: Arthur Martin Short
- Born: 27 September 1947 (age 79); Graaff-Reinet, Cape Province, South Africa
- Batting: Right-handed

Domestic team information
- Years: Team
- 1966–67 to 1968–69, 1973–74 to 1974–75: Eastern Province
- 1966–67 to 1969–70: South African Universities
- 1969–70 to 1972–73: Natal

Career statistics
Competition	First-class	List A
Matches	66	12
Runs scored	3318	337
Batting average	27.88	30.63
100s/50s	2/21	1/1
Top score	118	115
Balls bowled	98	0
Wickets	3	–
Bowling average	20.66	–
5 wickets in innings	0	–
10 wickets in match	0	–
Best bowling	2/2	–
Catches/stumpings	51/–	4/0
- Source: Cricinfo, 7 October 2015

Arthur Martin Short (born 27 September 1947) is a former South African cricketer. He never played Test cricket for South Africa but was selected on the 1970 squad to tour England and the 1971–72 squad to tour Australia. Both trips were cancelled.

An opening batsman, Short played first-class cricket in South Africa from 1966 to 1975. He top-scored for Natal in their match against the touring Australians in February 1970, scoring 78 and impressing the national selectors.
