= Shukri Conrad =

South African cricketer

Personal information
- Born: 2 April 1967 (age 59); Lansdowne, Cape Province, South Africa
- Batting: Right-handed
- Bowling: Right-arm medium
- Role: All-rounder
- Relatives: Dickie Conrad (father)

Domestic team information
- Years: Team
- 1985–1990: Western Province (SACB)
- 1994–1995: Western Province B

Head coaching information
- Years: Team
- 2010–2011: Uganda
- 2023–present: South Africa

Career statistics
Competition	FC
Matches	13
Runs scored	524
Batting average	24.95
100s/50s	0/3
Top score	63
Balls bowled	733
Wickets	13
Bowling average	23.00
5 wickets in innings	0
10 wickets in match	0
Best bowling	4/35
Catches/stumpings	8/–
Medal record
Men's Cricket
Representing South Africa as Coach
Winner	2023–2025 ICC World Test Championship
- Source: CricketArchive, 1 September 2015

Shukri Conrad (born 2 April 1967) is a South African cricket coach and former first-class cricketer. As the head coach since 2023, he led the South Africa men's national team that won the 2023–2025 World Test Championship.

Conrad played for Western Province teams both before and after the end of racial segregation. He was later a long-serving coach of Cape Cobras and also coached Gauteng and Highveld Lions. He was briefly coach of the Uganda men's national team from 2010 to 2011 before joining the Cricket South Africa National Academy as head coach in 2014.

== Playing career ==
The son of Dickie Conrad, also a first-class cricketer, Conrad was born in Lansdowne, a suburb of Cape Town. He made his debut for Western Province in December 1985, aged 18, during the 1985–86 Howa Bowl season. South African cricket was still racially segregated at that time, and matches in the non-white Howa Bowl were consequently not classed as first-class, with that status being assigned only retrospectively. Conrad played irregularly for Western Province throughout the final years of Howa Bowl's existence, including two matches in the 1990–91 season, the last before integration. A right-handed all-rounder, his best bowling figures, 4/35 from 14 overs, came in his final match in the competition, against Eastern Province in December 1990. In Western Province's second innings in the same match, he scored 63 after being promoted to third in the batting order, which was to be his highest first-class score (and one of only three half-centuries).

The Howa Bowl and the previously white-only Currie Cup were integrated for the 1991–92 season, but Conrad never made Western Province's senior team at that level. However, during the 1994–95 season of the UCB Bowl (the second division of the Currie Cup), he did play five matches for Western Province B, which were accorded first-class status. His highest score in those matches was 61 against Northern Transvaal B, made from fourth in the batting line-up. Conrad finished the season fourth in his side's batting aggregates, in what was his last season at first-class level. His last first-class appearance came at Newlands in January 1995, against a Zimbabwe Board XI that was competing in the tournament as an invitational team. Conrad finished his first-class playing career with a batting average of 24.95 and a bowling average of 23.00, having played a total of thirteen matches.

== Coaching career ==
Conrad first entered the coaching arena during the 1999–2000 season, as coach of a non-first-class team, Gauteng B. He remained in that position until May 2002, when he was named coach of the Gauteng senior team (at the time branded as the Highveld Strikers). He was in charge of that team for the 2002–03 and 2003–04 seasons, with the team winning the Standard Bank Cup during the latter, but after the introduction of franchise cricket for the 2004–05 season took over as the inaugural coach of the Highveld Lions team. Conrad left the Lions in July 2005, instead being named to replace Peter Kirsten as the coach of the Western Province–Boland franchise (now known as the Cape Cobras). He remained in the position until being sacked in April 2010, but during his five-season tenure took the team to three titles – the 2006–07 MTN Domestic Championship, the 2008–09 Standard Bank Pro20 (qualifying the team for the inaugural 2009 Champions League Twenty20), and the 2009–10 Supersport Series.

In October 2010, Conrad was hired as Uganda's new national coach, with the Uganda Cricket Association using funds received from its inclusion in the ICC's High Performance Programme. He replaced another ex-Western Province player, Barney Mohamed, and had had previous experience in Uganda, spending a week in the country in June 2005 (during the South African off-season) to help the national side prepare for the 2005 ICC Trophy. However, Conrad's time as head coach of Uganda was short-lived, as his contract was terminated by mutual agreement in January 2011. He nonetheless agreed to stay on as a member of the technical team for the 2011 World Cricket League tournament, under his replacement as head coach, Martin Suji. In July 2012, Conrad was a candidate for the vacant Dolphins coaching position, but lost out to Lance Klusener. His next major appointment came in April 2014, when he was named head coach of Cricket South Africa's National Academy.

In January 2023, Conrad was appointed as the head coach of South Africa in Test cricket. In April 2023, he was appointed as the coach of South Africa A cricket team, ahead of their tour to Sri Lanka.
