= Anthony Procter =

South African cricketer (1943–2020)

Personal information
- Born: 28 May 1943
- Died: 21 March 2020 (aged 76)
- Relatives: Woodrow Procter (father); Mike Procter (brother)
- Source: Cricinfo, 29 March 2020

Anthony Procter (28 May 1943 – 21 March 2020) was a South African cricketer. He played in four first-class matches for Natal in the 1966/67 season.

He was the brother of Mike Procter.
