= Woodrow Procter =

South African cricketer (1921–2003)

Personal information
- Full name: Woodrow Collacott Procter
- Born: 29 November 1921; Keiskammahoek, Cape Province, Union of South Africa
- Died: 26 July 2003 (aged 81); Westville, KwaZulu-Natal, South Africa
- Batting: Right-handed
- Bowling: Right-arm leg-spin
- Relatives: Anthony Procter (son); Mike Procter (son)

Domestic team information
- Years: Team
- 1938/39–1939/40: Eastern Province
- Source: Cricinfo, 29 March 2020

Woodrow Collacott Procter (29 November 1921 – 26 July 2003) was a South African cricketer. He played in two first-class matches for Eastern Province in 1939 and 1940. His sons, Anthony and Mike, also played first-class cricket, and Mike played Test cricket for South Africa.
