= D. H. Robins' cricket team in Sri Lanka in 1977–78 =

Cricket tour

Derrick Robins assembled a cricket team to tour Sri Lanka in October 1977, playing one first-class and one limited overs match versus the Sri Lanka Board President's XI in Colombo and an additional first-class match versus the Central Province Cricket Association President's XI in Kandy.

Both of the first-class matches were drawn while the tourists won the limited overs game.

The team was captained by Mike Denness and included several well-known players such as David Gower, Peter Willey, Harry Pilling, Intikhab Alam, Roger Tolchard, John Lever, Phil Carrick, Geoff Howarth, John Wright, Chris Cowdrey and John Emburey.

== External sources ==
CricketArchive

== Sources ==
- Wisden Cricketers Almanack
