= Geoff Humpage =

English cricketer (born 1954)

Personal information
- Full name: Geoffrey William Humpage
- Born: 24 April 1954 (age 72); Sparkbrook, Birmingham, England
- Batting: Right-handed
- Bowling: Right-arm medium
- Role: Wicket-keeper-batsman

International information
- National side: England
- ODI debut (cap 59): 4 June 1981 v Australia
- Last ODI: 8 June 1981 v Australia

Domestic team information
- Years: Team
- 1974–1990: Warwickshire
- 1981/82: Orange Free State

Career statistics
Competition	ODI	FC	LA
Matches	3	351	324
Runs scored	11	18,108	6,594
Batting average	5.50	36.36	25.55
100s/50s	0/0	29/97	3/36
Top score	6	254	109*
Balls bowled	–	1,027	773
Wickets	–	13	18
Bowling average	–	42.53	38.55
5 wickets in innings	–	0	0
10 wickets in match	–	0	0
Best bowling	–	2/13	4/53
Catches/stumpings	2/–	671/72	249/32
- Source: CricketArchive, 20 January 2014

Geoffrey William Humpage (born 24 April 1954) is a former England cricketer who played in three One Day Internationals in 1981. Humpage played in county cricket as a hard-hitting middle-order batsman and wicketkeeper for Warwickshire from 1974 to 1990. He was born at Sparkbrook in Birmingham in 1954.

As of 2025, he still holds the Warwickshire batting record for the fourth wicket: a stand of 470 with Alvin Kallicharran against Lancashire at Southport in 1982, of which Humpage contributed 254 (his highest first-class score), in a match which Warwickshire lost by ten wickets. As of 2025, this is the fifth highest fourth-wicket partnership in first-class cricket anywhere, and the highest ever in England. He went on the rebel tour to South Africa in 1981–82, which effectively ended his international career after just three ODIs, despite it having no similar effect on the international careers of other rebel tourists including Graham Gooch, John Emburey and Peter Willey. Humpage remains the only tourist on this tour who never played Test cricket. He was named one of the Wisden Cricketers of the Year in 1985.

An occasional bowler, while bowling in a John Player League match in 1980 he was credited with effecting an unusual run out (of Sussex's Colin Wells) after a delivery hit back by the batsman deflected via Humpage's trouser leg onto the non-striker's stumps. In this year, Humpage helped his county win the John Player League, and he also helped them to win the NatWest Trophy in 1989.

On retirement Humpage become a policeman. In 2001 he spoke out about possible match-fixing in the English game twenty years earlier, saying: "In one game we found ourselves up against a side who [were] suddenly playing kids in important positions. In the Sunday game it was a little bit easier than it should have been. Other people have now said that there are question marks over the two games".
