= Sedick Conrad =

South African cricketer (1942–2025)

Personal information
- Born: 15 February 1942; Newlands, Cape Town, Cape Province
- Died: 11 March 2025 (aged 83)
- Batting: Right handed
- Relatives: Shukri Conrad (son)

Domestic team information
- Years: Team
- 1971/72–1974/75: Western Province
- Source: Cricinfo, 18 July 2020

Sedick "Dickie" Conrad (15 February 1942 – 11 March 2025) was a South African cricketer. He played in ten first-class matches between 1971 and 1975. In 1975, along with Edward Habane, Conrad was one of the first black African players to play in a mixed first-class side against a touring team since the 1890s.

Conrad died on 11 March 2025 at the age of 83.

== See also ==
- International cricket in South Africa from 1971 to 1981
