= Winston Carelse =

South African cricketer (born 1945)

Personal information
- Born: 24 August 1945 (age 81)
- Source: Cricinfo, 19 July 2020

Winston Carelse (born 24 August 1945) is a South African cricketer. He played in eight first-class matches between 1971 and 1978.

== See also ==
- International cricket in South Africa from 1971 to 1981
