= D. H. Robins' cricket team in New Zealand in 1979–80 =

1979–80 cricket team

Sports promoter Derrick Robins assembled a cricket team, captained by Chris Cowdrey, to tour Australia and New Zealand in February and March 1980. The team played only minor cricket in Australia but their schedule in New Zealand included two first-class matches against Northern Districts at Seddon Park, Hamilton and against a Young New Zealand XI at Eden Park, Auckland. These two matches ended in draws. In addition to Cowdrey, Robins' team included Dipak Patel, Bill Athey, Kim Barnett and Nick Cook.
