= Younis Ahmed =

Pakistani former first-class cricketer

Personal information
- Full name: Mohammad Younis Ahmed
- Born: 20 October 1947 (age 79); Jalandhar, Punjab, India
- Batting: Left-handed
- Bowling: Left-arm medium Slow left-arm orthodox
- Relatives: Saeed Ahmed Shagufta Siddique Farkhanda Ahmed Naveed Ahmed Anwar Ahmed Nadeem Ahmed Naseer Ahmed Shamim Ahmed Inayatullah Ahmed

International information
- National side: Pakistan (1969–1987)
- Test debut (cap 62): 24 October 1969 v New Zealand
- Last Test: 4 March 1987 v India
- ODI debut (cap 61): 18 February 1987 v India
- Last ODI: 20 March 1987 v India

Career statistics
Competition	Tests	ODIs	FC	LA
Matches	4	2	460	326
Runs scored	177	84	26,073	8,297
Batting average	29.50	42.00	40.48	29.52
100s/50s	0/1	0/1	46/144	7/46
Top score	62	58	221*	115
Balls bowled	6	–	4,330	1,419
Wickets	0	–	49	32
Bowling average	–	–	42.87	31.87
5 wickets in innings	–	–	0	0
10 wickets in match	–	–	0	0
Best bowling	–	–	4/10	4/37
Catches/stumpings	0/–	1/–	244/–	74/–
- Source: ESPNcricinfo, 19 June 2017

Mohammad Younis Ahmed (born 20 October 1947) is a Pakistani former cricketer who played in four Test matches and two One Day Internationals between 1969 and 1987.

Primarily a middle-order batsman, he played first-class cricket for Pakistan Education Board, Karachi, Lahore, Pakistan International Airlines, Surrey (playing in the side that won the County Championship in 1971), Worcestershire, Glamorgan and South Australia. A consistent performer throughout his career, his interval between Test appearances, 17 years and 111 days (104 Tests, the fourth longest in history), was partly due to his participation in a tour of South Africa with DH Robins' XI in late 1973.

== Cricket career ==
The younger brother of Saeed Ahmed who played for Pakistan between 1958 and 1973, Younis made his first-class debut at the age of 14 for the Pakistan Education Board against South Zone in March 1962.

Younis arrived in England in April 1965 to begin playing cricket for Surrey. He played his first first-class match for the county two months later against a South Africa touring party and made his County Championship debut in 1967. He remained with Surrey until 1978 and was a key part of the side that won the County Championship in 1971. However, he left Surrey in acrimonious circumstances after the club did not renew his contract.

After leaving The Oval Younis was signed by Worcestershire and played there for four years between 1979 and 1983. However his contract was cancelled by the county when allegations arose that Younis had placed bets for his county to lose – allegations which Younis denied. He concluded his English playing career in Glamorgan where he played alongside fellow countryman Javed Miandad.

Younis also played for South Australia during the 1972/73 season, acting as the overseas player on the recommendation of Donald Bradman. Unfortunately, he was not popular with his teammates, who felt his position should have gone to a young local batsman instead of an import with only a moderate international pedigree – especially one who was rumoured to receive $1 per run for the season. He won the Quaid-e-Azam Trophy while playing for Pakistan International Airlines in 1969, matches which were used by Younis to get used to conditions ahead of his international debut.

Younis made two Test appearances against New Zealand in 1969. However, he was banned by the Pakistan Cricket Board for participating in the DH Robins' XI tour to apartheid South Africa in late 1973. The ban was rescinded in 1979, but Younis did not return to international Test cricket until 1987.
