= Voltelin van der Bijl =

South African cricketer

Personal information
- Full name: Voltelin Albert William van der Bijl
- Born: 31 January 1872; Salt River, Cape Town, Cape Colony
- Died: 2 October 1941 (aged 69); Cape Town, South Africa
- Relatives: Pieter van der Bijl (nephew); Vintcent van der Bijl (great-nephew)

Domestic team information
- Years: Team
- 1891–92 to 1895–96: Western Province

Career statistics
Competition	First-class
Matches	7
Runs scored	176
Batting average	17.60
100s/50s	0/1
Top score	61
Balls bowled	1014
Wickets	19
Bowling average	22.15
5 wickets in innings	1
10 wickets in match	0
Best bowling	6/56
Catches/stumpings	5/–
- Source: Cricinfo, 27 May 2020

Voltelin Albert William van der Bijl (31 January 1872 – 2 October 1941) was a South African cricketer who played for Western Province in the 1890s.

Voltelin van der Bijl was an all-rounder who batted in the middle order and opened the bowling. He took 6 for 56 and 3 for 36 in Western Province's victory over Griqualand West in 1890–91. In the 1892–93 season he made his highest first-class score of 61 and took three wickets when Western Province beat Transvaal in Western Province's first appearance in the Currie Cup. He was selected to tour England in South Africa's first overseas tour in 1894 but was unavailable and was replaced by Charles Mills.

His nephew Pieter van der Bijl and Pieter's son Vintcent played cricket for South Africa.
