= Pat Trimborn =

South African cricketer (born 1940)

Personal information
- Full name: Patrick Henry Joseph Trimborn
- Born: 18 May 1940 (age 86); Durban, Natal, South Africa
- Batting: Right-handed
- Bowling: Right-arm fast-medium

International information
- National side: South Africa
- Test debut: 20 January 1967 v Australia
- Last Test: 5 March 1970 v Australia

Domestic team information
- Years: Team
- 1961/62–1975/76: Natal

Career statistics
Competition	Test	First-class
Matches	4	94
Runs scored	13	880
Batting average	6.50	11.89
100s/50s	0/0	0/2
Top score	11*	52
Balls bowled	747	17,739
Wickets	11	314
Bowling average	23.36	22.61
5 wickets in innings	0	12
10 wickets in match	0	1
Best bowling	3/12	6/36
Catches/stumpings	7/–	79/–
- Source: CricketArchive, 12 July 2019

Patrick Henry Joseph Trimborn (born 18 May 1940) is a former South African cricketer who played in four Test matches from 1967 to 1970.

A right-arm fast-medium bowler, Trimborn played first-class cricket for Natal from 1961 to 1976. His best bowling figures came in Natal's match against South African Universities in 1969-70 when he took 5 for 51 and 6 for 36.

He was selected to tour England in 1970 and Australia in 1971-72, but neither tour took place.
