= Edward Habane =

South African cricketer (born 1957)

Personal information
- Born: 1957 (age 68–69)
- Source: Cricinfo, 18 July 2020

Edward Habane (born 1957) is a South African cricketer. He played in one first-class match in 1975. In that match, along with Sedick Conrad, Habane was one of the first black African players to play in a mixed first-class side against a touring team since the 1920s.

== See also ==
- International cricket in South Africa from 1971 to 1981
