= Richard Lumb =

English cricketer (born 1950)

Richard Graham Lumb (born 27 February 1950, Doncaster, Yorkshire, England) is an English first-class cricketer, who started playing cricket for Brodsworth Main C.C. in Doncaster and then represented Yorkshire County Cricket Club from 1969 to 1984. He was educated at Richmond Hill primary school Sprotborough and Percy Jackson Grammar School, Adwick le Street. Lumb was a tall, right-handed opening batsman in an era of limited success for his native county. In 245 first-class matches he scored 11,723 runs at a modest average of 31.17, with 22 hundreds. His best score was 165 not out against Gloucestershire, one of four centuries he recorded against that county. In 137 one day matches he made 2,784 runs at 25.30, with a best score of 101 against Nottinghamshire. Lumb was Geoff Boycott's most regular opening partner, with the pair sharing 29 century stands together.

He also played first-class cricket for the Marylebone Cricket Club (MCC) (1975–1980), Young England (1973), Rest of England (1976) and T. N. Pearce's XI (1976). In addition, he appeared for the Yorkshire Second XI (1968–1984), Yorkshire Under-25s (1972–1974) and the Scarborough Festival XI (1983) in non first-class games.

His son, Michael Lumb, also played for Yorkshire. Lumb is the brother-in-law of the South African first-class cricketer Tony Smith.
