= Grahame Chevalier =

South African cricketer (1937–2017)

Personal information
- Full name: Grahame Anton Chevalier
- Born: 9 March 1937; Cape Town, Cape Province, South Africa
- Died: 14 November 2017 (aged 80); Noordhoek, Cape Town, Western Cape, South Africa
- Batting: Right-handed
- Bowling: Slow left-arm orthodox

International information
- National side: South Africa
- Test debut: 22 January 1970 v Australia

Career statistics
Competition	Tests	First-class
Matches	1	43
Runs scored	0	84
Batting average	0.00	4.94
100s/50s	0/0	0/0
Top score	0*	13*
Balls bowled	253	9,435
Wickets	5	154
Bowling average	20.00	23.72
5 wickets in innings	0	5
10 wickets in match	0	2
Best bowling	3/68	7/57
Catches/stumpings	1/-	15/–
- Source: Cricinfo, 11 March 2019

Grahame Anton Chevalier (9 March 1937 – 14 November 2017) was a South African cricketer who played in one Test in 1970.

Chevalier was a slow left-arm orthodox spin bowler and a right-handed tail-end batsman. His single Test was the first match of the series against Australia in 1969–70 when he took five wickets in a comprehensive South African victory. But he was dropped for the rest of the series and with South Africa's banishment from international cricket because of apartheid after this series, he did not play Test cricket again. He was selected to tour England in 1970 and Australia in 1971–72, but both tours were cancelled.

He played for Western Province from 1966–67 to 1973–74. His best first-class figures were 7 for 57 against Transvaal in 1970–71. At the end of the same season, playing for Rest of South Africa against Transvaal in a trial match to determine the team to tour Australia the following season, he took 7 for 108 and 3 for 66. A genuine number 11 batsman, in all first-class matches he reached double figures only once.
