= Tony Smith (South African cricketer) =

South African cricketer

Personal information
- Full name: Anthony John Shaw Smith
- Born: 8 February 1951 (age 75); Johannesburg, Transvaal, South Africa
- Batting: Right-handed
- Role: Wicket-keeper
- Relatives: Richard Lumb (brother-in-law); Michael Lumb (nephew); Patrick Dewes (cousin)

Domestic team information
- Years: Team
- 1972/73–1983/84: Natal

Career statistics
Competition	First-class	List A
Matches	103	45
Runs scored	3,910	591
Batting average	27.34	19.06
100s/50s	2/18	1/0
Top score	150*	121
Balls bowled	50	–
Wickets	1	–
Bowling average	35.00	–
5 wickets in innings	0	–
10 wickets in match	0	–
Best bowling	1/4	–
Catches/stumpings	309/11	58/6
- Source: Cricinfo, 26 August 2019

Anthony John Shaw Smith (born 8 February 1951) is a South African former cricketer.

Smith was born at Johannesburg in February 1951. He made his debut in first-class cricket for the South African Universities cricket team against Western Province at Newlands in December 1971. He made his debut for Natal in first-class cricket in the 1972–73 Currie Cup against Rhodesia. Smith played first-class cricket for Natal until December 1983, making 96 appearances. Playing as a wicket-keeper, he scored 3,559 runs in these matches at an average of 26.75 and a high score of 150 not out. He made two first-class centuries and fifteen half centuries. Behind the stumps he took 293 catches and made 11 stumpings. Smith also played first-class cricket on four occasions for the South African Board President's XI and once each for a South African Invitation XI and D. H. Robins' XI, the latter in England at Eastbourne against the touring Pakistanis. Smith also played List A one-day cricket for Natal on 43 occasions between the 1972/73 and 1984/84 seasons, scoring 584 runs at an average of 18.83. Smith passed fifty once in one-day cricket, scoring 121 against Border in November 1980. In addition to playing one-day cricket for Natal, he also played twice for a South African Invitation XI.

His brother-in-law, Richard Lumb, and cousin, Patrick Dewes, both played first-class cricket. His nephew, Michael Lumb, played international cricket for England.
