= Kenilworth, Johannesburg =

Kenilworth
- Location within Gauteng Location within South Africa
- Coordinates: 26.246°S 28.049°E
- Country: South Africa
- Province: Gauteng
- Municipality: City of Johannesburg
- Main Place: Johannesburg
- Established: 1906

Area
  - Total: 0.89 km^{2} (0.34 sq mi)

Population (2011)
  - Total: 9,002
  - Density: 10,000/km^{2} (26,000/sq mi)

Racial makeup (2011)
  - Black African: 78.5%
  - Coloured: 7.1%
  - Indian/Asian: 2.6%
  - White: 11.1%
  - Other: 0.8%

First languages (2011)
  - English: 26.7%
  - Zulu: 17.2%
  - Xhosa: 11.2%
  - Afrikaans: 7.7%
  - Other: 37.2%
- Time zone: UTC+2 (SAST)
- Postal code (street): 2190

Kenilworth is a suburb of Johannesburg, South Africa. The suburb has Turffontein to the west and Rosettenville to the east, with the Turffontein Racecourse on its northern boundary. It is located in Region F of the City of Johannesburg Metropolitan Municipality.

== History ==
Prior to the discovery of gold on the Witwatersrand in 1886, the suburb lay on land on one of the original farms called Turffontein. It became a suburb in 1906, with Turffontein and Kenilworth part of Casey's Township.
