= Lorrie Wilmot =

South African cricketer

Personal information
- Full name: Anthony Lorraine Wilmot
- Born: 1 June 1943; Somerset East, Cape Province, Union of South Africa
- Died: 29 February 2004 (aged 60) near Grahamstown, Eastern Cape, South Africa
- Batting: Right-handed
- Bowling: Right-arm medium
- Role: Batsman

Domestic team information
- Years: Team
- 1961/61–1979/80: Eastern Province
- 1985/86–1988/89: Border

Career statistics
Competition	First-class	List A
Matches	147	34
Runs scored	7,687	745
Batting average	32.02	24.03
100s/50s	12/31	1/2
Top score	222*	101*
Balls bowled	1,669	248
Wickets	18	5
Bowling average	45.11	47.60
5 wickets in innings	0	0
10 wickets in match	0	0
Best bowling	2/4	2/32
Catches/stumpings	108/–	8/–
- Source: CricketArchive, 3 June 2025

Anthony Lorraine "Lorrie" Wilmot (1 June 1943 – 29 February 2004) was a South African first-class cricketer from Cape Province who played from 1960–61 to 1988–89.

== Career ==
A big hitting right-handed batsman, Wilmot is said to have once hit a six off New Zealand spinner John Sparling that went 120 metres.

His highest score of 222 not out made against Southern Rhodesia in 1965–66 was at the time the second highest score achieved by an Eastern Province batsman.

== Controversy ==
As acting captain of Eastern Province at Bulawayo during the 1972–73 Currie Cup, Wilmot was involved in a walkout. Rhodesia had been set 300 to win and in the final hour of the game they needed six more runs. A minimum of 20 overs had to be bowled in the final hour according to the rules. With Mike Procter and Paddy Clift at the crease and 3 wickets in hand, Wilmot led his team off the field while claiming falsely that the 20 overs had been bowled. Wilmot refused to re-enter the field and the umpires were forced to award the match to Rhodesia. The decision however was oddly overturned by the South African authorities and they declared the match a draw. As a result, Rhodesia missed out on winning their maiden Currie Cup title.

In 2000, he was convicted of raping a 13-year-old girl. After a long appeals process, he was sentenced to 12 years in prison with three of them suspended.

== Death ==
On 29 February 2004, Wilmot committed suicide by shooting himself on his farm near Grahamstown. Although it is likely that he committed suicide due to his impending imprisonment, he was also rumoured to be suffering from an incurable disease.
