= Robbie Muzzell =

South African cricketer (born 1945)

Personal information
- Full name: Robert Kendal Muzzell
- Born: 23 December 1945 (age 80); Stutterheim, South Africa
- Batting: Right-handed
- Bowling: Right-arm leg-spin

Domestic team information
- Years: Team
- 1964/65–1967/68: Western Province
- 1968/69–1973/74: Transvaal
- 1974/75: Eastern Province
- 1975/76–1977/78: Transvaal

Career statistics
Competition	First-class	List A
Matches	75	10
Runs scored	4,052	137
Batting average	34.93	15.22
100s/50s	7/18	0/0
Top score	238*	27
Balls bowled	3,960	72
Wickets	61	0
Bowling average	33.24	–
5 wickets in innings	1	–
10 wickets in match	0	–
Best bowling	6/69	–
Catches/stumpings	49/–	4/–
- Source: Cricinfo, 6 May 2022

Robert Kendal Muzzell (born 23 December 1945) is a South African former cricketer. He played in 75 first-class and 10 List A matches between the 1964–65 season and 1977–78.

Muzzell was born at Stutterheim in 1945. A leg-spin bowler, he made his first-class debut for Western Province during the 1964–65 season. After he retired from playing he became a cricket coach and administrator. He was involved in the process through which the white-dominated South African Cricket Union and the non-racial South African Cricket Board merged during the late 1980s to become the United Cricket Board of South Africa. He managed the South African side during their 1993–94 tour of Australia and at the 1996 Cricket World Cup. Muzzell was involved with the administration of the Border cricket team for a number of years and became the association's president.
