= International cricket in 1981 =

International cricket season

The 1981 International cricket season was from May 1981 to August 1981.

== Season overview ==
International tours
Start date	Home team	Away team	Results [Matches]			
Start date	Home team	Away team	Test	ODI	FC	LA
4 June 1981	England	Australia	3–1 [6]	1–2 [3]	—	—

== June ==
=== Australia in England ===
ODI series
No.	Date	Home captain	Away captain	Venue	Result
ODI 119	4 June	Ian Botham	Kim Hughes	Lord's, London	England by 6 wickets
ODI 120	6 June	Ian Botham	Kim Hughes	Edgbaston Cricket Ground, Birmingham	Australia by 2 runs
ODI 121	8 June	Ian Botham	Kim Hughes	Headingley Cricket Ground, Leeds	Australia by 71 runs
The Ashes Test series
No.	Date	Home captain	Away captain	Venue	Result
Test 903	18–21 June	Ian Botham	Kim Hughes	Trent Bridge, Nottingham	Australia by 4 wickets
Test 904	2–7 July	Ian Botham	Kim Hughes	Lord's, London	Match drawn
Test 905	16–21 July	Mike Brearley	Kim Hughes	Headingley Cricket Ground, Leeds	England by 18 runs
Test 906	30 Jul–2 August	Mike Brearley	Kim Hughes	Edgbaston Cricket Ground, Birmingham	England by 29 runs
Test 907	13–17 August	Mike Brearley	Kim Hughes	Old Trafford Cricket Ground, Manchester	England by 103 runs
Test 908	27 Aug–1 September	Mike Brearley	Kim Hughes	Kennington Oval, London	Match drawn
