= Douglas Neilson =

South African cricketer (born 1948)

Personal information
- Born: 17 December 1948 (age 77)
- Source: Cricinfo, 19 July 2020

Douglas Neilson (born 17 December 1948) is a South African cricketer. He played in 87 first-class and 25 List A matches between 1968 and 1981.

== See also ==
- International cricket in South Africa from 1971 to 1981
