= Ponting =

Ponting is a surname. Notable people with the name include:

- Charles Ponting (1850–1932), English architect
- Chris Ponting, British biologist
- Clive Ponting (1946–2020), UK civil servant and writer
- Herbert Ponting (1870–1935), British photographer
- Nick Ponting, British badminton player
- Ricky Ponting (born 1974), former Australian cricket player and captain
- Thomas Ponting, British entrepreneur, founder of Pontings department store
- Tom Ponting (born 1965), Canadian swimmer
- Tom Candy Ponting (1824–1916), cattleman and pioneer cattle driver
- Walter Ponting (1913–1960), English footballer
- William Ponting (1872–1952), English footballer
