= Abdullatief Barnes =

South African cricketer (1941–2022)

Personal information
- Born: 29 April 1941
- Died: 28 February 2022 (aged 80)
- Source: Cricinfo, 19 July 2020

Abdullatief Barnes (29 April 1941 – 28 February 2022), nicknamed "Tiefie", was a South African cricketer. He played in 28 first-class matches between 1971 and 1978.

Barnes played in the side representing Transvaal.

== See also ==
- International cricket in South Africa from 1971 to 1981
