= Kevin Verdoorn =

South African cricketer (1955–2022)

Personal information
- Full name: Kevin Derek Verdoorn
- Born: 24 July 1955; Pretoria, Transvaal, South Africa
- Died: 29 September 2022 (aged 67)
- Batting: Right-handed
- Bowling: Right-arm medium

Domestic team information
- Years: Team
- 1972/73–1978/79, 1982/83–1988/89: Northern Transvaal
- 1979/80–1981/82: Natal
- Source: Cricinfo, 18 July 2020

Kevin Derek Verdoorn (24 July 1955 – 29 September 2022) was a South African cricketer. He played in 83 first-class and 56 List A matches between 1972 and 1989.
