= Ismail Ebrahim =

South African cricketer (1946–2020)

Baboo Ebrahim
Personal information
- Full name: Ismail Ebrahim
- Born: 5 November 1946; Durban, Natal Province, South Africa
- Died: 18 July 2020 (aged 73); Durban, KwaZulu-Natal, South Africa
- Batting: Right-handed
- Bowling: Slow left-arm orthodox
- Role: Spin bowler

Domestic team information
- Years: Team
- 1971-1985: Natal

Career statistics
Competition	FC	LA
Matches	48	2
Runs scored	520	3
Batting average	10.19	3.00
100s/50s	0/0	0/0
Top score	47	3
Balls bowled	10,793	96
Wickets	179	0
Bowling average	21.33	–
5 wickets in innings	8	0
10 wickets in match	2	–
Best bowling	7/50	–
Catches/stumpings	35/–	0/–
- Source: ESPNcricinfo, 19 July 2020

Ismail "Baboo" Ebrahim (5 November 1946 – 18 July 2020) was a South African cricketer.

A slow left-arm orthodox spin bowler, Ebrahim played 48 first-class matches and two List A matches, mostly for Natal, between 1971 and 1984. He played in the Dadabhay Trophy tournament for non-white cricketers until the 1977–78 season, when he represented Natal B in the Castle Bowl, the second division of "white" first-class cricket, and would go on to play in the Currie Cup in the 1978–79 season.

In addition to playing in the previously exclusively white Currie Cup, Ebrahim was one of several non-white cricketers to join white cricket clubs in the 1970s in spite of the apartheid laws that existed during his cricket career. He also represented Radcliffe in the Central Lancashire Cricket League for one season.

Ebrahim was selected to play for the South African Invitational XI against the International Wanderers in 1976. He took 6 for 66 in the second innings, his wickets including Greg Chappell and Mike Denness. He later represented South Africa in Masters cricket events.

Ebrahim died in Durban on 18 July 2020.
