= Pelham Henwood =

South African cricketer (born 1946)

Personal information
- Full name: Pelham Peter Henwood
- Born: 22 May 1946 (age 80); Berea, Durban, Natal, South Africa
- Batting: Right-handed
- Bowling: Slow left-arm orthodox
- Role: Bowler

Domestic team information
- Years: Team
- 1965/66: Orange Free State
- 1966/67–1979/80: Natal

Career statistics
Competition	First-class	List A
Matches	79	18
Runs scored	769	68
Batting average	9.61	11.33
100s/50s	0/0	0/0
Top score	46	22
Balls bowled	14,727	1,096
Wickets	212	36
Bowling average	27.72	16.75
5 wickets in innings	9	3
10 wickets in match	1	n/a
Best bowling	7/34	7/21
Catches/stumpings	26/–	3/–
- Source: Cricinfo, 17 July 2026

Pelham Peter Henwood (born 22 May 1946) is a former South African cricketer. A left-arm spin bowler, he played in 79 first-class matches, mostly for Natal, between 1965–66 and 1979–80.

Henwood was a member of the mixed-race South African Board President's XI that played against the DH Robins XI when they toured in 1975, and took six wickets in the match. He was one of the four South African Cricket Annual Cricketers of the Year in 1974.

Henwood's best first-class bowling figures were 7 for 34 (after 2 for 57 in the first innings) when Natal defeated Transvaal by an innings in the last match of the 1973–74 season to win the Currie Cup. His best match figures were 10 for 151 for Natal B against Griqualand West in 1969–70. His best one-day figures were 7 for 21 for Natal against Border in 1972–73.
