= Howard Bergins =

South African cricketer (1954–2023)

Personal information
- Full name: Howard William Harold Bergins
- Born: 18 October 1954; Oudtshoorn, Cape Province, South Africa
- Died: 16 November 2023 (aged 69); Strand, Western Cape, South Africa
- Batting: Right-handed
- Bowling: Right-arm fast-medium

Domestic team information
- Years: Team
- 1975/76: Western Province
- 1981/82–1986/87: Boland
- Source: Cricinfo, 19 July 2020

Howard William Harold Bergins (18 October 1954 – 16 November 2023) was a South African cricketer. He played in 22 first-class matches between 1975 and 1987.

Bergins died in November 2023 at the age of 69. He had been working as coach of the South African over-40s team at the time of his death.

== See also ==
- International cricket in South Africa from 1971 to 1981
