= South African cricket team in England in 1970 (proposed) =

The South African national cricket team was scheduled to tour England over the 1970 English summer. However, the tour was cancelled after protests from the anti-apartheid movement.

It was replaced by a Rest of the World team.

== South African squad ==
South Africa
- Ali Bacher (c)
- Eddie Barlow
- Grahame Chevalier
- Lee Irvine
- Tiger Lance
- Denis Lindsay (wk)
- Graeme Pollock
- Peter Pollock
- Mike Procter
- Barry Richards
- Arthur Short
- John Traicos
- Pat Trimborn
- Gary Watson

== Revised tour schedule ==
The original tour schedule contained 28 matches. The Cricket Council, the governing body of English cricket, met at Lord's on 12 February 1970 when they decided to revise the tour programme, cutting it from 28 to 12 matches. Grounds at which the police would find it difficult to maintain order were excluded from the itinerary. The fixture list was published in that year's Wisden Cricketers' Almanack.

Date	Opponents	Venue
6, 8, 9 June	Southern Counties	Lord's, London
10, 11, 12 June	Northern Counties	Trent Bridge, Nottingham
13, 15, 16 June	Yorkshire	Headingley, Leeds
18, 19, 20, 22, 23 June	England (1st Test)	Lord's, London
27, 29, 30 June	Warwickshire	Edgbaston, Birmingham
2, 3, 4, 6, 7 July	England (2nd Test)	Trent Bridge, Nottingham
11, 13, 14 July	Surrey	The Oval, London
16, 17, 18, 20, 21 July	England (3rd Test)	Edgbaston, Birmingham
25, 26, 27 July	Glamorgan	St Helen's, Swansea
30, 31 July, 1, 3, 4 August	England (4th Test)	Headingley, Leeds
8, 10, 11 August	Lancashire	Old Trafford, Manchester
13, 14, 15, 17, 18 August	England (5th Test)	The Oval, London
