= Darryl Bestall =

South African cricketer (born 1952)

Personal information
- Born: 28 May 1952 (age 74)
- Source: Cricinfo, 18 July 2020

Darryl Bestall (born 28 May 1952) is a South African cricketer. He played in 113 first-class and 75 List A matches between 1971 and 1988.
