= Andre Bruyns =

South African cricketer (1946–2022)

Personal information
- Born: 19 September 1946; Pietermaritzburg, Natal, South Africa
- Died: 14 April 2022 (aged 75); Plumstead, Cape Town, Western Cape, South Africa
- Batting: Right-handed

Domestic team information
- Years: Team
- 1966/67–1976/77: Western Province
- 1972/73: Natal

Career statistics
Competition	FC	List A
Matches	90	19
Runs scored	5050	596
Batting average	33.44	31.36
100s/50s	11/23	1/4
Top score	197	113
Balls bowled	52	8
Wickets	1	0
Bowling average	25.00	–
5 wickets in innings	0	–
10 wickets in match	0	–
Best bowling	1/1	2–
Catches/stumpings	106/–	7/–
- Source: Cricinfo, 7 October 2022

Andre Bruyns (19 September 1946 – 14 April 2022) was a South African cricketer. He played in 90 first-class matches between 1965 and 1977.
