= Dassie Biggs =

South African cricketer (born 1946)

Personal information
- Full name: Anthony Llewellyn Biggs
- Born: 26 April 1946 (age 80); Graaff-Reinet, Cape Province, South Africa
- Nickname: Dassie
- Batting: Right-handed
- Bowling: Right-arm off-spin

Domestic team information
- Years: Team
- 1964–65 to 1980–81: Eastern Province

Career statistics
Competition	FC	List A
Matches	62	16
Runs scored	3409	480
Batting average	32.77	34.28
100s/50s	8/16	0/2
Top score	156	67*
Balls bowled	6144	466
Wickets	82	13
Bowling average	34.28	22.46
5 wickets in innings	4	0
10 wickets in match	1	0
Best bowling	7/62	4/21
Catches/stumpings	35/–	3/0
- Source: Cricinfo, 17 October 2016

Anthony Llewellyn "Dassie" Biggs (born 26 April 1946) is a South African former cricketer. He was an opening batsman and off-spin bowler who played first-class cricket for Eastern Province from 1964 to 1980.
