= Lee Irvine =

South African cricketer

Personal information
- Full name: Brian Lee Irvine
- Batting: Left-handed
- Bowling: Right-arm medium
- Role: Batsman, sometimes wicket-keeper

International information
- National side: South Africa

Career statistics
Competition	Tests	First-class
Matches	4	157
Runs scored	353	9919
Batting average	50.42	40.48
100s/50s	1/2	21/46
Top score	102	193
Balls bowled	–	228
Wickets	–	1
Bowling average	–	142.00
5 wickets in innings	–	0
10 wickets in match	–	0
Best bowling	–	1/39
Catches/stumpings	2/-	240/7
- Source: Cricinfo

Brian Lee Irvine (born 9 March 1944 in Durban, South Africa) is a former cricketer who played four Tests for South Africa in 1969–70 in the last Test series played by South Africa before official sporting links were broken over the apartheid policy.

== Career ==
Irvine was a hard-hitting left-handed middle-order batsman, a fine outfielder who became a regular wicketkeeper and an occasional right-arm medium pace bowler. He played one first-class match as an 18-year-old for a Western Province XI against the International Cavaliers – he turned 19 during the match. But he did not then reappear in first-class cricket until he became a regular in the Natal side in the 1965–66 season.

After two seasons of modest batting, Irvine made a big advance in the 1967–68 season, scoring 504 runs in the South African domestic season and hitting his first two centuries. He was, however, pretty much an unknown quantity when he was signed by Essex as an overseas player for the 1968 English cricket season, the first season when limited numbers of overseas players were allowed to be registered without a period of qualification or a special dispensation.

Irvine proved a success in county cricket. In his first season for Essex, he scored 1,439 runs, and though he did not score a century, he made his runs fast and hit a lot of sixes. Wisden Cricketers' Almanack for 1969 recorded that "rarely did he emerge from a match without hitting at least one six, and in fact he was responsible for more sixes than any other player in first-class cricket". He was awarded his county cap in his first season.

His record in South African domestic cricket for Natal in 1968–69 was very similar to his English record: a lot of runs but no centuries. He returned to Essex for 1969, and increased his batting average, though Wisden remarked that he was less forthright in his batting. He finally scored a century for Essex in the match against Glamorgan at the end of the season.

In South Africa in 1969–70, Irvine transferred to Transvaal. His batting immediately moved up a notch in terms of averages and aggregates and he also started to keep wicket regularly for the team. In that season, South Africa played the last of the pre-apartheid Test matches against a touring team from Australia, and Irvine was selected for all four Tests as a batsman only. He batted at No 6 in the first two matches and then, in the third match at Johannesburg, made 79 out of 117 in the first innings and a quick-fire 73 in the second innings as South Africa took a decisive 3–0 lead in the series. In the final match, batting at No 5, he made 102 in the second innings as South Africa sought, successfully, to bat Australia out of the match. With 353 runs in the four-match series, Irvine finished with a Test average of more than 50.

Irvine did not play Test cricket again and in fact never played cricket outside the domestic South African competitions after this brief taste of Test cricket. He was selected for the proposed tours of England in 1970 and Australia in 1971–72, but the tours were called off, and though other players, such as Barry Richards and Mike Procter, returned to their English counties, Irvine did not go back to Essex after 1969. He played regularly for Transvaal for the next seven seasons, making a lot of runs and also acting as the regular wicketkeeper for the first five years. He was Transvaal captain in 1974–75 and 1975–76. He retired after the 1976–77 season.
