= Richard Kaschula =

Zimbabwean cricketer

Personal information
- Full name: Richard Herbert Kaschula
- Born: 9 November 1946 (age 80); Gwelo, Midlands
- Batting: Right-handed
- Bowling: Slow left-arm orthodox
- Role: Bowler

Domestic team information
- Years: Team
- 1970/71–1979/80: Rhodesia
- 1980/81–1981/82: Zimbabwe

Career statistics
Competition	First-class	List A
Matches	48	7
Runs scored	273	1
Batting average	7.37	0.50
100s/50s	0/0	0/0
Top score	22	1
Balls bowled	11,985	128
Wickets	196	5
Bowling average	25.71	25.60
5 wickets in innings	7	0
10 wickets in match	1	0
Best bowling	6/68	3/21
Catches/stumpings	22/–	2/–
- Source: CricInfo, 6 March 2014

Richard Herbert Kaschula (born 9 November 1946) is a former Zimbabwean cricketer, described by CricInfo's Martin Williamson as "a legendary character in Zimbabwe cricket".

A slow left-arm orthodox bowler from Midlands, Rhodesia, Kaschula was a leading figure in the Rhodesian side throughout the 1970s. His batting was negligible, and his weight – up to 20 stone (c. 120 kg) during his career – made him slow in the field, but his bowling was effective and sometimes match-winning. In his first season of first-class cricket he took 41 wickets at an average of 14.83, helping Rhodesia to victory in the B Section of the Currie Cup. His best first-class figures came in October 1980 for Zimbabwe against the touring Middlesex team, when he took 6 for 68 and 4 for 98, and Zimbabwe won by four wickets.

Kaschula was South African Cricket Annual Cricketer of the Year for 1972. He took 196 first class wickets at 25.71, 120 of them for Rhodesia and 44 for the Zimbabwe national cricket team after the country became independent but before it achieved Test status. After retiring he became a national selector. In 2006, following the government takeover of cricket administration, he was removed. His cousin, Nathaniel Kaschula, also played first-class cricket.
