= Vintcent van der Bijl =

South African cricketer

Vince van der Bijl
Personal information
- Full name: Vintcent Adriaan Pieter van der Bijl
- Born: 19 March 1949 (age 77); Rondebosch, Cape Town, South Africa
- Height: 6 ft 7 1/2 in (2.02 m)
- Batting: Right-handed
- Bowling: Right-arm fast-medium
- Role: Bowler

Domestic team information
- Years: Team
- 1967–1980: Natal
- 1980: Middlesex
- 1983: Transvaal

Career statistics
Competition	First-class	List A
Matches	156	92
Runs scored	2269	517
Batting average	16.20	15.66
100s/50s	–/1	–/–
Top score	87	47
Balls bowled		5237
Wickets	767	132
Bowling average	16.54	18.06
5 wickets in innings	46	4
10 wickets in match	12	–
Best bowling	8/35	5/12
Catches/stumpings	51/–	21/–
- Source: , 20 June 2019

Vintcent Adriaan Pieter van der Bijl (born 19 March 1949) is a retired South African cricketer. He was born in Rondebosch, Cape Town, where his father, Pieter van der Bijl, was headmaster of the Diocesan College Preparatory School after retiring from playing first-class cricket for Western Province and South Africa. His grandfather, V.A.W. van der Bijl (also Vintcent), and great-uncle, Voltelin van der Bijl, also played first-class cricket for Western Province.

He was educated at the Diocesan College Rondebosch, where he not only excelled at cricket, but, owing to his size and strength, was a useful rugby union player and outstanding shot putter and at the University of Natal. While at university he came under the influence of Trevor Goddard. After graduating, he became a teacher at Maritzburg College in Pietermaritzburg and played first-class cricket as an amateur for Natal from 1968/69 to 1979/80. He was South African Cricket Annual Cricketer of the Year in 1971. He was appointed captain of Natal in 1976/7, the year the team won the Currie Cup and Datsun Shield.

He gave up teaching in 1979 and went to work for Wiggins Teape, but he was given leave to play for Middlesex in 1980. He took 85 first-class wickets for Middlesex at a bowling average of 14.72, the third-best first-class bowling average for that season among bowlers with more than 20 wickets, behind Joel Garner and Richard Hadlee. Middlesex won the County Championship and the Gillette Cup, and he was named one of the five Wisden Cricketers of the Year in 1981. He played a final season for Transvaal in 1982/3. In all, he played in 156 first-class matches, taking 767 wickets at an average of 16.55.

He was tall, 202 cm (6 ft 7½in), and bowled his fast-medium deliveries with accuracy, pace and bounce. The peak of his playing career was during the years of South African sporting isolation, as a result of the South African government's apartheid policies. He was picked for the 1971/72 South African tour to Australia which was cancelled in the wake of the d'Oliveira affair. Cricinfo describes him as "one of the best bowlers not to play Test cricket".

In 2008 he was named ICC umpires' and referees' manager.

== See also ==
- International cricket in South Africa from 1971 to 1981
