= Derrick Robins =

English cricketer and sports promoter

- Robbins in 1978

Personal information
- Full name: Derrick Harold Robins
- Born: 27 June 1914; Bexleyheath, Kent, England
- Died: 3 May 2004 (aged 89); Bishopscourt, Western Cape, South Africa
- Batting: Right-handed
- Role: Wicket-keeper

Domestic team information
- Years: Team
- 1947: Warwickshire

Career statistics
Competition	First-class
Matches	5
Runs scored	70
Batting average	17.50
100s/50s	–/–
Top score	29*
Catches/stumpings	4/–
- Source: Cricinfo, 28 July 2024

Derrick Harold Robins (27 June 1914 – 3 May 2004) was an English cricketer and sports promoter, twice chairman of Coventry City Football Club. He was born in Bexleyheath, Kent and became a self-made millionaire running Banbury Buildings, a firm which made pre-fabricated buildings and sheds.

Robins played two matches for Warwickshire in 1947, but did little and never played county cricket again. Extraordinarily, his third first-class appearance would come 22 years later, when he appeared for his own "D. H. Robins's XI" against the touring West Indians at The Saffrons, Eastbourne. Robins made two further appearances for his own XI, against Oxford University in 1969 and against the Indians in 1971, the latter game coming a few days after his 57th birthday.

However, he was better known as the promoter who took several strong sides to apartheid South Africa in the 1970s. Between 1972/73 and 1975/76 a D. H. Robins's XI played in the country each winter. In those days there were no sanctions against cricketers who visited South Africa, and Robins's teams included players of high quality, including such names as Bob Willis, Brian Close, Tony Greig and Trevor Chappell. Detailed accounts of these matches can be found in the International cricket in South Africa from 1971 to 1981 article.

In football, he first took charge of Coventry City F.C. in 1959, who were at the time struggling in the lower ranks of the Football League. Together with manager Jimmy Hill, Robins oversaw what was known as the "Sky Blue Revolution": he changed the team colours from royal-and-white to all-sky blue, adopted innovative marketing and fan engagement practices, rebuilt Highfield Road stadium, invested in a new training ground at Ryton-on-Dunsmore, and built a side that eventually won promotion to the First Division in 1967. He would later return as chairman in the mid-1970s (with Hill, now well-known as the host of Match of the Day, returning as managing director) as City consolidated their place in the top tier.

He also took first-class teams to Sri Lanka in 1977–78 and New Zealand in 1979–80.

He died on 3 May 2004.
