= Mike Procter =

South African cricketer (1946–2024)

Personal information
- Full name: Michael John Procter
- Born: 15 September 1946; Durban, Natal, Union of South Africa
- Died: 17 February 2024 (aged 77) uMhlanga, KwaZulu-Natal, South Africa
- Nickname: Prock, Procky
- Batting: Right-handed
- Bowling: Right-arm fast
- Role: All rounder
- Relatives: Woodrow Procter (father); Anthony Procter (brother); Andrew Procter (cousin)

International information
- National side: South Africa
- Test debut (cap 228): 20 January 1967 v Australia
- Last Test: 5 March 1970 v Australia

Domestic team information
- Years: Team
- 1965–1981: Gloucestershire
- 1965/66–1988/89: Natal
- 1969/70: Western Province
- 1970/71–1975/76: Rhodesia
- 1987/88: Orange Free State

Career statistics
Competition	Test	FC	LA
Matches	7	401	271
Runs scored	226	21,936	6,624
Batting average	25.11	36.01	27.94
100s/50s	0/0	48/109	5/36
Top score	48	254	154*
Balls bowled	1,514	65,404	12,335
Wickets	41	1,417	344
Bowling average	15.02	19.53	18.76
5 wickets in innings	1	70	7
10 wickets in match	0	15	0
Best bowling	6/73	9/71	6/13
Catches/stumpings	4/–	325/–	91/–
- Source: CricketArchive, 27 October 2008

Michael John Procter (15 September 1946 – 17 February 2024) was a South African cricketer, whose involvement in international cricket was limited by South Africa's banishment from world cricket in the 1970s and 1980s. A fast bowler and hard-hitting batsman, he was regarded as one of South African cricket's top allrounders.

Procter began his career mainly as a menacing fast bowler, who famously "bowled off the wrong foot", and became well known in the cricketing fraternity for his chest-on action and for his ability to release the ball early in his delivery stride. He rose to prominence as a frontline fast bowler in first-class cricket, and went on to capture 1417 wickets across 401 first-class matches, averaging a healthy 19.53, whereas he also showcased his prowess with the ball in List A cricket by picking up 344 wickets at an exceptional average of 18.76.

Procter also gained a reputation for being an outstanding batter of his generation, becoming only one of three players to strike a record six consecutive centuries in first class cricket, alongside Don Bradman and C. B. Fry.

Gloucestershire was affectionately nicknamed "Proctershire" when Procter played for Gloucestershire in English county cricket, due to his scoring over 20,000 runs and taking more than 1,000 wickets for the club. Procter was also one of only three players to score a century and take a hat-trick in the same match while playing for Gloucestershire, and he remains the only player to complete the unique distinction twice for the club, having achieved it against Essex in 1972 and against Leicestershire in 1979.

Following his retirement from playing the game, Procter was active as a coach, commentator and selector, and was appointed a match referee by the ICC. His tenure as referee involved several controversies.

Procter was named Cricketer of the Year for South Africa in 1967, and by Wisden in 1970, who described him as "One of the rare cricketers who could have found a place in any test team as either a batsman or bowler, and who could win a game single-handed with bat or ball in his hand". He died in 2024.

== Early and personal life ==
Michael John Procter was born on 15 September 1946 in Durban. Educated at Hilton College, he played for Natal in the Nuffield week and for South African schools in 1963 and 1964. His brother, Anthony Procter, cousin A. C. Procter and father Woodrow Procter all played first-class cricket.

Procter married tennis player Maryna Godwin.

== Playing career ==
=== International career ===
The ban on South Africa restricted his Test career to seven test match appearances, all against Australia between 1967 and 1970. He took 41 Test wickets at an average of 15.02, and with Barry Richards and Graeme Pollock helped South Africa to two successive series wins over Australia by margins of 3–1 and 4–0.

Procter played for the Rest of the World versus England in 1970, and took 15 wickets at an average of 23.93 in five test-format matches.

In 1978–79, towards the end of his playing career, he played for the World XI in Kerry Packer's World Series Cricket in Australia. In the four "Supertests" in which he played he averaged 30.33 with the bat and 16.07 with the ball. He featured in the first semi-final for World XI side and he shared the new ball with the likes of Imran Khan and John Snow. He clean bowled West Indian veteran Viv Richards with an unplayable delivery which he delivered from over the wicket. The delivery he bowled to Richards castled the middle stump out of the ground and it became a talking point at the time given the characteristic swagger of Richards.

Procter also captained the Springbok team that played in three "tests" and three "one day internationals" against an English rebel XI, led by Graham Gooch, that toured South Africa in 1982. He revealed that he once came close to qualifying to play for the England national team in 1980, but his body was tired by the time such news apparently began to spread. However, he insisted that his callup to join England was merely speculation and was more of a ploy to allow Gloucestershire to sign another overseas player.

=== South African domestic cricket ===
Procter is the only man to twice make over 500 runs and take 50 wickets in a domestic South African season, in 1971–72 and 1972–73, when he took a then record 59 wickets in eight Currie Cup games. In 1970, he scored six successive first-class centuries for Rhodesia. He reached his record sixth successive century in first-class cricket playing for Rhodesia against Western Province in 1971 and his century came at a vital time especially when Rhodesia was reeling at 5–2. He became only the third batsman in the world to score six first-class centuries in six consecutive innings after C. B. Fry and Don Bradman and the only South African to do so. He capitalized on a costly drop catch by Western Province captain Andre Bruyns, who was on slip, when Procter had only scored two runs, and went on to make the most of the dropped chance by scoring 254 runs, which also turned out to be his highest-first-class score. Rhodesia went onto win that match by seven wickets.

He played for and captained South Africa in one unofficial "Test".

=== Proctershire ===
Procter played county cricket for 13 years as an overseas player for Gloucestershire and led them to great success. The team was occasionally referred to in jest as "Proctershire". His chest-on pace bowling lifted Gloucestershire to second in 1969 as he contributed more than 100 wickets for the club in the same season. Four centuries followed in 1971, the last lifting them from 28 for three to a target of 201 in just over two hours against Yorkshire. Procter scored 109 not out in Gloucestershire's 135/3 in the 1972 John Player League – the lowest team total in List A cricket to include a century. He destroyed Worcestershire single-handedly in 1977, scoring a century before lunch and taking 13 wickets for 73 runs. He scored another century before lunch in 1979, against Leicestershire, winning the Walter Lawrence Trophy for the season's fastest century, and then ripped through their batsmen with a hat-trick. In the next game against Yorkshire he took another hat-trick, all leg-before-wicket. In August 1979, he also famously smashed six successive sixes off the bowling of Somerset's Dennis Breakwell, albeit not in the same over.

He captained Gloucestershire with distinction from 1977 to 1981, and was popular with teammates and supporters. He was the Professional Cricketers' Association Player of the Year in 1970 and 1977, and won the Cricket Society Wetherall Award for the Leading All-Rounder in English First-Class Cricket in 1978. Mike Procter also produced a spell for the ages by grabbing everyone's attention capturing 4 wickets in 5 balls playing for Gloucestershire against Hampshire in a crucial semi-final match during the 1977 Benson and Hedges Cup. He ripped through the top order of Hampshire's batting lineup which also included the prized scalps of his fellow South African Barry Richards and West Indian opener Gordon Greenidge.

As captain, he led Gloucestershire to the Benson & Hedges Cup in 1977, as director of coaching he guided Northamptonshire CCC to victory in the 1989–90 NatWest Trophy final, and in 1994, he was coach as Kepler Wessels' South African team defeated England at Lord's by 356 runs. As a player Procter had beaten England there in 1970 with the Rest of the World XI and won the Gillette Cup for Gloucestershire in 1973, scoring 94 and taking two wickets against Sussex.

Completed Test career bowling averages (Note: Qualification: 10 wickets, career completed.)
Bowler	Average
Charles Marriott (ENG)	8.72
Frederick Martin (ENG)	10.07
George Lohmann (ENG)	10.75
Laurie Nash (AUS)	12.60
John Ferris (AUS/ENG)	12.70
Tom Horan (AUS)	13.00
Harry Dean (ENG)	13.90
Albert Trott (AUS/ENG)	15.00
Mike Procter (SA)	15.02
Jack Iverson (AUS)	15.23
Tom Kendall (AUS)	15.35
Alec Hurwood (AUS)	15.45
Billy Barnes (ENG)	15.54
John Trim (WI)	16.16
Billy Bates (ENG)	16.42

"I never really bothered much about averages, I was more concerned with how the team did, so to never lose a big game at Lord's was a highlight, plus there was winning all the Super Tests in Australia during World Series Cricket and all those Currie Cups with Natal", Procter told Cricinfo. "And, of course, winning all those Test matches in South Africa against the Aussies."

=== Style ===
As a bowler, Procter had an awkward chest-on action, seeming to bowl off the wrong foot (though not actually doing so) at the end of an intimidating run. His unusual action generated late inswing that, in the right conditions, could at times be unplayable. He bowled at high pace in his prime but later in his career knee problems caused by the impact of his bull-like body on the bowling crease forced him to turn to off-spin, which he mastered. He had a fearsome bouncer in his repertoire and he also possessed the skill of swinging the ball late.

His muscular batting in the middle order was famed for its power, although based on a sound defence. He was described by Wisden as "One of the rare cricketers who could have found a place in any test team as either a batsman or bowler and who could win a game single-handed with bat or ball in his hand".

== Post-retirement involvement in cricket ==
After retiring, Procter was director of cricket for the Free State and Natal provinces in South Africa, as well as Northamptonshire county. He was then appointed as the first post-isolation coach of the South African cricket team, and was the coach for tours of India (in 1991), the West Indies (which included South Africa's first post-isolation test, Sri Lanka and Australia. He also coached South Africa to their first ever Cricket World Cup campaign in 1992, where South Africa caught the attention of everyone by reaching the semi-finals before agonizingly losing to England in a heart-breaking fashion due to broadcasters' costly error.

=== Commentating ===
He also served as an international cricket commentator, and one of his most memorable moments as a commentator came during the epic semi-final played between Australia and South Africa during the 1999 Cricket World Cup, which ended in a dramatic fashion with scores tied, albeit with a clumsy run of South African tailender Allan Donald. Procter and Bill Lawry were standing up in the commentary box during the critical juncture of the match when Procter exclaimed: "What kind of shot is that? First two deliveries of this over have gone bang, bang, four, four. Take that, scores are level".

=== Match referee ===
Procter was involved in several controversial incidents in his career as a match referee. He refereed the forfeited Oval Test of August 2006 when Pakistan refused to take the field after tea in protest at the umpires' decision to penalise them for ball tampering. During the second test match of the 2007–2008 Indian tour of Australia, Procter banned Harbhajan Singh for three matches on charges of racism. This decision was later overturned by Justice Hansen. At the first hearing Procter established that neither the umpire, nor Ricky Ponting, nor Sachin Tendulkar, who was closest to the incident, had heard anything. At the second hearing, however, Justice Hansen uncovered that Tendulkar heard the heated exchange between Andrew Symonds and Harbhajan including the exact Hindi phrase, and Ponting 'couldn't understand why Sachin didn't tell this to Mike Procter in the first place.' Procter had been criticised for his original decision and Sunil Gavaskar questioned whether his sympathies lay with the Australian team due to his race.

=== S.A. Selection Board ===
He was appointed chairman of selectors of South Africa men's national cricket team in December 2008 by Cricket South Africa. The entire selection board (including Procter's position as chairman of selectors) which was appointed in December 2008 was sacked by Cricket South Africa in 2010 following a poor string of performances from South African team in international cricket.

== Charity ==
In 2014, Procter also set up a charity in South Africa by using his own name, the Mike Procter Foundation. The Mike Procter Foundation began focusing on transforming the lives of children through sports. Procter went on to register his charity in the UK in 2018 with the ambition of providing cricket coaching to underprivileged and vulnerable children.

== Death ==
On 12 February 2024, Procter was admitted to the intensive care unit at Busamed Gateway Private Hospital in uMhlanga following a cardiac arrest. It was revealed that his health condition began to deteriorate and his situation became complicated during a routine surgery. He died in uMhlanga on 17 February 2024, at the age of 77, of cardiac arrest due to complications during heart surgery.

== Legacy ==
Gloucestershire revealed that the club's flag would be lowered to half-mast as a mark of respect to Procter until the start of the County Championship season, which was scheduled to begin on 5 April 2024. His former teammate David Graveney at Gloucestershire revealed that Procter, throughout his playing career, played with great pain in his knee.

Procter revealed that he admired former England captain Mike Brearley, especially for his captaincy skills. Later, Procter understood that Brearley himself considered Procter to be one of his favourite captains.
