= New Zealand cricket team in Australia in 1973–74 =

International cricket tour

	Australia	New Zealand
- Dates: 30 November 1973 – 3 February 1974
Captains	Ian Chappell	Bevan Congdon

Test series
- Result: Australia won the 3-match series 2–0
Most runs	Doug Walters (214)	John Morrison (249)
Most wickets	Kerry O'Keefe (11)	Dayle Hadlee (8)

The New Zealand national cricket team toured Australia in the 1973-74 season and played 3 Test matches. Australia won the series 2-0 with one match drawn. It was followed by a reciprocal visit by Australia to New Zealand in March 1974; the 3 test series was drawn 1-1.

== New Zealand team ==
- Bevan Congdon (captain)
- Glenn Turner (vice-captain)
- Gren Alabaster
- Bryan Andrews
- Lance Cairns
- Keith Campbell
- Jeremy Coney
- Dayle Hadlee
- Richard Hadlee
- Brian Hastings
- John Morrison
- David O'Sullivan
- John Parker
- Mike Shrimpton
- Ken Wadsworth

Coney joined the tour when Turner was injured. Andrews, Cairns, Coney and Morrison made their Test debuts on the tour. Alabaster and Campbell never played Test cricket.

== Test series summary ==
=== First Test ===
29 December 1973–2 January 1974
(5-day match)
Scorecard

Australia	v	New Zealand
462/8d (101.5 overs); Keith Stackpole 122 (192); Dayle Hadlee 4/102 (20 overs)		237 (79.7 overs); Ken Wadsworth 80 (126); Gary Gilmour 4/75 (22 overs)
		200 (f/o) (81.6 overs); Dayle Hadlee 37 (123); Ashley Mallett 4/63 (24 overs)

Australia won by an innings and 25 runs
Melbourne Cricket Ground, Melbourne
Umpires: Ton Brooks and Jack Collins

- Australia won the toss and elected to bat.
- 31 December was taken as a rest day.
- The match was scheduled for five days but completed in four.
- Ian Davis and Gary Gilmour (both AUS), and Bryan Andrews and John Morrison (both NZ) made their Test debuts.

=== Second Test ===
5–10 January 1974
(5-day match)
Scorecard

New Zealand	v	Australia
312 (86.6 overs); John Parker 108 (220); Doug Walters 4/39 (11 overs)		162 (44.4 overs); Ian Chappell 45 (103); Richard Hadlee 4/33 (9.4 overs)
305/9d (75.2 overs); John Morrison 117 (247); Greg Chappell 3/54 (16 overs)		30/2 (8.3 overs); Paul Sheahan 14* (27); Richard Hadlee 2/16 (4.3 overs)

Match drawn
Sydney Cricket Ground, Sydney
Umpires: Peter Enright and Max O'Connell

- Australia won the toss and elected to field.
- 8 January was taken as a rest day.
- There was no play on the third and final days.
- Jeremy Coney (NZ) made his Test debut.

=== Third Test ===
26–31 January 1974
(5-day match)
Scorecard

Australia	v	New Zealand
477 (120.5 overs); Rod Marsh 132 (266); David O'Sullivan 5/148 (35.5 overs)		218 (87.3 overs); Ken Wadsworth 48 (107); Kerry O'Keeffe 3/55 (24.3 overs)
		202 (f/o) (89.5 overs); Bevan Congdon 71* (297); Geoff Dymock 5/58 (27 overs)

Australia won by an innings and 57 runs
Adelaide Oval, Adelaide
Umpires: JR Collins and PR Enright

- Australia won the toss and elected to bat.
- 29 January was taken as a rest day.
- There was no play on the fourth day.
- Geoff Dymock, Alan Hurst and Ashley Woodcock (all AUS), and Lance Cairns (NZ) made their Test debuts.

== Tour matches summary ==
30 November-3 December 1973
(4-day match)
Scorecard

Victoria	v	New Zealand
262/7d (71.5 overs); Robert Rose 67; Richard Hadlee 3/61 (14 overs)		308 (80.6 overs); Bevan Congdon 113; Alan Hurst 4/73 (16.6 overs)
324/8d (82 overs); Richie Robinson 99; Lance Cairns 3/76 (21 overs)		160/5 (52 overs); Mike Shrimpton 53*; Alan Hurst 2/27 (6 overs)

Match drawn
Melbourne Cricket Ground, Melbourne
Umpires: Jack Collins and Bill Copeland

- New Zealand won the toss and decided to field

5 December 1973
(40-over match)
Scorecard

Newcastle; 125 (37.4 overs)	v	New Zealand; 126/5 (34 overs)
Charlie Baker 47; Gren Alabaster 2/10 (8 overs)		Bevan Congdon 33*; George R. Claridge 1/20 (7 overs)

New Zealand won by 5 wickets
Newcastle Number 1 Sports Ground, Newcastle
Umpires: R Porcheron and J Smith

- Newcastle won the toss and decided to bat

7-11 December 1973
(4-day match)
Scorecard

New Zealand	v	New South Wales
400/7d (87 overs); John Parker 130; Gary Gilmour 4/102 (27 overs)		367 (85.4 overs); Rick McCosker 83; Dayle Hadlee 4/104 (21 overs)
175 (63.2 overs); Richard Hadlee 37; Kerry O'Keeffe 4/57 (23 overs)		212/3 (39.2 overs); Doug Walters 79*; Richard Hadlee 1/26 (8 overs)

New South Wales won by 7 wickets
Sydney Cricket Ground, Sydney
Umpires: Ton Brooks and Reg Ledwidge

- New Zealanders won the toss and decided to bat
- 9 December was taken as a rest day

14-15 December 1973
(4-day match)
Scorecard

New Zealand	v	Queensland
100 (30.2 overs); Lance Cairns 29; Tony Dell 6/40 (14.2 overs)		263 (47 overs); Greg Chappell 165; Bryan Andrews 5/85 (18 overs)
161 (50.1 overs); Jeremy Coney 64*; Tony Dell 6/23 (11.1 overs)

Queensland won by an innings and 2 runs
The Gabba, Brisbane
Umpires: Peter Enright and Donald Lancashire

- Queensland won the toss and decided to field

16 December 1973
(40-over match)
Scorecard

Queensland; 274/6 (40 overs)	v	New Zealand; 203 (33.7 overs)
Phil Carlson 89 (79); Lance Cairns 2/43 (8 overs)		Brian Hastings 44 (45); Phil Carlson 5/25 (8 overs)

Queensland won by 71 runs
The Gabba, Brisbane
Umpires: Peter Enright and Donald Lancashire
Player of the match: Phil Carlson

- Queensland won the toss and decided to bat

19 December 1973
(40-over match)
Scorecard

New Zealand; 213 (38.2 overs)	v	Australian Capital Territory; 135/9 (40 overs)
Bevan Congdon 63; Brian Lloyd 3/145 (2.2 overs)		John McMurtrie 30; David O'Sullivan 3/19 (7 overs)

New Zealand won by 78 runs
Manuka Oval, Canberra
Umpires: G.R. Bennett and Sidney V. Smith

- Australian Capital Territory won the toss and decided to field

21-24 December 1973
(4-day match)
Scorecard

New Zealand	v	South Australia
274 (74.6 overs); Brian Hastings 92; Ashley Mallett 6/77 (26.6 overs)		290 (57.3 overs); Jeffrey Barnes 88; Lance Cairns 5/55 (11 overs)
242 (76 overs); Mike Shrimpton 106; Jeffrey Barnes 4/42 (15 overs)		230/5 (62.6 overs); Jack Nash 87*; Richard Hadlee 2/59 (15 overs)

South Australia won by 5 wickets
Adelaide Oval, Adelaide
Umpires: Robin Bailhache and Max O'Connell

- South Australia won the toss and decided to field

12-14 January 1974
(3-day match)
Scorecard

New Zealand	v	Tasmania
216 (51.3 overs); Ken Wadsworth 44; Leslie Appleton 4/61 (17 overs)		178 (53.6 overs); Jim Wilkinson 49; Dayle Hadlee 4/52 (18 overs)
221/4d (52 overs); Glenn Turner 106*; Gary Whitney 1/31 (4 overs)		165 (54.1 overs); Kenneth Thomson 35; David O'Sullivan 4/49 (189 overs)

New Zealand won by 94 runs
NTCA Ground, Launceston
Umpires: J.L. Corrick and Michael Hull

- New Zealand won the toss and decided to bat

15-16 January 1974
(2-day match)
Scorecard

Tasmania	v	New Zealand
206/4d (58 overs); Bruce Doolan 77; Lance Cairns 3/35 (9 overs)		94/2d (21 overs); John Parker 32; Leslie Appleton 2/15 (6 overs)
157/4d (25 overs); Bruce Doolan 52; Gren Alabaster 2/32 (7 overs)		270/6 (40.6 overs); Glenn Turner 101; Sadiq Mohammad 4/55 (12 overs)

New Zealand won by 4 wickets
TCA Ground, Hobart
Umpires: L.W. Cox and James M. Stevens

- New Zealand won the toss and decided to field

19-22 January 1974
(4-day match)
Scorecard

Western Australia	v	New Zealand
397/7d (82.6 overs); Ian Brayshaw 160; Bevan Congdon 4/52 (12.6 overs)		381/6d (90 overs); Brian Hastings 139*; Jim Hubble 2/70 (16 overs)
271/5d (63 overs); Wally Edwards 67; Gren Alabaster 2/88 (23 overs)		288/6 (48.6 overs); John Parker 140*; Graeme Watson 2/28 (5 overs)

New Zealand won by 4 wickets
WACA Ground, Perth
Umpires: James D'Arcy-Evans and Donald L. Hawks

- Western Australia won the toss and decided to bat

2 February 1974
(40-over match)
Scorecard

South Australia; 217 (39.5 overs)	v	New Zealand; 177 (37.5 overs)
Glenn Turner 47; Terry Jenner 3/33 (8 overs)		Barry Causby 67; Richard Hadlee 3/30 (6.5 overs)

New Zealand won by 40 runs
Adelaide Oval, Adelaide
Umpires: Robin Bailhache and Max O'Connell
Player of the match: Terry Jenner

- South Australia won the toss and decided to field

3 February 1974
(40-over match)
Scorecard

New Zealand; 150 (36.3 overs)	v	Western Australia; 151/3 (26.6 overs)
John Morrison 50; Graham McKenzie 3/20 (8 overs)		Wally Edwards 54; Bevan Congdon 2/31 (8 overs)

Western Australia won by 7 wickets
Melbourne Cricket Ground, Melbourne
Umpires: Jack Collins and Bill Copeland
Player of the match: Graham McKenzie

- Western Australia won the toss and decided to field

== Annual reviews ==
- Playfair Cricket Annual 1974
- Wisden Cricketers' Almanack 1975
