= 1980–81 Australia Tri-Nation Series =

1980–81 World Series
- Date: 23 November 1980 – 3 February 1981
- Location: Australia
- Result: Won by Australia; 3–1 in final series
Teams
Australia	India	New Zealand
Captains
Greg Chappell	Sunil Gavaskar	Geoff Howarth
Most runs
Greg Chappell (686)	Dilip Vengsarkar (221)	John Wright (511)
Most wickets
Dennis Lillee (25)	Dilip Doshi (15)	Martin Snedden (17)

The 1980–81 Australia Tri-Nation Series (more commonly known as the 1980–81 World Series) was a cricket tournament held in Australia from 23 November 1980 to 3 February 1981. It was the second edition of the Australian Tri-Series, with Australia playing host to India and New Zealand. The series was a part of the Indian and New Zealand tours.

After matches were played in Adelaide, Brisbane, Melbourne, Sydney and Perth throughout the entire group-stage, Australia and New Zealand qualified for the finals where after the underarm incident in the third final, Australia went on to win 3–1.

== Uniforms ==
Australia
Australia Kit

India
India Kit

New Zealand
New Zealand Kit

== Points Table ==
Team	P	W	L	T	NR	Pts	RR
Australia	10	6	3	0	1	13	4.259
New Zealand	10	5	4	0	1	11	4.109
India	10	3	7	0	0	6	3.947

== Fixtures ==
23 November 1980
Scorecard

Australia; 217/9 (50 overs)	v	New Zealand; 219/7 (49.1 overs)
John Dyson 69 (120); Ewen Chatfield 5/34 (10 overs)		John Wright 60 (128); Dennis Lillee 3/40 (10 overs)

New Zealand won by 3 wickets
Adelaide Oval, Adelaide
Umpires: Tony Crafter (Aus) and Peter Cronin (Aus)
Player of the match: Ewen Chatfield (NZ)

- New Zealand won the toss and elected to field.
- Shaun Graf, Trevor Chappell, Geoff Lawson (Aus) and Martin Snedden (NZ) all made their ODI debuts.

25 November 1980
Scorecard

Australia; 289/3 (50 overs)	v	New Zealand; 195 (42.5 overs)
Greg Chappell 138* (109); Paul McEwan 1/51 (10 overs)		Geoff Howarth 46 (76); Len Pascoe 5/30 (7.5 overs)

Australia won by 94 runs
Sydney Cricket Ground, Sydney
Umpires: Robin Bailhache (Aus) and Mel Johnson (Aus)
Player of the match: Greg Chappell (Aus)

- Australia won the toss and elected to bat.
- Ian Smith (NZ) made his ODI debut.

6 December 1980
Scorecard

India; 208/9 (49 overs)	v	Australia; 142 (42.1 overs)
Sandeep Patil 64 (70); Dennis Lillee 2/22 (7 overs)		Kim Hughes 35 (53); Dilip Doshi 3/32 (10 overs)

India won by 66 runs
Melbourne Cricket Ground, Melbourne
Umpires: Max O'Connell (Aus) and Rex Whitehead (Aus)
Player of the match: Sandeep Patil (Ind)

- Australia won the toss and elected to field.
- Tirumalai Srinivasan, Kirti Azad, Sandeep Patil, Roger Binny and Dilip Doshi (Ind) all made their ODI debuts.

7 December 1980
Scorecard

New Zealand; 156 (49.5 overs)	v	Australia; 159/6 (47.2 overs)
John Wright 57 (119); Len Pascoe 4/37 (9.5 overs)		Greg Chappell 48 (70); Stephen Boock 2/30 (10 overs)

Australia won by 4 wickets
Melbourne Cricket Ground, Melbourne
Umpires: Dick French (Aus) and Robin Bailhache (Aus)
Player of the match: Allan Border (Aus)

- New Zealand won the toss and elected to bat.

9 December 1980
Scorecard

India; 162 (47.4 overs)	v	New Zealand; 157 (49.5 overs)
Sandeep Patil 39 (73); Richard Hadlee 5/32 (9 overs)		Paul McEwan 41 (76); Roger Binny 4/41 (9.5 overs)

India won by 5 runs
WACA Ground, Perth
Umpires: Tony Crafter (Aus) and Donald Weser (Aus)
Player of the match: Richard Hadlee (NZ)

- India won the toss and elected to bat.

18 December 1980 (D/N)
Scorecard

India; 180/9 (49 overs)	v	Australia; 183/1 (42.2 overs)
Gundappa Viswanath 43 (80); Shaun Graf 2/23 (10 overs)		Allan Border 105* (122); Kapil Dev 1/27 (8 overs)

Australia won by 9 wickets
Sydney Cricket Ground, Sydney
Umpires: Dick French (Aus) and Rex Whitehead (Aus)
Player of the match: Allan Border (Aus)

- Australia won the toss and elected to field.

21 December 1980
Scorecard

India; 204 (48.5 overs)	v	New Zealand; 205/7 (48.4 overs)
Kapil Dev 75 (51); Gary Troup 4/19 (9 overs)		Jeremy Coney 47* (52); Dilip Doshi 4/30 (10 overs)

New Zealand won by 3 wickets
The Gabba, Brisbane
Umpires: Dick French (Aus) and Mel Johnson (Aus)
Player of the match: Kapil Dev (Ind)

- India won the toss and elected to bat.
- Yograj Singh (Ind) made his ODI debut.

23 December 1980
Scorecard

India; 230/7 (50 overs)	v	New Zealand; 224 (49.3 overs)
Yashpal Sharma 72 (105); Martin Snedden 3/30 (10 overs)		Jeremy Coney 49* (63); Dilip Doshi 2/34 (10 overs); Kapil Dev 2/34 (9.3 overs)

India won by 6 runs
Adelaide Oval, Adelaide
Umpires: Tony Crafter (Aus) and Max O'Connell (Aus)
Player of the match: Yashpal Sharma (Ind)

- India won the toss and elected to bat.

8 January 1981
Scorecard

India; 63 (25.5 overs)	v	Australia; 64/1 (21 overs)
Gundappa Viswanath 23 (22); Greg Chappell 5/15 (9.5 overs)		Greg Chappell 33* (48); Kapil Dev 1/15 (9 overs)

Australia won by 9 wickets
Sydney Cricket Ground, Sydney
Umpires: Max O'Connell (Aus) and Donald Weser (Aus)
Player of the match: Greg Chappell (Aus)

- Australia won the toss and elected to field.

10 January 1981
Scorecard

India; 112/9 (34 overs)	v	New Zealand; 113/0 (29 overs)
Gundappa Viswanath 33 (52); Martin Snedden 2/16 (5 overs)		Bruce Edgar 65* (89)

New Zealand won by 10 wickets
Melbourne Cricket Ground, Melbourne
Umpires: Robin Bailhache (Aus) and Rex Whitehead (Aus)
Player of the match: Bruce Edgar (NZ)

- New Zealand won the toss and elected to field.
- Match was reduced to 34 overs per side due to rain.

11 January 1981
Scorecard

India; 192/5 (50 overs)	v	Australia; 193/3 (47.2 overs)
Sunil Gavaskar 80 (142); Greg Chappell 2/23 (10 overs)		Graeme Wood 98* (155); Dilip Doshi 1/38 (10 overs)

Australia won by 7 wickets
Melbourne Cricket Ground, Melbourne
Umpires: Dick French (Aus) and Peter Cronin (Aus)
Player of the match: Graeme Wood (Aus)

- Australia won the toss and elected to field.

13 January 1981
Scorecard

New Zealand; 220/8 (50 overs)	v	Australia; 219/7 (50 overs)
John Wright 78 (135); Len Pascoe 3/37 (10 overs)		Doug Walters 50* (72); Ewen Chatfield 1/26 (10 overs)

New Zealand won by 1 run
Sydney Cricket Ground, Sydney
Umpires: Donald Weser (Aus) and Mel Johnson (Aus)
Player of the match: John Wright (NZ)

- New Zealand won the toss and elected to bat.

15 January 1981
Scorecard

Australia; 242/8 (50 overs)	v	India; 215/8 (50 overs)
Allan Border 85 (131); Sandeep Patil 2/34 (10 overs)		Dilip Vengsarkar 52 (74); Dennis Lillee 4/32 (10 overs)

Australia won by 27 runs
Sydney Cricket Ground, Sydney
Umpires: Donald Weser (Aus) and Rex Whitehead (Aus)
Player of the match: Allan Border (Aus)

- India won the toss and elected to field.

18 January 1981
Scorecard

New Zealand; 242/9 (50 overs)	v	India; 220 (48.1 overs)
Jeremy Coney 49 (58); Kapil Dev 3/37 (10 overs)		Dilip Vengsarkar 66 (77); Jeremy Coney 3/28 (10 overs)

New Zealand won by 22 runs
The Gabba, Brisbane
Umpires: Peter Cronin (Aus) and Mel Johnson (Aus)
Player of the match: Jeremy Coney (NZ)

- India won the toss and elected to field.

21 January 1981
Scorecard

Australia; 180 (43.1 overs)	v	New Zealand; 23/1 (8 overs)
Greg Chappell 74 (80); Paul McEwan 2/29 (5 overs)		John Wright 8 (33); Greg Chappell 1/1 (1 over)

No result
Sydney Cricket Ground, Sydney
Umpires: Dick French (Aus) and Max O'Connell (Aus)

- Australia won the toss and elected to bat.
- Rain during New Zealand's innings prevented any further play.

== Final series ==
=== 1st Final ===
29 January 1981 (D/N)
Scorecard

New Zealand; 233/6 (50 overs)	v	Australia; 155 (39.3 overs)
John Wright 81 (111); Dennis Lillee 2/47 (10 overs)		Allan Border 55 (74); Richard Hadlee 5/26 (8.3 overs)

New Zealand won by 78 runs
Sydney Cricket Ground, Sydney
Umpires: Robin Bailhache (Aus) and Mel Johnson (Aus)

- Australia won the toss and elected to field.
- Martin Kent (Aus) made his ODI debut.

=== 2nd Final ===
31 January 1981
Scorecard

New Zealand; 126 (46.4 overs)	v	Australia; 130/3 (39.3 overs)
Bruce Edgar 28 (56); Graeme Beard 2/20 (8.4 overs)		Greg Chappell 58* (87); Geoff Howarth 1/13 (4 overs)

Australia won by 7 wickets
Melbourne Cricket Ground, Melbourne
Umpires: Dick French (Aus) and Donald Weser (Aus)

- Australia won the toss and elected to field.
- Graeme Beard (Aus) made his ODI debut.

=== 3rd Final ===
1 February 1981
Scorecard

Australia; 235/4 (50 overs)	v	New Zealand; 229/8 (50 overs)
Greg Chappell 90 (122); Martin Snedden 2/52 (10 overs)		Bruce Edgar 102* (141); Greg Chappell 3/43 (10 overs)

Australia won by 6 runs
Melbourne Cricket Ground, Melbourne
Umpires: Peter Cronin (Aus) and Donald Weser (Aus)

- Australia won the toss and elected to bat.
- The match concluded with a controversial underarm delivery.

=== 4th Final ===
3 February 1981 (D/N)
Scorecard

New Zealand; 215/8 (50 overs)	v	Australia; 218/4 (47.4 overs)
John Wright 57 (88); Dennis Lillee 3/27 (10 overs)		Greg Chappell 87 (102); Martin Snedden 3/27 (9 overs)

Australia won by 6 wickets
Sydney Cricket Ground, Sydney
Umpires: Tony Crafter (Aus) and Robin Bailhache (Aus)
Player of the match: Greg Chappell (Aus)

- New Zealand won the toss and elected to bat.
- With the result of this match, Australia won the 1980-81 Benson & Hedges World Series Cup.
