= West Indian cricket team in Australia in 1979–80 =

International cricket tour

Frank Worrell Trophy 1979-80
- Date: November 1979 –January 1980
- Location: Australia
- Result: West Indies won the 3-test series 2-0
Teams
- Australia: West Indies
Captains
- (Australia) Greg Chappell: (Cricket West Indies) Deryck Murray (First test); Clive Lloyd (Second and Third test)
Most runs
- Bruce Laird (340 at 56.67) Greg Chappell (270 at 45.00) Kim Hughes (252 at 50.04): Viv Richards (396 at 96.50); Alvin Kallicharran (202 at 50.40); Gordon Greenidge (173 at 34.60)
Most wickets
- Dennis Lillee (12) Geoff Dymock (11): Colin Croft (16); Joel Garner (14)

The West Indies cricket team toured Australia from November 1979 to January 1980 and played a three-match Test series against the Australia national cricket team. The West Indies won the Test series 2–0, retaining the Frank Worrell Trophy.

The series was notable for several major events in cricket history. It was the first Australian season after the rapprochement between the Australian Cricket Board and Kerry Packer's World Series Cricket. This was the first time that West Indies played their original "fearsome foursome" of fast bowlers, consisting of Andy Roberts, Michael Holding, Joel Garner and Colin Croft, in an official Test match. It was also notable for Viv Richards' dominant batting display of 396 runs in 4 innings at an average of 96.50, with a lowest score of 74. His overall aggregate in that tour in international matches was of 881 runs at an astonishing batting average of 97.88. Richards' performance was rated by Australian media as one of the finest ever in Australia. Richards' performance was even more remarkable considering that he was suffering from groin, leg and back injuries throughout the tour. Wisden described Richards' batting as follows:

Very few individuals have so dominated a season as Viv Richards did this one against quality bowling line up. He gathered his runs with the command and range of strokes of the truly great batsmen, scoring freely against bowling of every type. That he has suffering at the time from groin and back trouble so acute that he was often forced to limp painfully emphasised the extraordinary nature of his performance.

— Wisden Cricketers' Almanack (1981)

West Indies won their first Test series on Australian soil. It also marked the beginning of West Indies' dominance in world cricket, as they remained unbeaten for the next 15 years (1980-1995) until eventually losing to Mark Taylor's Australia in 1995.

The scheduling of the Test matches was unusual, in that Australia alternated between playing Tests against West Indies and against England. This format was not repeated in subsequent years when two teams toured Australia in the same season.

In addition to the Test series, the teams played in a triangular Limited Overs International tournament, the "World Series Cup", which also involved the England team. West Indies won this tournament, defeating England in the final.

== Squads ==
Tests
Australia	West Indies
Greg Chappell (c); Rodney Marsh (wk); Bruce Laird; Kim Hughes; Ian Chappell; Ray Bright; Julien Wiener; David Hookes; Allan Border; Dennis Lillee; Jeff Thomson; Geoff Dymock; Rodney Hogg; Len Pascoe; Ashley Mallett; Rick McCosker	Clive Lloyd (c); Deryck Murray (wk); Gordon Greenidge; Desmond Haynes; Vivian Richards; Alvin Kallicharran; Lawrence Rowe; Larry Gomes; Collis King; Derick Parry; Andy Roberts; Michael Holding; Joel Garner; Colin Croft; Malcolm Marshall

== Tour Matches ==
16–18 November 1979
(3-day match)
Scorecard

South Australia	v	West Indians
202 (42.3 overs); Rick Darling 88; Michael Holding 4/27 (14 overs)		397 (109.3 overs); Deryck Murray 103; Rodney Hogg 6/95 (27 overs)
233 (71.3 overs); David Hookes 67; Andy Roberts 4/25 (10.3 overs)		42/1 (10.4 overs); Desmond Haynes 18*; Jeff Hammond 1/14 (3 overs)

West Indians won by 9 wickets
Adelaide Oval
Umpires: Max O'Connell (Aus) and Tony Crafter (Aus)

- West Indians won the toss and elected to bowl.

23–25 November 1979
(3-day match)
Scorecard

West Indians	v	Tasmania Invitation XI
374/10 (147 overs); Vivian Richards 127; Phillip Blizzard 3/65 (16 overs)		144/10 (57.3 overs); Robert Knight 33; Colin Croft 5/49 (19.3 overs)
202/4 (59 overs); Larry Gomes 64; Phillip Blizzard 2/32 (11 overs)		172/10 (50.2 overs); Robert Knight 57; Joel Garner 4/59 (14 overs)

West Indians won by 260 runs
Devonport Oval
Umpires: Robert Marshall (Aus)

- Tasmania Invitation XI won the toss and elected to bowl first

5–7 January 1980
(4-day match)
Scorecard

West Indians	v	Western Australia
169/10 (55.2 overs); Derick Parry 32; Terry Alderman 5/47 (18 overs)		396/6 (dec) (88 overs); Robbie Langer 137; Malcolm Marshall 3/66 (18 overs)
313/10 (84 overs); Collis King 92; Terry Alderman 3/86 (24 overs)		87/2 (26 overs); Greg Shipperd; Malcolm Marshall 1/21 (9 overs)

Western Australia won by 8 wickets
W.A.C.A. Ground, Perth
Umpires: James D'Arcy-Evans (Aus) and Donald Weser (Aus)

- Western Australia won the toss and elected to field first

== Test series ==
=== First Test ===
1–5 December 1979
(5-day match)
Scorecard

Australia	v	West Indies
268 (86.1 overs); BM Laird 92 (185); J Garner 4/55 (22 overs)		441 (132.1 overs); IVA Richards 140 (259); DK Lillee 4/104 (29.1 overs)
448/6d (166 overs); KJ Hughes 130* (244); J Garner 2/75 (41 overs)		40/3 (14 overs); AI Kallicharran 10* (32); RM Hogg 2/11 (5 overs)

Match drawn
Brisbane Cricket Ground, Woolloongabba, Brisbane
Umpires: RC Bailhache and AR Crafter
Player of the match: IVA Richards (WIN)

- West Indies won the toss and elected to field.
- BM Laird (AUS) made his Test debut.

=== Second Test ===
29 December 1979–1 January 1980
(5-day match)
Scorecard

Australia	v	West Indies
156 (56.3 overs); JM Wiener 40 (90); MA Holding 4/40 (14 overs)		397 (112.4 overs); IVA Richards 96 (110); G Dymock 4/106 (31 overs)
259 (86.4 overs); KJ Hughes 70 (102); CEH Croft 3/61 (22 overs)		22/0 (7.2 overs); CG Greenidge 9* (21); DL Haynes 9* (24)

West Indies won by 10 wickets
Melbourne Cricket Ground, Melbourne
Umpires: AR Crafter and CE Harvey
Player of the match: IVA Richards (WIN)

- Australia won the toss and elected to bat.
- The match was scheduled for five days but completed in four.

=== Third Test ===
26–30 January 1980
(5-day match)
Scorecard

West Indies	v	Australia
328 (91.3 overs); CH Lloyd 121 (156); DK Lillee 5/78 (24 overs)		203 (73.5 overs); AR Border 54 (154); CEH Croft 4/57 (22 overs)
448 (126.5 overs); AI Kallicharran 106 (176); G Dymock 5/104 (33.5 overs)		165 (50 overs); BM Laird 36 (68); MA Holding 4/40 (13 overs)

West Indies won by 408 runs
Adelaide Oval, Adelaide
Umpires: MW Johnson and MG O'Connell
Player of the match: CH Lloyd (WIN)

- Australia won the toss and elected to field.

== Benson & Hedges World Series Cup ==
The Benson & Hedges World Series Cup was a tri-nation (ODI) series held in Australia from 27 November 1979 to 22 January 1980, between Australia, West Indies and England. The tournament was played in a round-robin format in which England and West Indies reached the finals, and West Indies won the matches 2–0.

Vivian Richards scored the most runs in the tournament with 485 runs (from 7 innings) at an average of 97.00, with his highest score coming against Australia where he scored 153* at the MCG. Dennis Lillee took the most wickets with 20 (in 8 innings) at an average of 12.70.
