= English cricket team in Australia in 1979–80 =

International cricket tour

The England national cricket team toured Australia from November 1979 to February 1980 and played a three-match Test series against the Australia national cricket team. Australia won the Test series 3–0. England were captained by Mike Brearley; Australia by Greg Chappell. The Ashes were not at stake. The first test was known for the ComBat incident, where Australian Dennis Lillee circumvented the Laws of cricket at the time by using an aluminium bat.

As part of the settlement between World Series Cricket and the Australian Cricket Board, this series was hastily arranged along with another involving Australia and the West Indies. The two Test series overlapped, with Australia alternating between playing the West Indies and England. This format was not repeated in subsequent years when two teams toured Australia in the same season, where one series would be completed before the next began.

In addition, the teams played in a triangular Limited Overs International (LOI) tournament which also involved the West Indies cricket team. The West Indies won this tournament, defeating England in the final.

== Test series summary ==
=== First Test ===
14–19 December 1979
(5-day match)
Scorecard

Australia	v	England
244 (100 overs); KJ Hughes 99 (195); IT Botham 6/78 (35 overs)		228 (91.1 overs); JM Brearley 64 (184); DK Lillee 4/73 (28 overs)
337 (141.5 overs); AR Border 115 (296); IT Botham 5/98 (45.5 overs)		215 (90.2 overs); G Boycott 99* (285); G Dymock 6/34 (17.2 overs)

Australia won by 138 runs
Western Australia Cricket Association Ground, Perth
Umpires: MG O'Connell and DG Weser
Player of the match: IT Botham (ENG)

- England won the toss and elected to field.
- 17 December was taken as a rest day.
- JM Wiener (AUS) and GR Dilley (ENG) made their Test debuts; Boycott carried his bat.

=== Second Test ===
4–8 January 1980
(5-day match)
Scorecard

England	v	Australia
123 (44.3 overs); IT Botham 27 (22); DK Lillee 4/40 (13.3 overs)		145 (58.2 overs); IM Chappell 42 (84); IT Botham 4/29 (17 overs)
237 (96.3 overs); DI Gower 98* (141); G Dymock 3/48 (28 overs)		219/4 (85.3 overs); GS Chappell 98* (202); DL Underwood 3/71 (26 overs)

Australia won by 6 wickets
Sydney Cricket Ground, Sydney
Umpires: RC Bailhache and WJ Copeland
Player of the match: GS Chappell (AUS)

- Australia won the toss and elected to field.
- 7 January was taken as a rest day.
- The match was scheduled for five days but completed in four.

=== Third Test ===
1–6 February 1980
(5-day match)
Scorecard

England	v	Australia
306 (128.1 overs); GA Gooch 99 (193); DK Lillee 6/60 (33.1 overs)		477 (179.5 overs); GS Chappell 114 (212); JK Lever 4/111 (53 overs)
273 (91.5 overs); IT Botham 119* (213); DK Lillee 5/78 (33 overs)		103/2 (38.4 overs); GS Chappell 40* (43); IT Botham 1/18 (12 overs)

Australia won by 8 wickets
Melbourne Cricket Ground, Melbourne
Umpires: RC Bailhache and PM Cronin
Player of the match: DK Lillee (AUS)

- England won the toss and elected to bat.
- 4 February was taken as a rest day.
- W Larkins (ENG) made his Test debut.
