= West Indian cricket team in Australia in 1975–76 =

International cricket tour

The Frank Worrell Trophy 1975-76
- Part of West Indian cricket team in Australia in 1975–76
- Date: 29 October 1975–5 February 1976
- Location: Australia
- Result: Australia won the 6-Test series 5-1
Teams
- Australia: West Indies
Captains
- Greg Chappell: Clive Lloyd
Most runs
- Greg Chappell (702): Clive Lloyd (469)
Most wickets
- Jeff Thomson (29): Andy Roberts (22)

The West Indies cricket team toured Australia in the 1975–76 season and played six Test matches and 1 ODI against Australia.

The test series was built up as an unofficial World Championship series for the title of best test team in the world. The West Indies came into the series after winning the inaugural 1975 World Cup, defeating Australia with several exciting young talents, most notably in Gordon Greenidge, Andy Roberts and Viv Richards. Australia won the first test in Brisbane at The Gabba convincingly by eight wickets but West Indies came back and defeated them in Perth at the WACA by an innings. However, Australia recovered and beat the West Indies in the remaining four tests, winning the series 5–1.

The series was a watershed event in West Indies cricketing history, thereafter adopting the formula of playing four out-and-out fast bowlers after witnessing at first-hand the destruction caused by Dennis Lillee and Jeff Thomson bowling close to 100 mph.

Gordon Greenidge, who went into the tour as an exciting young batter, struggled badly against Lillee and Thomson before eventually being dropped after suffering a lack of confidence. Therefore, Clive Lloyd opted to use Viv Richards as opener with Roy Fredericks in the final two tests. Despite getting good starts, Richards failed to capitalise in the first four tests, but whilst opening the batting in the final two tests, he scored two centuries and one fifty, ending the tour with 426 runs in 10 innings. This tour was also described as "the coming of age for Viv Richards", who went on to become the best batsman in the world and one of few positives for West Indies in a dreadful tour.

This was first test series for Greg Chappell as captain of Australia, succeeding his brother Ian Chappell. Chappell's winning captaincy debut was notable for a century in each innings, a unique feat, later matched by Virat Kohli of India in Australia in 2014. In the last test at the MCG, Lance Gibbs took his 308th test scalp, passing Fred Trueman.

== Test series summary ==
=== First Test ===
28 November – 2 December 1975
Scorecard

West Indies	v	Australia
214 (37.5 overs); DL Murray 66 (69); GJ Gilmour 4/42 (12 overs)		366 (106 overs); GS Chappell 123 (232); LR Gibbs 5/102 (38 overs)
370 (86.4 overs); LG Rowe 107 (235); DK Lillee 3/72 (16 overs)		219/2 (56.2 overs); GS Chappell 109* (172); AME Roberts 1/47 (14 overs)

Australia won by 8 wickets
The Gabba, Brisbane
Umpires: RC Bailhache and TF Brooks
Player of the match: GS Chappell (AUS)

- West Indies won the toss and elected to bat.
- 1 December was taken as a rest day.
- The match was scheduled for five days but completed in four.
- MA Holding (WIN) made his Test debut.

=== Second Test ===
12 – 16 December 1975
Scorecard

Australia	v	West Indies
329 (69.7 overs); IM Chappell 156 (261); MA Holding 4/88 (18.7 overs)		585 (95.4 overs); RC Fredericks 169 (145); JR Thomson 3/128 (17 overs)
169 (40.7 overs); GS Chappell 43 (109); AME Roberts 7/54 (14 overs)

West Indies won by an innings and 87 runs
WACA Ground, Perth
Umpires: RR Ledwidge and MG O'Connell
Player of the match: RC Fredericks (WIN)

- Australia won the toss and elected to bat.
- 15 December was taken as a rest day.
- The match was scheduled for five days but completed in four.

=== Third Test ===
26 – 30 December 1975
Scorecard

West Indies	v	Australia
224 (47 overs); RC Fredericks 59 (115); JR Thomson 5/62 (11 overs)		485 (118.3 overs); GJ Cosier 109 (186); AME Roberts 4/126 (32 overs)
312 (69.2 overs); CH Lloyd 102 (121); DK Lillee 3/70 (15 overs)		55/2 (8.7 overs); RB McCosker 22* (32); BD Julien 1/13 (3 overs)

Australia won by 8 wickets
Melbourne Cricket Ground, Melbourne
Umpires: RC Bailhache and JR Collins
Player of the match: JR Thomson (AUS)

- Australia won the toss and elected to field.
- 29 December was taken as a rest day.
- The match was scheduled for five days but completed in four.
- GJ Cosier (AUS) made his Test debut.

=== Fourth Test ===
3 – 7 January 1976
Scorecard

West Indies	v	Australia
355 (80.2 overs); LG Rowe 67 (172); MHN Walker 4/70 (21 overs)		405 (90.6 overs); GS Chappell 182* (274); MA Holding 3/79 (21 overs)
128 (39.3 overs); DL Murray 50 (106); JR Thomson 6/50 (15 overs)		82/3 (18.1 overs); IR Redpath 28 (50); AI Kallicharran 1/7 (2 overs)

Australia won by 7 wickets
Sydney Cricket Ground, Sydney
Umpires: TF Brooks and RR Ledwidge
Player of the match: GS Chappell (AUS)

- Australia won the toss and elected to field.
- 6 January was taken as a rest day.
- The match was scheduled for five days but completed in four.
- GN Yallop (AUS) made his Test debut.

=== Fifth Test ===
23 – 28 January 1976
Scorecard

Australia	v	West Indies
418 (88 overs); IR Redpath 103 (175); VA Holder 5/108 (21 overs)		274 (42.2 overs); KD Boyce 95* (105); JR Thomson 4/68 (11 overs)
345/7d (79.5 overs); A Turner 136 (222); LR Gibbs 3/106 (32.5 overs)		299 (63.4 overs); IVA Richards 101 (136); GJ Gilmour 3/44 (10.4 overs)

Australia won by 190 runs
Adelaide Oval, Adelaide
Umpires: TF Brooks and MG O'Connell
Player of the match: KD Boyce (WIN)

- Australia won the toss and elected to bat.
- 25 January was taken as a rest day.

=== Sixth Test ===
31 January – 5 February 1976
Scorecard

Australia	v	West Indies
351 (90.2 overs); IR Redpath 101 (230); KD Boyce 3/75 (17.2 overs)		160 (30.3 overs); IVA Richards 50 (54); GJ Gilmour 5/34 (10 overs)
300/3d (78 overs); RB McCosker 109* (267); KD Boyce 2/74 (19 overs)		326 (54.5 overs); IVA Richards 98 (103); JR Thomson 4/80 (12.5 overs)

Australia won by 165 runs
Melbourne Cricket Ground, Melbourne
Umpires: TF Brooks and MG O'Connell
Player of the match: IR Redpath (AUS)

- Australia won the toss and elected to bat.
- 3 February was taken as a rest day.

== Only ODI ==
Between the 2nd and 3rd Tests a 40 over ODI was played.

20 December 1975
Scorecard

West Indies; 224 (37.6 overs)	v	Australia; 225/5 (31.5 overs)
IVA Richards 74 (87); MHN Walker 4/19 (6.6 overs)		IM Chappell 63 (105); VA Holder 2/53 (7.5 overs)

Australia won by 5 wickets
Adelaide Oval, Adelaide
Umpires: RC Bailache and MG O'Connell
Player of the match: IM Chappell (AUS)

- Australia won the toss and elected to field.
- GJ Cosier (AUS) and LG Rowe (WIN) made their ODI debuts.

== Annual reviews ==
- Playfair Cricket Annual 1976
- Wisden Cricketers' Almanack 1976
