= Pakistani cricket team in Australia in 1976–77 =

International cricket tour

Pakistani cricket team in Australia in 1976-77
	Australia	Pakistan
- Dates: 24 December 1976 – 18 January 1977
Captains	Greg Chappell	Mushtaq Mohammad

Test series
- Result: 3-match series drawn 1–1
Most runs	Greg Chappell (343); Ian Davis (294)	Zaheer Abbas (343); Asif Iqbal (313)
Most wickets	Dennis Lillee (21)	Imran Khan (18)
- Player of the series: Greg Chappell

The Pakistani cricket team toured Australia in December 1976 to play three Test matches. The series was drawn 1-1. Pakistan won the final match of the series, which was their first Test victory in Australia.

During the first test of the series at Adelaide, Australian fast bowler Jeff Thomson collided with Alan Turner which resulted in a dislocated shoulder for Thommo. According to Several Cricket historians and cricketers from that era Thomson lost his lethal pace after the collision. Although he was still very quick but his Venomous speed was never the same after the incident. During the third test at the SCG, Imran Khan took Six-wicket haul in both innings of the test match resulting in victory for Pakistan. Khan's 12-Wicket haul in the match are best ever bowling figures by an Asian bowler on Australian soil till date.

Pakistan's win at Sydney is considered as a landmark event in their sporting history. The rise of Pakistan cricket in modern era is largely attributed to this victory.

== Test series summary ==
=== First Test ===
24–29 December 1976
Scorecard

Pakistan	v	Australia
272 (70.7 overs); Zaheer Abbas 85 (121); KJ O'Keeffe 3/42 (19 overs)		454 (119.4 overs); KD Walters 107 (244); Mushtaq Mohammad 4/58 (19.4 overs)
466 (132.7 overs); Asif Iqbal 152* (291); DK Lillee 5/163 (47.7 overs)		261/6 (73 overs); GS Chappell 70 (118); Iqbal Qasim 4/84 (30 overs)

Match drawn
Adelaide Oval, Adelaide
Umpires: RC Bailhache and MG O'Connell

- Pakistan won the toss and elected to bat.
- 25 December was taken as a rest day.
- Iqbal Qasim and Mudassar Nazar (both PAK) made their Test debuts.

=== Second Test ===
1–6 January 1977
Scorecard

Australia	v	Pakistan
517/8d (92.6 overs); GJ Cosier 168 (206); Iqbal Qasim 4/111 (21 overs)		333 (84.1 overs); Sadiq Mohammad 105 (262); DK Lillee 6/82 (23 overs)
315/8d (61.5 overs); RB McCosker 105 (178); Imran Khan 5/122 (25.5 overs)		151 (44.1 overs); Zaheer Abbas 58 (74); KJ O'Keeffe 4/38 (18.1 overs)

Australia won by 348 runs
Melbourne Cricket Ground, Melbourne
Umpires: TF Brooks and MG O'Connell

- Australia won the toss and elected to bat.
- 4 January was taken as a rest day.
- A batsman from each side scored a century and a duck - Rick McCosker (0 & 105) and Sadiq Mohammad (105 & 0).

=== Third Test ===
14–18 January 1977
Scorecard

Australia	v	Pakistan
211 (64.2 overs); GJ Cosier 50 (73); Imran Khan 6/102 (26 overs)		360 (82.3 overs); Asif Iqbal 120 (213); MHN Walker 4/112 (29 overs)
180 (41.7 overs); RW Marsh 41 (80); Imran Khan 6/63 (19.7 overs)		32/2 (7.2 overs); Majid Khan 26* (27); DK Lillee 2/24 (4 overs)

Pakistan won by 8 wickets
Sydney Cricket Ground, Sydney
Umpires: TF Brooks and RR Ledwidge

- Australia won the toss and elected to bat.
- 17 January was taken as a rest day.
- The match was scheduled for five days but completed in four.
- Haroon Rasheed made his Test debut.

== Annual reviews ==
- Playfair Cricket Annual 1977
- Wisden Cricketers' Almanack 1977

== External sources ==
- CricketArchive – tour summaries
