= New Zealand cricket team in Australia in 1980–81 =

International cricket tour

The New Zealand national cricket team toured Australia in the 1980–81 season and played 3 Test matches. Australia won the series 2–0 with one match drawn. This was followed by a one-day series, which included the match that featured the underarm incident.

== Test series summary ==
=== First Test ===
28–30 November 1980
(5-day match)
Scorecard

New Zealand	v	Australia
225 (70.1 overs); GP Howarth 65 (119); JD Higgs 4/59 (16.1 overs)		305 (115.5 overs); GM Wood 111 (229); BL Cairns 5/87 (38.5 overs)
142 (41.1 overs); BA Edgar 51 (88); RJ Hadlee 51* (57); DK Lillee 6/53 (15 overs)		63/0 (21.3 overs); GM Wood 32* (65)

Australia won by 10 wickets
Brisbane Cricket Ground, Woolloongabba, Brisbane
Umpires: RC Bailhache and MW Johnson
Player of the match: GM Wood (AUS)

- Australia won the toss and elected to field.
- The match was scheduled for five days but completed in three.
- GF Lawson (AUS), and JG Bracewell and IDS Smith (both NZ) made their Test debuts.

=== Second Test ===
12–14 December 1980
(5-day match)
Scorecard

New Zealand	v	Australia
196 (73.5 overs); JV Coney 71 (165); DK Lillee 5/63 (23.5 overs)		265 (81.1 overs); RW Marsh 91 (161); RJ Hadlee 5/87 (27 overs)
121 (48.1 overs); WK Lees 25* (55); JD Higgs 4/25 (8 overs)		55/2 (22.1 overs); J Dyson 25* (75); RJ Hadlee 2/20 (11.1 overs)

Australia won by 8 wickets
Western Australia Cricket Association Ground, Perth
Umpires: AR Crafter and DG Weser
Player of the match: RW Marsh (AUS)

- Australia won the toss and elected to field.
- The match was scheduled for five days but completed in three.

=== Third Test ===
26–30 December 1980
(5-day match)
Scorecard

Australia	v	New Zealand
321 (121.3 overs); KD Walters 107 (206); JV Coney 3/28 (12.3 overs)		317 (108.2 overs); GP Howarth 65 (124); RM Hogg 4/60 (26.2 overs)
188 (87.2 overs); GS Chappell 78 (221); RJ Hadlee 6/57 (27.2 overs)		128/6 (54 overs); JG Wright 44 (115); GS Chappell 2/7 (7 overs)

Match drawn
Melbourne Cricket Ground, Melbourne
Umpires: RC Bailhache and AR Crafter
Player of the match: RJ Hadlee (NZ)

- New Zealand won the toss and elected to field.

== External sources ==
- CricketArchive – tour summaries

== Annual reviews ==
- Playfair Cricket Annual 1981
- Wisden Cricketers' Almanack 1981
