= West Indian cricket team in Australia in 1981–82 =

International cricket tour

The West Indies cricket team toured Australia in the 1981–82 season and played three Test matches against Australia. The series was drawn 1–1 after Australia won the first Test, and West Indies the third. The second Test was drawn, The West Indies also played a series of first-class matches and competed in the 1981–82 World Series against Australia and Pakistan. Australia and West Indies reached the Finals, which West Indies won 3–1.

== Test series summary ==
=== First Test ===
26–30 December 1981
(5-day match)
Scorecard

Australia	v	West Indies
198 (68.1 overs); Kim Hughes 100* (200); Michael Holding 5/45 (17 overs)		201 (62.3 overs); Larry Gomes 55 (108); Dennis Lillee 7/83 (26.3 overs)
222 (82.3 overs); Allan Border 66 (136); Michael Holding 6/62 (21.3 overs)		161 (74.1 overs); Jeff Dujon 43 (163); Bruce Yardley 4/38 (21 overs)

Australia won by 58 runs
Melbourne Cricket Ground, Melbourne
Umpires: Robin Bailhache (Aus) and Tony Crafter (Aus)
Player of the match: Kim Hughes (Aus)

- Australia won the toss and elected to bat.
- Jeff Dujon (WIN) made his Test debut.
- Michael Holding (WI) took his eighth and ninth five-wicket haul in Tests, and his second ten-wicket haul in Tests.
- Official total attendance: 136,464

=== Second Test ===
2–6 January 1982
(5-day match)
Scorecard

West Indies	v	Australia
384 (116.2 overs); Larry Gomes 126 (253); Dennis Lillee 4/119 (39 overs)		267 (107 overs); Graeme Wood 63 (151); Michael Holding 5/64 (29 overs)
255 (78.4 overs); Clive Lloyd 57 (92); Bruce Yardley 7/98 (31.4 overs)		200/4 (102 overs); John Dyson 127* (320); Larry Gomes 2/20 (15 overs)

Match drawn
Sydney Cricket Ground, Sydney
Umpires: RA French and MW Johnson
Player of the match: B Yardley (AUS)

- West Indies won the toss and elected to bat.

=== Third Test ===
30 January–3 February 1982
(5-day match)
Scorecard

Australia	v	West Indies
238 (91 overs); Allan Border 78 (227); Michael Holding 5/72 (25 overs)		389 (109.4 overs); Larry Gomes 124* (273); Bruce Yardley 5/132 (40.5 overs)
386 (152 overs); Allan Border 126 (277); Joel Garner 5/56 (35 overs)		239/5 (61.1 overs); Clive Lloyd 77* (97); Len Pascoe 3/84 (22 overs)

West Indies won by 5 wickets
Adelaide Oval, Adelaide
Umpires: RC Bailhache and MW Johnson
Player of the match: AR Border (AUS)

- West Indies won the toss and elected to field.

== See also ==
- Frank Worrell Trophy
- 1981–82 Australia Tri-Nation Series

== External sources ==
- CricketArchive – tour summaries

== Annual reviews ==
- Playfair Cricket Annual 1982
- Wisden Cricketers' Almanack 1982
