= Indian cricket team in Australia in 1980–81 =

International cricket tour

- Date: 22 November 1980 – 11 February 1981
- Location: Australia
- Result: 3-match series drawn 1-1
- Player of the series: Dennis Lillee (Aus)
Teams
- Australia: India
Captains
- (Australia) Greg Chappell: (India) Sunil Gavaskar
Most runs
- Greg Chappell (368): Sandeep Patil (311)
Most wickets
- Dennis Lillee (21): Kapil Dev (14)

The India national cricket team toured Australia in the 1980–81 season to play 3 Test matches. The series was drawn 1-1.

== Test series summary ==
=== First Test ===
2–4 January 1981
Scorecard

India	v	Australia
201 (53.2 overs); Sandeep Patil 65 (78); Len Pascoe 4/61 (19 overs)		406 (109.1 overs); Greg Chappell 204 (296); Kapil Dev 5/97 (36.1 overs)
201 (62 overs); Syed Kirmani 43* (39); Jim Higgs 4/45 (18 overs)

Australia won by an innings and 4 runs
Sydney Cricket Ground, Sydney
Umpires: Mel Johnson (Aus) and Rex Whitehead
Player of the match: Greg Chappell (Aus)

- India won the toss and decided to bat

=== Second Test ===
23–27 January 1981
Scorecard

Australia	v	India
528 (149.4 overs); Kim Hughes 213 (301); Shivlal Yadav 4/143 (42.4 overs)		419 (137.4 overs); Sandeep Patil 174 (240); Dennis Lillee 4/80 (34 overs)
221/7d (90 overs); Kim Hughes 53 (121); Dilip Doshi 3/49 (33 overs)		135/8 (75 overs); Dilip Vengsarkar 37 (82); Len Pascoe 3/32 (11 overs)

Match drawn
Adelaide Oval, Adelaide
Umpires: Tony Crafter (Aus) and Rex Whitehead (Aus)
Player of the match: Kim Hughes (Aus)

- India won the toss and decided to field

=== Third Test ===
7–11 February 1981
Scorecard

India	v	Australia
237 (84 overs); Gundappa Viswanath 114 (222); Dennis Lillee 4/65 (25 overs)		419 (156.3 overs); Allan Border 124 (265); Dilip Doshi 3/109 (52 overs)
324 (109.1 overs); Chetan Chauhan 85 (198); Dennis Lillee 4/104 (32.1 overs)		83 (48.4 overs); Doug Walters 18* (60); Kapil Dev 5/28 (16.4 overs)

India won by 59 runs
Melbourne Cricket Ground, Melbourne
Umpires: Mel Johnson (Aus) and Rex Whitehead (Aus)
Player of the match: Gundappa Viswanath (Ind)

- Australia won the toss and decided to field
- Allan Border (Aus) passed 2,000 runs in Tests.
- Dennis Lillee (Aus) claimed his 250th wicket in Tests.

== ODI series ==
India also competed in a tri-nation ODI tournament involving Australia and New Zealand. India won three of their ten-round robin matches but failed to qualify for the five-match final in which Australia defeated New Zealand 3–1.

== Annual reviews ==
- Playfair Cricket Annual 1981
- Wisden Cricketers' Almanack 1981

== External sources ==
- Tour home at Cricinfo archive
- India Tour of Australia & New Zealand 1980-81 at test-cricket-tours.co.uk
- India in Australia and New Zealand 1980/81 at CricketArchive (subscription required)
