= 1981–82 Australia Tri-Nation Series =

1981–82 World Series
- Date: 21 November 1981 – 27 January 1982
- Location: Australia
- Result: Won by West Indies; 3–1 in final series
Teams
Australia	Pakistan	West Indies
Captains
Greg Chappell	Javed Miandad	Clive Lloyd
Most runs
Graham Wood (384)	Zaheer Abbas (343)	Viv Richards (536)
Most wickets
Jeff Thomson (19)	Imran Khan (15)	Joel Garner (24)

The 1981–82 World Series was a One Day International (ODI) cricket tri-series where Australia played host to Pakistan and West Indies. Australia and West Indies reached the Finals, with West Indies winning the best-of-five final series 3–1.

== Uniforms ==
Australia
Australia kit

Pakistan
Pakistan kit

West Indies
West Indies kit

== Points table ==
Team	P	W	L	T	NR	Pts	RR
West Indies	10	7	3	0	0	14	4.281
Australia	10	4	6	0	0	8	4.221
Pakistan	10	4	6	0	0	8	3.922

== Group stage ==
21 November 1981
Scorecard

West Indies; 245/8 (50 overs)	v	Pakistan; 227/6 (50 overs)
Gordon Greenidge 103 (161); Sarfraz Nawaz 4/37 (9 overs)		Javed Miandad 74 (81); Andy Roberts 3/42 (10 overs)

West Indies won by 18 runs
Melbourne Cricket Ground, Melbourne
Umpires: Dick French (Aus) and Robin Bailhache (Aus)
Player of the match: Gordon Greenidge (WI)

- Pakistan won the toss and elected to field.
- Rizwan-uz-Zaman (Pak) made his ODI debut.

22 November 1981
Scorecard

Australia; 209/9 (50 overs)	v	Pakistan; 210/6 (49.2 overs)
Kim Hughes 67 (83); Sikander Bakht 4/34 (10 overs)		Javed Miandad 72 (82); Greg Chappell 3/33 (9 overs)

Pakistan won by 4 wickets
Melbourne Cricket Ground, Melbourne
Umpires: Bruce Martin (Aus) and Rex Whitehead (Aus)
Player of the match: Javed Miandad (Pak)

- Pakistan won the toss and elected to field.

24 November 1981 (D/N)
Scorecard

West Indies; 236/8 (49 overs)	v	Australia; 237/3 (47 overs)
Clive Lloyd 63 (59); Jeff Thomson 3/55 (10 overs)		Bruce Laird 117* (159); Michael Holding 1/34 (10 overs)

Australia won by 7 wickets
Sydney Cricket Ground, Sydney
Umpires: Tony Crafter (Aus) and Mel Johnson (Aus)
Player of the match: Bruce Laird (Aus)

- West Indies won the toss and elected to bat.
- Match was reduced to 49 overs per side due to rain

5 December 1981
Scorecard

Pakistan; 140 (49 overs)	v	West Indies; 132 (38.5 overs)
Zaheer Abbas 46 (114); Malcolm Marshall 2/18 (9 overs)		Faoud Bacchus 37 (67); Wasim Raja 4/25 (7 overs)

Pakistan won by 8 runs
Adelaide Oval, Adelaide
Umpires: Bruce Martin (Aus) and Tony Crafter (Aus)
Player of the match: Wasim Raja (Pak)

- West Indies won the toss and elected to field.
- Match was reduced to 49 overs per side due to rain
- Jeff Dujon (WI) made his ODI debut.

6 December 1981
Scorecard

Australia; 208 (48.3 overs)	v	Pakistan; 170/8 (50 overs)
Graeme Wood 43* (54); Imran Khan 3/19 (9.3 overs)		Zaheer Abbas 38 (48); Greg Chappell 3/31 (10 overs)

Australia won by 38 runs
Adelaide Oval, Adelaide
Umpires: Dick French (Aus) and Robin Bailhache (Aus)
Player of the match: Greg Chappell (Aus)

- Australia won the toss and elected to bat.

17 December 1981
Scorecard

Australia; 222/6 (50 overs)	v	Pakistan; 223/4 (43.2 overs)
Rick Darling 74 (100); Mudassar Nazar 3/20 (10 overs)		Zaheer Abbas 108 (110); Greg Chappell 2/38 (6.2 overs)

Pakistan won by 6 wickets
Sydney Cricket Ground, Sydney
Umpires: Dick French (Aus) and Mel Johnson (Aus)
Player of the match: Mudassar Nazar (Pak)

- Pakistan won the toss and elected to field.
- Dirk Wellham (Aus) made his ODI debut.

19 December 1981
Scorecard

Pakistan; 160 (44.4 overs)	v	West Indies; 161/3 (42.2 overs)
Zaheer Abbas 35 (61); Joel Garner 3/23 (9 overs)		Desmond Haynes 82* (135); Wasim Raja 1/26 (10 overs)

West Indies won by 7 wickets
WACA Ground, Perth
Umpires: Bruce Martin (Aus) and Rex Whitehead (Aus)
Player of the match: Desmond Haynes (WI)

- Pakistan won the toss and elected to bat.
- Gus Logie (WI) made his ODI debut.

20 December 1981
Scorecard

Australia; 188/9 (50 overs)	v	West Indies; 190/2 (30 overs)
Graeme Wood 54 (83); Malcolm Marshall 3/31 (10 overs)		Clive Lloyd 80* (82); Dennis Lillee 1/36 (6 overs)

West Indies won by 8 wickets
WACA Ground, Perth
Umpires: Tony Crafter (Aus) and Robin Bailhache (Aus)
Player of the match: Clive Lloyd (WI)

- West Indies won the toss and elected to field.

9 January 1982
Scorecard

Pakistan; 218/6 (50 overs)	v	Australia; 193 (49 overs)
Zaheer Abbas 84 (113); Jeff Thomson 2/55 (10 overs)		Allan Border 75 (85); Sikander Bakht 2/33 (8 overs)

Pakistan won by 25 runs
Melbourne Cricket Ground, Melbourne
Umpires: Tony Crafter (Aus) and Rex Whitehead (Aus)
Player of the match: Zaheer Abbas (Pak)

- Australia won the toss and elected to field.

10 January 1982
Scorecard

Australia; 146 (42.5 overs)	v	West Indies; 147/5 (47.1 overs)
Greg Chappell 59 (96); Michael Holding 4/32 (7.5 overs)		Jeff Dujon 51* (80); Mick Malone 2/9 (10 overs)

West Indies won by 5 wickets
Melbourne Cricket Ground, Melbourne
Umpires: Bruce Martin (Aus) and Robin Bailhache (Aus)
Player of the match: Jeff Dujon (WI)

- Australia won the toss and elected to bat.

12 January 1982 (D/N)
Scorecard

Pakistan; 191/7 (50 overs)	v	West Indies; 192/3 (42.1 overs)
Imran Khan 62* (79); Joel Garner 3/17 (10 overs)		Gordon Greenidge 84 (122); Imran Khan 2/42 (10 overs)

West Indies won by 7 wickets
Sydney Cricket Ground, Sydney
Umpires: Bruce Martin (Aus) and Mel Johnson (Aus)
Player of the match: Gordon Greenidge (WI)

- Pakistan won the toss and elected to bat.
- Saleem Malik (Pak) made his ODI debut.

14 January 1982 (D/N)
Scorecard

Australia; 230/5 (50 overs)	v	Pakistan; 154 (40.3 overs)
Kim Hughes 63* (73); Mudassar Nazar 3/36 (10 overs)		Mansoor Akhtar 40 (55); Dennis Lillee 2/23 (7.3 overs)

Australia won by 76 runs
Sydney Cricket Ground, Sydney
Umpires: Dick French (Aus) and Rex Whitehead (Aus)
Player of the match: Kim Hughes (Aus)

- Pakistan won the toss and elected to field.

16 January 1982
Scorecard

Pakistan; 177/9 (50 overs)	v	West Indies; 107/9 (28.5 overs)
Mudassar Nazar 40 (90); Joel Garner 3/19 (10 overs)		Faoud Bacchus 36* (42); Sikander Bakht 3/29 (6.5 overs)

West Indies won by 1 wicket
The Gabba, Brisbane
Umpires: Dick French (Aus) and Rex Whitehead (Aus)
Player of the match: Faoud Bacchus (WI)

- West Indies won the toss and elected to field.
- West Indies were set a revised target of 107 runs in 30 overs due to rain.

17 January 1982
Scorecard

Australia; 185/9 (40 overs)	v	West Indies; 186/5 (38.4 overs)
Greg Chappell 61 (43); Joel Garner 4/45 (9 overs)		Larry Gomes 56* (84); Jeff Thomson 2/40 (10 overs)

West Indies won by 5 wicket
The Gabba, Brisbane
Umpires: Tony Crafter (Aus) and Mel Johnson (Aus)
Player of the match: Larry Gomes (WI)

- West Indies won the toss and elected to field.
- Match was reduced to 40 overs per side due to rain.

19 January 1982 (D/N)
Scorecard

West Indies; 189 (50 overs)	v	Australia; 168/7 (43.1 overs)
Vivian Richards 64 (94); Len Pascoe 3/44 (10 overs)		John Dyson 37 (75); Andy Roberts 3/15 (10 overs)

Australia won by 5 runs (ARR method)
Sydney Cricket Ground, Sydney
Umpires: Robin Bailhache (Aus) and Mel Johnson (Aus)
Player of the match: Andy Roberts (WI)

- Australia won the toss and elected to field.
- When play was halted Australia needed to have scored 164 runs to win.

== Final series ==
West Indies won the best of five final series against Australia 3–1.

=== 1st Final ===
23 January 1982
Scorecard

West Indies; 216/8 (49 overs)	v	Australia; 130 (37.4 overs)
Vivian Richards 78 (97); Len Pascoe 2/33 (9 overs)		Rod Marsh 32 (31); Sylvester Clarke 3/22 (9 overs)

West Indies won by 86 runs
Melbourne Cricket Ground, Melbourne
Umpires: Rex Whitehead (Aus) and Mel Johnson (Aus)

- Australia won the toss and elected to field.

=== 2nd Final ===
24 January 1982
Scorecard

West Indies; 235/9 (49 overs)	v	Australia; 107 (32.2 overs)
Vivian Richards 60 (83); Len Pascoe 4/39 (10 overs)		John Dyson 18 (35); Larry Gomes 3/31 (6 overs)

West Indies won by 128 runs
Melbourne Cricket Ground, Melbourne
Umpires: Dick French (Aus) and Robin Bailhache (Aus)

- West Indies won the toss and elected to bat.

=== 3rd Final ===
26 January 1982 (D/N)
Scorecard

Australia; 214/8 (49 overs)	v	West Indies; 168 (42.5 overs)
Allan Border 69 (67); Sylvester Clarke 3/30 (10 overs)		Clive Lloyd 63 (87); Dennis Lillee 2/18 (10 overs)

Australia won by 46 runs
Sydney Cricket Ground, Sydney
Umpires: Bruce Martin (Aus) and Tony Crafter (Aus)

- West Indies won the toss and elected to field.

=== 4th Final ===
27 January 1982 (D/N)
Scorecard

West Indies; 234/6 (49 overs)	v	Australia; 216/9 (50 overs)
Vivian Richards 70 (88); Jeff Thomson 2/60 (10 overs)		Graeme Wood 69 (107); Andy Roberts 3/48 (10 overs)

West Indies won by 18 runs
Sydney Cricket Ground, Sydney
Umpires: Bruce Martin (Aus) and Tony Crafter (Aus)

- West Indies won the toss and elected to bat.
