= Paul McEwan =

Paul McEwan may refer to:

- Paul McEwan (cricketer)
- Paul McEwan (actor)

== See also ==
- Paul MacEwan, member of the Nova Scotia House of Assembly
