= Aluminum bat =

Aluminum bat may refer to:

- Aluminum baseball bat
- Aluminium cricket bat
