= QCC =

QCC may refer to:

- Queanbeyan City Council
- Quebec City
- Queen's Commonwealth Canopy
- Queensborough Community College
- Queensland Children's Choir
- Queensland Coach Company
- Queensland Conservation Council
- Queensland Cricketers' Club
- Queer Cultural Center
- Quezon City Capitals, now known as Quezon City Toda Aksyon
- Quinsigamond Community College
- Qwest Communications Corporation
- a pathotype of Puccinia graminis affecting barley
