= Phil Carlson =

Australian cricketer (1951–2022)

Personal information
- Full name: Phillip Henry Carlson
- Born: 8 August 1951; Nundah, Queensland, Australia
- Died: 29 July 2022 (aged 70)
- Batting: Right-handed
- Bowling: Right-arm medium

International information
- National side: Australia
- Test debut (cap 300): 27 January 1979 v England
- Last Test: 10 February 1979 v England
- ODI debut (cap 50): 13 January 1979 v England
- Last ODI: 7 February 1979 v England

Domestic team information
- Years: Team
- 1969/70–1980/81: Queensland

Career statistics
Competition	Test	ODI	FC	LA
Matches	2	4	91	25
Runs scored	23	11	4,167	371
Batting average	5.75	5.50	28.34	20.61
100s/50s	0/0	0/0	5/19	0/3
Top score	21	11	110*	89
Balls bowled	368	168	7,512	1084
Wickets	2	2	124	25
Bowling average	49.50	35.00	24.96	23.60
5 wickets in innings	0	0	5	1
10 wickets in match	0	0	1	0
Best bowling	2/41	1/21	7/42	5/35
Catches/stumpings	2/–	0/–	59/–	4/–
- Source: Cricinfo, 7 March 2013

Phillip Henry Carlson (8 August 1951 – 29 July 2022) was an Australian cricketer who played in two Test matches and four One Day Internationals (ODIs) in 1979. He was an all-rounder who played for Queensland between 1969–70 and 1980–81. He played his two Test matches for Australia v England in the 1978–79 Ashes series and the four One Day Internationals against the same opponents. He was called up by Australia when most of their regular first-choice players were playing in World Series Cricket.

== Early life ==
Carlson was born in the Nundah suburb of Brisbane on 8 August 1951. He started playing cricket for Northern Suburbs, where he caught the interest of State selectors when he was in first grade.

== Career ==
=== Domestic ===
Carlson made his first class debut for Queensland when he was 18, as a batsman. He scored 85 in his second game and began bowling as a back up bowler. He scored his first century in 1971–72 – the same season saw him pick up his first five wicket haul.

Carlson played the 1973 season in the Lancashire League for Bacup. He scored 686 runs and took 64 wickets.

During the 1977–78 season, Carlson scored 103 against South Australia. He later made 107 against Western Australia.

For Queensland, Carlson took five wickets in a first class game five times, with one ten wicket haul. He also took a five wicket haul in a one-day game. As of 2012, he was the only Queenslander to score a century and take ten wickets in a match. This feat was achieved against New South Wales in 1978–79, the season where Carlson hit his peak, scoring 545 runs and taking 31 wickets.

=== International ===
Some strong performances at the beginning of the 1978–79 season saw Carlson picked in Australia's squad for the first test. He was made 12th man for that and the second test. He was dropped from the squad for the third test, although he was kept on to play a one-day international.

Carlson then scored a century and took ten wickets in a game against New South Wales. He followed this with 88 against South Australia.

These strong performances saw Carlson selected to play in the Australian side for the fifth and sixth tests, replacing Geoff Dymock. He performed poorly in these two matches, the only tests he played. Afterwards, former Australian selector John Benaud criticised the Test selection of Carlson, supposedly as an allrounder but whose "slow, gentle mediums" and batting ability at number six was not what Australian captain Graham Yallop needed.

Carlson took two Test wickets and two ODI wickets. Graham Gooch was his most popular victim. He dismissed him once in Tests (50% of wickets) and he got him out twice in ODI (100%).

Carlson was not selected for the 1979 Cricket World Cup, and was never able to get back into the Australian team after the World Series Cricket players were available the following summer.

=== Other ===
In April 1978, Carlson and Ian Brayshaw represented Australia at the international indoor double wicket cricket competition in England.

== Later life ==
After cricket, Carlson worked in property and property development. He was diagnosed with type 1 diabetes at the age of 47. In 2014, he was on the board of the Queensland Cricketers' Club. He died on 29 July 2022, ten days before his 71st birthday. He suffered from a long unspecified illness prior to his death.
