= Kim Harris =

Kim Harris may refer to:

- Kim Harris (cricketer)
- Kim Harris (musician)
