= ComBat =

Cricket bat made of aluminium

The ComBat was a cricket bat made of aluminum that was the subject of an incident at the WACA cricket ground in Perth in December 1979.

Australia were playing England in the first Test, and were in trouble at the end of the first day, at a score of 232/8, with Dennis Lillee not out. When the second day of play began, Lillee emerged onto the field carrying not the traditional willow bat, but a cricket bat made from aluminum. The bat, manufactured by the company of Lillee's friend Graeme Monaghan, was intended only as a cheap replacement for traditional cricket bats for schools and developing countries. Nevertheless, Lillee decided to use it in the Test match as a marketing stunt, and at that point, there were no rules against using such a bat. This was not the first time Lillee had used an aluminum bat, as he had employed one 12 days previously in a Test against the West Indies without incident.

The trouble began on the fourth ball of the day, when Lillee straight drove a ball from Ian Botham. The ball went for three runs, and nothing appeared untoward. However, Australian captain Greg Chappell thought that the ball should have gone for a four, and instructed twelfth man Rodney Hogg to deliver a conventional wooden bat to Lillee. As this was happening, English captain Mike Brearley complained to umpires Max O'Connell and Don Weser that the metallic bat was damaging the soft, leather cricket ball.

Although the umpires told Lillee he had to change his bat, Lillee instructed Hogg that he wasn't going to and assumed a posture to face the next delivery. Brearley, Lillee and the umpires held an animated discussion for almost ten minutes, before Chappell decided that the game would be held up if things continued.

He emerged onto the ground, took one of the willow bats from Hogg, and instructed Lillee to be quiet and use the bat; Lillee threw his aluminum bat away in disgust ("throwing the offending lump of metal fully 40 yards towards the pavilion"), and grudgingly took the wooden bat.

Lillee was not censured or disciplined for this incident; both the umpires and the Australian Cricket Board decided to let Lillee off with only a warning. Wisden Cricketers' Almanack said that Lillee's "'unsavoury' behaviour partly overshadowed other individual performances more in keeping with the spirit of the game" and commented "The incident served only to blacken Lillee's reputation and damage the image of the game as well as, eventually, the Australian authorities because of their reluctance to take effective disciplinary action".

After the game, sales of the bat skyrocketed for a few months, with Monaghan giving Lillee a small cut of the profits. This lasted for only a few months before the Laws of cricket were amended to state that the blade of the bat was to be made of wood (Law 5). The bat that Lillee used is still in his possession; after the match ended, he had it signed by both teams. Brearley, realizing a sales stunt when he saw one, simply signed the bat "Good luck with the sales".

The match itself was described by Wisden as "enthralling" and ended with only 14.4 overs remaining in the last day's play, with Geoff Boycott carrying his own wooden bat through the innings and ending marooned on 99 not out. Australia won the match by 138 runs.
