= Kim Harris (cricketer) =

Australian cricketer (born 1952)

Personal information
- Full name: Kim Phillip Harris
- Born: 24 January 1952 (age 74); Adelaide, Australia
- Batting: Right-handed

Domestic team information
- Years: Team
- 1981/82–1983/84: South Australia

Career statistics
Competition	FC	LA
Matches	11	1
Runs scored	471	9
Batting average	24.78	9.00
100s/50s	0/3	0/0
Top score	97	9
Catches/stumpings	9/–	2/–
- Source: Cricinfo, 8 September 2026

Kim Phillip Harris (born 24 January 1952) is a former Australian cricketer. He played in eleven first-class matches for South Australia between 1981 and 1984.

An opening batsman, Harris began his first-class career during the 1981–82 season by scoring 19 and 49 against the touring West Indians, who defeated South Australia by 226 runs. In his next match a few weeks later he scored 52 and 97 in the Sheffield Shield against Queensland. He was not able to sustain this good form, and after playing the first match of the 1983–84 Sheffield Shield he played no more first-class cricket.

Harris was later a cricket coach. He was appointed batting coach of South Australia in 2007.
