= International cricket in 1981–82 =

International cricket season

The 1981–82 international cricket season was from September 1981 to April 1982.

== Season overview ==
International tours
Start date	Home team	Away team	Results [Matches]			
Start date	Home team	Away team	Test	ODI	FC	LA
13 November 1981	Australia	Pakistan	2–1 [3]	3–0 [3]	—	—
25 November 1981	India	England	1–0 [6]	2–1 [3]	—	—
26 December 1981	Australia	West Indies	1–1 [3]	—	—	—
13 February 1982	Sri Lanka	England	0–1 [1]	1–1 [2]	—	—
13 February 1982	New Zealand	Australia	1–1 [3]	1–2 [3]	—	—
5 March 1982	Pakistan	Sri Lanka	2–0 [3]	2–1 [3]	—	—
International tournaments
Start date	Tournament				Winners	
21 November 1981	(Australia) 1981–82 Benson & Hedges World Series				West Indies	

== November ==
=== Pakistan in Australia ===
Test series
No.	Date	Home captain	Away captain	Venue	Result
Test 909	13–17 November	Greg Chappell	Javed Miandad	WACA Ground, Perth	Australia by 286 runs
Test 910	27 Nov–1 December	Greg Chappell	Javed Miandad	The Gabba, Brisbane	Australia by 10 wickets
Test 913	11–15 December	Greg Chappell	Javed Miandad	Melbourne Cricket Ground, Melbourne	Pakistan by an innings and 82 runs

=== 1981–82 Benson & Hedges World Series ===
Group stage
No.	Date	Team 1	Captain 1	Team 2	Captain 2	Venue	Result
ODI 122	21 November	Pakistan	Javed Miandad	West Indies	Clive Lloyd	Melbourne Cricket Ground, Melbourne	West Indies by 18 runs
ODI 122	22 November	Australia	Greg Chappell	Pakistan	Javed Miandad	Melbourne Cricket Ground, Melbourne	Pakistan by 4 wickets
ODI 124	24 November	Australia	Greg Chappell	West Indies	Clive Lloyd	Sydney Cricket Ground, Sydney	Australia by 7 wickets
ODI 126	5 December	Pakistan	Javed Miandad	West Indies	Clive Lloyd	Adelaide Oval, Adelaide	Pakistan by 8 runs
ODI 127	6 December	Australia	Greg Chappell	Pakistan	Javed Miandad	Adelaide Oval, Adelaide	Australia by 38 runs
ODI 128	17 December	Australia	Greg Chappell	Pakistan	Javed Miandad	Sydney Cricket Ground, Sydney	Pakistan by 6 wickets
ODI 129	19 December	Pakistan	Javed Miandad	West Indies	Geoff Howarth	WACA Ground, Perth	West Indies by 7 wickets
ODI 130	20 December	Australia	Greg Chappell	West Indies	Clive Lloyd	WACA Ground, Perth	West Indies by 8 wickets
ODI 132	9 January	Australia	Greg Chappell	Pakistan	Javed Miandad	Melbourne Cricket Ground, Melbourne	Pakistan by 25 runs
ODI 133	10 January	Australia	Greg Chappell	West Indies	Clive Lloyd	Melbourne Cricket Ground, Melbourne	West Indies by 5 wickets
ODI 134	12 January	Pakistan	Javed Miandad	West Indies	Clive Lloyd	Sydney Cricket Ground, Sydney	West Indies by 7 wickets
ODI 135	14 January	Australia	Greg Chappell	Pakistan	Javed Miandad	Sydney Cricket Ground, Sydney	Australia by 76 runs
ODI 136	16 January	Pakistan	Javed Miandad	West Indies	Clive Lloyd	The Gabba, Brisbane	West Indies by 1 wicket (revised)
ODI 137	17 January	Australia	Greg Chappell	West Indies	Vivian Richards	The Gabba, Brisbane	West Indies by 5 wickets
ODI 138	19 January	Australia	Greg Chappell	West Indies	Vivian Richards	Sydney Cricket Ground, Sydney	Australia by 5 runs (revised)
Finals
No.	Date	Team 1	Captain 1	Team 2	Captain 2	Venue	Result
ODI 139	23 January	Australia	Greg Chappell	West Indies	Clive Lloyd	Melbourne Cricket Ground, Melbourne	West Indies by 86 runs
ODI 140	24 January	Australia	Greg Chappell	West Indies	Clive Lloyd	Melbourne Cricket Ground, Melbourne	West Indies by 128 runs
ODI 141	26 January	Australia	Greg Chappell	West Indies	Clive Lloyd	Sydney Cricket Ground, Sydney	Australia by 46 runs
ODI 142	27 January	Australia	Greg Chappell	West Indies	Clive Lloyd	Sydney Cricket Ground, Sydney	West Indies by 18 runs

=== England in India ===
ODI Series
No.	Date	Home captain	Away captain	Venue	Result
ODI 125	25 November	Sunil Gavaskar	Keith Fletcher	Sardar Vallabhbhai Patel Stadium, Ahmedabad	England by 5 wickets
ODI 131	20 December	Sunil Gavaskar	Keith Fletcher	Burlton Park, Jullundur	India by 6 wickets
ODI 143	27 January	Sunil Gavaskar	Keith Fletcher	Barabati Stadium, Cuttack	India by 5 wickets
Test series
No.	Date	Home captain	Away captain	Venue	Result
Test 911	27 Nov–1 December	Sunil Gavaskar	Keith Fletcher	Wankhede Stadium, Bombay	India by 138 runs
Test 912	9–14 December	Sunil Gavaskar	Keith Fletcher	Karnataka State Cricket Association Stadium, Bangalore	Match drawn
Test 914	23–28 December	Sunil Gavaskar	Keith Fletcher	Feroz Shah Kotla Ground, Delhi	Match drawn
Test 916	1–6 January	Sunil Gavaskar	Keith Fletcher	Eden Gardens, Calcutta	Match drawn
Test 918	13–18 January	Sunil Gavaskar	Keith Fletcher	MA Chidambaram Stadium, Madras	Match drawn
Test 920	30 Jan–4 February	Sunil Gavaskar	Keith Fletcher	Green Park Stadium, Kanpur	Match drawn

== December ==
=== West Indies in Australia ===
Frank Worrell Trophy Test series
No.	Date	Home captain	Away captain	Venue	Result
Test 915	26–30 December	Greg Chappell	Clive Lloyd	Melbourne Cricket Ground, Melbourne	Australia by 58 runs
Test 917	2–6 January	Greg Chappell	Clive Lloyd	Sydney Cricket Ground, Sydney	Match drawn
Test 919	30 Jan–3 February	Greg Chappell	Clive Lloyd	Adelaide Oval, Adelaide	West Indies by 5 wickets

== February ==
=== England in Sri Lanka ===
ODI Series
No.	Date	Home captain	Away captain	Venue	Result
ODI 145	13 February	Bandula Warnapura	Keith Fletcher	Sinhalese Sports Club Ground, Colombo	England by 5 wickets
ODI 146	14 February	Bandula Warnapura	Keith Fletcher	Sinhalese Sports Club Ground, Colombo	Sri Lanka by 3 runs
One-off Test match
No.	Date	Home captain	Away captain	Venue	Result
Test 921	17–21 February	Bandula Warnapura	Keith Fletcher	P Saravanamuttu Stadium, Colombo	England by 7 wickets

=== Australia in New Zealand ===
ODI Series
No.	Date	Home captain	Away captain	Venue	Result
ODI 144	13 February	Geoff Howarth	Greg Chappell	Eden Park, Auckland	New Zealand by 46 runs
ODI 147	17 February	Geoff Howarth	Greg Chappell	Carisbrook, Dunedin	Australia by 6 wickets
ODI 148	20 February	Geoff Howarth	Greg Chappell	Basin Reserve, Wellington	Australia by 8 wickets
Test Series
No.	Date	Home captain	Away captain	Venue	Result
Test 922	26 Feb-2 March	Geoff Howarth	Greg Chappell	Basin Reserve, Wellington	Match drawn
Test 924	12–16 March	Geoff Howarth	Greg Chappell	Eden Park, Auckland	New Zealand by 5 wickets
Test 926	19–22 March	Geoff Howarth	Greg Chappell	Lancaster Park, Christchurch	Australia by 8 wickets

== March ==
=== Sri Lanka in Pakistan ===
Test Series
No.	Date	Home captain	Away captain	Venue	Result
Test 923	5–10 March	Javed Miandad	Bandula Warnapura	National Stadium, Karachi	Pakistan by 240 runs
Test 925	14–19 March	Javed Miandad	Duleep Mendis	Iqbal Stadium, Faisalabad	Match drawn
Test 927	22–27 March	Javed Miandad	Bandula Warnapura	Gaddafi Stadium, Lahore	Pakistan by an innings and 102 runs
ODI Series
No.	Date	Home captain	Away captain	Venue	Result
ODI 149	12 March	Javed Miandad	Bandula Warnapura	National Stadium, Karachi	Pakistan by 8 wickets
ODI 150	29 March	Javed Miandad	Bandula Warnapura	Gaddafi Stadium, Lahore	Sri Lanka by 30 runs (revised)
ODI 151	31 March	Zaheer Abbas	Duleep Mendis	National Stadium, Karachi	Pakistan by 5 wickets
