= Maurice Langdon =

New Zealand cricketer

Personal information
- Full name: Maurice Charles Langdon
- Born: 12 October 1934; Wanganui, New Zealand
- Died: 27 March 2022 (aged 87); Tauranga, New Zealand
- Batting: Right-handed
- Bowling: Right-arm medium

Domestic team information
- Years: Team
- 1957/58–1964/65: Northern Districts

Career statistics
Competition	First-class
Matches	25
Runs scored	836
Batting average	19.90
100s/50s	0/5
Top score	77
Balls bowled	3,997
Wickets	60
Bowling average	24.43
5 wickets in innings	3
10 wickets in match	1
Best bowling	8/21
Catches/stumpings	12/–
- Source: Cricinfo, 15 December 2019

Maurice Charles Langdon (12 October 1934 – 27 March 2022) was a New Zealand cricketer who played 25 first-class matches for Northern Districts from 1957 to 1965.

Langdon was a middle-order batsman and medium-pace bowler. He held the record for 33 years for best bowling in an innings by a Northern Districts player in first-class cricket. In January 1964 he claimed 8/21 against Auckland. This surpassed Gren Alabaster's mark of 8/30 of less than a year before, and stood until Alex Tait took 9/48 — also against Auckland — in February 1997.

Langdon died in Tauranga on 27 March 2022, aged 87.
