= Mike Shrimpton =

New Zealand cricketer (1940–2015)

- Shrimpton in 1993

Personal information
- Full name: Michael John Froud Shrimpton
- Born: 23 June 1940; Feilding, New Zealand
- Died: 13 June 2015 (aged 74); Hastings, New Zealand
- Batting: Right-handed
- Bowling: Right-arm leg-spin

International information
- National side: New Zealand (1963–1974)
- Test debut (cap 97): 1 March 1963 v England
- Last Test: 5 January 1974 v Australia

Career statistics
Competition	Test	FC	LA
Matches	10	122	16
Runs scored	265	5,812	348
Batting average	13.94	29.80	24.85
100s/50s	0/0	7/29	0/1
Top score	46	150	69
Balls bowled	257	4,935	96
Wickets	5	81	0
Bowling average	31.60	29.45	–
5 wickets in innings	0	2	–
10 wickets in match	0	0	–
Best bowling	3/35	6/40	–
Catches/stumpings	2/–	68/–	8/–
- Source: Cricinfo, 1 April 2017

Michael John Froud Shrimpton (23 June 1940 – 13 June 2015) was a New Zealand cricketer and coach. A middle-order batsman and leg-spinner, he played 10 Test matches for New Zealand between 1963 and 1974, but was never able to establish himself in the side. He played for Central Districts in New Zealand domestic cricket from 1961–62 to 1979–80, except for 1974–75, when he played for Northern Districts.

== Cricket career ==
=== 1960s ===
Shrimpton's first first-class century came in the last match of his debut season in 1961–62, when he scored 119, helping to save the game after Central Districts had trailed Canterbury by 230 runs on the first innings. In his next game, in the 1962–63 season, also against Canterbury, he hit 150, which remained his highest first-class score. He was selected for the Second and Third Tests against England later that season, making 31, 10, 21 and 8. David Sheppard thought him "a most promising player, full of fight and determination".

Although Shrimpton failed to reach 50 in the 1963–64 season he played one of the Tests against South Africa, making a pair. He returned to form in 1964–65, scoring 367 runs at 45.87 with three 50s, but was not selected for the Tests against Pakistan or the tour of India, Pakistan and England that followed.

After previously batting in the middle order, Shrimpton was promoted to open the batting in the last Plunket Shield game of the 1965–66 season and made 30 and 29 in a low-scoring match against Otago in Dunedin. He was selected to open for the New Zealand Cricket Council President's XI against the MCC a fortnight later and made 58 and 46. He opened for New Zealand in the three Tests against England that followed, but made only 68 runs, including 38 in the first innings of the Second Test, when he made the second-top score.

He spent the northern summers of 1966 and 1967 playing as Royton's professional in the Central Lancashire League. In 1966 he made 679 runs at 33.95 and took 47 wickets at 16.89, playing with "splendid consistency" and in 1967 his 423 runs at 26.44 and 61 wickets at 10.34 took Royton to second on the final table. He played two matches for Lancashire Second XI in 1967.

He returned to New Zealand cricket in 1967–68 with enhanced bowling skills, but it was not until 1968–69 that he began to exploit them at first-class level. He scored 401 runs at 50.12 and took 6 wickets at 22.33 that season without making the Test side against the West Indies or the touring side to England, India and Pakistan in 1969.

=== 1970s ===
In 1969–70, captaining Central Districts for the first time, Shrimpton scored 461 runs at 46.10 and took 8 wickets at 16.75, and was selected for the final representative match against the Australians, when he scored 75 in "a handsome innings" and put on 151 with Bevan Congdon for the third wicket. Earlier he had taken his career-best figures of 6 for 40, off 29 overs, against Otago in Dunedin, which he followed with an innings of 82 out of 136 for 8 to enable Central Districts to escape with a draw after they had lost their first four wickets for 9.

He scored 283 runs at 23.58 and took 9 wickets at 28.11 in 1970–71, and played in the two Tests against England. Using his googly effectively, he took his best Test figures of 3 for 35, all bowled, in the first innings of the First Test, including Basil D'Oliveira and Ray Illingworth, and he made his highest Test score of 46 in the Second Test, putting on 141 for the fourth wicket with Mark Burgess in "a most attractive display".

He scored 322 runs at 29.27 and took 15 wickets at 17.66 in 1972–73. He was not selected for the Tests against Pakistan and once again missed the tour to England, but he did tour Australia in 1973–74. He began well, hitting centuries against New South Wales and South Australia and gathering 360 runs at 60.00 and 5 wickets at 24.20 before the First Test. He was not able to carry this success into the Tests, however, and after the first two Tests, in which he scored 66 runs and took 2 wickets, he never played Tests again.

Shrimpton continued to play New Zealand domestic cricket until his retirement after the 1979–80 season. He captained Central Districts in 1969–70, 1972–73, and from 1976–77 to 1978–79.

He was also prominent in the Hawke Cup, playing 40 matches for Hawke's Bay and Wairarapa between 1960–61 and 1983–84. He holds the record for the number of runs scored in Hawke's Bay Cricket Association matches.

== After cricket ==
Shrimpton had a BA from Waikato University and an Advanced MCC Coaching Certificate. After his retirement as a player, he coached extensively, including the New Zealand women's cricket team that won the Women's World Cup in 2000, and was later the coach for Cornwall Cricket Club in Hastings and also for the Central Districts women's team.

In 2007 he was awarded the Bert Sutcliffe Medal for outstanding service to New Zealand cricket. He died on 13 June 2015.

The Shrimpton Trophy, named in his honour, is contested annually by the women's cricket teams representing Hawke's Bay, Wairarapa, Manawatū and Taranaki.
