= Gren Alabaster =

New Zealand cricketer (born 1933)

Personal information
- Full name: Grenville David Alabaster
- Born: 10 December 1933 (age 92); Invercargill, Southland, New Zealand
- Batting: Left-handed
- Bowling: Right-arm off-break
- Relatives: Jack Alabaster (brother)

Domestic team information
- Years: Team
- 1955/56–1956/57: Otago
- 1957/58–1959/60: Canterbury
- 1960/61–1962/63: Northern Districts
- 1963/64–1975/76: Otago

Career statistics
Competition	First-class	List A
Matches	96	10
Runs scored	3,200	123
Batting average	23.88	17.57
100s/50s	3/14	0/0
Top score	108	32
Balls bowled	17,514	384
Wickets	275	9
Bowling average	23.24	32.66
5 wickets in innings	15	0
10 wickets in match	2	0
Best bowling	8/30	2/11
Catches/stumpings	54/–	3/–
- Source: CricketArchive, 31 December 2021

Grenville David "Gren" Alabaster (born 10 December 1933) is a New Zealand former first-class cricketer who played for Otago, Canterbury and Northern Districts between 1955 and 1976. A winner of the New Zealand Cricket Almanack Player of the Year Award in 1972, Alabaster was an all-rounder: a right-arm off-break bowler and left-handed batsman. He toured with New Zealand to Australia in 1973–74, but never played in a Test match. His brother Jack Alabaster played 21 Tests; the two brothers played together for Otago and Southland for many years.

== Life and career ==
Alabaster was one of three sons and a daughter born in Invercargill to Harold and Mary Alabaster. Like his older brother Jack, Gren Alabaster attended Southland Boys' High School. While he was studying to become a teacher, and then while moving around New Zealand in his early years of teaching, he played sporadically for Otago, Canterbury and Northern Districts. It was only when he returned to Southland in 1963 that he began to apply himself to developing his cricket skills.

Alabaster took 8 for 30 for Northern Districts against New Zealand Under-23s in March 1963. This established a new record for Northern Districts in first-class cricket, beating Don Clarke's 8 for 37 of just two months previously. Alabaster's mark stood for less than a year, until Maurice Langdon claimed 8 for 21 against Auckland in January 1964. Alabaster had taken a hat-trick against Canterbury earlier in the season.

In a first-class career stretching from 1955–56 to 1975–76 he took 275 wickets at 23.24. He made 3200 runs at 23.88, with three centuries including a highest score of 108 for Otago against Central Districts at Wanganui in 1964–65 when he went to the wicket with the score at 36 for 5. At the age of 39 he was one of the 15-man New Zealand team that toured Australia in 1973–74, and although he did not play in the three Tests he believed that he reached his peak as a bowler as a result of his experiences on the tour. His most successful season with the ball was 1974–75; despite turning 41 during the season he took 34 wickets at 20.11 and helped Otago to victory in the Plunket Shield.

Alabaster also played 31 matches for Southland and Thames Valley in the Hawke Cup between 1961 and 1979. He captained Southland during their reign as title-holders between 1973 and 1977. When a Hawke Cup "team of the century" was selected to mark the centenary of the competition in 2011, he was named as the captain.

He became a New Zealand selector in the late 1980s and managed the New Zealand team on tours of Sri Lanka and Australia in 1987, and again in the 1990s.

Alabaster made his career in teaching. After serving as deputy principal of Aparima College in the Southland town of Riverton, in 1985 he was appointed principal of Waiau College in Tuatapere, also in rural Southland. He lives in retirement in Oxford in North Canterbury.
