= Robert Knight (cricketer, born 1957) =

Australian cricketer (born 1957)

Personal information
- Full name: Robert Leonard Knight
- Born: 20 November 1957 (age 68); Launceston, Tasmania, Australia
- Batting: Right-handed

Domestic team information
- Years: Team
- 1977/78–1981/82: Tasmania

Career statistics
Competition	FC	LA
Matches	15	2
Runs scored	742	0
Batting average	26.50	0.00
100s/50s	1/2	–/–
Top score	114*	0
Balls bowled	–	–
Wickets	–	–
Bowling average	–	–
5 wickets in innings	–	–
10 wickets in match	–	–
Best bowling	–	–
Catches/stumpings	6/–	–/–
- Source: Cricinfo, 4 January 2011

Robert Leonard Knight (born 20 November 1957 in Launceston, Tasmania) is a former Australian cricketer, who played for Tasmania from 1977 until 1982. He was a right-handed batsman.

== See also ==
- List of Tasmanian representative cricketers
