= Phillip Blizzard =

Australian cricket player

Personal information
- Full name: Phillip Ashley Blizzard
- Born: 6 February 1958 (age 68); Burnie, Tasmania, Australia
- Batting: Right-handed
- Bowling: Left-arm fast-medium

Domestic team information
- Years: Team
- 1985/86: New South Wales
- 1979/80–1987/88: Tasmania

Career statistics
Competition	FC	LA
Matches	32	17
Runs scored	569	39
Batting average	15.37	9.75
100s/50s	–/1	–/–
Top score	51	10*
Balls bowled	4,913	978
Wickets	63	15
Bowling average	40.44	37.13
5 wickets in innings	–	–
10 wickets in match	–	–
Best bowling	4/62	2/28
Catches/stumpings	14/–	6/–
- Source: Cricinfo, 3 January 2011

Phillip Ashley Blizzard (born 6 February 1958 in Burnie, Tasmania) was an Australian cricket player, who played for Tasmania. He was a right-handed batsman and left arm fast-medium bowler who represented Tasmania from 1979 until 1984. He also played in one season for New South Wales.

== See also ==
- List of Tasmanian representative cricketers
- List of New South Wales representative cricketers
