= Leslie Appleton =

Australian cricketer (born 1947)

Personal information
- Born: 28 September 1947 (age 79); Hobart, Tasmania, Australia

Domestic team information
- Years: Team
- 1969–1974: Tasmania
- Source: Cricinfo, 13 March 2016

Leslie Appleton (born 28 September 1947) is an Australian former cricketer. He played eight first-class matches for Tasmania between 1969 and 1974.

== See also ==
- List of Tasmanian representative cricketers
