= Underarm bowling incident of 1981 =

1981 cricket controversy

Australia's Trevor Chappell bowls underarm to New Zealand's Brian McKechnie while being observed by umpire Donald Weser, keeper Rod Marsh, and non-striker Bruce Edgar

The underarm bowling incident of 1981 was a sporting controversy that took place on 1 February 1981, when Australia played New Zealand in a One Day International cricket match, the third in the best-of-five final of the 1980–81 World Series Cup, at the Melbourne Cricket Ground.

With one ball of the final over remaining in the match, New Zealand required a six to tie the match. To ensure that New Zealand were unable to achieve this, the Australian captain Greg Chappell instructed his bowler (and younger brother) Trevor Chappell to deliver the last ball to batsman Brian McKechnie underarm along the ground. Trevor did so, forcing McKechnie to play the ball defensively, meaning Australia won. This action, although legal at the time, was nevertheless widely perceived as being wholly against the traditional spirit of cricketing fair play.

The outrage caused by the incident eventually led to an official amendment to the international laws of cricket to prevent it from occurring again.

== Events leading up to the delivery ==
The series was tied 1–1, New Zealand having won the first match and Australia the second. The two umpires for this match were Donald Weser and Peter Cronin, both Australian.

The third match had already seen another moment of controversy, also involving Greg Chappell: with Australia batting, New Zealand's Martin Snedden claimed a low outfield catch off a hit by Greg Chappell when Chappell was on 58. In his live television commentary on Australia's Channel Nine, former Australian cricket captain Richie Benaud exclaimed: "That is one of the best catches I have ever seen in my life". However, Snedden's catch was ruled not out by the umpires. This was some years before TV replays could be used in umpiring decisions; the Channel Nine broadcast did show viewers slow-motion replays of Snedden's catch from various camera angles, including a close-up of Snedden diving to fairly claim the catch. After reviewing several TV replays, Benaud re-affirmed what he had initially seen live, saying: "There is no question in my mind that that was a great catch – clearly caught above the ground, a superb catch."

Some commentators believed that Chappell should have taken Snedden's word that the catch was good, as had been a time-honoured tradition. Chappell maintained he was not sure about the catch and was within his rights to wait for the umpires to rule. Chappell went on to score 90 before he was caught by Bruce Edgar in a similar fashion. This time, Chappell walked after he clearly saw the fielder had cupped his hands under the ball.

Dennis Lillee had bowled the penultimate over to complete his allocated 10 overs with his final involvement being the dismissal of John Parker, caught inside the circle by Trevor. Commentator Richie Benaud's post-game commentary accused Greg Chappell of having "got his sums wrong" by not having Lillee, his best bowler, take the final over. Graeme Beard was the other bowler involved in the mix-up, closing out his allocated 10 in the 43rd and 45th overs after a players meeting involving Greg Chappell, Lillee, Kim Hughes and Rod Marsh was unable to count the overs out correctly using hand calculations.

Trevor then bowled the final over (his 10th of the innings) with New Zealand requiring 15 to win.

Bruce Edgar, who was on 102 not out, was stuck at the non-striker's end the entire over. His innings has been called "the most overlooked century of all time".

The first five balls of the over produced a 4, the dismissal of Hadlee via a plumb LBW, 2, 2 and Ian Smith dismissed bowled trying to heave the ball to the outfield. This left New Zealand requiring 7 to win, or 6 to tie off the final ball. In the event of a tie, under rules at the time of the game, the match would have been replayed; incidentally, this later occurred in the finals of the 1983–84 Australian Tri-Series.

== The delivery ==
New Zealand needed 6 runs to tie the match from the final ball, with eight wickets down. Greg Chappell, the Australian captain, instructed the bowler (his younger brother Trevor) to bowl underarm in a bid to prevent the Number 10 New Zealand batsman (Brian McKechnie) from getting under the delivery with sufficient power and elevation to hit a six. Bowling underarm was legal within the basic laws of cricket at the time, although it was often ruled out under modified playing conditions used in various competitions around the world, such as the Benson & Hedges Cup tournament in England. Underarm bowling had been defunct as a serious technique since the 1910s and at the time of the incident it was universally considered as archaic, uncompetitive, and a style that was not used seriously even at very young junior levels of the sport.

In accordance with cricket protocol, the umpires and batsmen were informed that the bowler was changing his delivery style and that the final ball would be delivered underarm. Trevor Chappell then rolled the ball along the pitch, in the style of bowls.

McKechnie blocked the ball defensively, then threw his bat away in a show of angry frustration. Australia had achieved victory by 6 runs. The New Zealand batsmen walked off the field in disgust. The New Zealand captain, Geoff Howarth, ran onto the field to plead with the umpires. Howarth believed underarm bowling to be illegal in the competition, as per the rules in the English one-day tournaments with which he was very familiar, specifically the Benson and Hedges Cup.

In the confusion before the final ball was bowled, one of the Australian fielders, Dennis Lillee, did not walk into place, meaning that technically the ball should have been a no-ball on the grounds that Australia had one too many fielders outside the field restriction line. Had the umpires noticed this, New Zealand would have been awarded one run for the no-ball, and the final ball would have had to be re-bowled.

== Reactions ==
As the ball was being bowled, Ian Chappell (elder brother of Greg and Trevor, and a former Australian captain), who was commentating on the match, was heard to call out "No, Greg, no, you can't do that" in an instinctive reaction to the incident, and he remained critical in a later newspaper article on the incident.

Commentating for Channel 9 at the time, former Australian captain Richie Benaud described the act as "disgraceful" and said it was "one of the worst things I have ever seen done on a cricket field".

New Zealand team member Warren Lees recounted the underarm incident on New Zealand's 20/20 current affairs show in February 2005. He said that immediately after the match there had been a long silence in the New Zealand dressing room, which was broken suddenly and unexpectedly by fellow player Mark Burgess throwing and smashing a tea cup against a wall. "That summed up how we all were feeling, too angry for words. We felt we'd been cheated. We were livid", Lees stated.

After the incident, the then prime minister of New Zealand, Robert Muldoon, described it as "the most disgusting incident I can recall in the history of cricket", going on to say that "it was an act of true cowardice and I consider it appropriate that the Australian team were wearing yellow". The prime minister of Australia, Malcolm Fraser, called the act "contrary to all the traditions of the game".

== Greg Chappell's explanation ==
In later years, Greg Chappell claimed that he had been exhausted and stressed after a demanding season of cricket and that, in hindsight, he was not mentally fit to be captain at the time. He had also been on the field through the majority of the match that had been played in stifling hot conditions. At the 40-over mark of the New Zealand innings, Chappell (who had scored 90 in the Australian innings and then bowled 10 overs to the New Zealanders) told wicketkeeper Rod Marsh that he wanted to leave the field. Marsh, who described Chappell as being physically spent and exhausted, said that was not possible, and that Chappell had no choice but to see out the match. Despite being captain and arranging bowling changes and field placings, Chappell spent several overs fielding on the boundary because he felt overwhelmed by the conditions and the pressure of the situation.

== Legacy ==
As a direct result of the incident, underarm bowling was banned by the International Cricket Council as "not within the spirit of the game".

The following year, the Australians went on tour to New Zealand. There was a boisterous crowd of 43,000 at Eden Park, Auckland, for the first One Day International of the tour. As Greg Chappell came out to bat, a crown green bowls wood was rolled from the crowd on to the outfield, mimicking what had happened at the MCG the previous year. That day, he scored a century in a losing cause.

Although both Chappell brothers have publicly stated their embarrassment, McKechnie bears no ill-will over the incident. Greg Chappell says "All my frustrations boiled over on that day", while Trevor Chappell is reluctant to talk about it. Trevor Chappell remains best remembered for the "Underarm '81" incident.

The incident was later used to inspire an instant kiwi lottery ad that humorously depicts a rematch in which exactly the same conditions had arisen and Australia were again bowling the underarm. However, Brian McKechnie instead places his box in the way and subsequently hits a six as the ball deflects off it, resulting in embarrassment for the Australian players.

In 1993, Sir Richard Hadlee bowled the ball underarm during the Allan Border tribute match in Brisbane, causing much laughter from the crowd.

On 17 February 2005, over 24 years after the original underarm delivery, Australian fast bowler Glenn McGrath light-heartedly revisited the incident in the first ever Twenty20 international, played between Australia and New Zealand. In the last over of the match, a grinning McGrath mimed an underarm delivery to Kyle Mills, which prompted New Zealand umpire Billy Bowden to produce a mock red card. As New Zealand needed more than 44 runs to win off the last delivery, the outcome of the game was never in doubt, so it was positively received in the spirit it was intended by the crowd.

In the 2013 Australian movie Backyard Ashes, Spock rolls a can of beer along the ground to Shep before a backyard cricket match as an allusion to the incident.
