= Tony Dell =

Australian cricketer

Personal information
- Full name: Anthony Ross Dell
- Born: 6 August 1945 (age 81); New Milton, Hampshire, England
- Batting: Right-handed
- Bowling: Left-arm fast-medium

International information
- National side: Australia
- Test debut (cap 255): 12 February 1971 v England
- Last Test: 29 December 1973 v New Zealand

Domestic team information
- Years: Team
- 1970–1975: Queensland

Career statistics
Competition	Test	First-class
Matches	2	41
Runs scored	6	169
Batting average	–	5.63
100s/50s	0/0	0/0
Top score	3*	13*
Balls bowled	559	8,549
Wickets	6	137
Bowling average	26.66	26.70
5 wickets in innings	0	6
10 wickets in match	0	1
Best bowling	3/65	6/17
Catches/stumpings	0/–	18/–
- Source: Cricinfo, 19 November 2022

Anthony Ross Dell (born 6 August 1945) is a former Australian cricketer who played in two Test matches in the 1970s.

== Cricket career ==
Dell was a fast-medium seam bowler who played for Queensland and made his debut against England for the vital Seventh Test at Sydney in the 1970–71 Ashes series. With Australia needing to win, he opened the bowling with Dennis Lillee and took 2–32 in the first innings – John Edrich caught by Greg Chappell for 30 and Basil d'Oliveira bowled for 1 - as England collapsed to 98–5 and 184 all out.

In the second innings, he was the best bowler with 3–65, but England made 302 and the 223 runs required for victory proved too many for Australia to make. Dell batted last and made 3 not out in each innings, so he was at the crease when The Ashes were lost.

His five wickets at 19.40 put him ahead of Dennis Lillee (8 wickets at 24.87) at the top of the series averages, if Ian Chappell's one wicket for 10.00 is excluded.

Dell's only other test was the first test against New Zealand at Melbourne in 1973–74, in which he did not bat, but took 1–54 and 0–9 in Australia's innings victory.

== Life ==
Anthony H Ross Dell was born on 6 August 1945 in New Milton, Hampshire, England. He lived for some of his childhood in Wales, where he attended Howardian High School in Penylan, Cardiff. He migrated to Australia at the age of 14 when his father was transferred to Queensland, where he attended the Anglican Church Grammar School in Brisbane.

Dell's second initial 'H' stood for the middle name "Hiroshima", although only the 'H' was recorded on his birth certificate. His parents gave him the name to commemorate the bombing of Hiroshima, which occurred on the day of his birth. Dell officially had 'H' omitted from his name while at school.

Dell's year of birth was officially listed as 1947 throughout his career and long into his retirement; he revealed in 2021 that he had lied about his age to improve his chances of selection for test matches.

Dell served in the Vietnam War as a national serviceman in the 2nd Battalion, Royal Australian Regiment from May 1967 until March 1968. He took part in several battles around the Australian base at Nui Dat.

He worked in an advertising agency in Brisbane until the 1990s, when the company collapsed.

As a result of his military service, Dell had posttraumatic stress disorder (PTSD), undiagnosed until 2008. He founded the PTSD support group Stand Tall for PTS. Stand Tall For PTS was the official charity partner of the Prime Minister's XI match at Manuka Oval on 14 January 2015 versus the English cricket team.

Dell is the subject of the biography And Bring the Darkness Home written with the journalist Greg Milam and published by Pitch Publishing in 2021.
