= Wally Edwards =

Australian cricketer and businessman (born 1949)

Personal information
- Full name: Walter John Edwards
- Born: 23 December 1949 (age 76); Subiaco, Western Australia
- Batting: Left-handed
- Bowling: Legbreak
- Role: Batsman

International information
- National side: Australia
- Test debut (cap 271): 29 November 1974 v England
- Last Test: 26 December 1974 v England
- ODI debut (cap 25): 1 January 1975 v England

Domestic team information
- Years: Team
- 1973/74–1977/78: Western Australia

Career statistics
Competition	Test	ODI	FC	LA
Matches	3	1	25	8
Runs scored	68	2	1,381	182
Batting average	11.33	2.00	30.68	22.75
100s/50s	0/0	0/0	2/9	0/2
Top score	30	2	153	54
Balls bowled	–	1	199	1
Wickets	–	0	2	0
Bowling average	–	–	70.60	–
5 wickets in innings	–	–	0	–
10 wickets in match	–	–	0	–
Best bowling	–	–	1/11	–
Catches/stumpings	0/–	0/–	16/–	1/–
- Source: ESPNcricinfo, 19 January 2015

Walter John Edwards AM (born 23 December 1949) is an Australian businessman and former cricketer based in Perth, Western Australia. He played in three Test matches and one One Day International in 1974 and 1975. He was the founder and owner of Holman Industries, from 1966 until its sale in 2024.

== Early life and education ==
Walter John Edwards was born in Subiaco, Western Australia, on 23 December 1949.

== Cricket ==
Edwards played in three Test matches and one One Day International in 1974 and 1975.

After retirement, he maintained his links with Australian cricket, as vice-president of the Western Australian Cricket Association from 2000 (receiving life membership in 2002) as well as being on the board of Cricket Australia. He was elected chairman of Cricket Australia in 2011 serving until his resignation in 2015. He was replaced as chairman by David Peever.

== Business ==
Edwards founded Holman Industries in 1966, a company that focused on irrigation products.

The company became particularly successful after it targeted the DIY market in garden watering systems in the early 1990s.

It later expanded its range to include lighting, garden décor, and plumbing fittings. The company was sold to Reliance Worldwide Corporation in February 2024, but Edwards agreed to stay on for two years.
