= Rex Whitehead =

Australian cricket umpire (1948–2014)

Personal information
- Full name: Rex Vernon Whitehead
- Born: 26 October 1948
- Died: 26 June 2014 (aged 65)
- Role: Umpire

Umpiring information
- Tests umpired: 4 (1981–1982)
- ODIs umpired: 14 (1979–1983)
- WTests umpired: 1 (1979)
- Source: Cricinfo, 12 July 2013

Rex Vernon Whitehead (26 October 1948 – 26 June 2014) was an Australian Test cricket match umpire, from Victoria.

He umpired 4 Test matches between 1981 and 1982. His first match was between Australia and India at Sydney on 2 January to 4 January 1981, won by Australia by an innings and 4 runs, with Greg Chappell scoring 204 and Dennis Lillee and Len Pascoe taking 13 wickets. Whitehead's partner was Mel Johnson.

Whitehead stood in all three Test matches in that series against India. In the third match, at Melbourne, India won by 59 runs, in spite of nearly forfeiting the match. Whitehead gave the Indian captain Sunil Gavaskar out LBW at a critical point in the match, but the batsman indicated he had edged the ball and reluctantly started to leave the field. Gavaskar urged his partner Chetan Chauhan to follow him. The Indian team manager intervened before Chauhan had left the field, ordering him to continue, and the match resumed. Wisden (1982 ed.) described the event as “a dreadful scene”, saying that “such a bizarre incident … brought controversy over the umpiring to a head”. Gavaskar later claimed he ordered Chauhan to join him in leaving the field in response to abusive remarks made by Lillee.

Whitehead's last Test match was between Australia and England at Melbourne on 26 December to 30 December 1982, a remarkable match won by England by 3 runs only after a valiant 10th wicket partnership of 70 runs between Allan Border and Jeff Thomson was ended by a juggled catch. Whitehead's colleague was Tony Crafter.

Whitehead umpired 14 One Day International (ODI) matches between 1979 and 1983. In 1979, he umpired one women's Test match. Altogether, he umpired 15 first-class matches in his career between 1979 and 1983.

== See also ==
- List of Test cricket umpires
- List of One Day International cricket umpires
