= Jeffrey Barnes =

Australian cricketer (born 1948)

Personal information
- Full name: Jeffrey Robert Barnes
- Born: 9 January 1948 (age 78); Adelaide, South Australia
- Batting: Left-handed
- Bowling: Left-arm fast-medium
- Role: Bowler

Domestic team information
- Years: Team
- 1972/73–1974/75: South Australia

Career statistics
Competition	First-class	List A
Matches	11	3
Runs scored	272	40
Batting average	17.00	20.00
100s/50s	0/1	0/0
Top score	88	19*
Balls bowled	2054	168
Wickets	26	3
Bowling average	45.38	29.66
5 wickets in innings	1	0
10 wickets in match	0	0
Best bowling	6/90	2/41
Catches/stumpings	2/–	0/–
- Source: Cricinfo, 24 April 2018

Jeffrey Robert Barnes (born 9 January 1948) is an Australian cricketer. He played eleven first-class and three List A matches for South Australia between 1972 and 1975.
