= Reg Ledwidge =

Australian cricket umpire (1922–1977)

Reginald Ross (Reg) Ledwidge (1922 in Australia – 10 December 1977 in Sydney) was an Australian Test cricket match umpire.

He umpired three test matches between 1975 and 1977. His first match was between Australia and the West Indies at Perth on 12 December to 16 December 1975, easily won by the visitors by an innings with Roy Fredericks belting 169 runs off 145 balls and Andy Roberts taking 7/54 in an innings. Only Ian Chappell with 156 on the first innings provided any real resistance. Ledwidge's partner was Max O'Connell.

His last Test match was between Australia and Pakistan at Sydney on 14 January to 18 January 1977, won by Pakistan by 8 wickets, their first Test victory in Australia, with Imran Khan taking 6/102 and 6/63. Ledwidge's colleague was Tom Brooks.

Ledwidge umpired 21 first-class matches in his career between 1972 and November 1977. He took ill and died less than a week before he was due to stand in a Test match against India. Wisden described him as "a firm and imperturbable umpire".

As a player, Ledwidge represented Randwick club in Sydney Grade Cricket, scoring over 8000 runs and taking over 500 wickets between 1946 and 1961.

== See also ==
- Australian Test Cricket Umpires
- List of test umpires
