= Peter Cronin =

Australian cricket umpire (born 1947)

Peter Michael Cronin (born 21 December 1947) is a former Australian Test cricket match umpire, from South Australia.

== Umpiring career ==
Cronin was one of two Australian on-field umpires in the underarm bowling incident of 1981.

He umpired in one Test match in 1980 between Australia and England at Melbourne on 1 February to 6 February 1980, won by Australia by 8 wickets. The other on-field umpire was Robin Bailhache.

Cronin umpired six One Day International (ODI) matches between 1979 and 1981. Altogether, he umpired 18 first-class matches in his career between 1977 and 1988.

=== Underarm bowling incident of 1981 ===
Cronin was officiating alongside fellow Australian umpire Don Weser during a match between Australia and New Zealand at the Melbourne Cricket Ground on 1 February 1981 when Trevor Chappell bowled the final ball underarm, which caused great controversy. Cronin was standing at the striker's end when Weser was informed by the Australian captain Greg Chappell that his brother Trevor would bowl the final ball underarm, thus denying New Zealand the chance to hit a six and tie the game. This incident, involving a practice that was illegal in England though legal at the time in Australia, is one of the great controversies of world cricket.

The match branded as the Underarm incident was notable for several umpiring controversies.

During the Australian innings, Martin Snedden claimed a low outfield catch off the batting of Greg Chappell when Chappell was on 58. In his live commentary former Australian cricket captain Richie Benaud exclaimed "that is one of the best catches I have ever seen in my life". Following a short discussion, Snedden's catch was ruled not out by the two Australian umpires, Weser and Cronin. It was some years before TV replays could be used in umpiring decisions. However the Channel Nine TV broadcast did show viewers a number of slow motion replays of Snedden's catch from various TV angles including a close up of Snedden diving to fairly claim the catch. After reviewing several TV replays Benaud re-affirmed what he had initially seen live, stating in his commentary: "there is no question in my mind that that was a great catch - clearly caught above the ground, a superb catch." Chappell went on to score 90 in his innings.

In yet another umpiring controversy during the match, Australia had one too many fielders outside the field restriction line when the final ball was bowled meaning the underarm delivery should have been adjudged a no-ball by the umpires.

== See also ==
- List of Test cricket umpires
- List of One Day International cricket umpires
