= Bruce Doolan =

Australian cricketer (born 1947)

Personal information
- Full name: Bruce Richard Doolan
- Born: 9 September 1947 (age 79); Launceston, Tasmania, Australia
- Batting: Left-handed
- Role: Wicket-keeper
- Relatives: Alex Doolan (son)

Domestic team information
- Years: Team
- 1972/73–1977/78: Tasmania

Career statistics
Competition	First-class	List A
Matches	12	11
Runs scored	470	240
Batting average	22.38	21.81
100s/50s	1/1	0/1
Top score	113*	53
Catches/stumpings	15/0	8/1
- Source: CricketArchive, 3 November 2010

Bruce Richard Doolan (born 9 September 1947) is a former Australian cricketer who played first-class cricket for Tasmania from 1972 to 1978.

Doolan was a left-handed batsman and wicket-keeper. He was a member of the Tasmanian team that played in the state's first ever Sheffield Shield match in 1977, and was a member of the 1978–79 Gillette Cup winning side.
