= Don Weser =

Australian cricket umpire (born 1937)

Donald Weser
Personal information
- Full name: Donald Gordon Weser
- Born: 8 February 1937 (age 89)
- Role: Umpire

Umpiring information
- Tests umpired: 3 (1979–1980)
- ODIs umpired: 8 (1979–1981)
- WTests umpired: 1 (1984)
- Source: Cricinfo, 12 July 2013

Donald Gordon Weser (born 8 February 1937) is a retired Australian Test cricket match umpire, from Western Australia.

He umpired 3 Test matches between 1979 and 1980. His first match was between Australia and England at Sydney from 10 to 14 February 1979, won by England by 9 wickets, thus retaining The Ashes. Australian captain Graham Yallop scored 121 of the first innings total of 198, but the rest of the batting in both innings failed against Ian Botham, John Emburey and Geoff Miller. Weser's partner was fellow debutant Tony Crafter.

Weser's last Test match was between Australia and New Zealand at Perth from 12 to 14 December 1980, won by Australia by 8 wickets, with a bowling attack of Dennis Lillee, Rodney Hogg, Len Pascoe, and Jim Higgs proving too powerful for the visitors. Weser's colleague was again Tony Crafter.

Weser also umpired 8 One Day International (ODI) matches between 1979 and 1981.

== Underarm bowling incident of 1981 ==
On 1 February 1981, during the third World Series Cup final at the MCG between Australia and New Zealand, Weser was informed by Greg Chappell that his brother Trevor would bowl the final ball underarm, thus denying New Zealand the chance to hit a six and tie the game. It was Weser's duty to inform both batsmen which he duly did. This incident, involving a practice that was illegal in England but legal at the time in Australia, is one of the great controversies of world cricket.

The match branded as the Underarm incident was notable for several umpiring controversies.

During the Australian innings, Martin Snedden claimed a low outfield catch off the bat of Greg Chappell when Chappell was on 58. In his live commentary former Australian cricket captain Richie Benaud exclaimed "that is one of the best catches I have ever seen in my life". Following a short discussion, Snedden's catch was ruled not out by the two Australian umpires, Weser and Peter Cronin. It was some years before TV replays could be used in umpiring decisions. However the Channel Nine TV broadcast did show viewers a number of slow motion replays of Snedden's catch from various TV angles including a close up of Snedden diving to fairly claim the catch. After reviewing several TV replays Benaud re-affirmed what he had initially seen live, stating in his commentary: "there is no question in my mind that that was a great catch - clearly caught above the ground, a superb catch." Chappell went on to score 90 in his innings.

In yet another umpiring controversy during the match, Australia had one too many fielders outside the field restriction line when the final ball was bowled meaning the delivery should have been adjudged a no-ball by the umpires.

The match would be the last international men's cricket match Weser was to umpire. The Underarm match would also be the last international match for umpire Cronin. Weser did umpire one women's Test match in 1984.

Altogether, he umpired 32 first-class matches in his career between 1977 and 1985.

He has a son - Michael Perry Weser (born 17 September 1958)

== See also ==
- List of Test cricket umpires
- List of One Day International cricket umpires
- Underarm bowling incident of 1981
