= Paul McEwan (cricketer) =

New Zealand cricketer

Paul McEwan MNZM
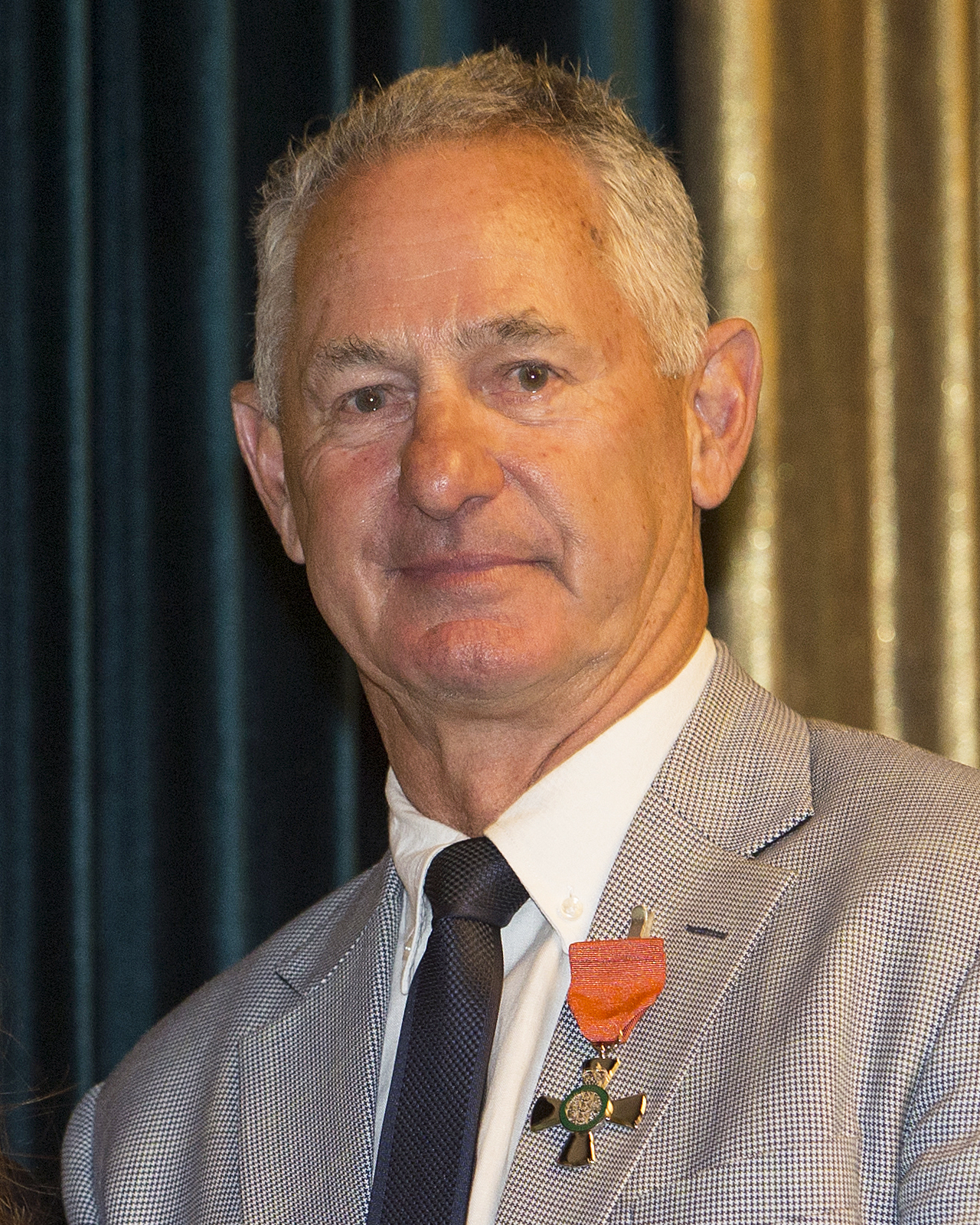
- McEwan in 2022

Personal information
- Full name: Paul Ernest McEwan
- Born: 19 December 1953 (age 72); Christchurch, New Zealand
- Batting: Right-handed
- Bowling: Right-arm medium
- Relatives: Matt McEwan (son)

International information
- National side: New Zealand (1980–1985)
- Test debut (cap 146): 29 February 1980 v West Indies
- Last Test: 10 December 1984 v Pakistan
- ODI debut (cap 35): 6 February 1980 v West Indies
- Last ODI: 5 March 1985 v India

Domestic team information
- Years: Team
- 1976–77 to 1990–91: Canterbury

Career statistics
Competition	Test	ODI	FC	LA
Matches	4	17	115	77
Runs scored	96	204	6,677	1,643
Batting average	16.00	13.60	34.95	23.81
100s/50s	0/0	0/0	12/43	1/8
Top score	40*	41	155	106
Balls bowled	36	420	2,388	1,358
Wickets	–	6	29	27
Bowling average	–	58.83	38.79	36.44
5 wickets in innings	–	0	0	0
10 wickets in match	–	n/a	0	0
Best bowling	–	2/29	3/25	3/31
Catches/stumpings	5/-	1/-	82/-	30/-
- Source: Cricinfo, 4 February 2017

Paul Ernest McEwan MNZM (born 19 December 1953 in Christchurch) is a former New Zealand Test and ODI cricketer who played in four Tests and seventeen ODIs from 1980 to 1985. He played domestic cricket for Canterbury from 1977 to 1991. In the early 1990s, he set up the Canterbury Neonatal Unit Trust.

== Career ==
McEwan received his secondary education at St Andrew's College, Christchurch, Graham Dowling's old school, and went on to pass Dowling's run-scoring record for Canterbury. He played for Old Collegians in Christchurch and Ian Cromb influenced him as a young club player. He made his first-class debut for Canterbury during the 1976–77 season.

McEwan was a hard-hitting, orthodox right-hand batsman and a right-arm medium-pace bowler. He scored consistently for Canterbury for over a decade. His best seasons were 1983–84, when he scored 713 runs at 59.41, and 1989–90, when, aged 36, he scored 758 runs at 44.58. In his last season, 1990–91, he scored over 500 runs at 43.41. One of the best examples of his attacking batting was when his 155 and 35-ball 50 against Auckland won the Shell Trophy for Canterbury in the last game of the 1983–84 season. In 1984–85 McEwan was brought in as a late replacement for the Young New Zealand tour of Zimbabwe under the captaincy of Jeff Crowe. He was the New Zealand team's highest scorer, with 364 runs at 91.00 in the four games, after a first-ball duck in the first.

McEwan made his Test debut in the 1979–80 series against the West Indies and toured Australia in 1980–81 and Pakistan in 1984–85. However, he was unable to convert his domestic form into success at international level.

McEwan had his Benefit Year for Canterbury (the first given by the province) during the 1988–89 season. During the 1990–91 season, McEwan's last, New Zealand Cricket published the New Zealand first-class Master-Blaster averages. The qualification was 500 runs. No one "batted a thousand" for the season, but the nearest was McEwan, who hit 521 runs off 618 balls with a strike rate of 843 per 1000 balls faced. An example of McEwan's strike power was his century at Lancaster Park against Northern Districts. Coming in fifteen minutes after lunch, he was 99 not out at tea, and totalled 103 off 108 balls.

While McEwan did not achieve success on the international stage, he ended his career as Canterbury's greatest run scorer (5940) with the most centuries (11). He was also the first player to make 100 appearances for Canterbury, ending his career with 103 games. In total, McEwan scored 6677 runs from 115 matches at 34.95 with twelve centuries and forty-three fifties. He had a highest score of 155 and he took 82 catches. With his bowling McEwan took 29 wickets at 38.79 with best figures of 3–25. His first class one-day career had brought 1643 runs from 77 matches at 23.81 with one century and eight fifties. McEwan had a highest score of 106 and he took 30 catches. He took 27 wickets at 36.44 with best bowling figures of 3–31.

McEwan told The Press, "Every ball I faced I endeavoured to score runs. There is so much dead cricket, so many balls just patted back. Garfield Sobers said the best line of defence is attack and I was always looking to dominate a game. I wanted to be on top of the game."

== Family ==
McEwan's first son died two weeks after his birth following heart surgery. McEwan then had twin boys who also had a heart condition and spent 95 days on a ventilator. The McEwans set up the Neonatal Unit Trust Fund in response. In the 2022 Queen's Birthday and Platinum Jubilee Honours, he was appointed a Member of the New Zealand Order of Merit, for services to neonatal care.

== Books ==
- Appleby, M. (2002). Canterbury Cricket. 100 Greats. Auckland, New Zealand: Reed Books. ISBN 0-7900-0867 X..
- McConnell, L.; Smith, I. (1993). The Shell New Zealand Cricket Encyclopedia. Auckland, New Zealand: Moa Beckett Publishers Limited. ISBN 1-86958-034-6.

== Articles ==
- "Averages", New Zealand Cricket News, p. 18, March 1992
