= Queensland Cricketers' Club =

Social members' club at the Gabba, founded 1959

Personnel
- Captain: (Australia) TBA
- Coach: (Australia) TBA

Team information
- Colors: Maroon, blue, and gold
- Founded: 1990
- Home ground: The Gabba
- Capacity: 42,000
- Official website: http://qldcricketersclub.com.au/

Queensland Cricketers' Club is a social members' club in Woolloongabba, Queensland, Australia, located at the famous Gabba, where cricket and Australian rules football are played. It was founded in 1959.

== See also ==
- Cricket in Queensland
