= Geoff Dymock =

Australian cricketer (born 1945)

Personal information
- Full name: Geoffrey Dymock
- Born: 21 July 1945 (age 81); Maryborough, Queensland, Australia
- Batting: Left-handed
- Bowling: Left-arm fast-medium

International information
- National side: Australia
- Test debut (cap 268): 26 January 1974 v New Zealand
- Last Test: 18 March 1980 v Pakistan
- ODI debut (cap 21): 30 March 1974 v New Zealand
- Last ODI: 20 August 1980 v England

Domestic team information
- Years: Team
- 1971/72–1981/82: Queensland

Career statistics
Competition	Test	ODI	FC	LA
Matches	21	15	126	41
Runs scored	236	35	1,518	97
Batting average	9.43	11.66	14.45	9.70
100s/50s	0/0	0/0	1/3	0/0
Top score	31*	14*	101*	15*
Balls bowled	5,545	806	27,726	2,202
Wickets	78	15	425	55
Bowling average	27.12	27.46	26.91	22.03
5 wickets in innings	5	0	13	1
10 wickets in match	1	0	1	0
Best bowling	7/67	2/21	7/67	5/27
Catches/stumpings	1/–	1/–	41/–	7/–
- Source: CricketArchive, 16 December 2009

Geoffrey Dymock OAM (born 21 July 1945) is an Australian former international cricketer. He played in 21 Test matches and 15 One Day Internationals between 1974 and 1980. On his debut, he took five wickets in the second innings against New Zealand in Adelaide in 1974. He was the third bowler to dismiss all eleven opposition players in a Test match, and remains one of only six bowlers to have achieved this.

Dymock captained the Queensland cricket team for 9 matches between 1980 and 1982.

In the words of Gideon Haigh

Geoff Dymock would have played more Tests for Australia in an era less blessed with fast-bowling talent. As it was, he probably exceeded his own expectations when, sporting a bushranger's beard at the age of 34 in 1979-80, he wheeled down his left-arm seamers manfully in India, and against England and West Indies at home. No bowler, too, was so tireless a trier in the years when Queensland seemed likelier to win the FA Cup than the Sheffield Shield.

== Career ==
Dymock made his first class debut in 1971–72. A highlight was 4–34 against South Australia. The following season he took 24 wickets at 26.08.

=== 1973–74: International debut ===
He had a very strong domestic season in 1973–74 with 51 wickets at 19.88. He made his test debut that summer against New Zealand, in the third test in Adelaide, replacing Tony Dell. Australia's selectors were trialling many new players and Dymock debuted alongside Alan Hurst and Ashley Woodcock; he took 2-44 and 5-58 and Australia won by an innings and 57 runs.

=== 1974 Tour of New Zealand ===
Dymock was picked on the 1974 tour of New Zealand. In the first test he took 3-77. Things were harder in the second test, Dymock going for 3-59 and 0-84; his second innings effort was considered particularly disappointing as New Zealand won their first test against Australia. Dymock was dropped for the third test.

=== 1974–75 season ===
Dymock began the 1974–75 season as a front-runner for test selection. He took 20 wickets at 16.8 early in the summer including five wickets against the touring English team. However the selectors preferred Lillee, Jeff Thomson and Max Walker. Dymock took 46 first class wickets at 23.95 that summer.

He was picked for the 6th test, when Jeff Thomson was injured. Dymock went for 1-130 as Australia lost by an innings.

=== 1975–76 and 1976–77 ===
Dymock had a slower season in 1975–76 with 22 wickets at 31.86, and could not force his way into the test team past Lillee, Thomson, Walker and Gary Gilmour. However the following summer he took 34 wickets at 24.65, including 5–24 against South Australia, earning him a spot on the 1977 Ashes in place of Gilmour.

=== 1977 Ashes Tour ===
While in England, it was revealed he was one of our four tour members who had not been offered a spot with World Series Cricket. He was offered the chance to play cricket in Tasmania but turned it down when he was offered sponsorship from radio station 4IP (who were also sponsoring Gary Cosier and Thomson). Dymock took 15 first wickets at 31.20 on tour but was the only pace bowler who did not play a test..

=== World Series Cricket ===
==== 1977–78 ====
Dymock was ignored for national selection during the 1977-78 summer, not picked to play any tests against the touring Indian team and overlooked for the tour of the West Indies.

==== 1978–79 ====
However he began the 1978–79 series well, with 5–45 against Victoria. Dymock was picked to play for Australia for the second test. He took 1-72 and 1-53. He had a better game in the third, taking 3-38 and 2–37 in a rare Australian victory.

The fourth test brought him returns of 0-34 and 0-35. He lost his spot for the fifth test. He did replace Rodney Hogg for the ODIs against England. In the second one his 2-21 helped win Australia the game and won Dymock a Man of the Match award. He scored his highest first class score, 67, in a Shield game.

He was back in the test team for the second test against Pakistan, taking 3-65 and 1–72 in an Australian victory.

=== 1979 Tour of India ===
He was also selected on the 1979 World Cup and the following tour of India.

He took 0–65 in the first test and his batting helped Australia escape with a draw. He was dropped for the second but in the third took 5-99 and 7-67. He became the third bowler in Test cricket's history to dismiss all 11 opposition batsmen after Jim Laker (vs England in 1956) and second being Srinivas Venkataraghavan (vs New Zealand in 1965). In the fourth test he took 4-135 and made 31 not out; in the fifth 2-56 and 4-63; the sixth 2-95.

He took 32 first class wickets at 23.06 in India.

=== 1979–80: Post World Series Cricket ===
Dymock was expected to lose his spot in the Australian team to returning World Series bowlers like Denis Lillee, Jeff Thomson and Len Pascoe. However good domestic form saw Dymock back in the national team for the first test against the West Indies. He was made 12th man but played in the first test against England, taking 3-52 and 6-34. He was kept on for the second test against the West Indies, taking 4–106. The second test against England brought him 4-42 and 3-38 and the third test against the West Indies, 2-74 and 5–104. The third test against England he took 1-54 and 0-30.

=== 1980 Tours of Pakistan and England ===
Dymock was picked on the 1980 tour of Pakistan. He only bowled seven overs on the spin friendly wicket in the first test, took 1–49 in the second and 0–66 in the third.

It was the last test he played for Australia - he was picked on the 1980 tour of England for the Centenary test but did not play in the game - Australia went for two spinners. However he did play in ODIs.

=== 1980–81 ===
Dymock was 35 years old at the start of the 1980–81 season. He took 33 first class wickets that summer at 33.60 but was overlooked at test level in favour of Lillee, Hogg, Geoff Lawson and Len Pascoe. He was Queensland's captain in the absence of Greg Chappell. He signed for a private cricket tour of South Africa, then under apartheid rule, but the Australian Cricket Board objected and the tour was cancelled. Dymock was one of 18 players under contract to the ACB at the time. Dymock said, "I get upset when people in other States or overseas criticise the way Aborigines in Queensland are treated because often the critics are speaking without any knowledge of the subject... I was disappointed when told I couldn't go. Often sporting contacts provide a basis for solutions that can't be worked out at political level."

=== 1981–82 ===
Dymock was appointed Queensland's player-manager at the start of the 1981–82 season. He had just moved to Samford in Brisbane, a considerable distance away from the city and was concerned this would hamper his ability to train and play. However he was able to play and captained the team when Greg Chappell was unavailable. His bowling was less effective, earning 22 wickets at 41.77. Dymock retired from first class cricket at the end of the season.

== Post-playing career ==
Dymock says that when he retired from cricket, he had "earnt virtually nothing for it, my chances of promotion as a schoolteacher were gone."

He was awarded a Medal for the Order of Australia in 1983 and unsuccessfully ran for the Queensland Electoral district of Ashgrove for the Australian Labor Party (ALP).

He was state squad manager for Queensland, and assistant manager on the 1984 tour of the West Indies and the 1985 tour of England.

In 1994, he unsuccessfully applied to be coach of Queensland.

In 2006, Dymock attempted to auction off his baggy green cap but it did not attract the reserve price.

In 2012, Dymock said, "playing cricket for me was a great experience, but financially it has cost me all my life. I am now still working because every time I stopped teaching to play cricket, which I earnt basically nothing for, I lost out on superannuation."

Dymock holds coaching clinics.
