= Tom Brooks (umpire) =

Personal information
- Full name: Thomas Francis Brooks
- Born: 28 March 1919; Paddington, New South Wales, Australia
- Died: 16 July 2007 (aged 88)
- Batting: Right-handed
- Bowling: Right-arm fast
- Role: Bowler

Domestic team information
- Years: Team
- 1946/47–1952/53: New South Wales
- FC debut: 1 January 1947 NSW v Queensland
- Last FC: 23 January 1953 NSW v Victoria

Umpiring information
- Tests umpired: 23 (1970–1978)
- ODIs umpired: 2 (1971–1975)

Career statistics
Competition	FC
Matches	16
Runs scored	192
Batting average	16.00
100s/50s	0/0
Top score	26*
Balls bowled	1463
Wickets	65
Bowling average	22.50
5 wickets in innings	3
10 wickets in match	0
Best bowling	6/54
Catches/stumpings	10/–
- Source: Cricinfo, 16 July 2007

Thomas Francis Brooks OAM (28 March 1919 – 16 July 2007) was an Australian former first-class cricketer and later an umpire. Born in Paddington, New South Wales, Brooks played first-class cricket for New South Wales.

== First Class playing career ==
New South Wales, between 1946/47 and 1952/53 seasons, taking 65 wickets at an average of 22.50, and scoring 192 runs at 16.00. Jack Pollard described him as a "spirited" bowler "who moved the ball appreciably in the air. He played first with the Waverley club but later with the Manly club.

== International Umpiring career ==
He umpired 23 Test matches between 1970 and 1978. His first match was between Australia and England at Brisbane on 27 November to 2 December 1970, a drawn match in which Keith Stackpole scored 207 and Doug Walters a century. Brooks' partner was Lou Rowan.

He was appointed to umpire what would have been the third of that series, with Rowan, which was scheduled for Melbourne, but the test was abandoned without a ball bowled. Notwithstanding that Brooks and Rowan were required to make decisions on several occasions during the first three days scheduled for play, relating to the possibility of play following any number of inspections of pitch and surrounds, the International Cricket Council (I.C.C.) decided that the test could not be recognised as such. A 40-over match was played in place of the test and was won by Australia by 5 wickets. Brooks (and Rowan) thus became the first umpires to stand in a One Day International match. Brooks stood in one other ODI, in 1975.

=== Snow-Jenner Incident ===
The last Test match of the 1970/71 series, at Sydney on 12 to 17 February 1971, was a dramatic game won by England by 62 runs to regain the Ashes. In this match captain Ray Illingworth led the English players from the field following a crowd disturbance after fast bowler John Snow had hit Australian lower-order batsman Terry Jenner on the head with a bouncer. Brooks' colleague Lou Rowan had issued Snow with a warning for intimidatory bowling and Snow's and Illingworth's displeasure was clear to the crowd who booed passionately. When Snow finished his over and moved to his fielding position on the boundary, he was grabbed by a spectator, and had beer-cans thrown at him. Following the English walk-off, Illingworth was advised by the umpires either to resume or forfeit the match, and the players returned after the ground was cleared.

=== World XI ===
In 1971/72 season, a scheduled tour of Australia by South Africa was cancelled following political and moral protests against the apartheid policies of the South African government. In its place a 'World Team' visited Australia and played a series of matches against Australia, which although first class, were never officially recognised as Test matches. Brooks stood in three of those matches.

=== Centenary Test ===
Brooks stood, with Max O'Connell in the Centenary Test Match between Australia and England, played at Melbourne on 12 to 17 March 1977, won by Australia by 45 runs – identical to the result of the first Test 100 years before. Dennis Lillee took 11 wickets, Rod Marsh finally achieved a century against England, debutant David Hookes hit English captain Tony Greig for five consecutive fours, Rick McCosker batted with a broken jaw, and Derek Randall scored a gallant 174, in a memorable match, attended by many of the past great names of Australian and English cricket.

=== Last Test match ===
Brooks' last Test match was between Australia and England at Perth from 15 to 20 December 1978, won by England by 166 runs, in spite of 10 wickets in the match to Rodney Hogg. Brooks' colleague was Robin Bailhache. Brooks made a few dubious decisions, and said later that he felt during the match that he was no longer umpiring at his best, and that he would rather be watching than umpiring. He retired from Test umpiring immediately after the match ended. It was reported in the Sydney Morning Herald (Mossop) and the Adelaide Advertiser (Coward), that he admitted that his nerve had cracked in the match. This was never said in any form and following legal representation a retraction was later printed by the Sydney Morning Herald, on the basis that its report had been obtained from a source found not to be trustworthy. The Adelaide Advertiser provided both a published and private apology.

== Career summary/honours ==
He officiated 95 first-class matches in his career between 1967 and 1979. In 1977 he stood for a full season in the English County Championship and on the basis of points allocated out of ten per match by the various county captains relating to performance, there were only 5 (out of 28) first class umpires who accumulated more.

Brooks received the Medal of the Order of Australia for his services to cricket and baseball in 1984.

Inducted into Inaugural Hall of fame for The N.S.W. Cricket umpires and scorers Association (NSWCUSA) on 16 August 2013.

== See also ==
- Australian Test Cricket Umpires
- List of Test cricket umpires
- List of One Day International cricket umpires
