= Len Pascoe =

Australian cricketer (born 1950)

Personal information
- Full name: Leonard Stephen Pascoe
- Born: 13 February 1950 (age 76); Bridgetown, Western Australia
- Batting: Right-handed
- Bowling: Right-arm fast

International information
- National side: Australia
- Test debut (cap 277): 16 June 1977 v England
- Last Test: 30 January 1982 v West Indies
- ODI debut (cap 35): 2 June 1977 v England
- Last ODI: 20 February 1982 v New Zealand

Domestic team information
- Years: Team
- 1974/75–1983/84: New South Wales

Career statistics
| Competition | Test | ODI | FC | LA |
|---|---|---|---|---|
| Matches | 14 | 29 | 80 | 41 |
| Runs scored | 106 | 39 | 502 | 50 |
| Batting average | 10.59 | 9.75 | 8.96 | 8.33 |
| 100s/50s | 0/0 | 0/0 | 0/1 | 0/0 |
| Top score | 30* | 15* | 51* | 15* |
| Balls bowled | 3,403 | 1,568 | 15,460 | 2,145 |
| Wickets | 64 | 53 | 309 | 69 |
| Bowling average | 26.06 | 20.11 | 25.60 | 20.52 |
| 5 wickets in innings | 1 | 1 | 12 | 2 |
| 10 wickets in match | 0 | 0 | 2 | 0 |
| Best bowling | 5/59 | 5/30 | 8/41 | 5/28 |
| Catches/stumpings | 2/– | 6/– | 23/– | 6/– |
- Source: CricketArchive, 16 December 2009

Leonard Stephen Pascoe (born Leonard Stephen Durtanovich, 13 February 1950) is a former Australian Test and One Day International cricketer.

Born at Bridgetown, Western Australia, Pascoe was educated at Punchbowl Boys' High School in New South Wales, where he was a classmate of Jeff Thomson. The two of them would form a close friendship, playing cricket together at club, state and Test level.

Pascoe played in 14 Tests and 29 ODIs between 1977 and 1982, during which time he transferred to World Series Cricket. In the 1980 Centenary Test at The Oval in London, he took 5/59 in the 1st innings. Pascoe retired from international cricket due to a knee injury after the 1981/82 Frank Worrell Trophy series in Australia.

Pascoe is the son of a Macedonian immigrant father. While a former NSW teammate, Geoff Lawson, claimed in his autobiography that Pascoe was often subject to baiting about his ethnicity during matches, especially from brothers Ian and Greg Chappell, this was contradicted by Pascoe in court, under oath in a defamation case, when he stated that such comments were never made.

He is a popular after-dinner speaker. He once stated, tongue-in-cheek, that "a tiger never changes its spots" (in a sarcastic response to wicket-keeper Rod Marsh's comment "I thought you were going to bowl more bouncers").

Pascoe has spoken of an incident when he hit Indian cricketer Sandeep Patil during the 1981–82 series, which he has stated changed him as a cricketer and stated afterwards that he wanted to retire, which he did after playing another three Tests.

In November 2017, after returning home from a tour of South Australia and Western Australia with former teammates Doug Walters and Jeff Thomson, it was reported that Pascoe had been diagnosed with an infection of cryptococcal gattii and had to spend three weeks in a hospital in Sydney for treatment.

In January 2020, Pascoe encouraged singer/songwriter Matt Scullion to write a song about the 1868 Aboriginal cricket tour to England, having been talking to Gamilaraay elder and retired cricketer Les Knox about the event. Scullion wrote the song, titled "1868", and sung it at the second Twenty20 International at the Sydney Cricket Ground in early 2021, and planned to do so again at the Bradman Museum in April 2021.

== Career ==
Pascoe began bowling for Bulldogs C Shires in 1966-67 and took 57 wickets at an average of 6.84. He bowled alongside Jeff Thomson. Pascoe later said "Of all the fast bowlers, I wanted to be like Fred Trueman. He was a colourful, strong person." He was selected for NSW Colts.

Pascoe made his first class debut for New South Wales in 1974-75. He took 13 wickets at 33.

The following summer Pascoe took 27 wickets at 29.81 and established himself as a state regular.

=== Test Debut ===
He had a very strong domestic summer in 1976-77 taking 35 wickets at 20 and was selected on the 1977 Ashes squad ahead of Alan Hurst. Pascoe bowled well in early tour games and was selected in the Australian side for the first test ahead of Mick Malone. Chappell said the decision to pick Pascoe rather than Malone was "close".

Pascoe had a strong test debut taking five wickets. Former English captain Ted Dexter called him a chucker. He was made 12th man in the second test so Australia could play a second spinner but played the next two tests, taking four wickets in each. A key turning point of the series was when Rick McCosker dropped Geoff Boycott off Pascoe's bowling.

Mick Malone replaced him for the fifth test. Pascoe took 41 wickets on the tour at 21.78.

=== World Series Cricket ===
Pascoe was picked to play for the Australian XI in the first Supertest and took five wickets. He was dropped after the second (where he had taken 1-91) but was back for the 6th Supertest.

Pascoe missed the WSC tour of New Zealand due to injury.

Pascoe won man of the match in a one day game against the WSC World XI taking 5-30.

Pascoe did go on the WSC tour of the West Indies in early 1979. He took five wickets in Australia's tight victory in the 3rd Supertest.

=== Post WSC ===
In 1979-80 Pascoe took 5-24 in a McDonalds Cup game for NSW. This saw him back in the Australian ODI side. An injury to Rodney Hogg saw him back in the test side. Pascoe bowled particularly well in the third test against England taking six wickets. He took 40 first class wickets in 1979-80 at 26.75. He withdrew himself from consideration for the 1980 tour of Pakistan but was selected in the squad to tour England to play the 1980 Centenary Test. Pascoe was selected in the test side over Jeff Thomson and took 5-59 in the first innings. He later recalled:

On the morning of the match... I was going up the steps of Lord's and Jeff was coming down. I checked with him if he had heard, and he said, "Yeah." I said, "Mate, it is not right. You and Dennis should be opening the bowling in a Centenary Test. I'm going to pull a hamstring, so you put your boots on." He said, "If you pull one I'll pull one too." So, when I went out there I bowled for both of us and ended up taking five wickets in the match.

For the first time in his career, Pascoe was the first choice Australian pacebowler through the 1980-81 summer. He took 63 first class wickets at 19.52. However Pascoe withdrew himself from consideration for the 1981 Ashes squad due to injury.

Pascoe took 23 wickets at 33.04 in 1981-82. His efforts saw him recalled to the Australian side towards the end of the summer. Pascoe was selected in the Australian side to tour New Zealand. However he ruled himself unavailable for the 1982 tour of Pakistan.

Pascoe played two more summers of domestic cricket. In 1982-83 he took 27 wickets at 32.51 and was part of the state side who won the Sheffield Shield, although Pascoe was dropped for the final. Pascoe was suspended for one game over the summer.

In November 1982 Pascoe gave evidence in a defamation court case from Ian Chappell concerning the bowler. (This was later appealed.) Pascoe had another clash with an umpire.

The following summer he took 20 wickets at 29.95.

== Retirement ==
In 1992, Len Pascoe applied for scholarships to the Australian Cricket Academy for Glenn McGrath and Stuart Clark.
