= Mel Johnson (umpire) =

Australian cricket umpire (born 1942)

Personal information
- Born: 17 May 1942 (age 84)

Melville William Johnson (born 17 May 1942) is an Australian Test cricket match umpire who accumulated a ten-year career total of 67 first-class matches between 1978 and 1988.

== Career ==
=== Test cricket ===
A native of the Brisbane suburb of Herston, Mel Johnson umpired in 21 Test matches between 1980 and 1987. His first match, between Australia and West Indies, held at Adelaide Oval from 26 to 30 January 1980, was won by the visitors by a massive 408 runs. Johnson's partner was Max O'Connell.

Johnson's last Test match was between Australia and New Zealand at Brisbane Cricket Ground from 4 to 7 December 1987. It was won by Australia by 9 wickets with David Boon scoring a century and Craig McDermott, Bruce Reid and Merv Hughes sharing the wickets. Johnson's colleague was Tony Crafter.

=== One Day Internationals ===
Johnson also umpired 49 One Day International (ODI) matches between 1979 and 1988.

=== Outside of cricket ===
He was also an English teacher at Anglican Church Grammar from 1970s through 1980s.

== See also ==
- List of Test cricket umpires
- List of One Day International cricket umpires
