= Max O'Connell =

Australian cricket umpire (born 1936)

Personal information
- Full name: Maxwell George O'Connell
- Born: 4 April 1936 (age 90); Alberton, South Australia, Australia
- Role: Umpire

Umpiring information
- Tests umpired: 19 (1971–1980)
- ODIs umpired: 6 (1975–1981)
- WTests umpired: 1 (1984)
- Source: Cricinfo, 12 July 2013

Maxwell George O'Connell (born 4 April 1936 in Alberton, South Australia) was an Australian Test cricket match umpire and Australian rules football player and umpire in the SANFL.

He umpired 20 Test matches between 1971 and 1980. His first match, was the Fifth Test in the 1970–71 Ashes series at Melbourne on 21 January to 26 January 1971. In his first over as Test umpire he called "over" and turned to walk to square leg after John Snow bowled the last ball. As a result he missed the England wicket-keeper Alan Knott catching Keith Stackpole and had to give him not out. Snow wrote that he 'could quite understand his actions which illustrate the pressure umpires are also under in a Test', and they were able to joke about it afterwards. Stackpole continued to 30, Ian Chappell scored a century and Australian captain Bill Lawry declared the second innings closed with Rod Marsh on 92, depriving him the chance of becoming the first Australian wicket-keeper to score a century. O'Connell's partner was Lou Rowan.

In 1971/72 season, a scheduled tour of Australia by South Africa was cancelled following political and moral protests against the apartheid policies of the South African government. In its place a 'World Team' visited Australia and played a series of Test standard, although never officially recognised. O'Connell stood in one of these matches, and witnessed Garfield Sobers score 254, an innings regarded by some witnesses as the greatest ever played.

O'Connell stood, with Tom Brooks in the Centenary Test Match between Australia and England, played at Melbourne on 12 March to 17 March 1977, won by Australia by 45 runs – identical to the result of the first Test 100 years before. Dennis Lillee took 11 wickets, Rod Marsh finally achieved a century against England, debutant David Hookes hit English captain Tony Greig for five consecutive fours, Rick McCosker batted with a broken jaw, and Derek Randall scored a gallant 174, in a memorable match, attended by many of the past great names of Australian and English cricket.

O'Connell's last Test match was between Australia and the West Indies at Adelaide on 26 January to 30 January 1980, won comfortably by the powerful visitors by 408 runs. His colleague was Mel Johnson, the eleventh other umpire to partner him at Test level.

O'Connell also umpired six One Day International matches between 1975 and 1981.

Although never a first-class cricketer, O'Connell represented South Australia as a batsman at interstate Second XI standard.

O'Connell was also a well-respected Australian Rules Football player and umpire, having played for both Sturt and Port Adelaide in the SANFL, and umpiring the 1967 SANFL Grand Final. He was awarded Life Membership of the SANFL Umpires Association in 2004.

== See also ==
- List of Test cricket umpires
- List of One Day International cricket umpires
