= Robin Bailhache =

Australian cricket umpire (born 1937)

Personal information
- Full name: Robin Carl Bailhache
- Born: 4 May 1937 (age 89); Adelaide, South Australia, Australia
- Role: Umpire

Umpiring information
- Tests umpired: 27 (1974–1988)
- ODIs umpired: 27 (1975–1989)
- WTests umpired: 1 (1991)
- WODIs umpired: 1 (1988)
- Source: Cricinfo, 13 July 2013

Robin Carl Bailhache (born 4 May 1937 in Adelaide, South Australia) is a former Australian Test cricket match umpire.

He umpired in 27 Test matches between 1974 and 1982 and between 1986 and 1988. His first match was between Australia and England at Brisbane from 29 November to 4 December 1974, won by Australia by 166 runs, with Jeff Thomson taking 9 wickets. His partner was Tom Brooks and together they umpired all six Test matches in that series.

Bailhache’s last Test match was between Australia and the West Indies at Perth from 2 December to 6 December 1988, won by the visitors by 169 runs, in spite of Merv Hughes taking 5/130 and 8/87, including a hat-trick spread over two innings and three overs. Bailhache’s colleague was Terry Prue.

Bailhache also umpired 27 One Day International (ODI) matches between 1975 and 1989. He umpired one women’s Test match in 1991 and one women’s ODI in 1988.

He umpired 95 first-class matches in his career between 1967 and 1992.

Bailhache was elected a Life Member of the Victorian Cricket Association Umpires and Scorers' Association (VCAUSA).

== See also ==
- Australian Test Cricket Umpires
- List of Test cricket umpires
- List of One Day International cricket umpires
