= Australian cricket team in the West Indies in 1977–78 =

International cricket tour

	West Indies	Australia
- Dates: 17 February 1978 – 3 May 1978
Captains	Clive Lloyd	Bob Simpson

Test series
- Result: West Indies won the 5-match series 3–1
Most runs	Alvin Kallicharran (408)	Graeme Wood (474)
Most wickets	Joel Garner (13)	Jeff Thomson (20)

One Day International series
- Results: 2-match series drawn 1–1
Most runs	Desmond Haynes (148)	Gary Cosier (84)
Most wickets	Joel Garner (3)	Ian Callen (4); Jeff Thomson (4)

The Australian cricket team toured the West Indies in the 1977–78 season to play a five-match Test series against the West Indies. The tour also encompassed a pair of One Day Internationals, plus six tour matches against the West Indies' first class sides.

The West Indies won the test series, 3–1, with one match drawn. The West Indies therefore regained the Sir Frank Worrell Trophy which had been lost in 1968. They would hold this trophy against Australia until 1995.

The furore over World Series Cricket had led the ACB to refuse to consider for selection to the national team any Australian player that had signed up to WSC. The West Indies Cricket Board took a different view, and chose a number of their players from those signed to the Kerry Packer organisation for the first two games. This led to the West Indies easily beating the tourists to take a 2–0 lead in the series. However, in the lead up to the 3rd Test in Guyana, the WICB made a decision to leave out three of their WSC contracted players, ostensibly to allow others a chance to play in test matches prior to the West Indies' tour to India and Sri Lanka later in the year, which would be at a time that World Series Cricket could not guarantee the availability of their West Indian players. The non-selection of these three players led to the resignation of Clive Lloyd as captain, and all of the WSC contracted West Indian players to declare themselves unavailable for the rest of the series. Australia won the 3rd Test, but lost the 4th. Australia were on track to win the 5th Test but the crowd rioted and the game had to be called off early.

== Australian squad ==
Australia had just defeated India 3–2 at home during the 1977–78 season; however, the team was rebuilding in the wake of defections of players to World Series Cricket. Most of these players were available for selection but the furore had led the Australian Cricket Board refusing to consider those players that had signed up to play in WSC for selection to the national side.

The original squad selected were as follows:

- Batsmen – Bob Simpson (captain), Graham Yallop, Peter Toohey, Rick Darling, Graeme Wood, Craig Serjeant, Kim Hughes, Gary Cosier
- Fastbowlers – Jeff Thomson (vice captain), Wayne Clark, Ian Callen
- Spinners – Bruce Yardley, Jim Higgs
- All rounder – Trevor Laughlin
- Wicketkeeper – Steve Rixon

=== Replacements ===
Kim Hughes fell ill during the tour and David Ogilvie was flown out as a replacement.

== Tour ==
Australia started the tour well with a victory against Leeward Islands, with Wood and Simpson both scoring centuries and Jim Higgs taking 12 wickets. While in St Kitts Kim Hughes came down with acute stomach pains and was diagnosed with appendicitis.

Australia then flew to Antigua for the first one-day international. Australia won the toss and elected to field. Jeff Thomson was no-balled six times in the first over. The match was notable for Desmond Haynes' international debut, scoring 148 runs. Gary Cosier scored 84 off 78 balls in Australia's response, but they lost through inferior run rate. The game was called off early because of time taking up due to fast bowlers' run ups.

Australia then flew to Trinidad and Tobago, beating that side in first class match by six wickets. Darling scored a century, Serjeant and Toohey made half centuries, and Australia's spinners took 17 wickets (nine of them went to Yardley). This game saw the first of what would become many clashes between the Australian team and West Indies umpire Douglas Sang Hue.

Australia's team for the test match consisted of Darling, Wood, Yallop, Toohey, Cosier, Simpson, Rixon, Thomson, Yardley, Higgs and Clarke, with Serjeant as twelfth man. However Darling fell ill and was replaced at the last minute by Serjeant.

It rained the day before the game and on the morning, so when the West Indies won the toss they elected to field. Australia were dismissed for 90, with only Cosier (46) offering much resistance. Simpson later criticised the preparation of the wicket. The Windies Indies easily passed Australia's total, despite good bowling from Jeff Thomson. Umpire Sang Hue also announced he thought Yardley and Clark were throwers.

When Australia batted again, Yallop scored 81 and Serjeant and Wood got starts, but Australia collapsed to lose 6–15 and lost by an innings. To make things worse Toohey fractured his right thumb.

Due to Toohey's injury and Hughes' health it was decided to send for David Ogilvie to join the squad.

The next tour game, against Barbados, was a draw. Ogilvie was selected to play even though he did not arrive in Barbados until the second day of the match, in order to give him a chance to make the test eleven. Australia batted well, with both Serjeant and Simpson scoring centuries, with half centuries to Wood, Darling and Ogilvie.

Australia replaced Toohey with Darling for the second test, with Serjeant keeping his place.

Australia's first innings was notable for Graham Yallop being the first batsman to wear a full protective helmet in test cricket and Bruce Yardley's knock of 74 off 48 balls. Jeff Thomson then delivered an inspiring spell of bowling which Simpsons said "proved beyond question that he is the world's fastest bowler". Thomson ended up taking 6–77, limiting the West Indies lead to 38, but Australia collapsed in their second innings (despite another Yardley cameo) and the hosts had little difficulty in winning by nine wickets.

After the game, news came through that three of the new players in the West Indies team – Desmond Haynes, Richard Austin and Colin Croft – had signed with WSC.

Australia flew to Guyana to play the local side. Darling, Yallop and Cosier all scored centuries and Laughlin took five wickets, but the match ended in a draw. The match was overshadowed by negotiations with the various boards about the availability of West Indies players who had signed to WSC.

The third test began in controversy when Haynes, Austin and Murray were omitted from the West Indies side – ostensibly in order to give new players a go before the upcoming tour of India. Clive Lloyd objected, and resigned the captaincy, puling out with five other players who had all signed to WSC. The West Indies Cricket Board announced that any players who signed with WSC would not be considered for the rest of the series and picked a new team captained by Alvin Kallicharran. Of the West Indies team, only Kallicharran and Derek Parry had played in the previous tests; six would be making their test debut.

Australia replaced the injured Graham Yallop with David Ogilvie and replaced Jim Higgs with Trevor Laughlin.

The third test was far more equal, with Australia being victorious due to a 251 run partnership between Serjeant and Wood in their second innings. It was a close run result with Australia having to score 69 runs on the final day with 4 wickets in hand – Simpson later said he was so anxious he could not watch the game. However Australia got home by three wickets.

Australia's good form continued in the next game, with a low-scoring victory over Windward Islands. Wayne Clark took 12 wickets and Peter Toohey making a half century.

Rain saw the second one-day international reduced to 35 overs. It was another low scoring game which Australia won by two wickets on the last ball of the match. Bob Simpson was man of the match taking 2–23 and making 23 runs.

For the fourth test, Peter Toohey and Graham Yallop came back into the Australian side from injury (replacing Ogilvie and Cosier), and Jim Higgs was preferred to Trevor Laughlin, as it was felt his bowling would suit the conditions. Simpson felt this side "was the best team since we had been in the West Indies". The West Indies replaced Shillingford with Bacchus and Clarke with Jumadeen.

During the game the umpires expressed concern about Wayne Clark's action. Simpson said he was inclined to agree with them because Clark had adjusted his action because of a bad back.

Australia had the upper hand several times during the test but could not drive home the advantage. They were set 293 to win but collapsed against the West Indies spinners to be out for 94.

Australia decided not to pick Clark for this game or the test because of fear the West Indies umpire would call him for throwing, so Callen took his place.

During the match Yardley was called for throwing by Douglas Sang Hue. There was also considerable protest from the Jamaican crowd about the continued omission of WSC players from the West Indian side.

Australia ultimately beat Jamaica by 2 wickets, with Yardley and Higgs taking 15 wickets between them.

For the final test, Australia replaced Darling with Ogilvie and Clark with Laughlin. Due to Australia protests, San Hue did not umpire the game.

Strong batting from the Australia's saw them keep the upper hand throughout the match. Australia needed only 3 wickets in 35 minutes plus 20 overs to win the game. Eventually century-maker Kallicharran was dismissed, then Holder given out caught behind with 6.2 overs to go. Holder showed dissent at the decision, leaving Australia one wicket to get – but the crowd reacted badly to Holder's response and a riot ensued, forcing both teams to leave the field. It was eventually decided not to continue the game into a sixth day and the game as ruled a draw.

During the game, sports journalist Jack Anderson had been murdered in his home by two gunmen.

== Tour matches ==
=== Leeward Islands v Australia ===
17–20 February 1978
Scorecard

Australians	v	Leeward Islands
431/9d (114 overs); Graeme Wood 122; Elquemedo Willett 6/126 (38)		273 (83 overs); Vance Amory 58; Jim Higgs 6/91 (31)
246 (94.5 overs); Craig Serjeant 63; Elquemedo Willett 4/79 (33)		221 (60.4 overs); Victor Eddy 51; Jim Higgs 6/71 (24.4)

Australians won by 183 runs
Warner Park, Basseterre, Saint Kitts and Nevis
Umpires: R Gosein (WI) and P Whyte (WI)

- Australia

A strike by British West Indian Airways saw the Australians' flight to Antigua delayed. Gary Cosier, Graham Yallop, Peter Toohey and Jeff Thomson were left out of the team. Kim Hughes fell ill and had to have his appendix removed; he was to have batted number three so Graham Yallop, who was going to be 12th man, came into the side.

Both Graeme Wood and Bob Simpson scored centuries in Australia's first innings. Australia's spinners took nine wickets between them as they dismissed Leeward Islands for 273. Australia only scored 246 in response, with Craig Serjeant top scoring, but another fine bowling effort from their spinners saw them easily win the game.

=== Trinidad and Tobago v Australia ===
25–28 February 1978
Scorecard

Trinidad and Tobago	v	Australians
164 (63.1 overs); Dudnath Ramkissoon 27; Bruce Yardley 4/51 (18)		283 (99.4 overs); Rick Darling 105; Raphick Jumadeen 4/76 (32)
297 (114.5 overs); Larry Gomes 120; Bruce Yardley 5/89 (43)		179/4 (60.3 overs); Peter Toohey 48; Inshan Ali 2/38 (17)

Australians won by 6 wickets
Queen's Park Oval, Port of Spain, Trinidad and Tobago
Umpires: S Ishmael (WI) and D Sang Hue (WI)

=== Barbados v Australia ===
11–14 March 1978
Scorecard

Barbados	v	Australians
291 (98.4 overs); Alvin Greenidge 96; Trevor Laughlin 3/57 (19)		511 (155.5 overs); Craig Serjeant 114; Collis King 2/57 (21.5)
386 (115.5 overs); David Murray 108; Ian Callen 3/77 (14.5)

Match Drawn
Kensington Oval, Bridgetown, Barbados
Umpires: S Ishmael (WI) and SE Parris (WI)

=== Guyana v Australia ===
25–28 March 1978
Scorecard

Australians	v	Guyana
361/6d (88 overs); Rick Darling 123; Colin Croft 3/78 (18)		411/9d (104 overs); Timur Mohamed 116; Trevor Laughlin 5/137 (33)
357/7d (101 overs); Gary Cosier 114*; Sew Shivnarine 4/135 (36)		151/5 (41 overs); Len Baichan 40; Kim Hughes 1/0 (1)

Match Drawn
Bourda, Georgetown, Guyana
Umpires: M Baksh (WI) and C Vyfhuis (WI)

=== Windward Islands v Australia ===
6–8 April 1978
Scorecard

Australians	v	Windward Islands
121/9d (34 overs); Kim Hughes 30; Adrian King 6/50 (15)		88 (35.3 overs); Lockhart Sebastien 24; Wayne Clark 7/26 (17)
209 (58.2 overs); Peter Toohey 66; Adrian King 4/34 (13.2)		151/5 (41 overs); Lockhart Sebastien 41; Wayne Clark 5/45 (23)

Australians won by 52 runs
Queen's Park, Saint George's, Grenada
Umpires: DM Archer (WI) and P Whyte (WI)

=== Jamaica v Australia ===
21–24 April 1978
Scorecard

Jamaica	v	Australians
257 (68.2 overs); Maurice Foster 63; Jim Higgs 5/73 (23)		240 (93.3 overs); David Ogilvie 65; Michael Holding 4/36 (16)
215 (75.3 overs); Herbert Chang 64; Bruce Yardley 5/64 (29.3)		233/8 (87.2 overs); Peter Toohey 60; Michael Holding 3/47 (19.2)

Australians won by 2 wickets
Sabina Park, Kingston, Jamaica
Umpires: W Malcolm (WI) and D Sang Hue (WI)

== ODI series ==
=== 1st ODI ===
22 February 1978
Scorecard

West Indies; 313/9 (50 overs)	v	Australia; 181/7 (36 overs)
Desmond Haynes 148 (136); Jeff Thomson 4/67 (10 overs)		Gary Cosier 84 (78); Joel Garner 3/29 (8 overs)

West Indies won by 44 runs (ARR method)
Antigua Recreation Ground, St. John's, Antigua and Barbuda
Umpires: Ralph Gosein (WI) and Wesley Malcolm (WI)
Player of the match: Desmond Haynes (WI)

- Australia won the toss and elected to field.
- Bad light stopped play with 14 overs still to bowl in the second innings.
- Graeme Wood, Rick Darling, Graham Yallop, Peter Toohey, Trevor Laughlin, Steve Rixon, Ian Callen and Wayne Clark (Aus) and Desmond Haynes, Faoud Bacchus, Irvine Shillingford and Wayne Daniel (WI) all made their ODI debut.
- Richard Austin (WI) played his only ODI match.
- At 42 years and 19 days, Bob Simpson became the oldest player to make his ODI debut for Australia.
- Desmond Haynes (WI) scored his first ODI century.

=== 2nd ODI ===
12 April 1978
Scorecard

West Indies; 139 (34.4 overs)	v	Australia; 140/8 (35 overs)
Alvin Kallicharran 34 (52); Ian Callen 3/24 (7 overs)		Peter Toohey 30 (44); Derick Parry 2/27 (7 overs)

Australia won by 2 wickets
Mindoo Phillip Park, Castries, Saint Lucia
Umpires: Phillip Alleyne (WI) and Ralph Gosein (WI)
Player of the match: Bob Simpson (Aus)

- West Indies won the toss and elected to bat.
- Rain delayed the start of play and reduced to match to 35 overs per side.
- Larry Gomes, Derick Parry and Sylvester Clarke (WI) and Bruce Yardley (Aus) all made their ODI debut.
- Alvin Greenidge, Sew Shivnarine and Norbert Phillip (WI) played their only ODI match.
- Irvine Shillingford and Vanburn Holder (WI) and Craig Serjeant and Wayne Clark (Aus) played their final ODI match.
- Bob Simpson, aged 42 years and 68 days, played his final ODI match, the oldest Australian player to do so.

== Test series ==
=== 1st Test ===
3–5 March 1978
Scorecard

Australia	v	West Indies
90 (35.1 overs); Gary Cosier 46; Colin Croft 4/15 (9.1)		405 (109.5 overs); Alvin Kallicharran 127; Jim Higgs 4/91 (24.5)
209 (63.2 overs); Graham Yallop 81; Andy Roberts 5/56 (16.2)

West Indies won by an innings and 106 runs
Queen's Park Oval, Port of Spain, Trinidad and Tobago
Umpires: Ralph Gosein (WI) and Douglas Sang Hue (WI)

- West Indies won the toss and elected to field

=== 2nd Test ===
17–19 March 1978
Scorecard

Australia	v	West Indies
250 (65.1 overs); Bruce Yardley 74; Colin Croft 4/47 (18)		288 (71 overs); Desmond Haynes 66; Jeff Thomson 6/77 (13)
178 (48 overs); Graeme Wood 56; Andy Roberts 4/50 (18)		141/1 (36.5 overs); Gordon Greenidge 80*; Jim Higgs 1/34 (13)

West Indies won by 9 wickets
Kensington Oval, Bridgetown, Barbados
Umpires: Ralph Gosein (WI) and Stanton Parris (WI)

- West Indies won the toss and elected to field

=== 3rd Test ===
31 March – 5 April 1978
Scorecard

West Indies	v	Australia
205 (60.2 overs); Alvin Greenidge 56; Jeff Thomson 4/56 (16.2)		286 (83 overs); Bob Simpson 67; Norbert Phillip 4/75 (18)
439 (116.4 overs); Larry Gomes 101; Wayne Clark 4/124 (34.4)		362/7 (101 overs); Graeme Wood 126; Sylvester Clarke 3/83 (27)

Australia won by 3 wickets
Bourda, Georgetown, Guyana
Umpires: Ralph Gosein (WI) and Compton Vyfhuis (WI)

- West Indies won the toss and elected to bat

=== 4th Test ===
15–18 April 1978
Scorecard

West Indies	v	Australia
292 (96.5 overs); Alvin Kallicharran 92; Jim Higgs 3/53 (16.5)		290 (90 overs); Graham Yallop 75; Vanburn Holder 6/28 (13)
290 (101.2 overs); Alvin Greenidge 69; Bruce Yardley 4/40 (30.2)		94 (43.4 overs); Graham Yallop 18; Derick Parry 5/15 (10.4)

West Indies won by 198 runs
Queen's Park Oval, Port of Spain, Trinidad and Tobago
Umpires: Ralph Gosein (WI) and Compton Vyfhuis (WI)

- Australia won the toss and elected to field

=== 5th Test ===
28 April – 3 May 1978
Scorecard

Australia	v	West Indies
343 (147.4 overs); Peter Toohey 122; Raphick Jumadeen 4/72 (38.4)		280 (90.4 overs); Larry Gomes 115; Trevor Laughlin 5/101 (25.4)
305/3d (86 overs); Peter Toohey 97; Raphick Jumadeen 2/90 (23)		258/9 (96.4 overs); Alvin Kallicharran 126; Bruce Yardley 4/35 (29)

Match drawn
Sabina Park, Kingston, Jamaica
Umpires: Ralph Gosein (WI) and Wesley Malcolm (WI)

- Australia won the toss and elected to bat

== Summary and notable events ==
Overall the tour was a disappointing one for the Australians, particularly their failure to win the 4th and 5th tests. Positives included the batting form of Graeme Wood and Graham Yallop, and the bowling of Yardley, Higgs and Thomson. Jeff Thomson did not enjoy the tour, which contributed to his leaving establishment cricket for World Series Cricket during the 1978–79 summer. After the tour the Australian Cricket Board elected not to ensure Simpson's selection as captain the following summer against England, resulting in Simpson's final retirement from first class cricket.

Despite Thomson not enjoying the tour, his bowling in Second Test Match at Barbados was complimented by Tony Cozier, a veteran commentator of cricket for 40 years. Cozier said that Thomson bowled the fastest he'd ever seen in a Test Match. In this spell, Thomson knocked off Viv Richards' cap and finished with 6/77.
