= Indian cricket team in Australia in 1977–78 =

International cricket tour

- Date: 2 December 1977 – 3 February 1978
- Location: Australia
- Result: Australia won the 5-match series 3–2
Teams
- Australia: India
Captains
- (Australia) Bob Simpson: (India) Bishan Bedi
Most runs
- Bob Simpson (539): Gundappa Viswanath (473)
Most wickets
- Wayne Clark (28): Bishan Bedi (31)

The India national cricket team toured Australia in the 1977–78 season to play 5 Test matches. Australia won the Test series 3–2. The matches were played at the same time as the first World Series Cricket matches.

== Test series ==
=== 1st Test ===
2–6 December 1977
Scorecard

Australia	v	India
166 (46.7 overs); Peter Toohey 82 (142); Bishan Singh Bedi 5/55 (13.7 overs)		153 (50 overs); Dilip Vengsarkar 48 (115); Wayne Clark 4/46 (18 overs)
327 (91.5 overs); Bob Simpson 89 (269); Madan Lal 5/72 (19 overs)		324 (84.7 overs); Sunil Gavaskar 113 (264); Jeff Thomson 4/76 (19.7 overs)

Australia won by 16 runs
Gabba Ground, Brisbane
Umpires: Tom Brooks (Aus) and Max O'Connell (Aus)

- Australia won the toss and elected to bat.

=== 2nd Test ===
16–21 December 1977
Scorecard

India	v	Australia
402 (79.6 overs); Mohinder Amarnath 90 (156); Jeff Thomson 4/101 (24 overs)		394 (118.6 overs); Bob Simpson 176 (355); Bishan Singh Bedi 5/89 (31 overs)
9/330d (73.5 overs); Sunil Gavaskar 127 (145); Sam Gannon 4/77 (18 overs)		8/342 (87.2 overs); Tony Mann 105 (165); Bishan Singh Bedi 5/105 (30.2 overs)

Australia won by 2 wickets
WACA Ground, Perth
Umpires: Robin Bailhache (Aus) and Dick French (Aus)

- India won the toss and decided to bat.

=== 3rd Test ===
30 December 1977–4 January 1978
Scorecard

India	v	Australia
256 (69.2 overs); Mohinder Amarnath 72 (178); Wayne Clark 4/73 (19.2 overs)		213 (50.1 overs); Craig Serjeant 85 (170); B. S. Chandrasekhar 6/52 (14.1 overs)
343 (88.7 overs); Sunil Gavaskar 118 (285); Wayne Clark 4/96 (29 overs)		164 (51.1 overs); Gary Cosier 34 (55); B. S. Chandrasekhar 6/52 (20 overs)

India won by 222 runs
Melbourne Cricket Ground, Melbourne
Umpires: Dick French (Aus) and Max O'Connell (Aus)

- India won the toss and decided to bat.
- This was India's first Test win in Australia.

=== 4th Test ===
7–12 January 1978
Scorecard

Australia	v	India
131 (49.4 overs); Bob Simpson 38 (99); B. S. Chandrasekhar 4/30 (15 overs)		8/396d (101 overs); Gundappa Viswanath 79 (182); Jeff Thomson 4/83 (27 overs)
263 (98.7 overs); Peter Toohey 85 (258); E. A. S. Prasanna 4/51 (29 overs)

India won by an innings and 2 runs
Sydney Cricket Ground, Sydney
Umpires: Robin Bailhache (Aus) and Tom Brooks (Aus)

- Australia won the toss and decided to bat.

=== 5th Test ===
28 January–3 February 1978
Scorecard

Australia	v	India
505 (112.4 overs); Graham Yallop 121; B. S. Chandrasekhar 5/136 (29.4 overs)		269 (82.2 overs); Gundappa Viswanath 89 (175); Wayne Clark 4/62 (20.7 overs)
256 (82.5 overs); Rick Darling 56 (122); Karsan Ghavri 4/45 (10.5 overs)		445 (141.4 overs); Mohinder Amarnath 86; Bruce Yardley 4/134 (43 overs)

Australia won by 47 runs
Adelaide Oval, Adelaide
Umpires: Dick French (Aus) and Max O'Connell (Aus)

- Australia won the toss and decided to bat
- Rick Darling, Bruce Yardley, Ian Callen and Graeme Wood (all Aus) made their Test debuts.

== Annual reviews ==
- Playfair Cricket Annual 1978
- Wisden Cricketers' Almanack 1978

== External sources ==
- India in Australia, 1977/78 at Cricinfo archive
- India in Australia 1977/78 at CricketArchive (subscription required)
