= Australian cricket team in Pakistan in 1982–83 =

International cricket tour

Australian cricket team in Pakistan in 1982-83
	Australia	Pakistan
- Dates: 12 September 1982 – 22 October 1982
Captains	Kim Hughes	Imran Khan

Test series
- Result: Pakistan won the 3-match series 3–0
Most runs	John Dyson (220); Greg Ritchie (205)	Moin Khan (297); Zaheer Abbas (269)
Most wickets	Geoff Lawson (9)	Abdul Qadir (22)
- Player of the series: Abdul Qadir (Pak) and Geoff Lawson (Aus)

One Day International series
- Results: Pakistan won the 2-match series 2–0
Most runs	Bruce Laird (135)	Mohsin Khan (146)
Most wickets	Terry Alderman (3)	Jalal-ud-Din (6)

The Australian cricket team toured Pakistan in September and October 1982 to play three Tests and a two-match One Day International series. Pakistan won the Test series 3–0, and one day series 2–0. Australia failed to win a single game on the entire tour.

In the words of Wisden, "The Australians proved ill-equipped to cope with a Pakistan side beginning to exert its international authority under the leadership of Imran Khan... For Pakistan it was the country's finest cricketing hour. Their three-nil Test victory was unprecedented in a short series there... It all amounted to a tour to rank among the most dismal ever made by an Australian side."

Peter McFarline of The Age wrote "on a ratio of defeats to games, the 1982 Australians in Pakistan have been this country's worst national team."

Australia's wicketkeeper on the tour, Rod Marsh, later wrote that "the more you think of the 1982 Australian cricket tour of Pakistan the more you want to forget it."

== Australian squad ==
Australia had just defeated Pakistan 2–1 at home during the 1981–82 summer season and several of the players had previously toured Pakistan.

Captain Greg Chappell and fast bowlers Dennis Lillee and Len Pascoe who had all just toured New Zealand were all unavailable for selection on the tour. Chappell was replaced as captain by Kim Hughes, his vice-captain, despite the fact that many observers felt the more experienced Rod Marsh should have gotten the job. Hughes had led Australia to defeat on tours of India (1979) and England (1981).

The Australian squad announced on 26 March 1982 was:

- Batsmen – Kim Hughes (captain), Allan Border (vice-captain), Graeme Wood, Bruce Laird, John Dyson, Greg Ritchie, Wayne Phillips (also back up wicketkeeper)
- Fastbowlers – Jeff Thomson, Geoff Lawson, Ian Callen, Terry Alderman
- Spinners – Bruce Yardley, Peter Sleep, Ray Bright
- Wicketkeeper – Rod Marsh
- Manager – Col Egar
- Tour doctor – Dr Paul Koenig
- Tour physiotherapist – Fergus Nelson

Rick Darling was overlooked despite having scored over 1,000 first class runs that summer. However Ritchie had made 836 runs at 59.5 and Phillips had scored 857 runs at 47.6. John Inverarity (30 wickets at 21.6), Jim Higgs (29 wickets at 39.3) and Bob Holland (27 wickets at 24) had taken more wickets as spinners than Sleep (22 at 33) or Bright (20 at 37) at first class level that summer but were not taken. Ian Callen had not toured with Australia since he went to the West Indies in 1978 but had taken 31 wickets over the 1981–82 summer.

Rod Marsh refused to serve as vice captain under Kim Hughes, saying he wanted "to give a younger player the experience of being vice-captain." He was replaced by Border.

The selection panel on tour was Hughes, Border and Laird. Wisden later reported "it seemed that Kim Hughes had a strong and well-balanced team under his command." Hughes thought the team was in better shape than the squad which lost to Pakistan in 1980:

We struggled before, but the spinning combination of Ray Bright and Bruce Yardley, the left- and right-arm orthodox bowlers, gives us a better balance and makes me optimistic of winning the series... But I'm not underestimating our quicks. Jeff Thomson can get us into a winning position if the wickets allow. But he may not be able to get amongst them on the final day and our spinners will have to knock them over.

Hughes would be facing Imran Khan as Pakistan captain. ""I have a healthy respect for Imran", said Hughes. "He is fiercely competitive but fair."

== Preparations ==
Col Egar flew to Pakistan in July in order to help plan the tour.

The team met for four days in Perth for a training camp on 4 September. Kim Hughes said he was pleased with the squad:

Pakistan are in the process of developing one of their best sides ever and they seem to be able to bat well down the order... The boys will have to handle a different diet, customs and outlook on life — but it will be worth it.... Sleep and Yardley have been to India and that should stand them in good stead... In the spin department we have the great balance of a left-arm orthodox in Ray Bright and a right arm exponent in Yardley... The five regular batsmen, Border, Dyson, Bruce Laird, Graeme Wood and myself have seen a lot of cricket, and Ritchie and Phillips will be given every chance to be considered for the Tests.

There had been criticism of Pakistan pitches over the years. The curator of the WACA ground, John Maley, went to Pakistan in 1981 to advise the Board of Cricket Control on making of wickets. Maley found some suitable soil and recommended that the Test strips in Karachi, Faisalabad and Lahore be dug up and relaid.

== Tour ==
The team left Perth on 9 September and travelled via Singapore to Karachi before flying to Rawalpindi. Rod Marsh stayed behind a few days to help his small child recover from an illness.

=== BCCP Patron's XI v Australians at Rawalpindi, 12–14 September 1982 ===
Australia's first tour game was against the BCCP Patrons XI. Wayne Phillips played as wicketkeeper because of Marsh's unavailability, and Australia decided to play three spinners, Sleep, Bright and Yardley.

Australia began well in the first innings, making 9-327 with a century from Kim Hughes, and half centuries from Graeme Wood and Allan Border. Hughes brought up his century with a six off the last over of the day.

However Australia's bowlers struggled to dismiss the opposition, who declared at 5-424, with contributions from Masood Anwar (125), Mansoor Akhtar (130) and Haroon Rasheed (94); Yardley's figures were 2-136. A second innings collapse saw Australia come close to losing the game, falling to 5-82 before recovering to 8-166 at close of play. It ended in a draw.

=== BCCP XI v Australians at Multan, 16–18 September 1982 ===
Australia fared much better in the next tour game, against BCCP XI, where they almost forced a victory. Wood, Hughes and Greg Ritchie both scored half centuries in Australia's first innings total of 277. BCCP XI went from 0-96 to all out for 177, with Ray Bright and Geoff Lawson picking up five wickets each. Australia responded with 3-124 (Hughes opening made 43) then declared. The BCCP XI were 4-67 at close of play. Ritchie's first innings score of 59 put him in contention for test selection.

=== 1st ODI: Pakistan v Australia at Hyderabad (Sind), Sep 20, 1982 ===
20 September 1982
Scorecard

Pakistan; 229/6 (40 overs)	v	Australia; 170/9 (40 overs)
Mohsin Khan 104 (101); TM Alderman 2/63 (8 overs)		GM Wood 52 (74); Jalal-ud-Din 4/32 (8 overs)

Pakistan won by 59 runs
Niaz Stadium, Hyderabad
Umpires: Khizer Hayat and Mahboob Shah
Player of the match: Mohsin Khan (PAK)

- Australia won the toss and elected to field.

Australia travelled to Hyderabad to play Pakistan in a one-day international. It was the first such game Australia had played in Pakistan. The locals were led by Zaheer Abbas in the absence of Imran Khan, who had a side strain. It was the first one-day match Australia had played in Pakistan. Australia played five batsmen (Wood, Laird, Hughes, Border, Dyson) and five bowlers (Thomson, Yardley, Lawson, Alderman and Ian Callen – the latter playing his first international for Australia since 1978).

The crowd of 30,000 was 5,000 more than capacity. About 3,000 police were on duty, many using riot shields, and extra security was implemented as the match went on. A two-metre high steel fence with tipped lances had been erected around the playing area at a cost of A$30,000.

Hughes won the toss and elected to bowl. Mohsin Khan put on 83 with Mudassar Nazar. During Pakistan's innings, some crowd members ran on to the pitch and some Australian players had to defend themselves from what reports described as "enthusiastic mobbing". Kim Hughes had to push away one persistent youth who rolled over on the ground to the cheers of the crowd. When Graeme Wood caught Zaheer Abbas for 26 off Bruce Yardley, large numbers of the crowd passed through loopholes in the fence and charged on to the field, making for Mohsin Khan who was then on 97. Police and officials took five minutes to chase them off using batons and staves. Moshin went on to make a century, prompting another pitch invasion by a youth who attempted to garland him and Allan Border, fielding at square leg. The Australian manager, Col Egar, protested and it was announced soon after noon that the teams would return to Karachi if any further disturbances occurred. The game resumed and Pakistan ended with 6-229 off 40 overs. The crowd continually threw stones at police and during the break, one youth impaled himself on the fence and was taken away for treatment.

In response, Wood and Bruce Laird took Australia to 0-104 off 23 overs before a collapse resulted in them being dismissed for 9-170. Tauseef Ahmed took three wickets and Imran's replacement, Jalal-ud-Din took a hat-trick consisting of Marsh, Yardley and Lawson off the fourth, fifth and sixth balls of his seventh over.

=== 1st Test: Pakistan v Australia at Karachi, Sep 22-27, 1982 ===
22 – 27 September 1982
(5–day match)
Scorecard

Australia	v	Pakistan
284 (99.4 overs); J Dyson 87 (177); Tahir Naqqash 4/61 (16 overs)		419/9d (128 overs); Zaheer Abbas 91 (131); RJ Bright 3/96 (36 overs)
179 (66.5 overs); RW Marsh 32 (56); RJ Bright 32* (83); Abdul Qadir 5/76 (26 overs)		47/1 (11.1 overs); Mansoor Akhtar 26* (37); JR Thomson 1/16 (3 overs)

Pakistan won by 9 wickets
National Stadium, Karachi
Umpires: Khizer Hayat and Mahboob Shah
Player of the match: Abdul Qadir (PAK)

- Australia won the toss and elected to bat.
- 25 September was taken as a rest day.
- GM Ritchie (AUS) made his Test debut.

Australia's team for the first test was Wood, Laird, Dyson, Border, Hughes, Greg Ritchie (making his test debut), Bruce Yardley, Ray Bright, Jeff Thomson and Geoff Lawson. Geoff Lawson was picked over Terry Alderman who was made 12th man.

Pakistan's team was Mohsin Khan, Mansoor Akhtar, Haroon Rasheed, Javed Miandad, Zaheer Abbas, Mudassar Nazar, Imran Khan, Tahir Naqquah, Wasim Bari, Abdul Qadir and Iqbal Qasim.

Hughes won the toss and decided to bat. There were 3-202, with good innings from Dyson (87) and Hughes (54) when Australia lost two quick wickets – Hughes and Ritchie. Rod Marsh later wrote these two wickets meant "we probably lost the entire series in just half an hour on the first day of the first test.. it was just what the Pakistanis needed and just what we didn't. They came out next day and skittled us with the new ball. Had we got through that crisis time and resumed with only three down, it might have been a new ball game, a new series." Wisden reported that "Australia's 218 for five at the close of the first day was inadequate considering the excellent conditions." Australia were dismissed for 284 with Border 55 not out.

Pakistan made 419 in response, with the Australians dropping key catches. Zaheer Abbas, for instance, was dropped at nine, 61 and 80 and made 91.

"We lost concentration with the interruptions, dropped catches, but the bowlers, particularly the pacemen, Jeff Thomson and Geoff Lawson, were magnificent", said Kim Hughes. "Not once did they knock back a spell but just kept going."

The "interruptions" were serious. Items being thrown on the ground – including stones, potatoes and onions – led to Hughes taking his side off the ground on two separate occasions on the third day – one for 14 minutes, one for 25 minutes.

Hughes said, "We should have gone off earlier, but I was sorry for the umpires and the other people who had paid good money to see cricket."

Sikander Bakht, a Pakistani paceman not playing in the Test, said the local players were used to this behaviour. "But I don't blame the Australians for going off", he said.

Hughes later threatened to call off the tour if any of his players were injured.

I'm not going to let my fellows* heads be cut open by razor-sharp stones... This is an insult to the Australian players – we are being treated like animals in a zoo... We should have gone off earlier, but I was sorry for the umpires and the other people who had paid good money to see cricket... We are here to play cricket and are being treated like animals. No wonder other cricketing countries are loath to come here. What bothers me is what happens when we are in a winning position? The same treatment was handed out to the West Indians. We can take the verbal abuse, but I've reached a position where our blokes don't want to field at fine leg.

The Karachi commissioner went with local cricket-association officials to plead with the rioters and were met with a hail of stones, vegetables and water bombs. Appeals were made in Urdu to keep calm in an almost non-stop use of the public-address system throughout the afternoon. "Pakistan is in a strong position : don't worry the batsmen", pleaded the announcer.

Hughes was still positive, saying "If our second-innings batsmen put in three-quarters of the effort of Thommo and Henry, we should save the day. It's still a good wicket and if we can hold them to 100 ahead, we are still in it."

Australia collapsed in their second innings, making 179, with no Australian batsman making more than 32. Abdul Qadir took 5-76, Iqbal Qasim 2-48. Qadir won the game with a spell of 5-44 from 20 overs after the fourth day, including Dyson, Wood and Border in 18 deliveries for six runs.

Pakistan scored the 47 required to win with the loss of only one wicket.

"But for some appallingly sloppy fielding, we may have made quite a game of the first test", wrote Marsh later. "Geoff Lawson and Jeff Thomson did everything anyone could expect of them, but were badly let down by dropped catches. If we'd held those chances, it may have been a different story."

=== 2nd Test: Pakistan v Australia at Faisalabad, Sep 30-Oct 5, 1982 ===
30 September – 5 October 1982
(5–day match)
Scorecard

Pakistan	v	Australia
501/6d (144 overs); Zaheer Abbas 126 (205); GF Lawson 4/97 (33 overs)		168 (102.5 overs); GM Wood 49 (173); Abdul Qadir 4/76 (42 overs)
		330 (f/o) (128.5 overs); GM Ritchie 106* (216); Abdul Qadir 7/142 (50.5 overs)

Pakistan won by an innings and 3 runs
Iqbal Stadium, Faisalabad
Umpires: Khizer Hayat and Mahboob Shah
Player of the match: Abdul Qadir (PAK)

- Pakistan won the toss and elected to bat.
- 3 October was taken as a rest day.

Pakistan kept the same side for the second test. Australia replaced an ill Bruce Yardley with Peter Sleep.

Pakistan batted first and scored 6-501 declared, despite good bowling from Geoff Lawson (4-97). Mudssas and Moshin put on 123 for the opening partnership. Zaheer Abbas made 126 after being dropped on 57; Akhtr made 111. Wisdensaid Lawson's bowling "was an effort of sustained pace and fortitude."

Australia then wilted under the bowling of Qadir (4-76) and Qasim (2-28) making 168, Wood top scoring with 49.

Imran enforced the follow on and his bowlers dismissed Australia for 330 with the spinners taking nine of the wickets – Qadir 7-142 and Qasim 2-91. The one bright spot for Australia was Ritchie's second innings century, 106 not out; Laird made 60.

Geoff Lawson complained about being given out leg before wicket, resulting in an official complaint from the umpire.

Col Egar worried if the team had inadequate preparation:

The boys have come out of a six-month layoff, started their per sonal physical fitness programs in , July, had four days in Perth, two under match conditions on the WACA ground, and then were flung into a totally different world against a national side at the top of their playing abilities after an England tour. The only opportunity to tour was now, but we arc meeting the conscquences of our decision... The Australian batting performance yesterday let down the fielding effort on the previous day, as well as the courage of Lawson with the ball. The bats men read too much into the wicket and gave the advantage to the Pakistan bowling. When we began it seemed that we could get 350 at least, but the dismissals of Bruce Laird and John Dyson were vital and from an umpiring viewpoint, unfortunate.

=== 2nd ODI: Pakistan v Australia at Lahore, Oct 8, 1982 ===
8 October 1982
Scorecard

Pakistan; 234/3 (40 overs)	v	Australia; 206/4 (40 overs)
Zaheer Abbas 109 (95); JR Thomson 1/41 (8 overs)		BM Laird 91* (120); Jalal-ud-Din 2/33 (8 overs)

Pakistan won by 28 runs
Gaddafi Stadium, Lahore
Umpires: Amanullah Khan and Shakoor Rana
Player of the match: Zaheer Abbas (PAK)

- Australia won the toss and elected to field.
- GM Ritchie (AUS) made his ODI debut.

Australia decided on an all-pace attack for the second one-day international, trusting the bowling to Thomson, Lawson, Alderman and Ian Callen. Allan Border was the fifth bowler. Pakistan made 3-234, with Zaheer Abbas scoring 109 and Javed Miandad 61. Australia made 4-204 in response, Laird carrying his bat with 91 not out and Kim Hughes scoring 64 off 67 runs. Wisden wrote that "there was almost an inevitability about Pakistan's advance to victory, despite the temporary abandonment of the antiquated scoreboard by the scorers and a stand of 117 between Laird and Hughes in 74 minutes... Laird was three hours making 91 not out when Australia desperately needed more positive strokeplay."

Zaheer Abbas was named man of the match.

=== Pakistan Invitation XI v Australians at Sialkot, Oct 10-12, 1982 ===
Australia played a tour game against a Pakistan Invitation XI. Wayne Phillips and Ian Callen joined the team, Phillips doubling as wicketkeeper and opener.

The first day was washed out. Australia batted first and made 4-283, Phillips top scoring 92 and Dyson making 71. Pakistan Invitational XI were 7-169 not out at close, Bright taking three wickets.

=== 3rd Test: Pakistan v Australia at Lahore, Oct 14-19, 1982 ===
14 – 19 October 1982
(5–day match)
Scorecard

Australia	v	Pakistan
316 (106.2 overs); GM Wood 85 (172); Imran Khan 4/45 (24.2 overs)		467/7d (119 overs); Javed Miandad 138 (264); GF Lawson 2/91 (35 overs)
214 (90 overs); J Dyson 51 (144); Imran Khan 4/35 (20 overs)		64/1 (15 overs); Mudassar Nazar 39* (51); GF Lawson 1/21 (7 overs)

Pakistan won by 9 wickets
Gaddafi Stadium, Lahore
Umpires: Javed Akhtar and Shakoor Rana
Player of the match: Imran Khan (PAK)

- Pakistan won the toss and elected to field.
- 17 October was taken as a rest day.
- Jalal-ud-Din (PAK) made his Test debut.

For the third test, Australia decided to drop Sleep and Bright and use a three-man pace attack in conjunction with Yardley, recalling Terry Alderman to support Geoff Lawson and Jeff Thomson. Wayne Phillips was 12th man.

According to press reports, "Hughes gave a do-or-die talk to the team" before the test, "but it may yet prove to be as futile as rearranging the deck chairs on the Titanic."

Australia batted first and scored 316, due to late order knocks from Lawson (57) and Yardley (40). Imran Khan took 4-45. Pakistan made 7-467 in response. Javed Miandad was dropped three times, once on 9 before making 138. Mohsin Khan scored 135.

Jeff Thomson kicked down the stumps on the second day after umpire Shakoor Rana had no-balled him. The umpire spoke to the bowler and then to Hughes. After several more no-balls had upset Thomson, he was taken out of the attack. "It was most unThomsonlike behaviour and I'm sure he regretted it as soon as he'd done it", wrote Marsh. "But he'd had enough of Pakistan. We all had."

By stumps on the fourth day Australia were 3-66. Dyson made 51 and Hughes batted for three hours making 39 but they were dismissed for 214. Pakistan won by nine wickets. It was the first time Australia had lost every test in a series in the subcontinent

According to one report, "The out-of-touch Australians have struggled throughout this disappointing tour, made out of season, to honour a commitment. Reputations have gone by the board as batsmen and bowlers have floundered, and most of the team have been out of action at some time with stomach complaints and other virus infections."

Col Egar told the press:

We are battling against the odds – that's not a gutless situation. We are suffering from lack of practice before the tour, our batting lacks timing, we have gone on the defensive and negative cricket breeds dismissal. The bowlers arc short of lead-up match practice and let's face it, we are playing against a powerful side. I will certainly recommend to the Australian Cricket Board that we don't tour again out of season. We will have to make sure we come here in 1988 at the end of the Sheffield Shield season.

Imran Khan was man of the match. Geoff Lawson was Australia's man of the series and Abdul Qadir was Pakistan's.

=== 3rd ODI: Pakistan v Australia at Karachi, Oct 22, 1982 ===
22 October 1982
Scorecard

Pakistan; 44/1 (12 overs)	v	Australia
Mohsin Khan 25* (39); TM Alderman 1/22 (6 overs)

No result
National Stadium, Karachi
Umpires: Amanullah Khan and Shakoor Rana

- Australia won the toss and elected to field.
- WB Phillips (AUS) made his ODI debut.

Australia's team for the 3rd ODI saw Ian Callen return to the Australian side (replacing Ray Bright – Australia went for an all pace attack) and Wayne Phillips made his ODI debut as an opener.

Fifteen minutes into the game Geoff Lawson was seen throwing a stone back into the crowd while fielding at long leg. Hughes and the umpires spoke to him and after lengthy conversations, and a plea from Hughes to the stands for calm, decided to carry on. However items continued to be thrown from the stands. When Pakistan were 1-39, Lawson was hit on the leg, and Hughes led his players from the field. For almost an hour Hughes discussed possibly abandoning the game with Imran, managers and officials, but eventually, at the urging of Australian manager Col Egar, the Australians decided to return.

Within an over, Pakistan were 1-44. Items began being thrown again and Greg Ritchie was hit. Hughes led his team from the field, this time for good. The Australians were evacuated from the stadium, then it was announced the game was abandoned. The crowd turned on the police, attacking them with stones and seats ripped up from the stands, and setting light to the canvas awnings used as protection from the sun. The police responded with baton charges and tear gas. The conflict spilled into the streets surrounding the stadium. Rioters even prevented fire engines from reaching the ground.

Pakistan authorities used volunteers at the stadium instead of police, keeping police in reserve. "If the authorities are too frightened to use police inside the ground then we are too frightened to play cricket", said Col Egar.

Rod Marsh later said he "asked around and people in the know said the mob had nothing against us personally. No, they were protesting because they wanted a new grandstand built at the ground. They've a funny way of expressing themselves in Pakistan."

Australia flew home via Singapore from Karachi on the morning of 23 October 1982. They were seen off at the airport by their liaison officer, Talat Ali.

== Summary ==
The series was seen as a triumph for Pakistan, who played without Sarfraz Nawaz. Imran Khan and Abdul Qadir bowled particularly well, with the latter taking 22 wickets, a record for a series against Australia. According to Wisden:

His remarkable dexterity, variety and accuracy, usually exploited from round the wicket, to find boot marks at the other end, caused the Australians such difficulties that it made his absence from the team which had visited Australia the previous summer all the more inexplicable. His success was achieved, moreover, against batsmen who prided themselves on their ability to cope with the ball tossed into the air and turning from leg. Qadir's ability to turn the ball sharply in both directions eroded the Australians' patience and confidence and frustrated their desires to advance down the pitch to get the better of him.

Qadir received strong support from Iqbal Qasim and together they took 30 of the 56 Australian wickets to fall to bowlers in the three Tests. Pakistan also batted particularly well, especially openers Mohsin Khan and Mudassar Nazar, with strong support from Zaheer Abbas, Mansoor Akhtar, and Javed Miandad.

"They played very good cricket", wrote Marsh. "Percentage cricket."

Peter McFarline wrote "It is not unfair to say that there must now be question marks besides the name of Graeme Wood, Bruce Laird, indeed Hughes and Allan Border as well as bowlers Jeff Thomson, Bruce Yardley and Ray Bright." (Laird would never play cricket for Australia again.)

Wisden called fast bowler Geoff Lawson "the outstanding Australian... his spirit was undaunted by the failures of his fellow players, and he remained the one bowler to trouble the Pakistanis in all conditions throughout the series." Australia's spinners only took six test wickets between them, although Australia did drop fifteen catches throughout the series. "It all amounted to a tour to rank among the most dismal ever made by an Australian side", said Wisden.

"It is almost too painful to recall what happened to us on the field in Pakistan", wrote Rod Marsh. "We thought like losers, we played like losers. And we lost everything we attempted."

Rod Marsh later claimed to have lived off Australian beer and canned fruit that was shipped into the country. He says players amused themselves by watching in-house television movies and setting off fireworks.

== Controversies ==
Riots in the crowd caused Kim Hughes to twice lead the Australian team from the field during the first test, and also to abandon the third one-day international.

Kim Hughes wanted to continue to captain Australia full-time. However Greg Chappell was reappointed Australian captain for the 1982–83 Ashes.

In October 1982 Ian Chappell wrote "maybe the Australian Cricket Board will now believe me when I say: 'Kim Hughes isn't the best man for the job of Australian captain'. Because of the Board's unwillingness to back down and admit that a decision it made in 1979 was wrong, the Australian team has been made to suffer a number of disasters that could be avoided. Hughes, along with Graham Yallop, has done for Australian captaincy what Mrs. Miller did for female vocalists in the 1960s. The time has come for the board to swallow its pride, thank Hughes for his efforts, and start grooming for Allan Border to take over from Greg Chappell."

Chappell did think the form of Geoff Lawson and Greg Ritchie were two positives but thought the "biggest disappointment" was the performance of Peter Sleep and felt Stuart Saunders may be in the running the play England. Chappell wrote "all in all, Pakistan has not quite been the disaster it first appears in the record books, except if your name is Kim Hughes."
