= Peter Sleep =

Australian cricketer

Personal information
- Full name: Peter Raymond Sleep
- Born: 4 May 1957 (age 69); Penola, South Australia
- Batting: Right-handed
- Bowling: Right-arm legspin, googly
- Role: All-rounder

International information
- National side: Australia
- Test debut (cap 303): 10 March 1979 v Pakistan
- Last Test: 12 January 1990 v Pakistan

Domestic team information
- Years: Team
- 1976/77–1992/1993: South Australia

Career statistics
Competition	Test	FC	LA
Matches	14	175	33
Runs scored	483	8,201	956
Batting average	24.15	34.89	38.24
100s/50s	0/3	15/40	1/4
Top score	90	182	109
Balls bowled	2,982	28,063	168
Wickets	31	363	4
Bowling average	45.06	39.39	44.25
5 wickets in innings	1	9	0
10 wickets in match	0	0	0
Best bowling	5/72	8/133	2/58
Catches/stumpings	4/–	104/1	12/–
- Source: CricketArchive, 5 October 2013

Peter Raymond Sleep (born 4 May 1957) is a former Australian cricketer who played 14 Test matches for Australia between 1979 and 1990.

Nicknamed "Sounda", Sleep made his national debut during the World Series Cricket period, and although his performances were not high, Sleep publicly reported that he had turned down a $15,000/year offer to play for World Series Cricket.

He was a leg spinner who was in and out of the team, rarely playing two games in succession although, after taking ten wickets in the 1986–87 Ashes series, he was retained for the next four Tests after the series before falling out of favour again.

The 1986–87 series which included his best bowling figures in a Test innings, five for 72 in the second innings of the fifth test as England failed to chase 320 for the win.

However, Sleep was part of an Australian generation of spinners with bowling averages above 40 (for comparison, the first choice leg spinners in 2006, Shane Warne and Stuart MacGill, both averaged below 30 with the ball), also including Tom Hogan, Murray Bennett and Tony Mann, and the cricket website Cricinfo summed up his career as a "relatively anodyne slow bowler". Sleep himself describes his test career as "mediocre".

== Early career ==
Peter Sleep made his first class debut in 1976–77 while still a teenager. In only his second game he took part in a 159 run partnership with David Hookes against Queensland.

In 1977–78 a number of Australian players were banned from playing first class cricket due to signing with World Series Cricket, including the two leading spinners in the country, Kerry O'Keeffe and Ray Bright. The spinners chosen to play for Australia that summer included Tony Mann, Jim Higgs and Bruce Yardley. Sleep scored 363 runs at summer at an average of 40 and took 15 wickets at 31.46. However it was Yardley and Higgs who were chosen to the West Indies, where both acquitted themselves well.

== First Stint as Test Player ==
=== 1978-79 Summer ===
Sleep's breakthrough season came in the summer of 1978-79, when Australian was being toured by England and Pakistan. Sleep was not selected for any tests against England, which Australia lost 5-1; the preferred choices as spinners were Bruce Yardley and Jim Higgs.

However Sleep had a very strong domestic summer. In a SA vs NSW game, Sleep took 6–94 and scored 91 which saw him in the frame for test selection. He followed this up with 5–24 in 13 overs against Queensland.

By this stage Sleep had received an offer to play World Series Cricket which he turned down. He had scored almost 600 runs at an average of more than 35 and taken 42 wickets at 23 runs each in the Shield. Australia had to play a two match series against Pakistan and the selectors decided to make changes for the first test. Batsman Peter Toohey, spinner Bruce Yardley and all-rounder Phil Carlson were replaced with batsman Dav Whatmore, a medium pace all rounder Trevor Laughlin and Sleep. (Later on Laughlin had to withdraw due to injury and was replaced by Wayne Clark.)

Bill O'Reilly said Sleep "shows at this stage of his career more potential than Richie Benaud did at a comparable stage in his."

In Sleep's first test, strong bowling from Rodney Hogg and Alan Hurst put Australia in a strong position to win the game. However chasing in the second innings, Australia's batsmen collapsed from 3–305 to be all out for 310, taking Pakistan to victory. Sleep was not successful with the ball or bat, taking 1–16 and 1–62 (off eight overs) and scoring 10 and 0.

The Australian selectors responded to this loss by making mass changes to the side for the next test match – something they had done throughout the summer: Graeme Wood, Wayne Clark, Jim Higgs and Peter Sleep were dropped for Rick Darling, Trevor Laughlin, Bruce Yardley and Geoff Dymock.

Sleep was voted the Sheffield Shield player of the year. He ended the summer having scored 657 runs at 32 and taken 47 wickets at 27. (He would never take so many first class wickets in a season again.)

=== 1979 Tour of India ===
Sleep was selected on the 1979 tour to India. He was one of three spinners in the squad, the others being Jim Higgs and Bruce Yardley. This meant Sleep had to break a contract he had signed with the Lancashire League, and Sleep was fined.

Sleep began the Indian tour slowly but took five wickets against South Zone. According to the Canberra Times "three of them [the wickets] were from loose deliveries which a batsman of Gavaskar's class would put away. He does have the happy knack of taking wickets with bad balls, but there are doubts about his ability to bowl tightly enough against batsmen who were brought up playing spin bowling."

He later took 5–71 and made a fifty against Central Zone, which put him in the frame for selection in the Australian team for the third test. He did not achieve this but was selected in the team for the 4th test, where he took no wickets but scored 64 in Australia's second innings, helping Australia draw. Sleep took part in two crucial partnerships: 76 with Dav Whatmore and 51 with Geoff Dymock. "He will never hit a better 64 in his life" said contemporary reports.

Bruce Yardley's return from illness saw Sleep relegated to 12th man for the fifth test. He was next used in the sixth test, taking no wickets and making four runs, though he did suffer stomach cramps throughout the game.

== Test Wilderness and Brief Recall ==
On his return to Australia, Sleep was unable to force himself back into the test side at home or in the tour of Pakistan, the selectors preferring to select Ray Bright, Graeme Beard and Jim Higgs. In 1979-80 he made 514 first class runs at 34.26 and took 19 wickets at 36.78.

In 1980 he scored 663 runs at 41 and took 22 wickets at 34, but was overlooked for the 1981 Ashes in favour of Bright and Beard.

In 1981-82 Sleep scored 438 first class runs at 29.20 and took 26 wickets at 33.76, being an important part of South Australia's Sheffield Shield winning team.

Sleep's consistent performances at first class level saw him selected on Australia's 1982 tour of Pakistan. "I have something to prove this time," said Sleep, "both to myself and to the selectors. I'll just do my best in Pakistan and hope to establish myself. I think a leg spinner has more to offer than an off spinner particularly a leg spinner who can bat. The spinner who bats better than the other will obviously be first choice."

An illness to Bruce Yardley saw Sleep picked to play in the second test, where he took 1–158 and scored 30 runs over two innings. He was replaced in the third test by Terry Alderman. He took one first class wicket on tor with an average of 246.00.

In 1982-83 Sleep made 272 runs at 22.66 and took 21 wickets at 32.80. Bruce Yardley and Tom Hogan were Australia's chosen spinners. Sleep was dropped from the South Australian side for a time. In September 1983 Sleep said he might have to retire or move interstate if he could not secure a guaranteed income from playing cricket. "The SACA has got a few favourites but I'm not one of them," he said.

In 1983-84 he made 486 runs at 54.00 and took 24 wickets at 46.00. Australia's selectors went with Tom Hogan, Greg Matthews and Murray Bennett as spinning options. Ian Chappell thought the selectors should have taken Peter Sleep to the West Indies in 1984 but Sleep was overlooked in favour of Matthews and Hogan.

He did not play first class cricket in 1984-85, in order that he could concentrate on his job of coaching the District Club team Sailsbury. That season Bob Holland emerged as Australia's first choice spinning option. David Hookes persuaded Sleep to return to South Australia the following summer to cover the retirement of John Inverarity. Sleep made 105 on his first Shield game back. "The rest did me a world of good," said Sleep.

Sleep had a strong 1985–86 season batting wise, making 793 runs at 44, but did less well with the ball, taking 17 wickets at 55.47. Greg Matthews and Ray Bright were preferred as Australia's spinners for the home summer and tours of New Zealand and India.

== Established Test Player ==
=== 1986-87 Ashes ===
Sleep began the 1986-87 season strongly, making 103 and taking 7-132 against Queensland. He credited this in part to the coaching of John Inverarity. Greg Matthews suffered a drop in form after returning home from India and Sleep was recalled for the second test side. He was 12th man for that game but played in the third test team, taking 4–132 in England's first innings.

In the 4th test Sleep took 1–61 and made 16 runs. However he was kept on for the fifth test, where his 5–72 in the second innings helped bowl Australia to victory.

Sleeps first class figures that summer were 408 runs at 24.00 and 30 wickets at 32.03. He missed out on selection in Australia's World Cup Squad in favour of Peter Taylor and Tim May.

=== 1987–88 Summer ===
During the 1987–88 summer Sleep played the first test against New Zealand. He took no wickets but his first innings knock of 39 was Australia's second highest score and helped them to a rare victory.

In the second test he took 1–109 and 3–61 plus a score of 62 with the bat. For the third test Sleep top scored in Australia's first innings with 90 (helping Australia put on a good total when coming in at 5-121) but only took 0–31 and 3–107 with the ball; his second innings of 20 helped Australia escape with a draw. "I think I have turned the corner as an all rounder," said Sleep after his 90.

For the Bicentennial test he took 2–114 and made 41 in Australia's first innings, the second highest score.

Sleep made 775 runs that summer at 40.78 and took 32 wickets at 46.21. He kept his place in the Australian side on the 1988 tour of Pakistan.

=== 1988: Tour of Pakistan ===
Sleep took five wickets in a tour match against the BCCP XI but was overlooked in favour of Tim May for the first test.

Sleep was picked in the second test and took two wickets in the first innings.

Sleep was not selected in the Australian side over the 1988-89 summer as the selectors went for Trevor Hohns and Tim May. They were the spinners chosen on the 1989 tour of England. In 1988/89 Sleep made 587 runs at 41.92 and took 14 first class wickets at 63.92.

=== 1989–90 Summer vs Sri Lanka and Pakistan ===
Sleep's next test was in 1989–90 against Sri Lanka where he made an important contribution to an Australian victory, top scoring in Australia's first innings with 47 and taking five wickets. For Sleep's last test, against Pakistan, he took two wickets and made 20 runs in all.

That summer he made 376 runs at 26.85 and took 22 wickets at 47.95.

== Post-Test career ==
Sleep was also a regular league professional in England and towards the end of his career was captain of Lancashire 2nd XI.

In 1991 he broke the Lancashire league batting record, held for 40 years by Everton Weekes with 1,621 runs. In 1995 he helped Rishton to win the league for the first time since the 1950s. He captained and coached the Lancashire 2nd XI to a championship where he worked with a young Andrew Flintoff.

In 1990-91 Sleep was dropped from South Australia after taking only four wickets at an average of 98. He was back in the team in December 1991 after some strong performances at domestic level. South Australian coach Peter Philpott said ""Peter's future Shield career will now depend on whether he's good enough to bowl leg-spinners at this level and get results. It will be dependent on that, not on his batting. If he can't do it we'll have to look elsewhere."

South Australia awarded Sleep a testimonial year in 1991/92, only the second time in South Australian cricket a player had been awarded a testimonial year (the first was David Hookes in 1990/91).

In more recent years, Sleep was captain-coach of Yahl Cricket Club in the Mount Gambier District Cricket Association and has recently transferred to Tea Tree Gully Cricket Club in the South Australian Grade Cricket League.

He was the proprietor of a hotel named "The Wickets" in Rishton, Lancashire until 2009.

Sleep has coached for a number of years. In 2014 the website for the Darren Lehmann Cricket Academy said he had been coaching batting and bowling there for four years.
