= Greg Ritchie =

Australian cricketer (born 1960)

Personal information
- Full name: Gregory Michael Ritchie
- Born: 23 January 1960 (age 66); Stanthorpe, Queensland
- Batting: Right-handed
- Bowling: Right-arm medium

International information
- National side: Australia
- Test debut (cap 315): 22 September 1982 v Pakistan
- Last Test: 10 January 1987 v England
- ODI debut (cap 68): 8 October 1982 v Pakistan
- Last ODI: 5 April 1987 v India

Domestic team information
- Years: Team
- 1980/81–1991/92: Queensland

Career statistics
Competition	Test	ODI
Matches	30	44
Runs scored	1,690	959
Batting average	35.20	27.39
100s/50s	3/7	0/6
Top score	146	84
Balls bowled	6	–
Wickets	0	–
Bowling average	–	–
5 wickets in innings	–	–
10 wickets in match	–	–
Best bowling	–	–
Catches/stumpings	14/–	9/–
- Source: CricInfo, 12 December 2005

Gregory Michael Ritchie (born 23 January 1960) is a former Australian international cricketer who played in 30 Test matches and 44 One Day Internationals between 1982 and 1987.

Ritchie played for Queensland between 1980 and 1992. He scored 10,170 runs in his first class cricket career at an average of 44.21 including 24 centuries and 54 fifties. In 2000 he was named as one of the seven greatest Sheffield Shield run scorers in Queensland history for amassing over 6,000 runs for his state.

== International career ==
Ritchie was affectionately known as "Fat Cat" due to his burly build. He was selected for Australia's 1982-83 tour of Pakistan as a middle-order batsman replacement for Greg Chappell. He scored his first century, 106 not out, in his second Test at Faisalabad. He was unable to force his way into the Australia team over the 1982–83 and 1983-84 summers but was picked on the 1984 tours of the West Indies and India and made the Australian team over the 1984-85 summer. He was a fixture in the middle order between 1985 and 1987 that included the 1985 The Ashes tour to England, where he scored his highest score 146 at Nottingham, the 1986 tours of New Zealand and India, and the 1986-87 England tour of Australia.

He was famously referred to by Allan Border at the 1986 Madras Tied Test versus India. Batsman Dean Jones was contemplating going off "retired ill" after vomiting at the crease and Border suggested that "a tough Queenslander" (Ritchie) could hack the conditions instead. Jones stayed on and scored a double century.

== Career ==
Ritchie made his first class debut in 1980–81, playing for Queensland against Victoria. He batted once, scoring 7. However he impressed in his third match, a tour game against New Zealand, where his second innings 47 helped save the game. He then made 74 against South Australia and an innings of 75 against the touring Indians saw him discussed as a potential future test player. He followed this up with his debut first class century, 140 against Victoria.

Ritchie impressed again during the 1981–82 season with 55 and 71 against the touring West Indies, then the best team in the world. 126 and 103 against South Australia saw him discussed again as a test candidate.

Towards the end of the summer he was placed on stand by for Kim Hughes in Australia's one day team. He did not play in the end.

Ritchie was overlooked for the Australian tour to New Zealand in early 1982. However a century against Tasmania helped ensure his selection on the 1982 tour to Pakistan. Ritchie finished the season with 839 first class runs in ten games at an average of 59.

=== 1982 Tour of Pakistan ===
The leading batsmen on the tour were Kim Hughes, Allan Border, Bruce Laird, John Dyson and Graeme Wood. Ritchie and Wayne Phillips were the two young batsmen. "They will be given every opportunity for the tests", said Hughes.

59 against the Pakistan Cricket Board XI impressed and Ritchie was picked to make his test debut. He scored 4 and 17. During the game he threw a stone at an umpire to demonstrate what was being thrown at him from the crowd.

Ritchie kept his spot in the team for the second test, although there was some talk he would be replaced by Peter Sleep. His maiden test century was the one bright spot of Australia's defeat. However he failed twice in the third test, making 26 and 18.

Ritchie was hit by projectiles while fielding at third man during the 3rd ODI, which was abandoned.

Ritchie kept his place in the Australian team to play England in the first test. However also in the twelve was David Hookes who was in very good form. Despite 67 and 46 against Tasmania, Ritchie was made 12th man for the first test. Ritchie was picked in the team for the second test but was again made twelfth man. He was not picked in the squad for the remainder of the summer.

That summer was a disappointing one for Ritchie, despite 55 against Victoria. He was unable to force his way into the Australian test or one day teams, and was overlooked for selection on the tour to Sri Lanka. However he was picked in a Young Australian team to tour Zimbabwe.

Ritchie played well on the Zimbabwe tour, scoring 69 against Zimbabwe.

Ritchie undertook a fitness campaign over the winter and lost several kilos. He began the 1983–84 summer brilliantly scoring 196 for Queensland against the touring Pakistan team. He followed this with four half centuries, and at one stage his first class run tally for the season was 451 at an average of 112. He then scored centuries against Victoria and NSW.

"My motto now is runs first; and lunch later", Ritchie said. "I think my winter fitness campaign is paying off. I'm more confident and I think my approach to the game is more mature... Now I put more value on my wicket and try to make the bowlers work hard for it."

He was selected in the Prime Ministers XI and got back in the Australian one day team. He was also selected for the 1984 tour of the West Indies. Ritchie was injured towards the end of the summer and there was some doubt he might make the tour but he recovered in time.

Ritchie played in all five tests. He started the tour well with 64 against Guyana.

His best performance came in the first when he scored 78. He also made 57 in the third test.

One notable incident on the tour had Ritchie and Wayne Phillips miss the beginning of a tour game because they slept in. He scored 99 against Barbados.

Ritchie was selected on the short one-day-international tour of India. He made 59 in the last game, the only one Ritchie played.

Ritchie started the 1985-85 summer with a century against Victoria for Queensland. However he was overlooked for the first two tests against the West Indies. He was put on stand-by for the third test as a possible back up for Allan Border, who was injured – but in the end he managed to play.

Ritchie replaced Kim Hughes for the fifth test. He was injured while batting but managed to complete his innings of 37.

Ritchie was picked in the Australian one day team. He was also selected to tour England in 1985.

Ritchie also batted in the famous 1984/85 Sheffield Shield final, narrowly lost by Queensland against New South Wales.

Ritchie began the Ashes well with 72 in the first tour game, 100 against Sussex. and 115 against Leicestershire.

He was picked in the first test. He scored 46 in the first innings but dropped Tim Robinson when the latter was on 22; Robinson went on to score a century. "Ritchie is Australia's greatest liability in the field, whether in a catching position or in the deep", said one reporter. He scored 1 in the second innings.

Ritchie redeemed himself in the second test, his first innings score of 94 helping lay the platform for an Australian victory. He went on to score a century in the third test. He took part in a partnership with Border in the 4th test that helped secure a draw.

Australia went on to lose the last two tests disastrously. However Ritchie was one of the few Australians to show fight – his second innings score of 20 off 102 balls almost helped Australia save the game. In the last test he made 64 in the first innings. In between the games he made 155 against Kent.

At the end of the tour, Allan Border said that Ritchie and Craig McDermott were the only players who could be really happy with their performances.

Ritchie started the 1985–86 season well with 86 against Victoria and kept his place for the first test against New Zealand. He failed twice in Australia's defeat, but was kept on for the second test.

Ritchie's batting in the first innings, a score of 89, was crucial for a rare Australian win. He made a fighting 44 in the third test, which Australia lost.

Ritchie scored his first test century on Australian soil with 128 against India in Adelaide. However he injured himself moving timber at his Brisbane home and was unable to play in the second test; his place was taken by Steve Waugh.

Ritchie was initially picked in Australia's one day squad over the summer and scored a match winning 68 against New Zealand. However his form faded away and he was omitted from the squad after suffering a groin injury. Nonetheless, he kept his place in the Australian team for the tour to New Zealand.

Ritchie arrived in New Zealand with the Australian squad in February 1986. He was injured during training after being hit on the toe from a ball by Craig McDermott. However he scored 66 not out in Australia's victory over Auckland.

Ritchie batted well in the first test, scoring 92 and taking part in a 213 run partnership with Greg Matthews.

He failed in the second test and scored 80 in a tour game. Ritchie scored 56 in the third test but failed in the second innings as Australia crashed to another defeat.

In the one day series that followed, Ritchie took part in a 90-ball 100 run partnership with Greg Matthews in the final game.

Ritchie then went to Sharjah for a short tour by an Australian team led by Ray Bright.

Ritchie was selected in the squad to tour India. He made a duck in the first game but scored 125 off 124 balls opening against Bombay and 95 against Young India.

In the famous second tied test, Ritchie made 13 and 28. He didn't bat in the second test and made 31 in the third.

In the third one-day international, Ritchie scored 75 off 53 balls.

Ritchie was picked in the Australian team for the first test of the Ashes that summer. He scored 41 and 45.

He made 141 against Victoria and made 33 and 24 off 139 balls in the second test. The third test saw Ritchie make 34 and 46 not out in the second innings, helping draw the game.

Ritchie was then left out of the Australian one day team and was made 12th man for the fourth test so Australia could play an extra bowler. (Allan Border later said he wanted Ritchie to play but was overruled by the selectors.)

Ritchie was picked in the squad for the fifth test and asked Allan Border if he could open with Geoff Marsh. Border agreed but Ritchie only scored 8 and 13.

Ritchie was not picked in the Australian one day squad. He made 96 against Tasmania and was back in the squad. He earned selection on the tour to Sharjah. However he was omitted from the World Cup squad.

Ritchie was unable to force his way back into the Australian team. He broke a long century drought in January 1988 with 100 against New South Wales. That summer he also undertook a promotional walk while injured.

Ritchie was involved in an incident on a domestic flight on the way to playing WA for the Sheffield Shield final when then-Queensland-teammate Ian Botham assaulted a fellow passenger. He was summonsed to appear in front of a Perth Magistrate for offensive behaviour. Botham pleaded guilty to a similar change but Ritchie pleaded not guilty. The charge was then dismissed. Queensland lost the final to WA.

In 1988-89 Ritchie was appointed Queensland vice captain, and led the team on a number of occasions. He scored 114 in an FAI Cup match against Victoria and his innings of 60 in the Cup Final was crucial in helping Queensland win.

His form was so good there was some talk Ritchie might make the 1989 Ashes squad. "I think it's not really up to me to give an opinion," he said. "It's like me saying 'you've done a good job as a journo, how do you rate your promotion prospects?' — you're not going to answer that... [But] I'm playing better cricket than I ever have before. This season I've gone out to simply enjoy the game and I don't really care about selections. In the past I've put too much pressure on myself and I've always felt like I had to perform to keep getting selected."

Allan Border stood down as Queensland captain at the beginning of the 1989/90 season in favour of Ritchie. "I've, been fortunate enough to have played under the best captains around. in A. B. [Border] and Greg Chappell, and hopefully I can draw on those experiences", said Ritchie. Highlights of the summer included 123 against the touring Pakistan team and 213 against South Australia. Queensland made the Sheffield Shield final but lost to NSW. Ritchie enjoyed a lot of success with the bat making 928 first class runs at an average of 54.

In 1990 there were reports of moves to remove Ritchie as Queensland captain. Ritchie wound up retiring from cricket. Moves were made to get Ritchie to come back to the team by new coach Jeff Thomson and QCA chief executive Barry Richards.

Ritchie returned to first class cricket at the beginning of the 1991–92 season. After a slow start to the season he scored a century against Western Australia. Ritchie then retired again, this time for good.

== After cricket ==
Ritchie was well known outside cricket as an after-dinner speaker and a travel agent. He also had a successful post-cricket media career which was acerbic and controversial. Wearing Blackface, he played a comedy character, a supposed Punjabi Sikh called Mahatma Cote, on Channel Nine's The Footy Show, which was highly racist and xenophobic, this was also done on The Footy Show as well as other sports radio comedy chat segments. From 2001 to 2004, he was a host for the Triple M Brisbane breakfast show.

In 2008, Ritchie was working as a commentator on the PGA golf tour.

== Controversies ==
In 1997, Ritchie was involved in a homophobic incident with Ansett Australia staff before and during a flight which he was subsequently removed from. He was forced to publicly apologise for the incident and is believed to have lost his regular media appearances on the Nine Network.

In 2006, Ritchie was involved in another in-flight incident. The former cricketer was detained by the US Department of Homeland Security after a drunken incident on board a flight to Florida to visit then girlfriend Rachel Hetherington. Despite being arrested for 'inappropriate behaviour' and detained for suspicion of interference with crew which was a Federal Offence, he was let off with a warning and not prevented from entering the country in the future.

In 2012, Ritchie caused controversy over racist and Islamophobic comments at a luncheon during the First Test between Australia and South Africa at the Adelaide Oval; after South African team officials complained (the team contained four Muslim and two black African players), Ritchie was effectively banned by Cricket Australia from functions for the rest of the 2012–13 season.
