= Wayne Clark (cricketer) =

Australian cricketer

Personal information
- Full name: Wayne Maxwell Clark
- Born: 19 September 1953 (age 73); Perth, Western Australia
- Batting: Right-handed
- Bowling: Right-arm fast-medium
- Role: Bowler

International information
- National side: Australia
- Test debut (cap 283): 2 December 1977 v India
- Last Test: 10 March 1979 v Pakistan
- Only ODI (cap 40): 22 February 1978 v West Indies

Domestic team information
- Years: Team
- 1973/74–1984/85: Western Australia

Career statistics
Competition	Test	ODI	FC	LA
Matches	10	2	62	29
Runs scored	98	–	717	21
Batting average	5.76	–	12.57	2.62
100s/50s	0/0	–	0/0	1/0
Top score	33	–	46*	8*
Balls bowled	2,793	100	14,579	607
Wickets	44	3	210	29
Bowling average	28.75	20.33	29.37	34.00
5 wickets in innings	0	0	6	0
10 wickets in match	0	0	1	0
Best bowling	4/46	2/39	7/26	4/20
Catches/stumpings	6/–	0/–	23/–	5/–
- Source: CricInfo, 4 September 2012

Wayne Maxwell Clark (born 19 September 1953) is a former Australian cricketer who played in 10 Test matches and two One Day Internationals from 1977 to 1979.

== Playing career ==
Born in Perth, Western Australia, Clark made his first-class debut for Western Australia in 1974–75 and replaced fellow fast bowler Mick Malone for a game in 1975–76. However he was not a regular member of the West Australian team until 1976–77 when he took 25 wickets at 26.96.

In his first eight first class games Clark took 30 wickets at an average of 28. He was part of the West Australian attack who defeated Queensland in a Gillette Cup semi-final, defending 77.

=== International Career: 1977–78 vs India ===
Clark's efforts saw him receive an offer from Kerry Packer to be a part of World Series Cricket (WSC). He eventually turned it down, with Clark's business adviser Bert Hewitt saying a "sense of sporting patriotism and loyalty" was the overriding factor behind the decision.

Clark took eight wickets in the first two games of the 1977–78 summer at 32.63 and was rewarded by selection in the Australian side against India for the first Test. The bowling attack consisted of fast bowlers Clark, Jeff Thomson, Alan Hurst and spinner Tony Mann. Clark had an excellent game, taking 4–46 in the first innings (including the wickets of Sunil Gavaskar and Mohinder Amarnath) and 4–101 in the second (including Gavaskar again and Dilip Vengsarkar). His second innings knock of 12, including a 31 run partnership with Jeff Thomson, proved unexpectedly crucial as Australia won by 16 runs.

There were press reports about the legitimacy of Clark's action. "I don't know that all the fuss is about", said Indian captain Bishen Bedi. "None of our officials or players have said they consider Clark throws the ball – it's something that has been blown up by the Press".

Clark had a strong second Test, taking 2–95 and 2–83 (Gavaskar in both innings) with useful scores with the bat of 15 and 5 not out – the latter was important as he and Thomson chased down the 12 runs to win with two wickets in hand. He kept his place for the next two tests.

In the third Test Clark took 4–73 and 4–96, but Australia's batting was not as strong an India won by 222 runs (Clark's second innings score of 33 was Australia's second highest). He took 2–66 in the fourth Test, but India won by an innings and 2 runs. He suffered a bad back injury that saw him miss a Sheffield Shield game but recovered to play a Gillette Cup match against New South Wales, taking 4–20 off 7.2 overs and winning the man of the match award.

Australia fought back to win the 5th test. It was a difficult game for Australia's bowlers as Thomson broke down early in India's first innings. Clark took 4–62 and 2–79.

Clark took 28 wickets for the series, which was still the record for the most wickets taken in a series without taking 5 wickets in an innings until overtaken by Pat Cummins in the 2019 Ashes series in England. Wisden later reported that Clark "bowled an excellent line and length, even though called upon to do a lot of work. He invariably broke through with the new ball and had a splendid record of dismissing Gavaskar, the principal danger to the Australians."

His work earned him selection on the 1978 tour of the West Indies.

=== 1977–78 West Indies Tour ===
Clark played in four tests against the West Indies.

In the first test he took 0–41. The second 2–77 with reports saying he "bowled gallantly without luck." The third he got 4–65 and 4–124, helping set up Australia's sole test victory.

In a game against Windward Islands, Clark took a career best 12–70.

The fourth test Clark took 3–65 and 2–62 but Australia collapsed in the second innings and lost the game. Continually dogged by back trouble, Clark was rested for the game against Jamaica.

Clark was the centre of controversy during the tour when local umpire Douglas Sang Hue publicly expressed his doubts about the legality of Clark and teammate Bruce Yardley's bowling, although neither had ever been called for throwing before. This statement and the no balling of Yardley for throwing in a tour match led to Sang Hue's appointment to umpire the 5th and final Test of the series to be withdrawn, which in turn led to anger from the West Indian public who believed Sang Hue was replaced at the Australian team's request.

Clark took 31 first class wickets at 23.35 for the tour and 15 wickets at 30.73 for the Tests.

=== 1978–79 Summer ===
England toured Australia for the 1978–79 summer. At the beginning of the season English captain Mike Brearley said he expected Clark to be one of the players to give his team the most trouble. However Clark began the domestic season slowly and was replaced by Alan Hurst, Rodney Hogg and Geoff Dymock.

His form improved later in the summer taking 6–47 against South Australia, 5–54 against Victoria and 6–39 against Queensland. Clark returned to the Australian team for the first Test against Pakistan, replacing the injured Trevor Laughlin.

Clark took 1–56 and 0–47 in an Australian defeat. He was dropped for the second test in favour of Laughlin. He took 35 first-class wickets at 30.25 over the summer and was overlooked for the 1979 Cricket World Cup and tour of India.

=== Later career ===
Clark was not selected for the WA team at the start of the 1979–80 summer. However he forced his way back into the team and was part of Western Australia's Sheffield Shield winning sides in 1980–81 and 1983–84; he captained the side in some games. His best season was in 1982–83 when he took 31 wickets at 25.83.

== Coaching career ==
Clark was the coach of the Western Warriors. In January 2007, it was announced that Clark would step down from his role as Western Australian coach, a role he has had for ten seasons over two stints. He has guided Western Australia to two Pura Cups and 3 One Day Domestic championships in his tenure as coach.

He was also the coach of Yorkshire from 2001 to 2002 where he led them to their first County Championship title for 33 years in 2001. The following season were relegated from division one but still managed to win the C & G Trophy, a first Lord's final win since 1987. Yorkshire decided to restructure the coaching staff and Clark was offered the position of Bowling Coach for the 2003 season but declined and left the club at the end of 2002.

In 2010, Clark joined Perth radio station 91.3 SportFM's 'Sports Breakfast' team alongside Corbin Middlemas. Corbin has gone on to great things and Clark is still mentoring up and coming sports commentators. He provides expert commentary for their Sheffield Shield and One-Day broadcasts; in addition to streaming commentary with Cricket Australia

== Sources ==
- Robinson, R. (1979) The Wildest Tests, Cassell Australia: Sydney. ISBN 0 7269 7375 0.
