= Sew Shivnarine =

West Indian cricketer (born 1952)

Personal information
- Full name: Sewdatt Shivnarine
- Born: 13 May 1952 (age 74); Albion, Guyana
- Batting: Right-handed
- Bowling: Slow left-arm orthodox

International information
- National side: West Indies
- Test debut (cap 169): 31 March 1978 v Australia
- Last Test: 2 February 1979 v India
- Only ODI (cap 32): 12 April 1978 v Australia

Domestic team information
- Years: Team
- 1970–1981: Guyana
- 1971–1980: Berbice

Career statistics
Competition	Tests	ODIs	FC	LA
Matches	8	1	49	13
Runs scored	379	20	2,182	206
Batting average	29.15	–	32.56	18.72
100s/50s	0/4	0/0	3/14	0/0
Top score	63	20*	131*	46
Balls bowled	336	18	5,628	445
Wickets	1	0	67	9
Bowling average	167.00	–	36.55	32.00
5 wickets in innings	0	0	0	0
10 wickets in match	0	0	0	0
Best bowling	1/13	0/16	4/29	2/25
Catches/stumpings	6/–	0/–	36/–	6/–
- Source: Cricket Archive, 18 October 2010

Sewdatt Shivnarine (born 13 May 1952) is a Guyanese former cricketer who played in eight Tests and one One Day International (ODI) from 1978 to 1979 for West Indies. A right-hand batsman and left-arm orthodox spin bowler, his opportunity at international cricket occurred when West Indies World Series Cricket players withdrew midway through the series with Australia in 1978. In Test cricket, he scored four half-centuries and took a solitary wicket. In domestic cricket, he represented Guyana and Berbice between 1970–71 and 1980–81. He later emigrated to the United States and represented their national cricket team.

== Career ==
Shivnarine made his first-class debut for Guyana against Jamaica during the 1970–71 Shell Shield season. He took his career-best bowling figures of 4/29 from 22 overs against the touring Indian team in his next match. As well as Guyana he also represented Berbice in the annual Jones Cup against Demerara. Initially more of a bowler, his batting developed so from being a lower-order batsman he moved up the order. He scored his maiden first-class century against the Combined Leeward and Windward Islands in January 1977.

Shivnarine's opportunity at Test cricket arrived during the series with Australia in 1977–78. A disagreement between the West Indies selectors and captain Clive Lloyd led Lloyd to resign and the other World Series Cricket players refused to play in solidarity. A makeshift XI was selected for the third Test at short notice with Shivnarine one of six debutants chosen. He scored 53 in the first innings to help recover the score from 84/5 to a total of 205 and provided further resistance in the second innings contributing 63, his Test best. He bowled 28 wicketless overs in the match as Australia won by three wickets. He remained in the team for the last two Tests of the series, adding another fifty in the final match as well as taking his only Test wicket. He averaged 36.17 across his six innings in the series. Between the third and fourth Tests, Shivnarine made his ODI debut when Australia played in Saint Lucia.

On the tour of India starting in late 1978, Shivnarine featured in five of the six Tests but had limited success. He did help secure the draw in the third Test at Eden Gardens by batting over two hours in fading light, with Wisden praising his "imperturbable calm and watchfulness". Overall across the Tests he scored 162 runs at an average of 23.14, but did make two centuries in the tour matches including his highest first-class score of 131 not out against East Zone.

Shivnarine’s continued to play for Guyana until the 1980–81 season. He then emigrated to the United States for whom he represented in three ICC Trophy tournaments between 1986 and 1994. Subsequently acting as a coach and selector for the USA.
