= Dav Whatmore =

Australian cricketer and coach

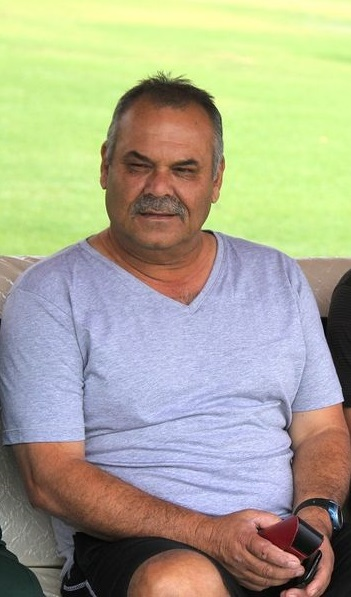
- Whatmore in May 2013

Personal information
- Full name: Davenell Frederick Whatmore
- Born: 16 March 1954 (age 72); Colombo, Dominion of Ceylon
- Batting: Right-handed
- Role: Batsman

International information
- National side: Australia (1979–1980)
- Test debut (cap 304): 10 March 1979 v Pakistan
- Last Test: 3 November 1979 v India
- Only ODI (cap 59): 18 January 1980 v West Indies

Head coaching information
- Years: Team
- 1995–1996, 1999–2003: Sri Lanka
- 1998-99: Lancashire
- 2003–2007: Bangladesh
- 2007-2008: India under-19
- 2010-2011: Kolkata Knight Riders
- 2012-2014: Pakistan
- 2024: Fortune Barishal
- 2014-2016: Zimbabwe

Career statistics
Competition	Test	ODI	FC	LA
Matches	7	1	108	26
Runs scored	293	2	6,116	464
Batting average	22.53	2.00	33.97	19.33
100s/50s	0/2	0/0	10/35	0/2
Top score	77	2	170	99
Balls bowled	30	–	275	6
Wickets	0	–	4	1
Bowling average	–	–	27.25	3.00
5 wickets in innings	–	–	0	0
10 wickets in match	–	–	0	0
Best bowling	–	–	1/0	1/3
Catches/stumpings	13/–	0/–	146/–	8/–
Medal record
Men's Cricket
Representing Sri Lanka as coach
ICC Cricket World Cup
Winner	1996 India-Pakistan-Sri Lanka
- Source: ESPNcricinfo, 30 December 2014

Davenell Frederick Whatmore (born 16 March 1954) is a Sri Lanka born Australian cricket coach and former cricketer.

A right-handed batsman, Whatmore played seven Test matches for Australia in 1979, and one One Day International in 1980. At first-class level, he scored over 6,000 runs for Victoria. Since the 1990s, Whatmore has coached several national cricket teams including the Sri Lanka, Bangladesh, Pakistan and Nepal. He was the head coach of Sri Lanka when Sri Lanka won the Cricket World Cup in 1996, and when Sri Lanka was one of the dual-winners of the 2002 ICC Champions Trophy, along with India.

He also served as the coach of the Zimbabwe team before being sacked for poor performances in 2016 ICC World Twenty20 .

== Early life ==
Whatmore was born in Colombo, Dominion of Ceylon (now known as Sri Lanka) and was educated at Royal College, Colombo. He and his family migrated to Australia in 1962. Thereafter he lived in Mentone, a suburb of Melbourne and studied at Mentone Grammar School.

== Playing career ==
Whatmore made his first class debut in 1975–76 touring South Africa with a Derek Robins XI. He debuted for Victoria at the end of that summer and in the next season became an important part of the Victorian team, being appointed vice captain under Graham Yallop.

Whatmore's first century came against South Australia which he followed with one against New South Wales.

Whatmore started the 1978–79 domestic season slowly, but eventually found form and became one of the most successful batsman that season. He also had to captain Victoria when Yallop was absent due to Test duty, and played a vital role in the state winning the Sheffield Shield that summer.

=== International career ===
A century against Queensland late in the season saw him selected in the Australian team to play Pakistan, replacing Peter Toohey.

Whatmore impressed in his first test, top scoring in Australia's first innings with 43. He had to open in the second innings when Graeme Wood was unfit but only scored 15.

Whatmore was picked in the Australian squad for the 1979 World Cup.

He was also selected in the side that toured India in 1979. Whatmore's main challenger for a position in the side appears to have been Graeme Wood. Illness to Rick Darling saw both selected – Whatmore scored 20 and 8.

Whatmore was dropped for the second test but 60 in a tour game saw him back in the team for the third test. Whatmore made 14 and 33, the latter Australia's top score in the second innings.

Whatmore's best test batting came in the fourth test, with scores of 77 and 54; the latter knock was especially crucial as it helped Australia escape with a draw.

"He hits the ball cleanly and effortlessly and he's a natural shot maker", said captain Kim Hughes. "He's got the makings of a really top player."

However, in the fifth test Whatmore made 4 and 4 and in the 6th 6 and 0. When Whatmore returned to Australia the World Series Cricket players had been readmitted to first class cricket and Whatmore lost his test place. However, he remained in good form for Victoria, and helped them win another Sheffield Shield. He played one ODI for Australia in the 1979–80 summer, was 12th man for another and was selected in the initial 18-man squad to go to Pakistan in early 1980. (He did not end up going).

=== Later playing career ===
Whatmore suffered a dip in form in 1980–81 and 81–82 seasons and was dropped from the Sheffield Shield Squad at one stage. However he bounced back and enjoyed his best ever season in 1987–88, making 912 runs at an average of 50.

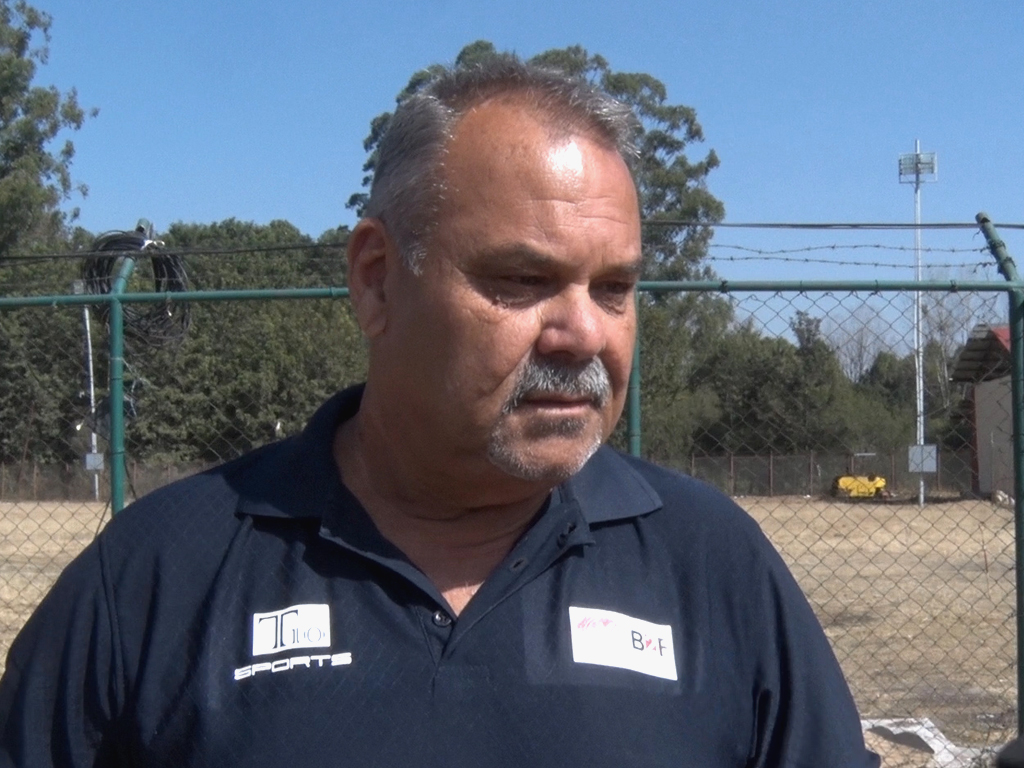
Dav Whatmore in Nepal 2017

== Coaching career ==
=== Sri Lanka ===
Whatmore retired from professional cricket in 1988/89 to pursue a career in coaching. He coached Sri Lanka in two separate spells, during the first of which he won the 1996 Cricket World Cup. In between those spells, he coached Lancashire where he won the National League in 1998 and 1999, and the NatWest Trophy in 1998.

=== Bangladesh ===
From 2002 to 2007, he had been coaching Bangladesh. Under his coaching, Bangladesh enjoyed relative success, coming from a side that could rarely win matches at all, to a team that can occasionally surprise even the most powerful cricketing nations. Whatmore coached them to their first Test match victory early in 2005. Bangladesh shocked the cricket world later that year with a victory over then top ranked Australia and then South Africa when they were top ranked during the 2007 World Cup, where they also defeated India to reach the Super 8 stage. Whatmore announced his resignation from the Bangladeshi team after the conclusion of their matches at the 2007 World Cup. He stayed on until the conclusion of their home series against India on 29 May.

=== Chances in England, India and Pakistan ===
After announcing his intentions to not renew his contract, Whatmore was not linked with the job of national cricket coaches of India in any way the same goes for England and Pakistan. But England named Peter Moores as their new coach while India appointed Ravi Shastri as the temporary national coach. Since Shastri declared that he was not interested in the job long-term, Whatmore was considered as a strong contender for the role of coach. During India's 2007 tour of Bangladesh, talks took place between him and BCCI officials, and although it seemed he was the favourite to get the job, on 4 June 2007, BCCI treasurer N Srinivasan, a member of the Search Committee announced that Graham Ford and John Emburey had been invited for talks, hinting that Dav Whatmore was not under consideration anymore. He was then appointed as the Director of the National Cricket Academy in 2007 and later took charge of the India under-19 team, which would go on to win the 2008 Under-19 Cricket World Cup in Malaysia with Virat Kohli leading the team.

Whatmore was one of the three men interviewed by the Pakistan Cricket Board for the coaching job of the national team, but Geoff Lawson was preferred for the job after former Sri Lankan captain Arjuna Ranatunga suggested to the PCB that they not choose Whatmore for the job. Whatmore had problems with Ranatunga in the past while he was the coach of the Sri Lankan national team and both of them used to speak against each other quite frequently in the media.

=== Indian Premier League ===
Whatmore was the coach of the Kolkata Knight Riders team from 2010 to 2011. In 2010, they finished 5th and were again eliminated in group stage. In 2011, they entered knockout stage as they were 4th in group stage, but lost to Mumbai Indians in the Eliminator. On 1 January 2012 he stepped down as the coach of the Kolkata Knight Riders.

=== Pakistan ===
On 4 March 2012, Pakistan Cricket Board appointed Whatmore as head coach of Pakistan (replacing interim coach Mohsin Khan) for a two-year signed contract. His first assignment was a successful one as Pakistan lifted the Asia Cup after beating Bangladesh in the Final. He left the coaching position when his contract ended in 2014. He was replaced by Moin Khan.

=== Zimbabwe ===
On 30 December 2014, Whatmore was appointed as head coach by the Zimbabwe Cricket Board. He was sacked on 31 May 2016 with 9 months remaining on his contract.

=== Kerala (India) ===
Dav Whatmore has been appointed as head coach by Kerala Cricket Association for 2017–18 season. During 2017–18 Ranji Trophy, Kerala's men's cricket team reached the quarter-final of Ranji Trophy for the first time. In 2018–19 Ranji Trophy, they moved a step ahead and for first time played in semi-finals. Dav Whatmore was credited for creating a long-standing impact on Kerala cricket.

=== Singapore ===
In February 2020, he was appointed as head coach of Singapore national cricket team.

=== Nepal ===
On 18 December 2020, he was appointed as head coach of the Nepal national cricket team by the Cricket Association of Nepal (CAN).On 27 August 2021, he resigned as the head coach of Nepal.

=== Vadodara (India) ===
On 22 September 2021, he was appointed as head coach of Baroda cricket team by the Baroda Cricket Association.
