= Adrian King (cricketer) =

West Indian cricketer

Personal information
- Full name: Adrian Anselm King
- Born: 8 March 1952 (age 74); Canouan, Saint Vincent
- Batting: Right-handed
- Bowling: Right-arm fast-medium

International information
- National side: Bermuda (1982–1983)

Domestic team information
- Years: Team
- 1973–1978: Windward Islands
- Source: CricketArchive, 2 February 2016

Adrian Anselm King (born 8 March 1952) is a West Indian former cricketer who played both for the Windward Islands in West Indian domestic cricket and for Bermuda internationally.

King was born in Canouan, Saint Vincent. He made his first-class debut for the Windwards in July 1973, in a friendly match against the Leeward Islands. King did not play at first-class level again for almost five years. He re-appeared in April 1978, against the touring Australians, and marked his return with a ten-wicket haul – 6/50 in the first innings and 4/34 in the second. Despite this performance, King never again played at first-class level, as later in the year he moved to Bermuda for his job as a policeman.

After several years of club cricket on the island, King was selected to make his international debut for Bermuda at the 1982 ICC Trophy, played in England. He played in all seven of his team's matches, and took eight wickets, which was the fourth-most for Bermuda (behind Elvin James, Winston Trott, and Noel Gibbons). His best performance, 3/23 from seven overs, came against Bangladesh, while he also recorded figures of 2/15 against Malaysia and 2/23 against Papua New Guinea. King last played for Bermuda in January 1983, in a series of a games against Jamaica. In the second of two four-day matches played, he took first-innings figures of 5/85, which included the wicket of West Indies international Jeff Dujon.

King's daughter, Arantxa King, represented Bermuda in track and field events at the 2012 Summer Olympics.
