= Graham Whyte =

Australian cricketer

Cricket information
- Batting: Right-handed
- Bowling: Right-arm off-spin

Career statistics
Competition	First-class	List A
Matches	44	9
Runs scored	1,033	58
Batting average	18.12	14.5
100s/50s	0/5	0/0
Top score	93	14
Balls bowled	6,752	204
Wickets	73	1
Bowling average	38.87	146
5 wickets in innings	1	0
10 wickets in match	0	0
Best bowling	6/65	1/36
Catches/stumpings	31/–	5/–
- Source: CricInfo, 21 April 2023

Graham Keith Whyte (29 March 1952 – January 2025) was a Queensland cricketer in the 1970s and 1980s. He was primarily an off-spinner although also a useful lower-order batsman. During World Series Cricket Whyte was occasionally spoken of as a possible Test candidate.

== Career ==
Whyte played club cricket for Norths in Brisbane, and was selected in the Queensland Country Colts and Colts team. In October 1972 he took 4-1 for Queensland Country Colts in a game against Queensland Metropolitan Colts.

Whyte made his first class debut in 1974–75. He took three wickets against the touring MCC side bowling in tandem with Malcolm Francke. He played one more Shield game that summer, again with Francke, replacing David Ogilvie.

In 1975-76 Whyte took 3-53 for Queensland against the touring West Indian side but only played two other first class games.

Whyte appeared more regularly for Queensland in 1976–77. That summer he took 6–65 against WA. He also scored 93 in a game against South Australia. Whyte took 14 first class wickets overall at an average of 35.

During the season Whyte played several games for Queensland alongside Viv Richards who wrote in his memoirs that Whyte "was a real character... He would stand there and say, ‘Come on, Thommo [Jeff Thomson], rip the fucker up him.... Fucking give him plenty ... Hurt the fucker.’ But his batting was as limited as his vocabulary. When it was his turn and there was some pace about, the same guy who gave all that crap suddenly went deathly quiet... Out there he had all that chat, but when it came to it he displayed cowardice, and there are a lot like that in Shield cricket, good talkers when they are in the field but when they come in to bat it’s a different story."

After Australia's leading spinners Ray Bright and Kerry O'Keefe joined World Series Cricket in 1977, some observers such as Greg Chappell and Ray Robinson suggested Whyte may be selected for Australia. Robinson suggested Whyte's batting and fielding might seem him preferred to other spinners such as David Hourn and Jim Higgs.

Whyte had a very good season in 1977–78, taking 25 wickets at 32.48, and helping Queensland come second in the Sheffield Shield. His 4-62 against South Australia in the second innings helped bowl Queensland to victory. However the Australian selectors preferred spinners Tony Mann for the first four tests. In late December 1977 Ian Chappell wrote Tony Mann was "very fortunate" to be picked as Australia's spinner and "has very little competition as [Jim] Higgs and [David] Hourn are both only spin bowlers. Their batting and fielding talents are virtually non existent. The only real competition is Graham Whyte... who is a fine fieldsman, a more than useful batsman and a very promising off-spin bowler. However I venture to say that Whyte would find it harder to make runs in the Sheffield Shield competition than in a Test against India."

Mann was dropped after the fourth test but was replaced by Bruce Yardley, while Yardley and Jim Higgs were selected for the 1978 West Indies tour. Whyte's omission from the latter was publicly criticised by Queensland coach Ken Mackay, Queensland selector Tom Veivers and chairman of the QCA Norm McMahon.

In November 1978 Brian Mossop of the Sydney Morning Herald wrote that Whyte was still in "reckoning" for a test spot. However Whyte only took three first class wickets that summer and did not play first class cricket from March 1979 to October 1983.

Whyte was recalled to the Queensland team in October 1983, by which stage he was captain-coach of Queensland Colts. He replaced Craig McDermott. Whyte took 20 wickets at 40.80 that summer. He scored 51 against the touring Pakistan side and 58 in a game against Victoria. Whyte played in the 1983-84 Shield final and was Queensland's most successful bowler in the second innings, taking 3-28, but Queensland were unable to force a victory.

Whyte played two more first class games in 1984–85 as well as three one-day games against the touring West Indian and Sri Lankan teams. In 1986-87 Whyte was captain/coach of Surfers Paradise cricket club.

After he retired as a player, Whyte coached Gold Coast representative teams for several seasons. Former teammate Kev Maher said Whyte "was very well thought of" as a coach "and certainly exposed talented young players in the regions to the best coaching techniques that enabled them to flourish in their careers."

== Death ==
Whyte died after a long illness in January 2025.
