= Phillip Alleyne =

West Indian cricket umpire

Personal information
- Full name: Phillip Alleyne
- Died: January 2020; Roseau

Umpiring information
- ODIs umpired: 1 (1978)
- Source: Cricinfo, 16 May 2014

Phillip Alleyne was a West Indian cricket umpire and football manager. His only international game as an umpire was in 1978, when he officiated in a One Day International. He also managed the Dominica national football team. Alleyne died in January 2020.

== See also ==
- List of One Day International cricket umpires
- Australian cricket team in West Indies in 1977–78
