= Ian Callen =

Australian cricketer

Personal information
- Full name: Ian Wayne Callen
- Born: 2 May 1955 (age 71); Alexandra, Victoria, Australia
- Height: 187 cm (6 ft 2 in)
- Batting: Left-handed
- Bowling: Right-arm fast-medium

International information
- National side: Australia
- Only Test (cap 291): 28 January 1978 v India
- ODI debut (cap 39): 22 February 1978 v West Indies
- Last ODI: 22 October 1982 v Pakistan

Domestic team information
- Years: Team
- 1976/77–1984/85: Victoria
- 1977: Northumberland
- 1985/86: Boland

Career statistics
Competition	Test	ODI	FC	LA
Matches	1	5	53	20
Runs scored	26	6	578	69
Batting average	–	6.00	12.29	11.50
100s/50s	0/0	0/0	0/0	0/0
Top score	22*	3*	34	15
Balls bowled	440	180	10,727	1,056
Wickets	6	5	197	31
Bowling average	31.83	29.60	27.47	22.87
5 wickets in innings	0	0	7	0
10 wickets in match	0	0	1	0
Best bowling	3/83	3/24	8/42	4/47
Catches/stumpings	1/–	2/–	19/–	6/–
- Source: Cricinfo, 12 December 2005

Ian Wayne Callen (born 2 May 1955) is a former Australian cricketer who played in one Test match and five One Day Internationals between 1978 and 1982. He later ran a business making cricket bats from English willow he grew in Victoria and was the cricket writer for Sportshounds.

== Cricket career ==
Callen made his first-class debut for Victoria in 1976–77. In his fourth Sheffield Shield match he took 4 for 55 and 5 for 15 in an innings victory for Victoria over South Australia, and in the next match he took 1 for 82 and 8 for 42 in a 10-wicket victory over Queensland.

His only Test came against India in Adelaide in 1978. Despite being badly affected by the injections he had received just before the match in preparation for the tour to the West Indies that was to follow, he took three wickets in each innings, helping bowl Australia to a series-winning victory. On the night before the last day's play, he collapsed in the team hotel and was placed on an intravenous drip, but recovered to take an important part in Australia's victory on the last day.

On the tour of the West Indies, he played in the first ODI, taking 1-42, and the second, taking 3-24. During the tour he fractured a vertebra in his lower back. In 1982 he returned to international cricket in Pakistan with the Australian team. He played in three ODIs, taking 1-32, 0-50 and not bowling in the third. He never fully recovered from the lower back injury.

== Later career ==
Callen established Ian Callen Sports in 1981. He sold it in 1985 to concentrate on making a range of three bats, the MX, the K-IX and the Aussie Boomah. His company in the Yarra Valley, Callen Cricket, has re-established the growing of cricket-bat willow from stock sent to Australia by English Test captain A. C. MacLaren in 1902. He harvests and processes the timber from his plantations at Healesville and Sale. The timber is used for the manufacture of cricket bats and picture frame mouldings.

He conducts courses teaching the craft of making cricket bats by hand. At first he used willow imported from England, but now he uses his own.
