= Wesley Malcolm =

West Indian cricket umpire

Umpiring information
- Tests umpired: 2 (1978–1983)
- ODIs umpired: 1 (1978)
- WTests umpired: 1 (1976)
- Source: Cricinfo, 11 July 2013

Wesley Malcolm is a West Indian former cricket umpire. He stood in one ODI game in 1978 and two Test matches, in 1978 and 1983. He umpired 18 first-class matches, all of them in Jamaica, between 1970 and 1983.

== See also ==
- List of Test cricket umpires
- List of One Day International cricket umpires
