= Rick Darling =

Australian cricketer

Personal information
- Full name: Warrick Maxwell Darling
- Born: 1 May 1957 (age 69); Waikerie, South Australia
- Batting: Right-handed
- Role: Batsman
- Relatives: Joe Darling (great-uncle)

International information
- National side: Australia
- Test debut (cap 292): 28 January 1978 v India
- Last Test: 3 November 1979 v India
- ODI debut (cap 41): 22 February 1978 v West Indies
- Last ODI: 23 January 1982 v West Indies

Domestic team information
- Years: Team
- 1975/76–1985/86: South Australia

Career statistics
Competition	Test	ODI	FC	LA
Matches	14	18	98	31
Runs scored	697	363	5554	758
Batting average	26.80	21.35	35.83	27.07
100s/50s	0/6	0/1	9/32	1/3
Top score	91	74	134	101*
Balls bowled	–	–	32	–
Wickets	–	–	0	–
Bowling average	–	–	–	–
5 wickets in innings	–	–	–	–
10 wickets in match	–	–	–	–
Best bowling	–	–	–	–
Catches/stumpings	5/–	6/–	31/–	8/–
- Source: CricketArchive, 15 April 2010

Warrick Maxwell Darling (born 1 May 1957), known as Rick Darling, is a former Australian Test cricketer.

His tendency to play the cut and hook shots provided much entertainment, but also meant that he was inconsistent and error-prone. It has been said that the introduction of the batting helmet saved Darling's life several times, but also gave him extra confidence to play his favoured shots. Darling's early Test career was also characterised by his opening partnerships with Graeme Wood, the pair christened the "Kamikaze Kids" due to their often disastrous running between the wickets, which saw one of the pair dismissed run out in one innings of each of their four Tests together.

== Early life ==
Darling is the great-nephew of Joe Darling, and learnt to play cricket at his family's home at Ramco on the Murray River. He started playing for the Salisbury Cricket Club in the Adelaide district competition in 1970–71.

He was picked for South Australia Colts in 1974–75, scoring 67 against Western Australia, 105 against Victoria, 48 against the West Indies and 45 against WA.

=== 1975–76: First Class Debut ===
Darling started his first-class career in 1975–76 with South Australia. He made his debut against Queensland, batting at number 6, being run out for 5. (Darling would later become notorious for being involved in run outs throughout his career.) He then made 26 and 48 against Victoria, helping South Australia win the game. He scored 2 against the touring West Indians. A second innings of 29 helped guide South Australia to victory against Western Australia. He also made 2 and 32 against WA, 1 and 41 against Victoria and 12 against NSW. South Australia won the Sheffield Shield that year. Ian Chappell praised the fielding of Darling and David Hookes as a contributing factor to South Australia's triumph ("have added to our mobility").

=== 1976–77 ===
Darling's Sheffield Shield scores for the 1976–77 season were 2 and 14, 0 and 25, 3 and 64. He made his initial first class century with 107 against Victoria. Then made 1 and 39, 22 and 4 and 7.

Darling made his one-day debut in the Gillette Cup quarter finals but only scored one.

== Test player ==
Darling was given his chance in the Australian Test team through the defection of several players to World Series Cricket in 1977. In October 1977 Ray Robinson listed Darling as a test possibility, saying Darling and Dav Whatmore "both look test material for the future". However at the beginning of the season he was 12th man for South Australia against the Indian team. Darling eventually got back into the first eleven and scored runs, playing particularly well against Western Australia, making 45 and 100. He made 101 against Tasmania in a one-day game, which won him the Man of the Match Award nd saw him come into discussions about possibly opening for Australia, especially as the test team had been unable to find a consistent opening combination throughout the summer. Darling's other scores were 0 and 43 against Victoria and 39 and 15 against WA.

Darling was selected for the Australian team for the fifth test against India and subsequent tour of the West Indies (both were announced on the same day). He later recalled, "I was at the local water ski beach having a ski and first thing I knew was dad came down in the ute in a cloud of dust and was yelling out from the other side of the river 'come over here, get to Adelaide and play in the fifth Test'". Also selected to make his test debut was Graeme Wood of Western Australia; it was thought Wood and Darling two could make an ideal opening combination, although Wood was only 21 and Darling just 20. Darling was the youngest member of the tour team. Ian Chappell wrote, "I applaud the selection" of Darling, saying "he is as good a hooker as you will find in Shield cricket and uses his feet well to spin bowlers." Chapell added "I am not convinced about him opening in test matches yet, but if he is brought along gradually on tour he may be the answer to a long-standing Australian problem."

Australia's gamble on Wood and Darling made dividends with the two of them putting on 89 for the first wicket, Australia's best opening partnership of the series. Darling made 65. Bill O'Reilly said he "functioned with extraordinary confidence" and called it "a magnificent debut which will give Australian cricket a lift." Darling followed his up with 56 in the second innings, helping Australia win the game.

=== West Indies tour ===
Darling began the West Indies tour well, scoring 26 and 35 in a tour game against Leeward Islands and 8 in the first ODI. John Benaud wrote "the form of Rick Darling on this West Indian tour has been so disappointing the Australian selectors minds must be churning at the thought of yet another opening experiment." Darling then made 105 and 43 against Trinidad and Tobago. However he missed the first test due to a virus infection (being replaced by Craig Serjeant.

Darling recovered and made 62 against Barbados. He scored 21 in the second ODI.

Darling was picked for the second test but failed twice, making 4 and 8. A score of 123 in a tour game against Guyana restored his confidence but Darling failed twice again in the third test (which Australia won), making 15 and 0.

Darling made 12 and 36 against the Windward Islands (doubling as wicketkeeper) and failed again in the fourth test, making 10 and 6. According to one report "Darling has developed an unfortunate habit of committing himself to the front foot, always looking to work the ball on the leg side. Yesterday he was bowled when he moved too far inside the line to glance and left his leg stump exposed."

Darling had made 43 runs in six test innings. He was dropped from the Australia team for the fifth test, being replaced by David Ogilvie. Bob Simpson said he would have preferred a specialist opener "but we couldn't really persevere with Rick." Australia came close to winning the game before the crowd rioted and the match ended in a draw. Darling did finish the tour with 75 against Bermuda Counties. However it had been a disappointing tour for Darling, who now found his position in the Australian team in doubt.

=== 1978–79 Ashes ===
Darling began the 1978–79 season poorly failing twice for South Australia against the touring English team, making 17 and 1. Peter McFarline of The Age felt Darling "hooked himself out of the first test side" with this match.

Darling then made 39 against Tasmania. He was omitted for the first test team with Australia using Wood and Gary Cosier as openers. However they failed to put on a strong opening stand and when Darling scored 85 and 82 against NSW he was recalled for the second test, with Cosier dropped down the order. "I will hook as long as I live," said Darling. "I am not going to quit the shot. Why should I when it gets me so many of my runs?" "I'm happy that we now have two experienced opening batsmen in Wood and Rick Darling, and I am confident that they will be able to give us a sound start," said captain Graham Yallop. This did not turn out to be the case with Darling only scoring 25 (run out) and 5. (Although he was incorrectly ruled run out in the first innings.)

Darling then made 19 and 41 for South Australia against England. Darling and Wood put on two 50-plus opening stands in the third test, helping Australia to a rare victory. Darling made 33 (run out) in the first innings and 21 in the second. The number of times either Darling or Wood were run out saw them given the nickname "the kamikaze kids". According to Darling, "It was not the way we ran between wickets it was the speed we ran between wickets. For example, if we were running a three, I or him would be coming back for the third when the other person was only finishing the second. It wasn't the calling, it wasn't the misjudgement of a run — well I suppose it was — but it all goes back to the speed of us at the time."

Darling's finest Test innings was 91 against England at Sydney in the 4th Test. Bill O'Reilly called the batsman's performance "top class. A few weeks ago this young man was performing like an undisiplined yet talented apprentice who had not mastered the basic lessons on self control... Since then, he has matured incredibly." Darling helped Australia to a first innings lead but they collapsed in the second innings (Darling made 13; it was Wood's turn to be run out) and lost badly, meaning England retained the Ashes. O'Reilly bemoaned Darling's second innings dismissal calling it "a depressing loss of concentration."

Darling was injured in a fielding mishap playing for South Australia against an invitational eleven. "I just could not hold a bat", he said. "Frankly I don't think I'll be able to play again for at least a week". This saw him omitted for a one-day match against England (he was replaced by Andrew Hilditch). However he kept his place for the fifth test. It was this match for which Darling is perhaps most famous, as he was struck on the chest by a delivery that lifted viciously from fast bowler Bob Willis. The blow caused Darling's chewing gum to become lodged in his throat, and he collapsed on the pitch, not breathing. Umpire Max O'Connell and SACA physiotherapist Michael Mason moved Darling's tongue forward and removed gum. "He was in agony, grasping for breath and almost unconscious when I got to him," said Mason. Darling was taken off the field to send to hospital:

"All I can remember is, Bob Willis had this big inswinging, in-dipping action", Darling says. "The ball was pitched well outside off stump was the last thing I remember. Once it swung in, it also cut in further. I was caught in no man's land. I was sort of caught out of position, and hit in the chest. Unfortunately, at the time, I was chewing a chewy, and I swallowed my tongue and chewy as well. That caused me to black out."

Darling returned to the crease the following day, but could only make 15 runs. Darling:

I knew the Englishmen would test me out as soon as I walked out. Ian Botham. Bob Willis. I remember facing Ian Botham when I went out there, and he did test me out. Fortunately enough I did hook him for a six, but I must admit it was more of a top edge. Adelaide Oval had quite short square boundaries, and it managed to clear them for a six. Of course he tested me out a few more times.

Darling made 9 in the second innings and Australia fell to a crushing 205-run loss, which allowed England to retain The Ashes.

English captain Mike Brearley attributed his team's success to its ability to get through the Australian batting order. "The biggest problem is to break the opening pair, Rick Darling and Graeme Wood", he said. "At times they have played very well, but we have found that once we can get one of them cheaply we have been able to dismiss numbers three, four and five with the new ball."

Darling was dropped from the Australian test team for the sixth test in favour of Andrew Hilditch. He kept his place in the one day team but performed poorly. Darling made 36 against NSW, 17 and 22 against Queensland, and 1 and 34 against WA.

Australia lost the first test against Pakistan and Darling was recalled for the second test, replacing Graeme Wood. "Darling has been unlucky throughout the series", said Yallop. Darling made 79 for South Australia against Pakistan. He carried this form into the test match, fielding brilliantly and scoring 75 in the first innings, putting on 96 with Hilditch. A similar knock of 79 in the second innings helped Australia win and Darling won the man of the match award.

It was reported that World Series Cricket officials had offered Darling a contract for the upcoming 1979/80 WSC season (which did not eventuate). Darling had been unemployed for six months but went to work for Hindmarsh Building Society, sponsors of the South Australian team.

Career batting graph for Rick Darling

Darling was described as one of the most nervous first-class cricketers, often biting his fingernails before he went out to bat.

=== 1979 World Cup ===
Darling was selected to play for Australia in the 1979 World Cup. He made 60 in a warm up game against New Zealand but failed to impress in the official games, with scores of 25 (against England), 13 (against Pakistan) and 13 (against Canada).

=== 1979 India tour ===
Darling was selected for Australia's tour of India in 1979. He fell ill with a stomach ailment early in the tour. Then later he was hit in the face while fielding, meaning he only batted once in the lead up games, making 34 against North Zone. Eventually Darling was ruled unfit and Wood took his place.

Darling returned to the team for the second test, replacing Dav Whatmore but was dismissed cheaply for 7 in the first innings, and did not bat in the second innings due to illness.

82 in a tour game against Central Zone restored his confidence. In the third test he was injured again while fielding. Darling batted down the order and scored a fighting 59. He opened in the second innings and scored only 4.

According to a contemporary report, "In a team of complex characters, Darling is perhaps the most complex. He is a tremendously talented batsman dragged back by acute nervousness. Sometimes he gets so worked up thinking about batting that he has to run off the field and be physically ill in the dressing room. Darling's problem has always been with him. It is the main reason why he has been made into an opener, when his technique and attacking flair make him more suited to a position down the order."

Darling made 27 and 3 against West Zone and was dismissed cheaply twice in the fourth test, 19 and 7. He was dropped down the order for the fifth and sixth tests. In the fifth he made 39 and 7; in the 6th it was 16 and 0.

In the final Test, Darling was hit on the head attempting a hook shot from a Kapil Dev bouncer, and was carried off the field and forced to retire hurt with no score to his name. His head split open, Darling was taken to hospital, where, according to Bob Merriman, the doctors refused to stitch him up until he signed an autograph for them. (Darling later said this was untrue.)

== Post-WSC career ==
=== 1979–80 ===
In late 1979 Ian Chappell wrote that Darling was a front runner to partner with Bruce Laird for Australia although "my personal feeling is that he [Darling] is better down the list." Indeed, Darling asked if he could bat down the order for South Australia although "I accept I would have a better chance" of playing for Australia "if I was opening. But I enjoy it better down the order. I feel more relaxed." He was originally named at number four for South Australia against the West Indies then was promoted to three. He made 88, which saw him discussed as a possible selection for the first test. However Darling was overlooked in favour of Rick McCosker.

A month later Darling said "I can see that if I want to get back in the Test side I will have to concentrate on opening because there seems to be plenty of middle-order batsmen". However, when picked to play against the West Indies for a Tasmanian Invitational XI he made 1. He asked to bat down the order he was dismissed for 15. Darling returned to opening. Against NSW he made 42 and 10 then impressed against England with 45 and 75 not out and 50 against WA.

Darling was selected to play for Australia in the one day team in December 1979, replacing Bruce Laird. He made 20.

He followed this with 134 against Queensland in a Sheffield Shield game, his fifth first class century. He was injured while fielding later in the season.

=== 1980–81 ===
Darling began the next summer well with 81 against Tasmania. He suffered more injury problems hurting his thigh in a game against Western Australia. Highlights of the summer included 61 against India, 65 against Victoria and 50, plus 51 in a McDonald's Cup semi final. In January 1980 Darling was hit on the temple from a Jeff Thomson delivery in a Shield game against Queensland and had to be taken to hospital.

=== 1981–82: Return to the national team ===
Darling had an excellent season in 1981–82. He made 72 against NSW and 88 against the West Indies (a game in which he ran out Gordon Greenidge). When Graham Yallop fell injured, Darling was recalled to the Australian one day team; he was felt to be suited to one day cricket due to his fast scoring and excellent fielding. (However Dirk Wellham, not Darling, replaced Yallop in the test team.)

Darling made 41 in an ODI against Pakistan, featuring in another run out with Graeme Wood, but being Australia's second top scorer. Later innings included 5 against the West Indies, 35 against Pakistan (where Darling was run out again) and 74 against Pakistan (Australia's top score, Darling run out again, Pakistan won).

Darling followed this 132 and 58 not out for South Australia against Pakistan. However he had a run of low scores in the ODIs – 7 against the West Indies, 5 (run out) against Pakistan and 20 against the West Indies. Darling was dropped from the one day team with the return of Kim Hughes to the squad and the recall of Rick McCosker.

Darling made 134 against Victoria which saw him back in the one day team, replacing an injured Rick McCosker. "Darling is chancy with the bat but the selectors are banking on his coming good in their moment of need", wrote the Canberra Times. "He now has 659 runs in first-class cricket this season and brings the bonus of brilliant cover fielding."

Darling made a useful 34 against the West Indies, helping Australia to a victory. He made 14 in the next game (in which Wood was run out) then was dropped again from the squad in favour of David Hookes. He and Hookes were placed on standby for the Australian team for the Test in Adelaide against West Indies in case Greg Chappell and Kim Hughes were unable to field.

Other notable innings that year for Darling included 88 and 52 against Tasmania, and 121 against West Australia. He also made a half century in the McDonald's Cup semi final. South Australia won the Sheffield Shield at the end of the season. Darling's batting was a crucial part of the state's success. His omission from the 1982 tour of Pakistan surprised several observers.

=== 1982–83: Serious injury ===
Darling took some time to get going form-wise at the start of the 1982–83 season. He was beginning to find form with 98 against NSW. His next match was against Queensland; Darling was 17 when he was hit on the face by a delivery from John Maguire. He suffered bleeding in the eye and lacerations and had to spend several days in hospital. He returned to the team two months later. He played one game, making 15 and 4, then declared himself unavailable due to personal commitments. Darling later recalled:

The one that finished my career was when I got hit in my eye by John Maguire from Queensland...He got one to really rear up, and I got back to hook and it went between the visor and the top part of the helmet and smashed in my eye. That finished me. After that, I didn't want to be there. I thought of other things I wanted to do in life. Even though I continued playing on in Shield for two or three years, I just didn't want to be there.

=== 1983–84 and later seasons ===
During the 1983–84 summer he returned to the South Australian team, batting down the order. He scored 58 against Pakistan but in his next game he clashed with South Australian captain David Hookes who wanted Darling to open in the absence of Wayne Phillips, but Darling wanted to bat down the order. Hookes responded by making Darling come in at number eight. Darling was then told he would have to open in the next game. He withdrew for the rest of the season as a result.

Darling returned for the 1984/85 season, claiming the dispute had been settled. He scored 100 in a state trial game but was omitted from the initial state squad. He managed to force his way back into the team for several games that summer, making 113 runs at 37 with a highest score of 58.

In 1985–86 Darling scored a century against the touring Indians. It was his best innings of the season, in which Darling made 350 runs at an average of 31. Another highlight was 97 against NSW and 60 against NSW.

In 1986 Darling played Lancashire League cricket for Whalley. He scored eight consecutive centuries for them.

=== Summary ===
Overall, he played 98 first-class games, finishing with a batting average of 35.83. Darling was renowned for being one of the country's best cover fieldsmen of his time.

In 2014 he recalled that he was injured several times:

Probably the ones that hit me in the head later on in my career were a lot more detrimental than the one that hit me in the chest. The fact that it has caused long-term effects – I was probably hit badly in the head three or four times in my career. To the point where it has now caused what they call post-traumatic epilepsy. It's not a full-blown epilepsy attack, but more of a dizzy spell, sort of a blackout type. Only in the last 12 months has this been identified. Medication has fixed it up.

== Retirement ==
In 2014 Darling was working as a gardener at a retirement home.

== Trivia ==
- Darling holds the record of eight consecutive scores over 50 in the Ribblesdale League, obtained whilst playing for Whalley Cricket Club.

== Footnotes ==
1. – Alan McGilvray (1978). "Alan McGilvray's Australian Selection". ABC Cricket Book - England Tour of Australia 1978–79. Sydney, Australia: Australian Broadcasting Commission. p. 21. ISBN 0-642-97244-3.
2. – "The Ashes, 1978–79, 5th Test scorecard". Cricinfo.
3. – Partab Ramchand (26 February 2001). "India one up at the Wankhede stadium". Cricinfo.
4. – "Shake those Pompoms!". The Sports Factor. ABC Radio National. 8 October 2004.
5. – "Whalley Cricket Club". Archived from the original on 12 January 2006.
