= Trevor Laughlin =

Australian cricketer (born 1951)

Personal information
- Full name: Trevor John Laughlin
- Born: 30 January 1951 (age 75); Nyah West, Victoria, Australia
- Batting: Left-handed
- Bowling: Right-arm medium
- Role: All-rounder
- Relatives: Ben Laughlin (son)

International information
- National side: Australia
- Test debut (cap 296): 31 March 1978 v West Indies
- Last Test: 1 December 1978 v England
- ODI debut (cap 42): 22 February 1978 v West Indies
- Last ODI: 11 December 1979 v England

Domestic team information
- Years: Team
- 1974/75–1980/81: Victoria

Career statistics
Competition	Test	ODI	FC	LA
Matches	3	6	58	19
Runs scored	87	105	2,770	345
Batting average	17.40	26.25	32.58	23.00
100s/50s	0/0	0/1	1/19	0/1
Top score	35	74	113	74
Balls bowled	516	308	6,811	799
Wickets	6	8	99	14
Bowling average	43.66	28.00	31.92	39.07
5 wickets in innings	1	0	3	0
10 wickets in match	0	0	0	0
Best bowling	5/101	3/54	5/38	3/54
Catches/stumpings	3/–	0/–	40/–	7/–
- Source: CricketArchive, 15 April 2009

Trevor John Laughlin (born 30 January 1951) is a former Australian cricketer who played in three Test matches and six One Day Internationals from 1978 to 1979.

In addition, Laughlin was also an Australian rules footballer who played for Mordialloc Football Club in the Victorian Football Association (VFA).

Laughlin's son Ben has also played international cricket for Australia.

== Career ==
Laughlin made his first class debut in 1974–75 against South Australia. He scored a 50 and took five wickets. He made 71 in his next game against Western Australia and 52 against Queensland.

Laughlin was a regular for Victoria for the 1975–76 season. He made 482 runs at 30 including his debut first class century, 113, and took 9 wickets at 56.

For the 1976-77 summer, Laughlin made 296 runs at 25 and took 11 wickets at 37.

In 1977-78 a number of key Australian players signed up for World Series Cricket. Laughlin had a very strong domestic season, with 497 runs at an average of 49.7 and 20 wickets at 29. These efforts saw him picked to tour the West Indies with the Australian team.

"It's fantastic news and I'm very happy," said Laughlin.

=== International cricketer ===
Laughlin scored 60 for Australia against Leeward Islands then took five wickets against Barbados. He then took 5–137 against Guyana. Laughlin was picked in the third test replacing Jim Higgs.

Laughlin had a good debut. He took 1–34 in the first innings, and made 21 in Australia's first innings, helping the team recover from a week position. Laughin went wicketless in Australia's second innings but contributed with the bat, taking Australia from 6–290 to 7-338 (Australia needed 362 to win).

Injuries to Wayne Clark and Ian Callen saw Laughlin selected again in the fifth test. He scored 35 and took 5–101.

Laughlin had reasonable form in 1978–79, including 73 against Western Australia. He was picked in the first test against England but did not have a strong game, taking no wickets and being dismissed twice cheaply.

Laughlin was part of the Victorian team that won the Sheffield Shield that summer. He was recalled for the first test against Pakistan. "What recent performance of his clinched his resurrection," wrote Bill O'Reilly. "I would like to know?" He fell injured prior to the game and was replaced by Wayne Clark. Laughlin was picked in the second test but was made 12th man.

Laughlin did play several ODIs that summer. His innings of 15 off 11 balls helped Australia to a rare victory over England in the 4th ODI and he took 2 wickets in the 5th ODI.

Laughlin was selected in the Australian squad for the 1979 World Cup. He only played one game, taking 2–38 against England.

Laughlin played one ODI over the 1979-80 summer and scored 74. He was not picked for any other international games although he did win another Sheffield Shield with Victoria in 1979–80.

=== Later career ===
Laughlin played one more season of first class cricket, in 1980–81.

In March 1984 he won the Jack Ryder Medal

== Sources ==
- Atkinson, G. (1982) Everything you ever wanted to know about Australian rules football but couldn't be bothered asking, The Five Mile Press: Melbourne. ISBN 0 86788 009 0.
