= Tony Mann (cricketer) =

Australian cricketer (1945–2019)

Personal information
- Full name: Anthony Longford Mann
- Born: 8 November 1945
- Died: 15 November 2019 (aged 74)
- Batting: Left-handed
- Bowling: Legbreak googly

International information
- National side: Australia
- Test debut (cap 285): 2 December 1977 v India
- Last Test: 7 January 1978 v India

Career statistics
| Competition | Test | First-class |
|---|---|---|
| Matches | 4 | 80 |
| Runs scored | 189 | 2,544 |
| Batting average | 23.62 | 24.22 |
| 100s/50s | 1/0 | 2/11 |
| Top score | 105 | 110 |
| Balls bowled | 552 | 14,802 |
| Wickets | 4 | 200 |
| Bowling average | 79.00 | 34.54 |
| 5 wickets in innings | 0 | 5 |
| 10 wickets in match | 0 | 0 |
| Best bowling | 3/12 | 6/94 |
| Catches/stumpings | 2/– | 47/– |
- Source: ESPNCricInfo, 25 May 2020

Anthony Longford Mann (8 November 1945 – 15 November 2019) was an Australian cricketer who played in four Test matches during the 1977/78 season (from early December 1977 to mid-January 1978).

He was only the second man in history to score a century in a Test match after being sent in as nightwatchman.

== Career ==
Born in Middle Swan, Western Australia, Mann was a leg break bowler with a sharp googly. He was almost selected for 1969–70 Australian Second XI Tour of New Zealand when the Test players were in India and South Africa. A useful batsman, he made the Test side during the first season of the Packer schism.

He was in England during 1971-72 when, while playing at club level for Lancashire's Bacup Cricket Club, he also appeared at county level for Shropshire.

He was selected to play against the touring Indian side, being picked over Jim Higgs due in part because of his better batting. Mann took 3–12 in the first innings of the First Test and also made useful scores of 19 and 26 in a closely fought match. He was less successful in the second innings as a bowler, taking 0–52.

In the Second Test he found the going harder against the Indian batsmen, taking 0–63 and 0–49. However, in the second innings, when Australia was chasing 339 to win the game, Mann came to the wicket as nightwatchman when Australia was 1–13 and did not leave until they were 2–172 by which time he had scored 105 runs, helping lay the platform for an Australian victory.

He was used sparingly as a bowler in the Third Test and in the Fourth Test he was dismissed for a pair and took 0–101. He was dropped in favour of fellow West Australian Bruce Yardley for the Fifth Test and never played for Australia again.

== Family and personal life ==
His father was Jack Mann, a pioneer of the wine industry in Western Australia.

Mann was a schoolteacher for 30 years before becoming manager for the WACA, Adam Gilchrist being among his notable recruits to the Western Australia cricket team. He died of pancreatic cancer at St John of God Murdoch Hospital in November 2019, aged 74.
