= Peter Toohey =

Australian cricketer

Personal information
- Full name: Peter Michael Toohey
- Born: 20 April 1954; Blayney, New South Wales
- Nickname: Rats
- Batting: Right-handed
- Bowling: Right-arm medium
- Role: Batsman

International information
- National side: Australia (1977–1979)
- Test debut (cap 288): 2 December 1977 v India
- Last Test: 29 December 1979 v West Indies
- ODI debut (cap 45): 22 February 1978 v West Indies
- Last ODI: 7 February 1979 v England

Domestic team information
- Years: Team
- 1974/75–1983/84: New South Wales

Career statistics
Competition	Test	ODI	FC	LA
Matches	15	5	94	30
Runs scored	893	105	5735	713
Batting average	31.89	52.50	37.98	33.95
100s/50s	1/7	0/1	12/31	0/6
Top score	122	54*	158	82
Balls bowled	–	–	27	24
Wickets	–	–	0	1
Bowling average	–	–	–	14.00
5 wickets in innings	–	–	–	0
10 wickets in match	–	–	–	0
Best bowling	–	–	–	1/14
Catches/stumpings	9/–	0/–	67/–	9/–
- Source: CricInfo, 12 December 2018

Peter Toohey (born 20 April 1954) is a former Australian cricketer who played in 15 Test matches and five One Day Internationals between 1977 and 1979. Toohey was one of the cricketers who came to the fore when the bulk of Australia's top cricketers defected to Kerry Packer's World Series Cricket. During his prime playing years in the Australian Test team, some media commentators referred to Toohey as "Australia's master batsman", such was Toohey's pivotal role in the Australian team during the absence of the World Series players.

When the World Series Cricket players returned to mainstream Test cricket in 1979–80, Toohey only played two more Tests, both in the summer of 1979–80. He retired from cricket and now works in the financial sector in Brisbane.

== Career ==
Toohey was born in Blayney, New South Wales, and played cricket for St Stanislaus' College in Bathurst, New South Wales.

He toured New Zealand with Western Districts Colts and played for New South Wales Schoolboys. Toohey started playing club cricket for Wests.

=== First Class Debut ===
Toohey made his first-class debut for New South Wales against Queensland in 1974–75, replacing Ron Crippin. He scored 0 and 12. He played two more first class games that summer making only 45 runs in all.

Toohey played better over the 1975-76 season, making 601 first class runs at an average of 40. The next summer he scored 515 runs at 37, a highlight being 116 against Queensland.

=== Test Player ===
During the 1977–78 season, defections to World Series Cricket saw opportunities open up for Australian cricketers. At the beginning of the summer, New South Wales captain Bob Simpson, who had come out of retirement to help establishment cricket, said ""I feel Toohey is on the verge of Test selection. He has already made runs in last year's firstclass cricket and has been playing well- this season".

Toohey was selected for the first Test against India, one of six debutants. Toohey was expected to be 12th man but he made the final eleven while Kim Hughes, who had already played test cricket, was relegated to 12th man.

Toohey had an excellent first test. When he came to the wicket Australia were 4-43; Toohey helped stop a collapse and by the time he was dismissed for 82 runs, Australia had made 166. In the second innings he put on a crucial partnership of 84 with Bob Simpson, scoring 57 runs. Australia won the game by 16 runs and Toohey was awarded Man of the Match.

In the second test, Toohey made a duck in the first innings but his second innings of 83 was crucial in Australia chasing down a total of 342 to win the game.

Toohey failed in the third test (14 and 14), and made 4 and 85 in the fourth test. His fighting innings of 85, played with an injured ankle, inspired Simpson to call him "a great player". Australia lost both these matches.

In the fifth test Toohey made 60 in the first innings and 10 in the second, helping Australia win. His series tally of 409 runs at 41 was second only to Bob Simpson, and far superior to the next best batter (Gary Cosier with 240 runs). Toohey was voted NSW Cricketer of the Year.

Toohey was selected on the 1978 tour of the West Indies.

In the first test he was knocked out, returned to the field, was dismissed for 20 and did not bat in the second innings. He missed the second and third tests but was back for the fourth in which Toohey made 40 and 17.

In the fifth test Toohey's double of 122 and 97 put Australia in a strong position to win before the game was prematurely ended due to a riot. He scored 566 first class runs on tour at 51.

As one of Australia's best batters, Toohey's name was floated as a possibility for the Australian captaincy after Bob Simpson retired but the job went to Graham Yallop. Toohey was also approached to play for Queensland but elected to stay in New South Wales.

=== 1978-79 vs England ===
Toohey had a poor series in 1978-79 against England. He made 1 and 1 in the first test. After 81 in the first innings of the second test, his scores were then 0, 32, 20. 1 and 5.

Toohey was made 12th man for the 5th test, then scored 54 in an ODI which helped Australia win the game. He followed this with a useful 16 in a low scoring ODI which Australia also won. Toohey was recalled to the test side for the 6th test against England, and made 8 and 0.

He was dropped for the first test against Pakistan, and overlooked for the 1979 World Cup squad and team to tour India. He made 633 first class runs that summer at 33.

=== 1979-80 Recall to Test Side ===
Toohey was recalled to the Australian side over the 1979-80 summer after an injury to David Hookes, and scoring 111 against WA. He played two tests, making 19 and 3 against England and 10 and 7 against the West Indies, before being dropped again. He made 697 runs that summer at 43.56.

== Later career ==
Toohey scored 357 runs in 1980-81 at 32.45. He was Man of the Match in a McDonald's Cup game, scoring 55.

In 1981-82 he made 511 runs at 46.45.

He was suspended in 1982-83 after an altercation with an umpire in a game of grade cricket.

Toohey's form declined during the 1983–84 season (258 runs at 29) and he was dropped from the NSW side. He did score 82 in a McDonald's Cup game, earning Man of the Match.

Toohey eventually retired from first class cricket in May 1984.
