= Graeme Wood (cricketer) =

Australian cricketer

Personal information
- Full name: Graeme Malcolm Wood
- Born: 6 November 1956 (age 70); East Fremantle, Western Australia
- Batting: Left-handed
- Bowling: Right arm medium
- Role: Opening batsman
- Relatives: Mike Veletta (brother-in-law)

International information
- National side: Australia
- Test debut (cap 293): 28 January 1978 v India
- Last Test: 29 December 1988 v West Indies
- ODI debut (cap 46): 22 February 1978 v West Indies
- Last ODI: 14 January 1989 v West Indies

Domestic team information
- Years: Team
- 1976/77–1991/92: Western Australia

Career statistics
Competition	Test	ODI	FC	LA
Matches	59	83	227	142
Runs scored	3,374	2,219	13,353	3,641
Batting average	31.83	33.62	39.97	31.38
100s/50s	9/13	3/11	35/61	4/18
Top score	172	114*	186*	114*
Balls bowled	0	0	271	30
Wickets	–	–	6	0
Bowling average	–	–	26.00	–
5 wickets in innings	–	–	0	–
10 wickets in match	–	–	0	–
Best bowling	–	–	3/18	–
Catches/stumpings	41/–	17/–	155/–	32/–
- Source: Cricinfo, 18 November 2008

Graeme Malcolm Wood (born 6 November 1956) is a former Australian cricketer who played in 59 Test matches and 83 One Day Internationals from 1978 to 1989. He scored nine Test centuries in his career, which was a record for a Western Australian until it was surpassed by Justin Langer.

== Domestic career ==
In first-class cricket, Wood scored 13,353 runs, making 35 centuries and 61 half centuries. As the captain of Western Australia he led the team to victory in three Sheffield Shield finals and another in the limited overs competition.

In February 1978 Wood won Man of the Match in the Final of the Gilette Cup competition, his innings of 108 helping WA beat Tasmania.

He was dropped from the WA side at the beginning of the 1979–80 season. After three games he was recalled, making 350 runs at 43.75. Then he broke his hand and missed some more games. However he recovered to make 214 for Melville in the club semi finals and 112 in the grand final.

== International career ==
=== World Series Cricket ===
His Test debut came against India as a 21-year-old in 1978. He got his place in the side due to several of Australia's best players defecting to World Series Cricket. Wood was selected for the fifth test against India and on the touring squad for the West Indies.

Wood kept his place in the Australian side for the 1978–79 Ashes.

In the second test, Wood scored 64 in the second innings. He was controversially given out by umpire Tom Brooks, who resigned from international cricket after the game.

In the third test, his first innings of 100 set up Australia's sole victory.

Wood was picked on the 1979 tour to India. He was dropped after the second test.

=== Post World Series Cricket ===
Wood lost his spot in the Western Australia team at the start of the 1979–80 season.

Wood was selected in the Australian side to tour England in August 1980. He was picked over Julian Wiener and Rick McCosker who had gone to Pakistan. Wood scored a century in the Centenary Test.

In 1980–81 Wood scored 98 not out in an ODI against India.

He maintained his place in the Australian cricket team for the majority of the early to mid-1980s. He was dropped after the disastrous Ashes tour of England in 1985.

After excellent domestic form Wood was recalled in 1988/89 for the Test series against the West Indies. Wood scored 111 and 42 in the second Test, but was dropped after the third Test. Overall his best innings seemed to be against the West Indies, and the Australian selectors always seemed to recall him when a series against them was close. But after 1988 he never appeared in the Test side again.

== Other sports ==
Prior to making his Test debut in 1978, Wood played Australian rules football for the East Fremantle Football Club in the West Australian National Football League, playing 14 games between 1975 and 1977.

== Administration ==
Wood held various management positions in Carlton & United Breweries and Treasury Wine Estates after his international career in cricket.
