= Ray Bright =

Australian cricketer (born 1954)

Personal information
- Full name: Raymond James Bright
- Born: 13 July 1954 (age 72); Footscray, Victoria, Australia
- Nickname: Candles
- Height: 170 cm (5 ft 7 in)
- Batting: Right-handed
- Bowling: Slow left arm orthodox
- Role: Bowler

International information
- National side: Australia
- Test debut (cap 280): 7 July 1977 v England
- Last Test: 19 October 1986 v India
- ODI debut (cap 19): 30 March 1974 v New Zealand
- Last ODI: 11 April 1986 v Pakistan

Domestic team information
- Years: Team
- 1972–1988: Victoria

Career statistics
Competition	Tests	ODI	FC	LA
Matches	25	11	184	47
Runs scored	445	66	4,130	458
Batting average	14.35	16.50	21.07	19.08
100s/50s	0/0	0/0	2/12	0/2
Top score	33	19*	108	70
Balls bowled	5,541	462	37,912	2,367
Wickets	53	3	471	40
Bowling average	41.13	116.66	32.08	41.12
5 wickets in innings	4	0	24	0
10 wickets in match	1	0	2	0
Best bowling	7/87	1/28	7/87	3/30
Catches/stumpings	13/–	2/–	107/–	11/–
- Source: Cricinfo, 29 January 2017

Raymond James Bright (born 13 July 1954) is a former Australian Test and One Day International cricketer from Victoria. He was a left arm spin bowler and right handed lower order batsman who captained Victoria for a number of seasons. He was also an Australian vice-captain.

Bright made his One Day International debut for Australia on the tour of New Zealand in the 1973/74 season. He also toured New Zealand in the 1976–77 season, and he then toured England in 1977, and made his Test debut in the Second Test at Old Trafford. Over the next decade he was a fixture in the Australian squad without ever holding down a regular place in the Test or One Day teams, playing in only twenty-five Tests and eleven One Day Internationals during his twelve-year international career. However he did play in fifteen Supertests for the Australian XI during World Series Cricket in 1977–78 and 1978–79, taking 42 wickets at an average of 29 against the West Indies and World XI.

Arguably his finest moment in international cricket came in the famous tied Test in Madras against India in 1986, when he took 5 for 94 in India's second innings. He also captained Australia in one match (a loss), his final One Day International appearance for his country, against Pakistan in April 1986.

Gideon Haigh once wrote that "for a time, Ray Bright was colloquially and rather meanly known for having made almost as many tours as he had played Tests." Bright was selected on a large number of Australian touring squads, including ones to New Zealand (1973–74, 1976–77, 1978, 1981–82 and 1985–86), England (1977, 1980 and 1981), the West Indies (1978–79), Pakistan (1979–80 and 1982–83), Sri Lanka (1980–81), Sharjah (1986) and India (1986–87).

== Career ==
A left-arm orthodox spin bowler and useful lower order right-handed batsman, Bright made his club debut for Footscray in 1969/70.

=== 1971 Sheffield Shield debut ===
In December 1971 he was picked for Victoria against Western Australia. He was aged 17, the youngest player picked for the state since World War Two. However he was only 12th man.

He played for Victoria colts and toured Sri Lanka.

=== 1972–73 season ===
Bright found his way back into the Victorian team for the 1972–73 season. His first class debut was against NSW. He took 2–32 and 1–64 and made 67 as a nightwatchman.

Bright kept his place in the Victorian side for the rest of the season.

=== 1973–74 season: Australian selection ===
Bright played well during the 1973–74 season. He took 6–61 and 1–27 against South Australia, 4–41 against WA, took part in a century partnership in a Victoria vs New Zealand game, took 5–75 against WA and 3–8 against SA.

9–55 against Queensland saw his name start to be mentioned as an international prospect. He ended up taking 32 wickets over the summer at an average of 19.6.

He was a "bolter" selection on the 1973–74 tour of New Zealand, replacing Terry Jenner as the third spin option after Ashley Mallett and Kerry O'Keefe. He was the youngest Australian sent abroad since the selectors sent Ian Craig and Ron Archer (18) to England in 1953,

== Australian Tour Debut ==
=== 1973–74 Tour of New Zealand ===
Bright made his debut for Australia in a one-day game against Wellington taking 2–15. He only took one wicket in his first first-class game for Australia, against Canterbury. He took one wicket against Auckland but four against Northern Districts. He only took 8 first class wickets on the tour but had a healthy average of 21.87.

He also made his one-day international debut on tour, playing in the third ODI against New Zealand. Bright made 0–44.

=== 1974 Lancashire League ===
Bright expected to spend the 1974 winter at home when he received a call from the Ramsbottom Club in the Lancashire League. Their current professional player, Wasim Raja, had been called up by Pakistan and they needed a replacement. Bright accepted the offer despite only having three weeks notice. His fee was £1,500 but he had to pay his air fare out of that, so he was forced to get a job as well. He worked a bleaching and dyeing factory.

Bright had little luck on his first weekend and says he "got abused by 500 workers" at this factory on Monday. He added, "You're obviously expected to bat in the top four, and if you don't get some runs or get some wickets, particularly if the side's not doing very well, the locals do tend to let you know very quickly that you've been the worst pro the club's ever had."

However his form improved. Bright said "What I found, probably because I've got very hard hands, early on I was tending to balloon a few to mid off or mid on, which a lot of Australians tend to do on soft wickets. It was a matter of adapting to different conditions and, quite often, the bowlers are a bit slower than what you're used to facing in first class cricket back home."

Bright ended up taking 523 runs for the season at 30.8 and 73 wickets at 9.7. Ramsbottom won the championship for just the third time in their history.

=== 1974–75 and 1975–76 seasons ===
Bright was considered a strong prospect for the 1975 tour of England but found things tougher going at home over the following summer, taking took 10 wickets at 68.6 with a best result of 3–67. At one stage Victorian captain Ian Redpath would bowl himself instead of Bright. "There could have been no more humiliating comment on his form," according to one writer. Australian selectors preferred Terry Jenner and Ashley Mallett as spinners in the test team that summer, and Jim Higgs was picked to go to England in 1975.

Bright attributed his poor form in part to his league stint in England, saying "the wickets were so slow that I ended up bowling a lot quicker. It took me a long, long time to renegotiate what I needed to do in Australian conditions." He added that "another thing was that the batsman weren't taking any risks against me. Before that I suppose they had underestimated me, but after I was selected for New Zealand they took no risks and I had to really fight for my wicket."

Bright's form recovered over the 1975–76 season, taking 22 first class wickets at 27.68. Instead of returning to Ramsbottom over the 1976 English summer, he stayed in Australia and focused on his fitness. He trained with his local Australian rules club Spotswood, for whom he had once played.

=== 1976–77 season ===
He won man of the match for the Gilette Cup semi final against NSW, taking 3–30 and scoring 55 not out in a partnership with Trevor Laughlin that won Victoria the game.

That summer Bright took 19 wickets at an average of 25 making him one of the better performing spinners in the country. Bright attributed this success in part to captain Richie Robinson giving him "more responsibility by allowing me to bowl for longer periods. these days I'm averaging between 20 and 30 overs. Previously it was only 10–12."

"I've been trying to give the ball that extra tweak," added Bright. "You find, especially against the good batsmen, that you have to do something more than just bowl accurately. I'm glad I was born a left arm bowler. Those sort of bowlers, especially spinners, are a very rare breed in Australia. Batsmen here don't get much practice against a left hander. Anything you can do a little different is a help."

Bright's claim for national selection was helped by retirements of Ashley Mallett and Terry Jenner as well as the poor batting and fielding of rivals David Hourn and Jim Higgs. He was picked on the 1977 Tour of New Zealand. Kim Hughes was meant to be 12th man for the third test against Pakistan, but when he fell injured Ray Bright stepped in. There was some talk he might even play that game in tandem with Kerry O'Keefe but in the end Australia went with one spinner.

==== 1977 Tour of New Zealand ====
Bright was the second spinner in the squad, after Kerry O'Keefe. He took five wickets against Otago. and he and O'Keefe ended up taking two-thirds of the wickets on the early part of the tour, Bright with 25 wickets at an average of 14.

Bright was selected in the 12 for the first test but was made 12th man when the Australian selectors decided to keep faith in Gary Gilmour. A draw in the first test saw Greg Chappell consider dropping a batsman to make way for Bright but he eventually decided against it.

In March 1977 Cricketer published a list of Ashes squads from seventeen different experts. Every single squad had Bright and Kerry O'Keefe in it as spinners. Bright was 12th man for the Centenary Test. He fielded throughout England's two innings as substitute for Rick McCosker who had suffered a broken jaw when batting in Australia's first innings. Following the test's completion it was announced Bright was on the 1977 tour of England.

== Test debut ==
=== 1977 Tour of England: Test debut ===
Early in the tour it was announced that Bright had signed to play World Series Cricket.

Bright had solid form early in the tour, particularly with the bat. He took 4–63 against Gloucestershire and at one stage his batting average was 107. He took 5–91 against Worcestershire.

Bright made his ODI debut in the second one dayer, but only bowled three overs. He was given 11 overs in the third game, taking 1–56.

Bright was in the original 13 man squad for the first test but O'Keeffe was preferred as sole spinner. Australia lost the game and Bright further pressed his claims with 3–34 against Nottinghamshire. By this stage he was leading Australia's tour bowling averages with 20 wickets at 16.

Australia decided to play two spinners for the second, allowing Bright to make his test debut. He took 3–69 in an Australian defeat. He was 12th man for the third test as Australia went back to 3 pacemen but 5–67 against Lancashire saw him reach 35 wickets for the tour at 20. For the 4th test O'Keeffe was dropped in favour of Bright. Bright took 2–66.

Bright kept his spot for the rain-shortened final test. He scored 15 and only bowled six overs.

He ended the tour with 39 wickets at 20.

== World Series Cricket ==
Bright signed with World Series Cricket. He and Kerry O'Keeffe were the two Australian spinners.

His signing meant he was banned from training with the Victorian squad. Bright later said he had "no complaints. Much more security with Packer. I could have got dropped back from England and been dropped from the Victorian side."

=== 1977–78 ===
Bright began the 1977–78 summer well taking 5–54 for a Richie Robinson XI against an Ian Chappell XI. In a four-day trial match for WSC Australia against a World XI, Bright made 47 in Australia's first innings, helping them revive from a collapse, and taking three wickets. These efforts saw him picked over O'Keefe and Mallett to be Australia's spinner in the first supertest against the West Indies XI.

Australia batted first and collapsed to 6–66 when Bright came out to bat; he helped lead a late innings rally to 256, with Bright the top scorer on 69. However he was used sparingly as a bowler, taking 1–15 and 0–10 as Australia lost by three wickets.

Bright took 1–62 in a one-day game against the World XI. In the second Supertest he took 2–75 and 0–18 and made two run outs, but Australia lost again. Things were better in the third match, were Bright's hauls of 2–18 and 4–74 helped Australia to a 220 run win.

Bright only bowled four overs in the rain-shortened, low scoring 4th test, which Australia lost against the World XI.

In a one-day game against the West Indies he took 4–37, almost helping Australia win the game. In the final event the West Indies won by one wicket.

Bright had another strong game in the fifth test, against the World XI. Barry Richards, Gordon Greenidge and Viv Richards took their toll on Australia's bowlers, but Bright fought back to finish with 5–149. He scored 41 in Australia's first dig but they lost the game by an innings and 73 runs. He took 2–38 in the final of the International Cup, which Australia lost to the West Indies and 1–32 in the final of the Country Cup, against the World XI, which Australia also lost.

Bright ended the summer well in the 6th Supertest, against the World XI, taking 3–98 in the first innings and scoring 25 crucial runs in an Australian XI second innings collapse, and taking two catches. These contributions turned out to be crucial in Australia's final victory.

He took 17 supertest wickets for the summerall up at an average of 28.8 and scored 192 runs at an average of 21.

=== 1978 Tour of New Zealand ===
World Series Cup players toured New Zealand in November 1978. Bright took 1–9 in a four-day game against the World XI, then played in several one day games: 1–10, 0–55, 2–34, did not bowl, 0–30, 0–21, and did not bowl

=== 1978–79 Summer ===
Back in Australia, Bright took 3–57 against the World XI in a one-day match against the World XI, followed by 0–29.

In the first Supertest, against the World XI, he took 1–21 and 3–81 in an Australian loss A series of one day games followed: 1–24 against the WSC Cavaliers, 0–24 against the Cavaliers, 1–27 (Cavaliers), 3–33 (West Indies), did not bowl (World XI), 1–17 (World XI), and 1–44 (Cavaliers).

For the second Supertest, against the West Indies XI he took 3–113 and 0–36, as well as 41 runs in total.

For the third Supertest against the West Indies XI, Kerry O'Keefe was drafted into the squad as a possible support for Bright but he ultimately did not play. Bright had a brilliant game taking 6–52 and 1–12, helping Australia to a rare (ten wicket) victory and winning the Man of the Match Award.

This victory saw Australia get into the final against the World XI. They lost by five wickets. Bright again scored some useful lower order runs and took one wicket.

=== 1979 Tour of the West Indies ===
Bright went to the West Indies with the Australian XI for World Series Cricket. He took 1–40 in a one-day game.

In the first Supertest, Bright was one of the more successful bowlers, taking 2–20 and 2–108; his second innings of 47 not out was Australia's highest.in the game as they crashed to defeat by 369 runs. Australia then lost another ODI, Bright taking one wicket.

Bright batted well in the second test too, making 37 and 22; he picked up 2–22 and 0–16.

Australia won a thrilling third Supertest by 27 runs; however it was Ian Chappell (3–35), not Bright, who bowled them to victory at the end. Bright took 1–28 and 1–68. He took 1–78 and scored 29 not out in the fourth test, famously shortened by a riot.

In one day games he took 1–34 0–43 and 1–31. He struggled with the ball in the final Supertest, taking 1–60, but took part in a crucial second innings partnership with Rod Marsh which helped secure a draw – Bright was not out on 56. He was at the wicket when the last ball of unofficial World Series Cricket was bowled.

Bright had enjoyed an excellent World Series Cricket, being Australia's number one spinner for the entire time.

"Rod Marsh and I were the only two that played in all of the Supertests," said Bright. "Fourteen all up, ten in Australia and four in the West Indies. They were probably my best two years, believe it or not."

=== 1979 in England ===
Bright received another call from a club in the Lancashire League, when East Lancashire needed a replacement for Peter Sleep, who was touring India with the official Australian team. He took 41 wickets at an average of 11.85. He also participated in a single wicket competition against such players as David Gower and Zaheer Abbas.

== Post World Series Cricket ==
=== 1979–80 Season ===
Victoria had won the Sheffield Shield in 1978–79 but Bright went straight back into the state squad along with fellow WSC players Richie Robinson and Max Walker.

Bright was injured early during the 1979–80 season.

"We were playing a Shield game in Queensland and I threw my arm out on the day before the match," he recalls. "I lost a lot of power, and a lot of things I could do before I wasn't able to do. So I probably changed my technique after that to get more side-on, but I probably got more back-on. I was coming in to bowl but I was facing the wrong way. I thought I was doing the right thing by changing things, but it didn't work... Nowadays I would've had a shoulder operation... I got told I could have one, but it was really up to me to organise."

Bright was picked in the Australian side to play in the first test against the West Indies. It was the first "reunited" Australian side since World Series players returned to the fold. The day after his selection Bright won match of the match in a McDonald's Cup semi final taking 3–30 against Tasmania. In the test, Bright took 1–97.

Bright played several one day games, against the West Indies (0–26), England (1–40) and the West Indies (0–29). He was then dropped for the next one day game.

He played in the first test against England, taking 1–36. He was kept in the squad for the next game, the second test against the West Indies but was made 12th man in favour of Jim Higgs.

Bright was dropped for the second test against England in favour of Ian Chappell. He only took seven first class wickets over the summer at an average of 63.85. Greg Chappell thought this was a delayed reaction to "intimidatory batting" during World Series Cricket. "A lot of spinners would probably have wilted in WSC but Brighty stood up to it well. WSC, though, probably changed his game a bit, got him bowling a bit more defensively and it eventually cost him a bit of his bite. He'd had as tough a task as any young spinner could've had, bowling against the top twenty or thirty batsmen in the world day in, day out. And that eventually took its toll mentally."

Nonetheless, Bright was picked on the 1980 Tour of Pakistan.

==== 1980 Tour of Pakistan ====
Bright bowled well early in the tour, taking 5–93 and 6–29 against the BCCP President's XI.

This saw him was picked in the 12 for the first test along with Graeme Beard. Pakistan prepared a spin friendly pitch. Australia were dismissed for 225, with Iqbal Qasim and Tauseef Ahmed taking four wickets each. Bright kept Australia in the game with his 7–87, keeping Pakistan for 292. "I found the wicket helpful but the turn was very slow and it made me really concentrate on my line", said Bright.

However Australia collapsed for 140 in the second innings, Qasim and Ahmed taking all ten wickets between them. Bright took 3–23 in Pakistan's second innings but Australia lost by three wickets.

Pakistani ground keepers prepared very batting friendly strips for the last two test matches, which both ended in draws. Bright made 0–71 in the second test After making 52 in a tour game and 5–172 in the third.

Bright took 29 wickets on tour for 19.24.

=== 1980 Tour of England ===
Bright's efforts earned him selection on the 1980 tour to England to play the second Centenary Test. He was one of two spinners, the other being Ashley Mallett.

Bright played well against Hampshire but did not overly impress in other games on the tour. (He only took 7 first class wickets on the whole tour for an average of 41.)

He played in a sole one day international and was named in the final 12 for the 1980 Centenary Test along with Ashley Mallet. The selectors decided to play two spinners, and Bright went wicketless over 46 overs, making 0–50 and 0–44.

=== 1980–81 season ===
Bright did not have a particularly successful season with the ball in 1980–81, obtaining 22 wickets at 40. However he did make a first class century, 108 against Tasmania. He also took 4–59 in the same game. He scored 70 in a McDonald's Cup game against WA.

At the end of the summer, Bright was picked on the 1981 tour of England. He was selected over Bruce Yardley who had more wickets for a lesser average and had been playing tests for Australia; Bob Holland and Peter Sleep also had better figures than Bright. According to one report "the Victorian [Bright] was not everybody's choice to make the tour. He has been to England twice before, with little success, and apart from a fruitful series on the Pakistan wickets last year has only a moderate Test record."

=== 1981 Tour of England ===
Bright began the tour poorly, struggling the Sri Lankan leg of the tour, and in early games. However 3 wickets against Glamorgan improved his confidence.

Bright was picked for the first test but ended up being relegated to 12th man as Australia went for an all pace attack. An injury to Rodney Hogg saw him picked in the second test. He had only taken ten wickets but many of the tour games had been shortened by rain and his experience got him preferred to Graeme Beard. Bright played well, taking 1–31 and 3–67 as well as scoring 33 (which would be his highest official test score). The game ended in a draw.

5–57 against Northamptonshire helped Bright keep his spot for the third test. This was the famous "miracle match" at Headingley. Bright was not used at all in England's first innings and only bowled four overs in the second innings, despite Ian Botham's famous counter-attacking knock which helped England win the game after following on. Bright was the last man dismissed. Hughes later admitted not bowling Bright more in England's second innings was a big mistake.

Bright played in the 4th test, scoring 27 runs as a nightwatchman and taking 2–20 and 5–68 with the ball. He bowled "with a clever variation of flight and pace" and put Australia in a winning position, requiring only 151 to win. However Australia collapsed and lost. He had less success in the 5th test, taking 0–30 and 1–68 or the 6th, taking 0–41 and 0–50.

Bright took 40 wickets on tour at an average of 26.4.

=== 1981–82 season ===
Bright was considered a favorite to maintain his place in the Australian side at the beginning of the 1981–82 summer. However he lost his place to Bruce Yardley, who went on to have a magnificent season. He was picked in a 13-man test squad to play the West Indies but did not make the final 12. He was kept in the squad for the second test but did not play either. However he was picked to play on the 1982 tour of New Zealand, in support of Yardley.

Bright took 20 wickets over the summer at 37.1.

==== 1982 Tour of New Zealand ====
Bright was left out of the test side. He did not bowl particularly impressively in the tour games, only taking two first class wickets in total. There was a possibility Bright would come in as spinner for the third test but it did not happen.

=== 1982 Tour of Pakistan ===
Bright was picked on the 1982 tour of Pakistan, where Bright had enjoyed success before. Captain Kim Hughes said "the spinning combination of Ray Bright and Bruce Yardley, the left- and right-arm orthodox bowlers, gives us a better balance [than on the 1980 tour] and makes me optimistic of winning the series."

Bright took four wickets in a tour game and was picked for the first test against Pakistan, playing in tandem with Yardley. He made 3–96 and 0–14.

Bright kept his spot for the second test but suffered badly at the hands of Pakistan batsmen, going for 0–107, as well as scoring a pair. He was dropped for the third test in favor of Terry Alderman.

Bright took 12 wickets at 30 on the tour, but his performance was generally considered disappointing.

=== 1982–83 season ===
Bright was unable to force his way back into the Australian side during 1982–83. He began the season poorly and was even dropped from the Victorian side for a one-day game. However, by the end of the season he had taken 31 first class wickets at 38.67 and was given the job of captaining Victoria for the first time against Sri Lanka.

=== 1983–84 and 1984–85 seasons ===
Victoria had won two wooden spoons in a row and Graham Yallop was axed as captain at the end of the 1982–83 season. Bright was appointed in his stead at the beginning of the 1983–84 season.

He later said this may have affected his bowling. "When I became captain of Victoria, we didn't have a great side, we never had a lot of runs to play with, and the MCG wicket being what it was with no bounce, and with that being my home ground we played five games there every year, the mentality may have gone a bit too defensive."

He struggled in 83–84 taking 20 wickets at 54.3. The Australian selectors tried several other spinners during this time – Greg Matthews, Murray Bennett and Tom Hogan.

He had a very strong domestic summer in 1984–85, taking 40 wickets at 30.45, making him one of the best performing spinners. However the Australian selectors went with Matthew, Bennett and Bob Holland for the tests and the 1985 tour of England.

Bright's name was linked with early reports of the rebel cricket sides to tour South Africa. Bright said he had not been approached but would consider any offer. In the end it was Trevor Hohns and Tom Hogan who toured.

This season was his last for Footscray. For the next two summers he would play club cricket for North Melbourne-Geelong.

== Test recall ==
=== 1985–86 season ===
Australia's spin bowlers, Holland, Matthews and Bennett, did not have a particularly strong tour of England, and Australia were beaten badly in the first home test of the summer, against New Zealand.

Bright was picked in the Australian side for the second test against New Zealand at the spin-friendly SCG, replacing an unfit Geoff Lawson as a third spin option (alongside Bob Holland and Greg Matthews). Bright had not been expected to play – most observers thought Murray Bennett, who was in strong form and had toured England in 1985 would get the nod.

According to one report, "Bright has played in 16 Tests after making his debut... His gritty outlook and stubborn tactics has not always endeared him, particularly as the Victorian leader. But his determined, sometimes abrasive stance, is what is needed to counter the exultant New Zealanders."

Bright ended up having an excellent game, taking 2–87 and 3–39 and helping Australia win the match.

Allan Border praised the contribution to the side made by the return of veterans Bright and David Hookes. "Now there's a lot more experience in the side with Hookes and Bright," he said. "It's a lot easier on me. With the side in England and even in the first Test against New Zealand there was basically only me that would say anything of a stern nature or a congratulatory nature. But we've got Hookesy now walking around and really giving Craig McDermott a big rocket or a positive word. The way Ray and David keep an eye on things, it's not just me any more. The feeling over the past few weeks has been great but now there's a greater commitment."

Bright was picked in the 12 for the third test but did not play, with Australia picking a third pace bowler. He was preferred to Bob Holland for the first test against India, taking 1–80.

Bright took 6–74 against NSW in a Shield game which ensured his retention for the second test against India. He took 0–76 but scored 28 runs in the first innings.

He kept his place for the third test, and even though it was at the spin friendly SCG, was badly mauled by the Indian batsmen, taking 0–121. (In Bright's defence, other Australian spinners also fared poorly – and Bright had to deal with an inexperienced wicketkeeper in Wayne Phillips.)

That summer, Bright became Victoria's most capped player with 100 games, overtaking Bill Lawry's record of 99. He ultimately took 27 wickets at 37.92.

Despite his poor results against India, Bright was picked as spinner and vice captain on the New Zealand tour. He was also made captain of Australia for a short one day international tour of the United Arab Emirates.

And he was picked in the 13-man Australian one day squad for the finals. However he did not play any games.

=== 1985–86 Tour of New Zealand: Australian vice captain ===
As well as being vice captain, Bright was one of the selectors of the Australian tour party (along with Allan Border and David Boon). Border and Bright were the only members of the squad who had toured New Zealand before.

Bright began the tour well with 5–42 against Northern Districts. He was 12th man for the first test as Border felt the pitch was more suited to a seamer. He played the second test making 0–51. His batting was useful helping Australia escape with a draw.

Bright led Australia for the first time in a one-day game against Nelson. He captained Australia in a three-day game against Central Districts, which ended in a draw.

He was kept on for the third test making 2–58 and 0–29.

He was left out of the team for the first one-day internationals. Australia lost, Allan Border threatened to resign, and Ray Bright, as vice captain, chaired a meeting of the players which resulting in them reiterating support for their captain.

Bright was back in the team for the third game, taking 0–31 and at the crease when Australia won a thrilling victory. Bright was so over joyed he smashed the stumps. Australia won the fourth game which Bright played but did not bowl in. He took 9 first class wickets at 33 for the tour.

Coach Bob Simpson said the team were "most fortunate" to have Ray Bright as vice captain on tour since his "attitude and application have been an inspiration to the whole touring party."

=== 1986 Tour of Sharjah: Australian captain ===
The tour of the UAE followed, where Bright captained the side. Australia only played one game, against Pakistan. Australia made 7–202, which Pakistan reached in 49 overs for the loss of two wickets. Bright took 1–28.

=== 1986 Tour of India: The second tied Test ===
Bright was still chosen on the tour of India, as the second spinner alongside Greg Matthews. He ended up playing all three tests.

Bright began the tour badly taking 0–55 and 0–61 in a tour game. He took four wickets in 3 matches at an average of 245 and was considered likely to be made 12th man for the first test. However Border decided to go with two spinners, Bright and Matthews.

"Touring India is not how it is now," recalled Bright. "I was crook for the match. The gut; why would you eat a pizza in India? The night before the game I did the right thing and had an early night instead of having a few extra beers with (Bruce) Reid, (David) Boon, Border, (Geoff) Marsh, etcetera, who liked a couple. I thought ‘no, I'll have an early night and be ready for tomorrow’, but the room service pizza wasn't what it was supposed to be. Fortunately we won the toss and batted, as I would have been struggling to bowl that next day."

Bright was nightwatchman. He ended up scoring 30 and taking part in a partnership with Dean Jones, who made 210. "It was one of the better efforts of human endurance I've seen," said Bright. "He was very ill, we were all very ill. To get through that, with the heat being unbearable, but he was good enough to hit the singles when he needed to and get the fours when they were there. The good thing was that he had to spend the night in hospital on a saline drip so we didn't have to spend the night hearing about how good a knock it was." This was a considerable change from Jones' debut for Victoria aged 20, when after making 39 Bright stood up in the dressing room and branded him "the worst batsman I've ever seen play for Victoria", despite Jones facing Dennis Lillee at the WACA.

Bright took 2–88 in the first innings. In the second innings temperatures reached 40 degrees and 80% humidity.

"The quicks didn't bowl much, because it was too hot," said Bright. "The worst thing was the humidity. There was no such thing as a warm up, and the canal out the back, I think it is called the Buckingham Canal, was like an open sewer, so imagine when it is 45 degrees and very humid. It was just horrendous. I'd never known anything like it."

Bright collapsed and had to be helped from the field. "Ray was 32 years old and, putting it politely, he wasn't fit," says Greg Matthews. "People don't understand how good Ray Bright was in that match, because without him we would have been beaten. To me it sits alongside Rick McCosker's effort in the Centenary Test for bravery."

Bright returned to the field and took the wickets of Chetan Sharma and Kiran More. Then with two overs to go, India required seven runs with two wickets in hand. Bright bowled the penultimate over and dismissed Shivalv Yadav, ending the game with 5–94. Matthews got a wicket in the last over and the match was a tie.

He did not get a chance to bowl in the rain shortened second test and went for 1–109 in the third.

== Later career ==
=== 1986–88: Final years ===
In the 1986–87 summer, Bright was omitted for the first two tests against England, as Australia elected to go with one spinner, Matthews.

Bright took seven wickets for Victoria against South Australia. He was recalled to the Australian team for the 3rd test of the 1986–87 Ashes. However he was made 12th man in favour of Peter Sleep. He was dropped from the squad for the fourth test. Australia dropped Greg Matthews for the fifth test but tried a new spinner, Peter Taylor, instead of Bright.

Bright was injured towards the end of the 1986–87 season. He led the Victorian team to the Sheffield Shield final, but they lost to Western Australia. His shoulder injury called him to step down as Victorian captain at the end of the summer. He had a solid season, with 29 wickets at 31.41.

==== Later playing career ====
Bright was dropped from the Victoria side at the beginning of the 1987–88 summer. He was recalled but retired shortly afterwards.

In 1987 he was appointed captain and coach of Richmond Club, who he ended up playing for until 1995–96. Under Bright the Club won a First Eleven Premiership in 1989 – 90, a Club Championship in 1987 – 88 and the Second Eleven won Premierships in 1987 – 88, 1988 – 89 and 1990 – 91.

== Summary ==
Australia only won two of Bright's 25 Tests, and in Australia he averaged 68. He averaged 89 in draws, 50 in the first innings, 182 when Australia lost the toss and were put in (when he took a wicket every 83 overs). And in 19 of his 39 innings, he failed to take a wicket at all.

Despite a relatively modest international career, Bright was a stalwart at Australian domestic level for Victoria. He ended his first-class career with 471 wickets at an average of 32.08 and scored two centuries.

=== Post retirement career ===
Since retiring from playing professionally after the 1987–1988 season, Bright has served as a selector for the Victorian state team, as well as Under 17 and 19 teams. He has taken on a number of coaching roles. His son, Adam Bright, plays baseball for Australia.

In December 1990 he went for 1–109 in an Australian XI vs World XI game to raise funds for a school.

Bright became a Victoria selector in April 2002.

Ray has recently taken up the senior assistant coaching role with the Vermont South Cricket Club in the Box Hill Reporter league where his son Matt opens the bowling and batting in the 1st XI. Ray can usually be found in the newly constructed social rooms enjoying a quiet drink and entertaining many with tales of yesteryear.

He was cricket adviser on the mini series Howzat! Kerry Packer's War.

== Personal life ==
Bright was married twice. He met his English-born second wife, Jacquie, on the 1977 tour of England and has two sons.

== Career highlights ==
=== Tests ===
Test Debut: vs England, Manchester, 1977
Last Test: vs India, Mumbai, 1986–1987

- Bright's best Test batting score of 33 was made against England, Lord's, 1981
- His best Test bowling figures of 7 for 87 came against Pakistan, Karachi, 1979–1980

=== One-day internationals ===
ODI Debut: vs New Zealand, Dunedin, 1973–1974
Last ODI: vs Pakistan, Sharjah, 1985–1986

- Bright's best ODI batting score of 19 not out was made against West Indies, Melbourne, 1979–1980
- His best ODI bowling figures of 1 for 28 came against Pakistan, Sharjah, 1985–1986
- He captained Australia in one ODI, a loss
