= Australian cricket team in England in 1980 =

International cricket tour

The Australian cricket team in England in 1980 played 5 first-class matches including the Centenary Test to mark 100 years of Test cricket in England. It was during the Centenary Test that John Arlott gave his last commentary for the BBC's Test Match Special.

== Australian squad ==
The Australian squad selected for the tour by Sam Loxton, Alan Davidson, Phil Ridings and Ray Lindwall was as follows:

- Batsmen – Greg Chappell (captain), Kim Hughes (vice captain), Allan Border, Graeme Wood, Bruce Laird, John Dyson, Graham Yallop (back up wicketkeeper)
- Fast bowlers – Dennis Lillee, Len Pascoe, Jeff Thomson, Geoff Dymock
- Spinners – Ray Bright, Ashley Mallett,
- Wicketkeeper – Rod Marsh

Peter Toohey, Julien Wiener and Rick McCosker were considered unlucky to miss selection. Jim Higgs declared himself unable to tour.

== One Day Internationals (ODIs) ==
England won the Prudential Trophy 2–0.

=== 1st ODI ===
20 August 1980
Scorecard

England; 248/6 (55 overs)	v	Australia; 225/8 (55 overs)
G Boycott 99 (159); DK Lillee 4/35 (11 overs)		KJ Hughes 73* (102); M Hendrick 5/31 (11 overs)

England won by 23 runs
The Oval, London
Umpires: WE Alley and DGL Evans
Player of the match: M Hendrick (ENG)

- Australia won the toss and elected to field.
- CWJ Athey and AR Butcher (both ENG) made their ODI debuts.

=== 2nd ODI ===
22 August 1980
Scorecard

England; 320/8 (55 overs)	v	Australia; 273/5 (55 overs)
GA Gooch 108 (113); LS Pascoe 4/69 (11 overs)		KJ Hughes 98 (84); M Hendrick 3/54 (10 overs)

England won by 47 runs
Edgbaston, Birmingham
Umpires: HD Bird and DO Oslear
Player of the match: GA Gooch (ENG)

- Australia won the toss and elected to field.
- J Dyson (AUS) and RO Butcher (ENG) made their ODI debuts.

== Test match summary ==
28 August–2 September 1980
(5-day match)
Scorecard

Australia	v	England
385/5d (134 overs); KJ Hughes 117 (209); CM Old 3/91 (35 overs)		205 (63.2 overs); G Boycott 62 (146); LS Pascoe 5/59 (18 overs)
189/4d (53.2 overs); KJ Hughes 84 (99); CM Old 3/47 (20 overs)		244/3 (82 overs); G Boycott 128* (252); DK Lillee 1/53 (19 overs)

Match drawn
Lord's, London
Umpires: HD Bird and DJ Constant
Player of the match: KJ Hughes (AUS)

- Australia won the toss and elected to bat.
- 31 August was taken as a rest day.
- CWJ Athey (ENG) made his Test debut.

== External sources ==
- CricketArchive itinerary

== Annual reviews ==
- Playfair Cricket Annual 1981
- Wisden Cricketers' Almanack 1981
