= Australian cricket team in New Zealand in 1976–77 =

International cricket tour

The Australian cricket team toured New Zealand in the 1976–77 season to play a two-match Test series against New Zealand. Australia won the series 1–0.

== Australian squad ==
The original squad selected was as follows:

- Batsmen – Greg Chappell (captain), Ian Davis, Alan Turner, Rick McCosker, Gary Cosier, Doug Walters, Kim Hughes
- Fastbowlers – Dennis Lillee, Max Walker, Alan Hurst
- Spinners – Ray Bright, Kerry O'Keeffe
- All rounders – Gary Gilmour
- Wicketkeepers – Rod Marsh
- Manager – Roger Wotton

== Test series summary ==
=== First Test ===
18–23 February 1977
(5-day match)
Scorecard

Australia	v	New Zealand
552 (110.5 overs); KD Walters 250 (342); EJ Chatfield 3/125 (31 overs)		357 (95.2 overs); MG Burgess 66 (95); KJ O'Keeffe 5/101 (28 overs)
154/4d (43 overs); RB McCosker 77* (129); DR Hadlee 1/28 (8 overs)		293/8 (84 overs); BE Congdon 107* (251); MHN Walker 4/65 (25 overs)

Match drawn
Lancaster Park, Christchurch
Umpires: DEA Copps and FR Goodall

- New Zealand won the toss and elected to field.
- 21 February was taken as a rest day.
- GN Edwards (NZ) made his Test debut.

=== Second Test ===
25 February–1 March 1977
(5-day match)
Scorecard

New Zealand	v	Australia
229 (66.3 overs); GP Howarth 59 (164); DK Lillee 5/51 (17.3 overs)		377 (97.1 overs); RB McCosker 84 (186); EJ Chatfield 4/100 (27.1 overs)
175 (42.7 overs); RJ Hadlee 81 (105); DK Lillee 6/72 (15.7 overs)		28/0 (3.5 overs); A Turner 20* (24)

Australia won by 10 wickets
Eden Park, Auckland
Umpires: DEA Copps and WRC Gardiner

- Australia won the toss and elected to field.
- 28 February was taken as a rest day.
- The match was scheduled for five days but completed in four.
