= Australian cricket team in Pakistan in 1979–80 =

International cricket tour

Australian cricket team in Pakistan in 1979-80
	Australia	Pakistan
- Dates: 22 February 1980 – 23 March 1980
Captains	Greg Chappell	Javed Miandad

Test series
- Result: Pakistan won the 3-match series 1–0
Most runs	Allan Border (395); Greg Chappell (381)	Taslim Arif (307); Majid Khan (199)
Most wickets	Ray Bright (15)	Iqbal Qasim (16)

The Australian cricket team toured Pakistan in February to March 1980 to play a three-match Test series against Pakistan. Pakistan won the test series 1–0.

== Summary ==
The Series was Javed Miandad's first as a captain, following the retirement of Asif Iqbal. Pakistan was criticised by analysts for producing doctored pitches that were seen to neutralize Australian pace bowler Dennis Lillee who ended the three test series with only 3 wickets.

The first test in Karachi, saw Pakistan come away victors, and gave Miandad his first test victory as captain, after limiting Australia to only 225 and 140, leaving a Day 4 chase of only 74, which Pakistan chased down for the loss of only three wickets.

In the second test at Faisalabad, after no play was possible on the first day, Australia would bat until Day 4 and the game would finish with Pakistan only two wickets down in their first innings but still 235 runs behind Australia. Overall 336 overs were bowled in the match for only 12 wickets. While Australia would create their own history, by bowling all 11 players, including wicket keeper Rod Marsh who would bowl 10 overs alone.

The third and final test in Lahore would again finish in a draw, with both teams declaring their first innings for over 400 runs, but Australia would bat out the final day, ensuring Pakistan a 1-0 series win.

== Background ==
There was some doubt as to whether the tour would go ahead due to financial problems. Eventually the tour guarantee was increased and the number of games played cut from eight matches to five with three test matches and two 3-day games.

== Australian squad ==
It was the first tour by an Australian team since the peace treaty between the Australian Cricket Board and World Series Cricket. The original squad selected was as follows:

- Batsmen - Greg Chappell (captain), Kim Hughes (vice-captain), Allan Border, Graham Yallop, Bruce Laird, Julien Wiener, David Hookes
- Fast bowlers - Dennis Lillee, Geoff Dymock, Mick Malone, Geoff Lawson
- Spinners - Graeme Beard, Ray Bright
- Wicketkeeper - Rod Marsh

== Tour Matches ==
22–24 February 1980
(3–day match)
Scorecard

Australians	v	BCCP President's XI
223/10 (77.2 overs); Rodney Marsh 52; Aftab Baloch 4/51 (24.2)		209/7 (77.3 overs); Azmat Rana (82); Ray Bright 5/93 (33.3)
203/5 (58 overs); Bruce Laird (82); Aftab Baloch 3/70 (18)		81/9 (46 overs); Rizwan-uz-Zaman 25; Ray Bright 6/29 (20)

Match drawn
Pindi Club Ground, Rawalpindi
Umpires: Javed Akhtar (Pak) Khizer Hayat (Pak)

- No toss

March 13–15, 1980
(3–day match)
Scorecard

Australians	v	Punjab Governor's XI
213/10 (64 overs); Ray Bright (52); Ilyas Khan 4/62 (22.1)		323/10; Azhar Khan (100); Geoff Lawson 4/46 (19)
302/10 (110.2); Allan Border (178); Rashid Khan 3/50 (23)		88/1 (24 overs); Saleem Yousuf (58*); Geoff Lawson 1/36 (5)

Match drawn
Ibn-e-Qasim Bagh Stadium, Multan
Umpires: Amanullah Khan (Pak) Shakoor Rana (Pak)

- No toss

== Test series summary ==
=== First Test ===
27 February – 2 March 1980
(5–day match)
Scorecard

Australia	v	Pakistan
225 (95.2 overs); KJ Hughes 85 (156); Tauseef Ahmed 4/64 (30.2 overs)		292 (118.5 overs); Majid Khan 89 (239); RJ Bright 7/87 (46.5 overs)
140 (90 overs); AR Border 58* (202); Iqbal Qasim 7/49 (42 overs)		76/3 (25.1 overs); Javed Miandad 21 (39); RJ Bright 3/24 (11 overs)

Pakistan won by 7 wickets
National Stadium, Karachi
Umpires: Mahboob Shah and Shakoor Rana

- Australia won the toss and elected to bat.
- 1 March was taken as a rest day.
- The match was scheduled for five days but completed in four.
- GR Beard (AUS) and Tauseef Ahmed (PAK) made their Test debuts.

=== Second Test ===
6 – 11 March 1980
(5–day match)
Scorecard

Australia	v	Pakistan
617 (211 overs); GS Chappell 235 (363); Tauseef Ahmed 3/77 (33 overs)		382/2 (126 overs); Taslim Arif 210* (379); G Dymock 1/49 (20 overs)

Match drawn
Iqbal Stadium, Faisalabad
Umpires: Javed Akhtar and Khalid Aziz

- Australia won the toss and elected to bat.
- 9 March was taken as a rest day.
- There was no play on the first day.
- All 11 Australian players bowled for first time in their test history

=== Third Test ===
18 – 23 March 1980
(5–day match)
Scorecard

Australia	v	Pakistan
407/7d (142 overs); AR Border 150* (281); Iqbal Qasim 4/90 (39 overs)		420/9d (140 overs); Majid Khan 110* (239); RJ Bright 5/172 (56 overs)
391/8 (116 overs); AR Border 153 (184); Imran Khan 2/30 (12 overs)

Match drawn
Gaddafi Stadium, Lahore
Umpires: Amanullah Khan and Khizer Hayat

- Australia won the toss and elected to bat.
- 20 March was taken as a rest day.
- Azhar Khan and Azmat Rana (both PAK) made their Test debuts.

== Impact ==
The tour was Javed Miandad's first series win as test captain of Pakistan. It was a notable personal success for Allan Border who scored over 600 runs, and a disappointment for David Hookes, who only scored 10 runs for the whole tour.
