= Australian cricket team in England in 1981 =

International cricket tour

1981 Ashes series
- Date: 18 June 1981 – 1 September 1981
- Location: England
- Result: England won the six-Test series 3–1
- Player of the series: Ian Botham (Eng)
Teams
- England: Australia
Captains
- Mike Brearley: Kim Hughes
Most runs
- Ian Botham (399) Geoff Boycott (392) Mike Gatting (370): Allan Border (533); Graham Yallop (316); Graeme Wood (310)
Most wickets
- Ian Botham (34) Bob Willis (29) Graham Dilley (14): Terry Alderman (42); Dennis Lillee (39); Geoff Lawson (12)

The tour by the Australian cricket team in England in 1981 included the 51st Ashes series of Test matches between Australia and England. Despite having been 1–0 down after two Tests, England won the next three to finish 3–1 victors (with two draws), thus retaining the Ashes.

== Australian squad ==
Australia's regular captain Greg Chappell made himself unavailable for selection, and Kim Hughes was re-instated. The Australian squad selected for the tour was as follows:

- Batsmen – Kim Hughes (captain), Allan Border, Graeme Wood, John Dyson, Graham Yallop, Martin Kent, Dirk Wellham, Trevor Chappell
- Fast bowlers – Dennis Lillee, Terry Alderman, Rodney Hogg, Geoff Lawson
- Spinners – Ray Bright, Graeme Beard
- Wicketkeeper – Rod Marsh, Steve Rixon

=== Selection controversies ===
Doug Walters was overlooked despite a strong summer at home. This resulted in protests from fans and Walters' eventual retirement from first class cricket.

Bruce Yardley had been Australia's most successful spinner that summer with 47 wickets, followed by Jim Higgs with 38. The selectors preferred Ray Bright (22 wickets at 40) and Graeme Beard (29 wickets at 25).

=== Replacements ===
Mike Whitney was called up as a replacement during the tour.

== Test series ==
Although the two teams were ranked below the mighty West Indies of that era, the 1981 Ashes is nevertheless widely regarded as one of the most entertaining Test series ever due to the see-sawing nature of both the individual games and the series as a whole.

England won the series 3–1 despite being 1–0 down after the first two Tests.

Before the third Test at Headingley, the inspirational Mike Brearley was reinstated as England captain, replacing Ian Botham, whose 12-Test tenure as captain had been winless and whose previously excellent form with both bat and ball had fallen away (he had made a pair in the second Test at Lord's).

The series turned around in the legendary third Test at Headingley. A galvanised Botham took 6 for 95 in Australia's first innings and scored 50 in England's, but Australia nonetheless compiled 401 for 9 declared (John Dyson scoring 102) and bowled England out for 174, thus forcing England to follow on 227 runs in arrears. Despite a stubborn 46 from Geoff Boycott, in the second innings Botham came to the crease with England on 105 for 5, still requiring 122 runs to avoid an innings defeat. He played an outstanding innings of 149 not out, sharing partnerships of 117 with Graham Dilley for the eighth wicket, 67 with Chris Old for the ninth and 37 with Bob Willis for the tenth, to set Australia a target of 130. Australia then reached 56 for 1, seemingly well set, before Brearley switched Willis's bowling end to allow him to bowl down the slope. Willis bowled a superb spell of 8 for 43 to dismiss Australia for 111; England became only the second team in Test Match history to win a match after being made to follow-on.

The fourth Test at Edgbaston was a similarly inspired comeback victory for England. England conceded a 69-run first innings deficit, and set Australia a target of only 151 in the fourth innings. Australia reached 105 for 4 before Botham took five for 11, including a spell of five wickets for a solitary run, to end Australia's second innings at 121 and give England victory by 29 runs.

England also went on to win the fifth Test at Old Trafford to retain the Ashes, including another century for Botham (who reached his hundred in 86 balls). Botham scored 118 from 102 balls, dominating a chalk-and-cheese partnership of 149 with Chris Tavaré, who blocked his way to 78 from 289 balls. Botham's innings included six sixes, which was an Ashes record until Ben Stokes's innings of 135 at Headingley in the 2019 Ashes series. Second-innings centuries from Allan Border and Graham Yallop could not avert defeat.

The sixth Test at The Oval was drawn, with Dennis Lillee taking 11 wickets in the match and Botham taking 10.

=== First Test ===
18–21 June 1981
Scorecard

England	v	Australia
185 (56.4 overs); MW Gatting 52 (117); TM Alderman 4/68 (24 overs)		179 (86.5 overs); AR Border 63 (204); GR Dilley 3/38 (20 overs)
125 (38.4 overs); IT Botham 33 (38); DK Lillee 5/46 (16.4 overs)		132/6 (54.1 overs); J Dyson 38 (89); GR Dilley 4/24 (11.1 overs)

Australia won by 4 wickets
Trent Bridge, Nottingham
Umpires: WE Alley and DJ Constant
Player of the match: DK Lillee (Aus)

- Australia won the toss and elected to field.
- TM Alderman and TM Chappell (Aus) made their Test debuts.
- It was Australia's first win at Trent Bridge since 1948.
- This Test match holds the record for the highest aggregate (621) without a 50 run partnership.

=== Second Test ===
2–7 July 1981
Scorecard

England	v	Australia
311 (124.1 overs); P Willey 82 (181); GF Lawson 7/81 (43.1 overs)		345 (118.4 overs); AR Border 64 (164); RGD Willis 3/50 (27.4 overs)
265/8d (98.4 overs); DI Gower 89 (207); RJ Bright 3/67 (36 overs)		90/4 (48.5 overs); GM Wood 62* (131); GR Dilley 2/18 (7.5 overs)

Match drawn
Lord's, London
Umpires: DO Oslear and KE Palmer
Player of the match: GF Lawson (Aus)

- Australia won the toss and elected to field.
- 5 July was taken as a rest day.
- RA Woolmer (Eng) retired hurt on 13* from 83/2 to 284/5 in England's first innings.

=== Third Test ===
16–21 July 1981
Scorecard

Australia	v	England
401/9d (155.2 overs); J Dyson 102 (234); IT Botham 6/95 (39.2 overs)		174 (50.5 overs); IT Botham 50 (54); DK Lillee 4/49 (18.5 overs)
111 (36.1 overs); J Dyson 34 (83); RGD Willis 8/43 (15.1 overs)		356 (f/o) (87.3 overs); IT Botham 149* (148); TM Alderman 6/135 (35.3 overs)

England won by 18 runs
Headingley, Leeds
Umpires: DO Oslear and KE Palmer
Player of the match: IT Botham (Eng)

- Australia won the toss and elected to bat.
- 19 July was taken as a rest day
- This was only the second time in Test history that a side won after following on.

=== Fourth Test ===
30 July – 2 August 1981
Scorecard

England	v	Australia
189 (69.1 overs); JM Brearley 48 (109); TM Alderman 5/42 (23.1 overs)		258 (86.5 overs); KJ Hughes 47 (101); JE Emburey 4/43 (26.5 overs)
219 (92 overs); MW Gatting 39 (71); RJ Bright 5/68 (34 overs)		121 (67 overs); AR Border 40 (175); IT Botham 5/11 (14 overs)

England won by 29 runs
Edgbaston, Birmingham
Umpires: HD Bird and DO Oslear
Player of the match: IT Botham (Eng)

- England won the toss and elected to bat.
- MF Kent (Aus) made his Test debut.
- IT Botham (Eng) took 5 wickets for 1 run in 28 balls during Australia's 2nd innings.
- This Test holds the record for the highest aggregate (787) without a player scoring a 50.

=== Fifth Test ===
13–17 August 1981
Scorecard

England	v	Australia
231 (86.1 overs); CJ Tavaré 69 (193); DK Lillee 4/55 (24.1 overs)		130 (30.2 overs); MF Kent 52 (45); RGD Willis 4/63 (14 overs)
404 (151.4 overs); IT Botham 118 (102); TM Alderman 5/109 (52 overs)		402 (135.5 overs); AR Border 123* (356); RGD Willis 3/96 (30.5 overs)

England won by 103 runs
Old Trafford, Manchester
Umpires: DJ Constant and KE Palmer
Player of the match: IT Botham (Eng)

- England won the toss and elected to bat.
- MR Whitney (Aus) and PJW Allott (England) made their Test debuts.

=== Sixth Test ===
27 August – 1 September 1981
Scorecard

Australia	v	England
352 (132 overs); AR Border 106* (230); IT Botham 6/125 (47 overs)		314 (110.4 overs); G Boycott 137 (321); DK Lillee 7/89 (31.4 overs)
344/9d (104.2 overs); DM Wellham 103 (221); M Hendrick 4/82 (29.2 overs)		261/7 (95 overs); APE Knott 70* (138); DK Lillee 4/70 (30 overs)

Match drawn
The Oval, London
Umpires: HD Bird and BJ Meyer
Player of the match: DK Lillee (Aus)

- England won the toss and elected to field.
- 30 August was taken as a rest day.
- DM Wellham (Aus) and PWG Parker (Eng) made their Test debuts.

== One Day Internationals (ODIs) ==
Three ODIs were played on this tour prior to the Test series. Australia won the Prudential Trophy 2–1, winning at Edgbaston and Headingley, after losing the first match at Lord's.

=== 1st ODI ===
4 June 1981
Scorecard

Australia; 210/7 (55 overs)	v	England; 212/4 (51.4 overs)
AR Border 73* (115); IT Botham 2/39 (11 overs)		G Boycott 75* (135); DK Lillee 2/23 (11 overs)

England won by 6 wickets
Lord's, London
Umpires: WE Alley and HD Bird
Player of the match: G Boycott (ENG)

- England won the toss and elected to field.
- GW Humpage and JD Love (both ENG) made their ODI debuts.

=== 2nd ODI ===
6 June 1981
Scorecard

Australia; 249/8 (55 overs)	v	England; 247 (54.5 overs)
GM Yallop 63 (132); IT Botham 2/44 (11 overs)		MW Gatting 96 (131); DK Lillee 3/36 (10.5 overs)

Australia won by 2 runs
Edgbaston, Birmingham
Umpires: DJ Constant and AGT Whitehead
Player of the match: MW Gatting (ENG)

- England won the toss and elected to field.
- TM Alderman (AUS) made his ODI debut.

=== 3rd ODI ===
8 June 1981
Scorecard

Australia; 236/8 (55 overs)	v	England; 165 (46.5 overs)
GM Wood 108 (150); RGD Willis 2/35 (11 overs)		P Willey 42 (66); RM Hogg 4/29 (8.5 overs)

Australia won by 71 runs
Headingley, Leeds
Umpires: BJ Meyer and KE Palmer
Player of the match: GM Wood (AUS)

- England won the toss and elected to field.

== Visit to Sri Lanka ==
The Australian team visited Sri Lanka in May 1981 en route to England. They played three limited-overs matches and one first-class match against the Sri Lanka national team, which at that time was on the brink of achieving Test status. The first-class match was played at Paikiasothy Saravanamuttu Stadium in Colombo and ended in a draw after being badly affected by the weather.
