= Jim Higgs =

Australian cricketer

Personal information
- Full name: James Donald Higgs
- Born: 11 July 1950 (age 76); Kyabram, Victoria
- Batting: Right-handed
- Bowling: Legbreak, googly

International information
- National side: Australia
- Test debut (cap 295): 3 March 1978 v West Indies
- Last Test: 7 February 1981 v India

Career statistics
| Competition | Test | First-class |
|---|---|---|
| Matches | 22 | 122 |
| Runs scored | 111 | 384 |
| Batting average | 5.54 | 5.40 |
| 100s/50s | 0/0 | 0/0 |
| Top score | 16 | 21 |
| Balls bowled | 4752 | 24,837 |
| Wickets | 66 | 399 |
| Bowling average | 31.16 | 29.66 |
| 5 wickets in innings | 2 | 19 |
| 10 wickets in match | 0 | 3 |
| Best bowling | 7/143 | 8/66 |
| Catches/stumpings | 3/– | 43/– |
- Source: Cricinfo, 2 March 2020

James Donald Higgs OAM (born 11 July 1950) is a former Australian leg spinner who played in 22 Test matches between 1978 and 1981. In the words of Gideon Haigh "Jim Higgs was Australia's best legspinner between Richie Benaud and Warne. His misfortune was to play at a time when wrist-spin was nearly extinct, thought to be the preserve only of the eccentric and the profligate, and so to find selectors and captains with little empathy with his guiles."

== Career ==
Higgs began his district cricket career at Melbourne University, where he studied civil engineering. He took 132 district wickets before transferring to Richmond in 1972.

=== First Class career ===
He made his debut for Victoria against Western Australia in 1970–71, taking four wickets. His best performances that summer was taking five wickets against South Australia. He had to take some time off from cricket in November due to exams, thus missing games against the touring English XI.

During the 1971–72 season, Higgs took his first five wicket haul at first class level with 5–162 against South Australia. He picked up eight wickets against West Australia and four against South Australia.

At the start of the 1972–73 season there was some talk Higgs might be a possibility for a spot in the squad to tour the West Indies at the end of the summer. However his form was less impressive, apart from six wickets against South Australia, and he was dropped from the Victorian side and replaced by Ray Bright.

Higgs started the following summer strongly with seven wickets against Queensland but was never as successful again – indeed he was made 12th man for some games. However, in a Richmond versus Northcote game he took 8 for 19.

1974–75 was Higgs' breakthrough season. He took 8–66 and 3–52 against Western Australia, 3–107 against the touring English, five against Queensland, eight against NSW and six against South Australia. He finished the summer with 42 wickets at an average of 21.92 and was subsequently selected for the Ashes tour in 1975 to England.

=== 1975 Ashes Tour ===
Ashley Mallett was Australian spinner at the time so Higgs did not play a Test on tour, but gained fame by not scoring a run for the whole tour. He batted twice and was bowled by the only ball he faced (against Leicestershire), which appealed to his humorous character.

Higgs' first class highlights included four wickets against Kent, six against the MCC and seven against Somerset. He took 27 wickets at an average of 32 with a first class batting average of 0. He injured his finger during the tour but played on regardless.

Higgs, along with Richie Robinson, did not take part in the reduced 14-man squad that participated in the 1975 World Cup.

Higgs did not enjoy as bountiful a time in 1975–76 apart from 4–86 against South Australia. Terry Jenner was picked ahead of him in the test team.

In the 1976–77 season, Higgs took 4–90 against South Australia and 5–90 in the district cricket final, helping secure Richmond a premiership, breaking a 30-year drought. However, by this stage Kerry O'Keeffe was Australia's preferred leg spinner and Ray Bright was the favoured second spinner. Ian Chappell wrote in a 1977 article that Higgs, along with fellow spinner David Hourn, "In my opinion neither of them are real cricketers. By that I mean they are only bowlers, not cricketers. They are both well below standard as fieldsmen and batsmen."

=== 1977–78 World Series Cricket ===
With the introduction of World Series Cricket, vacancies arose in the Australian team, especially for the spin bowling spot, as Kerry O'Keefe, Ashley Mallett and Ray Bright were all banned and no longer considered available for selection. Higgs took 6–131 against the touring Indians, which put him in the frame for the Australian side however Tony Mann was selected instead. Mann kept his place for the first four tests before being replaced by Bruce Yardley in the fifth. Both were better batsmen than Higgs, whose next best performance that summer was five wickets against West Australia. However Higgs was picked on the tour to the West Indies as the second spinner apart from Yardley.

=== 1977–78: Tour of West Indies and Test Debut ===
Higgs started the West Indies tour spectacularly well, taking 6–91 and 6–71 against the Leeward Islands.

This earned him selection in the first test as part of a spin duo with Bruce Yardley; Higgs took 4–91, the best performing Australian, but Australia lost the test by an innings. He took 1–46 and 1–34 in the second test and did not play the third. In the fourth, Higgs' four wickets helped put Australia in a winning position but a second innings batting collapse saw them lose.

Playing Jamaica, Higgs got 5–73 and 4–43. In the final test Higgs took five wickets – 2–47 and 3–67; he and Yardley were on the verge of bowling Australia to victory when the crowd rioted and the game was called off. Higgs took 42 first class wickets at an average of 22 on the tour.

=== 1978–79 Ashes ===
Higgs had come back form the West Indies with his reputation considerably enhanced. He took 3–82 against the touring Englishmen, and 4–72 against Western Australia

Higgs and Yardley were kept as Australia's spinners for the first test against England, but could not prevent a comfortable English victory; Higgs' returns were 0–9 and 0–43. Higgs was not picked in the second test but took 4–86 against NSW then 6–85 in another match against the same team.

Higgs came back to the Australian side for the third test, where his three wickets contributed to a rare Australian win.

Higgs' best performance of the summer came in the fourth test, where he took eight wickets including 5–148 in England's second innings, meaning Australia only had to score 205 to win. However they collapsed and Australia lost.

Higgs took three wickets in the fifth test and five in the sixth (4–69 and 1–12) both Australian defeats. He was dropped from the Australian side for the second test against Pakistan, replaced by Bruce Yardley.

Higgs rounded out the summer with 5–35 and 2–23 against Tasmania. Victoria won the Sheffield Shield that season, Higgs' 51 first class wickets playing no small part.

=== 1979 Tour of India ===
Higgs was picked on the 1979 tour of India, along with Yardley and Peter Sleep. Five wickets against South Zone got his tour off to a strong start. Higgs took 7–143 in the first test (a draw).

The rest of the series was harder going; for the second he got 1–95 and took no wickets in the third. 3–63 and 3–22 against the West Zone restored his confidence but he went for 3–150 in the fourth test (bowling in tandem with Peter Sleep) 1–107 in the fifth, and 2–116 in the sixth.

=== 1979–80 ===
From the 1979–80 season onwards, the World Series Cricket players were eligible for selection in the Australian team again.

Higgs started the 1979–80 season well with 5–50 and 7–49 against West Australia and 4–79 and 4–78 against NSW. This saw him recalled to the Australian team in the second test against the West Indies, replacing Jeff Thomson. Higgs went for an expensive 3–122 in an Australian loss. He was kept on in the side to play England, but only bowled one over.

The good form continued at domestic level, with 4–90 against Qld, 4–18 against Tasmania and 6–57 against South Australia. These returns helped Victoria win another Sheffield Shield and Higgs' seasonal record was 41 wickets at an average of 20.

Higgs was selected in the initial squad to tour Pakistan in 1980 but did not actually tour. This meant he could be available to play the end of the Shield. He also announced his unavailability for the 1980 tour of England.

=== 1980–81 ===
Higgs started the 1980–81 season more slowly, although he did take three wickets for Victoria against the touring New Zealanders. 2–65 and 4–67 against WA saw him picked in the Australian side to face New Zealand for the first test.

His first innings effort 4–59 against New Zealand helped Australia win the game and a return of 4–25 in the second innings helped them win the second.

Higgs picked up 3 wickets in the third test – a game probably best remembered for an incident when Higgs was batting. He was 1 not out and Australia 9–279 with Doug Walters on 77 when Lance Cairns bowled a bouncer; Higgs hit it to the wicketkeeper but umpire Robin Baillache ruled the delivery an illegal one as it was too intimidatory. Higgs went on to score 6 off 69 balls, Walters hit a century, Australia made 321 and ended up winning the game.

Against India, a second innings haul of 4–25 helped bowl Australia to victory in the first test though he took no wickets in the third (0–65 and 0–41), which Australia lost. This was Higgs' last test.

In February 1981 Ian Chappell said he would not pick Higgs for the English tour even though he felt Higgs was "the most productive spinner in Australia. English wickets are no help to leggies and Jim really struggled on the 1975 tour."

=== Later career ===
Higgs was appointed captain of Richmond in 1981–82. He never made the Australian team again but took six wickets against Tasmania in a Shield game, seven wickets against WA. and 5–68 against WA

His last first class game was in 1982–83 against Queensland; Higgs' figures were 0–90 and 2–24. He led Richmond to a premiership in 1982–83.

Higgs retired at the end of the 1982–83 season because of persistent back problems.

=== Selector ===
He was a Victorian selector from 1982–83 to 1988–89 and was appointed an Australian selector in 1985–86.

He was also president of Richmond from 1994 to 1997 and served on the Board of Cricket Victoria.
