= Graeme Beard =

Australian cricketer

Personal information
- Full name: Graeme Robert Beard
- Born: 19 August 1950 (age 76); Auburn, Sydney, Australia
- Batting: Right-handed
- Bowling: Right-arm medium Right-arm off-break
- Role: All-rounder

International information
- National side: Australia
- Test debut (cap 308): 27 February 1980 v Pakistan
- Last Test: 18 March 1980 v Pakistan
- ODI debut (cap 65): 31 January 1981 v New Zealand
- Last ODI: 1 February 1981 v New Zealand

Domestic team information
- Years: Team
- 1975/76–1981/82: New South Wales

Career statistics
Competition	Test	ODI	FC	LA
Matches	3	2	54	19
Runs scored	114	–	1,441	61
Batting average	22.80	–	23.62	10.16
100s/50s	0/0	–	0/11	0/0
Top score	49	–	75	23
Balls bowled	259	112	10,321	888
Wickets	1	4	125	25
Bowling average	109.00	17.50	28.19	25.96
5 wickets in innings	0	0	7	0
10 wickets in match	0	0	1	0
Best bowling	1/26	2/20	5/33	3/33
Catches/stumpings	0/–	0/–	22/–	7/–
- Source: Cricinfo, 20 January 2015

Graeme Robert Beard (born 19 August 1950) is a former Australian cricketer who played in three Test matches and two One Day Internationals in 1980 and 1981.

== Biography ==
Beard was born in the Sydney suburb of Auburn. He made his debut for New South Wales in 1975 against the touring West Indies cricket team, playing as a batsman and scoring 0 and 0. Later that summer he scored 75 against Victoria but he was dropped from the state side on the return of test players.

Beard played one first class game in 1977-78 but became a regular in the New South Wales side in the 1978–79 season as an all-rounder, bowling off- spin and medium pace. He even began to be discussed as a test player. He took five wickets in a game against Western Australia, 5–47 against Queensland, then eight wickets against Tasmania. His end of season Shield figures were 26 wickets at 26.00.

Beard was overlooked for NSW side at the beginning of 1979–80 as WSC players returned. However he soon became a state regular again. Against South Australia, he took six wickets and made 68; he also took 5–33 against Queensland. Beard took 20 Shield wickets at 20.25. He was chosen in the 1979-80 Australian tour of Pakistan, replacing Ashley Mallett who was injured. (Jim Higgs was unavailable to tour.) "I'd never even thought about being selected in an Australian side", said Beard. "I only ever concentrated on keeping my place in the NSW side and I thought this season I'd possibly cemented a spot for a little while. I was happy with being able to do that, so this has been a real bonus as far as I'm concerned".

=== International cricketer ===
Beard scored 64 in the opening tour game. He played in all three Test matches of that tour, playing a few dogged innings (39 and 49 in the 3rd Test at Lahore) and took one wicket (1 for 26 in the 3rd Test). (The only Australian bowler to do well on that tour was Ray Bright.)

During the 1980–81 season, Beard scored a pair of fifties in a Shield game. Bill O'Reilly suggested that Beard be chosen to replace Shaun Graf as 12th man in the test team with a view to blooding him for the 1981 English tour. However Trevor Chappell was selected instead.

In 1980-81 Beard took ten wickets for New South Wales in a game against New Zealand. This led to him being named in the Australian one day side during the finals of the World Series Cup competition, replacing Shaun Graf. Beard was omitted for the first game but played in the second versus New Zealand, taking two wickets. In the third final (Beard's second match) he took two tickets but this was overshadowed by the infamous underarm bowling incident.

Beard took 29 first class wickets at 25.24. Although he took less wickets than Bruce Yardley, Jim Higgs and Bob Holland, Beard was selected as a spinner on the Ashes tour 1981. New Zealand captain Geoff Howard warned "He'll have to be extremely accurate or he'll get punished. Graeme is only a gentle medium pace and the slow wickets over there leave no margin for error".

Ian Chappell had suggested that Beard be selected on the tour if Ashley Mallett was unavailable calling Beard "a seamer-cum-spinner and... a more than useful middle order batsman" (he preferred Beard over Jim Higgs who Chappell felt would not do well in England). Brian Mossop of the Sydney Morning Herald wrote, "my tip is that while he may have been chosen to do much of the county hackwork, he will make the test team in England."

Beard did not play in either the Tests or One Day Internationals on the tour. He did play a tour game against Sri Lanka taking 5-69, but Sri Lanka taking 5-69. He took 4–92 against Essex. Injuries to various bowlers saw Beard's selection floated as a possibility around the time of the fourth test but he was never picked in an international game.

Beard put in some strong domestic performances in 1981-82 including a first class highest score of 75. However at the end of the season he retired from first-class cricket, and left his job as a teacher to work for the Australian Workers' Union.
