= Glenn Hughes (cricketer) =

Australian cricketer (born 1959)

Personal information
- Full name: Glenn Arthur Hughes
- Born: 23 November 1959 (age 66); Goomalling, Western Australia
- Batting: Right-handed
- Bowling: Right-arm off break
- Relatives: Kim Hughes (brother)

Domestic team information
- Years: Team
- 1986/87–1991/92: Tasmania
- 1989/80: Orange Free State

Career statistics
| Competition | FC | LA |
|---|---|---|
| Matches | 44 | 17 |
| Runs scored | 2,571 | 399 |
| Batting average | 35.21 | 23.47 |
| 100s/50s | 3/16 | 0/2 |
| Top score | 147 | 98 |
| Balls bowled | 2,603 | 198 |
| Wickets | 16 | 2 |
| Bowling average | 79.37 | 79.00 |
| 5 wickets in innings | 0 | 0 |
| 10 wickets in match | 0 | 0 |
| Best bowling | 2/20 | 1/33 |
| Catches/stumpings | 17/– | 3/– |
- Source: Cricinfo, 2 January 2011

Glenn Arthur Hughes (born 23 November 1959) is a former Australian cricketer, who played first-class cricket for Tasmania and Orange Free State.

== Career ==
Hughes is the younger brother of former Australian cricket captain Kim Hughes. Hughes played from 1986 until 1992 for the Orange Free State and Tasmania. He initially moved to Tasmania from home-city of Perth after finding it difficult to break into the Western Australia cricket team, and played in South Africa between 1989 and 1991 as the South African ban was lifted. He was an accomplished right-handed batsman and "solid opener" who scored over 2000 runs in his first-class career.

Following retirement, Hughes became a broadcaster at the Bellerive Oval for ABC Radio Grandstand and a state selector for Tasmania. He also ran his own coaching centre, the Glenn Hughes Cricket Coaching Centre.

=== 2010 rape accusation ===
In late 2010 Hughes faced allegations of rape by a former lover. He pleaded not guilty to two counts of sexual penetration without consent. Following payment of a $20,000 bail notice, Hughes was released to home detention for the duration of the trial. He lost both his position as state selector for Tasmania and broadcaster for ABC Grandstand. He was subsequently found not guilty of all charges.
