= Geoff Lawson (cricketer) =

Australian cricketer

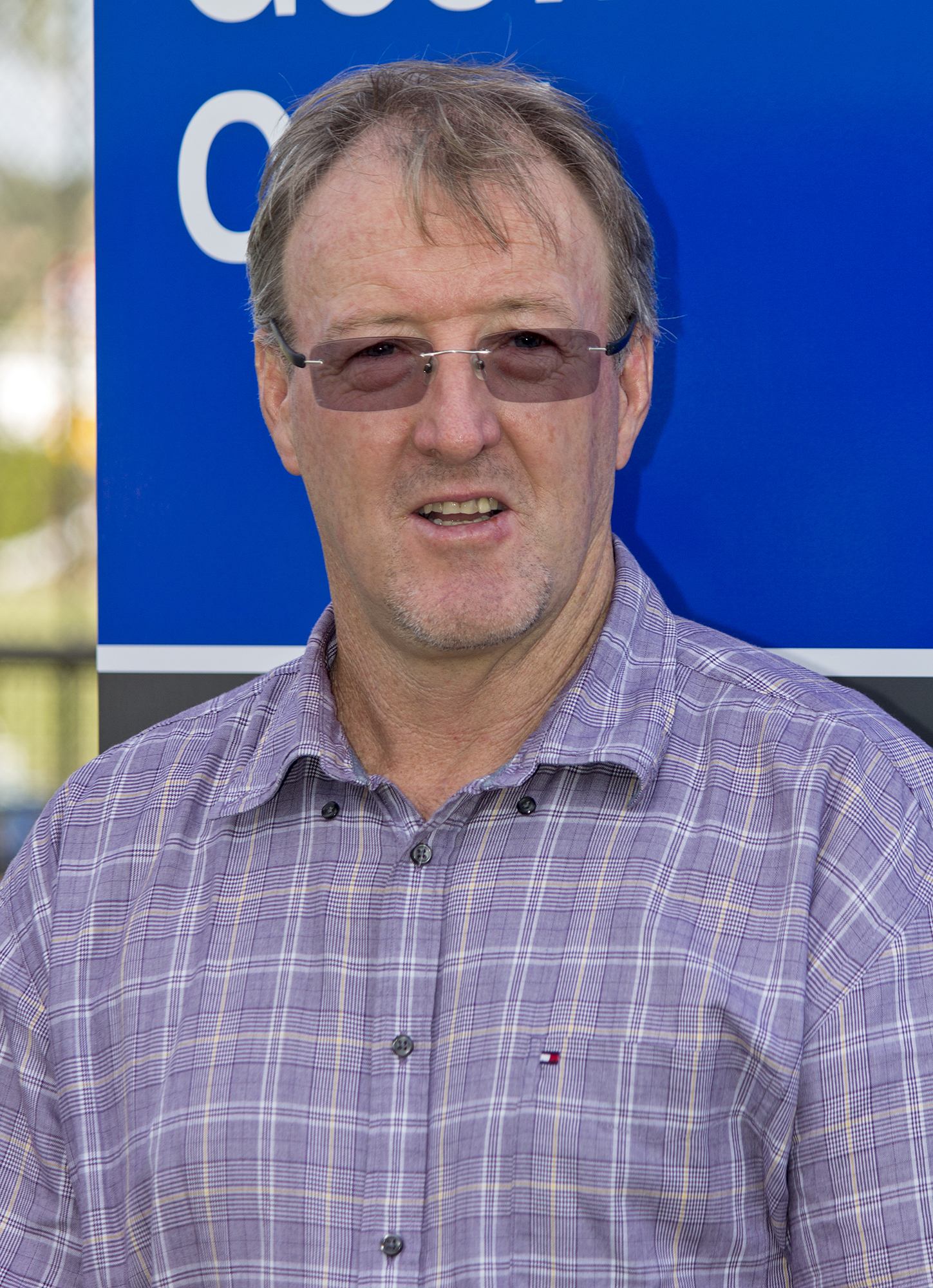
- Lawson in 2014

Personal information
- Full name: Geoffrey Francis Lawson
- Born: 7 December 1957 (age 68); Wagga Wagga, New South Wales, Australia
- Nickname: Henry
- Height: 187 cm (6 ft 2 in)
- Batting: Right-handed
- Bowling: Right-arm fast
- Role: Bowler

International information
- National side: Australia
- Test debut (cap 309): 28 November 1980 v New Zealand
- Last Test: 8 December 1989 v Sri Lanka
- ODI debut (cap 63): 23 November 1980 v New Zealand
- Last ODI: 27 October 1989 v India

Domestic team information
- Years: Team
- 1977/78–1991/92: New South Wales
- 1979: Lancashire

Career statistics
Competition	Test	ODI
Matches	46	79
Runs scored	894	378
Batting average	15.96	11.11
100s/50s	0/4	0/0
Top score	74	33*
Balls bowled	11,118	4259
Wickets	180	88
Bowling average	30.56	29.45
5 wickets in innings	11	0
10 wickets in match	2	0
Best bowling	8/112	4/26
Catches/stumpings	10/–	18/–
- Source: ESPNcricinfo, 12 December 2005

Geoffrey Francis Lawson, OAM (born 7 December 1957) is an Australian cricket coach and former cricketer and the former coach of the Pakistan cricket team.

Nicknamed "Henry" after the Australian poet, Lawson was a fast bowler for New South Wales (NSW) and Australia. He first played for NSW in 1977–78, made his international debut in 1980–81. Lawson made three tours of England, including the 1989 Ashes-winning tour.

For a few seasons in the early 1980s, Lawson was Australia's leading fast bowler, but his career suffered from poor luck with injury.

Lawson received the Order of Australia in 1990 for services to cricket and in 2002 he was given the Australian Sports Medal. He is a qualified optometrist who graduated with a Bachelor of Optometry (BOptom) from the University of New South Wales.

Since his playing retirement, Lawson has been a coach, commentator and writer on the game. He has broadcast for ABC Radio, Channel Nine and Foxsports, and contributed to The Sydney Morning Herald and other newspapers and magazines in various countries. He has coached the Kochi Tuskers Kerala.

== International career ==
Lawson first came to notice in international cricket by bowling a series of bouncers during a brief spell against Geoff Boycott in a tour match between NSW and England in the 1978–79 season. He was called up as a replacement player for the 1979 tour of India, but did not play a Test match. Similarly, he toured Pakistan in 1980 and did not make the Test team.

He took three wickets during his debut in the first Test against New Zealand at Brisbane in 1980–81, and played the first three ODIs of his career in the World Series Cup. In only his third Test, Lawson returned 7/81 in the first innings against England at Lord's in 1981, which earned him the man of the match award. However, injuries interrupted his progress. He missed the last three Tests of the series with a back injury and played only one Test in the following Australian season, against the West Indies at Melbourne. Chosen for nine preliminary ODIs in the World Series Cup, his total of nine wickets was not enough to earn him selection for the finals against the West Indies.

Establishing himself as a leading bowler on Australia's tour of Pakistan in 1982, Lawson claimed nine wickets at 33.55 in three Tests on slow wickets not conducive to fast bowling. He then won the 'Player of the Series' award for his efforts in the 1982–83 Ashes series. In the absence of the injured Dennis Lillee, he became the spearhead of the Australian attack, taking 34 wickets at 20.20 average. This included 5/108 in the second innings at Perth during the first Test (where he scored 50 in the first innings), match figures of 11/134 at Brisbane, and 4/46 and 5/66 at Adelaide. Australia won the series 2–1 and regained the Ashes. Lawson enjoyed a successful World Series Cup tournament, capturing 16 wickets at 15.80 in ten ODIs as Australia defeated New Zealand in the final.

Opting to miss the short tour of Sri Lanka that followed, Lawson returned to the team for the 1983 World Cup. The Australians failed to make the semi-final in a disappointing performance and Lawson's contribution was five wickets in four games. Against Pakistan in 1983–84, he was again Australia's most successful Test bowler in a 2–0 win, taking 24 wickets at 24.16, including 5/59 and 4/48 in the fifth Test at Sydney.

Lawson had a mediocre 1984 tour of the West Indies, taking only 12 wickets in five Tests; although he performed better on the short one day tour of India later that year. Playing against the West Indies in the Australian season of 1984–85, Lawson returned to form with 23 wickets at 25.60. In the third Test at Adelaide, he claimed 8/112 in a marathon spell on a batting-friendly pitch, then made 49 in the first innings but Australia lost the match, and eventually the series 1–3. During the season, he played 15 ODIs and took 17 wickets, but surprisingly was never chosen for an ODI in Australia again.

Leading an inexperienced bowling attack weakened by player defections to the rebel tours of South Africa, Lawson captured 24 wickets in six Tests against England in 1985 despite suffering bronchial problems throughout the tour. His best was 5/103 in the first innings at Nottingham and a score of 53 in the fifth Test at Edgbaston. However, his wickets were obtained at the expensive average of 37.72, as England compiled a series of high scores and won the series 3–1. The weakened Australian team fared little better in the 1985–86 season, playing New Zealand and India. Injury restricted Lawson to only two Tests against the Kiwis, for five wickets.

As Australia began rebuilding its team, Lawson was absent for most of the next three years, due to injuries and falling out of favour with the selectors and the captain Allan Border. He played a single Test in both the 1986–87 Ashes series and the 1988–89 series against the West Indies. In the latter match, he took three wickets, but had his jaw broken by a bouncer from Curtly Ambrose while batting. Lawson recovered to make the 1989 tour of England, when his experience and guile contributed to a resurgence in Australia's performances. Forming a potent pace bowling attack with Terry Alderman and Merv Hughes, Lawson finished with 29 wickets at 27.27 as Australia won back the Ashes with a crushing 4–0 victory. His best performance came in the fourth Test at Manchester, where he took 6/72 and 3/81 and was named man of the match. In the second Test at Lord's, Lawson hit a career-best 74 in the first innings in sharing a partnership of 130 with Steve Waugh.

It proved to be the Indian summer of his career. He played his last ODIs during the Nehru Cup tournament in India that followed the England tour. In the 1989–90 Australian season, he played one Test against New Zealand (for two wickets) and then took a solitary wicket in the first Test against Sri Lanka at Brisbane. Dropped for the next Test, he failed to regain his place although he continued playing for NSW until the end of the 1991–92 season.

== Domestic cricket career ==
In the Sheffield Shield competition, he captained New South Wales between 1988 and 1992, leading the team to the final in the 1991–92 season, his final first-class game. In all, he captured 395 wickets for NSW. His positive, aggressive captaincy influenced NSW colleagues and future Australian captains Mark Taylor and Steve Waugh. He had a brief playing stint for Lancashire in the English County Championship.

== Coaching career ==
Between 1995 and 1997, Lawson was coach of the NSW team. On 16 July 2007, he was appointed as coach of the Pakistan cricket team for two years, becoming the third foreigner to take on the role. On 20 October 2008, Pakistan Cricket Board chairman Ijaz Butt stated Lawson's contract would not be renewed once his term finishes in April 2009 stating "We have no utility for Lawson." He was subsequently sacked on 24 October 2008. He describes the time he lived as an Australian in Lahore as "enjoyable."
