= Terry Jenner =

Australian cricketer (1944–2011)

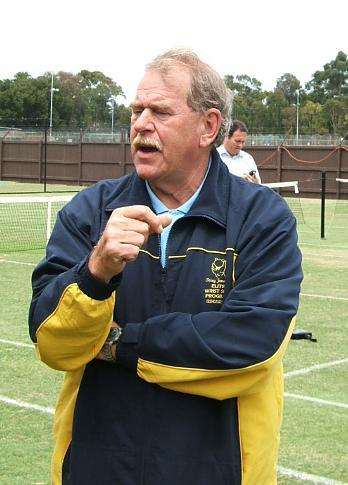

Personal information
- Full name: Terrence James Jenner
- Born: 8 September 1944; Mount Lawley, Western Australia
- Died: 25 May 2011 (aged 66); Adelaide, South Australia
- Batting: Right-handed
- Bowling: Leg break
- Role: Bowler

International information
- National side: Australia
- Test debut (cap 248): 27 November 1970 v England
- Last Test: 28 November 1975 v West Indies
- Only ODI (cap 27): 1 January 1975 v England

Domestic team information
- Years: Team
- 1963/64–1966/67: Western Australia
- 1967/68–1976/77: South Australia
- 1971–1972: Cambridgeshire

Career statistics
Competition	Test	ODI	FC	LA
Matches	9	1	131	14
Runs scored	208	12	3,580	156
Batting average	23.11	12.00	22.23	17.33
100s/50s	0/1	0/0	0/11	0/0
Top score	74	12	86	34
Balls bowled	1,881	64	26,802	752
Wickets	24	0	389	19
Bowling average	31.20	–	32.18	24.68
5 wickets in innings	1	–	14	0
10 wickets in match	0	–	1	0
Best bowling	5/90	–	7/84	4/54
Catches/stumpings	5/–	0/–	87/–	5/–
- Source: CricketArchive, 25 May 2011

Terrence James Jenner (8 September 1944 – 25 May 2011) was an Australian cricketer who played nine Tests and one ODI from 1970 to 1975. He was primarily a leg-spin bowler and was known for his attacking, loopy style of bowling, but he was also a handy lower-order batsman. In his latter years he was a leg-spin coach to many players around the world, and a great influence on Shane Warne. He was also a radio cricket commentator for the Australian Broadcasting Corporation.

== Playing career ==
=== Early cricket ===
Jenner was born in Mount Lawley, Western Australia. He was first selected as an all-rounder in grade cricket in Perth at the age of 17, playing for Mount Lawley. After two years in grade cricket, he was selected to make his debut for Western Australia, primarily as a bowling all-rounder in the 1963–64 season. However, as the WACA Ground was not conducive to spin, and with England left-arm orthodox spinner Tony Lock playing in the team, Jenner rarely appeared in the XI, claiming only 34 wickets in four seasons.

=== Move to South Australia ===
He moved to South Australia in 1967–68, playing at the more spin-friendly Adelaide Oval and became a regular member of the playing team. After three seasons there, he was selected for the 1970 tour to New Zealand, but did not play in the Test matches.

=== International cricket ===
He was finally able to make his debut in the 1970–71 Australian season in the First Test of the 1970–71 Ashes series at Brisbane. He did not however make a large impact, scoring 0 and 2 and taking 2/95, resulting in his immediate dismissal from the team. He was recalled for the Seventh, and final Test of the series at the spin-friendly Sydney Cricket Ground, where he took 3/42 as England were dismissed on the first day for 184. In the Australian innings he ducked into a short ball from John Snow. This resulted in crowd trouble which forced English captain Ray Illingworth to evacuate his players from the ground. Jenner returned to bat at 235–8 and made a brave 30, last man out on 264 – giving Australia a lead of 80 runs – and took 1/39 in the second innings, but Australia lost the test and The Ashes.

He was then dropped from international cricket for a season, before being selected to tour the West Indies in 1972–73, playing the last four matches in a five Test series. He claimed thirteen wickets at 26.7, including career best figures of 5/90 in the fifth Test at Port of Spain, Trinidad, as well as making 38 with the bat without dismissal in the same game. Despite this performance, he was again overlooked for the entirety of the following season, playing next against England in the 1974–75 Australian season, in which he was selected for two matches. He had little success with the ball, taking two wickets at 48.5, but showed some of all-round skill by scoring a Test best of 74 at the Adelaide Oval. A solitary Test the following year in Australia against the West Indies, in which he took 2/90, was his last.

Unable to hold down a regular position in the team, Jenner played a total of nine Tests in a four-year period. He only played Test cricket outside of Australia on one tour, against the West Indies. He played one ODI, in which he scored 12 and bowled economically without success, conceding 28 runs in 8 overs.

=== Final years ===
His first class career continued for a further two years until the end of the 1976–77 season, participating in a two-pronged South Australian attack with off-spinner Ashley Mallett. In total, his 131 first class matches yielded 389 wickets at an average of 32.2, including fourteen five wicket hauls and one ten wicket haul. He also regularly contributed with the bat, scoring ten half-centuries.

== Post-retirement ==
In 1988 Jenner was sentenced to six and a half years in prison after stealing funds from his employer in order to repay gambling debts. He was however released after 18 months.

He then became a spin-bowling coach at the Australian Cricket Academy in Adelaide. As a highly respected coach, he had a massive influence on the career of Shane Warne, and was a mentor to many other slow bowlers across the world.

== Death ==
In April 2010 Jenner suffered a massive heart attack, and died at home on 25 May 2011. His funeral took place at the Adelaide Oval on 30 May 2011.
