= Kerry O'Keeffe =

Australian cricketer and commentator

Personal information
- Full name: Kerry James O'Keeffe
- Born: 25 November 1949 (age 76); Hurstville, New South Wales, Australia
- Nickname: Skull
- Batting: Right-handed
- Bowling: Right-arm leg spin
- Role: All rounder

International information
- National side: Australia (1971–1977)
- Test debut (cap 253): 21 January 1971 v England
- Last Test: 28 July 1977 v England
- ODI debut (cap 34): 2 June 1977 v England
- Last ODI: 6 June 1977 v England

Domestic team information
- Years: Team
- 1968/69–1979/80: New South Wales
- 1971–1972: Somerset

Career statistics
Competition	Test	ODI	FC	LA
Matches	24	2	169	39
Runs scored	644	16	4,169	305
Batting average	25.76	16.00	26.05	15.25
100s/50s	0/1	0/0	0/13	0/0
Top score	85	16*	99*	35
Balls bowled	5384	132	31,052	1,431
Wickets	53	2	476	27
Bowling average	38.07	39.50	28.11	32.70
5 wickets in innings	1	0	24	0
10 wickets in match	0	0	5	0
Best bowling	5/101	1/36	7/38	3/16
Catches/stumpings	15/–	0/–	112/–	7/–
- Source: Cricinfo, 10 November 2012

Kerry James O'Keeffe (born 25 November 1949) is an Australian former cricketer and a current cricket commentator for Fox Sports. O'Keeffe played 24 Test matches and two One Day Internationals between 1971 and 1977. Due to his comedic anecdotes and unique mannerisms, he has emerged as a popular commentator among fans.

== Playing career ==
He was a spin bowler, bowling leg breaks. He never quite lived up to early expectations of being the next great Australian leg spin bowler, taking 53 wickets at an average of 38.07. He did, however, have some success with the bat, averaging 25.76 and being called upon to open the batting in the second innings of the Centenary Test. One statistic that O'Keeffe himself uses to demonstrate his lack of penetration with the ball is that he is the bowler with the highest percentage of wickets out 'caught' in the history of Test match cricket (44 out of 53 wickets, 84%). This is typical of his commentating style of making fun of his bowling abilities. He often talks of an incident during the 1977 Australian tour of England, when he appealed against a batsman for leg before wicket, and the umpire turned him down, saying that the ball was "doing too much" (meaning that the ball was spinning so much that it would have missed the stumps). O'Keeffe said that the umpire's comment was a sarcastic jibe at his inability to spin the ball, something he likes to mock himself about.

O'Keefe made his first class debut in 1968–69 at the age of 19. He had a successful summer the following season, taking 35 first class wickets at 29.85, leading to his selection on an Australia team to tour New Zealand where he took 22 wickets at 22.

O'Keefe's continued strong form saw him made his Test debut against England in the Fifth Test of the 1970–71 Ashes series after taking 6/69 and hitting 55 not out in the New South Wales match against the tourists. O'Keefe took 0–71.

Recalled for the vital Seventh Test on the spinning SCG pitch, to bowl in tandem with Terry Jenner, O'Keefe took 3/48 and 3/96, but it was not enough to win the game and save The Ashes.

In 1971 O'Keefe signed a three year deal with Somerset to play county cricket in England. He took 77 wickets in 1971 in England at 23.57.

O'Keefe played several games for Australia against the touring World XI in 1971–72. He did not bowl particularly well and was not selected on the 1972 tour of England. He played for Somerset but only took 19 wickets at 59.42.

O'Keefe was recalled to play for Australia against Pakistan in 1972–73. In the first Test he scored 40 and took one wicket, that of Zaheer Abbas. In the second Test he took two wickets. He was dropped for the third Test in favour of John Watkins.

O'Keefe was selected on the 1973 tour of the West Indies, the other spinners being Terry Jenner and John Watkins. He played all five Tests. In the third Test, O'Keefe made a crucial contribution to Australia's 44 run victory, scoring 37 and 7 (the amount Australia won by) and taking 2–62 and 4–57.

In 1973–74 O'Keefe took four wickets in Australia's first Test victory against New Zealand. In the third Test, he took six wickets and scored 85 in a comprehensive Australian victory. O'Keefe played in the three Tests in New Zealand that followed.

O'Keefe did not play for Australia again until 1976–77 when he was picked for all three Tests against Pakistan. He took six wickets in the first Test, and five in the second, helping bowl Australia to victory.

O'Keefe played in both Tests on the tour of New Zealand, taking six wickets in the first (including 5–101 in the first innings). He took 35 first class wickets on tour at 16.22.

In the Centenary Test O'Keefe opened the batting in the second innings in place of Rick McCosker, and his 3–108 (including the crucial wickets of Derek Randall and Tony Greig) helped bowl Australia to victory.

O'Keefe had a poor tour of England in 1977. He played in the first three Tests, but had little success and was dropped for the last two. His form in county games was strong, taking 36 first class wickets at 28.75 and scoring 355 first class runs at an average of 50.7 helped by 12 not outs.

O'Keefe was offered a contract to play World Series Cricket. However the selectors preferred Ray Bright as the first choice Australian spinner. O'Keefe toured the West Indies with the WSC Australian XI but was injured in a road accident.

O'Keefe only played two more first class games in 1979–80.

== Post-playing career ==
O'Keeffe has remained involved in cricket since his retirement, including as a commentator on ABC Radio. He is known for his humorous anecdotes, told in the manner of an after-dinner speech at a cricketers club, and his distinctive laugh. He often enjoys working with overseas commentators such as India's Harsha Bhogle, whom he enjoyed confusing with his colourful Australian language. However, when he concentrates on the game, he shows insight born of a career at the highest level together with study of the statistics and history of the game.

In 2004, he released his autobiography According to Skull. He has also released a number of CDs containing some shorts of his commentating antics.

On 27 December 2013, while providing commentary on the Melbourne Boxing Day Test between Australia and England, O'Keeffe announced his retirement from commentating after the Sydney Test in January 2014 (O'Keeffe had accepted a redundancy from the ABC). However, O'Keeffe returned to cricket commentary in December 2016 as part of Triple M's new cricket coverage.

O'Keeffe joined the Fox Sports cricket commentary team from the 2018–19 season, where he was still commentating in the 2025–26 season.
