= Kim Hughes =

Australian cricketer (born 1954)

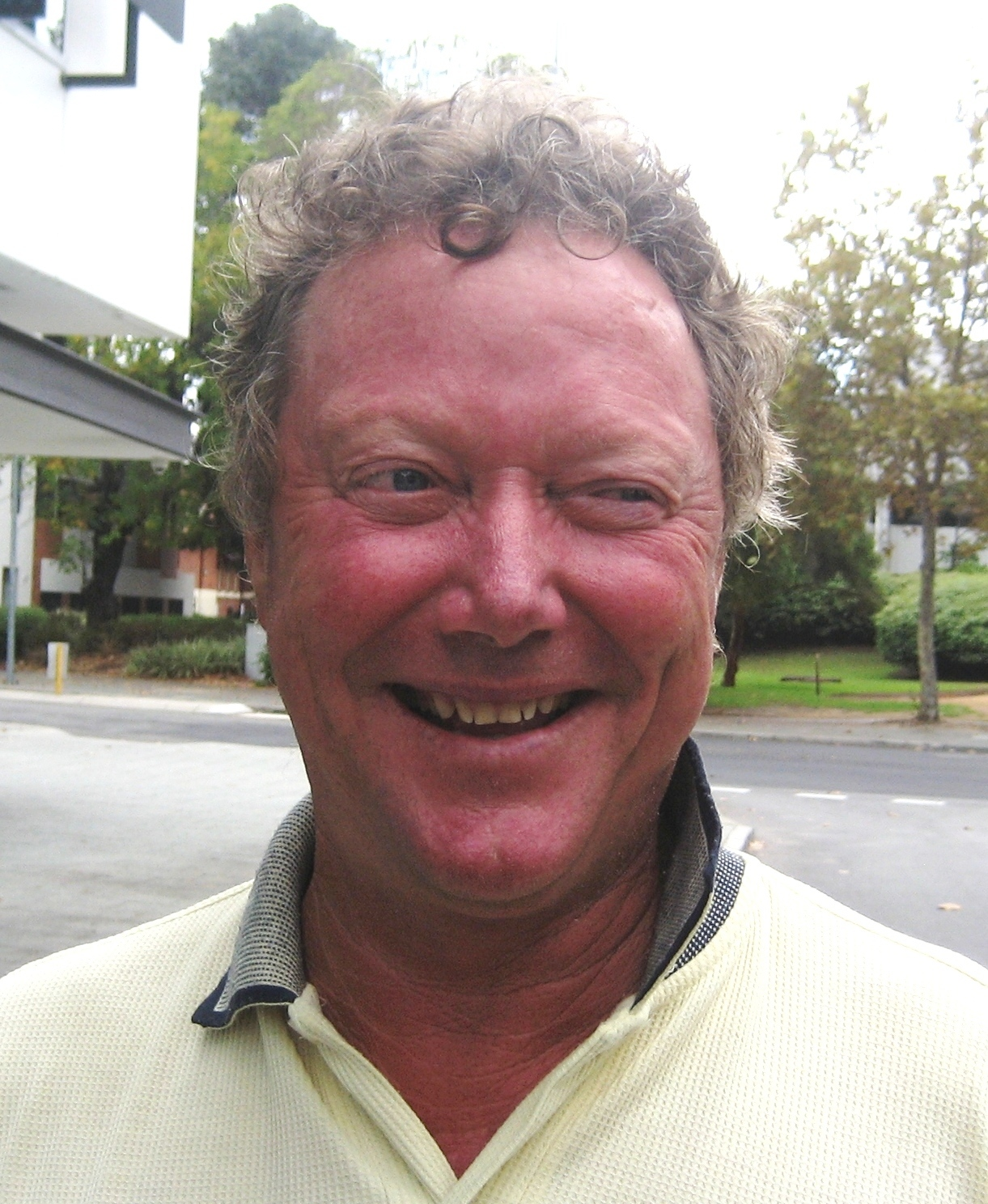
- Hughes in 2009

Personal information
- Full name: Kimberley John Hughes
- Born: 26 January 1954 (age 72); Margaret River, Western Australia
- Nickname: Claggy
- Height: 182 cm (6 ft 0 in)
- Batting: Right-handed
- Bowling: Right-arm medium
- Role: Top-order batsman
- Relatives: Glenn Hughes (brother)

International information
- National side: Australia (1977-1985)
- Test debut (cap 281): 25 August 1977 v England
- Last Test: 27 December 1984 v West Indies
- ODI debut (cap 37): 4 June 1977 v England
- Last ODI: 29 March 1985 v India

Domestic team information
- Years: Team
- 1975/76–1988/89: Western Australia
- 1989/90–1990/91: Natal

Career statistics
Competition	Test	ODI	FC	LA
Matches	70	97	216	179
Runs scored	4,415	1,968	12,711	3,961
Batting average	37.41	24.00	36.52	25.06
100s/50s	9/22	0/17	26/69	1/28
Top score	213	98	213	119
Balls bowled	85	1	194	80
Wickets	0	0	3	2
Bowling average	–	–	32.33	30.50
5 wickets in innings	–	–	0	0
10 wickets in match	–	–	0	0
Best bowling	–	–	1/0	2/38
Catches/stumpings	50/–	27/–	155/–	53/–
- Source: CricketArchive, 14 April 2008

Kimberley John Hughes (born 26 January 1954) is a former cricketer who played for Western Australia, Natal and Australia. He captained Australia in 28 Test matches between 1979 and 1984 before captaining a rebel Australian team in a tour of South Africa, a country which at the time was subject to a sporting boycott opposing apartheid.

A right-handed batsman, Hughes was seen to possess an orthodox and attractive batting style. He was identified as a potential Test cricketer from an early age, but his impetuous style of batting, and personality clashes with influential teammates and opponents such as Dennis Lillee and Rod Marsh, saw a later introduction to first-class and Test cricket than anticipated. During the split between the establishment Australian Cricket Board and the breakaway World Series Cricket, Hughes stayed with the establishment.

Hughes' captaincy record with Australia was hindered by a succession of matches being played away from home (just eight of his 28 Tests as captain were played in Australia) and the necessity to rebuild an inexperienced team after the frequent absence, and later the retirement, of several senior players. Placed under extreme pressure by the media and former teammates during a series of losses to the then dominant cricket team in the world, West Indies, Hughes resigned from the captaincy, making an emotional and tearful speech. He finished his career playing cricket in South Africa.

After his playing career, Hughes for a time acted as the chairman of selectors for the Western Australian Cricket Association, and is an occasional commentator for ABC Radio's cricket coverage.

== Early life ==
Hughes was born on 26 January 1954, at Margaret River, Western Australia, the first child of father Stan, a school teacher, and mother Ruth. The Hughes family lived in nearby Kudardup, where Stan was in charge of the one-teacher school. Stan's profession would take the Hughes family across much of the south-west of Western Australia, including postings at Ballidu, Pinjarra and Geraldton. The Hughes family settled in the Geraldton suburb of Wonthella and Hughes attended the local Allendale Primary School, where his father was the headmaster.

In Geraldton, the young Hughes played a variety of sports, including hockey, tennis and especially Australian rules football. His boyhood hero was Austin Robertson, Jr. who played for Subiaco Football Club, the club that Hughes' father had played for as a young man. His first organised cricket was as an 11-year old, filling in for the Bluff Point Cricket Club under-16 side. Aged 11, he was selected for a Geraldton under-16 representative side to compete in the junior "Country Week" tournament in the state capital of Perth, where his teammates included Geoff Gallop, later Premier of Western Australia. He was selected in the Geraldton Country Week team again the following year. It was at this tournament that Hughes' performances playing against much older boys saw him come to the attention of cricket administrators.

After Hughes finished primary school, the family moved to Perth. Hughes attended City Beach High School and played cricket for the Floreat Park (now Floreat) Under-16 side. In his final season at junior level Hughes scored 555 runs at an average of 46 and took 28 wickets at an average of 6, and was included in the Western Australia Colts squad. The next season, aged 15, Hughes made his first grade debut for Subiaco-Floreat Cricket Club, captained by former Test player Des Hoare; Hughes made 36 runs. In January 1970, Hughes was selected to play for Western Australia in the national under-19 carnival. His captain, Ric Charlesworth, later described Hughes as "the most gifted junior cricketer I ever saw. No one else comes close." Later that season Hughes made his first century in first grade cricket, against Midland-Guildford; he finished the season topping the club batting averages.

== Cricket career ==
=== Club cricket and first-class debut ===
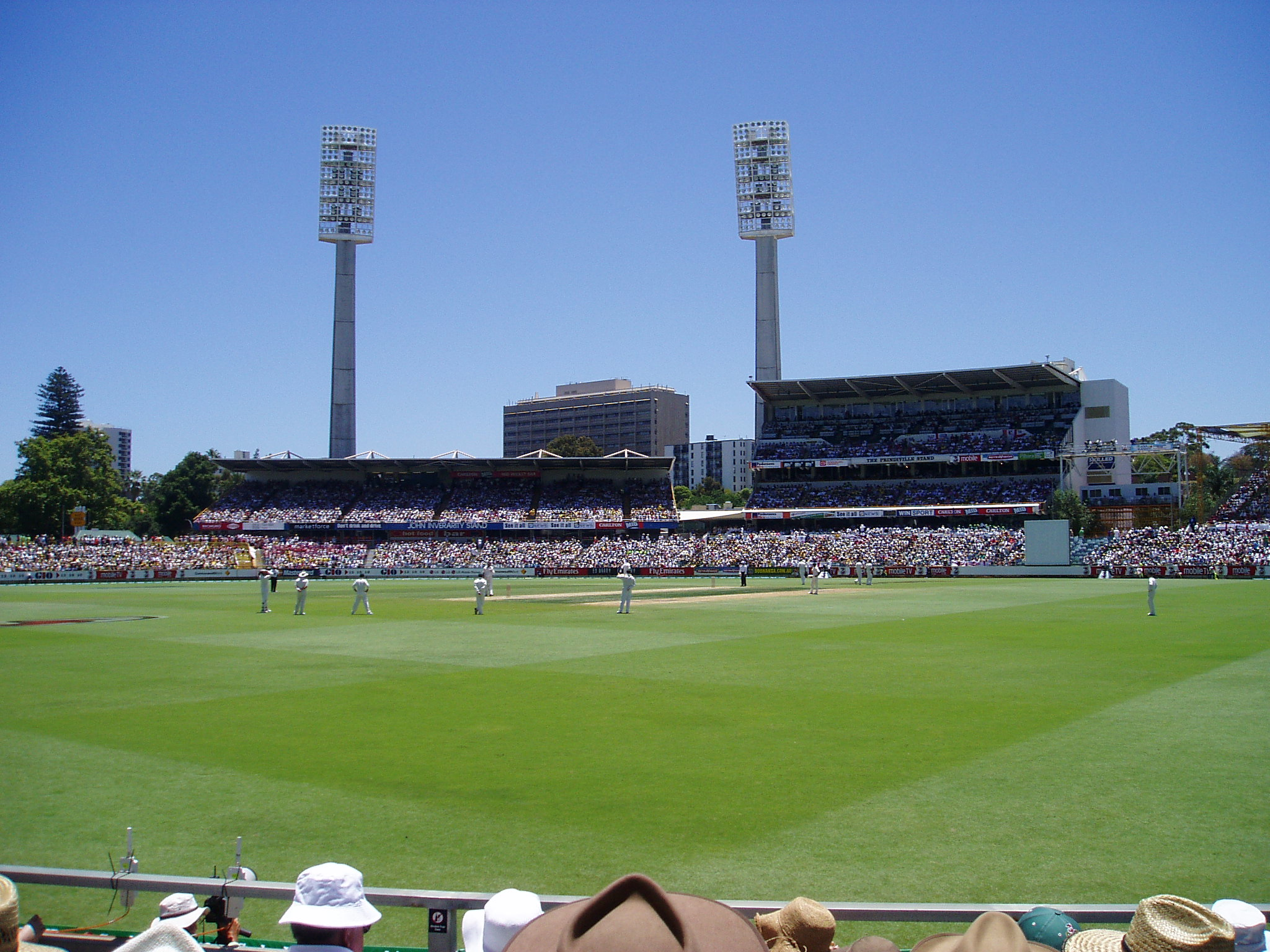
The WACA Ground, the home ground of the Western Australian cricket team and the venue for Hughes' first-class cricket debut.

After only nine first grade games, in 1970–71 Hughes was included in the Western Australian Sheffield Shield squad. Described at the time by Test wicket-keeper Rod Marsh as "a technically perfect batsman", the Perth press speculated he might even make his first-class cricket debut later that season. Instead, Hughes suffered from the "second-year blues" and struggled for runs, averaging only 23 for the season. He was unable to break out of the slump for the next two seasons, finding himself out of the state squad. During this time he managed to retain selection in the state colts team, in one match against the Victorian colts scoring a dashing 97 before being caught on the boundary attempting to reach his century with a six. It would be four years after his maiden first grade century that Hughes would make his second, against North Perth.

In 1973–74, Hughes was called up to the Western Australian squad. He acted as twelfth man in three successive matches, but was unable to break into the playing XI due to the strong Western Australian batting line-up. Impatient to play at first-class level, Hughes left for Adelaide mid-season to try his luck at gaining selection for South Australia, whose batting was not as strong. He played for East Torrens Cricket Club and awaited an invitation to play for South Australia; he was not even invited to train with the state squad. His South Australian experiment unsuccessful, Hughes—disappointed and homesick—returned to Western Australia.

Hughes was captain-coach of North Perth Cricket Club for the 1975–76 season. He finally broke into the Western Australian team in November 1975, making his first-class debut against New South Wales at the WACA Ground. In an innings described by New South Wales bowler Dave Hourn as the "best and most dynamic innings" he had seen in first-class cricket, Hughes continually stepped down the pitch to hit the bowling, even to the pace bowling of Len Pascoe. He was dismissed for 119, ending a partnership of 205 runs with Rob Langer. He was the fifth Western Australian batsman to make a century on first-class debut for the state. Later that season, Hughes scored a second century, against Clive Lloyd's touring West Indians. In his first season for Western Australia, Hughes made 494 runs at an average of 32.93.

In the winter of 1976, Hughes played as a professional for Watsonians Cricket Club, a team based around former students of George Watson's College in Edinburgh. Hughes would later call this period "possibly the best six months of my life."

=== Test debut ===
Playing for Western Australia against the touring Pakistan team in December 1976, Hughes made 137 runs from only 167 balls, making a claim to the attention of the national selectors. The Australian reported that "[r]arely has a batsman of his limited experience been seen in a more majestic performance". A few weeks later, Hughes was called up as twelfth man for Australia in the New Year's Test match at the Melbourne Cricket Ground (MCG). Substituting on the field for Ian Davis, he injured his shoulder attempting to catch Imran Khan. Missing the rest of the Pakistan matches, Hughes was included in the Australian team to tour New Zealand. Hughes, again suffering from homesickness, did not play in either of the two Tests.

Four weeks after marrying his girlfriend, Hughes left for England as a member of the 1977 Australian team. The tour was an unhappy one for the Australian team, losing the series three Tests to nil to England and the embryonic World Series Cricket concept caused rifts between the team members. Hughes did not play much cricket early in the tour; Wisden Cricketers' Almanack saying that he was "kept in such idleness that [he] might have claimed restraint of trade." He was selected to make his Test debut in the fifth Test, after the series had already been decided. Hughes, bitter about his treatment by the tour selectors, was unhappy. Hughes told a reporter congratulating him about his upcoming Test debut "Those pricks, know they have made me part of their failure". In an uncharacteristic performance, Hughes faced thirty-four deliveries before he made his first run. It was the only run he made that innings, before he was dismissed by Mike Hendrick. Hughes' teammate Geoff Dymock later said, "They threw [Hughes] to the wolves."

=== World Series Cricket years ===
World Series Cricket (WSC) divided the Australian team into two camps; those who had signed lucrative contracts with Kerry Packer's rebel group and those, like Hughes, who had remained with the establishment Australian Cricket Board (ACB). Hughes' boyhood idol, Austin Robertson Jr, acted as Packer's agent, signing players to the new cricket venture, eventually signing 13 of the 17 players who toured England; Hughes was a notable omission. Robertson claims that he did not approach Hughes about a WSC contract; Hughes claims that he was approached but indicated his unwillingness. In September 1977, Hughes made clear his attachment to traditional cricket in a statement.

It is completely understandable that players approaching retirement or even past players should avail themselves of an opportunity to capitalise on their skills. [...] The necessity for all young players—and we do have some brilliant ones knocking on the door—is to dedicate, train long and hard ... That is what I propose to do. That is exactly where I stand.

— Kim Hughes,

The first season of the divide saw the ACB bring the 41-year-old Bob Simpson out of retirement to captain the Australians against the touring Indians. Hughes fell one run short of a century against the tourists for Western Australia, but missed out on selection for the first Test at the Gabba in Brisbane; instead he was named as twelfth man. Hughes was chosen for the second Test at the WACA Ground in Perth, where he made 28 in the first innings and a duck in the second. He was omitted for the third Test in Melbourne, but returned for the fourth Test in Sydney. At the Sydney Cricket Ground Hughes made 17 and 19, with Bishan Bedi dismissing him on both occasions. Again, Hughes was left out of the Australian team; at this stage he had not played two Test matches consecutively. At the end of the summer, Ian Chappell wrote Hughes "is still a long way off from realising anything like that potential."

Hughes travelled to the Caribbean as a member of the Australian cricket team to play the West Indies in 1978. During the first match on tour against the Leeward Islands at Basseterre, Saint Kitts, Hughes suffered from appendicitis and had his appendix removed. The wound became infected and Hughes had to beg team management to be allowed to remain on the tour. Despite his later recovery, he did not play any of the Tests; his personality and attitude to the game did not meet with the approval of the captain, Simpson. A reporter wrote at the time, "Kim Hughes is the most frustrated, disillusioned young man in the West Indies today and with good reason. [...] Never, at any stage, has Simpson considered Hughes a Test prospect."

Mike Brearley led his English team to Australia in 1978–79 on the back of his victory over the Greg Chappell-led Australians in 1977. With Simpson standing down from international cricket, Graham Yallop was the new Australian captain, leading an inexperienced Australian team, with only Gary Cosier having played over 10 Tests before the series began; Hughes had only played three Tests. The Australians were no match for the experienced England team, losing the series and the Ashes five Tests to one. Playing in all six Tests, Hughes scored 345 runs at an average of 28.75; only Yallop scored more runs in what was a poor batting performance by Australia. Hughes' only century came in the first Test at Brisbane. Having been bowled out for 116, in their first innings, Australia had lost three wickets for only 49 runs (49/3) in the second innings when Hughes joined Yallop at the crease. Yallop and Hughes scored 170 runs in partnership before Yallop was dismissed for 102. Hughes continued on and was the last Australian wicket to fall, top-scoring with 129, his maiden Test century. While England won the match by seven wickets, Hughes and Yallop at least made the Australian effort look respectable.

=== A young captain ===
With the Ashes series played and lost, Australia hosted Pakistan for a two-Test series at the end of the Australian 1978–79 season. Pakistan won the first Test by 71 runs after Sarfraz Nawaz took an incredible seven wickets for only one run in the Australian second innings. Before the second Test, Yallop tore his calf muscle playing for Richmond—his club side—and had to withdraw from the Australian team. Hughes, playing only his eleventh Test, was named as Australian captain; the first Western Australian to lead the national team.

Hughes took to the leadership role with enthusiasm, boasting of a "new era". Bowling in the nets before the start of the third day's play, Hughes rolled his ankle and was not able to take his place in the field. While he sat in the dressing room, the Australian team, desperate to end Pakistan's ten-wicket partnership, "Mankaded" (ie, run out the batsman at the non-striker's end in lieu of proceeding to bowl the ball) Sikander Bakht. During Australia's second innings, Andrew Hilditch picked up the ball after a return from a fieldsman and, in an attempt to be helpful, handed it to Sarfraz. Sarfraz appealed for a handling the ball dismissal, and Hilditch was given out by umpire Tony Crafter. While within the laws of the game, both dismissals were generally seen as unsportsmanlike. Hughes said of his own team's actions, "It was just part of cricket" while condemning the actions of Sarfraz: "It just wasn't cricket". In the end, Australia won the second Test and tied the series one Test apiece. Hughes had started his Australian captaincy with a win.

His success in his one Test in charge saw Hughes appointed as captain of the Australian team for the 1979 Cricket World Cup to be held in England. The Australian team was not expected to do well and lived up to those low expectations by not making the semi-finals. A Test series in India was next for Hughes and his team. In a rain-affected series, Australia was unable to win a match, losing two and drawing another four. However, Wisden had praise for Hughes, remarking that there "was a marked development in Hughes's technique of playing spin bowling" and that "the heavy burden of captaincy had no adverse effect on his batting". His best performance was in the first Test at Chennai (then called Madras), where he scored exactly 100 runs in the first innings, batting in a responsible fashion. Over the series, Hughes topped the aggregate and the averages for Australia, scoring 594 runs at an average of 59.40.

=== Reunification ===
"One of [my mother's] most prominent early memories of me is when I was sitting on the lounge-room floor, eyes fixed on the television, watching Kim Hughes bat. Kim was my first hero in Test cricket, a batsman who, when he was on, was unstoppable. I remember him taking on the West Indies at the MCG the week after my seventh birthday, their fast bowlers aiming at his chest and head, him hooking and pulling fearlessly. That knock stays burned in my memory and probably set the standard for the sort of cricketer I wanted to become."

— Australian captain Ricky Ponting on Hughes.

In 1979, World Series Cricket and the Australian Cricket Board agreed to the reunification of the Australian team. Hughes—along with the other establishment players—now had to compete with the returning WSC players, not only for spots in the Australian team, but also for spots in their respective state teams as well. Many experts in the press did not include Hughes in a full-strength Australian squad and former Australian captain and Packer player, Ian Chappell agreed saying, "Frankly, I can't even see a spot in the [Australian] squad for Hughes" Ultimately Hughes was included in the Australian squad, but was now vice-captain, with Greg Chappell—the captain before the split—restored to this position.

England and the West Indies both toured Australia in 1979–80. Hughes started the summer well, making 139 not out in the first Test against a West Indian line-up including bowlers such as Andy Roberts, Michael Holding and Joel Garner. He hit 18 boundaries that innings, 10 of them from the hook shot. The next Test, against England in Perth, Hughes was out one run short of his century, attempting to hit Derek Underwood out of the ground. A short tour to play Pakistan followed in February 1980, where Hughes made 182 runs in the three-Test series, averaging 36.40.

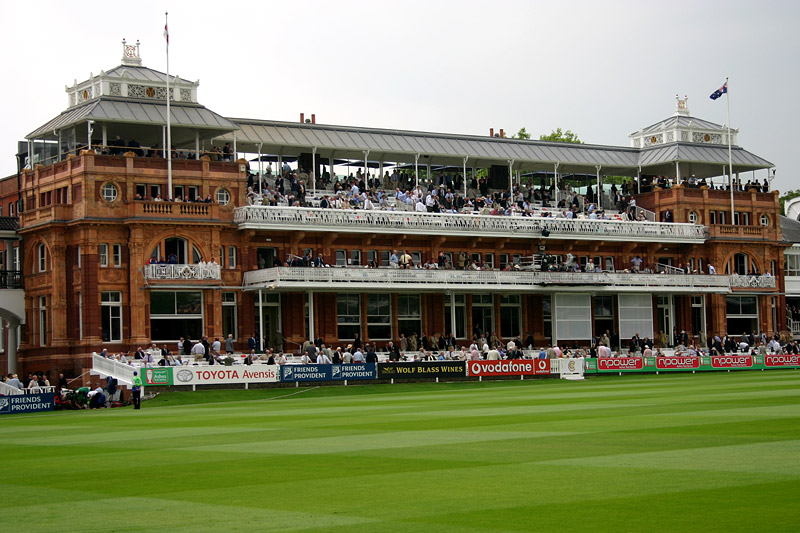
The Pavilion at Lord's Cricket Ground. Hughes hit a six from the bowling of Chris Old that landed in the top deck.

The Centenary Test at Lord's Cricket Ground in August 1980 was a triumph for Hughes. Much of the first three days' play was lost due to bad weather but in that time Hughes played what Wisden would describe as "two innings of the highest quality." Hughes scored a century in the first innings, 117 runs including 14 fours and 3 sixes. His second innings only totalled 84 runs before he was dismissed by Ian Botham. It was this innings, however, that was seen as his most brilliant of the match. His 84 runs included 11 fours and 2 sixes, one of which struck the top deck of the pavilion; Hughes having stepped down the pitch to hit Chris Old back over his head. Former England captain Gubby Allen could not recall a more remarkable straight hit. Cricket writer RS Whitington had to cast his mind back more than 40 years to describe Hughes' batting as "the nearest approach to Stan McCabe in full flurry". The Test was drawn and Hughes was given the Man of the Match award, having batted on each of the five days of the match. His performance in the Centenary Test saw him named as one of the 1981 Wisden Cricketers of the Year.

Hughes struggled against New Zealand in 1980–81, making only 102 runs at an average of 27.25 in three Tests. Rumours about Hughes' selection prospects again began to circulate. While Hughes was batting in the traditional Australia Day Test in Adelaide, this time against India, later that summer, his nemesis Ian Chappell opined on the airwaves that "Hughes really does need to build up a big score here. People are starting to talk about him being dropped." In seeming response to this criticism, Hughes scored a double-century; 213 runs including 21 boundaries. A "magnificent innings" Wisden declared, adding that Hughes' batting "touched the heights" and that "[w]ith brilliant footwork, he scored freely off the spinners." Hughes dedicated his innings to his newborn twin sons, Sean and Simon.

=== On-again, off-again skipper ===
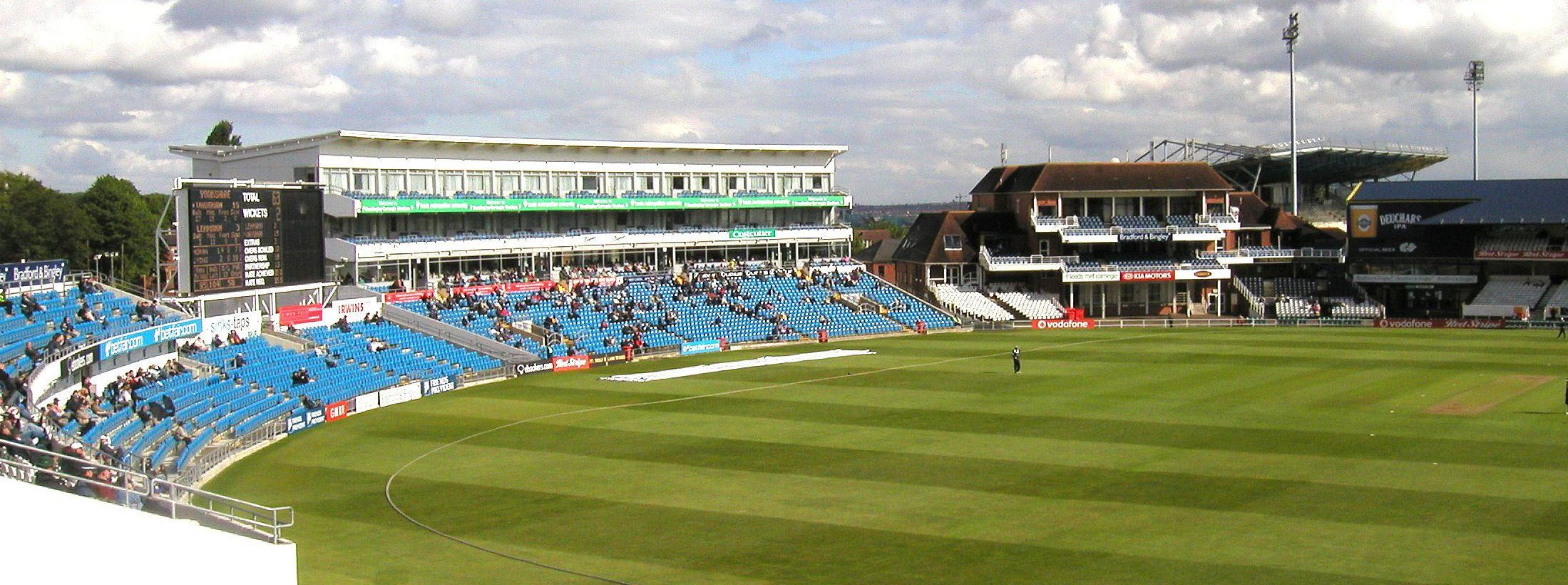
Headingley Stadium, venue for the third Test in the 1981 Ashes series

In 1981, Australia was scheduled to tour England to play for the Ashes. Before the squad was selected, Greg Chappell announced that he would not be leading the Australian team, citing business and family reasons. In his absence, the Australian Cricket Board turned to Hughes as captain. The Australian team arrived in England in May and was greeted by rain, leaving them short of needed match practice. Nevertheless, Hughes and his team unexpectedly won the preliminary One Day International series. The first Test was played at Trent Bridge in Nottingham. Australia won the low scoring and rain affected match by six wickets, after Hughes had taken the opportunity to put England into bat after winning the toss. Australia then had the best of a drawn match in the second Test at Lord's. After making a pair in this match, Ian Botham resigned his position as captain of England.

The third Test of the series was played at Headingley in Leeds. Hughes' Australians had the better of the early part of the match. Batting first, Australia made 401 runs; with Hughes contributing 89 of them. In response England only scored 174 runs and Hughes enforced the follow-on (forced to take its second batting innings immediately after its first). England were reduced to 135/7 in their second innings and the on-ground bookmakers decided to offer odds of 500–1 on an England victory. Ian Botham and Bob Willis turned the match on its head. In an extraordinary innings Botham made 149 runs, allowing England to set a target of 130 runs for Australia to win. Willis then took eight wickets for only 43 runs as Australia were all out for 111. Hughes and his Australian team had lost the match from what should have been an unbeatable position. Later, explaining what had happened, Hughes said "Botham rode his luck and we couldn't get him out. [...] In the first innings they missed catches—even Botham and [David] Gower missed them—but in the second they held everything. I'd seen Bob Willis bowl just as well at other times and not take nearly as many wickets." Australia lost the fourth Test at Edgbaston in Birmingham. This time, requiring only 151 runs to win the match, Australia reached 105/4 and seemed certain to win the match. Again, it was Botham who turned the match around, capturing 5 wickets in the space of 28 deliveries while only conceding one run. In the final Test of the series, Hughes chose to shepherd the strike to protect his partner Yallop, who was a specialist batsman. This action, something normally only done for poor, tail-end batsmen, humiliated Yallop. England won the series three Tests to one and retained the Ashes. The series was later known as "Botham's summer."

With Chappell again available, Hughes returned to the vice-captaincy for the 1981–82 Tests. Australia played Pakistan first in an ill-tempered three Test series; won by the Australians two Tests to one. Hughes started the series with a century (106) in the first Test in Perth and finished the series having scored 193 runs overall. The other touring side that summer were the West Indies, widely considered the best team in the world at that time and supported by a potent fast bowling attack. The first Test in the series was played at the Melbourne Cricket Ground. Both teams were critical of the pitch prepared at the MCG for the Test.

It was a shocking wicket. If you get a bouncer halfway down the wicket, on a normal wicket you duck under it but on that MCG wicket you weren't sure whether it was going to fly over your head or cannon into you. I ducked into a Joel Garner bouncer and copped it on the back of my head.

— Australian cricketer Terry Alderman,

Australia were quickly reduced to 26/4 before Hughes started his effort to recover the Australian innings. Hughes decided to attack the West Indian bowling. In an interview later he said "that to hang around and defend was going to be a waste of time ... So I thought what I could do was try to play as many shots as possible." When the ninth wicket fell, Hughes had made 71 and it appeared a century was out of reach. Hughes' remaining batting partner, Alderman, was a poor batsman; it had taken him nine matches to make his first first-class run. Alderman, despite telling Hughes that he didn't give himself much chance, managed to stay with Hughes long enough for Hughes to reach 100 runs. Hughes' innings was widely praised. West Indian Andy Roberts said "He took up the challenge and it paid off for him. It was a great innings. You don't find one batsman playing that sort of innings on more than one occasion. That was just his day." The Wisden 100, a ranking of the Top 100 Test Innings of all time, ranked that innings as number nine.

=== Last days of the Chappell era ===
In three Tests, Hughes scored only 29 runs on tour in New Zealand in March 1982. Greg Chappell withdrew from the Australian team to tour Pakistan in 1982, along with Dennis Lillee and Len Pascoe. The fourteen Australian Cricket Board delegates met in March to decide on an interim captain for the tour, with the two candidates Hughes and Rod Marsh. Hughes narrowly won the vote, 8 votes to 6. Marsh was offered the vice-captaincy, which he declined. Marsh arrived late for the tour as a result of his son's illness. It was a difficult tour for Hughes' Australians. All members of the touring squad suffered from illness at one stage and at one stage Hughes threatened to take his team back to Australia after several Australian fielders were hit by projectiles thrown from the stands. Intelligent bowling by Pakistan's Abdul Qadir combined with poor fielding and lack of depth in Australia's batting saw Pakistan defeat Australia three Tests to nil.

Hughes had hoped to retain the captaincy for the Ashes series in 1982–83, but the ACB chose to restore Chappell to his former position. Hughes' demotion did not affect his batting, however. He scored 469 runs against the English at an average of 67.00. His consistent run scoring saw Bill O'Reilly call Hughes "Mr. Reliable" and even Ian Chappell remarked that "After this series, not only should Hughes' conscience be clear but his slate clean in regard to the 1981 [Ashes] disaster." The highlight of the summer for Hughes was the final Test in Sydney where he batted for over 6 hours to score 137 runs. Australia retrieved the Ashes, winning the series two Tests to one. Not long after the match, Chappell relinquished his position as Australian captain; Hughes was now captain of a full-strength Australian team for the first time.

Australia did not make it out of the group stage in the 1983 Cricket World Cup, winning only two of their six matches played. Hughes' team was embarrassed by a loss in their first match against Zimbabwe, at the time a mainly amateur side. There was a chance that Australia could still make the semi-finals with a win against India. Hughes chose to sit out the match, to give a minor injury time to heal. In his absence the Australian team was dismissed for 129 and bundled out of the tournament. Hughes decision to pull out of the match drew some criticism from the Australian press: "Hughes decision not to play was lamentable [...] this Australian team does not have a capable leader." On his return to Australia, David Hookes publicly advocated for Rod Marsh to be appointed Australian captain in Hughes' place, saying on Adelaide radio, "Maybe Kim has got to be an apprentice to someone everyone respects." Hughes replied 'It's nice to know the Australian captain has got the support of his vice-captain." Under some pressure from cricket officials, Hughes was persuaded that he should stand down from the captaincy and a letter was drafted to this effect; he changed his mind the following morning.

Once again, the Australian Cricket Board voted 8–6 to appoint Hughes as captain for the 1983–84 series against Pakistan. This time Hughes led a full strength Australian team, including former captain Greg Chappell and his fellow Western Australians, Dennis Lillee and Rod Marsh. Hughes' Australians defeated Pakistan comfortably, two Tests to nil. Hughes himself scored 375 runs in the series, including one century at Adelaide where he "confounded the cunning Qadir". At the end the season, Chappell, Lillee and Marsh—the Australian team's most experienced players—retired from international cricket.

=== Downfall ===
Australia was scheduled to tour the West Indies in 1984. The players selected for the tour were presented with official contracts by the Australian Cricket Board. The contracts sought to bind the players to only play in ACB approved cricket for a period of twelve months after the expiry of the tour, without offering any additional compensation. To the dismay of the Board, Hughes stood by his team and with his lawyer drafted a compromise agreement that gave the players some financial security. The West Indies was commonly regarded at that times as the best team in the world and Hughes' new-look Australian team now had to take them on without the recently retired Marsh, Lillee and Chappell. Bob Simpson commented, "The saddest and hardest lot for any captain is taking over the remnants of a once-great team. I wouldn't be in Hughes' shoes for quids." In addition, the Australian team was badly affected by injury; Yallop withdrew with a knee injury and Kepler Wessels, Graeme Wood, Steve Smith, Rodney Hogg and Carl Rackemann all were unfit to play at times during the tour.

Australia lost the series three Tests to nil. After managing to draw the first two Tests, they lost the next three; the West Indies did not lose a second innings wicket all tour. Hughes did not have a successful tour with the bat, scoring 215 runs at an average of 21.50. The pressure of the tour told on Hughes. In a match against Trinidad and Tobago, Hughes protested against what he saw as unreasonableness by the opposition by treating the remainder of the match with contempt; not attempting to win. Afterwards Hughes said he could not care less about the welfare of cricket in Trinidad and Tobago; the management fined him for this comment. In the second Test, Rodney Hogg threw a punch at Hughes, frustrated that he was not given the field he wanted by his captain.

Hughes then enjoyed a rare overseas captaincy triumph, leading Australia to a 3–0 victory in a one day series against India. However there was no extended respite for the Australians; the West Indies returned to Australia for the 1984–85 season. The Australian team remained positive; Allan Border said, "We are thinking of beating them, Laugh all you want." Despite this attitude, the Australians lost the first Test by an innings and 112 runs. Hughes made only four runs in the first innings, out playing the hook shot despite a pre-series pledge not to play the stroke. Again, the pressure from the media came; Ian Chappell used his newspaper column to heavily criticise Hughes. Chappell continued his criticism of Hughes during the standard pre-match interview before the broadcast of the second Test in Brisbane. The Test was another struggle for the Australians. Australia was bowled out for 175 and Hughes then dropped two catches in the West Indian innings. In the Australian second innings, Hughes made only four. The next morning, before play, Hughes rang the Australia team manager and said "I want to quit as Australian captain."

=== Relinquishing the captaincy ===
With assistance from Greg Chappell, Hughes wrote his letter of resignation. During the day's play, Hughes confided in his teammates, announcing his decision. Allan Border, his vice-captain, advised him to reconsider; Hughes refused. At the press conference at the end of the day's play, Hughes announced, "I have something to read."

The Australian Cricket Captaincy is something that I've held very dear to me. However playing the game with total enjoyment has always been of the greatest importance. The constant speculation, criticism and inuendo [sic] by former players and sections of the media over the past 4–5 years have finally taken their toll. It is in the interests of the team, Australian Cricket and myself that I have informed the ACB of my decision to stand down as Australian Captain. I look forward to continuing my career in whichever capacity the selectors and the Board see fit with the same integrity and credability [sic] I have displayed as Australian captain.

— Kim Hughes, 26 November 1984

Hughes was visibly emotional while reading his letter and broke down in tears halfway through, leaving the rest for team manager Bob Merriman to read on his behalf as he quickly left the press conference. Australia went on to lose the match by eight wickets, with Hughes scoring 34 and 4.

Press reaction to Hughes' resignation and his emotional state was mixed. Former Australian captain and television broadcaster Bill Lawry said "The demise of Kim Hughes in Brisbane in a manner equal to be being dragged down like a dingo in the pack and devoured by your own, within and without, was a disgrace." The respected ABC radio broadcaster Alan McGilvray on the other hand was more blunt: "[Hughes] is a little boy who has not yet grown up." Hughes was widely mocked for his tears, which were seen as unmanly and un-Australian. Barry Humphries—the satirist behind Dame Edna Everage and Sir Les Patterson—wondered if "Kim's cricket box was on too tight" and claimed that a real Australian in that situation "would simply chunder". In 2002, a British journalist remarked of Hughes' tears as "one inadequate captain getting life so out of proportion as to make a complete clown of himself." It is claimed in the press from time to time that Hughes is now as much remembered for his tears as for his achievements in cricket.

Hughes retained his place in the Australian team for the third Test in Adelaide under new captain, Allan Border. Hughes failed in both innings, scoring a duck in the first innings and only two runs in the second. Hughes joined the Australian team in Melbourne for the fourth Test. Despite warm support from the MCG crowd, Hughes made a humiliating pair; in his last innings he was out from the first ball he faced—a golden duck. He never played in a Test match again. He played in some of the remaining One Day Internationals but without success. When the Australian team was chosen for the tour of England in 1985, Hughes was not included.

=== Rebel and retirement ===
While the Australian team for England was being selected, the South African Cricket Union (SACU) was arranging a "rebel" Australian team to tour South Africa. As a result of the apartheid policy of the white minority government, South Africa was cast out of the International Cricket Council and subjected to a boycott. With his old adversaries Greg Chappell as a national selector and Rod Marsh playing an analogous role for the Western Australian team, Hughes felt that his options in Australian cricket were limited and he chose to join the rebel team as the captain. Hughes was one of the last players to join the rebel team; indeed he found out that many of the rebel squad had signed up with the South Africans during the 1983 World Cup, when he was confirmed as captain. At a press conference after the announcement of the team, Hughes announced:

I am going to South Africa with an open, and I hope, intelligent mind. I believe I have the ability to judge right and wrong. I also believe I will be able to comment and suggest ways the situation can be improved. [...] When I stand up in front of schoolchildren and business groups I [will be] in a better position to let the people at home know how the rest of the world lives.

— Kim Hughes,

Hughes was heavily criticised for his decision. Desmond Tutu called him a hypocrite and Prime Minister Bob Hawke called him a comforter of racists. The criticism was hurtful to Hughes who, seemingly puzzled, remarked to friends "People think I'm a racist." In South Africa, even before his team arrived Hughes was "a hero, larger than a Reagan ... [Australia's] most exotic export since Breaker Morant."

The rebel team played two series against the South African team—in 1985–86 and 1986–87—and lost them both 1 "Test" to nil. In the first series, Hughes left himself stranded on 97 when the second "Test" at Newlands in Cape Town ended in a draw. In the following match at Wanderers in Johannesburg, Hughes was dismissed for a king pair; dismissed by first ball he faced in both innings. Hughes scored 585 runs at an average of 45.00 in the 1985–86 South African season and followed that with 596 runs at an average of 42.57 in 1986–87. In 2007, Hughes reflected on his participation in the rebel tours: "Cricket was at the forefront of trying to break down barriers and when you look how cricket has developed in South Africa I was very pleased to be involved."

Following the rebel tours, Hughes returned to Western Australia. The Western Australian Cricket Association attempted to ban him from club cricket in Western Australia. In response Hughes took action against the WACA for restraint of trade; he won the case in the Federal Court of Australia—the WACA lost several hundred thousand dollars in court costs. Before the start of the 1987–88 season, Marsh resigned his position as a Western Australian selector; by December Hughes had made his way back into the Western Australian team as an opener, where he scored 76 runs against New South Wales. He played six matches for Western Australia that year scoring 223 runs at an average of 22.30. The following season Hughes played only two games for Western Australia, with the state side finding little room for a man now aged 34.

In September 1989, Hughes signed on as captain of Natal in the South African Currie Cup competition. His two seasons with Natal were disappointing for the team and himself; Natal struggled on the field and there was disharmony amongst the squad. With the bat he scored 176 runs at an average of 13.53 in 1989–90 and 266 at 24.16 in 1990–91. He did, however, have a positive influence on two cricketers who later represented South Africa. Andrew Hudson claimed that "Kim installed a positiveness and a self-belief" in him and Jonty Rhodes—who stayed in Hughes' home during Natal home matches—wanted to play with the same passion as Hughes: "There are too many robots ... Kim was emotional because he cared. I wanted to be the same." During his second season at Natal, Hughes was dropped from the Natal side and later was dropped from the Natal "B" side. He retired from all first-class cricket in February 1991.

== Off the field ==
=== Personal life ===
After finishing high school, Hughes attended Graylands Teachers College to train as a primary school teacher. Graylands was established as a stop-gap measure but by the time Hughes arrived it had been operating for two decades and the facilities were run down and almost derelict. In 1974, his final year at Graylands, Hughes was elected President of the student council and in this role he led a campaign to improve the facilities for the faculty and students. The campaign, which included an appearance by Hughes on the ABC television current affairs program This Day Tonight, met with some measure of success.

His first job as a teacher was at Linden Park Primary School in Linden Park during his attempt to make the South Australian team in 1974. After teaching, he found employment in the finance industry, working first for City Building Society as a promotions manager and later for Town & Country Building Society in a marketing role. Town & Country used Hughes to promote their business both in advertising and in through direct contact with investors. In return, Hughes was afforded time away from work to pursue cricket. The General Manager of Town & Country described the relationship: "[Hughes] was a great player, well presented, good looking. He was a family man. He fitted the Town & Country mould admirably."

Hughes was a skilled Australian rules footballer as a junior and was invited to play with the Claremont Football Club in the West Australian National Football League. He played two seasons at Claremont—1973 and 1974—alternating between the under-21 and the reserve teams, but did not manage to make the senior team. The Claremont coach, Verdun Howell, described Hughes as having "Great ball skills, brilliant hand-eye coordination and a very, very reliable kick [...] And he showed courage. He went full throttle at the ball and didn't look for a second option." Howell told Hughes one evening at practice, "I believe you could go as far as you want in football." Hughes played at full forward for the under-21 team and mainly in the centre in the reserves. His brief football career was interrupted by injury—he broke his neck falling off a desk at teachers college—and eventually he advised Howell that he was "very much looking towards cricket" in future.

Hughes was aged 14 when he met Jenny Davidson, a fellow student at City Beach High School. The pair married in March 1977 and within four weeks Hughes left for a four-month tour of England. In January 1981, Jenny gave birth to twins. Another son and a daughter followed. Kim's brother Glenn played first-class cricket for Orange Free State and Tasmania.

Since retirement Hughes has been chairman of selectors for the Western Australian Cricket Association from 1999 to 2000 and more recently an occasional cricket commentator on ABC radio. He was Head of Cricket at Hale School, in Wembley Downs, Perth. A dining room at the WACA Ground is named the Kim Hughes Room.

=== Style and personality ===
The marvellous appeal of Hughes's batting lies in the repertoire of his strokes and his unashamed enthusiasm in playing them. Most are straight from the copybook and executed with the fine touch of the artist's brush; some, however, are of his own design and despatched with a grand flourish. The high backlift, the skipping footwork, the flashing blade and the full-blooded follow-through – all hallmarks of the great stroke-players – are evident at their very best when Hughes is in full flight.

— Wisden Cricketers' Almanack,

Hughes batted with an orthodox upright, side-on stance. He gripped the bat high on the handle and played his strokes with a controlled backlift and a full follow through. He got his body well behind the ball in defence but early in his innings tended to move around the crease in front of his stumps, leaving him vulnerable to a leg before wicket dismissal.

Hughes was widely considered by those who knew him as a likeable and friendly person; a person who wanted to be liked. He said of himself when appointed captain of Australia, "The one thing in my favour is that I will never change. I hope I will always be a likeable enough, easy-to-get-along-with type of person." His biographer noted, "[F]riends, team-mates, coaches, teachers, officials, close observers. Almost all mentioned Kim's niceness. He addresses people by their first name. He loves being around and encouraging children. He likes being people's best friend."

[Hughes] was well loved. He had a generous heart and was a great optimist. He was fun loving and fun seeking and easily excitable.

— John Inverarity,

As captain Hughes was popular and obliging with the press and the public. English journalist Frank Keating said "Pulled this way and that by photographers, fringers, high commissioners, low commissioners, book commissioners, and hall-porter commissioners, [Hughes] never stopped being softly obliging." The journalist Adrian McGregor said of Hughes, "He was almost too amenable, too nice a guy. He was great with the media, would answer all sorts of questions, never told people to piss off. [...] It was almost like he didn't have the appropriate personality [to be captain]."

Hughes projected a confident image on the field. "A pretty cocky little fella" was how one early opponent in club cricket described Hughes. This cockiness pleased some but others like Bruce Duperouzel, Hughes's captain in a Western Australian colts team, thought that Hughes had "an extravagance that pushed the bounds of acceptability."

Fond of noting that he was born on Australia Day, Hughes was proudly Australian and keen to demonstrate this publicly. On his first tour to England, Hughes was often the only team member wearing the Australian team blazer. Hughes claimed that "the greatest day of [his] life" was Australia II's victory over the New York Yacht Club's entry in the 1983 America's Cup yacht race; Hughes sat down with his twin sons, waved mini-Australian flags purchased especially for the event and watched a replay of the race twice more that day.

Hughes's nickname was "Claggy", a reference to the ubiquitous Clag glue found in classrooms across Australia.

== Notes ==
Preceded by Graham Yallop	Australian Test cricket captains 1978/9–1979/80	Succeeded by Greg Chappell
Preceded by Greg Chappell	Australian Test cricket captains 1981	Succeeded by Greg Chappell
Preceded by Greg Chappell	Australian Test cricket captains 1982/3	Succeeded by Greg Chappell
Preceded by Greg Chappell	Australian Test cricket captains 1983/4–1984/5	Succeeded by Allan Border
Preceded by Graham Yallop	Australian One Day International cricket captains 1979–1984/5	Succeeded by David Hookes
