= Mike Selvey =

English cricketer and writer

Personal information
- Full name: Michael Walter William Selvey
- Born: 25 April 1948 (age 78); Chiswick, Middlesex, England
- Batting: Right-handed
- Bowling: Right-arm fast-medium

International information
- National side: England
- Test debut: 8 July 1976 v West Indies
- Last Test: 11 February 1977 v India

Career statistics
| Competition | Tests | FC | LA |
|---|---|---|---|
| Matches | 3 | 278 | 267 |
| Runs scored | 15 | 2,405 | 840 |
| Batting average | 7.50 | 12.65 | 10.24 |
| 100s/50s | 0/0 | 0/4 | 0/0 |
| Top score | 5* | 67 | 38* |
| Balls bowled | 492 | 45,474 | 12,698 |
| Wickets | 6 | 772 | 332 |
| Bowling average | 57.16 | 26.66 | 22.12 |
| 5 wickets in innings | 0 | 38 | 2 |
| 10 wickets in match | 0 | 4 | 0 |
| Best bowling | 4/41 | 7/20 | 5/18 |
| Catches/stumpings | 1/– | 79/– | 50/– |
- Source: CricInfo, 8 April 2023

Michael Walter William Selvey (born 25 April 1948) is an English former Test and county cricketer, and now a cricket writer and commentator.

A fast-medium bowler, Selvey played in three Tests for England in 1976 and 1977. He played county cricket for Surrey, Middlesex and Glamorgan.

He served as the 25th President of Middlesex (2019–2023).

== Life and career ==
Selvey was educated at Honeywell Primary School, Battersea Grammar School, the University of Manchester and Emmanuel College, Cambridge. He played cricket for Surrey and Cambridge University before joining Middlesex in 1972, where he spent the majority of his playing career.

Selvey made his Test debut against the West Indies at Old Trafford in 1976, when he opened the bowling and took the wickets of Roy Fredericks, Viv Richards and Alvin Kallicharran for only six runs in his first 20 balls. He took 4 for 41 in that innings, and 6 for 152 in the match, but still ended on the losing side as England were beaten by 425 runs.

He only played two more Tests and failed to take a single wicket in either, in part due to Alan Knott dropping a routine chance from Roy Fredericks in Selvey's second Test at the Oval in the same year; the West Indies went on to make 687.

Despite playing no international cricket after 1977, Selvey was a key part of a Middlesex attack that won the County Championship outright three times (1976, 1980 and 1982) and shared the title once (1977). He was also in the Middlesex teams that won two Gillette Cups, in 1977 (when his figures were 12-4-22-2) and in 1980 in a London derby final against Surrey, when he again bowled a tight spell (12-5-17-2) to restrict the opposition. Selvey took 101 first-class wickets for Middlesex in the 1978 season, a feat that has not been matched by any Middlesex fast bowler since.

Selvey features in Mike Brearley's The Art of Captaincy and is quoted by Brearley as lamenting his notable skills as an into-the-wind bowler by remarking that his nose seemed to get flatter every year, as he would invariably be asked to bowl into the wind whilst Wayne Daniel and Vince van der Bijl bowled downhill with the wind behind them.

In 1983 he moved to Glamorgan as captain, but persistent injuries forced him to retire after only a season and a half.

Shortly after his retirement from playing cricket, Selvey became cricket correspondent of The Guardian newspaper. He retired on 23 September 2016 after 31 years in the role.

He also joined BBC Radio's Test Match Special as a summariser, beginning with England's 1984 tour to India; he continued with this role until being dropped from the team in 2008. Selvey has since become a summariser and guest on Talksport.

== Publications ==
- The Ashes Surrendered: The Guardian Book of the 1989 Ashes Series, Queen Anne Press, 1989
