= List of Australia One Day International wicket-keepers =

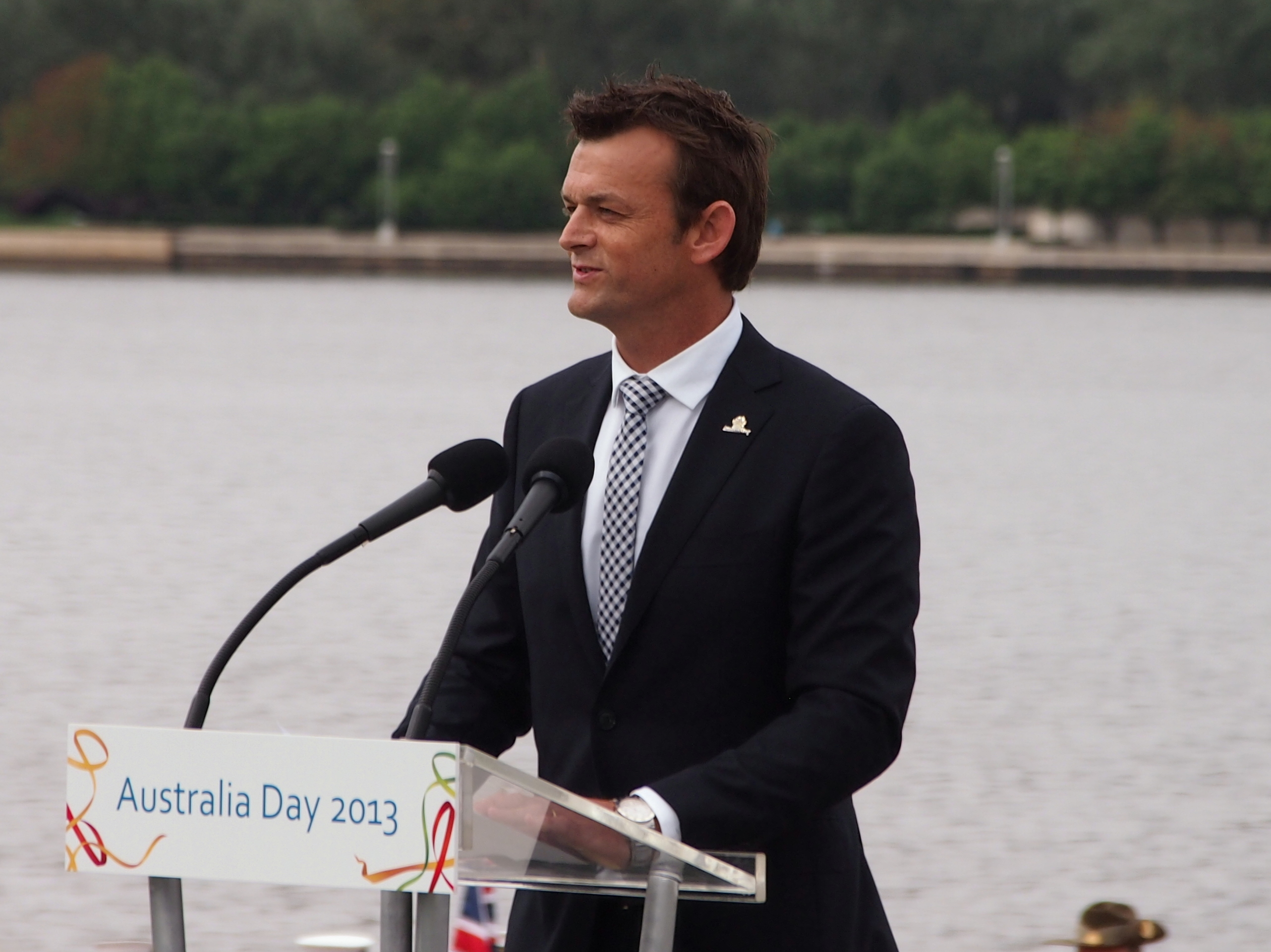
Adam Gilchrist, holds the record for most dismissals by an Australian wicket-keeper in ODI cricket

This is a chronological list of Australia ODIs wicket-keepers.

This list only includes players who have played as the designated keeper for a match. On occasions, another player may have stepped in to relieve the primary wicket-keeper due to injury or the keeper bowling.

Statistics are correct as of 6 February 2024.

No.	Player	Span	ODIs	Catches	Stumpings	Total dismissals
1	Rod Marsh	1971–1984	92	120	4	124
2	Richie Robinson	1977	1	3	1	1
3	Steve Rixon	1978–1985	6	9	2	11
4	John Maclean	1979	2	0	0	0
5	Kevin Wright	1979	5	8	0	8
6	Roger Woolley	1983	4	1	1	2
7	Wayne Phillips	1984–1986	42	42	7	49
8	Tim Zoehrer	1986–1994	22	21	3	23
9	Greg Dyer	1986–1988	23	24	4	28
10	Ian Healy	1988–1997	168	194	39	233
11	Mike Veletta	1989	1	1	0	1
12	David Boon	1992	1	0	0	0
13	Justin Langer	1994	4	1	1	2
14	Phil Emery	1994	1	3	0	3
15	Adam Gilchrist	1996–2008	281	416	54	480
16	Brad Haddin	2001–2015	117	170	11	181
17	Ryan Campbell	2002	2	4	1	5
18	Jimmy Maher	2003	4	8	0	8
19	Luke Ronchi	2008	4	5	2	7
20	Tim Paine	2009–2018	34	51	4	55
21	Graham Manou	2009	4	5	0	5
22	Matthew Wade	2012–2017	94	108	9	117
23	Peter Handscomb	2017	3	5	0	5
24	Alex Carey	2018–2023	70	82	8	90
25	Josh Inglis	2022–2024	15	19	2	21

== See also ==
- List of Australia ODI cricketers
- List of Australia Test wicket-keepers
- List of Australia T20I wicket-keepers
