= List of Australia Test wicket-keepers =

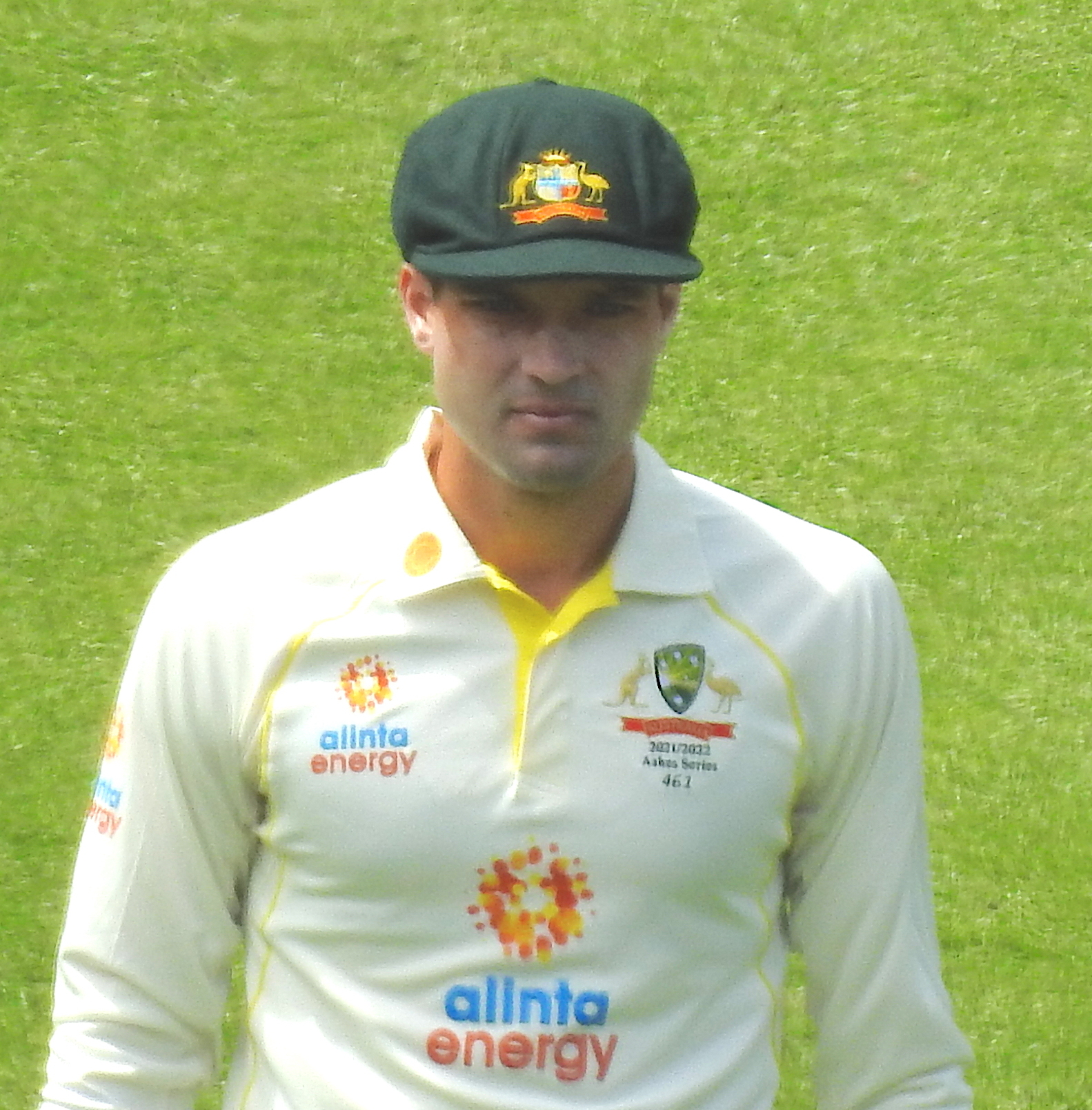
Alex Carey, current Australia Test wicket-keeper

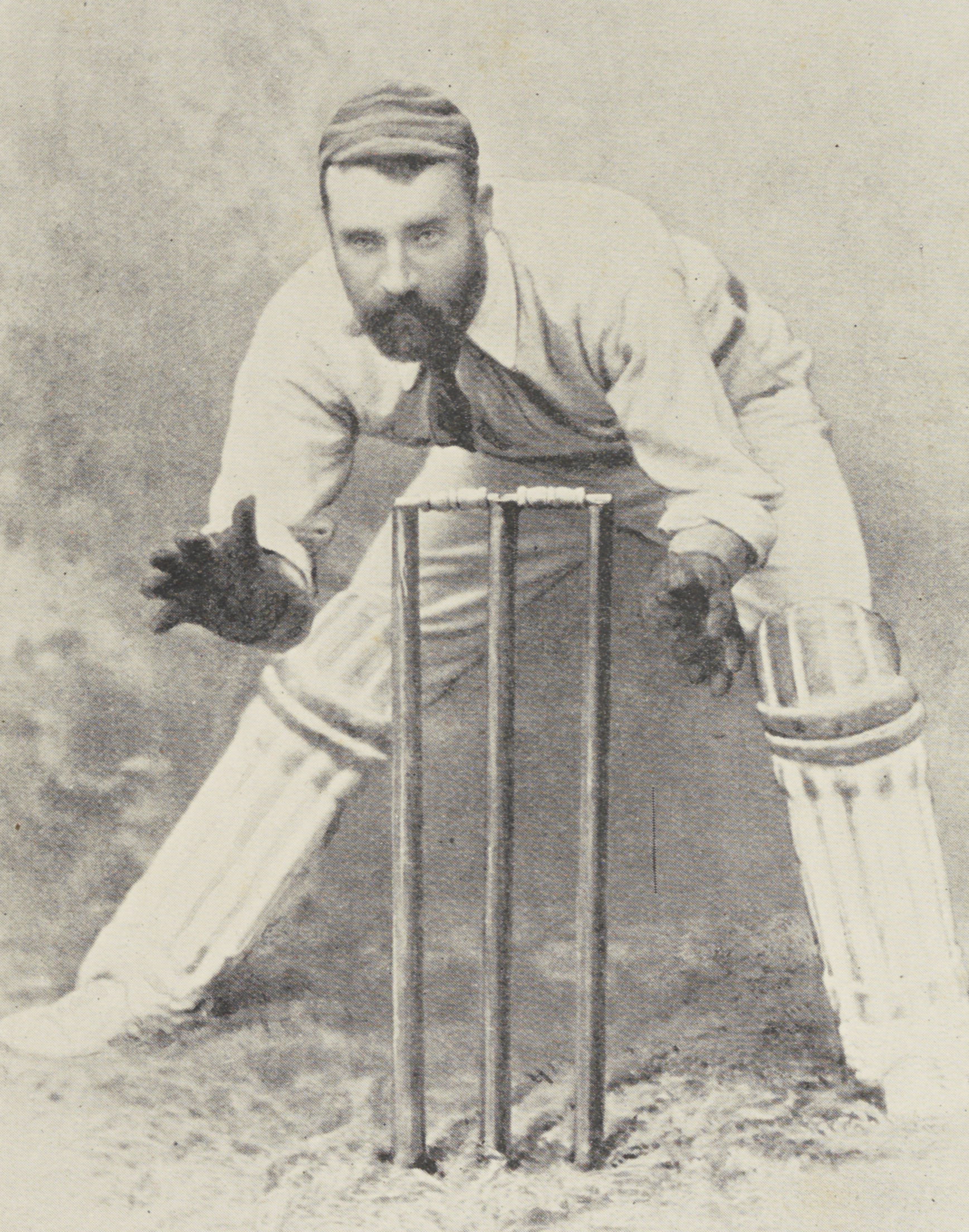
Jack Blackham, Australia's first and longest-serving wicket-keeper

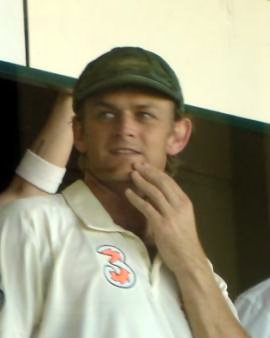
Adam Gilchrist, a pioneer of modern wicketkeeping, holds the record for most dismissals by an Australian wicket-keeper in Test cricket

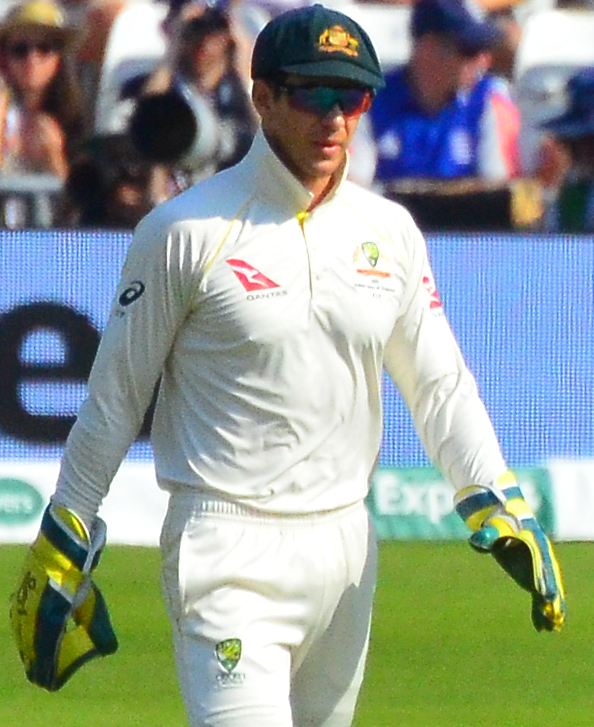
Tim Paine, is the longest-serving wicket-keeper captain for Australia

Wicket-keepers plays an important role in test cricket and, over time, the role has evolved into a specialist position.

In Test cricket, only 34 wicket-keepers have kept wicket in a match for Australia.

Jack Blackham was the first and longest-serving wicket-keeper who kept wicket for Australia and is considered first of the modern great wicketkeepers. He played in thirty-five Test matches between 1877 and 1894 for Australia against England in which he caught 36 catches and stumped 24. He was also the first wicket-keeper captain of the Australian cricket team.

Jack Blackham, Billy Murdoch, Barry Jarman, Adam Gilchrist, and Tim Paine are the only wicket-keepers who have captained the Australian cricket team. Paine is the longest serving wicket-keeper Test captain for Australia.

This list only includes players who have played as the designated keeper for a match. On occasions, another player may have stepped in to relieve the primary wicket-keeper due to injury or the keeper bowling, for example, David Warner replaced an injured Brad Haddin in a game against Pakistan where Azhar Ali was caught behind by Warner off the bowling of Mitchell Starc.

| No. | Player | Span | Tests | Catches | Stumpings | Total dismissals |
|---|---|---|---|---|---|---|
| 1 | Jack Blackham (Note: Blackham appeared in three further Tests as a fielder, taking two catches.) | 1877–1894 | 32 | 35 | 24 | 59 |
| 2 | Billy Murdoch (Note: Murdoch appeared in 17 further Tests as a fielder, taking 12 catches.) | 1882 | 1 | 2 | 0 | 2 |
| 3 | Affie Jarvis (Note: Jarvis appeared in two further Tests as a fielder, taking one catch.) | 1885–1895 | 9 | 8 | 9 | 17 |
| 4 | Frederick Burton (Note: Burton appeared in one further Test as a fielder, taking one catch.) | 1887 | 1 | 0 | 1 | 1 |
| 5 | Jim Kelly | 1896–1905 | 36 | 43 | 20 | 63 |
| 6 | Sammy Carter | 1907–1921 | 28 | 44 | 21 | 65 |
| 7 | Barlow Carkeek | 1912 | 6 | 6 | 0 | 6 |
| 8 | Bert Oldfield | 1920–1937 | 54 | 78 | 52 | 130 |
| 9 | Hammy Love | 1932–1933 | 1 | 3 | 0 | 3 |
| 10 | Ben Barnett | 1938 | 4 | 3 | 2 | 5 |
| 11 | Don Tallon | 1946–1953 | 21 | 50 | 8 | 58 |
| 12 | Ron Saggers | 1948–1950 | 6 | 16 | 8 | 24 |
| 13 | Gil Langley | 1951–1956 | 26 | 83 | 15 | 98 |
| 14 | Len Maddocks | 1955–1956 | 7 | 19 | 1 | 20 |
| 15 | Wally Grout | 1957–1966 | 51 | 163 | 24 | 187 |
| 16 | Barry Jarman | 1959–1969 | 19 | 50 | 4 | 54 |
| 17 | Brian Taber | 1966–1970 | 16 | 56 | 4 | 60 |
| 18 | Rod Marsh | 1970–1984 | 96 | 343 | 12 | 355 |
| 19 | Steve Rixon | 1977–1985 | 13 | 42 | 5 | 47 |
| 20 | John Maclean | 1978–1979 | 4 | 18 | 0 | 18 |
| 21 | Kevin Wright | 1978–1980 | 10 | 31 | 4 | 35 |
| 22 | Roger Woolley | 1983–1984 | 2 | 7 | 0 | 7 |
| 23 | Wayne B. Phillips (Note: Phillips appeared in nine further Tests as a fielder, taking nine catches.) | 1984–1986 | 18 | 43 | 0 | 43 |
| 24 | Tim Zoehrer | 1985–1987 | 10 | 18 | 1 | 19 |
| 25 | Greg Dyer | 1986–1988 | 6 | 22 | 2 | 24 |
| 26 | Ian Healy | 1988–1999 | 119 | 366 | 29 | 395 |
| 27 | Phil Emery | 1994 | 1 | 5 | 1 | 6 |
| 28 | Adam Gilchrist | 1999–2008 | 96 | 379 | 37 | 416 |
| 29 | Brad Haddin | 2008–2015 | 66 | 262 | 8 | 270 |
| 30 | Graham Manou | 2009 | 1 | 3 | 0 | 3 |
| 31 | Tim Paine | 2010–2021 | 35 | 150 | 7 | 157 |
| 32 | Matthew Wade (Note: Wade appeared in 14 further Tests as a fielder, taking 11 catches.) | 2012–2017 | 22 | 63 | 11 | 74 |
| 33 | Peter Nevill | 2015–2016 | 17 | 61 | 2 | 63 |
| 34 | Alex Carey | 2021–present | 53 | 201 | 20 | 221 |

Statistics are correct as of 1 November 2026.

== See also ==
- List of Australian Test cricketers
- List of Australia ODI wicket-keepers
- List of Australia T20I wicket-keepers
