= International cricket in 1978–79 =

International cricket season

The 1978–79 international cricket season was from September 1978 to April 1979.

== Season overview ==
International tours
Start date	Home team	Away team	Results [Matches]			
Start date	Home team	Away team	Test	ODI	FC	LA
1 October 1978	Pakistan	India	2–0 [3]	2–1 [3]	—	—
1 December 1978	Australia	England	1–5 [6]	2–1 [5]	—	—
1 December 1978	India	West Indies	1–0 [6]	—	—	—
2 February 1979	New Zealand	Pakistan	0–1 [3]	—	—	—
10 March 1979	Australia	Pakistan	1–1 [2]	—	—	—

== October ==
=== India in Pakistan ===
ODI series
No.	Date	Home captain	Away captain	Venue	Result
ODI 54	1 October	Mushtaq Mohammad	Bishan Singh Bedi	Ayub National Stadium, Quetta	India by 4 runs
ODI 55	13 October	Mushtaq Mohammad	Bishan Singh Bedi	Jinnah Stadium, Sialkot	Pakistan by 8 wickets
ODI 56	3 November	Mushtaq Mohammad	Bishan Singh Bedi	Zafar Ali Stadium, Sahiwal	Pakistan by a concession (opposition conceded)
Test series
No.	Date	Home captain	Away captain	Venue	Result
Test 831	16–21 October	Mushtaq Mohammad	Bishan Singh Bedi	Iqbal Stadium, Faisalabad	Match drawn
Test 832	27 Oct–1 November	Mushtaq Mohammad	Bishan Singh Bedi	Gaddafi Stadium, Lahore	Pakistan by 8 wickets
Test 833	14–19 November	Mushtaq Mohammad	Bishan Singh Bedi	National Stadium, Karachi	Pakistan by 8 wickets

== December ==
=== England in Australia ===
The Ashes Test Series
No.	Date	Home captain	Away captain	Venue	Result
Test 834	1–6 December	Graham Yallop	Mike Brearley	The Gabba, Brisbane	England by 7 wickets
Test 836	15–20 December	Graham Yallop	Mike Brearley	WACA Ground, Perth	England by 166 runs
Test 838	29 Dec–3 January	Graham Yallop	Mike Brearley	Melbourne Cricket Ground, Melbourne	Australia by 103 runs
Test 840	6–11 January	Graham Yallop	Mike Brearley	Sydney Cricket Ground, Sydney	England by 93 runs
Test 843	27 Jan–1 February	Graham Yallop	Mike Brearley	Adelaide Oval, Adelaide	England by 205 runs
Test 846	10–14 February	Graham Yallop	Mike Brearley	Sydney Cricket Ground, Sydney	England by 9 wickets
ODI Series
No.	Date	Home captain	Away captain	Venue	Result
ODI 56a	26 December	Graham Yallop	Mike Brearley	Melbourne Cricket Ground, Melbourne	Match abandoned
ODI 57	13 January	Graham Yallop	Mike Brearley	Sydney Cricket Ground, Sydney	No result
ODI 58	24 January	Graham Yallop	Mike Brearley	Melbourne Cricket Ground, Melbourne	England by 7 wickets
ODI 59	4 February	Graham Yallop	Mike Brearley	Melbourne Cricket Ground, Melbourne	Australia by 4 wickets
ODI 60	7 February	Graham Yallop	Mike Brearley	Melbourne Cricket Ground, Melbourne	Australia by 6 wickets

=== West Indies in India ===
Test series
No.	Date	Home captain	Away captain	Venue	Result
Test 835	1–6 December	Sunil Gavaskar	Alvin Kallicharran	Wankhede Stadium, Bombay	Match drawn
Test 837	15–20 December	Sunil Gavaskar	Alvin Kallicharran	Karnataka State Cricket Association Stadium, Bangalore	Match drawn
Test 839	29 Dec–3 January	Sunil Gavaskar	Alvin Kallicharran	Eden Gardens, Calcutta	Match drawn
Test 841	12–16 January	Sunil Gavaskar	Alvin Kallicharran	MA Chidambaram Stadium, Madras	India by 3 wickets
Test 842	24–29 December	Sunil Gavaskar	Alvin Kallicharran	Feroz Shah Kotla Ground, Delhi	Match drawn
Test 845	2–8 February	Sunil Gavaskar	Alvin Kallicharran	Green Park Stadium, Kanpur	Match drawn

== February ==
=== Pakistan in New Zealand ===
Test Series
No.	Date	Home captain	Away captain	Venue	Result
Test 844	2–7 February	Mark Burgess	Mushtaq Mohammad	AMI Stadium, Christchurch	Pakistan by 128 runs
Test 847	16–21 February	Mark Burgess	Mushtaq Mohammad	McLean Park, Napier	Match drawn
Test 848	23–28 February	Mark Burgess	Mushtaq Mohammad	Eden Park, Auckland	Match drawn

== March ==
=== Pakistan in Australia ===
Test Series
No.	Date	Home captain	Away captain	Venue	Result
Test 849	10–15 March	Graham Yallop	Mushtaq Mohammad	Melbourne Cricket Ground, Melbourne	Pakistan by 71 runs
Test 850	24–29 March	Kim Hughes	Mushtaq Mohammad	WACA Ground, Perth	Australia by 7 wickets
