= Follow-on =

Law in cricket

In cricket, a team who batted second and scored significantly fewer runs than the team who batted first may be forced to follow-on: to take their second innings immediately after their first. The follow-on can be enforced by the team who batted first, and is intended to reduce the probability of a drawn result, by allowing the second team's second innings to be completed sooner and to avoid a team who were significantly better in their first innings from having to declare their second innings closed so they can attempt to win the match, giving the inferior team an undeserved advantage.

Normal sequence		Follow-on sequence	
1.	Team A's first innings	1.	Team A's first innings
2.	Team B's first innings	2.	Team B's first innings
3.	Team A's second innings	3.	Team B's second innings
4.	Team B's second innings (if required)	4.	Team A's second innings (if required)

The follow-on occurs only in those forms of cricket where each team normally bats twice: notably in domestic first class cricket and international Test cricket. In these forms of cricket, a team cannot win a match unless at least three innings have been completed. If fewer than three innings are completed by the scheduled end of play, the result of the match can only be a draw.

The decision to enforce the follow-on is made by the captain of the team who batted first, who considers the score, the apparent strength of the two sides, the conditions of weather and the pitch, and the time remaining.

The rules governing the circumstances in which the follow-on may be enforced are found in Law 14 of the Laws of Cricket.

== Example ==
During the India national cricket team's 2017 tour of Sri Lanka, in the Second Test, India won the toss and batted first. Sri Lanka batted second, failed to score within 200 runs of India's first innings score, and were forced to follow-on. India won the match by an innings and 53 runs.

1. India scored 622/9, dec
2. Sri Lanka scored 183, all out
3. Sri Lanka scored 386, all out

This contrasts with the order of innings batted in the First Test of the same series, where Indian captain Virat Kohli had the right to enforce the follow-on, but declined. India won the match by 304 runs.

1. India scored 600
2. Sri Lanka scored 291, all out
3. India scored 240/3, dec
4. Sri Lanka scored 245, all out

== Minimum lead ==
Law 14 of the Laws of Cricket considers the length of the match in defining the minimum lead required for the defending team to enforce the follow-on:

- In a match of five days or more, a side which bats first and leads by at least 200 runs has the option of requiring the other side to follow-on. (Note: For matches having provisions of a reserve day, this law states that the first innings lead of at least 200 runs for the follow-on will only change to 150 runs if no play takes place on the first and second days of the match, since it will be a five-day match even if the first day is lost.)
- In a match of three or four days, a lead of at least 150 runs.
- In a match of two days, a lead of at least 100 runs.
- In a one-day match, a lead of at least 75 runs.

When the start of a match is delayed by one or more full days, e.g., due to bad weather, the score lead required to enforce the follow-on is reduced accordingly. However, when a match duration is shortened after it has started, the score lead required to enforce the follow-on remains unchanged.

== Enforcement ==
The follow-on is not automatic; the captain of the leading team decides whether to enforce it. Conventional theory suggests the follow-on is almost always enforced. In his classic text The Art of Captaincy, Mike Brearley deals with the issue in a single paragraph, and finds the advantages overwhelming.

1. The main reason to enforce the follow-on is to prevent a draw. Batting last, the chasing side can bat cautiously and use up time to draw the match rather than lose, and the follow-on gives them more time, making that strategy more difficult.
2. Enforcing the follow-on can also increase the pressure on the chasing team, since they have already posted an inferior score, and the state of the pitch often deteriorates as a match progresses.

However, there are several reasons for not enforcing the follow-on:

1. Most simply, it is tiring for bowlers to bowl for two consecutive innings, and it can be more difficult to dismiss a team in their second innings than it was in their first innings. During the first test of the 1958 series between Pakistan and West Indies on 17–23 January, West Indies batting first declared at 579/9 and Pakistan replied with 106 all out. After Pakistan was asked to follow-on on the third day of the six-day match, Mohammed Hanif held his ground for 970 minutes, scoring 337 runs, forcing a draw.
2. Declining to enforce the follow-on reduces the defending team's probability of losing. Already with a substantial lead in the first innings, the defending team can score enough runs and/or use up enough time to give the chasing team no chance of victory. This does increase the probability of a drawn result, but it can also demotivate the chasing team who have nothing to play for.
3. Refusing to enforce the follow-on can be a strategic decision based on the current situation of a multi-game series such as The Ashes. A team who only needs a draw to achieve their series goal may refuse to enforce the follow-on so they can bat out the remaining time when a draw is sufficient to win or retain the series trophy. This can happen when a team is leading the series by the number of games left to play including the current game, e.g. leading an Ashes series by one win during the fifth and final game of a series.
4. It is usually a disadvantage to bat last, when the pitch has deteriorated and favours spin bowling.

In recent years there has perhaps been a trend against enforcing the follow-on in Test cricket: former England captain Andrew Strauss on several occasions took his second innings straight away. It has, though, had some notable successes, for instance at Lord's in the 2009 Ashes series. Here, Australia were 210 behind on first innings but did not follow on; England batted again, set Australia a highly unlikely victory target of 522, and won the game easily. For their part, Australian captains Steve Waugh and Ricky Ponting were also notably reluctant to enforce the follow-on, although that was perhaps more to do with wanting to allow Shane Warne to bowl on a deteriorating pitch later in the game. Michael Clarke only enforced the follow-on once in his career as a captain (during his final match in the 2015 Ashes), even when holding a substantial first innings lead due to the risk of tiring his fast bowlers.

== Victories by sides not made to follow on ==
=== Test matches ===
South Africa v Australia, Kingsmead, 1950

In a four-day Test (with one rest day in the middle of the match), South Africa won the toss, chose to bat, and posted 311. The offspinner Hugh Tayfield took 7–23, helping to bundle out Australia for 75, giving South Africa a first-innings lead of 236. South African captain Dudley Nourse elected not to enforce the follow-on owing to forecasts of rain, but in their second innings South Africa folded for 99. Thanks largely to an unbeaten 151 from Neil Harvey, Australia made 336 in 123.6 overs to win by 5 wickets.

ICC Intercontinental Cup, Afghanistan v Canada, Sharjah, 2010

Canada won the toss and chose to bat, scoring 566 in their first innings and bowling out Afghanistan for 264 in reply, giving Canada a first-innings lead of 302 runs. Wicketkeeper-captain Ashish Bagai, who retired hurt in Canada's second innings, declared with Canada on 191–4 after 40 overs to set Afghanistan a target of 494. The wicketkeeper Mohammad Shahzad made 214* as Afghanistan scored 494–4 to win by 6 wickets.

=== First-class matches ===
Irani Cup, Rest of India v Mumbai, 2016

Mumbai won the toss and chose to bat, scoring 603 in their first innings and bowling out Rest of India for 306. This gave Mumbai a first-innings lead of 297 runs. However, they declined to enforce the follow on, and were bowled out for 182 in their second innings. Rest of India, set 479 to win, chased down the total with 4 wickets to spare. Faiz Fazal, the opener for Rest of India, made 127 in the winning effort.

== Victories by sides following-on ==
=== Test matches ===
There have been only four occasions in Test cricket where a team that was forced to follow-on won the match. Australia lost the first three of these matches. New Zealand defeated England in the fourth.

==== 1894–95 Ashes ====
In the first innings of the First Test at Sydney, Australia had scored a massive 586 (Syd Gregory 201, George Giffen 161) and then dismissed England for 325. England responded with 437, leaving them ahead by 176. However, at stumps on the fourth day, Australia were 113 for 2 and looked to be the winners. But heavy rain fell overnight (in this era, pitches were not covered between days of play), and the next morning, England's slow left-arm bowlers, Bobby Peel and Johnny Briggs, were unplayable on the sticky wicket. England dismissed Australia for 166, winning by 10 runs, and went on to win the series 3–2.

==== Botham's Test: England v Australia, Headingley, 1981 ====
In 1981, England's Ian Botham was performing poorly as captain against the touring Australians. The Australian team was rated as second only to the great West Indies team of the time, and contained a formidable pace attack in the form of Dennis Lillee, Terry Alderman and Geoff Lawson. After a loss and a draw in the first two Test matches of the summer's six-test Ashes series, Botham resigned the captaincy.

Mike Brearley, the captain Botham had replaced, resumed the reins for the third Test, at Headingley. This started out very badly: Australia scored 401 (John Dyson 102; Kim Hughes 89; but Botham took 6–95), and asked England to follow on after bowling them out for 174 (Lillee took 4–49; Lawson 3–32). The one bright point in the innings came from Botham, who top scored with 50 (his first fifty since he had been made captain 13 matches earlier). In the second innings, Botham came to the crease with England on 105 for 5, still 126 behind. Matters did not improve: Geoffrey Boycott and Bob Taylor soon followed, and with England 135 for 7 and still 92 runs behind an innings defeat looked likely.

By all accounts, everyone on both sides thought the game was lost. Ladbrokes famously offered 500–1 against England winning. When Graham Dilley joined him at the crease, Botham reportedly said, "Right then, let's have a bit of fun." Botham, with able support from the lower order, went on to make 149 not out, and gave England a slender lead of 129. The next day a fired-up Bob Willis took 8 for 43, and Australia slumped to 111 all out.

==== India v Australia, Eden Gardens, 2001 ====
Australia, who had won their 16 previous Test matches, including the first of the three-Test series between the two teams, had scored 445 in the first innings of the second Test and restricted India to 171; only V. V. S. Laxman (59) and Rahul Dravid reached 25 runs. The only other bright spot for India was the bowling of Harbhajan Singh, who took 7 for 123, including a hat-trick (Ricky Ponting, Adam Gilchrist, Shane Warne). Australia then enforced the follow-on.

Laxman came to the crease just before the end of Day 3 and proceeded to change the course of both the match and the series by hitting 281, at that time the record for an Indian Test batsman. He did most of his damage partnered with Dravid, who hit 180; the two were at the crease for the entire fourth day. India progressed to 657/7 in their second innings (a lead of 383), declared shortly before lunch on the final day (giving Australia insufficient time to reach the total, thus securing at least a draw). By tea, Australia had scored 161/3, and a draw appeared the most likely result. Then, within minutes, Australia lost five wickets for 8 runs in a span of 31 balls. Harbhajan took the first two wickets in the same over, followed quickly by three wickets from Sachin Tendulkar. Australia proceeded to fall for 212 in the second innings and India won the match. Despite Harbhajan's prodigious bowling—6 for 73 to go with his seven-wicket haul from the first innings—Laxman was named man of the match. India's 171-run victory was by far the largest of the four Test victories by the team following on (both of England's winning margins had been fewer than 20 runs), and it was the only time in history that a side has been able to declare the follow-on innings and still win. India under the captaincy of Sourav Ganguly went on to win the 3rd test, and hence the series, with Laxman contributing half-centuries in both innings and Harbhajan, who was named as man of the series for taking 32 wickets.

==== New Zealand v England, Wellington, 2023 ====
New Zealand became only the third team in history to win a Test after following on, winning by one run after wrestling the game away from England on a dramatic final day in Wellington. Neil Wagner was the catalyst with a short-ball assault during the afternoon session, and he capped the comeback by taking the final wicket amid rising tension at Basin Reserve. England declared at 435/8 in their first innings with Joe Root and Harry Brook scoring 150+ each. New Zealand's first innings ended at 209 with a rear guard action from Tom Blundell and Captain Tim Southee limiting the damage to a 226 run deficit. Following on, New Zealand scored a mammoth 483 in 162 overs, with 4 half-centuries and a Kane Williamson 132, leaving England with a target of 258. England had trouble putting together a significant partnership, and when Ben Foakes departed at 251/9, the tailenders Jack Leach and James Anderson could only add 5 more runs before Anderson glanced a leg side delivery through to the keeper to lose the game. Controversially, the ball prior should have been called a wide, as a bouncer flew well over the batsman's head, and one run extra could have potentially seen the match end as the third ever tied Test.

=== First-class matches ===
==== 22-24 July 1847 match between MCC and Surrey ====
In 1847 at The Oval, the MCC were bowled out for 91 in reply to Surrey's 197 in a three-day match. Under the Laws in force, the MCC were required to follow-on, and scored 216 before bowling Surrey out for 101 to win by nine runs. This was the first occasion in first-class cricket of victory by a team following-on.

==== County Championship – Warwickshire v Hampshire, 1922 ====
In 1922 at Edgbaston, Hampshire were bowled out for 15 in just 53 balls and 40 minutes in reply to Warwickshire's 223 in a three-day match; Hampshire's total is the seventh-lowest score for a completed first-class innings. After Warwickshire enforced the follow-on, Hampshire famously scored a mammoth 521 before bowling Warwickshire out for 158 to win by 155 runs. Hampshire's first innings total of 15 remains the lowest score in the county's history, and the lowest for a completed innings by a team that won the match as of 2022.

== History ==
- 1744: No provision existed.
- 1787: First known instance; at that time, it was the custom for any side behind on first innings to bat again regardless of the deficit (follow-on in the case of the side batting second).
- 1835: Added to Laws, made compulsory after a deficit of 100 runs.
- 1854: Compulsory after a deficit of 80 runs.
- 1894: Compulsory after a deficit of 120 runs.
- 1900: Made optional after a deficit of 150 runs in a three-day match, 100 runs in a two-day match, and 75 runs in a one-day match.
- 1946: Experimental Law allowed declaration on the first day after batting side had scored 300.
- 1951: A side could declare at any time.
- 1957: Above made Law. Declarations were not to be made as a result of agreement with the opposing captain.
- 1961: In abeyance in the County Championship, but restored in 1963.
- 1980: Optional after a deficit of 200 runs in a five-day match, 150 runs in a three- or four-day match, 100 runs in a two-day match, and 75 runs in a one-day match.

== In other sports ==
Some informal baseball games use variations of the follow-on.

== Bibliography ==
- Birley, Derek (1999). A Social History of English Cricket. London: Aurum Press. ISBN 1-85410-941-3.
- Brodribb, Gerald (1995). Next Man In: A Survey of Cricket Laws and Customs. London: Souvenir Press. ISBN 0-285-63294-9.
