= Lambs to the Slaughter =

1979 memoir by Graham Yallop and Rod Nicholson

- First edition
- Author: Graham Yallop; Rod Nicholson
- Language: English
- Genre: cricket memoir
- Publisher: Outback Press
- Publication date: 1979
- Publication place: Australia

Lambs to the Slaughter is a 1979 memoir by Australian cricketer Graham Yallop, ghost written by Rod Nicholson. Although it covers Yallop's career until that date, it focuses on the Australian summer of 1978-79 when Yallop led the Australian test team to a 5-1 defeat against England and a defeat against Pakistan.

In the words of one writer, "On the very first page of Lambs To The Slaughter, his 1979 account of his captaincy nightmare, Yallop gallantly announced: "I should be bitter, but I am not." He fooled nobody. The subsequent chapter headings - "Sacked", "The First Killing", "Skinned Alive", "Slaughtered" - gave the game away, hinting at the anger and hurt he must really have felt."

The book was written by Melbourne sports journalist Rod Nicholson at the end of the 1978-79 summer, just before Yallop was sacked as Australian captain in favour of Kim Hughes for the 1979 World Cup.

In April 1979, a month prior to scheduled publication of the book, extracts of it were published in the Melbourne Herald where "Yallop" criticized the behavior of Australian fast bowler Rodney Hogg. Hogg became upset at some of the comments and complained. Yallop said he did not write the book, had not read the manuscript yet or given permission for extracts to be published. Yallop wanted the chapter on Hogg rewritten but the publisher, Outback Press, refused, saying the book was being printed and readied for sale in May. Yallop applied for an injunction in the Supreme Court of Victoria to stop the book being published. The parties ultimately settled out of court and publication of the book proceeded, unaltered.

The Australian Cricket Board considered taking disciplinary action against Yallop but ultimately decided not to.
