= English cricket team in Australia in 1978–79 =

Test cricket series between Australia and England

1978–79 Ashes series
- Date: 3 November 1978 – 14 February 1979
- Location: Australia
- Result: Six-match series won by England 5–1 (England retained The Ashes)
Teams
- Australia: England
Captains
- Graham Yallop: Mike Brearley
Most runs
- Graham Yallop (391) Kim Hughes (345) Graeme Wood (344): David Gower (420); Derek Randall (385); Ian Botham (291)
Most wickets
- Rodney Hogg (41) Alan Hurst (25) Jim Higgs (19): Geoff Miller (23); Ian Botham (23); Bob Willis (20)

The England cricket team toured Australia in the 1978–79 season to play a six-match Test series against Australia for The Ashes. England won the series 5–1, thereby retaining The Ashes.

This series was often over shadowed by Kerry Packer's World Series Cricket which meant many players from both sides were absent, including Greg Chappell. Australia were more handicapped which opened the way for England and their captain Mike Brearley. The side was managed by Doug Insole, Ken Barrington assistant-manager/coach and physiotherapist Bernard Thomas was given credit as the prime reason for England's supreme fitness.

== Test series summary ==
Note: Each over consists of 8 balls.

=== First Test ===
1–6 December 1978
Scorecard

Australia	v	England
116 (37.7 overs); Rodney Hogg 36 (67); Bob Willis 4/44 (14 overs)		286 (95.4 overs); Derek Randall 75 (196); Rodney Hogg 6/74 (28 overs)
339 (116.6 overs); Kim Hughes 129 (411); Bob Willis 3/69 (27.6 overs)		170/3 (53.5 overs); Derek Randall 74* (175); Rodney Hogg 1/35 (12.5 overs)

England won by 7 wickets
The Gabba, Brisbane
Umpires: RA French and MG O'Connell
Player of the match: DW Randall (Eng)

- Australia won the toss and elected to bat.
- 4 December was taken as a rest day.
- JA Maclean and RM Hogg (Aus) made their Test debut.

=== Second Test ===
15–20 December 1978
Scorecard

England	v	Australia
309 (117.5 overs); DI Gower 102 (221); RM Hogg 5/65 (30.5 overs)		190 (66.5 overs); PM Toohey 81* (184); RGD Willis 5/44 (18.5 overs)
208 (66.3 overs); DW Randall 45 (65); RM Hogg 5/57 (17 overs)		161 (46.1 overs); GM Wood 64 (168); JK Lever 4/28 (8.1 overs)

England won by 166 runs
WACA Ground, Perth
Umpires: RC Bailhache and TF Brooks
Player of the match: RM Hogg (Aus)

- Australia won the toss and elected to field.
- 18 December was taken as a rest day.

=== Third Test ===
29 December 1978 – 3 January 1979
Scorecard

Australia	v	England
258 (89.1 overs); GM Wood 100 (283); G Miller 3/35 (19 overs)		143 (63.6 overs); DI Gower 29 (48); RM Hogg 5/30 (17 overs)
167 (71.2 overs); KJ Hughes 48 (142); JE Emburey 3/30 (21.2 overs)		179 (67 overs); DI Gower 49 (128); RM Hogg 5/36 (17 overs)

Australia won by 103 runs
Melbourne Cricket Ground, Melbourne
Umpires: RA French and MG O'Connell
Player of the match: GM Wood (Aus)

- Australia won the toss and elected to bat.
- 31 December was taken as a rest day.
- AR Border made his Test debut.

=== Fourth Test ===
6–11 January 1979
Scorecard

England	v	Australia
152 (52.6 overs); IT Botham 59 (108); AG Hurst 5/28 (10.6 overs)		294 (108 overs); WM Darling 91 (200); RGD Willis 2/33 (9 overs)
346 (146.6 overs); DW Randall 150 (498); JD Higgs 5/148 (59.6 overs)		111 (49.2 overs); AR Border 45* (115); JE Emburey 4/46 (17.2 overs)

England won by 93 runs
Sydney Cricket Ground, Sydney
Umpires: RC Bailhache and RA French
Player of the match: DW Randall (Eng)

- England won the toss and elected to bat.
- 9 January was taken as a rest day.

=== Fifth Test ===
27 January – 1 February 1979
Scorecard

England	v	Australia
169 (40.4 overs); IT Botham 74 (97); RM Hogg 4/26 (10.4 overs)		164 (53.4 overs); GM Wood 35 (117); IT Botham 4/42 (11.4 overs)
360 (142.6 overs); RW Taylor 97 (300); AG Hurst 4/97 (37 overs)		160 (67 overs); KJ Hughes 46 (176); M Hendrick 3/19 (14 overs)

England won by 205 runs
Adelaide Oval, Adelaide
Umpires: RC Bailhache and MG O'Connell
Player of the match: IT Botham (Eng)

- Australia won the toss and elected to field.
- 30 January was taken as a rest day
- PH Carlson and KJ Wright (Aus) made their Test debut.

=== Sixth Test ===
10–14 February 1979
Scorecard

Australia	v	England
198 (60.7 overs); GN Yallop 121 (212); IT Botham 4/57 (9.7 overs)		308 (103 overs); GA Gooch 74 (136); JD Higgs 4/69 (30 overs)
143 (61.1 overs); B Yardley 61* (147); G Miller 5/44 (27.1 overs)		35/1 (10.2 overs); JM Brearley 20* (30); JD Higgs 1/12 (5 overs)

England won by 9 wickets
Sydney Cricket Ground, Sydney
Umpires: AR Crafter and DG Weser
Player of the match: GN Yallop (Aus)

- Australia won the toss and elected to bat.
- 13 February was taken as a rest day.
- AMJ Hilditch (Aus) made his Test debut.

== One Day Internationals (ODIs) ==
The ODI series was contested over five games, with innings of maximum 40 eight-ball overs. Australia won the series 2–1, with one match abandoned and one no result.

=== 1st ODI ===
26 December 1978
Scorecard

Australia	v	England

Match abandoned
Melbourne Cricket Ground, Melbourne

=== 2nd ODI ===
13 January 1979
Scorecard

Australia; 17/1 (7.2 overs)	v	England
Rick Darling 7* (32); Chris Old 1/5 (3.2 overs)

No result
Sydney Cricket Ground, Sydney
Umpires: Tony Crafter and Mick Harvey

- England won the toss and elected to field.
- Allan Border, Phil Carlson and John Maclean (AUS) and Roger Tolchard (ENG) made their ODI debuts.

Only 40 minutes of play were possible before rain caused the match to be called off. During the brief action, Chris Old dismissed Graeme Wood caught behind for six.

=== 3rd ODI ===
24 January 1979
Scorecard

Australia; 101 (33.5 overs)	v	England; 102/3 (28.2 overs)
Graeme Wood 28 (66); Mike Hendrick 4/25 (8 overs)		Geoffrey Boycott 39* (107); Geoff Dymock 1/16 (6 overs)

England won by 7 wickets
Melbourne Cricket Ground, Melbourne
Umpires: Tony Crafter and Mick Harvey
Player of the match: Mike Hendrick (ENG)

- Australia won the toss and elected to bat.
- Andrew Hilditch and Rodney Hogg (AUS), and David Bairstow (ENG) made their ODI debuts.

Australia chose to bat first on a pitch of variable bounce, but from a position of 52 for two then collapsed to be all out for 101, with Man of the Match Mike Hendrick claiming 4/25 and Ian Botham 3/16. England reached the required target for the loss of only three wickets and with more than ten overs to spare; Mike Brearley fell early, bowled for a duck by Rodney Hogg, but Geoff Boycott anchored the innings with a patient 39 not out off 107 balls.

=== 4th ODI ===
4 February 1979
Scorecard

England; 212/6 (40 overs)	v	Australia; 215/6 (38.6 overs)
DI Gower 101* (100); G Dymock 2/31 (8 overs)		PM Toohey 54* (55); JK Lever 3/51 (7 overs)

Australia won by 4 wickets
Melbourne Cricket Ground, Melbourne
Umpires: RC Bailhache and DG Weser
Player of the match: DI Gower (ENG)

- Australia won the toss and elected to field.
- KJ Wright (AUS) made his ODI debut.

=== 5th ODI ===
7 February 1979
Scorecard

England; 94 (31.7 overs)	v	Australia; 95/4 (21.5 overs)
JM Brearley 46 (112); GJ Cosier 3/22 (7 overs)		GM Wood 30 (38); RGD Willis 2/16 (5 overs)

Australia won by 6 wickets
Melbourne Cricket Ground, Melbourne
Umpires: RC Bailhache and DG Weser
Player of the match: G Dymock (AUS)

- Australia won the toss and elected to field.

== Annual reviews ==
- Playfair Cricket Annual 1979
- Wisden Cricketers' Almanack 1980
