= International cricket in 1977 =

International cricket season

The 1977 International cricket season was from May 1977 to August 1977.

== Season overview ==
International tours
Start date	Home team	Away team	Results [Matches]			
Start date	Home team	Away team	Test	ODI	FC	LA
2 June 1977	England	Australia	3–0 [5]	2–1 [3]	—	—

== June ==
=== Australia in England ===
Prudential Trophy ODI series
No.	Date	Home captain	Away captain	Venue	Result
ODI 42	2 June	Mike Brearley	Greg Chappell	Old Trafford Cricket Ground, Manchester	England by 2 wickets
ODI 43	4 June	Mike Brearley	Greg Chappell	Edgbaston Cricket Ground, Birmingham	England by 101 runs
ODI 44	6 June	Mike Brearley	Greg Chappell	Kennington Oval, London	Australia by 2 wickets
The Ashes Test series
No.	Date	Home captain	Away captain	Venue	Result
Test 804	16–21 June	Mike Brearley	Greg Chappell	Lord's, London	Match drawn
Test 805	7–12 July	Mike Brearley	Greg Chappell	Old Trafford Cricket Ground, Manchester	England by 9 wickets
Test 806	28 Jul–2 August	Mike Brearley	Greg Chappell	Trent Bridge, Nottingham	England by 7 wickets
Test 807	11–15 August	Mike Brearley	Greg Chappell	Headingley, Leeds	England by an innings and 85 runs
Test 808	25–30 August	Mike Brearley	Greg Chappell	Kennington Oval, London	Match drawn
