= 1978 Ashes series =

1978 Ashes series may refer to:

- The Ashes series contested whilst the English cricket team in Australia in 1978–79
- The Ashes series contested during the 1978 Kangaroo tour of Great Britain and France
