= Horace Brearley =

English cricketer and schoolmaster

Horace Brearley (26 June 1913 – 14 August 2007) was an English cricketer and schoolmaster.

Born in Heckmondwike, Yorkshire, England, Brearley represented Yorkshire for a solitary County Championship appearance as a right-handed batsman in 1937, and played for Middlesex in 1949. His appearance with Yorkshire yielded seventeen runs from two innings. He also played for Yorkshire Men's Hockey team whilst in Sheffield.

After obtaining a B.Sc. from the University of Leeds, he was a teacher at King Edward VII School in Sheffield from 1937 to 1946, interrupted by wartime service as Instructor Lieutenant in the R.N.V.R. He left Sheffield in 1946, to take up a teaching post at the City of London School. He suffered from Alzheimer's disease in his last years.

His son, Mike Brearley, captained both Middlesex and England at cricket.
