= List of Australia Twenty20 International wicket-keepers =

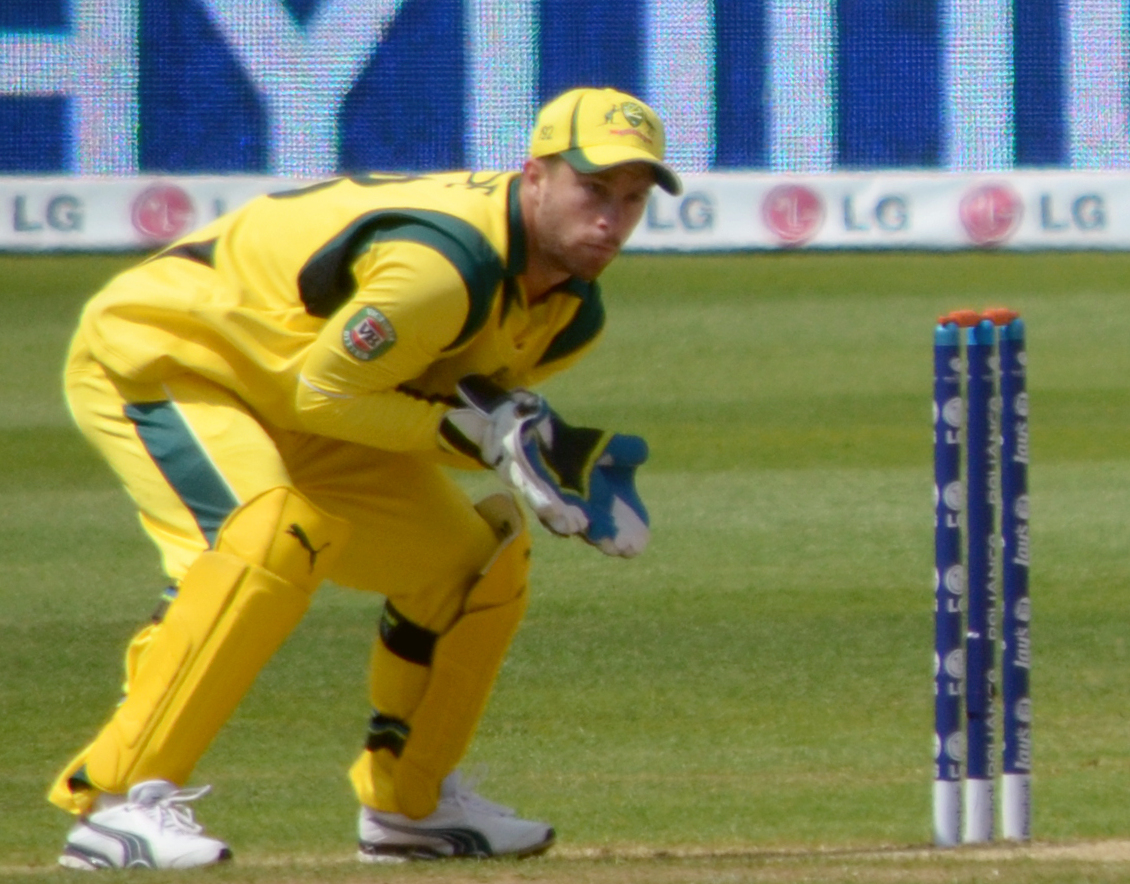
Matthew Wade, Australia's longest serving T20I wicket-keeper

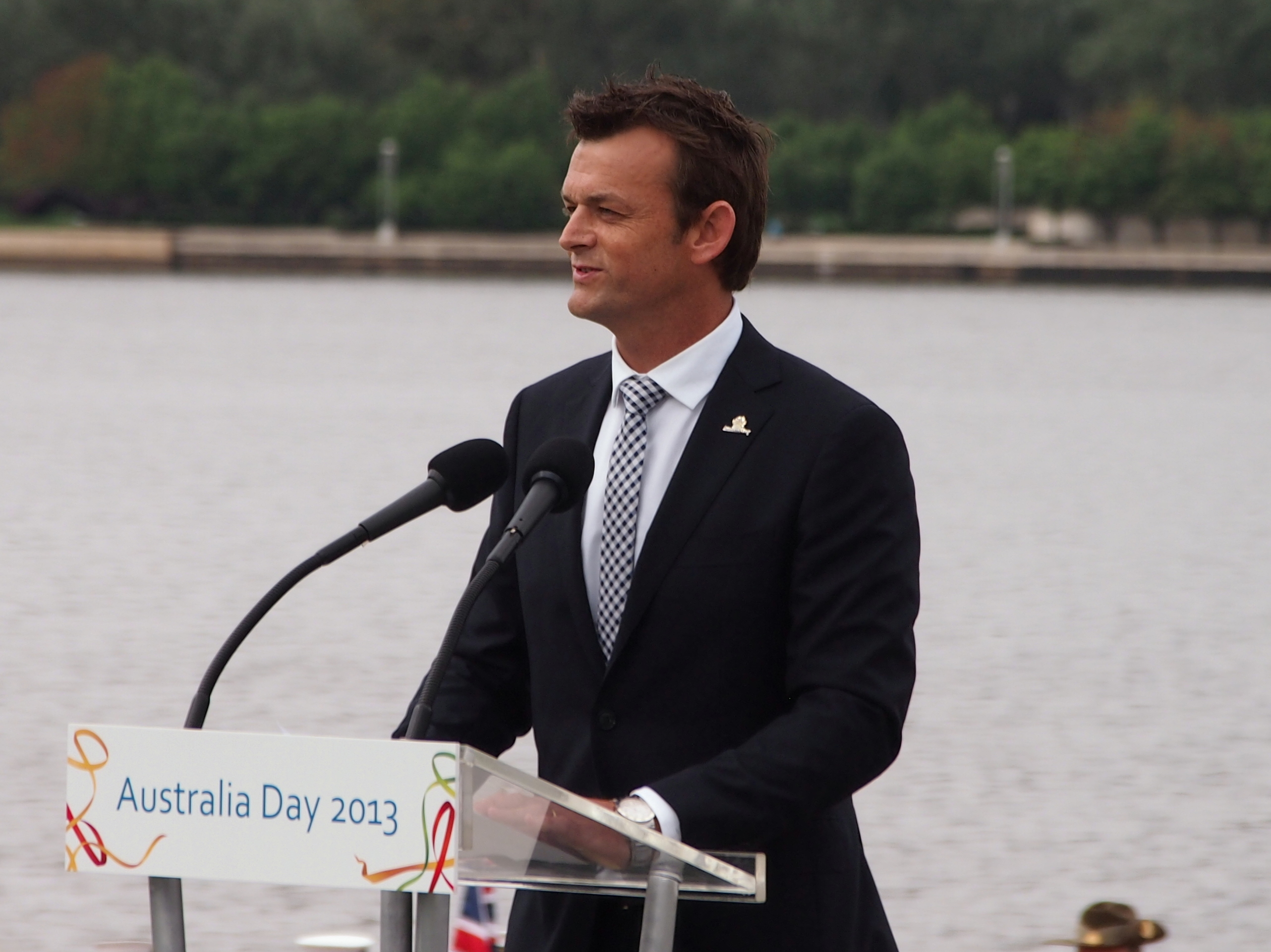
Australia's first T20I wicket-keeper, Adam Gilchrist

This is a chronological list of Australia T20Is wicket-keepers.

This list only includes players who have played as the designated keeper for a match. On occasions, another player may have stepped in to relieve the primary wicket-keeper due to injury or the keeper bowling.

Statistics are correct as of 21 November 2026.

No.	Player	Span	T20Is	Catches	Stumpings	Total dismissals
1	Adam Gilchrist	2005–2008	13	17	0	17
2	Brad Haddin	2006–2014	31	17	6	23
3	Luke Ronchi	2008–2009	3	0	0	0
4	Tim Paine	2009–2017	10	10	2	12
5	Matthew Wade	2011–2024	88	58	6	64
6	Ben Dunk	2014	3	4	2	6
7	Cameron Bancroft	2016	1	1	0	1
8	Peter Nevill	2016	9	2	1	3
9	Alex Carey	2018–2025	34	17	10	27
10	Peter Handscomb	2019	2	0	0	0
11	Josh Inglis	2022–2026	35	25	3	28
12	Josh Philippe	2026	2	1	0	1
13	Sam Harper	2026	1	1	0	1

== See also ==
- List of Australia Twenty20 International cricketers
- List of Australia ODI wicket-keepers
- List of Australia Test wicket-keepers
