= Kevin Wright (cricketer) =

Australian cricketer (born 1953)

Personal information
- Full name: Kevin John Wright
- Born: 27 December 1953 (age 72); North Fremantle, Western Australia
- Batting: Right-handed
- Role: Wicket-keeper

International information
- National side: Australia
- Test debut (cap 301): 27 January 1979 v England
- Last Test: 3 November 1979 v India
- ODI debut (cap 54): 4 February 1979 v England
- Last ODI: 16 June 1979 v Canada

Domestic team information
- Years: Team
- 1974/75–1979/80: Western Australia
- 1980/81–1983/84: South Australia

Career statistics
Competition	Test	ODI	FC	LA
Matches	10	5	85	20
Runs scored	219	29	2,551	136
Batting average	16.85	14.50	26.85	17.00
100s/50s	0/1	0/0	2/11	0/0
Top score	55*	23	105	23
Catches/stumpings	31/4	8/0	269/25	24/3
- Source: Archive, 16 October 2013

Kevin John Wright (born 27 December 1953) is an Australian former Test cricketer.

Wright played as a wicket-keeper, making 10 Test and five One Day International appearances for Australia in 1979 during the World Series Cricket era. He replaced John Maclean after the Fourth Test in the 1978–79 Ashes series, and played the last two Tests of that series, both against Pakistan in Australia shortly afterwards, and all six Tests in India in late 1979, playing all his 10 Tests inside 10 months.

After World Series Cricket ended, he lost his place in the Australian and Western Australian teams to Rod Marsh. He moved to South Australia to continue his first-class career. When Wayne Phillips became South Australia's wicket-keeper in 1984, Wright retired from first-class cricket and moved to Sydney, taking up the position of Eagle Insurance's life division manager for New South Wales. In his last match for South Australia he captained them to victory in the McDonald's Cup limited-overs cricket final in 1983–84.

== Career ==
Wright grew up in West Australia where Rod Marsh was the established keeper. He made his first class debut in 1974/75 against the touring English side. He also managed to play several games for WA during the 1976/77 season when Marsh was touring New Zealand for Australia.

When Rod Marsh joined World Series Cricket, he was banned from playing first class cricket in Australia. Wright got the chance to establish himself as West Australia's regular keeper in the 1977/78 season. It was a successful one for WA, as they won the Sheffield Shield. Wright scored 211 runs at an average of 35 with a top score of 59.

=== Test Debut against England ===
Steve Rixon was Australia's wicketkeeper during the 1977–78 season against India and on the tour of the West Indies. In 1978-79 he was replaced by John Maclean.

After four tests, Maclean fell injured and Wright was picked to take his place for the 5th test. At that stage he had made 83 dismissals.

Wright scored 29 (Australia's second highest score in the first innings) and 0. Wright kept his spot for the two on day games against England which followed (which Australia won), and sixth test, scoring 3 and 5 in another Australian defeat.

=== Tests vs Pakistan ===
He was kept as keeper for the next two tests against Pakistan. In the first, Wright took seven dismissals and scored 9 and 1 with the bat.

In the second, he took seven dismissals and scored 16 in a then-rare Australian victory.

Wright scored 300 first class runs that summer at an average of 17 but he took 57 dismissals (53 caught, 4 stumping).

=== 1979 World Cup and Tour of India ===
Wright kept his spot for the 1979 tours of England for the World Cup, and the six-test series in India.

In the World Cup Wright scored 6 against England, 23 against Pakistan and did not bat against Canada.

In India he scored 52 in an opening tour game. He made 20 and 5 in the first test, disappointing captain Kim Hughes. He made a fighting 16 in the second test, 6 and 11 in the third, a much-praised double of 55 and 15 in the fourth, 0 and 12 in the fifth and 11 and 5 in the 6th.

=== Post WSC ===
On Wright's return to Australia, the World Series players had been re-incorporated with the establishment. Wright lost his spot in the West Australian and Australian teams to Rod Marsh. Marsh's absence on international duty however meant he still played eight first class games scoring 322 runs at 35 (top score 88) and taking 34 dismissals. He won a man of the match award for A Shield game against Tasmania taking seven dismissals and scoring 55. The Australian selectors however named Victoria Richie Robinson as the back up keeper for Marsh on the 1980 tour of Pakistan.

In 1980-81 Wright moved to South Australia. He scored 399 runs at 28 including his first first-class century, 105, and took 27 dismissals. However, on the 1981 Ashes he was overlooked for selection as the second keeper in favour of Steve Rixon.

Wright won a Sheffield Shield with South Australia in 1981–82. He had a great season, his best with the bat (392 runs at 39.2 including a top score of 104 not out, 32 dismissals) and stayed with them for two more seasons. In 1982-83 he made 455 runs at 30.33 and the following season 164 runs at 16.40. He also captained the side in the absence of David Hookes. South Australia had a disappointing Shield season in 1983-84 but Wright led the team to victory in the McDonalds Cup.

In 1983-84 South Australian batsman Wayne Phillips was made wicketkeeper for South Australia in some one day games. In early 1984 Phillips became Australia's test wicketkeeper during the tour of the West Indies. Initially South Australia said that Wright would be keeper and vice captain the state side during the 1984–85 season, prompting Phillips to consider a move to WA. However, in September Wright retired from first class cricket.
