= The Art of Captaincy =

1985 book about cricket by Mike Brearley

- Author: Mike Brearley
- Language: English
- Publisher: Hodder and Stoughton Ltd
- Publication date: 1985
- Publication place: United Kingdom
- ISBN: 0340270861

The Art of Captaincy (ISBN 0340270861) is a book written by former cricketer Mike Brearley, first published in 1985 by Hodder and Stoughton Ltd. The book draws on his various experiences while captaining Middlesex and later leading England to the famous Ashes victory in 1981. Being the only cricket book which talks about and explores the various challenges a cricket team captain must surmount, it has often been referred to as a "treatise on captaincy".

Eurosport cricket commentator Luca Tramontin reviewed it, saying "though a cricket book, it helps understand and solve any work or human issue where a group is involved".

== Bibliography ==
- Brearley, Mike (2001). The Art Of Captaincy. Channel 4. pp. 242–243. ISBN 0340270861.
- Nicholas, Mark (13 December 2001). "Hussain's style has the Brearley touch". The Daily Telegraph. London.
- McConnell, Lynn (14 May 1999). "Why white is the thing for swing". The Guardian. London.
- Scott, Les (2011). Bats, Balls & Bails: The Essential Cricket Book. Random House. p. 14. ISBN 978-1-446-42316-5.
- "Leading, by the book". Cricinfo. 15 March 2008.
