= Graham Yallop =

Australian cricketer

Personal information
- Full name: Graham Neil Yallop
- Born: 7 October 1952 (age 74); Balwyn, Victoria, Australia
- Nickname: Wally
- Height: 1.82 m (6 ft 0 in)
- Batting: Left-handed
- Bowling: Left-arm medium
- Role: Top-order batter

International information
- National side: Australia
- Test debut (cap 275): 3 January 1976 v West Indies
- Last Test: 12 November 1984 v West Indies
- ODI debut (cap 47): 22 February 1978 v West Indies
- Last ODI: 6 October 1984 v India

Domestic team information
- Years: Team
- 1972/73–1984/85: Victoria

Career statistics
Competition	Test	ODI	FC	LA
Matches	39	30	164	73
Runs scored	2,756	823	11,615	1,752
Batting average	41.13	39.19	45.90	30.73
100s/50s	8/9	0/7	30/57	0/12
Top score	268	66*	268	91
Balls bowled	192	138	1,514	406
Wickets	1	3	14	6
Bowling average	116.00	39.66	62.57	56.33
5 wickets in innings	0	0	0	0
10 wickets in match	0	0	0	0
Best bowling	1/21	2/28	4/63	2/28
Catches/stumpings	23/–	5/–	132/1	9/0
- Source: CricketArchive, 9 March 2008

Graham Neil Yallop (born 7 October 1952) is a former Australian international cricketer. Yallop played Test and One Day International cricket for the Australia national cricket team between 1976 and 1984, captaining the team briefly during the World Series Cricket era in the late 1970s. A technically correct left-handed batsman, Yallop played domestically for Victoria, invariably batting near the top of the order and led Victoria to two Sheffield Shield titles. He was the first player to wear a full helmet in a Test match.

== Early life ==
Yallop was born at Balwyn, Victoria in 1952 and played for Richmond age-group teams in the Dowling Shield during the late 1960s. In the summer of 1970/71, he made his grade cricket debut for the club, as well as playing in several games for the Victorian Schools Team at the Australian Schoolboys Cricket Championships. He later reflected, "When we were playing under-16 cricket in Victoria, you're playing against the best under-16 players in the state. So that prepared you for your future in Premier Cricket, I thought that was a very good grounding."

Initially more of a bowler, Yallop's coach at Richmond was former England international Frank Tyson, who had emigrated to Australia. "He helped me enormously" Yallop later wrote; "in those days, I was more a bowler than a batsman, and he turned me around. He worked with me for quite a few years to get me up to speed with my batting." In early 1971 Yallop toured Sri Lanka in an Australian Schoolboys team; he averaged 67.75 runs per innings in the three schoolboy internationals, the best of any Australian batsman.

== Domestic debut ==
Yallop made his senior cricket debut for Victoria in December 1972, scoring a half-century on debut against New South Wales. Although he spent most of the season as 12th man in the Victoria team, he scored a second half-century against Western Australia.

In 1973 Yallop played for Walsall in the Birmingham League. He also played some games for the Marylebone Cricket Club.

Yallop did not play first-class cricket during the 1973–74 season, but returned to the Victoria team during the 1974–75 summer. He made his List A cricket debut in the Gillette Cup and scored 538 first-class runs during the season at an average of 38.28 runs per innings. These included scores of 34 and 30 against the touring England team and his debut first class century (100 not out) against South Australia.

In 1975 Yallop again played league cricket in England, scoring more than 3,000 runs for North Birmingham. In 22 games for Walsall he averaged 113 runs an innings and scored three centuries.

== Test cricketer ==
After starting the 1975–76 season slowly (4 against Queensland, 20 and 8 against the West Indies, 21 and 6 against South Australia), Yallop scored two half-centuries against South Australia (79 and 62) and made scores of 108 and 95 against New South Wales. As a result he was called into the Australian team for the fourth Test match against the touring West Indies at the Sydney Cricket Ground, replacing Rick McCosker who had made 20 runs in six innings in the first three Tests of the series. Yallop was surprised at the call up, but said that it was "a great thrill and I'm determined to make the most of my chance".

The dropping of McCosker was not popular with Australian captain Greg Chappell and other members of the team, and Yallop was put in to bat at number three, McCosker's usual place in the batting order. In his memoirs Yallop wrote that he had "no doubts that certain members of that team wanted me to fail and therefore prove that the selectors had erred. Normally, a new batsman could expect to be cradled into the team and be 'hidden' down the order until he gets the feel of the test atmosphere." He scored 16 and then 16 not out on debut, and was retained in the team for the fifth Test at Adelaide, scoring 47 and 43 and featuring in century partnerships in each innings, with Ian Redpath and Alan Turner.

McCosker returned to the team for the sixth test at the MCG, batting at number three, but Yallop kept his place; batting down the order at number six he made 57 in the first innings and did not bat in the second. He had averaged 44 runs per innings in the three Tests. Bob Simpson later wrote that when Yallop made his test debut he "was ostracised by the ruling team clique at the time and was never allowed to feel at home in the team. Their attitude seemed to that Yallop had had a privileged upbringing and was something of a spoilt brat. They also felt that he was a little faint hearted against fast bowlers."

Following the retirement of Ian Chappell and Redpath, Yallop had a chance to consolidate his place in the Australian team in 1976–77. Chappell wrote at the start of the summer that he felt the batsman "had a head start" over his rivals "with a couple of steady Test performances last year, but he still has a lot of work ahead and will have to spread his run scoring around Australian grounds a little more consistently than in the past."

In November 1976 The Age wrote that Yallop and Ian Davis were "the leading candidates" for the number three spot left vacant by Ian Chappell's retirement.

However Yallop again started the summer slowly with scores of 10, 19, 16 and 1, and with Doug Walters returning from injury and Davis promoted to opener, Yallop lost his place in the team. By the time he regained form, Kim Hughes had become the established batsman in "reserve". In January 1977, Ian Chappell selected a hypothetical Ashes tour squad for Cricketer magazine that excluded Yallop, writing that he had not "made enough runs off the Melbourne ground to prove he has the goods" and that "I still maintain that Yallop was picked prematurely for Australia. Yallop was not selected for the tour of England in 1977 and he was not offered a contract with World Series Cricket - in contrast with several other batters who had not played test cricket (Martin Kent, Trevor Chappell, Bruce Laird, Rob Langer).

== Test recall ==
The advent of World Series Cricket (WSC) during 1977 meant that a number of leading Australian cricketers were banned from playing for the national team. Yallop took over the captaincy of Victoria after Richie Robinson signed to play WSC. Bob Simpson came out of retirement to captain Australia over the 1977–78 summer, but Yallop was not selected for the first Test against the touring Indians, once more having started the summer not in top form. Even after a pair of centuries against New South Wales he was not selected until the fifth and final Test of the summer. With the series standing at 2–2, Yallop was selected as vice-captain, scoring 121 runs in Australia's first innings, his maiden Test century as Australian won the series. He made a total of 729 first-class runs that summer, at an average of 56.07 runs per innings. After Yallop's selection Ian Chappell wrote Yallop was a poor player of pace but a good player of spin "and his presence in the current test series should have been a must" from the beginning of the series.

=== 1978 West Indies Tour ===
The Australian team to tour the West Indies was selected at the same time as the fifth Test and Yallop was included, although the vice-captain on the West Indies tour was Jeff Thomson.

Yallop scored 24 and 28 against the Leeward Islands, and 12 (off 11 balls) in the first ODI. He made 66 and 44 not out against Trinidad and Tobago, helping Australia run down a six wicket victory. For the first test, Yallop made only 2 in the first innings but scored 81 in the second, easily Australia's top score (the West Indies won by an innings and 106 runs). Yallop missed the next tour game, against Barbados, but played in the second test, making 47 and 14.

Yallop scored 118 in a tour game against Guyana when his jaw was broken by a bouncer from Colin Croft. He missed the third Test (David Ogilvie replaced him), which was won by Australia.

Yallop returned to the Australian team for the second ODI, making 7. In the fourth test he scored 75 in the first innings but only 18 in the second as Australia collapsed and lost by 198 runs. Yallop played against Jamaica, making 5 and 58. In the final test he scored 57 and 23 not out. His series tally was 317 Test runs at an average of 45.29.

== Australian Captain: "A lamb to the slaughter" ==
At the beginning of the 1978–79 season, the Australian Cricket Board (ACB) decided that Bob Simpson should not continue as captain and Yallop was installed as his replacement ahead of the first Test of the Ashes series against England. The Australian team was inexperienced at an international level. According to Christian Ryan, "Most observers suspected John Inverarity, wily and versatile, would have been a more astute choice" than Yallop; the Australian selectors, however, did not have faith in Inverarity's ability at Test level.

Yallop made what he later described as a "flippant" prediction that his team would win the Ashes 6–0 and was "bewildered" when his "flippant" prediction was reported straight-faced by the media and taken seriously by the English players. Despite a century in Australia's second innings of the first Test, the team was beaten by seven wickets in the series opener. A further loss in the second Test was followed by what was to be Yallop's only victory as a Test captain in the third match at the MCG.

Two more losses followed, and Australia played the final Test of the summer with the Ashes already lost. At the SCG Australia were dismissed for 198, of which Yallop scored 121; the next highest score was 16 and Yallop later said this was his greatest Test match innings. England made 308 for their first innings; Australia collapsed for 141 and with England needing only 34 runs for victory, Yallop elected to open the bowling in England's second innings with the old ball, to the consternation of England's captain Mike Brearley. Yallop won the man of the match award but Australia had lost the series 5–1. In his account of the series, The Ashes Retained, Brearley wrote that the English players nicknamed Yallop "Banzai" because of his tendency to adopt suicidally attacking fields at all times, when on occasion a more defensive approach may have prevented the England team's free scoring.

Despite the series loss to England, Yallop led Australia against Pakistan in March 1978, again losing the first Test of the two-match series. He injured his calf in a club match, leading Richmond to victory in a district semi final, which forced him to miss the second Test match. Australia finally reversed their losing streak, with Kim Hughes captaining the team, prompting the selectors to drop Yallop as captain in favour of Hughes.

=== Lambs To the Slaughter ===
At the end of the summer, a book came out under Yallop's name about his season's experiences, entitled Lambs To The Slaughter. On page one he commented that: "I should be bitter, but I am not. Disappointed, yes, because after so many heartbreaks this was a rather ruthless end. I was the fall guy, the player who carried the ACB flag all summer against all the odds." Chapter headings included "Sacked", "The First Killing", "Skinned Alive", and "Slaughtered". The book had been, however, written by a ghost writer and it transpired that Yallop had not read it prior to publication; he later began legal action to stop sections of the book being published, but this was withdrawn.

== Post-captaincy ==
Yallop kept his place in the team after losing the captaincy, playing in the 1979 Cricket World Cup and all six Tests on the tour of India in late 1979, the last Australian series before the WSC players were welcomed back into the national team. In the third Test of the series he top scored in Australia's first innings with 89 and in the fifth Test opened the batting and scored a first innings 167, his highest Test score to date. He was retained as an opener for the sixth Test, top-scoring with another half-century in Australia's first innings.

When WSC players returned to the Australian Test team, Yallop was dropped, although he was retained as Victorian captain despite Richie Robinson, captain in 1976–77, returning to the team. He played in a single One Day International (ODI) during the 1979–80 season and was selected for the tour of Pakistan in early 1980.

Yallop regained his place in the Test team for the first Test of the three-match series, again playing as an opener alongside Bruce Laird. He dropped down the order to play at number five in the second Test and scored 172, his highest first-class score to date; the innings included a 217 run partnership with Greg Chappell. He retained his place for the 1980 tour of England for the second Centenary Test.

While in England, Yallop resigned as captain of Victoria stating that he "would like to continue to play for Australia as long as I possibly can, and I want to put all my efforts into playing cricket for Australia" and that he felt he "couldn't justify being Victorian captain and giving the wholehearted effort required, while still giving my best efforts." Despite this he was not picked for Australia during the 1980–81 summer, losing his spot to Doug Walters who was experiencing a resurgence of form, whilst Yallop's had dropped off again.

In February 1981, Ian Chappell included Yallop in his suggested Ashes squad for the 1981 tour of England saying he was "the best middle order batsman outside the test team" but that he "needs to learn that a bit of pain has to be suffered to consistently succeed in Test cricket." He was selected for the team to tour England, a report calling him "one of the few class batsman in the country". He played in all six Tests on the tour as England retained the Ashes. Much was made of Yallop's susceptibility to fast bowling because of an unusual incident during the fourth Test of the 1981 tour. Skipper Kim Hughes tried to protect Yallop from Bob Willis's bowling by controlling the strike, even though Yallop had not asked him to. Commentating on the match, Richie Benaud called Hughes's actions "as curious a captaincy decision as I have ever seen".

Yallop began the 1981–82 season strongly and played in the first Test against Pakistan but then suffered a back injury and did not play for Australia for the rest of the summer. He returned to the Victorian team in December and scored 647 first-class during the season but was overlooked for the Australian tour of Pakistan in 1982, the selectors preferring to take Greg Ritchie and Wayne Phillips. It was the first official overseas tour Yallop had missed since the 1977 Ashes.

== Career peak: 1982-84 ==
Yallop was reappointed as Victoria's captain for the 1982–83 season and enjoyed a golden run of form that summer. He scored three centuries, including making 246 runs against Queensland, his first double century, and made a total of 1,418 first class runs at an average of 67.52 runs per innings, beating Bill Ponsford's record for the most runs in an Australian domestic season.

With the Australian middle-order batters all scoring consistently, he was, however, unable to break into the international team during the home summer.

Yallop was selected on the 1983 tour of Sri Lanka after Kim Hughes chose not to go on the tour. He scored 98 in the only Test match on the tour in a comfortable Australian victory.

His form continued in the One Day International series, including making three half-centuries in the four matches on the tour,

Yallop was chosen in Australia's squad for the 1983 Cricket World Cup in England where he performed well, making another two half-centuries, although the team did not advance beyond the group stage of the competition.

=== 1983-84 vs Pakistan ===
Yallop's best performances as a Test cricketer came during the 1983–84 season, when Pakistan toured Australia. In the first Test he made 141, taking part in a 259 run partnership with debutant Wayne Phillips, an Australian record for any wicket against Pakistan.

In a tour match against the Pakistanis he scored 220 for Victoria before scoring 268 in the fourth Test at the MCG, his highest first-class score to date. He featured in partnerships of 203 with Hughes for the third wicket and 185 with Greg Matthews for the seventh wicket, both record stands for Australia against Pakistan. His 268 was, at the time, the highest score by an Australian against Pakistan and the seventh highest score by an Australian in any Test match.

A contemporary report said "that Yallop should be the celebrity of the Australian team demonstrates again cricket's delightful uncertainty." It quoted Arthur Morris who called him "a beautiful player of spin and medium pace" and Lindsay Hassett who said "I can't think of any player who has been treated worse." Bob Simpson called the innings "one of the finest I have seen" and said "Yallop has been one of the most maligned and poorly treated players in my experience in cricket."

A score of 30 in the fifth Test brought Yallop's series aggregate to 554 runs at an average of 92.33, comfortably the best result of any Australian batsman. (Although Man of the Series Award was given to Geoff Lawson.) His summer's total was 1,132 first-class runs at 113.20.

Yallop then played in Australia's ODI team against the West Indies. During the game, Yallop strained his left knee in a fielding mishap when trying to stop a boundary from Viv Richards. Yallop came out to bat when Australia was 8-153 and managed to score 13 runs off 28 balls before being dismissed. He was ruled out of the ODI team and was replaced by David Hookes.

Yallop was selected for the 1983–84 tour of the West Indies, but Dean Jones was placed on standby in case Yallop's injury did not recover. Yallop ultimately did not make the tour and Jones played instead.

In July 1984 Yallop was one of the sixteen Australian players contracted by the Australian Cricket Board and he was selected on the 14-man ODI tour of India. In the ODIs Yallop, batting down the order, made 22, 32 and 42.

For the 1984-85 summer Yallop scored 14 for Victoria in an ODI game. Against Queensland he made 0 and 2 but he was picked in the first Test against the touring West Indies. He scored 2 and 1. Yallop then withdrew himself from the Victorian Shield team to play Tasmania, claiming a knee injury.

== South African rebel tours ==
On his return to domestic cricket, Yallop scored 21 and 0 against Queensland and 34 and 1 against South Australia.

However scores of 58 and 125 against New South Wales, and 51 and 22 against Tasmania led to him being discussed as a possible selection for the 1985 Ashes. Despite later scoring 147 against New South Wales he was not selected for the tour.

Believing that his time in the Australian team was at an end, Yallop joined the rebel Australian team led by Kim Hughes which played in apartheid era South Africa. Yallop was Hughes' vice captain in the 1985–86 team. "A number of us were given the word that the selectors didn't see us as having any future as Test players," said Yallop. "We were told – quietly, of course – that our futures weren't exactly rosy. So when the approach came, we were interested." South Africa was subject to a sporting boycott due to the apartheid regime and, along with the other players who joined the team, Yallop was banned for two years from Australian first-class cricket, and for three years from international cricket.

Yallop's first summer in South Africa started well with 35 and 62 against Orange Free State. However it was not successful overall, only making 272 first class runs at an average of 27.2 with a top score of 62; in the unofficial test matches that he played Yallop scored 51 and 24, and 20 and 6. He scored 184 one day runs at an average of 26.28 with two half centuries.

Hughes publicly criticised Yallop's contribution, saying his "unavailability has cost us dearly on tour. Had Yallop been fit and in the right frame of mind ... you've got to want to play. As vice-captain you've got a huge responsibility. People such as [Mick] Taylor, who had no reputations, have made one for themselves, while Yallop, who had all the reputation, has not really done anything."

He played better the following year when he was no longer the vice-captain of the team, scoring 552 runs at an average of 61.33, with a top score of 182. He played one test scoring 36 and 26.

Yallop later said he had "mixed emotions" about the rebel tours. "Knowing now what it was like there, there were certain things they kept from us, certain things we weren't meant to see but did. But hindsight is a wonderful thing, isn't it? Certainly we enjoyed it while we were there. But reflecting on it, there's mixed emotions. Disappointing thing, politics." At the time Australian Prime Minister Bob Hawke was highly critical of the tour, saying that "I and this government will not change our view about that obnoxious system of apartheid. We will not change our position as to it being not right for people to collect themselves and deem themselves an Australian team, to give aid and comfort to that regime in South Africa… which is so blatantly and desperately seeking international legitimacy via the medium of apparent international competition." Hawke called the players "traitors" whilst others labelled them "mercenaries and pariahs".

After two seasons in South Africa, Yallop returned to the relative obscurity of district cricket in Melbourne, playing for the South Melbourne and Ringwood clubs. He never played first-class cricket again: the majority of the rebel tourists were embraced by their old states but not the Victorians. Yallop says they were "shunned by the Victorian Cricket Association... We knew the VCA wouldn't pick us. It was disappointing, we could've given a lot to the game at that stage; we weren't that old. But we were certainly shunned by the association."

== Appraisal ==
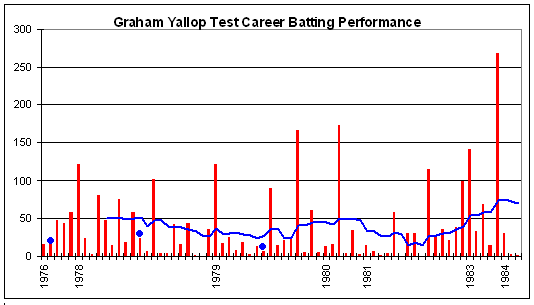
Graham Yallop's Test career batting performance.

Undoubtedly, Yallop was more at home against slow bowling and was considered one of the best players of spinners during an era when few existed. Although not ideally suited to the one-day game, Yallop's ODI figures are good and he played in the World Cups of 1979 and 1983 and toured India in 1984. He was a safe fielder behind the wicket and was often positioned in the gully. He averaged better than one century every five Tests and never went more than six consecutive Tests without a hundred.

As a leader, he was "a fatally flawed, forlorn captain... He was unimaginative, tactically unsophisticated and lacked the respect of his players." Mike Brearley, Yallop's opposing captain during the 1978–79 series, noted that Yallop used to "... slide his back foot to and fro in a grandmotherly shuffle ... More than most Test players, Yallop can range from the inept to the masterly." On his relationship with the Australian selectors however, Christian Ryan writes that "he is not the only Australian batsman of the last 25 years to have been mistreated by selectors... But Yallop was the first, and arguably copped the rawest deal, of them all.... Graham Yallop in three words? Unlucky Uncelebrated Unmissed seem to fit best, more's the pity."

== Post-cricket career ==
In 1989 Yallop was fined $1,000 for selling alcohol at his cricket centre. In 1994 he was sacked as manager of a sports centre but successfully appealed the decision.

In 2014–15 Yallop was appointed chief coach of Elwood Cricket Club. He has worked closely with Indonesian cricket, coaching and fund raising, including donating one of his baggy green caps for auction for its development. In appreciation, the premier cricket ground in Jakarta was named the Graham Yallop Oval in his honour.

== Sources ==
- Nicholls, B. (2015) The Establishment Boys, New Holland Publishers: Sydney. ISBN 9781742577067.
- Yallop, Graham (1979). Lambs to the Slaughter. Outback Press, Collingwood. ISBN 0-86888-227-5..
