= John Maclean (Australian cricketer) =

Australian cricketer (1946–2026)

John Maclean, MBE
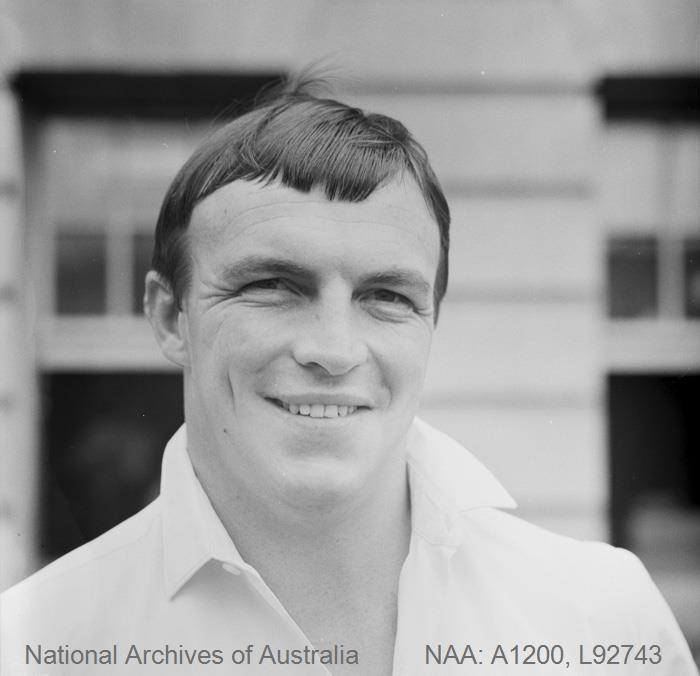
- Maclean in 1971

Personal information
- Full name: John Alexander Maclean
- Born: 27 April 1946; Herston, Queensland, Australia
- Died: 16 May 2026 (aged 80)
- Batting: Right-handed
- Role: Wicket-keeper

International information
- National side: Australia
- Test debut (cap 298): 1 December 1978 v England
- Last Test: 6 January 1979 v England
- ODI debut (cap 51): 13 January 1979 v England
- Last ODI: 24 January 1979 v England

Domestic team information
- Years: Team
- 1968–69–1978–79: Queensland

Career statistics
Competition	Test	ODI	FC	LA
Matches	4	2	108	22
Runs scored	79	11	3,888	232
Batting average	11.28	11.00	24.45	19.33
100s/50s	0/0	0/0	2/14	0/1
Top score	33*	11	156	61*
Catches/stumpings	18/–	0/–	354/31	35/1
- Source: Cricinfo, 12 December 2018

John Alexander Maclean MBE (27 April 1946 – 16 May 2026) was an Australian Test cricketer who played in four Test matches and two One Day Internationals in 1978 and 1979. He captained Queensland 30 times in 86 games. He played in four Queensland sides that came second in the Sheffield Shield.

Maclean later said "I was lucky to get four Tests. I was lucky to play for Queensland, to be honest. You take what you can get."

== Early life and education ==
Maclean was born in Herston, Brisbane, Queensland, Australia on 27 April 1946. He was educated at Brisbane State High School. He completed a Bachelor of Engineering (Civil) and Bachelor of Economics from the University of Queensland.

He was a champion athlete as a schoolboy, but he did not make his first-class debut until 1968.

== Career ==
In 1968–69, Maclean broke Wally Grout's record for the most dismissals for a first class season. He scored 156 against South Australia in 1969–70.

In January 1970 Maclean was selected in an Australian team to tour New Zealand under Sam Trimble. However he was overlooked in favour of Rod Marsh as test keeper in 1970–71.

Maclean was overlooked as reserve keeper on the tours to England in 1972, 1975 and 1977.

He gave up the Queensland captaincy to Greg Chappell in 1973–74 when Chappell moved to Queensland. He would captain in Chappell's absence and resumed as main captain in 1977–78 following the defection of many of the leading Australian cricketers to the competing World Series Cricket competition.

Maclean was favoured to become Australian keeper in 1977–78, but was overlooked for the test series against India and West Indies in favour of Steve Rixon. However he was selected at the start of the 1978–79 Ashes series.

=== Test player ===
Maclean had a strong first test, taking five catches in England's first innings and scoring important runs, coming to the wicket when Australia was 5-24, and scoring 33 not out. Australia lost the game.

For the third test, Maclean was appointed Australian vice captain after Gary Cosier was dropped. Maclean was injured during training after the test by an Alan Hurst delivery. He played in the fourth test but the strain of fielding forced him to retire during the match and Graham Yallop had to take the gloves. Maclean was dropped for the fifth test although he still went on and played two ODIs for Australia.

He retired at the end of the summer.

The Queensland Cricket Association (QCA) granted Maclean a benefit in the 1978–79 season; only the second benefit (after Sam Trimble) granted by the QCA.

Maclean was made a Member of the Order of the British Empire in 1980 for his services to cricket.

== Post-cricket career ==
In 2007, Maclean was the Workgroup Manager of Land and Infrastructure Development at Opus International Consultants in Brisbane as well as an advisor to the Queensland Academy of Sport (QAS) through the QAS Board. Before this position Maclean was chairman of Development Planning Pty Ltd and a director of Farr Evrat Engineers and Tabletop Architects and Planners.

== Personal life and death ==
Maclean had four sons. He died on 16 May 2026, at the age of 80.
