= Mike Brearley =

English cricketer

Mike Brearley OBE
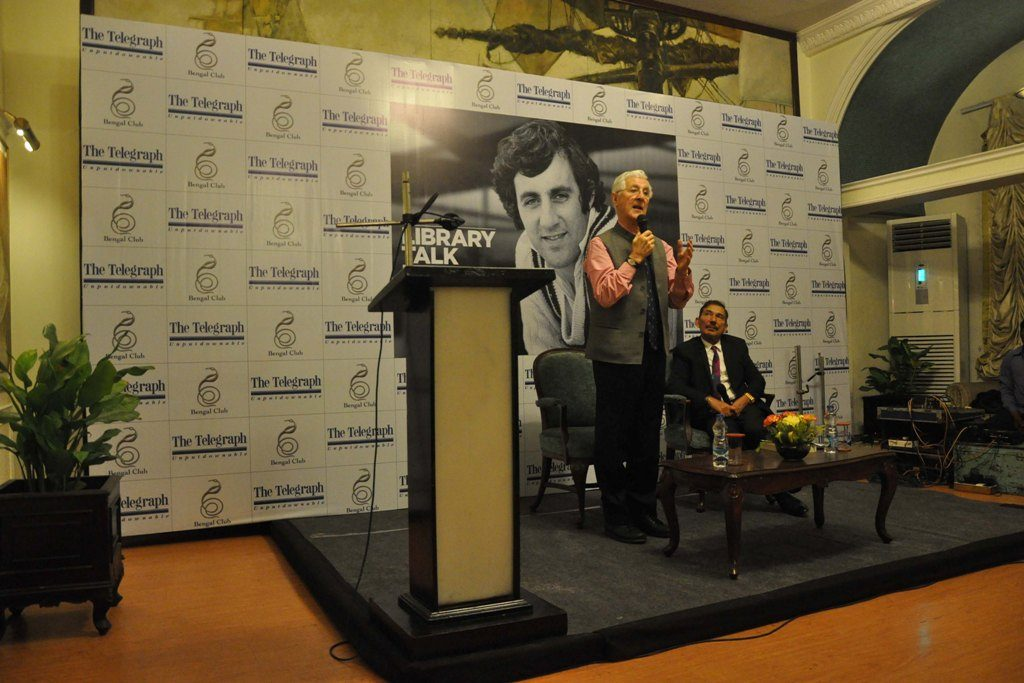
- Brearley pictured standing

Personal information
- Full name: John Michael Brearley
- Born: 28 April 1942 (age 84); Harrow, Middlesex, England
- Nickname: Brears, Scagg
- Height: 5 ft 11 in (180 cm)
- Batting: Right-handed
- Bowling: Right arm medium
- Relatives: Horace Brearley (father); Mana Sarabhai (spouse)

International information
- National side: England
- Test debut (cap 465): 3 June 1976 v West Indies
- Last Test: 27 August 1981 v Australia
- ODI debut (cap 38): 2 June 1977 v Australia
- Last ODI: 22 January 1980 v West Indies

Domestic team information
- Years: Team
- 1961–1983: Middlesex
- 1961–1968: Cambridge University

Career statistics
Competition	Test	ODI	FC	LA
Matches	39	25	455	272
Runs scored	1,442	510	25,186	6135
Batting average	22.88	24.28	37.81	26.44
100s/50s	0/9	0/3	45/134	3/37
Top score	91	78	312*	124*
Balls bowled	0	0	315	48
Wickets	–	–	3	4
Bowling average	–	–	64.00	15.00
5 wickets in innings	–	–	0	0
10 wickets in match	–	–	0	0
Best bowling	–	–	1/6	2/3
Catches/stumpings	52/–	12/–	418/12	111/–
Medal record
Men's Cricket
Representing England
ICC Cricket World Cup
Runner-up	1979 England
- Source: Cricinfo, 8 February 2008

John Michael Brearley OBE (born 28 April 1942) is a retired English first-class cricketer who captained Cambridge University, Middlesex, and England to three successive Ashes series wins. He was the captain of the English squad which finished as runners-up at the 1979 Cricket World Cup.

Brearley captained the international side in 31 of his 39 Test matches, winning 18 and losing only 4. He was the President of the Marylebone Cricket Club (MCC) in 2007–08. Since his retirement from professional cricket he has pursued a career as a psychoanalyst, psychotherapist (registered with the BPC), motivational speaker, and writer, serving as President of the British Psychoanalytical Society 2008–10. In 2015, an article in the Bleacher Report ranked Brearley as England's greatest-ever cricket captain.

== Early life ==
Brearley was born in Harrow, Middlesex, England, and was educated at the City of London School (where his father Horace, himself a first-class cricketer, was a master). While at St John's College, Cambridge, Brearley excelled at cricket (he was then a wicketkeeper/batsman). After making 76 on his first-class debut as a wicketkeeper, he played for Cambridge University between 1961 and 1968 (captaining the side in 1964), first as an undergraduate in the Classical and Moral Sciences tripos, and then as a postgraduate.

While still at Cambridge, he was chosen for the Marylebone Cricket Club (MCC) tour to South Africa in 1964–65, and to captain the MCC Under-25 side in Pakistan in 1966–67, where he scored 312 not out against North Zone (his highest first-class score) and 223 against the Pakistan Under-25 side. He ended the tour with 793 runs from six matches at an average of 132.

== County cricket ==
From 1961 onwards, he played for Middlesex County Cricket Club, often opening the innings with Michael Smith. As captain between 1971 and 1982, he led Middlesex to County Championships in 1976, 1977 (jointly with Kent), 1980 and 1982; and he appeared in Free Foresters' very last first-class fixture, in 1968, keeping wicket and scoring 91.

== International cricket ==
In part because of his pursuit of an academic career as a lecturer in philosophy at the University of Newcastle-upon-Tyne, which limited his cricketing activity in 1969 and 1970, Brearley was not selected for England until the age of 34 in 1976. His record in Test cricket as a batsman was modest (he averaged 22.88 in 66 Test innings, without a century), but he was an outstanding captain. He made his highest test score of 91 on tour against India in February 1977. Having previously kept wicket, he was also a fine slip catcher, usually at first slip. He took over as captain of England later in 1977.

His management skills (he was once described by Rodney Hogg as having "a degree in people") drew the best from the players in his team, although he was fortunate to be able to call on the services of Bob Willis, David Gower and Ian Botham at their peak. Brearley was captain during the infamous aluminium bat incident in 1979, when he objected to Dennis Lillee's use of a metal bat instead of one made of willow. On the same tour, he caused controversy at the end of an international one-day match against the West Indies at the Sydney Cricket Ground when he ordered all his fielders, including the wicketkeeper, to the boundary with three runs required off the last ball (this was legal under the rules of the time).

In all, Botham and Willis took 262 wickets during the 31 test matches that Brearley captained. The importance of Willis in particular to England led Brearley into further controversies regarding the bowling of short-pitched deliveries at recognised tailend batsmen, during Pakistan's tour of England in 1978, and more briefly, during England's 1978–9 tour of Australia. Brearley himself had been an innovator regarding cricket equipment himself, wearing a 'skull cap' under his England cap in 1977 (in the days before players wore helmets). It consisted of a plastic protector with two side pieces protecting his temples. It was later popularised by the Indian batsman Sunil Gavaskar.

Brearley captained England to the final of the 1979 Cricket World Cup, scoring 53 in the semi-final against New Zealand and 64 in the final against the West Indies. However, his opening partnership of 129 with Geoff Boycott in the final used up 38 of 60 allotted overs; although it was recognised that a potent pace attack of Andy Roberts, Michael Holding, Colin Croft and Joel Garner needed to be countered, the speed of the partnership greatly added to the pressure on the rest of the order. Garner bowled a spell of 5 wickets for 4 runs to induce a drastic collapse and hand the West Indies the match and the World Cup by 92 runs.

Having passed the England captaincy to Ian Botham in 1980 (losing his Test place in the process), Brearley returned as captain following Botham's resignation for the third Test against Australia at Headingley in 1981, going on to win the match and two of the remaining three matches of the series to win the Ashes 3–1.

His leadership benefited from Botham's recovered form following his winless captaincy record and his nosedive in form (he had made a pair in the second Test at Lord's) to take a first-innings 6 for 95 and score 50 and 149 not out in the third Test at Headingley, bowl a spell of 5 wickets for 1 run in the fourth Test at Edgbaston, score 118 from 102 balls in the fifth Test at Old Trafford, and take a 10-wicket match haul (6 for 125 and 4 for 128) in the sixth Test at the Oval. In spite of his limited reputation as an international batsman, Brearley also made an important if less high-profile contribution to the fourth test, scoring more runs than any other batsman (61) in a match which England won by 29 runs.

In 1981, a letter in the Guardian, from S.A.Nicholas, read

Dear Sir, on Friday I watched JM Brearley very carefully as he directed his fieldsmen. He then looked up at the sun and made a gesture which seemed to indicate that it should move a little squarer. Who is this man?

== Post-cricket career ==
Brearley opposed sporting links with apartheid South Africa, seconding a motion to the MCC in 1968 calling for the cessation of tours until there was progress towards non-racial cricket. He seconded the motion from David Sheppard to the MCC, calling for the England tour to South Africa to be cancelled, and was a supporter of John Arlott who campaigned in The Guardian for the same objective.

He later became a psychoanalyst, psychotherapist (registered with the BPC), motivational speaker, and part-time cricket journalist for The Times. He was appointed an OBE in 1978, and published The Art of Captaincy in 1985. He published another book, On Form, in 2017. In 1998, he became an Honorary Fellow of his Cambridge college, St. John's and in 2006 was awarded an honorary doctorate by Oxford Brookes University.

Brearley succeeded Doug Insole as President of MCC on 1 October 2007, and chose Derek Underwood to succeed him at the end of his term. He was president of the British Psychoanalytical Society, 2008–10.

In June 2024 Brearley was quoted in The Cricket Paper "Both the ICC's deal with Aramco and the MCC's with JP Morgan are disturbing. There is currently so much 'rowing back' from recognising the huge dangers of climate change and the need for us to be proactive on the edge of this abyss. We all have to make some sacrifices in order to do this...The CEO of Aramco recently said 'we should abandon the fantasy of phasing out oil and gas' I find this remark chilling. We in cricket should not align ourselves with such views".

== Personal life ==
Brearley has been married twice. He is married to Mana Sarabhai, who is from Ahmedabad, India and whose father was a psychoanalyst. They have two children together.

Brearley lives in London.

== Works ==
- 1985: The Art of Captaincy
- 2017: On Form
- 2018: On Cricket
- 2020: Spirit of Cricket: Reflections on Play and Life
- 2023: Turning Over the Pebbles: A Life in Cricket and in the Mind (memoir)

Sporting positions
Preceded by Tony Greig Ian Botham	English national cricket captain 1977–1980 (Geoffrey Boycott deputised 1977/78); 1981	Succeeded by Ian Botham Keith Fletcher
Preceded by Peter Parfitt	Middlesex county cricket captain 1971–1982	Succeeded by Mike Gatting
Preceded by Doug Insole	Marylebone Cricket Club President; 2007–2008	Succeeded by Derek Underwood
