= List of international cricket five-wicket hauls by B. S. Chandrasekhar =

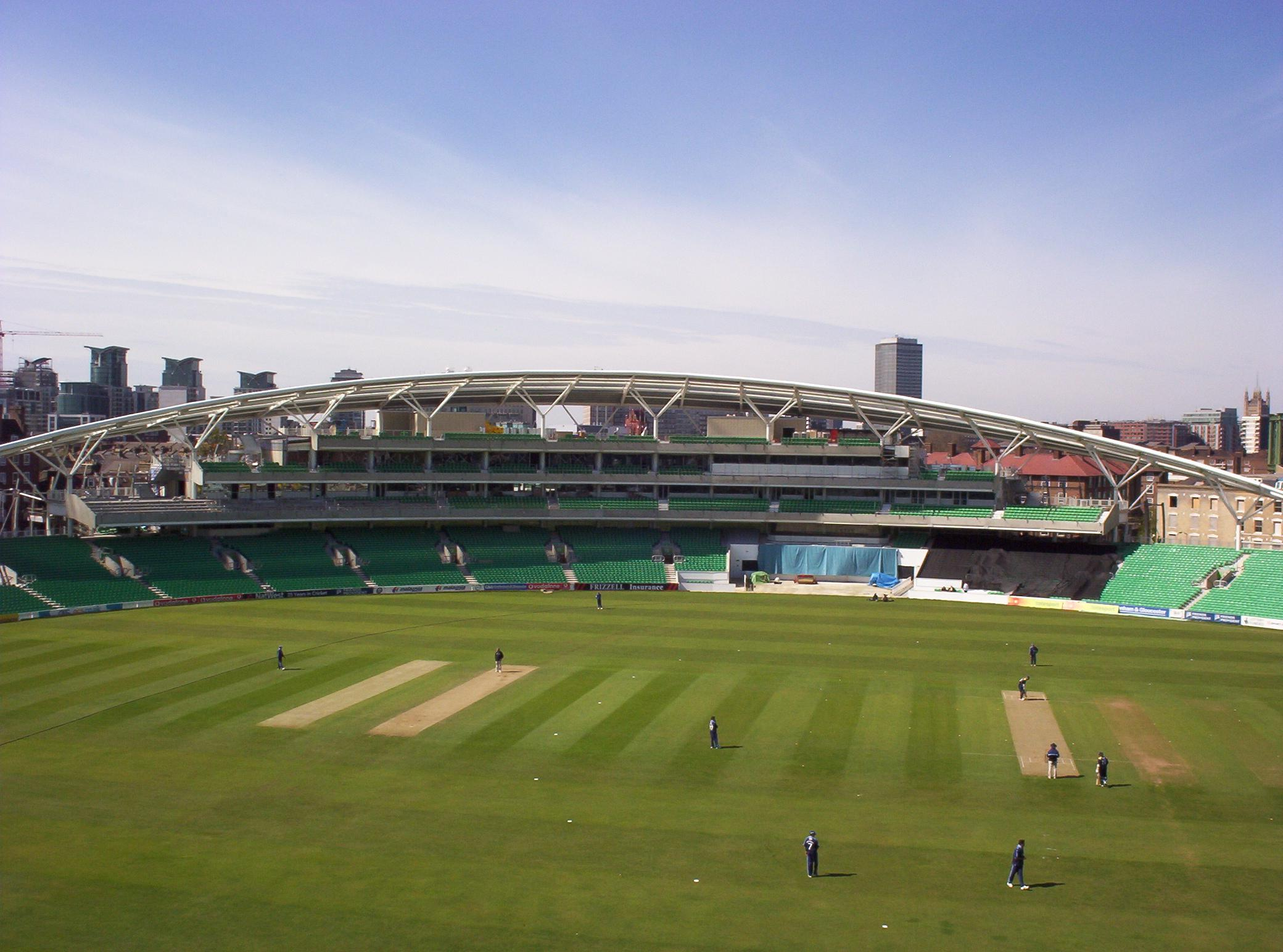
Chandrasekhar's six wickets for 38 runs at the Kennington Oval was influential in setting up India's first ever series victory in England.

B. S. Chandrasekhar is a former international cricketer who represented the Indian cricket team between 1964 and 1979. In cricket, a five-wicket haul refers to a bowler taking five or more wickets in a single innings. This is regarded as a notable achievement, and as of October 2024, only 54 bowlers have taken 15 or more five-wicket hauls at international level in their cricketing careers. Chandrasekhar played as a leg spin bowler who formed a part of the Indian spin quartet. (Note: The other members were Bishen Singh Bedi, EAS Prasanna and Srinivas Venkataraghavan.) Described by West Indies cricketer Viv Richards as the "most difficult" bowler, Chandrasekhar took 16 five-wicket hauls during his international career. He developed an interest in the game when he was a child, watching the playing styles of Australian leg spinner Richie Benaud. Chandrasekhar was affected by polio at the age of five which weakened his right arm. He started as a left-arm bowler but gradually shifted to his withered right arm as it could offer more spin.

Chandrasekhar made his Test debut in 1964 against England at the Brabourne Stadium, claiming four wickets for 67 runs in the first innings. His first five-wicket haul came against West Indies two years later at the same venue. Chandrasekhar's bowling figures of six wickets for 38 runs in 1971 were instrumental in setting up India's first victory in England. It was noted as the Indian "Bowling Performance of the Century" by Wisden in 2002. His bowling performances in the previous English season led to him being named one of the five Wisden Cricketers of the Year in 1972. His career-best figures for an innings were eight wickets for 79 runs against England at the Feroz Shah Kotla Ground in December 1972. Chandrasekhar took a pair of five-wicket hauls for the only time in his career when he took 12 wickets for 104 runs against Australia at the Melbourne Cricket Ground; the performance was effective in ensuring India's first victory in Australia. In Tests, he was most successful against England taking eight fifers.

Chandrasekhar played his only One Day International in February 1976 against New Zealand in Eden Park. He claimed three wickets for 36 runs in the match that India lost by 80 runs.

== Key ==
Symbol	Meaning
Date	Day the Test started or ODI was held
Inn	The innings of the match in which the five-wicket haul was taken
Overs	Number of overs bowled in that innings
Runs	Runs conceded
Wkts	Number of wickets taken
Batsmen	The batsmen whose wickets were taken in the five-wicket haul
Econ	Bowling economy rate (average runs per over)
Result	The result for the Indian team in that match
†	Chandrasekhar was selected "Bowler of the Match"
‡	10 wickets or more taken in the match
§	One of two five-wicket hauls by Chandrasekhar in a match

== Tests ==
List of five-wicket hauls taken by B. S. Chandrasekhar in Test cricket
No.	Date	Ground	Against	Inn	Overs	Runs	Wkts	Econ	Batsmen	Result
1	13 December 1966 ‡	Brabourne Stadium, Mumbai	West Indies	2	61.5	157	7	2.53	Robin Bynoe; Rohan Kanhai; Basil Butcher; Clive Lloyd; David Holford; Jackie Hendriks; Charlie Griffith	Lost
2	22 June 1967 † (Note: Chandrasekhar shared the "Bowler of the Match" award with Ray Illingworth.)	Lord's Cricket Ground, London	England	2	53	127	5	2.39	Ken Barrington; Dennis Amiss; Basil D'Oliveira; John Murray; Ray Illingworth	Lost
3	19 August 1971	Kennington Oval, London	England	3	18.1	38	6	2.09	Brian Luckhurst; John Edrich; Keith Fletcher; Ray Illingworth; John Snow; John Price	Won
4	20 December 1972	Feroz Shah Kotla Ground, Delhi	England	2	41.5	79	8	1.88	Barry Wood; Keith Fletcher; Tony Lewis; Alan Knott; Geoff Arnold; Pat Pocock; Derek Underwood; Bob Cottam	Lost
5	30 December 1972	Eden Gardens, Kolkata	England	2	26.2	65	5	2.46	Dennis Amiss; Mike Denness; Alan Knott; Derek Underwood; Bob Cottam	Won
6	12 January 1973	M. A. Chidambaram Stadium, Chennai	England	1	38.5	90	6	2.31	Dennis Amiss; Tony Greig; Tony Lewis; Chris Old; Norman Gifford; Pat Pocock	Won
7	6 February 1973	Brabourne Stadium, Mumbai	England	2	46.1	135	5	2.92	Graham Roope; Alan Knott; Tony Greig; Jack Birkenshaw; Geoff Arnold	Drawn
8	24 January 1976	Eden Park, Auckland	New Zealand	1	30 (Note: Eight-ball overs were bowled in this match.)	94	6	2.35	John Morrison; Glen Turner; John Parker; Dayle Hadlee; David O'Sullivan; Hedley Howarth	Won
9	7 April 1976	Queen's Park Oval, Port of Spain	West Indies	1	32.2	120	6	3.71	Roy Fredericks; Lawrence Rowe; Alvin Kallicharran; Clive Lloyd; Deryck Murray; Raphick Jumadeen	Won
10	21 April 1976	Sabina Park, Kingston	West Indies	2	42	153	5	3.64	Vivian Richards; Alvin Kallicharran; Clive Lloyd; Deryck Murray; Bernard Julien	Won
11	14 January 1977	M. A. Chidambaram Stadium, Chennai	England	3	20.5	50	5	2.40	Dennis Amiss; John Lever; Mike Brearley; Derek Randall; Derek Underwood	Lost
12	28 January 1977	Chinnaswamy Stadium, Bangalore	England	2	31.2	76	6	2.42	Dennis Amiss; Mike Brearley; Roger Tolchard; Tony Greig; Derek Underwood; Bob Willis	Won
13	30 December 1977 ‡ §	Melbourne Cricket Ground, Melbourne	Australia	2	14.1	52	6	2.76	Gary Cosier; Craig Serjeant; Bob Simpson; Steve Rixon; Wayne Clark; Jeff Thomson	Won
14	30 December 1977 ‡ §	Melbourne Cricket Ground, Melbourne	Australia	4	20	52	6	1.95	Gary Cosier; Craig Serjeant; Bob Simpson; Peter Toohey; Tony Mann; Steve Rixon	Won
15	28 January 1978	Adelaide Oval	Australia	1	29.4	136	5	3.45	Graeme Wood; Rick Darling; Peter Toohey; Jeff Thomson; Wayne Clark	Lost
16	1 December 1978	Wankhede Stadium, Mumbai	West Indies	2	43	116	5	2.69	Larry Gomes; Faoud Bacchus; David Murray; Derick Parry; Vanburn Holder	Drawn
