= 1975–76 Gillette Cup (West Indies) =

Cricket tournament

- Dates: 18 – 28 February 1976
- Administrator: WICB
- Cricket format: List A (50 overs)
- Tournament format(s): Group stage, final
- Champions: Barbados (2nd title)
- Participants: 6
- Matches: 7
- Most runs: (Barbados) Gordon Greenidge (120)
- Most wickets: (Barbados) Wayne Daniel (7)

The 1975–76 Gillette Cup was the second edition of what is now the Regional Super50, the domestic limited-overs cricket competition for the countries of the West Indies Cricket Board (WICB). Sponsored by Gillette, it was the first season of the competition to carry that name.

Six teams participated – Barbados, Guyana, Jamaica, the Leeward Islands, Trinidad and Tobago, and the Windward Islands. The competition was impacted by rain, with only three of the six scheduled group-stage matches being completed. Barbados were eventually joined by Trinidad and Tobago in the final, going on to defeat their opponent by 43 runs to claim their second domestic one-day title. Two Barbadians, Gordon Greenidge and Wayne Daniel, led the tournament in runs and wickets, respectively.

== Teams ==
| Barbados | Guyana | Jamaica |
|---|---|---|
| David Holford (c); Keith Boyce; Nolan Clarke; Wayne Daniel; Stephen Farmer; Teddy Foster; Gordon Greenidge; Vanburn Holder; Collis King; David Murray; Joseph Newton; Ricardo Skeete; Emmerson Trotman | Steve Camacho (c); Faoud Bacchus; Keith Cameron; Rex Collymore; Colin Croft; Romain Etwaroo; Frederick Hartman; Alvin Kallicharran; Sydney Matthews; Adjodha Persaud; Lonsdale Skinner | Maurice Foster (c); Samuel Allen; Richard Austin; Herbert Chang; Jeff Dujon; Hylton Gordon; Cecil Lawson; Desmond Lewis; Junior Williams; Lyndel Wright; Ray Wynter |
| Leeward Islands | Trinidad and Tobago | Windward Islands |
| Livingstone Sargeant (c); Jim Allen; Michael Camacho; Alford Corriette; Victor Eddy; Hugh Gore; Lipton Griffin; Luther Kelly; Viv Richards; Andy Roberts; Elquemedo Willett | Prince Bartholomew (c); Imtiaz Ali; Desmond Baptiste; Theodore Cuffy; Keith D'Heurieux; Ronald Faria; Larry Gomes; Sheldon Gomes; Bernard Julien; Raphick Jumadeen; Deryck Murray; Dudnath Ramkissoon | Mike Findlay (c); Derek Abraham; Hubert Annibaffa; Earl Fraites; Matthew George; Stanley Hinds; Victor Joseph; Norbert Phillip; Lockhart Sebastien; Grayson Shillingford; Irvine Shillingford |

== Group stage ==
=== North Zone ===
| Team | Pld | W | L | NR | A | Pts | RR |
|---|---|---|---|---|---|---|---|
| Barbados | 2 | 2 | 0 | 0 | 0 | 4 | 3.763 |
| Jamaica | 2 | 0 | 1 | 0 | 1 | 1 | 3.855 |
| Leeward Islands | 2 | 0 | 1 | 0 | 1 | 1 | 3.120 |

18–19 February 1976
Scorecard

| Leeward Islands | v | Jamaica |

Match abandoned
Warner Park, Basseterre

21 February 1976
Scorecard

| Barbados; 187/9 (50 overs) | v | Leeward Islands; 156/9 (50 overs) |

Barbados won by 31 runs
Kensington Oval, Bridgetown

22 February 1976
Scorecard

| Barbados; 146 (38.3 overs) | v | Jamaica; 142 (36.5 overs) |

Barbados won by 4 runs
Kensington Oval, Bridgetown

=== South Zone ===
| Team | Pld | W | L | NR | A | Pts | RR |
|---|---|---|---|---|---|---|---|
| Trinidad and Tobago | 2 | 1 | 0 | 0 | 1 | 3 | 4.282 |
| Guyana | 2 | 0 | 0 | 1 | 1 | 2 | 4.825 |
| Windward Islands | 2 | 0 | 1 | 1 | 0 | 1 | 3.460 |

18–19 February 1976
Scorecard

| Guyana; 78/4 (16.1 overs) | v | Windward Islands |

No result
Victoria Park, Castries

21–22 February 1976
Scorecard

| Windward Islands; 173/9 (50 overs) | v | Trinidad and Tobago; 177/3 (41.2 overs) |

Trinidad and Tobago won by 7 wickets
Queen's Park Oval, Port of Spain

24–25 February 1976
Scorecard

| Guyana | v | Trinidad and Tobago |

Match abandoned
Bourda, Georgetown

== Final ==
28 February 1976
Scorecard

| Barbados; 191 (49.3 overs) | v | Trinidad and Tobago; 148 (39.5 overs) |
| Stephen Farmer 63; Raphick Jumadeen 3/26 | | Theodore Cuffy 36; Wayne Daniel 3/11 |

Barbados won by 43 runs
Kensington Oval, Bridgetown

== See also ==
- 1975–76 Shell Shield season
