= Indian cricket team in England in 1974 =

International cricket tour

The Indian cricket team toured England in the 1974 English domestic cricket season. After matches against many of county cricket and other minor teams, in April and May, the Indian team played three Test matches and two One-day Internationals against the England cricket team. The tour was a total disaster for the Indian cricket team with England winning all five of the matches.

The season became known as the "Summer of 42", referring to the number of runs scored by India in its second innings in the Second Test at Lord's (also a reference to the film Summer of '42 which won an Oscar in 1972; a follow-up, Class of '44 had been released in 1973). Blamed for his team's poor showing, Indian captain Ajit Wadekar retired from Test cricket after the tour.

== Background ==
India could make a fair claim in the early 1970s to be the top Test-playing nation. In 1970–71, the team had beaten the West Indies in the Caribbean; in the English season that followed, 1971, the team had won its first-ever victory on English soil and with it the first series victory in Anglo-Indian Tests in England; and that victory was repeated, with a 2–1 margin, when MCC toured India in 1972–73.

The basis of India's success was the quartet of world-class spin bowlers – Bhagwat Chandrasekhar, Bishen Singh Bedi, Erapalli Prasanna and Srinivas Venkataraghavan – backed up by world-class batting from Sunil Gavaskar and Gundappa Vishwanath. Ajit Wadekar was regarded as an astute captain, while Farokh Engineer was an extrovert wicketkeeper-batsman.

== Test matches ==
=== First Test ===
6–11 June 1974
Scorecard

England	v	India
328/9d (143.3 overs); Keith Fletcher 123* (289); Abid Ali 3/79 (30.3 overs)		246 (84 overs); Sunil Gavaskar 101 (251); Bob Willis 4/64 (24 overs)
213/3d (70 overs); John Edrich 100* (188); Eknath Solkar 1/24 (7 overs)		182 (85.1 overs); Sunil Gavaskar 58 (140); Chris Old 4/20 (16 overs)

England won by 113 runs
Old Trafford, Manchester
Umpires: Dickie Bird (Eng) and David Constant (Eng)

- England won the toss and decided to bat.
- Mike Hendrick (Eng), and Brijesh Patel and Madan Lal (both Ind) made their Test debuts.

In the First Test, played from 6 June to 11 June at Old Trafford, England won the toss and batted first, scoring 328-9 declared, with a century for Keith Fletcher (123). Indian opening batsman Sunil Gavaskar scored 101 in India's reply of 246 all out, assisted by 71 added down the batting order by Abid Ali. England reached 213–3 in their second innings, declaring with John Edrich on 100 not out. India were bowled out a second time for 182, and England won by 113 runs.

=== Second Test ===
20–24 June 1974
Scorecard

England	v	India
629 (182.5 overs); Dennis Amiss 188 (303); Bishan Singh Bedi 6/226 (64.2 overs)		302 (101.5 overs); Farokh Engineer 86 (118); Chris Old 4/67 (21 overs)
		42 f/o (17 overs); Eknath Solkar 18* (17); Chris Old 5/21 (8 overs)

England won by an innings and 285 runs
Lord's, London
Umpires: Arthur Fagg (Eng) and Tom Spencer (Eng)

- England won the toss and decided to bat.
- David Lloyd (Eng) made his debut in Tests.

In the Second Test, played from 21 June to 24 June at Lord's, England again won the toss and batted first, scoring a monumental 629 all out, with centuries for opening batsman Dennis Amiss (188), captain Mike Denness (118), and Tony Greig (106); in addition, John Edrich was out for 96. Indian spin bowler Bishen Bedi took six wickets, but conceded 226 runs in 64.2 overs. In reply, India scored 302 all out. Called to follow on, India were dismissed a second time for only 42, and England won by an innings and 285 runs inside 4 days. Chris Old took 5-21, to add to his 4–67 in the first innings, and Geoff Arnold took 4–19.

=== Third Test ===
4–8 July 1974
Scorecard

India	v	England
165 (59.2 overs); Farokh Engineer 64* (111); Mike Hendrick 4/28 (14.2 overs)		459/2d (140 overs); David Lloyd 214* (396); Erapalli Prasanna 1/101 (35 overs)
216 (67.4 overs); Sudhir Naik 77 (165); Mike Hendrick 3/43 (14.4 overs)

England won by an innings and 78 runs
Edgbaston, Birmingham
Umpires: Bill Alley (Eng) and Charlie Elliott (Eng)

- India won the toss and decided to bat.
- Sudhir Naik (Ind) made his debut in Tests.

In the Third Test, played from 3 July to 8 July at Edgbaston, India won the toss and batted first, scoring 165 all out. Wicket-keeper Farokh Engineer top scored with 64 not out. English reached 459 for 2 declared in reply, with David Lloyd scoring 214 not out, Mike Denness dismissed for exactly 100. India were bowled out for 216 in their second innings, and England won by an innings and 78 runs.

== ODI matches ==
=== First ODI ===
13 July 1974
Scorecard

India; 265 (53.3 overs)	v	England; 266/6 (51.1 overs)
Brijesh Patel 82 (78); Chris Old 3/43 (10.5 overs)		John Edrich 90 (97); Eknath Solkar 2/31 (11 overs)

England won by 4 wickets
Headingley, Leeds
Umpires: Bill Alley (Aus) and Dickie Bird (Eng)
Player of the match: John Edrich (Eng)

- England won the toss and elected to field.
- This was India's first ODI match.
- Robin Jackman (Eng) and the entire Indian team made their debut in ODIs.

The First ODI was played on 13 July at Headingley. England won the toss and put India in to bat. India scored 265 all out, bowled out with 7 balls to bowl. England reached their victory target with 6 wickets down and 23 balls to spare.

=== Second ODI ===
16–17 July 1974
Scorecard

India; 171 (47.3 overs)	v	England; 172/4 (48.5 overs)
Ashok Mankad 44 (61); Chris Old 3/36 (9.3 overs)		Keith Fletcher 55* (79); Abid Ali 1/21 (11 overs)

England won by 6 wickets
The Oval, London
Umpires: Charlie Elliott (Eng) and Arthur Jepson (Eng)
Player of the match: Keith Fletcher (Eng)

- India won the toss and elected to bat.
- Gopal Bose and Ashok Mankad (both Ind) made their ODI debuts.
- Reserve day used. England were 19/1 (7 overs) at the close of the first day.

In the Second ODI, played on 16 July at the Oval, India won the toss and batted. They scored 171 all out in 47.3 overs. England reached their victory target with 4 wickets down and more than 6 overs to spare.

== External sources ==
- Tour home at Cricinfo archive
- Tour home at ESPNcricinfo
- India in British Isles 1974 at CricketArchive (subscription required)

== Annual reviews ==
- Playfair Cricket Annual 1975
- Wisden Cricketers' Almanack 1975
