= Indian cricket team in the West Indies in 1975–76 =

International cricket tour

Indian cricket team in West Indies in 1975–76
- Date: 26 February – 25 April 1976
- Location: (Cricket West Indies) West Indies
- Result: West Indies won the 4-Test series 2–1
Teams
- West Indies: India
Captains
- Clive Lloyd: Bishan Singh Bedi
Most runs
- Viv Richards (556) Clive Lloyd (283) Alvin Kallicharran (237): Sunil Gavaskar (390); Mohinder Amarnath (279); G Viswanath (255)
Most wickets
- Michael Holding (19) Raphick Jumadeen (9) Andy Roberts (6): Bhagwat Chandrasekhar (21); Bishan Singh Bedi (18); Venkataraghavan (8)

The India national cricket team toured the West Indies during the 1975–76 cricket season. They played four Test matches against the West Indian cricket team, with the West Indies winning the series 2–1.

== Series overview ==
This Test Series proved to be very eventful and controversial. In many respects its outcome was shaped by the events that preceded it. Earlier in the 1975/6 Season the West Indies had toured Australia and played a six-Test series that was billed as an unofficial World Championship between the two strongest teams. While many of the West Indian players showed isolated evidence of their prodigious talent, the team as a whole suffered from disunity and ill-discipline and were defeated 5–1. Gordon Greenidge described the tour as a 'collective debacle and a personal nightmare', whilst Michael Holding recalled, 'There was plenty of argument and dissent at meetings and in the dressing room. Well before the end our spirit was broken and we were divided among ourselves'.

Although the West Indies entered the series against India with their confidence shattered, they were assisted by some poor scheduling which entailed their opponents arriving in the Caribbean after a 62-hour flight from New Zealand, where they had just completed a Series, with only two days to rest and prepare before their opening match. India consequently suffered heavy defeats at the hands of Barbados and at Bridgetown in the First Test.

The Second Test at the Queen's Park Oval, Port of Spain ended in a high-scoring draw on a flat wicket where the Indian batsmen felt more at home. The Third Test had been scheduled for Georgetown, Guyana but because of heavy flooding was rearranged to be played in Trinidad again. The experiences of the last match, together with an injury to key fast bowler Andy Roberts persuaded the West Indian selectors to go into the match with 3 specialist spin bowlers: Raphick Jumadeen, Albert Padmore and Imtiaz Ali. Centuries from Viv Richards and Alvin Kallicharran put the West Indies in a strong position and India were set a target of 406 to win the match. Centuries from Gundappa Viswanath and Sunil Gavaskar enabled India to reach this target for the loss of four wickets (two of which were run-outs) and created a new record for the highest ever successful fourth-innings' run chase in a test match (surpassing Australia's 404/3 at Headingley against England in 1948)

For Clive Lloyd this was the final humiliation he was prepared to let his team suffer. He told his spinners after the match, 'Gentlemen, I gave you 400 runs to bowl at and you failed to bowl out the opposition. How many runs must I give you in the future to make sure that you get the wickets?' In fact Lloyd decided to dispense with the use of slow bowlers. He argued that the spinners at his disposal were not of the required quality and he was forced to play them through tradition and the convention that cricket teams always included at least one slow bowler. He felt that West Indian strength lay in their crop of young fast bowlers, and the experiences of his team in Australia had demonstrated how the high-quality, hostile pace attack of Dennis Lillee and Jeff Thomson could intimidate the opposition batting.

Going into the deciding test at Kingston, Jamaica at 1–1, the West Indies duly picked a four-pronged pace attack of Michael Holding, Wayne Daniel, Bernard Julien and Vanburn Holder. The Sabina Park pitch was new with uncertain and variable bounce, however the Indian batsmen played with sound defence to grind out 178–1 at the end of the first day's play. An overnight growth of grass encouraged the West Indian bowlers and they began to attack the Indian batsmen around the wicket, targeting the bodies of the opposition. After Mohinder Amarnath was dismissed by a short-pitched delivery, Viswanath's finger was broken by the delivery from which he was caught, and Brijesh Patel, hit in the face, was forced to retire hurt. Then Anshuman Gaekwad, a tall bespectacled batsman who had batted bravely to reach 81 not out began to show signs of backing away to leg as the onslaught of bouncers continued. After being hit on the glove and on the body he was finally felled by a bouncer which hit him behind the left ear. He had to be taken to hospital.

The Indian captain Bishen Bedi and senior players such as Sunil Gavaskar were incensed by the West Indian tactics. They felt that the umpires could have but had refused to intervene, partly because of crowd pressure. Gavaskar was particularly upset that the local crowd had chanted 'kill him' as Holding had bowled to Gaekwad and had cheered when the Indian batsman had been knocked out. Bedi declared the innings at 306/6, partly out of protest but also because he was not prepared to allow himself and his bowling partner Chandrasekhar, both terrible batsmen, to face the West Indian quicks. The West Indies scored 391 in their first innings, and when India went out to bat again they made a solid start but lost Amarnath, Madan Lal and Venkataraghavan in quick succession to slump to 97/5. At this point Bedi announced that the Indian innings was over. He was without the three batsmen who had been hit in the first innings, and stated that both he and Chandrasekhar had picked up fielding injuries and that consequently 5 Indian batsmen should be recorded as 'absent hurt'. The West Indies were left the formality of scoring 13 runs to record the victory in a Test where they had only taken 11 wickets. According to Michael Holding:

'On that surface it was inevitable that some batsmen would be hit against such a pace-based attack as ours, especially as we adopted the tactic of bowling round the wicket, aiming the ball at their bodies. I was not too keen on this method since it gives the batsman little chance of avoiding a bouncer, but it was 1–1 in the series and we were under extreme public pressure to win'.

According to Wisden the Indian team resembled Napoleon's troops in the retreat from Moscow as they boarded their 'plane home. Official complaints were made by the Indian Cricket Board concerning the West Indian tactics in the final Test but to no avail. After this victory Clive Lloyd developed a strategy based on an attack of four fast bowlers. It was to prove successful in the next series, a three-nil victory over England, and was to provide the foundation for the West Indian dominance of Test Cricket for the next 20 years.

== Test matches ==
=== 1st Test ===
10–13 March 1976
Scorecard

| India | v | West Indies |
| 177 (54.1 overs); Madan Lal 45; David Holford 5/23 (8.1 overs) | | 488/9d (138.5 overs); Viv Richards 142; Bhagwat Chandrasekhar 4/163 (39 overs) |
| 214 (73 overs); Gundappa Viswanath 62; Andy Roberts 3/51 (14 overs) |

West Indies won by an innings and 97 runs
Kensington Oval, Bridgetown
Umpires: Stanton Parris (WI) and Douglas Sang Hue (WI)

- India won the toss and elected to bat.

=== 2nd Test ===
24–29 March 1976
Scorecard

| West Indies | v | India |
| 241 (97 overs); Viv Richards 130; Bishan Singh Bedi 5/82 (34 overs) | | 402/5d (156 overs); Sunil Gavaskar 156; Michael Holding 2/68 (27 overs) |
| 215/8 (124 overs); Clive Lloyd 70; Bishan Singh Bedi 3/44 (36 overs) |

Match drawn
Queen's Park Oval, Port of Spain
Umpires: Ralph Gosein (WI) and Douglas Sang Hue (WI)

- India won the toss and elected to field.

=== 3rd Test ===
7–12 April 1976
Scorecard

| West Indies | v | India |
| 359 (109.2 overs); Viv Richards 177; Bhagwat Chandrasekhar 6/120 (32.2 overs) | | 228 (102.4 overs); Madan Lal 42; Michael Holding 6/65 (26.4 overs) |
| 271/6d (104.3 overs); Alvin Kallicharran 103; S. Venkataraghavan 3/65 (30.3 overs) | | 406/4 (147 overs); Gundappa Viswanath 112; Raphick Jumadeen 2/70 (41 overs) |

India won by 6 wickets
Queen's Park Oval, Port of Spain
Umpires: Ralph Gosein (WI) and Compton Vyfhuis (WI)

- West Indies won the toss and elected to bat.
- Imtiaz Ali and Albert Padmore (WI) made their Test debuts.

=== 4th Test ===
21–25 April 1976
Scorecard

| India | v | West Indies |
| 306/6d (104.2 overs); Anshuman Gaekwad 81; Michael Holding 4/82 (28 overs) | | 391 (140.3 overs); Roy Fredericks 82; Bhagwat Chandrasekhar 5/153 (42 overs) |
| 97 (26.2 overs); Mohinder Amarnath 60; Michael Holding 3/35 (7.2 overs) | | 13/0 (1.5 overs); Roy Fredericks 6 Madan Lal 0/5 (1 over) |

West Indies won by 10 wickets
Sabina Park, Kingston
Umpires: Ralph Gosein (WI) and Douglas Sang Hue (WI)

- West Indies won the toss and elected to field.
- Wayne Daniel (WI) made his Test debut.
