= Rajinder Goel =

Indian cricketer (1942–2020)

Personal information
- Born: 20 September 1942; Narwana, Punjab, British India (now in Haryana, India)
- Died: 21 June 2020 (aged 77); Rohtak, Haryana, India
- Batting: Right-handed
- Bowling: Slow left-arm orthodox
- Role: Bowler
- Relatives: Nitin Goel (son), Akshay Goel (son)

Domestic team information
- Years: Team
- 1958/59: Patiala
- 1959/60–1962/63: Southern Punjab
- 1963/64–1972/73: Delhi
- 1973/74–1984/85: Haryana
- First-class debut: 23 December 1958 Patiala v Services
- Last First-class: 9 March 1985 Haryana v Bombay
- List A debut: 3 October 1974 North Zone v South Zone
- Last List A: 13 March 1985 Haryana v Bengal

Career statistics
Competition	First-class	List A
Matches	157	8
Runs scored	1037	11
Batting average	9.34	5.50
100s/50s	0/0	0/0
Top score	44	5*
Balls bowled	39929	508
Wickets	750	14
Bowling average	18.58	20.00
5 wickets in innings	59	0
10 wickets in match	18	n/a
Best bowling	8/55	4/54
Catches/stumpings	66/–	3/–
- Source: CricketArchive, 30 September 2008

Rajinder Goel (20 September 1942 – 21 June 2020) was an Indian cricketer who holds the record for most wickets in the Ranji Trophy, India's premier first class competition, despite which he was never selected to play for India. A left arm spinner, he represented Patiala, Southern Punjab, Delhi and Haryana in domestic cricket. In 2016, he received the C. K. Nayudu Lifetime Achievement Award, the highest honour conferred by BCCI on a former player.

The son of an assistant station master in the Indian Railways, Goel came up through the Vaish school and college in Rohtak. His first major success was for North Zone schools in 1957 when he took four wickets against West Zone in the final of the All-India schools tournament and was declared the best bowler of the competition. He made his Ranji debut in the next season. Goel credits his early success to his teacher and coach Kishan Dayal. He started his first class career with Patiala, which then evolved into the Southern Punjab team. He moved to Delhi in 1963 and Haryana ten years later.

Goel appeared for India against Ceylon in an unofficial Test at Ahmedabad in 1964-65 where he took 4 for 33 in the second innings. Thereafter, the presence of the "Indian spin quartet", especially Bishen Bedi who bowled in a similar style, restricted his appearances for India. When Bedi was dropped from the team for the Bangalore Test against West Indies in 1974–75 on disciplinary grounds for appearing in a BBC interview, Goel was selected for the Indian team but was excluded at the last moment. He also took 6-102 and 3–43 against the Australians in 1979–80. Goel rated his 12–134 against the South Zone in the final of the 1975-76 Duleep Trophy as his most satisfying performance.

Goel went past V. V. Kumar's Ranji record of 417 wickets in the 1978–79 season. His 600th wicket was Chandrakant Pandit, caught at deep squareleg in the Ranji semifinal against Bombay in 1983–84. He retired after taking 39 wickets in 1984–85 season.

Goel's 637 Ranji wickets is comfortably a record (Note: Indian sources credit Goel with 640 Ranji Trophy wickets. As per CricketArchive, Goel has 637 wickets. According to CricketArchive, Goel's 600th wicket occurred in the match between Haryana and Jammu and Kashmir in the 1984–85 season.)); Srinivas Venkataraghavan with 530 wickets being the next best. He took more than 25 Ranji wickets in a season fifteen times, including in his last nine seasons. Haryana reached the Ranji semi-final thrice during Goel's time but lost on each occasion. Their first appearance in the final happened in the season after his retirement.

Goel is one of two non-Test cricketers, the other being Padmakar Shivalkar, who Sunil Gavaskar chose among his "idols" in his book of the same name. "He is the one bowler whom I have really dreaded facing in my life," he wrote about Goel. "I have never been able to feel comfortable against his left hand spinners and Goel has been one who, because of his flatter trajectory, has not given me the opportunity to step down the track and drive." However, Gavaskar considered Bedi the greater bowler overall.

During his playing days, Goel was employed by the State Bank of India. He later served as a selector for Haryana and the Indian junior teams. His son Nitin Goel was also a first class cricketer for Haryana.
