= 1975–76 Shell Shield season =

Cricket tournament

- Dates: 16 January – 13 February 1976
- Administrator: WICB
- Cricket format: First-class (four-day)
- Tournament format: Round-robin
- Champions: Barbados (5th title); Trinidad and Tobago (3rd title)
- Participants: 5
- Matches: 10
- Most runs: (Dominica) Irvine Shillingford (545)
- Most wickets: (Trinidad and Tobago) Imtiaz Ali (19)

The 1975–76 Shell Shield season was the tenth edition of what is now the Regional Four Day Competition, the domestic first-class cricket competition for the countries of the West Indies Cricket Board (WICB). The tournament was sponsored by Royal Dutch Shell, with matches played from 16 January to 13 February 1976.

Five teams contested the competition – Barbados, the Combined Islands, Guyana, Jamaica, and Trinidad and Tobago. Two teams, Barbados and Trinidad and Tobago, finished equal on 20 points, and shared the title. The competition was marked by a large number of draws, with only two of the ten matches played to completion. Irvine Shillingford of the Combined Islands team was the leading run-scorer, while Trinidad and Tobago's Imtiaz Ali was the leading wicket-taker.

== Points table ==
Team	Pld	W	L	LWF	DWF	DLF	A	Pts
Barbados	4	1	0	0	1	1	1	20
Trinidad and Tobago	4	1	0	1	0	2	0	20
Jamaica	4	0	0	0	3	0	0	18
Combined Islands	4	0	0	0	1	1	0	8
Guyana	4	0	1	0	0	1	1	2
Source: CricketArchive

Key

- W – Outright win (12 points)
- L – Outright loss (0 points)
- LWF – Lost match, but won first innings (4 points)
- DWF – Drawn, but won first innings (6 points)
- DLF – Drawn, but lost first innings (2 points)
- A – Abandoned (0 points)

== Statistics ==
=== Most runs ===
The top five run-scorers are included in this table, listed by runs scored and then by batting average.

Player	Team	Runs	Inns	Avg	Highest	100s	50s
Irvine Shillingford	Combined Islands	257	3	85.66	111	1	2
Larry Gomes	Trinidad and Tobago	213	7	30.42	82*	0	2
Faoud Bacchus	Guyana	211	4	52.75	84	0	2
David Holford	Barbados	207	5	69.00	74*	0	2
Theo Cuffy	Trinidad and Tobago	205	7	29.28	62	0	1

=== Most wickets ===
The top five wicket-takers are listed in this table, listed by wickets taken and then by bowling average.

Player	Team	Overs	Wkts	Ave	5	10	BBI
Imtiaz Ali	Trinidad and Tobago	224.3	19	24.10	1	0	5/44
Prince Bartholomew	Trinidad and Tobago	95.5	14	16.21	0	0	3/32
Raphick Jumadeen	Trinidad and Tobago	196.1	13	22.76	0	0	4/46
Wayne Daniel	Barbados	70.1	12	13.58	1	0	5/34
David Holford	Barbados	94.2	11	16.63	1	0	5/81
