= Indian cricket team in England in 1979 =

International cricket tour

The Indian cricket team toured England in the 1979 season and played 16 first-class fixtures, winning only one, losing 3 and drawing 12.

India played four Test matches and lost the series to England 1-0 with three Tests drawn. England won the First Test at Edgbaston by an innings and 83 runs. The Second Test at Lord's, the Third Test at Headingley and the Fourth Test at The Oval were all drawn.

The Indian team was captained by Srinivasaraghavan Venkataraghavan and included notable players such as Sunil Gavaskar, Gundappa Viswanath, Dilip Vengsarkar, Bhagwat Chandrasekhar and Kapil Dev.

== Test series summary ==
=== First Test ===
12–16 July 1979
Scorecard

England	v	India
633/5 d. (165.2 overs); David Gower 200; Kapil Dev 5/146 (48 overs)		297 (116.1 overs); Gundappa Viswanath 78; Bob Willis 3/69 (24 overs)
		253 (95.4 overs); Sunil Gavaskar 68; Ian Botham 5/70 (29 overs)

England won by an innings and 83 runs
Edgbaston, Birmingham
Umpires: DJ Constant, BJ Meyer

- England won the toss and decided to bat

The England innings of 633/5d is the only example in Test cricket history where three different bowlers conceded 100+ runs and each failed to take a wicket: Srinivasaraghavan Venkataraghavan - 0-107, Karsan Ghavri - 0-129 and Bhagwat Chandrasekhar - 0-113.

=== Second Test ===
2–7 August 1979
Scorecard

India	v	England
96 (55.5 overs); Sunil Gavaskar 42; Ian Botham 5/35 (19 overs)		419/9 d. (129.5 overs); David Gower 82; Kapil Dev 3/93 (38 overs)
318/4 (148 overs); Gundappa Viswanath 113; Phil Edmonds 2/62 (45 overs)

Match drawn
Lord's Cricket Ground
Umpires: HD Bird, KE Palmer

- India won the toss and decided to bat

=== Third Test ===
16–21 August 1979
Scorecard

England	v	India
270 (80.5 overs); Ian Botham 137; Kapil Dev 3/84 (27 overs)		223/6 (110 overs); Sunil Gavaskar 78; Bob Willis 2/42 (18 overs)

Match drawn
Headingley, Leeds
Umpires: HD Bird, BJ Meyer

- England won the toss and decided to bat

=== Fourth Test ===
30 August–4 September 1979
Scorecard

England	v	India
305 (124.5 overs); Graham Gooch 79; Venkataraghavan 3/59 (29 overs)		202 (79.3 overs); Gundappa Viswanath 62; Ian Botham 4/65 (28 overs)
334/8 (116.5 overs); Geoff Boycott 125; Karsan Ghavri 3/76 (34 overs)		429/8 (150.5 overs); Sunil Gavaskar 221; Ian Botham 3/97 (29 overs)

Match drawn
Kennington Oval, Kennington
Umpires: DJ Constant, KE Palmer

- England won the toss and decided to bat

== External sources ==
CricketArchive – tour itineraries

== Annual reviews ==
- Playfair Cricket Annual 1980
- Wisden Cricketers' Almanack 1980
