= Proverb (disambiguation) =

A proverb is a simple and concrete saying popularly known and repeated.

Proverb or Proverbs may also refer to:

- Adages in general
- Pro-verb, the pro-form of a verb
- The Book of Proverbs, a book of the Hebrew Bible and the Christian Old Testament

== People ==
- Proverb Jacobs (1935–2016), American football offensive and defensive lineman
- Roy Proverbs (1932–2017), English professional soccer player
- Gordon Proverbs (born 1924), cricketer for Barbados from 1949 to 1955

== Other uses ==
- Proverb (Reich), a musical composition

== See also ==
- List of proverbs
- Anti-proverb, distortions of proverbs (adages)
- Proverbial name, a type of given name formation in some cultures of Africa
- Netherlandish Proverbs, a painting by Pieter Bruegel the Elder.
