= Golden Bird =

Golden Bird may refer to:

- The Golden Bird, a fairy tale collected by the Brothers Grimm
- The Golden Bird (Berber folktale), a fairy tale collected by Mouloud Mammeri
- The Golden Bird (film), a 2011 film
- Operation Golden Bird, military operation by the Indian Army
