= Proverbial name =

Proverbial name may refer to:

- Archetypal name
- Proverbial name (Africa), a way of personal name formation in some African cultures
