= List of international cricket centuries by Mohammad Azharuddin =

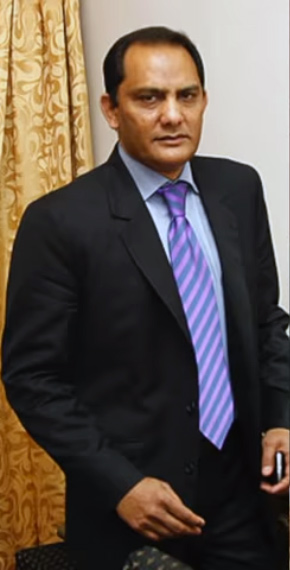

Mohammad Azharuddin is a former international cricketer who represented and captained the India national cricket team. Considered to be one of the greatest batsman to emerge from Indian cricket, he was well known for his "wristy strokeplay". A right-handed middle order batsman, Azharuddin scored 29 international centuries before the Board of Control for Cricket in India (BCCI) accused him of match-fixing in 2000, which marked the end of his cricket career. In a career that spanned 15 years, he played 99 Tests and 334 One Day Internationals (ODI) accumulating 6,215 and 9,378 runs respectively. Azharuddin was the first cricketer to score 9,000 runs in ODI cricket and remained the leading run-scorer until October 2000. (Note: Azharuddin surpassed Desmond Haynes' aggregate of 8,648 runs in November 1998, and held the record for two years when Sachin Tendulkar overtook the total.) He was named the "Indian Cricket Cricketer of the Year" before being included by Wisden as one of their five Cricketers of the Year in 1991.

Azharuddin made his Test and ODI debuts during England's 1984–85 tour of India. In Tests, he made centuries against all nations except West Indies and Zimbabwe. (Note: Bangladesh attained the status of a Test playing nation on 26 June 2000, three months after Azharuddin made his final Test appearance.) In his first Test appearance Azharuddin made 110, thus becoming the eighth Indian player to score a century on debut. With scores of 105 and 122 in the subsequent matches of the series, he became the first player to score a century in each of his first three Tests. Azharuddin equalled the record of Kapil Dev for the fastest century by an Indian in Test cricket, when he scored a century from 74 balls against South Africa in 1996. His highest score of 199 came against Sri Lanka at Kanpur in 1986. Azharuddin's 22 Test centuries were made at fifteen cricket grounds, nine of which were outside India. He scored a century in his last Test innings—against South Africa—in March 2000. As of January 2026, he is joint thirty-first among all-time century makers in Test cricket, (Note: Azharuddin shares the position with Wally Hammond, Colin Cowdrey, AB de Villiers, Geoffrey Boycott and Ian Bell.) and sixth in the equivalent list for India.

Azharuddin's first ODI century came two years after his debut when he made 108 against Sri Lanka. In 1987, he scored a 62-ball century against New Zealand at the Moti Bagh Stadium, Vadodara; (Note: The century was the fastest at that time in terms of balls faced. As of January 2026, it is the eleventh fastest in the format.) the performance ensured India's victory and he was made the man of the match. His highest score of 153 not out was achieved in the later part of his career, against Zimbabwe, during which he was involved in a record partnership of 275 with Ajay Jadeja. (Note: The partnership was the highest for any wicket in ODIs at the time. As of January 2026, it remains the highest for a fourth wicket pair and fifth highest for any wicket.) Azharuddin made scores between 90 and 99 seven times during his ODI career.

== Key ==
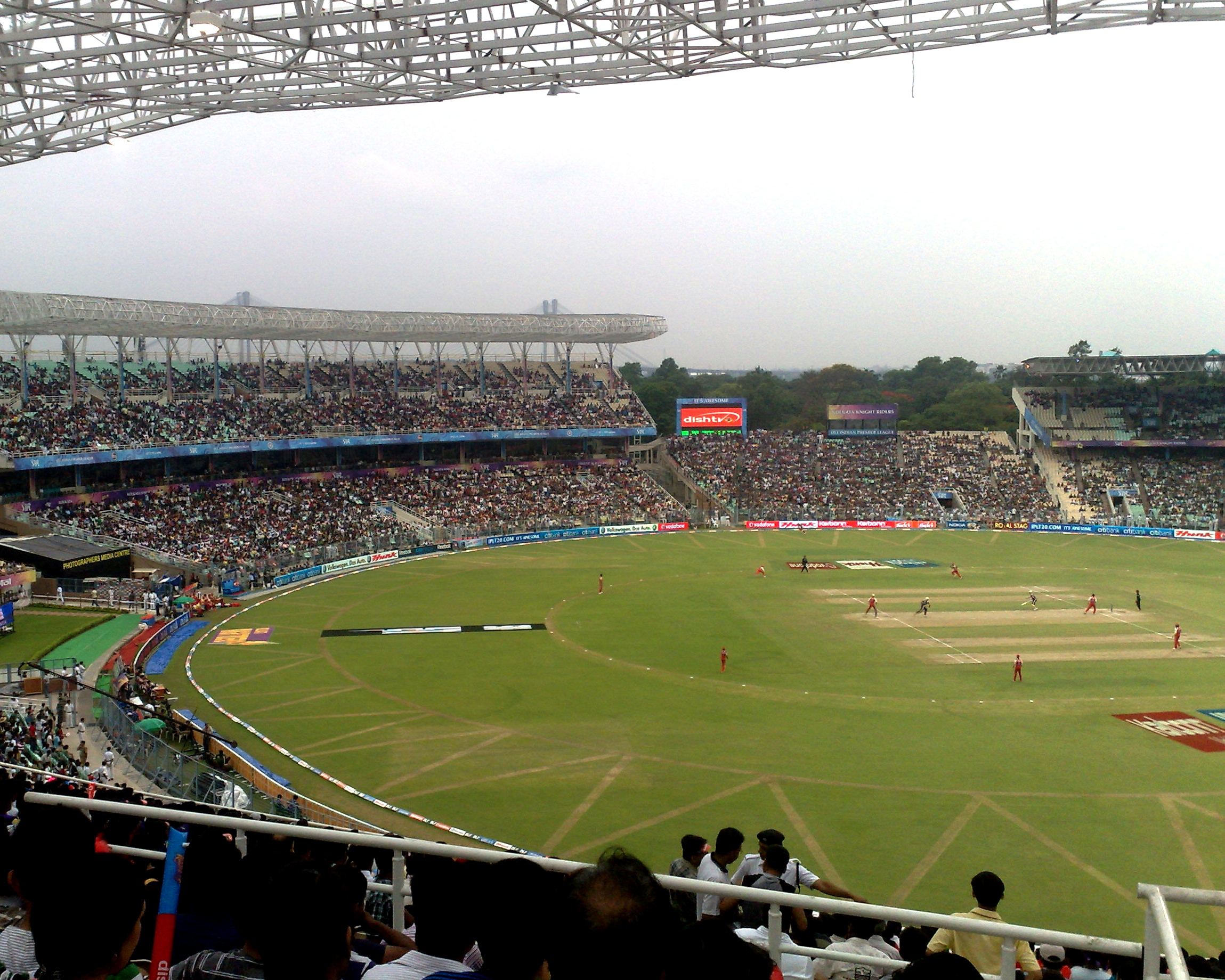
Azharuddin scored his maiden Test century at Eden Gardens; he went on to score four more centuries at the venue.

List of symbols, abbreviations along with their meanings
| Notation | Meaning |
|---|---|
| * | Remained not out |
| † | Captained the Indian cricket team |
| ‡ | Man of the match |
| Balls | Balls faced |
| Pos. | Position in the batting order |
| Inn. | The innings of the match |
| Test | The number of the Test match played in that series |
| S/R | Strike rate during the innings |
| H/A/N | Venue was at home (India), away or neutral |
| Date | Date the match was held, or the starting date of match for Test matches |
| Lost | The match was lost by India. |
| Won | The match was won by India. |
| Drawn | The match was drawn. |

== Test centuries ==
Test centuries by Azharuddin
| No. | Score | Against | Pos. | Inn. | Test | Venue | H/A/N | Date | Result |
|---|---|---|---|---|---|---|---|---|---|
| 1 | 110 | England | 5 | 1 | 3/5 | Eden Gardens, Calcutta (Note: Calcutta was renamed as Kolkata in 2001.) | Home | 31 December 1984 | Drawn |
| 2 | 105 | England | 5 | 3 | 4/5 | M. A. Chidambaram, Madras (Note: Madras was renamed as Chennai in 1996.) | Home | 13 January 1985 | Lost |
| 3 | 122 | England | 3 | 1 | 5/5 | Green Park, Kanpur | Home | 31 January 1985 | Drawn |
| 4 | 199 | Sri Lanka | 5 | 2 | 1/3 | Green Park, Kanpur | Home | 17 December 1986 | Drawn |
| 5 | 141 | Pakistan | 5 | 1 | 2/5 | Eden Gardens, Calcutta | Home | 11 February 1987 | Drawn |
| 6 | 110 | Pakistan | 5 | 1 | 3/5 | Sawai Mansingh, Jaipur | Home | 21 February 1987 | Drawn |
| 7 | 109 | Pakistan | 4 | 3 | 2/4 | Iqbal Stadium, Faisalabad | Away | 23 November 1989 | Drawn |
| 8 | 192 † | New Zealand | 5 | 2 | 3/3 | Eden Park, Auckland | Away | 22 February 1990 | Drawn |
| 9 | 121 | England | 5 | 2 | 1/3 | Lord's Cricket Ground, London | Away | 26 July 1990 | Lost |
| 10 | 179 † | England | 5 | 2 | 2/3 | Old Trafford Cricket Ground, Manchester | Away | 9 August 1990 | Drawn |
| 11 | 106 † | Australia | 6 | 4 | 4/5 | Adelaide Oval, Adelaide | Away | 25 January 1992 | Lost |
| 12 | 182 ‡ † | England | 5 | 1 | 1/3 | Eden Gardens, Calcutta | Home | 29 January 1993 | Won |
| 13 | 108 ‡ † | Sri Lanka | 5 | 1 | 2/3 | M. Chinnaswamy Stadium, Bangalore | Home | 26 January 1994 | Won |
| 14 | 152 ‡ † | Sri Lanka | 5 | 2 | 3/3 | Sardar Patel Stadium, Ahmedabad | Home | 8 February 1994 | Won |
| 15 | 109 | South Africa | 5 | 2 | 2/3 | Eden Gardens, Calcutta | Home | 27 November 1996 | Lost |
| 16 | 163* ‡ | South Africa | 6 | 3 | 3/3 | Green Park Stadium, Kanpur | Home | 8 December 1996 | Won |
| 17 | 115 | South Africa | 7 | 2 | 2/3 | Newlands Cricket Ground, Cape Town | Away | 2 January 1997 | Lost |
| 18 | 126 | Sri Lanka | 5 | 1 | 1/2 | R. Premadasa Stadium, Colombo | Away | 2 August 1997 | Drawn |
| 19 | 108* | Sri Lanka | 5 | 4 | 2/2 | Singhalese Sports Club Cricket Ground, Colombo | Away | 9 August 1997 | Drawn |
| 20 | 163* † | Australia | 5 | 2 | 2/3 | Eden Gardens, Calcutta | Home | 18 March 1998 | Won |
| 21 | 103* † | New Zealand | 6 | 1 | 2/2 | Basin Reserve, Wellington | Away | 26 December 1998 | Lost |
| 22 | 102 | South Africa | 5 | 3 | 2/2 | M. Chinnaswamy Stadium, Bangalore | Home | 2 March 2000 | Lost |

== ODI centuries ==
One Day International centuries by Azharuddin
| No. | Score | Balls | Against | Pos. | Inn. | S/R | Venue | H/A/N | Date | Result |
|---|---|---|---|---|---|---|---|---|---|---|
| 1 | 108* | 94 | Sri Lanka | 3 | 1 | 114.89 | Wankhede Stadium, Bombay (Note: Bombay was renamed as Mumbai in 1995.) | Home | 17 January 1987 | Won |
| 2 | 108* ‡ | 65 | New Zealand | 6 | 2 | 166.15 | Moti Bagh Stadium, Vadodara | Home | 17 December 1988 | Won |
| 3 | 108 † | 116 | Sri Lanka | 4 | 1 | 93.10 | Sharjah Cricket Association Stadium, Sharjah | Neutral | 25 April 1990 | Lost |
| 4 | 111* | 117 | Sri Lanka | 5 | 2 | 94.87 | R. Premadasa Stadium, Colombo | Away | 17 August 1997 | Lost |
| 5 | 100 † | 111 | Pakistan | 3 | 1 | 90.09 | Sher-e-Bangla National Cricket Stadium, Dhaka | Neutral | 11 January 1998 | Won |
| 6 | 153* ‡ † | 150 | Zimbabwe | 4 | 1 | 102.00 | Barabati Stadium, Cuttack | Home | 9 April 1998 | Won |
| 7 | 101 † | 111 | Pakistan | 4 | 1 | 90.99 | Toronto Cricket, Skating and Curling Club, Toronto | Neutral | 20 September 1998 | Lost |
