= Derek Abraham =

Dominican cricketer (born 1953)

Personal information
- Born: 7 February 1953 (age 73); Roseau, Dominica
- Batting: Left-handed
- Bowling: Left-arm orthodox Left-arm medium

International information
- National side: Canada (1982–1986)

Domestic team information
- Years: Team
- 1973–1976: Windward Islands (West Indies)
- Source: CricketArchive, 8 March 2016

Derek Abraham (born 7 February 1953) is a former international cricketer who represented the Canadian national team in the 1980s. He was born in Dominica, and before emigrating to Canada represented the Windward Islands in West Indian domestic cricket.

Abraham made his first-class debut for the Windwards in July 1973, against the Leeward Islands. He made three more first-class appearances over the following seasons, including against the touring Indians in February 1976. He also represented the team in the 1975–76 Gillette Cup, a limited-overs tournament. Having emigrated to Canada, Abraham made his international debut at the 1982 ICC Trophy in England, although he played in only two of his team's seven matches. At the 1986 ICC Trophy, however, he played every game for Canada, and finished with a team-high 14 wickets (ranking him equal ninth overall). Against the United States he took 4/27, while against Gibraltar he took 5/9. Abraham had begun his career as a slow left-arm orthodox bowler, but later switched to bowling medium-pace, even opening the bowling for Canada in some matches.
