= K. N. Prabhu =

Indian sports journalist

K. Niran Prabhu (1923 – 30 July 2006) was a prominent Indian journalist who specialized in cricket. Most of his best work was done while working for the Times of India newspaper. He joined the paper in 1948 and was the sports editor from 1959 to 1983. None of his works have been published as books.

In 1997, BCCI had honoured him with the C. K. Nayudu Lifetime Achievement Award, one of the most prestigious honours in Indian cricket. He is the only sports journalist to have received the award — normally given to cricket players — till date. He and his wife, who predeceased him by two years, had a daughter and a son. After his death the Press Club Mumbai instituted the K N Prabhu Award for Excellence in Cricket Writing in his honour. Partab Ramchand wrote of Prabhu in 2001 as follows:

KN Prabhu has been one of the leading cricket writers in the country for over half a century now and still continues to wield a facile pen in his late 70s. Indeed, many leading Indian cricketers are confessed fans of Prabhu, who in his heyday had a following second to none. His lucid comments always carried the stamp of class, he wrote with a lot of feeling about the game he loved and his constructive criticism was always heard by those in authority.
