= Castrol Awards for Cricketing Excellence =

Initiated in 1997–98, the Castrol Awards for Cricketing Excellence recognizes outstanding performances by Indian cricketers - past, present and future.

== Awards ==
=== 2011-2007 ===
	2011	2010	2009	2008	2007
Castrol Indian Cricketer of the Year	Mahendra Singh Dhoni	Sachin Tendulkar		Gautam Gambhir	
Castrol Test Cricketer of the Year	Rahul Dravid	Sachin Tendulkar		Virender Sehwag	
Castrol ODI Cricketer of the Year	Suresh Raina	Mahendra Singh Dhoni		Mahendra Singh Dhoni	
Castrol Indian Batsman of the Year	Sachin Tendulkar	Virendra Sehwag		Gautam Gambhir	
Castrol Indian Bowler of the Year	Ravichandran Ashwin	Harbhajan Singh		Harbhajan Singh	
Castrol Life Time Achievement Award	Ajit Wadekar	Mohinder Amarnath			
Castrol Junior Cricketer of the Year	Unmukt Chand	Jaydev Unadkat			

=== 2006-2002 ===
	2006	2005	2004	2003	2002
Castrol Indian Cricketer of the Year			Sachin Tendulkar	Sachin Tendulkar	Rahul Dravid
Castrol Test Cricketer of the Year					
Castrol ODI Cricketer of the Year					
Castrol Indian Batsman of the Year					
Castrol Indian Bowler of the Year					
Castrol Life Time Achievement Award		Erapalli Prasanna	Kapil Dev	Sunil Gavaskar	
Castrol Junior Cricketer of the Year					

=== 2001-1998 ===
	2001	2000	1999	1998
Castrol Indian Cricketer of the Year	Sachin Tendulkar	Sachin Tendulkar	Rahul Dravid	Sachin Tendulkar
Castrol Test Cricketer of the Year				
Castrol ODI Cricketer of the Year				
Castrol Indian Batsman of the Year				
Castrol Indian Bowler of the Year				
Castrol Life Time Achievement Award		Vijay Hazare		
Castrol Junior Cricketer of the Year	Ajay Ratra	Yuvraj Singh	Rajesh Pawar	Jyoti Yadav

== Special awards ==
- 2010

Rahul Dravid – Highest number of catches in Test matches

Yusuf Pathan – Impact Cricketer

== Awarding Methodology ==
=== Castrol Indian Cricketer of the Year Award ===
The winner is selected through a process that has two stages.

In the first stage, performances by Indians in Tests and one-day internationals in the Castrol Cricket Year are rated in the following categories: Aggregate - Tests / ODIs; Wickets - Tests / ODIs; Batting average – Tests / ODIs; Bowling average - Tests / ODIs; Catches taken - Tests / ODIs. Points are then allotted to each player in each of the categories in descending order. Thus, the highest scorer in tests gets 10 points, the second-highest gets 9 points, the third-highest gets 8 and so on. Similarly, the highest scorer in one-day internationals gets 10 points, the second highest gets 9 and so on. The same holds for the other categories.

At the end of the Castrol Year, the aggregate of the points gained by every player in all ten categories is computed and the players with the top five aggregates are declared the nominees for the Castrol Indian Cricketer of the Year Award.

In the second stage, a 'ballot form' comprising the names of the five nominees and a summary of their performances in tests and one-day internationals (with stats) is sent to all the living cricketers who have represented India in at least one test or five one-day internationals. They are asked to 'vote' for one of the five nominees and the player who receives the highest number of votes is declared the winner. The voting is by secret ballot and is monitored by Professional Management Group.

In 2010 and 2011, Sachin Tendulkar and MS Dhoni respectively received the Castrol Indian Cricketer of the Year award. The award does not include a direct monetary component, but has been regarded as a recognition of a player's performance and public profile.

=== Castrol Junior Cricketer of the Year ===
Performances of under-19 cricketers in under-19 / under-17 / under-15 level tournaments in the CASTROL Year are taken into account, as also performances in the Ranji Trophy by cricketers from this age-group. Maximum weightage is given to cricketers who have represented India in international junior-level tournaments like the Under-19 World Cup / Asia Cup or have been part of the India 'A' team on overseas tours.

Performances are scrutinized and a list of 15 players is sent to a panel of judges who have been associated with junior cricket. They are asked to recommend five nominees for the award and then pick one from among the five whom they feel deserves the award the most.

=== Lifetime achievement award ===
This award is presented to a personality who has brought laurels to Indian cricket with consistent and outstanding performances that earned him the adulation of the countrymen and respect of his opponents.
