= Junior Williams (cricketer) =

Jamaican cricketer

Personal information
- Full name: Junior Alfred Williams
- Born: 1 June 1950 (age 76); Trelawny, Jamaica
- Batting: Right-handed
- Bowling: Right-arm fast-medium

Domestic team information
- Years: Team
- 1974/75–1982/83: Jamaica
- 1980: Lincolnshire
- 1981/82: Wellington

Career statistics
Competition	First-class	List A
Matches	26	17
Runs scored	281	40
Batting average	10.40	8.00
100s/50s	–/–	–/–
Top score	33	12*
Balls bowled	3,842	887
Wickets	52	26
Bowling average	36.34	17.11
5 wickets in innings	–	–
10 wickets in match	–	–
Best bowling	4/26	4/30
Catches/stumpings	1/–	3/–
- Source: Cricinfo, 16 February 2019

Junior Alfred Williams (born 1 June 1950) is a Jamaican former first-class cricketer.

== Career ==
Williams was born at Trelawny Parish. He made his debut in first-class cricket for Jamaica against Trinidad and Tobago in the 1974-75 Shell Shield at Montego Bay. The following season he made his debut in List A one-day cricket for Jamaica in the 1975–76 Gillette Cup against Barbados at Bridgetown. He played minor counties cricket for Lincolnshire in 1980, making four appearances in the Minor Counties Championship. He toured Pakistan with an International XI cricket team in September–October 1981, playing in two first-class matches and three List A matches.

Following the tour, he played first-class and List A cricket in New Zealand for Wellington, playing in seven first-class in the 1981–82 Shell Trophy, and five List A matches in the 1981-82 Shell Cup. Wellington won both of these competitions. Returning to Jamaica, he featured in three further first-class matches for Jamaica, alongside two further List A appearances, all during the 1982/83 season. Williams played in 26 first-class matches as a right-arm fast-medium bowler, taking a total of 52 wickets at an average of 36.34, with best figures of 4 for 26. In List A cricket he made seventeen appearances, taking 26 wickets at an average of 17.11, with best figures of 4 for 30.
