= The Golden Bird (film) =

2011 film

- Directed by: Amit Dutta
- Written by: Amit Dutta
- Produced by: Pranav Ashar
- Starring: Nitin Goel
- Cinematography: Prahlad Gopakumar
- Release date: 1 September 2011 (Venice)
- Running time: 55 minutes
- Country: India
- Language: Hindi

The Golden Bird (Hindi: Sonchidi) is a 2011 Indian science fiction film directed by Amit Dutta. It was screened at the 68th Venice International Film Festival.

== Cast ==
- Nitin Goel
- Gagan Singh Sethi
