= Polly Umrigar =

Indian cricketer

Personal information
- Full name: Pahlan Ratanji Umrigar
- Born: 28 March 1926; Bombay or Solapur, Maharashtra (see)
- Died: 7 November 2006 (aged 80); Mumbai, Maharashtra, India
- Batting: Right-handed
- Bowling: Right-arm offbreak
- Role: All-rounder

International information
- National side: India
- Test debut (cap 47): 9 December 1948 v West Indies
- Last Test: 13 April 1962 v West Indies

Career statistics
Competition	Test	First-class
Matches	59	243
Runs scored	3,631	16,155
Batting average	42.22	52.28
100s/50s	12/14	49/80
Top score	223	252*
Balls bowled	4,725	25,297
Wickets	35	325
Bowling average	42.08	25.68
5 wickets in innings	2	14
10 wickets in match	0	2
Best bowling	6/74	7/32
Catches/stumpings	33/–	217/–
- Source: CricInfo, 31 October 2021

Pahlan Ratanji "Polly" Umrigar (28 March 1926 – 7 November 2006) was an Indian cricketer. He played in the Indian cricket team (1948 – 1962) and played first-class cricket for Bombay and Gujarat. Umrigar played mainly as a middle-order batsman but also bowled occasional medium pace and off spin. He captained India in eight Test matches from 1955 to 1958. When he retired in 1962, he had played in the most Tests (59), scored the most Test runs (3,631), and recorded the most Test centuries (12) of any Indian player. He scored the first double century by an Indian in Test cricket against New Zealand in Hyderabad. In 1998, he received the C. K. Nayudu Lifetime Achievement Award, the highest honour the Indian cricket board can bestow on a former player.

== Early life ==
Polly Umrigar was probably born in Bombay but his place of birth is often cited as Solapur, Maharashtra. His father ran a clothing company. He grew up in Solapur and his family moved to Bombay when he was at school.

He was a Parsi (from the Zoroastrian community in India), the community that dominated Bombay cricket in the early decades of the twentieth century. He made his first class debut for Parsis at the age of 18 in the Bombay Pentangular in 1944, and studied for a BSc at St Xavier's College. He captained the Bombay University team. He also played hockey and football competitively.

== Career ==
=== Early Test career ===
He scored 115* for Combined Universities against the touring West Indians in October 1948. This performance brought him to national attention, and earned him a single appearance in the 2nd Test against the same team in Bombay seven weeks later.

By the time two Commonwealth teams visited India in 1949–50 and 1950–51, Umrigar had become a regular in the team. He scored 276 runs in the unofficial Tests against the first team and 562 runs against the second. In the Madras Test, he moved from 90 to 102 with two successive sixes off Frank Worrell.

He scored only 113 runs in the first four Tests against a weak England side at home a year later. He was dropped from the fifth Test but was included at the last minute due to an injury to Hemu Adhikari. Going in at No.7, he made 130 not out as India won their first ever Test match. Though the bowling was not of a very high quality, Umrigar considered it the best innings of his life.

=== England in 1952 ===
In England in 1952, Umrigar scored heavily outside Test matches, but in Tests he was a complete failure. His aggregate of 1,688 was the highest in the season for the Indian team. He made more than 800 runs in May and double hundreds against Oxford University, Lancashire and Kent, but seemed to struggle against the fast bowler Cuan McCarthy of Cambridge. However, he made only 43 runs in seven Test innings, at an average of 6.14. But more than the lack of runs, it was the way that he batted that was disturbing. While facing Fred Trueman, time and again he backed away towards square leg and "(held) the bat out to each ball, missing it like a beginner". Bedser dismissed him twice; Trueman dismissed him four times, and on three occasions he was bowled backing away.

More has perhaps been written about this series than any other phase of Umrigar's career. Umrigar had far more success in his other encounters with fast bowlers. He scored a hundred at Manchester in his next meeting with Trueman in 1959; he topped the aggregate for India in all his three series against West Indies who at various times had Frank King, Wes Hall, Roy Gilchrist and Charlie Stayers. It was off the bowling of Hall and Stayers that he played one of the finest innings of his career.

He returned to form against Pakistan at home in 1952–53, and scored 560 runs in West Indies in early 1953 with two hundreds and four fifties. He reached his hundred at Port of Spain with a six off Sonny Ramadhin. His innings of 223 against New Zealand at Hyderabad in 1955–56 was the first double century scored for India.

=== Test captain ===
Umrigar had led India in two unofficial Tests against the Commonwealth XI in 1953–54 winning one of them. From the second Test match against New Zealand in 1955–56 till the first Test against the West Indies three years later, he captained the side in eight successive Test matches. India won two of the New Zealand Tests by an innings.

After one Test against the West Indies in 1958–59, he was replaced as captain by Ghulam Ahmed who then announced his retirement from Test cricket after two successive defeats. Umrigar was again picked as captain for the fourth Test at Madras, but a confusion developed about the replacements for Ghulam Ahmed and Vijay Manjrekar, who was injured. Umrigar wanted another batsman, Manohar Hardikar, to replace Manjrekar, but Ratibhai Patel, the President of BCCI insisted on the off-spinner Jasu Patel to play in his place. Umrigar resigned the captaincy on the night before the Test. He represented India for three more years but never again captained the country. His 337 runs in the five Tests of the series was the highest for India.

=== Late Test career ===
During the tour of England in 1959, he again scored heavily outside Test matches, but struggled in the Tests again Trueman and Brian Statham until the fourth Test. He scored three double hundreds in tour matches, the 252* against Cambridge University was then the highest by an Indian abroad. He made 230 runs in four Test matches, including 118 in the Old Trafford Test in his last meeting with Trueman.

Umrigar's off-spin played a significant supporting role to Jasu Patel in India's first win over Australia at Kanpur in 1959–60, but his batting remained below par, and he missed the last two Tests in the series with a back injury. He scored three hundreds in the series against Pakistan in 1960–61 and another against England at home in 1961–62 (his third century in as many Test innings).

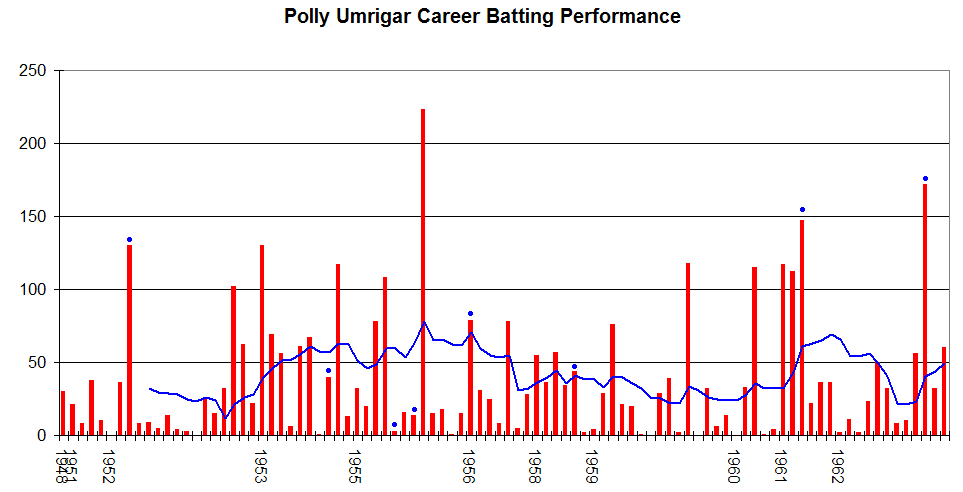
Polly Umrigar's career performance graph.

A few weeks later, India lost every match in a five Test series in West Indies. In the fourth Test at Port of Spain, Umrigar scored 56 and 172 not out and took 5 for 107 in the West Indian first innings. His fifty in the first innings came after India had lost their first five wickets for 30. India followed on and Umrigar reached his hundred in 156 minutes and 150 in 203. When Wes Hall took the second new ball, Umrigar hit him for four fours in an over. The last two Indian wickets added 144. Umrigar's 172* in 248 minutes were scored off India's last 230 runs. He finished the series with 445 runs and nine wickets. His chronic back trouble made him announce his retirement from Test cricket after he returned home.

Umrigar continued to play first-class cricket for Bombay for another season and played his last first class match in 1967–68.

=== Analysis of cricket career ===
Umrigar was a powerfully built man who stood just under six feet. An attacking player especially strong in front of the wicket, he was capable of destroying anything short of extreme pace. In this attitude towards the bowling, he was different from most of his contemporaries. "He was a link between two generations", wrote K. N. Prabhu. "Theoretically he belonged to that assembly of cricketers of the thirties, but in practice his cricket was conditioned by the hard, professional approach of the immediate post-independence years". From the early 1940s, Indian cricket had been dominated by the Merchant-Hazare school of batsmanship which put stress on preserving one's wicket. Umrigar's batting combined the tall scores of this era with the adventurous spirit of the thirties.

Umrigar's bowling improved over the course of his career. He bowled off-cutters, hardly flighted the ball and moved it in off the seam. Occasionally he used to bowl medium pace and open the bowling, as at Bahawalpur in 1954–55 when he took his career-best 6 for 74 against Pakistan. Umrigar rarely bowled for long spells at medium pace. At Bahawalpur he only bowled about six overs "at the maximum pace that he was capable of, which would be about Ramchand's" (the wickets were taken in later spells), according to Sujit Mukherjee. (See the article on G. S. Ramchand for Mukherjee's opinion about Ramchand's bowling.)

Umrigar's aggregate of 3,631 Test runs and 12 Test centuries were India's best until bettered by Sunil Gavaskar in the late seventies. He led the victorious Bombay sides in Ranji Trophy in 1959–60, 1960–61 and 1962–63. In 59 Ranji matches, for Bombay and Gujarat, he scored 4102 runs with fifteen hundreds at an average of 70.72 and 140 wickets. His highest Ranji score of 245 was made against Saurashtra in 1957–58. He twice scored 1,000 runs in an Indian domestic season. He also spent a few years for Church in the Lancashire League.

== Later life ==
Umrigar was the manager of Indian touring sides to New Zealand, West Indies and Australia in the late 1970s. He was the chairman of the national selection committee between 1978 and 1982, Executive secretary of the BCCI and the Mumbai Cricket Association Secretary. He wrote a book on cricket coaching and, for a time, he was the curator of the pitch at the Wankhede Stadium. He was awarded the Padma Shri in 1962 and the C.K. Nayudu Trophy in 1998–99 for his contributions to the game. The national Under-15 championship is contested for the Polly Umrigar Trophy.

Umrigar was diagnosed with lymph cancer and underwent chemotherapy in mid-2006. He died in Mumbai from the illness on 7 November 2006.

He married his wife, Dinu, in 1951. He was survived by his wife, two sons and a daughter.

== Legacy ==
The BCCI named the annual Polly Umrigar Award, for India's international cricketer of the year, in his honour.

== Notes ==
Preceded by Ghulam Ahmed	Indian national cricket captain 1955/6 – 1958-9	Succeeded by Ghulam Ahmed
