= New Zealand cricket team in India in 1976–77 =

International cricket tour

New Zealand cricket team in India in 1976-77
- Date: 10 November 1976 - 30 November 1976
- Location: India
- Result: India won 3 Match -Test series 2-0-1
Teams
- India: New Zealand
Captains
- Bishan Singh Bedi: Glenn Turner
Most runs
- Viswanath (324) Sunil Gavaskar (259) Mohinder Amarnath (229): Glenn Turner (261); John Parker (209); Mark Burgess (175)
Most wickets
- Bishan Singh Bedi (22) Chandrasekhar (17) Venkataraghavan (11): Richard Hadlee (13); Peter Petherick (9); Lance Cairns (7)

The New Zealand national cricket team toured India in 1976–77 season. Three Tests were played, India winning the series 2–0.

== Test matches ==
=== 1st Test ===
10–15 November 1976
scorecard

India	v	New Zealand
399 (142.5 overs); Sunil Gavaskar 119; Richard Hadlee 4/95 (29 overs)		298 (153.3 overs); John Parker 104; Bhagwat Chandrasekhar 4/77 (44 overs)
202/4 d. (58 overs); Brijesh Patel 82; Richard Collinge 2/45 (12 overs)		141 (80.2 overs); Warren Lees 42; Bishan Singh Bedi 5/27 (33 overs)

India won by 162 runs
Wankhede Stadium, Bombay
Umpires: J Reuben, B Satyaji Rao

- India won the toss and decided to bat

=== 2nd Test ===
18–23 November 1976
scorecard

India	v	New Zealand
524/9 d. (168 overs); Mohinder Amarnath 70; Peter Petherick 3/109 (45 overs)		350 (142.5 overs); Glenn Turner 113; Bishan Singh Bedi 3/80 (41 overs)
208/2 d. (52 overs); Gundappa Viswanath 103; Richard Hadlee 2/56 (15 overs)		193/7 (117 overs); Warren Lees 49; Bishan Singh Bedi 3/42 (40 overs)

Match drawn
Modi Stadium, Kanpur
Umpires: MV Nagendra, MS Sivasankariah

- India won the toss and decided to bat

India's first innings is still the highest innings in Test match history that does not feature an individual century by a batsman.

=== 3rd Test ===
26 Nov-2 Dec 1976
scorecard

India	v	New Zealand
298 (133.1 overs); Gundappa Viswanath 87; Lance Cairns 5/55 (33.1 overs)		140 (55.4 overs); Mark Burgess 40; Bishan Singh Bedi 5/48 (16.4 overs)
201/5 d. (61.5 overs); Mohinder Amarnath 55; Richard Hadlee 2/52 (17 overs)		143 (67 overs); John Parker 38; Bishan Singh Bedi 4/22 (22 overs)

India won by 216 runs
Madras Cricket Club Ground, Chepauk, Madras
Umpires: MI Ghouse, KB Ramaswami

- India won the toss and decided to bat
