= C. K. Nayudu Lifetime Achievement Award =

Sporting honour for lifetime achievement in Indian cricket

- Awarded for: Lifetime Achievement in Indian cricket
- Sponsored by: Board of Control for Cricket in India
- First award: 1994
- Final award: 2025

Highlights
- First winner: Lala Amarnath
- Last winner: Rahul Dravid; Roger Binny

The Colonel C. K. Nayudu Lifetime Achievement Award is an award presented by the Board of Control for Cricket in India (BCCI) to individuals who provided unparalleled contribution to Indian cricket. It is the highest honour bestowed by BCCI on a former player and is considered as one of the most prestigious awards in cricket. The award includes a trophy, citation, and cash prize of ₹25 lakh.

The award is named after Colonel C. K. Nayudu (1895–1967), India's first Test cricket captain widely regarded as 'India's first cricket superstar' with a first-class career spanning over 47 years from 1916 to 1963 — a world record.

Nayudu's teammate and India's first test centurion, Lala Amarnath was the first recipient of the award in 1994. K. N. Prabhu is the only sports journalist to have won the award. Rajinder Goel, Padmakar Shivalkar, and B. B. Nimbalkar are the only non-Test cricketers to have been honoured. Lala Amarnath and Mohinder Amarnath are the only father-son duo to have received the honour. Sachin Tendulkar is the most recent recipient of the award.

== Recipients ==
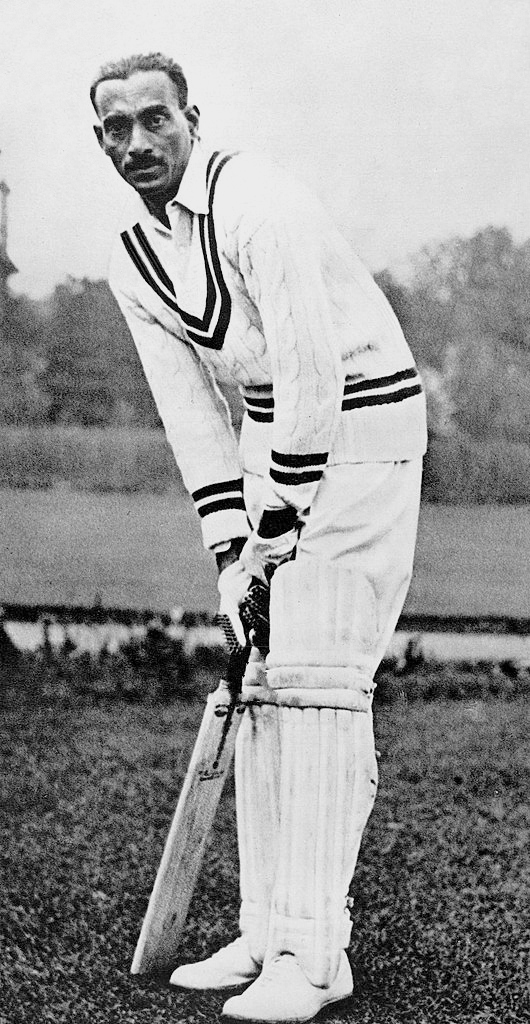
C. K. Nayudu, after whom the award is named

Col C. K. Nayudu Lifetime Achievement Award winners
Year	Recipient	Image	Ref
1994	Lala Amarnath		
1995	Syed Mushtaq Ali		
1996	Vijay Hazare		
1997	K. N. Prabhu		
1998	Polly Umrigar		
1999	Hemu Adhikari		
2000	Subhash Gupte		
2001	Mansoor Ali Khan Pataudi		
2002	B. B. Nimbalkar		
2003	Chandu Borde		
2004	Bishan Singh Bedi		
2004	Srinivasaraghavan Venkataraghavan		
2004	E. A. S. Prasanna		
2004	B. S. Chandrasekhar		
2007	Nari Contractor		
2008	Gundappa Viswanath		
2009	Mohinder Amarnath		
2010	Salim Durani		
2011	Ajit Wadekar		
2012	Sunil Gavaskar		
2013	Kapil Dev		
2014	Dilip Vengsarkar		
2015	Syed Kirmani		
2016	Rajinder Goel		
2016	Padmakar Shivalkar		
2017	Pankaj Roy		
2018	Anshuman Gaekwad		
2019	Krishnamachari Srikkanth		
2023	Farokh Engineer		
2023	Ravi Shastri		
2024	Sachin Tendulkar		
2025	Rahul Dravid		
2025	Roger Binny		
