= Wilfred Farmer =

Barbadian cricketer

Personal information
- Full name: Wilfred Arthur Farmer
- Born: 7 October 1921; Clifden, St John, Barbados
- Died: 25 February 1975 (aged 53); Bridgetown, Barbados
- Batting: Right-handed
- Relatives: Stephen Farmer (son)

Domestic team information
- Years: Team
- 1946–47 to 1958: Barbados

Career statistics
Competition	First-class
Matches	9
Runs scored	663
Batting average	51.00
100s/50s	2/3
Top score	275
Balls bowled	–
Wickets	–
Bowling average	–
5 wickets in innings	–
10 wickets in match	–
Best bowling	–
Catches/stumpings	3/–
- Source: Cricinfo, 12 July 2018

Wilfred Arthur Farmer (7 October 1921 – 25 February 1975) was a Barbadian cricketer who played first-class cricket for Barbados from 1947 to 1958. He was later Deputy Commissioner of Police in Barbados.

Wilfred Farmer attended The Lodge School in Barbados. Before a back injury curtailed his bowling he was a fast bowler, but as a batsman he was a formidable hitter of sixes. The best of his cricket career came in two matches against Jamaica in January 1952. In the first match, captaining Barbados, he went to the crease at 101 for 1 and scored 275 in eight hours, putting on 152 with Cammie Smith for the second wicket, 111 with Conrad Hunte for the third, 198 with Gordon Proverbs for the fourth, and 60 with Cecil Williams for the fifth before he was out with the score at 621 for five. Barbados were all out for 753 at the end of the second day, and went on to win the match by an innings. In the second match, which began two days after the first one ended, he made 107, the only century in the match, and Barbados won by 223 runs.

He later served as Deputy Commissioner of Police in Barbados, and also served in senior positions in the police forces of Trinidad and Tobago and St Lucia. He was awarded the Queen's Police Medal in 1963. His friendship and persuasion led the young Gary Sobers to join the Police Boys' Club and its cricket team in the early 1950s, where Sobers soon excelled and forced his way into the Barbados team.

His son Stephen played for Barbados in the 1970s and became a QC.
