= Venkataraghavan =

Venkataraghavan is a surname of Indian origin. Notable people with the surname include:

- Gayathri Venkataraghavan (born before 1993), Indian singer in the Carnatic tradition
- Srinivasaraghavan Venkataraghavan (born 1945), Indian international cricketer

Fictional characters:

- Kevin Venkataraghavan, character in the television series How I Met Your Mother
