= Gordon Proverbs =

Barbadian cricketer (1924–2019)

Personal information
- Full name: Nigel Gordon Proverbs
- Born: 22 May 1924; Flint Hall, Saint Michael, Barbados
- Died: 12 July 2019 (aged 95); Auckland, New Zealand
- Batting: Right-handed

Domestic team information
- Years: Team
- 1948-49 to 1954-55: Barbados

Career statistics
Competition	FC
Matches	6
Runs scored	268
Batting average	26.80
100s/50s	0/2
Top score	84
Catches/stumpings	2/–
- Source: Cricinfo, 10 September 2017

Nigel Gordon Proverbs (22 May 1924 – 12 July 2019) was a cricketer who played first-class cricket for Barbados from 1949 to 1955.

A middle-order batsman, his highest score was 84 in 1951-52, when he added 198 for the fourth wicket with Wilfred Farmer in a Barbados total of 753 against Jamaica. He later moved to New Zealand where he played for many years for the Athletic College Old Boys Cricket Club in Nelson.
