= Stephen Farmer =

Barbadian cricketer

Personal information
- Full name: Stephen Wilfred Farmer
- Born: 23 May 1950 (age 76); Garrison, St Michael, Barbados
- Batting: Right-handed
- Bowling: Right-arm medium-pace
- Relatives: Wilfred Farmer (father)

Domestic team information
- Years: Team
- 1969-70 to 1976-77: Barbados

Career statistics
| Competition | FC | List A |
|---|---|---|
| Matches | 17 | 8 |
| Runs scored | 551 | 104 |
| Batting average | 23.95 | 20.80 |
| 100s/50s | 0/2 | 0/1 |
| Top score | 58 | 63 |
| Balls bowled | 1,890 | 396 |
| Wickets | 16 | 10 |
| Bowling average | 48.06 | 28.40 |
| 5 wickets in innings | 0 | 0 |
| 10 wickets in match | 0 | – |
| Best bowling | 4/55 | 3/30 |
| Catches/stumpings | 10/– | 2/– |
- Source: Cricinfo, 1 December 2018

Stephen Wilfred Farmer SC (born 23 May 1950) is a former Barbadian cricketer, and now a Senior Counsel in Barbados. His father Wilfred played for Barbados in the 1950s.

An all-rounder, Farmer played first-class and List A cricket for Barbados from 1970 to 1977. He won the man of the match award when Barbados defeated Trinidad and Tobago in the final of the Gillette Cup in 1975-76; he scored 68, the highest score of the match, and took 2 for 38.

Farmer was educated at The Lodge School in Barbados and the College of Law in Guildford, England. He is one of the founding partners of the Barbados law firm Clarke Gittens Farmer, and was appointed a Queen's Counsel in 2013.
