= Nitin Goel =

Indian cricketer (born 1969)

Personal information
- Born: 6 April 1969 (age 57); Delhi, India
- Relatives: Rajinder Goel (father)
- Source: ESPNcricinfo, 16 April 2021

Nitin Goel (born 6 April 1969) is an Indian cricketer. He played in 68 first-class matches for Haryana from 1986/87 to 1998/99. His father was Rajinder Goel, who also played first-class cricket for Haryana.
