= Earl Fraites =

Saint Lucian cricketer (born 1953)

Personal information
- Born: 6 September 1953 (age 73); Saint Lucia
- Batting: Left-handed
- Bowling: Right-arm off-spin

Domestic team information
- Years: Team
- 1973–1977: Windward Islands
- Source: CricketArchive, 8 March 2016

Earl Fraites (born 6 September 1953) is a former Saint Lucian cricketer who represented the Windward Islands in West Indian domestic cricket. He played as a right-handed middle-order batsman and right-arm off-spin bowler.

Fraites made his first-class debut for the Windward Islands in April 1973, playing against the touring Australians. On debut, he failed to take a wicket, but batting eighth in his team's second innings scored 38 runs, putting on 113 runs for the seventh wicket with Norbert Phillip. Fraites made irregular appearances for the Windwards over the following seasons, and was promoted up the batting order, batting as high as fourth. Against the Leeward Islands in January 1977, in what turned out to be his final first-class appearance, he took career-best bowling figures, 4/84 from 27.5 overs. Fraites was only 23 at the time of his last appearance for the Windwards, and continued to play for Saint Lucia in regional competitions for several more years.
