= Partab Ramchand =

Indian sports journalist

Partab Ramchand is a veteran Indian sports journalist with wide experience in all modes of the profession – print, electronic (both TV and radio), and digital journalism.

Ramchand started his career in June 1968 with The Indian Express (Madras) and resigned in 1982 as senior sub-editor. From 1982 to 1994 he was the Madras correspondent for the now-defunct weekly magazine Sportsworld and also wrote extensively for The Telegraph, Kolkata. In 1994 he rejoined The Indian Express as Deputy News Editor (Sports) and headed the department till he resigned in March 1999. He was senior editor at Cricinfo from 1999 to 2001.

He has been a contributor to the cricket sections of Sify and Yahoo! Cricket. He was also a film critic for the Indian Express for about 25 years.

Ramchand's books include Great Indian Cricketers (1979), Great Feats of Indian Cricket (1984) and India's Captains: From Nayudu to Ganguly (2004).
