= Imtiaz Ali (cricketer) =

Trinidadian cricketer (born 1954)

Imtiaz Ali Sr.
Personal information
- Born: 28 July 1954 (age 72); Maraval, Trinidad and Tobago
- Batting: Right-handed
- Bowling: Legbreak googly

International information
- National side: West Indies
- Only Test (cap 154): 7 April 1976 v India

Domestic team information
- Years: Team
- 1972–1979: East Trinidad
- 1973–1980: Trinidad and Tobago

Career statistics
| Competition | Tests | FC | LA |
|---|---|---|---|
| Matches | 1 | 46 | 1 |
| Runs scored | 1 | 558 | 2 |
| Batting average | - | 11.16 | 2.00 |
| 100s/50s | 0/0 | 0/0 | 0/0 |
| Top score | 1* | 48* | 2 |
| Balls bowled | 204 | 9,084 | 60 |
| Wickets | 2 | 157 | 1 |
| Bowling average | 44.50 | 26.29 | 28.00 |
| 5 wickets in innings | 0 | 9 | 0 |
| 10 wickets in match | 0 | 2 | 0 |
| Best bowling | 2/37 | 8/38 | 1/28 |
| Catches/stumpings | 0/- | 22/- | 0/- |
- Source: Cricinfo

Imtiaz Ali (born 28 July 1954) is a former Trinidadian cricketer who played in one Test for West Indies against India in 1976.
