= Proverbial name (Africa) =

A proverbial name is a type of given name formation in some cultures of Africa. A proverbial name is a name which is condensed from a proverb, proverbial phrase, or a philosophical statement. An example from the Urhobo culture: Okeremute ("there is time for everything")

== Relevant literature ==
- Abiodun, Michael A., Oluwatoyin M. Olaiya, and Kehinde O. Oladeji. 2022. “A Sociolinguistic Analysis of Yoruba Names Derived from Proverbs.” SKASE Journal of Literary and Cultural Studies, 4, no. 3, 48-60.
- Akinnaso, F. Niyi. "Names and naming principles in cross-cultural perspective." Names 29, no. 1 (1981): 37-63.
- Amali, Halima, Zainab Ciroma, and Amina Bashir. 2019. "Idoma Proverbial Names as a Vehicle of Expression: A Sociolinguistic View." Proverbium: Yearbook of International Proverb Scholarship 36.1, 57-74
- Fasiku, Gbenga. "Yoruba Proverbs, Names and Consciousness." Journal of Pan African Studies 1, no.4 (2006).
- John, Ngbede, Uchegbu-Ekweme Chinyere, and Dansabo Nyitzo Friday.2024. "Pragmatic analysis of Àgàtú proverbial names." Ife Psychologia 32.2, 30-39.
- Ladzekpo, Etse Kobla Makafui. 2024. African Personal Names: An Introduction to Their Historical and Cultural Significance. AuthorHouse. [Chapter 6, proverbial names]
- Musere, Jonathan. "Proverbial Names of the Baganda." Names 46, no. 1 (1998): 73-79.
- Nindow, Mohammed Osman. "Morphology and syntax of Dagbani proverbial names." Ghana Journal of Linguistics 12, no. 2 (2023).
- Nsimbi, N.B., 1950: Baganda Traditional Personal Names. Uganda Journal, Vol. 14, 204–214.
- Ojoade, J. Olowo. “African proverbial names: 101 Ilaje Examples.” Names 28, no. 3 (1980): 195-214.
- Ramaeba, Goabilwe Nnanishie. "Preserving the Setswana Culture through Personal Names." Journal of Asian and African Studies (2026): 1-15.
- Simelane-Kalumba, Phumzile Innocentia. The use of proverbial names among the Xhosa society: Socio-cultural approach. PhD diss., University of Western Cape, 2014.
