= Indian spin quartet =

Group of four Indian cricket bowlers of the 1960s and 1970s

The Indian spin quartet is the collective name given to the Indian cricket spin bowlers of the 1960s and 1970s: Erapalli Prasanna and Srinivas Venkataraghavan (both off spinners), Bhagwat Chandrasekhar (a leg spinner), and Bishan Singh Bedi (a left-arm spinner). Among them, they played 231 Test matches, taking 853 wickets. They were one of the most deadly combinations in world cricket, especially on the dusty subcontinental pitches.

The spin quartet was instrumental in producing many Indian Test victories. There was only one match in which all four of them were in the XI: usually one of the off spinners, Prasanna or Venkataraghavan, was left out. However, these four men made important contributions to some of India's greatest triumphs, including Test series victories in the West Indies and England, as well as Test victories in Australia and New Zealand.

In 2004, the Board of Control for Cricket in India conferred on them the CK Nayudu award, named after India's first Test captain.

== Beginnings ==
By the 1966–67 season, the interest in cricket in India had risen to unprecedented levels. Despite being beaten by the West Indies at home, the Indian team's spirits were not dampened. The captain, Mansoor Ali Khan, the Nawab of Pataudi, thought that it would be a good idea to introduce more quality spinners into the team in order to compensate for the absence of good new-ball bowlers in the country. Leg-spinner Bhagwat Chandrasekhar had already established his place in the team with solid performances against Australia and the West Indies. Erapalli Prasanna was making his comeback having been out of the team for five years, while both Venkatarghavan and Bedi played in the series against West Indies. All four of them played their first (and only) game together against England at Birmingham in the summer of 1967. Prasanna and Chandrasekhar impressed in that game, claiming 7 and 6 wickets respectively, and all four bowlers bowled a tight line. Even though these four bowlers continued to play for 11 more years, this remained the only Test where all of them featured in the Indian test XI.

== Successes ==
Over the years, the spin quartet played vital roles in several memorable victories for the Indian team, starting with an overseas series win against New Zealand in 1967–68. Below are some major Test successes the quartet were a part of:

- Away series victory against New Zealand, 1967–68
- Away series victory against West Indies, 1970–71
- Away series victory against England, 1971
- Home series victory against England, 1972–73
- Home series victory against New Zealand, 1976–77
- Home series victory against West Indies, 1978–79

Out of the four, only Venkataraghavan and Bedi played regular one-day cricket for India. Prasanna never played ODIs, and Chandrasekhar played just one game, against New Zealand in 1976. Bedi and Venkatarghavan played in 10 ODIs together, which included the World Cups of 1975 and 1979.

== Statistics ==
The spin quartet played a combined 231 Tests for India from 1962 to 1983, and grabbed 853 wickets, with 43 five-wicket inning hauls. Much of this success can be attributed to the different bowling styles these bowlers possessed. Bedi was an orthodox left arm-spinner, while Chandrasekhar an attacking leg-break bowler whereas Prasanna and Venkataraghavan were both off-spinners. This way, they could target all kinds of batsmen in the opposition and give their captains plenty of options. It was Chandrasekhar and Bedi who were the leaders of the attack. The two played 42 Tests alongside each other and had almost similar figures, of 184 wickets each. Bedi averaged 27.22, while Chandra averaged 28.70 in these games.
