= Srinivasaraghavan Venkataraghavan =

Indian cricketer

Personal information
- Born: 21 April 1945 (age 81); Madras, Madras Province, British India (now Chennai, Tamil Nadu, India)
- Nickname: Venkat
- Batting: Right-handed
- Bowling: Right-arm off break
- Role: Bowler

International information
- National side: India (1965-1983)
- Test debut (cap 110): 27 February 1965 v New Zealand
- Last Test: 24 September 1983 v Pakistan
- ODI debut (cap 9): 13 July 1974 v England
- Last ODI: 7 April 1983 v West Indies
- ODI shirt no.: 79

Domestic team information
- Years: Team
- 1963–1970: Madras
- 1970–1985: Tamil Nadu
- 1973–1975: Derbyshire

Umpiring information
- Tests umpired: 73 (1993–2004)
- ODIs umpired: 52 (1993–2003)
- FC umpired: 79 (1990–2004)
- LA umpired: 56 (1990–2003)

Career statistics
Competition	Test	ODI	FC	LA
Matches	57	15	341	71
Runs scored	748	54	6,617	346
Batting average	11.68	10.80	17.73	11.16
100s/50s	0/2	0/0	1/24	0/0
Top score	64	26*	137	26*
Balls bowled	14,877	868	83,548	3,985
Wickets	156	5	1390	64
Bowling average	36.11	108.40	24.14	35.34
5 wickets in innings	3	0	85	0
10 wickets in match	1	0	21	0
Best bowling	8/72	2/34	9/93	4/31
Catches/stumpings	44/–	4/–	316/–	29/–
- Source: Cricinfo, 1 November 2023

Srinivasaraghavan Venkataraghavan (born 21 April 1945), also known as Venkat, is an Indian former international cricketer and umpire. He was a right arm off break bowler and a lower order batter. He captained the Indian cricket team in test cricket and also at the first two ICC Cricket World Cups in 1975 and 1979. He represented Tamil Nadu and South zone in domestic cricket while also playing for Derbyshire in English county cricket from 1973 to 1975.

His international career spanned more than 18 years, the third longest for any Indian cricketer. Post his playing career, he later became an umpire on the International Cricket Council elite panel and match referee, standing in more than 150 international matches. He was also a selector, manager, sports commentator and a cricket columnist.

Venkataraghavan holds many records in test and first class cricket. He was the second bowler since Jim Laker to take the wickets of all ten opposition batsman in a single test match when he did so against New Zealand in March 1965 while becoming the youngest player to take a ten wicket haul in a match during the time. He is also the second highest wicket taker in first class cricket for India with 1390 wickets in 341 matches.

Venkataraghavan was awarded the Arjuna award in 1971 and the fourth highest civilian honor, Padma Shri in 2003 by Government of India. He received the C. K. Nayudu Lifetime Achievement Award in 2004, the highest award bestowed by BCCI on a former player.

== Early life and family ==
Venkataraghavan was born 21 April 1945 in Madras, Madras Presidency, British India (now Chennai, Tamil Nadu, India) in a Tamil Iyengar family. He studied at P.S. High School Mylapore. He did his bachelor's degree in engineering from College of Engineering, Guindy in Chennai. He married Ranjani and they have two sons together, Vikram and Vinay.

== International career ==
=== 1965-68: Test debut and early years ===
Venkataraghavan made his debut for the Indian team against the touring New Zealand team at his home ground in Chennai in February 1965 at the age of 20. He took 21 wickets in four matches including 12 wickets in the fourth test at Delhi to lead India to victory. He dismissed all New Zealand batters at least once in the match, becoming the second bowler ever to achieve the feat after Jim Laker in 1956. He also became the youngest cricketer to take ten wickets in a test match at the age of 19 years and 332 days which has since been broken by six cricketers including two Indians. Venkataraghavan played only three test matches in the next three years, two against West Indies at home in 1966 and one against England in Birmingham in 1967.

=== 1969-73: Middle years ===
Venkataraghavan made a comeback to the Indian side in the home series against New Zealand and Australia in October–November 1969 taking 23 wickets in seven matches. Post the home season, he did not play any test matches for almost 15 months before he made a return during Indian tour of West Indies in February 1971. Venkataraghavan was the top wicket taker in the series victory with 22 wickets in five matches. He was part of the Indian tour of England that followed and was again the leading wicket taker with 13 wickets in three matches leading India to a series win.

=== 1974-78: ODI debut and World Cups ===
Venkataraghavan captained the Indian test side in the second test against West Indies in December 1974. He made his ODI debut in the first match of the Indian tour of England in July 1974 at Leeds. Venkataraghavan was the captain of the Indian team that appeared in the first Cricket World Cup in 1975 in England. India lost two matches with Venkataraghavan himself taking no wickets, and did not qualify for semi-finals. Post the World Cup, Venkataraghavan played in the away series against West Indies in March–April 1976 taking seven wickets in three tests. He subsequently played in the home series against New Zealand in November–December 1976 taking 11 wickets in three matches. He played a lone test match in 1977 in away series against Australia. Venkataraghavan was again the captain of the Indian side for the second consecutive World Cup in 1979. India again lost all three matches with Venkataraghavan himself taking no wickets.

=== 1979-83: Captaincy and later years ===
Venkataraghavan played all six matches in the home series against West Indies which started in December 1979. He was the third highest wicket taker with 20 wickets in the Indian series victory. He was captain of the Indian team that toured England in July 1979. India lost the series 1–0 with Venkataraghavan himself having a low return of seven wickets in four matches. He played three matches in the home series against Australia in September–November 1979 taking six wickets in three matches in the 2–0 series victory for India. Venkataraghavan sparsely played international matches in the next four years before the Indian tour of West Indies in April 1983 in which he played his last ODI. He finished his ODI career with five wickets in 15 matches. He took ten wickets in the five test matches in the series. Venkataraghavan played his last test match against Pakistan at Jalandhar during the Pakistan tour of India in September 1983. He finished with 156 wickets in 57 test matches in a career spanning more than 18 years, the third longest for any Indian player behind Sachin Tendulkar and Lala Amarnath.

== Domestic career ==
In domestic cricket, Venkataraghavan made his debut for Tamil Nadu in 1963–64 season and went on to represent the team for more than twenty years till 1984–85. He also played for and captained South Zone. Venkat retired from first-class cricket in 1985. Venkataraghavan took 1390 wickets in 341 matches and was the second highest wicket taker in first class cricket for India. He also played for Derbyshire in English county cricket from 1973 to 1975.

== Post-retirement ==
Venkataraghavan made his international umpiring debut in the One Day International between India and England at Jaipur on 18 January 1993. He made his test umpiring debut in the same month, with the match between India and England at Kolkata. He was part of the inaugural panel of International umpires established by International Cricket Council in 1994 and was part of the Elite Panel of top umpires created in 2004. He was an umpire in six Ashes tests and three World Cups in 1996, 1999 and 2003. He was appointed to stand in a semi-final in each of the 1996 and 1999 World Cups and was the third umpire of the 1999 Cricket World Cup final between Australia and Pakistan at Lord's. He also served as a match referee in five tests and eight ODIs, along with serving as a selector, manager, sports commentator and a cricket columnist.

== Playing style ==
Venkataraghavan was an off spin bowler with a highly accurate bowling. He was one of the famed Indian quartet of spin bowlers in the 1970s along with Bhagwat Chandrasekhar, Bishan Singh Bedi and Erapalli Prasanna. All four spinners played together in a lone match forced by injury meaning that the competition was high for one or two spots on the Indian team and hence longer breaks when a particular bowler was not favored. He was also a useful tail-end batsman and strong fielder.

== Career statistics ==
=== Wickets ===
Venkataraghavan took 156 wickets in 57 test matches to go with 1390 wickets in 341 first class wickets.

Venkataraghavan's Test cricket record
	Mat	Wickets	Bowl Avg.	Best	5WI	10WM
Home	32	94	30.64	8/72	2	1
Away	25	62	44.40	5/95	1	0
Total	57	156	36.11	8/72	3	1

=== Captaincy ===
Venkataraghavan captained the Indian test side in a single test against West Indies in December 1974 before being appointed as a test captain for the four test series against England in 1979. He captained Indian in seven ODIs including the first two cricket world cups in 1975 and 1979.

Venkataraghavan captaincy record
Type	Matches	Won	Lost	Drawn	Tied	No result
Test	5	0	2	3	0	0
ODI	7	1	6	0	0	1
Total	12	1	8	3	0	0

=== Umpire ===
Venkataraghavan was an umpire as a part of the elite panel of ICC umpires and a match referee. He took part in 78 ODIs and 79 test matches as an official.

Venkataraghavan umpiring record
Type	Umpire	TV Umpire	Referee	Total
ODI	52	18	8	78
Test	73	1	5	79
Total	125	19	13	157

== Honors ==
- Arjuna award (1971), Government of India
- Padma Shri (2003), Government of India
- C. K. Nayudu Lifetime Achievement Award (2004), BCCI

== See also ==
- List of Test cricket umpires
- List of One Day International cricket umpires

Preceded by Nawab of Pataudi Jr	Indian National Test Cricket Captain; 1974/75	Succeeded by Nawab of Pataudi Jr
Preceded by Sunil Gavaskar	Indian National Test Cricket Captain; 1979	Succeeded by Sunil Gavaskar
