= E. A. S. Prasanna =

Indian Cricketer

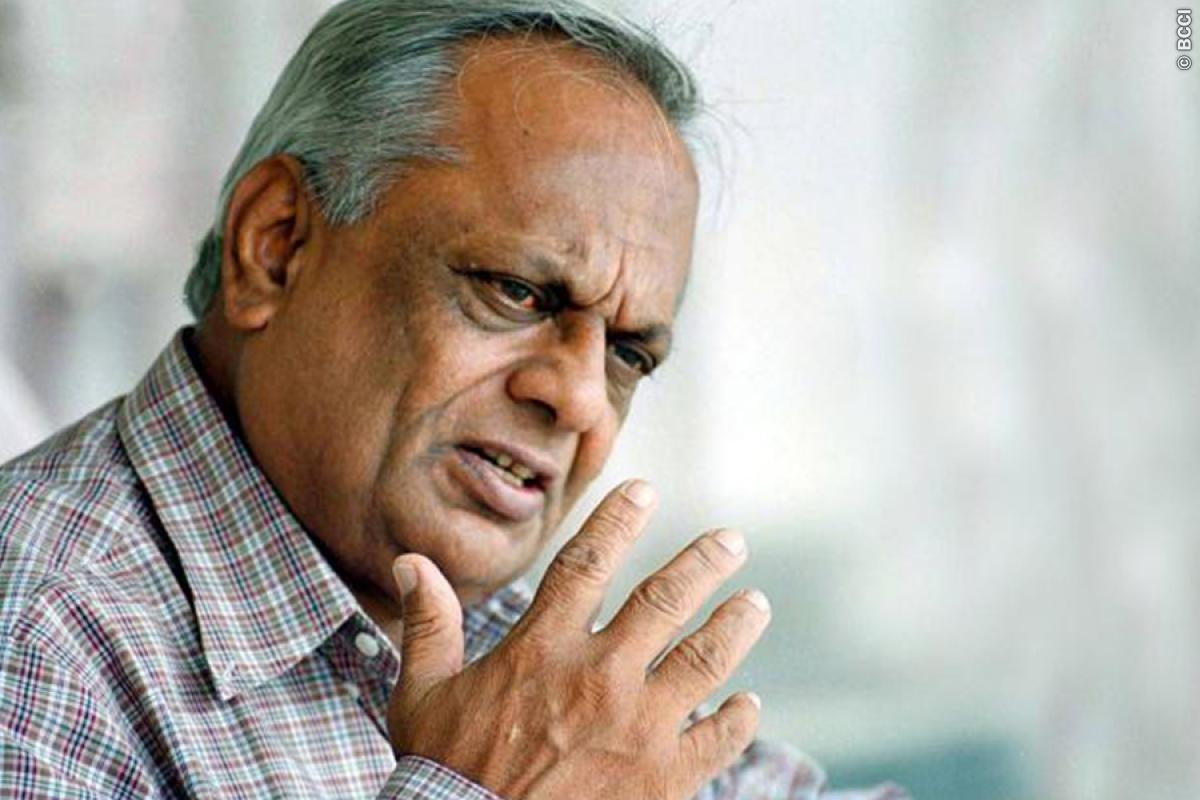
- Erapalli Anantharao Srinivas Prasanna

Personal information
- Full name: Erapalli Anantharao Srinivas Prasanna
- Born: 22 May 1940 (age 86); Bangalore, Kingdom of Mysore, British India
- Height: 161 cm (5 ft 3 in)
- Batting: Right-handed
- Bowling: Right-arm off-break
- Role: Bowler

International information
- National side: India
- Test debut (cap 105): 10 January 1962 v England
- Last Test: 27 October 1978 v Pakistan

Career statistics
Competition	Test	FC	LA
Matches	49	235	9
Runs scored	735	2,476	33
Batting average	11.48	11.90	16.5
100s/50s	0/0	0/2	0/0
Top score	37	81	22
Balls bowled	14,353	54,823	586
Wickets	189	957	17
Bowling average	30.38	23.45	18.7
5 wickets in innings	10	56	0
10 wickets in match	2	9	0
Best bowling	8/76	8/50	3/29
Catches/stumpings	18/–	127/–	3/–
- Source: ESPNcricinfo, 9 November 2014

Erapalli Anantharao Srinivas Prasanna (born 22 May 1940) is a former Indian cricket player. He was a spin bowler, specialising in off spin and a member of the Indian spin quartet. He is an alumnus of the National Institute of Engineering, Mysore. He received the C. K. Nayudu Lifetime Achievement Award in 2004, the highest honour bestowed by BCCI on a former player.

== Career ==
Prasanna played his debut Test cricket match at Madras against England in 1961. His first overseas tour to the West Indies was a tough one and he did not play another Test for five years. He left the sport for a period to finish his engineering degree, returning in 1967. He gained a regular place in the side following his excellent performances in England in 1967.

He retired in 1978, after a tour of Pakistan which also signaled the decline of Bishen Singh Bedi and Bhagwat Chandrasekhar. He twice led Karnataka to the Ranji Trophy, the first time ending Bombay's 15-year reign. Prasanna was highly successful not only on Indian turning wickets, but on foreign pitches too. He achieved the record of fastest 100 wickets in Tests for an Indian Bowler (in 20 Tests) at his time. His record was broken by Ravichandran Ashwin .

Widely respected and feared in domestic cricket as well, he enjoyed bowling to batsmen that were willing to try to hit him. He had a neat, brisk, high action and control of line, length, and flight. He spun the ball in a classic high loop towards the batsman, increasing his chances of beating his adversary in the air. As a result, he made the ball bounce higher than expected. A bowler with an attacking mindset, he was also patient, and would bait a batsman for over after over, attempting to induce a mistake.

He has written an autobiography, One More Over.

== Awards and achievements ==
- 1970 – Padma Shri Award
- 2004 – C. K. Nayudu Lifetime Achievement Award
- 2006 – Castrol Lifetime Achievement award.
- 2012 – Award from Board of Control for Cricket in India for playing more than 50 Test matches.
- 3rd Cross Road in Dommaluru, Bengaluru has been respectfully named as EAS Prasanna Road
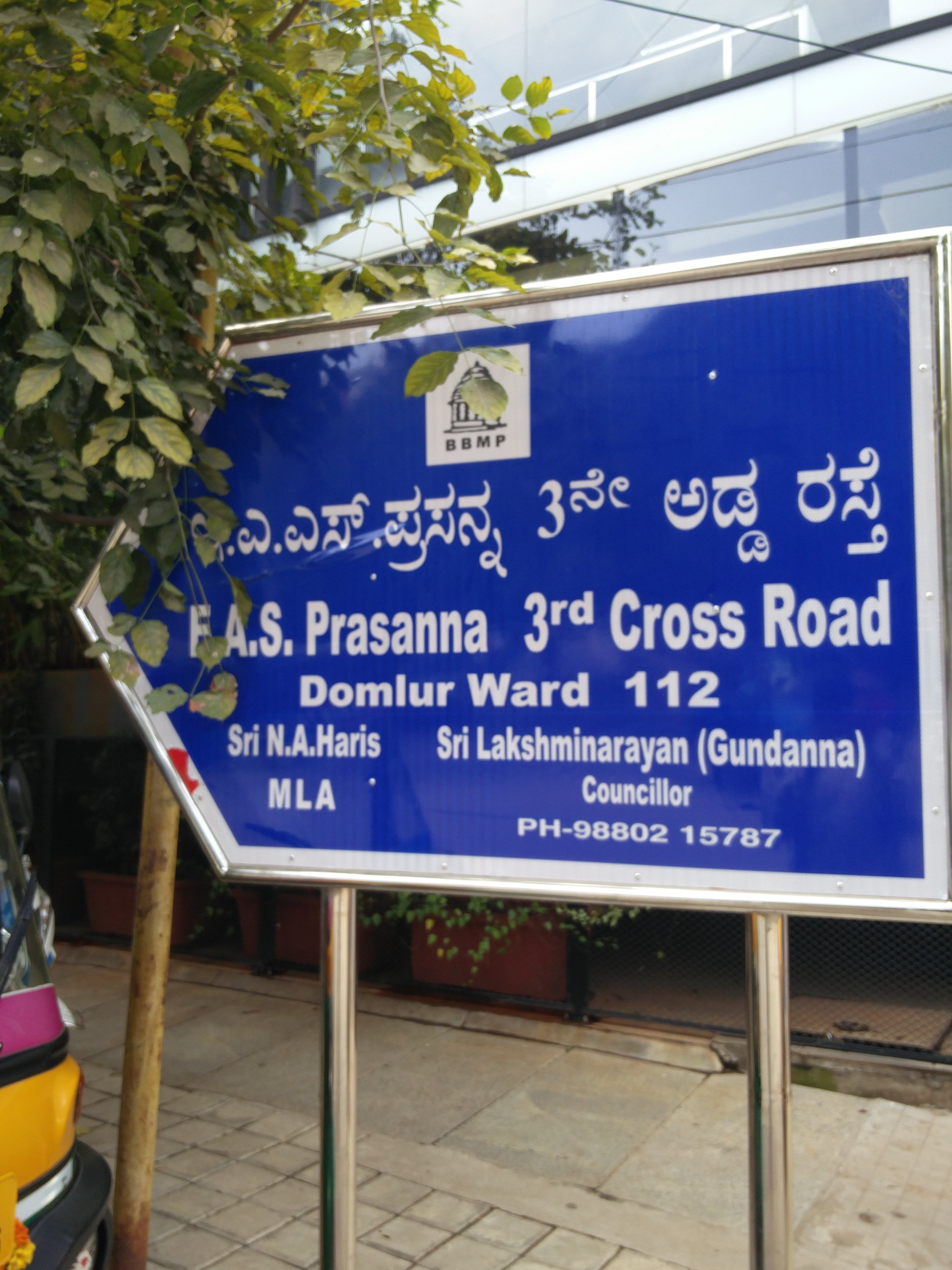
  EAS Prasanna Cross, ESI Hospital Road, Dommaluru Ward, Bengaluru
