= Bishan Singh Bedi =

Indian cricketer (1946–2023)

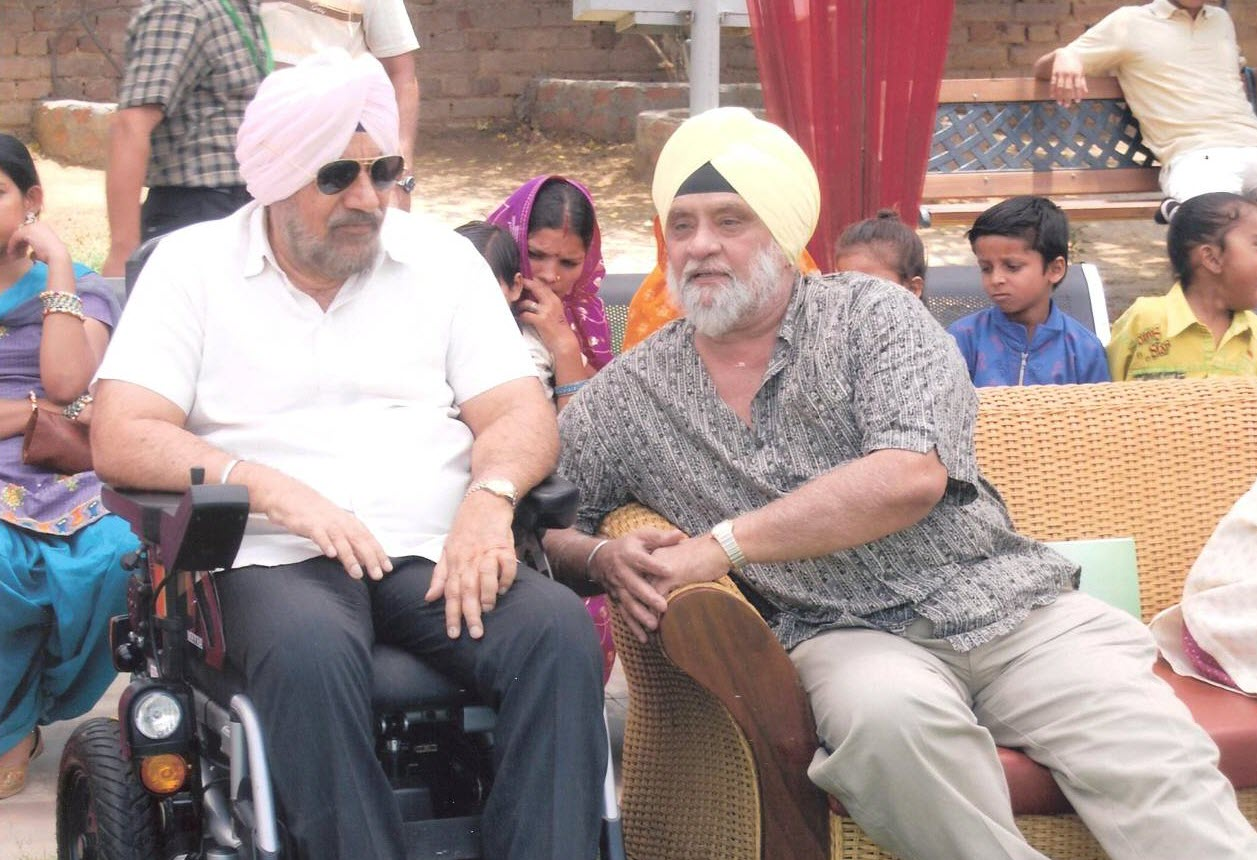

Personal information
- Born: 25 September 1946; Amritsar, Punjab Province, British India
- Died: 23 October 2023 (aged 77); New Delhi, NCT of Delhi, India
- Nickname: Bishu
- Batting: Right-handed
- Bowling: Slow left-arm orthodox
- Role: Bowler
- Relatives: Angad Bedi (son); Neha Dhupia (daughter-in-law)

International information
- National side: India (1966–1979)
- Test debut (cap 113): 31 December 1966 v West Indies
- Last Test: 30 August 1979 v England
- ODI debut (cap 2): 13 July 1974 v England
- Last ODI: 16 June 1979 v Sri Lanka

Domestic team information
- Years: Team
- 1961–1967: Northern Punjab
- 1968–1981: Delhi
- 1972–1977: Northamptonshire

Career statistics
| Competition | Test | ODI | FC | LA |
|---|---|---|---|---|
| Matches | 67 | 10 | 370 | 72 |
| Runs scored | 656 | 31 | 3,584 | 218 |
| Batting average | 8.98 | 6.20 | 11.37 | 6.81 |
| 100s/50s | 0/1 | 0/0 | 0/7 | 0/0 |
| Top score | 50* | 13 | 61 | 24* |
| Balls bowled | 21,364 | 590 | 90,315 | 3,686 |
| Wickets | 266 | 7 | 1,560 | 71 |
| Bowling average | 28.71 | 48.57 | 21.69 | 29.39 |
| 5 wickets in innings | 14 | 0 | 106 | 1 |
| 10 wickets in match | 1 | 0 | 20 | 0 |
| Best bowling | 7/98 | 2/44 | 7/5 | 5/30 |
| Catches/stumpings | 26/– | 4/– | 172/– | 21/– |
- Source: ESPNcricinfo, 9 November 2014

Bishan Singh Bedi (25 September 1946 – 23 October 2023) was an Indian cricketer who was primarily a slow left-arm orthodox bowler. He played Test cricket for India from 1966 to 1979 and formed part of the famous Indian spin quartet. He played a total of 67 Tests and took 266 wickets. He also captained the national side in 22 Test matches. Bedi wore a colourful patka and was always known for his outspoken and forthright views on cricketing matters. He was awarded the Padma Shri award in 1970 and the C. K. Nayudu Lifetime Achievement Award in 2004.

== Playing career ==
In Indian domestic cricket, Bedi first played for Northern Punjab when only fifteen, having taken up cricket only two years previously, a particularly late age for this sport. He moved to Delhi in 1968–69 and in the 1974–75 season of the Ranji Trophy, he took a record 64 wickets. Bedi also represented Northamptonshire in English county cricket for many years. He finished his career with 1560 wickets in first-class cricket — more than any other Indian cricketer.

His bowling has been described as graceful, even beautiful, and full of guile and artistry. He was an expert in flighting the ball, and was capable of making it hold back or hurry forward and added subtle variations of spin. His action was so relaxed and coordinated that he was able to bowl all day with rhythm and control, a great asset to any captain. He had several very successful Test series:

- India vs Australia 1969–70: 21 wickets at the average of 20.57
- India vs England 1972–73: 25 wickets at the average of 25.28
- India in the West Indies 1975–1976 : 18 wickets at the average of 25.33
- India vs New Zealand 1976–77: 22 wickets at the average of 13.18
- India vs England 1976–77: 25 wickets at the average of 22.96
- India in Australia 1977–78: 31 wickets at the average of 23.87

His best Test bowling was 7/98 against Australia at Calcutta in 1969–70, and his best match figures 10/194 at Perth in 1977–78, also against Australia. His best first class bowling was 7/5 for Delhi vs Jammu and Kashmir at New Delhi 1974–75. Although his batting was poor he hit a boundary off the second last ball in the Gillette Cup Semi Final for Northamptonshire vs Hampshire, winning the match by two wickets. His highest score of 50 not out, his only half century at Test level, was scored against New Zealand in Kanpur in 1976.

Bedi was appointed captain of India in 1976, succeeding Mansoor Ali Khan Pataudi. His first Test victory as captain was against the West Indies at Port-of-Spain in the 3rd Test of the 1976 series in which India scored a then-record 406 in the fourth innings. This was followed up by a 2–0 series victory over New Zealand at home. However, after successive Test series losses to England (3–1 at home), Australia (3–2 away) and Pakistan (2–0 away), he was replaced as captain by Sunil Gavaskar in 1979.

Bedi is second to Lance Gibbs in terms of maiden overs per test, 16.35 against 16.62. He bowled 4.2 maiden overs per wicket as against 4.24 by Gibbs.

In 2008, Wisden Cricketers' Almanack named Bedi as one of the five best cricketers to have not been selected as a Wisden Cricketer of the Year.

== Controversies ==
As captain of India, Bedi was involved in some controversies. Following India's record-breaking run-chase in the 3rd Test of the 1976 series against the West Indies, the West Indies opted for an aggressive four-man fast bowler attack for the 4th Test. Bedi objected to their tactics of short-pitched bowling, and declared the Indian first innings closed early after two players were forced to retire hurt. Subsequently, five players were absent hurt in the second innings of the match.

In England's tour of India in 1976–77 he accused John Lever of using Vaseline to illegally polish the ball in the Third Test at Madras. Lever wore Vaseline strips on his forehead to keep the sweat out of his eyes; he was subsequently cleared of any wrongdoing.

In November 1978, he became the first captain to concede an international cricket match. In a One Day International against Pakistan at Sahiwal (Pakistan), India with 8 wickets in hand, required 23 runs from 14 balls. Bedi, however, recalled the batsmen from the crease and conceded the match in protest at the bowling of Sarfraz Nawaz who had bowled 4 bouncers in succession with not one being called wide by the umpires.

=== Coaching ===
In 1990, after he had managed a tour where India had played poorly, he threatened to dump the entire team in the sea on the return journey.

=== Opinions on modern-day cricket ===
Bedi expressed strong opinions on many aspects of modern-day cricket and was described as "being jealous of modern-day great spinners". In particular, he was a vehement critic of the bowling action of Muttiah Muralitharan ("if Murali doesn't chuck, then show me how to bowl") which he bluntly referred to as cheating and likened to a javelin throw and shot putting, saying that Muralitharan would "complete 1000 Test wickets but they would count as mere run-outs in my eyes". He took a very dim view of chucking, which he called "a bigger threat than bribing and betting" and claimed in 2004 that many bowlers on the subcontinent chuck, calling Muralitharan a "Sri Lankan bandit closing in on a dream artist called Shane Warne". He had stated, though, that he has nothing personal against Muralitharan, although Muralitharan had threatened to sue him. He levelled the same criticisms against his countryman Harbhajan Singh. Regarding suspect actions in cricket, he said "When a bowler is chucking, he's referred to panels and the home cricket board. Why not do the same for a wide or no-ball, then?". He had accused one-day cricket, modern cricket bats and small grounds of causing a decline in classical spin bowling in India.

Bedi also attacked Sunil Gavaskar, calling him "a destructive influence". He said to Australian coach John Buchanan "Tell us, John, have you made this Australian team great, or have they made you?"

== Personal life and death ==
Bedi was born on 25 September 1946, in Amritsar in then British India.

His son Angad Bedi (born 1983) is an Indian actor and former model, and his daughter-in-law Neha Dhupia is a well known Bollywood actress.

He said that he had always washed his own clothes, calling it "the best exercise for your shoulders and fingers", when pointing out that spin bowling requires suppleness of limbs.

Bedi died in New Delhi on 23 October 2023, at the age of 77.

== Records ==
Bedi held the world record for the most economical bowling figures in a 60-over ODI match amongst the bowlers who had completed their quota of overs (12 overs). In the 1975 World Cup, when the bowlers were allowed to deliver 12 overs, Bedi finished with 12–8–6–1 (overs-maidens-runs-wickets) against East Africa at Headingley.

== Accolades ==
Bedi was awarded the Padma Shri in 1970.

In 2004, Bedi, along with Bhagwat Chandrasekhar, Srinivas Venkatraghavan and Erapalli Prasanna, collectively known as the Indian spin quartet, were named as winners of the C. K. Nayudu Lifetime Achievement Award by the Board of Control for Cricket in India.

== Sources ==
- Robinson, R. (1979). The Wildest Tests. Stanmore, NSW: Cassell Australia. ISBN 0-7269-7375-0.

| Preceded by Sunil Gavaskar | Indian National Test Cricket Captain; 1975–76, 1978–79 | Succeeded by Sunil Gavaskar |
| Preceded by — | Indian National Cricket Manager; July 1990 – September 1991 | Succeeded by Abbas Ali Baig |
