= Raphick Jumadeen =

Trinidadian cricketer (1948–2023)

Personal information
- Full name: Raphick Rasif Jumadeen
- Born: 12 April 1948; Harmony Hall, Gasparillo, Trinidad and Tobago
- Died: 25 July 2023 (aged 75); Port of Spain, Trinidad and Tobago
- Batting: Right-handed
- Bowling: Slow left-arm orthodox

International information
- National side: West Indies
- Test debut (cap 145): 20 April 1972 v New Zealand
- Last Test: 2 February 1979 v India

Career statistics
Competition	Test	First-class
Matches	12	99
Runs scored	84	604
Batting average	21.00	8.50
100s/50s	0/1	0/2
Top score	56	56
Balls bowled	3,140	24,724
Wickets	29	347
Bowling average	39.34	27.91
5 wickets in innings	0	16
10 wickets in match	0	3
Best bowling	4/72	6/30
Catches/stumpings	4/–	45/–
- Source: Cricinfo, 31 October 2022

Raphick Rasif Jumadeen (12 April 1948 – 25 July 2023) was a Trinidadian cricketer who played in twelve Test matches from 1972 to 1979 for West Indies. He scored a total of 84 runs in his Test career, including 56 in one innings.

Raphick Jumadeen died on 25 July 2023, at the age of 75.
