= David Holford =

West Indian cricketer (1940–2022)

Personal information
- Full name: David Anthony Jerome Holford
- Born: 16 April 1940; Upper Collymore Rock, Saint Michael, Barbados
- Died: 30 May 2022 (aged 82); Barbados
- Batting: Right-handed
- Bowling: Right-arm legbreak
- Relatives: Garfield Sobers (cousin)

International information
- National side: West Indies
- Test debut (cap 124): 2 June 1966 v England
- Last Test: 15 April 1977 v Pakistan

Career statistics
Competition	Test	FC	LA
Matches	24	99	12
Runs scored	768	3,821	135
Batting average	22.58	31.31	19.28
100s/50s	1/3	3/20	0/0
Top score	105*	111	46
Balls bowled	4,816	17,430	330
Wickets	51	253	8
Bowling average	39.39	31.99	31.25
5 wickets in innings	1	8	0
10 wickets in match	0	2	0
Best bowling	5/23	8/52	3/29
Catches/stumpings	18/–	83/–	4/–
- Source: CricInfo, 30 April 2022

David Anthony Jerome Holford (16 April 1940 – 30 May 2022) was a West Indian cricketer who played in 24 Test matches between 1966 and 1977.

== Career ==
Holford was born on 16 April 1940 at Upper Collymore Rock, Saint Michael, Barbados, and was a middle-order batsman and leg-spinner. In his second Test, at Lord's in 1966, he and his cousin Garry Sobers put on an unbroken partnership of 274 for the sixth wicket after West Indies had lost five for 95 in their second innings and were leading by only nine runs. Holford scored 105 not out, his only Test century. He took 5 wickets and made 80 in the First Test against India in 1966–67, but then suffered an attack of pleurisy and had to return home. He never had a regular place in the Test team after that. His best Test bowling figures came in 1975–76 when he took 5 for 23 on the first day against India in the First Test at Bridgetown.

Holford played for Barbados from 1960–61 to 1978–79 (apart from a season in Trinidad in 1962–63), captaining the team in most matches from 1969–70 until 1978–79. His highest first-class score was 111 for Barbados against the touring Indians in 1970–71, when he put on 213 with Sobers for the fourth wicket. His best first-class bowling figures were 8 for 52 (12 for 115 in the match) for the West Indian touring team against Cambridge University in 1966. He also took 4 for 89 and 6 for 61 for Barbados against Combined Leeward and Windward Islands in 1969–70. He was the first player in the Shell Shield to score 1000 runs and take 100 wickets.

He later played in Kerry Packer's World Series Cricket. He served on the West Indies selection panel and also served as team manager. During his time as a selector he discovered Shivnarine Chanderpaul, who went on to become West Indies' second highest run scorer of all time.

== Personal life and death ==
Holford had a degree in agriculture and worked as a soil scientist, and another degree in computer studies. After retiring, he became the president of Harrison College in Barbados.

On 30 May 2022, Holford died at the age of 82 in Barbados.

== General and cited sources ==
- Martin-Jenkins, C. (1983), The Complete Who's Who of Test Cricketers, Rigby: Adelaide. ISBN 978-0-7270-1870-0.
