= B. S. Chandrasekhar =

Indian Cricketer

Personal information
- Full name: Bhagwat Subramanya Chandrasekhar
- Born: 17 May 1945 (age 81); Mysore, Kingdom of Mysore, British India
- Nickname: Chandra
- Height: 170 cm (5 ft 7 in)
- Batting: Right-handed
- Bowling: Legbreak
- Role: Bowler

International information
- National side: India
- Test debut (cap 106): 21 January 1964 v England
- Last Test: 12 July 1979 v England
- Only ODI (cap 20): 22 February 1976 v New Zealand

Career statistics
| Competition | Test | ODI | FC | LA |
|---|---|---|---|---|
| Matches | 58 | 1 | 246 | 7 |
| Runs scored | 167 | 11 | 600 | 25 |
| Batting average | 4.07 | – | 4.61 | 25.00 |
| 100s/50s | 0/0 | 0/0 | 0/0 | 0/0 |
| Top score | 22 | 11* | 25 | 14* |
| Balls bowled | 15,963 | 56 | 53,817 | 420 |
| Wickets | 242 | 3 | 1,063 | 8 |
| Bowling average | 29.74 | 12.00 | 24.03 | 38.87 |
| 5 wickets in innings | 16 | 0 | 75 | 0 |
| 10 wickets in match | 2 | 0 | 19 | 0 |
| Best bowling | 8/79 | 3/36 | 9/72 | 4/61 |
| Catches/stumpings | 25/– | 0/– | 107/– | 1/– |
- Source: ESPNcricinfo, 10 November 2014

Bhagwat Subramanya Chandrasekhar (informally Chandra; born 17 May 1945) is an Indian former cricketer who played as a leg spinner. Considered among the top echelon of leg spinners, Chandrasekhar along with E.A.S. Prasanna, Bishen Singh Bedi and Srinivasaraghavan Venkataraghavan constituted the Indian spin quartet that dominated spin bowling during the 1960s and 1970s. At a very young age, polio left his right arm withered. Chandrasekhar played 58 Test matches, capturing 242 wickets at an average of 29.74 in a career that spanned sixteen years. He is one of only two Test cricketers in history with more wickets than total runs scored, the other being Chris Martin.

Chandrasekhar was awarded the Padmashri in 1972. He was named as a Wisden Cricketer of the Year in 1972; in 2002 he won Wisden's award for "Best bowling performance of the century" for India, for his six wickets for 38 runs against England at the Oval in 1971. He received the C. K. Nayudu Lifetime Achievement Award in 2004, the highest honour bestowed by BCCI on a former player.

== Biography ==
Chandrasekhar was born in 1945 in Mysore, where he had his primary education. He developed an early interest in cricket watching the playing styles of Australian leg spinner Richie Benaud. An attack of polio at the age of six left his right arm withered. At the age of 10, his hand had recovered and Chandrasekhar started playing cricket.

By that time his family relocated to Bangalore and he got an opportunity to play for "City Cricketers". In an interview, Chandrasekhar stated that he joined up mainly to get a chance to play with the leather ball. While playing on the streets of Bangalore, he had mainly used a rubber ball. While playing for the club, Chandrasekhar tried different bowling styles that also included fast bowling. It was in 1963 that he decided to play as a leg spin bowler. His idea proved to be right as he was soon selected for the national team.

Making his Test debut for India against England at Bombay in 1964, he collected four wickets in the match. He was named the Indian Cricket Cricketer of the Year the same year. Chandrasekhar was influential in setting up India's first victory in England when he picked up six wickets for 38 runs at The Oval in 1971; the bowling was named the "Indian Bowling performance of the century" by Wisden in 2002. Wisden noted that he was "wonderfully accurate for a bowler of his type, and his extra pace made him a formidable proposition even on the sluggish Oval pitch." His consistent bowling performances in 1971 earned him being named one of the five Wisden Cricketers of the Year in 1972.

In a Test against New Zealand in 1976, Chandrasekhar and Prasanna took 19 wickets and were crucial in setting up India's win. Attributed to him is a famous umpire-directed quote, made during a day of bad decisions in New Zealand after several of his lbw appeals were given not out: "I know he is bowled, but is he out?" Chandrasekhar also played a major role in India's victory in Australia in 1977–78. During that series he became the first bowler to register identical figures in each innings of a test (6 for 52).

Chandrasekhar had minimal batting skills, finishing with a Test average of 4.07. He was given a special Gray-Nicholls bat during the 1977–78 Australian tour with a hole in it to commemorate the four ducks he scored, and he has 23 Test ducks to his credit. He also holds the dubious distinction of scoring fewer runs (167) off his bat than wickets (242) taken in Test cricket; the only other cricketer with this distinction over a significant Test career is New Zealand fast bowler Chris Martin.

== Honours and recognitions ==
- Indian Cricket Cricketer of the Year in 1964
- Wisden Cricketers of the Year in 1972
- Padmashri in 1972
- Arjuna Award in 1972
- C. K. Nayudu Award in 2004

== See also ==
- List of international cricket five-wicket hauls by B. S. Chandrasekhar
