= Indian cricket team in England in 1971 =

International cricket tour

	India	England
- Dates: 23 June – 7 September 1971
Captains	Ajit Wadekar	Ray Illingworth

Test series
- Result: India won the 3-match series 1–0
Most runs	Ajit Wadekar (204)	Brian Luckhurst (244)
Most wickets	S Venkataraghavan (13)	Norman Gifford (8)

The Indian cricket team toured England in the 1971 season and played 19 first-class fixtures, winning 7, losing only one and drawing 11.

India played three Test matches and surprisingly won the series against England 1–0 with two Tests drawn. This was India's first ever series win in England. The First Test at Lord's and the Second Test at Old Trafford were drawn. India pulled off a historic win in the Third Test at The Oval by 4 wickets after being 71 behind on first innings. They bowled England out for only 101 in the second innings with Bhagwat Chandrasekhar claiming 6–38.

The Indian team was captained by Ajit Wadekar. Besides Wadekar and Chandrasekhar, the team included other notable players in Dilip Sardesai, Srinivasaraghavan Venkataraghavan, Gundappa Viswanath, Bishan Singh Bedi and the young Sunil Gavaskar. Farokh Engineer, who had a contract with Lancashire, was made available for the Tests and a few other matches.

== Background ==
With South Africa out of Test cricket, England was competitively on top. Earlier in the summer, they managed to defeat Pakistan 1–0 but coming into the series England had gone 24 Tests without defeat. They were to extend it to a record 26 Test matches before losing the third Test.

India had not won a Test abroad till 1968 and had had no success in their previous six Test tours of England. However, under the new captain Ajit Wadekar, India defeated West Indies in an away series in early 1971. The victory in that series was built around the batting of Sunil Gavaskar and Dilip Sardesai who scored 774 and 642 runs respectively. Chandrasekhar had been a controversial omission from the West Indies series. Chief Selector Vijay Merchant called his inclusion for the tour of England "a calculated gamble".

== Touring party ==
- Ajit Wadekar (captain)
- Srinivas Venkataraghavan (vice-captain)
- Abbas Ali Baig
- Abid Ali
- Bishen Bedi
- Bhagwat Chandrasekhar
- Farokh Engineer
- Sunil Gavaskar
- D. Govindraj
- K. Jayantilal
- Syed Kirmani
- Pochiah Krishnamurthy
- Ashok Mankad
- Erapalli Prasanna
- Dilip Sardesai
- Eknath Solkar
- Gundappa Viswanath
- Hemu Adhikari (manager)

M. L. Jaisimha, Salim Durani and Rusi Jeejeebhoy were excluded from the team that toured West Indies.

== Test series ==
=== First Test ===
22–27 July
Scorecard

England	v	India
304 (139.3 overs); John Snow 73 (132); Bishan Singh Bedi 4/70 (39.3 overs)		313 (165.3 overs); Ajit Wadekar 85 (182); Norman Gifford 4/84 (45.3 overs)
191 (98.5 overs); John Edrich 62 (169); Srinivas Venkataraghavan 4/52 (30.5 overs)		145/8 (50 overs); Sunil Gavaskar 53 (96); Norman Gifford 4/43 (19 overs)

Match drawn
Lord's, London
Umpires: David Constant (Eng) and Charlie Elliott (Eng)

=== Second Test ===
5–10 August
Scorecard

England	v	India
386 (160.4 overs); Ray Illingworth 107 (298); Syed Abid Ali 4/64 (32.4 overs)		212 (93 overs); Sunil Gavaskar 57 (129); Peter Lever 5/70 (26 overs)
245/3d (66 overs); Brian Luckhurst 101 (173); Bishan Singh Bedi 1/21 (5 overs)		65/3 (27 overs); Sunil Gavaskar 24 (42); John Price 2/30 (10 overs)

Match drawn
Old Trafford, Manchester
Umpires: Arthur Fagg (Eng) and Tom Spencer (Eng)

- England won the toss and elected to bat.
- John Jameson (Eng) made his debut in Tests.

=== Third Test ===
19–24 August
Scorecard

England	v	India
355 (108.4 overs); Alan Knott 90 (116); Eknath Solkar 3/28 (15 overs)		284 (117.3 overs); Farokh Engineer 59 (111); Ray Illingworth 5/70 934.3 overs)
101 (45.1 overs); Brian Luckhurst 33 (111); B. S. Chandrasekhar 6/38 (18.1 overs)		174/6 (101 overs); Ajit Wadekar 45 (118); Derek Underwood 3/72 (38 overs)

India won by 4 wickets
Kennington Oval, London
Umpires: Charlie Elliott (Eng) and Dusty Rhodes (Eng)

- India's victory ended an England streak of 26 Tests without loss.

== Other matches ==
=== v Middlesex ===
At Lord's, 23, 24, 25 June. Middlesex (233 and 131) lost to the Indians (168 and 198–8) by two wickets.

Eric Russell and Mike Smith added 89 for the first wicket after Mike Brearley won the toss and batted. Russell, dropped three times, became the third batsman – after John Jameson and Zaheer Abbas – to complete 1,000 runs for the season. He was caught at mid-off for 84 in three and a half hours. Middlesex, 164 for 2 at the time of Russell's dismissal, was all out for 233. John Price took the wickets of Abbas Ali Baig and Ajit Wadekar off successive balls as India ended the first day on 41 for 3. They slid further to 94 for 6 before Viswanath and Abid Ali added 76 runs in an hour. Going in second with a 65-run lead, Middlesex lost five wickets for 20 runs in 40 minutes after tea. Bedi took 6 for 29 and India needed 197 to win. Price took two wickets off consecutive balls for the fourth day in a row, Sunil Gavaskar and Dilip Sardesai being the batsmen this time. This time the first five wickets fell for 79 but Eknath Solkar and Abid Ali added 56 and Bedi finished the match pulling Peter Parfitt for four. On a wearing wicket, Middlesex missed Fred Titmus who had been rested.

=== v Essex ===
At Garrison A Cricket Ground, Colchester, 26, 28, 29 June. Indians (164 and 231) lost to Essex (328–8 decl and 68 for 4) by six wickets.

The match was played in very English conditions – the wicket hardly differed from the outfield, there was a near gale-force wind and it rained. Keith Boyce dismissed Gavaskar with the last ball of the first over. John Lever hit Jayantilal on the boot with his first ball, had Wadekar caught behind off the fifth, and yorked Viswanath with the second ball of his second over. None of the batsmen scored and India was 3 for 4 after 20 balls. India eventually ended up with 164. In the Essex reply, Keith Fletcher scored his third hundred of the season in 223 minutes. Just before the declaration, Lever hit 37 in 25 minutes with 2 fours and 3 sixes. After reaching 163 for 3 an hour before tea on the final day, India lost five wickets in 20 overs. Essex needed 68 in 18 overs and managed it just in time.

=== v DH Robins' XI ===
At The Saffrons, Eastbourne, 30 June, July 1,2. DH Robins' XI (228–8 decl and 258–5 decl) drew with Indians (305–8 decl and 132–4).

Sardesai, Venkataraghavan and Solkar were rested and Govindraj played his first match. He took 2 for 20 in 12 overs in his opening spell. By tea, Robins' XI had lost seven wickets for 148. Chris Old and Kerry O'Keeffe added 71 for the ninth wicket when the innings was declared half an hour before the close. Still trying to solve the problem of the opening batsmen, India picked all the four openers in the touring party. Gavaskar and Baig opened, Jayantilal went in at one down and Mankad at five. After the quick exit of Baig and Jayantilal, Wadekar scored 45 with nine fours, four of them in a Greig over. Viswanath scored a hundred in 200 minutes with 15 fours. Robins' XI declared just before tea setting India 182 in around two hours. Baig scored 38 with six fours after which the match ended in a draw.

=== v Kent ===
At St Lawrence Ground, Canterbury, July 3,5,6. Kent (394–8 decl and 176–4 decl) drew with Indians (163 and 264–7).

Venkataraghavan captained the Indians. Dropped on 19, Brian Luckhurst scored 118 in three and a half hours with 15 fours and a six off Venkat. Luckhurst and Mike Denness made 125 for the first wicket and were separated just after lunch. Luckhurst was the fourth man out at 209 but Alan Knott and West Indian John Shepherd then added 96 runs quickly. Gavaskar had been rested, and the Indian openers were dismissed before close on the first day. The first five fell for 52 but yet again the lower half of the Indian batting outscored the top order. Despite a lead of 228, Denness chose to bat again and set Indians 408 to win in over a day. On a very cold final day, Viswanath and Ashok Mankad took the score to 137 for 1 at lunch but Shepherd dismissed Mankad and Sardesai in one over. Viswanath, however, scored his second successive hundred and shielded the later batsmen.

=== v Leicestershire ===
At Grace Road, Leicester July 7,8,9 Leicestershire (198 and 168) lost to Indians (416–7 decl) by an innings and 50 runs.

This match proved to be the turning point for the Indians who now began to win consistently. The match was played in warm sunshine before a crowd that included many Indians. Barry Dudleston and David Steele began with a stand of 50 runs in an hour before Chandra caught and bowled Steele. Baig ran Dudleston out for 51 and Solkar took a spectacular catch at short squareleg to dismiss Brian Davison. Leicestershire were dismissed before tea for 198. Gavaskar and Wadekar added 231 for the second wicket. Wadekar once swung Jack Birkenshaw over fineleg, shattering the window panes. India was 120 for 1 at close on the first day, and added another 125 without loss before lunch on the second. Wadekar was well caught by Birkenshaw at short midwicket having made 126 with 18 fours and the six. Gavaskar made 165 in five and a half fours with 21 fours. India declared after tea with a lead of 218. Leicestershire lost quick wickets on the last day before Chris Balderstone and Roger Tolchard added 72 for the fifth wicket. Tolchard was dropped by Solkar but Gavaskar had him caught at slip. The match ended ten minutes after lunch. Chandra returned figures of 5 for 63 and 6 for 64 (11 for 127).

=== v Warwickshire ===
At Edgbaston, Birmingham July 10,12,13 Warwickshire (377–3 decl and 182) lost to Indians (562) by an innings and 3 runs.

Indians recovered from a bad start to win by an innings. On the first day Jameson set about the Indian bowling to score 231 in 265 minutes with 31 fours and four sixes – one each off Bedi, Govindraj, Abid Ali and Prasanna. India rested Chandra for the match. Warwickshire scored 130 without loss in 30 overs before lunch on the first day. Bedi dismissed John Whitehouse and Rohan Kanhai in four balls. Jameson and Smith then added 241 in 149 minutes. Jameson was dropped at 132 and 143. On the latter occasion, Prasanna let the ball go off his hands for six, Govindraj being the bowler. After Warwickshire declared at the fall of Jameson, India made 94 for two on the first day, and another 416 runs on the second. Wadekar and Sardesai made 144 for the third wicket and Sardesai and Viswanath 118 for the fourth wicket. Sardesai scored 120 and Viswanath missed his third consecutive century by ten runs. India batted into the third day for Abid Ali to score a hundred. He missed it by seven runs and India was all out for 562. It was India's highest first class score in England. Jameson fell early, caught hooking Abid Ali. Bedi and Prasanna shared the other nine wickets as Warwickshire lost by an innings. India defeated Warwickshire for the first time in seven attempts.

=== v Glamorgan ===
At Sophia Gardens, Cardiff July 14,15,16 Indians (284 and 245–6 decl) df Glamorgan (203 and 224) by 102 runs.

Farokh Engineer was released by Lancashire to play in this match. Wadekar won his fourth toss in successive matches. Several Indian batsmen had a good start without going on to make a big score. Engineer top-scored making 62 of the 94 runs added by the last six wickets. Sixteen wickets fell on the second day. Majid Khan played a fine innings of 78 with 11 fours before Bedi bowled his with an arm-ball. But the last six Glamoran wickets added only 25. Venkataraghavan took 6 for 76. India lost the first three for 46 but Wadekar scored 73. Venkataraghavan made 57 including a six off Peter Walker. Needing 337 in the second innings, Glamorgan closed the second day on 11 for no loss. On the final day, Engineer missed two chances from Malcolm Nash who was also dropped by Baig. Nash top scored with 75. After being 185 for four at tea, Glamorgan were all out for 224. This time Bedi took six wickets. Both he and Venkat took nine wickets in the match.

=== v Hampshire ===
At Dean Park, Bournemouth July 17,19,20 Hampshire (198 and 271) lost to Indians (364 and 106 for 5) by five wickets.

For the last match before the first Test, India rested Bedi and Chandra who were both expected to be in Test side. The choice of the third spinner was between Prasanna and Venkat. Prasanna took 3 for 37 in the first innings while Venkat had 1 for 76. But in the second innings Venkat returned career best figures of 9 for 93. He only missed the ninth wicket of the innings, Larry Worrell falling to Solkar. This was to remain as the best bowling figures for the 1971 season. Prasanna took 0/81 in 33 overs. Venkat went on to play all the three Test matches while Prasanna did not appear in any.

Hampshire played without their regular opener Roy Marshall and fast bowler Bob Cottam. Barry Richards started off with two fours before being well caught and bowled by Solkar. Hampshire was all out for 198 before tea. On the second day Mankad scored a century in five hours while Viswanath scored his third hundred of the tour. Richards scored 45 including a six off Venkat while the other opener Richard Lewis top scored with 71 in 165 minutes and a six off Prasanna. Captain Richard Gilliat scored his second 50 of the match, batting only 135 minutes for 71 with ten fours and a six. India won by five wickets for their fourth win in a row.

=== v Minor Counties ===
At County Ground, Lakenham July 28,29,30 Minor Counties (203–5 decl and 199–6 decl) drew with Indians (252–3 decl and 26–0).

It rained for 14 hours before the scheduled start of the match and there was no play on the first day. Minor Counties declared at tea on the second day at 203. India in turn declared on 252, Solkar's 44* with two sixes and five fours being a bright knock. The match ended in a tame draw.

=== v Surrey ===
At The Oval 31 July, August 1,2 Surrey (269 and 257–4 decl) drew with Indians (326–8 decl).

The wicket provided little help to spinners and India rested Chandra and Venkataraghavan. Surrey, who were to win the County Championship in 1971, had Geoff Arnold, who was the twelfth man in the second Test, and Bob Willis. Graham Roope added 61 for the fourth wicket with Younis Ahmed and 63 with Intikhab Alam for the sixth wicket. Roope hit a six off Prasanna and six fours; Intikhab, two sixes off Bedi. Prasanna who had just recovered from a flu bowled all over the place but Bedi took 7 for 111.

India scored 28 runs in 90 minutes on the first day and took three hours to reach hundred. The crowd responded with slow hand clap. Mankad then hit four fours in three overs but got out for 77. Jayantilal scored only 36 runs in first two sessions on the second day. He was eventually run out for 84 in five hours and 11 fours. There was little point left in the match after India's declaration on the last day.

=== v Yorkshire ===
At Leeds 11, 12, 13 August Indians (145) drew with Yorkshire (137–3).

India won the toss and batted. Wadekar top scored with 50 in 85 minutes, out of 145 all out. Yorkshire reached 137 for 3 by lunch on the second day. Rain washed out the rest of the match.

=== v Nottinghamshire ===
At Nottingham 14, 16, 17 August Indians (168–6 decl and 145–4 decl) drew with Nottinghamshire (69–7 decl and 115–6).

The first seven hours of the match were rained off. India declared at 168 for 7 and Nottinghamshire, who had rested Garry Sobers, in turn declared immediately after saving the follow on. Following a third declaration after lunch on the third day, Notts had a target of 245 in 110 minutes plus 20 overs. At tea, they were 75 for two, and 94/4 at the start of the mandatory 20 overs. Though the sixth wicket fell with four overs left, Nottinghamshire saved the match.

Chandra took all six wickets in the second innings for figures of 20-8-34-6. These were curiously similar to his bowling in the third Test that began two days later.

=== v Sussex ===
At Hove 25, 26, 27 August Indians (220 and 276-7) drew with Sussex (386-9 decl).

Indians started this match the day after the finish of the third Test and were to spend the next three days playing Somerset at Taunton. Gavaskar scored 37 in 42 minutes with eight fours. Solkar, promoted to No. 4, made 90 in 215 minutes with nine fours and was the last man out. After the first six wickets fell for 126, he added 71 with Kirmani for the seventh wicket. Tony Greig took four wickets while John Snow failed to get any.

Mike Buss and Geoff Greenidge scored 199 before the first wicket fell. Buss who was 15 at the end of the first day reached his hundred before lunch on the second, out of 154. His eventual 140 was scored in 195 minutes with two sixes and eighteen does. Greenidge took 205 minutes for 62. Prasanna took 5 for 137 which was his best bowling for the tour in what was to be his last match. Sussex took a lead of 146.

Indians batted dourly to save the match. Jayantilal took three and a half hours for his 57 while Viswanath took two and a half for his 38. Indians were only 29 ahead when the seventh wicket fell and eighty minutes remained. Kirmani and D. Govindraj played out the time.

=== v Somerset ===
At Taunton 28, 29, 30 August Indians (349-8 decl and 162-5 decl) drew with Somerset (226-4 decl and 127-2).

India went from 31/0 to 57/4 with Tom Cartwright taking all the wickets. Solkar was dropped on 17, and survived again when Peter Robinson stepped on the ropes while taking a catch. Cartwright also dismissed Abbas Ali Baig after a fifth wicket stand of 71. He took 5/72 in a single spell of 29 overs. Solkar and Abid Ali added 134 for the sixth wicket. Solkar made 113 in 170 minutes with 18 fours and a six. India declared 22 minutes into the second day when Abid completed his hundred. He took 145 minutes over it and hit two sixes and 15 fours.

Bad light affected play on the first two days and there was no result despite two declarations on the final day. Brian Close scored his fifth hundred of the season, scoring 103* in 210 minutes with 15 fours. Somerset declared 123 runs behind. Wadekar made 74 (12 fours and one six) for India in the second innings. Somerset were 38/1 at tea and ended on 127/2. Cartwright completed a hundred wickets in a season for the eighth time and was awarded a silver tankard.

=== v Worcestershire ===
At New Road, Worcester 1, 2, 3 September Indians (383-3 decl and 150-8 decl) drew with Worcestershire (248 and 250-5).

Wadekar and Gavaskar started the match with tour aggregates of 909 and 811 runs. Just before tea on the first day, Wadekar completed his 1000. At the break he was 98 not out. After Jayantilal fell for two, Wadekar and Gavaskar added 327 for the second wicket. It was a record for the English season, improving on 301 by Phil Sharpe and Doug Padgett for Yorkshire against Glamorgan. Wadekar hit 16 fours, and two sixes off Kevin Griffith in his 150 in 321 minutes. His hundred took 234 minutes. India ended the first day on 363 for 2, Gavaskar 188 not out.

Gavaskar completed his thousand on the second morning but fell for 194. It was the highest score made for the Indians in the tour. The declaration came soon after at 383 for 3. Worcestershire's fifth wicket fell at 92 but John Parker and Keith Wilkinson added 100 for the sixth wicket. The 19-year-old Parker making his debut for the county, scored 91 and would go on to captain New Zealand. India declared at lunch on the final day 285 ahead and 210 minutes left. Worcestershire fell 40 runs short with Jim Yardley reaching a century.

=== v TN Pearce's XI ===
At North Marine Road Ground, Scarborough 4, 6, 7 September TN Pearce's XI (357-3 decl and 199-3 decl) drew with Indians (306 and 252-5).

Tom Pearce's XI put up 357 for 3 on the first day. Roy Virgin made a stylish century (176), adding 155 with Brian Bolus for the first wicket and 146 with Keith Fletcher for the third. Bolus was run out by Viswanath. Mankad carried his bat for 154* for India. He scored his fifty in 140 minutes and hundred in over four hours. Solkar hit a half century in 70 minutes.

Pearce's XI made 87 for one at the end of the second day. Bolus hit a six and 14 fours in 106*. Set 251 in 240 minutes after a declaration, India won with half an hour to spare. Gavaskar scored 128 in 155 minutes with ten fours and four sixes. He brought up his fifty in 65 minutes and hundred in 120, hitting Peter Parfitt for two sixes and a four in one over and Brian Close for a six and a four off consecutive balls in another.

== Sources ==
- Sunder Rajan, India vs England 1971, Jaico Publishing House.
- CricketArchive – tour itineraries

== Annual reviews ==
- Playfair Cricket Annual 1972
- Wisden Cricketers Almanack 1972
