= Bal (given name) =

Bal is a given name. People with the given name include:

- Bal Bahadur K.C. (born 1953), Nepali politician
- Bal Dani (1933–1999), Indian cricketer
- Bal David (born 1972), Filipino basketball player
- Bal Dhuri, Indian theatre actor
- Bal Dixit, American businessman
- Bal Gosal (born 1960), Canadian politician
- Bal Kadbet (1925–2010), Indian cricketer
- Bal Kudtarkar, Indian radio personality
- Bal Narsingh Kunwar (1783–1841), Nepalese Kaji and governor
- Bal Gopal Maharjan, Nepali football coach
- Bal Chandra Misra, Indian politician
- Bal Ram Nanda (1917–2010), Indian writer
- Bal Raj Nijhawan (1915–2014), Indian metallurgist
- Bal Pandit (1929–2015), Indian cricketer, writer and broadcaster
- Bal Kumar Patel (born 1964), India politician
- Bal Phondke (born 1939), Indian writer
- Bal Bahadur Rai (1921–2010), Nepali politician
- Bal Gopal Shrestha, Nepali cultural anthropologist
- Bal Krishna Singh (1916–1977), Indian politician
- Bal Thackeray (1926–2012), Indian politician
- Bal Gangadhar Tilak (1856–1920), Indian nationalist, social reformer and freedom fighter
