= Sharad Diwadkar =

Indian cricketer (1936–2005)

Personal information
- Full name: Sharad Jagannath Diwadkar
- Born: 11 January 1936; Bombay, British India
- Died: 1 March 2005 (aged 69); Mumbai, India
- Nickname: Jimmy
- Batting: Right-handed
- Bowling: Right-arm off-spin

Domestic team information
- Years: Team
- 1957–58 to 1973–74: Bombay
- 1963–64 to 1973–74: State Bank of India

Career statistics
Competition	First-class
Matches	82
Runs scored	1803
Batting average	24.04
100s/50s	1/10
Top score	177
Balls bowled	14,242
Wickets	211
Bowling average	26.17
5 wickets in innings	11
10 wickets in match	1
Best bowling	6/19
Catches/stumpings	54/–
- Source: CricketArchive, 14 July 2017

Sharad Jagannath Diwadkar (11 January 1936 in Bombay – 1 March 2005 in Mumbai) was a Bombay cricketer. He was an off-spinning all-rounder who played 82 first class matches between 1957–58 and 1973–74.

Diwadkar's best match bowling figures were 11 for 146 (5 for 74 and 6 for 72), when he helped State Bank of India recover from a first-innings deficit to win the final of the 1966–67 Moin-ud-Dowlah Gold Cup Tournament over Indian Starlets by 16 runs. His best innings figures were 6 for 19, off 20 overs, when Bombay beat Saurashtra by an innings in the 1965-66 Ranji Trophy. He made his highest score of 177 in the Ranji Trophy final of 1963-64, when Bombay defeated Rajasthan.
