= Robin Mukherjee =

Indian cricketer (1943–2009)

Personal information
- Full name: Rabinranath Mukherjee
- Born: 12 November 1943; Calcutta, Bengal, India
- Died: 14 March 2009 (aged 65); Kolkata
- Nickname: Robin
- Batting: Right-handed

Domestic team information
- Years: Team
- 1964-65: Railways
- 1966-67 to 1968-69: Bengal
- 1967-68: State Bank of India
- 1969-70 to 1970-71: R. K. Mody's XI
- 1969-70 to 1979-80: Bihar
- 1970-71 to 1973-74: East Zone

Career statistics
Competition	First-class
Matches	60
Runs scored	2984
Batting average	33.52
100s/50s	5/17
Top score	183
Balls bowled	150
Wickets	6
Bowling average	18.00
5 wickets in innings	0
10 wickets in match	0
Best bowling	2/3
Catches/stumpings	52/–
- Source: Cricinfo, 26 January 2015

Rabinranath "Robin" Mukherjee (12 November 1943 – 14 March 2009) was a cricketer who played first-class cricket for a number of teams in India from 1964 to 1980.

An opening batsman, Mukherjee played his first first-class match in 1964-65 for Railways against Jammu and Kashmir, scoring 90 not out in the second innings before his captain declared. He moved to Bengal, and in 1966-67, on his first appearance for the team, he made 111 against Bihar. In 1967-68, on his first appearance for State Bank of India in the Moin-ud-Dowlah Gold Cup Tournament, he made 183 in 260 minutes, putting on 233 for the third wicket with Hanumant Singh.

He moved to Bihar in 1969. In 1970-71 he made 288 runs at 48.00 in the Ranji Trophy as Bihar progressed to the semi-finals for only the third time. He made 58, the only score of the match over 30, as Bihar beat Assam by an innings, then 53 when Bihar gained a first-innings lead over Bengal to progress to the finals. Against Mysore in the quarter-final he scored 130 to help Bihar to a two-run first-innings lead and a place in the semi-final, which they lost to Punjab. He continued to play regularly for Bihar until 1977-78. Later he served as a selector for Bengal and as chief curator of pitches for East Zone.

He was not related to Raja Mukherjee, who played as a batsman for Bengal in the late 1960s and 1970s. They opened the batting together in 1967-68, making 112 for the first wicket in their first partnership.
