= Frank Warne =

Australian cricketer (1906–1994)

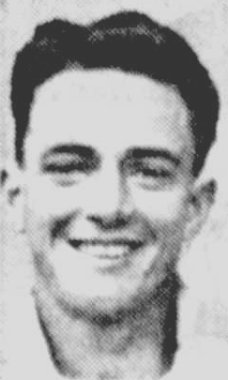
- Warne in c. 1935

Personal information
- Full name: Frank Belmont Warne
- Born: 3 October 1906; North Carlton, Victoria, Australia
- Died: 29 May 1994 (aged 87); Edenvale, Gauteng, South Africa
- Batting: Left-handed
- Bowling: Right-arm leg break
- Relatives: Tom Warne (father)

Domestic team information
- Years: Team
- 1926/27–1928/29: Victoria
- 1934–1938: Worcestershire
- 1934/35–1937/38: Europeans
- 1941/42: Transvaal

Career statistics
Competition	FC
Matches	95
Runs scored	3,275
Batting average	21.40
100s/50s	3/13
Top score	115
Balls bowled	7,939
Wickets	138
Bowling average	34.78
5 wickets in innings	4
10 wickets in match	1
Best bowling	6/51
Catches/stumpings	30/–
- Source: CricketArchive, 5 August 2008

Frank Belmont Warne (3 October 1906 – 29 May 1994) was an Australian first-class cricketer who played for teams on four continents during a 95-game career that stretched from the mid-1920s to the early 1940s.

== Early life ==
Warne was born in North Carlton, a suburb of Melbourne, Victoria. His father, Tom Warne, played 46 first-class cricket matches, mostly for Victoria.

== Early career in Australia ==
Warne made his first-class debut for Victoria against Tasmania at the MCG in January 1927. He scored 20 in his only innings, and picked up five wickets in the match as Victoria won the game by an innings. Although he played several minor games for Victoria Colts over the next couple of seasons – he once took 12 wickets against South Australia Colts — his only other first-class appearance for Victoria came against Tasmania (again) in February 1929. Warne opened the batting in the first innings, but made only 1; he was more successful with 33 not out down the order in the second innings. He never played in the Sheffield Shield.

== Career in England and India ==
It was five years before Warne would taste first-class cricket again, and when the time came it was in England, for Worcestershire, taking 3–33 in the first innings against Oxford University. Late in the season, he played three County Championship games, hitting 62 against Yorkshire. That winter, he went to India and after one appearance for the Indian University Occasionals against a Viceroy's XI, he played for Retrievers in the Moin-ud-Dowlah Gold Cup Tournament. After a win by a concession in the semi-final (opponents Hyderabad Cricket Association XI were heading for an innings defeat) Retrievers won the final against Freelooters by three wickets, although Warne's contribution was minimal (one wicket, one catch and 2 in his only innings). He then played for the Europeans against the Hindus in the Bombay Quadrangular, taking four first-innings wickets and scoring 49 and 1, though the Europeans were defeated by an innings.

Warne was back with Worcestershire for the 1935 English season, and had the most successful summer of his career. He hit precisely 1,000 first-class runs (the only time he ever achieved that landmark), and took 44 wickets, by some distance his highest season's tally. From then until 1938, he was largely a county player, although in both 1935–36 and 1937–38 (but not 1936–37) he went back to India in the English winters to play for a variety of teams, including three times for the semi-official Australians in 1935–36 and once in each season for the Europeans. His best first-class bowling return was the 6-51 he took for Worcestershire against Northamptonshire in July 1935, while in May 1936, he made his highest first-class score when he struck 115 for Worcestershire against Lancashire. After leaving the first class game, Warne played for Rishton in 1939 and 1946, before moving north to Lancaster in the Ribblesdale League, where he enjoyed great success and by 18 June 1949, in barely two and a half seasons taking 266 league wickets.

== Later career in South Africa ==
Warne made no first-class appearances in 1939, instead turning out (with some success) as the professional for Rishton in the Lancashire League. He then went to South Africa and played once for Transvaal in 1941–42. His career came to an end the following season, when he played two games. The first was in December 1942 for The Rest against an Air Force XI, in which he scored 108; while his last first-class game of all came in March 1943, when he appeared for The Rest against the First South African Division; he took five wickets in the match and scored 21 and 42*.

Warne died on 29 May 1994 in Edenvale, Gauteng, South Africa, at the age of 87.

== See also ==
- List of Victoria first-class cricketers
