= Anand Shukla =

Indian cricketer (1941–2015)

Personal information
- Born: 15 January 1941; Kanpur, United Provinces, British India
- Died: 2 February 2015 (aged 74); Ghaziabad, Uttar Pradesh, India
- Batting: Right-handed
- Bowling: Right-arm leg-spin
- Relatives: Rakesh Shukla (brother)

Domestic team information
- Years: Team
- 1959/60–1964/65: Uttar Pradesh
- 1962/63–1964/65: Central Zone
- 1965/66: Delhi
- 1965/66: North Zone
- 1965/66–1966/67: Indian Starlets
- 1966/67–1974/75: Bihar
- 1966/67–1974/75: East Zone
- 1969/70–1971/72: R. K. Mody's XI
- 1975/76–1977/78: Uttar Pradesh

Career statistics
Competition	First-class	List A
Matches	98	3
Runs scored	4,312	27
Batting average	33.68	9.00
100s/50s	9/24	0/0
Top score	242*	26
Balls bowled	17,833	72
Wickets	386	2
Bowling average	21.00	14.50
5 wickets in innings	31	0
10 wickets in match	9	0
Best bowling	8/50	2/29
Catches/stumpings	74/–	1/–
- Source: ESPNcricinfo, 26 January 2015

Anand Shukla (15 January 1941 – 2 February 2015) was an Indian cricketer who played first-class cricket for a number of teams in India from 1960 to 1978.

== Playing career ==
=== For Uttar Pradesh ===
In his third first-class match in his debut season of 1959–60, Shukla took 7 for 91 against Vidarbha. In 1961–62, against Rajasthan, he took 7 for 43 and 3 for 87, and made 168 not out, taking Uttar Pradesh's score from 88 for 6 when he went to the wicket to 356 all out.

He captained Uttar Pradesh in 1963–64 and 1964–65. In 1964–65, in eight matches, he made 567 runs at an average of 43.61 and took 41 wickets at a rate of 22.21 per wicket. Uttar Pradesh reached the semi-finals of the Ranji Trophy for the first time, but they lost to Hyderabad by an innings; Shukla top-scored in each innings with 60 and 83, but had bowling figures of 3 for 253 in 63 overs. Earlier, in the victory over Madhya Pradesh, he had made 28 and 96 (the top score in the match) and taken 6 for 63 and 6 for 102.

=== For Delhi ===
Shukla played one season for Delhi in 1965–66, and also represented North Zone in the Duleep Trophy.

=== For Bihar ===
Shukla moved to Bihar in 1966–67, and stayed there for nine seasons. In his third match he took 5 for 14 and 5 for 36 against Assam at Jorhat. Against Orissa in 1967–68 he scored 242 not out and took 5 for 68 and 3 for 43 in an innings victory.

He captained Bihar in 1968–69, but while they beat Assam and Orissa they lost to Bengal, who took the East Zone place in the finals of the Ranji Trophy. In 1969–70 he took 17 wickets at 16.82 and made 101 runs for once out when R. K. Mody's XI won the Moin-ud-Dowlah Gold Cup Tournament. He took his best-ever figures of 8 for 50 in the semi-final.

In 1970-71 Shukla made two centuries in the Ranji Trophy, including 111 not out in a team total of 205 in the second innings when Bihar lost their quarter-final narrowly to Mysore. In 1972–73 in an innings victory over Assam at Jorhat he took 7 for 34 and 2 for 36 and made 137. In 1974–75, when Bihar beat Assam by an innings at Jorhat, he took 5 for 15 and 2 for 26, giving him 17 for 91 in two matches on the ground.

=== Return to Uttar Pradesh ===
Shukla played three more seasons for Uttar Pradesh from 1975–76 to 1977–78. He was less successful than in previous seasons, and was not selected to play in the Duleep Trophy. Against Vidarbha in 1975–76 he scored his last century, 100, after taking five wickets in the first innings. The next season, also against Vidarbha, he made 59 and 35 and took 5 for 36 and 6 for 104.

== Overall record ==
While Shukla was a prominent Ranji Trophy player, he was not able to repeat his success in the stronger competition of the Duleep Trophy. In 19 Duleep Trophy matches for Central Zone, North Zone and East Zone from 1962–63 to 1974–75 he scored 552 runs at 21.15 and took 36 wickets at 36.55. By contrast, in nine Ranji Trophy matches against Orissa, one of the weaker teams at the time, he made 734 runs at 81.55 and took 69 wickets at 10.95.

== Later career ==
Shukla became involved in cricket administration, and served on the pitch committee of the Board of Control for Cricket in India.

== Family ==
Shukla's younger brother Rakesh Shukla, who was also a batsman and leg-spinner, played one Test match for India in 1982.
