= Nariman Marshall =

Indian cricketer (1905–1979)

Personal information
- Full name: Nariman Darabsha Marshall
- Born: 3 January 1905; Bombay, British India
- Died: 29 August 1979 (aged 74); Jaipur, India
- Batting: Right-handed
- Bowling: Right-arm slow-medium

Domestic team information
- Years: Team
- 1928-29 to 1934-35: Parsees
- 1931-32 to 1932-33: Freelooters
- 1933-34 to 1934-35: Western India
- 1936-37 to 1937-38: Nawanagar

Career statistics
Competition	First-class
Matches	27
Runs scored	1006
Batting average	22.86
100s/50s	2/4
Top score	120
Balls bowled	552
Wickets	12
Bowling average	27.91
5 wickets in innings	0
10 wickets in match	0
Best bowling	3/17
Catches/stumpings	12/–
- Source: CricketArchive, 22 February 2018

Nariman Darabsha Marshall (3 January 1905 – 29 August 1979) was an Indian cricketer who played first-class cricket from 1928 to 1938.

Nariman Marshall was a lower middle-order batsman and occasional opener, as well as an occasional slow-medium bowler and wicket-keeper. After doing well in the trial matches in 1931–32 he was selected to tour England with India's first Test touring team in 1932. However, he was unable to make the most of his infrequent opportunities on tour and did not play in the Test match. The highlight of his tour was an unbeaten 102 batting at number nine to save the match against Warwickshire, when he added 217 for the eighth wicket in 140 minutes with C. K. Nayudu.

His highest first-class score was 120 in one of the trial matches in 1931–32. A month earlier he had taken his best bowling figures of 3 for 17 to help Freelooters win the Moin-ud-Dowlah Gold Cup Tournament.

Marshall umpired several Ranji Trophy matches between 1937 and 1940, including two in the 1937–38 competition, when he later played for Nawanagar in the final. In the 1960s he coached the Royal Cricket Club in Jaipur.
