= Devraj Govindraj =

Indian cricketer (born 1947)

Personal information
- Full name: Devraj Devendraraj Govindraj
- Born: 2 January 1947 (age 79); Hyderabad, Hyderabad State, British India
- Batting: Right-handed
- Bowling: Right-arm fast-medium

Domestic team information
- Years: Team
- 1964–65 to 1974–75: Hyderabad
- 1966–67 to 1971–72: State Bank of India
- 1966–67 to 1970–71: South Zone

Career statistics
Competition	First-class	List A
Matches	93	3
Runs scored	1202	0
Batting average	13.50	–
100s/50s	0/5	0/0
Top score	72	0*
Balls bowled	10,087	150
Wickets	190	3
Bowling average	27.66	21.33
5 wickets in innings	5	0
10 wickets in match	2	–
Best bowling	6/38	2/14
Catches/stumpings	36/–	0
- Source: ESPNcricinfo, 7 March 2014

Devraj Devendraraj Govindraj (born 2 January 1947) is a former fast bowler who played first-class cricket in India from 1964–65 to 1974–75. He toured the West Indies in 1970–71 and England in 1971, but did not play Test cricket. He is the nephew of C. K. Nayudu, India's first test captain.

== Early career ==
Govindraj began his career with Hyderabad in the Ranji Trophy in 1964–65, opening the bowling and batting in the tail. In 1966–67 his 59 batting at number nine helped State Bank of India win the Moin-ud-Dowlah Gold Cup Tournament for the first time.

He attended a training camp that was held to help select the Indian team to tour Australia and New Zealand in 1967–68, but Umesh Kulkarni and Ramakant Desai were selected ahead of him. In domestic cricket in India in 1967–68 he took 23 wickets at 26.95, without taking more than three wickets in an innings. He again helped State Bank of India win the Moin-ud-Dowlah Gold Cup Tournament, making his career top score of 72 at number eight after State Bank of India had been 123 for 6 in the first innings of the final. He played for an Indian XI against the touring International XI in February 1968, taking the wickets of Khalid Ibadulla (twice) and Ken Suttle.

He began the 1968–69 season with a short tour of Ceylon with State Bank of India. In the match against Ceylon Board President's Under-27s XI he took the best innings figures (6 for 38 in the second innings) and match figures (11 for 70) of his career in an innings victory. Two months later he took his best figures in the Ranji Trophy with 5 for 21 and 5 for 75 in an innings victory for Hyderabad over Andhra.

== Playing for India ==
After taking 24 wickets in the 1970–71 Indian season at an average of 29.00, including 5 for 114 for South Zone against East Zone in the Duleep Trophy, Govindraj was selected for the tours of the West Indies and England. Although he was the only fast bowler in the team, he did not play any of the Tests, the selectors preferring to open with the medium-paced all-rounders Eknath Solkar and Syed Abid Ali and rely on three specialist spinners to take most of the wickets. He played five first-class matches in the West Indies and bowled only 91.5 overs, taking 10 wickets at 37.60. In England he played 16 matches, but took only 11 wickets at 61.27.

He played for an Indian XI against Rest of India in a match in aid of the Defence Fund in 1971–72, but took no wickets. He played on for a few more seasons before dropping out of first-class cricket at the age of 27.

== After cricket ==
Govindraj worked for the State Bank of India during his cricket career. Later he drove buses in London, and more recently he was a cricket coach.
