= Bal Kadbet =

Indian cricketer (1925–2010)

Personal information
- Full name: Balkrishna V. Kadbet
- Born: 4 December 1925
- Died: 26 June 2010 (aged 84)
- Role: Bowler

Domestic team information
- Years: Team
- 1961/62–1971/72: Associated Cement Company

Career statistics
Competition	First-class
Matches	11
Runs scored	75
Batting average	7.50
100s/50s	0/0
Top score	16*
Balls bowled	1566
Wickets	20
Bowling average	32.30
5 wickets in innings	0
10 wickets in match	0
Best bowling	4/29
Catches/stumpings	5/–
- Source: CricketArchive, 24 March 2014

Balkrishna V. Kadbet (4 December 1925 – 26 June 2010) was an Indian cricketer who played 11 first-class matches for Associated Cement Company between 1961 and 1971.

After attending Poddar College, where he captained the cricket team, Kadbet joined Associated Cement Company, working there in administration and playing in the company cricket team for more than 25 years. When the Associated Cement Company team played first-class cricket he played in 11 of its 13 matches, taking 20 wickets and finishing third among the team's wicket-takers behind Bapu Nadkarni (51) and Polly Umrigar (40).

His best bowling figures, 4 for 29, came in his first first-class match, against Pakistan Eaglets during Associated Cement Company's brief tour of Pakistan in 1961–62. In a friendly match in aid of the National Defence Fund in 1962–63, he was the leading wicket-taker for Associated Cement Company in their victory over the Andhra Chief Minister's XI, taking 3 for 33 and 2 for 18, and also made his highest score of 16 not out, batting at number 10. He took 4 for 34 (off 35 overs) in the final of the Moin-ud-Dowlah Gold Cup Tournament against Maharaj Kumar of Vizianagram's XI in 1963–64.
