= David N. Gellner =

British social anthropologist

David N. Gellner FBA (born 1957) is an Emeritus Professor of Social anthropology and an Emeritus Fellow of All Souls College in the University of Oxford. He is a region specialist of South Asia, particularly Nepal. He was elected as a Fellow of the British Academy in 2024.

== Early life and education ==
Gellner is the son of Susan Gellner (née Ryan) and Ernest Gellner. He was brought up near Petersfield, Hampshire, and attended Churcher’s College Grammar School.

Gellner received his BA degree in PPE (politics, philosophy, and economics) at Balliol College, Oxford, in 1979. He then studied an MPhil in Indian Religion, also at Oxford, 1979-81. In 1981 he moved from Balliol to Wolfson College for his DPhil on Newar Buddhism in the Kathmandu Valley. His DPhil was supervised by Richard Gombrich and examined by Nicholas Allen and Michael Witzel. He also received guidance on Tantrism from Alexis Sanderson. The monograph based on his DPhil, Monk, Householder, and Tantric Priest, is widely recognized as the authoritative account of Newar Buddhism.

He is married to the anthropologist Dolores P. Martinez.

== Career ==
After a Junior Research Fellowship at St John’s College, Oxford, 1986-1990, Gellner held a British Academy Postdoctoral Fellowship, 1990-94. For the last two years he held it concurrently with a 0.5 position in anthropology at Oxford Brookes University. From 1994 to 2002 he was a lecturer, then senior lecturer, and then reader in social anthropology at Brunel University. From 2002 to 2008 he was the University Lecturer in the Anthropology of South Asia in Oxford, with a Fellowship at Wolfson College, where he is now an honorary fellow. From 2003-2004 he was a Visiting Professor at the Tokyo University of Foreign Studies. In 2008 he was elected to the statutory chair in social anthropology, Oxford, which had formerly been held, among others, by Radcliffe-Brown, Evans-Pritchard, and David Parkin. His successor in the chair is Alpa Shah.

Gellner was twice head of department of the School of Anthropology and Museum Ethnography (SAME) in Oxford, 2009-2012 and 2016-18. From 2020 to 2023 he was Director of the Institute of Human Sciences within SAME.

Gellner’s research interests have broadened out from his early focus on Buddhism, Hinduism, religion, ritual, and ethnicity to encompass spirit possession and medical anthropology, politics, borderlands, migration and diasporas, cultural capital, class, and inequality. He has given named lectures in Oxford, Toronto, Kathmandu, Oxford, London, Prague, and online for the Indian Sociological Society. He has co-authored many ethnographic articles, notably with Krishna Adhikari, Krishna Hachhethu, Bal Gopal Shrestha, and Mrigendra Karki on Nepal, and with Sanjay K. Pandey and Shashank Chaturvedi on eastern UP, India. Gellner is an academic advisor to the Centre for Nepal Studies UK, and Pasa Puchah Guthi, UK.

The book that Gellner co-edited with Krishna P. Adhikari, Nepal's Dalits in Transition, won the 2025 Surya Subedi Prize, awarded by the Royal Asiatic Society for the best book or article in Nepal Studies of the previous year.

== Selected Publications ==
=== Books ===
- Nepal’s Dalits in Transition (Vajra, 2024) (ed. with K.P. Adhikari)
- Re-Creating Anthropology: Sociality, Matter, and the Imagination (ASA conference volume) (Routledge. 2022) (ed. with D.P. Martinez)
- Global Nepalis: Religion, Culture, and Community in a New and Old Diaspora (OUP, 2018) (ed. with S.L. Hausner)
- Religion, Secularism, and Ethnicity in Contemporary Nepal. (OUP, 2016) (ed. with S.L. Hausner & C. Letizia)
- Borderland Lives in Northern South Asia (Duke University Press, 2013) (ed.)
- Ethnic Activism and Civil Society in South Asia (Sage, 2009) (ed.)
- Nationalism and Ethnicity in Nepal [2^{nd} ed. of Nationalism and Ethnicity in a Hindu Kingdom] (Vajra, 2008) (ed. with J. Pfaff-Czarnecka & J. Whelpton)
- Rebuilding Buddhism: The Theravada Movement in Twentieth-Century Nepal (Harvard University Press, 2005) (with S. LeVine)
- The Anthropology of Buddhism and Hinduism: Weberian Themes (OUP, 2001)
- Monk, Householder, and Tantric Priest: Newar Buddhism and its Hierarchy of Ritual (Cambridge University Press, 1992)

=== Selected recent articles ===
- ‘Living with Polytropy and Hierarchy: The Anthropology of Hinduism’ in S. Coleman & J. Robbins (eds) The Oxford Handbook of the Anthropology of Religion, pp. 273–90. OUP, 2026. 9780199676217
- 'Mandir vs Mandal in 2024: Are There Limits to the BJP’s Social Engineering?' (with Chaturvedi & S.K. Pandey) Contemporary South Asia 1–22, 2026 https://doi.org/10.1080/09584935.2026.261907
- ‘Liberalism and Hierarchy: A Tension-filled Relationship as Seen from Social Anthropology’ (L. Holy Lecture) Cargo 2024/1: 4–30, 2024. r1v53jz638
- ‘The Persistence of Hierarchy: Paradoxes of Dominance in Nepal and Beyond’ (2021 M.N. Srinivas Memorial Lecture) Sociological Bulletin 73(2): 127–47, 2024. https://journals.sagepub.com/doi/epub/10.1177/00380229241230721
- ‘The Spaces of Religion: A View from South Asia’ (Henry Myers Lecture 2020) JRAI (N.S.) 29: 553–72, 2023. https://rai.onlinelibrary.wiley.com/doi/epdf/10.1111/1467-9655.13955
- ‘The Last Hindu King: How Nepal Desanctified its Monarchy’ in A.A. Moin & A. Strathern (eds) Sacred Kingship in World History: Between Immanence and Transcendence, pp. 271–98. Columbia University Press, 2022
- ‘Religion and Secularism in Contemporary Nepal’ (with C. Letizia) in K. Jacobsen (ed.) Routledge Handbook of South Asian Religions, pp. 335–54. Routledge, 2021
- ‘Guarding the Guards: Education, Corruption, and Nepal’s Commission for the Investigation of Abuse of Authority (CIAA)’ (with K.P. Adhikari) Public Anthropologist 2: 177–200, 2020. https://brill.com/view/journals/puan/2/2/article-p177_177.xml
- Masters of Hybridity: How Activists Reshaped Nepali Society’ JRAI 25(2): 265–82, 2019. https://onlinelibrary.wiley.com/doi/full/10.1111/1467-9655.13025
- ‘Politics in Gorakhpur since the 1920s: The Making of a Safe “Hindu” Constituency’ (with S. Chaturvedi & S.K. Pandey), Contemporary South Asia 27(1): 40–57, 2019. 10.1080/09584935.2018.1521785
- ‘Civilization as a Key Guiding Idea in South Asia’ in J.P. Arnason & C. Hann (eds) Anthropology and Civilizational Analysis: Eurasian Explorations, pp. 99–119. SUNY Press, 2018
- ‘New Identity Politics and the 2012 Collapse of Nepal’s Constituent Assembly: When the Dominant becomes “Other”’ (with K.P. Adhikari) Modern Asian Studies 50(6): 2009–40, 2016. DOI:http://dx.doi.org/10.1017/S0026749X15000438
- ‘The Idea of Nepal’ (Mahesh Chandra Regmi Lecture 2016). https://soscbaha.org/wp-content/uploads/2019/11/mcrl2016.pdf
