= International cricket in 1970–71 =

International cricket season

The 1970–71 international cricket season was from September 1970 to April 1971.

== Season overview ==
International tours
Start date	Home team	Away team	Results [Matches]			
Start date	Home team	Away team	Test	ODI	FC	LA
27 November 1970	Australia	England	0–2 [7]	1–0 [1]	—	—
18 February 1971	West Indies	India	0–1 [5]	—	—	—
25 February 1971	New Zealand	England	0–1 [2]	—	—	—

== November ==
=== England in Australia ===
Test series
No.	Date	Home captain	Away captain	Venue	Result
Test 674	27 Nov–2 December	Bill Lawry	Ray Illingworth	The Gabba, Brisbane	Match drawn
Test 675	11–16 December	Bill Lawry	Ray Illingworth	WACA Ground, Perth	Match drawn
Test 675a	31 Dec–5 January	Bill Lawry	Ray Illingworth	Melbourne Cricket Ground, Melbourne	Match abandoned
Test 676	9–14 January	Bill Lawry	Ray Illingworth	Sydney Cricket Ground, Sydney	England by 299 runs
Test 677	21–26 January	Bill Lawry	Ray Illingworth	Melbourne Cricket Ground, Melbourne	Match drawn
Test 678	29 Jan–3 February	Bill Lawry	Ray Illingworth	Adelaide Oval, Adelaide	Match drawn
Test 679	12–17 February	Ian Chappell	Ray Illingworth	Sydney Cricket Ground, Sydney	England by 62 runs
One-off ODI Match
No.	Date	Home captain	Away captain	Venue	Result
ODI 1	5 January	Bill Lawry	Ray Illingworth	Melbourne Cricket Ground, Melbourne	Australia by 5 wickets

== February ==
=== India in the West Indies ===
Test series
No.	Date	Home captain	Away captain	Venue	Result
Test 680	18–23 February	Garfield Sobers	Ajit Wadekar	Sabina Park, Kingston	Match drawn
Test 683	6–10 March	Garfield Sobers	Ajit Wadekar	Queen's Park Oval, Port of Spain	India by 7 wickets
Test 684	19–24 March	Garfield Sobers	Ajit Wadekar	Bourda, Georgetown	Match drawn
Test 685	1–6 April	Garfield Sobers	Ajit Wadekar	Kensington Oval, Bridgetown	Match drawn
Test 686	13–19 April	Garfield Sobers	Ajit Wadekar	Queen's Park Oval, Port of Spain	Match drawn

=== England in New Zealand ===
Test series
No.	Date	Home captain	Away captain	Venue	Result
Test 681	25 Feb–1 March	Graham Dowling	Ray Illingworth	AMI Stadium, Christchurch	England by 8 wickets
Test 682	5–8 March	Graham Dowling	Ray Illingworth	Eden Park, Auckland	Match drawn
