= List of India national cricket coaches =

Head coach of the Indian men's national cricket team
- Incumbent; Gautam Gambhir since 10 July 2024
- Board of Control for Cricket in India
- Status: Head coach of the Indian men's national cricket team
- Appointer: Board of Control for Cricket in India
- Formation: 1971 (55 years ago)
- First holder: Keki Tarapore

Head coach of the Indian women's national cricket team
- Incumbent; Amol Muzumdar since October 2023
- Board of Control for Cricket in India
- Status: Head coach of the Indian women's national cricket team
- Formation: 2003 (23 years ago)
- First holder: Sudha Shah

This is a list of head coaches of the men's and women's Indian national cricket teams. India has been a full member of International Cricket Council since 1926 and played its first test match on 25 June 1932 becoming the fifth country to do so. In July 2024, Gautam Gambhir became the men's head coach succeeding Rahul Dravid.

India won the 1983 Cricket World Cup under the captaincy of Kapil Dev when PR Man Singh was the coach. In 2007, India won the inaugural T20 World cup under Dhoni when Lalchand Rajput was the coach. In 2011, they won the ODI world cup for the second time under Dhoni when Gary Kirsten was the coach. India has also won three Champions trophies in 2002, 2013, and 2025 when coached by John Wright, Duncan Fletcher, and Gautam Gambhir respectively.

== Men's coaches ==
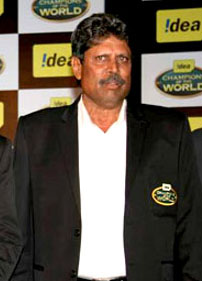
Kapil Dev who was the captain when India won their first world cup also served as a coach

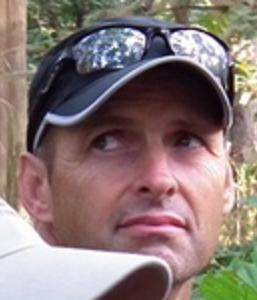
Gary Kirsten was the coach when India won the 2011 Cricket World Cup

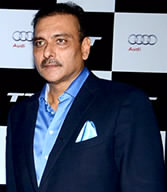
Ravi Shastri had the longest span across three stints

List of men's head coaches
Name	Tenure	Nationality
Keki Tarapore	1971	India
Hemu Adhikari	1971–1974	India
Gulabrai Ramchand	1975	India
Datta Gaekwad	1978	India
Salim Durrani	1980–1981	India
Ashok Mankad	1982	India
PR Man Singh	1983–1987	India
Chandu Borde	1988	India
Bishan Singh Bedi	1990–1991	India
Abbas Ali Baig	1991–1992	India
Ajit Wadekar	1992–1996	India
Sandeep Patil	1996	India
Madan Lal	1996–1997	India
Anshuman Gaekwad	1997–1999	India
Kapil Dev	1999–2000	India
John Wright	2000–2005	New Zealand
Greg Chappell	2005–2007	Australia
Ravi Shastri (Interim)	2007	India
Lalchand Rajput	2007–2008	India
Gary Kirsten	2008–2011	South Africa
Duncan Fletcher	2011–2015	Zimbabwe
Ravi Shastri	2014–2016	India
Sanjay Bangar (Interim)	2016	India
Anil Kumble	2016–2017	India
Sanjay Bangar (Interim)	2017	India
Ravi Shastri	2017–2021	India
Rahul Dravid	2021–2024	India
VVS Laxman (Interim)	2024 (Tour of Zimbabwe & Tour of South Africa)	India
Gautam Gambhir	2024–present	India

== Women's coaches ==
List of Women's head coaches
Name	Tenure	Nationality
Sudha Shah	2003–2007	India
Shantha Rangaswamy	2003–2007	India
Sudha Shah	2008–2010	India
K. V. P. Rao	2010	India
Anju Jain	2011–2013	India
Tushar Arothe	2013–2014	India
Purnima Rau	2014	India
Sudha Shah	2014	India
Purnima Rau	2015–2017	India
Tushar Arothe	2017–2018	India
Ramesh Powar	2018	India
WV Raman	2018–2021	India
Ramesh Powar	2021–2022	India
Amol Muzumdar	2023–present	India

== See also ==
- List of India national cricket captains
