= Rohinton Baria Trophy =

The All-India Inter-University Cricket Championship held for the Rohinton Baria Gold Trophy (or simply, Rohinton Baria Trophy) is India's premier inter-university cricket tournament. It has been contested annually since the 1935/36 season.

== History ==
The trophy was donated in 1935 by Ardeshir Dadabhoy Baria of Bombay in memory of his son Rohinton, for a tournament to be played between the Indian universities. Initially, the Board of Control for Cricket in India (BCCI) organised the tournament, but the Inter-University Sports Board of India (IUSB) took over in 1940/41.

The university teams compete in zones before the winners and runners-up from each zone play off in semi-finals and finals. Until 1989/90, when the format was changed to a one-day 50-over contest, the finals were usually held over three or four days at the campus of one of the finalists or at a neutral venue. Sometimes matches were played to a finish regardless of time; the 1956-57 match went on for eight days and finished when Bombay University, having set Delhi University 728 to win, dismissed them for 611 in 304.1 overs.

Apart from Indian universities, Ceylon University also participated from 1947/48 to 1969/70. The only university from the future Pakistan to compete before Partition was the University of the Punjab in Lahore, which won the title four times.

In its early decades participation in the tournament helped prepare many future Test and first-class players, especially in the larger universities. In their team that won the 1940/41 final, Bombay University had four future Indian Test players (Ranga Sohoni, Hemu Adhikari, Chandra Sarwate and Sadu Shinde), while in their 1958/59 champion team they had five future Test players (Arvind Apte, Dilip Sardesai, Ajit Wadekar – who scored 324 in the final – Farokh Engineer and Ramakant Desai). In their 1945–46 team Punjab University included seven players (Nazar Mohammad, Imtiaz Ahmed, Maqsood Ahmed, Abdul Hafeez Kardar, Fazal Mahmood, Khan Mohammad and Shujauddin Butt) who later played a prominent part in Pakistan's Test successes in the 1950s. In the 1966–67 final Sunil Gavaskar played for Bombay University, in 1972-73 Mohinder Amarnath led Delhi University to victory, and Sanjay Manjrekar's six consecutive centuries for Bombay University propelled him into Bombay's Ranji Trophy team.

According to the writer and former Rohinton Baria Trophy and Ranji Trophy player Venkatraman Ramnarayan, the Rohinton Baria provided a valuable "finishing school" for future leaders, and a model of dignified behaviour on the sports field which is now lacking. With the rise of widespread junior competitions and coaching for young players, interest in inter-university cricket has waned in recent decades. According to Harsha Bhogle, who played for Osmania University, the growth of under-19 cricket destroyed university cricket.

== Winners ==
Season	Winner	Runner-up	3rd Place	4th Place
1935/36	Punjab University	Bombay University	N/A	N/A
1936/37	Punjab University	Nagpur University	N/A	N/A
1937/38	Punjab University	Aligarh Muslim University	N/A	N/A
1938/39	Bombay University	Punjab University	N/A	N/A
1939/40	Bombay University	Mysore University	N/A	N/A
1940/41	Bombay University	Benares Hindu University	N/A	N/A
1941/42	Bombay University	Punjab University	N/A	N/A
1942/43	Bombay University	Aligarh Muslim University	N/A	N/A
1943/44	Punjab University	Madras University	N/A	N/A
1944/45	Bombay University	Punjab University	N/A	N/A
1945/46	Bombay University	Punjab University	N/A	N/A
1946/47	Bombay University	Aligarh Muslim University	N/A	N/A
1947/48	Bombay University	Agra University	N/A	N/A
1948/49	Bombay University	Calcutta University	N/A	N/A
1949/50	Bombay University	Calcutta University	N/A	N/A
1950/51	Mysore University	Delhi University	N/A	N/A
1951/52	Mysore University	Allahabad University	N/A	N/A
1952/53	Bombay University	Delhi University	N/A	N/A
1953/54	Delhi University	Mysore University	N/A	N/A
1954/55	Bombay University	Panjab University	N/A	N/A
1955/56	Bombay University	Delhi University	N/A	N/A
1956/57	Bombay University	Delhi University	N/A	N/A
1957/58	Bombay University	Panjab University	N/A	N/A
1958/59	Bombay University	Delhi University	N/A	N/A
1959/60	Delhi University	Bombay University	N/A	N/A
1960/61	Bombay University	Allahabad University	N/A	N/A
1961/62	Mysore University	Bombay University	N/A	N/A
1962/63	Poona University	Madras University	N/A	N/A
1963/64	Bombay University	Madras University	N/A	N/A
1964/65	Bombay University	Calcutta University	N/A	N/A
1965/66	Bombay University	Bangalore University	N/A	N/A
1966/67	Osmania University	Bombay University	N/A	N/A
1967/68	Calcutta University	Indore University	N/A	N/A
1968/69	Delhi University	Osmania University	N/A	N/A
1969/70	Bombay University	Bangalore University	N/A	N/A
1970/71	Madras University	Bombay University	N/A	N/A
1971/72	Punjabi University	Udaipur University	N/A	N/A
1972/73	Madras University	Delhi University	N/A	N/A
1973/74	Delhi University	Bangalore University	N/A	N/A
1974/75	Bombay University	Delhi University	N/A	N/A
1975/76	Madras University	Bombay University	N/A	N/A
1976/77	Osmania University	Bombay University	N/A	N/A
1977/78	Delhi University	Osmania University	Calcutta University	Bombay University
1978/79	Delhi University	Bombay University	Madras University	Allahabad University
1979/80	Delhi University	Osmania University	Bangalore University	Guru Nanak Dev University
1980/81	Delhi University	Bombay University	Madras University	Calcutta University
1981/82	Delhi University	Guru Nanak Dev University	Madras University	Calcutta University
1982/83	Delhi University	Poona University	Patna University	Panjab University
1983/84	Delhi University	Panjab University	Poona University	Bangalore University
1984/85	Bombay University	Delhi University	Panjab University	Calcutta University
1985/86	Madras University	Bombay University	Delhi University	Aligarh Muslim University
1986/87	Bangalore University	Madras University	Panjab University	Calcutta University
1987/88	Delhi University	Bangalore University	Maharaja Sayajirao University	Poona University
1988/89	Guru Nanak Dev University	Delhi University	Bombay University	Rajasthan University
1989/90	Delhi University	Guru Nanak Dev University	Jamia Millia Islamia	Panjab University
1990/91	Jamia Millia Islamia	Poona University	Delhi University	Guru Nanak Dev University
1991/92	South Gujarat University	Guru Nanak Dev University	Gujarat University	Delhi University
1992/93	Delhi University	Bhavnagar University	Bangalore University	Kurukshetra University
1993/94	Guru Nanak Dev University	Bombay University	Lalit Narayan Mithila University	Karnatak University
1994/95	Panjab University	Ranchi University	?	?
1995/96	?	?	?	?
1996/97	Guru Nanak Dev University	?	?	?
1997/98	Guru Nanak Dev University	?	?	?
1998/99	Delhi University	Osmania University	?	?
1999/00	Madras University	Barkatullah University	?	?
2000/01	?	Delhi University	Madras University	Osmania University
2001/02	Maharaja Sayajirao University	Mumbai University	?	?
2002/03	Chaudhary Charan Singh University	Gujarat University	Bangalore University	Ranchi University
2003/04	?	?	?	?
2004/05	Calcutta University	Jamia Millia Islamia	Osmania University	Mysore University
2005/06	Mumbai University	?	?	?
2006/07	Madras University	Mysore University	Calcutta University	Saurashtra University
2007/08	Mumbai University	Madras University	SRM Institute of Science and Technology	Guru Nanak Dev University
2008/09	Mumbai University	SRM Institute of Science and Technology	Delhi University	Rashtrasant Tukadoji Maharaj Nagpur University
2009/10	Mumbai University	Punjabi University	Madras University	SRM Institute of Science and Technology
2010/11	Guru Nanak Dev University	Mumbai University	Osmania University	Madras University
2011/12	Guru Nanak Dev University	Banaras Hindu University	Mumbai University	Jain University
2012/13	Jain University	Mumbai University	Jamia Millia Islamia	Jiwaji University
2013/14	Guru Nanak Dev University	Maharshi Dayanand University	Mumbai University	Jain University
2014/15	Veer Bahadur Singh Purvanchal University	Delhi University	Mumbai University	SRM Institute of Science and Technology
2015/16	SRM Institute of Science and Technology	Mumbai University	Jain University	Aligarh Muslim University
2016/17	Veer Narmad South Gujarat University	Delhi University	Sant Gadge Baba Amravati University	Chaudhary Charan Singh University
2017/18	Maharishi Dayanand University	Saurashtra University	Guru Nanak Dev University	Mumbai University
2018/19	Guru Nanak Dev University	Mysore University	Mumbai University	Veer Bahadur Singh Purvanchal University
2019/20	Veer Bahadur Singh Purvanchal University	Rashtrasant Tukadoji Maharaj Nagpur University	Delhi University	Mysore University

Notes:-

- N/A means not applicable.
- Before the 1977/78 season no matches were held for 3rd and 4th positions.
- For some of the tournaments between 1994/95 and 2005/06 the finalists and winners are obscure.
- The Punjab University that competed before Partition is the University of the Punjab in Lahore, Pakistan, and the ones that have competed since Partition are the Panjab University, Chandigarh, and the Punjabi University, Patiala.

== See also ==
- Vizzy Trophy
