= Dilip Sardesai =

Indian cricketer (1940–2007)

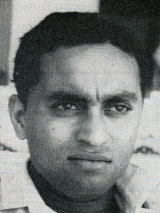

Personal information
- Full name: Dilip Narayan Sardesai
- Born: 8 August 1940; Margão, Goa, Portuguese India
- Died: 2 July 2007 (aged 66); Mumbai, Maharashtra, India
- Batting: Right-handed
- Bowling: Right-arm
- Relatives: Rajdeep Sardesai (son); Sagarika Ghose (daughter-in-law)

International information
- National side: India
- Test debut (cap 103): 1 December 1961 v England
- Last Test: 20 December 1972 v England

Domestic team information
- Years: Team
- 1961–1973: Bombay
- 1961–1965: Associated Cement Company

Career statistics
| Competition | Tests | First-class |
|---|---|---|
| Matches | 30 | 179 |
| Runs scored | 2,001 | 10,230 |
| Batting average | 39.23 | 41.75 |
| 100s/50s | 5/9 | 25/56 |
| Top score | 212 | 222 |
| Balls bowled | 59 | 791 |
| Wickets | 0 | 8 |
| Bowling average | – | 69.00 |
| 5 wickets in innings | – | 0 |
| 10 wickets in match | – | 0 |
| Best bowling | – | 2/15 |
| Catches/stumpings | 4/– | 85/– |
- Source: ESPNcricinfo

Dilip Narayan Sardesai (8 August 1940 – 2 July 2007) was an Indian international cricketer. He played Tests for the Indian national team as a batsman, the first Goa-born cricketer to play for India, and was often regarded as one of India's best batsmen against spin, although Indian batsmen have been known to play better against spin.

== Early life and career ==
Sardesai grew up in a Gaud Saraswat Brahmin family of Margão, a town in the erstwhile Portuguese India (in the present-day Indian State of Goa). He studied in the New Era high school there. The region had no cricketing infrastructure during his growing days in the early 1950s. His family moved to Bombay (now Mumbai) in 1957, when Sardesai was 17. He attended the city's Wilson College where his cricketing talent was spotted by coach 'Manya' Naik. He also studied at the Siddharth College of Arts, Science and Commerce in Fort, Mumbai.

Sardesai made his first mark in cricket in the inter-university Rohinton Baria Trophy in 1959–60 where he made 435 runs at an average of 87. He would later recall that he was called up for the trials for the Combined Universities team that was to play the touring Pakistan side in 1960–61. Impressed by his technique, Lala Amarnath, the chairman of selectors, drafted him into the team. Sardesai made the playing XI, thus making his first-class debut, against Pakistan in Pune in November 1960. Sardesai went on to make 87 in 194 minutes in his only innings of the match, while also taking Hanif Mohammad's catch with his fielding. In his next game, playing for Board President's XI against the same Pakistan side prior to the Fourth Test of the tour, he scored an unbeaten century (106 in 260 minutes), putting together a 134-run stand with Vijay Mehra for the third wicket.

== Test career ==
Sardesai had little to show in first class cricket in 1961–62, except for a 281 against Gujarat in a university match. He was included in the India team for the Second Test of England's India tour, in Kanpur, in December 1961. Leading up to the Test, he was described as an "aggressive strokeplayer". In his debut innings Sardesai made 28 before he was out hit wicket while trying to late-cut spinner Tony Lock through the vacant slip region to the third man boundary. His innings lasted 108 minutes. Sardesai toured the West Indies later in the season, playing in three of the five Tests. He was captain Nari Contractor's opening partner in a tour game against Barbados that saw the former hit on the head by a Charlie Griffith delivery after Sardesai had lost his wicket. Contractor's injury created a place for Sardesai in the Test team. He scored 31 and 60 in the Test at Bridgetown, opening the batting, but was dropped after he was dismissed for a pair in the following match. Sardesai scored 449 runs in the five Test series against England in 1963–64 with 79 and 87 in the Fifth and final Test as the most notable performances, helping India to secure a draw after being made to follow on.

Against New Zealand in 1964–65, Sardesai scored a double century at Bombay and a very fast hundred that set up a win at Delhi. New Zealand had forced India to follow on at Bombay, but Sardesai's unbeaten double-century nearly won the match for India. He played against West Indies in 1966–67, and then toured England in 1967, where he injured himself on a staircase in the pavilion at Lord's and missed the First Test at Headingley. He recovered to appear in the Second Test back at Lord's, but a broken finger sustained during that match ended his tour. He was dropped after two Tests in Australia in 1967–68 due to injury and a series of failures.

Sardesai's career had seemed over until he was picked for the Indian tour of West Indies in 1970–71. In the First Test at Kingston, India lost the first five wickets for 75, before Sardesai hit 212 runs and took the total to 387. His 112 in the next Test at Port of Spain led to India's first victory over West Indies. This innings made him the first Indian to score a double century outside India. He hit another 150 in the Fourth Test after India were 70 for 6. His 642 runs in the series stood as an Indian record for five days before Sunil Gavaskar went past it. It was India's first victory over West Indies in a series and Vijay Merchant, the chairman of selectors, called Sardesai the "renaissance man of Indian cricket". Sardesai scored 54 and 40 in the Indian win over England at the Oval in 1971, which led to another series win. His career ended one Test later, and he retired from all cricket at the end of the 1972–73 season.

Sardesai played for Bombay in the Ranji Trophy in 13 seasons, between 1961 and 1973, including 10 finals, and never finished on the losing side. He scored 199 against Rajasthan in the 1967 final. In the semi-final against the same team two years later, he was Mankaded by Kailash Gattani. Sardesai's final first-class match was the famous Ranji Trophy final against Madras in 1972–73, which ended on the first ball of the third day. Sardesai scored over 1,000 first-class runs in three domestic seasons, with a career best of 1,429 runs in 1964–65, which included his highest first-class score of 222, for Associated Cement Company against Indian Starlets in the final of the Moin-ud-Dowlah Gold Cup Tournament.

== Personal life and post retirement ==
Sardesai first met Nandini Pant (born c. 1945) in Mumbai's Berry's restaurant when she was holidaying in the city after her exams. Sardesai was a university cricketer during the time. The two kept in touch during the latter's tour of the Caribbean with Indian team in 1961–62, before marrying a couple of years later. Pant worked as a sociology professor for 35 years and later as member of the Central Board of Film Certification till 2015. She is currently a visiting faculty in some of Mumbai's leading colleges. Sardesai's cousin Sopandev was also a cricketer, who played as a wicket-keeper in the first-class level for Rajputana. The Sardesais had three children together: son Rajdeep, and two daughters. Rajdeep is a television journalist and former cricketer. As a cricketer, he earned an Oxford University blue, before beginning a career in journalism. He was the editor-in-chief of IBN18 Network prior to his resignation in 2014; his wife Sagarika Ghose is also a journalist. One of Dilip's daughters, Shonali, is a senior social scientist with the World Bank in Washington, D.C.

After retirement from cricket, Sardesai would split his time between his residences in Mumbai and Goa. In June 2007, he was admitted to a hospital in Mumbai for a chest infection. Suffering from kidney ailment during the time, he was on dialysis. He died on 2 July from multiple organ failure. The last rites were performed by Rajdeep at Mumbai's Chandanwadi crematorium the following day.

Sardesai was popularly known as 'Sardee-Singh'. During his successful 1970–71 tour there, Sardesai was asked at the airport whether he had anything to declare. 'I have come here with runs', he replied, 'and I'll go back with more'. On 8 August 2018, search engine Google commemorated Sardesai with a Doodle on his 78th birth anniversary.

The Directorate of Sports and Youth Affairs, Government of Goa, instituted the Dilip Sardesai Sports Excellence Award in 2009, which is given on the occasion of National Sports Day (29 August) each year. The award consists of a bronze plaque of Sardesai, a citation and a purse of ₹200,000. It is presented to achievers among Goan sportspersons who represented India at any international-level sports competition during the preceding year.

== Test Hundreds ==
Double Centuries

- 212 v West Indies at Sabina Park, Kingston, 18–23 Feb 1971
- 200* v New Zealand at Mumbai, Mumbai, 12–15 Mar 1965

Centuries

- 150 v West Indies at Kensington Oval, Bridgetown, 1–6 Apr 1971
- 112 v West Indies at Queen's Park Oval, Port of Spain, 6–10 Mar 1971
- 106 v New Zealand at Feroz Shah Kotla Ground, Delhi, 19–22 Mar 1965
