= Laxman Londhe =

Laxman Londhe (13 October 1944 - 6 Aug 2015) was a noted novelist and science fiction author in Marathi. He was part of the modern Marathi literary movement to popularize science in the late 1970s, with a group of authors rising to prominence, including Bal Phondke, Niranjan Ghate, Jayant Narlikar, and several others.

== Works ==
Londhe was the author of numerous volumes of science fiction such as dusrA einstein (दुसरा आइनस्टाइन, second Einstein), remote control, dura kShitijAplIkaDe (दूर : क्षितिजापलीकडे, Distant Horizon). He also wrote numerous commentaries on social affairs, which often have titles with his name - e.g. lakShmaNa uvAcha (लक्ष्मण उवाच, Thus spake lakShmaNa), lakShmaNAyana ( लक्ष्मणायन), etc. He also wrote a few novels, e.g. SangharSha, (conflict). Along with Chintamani Deshmukh, he is the author of the acclaimed novel devAnsI jIve mArile (देवांसी जीवे मारिले).

He had also converted several of his stories into plays, and TV episodes. Many of his stories have been acclaimed in translation, including the title story from Second Einstein, which has been anthologized in several collections including James Gunn's The Road to Science Fiction 6: Around the World, (1989) and J. Narlikar's _It Happened Tomorrow_ (1993). The story tells of an eminent scientist who is dying of lung cancer before he can finish an important theory, and how his brain is preserved by doctors at AIIMS.

== Awards ==
Londhe was awarded the Maharashtra government UtkriShTa sAhitya nirmiti purashkAr. In 2005, he was conferred the Vidharbha Sahitya Sangh literary award.
