= Syed Hasan =

Syed Hasan or Hassan may refer to:

- Syed Hasan (writer) (1908–1988), Indian writer and scholar
- Syed Ainul Hasan (born 1957), Indian academic and university administrator
- Syed Ali Hasan (before 1902–1962), Indian cricketer and police official
- Syed Arif Hasan (born 1950), Pakistani sports administrator and retired general
- Syed Hamidul Hasan, Indian ayatollah
- Syed Mir Hassan (1844–1929), Indian scholar of the Qur'an, Hadith, Sufism, and Arabic
- Syed Munawar Hasan (1941–2020), Pakistani politician
- Syed Shamsul Hasan (1882–1981), Pakistani politician
- Syed Sumail Hassan (born 1999), known as Sumail, Pakistani eSports player
- Syed Wazir Hasan (1874–1947), Indian jurist and politician
- Syed Zafarul Hasan (1885–1949), Pakistani philosopher
