= Retrievers cricket team =

The Retrievers were a first-class cricket team of British India that took part in the Moin-ud-Dowlah Gold Cup Tournament in 1934–35, playing two matches.

After the Maharajkumar of Vizianagram's team the Freelooters won the Moin-ud-Dowlah Gold Cup Tournament in 1931-32 and 1932–33, his cricket-promoting rival the Maharaja of Patiala established his own team, the Retrievers, for the next tournament in 1934–35.

Captained by the Maharaja's son the Yuvraj of Patiala and consisting of 10 Indian Test players along with the Australian leg-spinner Frank Warne, the Retrievers dominated their semi-final against Hyderabad Cricket Association XI, and met the Freelooters in the final. Thanks to a century by Lala Amarnath and the bowling of Mohammad Nissar (eight wickets) and C. K. Nayudu (seven wickets), they won by three wickets. Neither Retrievers nor Freelooters played again.
