= R. K. Mody's XI =

R. K. Mody's XI were an Indian first-class cricket team, sponsored by the Indian business firm R.K. Mody and Company Limited, that competed in the Moin-ud-Dowlah Gold Cup Tournament from 1968-69 to 1971-72, playing four matches. They won the tournament in 1969-70.

== Matches ==
Their first match, against Hyderabad Blues in 1968-69, was abandoned without a ball bowled owing to rain. On the basis of a coin-toss, Hyderabad Blues progressed to the semi-finals.

In the 1969-70 semi-final R. K. Mody's XI made 354, Sudhir Naik scoring 101, and dismissed Vazir Sultan Tobacco Colts XI for 125 and 135, Anand Shukla taking 8 for 50 and 3 for 61. In the final, Hyderabad Cricket Association XI made 275 and 206, and R. K. Mody's XI responded with 208 and 274 for five to win by five wickets. Shukla took six wickets and made 64 not out and 21 not out.

In the 1970-71 semi-final R. K. Mody's XI made 146 and 223 (Robin Mukherjee 123) to lose to State Bank of India, 385, by an innings.

In 1971-72, in a rain-affected quarter-final, R. K. Mody's XI were dismissed for 77, and had their opponents, Vazir Sultan Tobacco XI, 72 for 9 in search of the first-innings lead that would have decided the match, but a tenth-wicket partnership of eight was enough to take Vazir Sultan Tobacco XI into the semi-finals. Anand Shukla had figures of 10–6–9–5.

== Leading players ==
Anand Shukla played in all four matches and took 22 wickets at an average of 17.09. Robin Mukherjee was the highest scorer, with 294 runs in three matches at 58.80. The captain in the first three matches was Prakash Bhandari, and in the last match, Ramesh Saxena.
