= Fasihuddin =

Personal information
- Full name: Syed Fasihuddin
- Born: 18 September 1938 (age 88); Delhi, British India
- Batting: Right-handed
- Role: Wicket-keeper

Domestic team information
- Years: Team
- 1957–58 to 1959–60, 1961–62: Karachi
- 1960–61, 1962–63 to 1974–75: Quetta
- 1972–73 to 1973–74: Baluchistan

Career statistics
Competition	First-class
Matches	51
Runs scored	2286
Batting average	29.30
100s/50s	6/8
Top score	237
Catches/stumpings	80/36
- Source: ESPNcricinfo, 2 January 2014

Syed Fasihuddin (born 18 September 1938) is a former Pakistani cricketer who played first-class cricket for several teams in Pakistan between 1957–58 and 1974–75. He toured England in 1967 but did not play Test cricket.

== Career with Karachi ==
A wicket-keeper who usually opened the batting, Fasihuddin made his first-class debut for Karachi B in 1957–58. Playing for Karachi University against Punjab University in the final of the first-class Inter-Universities Championship in 1958–59, he batted for 607 minutes to score 195 and help his team to an innings victory. A few weeks later he kept wicket and opened the batting for a President's XI against the visiting West Indians. He was in the Karachi team that won the Quaid-e-Azam Trophy in 1959–60, and in the combined Railways team and Quetta team that won the Ayub Trophy in 1960–61.

He hit 147 for the Pakistan Eaglets against the visiting Associated Cement Company team from India at the start of the 1961–62 season, and played two matches against the touring MCC, for a President's XI in Rawalpindi and for a Combined XI in Bahawalpur later in the season. He also played for an East Pakistan Governor's XI against a touring International XI in Dacca. In 10 matches that season he scored 371 runs at 26.50 and took 19 catches and nine stumpings.

== Career with Quetta ==
After playing for Karachi in 1961–62, Fasihuddin returned to Quetta in 1962–63. In only four matches that season he made 471 runs at 67.28, including 55 and 147 against Karachi A and 237 in his next innings a few days later in an innings victory over East Pakistan, which enabled Quetta to progress to a quarter-final of the Quaid-e-Azam Trophy for the first time. His 237 remains the highest score ever made for Quetta.

He captained Quetta from 1963–64 to 1972–73. In his first match as captain he made 107 in a drawn match against Hyderabad. Again Quetta made the quarter-finals. He also played for a Punjab Governor's XI against the touring Commonwealth XI in 1963–64.

Fasihuddin toured England in 1967 as reserve wicket-keeper to the 19-year-old Wasim Bari, playing in six of the 17 first-class matches. He batted in the lower order, and made only 63 runs at an average of 9.00.

Captaining Quetta against Kalat in 1969–70, Fasihuddin opened the batting and scored 111 and took three catches and three stumpings in an innings victory. While playing for Quetta in the Patron's Trophy, he also played two matches for Baluchistan in the Quaid-e-Azam Trophy in 1972–73 (as captain) and 1973–74. In his 18 matches for Quetta he scored 1242 runs at 42.40, with four centuries, and took 29 catches and 17 stumpings.

His younger brother Salahuddin (not to be confused with the Test player Salahuddin who also toured England in 1967) played first-class cricket in Pakistan in the 1960s. The brothers played together in several matches for Quetta.
