= Castle Park Cricket Ground =

Cricket ground in Colchester, England

- Interactive map of Castle Park Cricket Ground

Ground information
- Location: Colchester, Essex
- Country: England
- Coordinates: 51.895°N 0.903°E
- Establishment: 1908

Team information
Essex County Cricket Club	(1914–2016)
Colchester & East Essex
- As of 27 May 2008; Source: CricInfo

Castle Park Cricket Ground is an English cricket ground in Castle Park, Colchester. The ground is in Lower Castle Park, part of the land surrounding Colchester Castle and within the area of the Historic England Grade II registered park and garden. It was used by Essex County Cricket Club for some of their first-class cricket matches between 1914 and 2016. When the ground is not used to stage First-class cricket matches, it is frequently used for Colchester & East Essex Cricket Club.

== History ==
The ground was opened in 1908 and the first match played here was on 18 June 1914 between Essex and Worcestershire in the County Championship. The ground is bordered by the remains of a Roman Wall.

Due to the River Colne running alongside the ground, there used to be regular problems of drainage. In 1966, a match in progress was moved to Colchester's secondary venue, the Garrison A Cricket Ground. Matches returned to the ground in 1974 when a John Player League match was played and Essex played on the ground annually until 2016. Since 2017 matches at the ground have been "suspended" as a result of changes to the ways in which fixtures are arranged by the England and Wales Cricket Board.

Irish pop vocal band Westlife were to perform at the ground on 11 July 2020 for their "Stadiums in the Summer Tour".

== Notable Matches ==
During a county championship match between Essex and Kent at the ground in 1938, Arthur Fagg became the first (and still only) batsman, to hit a double century in each innings, scoring 244 in his first and 202 not out in his second.

Ken McEwan, always a prolific scorer, hit five hundreds in four consecutive visits to Castle Park between 1981 and 1984. He surpassed himself in 1983, scoring 181 against Gloucestershire and then, in the same week, 189 against Worcestershire, on both occasions securing a comfortable victory for Essex.

In 1981, after Glamorgan had secured a first innings lead, a century each from Graham Gooch and Brian Hardie allowed Essex to declare their second innings at 411 for 9. Undeterred at being set 325 runs in as many minutes, Javed Miandad scored 200 and it was only when he ran out of partners, some 14 runs short of the required total, that Essex and a nervous crowd of supporters could breathe freely again.

== Ground records ==
- Highest Team Total - Essex, 662/7 declared, 1995
- Lowest Team Total - Essex, 44, 1986
- Highest Individual Total - A.E. Fagg 244, 1938
- Best Bowling Figures - T.P.B. Smith 9/77, 1947
