= Murtuza Baig =

Indian cricketer

Personal information
- Full name: Murtuza Ali Baig
- Born: 8 November 1941; Hyderabad, British Raj (now India)
- Died: 17 July 2015 (aged 73); Banjara Hills, Hyderabad, India
- Batting: Right-handed
- Bowling: Right-arm off-spin
- Relatives: Abbas Ali Baig (brother); Mazhar Ali Baig (brother)

Domestic team information
- Years: Team
- 1958-59 to 1970-71: Hyderabad
- 1961 to 1964: Oxford University

Career statistics
Competition	First-class
Matches	48
Runs scored	1898
Batting average	27.50
100s/50s	1/10
Top score	103
Balls bowled	474
Wickets	6
Bowling average	49.83
5 wickets in innings	–
10 wickets in match	–
Best bowling	4/44
Catches/stumpings	13/–
- Source: CricketArchive, 16 May 2014

Murtuza Ali Baig (8 November 1941 – 17 July 2015) was a first-class cricketer who played for Hyderabad and Oxford University between 1958 and 1971.

== Career ==
Baig made his first-class debut for Hyderabad in the Ranji Trophy in 1958-59 as a middle-order batsman. He played once in that season, and three times in 1959–60, but with little success.

After attending Osmania University in Hyderabad he went to New College, Oxford. Between 1961 and 1964 he played 28 times for Oxford University, scoring 1349 runs at an average of 27.53. His highest score was 103 against Derbyshire in 1962. He played three times in the annual match against Cambridge University; in 1962 his brother Abbas was also in the team, and they shared a partnership of 72 for the second wicket after Oxford had lost their first wicket to the first ball of the innings.

He returned to India and played irregularly for Hyderabad between 1965–66 and 1970–71. His highest score for Hyderabad was 83 (retired hurt) against Andhra in 1966–67.

He lived in Banjara Hills in Hyderabad with his wife Dilnaz. He died at home in July 2015.
