= National Sports Council of Assam Ground =

Cricket ground in Jorhat, Assam, India

- Full name: National Sports Council of Assam Ground
- Former names: National Sports Council of Assam Stadium
- Location: Jorhat, Assam
- Owner: National Sports Council of Assam
- Operator: National Sports Council of Assam
- Capacity: 5,000

Construction
- Groundbreaking: 1953
- Opened: 1953

Website
- ESPNcricinfo

The National Sports Council of Assam Ground, also known as the National Sports Council of Assam Stadium, is a former first-class cricket ground in Jorhat, Assam.

== First-class matches ==
Ten first-class matches were played at the ground between 1953 and 1974, eight of them by Assam in the Ranji Trophy. In all ten matches the home team lost. There were many low innings totals and some notable bowling figures.

=== 1953–54 ===
- Commonwealth XI 393 for 7 declared defeated Assam Governor's XI 121 and 151.

Paul Gibb made 154, which remained the highest score on the ground. He and Ken Meuleman (79) put on 211 for the first wicket.

=== 1954–55 ===
- Bihar 81 and 107 defeated Assam 53 and 89.

S.K. Girdhari took six wickets in each innings for Assam and Bimal Bose took six in each innings for Bihar. Bose's 12 for 47 remained the best match figures on the ground; Girdhari took 12 for 66. Girdhari also top-scored for Assam in each innings, with 14 and 46.

=== 1956–57 ===
- Bengal 505 defeated Assam 54 and 245.

Premangsu Chatterjee took 10 for 20 for Bengal in the first innings, which remain the best first-class figures ever taken outside England and Wales. Dattu Phadkar took 7 for 65 in Assam's second innings. For Assam, S.K. Girdhari took 7 for 157, Assam's best figures on the ground, and made 100, Assam's only century on the ground.

=== 1958–59 ===
- Bengal 164 and 151 for 6 declared defeated Assam 68 and 60.

In his first first-class match, Jyoti Dutta took 7 for 18 and 3 for 21 for Bengal.

- East Zone 106 and 39 lost to West Indians 162.

For the West Indians, Wes Hall took 7 for 54 in the first innings, Eric Atkinson 6 for 10 in the second.

=== 1966–67 ===
- Assam 53 and 148 lost to Bengal 346 for 8 declared.

Jiban Ghosh took 7 for 15 in Assam's first innings. Pankaj Roy made 140 for Bengal.

- Assam 86 and 125 lost to Bihar 261.

Anand Shukla took 5 for 14 and 5 for 36.

- The match scheduled for the ground between Orissa and Assam could not be played as Orissa were unable to get to Jorhat.

=== 1974–75 ===
- Orissa 150 and 140 for 7 declared defeated Assam 62 and 111.
- Bihar 155 and 308 defeated Assam 56 and 88.

Anand Shukla took 5 for 15 and 2 for 26, giving him 17 for 91 in two matches on the ground.

- Bengal 350 for 6 declared defeated Assam 35 and 33.

Ambar Roy made 126. Dilip Doshi took 6 for 6 in Assam's first innings; Aloke Bhattacharjee took 7 for 7 in the second innings, for match figures of 12.2–6–11–10. For Assam, Nandan Bezbarua top-scored in each innings with 11 and 8 not out; he carried his bat in the second innings.

=== Statistics ===
In the eight Ranji Trophy matches, Assam scored 1366 runs for the loss of 159 wickets, at an average of 8.59 runs per wicket. Assam's opponents scored 2718 runs for 106 wickets at an average of 25.64.

== The ground ==
Sujit Mukherjee, who was in the Bihar squad in December 1954 but did not play in the match, described the ground:

The cricket ground was a winsomely green oval surrounded by grass banks and large leafy trees. Because of the trees, playing hours were set between nine-thirty and four-thirty, otherwise long shadows overcast the wicket. Until nearly nine in the morning the ground would be shrouded in mist; then it suddenly dispersed and the arena was bathed in sunlight like the stage of an amphitheatre.

== Assam home grounds ==
Assam had previously played a Ranji Trophy match in Jorhat in 1949–50 on the Conamara Ground. Since 1974–75 no first-class matches have been held in Jorhat, although a number of other centres in the state have hosted matches from time to time. Most of Assam's games are now staged in the state's largest city, Guwahati.
