= Bimal Bose =

Indian cricketer (1918–1996)

Personal information
- Full name: Bimal Krishna Bose
- Born: 16 June 1918; Calcutta, British India
- Died: 20 May 1996 (aged 77); Jamshedpur, Bihar, India
- Batting: Left-handed
- Bowling: Left-arm medium

Domestic team information
- Years: Team
- 1940-41 to 1963-64: Bihar
- 1949-50 to 1960-61: East Zone

Career statistics
| Competition | First-class |
|---|---|
| Matches | 45 |
| Runs scored | 619 |
| Batting average | 12.38 |
| 100s/50s | 0/3 |
| Top score | 66 |
| Balls bowled | 9466 |
| Wickets | 209 |
| Bowling average | 18.26 |
| 5 wickets in innings | 15 |
| 10 wickets in match | 6 |
| Best bowling | 8/43 |
| Catches/stumpings | 14/– |
- Source: CricketArchive, 11 January 2015

Bimal Krishna Bose (16 June 1918 – 20 May 1996) was an Indian cricketer who played first-class cricket for Bihar from 1940 to 1963, captaining the team from 1953–54 to 1957–58. His elder brother was famous revolutionary Benoy Basu.

== Early career ==
Bimal Bose made his first-class debut for Bihar in the 1940–41 season as a left-arm medium-paced opening bowler, and was seldom out of the team for the next 23 seasons. He batted low in the order, and made his highest score of 66 against Bengal in his second match. Bihar needed 264 to take the first-innings lead, which in a drawn match, as this one seemed likely to be, effectively counted as a victory. Bose went in at 149 for seven, and was last man out, caught on the boundary going for the six that would have taken Bihar into the lead.

In the 1948-49 Ranji Trophy match against Delhi he took 7 for 42 in the first innings, then when Delhi needed only 78 in the second innings to win he and his captain Shute Banerjee dismissed them in 21 overs for 48, Bose taking 4 for 25.

== Captain of Bihar ==
In his first match as captain in 1953–54 Bose took 3 for 71 and 6 for 65 in a drawn match against Bengal. In his next match, in 1954–55, he led Bihar to victory over Assam, taking 6 for 16 and 6 for 31 at Jorhat.

In the 1957–58 season he took 8 for 43 (the other two batsmen were run out) and 2 for 36 against Assam in an innings victory, 4 for 32 and 7 for 31, bowling unchanged through both innings, in another innings victory over Orissa, and 5 for 87 off 46 overs in an innings loss to Bengal. His 8 for 43 remained the best-ever innings figures for Bihar; his overall record of 205 Ranji Trophy wickets is also the highest for Bihar. He took 26 wickets at an average of 8.80 in that season.

== Later career ==
Bose's most successful season came two seasons later in 1959–60, when at the age of 41 he took 34 wickets at 14.29 in four matches. He began with 5 for 42 and 3 for 11 against Assam, then took 6 for 42 and 5 for 137 to give Bihar their first-ever victory over Bengal at the twenty-third attempt, and take Bihar into the Ranji Trophy semi-finals for the first time. They lost to Mysore in the semi-final on Bihar's home ground, Keenan Stadium in Jamshedpur, but Bose took 6 for 78 and 6 for 95, bowling 51 overs out of 108 in the second innings. He played his last match in 1963–64.

His other two brothers Bikash and Biraj also played for Bihar in the 1950s. All three played in Bihar's two matches in 1950–51.
