= Pakistan Eaglets =

Cricket team

Pakistan Eaglets were a team of young cricketers from Pakistan, founded by Justice A.R. Cornelius. They toured England and Wales every year from 1952 to 1959, Malaya and Ceylon in 1960–61, and England again in 1963. Most of their matches were non-first-class, but they played 11 first-class matches between 1960 and 1963. Many Pakistan Eaglets players went on to play Test cricket for Pakistan.

== Tours to England and Wales, 1952 to 1959 ==
These tours usually lasted a few weeks in the warmer months of July and August and included matches against club sides, minor county sides, and county second elevens. More than half of the matches were in either Wales or the west of England. None of the matches were first-class.

In both 1958 and 1959, the Eaglets played Rutland at the Lime Kilns Ground in Oakham. The 1958 match was drawn, and the Eaglets won in 1959 by 78 runs. The Eaglets are the only overseas team that has played against Rutland.

== First first-class match ==
Pakistan Eaglets played a three-day first-class match in Lahore in May 1960 against the touring Indian Starlets side, a team of young Indian cricketers. In the drawn match, Ijaz Butt was the Eaglets' top scorer with 161.

== Tour to Malaya, Singapore and Ceylon, 1960-61 ==
From late August to late September 1960 the Pakistan Eaglets played four matches in Malaya, three in Singapore, and four in Ceylon. The tour ended with a first-class match against the Ceylon Cricket Association in Colombo, a slow, low-scoring affair that ended in a draw. Ijaz Butt top-scored in each innings with 54 and 67, and Fazal-ur-Rehman took 5 for 61 in the first innings.

== Third first-class match ==
In 1961-62 a team from India representing the Associated Cement Company played three first-class matches in Pakistan. The match against the Pakistan Eaglets in Lahore was drawn with the Eaglets seven wickets down for 101 in pursuit of a target of 130 for victory. Iqbal Sheikh took 7 for 46 and 5 for 120 with his off-spin, and the wicket-keeper Fasihuddin made 147.

== Tour to England, 1963 ==
Pakistan Eaglets, sponsored by Pakistan International Airlines, played 20 matches on their 1963 tour of England and Wales. They were captained by the experienced Test player Wazir Mohammad. In their eight first-class matches they had innings victories over Cambridge University and Kent, lost to Worcestershire and Derbyshire, and drew the other four.

Faqir Aizazuddin made the highest first-class score, 187 against Cambridge University, and Mushtaq Mohammad hit two centuries and made most runs, 593 at an average of 53.90. Mohammad Munaf had the best bowling figures of 8 for 84 against Kent, but the highest overall wicket tally was shared by Asif Iqbal, 19 at 14.73, and Intikhab Alam, 19 at 23.15. Of the 18 players on the tour, 14 played Test cricket. Four (Intikhab Alam, Majid Khan, Asif Iqbal and Mushtaq Mohammad) went on to captain the Test team.
