= Rakesh Shukla (cricketer) =

Indian cricketer (1948–2019)

Personal information
- Full name: Rakesh Chandra Shukla
- Born: 4 February 1948; Kanpur, United Provinces, India
- Died: 29 June 2019 (aged 71); Delhi, India
- Batting: Right-handed
- Bowling: Legbreak googly
- Relatives: Anand Shukla (brother)

International information
- National side: India
- Only Test (cap 160): 17 September 1982 v Sri Lanka

Career statistics
Competition	Test	First-class	LA
Matches	1	121	23
Runs scored	–	3,798	333
Batting average	–	31.91	23.78
100s/50s	–	6/17	0/0
Top score	–	163*	40
Balls bowled	294	16,846	697
Wickets	2	295	14
Bowling average	76.00	24.53	35.78
5 wickets in innings	0	7	0
10 wickets in match	0	1	0
Best bowling	2/82	7/83	3/25
Catches/stumpings	0/–	71/–	1/–
- Source: Cricinfo, 20 May 2022

Rakesh Chandra Shukla (4 February 1948 – 29 June 2019) was an Indian cricketer.

== Career ==
Shukla's cricket career included a modest debut and several notable performances. He was a leg-spin bowler who frequently used the googly rather than relying solely on conventional deliveries. On pitches that offered assistance to spin bowling, he could generate turn and direct the ball past the off stump..

Born in Kanpur, Shukla was seven years younger than his brother Anand Shukla, another leg-break bowler and handy batsman who played domestic cricket for a long time. A study of the careers of the two brothers will reveal how close their records have been. Anand's numbers are better, but that has a lot to do with the fact that he played for Uttar Pradesh and Bihar, which were in the weaker zones of the Ranji Trophy.

Shukla played for Hartlepool Cricket Club in the North Yorkshire and South Durham Cricket League. He took 61 wickets and scored over 1,300 runs in 1982 to help the club win the league. While still in England, he was selected in the Indian Test team to play against Sri Lanka in Madras. Shukla went wicketless in the first innings. In the second he dismissed the two highest scorers - Roy Dias (97) edged to Sunil Gavaskar at slip after misreading a googly, and Duleep Mendis (105) was bowled.

After he quit cricket Shukla became a cricket consultant, providing coaching and guidance to young players and professionals. He was a member of the Delhi Selection Committee headed by Chetan Chauhan. He was also a popular commentator on All India Radio.
