= U-Foam cricket team =

Indian cricket team

U-Foam were an Indian first-class cricket team, sponsored by the Indian polyurethane foam manufacturer U-Foam, that competed in the Moin-ud-Dowlah Gold Cup Tournament in 1972–73 and 1973–74. Captained by M. L. Jaisimha, they finished runners-up in the tournament each time, playing five matches in all, losing one and drawing the other four.

== 1972-73 ==
Apart from Jaisimha, the team included the Test players Sunil Gavaskar, E. A. S. Prasanna, Bhagwat Chandrasekhar, Kumar Indrajitsinhji and Mohinder Amarnath, and they dominated their first two matches, progressing through to the final on the basis of their first-innings lead in each match. Their only century and best bowling figures came in their first match, against A.N. Ghosh's XI: 101 by Patamada Belliappa and 7 for 79 by Chandrasekhar. In the final State Bank of India, who had won five of the six preceding tournaments, beat U-Foam by eight wickets, Bishan Bedi taking 11 wickets. Chandrasekhar was the leading wicket-taker in the tournament, with 16 at an average of 16.87, and Belliappa was the leading run-scorer, with 252 at 63.00.

== 1973-74 ==
U-Foam gained a 23-run first-innings lead over Birhan Maharashtra Sugar Syndicate in the semi-final in 1973–74 and played State Bank of India again in the final. State Bank of India gained a 97-run first-innings lead in the drawn match, thereby winning the tournament.

== Non-first-class matches ==
U-Foam continued to play for some seasons in the Moin-ud-Dowlah Gold Cup Tournament after the tournament lost its first-class status after the 1973–74 season. Still captained by Jaisimha, they won the tournament in 1976–77 and 1977–78.
