= Associated Cement Company cricket team =

Indian cricket team

Associated Cement Company were an Indian first-class cricket team, sponsored by the Associated Cement Company, that competed in the Moin-ud-Dowlah Gold Cup Tournament and played other first-class matches between 1961 and 1971.

== Tour of Pakistan, 1961-62 ==
Under the captaincy of the former Test player Madhav Mantri, who had just turned 40 and had not played regular first-class cricket since 1956–57, Associated Cement Company toured Pakistan in September 1961, playing three first-class matches. Ebrahim Maka and Rusi Modi were two other members of the team whose Test careers had finished in the early 1950s. In contrast, Dilip Sardesai played his first Test a few weeks after the tour, and five members of the team made their first-class debuts in the match in Lahore against Pakistan Eaglets.

Mantri made the team's top score of the tour with 73 in the second innings against Pakistan Eaglets after the team had trailed on the first innings by 183 runs. Needing 130 to win, Pakistan Eaglets finished on 101 for 7, Bal Kadbet taking 4 for 29 on his first-class debut. Imtiaz Ahmed's XI won the next match by 54 runs, although Sardesai made 68 and 34, top-scoring in each innings, and Polly Umrigar took 5 for 58 and 7 for 32. Umrigar also took five wickets in an innings in the last match, against Pakistan International Airlines, but Associated Cement Company lost by an innings.

== Moin-ud-Dowlah Gold Cup Tournament, 1962-63 to 1971-72 ==
Associated Cement Company were more successful in the Moin-ud-Dowlah Gold Cup Tournament. They won in the first season of the tournament's revival in 1962–63, finished second in 1963–64, then won again in 1964–65.

Fielding nine players who had made the tour to Pakistan, and captained again by Mantri, they had the better of their two drawn matches in the 1962-63 tournament. In the final against M.A. Chidambaram's XI, Umrigar made 60 and 104 and took three wickets, and Bapu Nadkarni made 98 and 77 and took six wickets. Their first-innings lead won them the trophy. Later that season, in a friendly match in aid of the national Defence Fund, Associated Cement Company had their first outright victory, over the Andhra Chief Minister's XI.

Nadkarni took over the captaincy in 1963–64. Associated Cement Company won their semi-final against Hyderabad Cricket Association XI by an innings, but lost the low-scoring final by five wickets. In 1964–65, they again won their semi-final, then overwhelmed the Indian Starlets in the final when Sardesai scored 222 and Umrigar 128, putting on 297 for the fourth wicket.

State Bank of India took a five-run first-innings lead in a drawn semi-final to knock Associated Cement Company out of the 1965-66 tournament. Associated Cement Company's last appearances were in the 1971-72 tournament, when captained by Vijay Bhosle they were unable to match State Bank of India's first innings of 500 for 7 declared in the final. Bhosle top-scored with 91.

== Overall record ==
In all, Associated Cement Company played 13 first-class matches, winning three, losing three, and drawing seven.

== Leading players ==
The three leading players were Nadkarni (12 matches, 702 runs at 39.00, 51 wickets at 16.05), Umrigar (11 matches, 798 runs at 44.33, 40 wickets at 18.65) and Sardesai (9 matches, 734 runs at 45.87). Several players played their entire first-class careers with Associated Cement Company, among whom Bal Kadbet (11 matches, 20 wickets at 32.30) played the most matches. Vishwanath Bondre was the only player to appear in all 13 matches.

== Other matches ==
Associated Cement Company are one of the teams that have taken part in the Times of India Challenge Shield, an annual sub-first-class cricket tournament contested in Mumbai by company teams since 1931. Associated Cement Company won the Shield five times between 1952 and 1961.
