= Raja Mukherjee =

Indian cricketer (1951–2022)

Personal information
- Born: 17 May 1951; Calcutta, West Bengal, India
- Died: 18 July 2022 (aged 71); Kolkata, West Bengal, India
- Batting: Right-handed
- Role: Batsman

Domestic team information
- Years: Team
- 1967/68–1978/79: Bengal

Career statistics
Competition	FC	LA
Matches	34	3
Runs scored	1,526	19
Batting average	33.17	9.50
100s/50s	4/5	0/0
Top score	154*	10
Balls bowled	18	9
Wickets	0	0
Bowling average	–	–
5 wickets in innings	–	–
10 wickets in match	–	–
Best bowling	–/–	–
Catches/stumpings	18/–	0/–
- Source: ESPNcricinfo, 18 July 2022

Raja Mukherjee (17 May 1951 – 18 July 2022) was an Indian cricketer. He played 34 first-class matches for Bengal between 1967 and 1979. His highest score was 154 not out against Orissa.

He was not related to Robin Mukherjee, who also played for Bengal in the late 1960s. They opened the batting together in 1967–68, making 112 for the first wicket in their first partnership.
