= Vishwanath Bondre =

Indian cricketer (1936–2014)

Personal information
- Born: 25 November 1936; Bombay, India
- Died: 8 January 2014 (aged 77); Mumbai, India
- Source: ESPNcricinfo, 17 May 2016

Vishwanath Bondre (25 November 1936 – 8 January 2014) was an Indian cricketer. He played 28 first-class matches for Mumbai and Associated Cement Company between 1961 and 1972.
