= Cricket Club, Aligarh Muslim University =

Indian cricket club

Personnel
- Captain: Tahmeed Ahmad
- Coach: Faisal M. R. K. Sherwani

Team information
- Founded: 1878; 147 years ago
- Home ground: Willingdon Cricket Ground, Aligarh
- Capacity: 2000

History
- First-class debut: vs Marylebone Cricket Club in 1927 at Willingdon Cricket Ground, Aligarh
- Rohinton Baria Trophy wins: 0
- University Cricket Championship wins: 0
- North Zone Inter-Varsity Cricket (Men's) Tournament wins: ??
- Official website: Official website

Cricket Club, Aligarh Muslim University (formerly, MAO Cricket Club) was established in the year 1878 at Aligarh.

== Club history ==
Cricket at Aligarh Muslim University started in 1878 when the mathematics professor, Rama Shankar Mishra, founded a cricket club, whose members were expected to wear a uniform of blue flannel coat, shirt, knickerbockers and cap. The club didn't at first thrive. It was not till Theodore Beck arrived in 1883 that real interest in cricket and sports began.

The club toured Simla, Patiala and Bombay and performed very well. In 1884 Theodore Beck took the club on a tour round the Punjab including a match against Government College, Lahore.

When Indian team toured England in 1922, three players came from Aligarh.

In the year 1903 Oxford University Authentics visited India and played a two-day match at Aligarh. The match ended in a draw. On 18 & 19 February 1927 the club played a first-class match against Marylebone Cricket Club at Willingdon Cricket Ground, Aligarh and lost. Nazir Ali also played for the club.

Aligarh Eleven won two consecutive matches against the Parsees cricket team. These two matches were held at Aligarh under the captainship of Khwaja M. Abdullah of Jalandhar. Sir Syed Ahmad Khan and many other respected personalities came to view this match themselves.

Aligarh Eleven at that time was regarded as the best cricket team of the time in India – Professor Llewellyn Tipping.^{[3]}

The remarkable historical match of 'MAO College Cricket Team' / 'Aligarh Eleven' was played in Patiala in February 1900 AD. It was played and won under the captaincy of Ali Hasan. The report of this victory was also published in The Pioneer. This match was against the team of His Highness Maharaja Bhupinder Singh of Patiala. His Highness's team included J. T. Hearne (Middlesex) and W. Brockwell (Surrey). His Highness Maharajadhiraj Sir Bhupendra Singh, ruler of the erstwhile Patiala State, used to bring Patiala, British players of fame to play with and to coach his team players. He invited in his team J. T. Hearne (Middlesex), W. Brockwell (Surrey), C. B. Fry and Frank Tarrant. His Highness Maharajadhiraj Sir Bhupendra Singh donated to the most important national tournament, the Ranji Trophy, to perpetuate the memory of that great cricket wizard, the late His Highness Maharaja Ranjit Singh, lovingly known as "Ranji", about whom Neville Cardus said, "It is not in nature that there should be another Ranji".

By custom, the captain of the club stays at 13 SS East.

== In first-class cricket ==
Cricket Club, Aligarh Muslim University is the only university-based cricket club in India to have played first-class cricket. Playing as "Aligarh Muslim University Past and Present", it made its first-class debut against the Marylebone Cricket Club in a two-day match played on 18 and 19 February 1927 on its home ground. It went on to play two more first-class matches, against Hyderabad and Freelooters, in the Moin-ud-Dowlah Gold Cup Tournament in 1931.

== Inter-Varsity Cricket Honours ==
Rohinton Baria Trophy

- Winners -
- Runners-up - 1937/38, 1942/43, 1946/47.
- 3rd Place -
- Semifinalists* - 1939/40, 1944/45.
- 4th Place - 1985/86, 2015/16.

Note: (*) indicates that before the season 1977/78 there were no matches held for third place.

University Cricket Championship

- Winners -
- Runners-up -
- Semifinalists -

North Zone Inter-University Cricket (Men's) Championship

- Winners -2001/02, 2006/07, 2008/09, 2012/13, 2014/15, 2015/16.
- Runners-up - 1969/70, 1984/85.
- Semifinalists - 1988/89.

== Former Captains ==
- Syed Ali Hasan (1899–1902)
- Abdul Hameed Khan (1920–25)
- Tasadduq Husain (1925–26)
- Aseem (1926–28)
- Inamul Haq (1928–29)
- Mumtaz Ali Khan (1929–30)
- Zahid Saeed (1930–32)
- Jameel Mohammad Khan (1932–34)
- Akhtar Husain (1934–35)
- Zaheeruddin Bassi (1935–37)
- Abdul Aziz Khan (1937–38)
- Inam Ahmad (1938–40)
- S. Maqbool Alam (1940–41)
- Khan Saeed Ahmad (1941–42)
- Muzaffar Khan (1942–43)
- Abdul Majeed Khan (1943–45)
- Bashir Ahmad (1945–46)
- M. S. Khan (1946–47)
- S. M. Mazhar (1947–48)
- A. H. Wadee (1948–49)
- S. Mohsin Hussain (1949–50)
- S. Zameeruddin Alavi (1950–51)
- S. M. Zia (1951–52)
- Qasim Ibrahim Jeeva (1952–53)
- Salahuddin Mehmood (1953–54)
- Md. Saleem (1954–56)
- Md. Abdullah Khan (1956–57)
- Ziaul Haq (1957–60)
- Abdul Hai Mohmed Wadee (1960–61)
- Ahsan Hafeez (1961–62)
- S. Viqaruddin (1962–63)
- Iqbal Mustafa Khan (1963–64)
- N. S. Nazarai (1964–65)
- Tahir Husain (1965–66)
- Mohammad Sahid (1966–67)
- Ahmad Mohsin (1967–68)
- Farhat Ali Khan (1968–69)
- S. Nurul Abidin (1969–70)
- Rafiullah Khan (1970–71)
- Suhail Ahmad (1971–72)
- Javaid Rafiq Ansari (1972–74)
- Haseen Ahmad (1974–75)
- Aslam Ali (1975–76)
- Arif Husain (1976–77)
- Altafur Rehman (1977–78)
- M. Tasleem Khan (1978–79)
- Qamar Ullah Khan (1979–80)
- Bayar Mustafa Khan (1980–81)
- Shahab Ali Khan (1981–82)
- Imran Masood (1982–83)
- M. Arif Farooqi (1983–84)
- Hikmat Ali (1984–85)
- M. Ehtisham (1985–86)
- Miraj H. Khan (1986–88)
- Qasim Zain (1988–89)
- Ahmad Sajid Khan (1989–90)
- Qasim Zain (1990–91)
- Rizwan Shamshad (1991–92)
- Syed Jawed Israr (1992–93)
- Rais Ahmad (1993–94)
- Adnan Shamshad (1994–95)
- Javedur Rehman (1995–96)
- Abdul Mufakhir Adnan (1996–97)
- S. Wajih Jaffar (1997–98)
- Md. Feeroz Khan (1998–99)
- Zia Faisal Husain (1999-00)
- Faisal M. R. K. Sherwani (2000–01)
- Masoodul Zafar Amini (2001–02)
- Salman Shamshad (2002–03)
- Imran Ali (2003–04)
- Md. Rashid (2004–05)
- Md. Masihuddin (2005–06)
- Md. Amir Anwar (2006–07)
- Danish Ahmad (2007–08)
- Md. Asif Intezar (2008–09)
- Meraj Ahmad (2012–13)
- Yassir Kaleem (2013–14)
- Tahmeed Ahmad (2015–16)
