= Premangsu Chatterjee =

Indian cricketer

Personal information
- Full name: Premangsu Mohan Chatterjee
- Born: 10 August 1927; Cuttack, Bihar and Orissa Province, British India
- Died: 12 July 2011 (aged 83); Kolkata, West Bengal, India
- Batting: Left-handed
- Bowling: Left-arm medium-pace

Domestic team information
- Years: Team
- 1946-47 to 1959-60: Bengal

Career statistics
Competition	First-class
Matches	32
Runs scored	727
Batting average	18.64
100s/50s	0/1
Top score	66
Balls bowled	6509
Wickets	134
Bowling average	17.75
5 wickets in innings	11
10 wickets in match	2
Best bowling	10/20
Catches/stumpings	20/0
- Source: Cricinfo, 26 March 2014

Premangsu Mohan Chatterjee (10 August 1927 – 12 July 2011) was an Indian first-class cricketer who represented Bengal as a left-arm medium bowler between 1946/47 and 1959/60, taking 134 first class wickets at 17.75. He was born at Cuttack, Orissa and died at Kolkata, West Bengal.

In a Ranji Trophy match in Jorhat in January 1957, Chatterjee took all 10 wickets in Assam's first innings, finishing with figures of 10 for 20. This remains the best innings return ever achieved in first-class cricket outside the United Kingdom and the third best of all time. The previous season he had taken 7 for 50 and 8 for 59 against Madhya Pradesh in a semi-final of the Ranji Trophy.

Sujit Mukherjee described batting against him in a minor match in Calcutta:

The ball was by no means new when I went in, but I found it curving and dipping as if with a life of its own. Premangshu [sic] bowled round the wicket and barely at medium pace, but was apparently able to swing the ball all day on any ground in Calcutta ... three times I looked for the ball everywhere, and three times my bat was nowhere near the ball as it swung in, pitched and whisked away ... The fourth ball was of fuller length, way outside the off-stump, and I put my left leg right across and prepared to push it firmly away into the covers. I am sure I went through all the motions correctly, but again missed the ball – which, this time, did not miss my leg-stump.

Chatterjee was later a cricket commentator in Bengali during Tests and major Ranji Trophy matches at Eden Gardens, Kolkata.
