= Garrison A Cricket Ground =

Cricket ground in Colchester, Essex

Coordinates: 51.8824°N 0.9018°E

- Interactive map of Garrison A Cricket Ground

Ground information
- Location: Colchester, Essex
- Country: England
- Establishment: 1924 (first recorded match)

Team information
Essex	(1924–1931, 1958, 1966 & 1968–1972)
- As of 25 Jun 2021; Source: Ground profile

Garrison A Cricket Ground is a cricket ground in Colchester, Essex. The first recorded match on the ground was in 1924, when Essex played their first first-class match there against Gloucestershire. Essex played 25 first-class matches there between 1924 and their final first-class match at the ground against Somerset in the 1972 County Championship.

In addition, the ground also hosted two List-A matches, the first of which came in the 1970 John Player League when Essex played Yorkshire. The second and final List-A match at the ground came in the 1972 John Player League when Essex played Lancashire.

The Garrison A Ground is one of two grounds used by Essex in Colchester, along with the Castle Park Cricket Ground. Essex played at the Garrison A Ground between 1924 and 1931 and from 1969 to 1972. They also played one game there in 1958 when the Castle Park ground was flooded, and in 1966 when the first two days of a match at Castle Park were rained off. The game was transferred to the Garrison A Ground and the third day's play took place there.

Used by the Colchester Garrison today, the Army play matches there, with the last recorded match coming in 2008 when the Army played Huntingdonshire there.

The ground is currently used by Real Oddies Cricket Club
