= Kevin Griffith =

English cricketer (born 1950)

Personal information
- Born: 17 January 1950 (age 76); Warrington, England
- Batting: Right-handed
- Bowling: Right-arm off-break

Domestic team information
- Years: Team
- 1967–1972: Worcestershire

Career statistics
Competition	FC	LA
Matches	44	19
Runs scored	795	82
Batting average	15.00	13.66
100s/50s	0/1	0/0
Top score	59	21*
Balls bowled	3,193	210
Wickets	50	3
Bowling average	35.06	43.33
5 wickets in innings	1	0
10 wickets in match	0	N/A
Best bowling	7/41	5/27
Catches/stumpings	17/0	0/0
- Source: CricketArchive, 18 November 2008

Kevin Griffith (born 17 January 1950) is a former English cricketer who played first-class and List A cricket for Worcestershire between 1967 and 1972.

Griffith made his first-class debut against Leicestershire in late August 1967, scoring 11 and 0 and going wicketless in his four overs. He played one more game that season, taking the single wicket of Leicestershire's Peter Marner, and three more in 1968, but did not achieve any notable successes.

1969 was the first season in which Griffith played a significant part, turning out in nine first-class and one List A games. Against Oxford University in June, he claimed a second-innings 7/41, comfortably his best first-class innings return. He played just one first-team game in 1970, being almost entirely confined to the Second XI.

In 1971, he played a substantial part in Worcestershire's season, appearing in 24 first-class games while scoring 575 runs at just under 20 and taking 32 wickets at a little over 37. He also played 14 List A matches. It was in 1971 that Griffith had his best match for Worcestershire, versus Yorkshire in early June: he made 42 and 59 (his only half-century) and took four second-innings wickets as Worcestershire ran out comfortable winners.

In 1972 Griffith played several games early on, including the tour match against the Australians, but was increasingly relegated to the Second XI. Indeed, his last two first-team games — both in the John Player League — were 11 weeks apart.
