= Syed Ali Hasan =

Khan Bahadur Syed Ali Hasan was the captain of the 'MAO College Cricket Club', Superintendent of Police, Deputy Inspector General of Police and Inspector-General of Police in India. In 1930, he was knighted with the title of Khan Bahadur by British India.

He completed an BA at Muhammadan Anglo-Oriental College, Aligarh in 1902. During student life, he played cricket and was Captain of the Muhammadan Anglo-Oriental College Cricket team for three consecutive years (1899 to 1902). In his professional and administrative life, he became the Superintendent of Police (India) and then Deputy Inspector General of Police (DIG). He retired as DIG from Farrukhabad. After retirement, he was reemployed and appointed as Inspector-General of Police (IG) in Gwalior. In 1930, he was knighted a Khan Bahadur by British India. He died in 1962 at Lucknow.

== Family history ==
He was the second son of Syed Afzal Ali. His forefathers Syed Mohammad Ismail were the direct descendant of Imam Ja'far al-Sadiq and came to Kasna, District Bulandshahr from Sabzwar (Afghanistan)

== Life as a cricketer ==
He started playing cricket when he was the student of Muhammadan Anglo-Oriental College at Aligarh. He became famous as “the best bowler in India” when the 'Aligarh Eleven' won two consecutive matches against the Parsees cricket team. These two matches were held at Aligarh under the captainship of Khwaja M. Abdullah of Jalandhar. Sir Syed Ahmad Khan and many other respected personalities came to view this match themselves

After, Khwaja M. Abdullah, he became the captain in 1899 and remained consecutively for three years. Although, MAO College Cricket Club came into existence in 1875 under the patronage of Sir Syed Ahmad Khan, but Ali Hasan promoted the club while he was captain of the MAO College Cricket team. 'Aligarh Eleven' at that time was regarded as the best cricket team of the time in India – Professor Llewellyn Tipping.

The historical match of 'MAO College Cricket Team' / 'Aligarh Eleven' was played in Patiala in February 1900 AD. It was played and won under the captaincy of Ali Hasan. The report of this victory was also published in The Pioneer. This match was against the team of His Highness Maharaja Bhupinder Singh of Patiala. His Highness's team included J. T. Hearne (Middlesex) and W. Brockwell (Surrey). His Highness Maharajadhiraj Sir Bhupendra Singh, ruler of the erstwhile Patiala State, used to bring Patiala, British players of fame to play with and to coach his team players. He invited in his team J. T. Hearne (Middlesex), W. Brockwell (Surrey), C. B. Fry and Frank Tarrant. His Highness Maharajadhiraj Sir Bhupendra Singh donated to the national tournament, the Ranji Trophy, to perpetuate the memory of the deceased His Highness Maharaja Ranjit Singh, known as "Ranji", about whom Neville Cardus said, "It is not in nature that there should be another Ranji".

Ali Hasan also wrote a book on cricket, which could not be published. In 1903, when the team of Marylebone Cricket Club (MCC) visited Aligarh, he was selected for the team although he had left Aligarh and played from the side of 'Aligarh Eleven'.

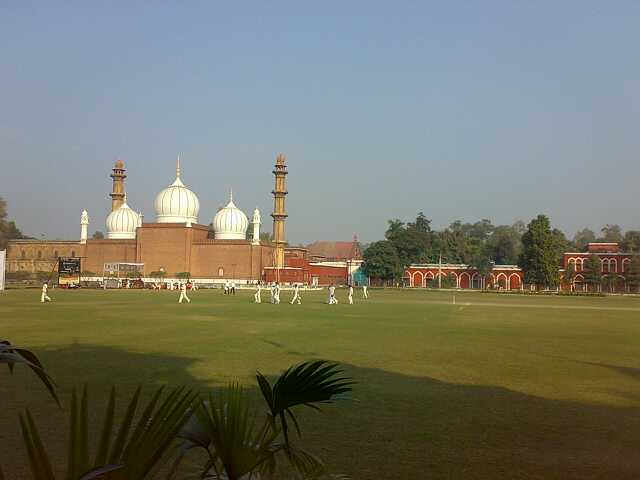
AMU Cricket Pavilion, started as MAO College Cricket Club in 1878

AMU Cricket Pavilion, New block inaugurated in 1936

== See also ==
- Qazi Syed Inayatullah
- Hafiz Mazhar Husain
