= State Bank of India cricket team =

Indian cricket team

State Bank of India were a first-class cricket team sponsored by the State Bank of India that played 23 first-class matches between 1963 and 1973. They won the Moin-ud-Dowlah Gold Cup Tournament seven times.

== Early matches ==
State Bank of India were one of several sponsored teams in the Moin-ud-Dowlah Gold Cup Tournament. They lost their first match in 1963-64, did not participate in 1964-65, and progressed through to the final in 1965-66 on the basis of first-innings leads in two drawn matches, but lost the final to Hyderabad Cricket Association XI.

They were one of the four teams in the first-class Indore Tournament in January 1966 in Indore, but were eliminated in the first round. It was the only time the tournament was held. In August 1966 they toured Ceylon, playing ten matches, one of them first-class against a strong Ceylon Prime Minister's XI, who won by nine wickets.

== Moin-ud-Dowlah Gold Cup Tournament champions ==
State Bank of India won the Moin-ud-Dowlah Gold Cup Tournament for the first time in 1966-67, beating Indian Starlets by 16 runs in the final after trailing by 108 runs on the first innings. Sharad Diwadkar took 11 wickets with his off-spin. They won again in 1967-68, beating Dungarpur XI by seven wickets, Eknath Solkar making 49 and taking 3 for 24 and 6 for 38. Hanumant Singh captained the side to both victories.

They toured Ceylon again in September 1968, playing seven matches, two of them first-class. They won the first match, against Ceylon Board President's Under-27s XI, by an innings, Devraj Govindraj taking 11 wickets for 70. They also beat the Ceylon Board President's XI, by 75 runs, Bishan Bedi taking 3 for 42 and 6 for 37.

Now under the captaincy of Ajit Wadekar, they won the Moin-ud-Dowlah Gold Cup Tournament again in 1968-69, beating Bandodkar's XI by nine wickets. Their run of success was interrupted in 1969-70, when they failed to reach the final, but they won again in 1970-71, 1971-72, 1972-73, when Bedi took 11 wickets in the final against U-Foam, and the last first-class final of the Moin-ud-Dowlah Gold Cup Tournament in 1973-74, when Wadekar scored 176 against U-Foam.

== Overall record and leading players ==
In the Moin-ud-Dowlah Gold Cup Tournament, State Bank of India played 19 matches, winning 7, losing 2 and drawing 10. They were undefeated in their last 15 matches. Their overall first-class record was: played 23, won 9, lost 3, drawn 11.

Ajit Wadekar captained the team's last five championship-winning sides. In all he played 20 times for State Bank of India, scoring 1267 runs at an average of 46.92, with four centuries. Hanumant Singh, his predecessor as captain, played in all 23 of State Bank of India's matches, scoring 1496 runs at 49.86, also with four centuries. Sharad Diwadkar took the most wickets: 64 at 22.15 in 19 matches. Bishan Bedi took 40 wickets at 12.22 in five matches.
