= Bal Gopal Shrestha =

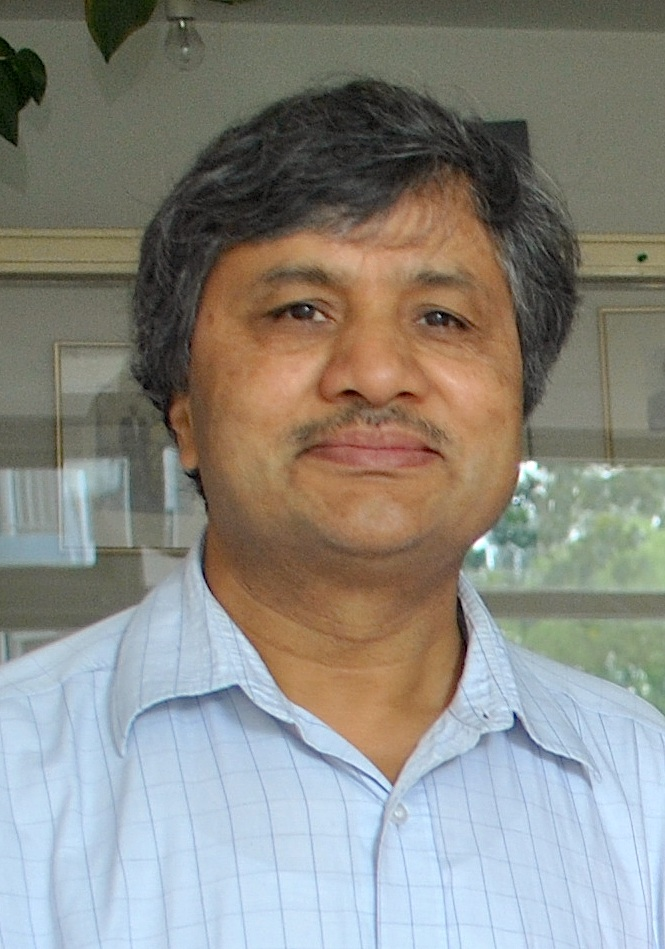
- Born: Sankhu, Nepal
- Education: PhD in Cultural Anthropology (Leiden University), MA in political science (Tribhuvan University, Kirtipur Kathmandu, Nepal)
- Occupations: Cultural anthropologist, writer, journalist
- Spouse: Srilaxmi Shrestha
- Children: 3

Bal Gopal Shrestha is a cultural anthropologist based in the Netherlands. He was born in Sankhu, a small town near Kathmandu, the capital of Nepal, and finished his MA (political science) from Tribhuvan University. Later Shrestha completed a PhD in cultural anthropology at Leiden University in 2002.

Dr Shrestha has been a Jan Gonda fellow at the International Institute for Asian Studies (IIAS), Leiden (2001–02), offered to him by The Royal Netherlands Academy of Arts and Sciences, Amsterdam. He was also awarded the Frederick Williamson Memorial Fund by the University of Cambridge (2003). Between 2004 & 2006 Shrestha was a research fellow at the Centro Incontri Umani, Ascona, Switzerland. He also taught Politics of South and Southeast Asia at Leiden University (2006–07). In 2009 he joined the Institute of Social and Cultural Anthropology at the University of Oxford, where he has been carrying out research on the Nepalese diaspora in the UK and Belgium.

He has published widely on Nepalese religious rituals, Hinduism, Buddhism, ethnic nationalism, the Maoist movement, political developments in Nepal, and the Nepalese diaspora.

Besides numerous journal articles and book chapters, Shrestha has also authored two monographs: The Sacred Town of Sankhu: The Anthropology of Newar Rituals, Religion and Society in Nepal (Cambridge Scholar Publishing 2012, paperback 2013), and The Newars of Sikkim: Reinventing Language, Culture and Identity in the Diaspora (Vajra Books 2015). He has also written and translated a number of literary and research books in his native Nepal Bhasa (Newar language), including the Folk Stories of Sri Lanka. Some of his poems have also been translated into English.

Together with the late A.W. van den Hoek and Dirk J. Nijland, Bal Gopal Shrestha has also made the award-winning ethnographic documentary Sacrifice of Serpents: The Festival of Indrayani, Kathmandu (Leiden, 1997). The documentary received wide public acclaim in Nepal, France, the Netherlands, and the United States. Among other places it was screened at Harvard, Princeton, Cornell and Oxford universities. It was also the recipient of 'Award of Commendation' by the American Anthropological Association, Philadelphia. He has also been honoured with the Thakurlal Manandhar Award (1993) by the Nepal Bhasa Parisad (The Newar Language Literary Council), Kathmandu for his literary contributions to the Newar language.
