= Bal Phondke =

Scientist, Author, Science fiction Writer

Bal Phondke (born 22 April 1939) is the pen name of Dr Gajanan Phondke, a leading Marathi writer of science literature (fiction and non-fiction). He is credited in part to have started the science fiction genre of writing in Marathi literature. Alongside Dr. Jayant Narlikar's science fiction work Baal Phondke's works had a cult following in a generation of readers in Maharashtra.

== Career ==
He worked as a nuclear biologist at the Bhabha Atomic Research Centre from 1962 to 1983. From 1983 to 1989, he was with the Times of India, serving as the Editor of Science Today magazine and also as the science editor of The Times of India broadsheet.

He later served as the editor-in-chief of Science Reporter, as well as director of the Publications and Information Directorate of CSIR (Council of Scientific and Industrial Research), retiring in 1999.

After retirement, he served as a guide for various universities and also wrote science articles for several publications.

Bal Phondke has also published books on fun with mathematics.
