= Freelooters Cricket Team =

The Freelooters cricket team was a first-class cricket team of British India which took part in the Moin-ud-Dowlah Gold Cup Tournament, beginning in December 1931. The team played in the competition until 1934 and played six first-class matches in the process.

The team was established by the Maharajkumar of Vizianagram and captained by the Fateh Singh of Alirajpur.

In the 1931–32 final Freelooters overwhelmed Aligarh Muslim University Past and Present by 432 runs; for the victors Vijay Merchant and Sorabji Colah each scored a century and Amar Singh took nine wickets.
