= Indian Starlets =

Indian cricket team

Indian Starlets were a team of young Indian cricketers who played 16 first-class matches between 1960 and 1967.

== Tour of Pakistan, 1959-60 ==
Seventeen players took part in a tour of Pakistan in April and May 1960. They played seven first-class matches; all were drawn. The players, with their ages at the beginning of the tour, were:

- Sudhakar Adhikari (20)
- Lala Amarnath (48) (captain in the two matches he played)
- Prem Bhatia (20)
- Dinabandu (age unknown)
- Farokh Engineer (22)
- William Ghosh (31)
- Habib Ahmed (21) (captain in four of the five matches he played)
- Harcharan Singh (21)
- M. L. Jaisimha (21) (captain in one of the five matches he played)
- V. V. Kumar (24)
- Gulshran Mehra (22)
- Madan Mehra (25)
- Vijay Mehra (22)
- A. G. Milkha Singh (18)
- B. B. Nimbalkar (40)
- Chatta Ramesh (26)
- Ponnuswami Sitaram (27)

Milkha Singh was the leading batsman, with 469 runs at an average of 117.25 and three centuries. Ghosh, Kumar and Sitaram were the most successful bowlers.

Apart from the experienced Amarnath, while most of the players had substantial careers in Indian domestic cricket, only Engineer, Jaisimha, Kumar, Vijay Mehra and Milkha Singh went on to play Test cricket.

== Moin-ud-Dowlah Gold Cup Tournament ==
Indian Starlets played a friendly match in March 1963 against an Andhra Chief Minister's XI. It was drawn.

Between 1964-65 and 1967-68 Indian Starlets competed in the annual first-class Moin-ud-Dowlah Gold Cup Tournament held in Hyderabad at Lal Bahadur Shastri Stadium. They played eight matches in all, drawing the first six and losing the last two. They reached the final in 1964-65 (in which their opponents, Associated Cement Company, were declared the winners on the basis of their 253-run first innings lead) and in 1966–67, when they lost to State Bank of India by 16 runs.

Of their 16 first-class matches, Indian Starlets drew the first 14 and lost the last two.

Indian Starlets teams also toured Malaysia in 1973 and Sri Lanka in 1978–79, but no first-class matches were played on either tour.
