= Ajit Wadekar =

Indian cricketer (1941–2018)

- Ajit Wadekar

Personal information
- Full name: Ajit Laxman Wadekar
- Born: 1 April 1941; Bombay, Bombay Presidency, British India
- Died: 15 August 2018 (aged 77); Mumbai, Maharashtra, India
- Batting: Left-handed
- Bowling: Left-arm medium Slow left-arm orthodox
- Role: Batsman

International information
- National side: India (1966–1974)
- Test debut (cap 112): 13 December 1966 v West Indies
- Last Test: 4 July 1974 v England
- ODI debut (cap 11): 13 July 1974 v England
- Last ODI: 15 July 1974 v England

Domestic team information
- Years: Team
- 1959–1974: Bombay

Career statistics
| Competition | Test | ODI | FC | LA |
|---|---|---|---|---|
| Matches | 37 | 2 | 237 | 5 |
| Runs scored | 2,113 | 73 | 15,380 | 193 |
| Batting average | 31.07 | 36.50 | 47.03 | 64.33 |
| 100s/50s | 1/14 | 0/1 | 36/84 | 0/2 |
| Top score | 143 | 67 | 323 | 87 |
| Balls bowled | 61 | – | 1,622 | – |
| Wickets | 0 | – | 21 | – |
| Bowling average | – | – | 43.23 | – |
| 5 wickets in innings | – | – | 0 | – |
| 10 wickets in match | – | – | 0 | – |
| Best bowling | – | – | 2/0 | – |
| Catches/stumpings | 46/– | 1/– | 271/– | 3/– |
- Source: ESPNcricinfo, 28 September 2012

National Captaincy of A. L. Wadekar
- Military career
- Allegiance: India national cricket team
- Captaincy: 1971-1974
- Series: West Indies; Antilles 70-71 🟢; England; England 71 🟢; India 72-73 🟢; England 74 🔴

Ajit Laxman Wadekar (1 April 1941 – 15 August 2018) was an Indian international cricketer who played for the Indian national team between 1966 and 1974. Described as an "aggressive batsman", Wadekar made his first-class debut in 1958, before making his foray into international cricket in 1966. He batted at number three and was considered to be one of the finest slip fielders. Wadekar also captained the Indian cricket team which won series in the West Indies and England in 1971 (first victory of Indian team in test cricket outside of India was recorded in 1968 under the captaincy of Mansoor Ali Khan Pataudi against New Zealand). The Government of India honoured him with the Arjuna Award (1967) and Padmashri (1972), India's fourth highest civilian honour. In 2011, he received the C. K. Nayudu Lifetime Achievement Award, the highest honour Indian board can bestow on a former player.

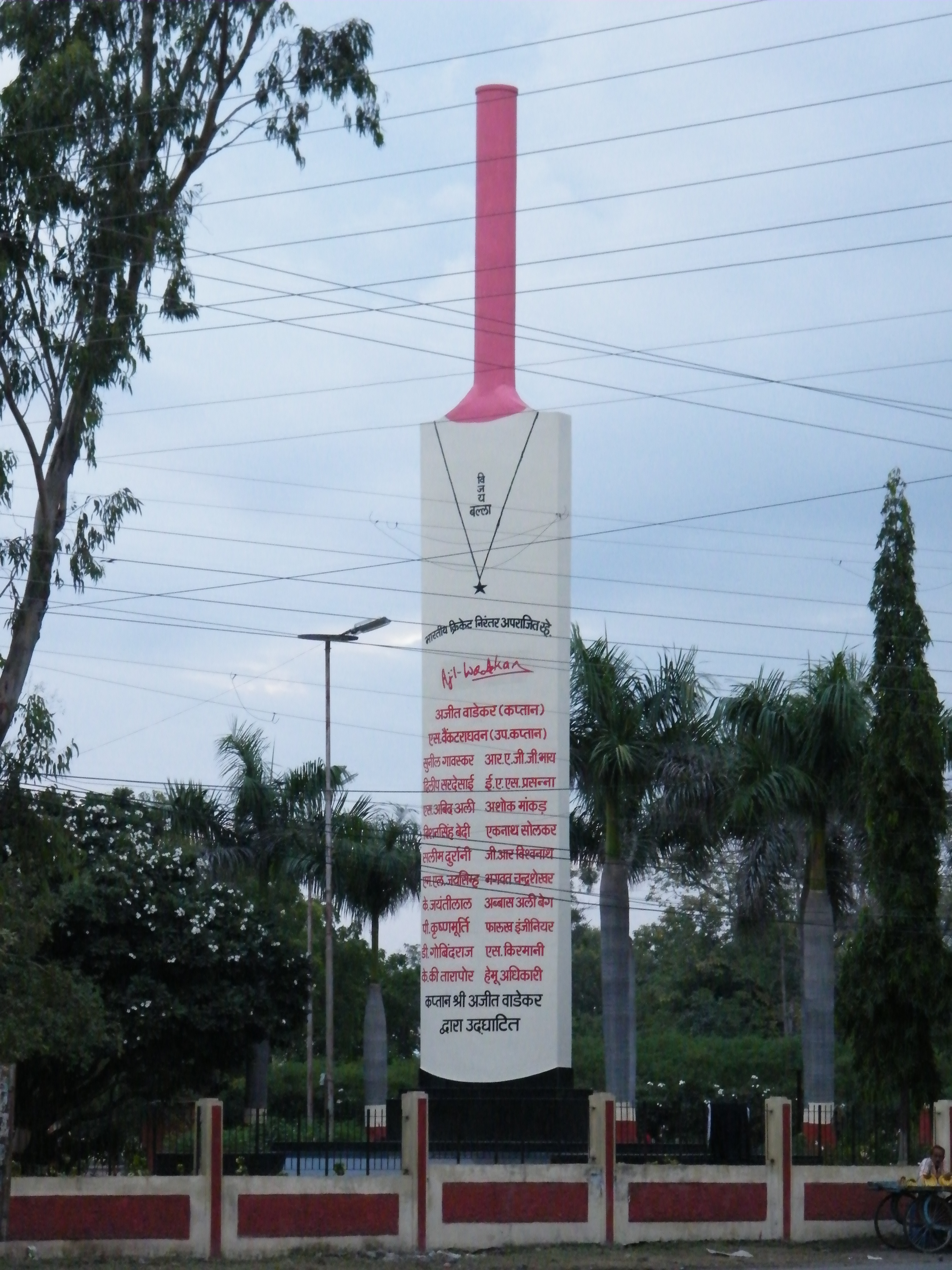
"Vijay Balla" (trans : Victory bat) a victory memorabilia made out of concrete with names of the players of the Indian team who won the test series against England (1971) and Gary Sobers' West Indies (1970–71), present at Nehru stadium, Indore.

== Early life ==
Born in brahmin family at Bombay, Wadekar's father wished him to study Mathematics so that he could become an engineer, but Wadekar instead preferred to play cricket.

== Career ==
=== Introduction to cricket ===
He made his first-class debut for Bombay in 1958–59, before making his international debut in Test in December 1966, against the West Indies at the Brabourne Stadium in Bombay. After that he became a part of the regular team, and went on to play 37 Test matches for India between 1966 and 1974, generally batting at number three. He was also working in State Bank of India as part-time job as at that time there was not much money in cricket and so cricket was played for hobby, maintaining the pride of the nation rather than having a luxury life or as a profession. According to Wadekar at that time 2500 Rs were paid to the players for playing each test match.

=== Captaincy and overseas wins ===
Wadekar was appointed the captain of Bombay, and soon was made the captain of the Indian cricket team in 1971, leading a team that included players like Sunil Gavaskar, Gundappa Viswanath, Farokh Engineer, Dilip Sardesai and the Indian spin quartet that included Bishen Bedi, E.A.S. Prasanna, Bhagwat Chandrasekhar and Srinivasaraghavan Venkataraghavan. India won over five matches in the West Indies in the early 1970s, and then defeated England over three. He led India to a third successive series victory, beating England cricket team again, 2–1 in a five-match series in 1972–73.

Wadekar continued to be the captain of the Indian team that toured England in 1974. He represented India in its first ever One Day International (ODI) game during that tour. Batting at number three, Wadekar made 67 runs, but still ended on the losing team. He scored 73 runs in his ODI career at an average of 36.50 with a strike rate of 81.11. Following India's dismal performance in the series, he retired from international cricket. After that tour Wadekar played just one more First-class match before retiring from all forms of cricket.

=== Post-retirement ===
Wadekar also served as the manager of the Indian cricket team in the 1990s, alongside captain Mohammad Azharuddin. He is one of the few Indians to represent the country as Test player, captain, coach/manager and the chairman of selectors. Rahul Dravid, Lala Amarnath and Chandu Borde are the only other players to achieve this distinction.

== Death ==
On 15 August 2018, Wadekar died due to illness at Jaslok Hospital, Mumbai, at the age of 78. On 17 August, he was cremated with full state honours in the Shivaji Park crematorium in Mumbai. Many cricketers, as well as cricket fans in large numbers, attended his funeral.

== Awards and honours ==
Wadekar was honoured with the Arjuna Award, instituted by the Government of India to recognise sporting talents. In 1972, he received the Padmashri, India's fourth highest civilian honour. Other awards include CK Nayudu Lifetime achievement award, Sportsperson of the Year, and the Castrol Lifetime Achievement award.

| Preceded by Nawab of Pataudi Jr | Indian National Test Cricket Captain; 1970/71–1974 | Succeeded by Nawab of Pataudi Jr |
| Preceded by Abbas Ali Baig | Indian National Cricket Manager; September 1992 – March 1996 | Succeeded by Sandeep Patil |
| Preceded by Kishan Rungta | Chairman, Selection Committee; October 1998 – September 1999 | Succeeded by Chandu Borde |
