= Moin-ud-Dowlah Gold Cup Tournament =

The Moin-ud-Dowlah Gold Cup Tournament is an Indian cricket competition that has been held in Hyderabad (and sometimes nearby Secunderabad) since the 1930–31 season. From 1930–31 to 1937–38, and from 1962–63 to 1973–74, it had first-class status.

== 1930–31 to 1937–38 ==
In 1930 the Nawab Moin-Ud-Dowlah Bahadur Asman Jah donated a trophy to be played for each year by a team representing Hyderabad and various invitational teams. Many of the best Indian players played in the tournaments, and in the 1930s several overseas players also played. In the final in 1930–31 Jack Hobbs and Herbert Sutcliffe played for the Maharaj Kumar of Vizianagram's XI in their victory over the Nawab of Moin-ud-Dowlah's XI, although the key player in the victory was C. K. Nayudu, who made a century and took seven wickets.

In the 1931–32 final Freelooters overwhelmed Aligarh Muslim University Past and Present by 432 runs; for the victors Vijay Merchant and Sorabji Colah each scored a century and Amar Singh took nine wickets. In 1932–33 Freelooters again won the final easily, beating Karachi by an innings and 166 runs, with another century to Colah, one to Dilawar Hussain, and seven more wickets to Amar Singh. The next tournament was in 1934–35, and despite being reinforced by the presence of Learie Constantine, Freelooters lost this time to Retrievers, by three wickets, in a match watched by 15,000 spectators. The last tournament in the 1930s was in 1937–38, when Hyderabad State beat Hyderabad Cricket Association XI by 159 runs.

The advent of the Ranji Trophy in 1934–35, which for the first time brought together teams from all over India in first-class competition, took away some of the interest in the Moin-Ud-Dowlah Gold Cup. It lost its first-class status after 1938 and became a minor local competition.

== 1962–63 to 1973–74 ==
With the aim of strengthening domestic first-class cricket, the Board of Control for Cricket in India instituted the Irani Trophy in 1959–60, the Duleep Trophy in 1961–62, and revived the Moin-Ud-Dowlah Gold Cup in 1962–63. Held in October at Lal Bahadur Shastri Stadium, Hyderabad, for 12 years it served as a first-class season-opener for most of the leading Indian players. Many of the participating teams were sponsored: Vazir Sultan Tobacco, U-Foam (a polyurethane manufacturer) (both companies based in Hyderabad), State Bank of India and Associated Cement Company were some of the companies that fielded teams. The Indian Starlets team of young players also competed, and Hyderabad Cricket Association XI resumed the spot it had held in the competition in the 1930s.

At first Associated Cement Company, led by Madhav Mantri and Bapu Nadkarni, were the strongest team, but in the late 1960s State Bank of India came to dominate, winning seven of the last eight first-class competitions. They played 19 matches, winning 7, losing 2 and drawing 10. They were undefeated in their last 15 matches. The Test players Ajit Wadekar, Bishan Bedi, V.V. Kumar, Hanumant Singh, Baloo Gupte, Budhi Kunderan, Venkataraman Subramanya, Ambar Roy and Syed Abid Ali were among the team's regular members.

== First-class winners ==
In the years when the Moin-ud-Dowlah Gold Cup Tournament had first-class status, the winners and runners-up were as follows:

Season	Winners	Runners-up	Margin
1930–31	Maharaj Kumar of Vizianagram's XI	Nawab of Moin-ud-Dowlah's XI	9 wickets
1931–32	Freelooters	Aligarh Muslim University Past and Present	432 runs
1932–33	Freelooters	Karachi	Innings and 166 runs
1934–35	Retrievers	Freelooters	3 wickets
1937–38	Hyderabad State	Hyderabad Cricket Association XI	159 runs
1962–63	Associated Cement Company	M.A. Chidambaram's XI	First innings lead
1963–64	Maharaj Kumar of Vizianagram's XI	Associated Cement Company	5 wickets
1964–65	Associated Cement Company	Indian Starlets	First innings lead
1965–66	Hyderabad Cricket Association XI	State Bank of India	100 runs
1966–67	State Bank of India	Indian Starlets	16 runs
1967–68	State Bank of India	Dungarpur XI	7 wickets
1968–69	State Bank of India	Bandodkar's XI	9 wickets
1969–70	R. K. Mody's XI	Hyderabad Cricket Association XI	5 wickets
1970–71	State Bank of India	Hyderabad Cricket Association XI	First innings lead
1971–72	State Bank of India	Associated Cement Company	First innings lead
1972–73	State Bank of India	U-Foam	8 wickets
1973–74	State Bank of India	U-Foam	First innings lead

== Current status ==
The non-first-class competition was of three-day matches until 1989–90. After a hiatus it resumed in 1993–94 as a one-day 50-over competition. It is now held each year in August and September at various grounds in Hyderabad and Secunderabad, with the final at Rajiv Gandhi International Cricket Stadium in Hyderabad. Teams from various regional cricket associations around India compete. The Hyderabad Cricket Association XI won in 2017–18. The tournament has not been held since, although in 2020 Mohammad Azharuddin, the president of the Hyderabad Cricket Association, expressed the hope that it could be revived.

== Other source ==
- Wisden Cricketers' Almanack
