= Mumbai cricket team =

Indian domestic cricket team

Personnel
- Captain: Shardul Thakur (FC); Shreyas Iyer (LA & T20)
- Coach: Omkar Salvi
- Owner: Mumbai Cricket Association

Team information
- Founded: 1865
- Home ground: Wankhede Stadium
- Capacity: 33,108

History
- Ranji Trophy wins: 42
- Irani Cup wins: 15 (1 shared)
- Syed Mushtaq Ali Trophy wins: 2
- Official website: www.mumbaicricket.com

The Mumbai cricket team is a premier first-class cricket team that represents Mumbai in Indian domestic competitions. Governed by the Mumbai Cricket Association (MCA), its jurisdiction extends across Mumbai City, Mumbai Suburban, Thane, Palghar, and Navi Mumbai (up to Kharghar). The team's primary home ground is the Wankhede Stadium, which also houses the headquarters of the Board of Control for Cricket in India (BCCI).

Mumbai is historically the most dominant force in Indian cricket, holding a record 42 Ranji Trophy titles, most recently winning the 2023–24 season by defeating Vidarbha. The team also holds 15 Irani Cup titles, having ended a 27-year drought by clinching the 2024–25 Irani Cup in Lucknow.

Known for its resilient "Khadoos" style of play and a legacy as a "batting powerhouse," the team was formerly known as the Bombay cricket team until the city was renamed in 1996. Mumbai has produced the highest number of international cricketers for India, including legends such as Sunil Gavaskar, Sachin Tendulkar, and Rohit Sharma and star players like Jemimah Rodrigues in women's team.

== History ==
The first recorded cricket match in Mumbai took place between a Military XI and an Island XI in 1797. The affluent Parsis of Mumbai founded the short-lived Orient Cricket Club in 1848. In 1850, the Young Zoroastrian Club, which exists to this day, was founded. In 1884, Sir Dorabji Tata formed the Parsi Gymkhana and helped an all-Parsi team tour England in 1886. Despite a cricketing failure, the Parsis organised another tour of England in 1888.

In 1889–90, an English team captained by Lord Hawke played against the Parsis at the Gymkhana Ground. The Parsis pulled off a famous victory, the first for an Indian team against English opposition. The Bombay Tournament, starting in 1892, evolved from a Parsi vs. European contest into the famous Quadrangular (1912) and eventually the Pentangular (1937) with the inclusion of Muslim, Hindu, and "Rest" teams.

In 1930, the Bombay Cricket Association was established to govern the sport in the Presidency. Following the separation of the Gujarat Cricket Association and Maharashtra Cricket Association in 1934, the BCA limited its jurisdiction to Greater Mumbai and Thane district.

=== Ranji Trophy ===
==== Early success ====
Bombay won the inaugural Ranji Trophy in 1934–35, led by Vijay Merchant. They won 7 of the first 20 titles, establishing themselves as a domestic powerhouse. In a 1948–49 semi-final against Maharashtra, Mumbai became the first first-class team to score over 600 runs in both innings (651 and 714).

==== 1950s–1970s dominance and the 15-year streak ====
Mumbai's dominance reached its zenith between 1955 and 1977, when the team won 20 out of 22 titles. This included a world-record streak of 15 consecutive Ranji Trophy titles from 1958–59 to 1972–73. This era began under the captaincy of Polly Umrigar and continued under leaders such as Bapu Nadkarni, Ajit Wadekar, and Sudhir Naik.

==== The "Khadoos" Philosophy ====
A defining element of Mumbai's identity is the "Khadoos" brand of cricket. This philosophy, roughly translating to "stubborn" or "tenacious," emphasizes batting for long durations, putting a high price on one's wicket, and psychological dominance. This culture was pioneered by Vijay Merchant and later epitomized by Sunil Gavaskar, Dilip Vengsarkar, and Sachin Tendulkar.

==== 1980s–2000s and Move to Wankhede ====
The late 1980s saw a brief slump, but the team resurged in the 1990s. A significant historical shift occurred in 1974 when the team moved from Brabourne Stadium to the newly constructed Wankhede Stadium following a dispute between the MCA and the Cricket Club of India. In the 2006–07 Ranji Trophy, Mumbai won their 37th title after recovering from losing their first three games and being 0/5 in the semi-final.

==== Recent history (2020–present) ====
Mumbai secured their record-extending 42nd Ranji Trophy title in the 2023–24 season, defeating Vidarbha. In October 2024, they ended a 27-year wait for the Irani Cup, claiming their 15th title against the Rest of India.

==== Landmark Matches ====
Mumbai's history is punctuated by several milestone matches that highlight their long-term dominance in the Ranji Trophy.

- 1st Match (1935): Led by L.P. Jai, Mumbai made its debut against Gujarat in Ahmedabad, securing an innings lead.
- 100th Match (1962): Under Polly Umrigar, Mumbai defeated Gujarat at Brabourne Stadium during their 15-year winning streak.
- 300th Match (1994): Mumbai avenged their famous 1991 final loss by crushing Haryana. Amol Muzumdar made a world-record debut score of 260 in this match.
- 500th Match (2017): Mumbai became the first team to reach the 500-match milestone in Ranji Trophy history, playing against Baroda.

==== Winning Captains ====
A total of 25 different captains have led Mumbai to a Ranji Trophy title. Notable multi-time winning captains include:

- Ajit Wadekar (4 titles): 1968–69, 1969–70, 1971–72, 1972–73.
- Madhav Mantri (3 titles): 1951–52, 1955–56, 1956–57.
- Sunil Gavaskar (3 titles): 1976–77, 1983–84, 1984–85.
- Wasim Jaffer (2 titles): 2008–09, 2009–10.
- Ajinkya Rahane (1 title): Led the team to its most recent 42nd title in 2023–24.

==== Historic Rivalries ====
The Mumbai–Maharashtra rivalry (often called the "Maharashtra Derby") is one of the oldest in Indian cricket. A famous encounter occurred in the 1948–49 Ranji Trophy semi-final where Mumbai scored 651 and 714, the only time a team has crossed 600 in both innings of a first-class match. Another fierce rivalry exists with the Karnataka (formerly Mysore), who famously broke Mumbai's 15-year winning streak in the 1973–74 semi-final.

== Grounds ==
=== Brabourne Stadium ===
The Governor of Bombay Lord Brabourne granted the Cricket Club of India (CCI) land to build the stadium after a meeting with BCCI founder Anthony de Mello. The foundation stone was laid on 22 May 1936, and the ground was officially opened on 7 December 1937.

Mumbai played its home matches here until 1971. A historic dispute between CCI president Vijay Merchant and the BCA over seat allocations for the 1972–73 England tour led to the BCA constructing its own stadium.

=== Wankhede Stadium ===
Since 1974, the Wankhede Stadium has been Mumbai's primary home. It is famous for its "red soil" pitches which offer bounce and significant turn as the match progresses. In the 1984–85 Ranji Trophy, Ravi Shastri hit six sixes in an over here against Baroda, recording the fastest first-class double century at the time (113 minutes). In 2017, the venue hosted Mumbai's landmark 500th Ranji Trophy match.

=== Bandra Kurla Complex Ground ===
Opened in 2007, the BKC Ground serves as a secondary home and the site of the MCA Indoor Cricket Academy. It features state-of-the-art practice facilities and has hosted several Ranji Trophy and age-group matches.

== Representative identity ==
=== Jurisdiction and crest ===
Although named after the city of Mumbai, the team represents a broader region including Mumbai City, Mumbai Suburban, Thane, Palghar, and parts of Raigad (specifically Navi Mumbai up to Kharghar). The team's crest features a traditional lion emblem with a cricket ball, symbolizing the strength and "Khadoos" spirit of the side.

=== Kit and colours ===
Mumbai's kits are designed to reflect the city's coastal heritage. In First-class cricket, the team wears traditional cricket whites. For limited-overs competitions (Vijay Hazare Trophy and Syed Mushtaq Ali Trophy), the primary colours are Navy Blue and Gold. The 2025–26 limited-overs design features a tonal wave pattern inspired by the Arabian Sea.

=== Sponsorship and manufacturers ===
The team's commercial identity has modernised significantly, with the Mumbai Cricket Association (MCA) securing long-term partnerships with global brands.

Period	Kit manufacturer	Principal sponsor
2021–2023	Omtex Sports	Skechers
2023–2024	Aarka Sports	Dream11
2024–present	Aarka Sports	Amul

== Statistics and honours ==
=== Tournament Summary ===
Mumbai is the only domestic team in India to have won the premier trophy in all three major formats (First-class, List A, and Twenty20) multiple times.

Format	Tournament	Winners	Runners-up	Most Recent Win
First-class	Ranji Trophy	42	6	2023–24
First-class	Irani Cup	15	13	2024–25
List A	Vijay Hazare Trophy	4	1	2020–21
List A	Wills Trophy	8	2	1997–98
Twenty20	Syed Mushtaq Ali Trophy	2	0	2024–25

=== Format-wise Highlights ===
==== First-class (Red Ball) ====
Mumbai's red-ball dominance is unparalleled in global domestic cricket. In addition to 42 Ranji titles, the team held a world-record streak of 15 consecutive titles between 1958 and 1973. They have made a record 29 appearances in the Irani Cup, winning their 15th title in October 2024 after a 27-year drought.

==== List A (One Day) ====
Mumbai was the inaugural champion of the Ranji One Day Trophy (the predecessor to the Vijay Hazare Trophy) in 2003–04. Before the expansion of the Vijay Hazare format, Mumbai dominated the Wills Trophy, securing 8 titles between 1981 and 1998. In 2021, the team set a then-tournament record total of 457/4 against Puducherry.

==== Twenty20 ====
Mumbai clinched their first Syed Mushtaq Ali Trophy (SMAT) in 2022–23 and doubled their tally in the 2024–25 season by defeating Madhya Pradesh in the final. The team's T20 success is heavily bolstered by its players' experience in the Indian Premier League.

=== Records and statistics ===
Mumbai became the first team to play 500 matches in the Ranji Trophy in 2017.

==== Individual records ====
- Most runs: Wasim Jaffer (12,038 runs)
- Highest individual score: Prithvi Shaw (379 vs Assam, 2022–23)
- Most centuries: Wasim Jaffer (40)
- Highest career average (min. 2000 runs): Vijay Merchant (98.35)
- Most wickets: Padmakar Shivalkar (589 wickets)

==== Team records ====
- Highest team total: 714 vs Maharashtra (1948–49)
- Unique Record: In the 2023–24 Ranji Trophy quarter-final, Mumbai's Tanush Kotian and Tushar Deshpande became the first No. 10 and No. 11 in First-class history to both score centuries in the same innings.

== Notable players ==
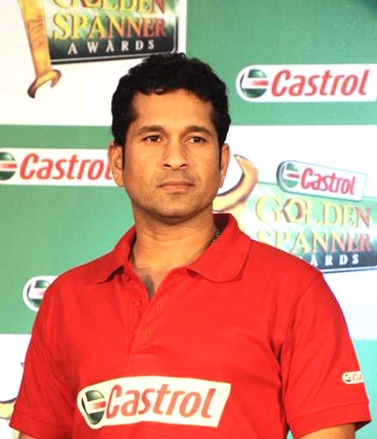
Sachin Tendulkar, one of many Mumbai legends to represent India.

Mumbai is often described as the "nursery of Indian cricket," having produced over 70 international players. The team is historically renowned for its resilient "Khadoos" batting style and prolific spin bowling.

=== Early Pioneers (1930s–1950s) ===
During the formative years of the Ranji Trophy, Mumbai was led by technical masters who set the standard for Indian domestic cricket.

- Dattaram Hindlekar
- KC Ibrahim
- Khandu Rangnekar
- Laxmidas Jai
- Madhav Mantri
- Polly Umrigar
- Rusi Modi
- Vijay Merchant

=== The Golden Era (1960s–1980s) ===
This period saw Mumbai's 15-year winning streak and the emergence of world-class batsmen and versatile all-rounders.

- Ajit Wadekar
- Ashok Mankad
- Bapu Nadkarni
- Dilip Sardesai
- Dilip Vengsarkar
- Eknath Solkar
- Farokh Engineer
- Gulabrai Ramchand
- Ramakant Desai
- Ravi Shastri
- Sandeep Patil
- Sunil Gavaskar

=== Modern Legends (1990s–2010s) ===
The era was dominated by the rise of Sachin Tendulkar and a new generation of aggressive yet technically sound players.

- Abey Kuruvilla
- Ajit Agarkar
- Amol Muzumdar
- Dhawal Kulkarni
- Jatin Paranjpe
- Nilesh Kulkarni
- Paras Mhambrey
- Pravin Amre
- Ramesh Powar
- Sachin Tendulkar
- Sairaj Bahutule
- Sanjay Manjrekar
- Vinod Kambli
- Wasim Jaffer
- Zaheer Khan

=== Current International and Domestic Stars (2020s) ===
Mumbai continues to provide the core of the Indian national side across all formats.

- Ajinkya Rahane
- Ayush Mhatre
- Musheer Khan
- Prithvi Shaw
- Rohit Sharma
- Sarfaraz Khan
- Shardul Thakur
- Shivam Dube
- Shreyas Iyer
- Suryakumar Yadav
- Tanush Kotian
- Tushar Deshpande
- Yashasvi Jaiswal

== Current squad ==
Players with international caps are listed in bold.

Name	Birth date	Batting style	Bowling style	Notes
Batters
**Sarfaraz Khan**	22 October 1997 (age 29)	Right-handed	Right-arm leg break	Plays for Chennai Super Kings in IPL
Siddhesh Lad	23 May 1992 (age 34)	Right-handed	Right-arm off break	
Angkrish Raghuvanshi	5 June 2005 (age 21)	Right-handed	Slow left-arm orthodox	Plays for Kolkata Knight Riders in IPL
**Yashasvi Jaiswal**	28 December 2001 (age 24)	Left-handed	Right-arm leg break	Plays for Rajasthan Royals in IPL
Ayush Mhatre	16 July 2007 (age 19)	Right-handed	Right-arm off break	Plays for Chennai Super Kings in IPL
**Suryakumar Yadav**	14 September 1990 (age 36)	Right-handed	Right-arm medium	Plays for Mumbai Indians in IPL
**Rohit Sharma**	30 April 1987 (age 39)	Right-handed	Right-arm off break	Plays for Mumbai Indians in IPL
**Shreyas Iyer**	6 December 1994 (age 31)	Right-handed	Right-arm off break	**List A & Twenty20 Captain**; Plays for Punjab Kings in IPL
Divyaansh Saxena	13 February 2001 (age 25)	Left-handed		
All-Rounders
Musheer Khan	27 February 2005 (age 21)	Right-handed	Slow left-arm orthodox	Plays for Punjab Kings in IPL
Suryansh Shedge	29 January 2003 (age 23)	Right-handed	Right-arm medium	Plays for Punjab Kings in IPL
Atharva Ankolekar	26 September 2000 (age 26)	Left-handed	Slow left-arm orthodox	
**Shivam Dube**	26 June 1993 (age 33)	Left-handed	Right-arm medium	Plays for Chennai Super Kings in IPL
Wicket-keepers
Hardik Tamore	20 October 1997 (age 29)	Right-handed	—	
Akash Anand	24 October 1995 (age 31)	Right-handed	—	
Spin Bowlers
Shams Mulani	13 March 1997 (age 29)	Left-handed	Slow left-arm orthodox	
Tanush Kotian	16 October 1998 (age 28)	Right-handed	Right-arm off break	
Maxwell Swaminathan	18 January 1999 (age 27)	Right-handed	Right-arm off break	
Pace Bowlers
**Tushar Deshpande**	15 May 1995 (age 31)	Right-handed	Right-arm medium-fast	
**Shardul Thakur**	16 October 1991 (age 35)	Right-handed	Right-arm medium-fast	**First-class Captain**; Plays for Mumbai Indians in IPL
Mohit Avasthi	18 November 1992 (age 34)	Right-handed	Right-arm medium-fast	
Sairaj Patil	31 October 1996 (age 30)	Right-handed	Right-arm medium-fast	
Onkar Tarmale	22 August 2002 (age 24)	Right-handed	Right-arm medium-fast	
Sylvester D'Souza	18 December 1998 (age 27)	Right-handed	Right-arm medium-fast	
Irfan Umair	27 July 1996 (age 30)	Left-handed	Left-arm medium-fast	

Updated as of 17 November 2026. Domestic selections confirmed by MCA; IPL affiliations reflect the 2025 Mega Auction and December 2025 Mini-Auction.

== Support staff ==
=== Men's cricket team ===
Following the team's record-extending 42nd Ranji Trophy title and 15th Irani Cup victory, the Mumbai Cricket Association (MCA) retained the core coaching unit for the 2025–26 domestic season.

- Head Coach – Omkar Salvi
- Batting Coach – Vinit Indulkar
- Fielding Coach – Onkar Gurav
- Assistant Coach – Wilkin Mota
- Team Manager – Arman Mallick
- Video Analyst – Ganesh Tyagi
- Strength & Conditioning Coach – Amogh Pandit
- Physiotherapist – Abhishek Sawant
- Masseur – Sunil Rajguru

==== Selection Committee ====
The senior selection committee is chaired by former India pacer Raju Kulkarni.

1. Raju Kulkarni (Chairman)
2. Sanjay Patil
3. Ravindra Thaker
4. Jeetendra Thackeray
5. Kiran Powar

=== Women's cricket team ===
- Head Coach – Sunetra Paranjpe
- Assistant Coach – Sarvesh Damle
- Physiotherapist – Dr. Kruti S. Suratwala
- Trainer – Swati Patil
