= Gymkhana Ground =

Gymkhana Ground may refer to:

- Central Gymkhana Ground, Indore
- Bombay Gymkhana, a venue for multiple sports including cricket and football
- Gymkhana Ground, a now defunct cricket venue in Rangoon, Burma (today Yangon, Myanmar)
- Gymkhana Ground, Secunderabad, a cricket ground in the Secunderabad, Telangana, established in 1928
- Gymkhana Club Ground, Nairobi
- Poona Gymkhana Ground, Pune
- Deccan Gymkhana Ground, Pune
- Coast Gymkhana Club Ground, Mombasa
- Karachi Gymkhana, Karachi
- Lahore Gymkhana Club, Lahore
- Gymkhana Ground, Bengaluru
- Hindu Gymkhana Ground, Mumbai
- Parsi Gymkhana Ground, Mumbai

== See also ==
- Gymkhana, a typical Anglo-Indian expression, which is derived from the Hindi-Urdu word Jamat-khana, is an Indian term which referred to a place of assembly
