= Gymkhana Club =

Gymkhana Club is the club or gentleman's club associated with gymkhana, a British-colonial term for sports club; many are called simply Gymkhana in short.

- Bombay Gymkhana
- Colombo Gymkhana Club
- Delhi Gymkhana
- Gymkhana Club, Chennai
- Hindu Gymkhana (disambiguation)
- Islam Gymkhana, Mumbai
- Jamalpur Gymkhana
- Jorhat Gymkhana Club
- Karachi Gymkhana Club
- Lahore Gymkhana Club
- Nairobi Gymkhana Club
- Parsi Gymkhana, Marine Drive, Mumbai
- Poona Gymkhana Ground

== See also ==
- Gymkhana (disambiguation)
