= Chiswick Park Cricket Ground =

Cricket ground in Chiswick, London, England

Coordinates: 51.4846°N 0.2714°W

Ground information
- Location: Chiswick, London
- Establishment: 1886

Team information
| CI Thornton's XI | (1886) |
| Middlesex | (1887) |
- As of 2 September 2010; Source: Ground profile

Chiswick Park Cricket Ground was a cricket ground in Chiswick, London (historically Middlesex). The first recorded match on the ground was in 1886, when Chiswick Park played the Parsees during their tour of England.

The first first-class match held on the ground came in 1886 when CI Thornton's XI played the touring Australians. The second and final first-class match held at the ground came in 1887 when Middlesex played Oxford University.

The final recorded match held on the ground came in 1888 when the Gentlemen of West Middlesex played the Parsees during their tour of England. The ground was located to the north of the Hounslow Loop Line and was surrounded to the west by Grove Park Terrace, to the north by Fauconberg Road and to the west by Sutton Court Road. Following the Second World War, the ground was built over, with a primary school and apartments built on it.
