= Parsi Gymkhana =

Parsi Gymkhana may mean:

- Parsi Gymkhana (Marine Drive): A gymkhana located at Marine Drive in Mumbai
- Parsi Gymkhana (Dadar): A gymkhana located at Dadar in Mumbai
- Parsi Gymkhana, Pune: A gymkhana in Pune
- Parsi Gymkhana, Mahabaleshwar: A gymkhana in Mahabaleshwar
- Parsi Gymkhana, Nagpur: A gymkhana in Nagpur
