= Islam Gymkhana =

Islam Gymkhana may mean:

- Islam Gymkhana, Mumbai: A gymkhana in Mumbai
- Rander Islam Gymkhana Ground, Surat: A cricket ground in Surat
