= Wankhede Stadium =

Cricket stadium in Mumbai, India

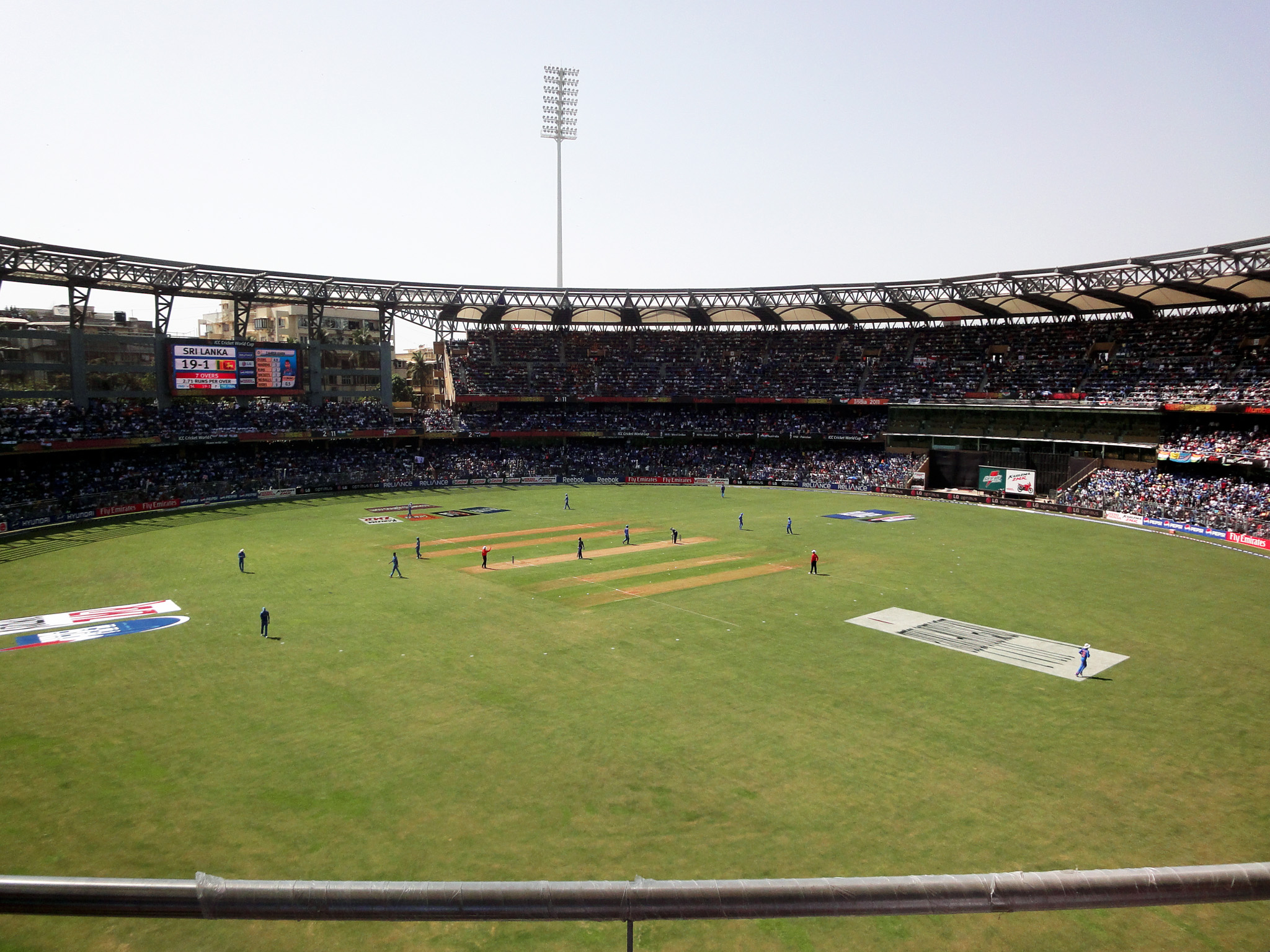
- Wankhede Stadium during the 2011 Cricket World Cup

- Location in Mumbai
- Address: Netaji Subhash Chandra Bose Rd, Churchgate, Mumbai (South), Maharashtra, India; Mumbai; India
- Location: Churchgate, Mumbai, Maharashtra, India
- Coordinates: 18°56′20″N 72°49′33″E
- Owner: Mumbai Cricket Association
- Operator: Mumbai Cricket Association
- Seating type: Stadium seating
- Capacity: 33,100 (2011–present); 39,000 (1974–2010)
- Surface: Grass
- Public transit: at the Churchgate

Construction
- Opened: 1974
- Architects: Shashi Prabhu and Associates (1974), Shashi Prabhu and Associates and P.K. Das and Associates (2017)

Ground information
- Tenants: India national cricket team India women's national cricket team Mumbai cricket team Mumbai Indians; Mumbai Indians
- End names
- Tata End Garware Pavilion End

International information
- First men's Test: 23–29 January 1975: India v West Indies
- Last men's Test: 1–5 November 2024: India v New Zealand
- First men's ODI: 17 January 1987: India v Sri Lanka
- Last men's ODI: 15 November 2023: India v New Zealand
- First men's T20I: 22 December 2012: India v England
- Last men's T20I: 23 February 2026: West Indies v Zimbabwe
- First women's Test: 10–13 February 1984: India v Australia
- Last women's Test: 21–24 December 2023: India v Australia
- First women's ODI: 23 December 1997: Ireland v New Zealand
- Last women's ODI: 2 January 2024: India v Australia
- First women's T20I: 31 March 2016: West Indies v New Zealand
- Last women's T20I: 10 December 2023: India v England
- As of 1 November 2024; Source: Cricinfo

Wankhede Stadium (pronounced [ʋaːnkʰeɖe]) is an international cricket stadium in Mumbai, India. It is owned and operated by the Mumbai Cricket Association and is the home ground of the Mumbai Indians. It houses the headquarters of the Board of Control for Cricket in India, the MCA and the Indian Premier League.It is named after by former BCCI President S. K. Wankhede

The stadium is situated near Marine Drive in the Churchgate neighbourhood. Several old cricket clubs are near the stadium, including Hindu Gymkhana, Parsi Gymkhana and The Cricket Club of India (CCI).

The stadium has been host to numerous high-profile cricket matches in the past, most notably the 2011 Cricket World Cup Final, in which India defeated Sri Lanka and became the first country to win the Cricket World Cup on home soil. It hosted the last match of Sachin Tendulkar's international career.

== History ==
=== Previous stadiums ===
Mumbai has seen Test matches played at three different grounds. The Mumbai Gymkhana ground hosted the first-ever Test in India, in 1933–34 against England. After World War II, the Cricket Club of India's (CCI) Brabourne Stadium – the second ground of the city – was used for 17 Tests.

=== Construction ===
Wankhede Stadium was built after disputes between the CCI, which owns Brabourne Stadium, and the Mumbai Cricket Association (MCA) over the allocation of tickets for cricket matches. This became severe after the Test between India and England in 1973. At the initiative of S. K. Wankhede, a politician and the secretary of the Mumbai Cricket Association, BCA built the new stadium in South Mumbai near the Churchgate station by appointing Shashi Prabhu & Associates as their architects and B.E. Billimoria & Co as the contractors. It was named after Wankhede in 1974. It was built in approximately 13 months and opened in time for the final Test between India and the West Indies in 1975. Since then, Wankhede Stadium has been the main cricketing venue in the city.

Wankhede Stadium staged its first Test in the 1974–75 season when the West Indies toured India; India lost by 201 runs. The Test also featured a crowd disturbance after a fan who rushed onto the ground to greet West Indies player Clive Lloyd was treated roughly by the police. India's first victory at the stadium was against New Zealand two seasons later. The stadium has been a witness to great innings like Sunil Gavaskar's 205 against the West Indies and Alvin Kallicharan's 187 in the same game in the 1978–79 series and all-round heroics like Ian Botham's century and thirteen wickets in the Jubilee Test in 1979–80, which England won by ten wickets. The highest score by an Indian at the Wankhede Stadium is Virat Kohli's 235 against England in 2016–17. Incidentally Ravi Shastri's six sixes in an over off Baroda's Tilak Raj in Ranji Trophy, en route to the fastest double-hundred in first-class cricket were recorded on this ground in 1984–85. His unbeaten 200 in 113 minutes off 123 balls with 13 fours and 13 sixes at this ground is the fastest double century in first-class cricket since the 2017–18 season when Shafiqullah Shafaq scored a double century in 89 balls.

=== Reconstruction ===
Since ICC World Cup Cricket 2011 was to be hosted by India, Bangladesh, and Sri Lanka, and Mumbai was selected to host the final, it was decided to redevelop the Wankhede Stadium to suit the modern facilities and comfort of spectators.

The Managing Committee invited presentations from reputed Architects and shortlisted M/s. P.K. Das & Associates and M/s. Shashi Prabhu & Associates to jointly draw up a project for the redevelopment of the Wankhede Stadium. While redeveloping the Stadium, major changes were at the North end and the South end with better facilities for the spectators in terms of bucket seating, a large number of toilets, and food courts.

While MCA undertook the redevelopment of Wankhede Stadium, the ground was not available for domestic and international cricket until February 2011. To ensure that MCA did not miss out on the turn of Test and ODI matches and also to develop a healthy working relationship with the Cricket Club of India.

One of the highlights of the stadium is the suspended cantilever roofs. The Teflon fabric roof is lighter in weight and heat resistant. There is no beam support for the roof to ensure that the spectators will have a better view. On the roof, there are exhaust fans that suck the hot air from the stands and allow the breeze from the West to flow in. The stadium has 20 elevators for North and South stands.

The stadium has a capacity of 33,108, following renovations for the 2011 Cricket World Cup. Before the upgrade, the capacity was approximately 39,000.

=== World Cup 2023 ===
Wankhede Stadium was proposed to be used as one of the venues for World Cup 2023. The up-gradation of the stadium is currently in works where Shashi Prabhu & Associates have once again been appointed to oversee the restoration of entire outfield. The matches were played in October and November 2023.

=== Pitch ===
The entire square is made of local red soil which gives extra bounce thus making batting slightly easier. The pitch over the years has generally favoured the batters more than the bowlers. However, the pitch came into serious criticism during the 4th test of Border Gavaskar Trophy 2004 where the test match ended in just around two-and-a half days apparently resulting in India's win and was declared a "Minefield" by then Aussies skipper Ricky Ponting as the ball started turning very sharply right from the 1st session of the game. Generally, the pace bowlers get some help off the pitch here with the new ball due to sea-breeze flow along the stadium.

—==Recent tournament results==

=== Cricket World Cup ===
Year	Date	Team #1	Team #2	Round	Result
1987	17 October 1987	India	Zimbabwe	Group Stage	India won by 8 wickets
1987	5 November 1987	India	England	Group Stage	England won by 35 runs
1996	27 February 1996	Australia	India	Group Stage	Australia won by 16 runs
2011	13 March 2011	New Zealand	Canada	Group Stage	New Zealand won by 97 runs
2011	18 March 2011	Sri Lanka	New Zealand	Group Stage	Sri Lanka won by 112 runs
2011	2 April 2011	Sri Lanka	India	Final	India won by 6 wickets
2023	21 October 2023	South Africa	England	Group Stage	South Africa won by 229 runs
2023	24 October 2023	South Africa	Bangladesh	Group Stage	South Africa won by 149 runs
2023	2 November 2023	India	Sri Lanka	Group Stage	India won by 302 runs
2023	7 November 2023	Afghanistan	Australia	Group Stage	Australia won by 3 wickets
2023	15 November 2023	India	New Zealand	Semi-final	India won by 70 runs

=== ICC Men's T20 World Cup ===
Year	Date	Team #1	Team #2	Round	Result
2016	16 March 2016	England	West Indies	Super 10	West Indies won by 6 wickets
2016	18 March 2016	South Africa	England	Super 10	England won by 2 wickets
2016	20 March 2016	South Africa	Afghanistan	Super 10	South Africa won by 37 runs
2016	31 March 2016	India	West Indies	Semi-final	West Indies won by 7 wickets
2026	7 February 2026	India	United States	Group Stage	India won by 29 runs
2026	8 February 2026	England	Nepal	Group Stage	England won by 4 runs
2026	11 February 2026	West Indies	England	Group Stage	West Indies won by 30 runs
2026	12 February 2026	Nepal	Italy	Group Stage	Italy won by 10 wickets
2026	15 February 2026	Nepal	West Indies	Group Stage	West Indies won by 9 wickets
2026	17 February 2026	Scotland	Nepal	Group Stage	Nepal won by 7 wickets
2026	23 February 2026	West Indies	Zimbabwe	Super 8	West Indies won by 107 runs
2026	5 March 2026	India	England	Semi-final	India won by 7 runs

== Cricket World Cup ==
This stadium has hosted 20 One Day International (ODI) matches every time that India has hosted the Cricket World Cup:

=== 1987 Cricket World Cup ===
17 October 1987
Scorecard

India; 136/2 (27.5 overs)	v	Zimbabwe; 135 (44.2 overs)
Dilip Vengsarkar 46*(37); John Traicos 2/27 (8 overs)		Andrew Pycroft 61 (102); Manoj Prabhakar 4/19 (8 overs)

India won by 8 wickets
Umpires: Mahboob Shah and David Shepherd
Player of the match: Manoj Prabhakar

5 November 1987
Scorecard

India; 219 (45.3 overs)	v	England; 254/6 (50 overs)
Mohammad Azharuddin 64 (74); Eddie Hemmings 4/52 (9.3 overs)		Graham Gooch 115 (136); Maninder Singh 3/54 (10 overs)

England won by 35 runs
Umpires: Tony Crafter and Steve Woodward
Player of the match: Graham Gooch

=== 1996 Cricket World Cup ===
27 February 1996
Scorecard

Australia; 258 (50 overs)	v	India; 242 (48 overs)
Mark Waugh 126 (135); Venkatapathy Raju 2/48 (10 overs)		Sachin Tendulkar 90(84); Damien Fleming 5/36 (9 overs)

Australia won by 16 runs
Umpires: Steve Dunne and David Shepherd
Player of the match: Mark Waugh

=== 2011 Cricket World Cup ===
13 March 2011
Scorecard

New Zealand; 358/6 (50 overs)	v	Canada; 261/9 (50 overs)
Brendon McCullum 101(109); Jacob Oram 3/47 (10 overs)		Ashish Bagai 84(87); Harvir Baidwan 3/84 (9.1 overs)

New Zealand won by 97 runs
Umpires: Bruce Oxenford and Shavir Tarapore
Player of the match: Brendon McCullum

18 March 2011
Scorecard

Sri Lanka; 265/9 (50 overs)	v	New Zealand; 153/10 (35 overs)
Kumar Sangakkara 111(128); Muttiah Muralitharan 4/25 (8 overs)		Ross Taylor 33(55); Tim Southee 3/63 (10 overs)

Sri Lanka won by 112 runs
Umpires: Asad Rauf and Richard Kettleborough
Player of the match: Kumar Sangakkara

==== Finals ====
2 April 2011
Scorecard

Sri Lanka; 274/6 (50 overs)	v	India; 277/4 (48.2 overs)
Mahela Jayawardene 103 (88); Yuvraj Singh 2/49 (10 overs)		Gautam Gambhir 97 (122); Lasith Malinga 2/42 (9 overs)

India won by 6 wickets
2011 Cricket World Cup Final
Umpires: Aleem Dar and Simon Taufel
Player of the match: MS Dhoni

- India became the first country to win the Cricket World Cup on home soil at Wankhede stadium.

=== 2023 Cricket World Cup ===
21 October 2023
14:00 (D/N)
Scorecard

South Africa; 399/7 (50 overs)	v	England; 170 (22 overs)
Heinrich Klaasen 109 (67); Reece Topley 3/88 (8.5 overs)		Mark Wood 43 (17); Gerald Coetzee 3/35 (4 overs)

South Africa won by 229 runs
Attendance: 28,033
Umpires: Kumar Dharmasena (SL) and Nitin Menon (Ind)
Player of the match: Heinrich Klaasen

- England won the toss and elected to field.

24 October 2023
14:00 (D/N)
Scorecard

South Africa; 382/5 (50 overs)	v	Bangladesh; 233/10 (46.4 overs)
Quinton de Kock 174 (140); Hasan Mahmud 2/67 (6 overs)		Mahmudullah 111 (111); Gerald Coetzee 3/62 (10 overs)

South Africa won by 149 runs
Umpires: Ahsan Raza (Pak) and Joel Wilson (WI)
Player of the match: Quinton de Kock

- Bangladesh won the toss and elected to field.

2 November 2023
14:00 (D/N)
Scorecard

India; 357/8 (50 overs)	v	Sri Lanka; 55/10 (19.4 overs)
Shubman Gill 92 (92); Dilshan Madushanka 5/80 (10)		Kasun Rajitha 14 (17); Mohammed Shami 5/18 (5)

India won by 302 runs
Umpires: Chris Brown (NZ) and Paul Reiffel (Aus)
Player of the match: Mohammed Shami

- Sri Lanka won the toss and elected to field.
- Dilshan Madushanka (SL) took his first five-wicket haul in ODI.
- Mohammad Shami became the highest wicket-taker for India at the Cricket World Cup, surpassing Zaheer Khan (44 wickets).
- This was India's largest win, in terms of runs, at the Cricket World Cup.
- India qualified for the semi-finals as a result of this match.

7 November 2023
14:00 (D/N)
Scorecard

Afghanistan; 291/5 (50 overs)	v	Australia; 293/7 (46.5 overs)
Ibrahim Zadran 129* (143); Josh Hazlewood 2/39 (9 overs)		Glenn Maxwell 201* (128); Rashid Khan 2/44 (10 overs)

Australia won by 3 wickets
Umpires: Michael Gough (Eng) and Alex Wharf (Eng)
Player of the match: Glenn Maxwell (Aus)

- Afghanistan won the toss and elected to bat
- Ibrahim Zadran (Afg) became the first Afghan batter to score a century at the Cricket World Cup.
- Glenn Maxwell (Aus) scored the highest score (201) at the number 6 position in ODI cricket.
- 202-run stand between Glenn Maxwell and Pat Cummins (Aus) is the highest 8th wicket partnership in ODIs.
- Glenn Maxwell (Aus) became the first Australian cricketer to score a double century in ODIs.
- Glenn Maxwell (Aus) also made the highest individual score batting second in ODIs.
- Australia qualified for the semi-finals as a result of this match.

==== Semi-final ====
15 November 2023
14:00 (D/N)
Scorecard

India; 397/4 (50 overs)	v	New Zealand; 327 (48.5 overs)
Virat Kohli 117 (113); Tim Southee 3/100 (10 overs)		Daryl Mitchell 134 (119); Mohammed Shami 7/57 (9.5 overs)

India won by 70 runs
Umpires: Richard Illingworth (Eng) and Rod Tucker (Aus)
Player of the match: Mohammed Shami (Ind)

- India won the toss and chose to bat
- Mohammed Shami and Kuldeep Yadav (Ind) both played their 100th ODI.
- Mohammed Shami's 7/57 were the best bowling figures for India in ODIs, surpassing Stuart Binny's 6/4; in World Cups, surpassing Ashish Nehra's 6/23 in 2003; and in ODIs vs New Zealand, surpassing Amit Mishra's 5/18. He also surpassed Mitchell Starc to become the quickest to reach 50 wickets in World Cups, in terms of innings (17).
- Virat Kohli (Ind) broke Sachin Tendulkar's records of 49 and 673 for the most centuries in ODIs (50) and most runs in a single edition of the World Cup respectively (711).
- India overtook New Zealand's 393 in 2015 for the highest total in a World Cup knockout stage match (397).
- As a result of this match, India qualified for the finals of the World Cup for the fourth time, after 1983, 2003 and 2011.

== Other events ==
- In 2014, the swearing-in ceremony of current Maharashtra chief minister Devendra Fadnavis was held inside this arena.

== Records and statistics ==
=== Test records ===
- Highest total: 631-all out by India against England in the 2016/17 season.
- Lowest total: 62 by New Zealand against India in the 2021/22 season.
- The highest partnership at the Wankhede Stadium is 298 by DB Vengsarkar and RJ Shastri for India against Australia in the 1986/87 season.
- Sunil Gavaskar (1122 runs) has scored the most Test runs, followed by Sachin Tendulkar (921) and Dilip Vengsarkar (631).
- R Ashwin (41 wickets), Anil Kumble (38 wickets), and Kapil Dev (28)

=== ODI records ===
- Highest total: 438/4 by South Africa against India in the 2015 One Day International Series, then 397/4 by India in 2023 ODI World cup Semi-finals, 358/6 by New Zealand, 357/8 by India against Sri Lanka in 2023 ODI World Cup, 327/10 New Zealand vs India, 299/4 by India and Sri Lanka 289/7.
- Lowest total: 55 all out by Sri Lanka against India in the 2023 season.
- Virat Kohli (474 runs) has scored the most ODI runs, followed by Sachin Tendulkar (455) and Mohammad Azharuddin (302).
- Mohammed Shami, Venkatesh Prasad (15 wickets each) and Anil Kumble (12).

=== T20I records ===
- Highest total: 253/7 by India against England on 5 March 2026.
- Lowest total: 135/7 by Sri Lanka against India on 24 December 2017(3rd match in 3 match t20 series).
- Virat Kohli of India (197) has scored the most runs, followed by RG Sharma of India (165), and by Abhishek Sharma of India (135).

=== Stands ===
- MCA Stand
- MCA Stand
- Rohit Sharma Stand
- North Stand
- MCA Stand
- MCA Stand
- Sachin Tendulkar Stand
- Garware Stand
- Grand Stand
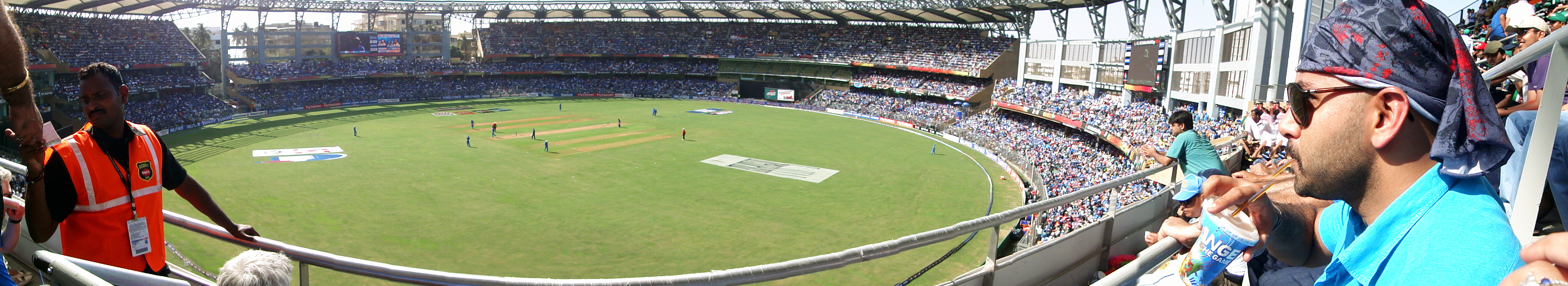
Panoramic shot of Wankhede Stadium during the 2011 Cricket World Cup Final between Sri Lanka and India.

== Gallery ==
=== Before renovation ===
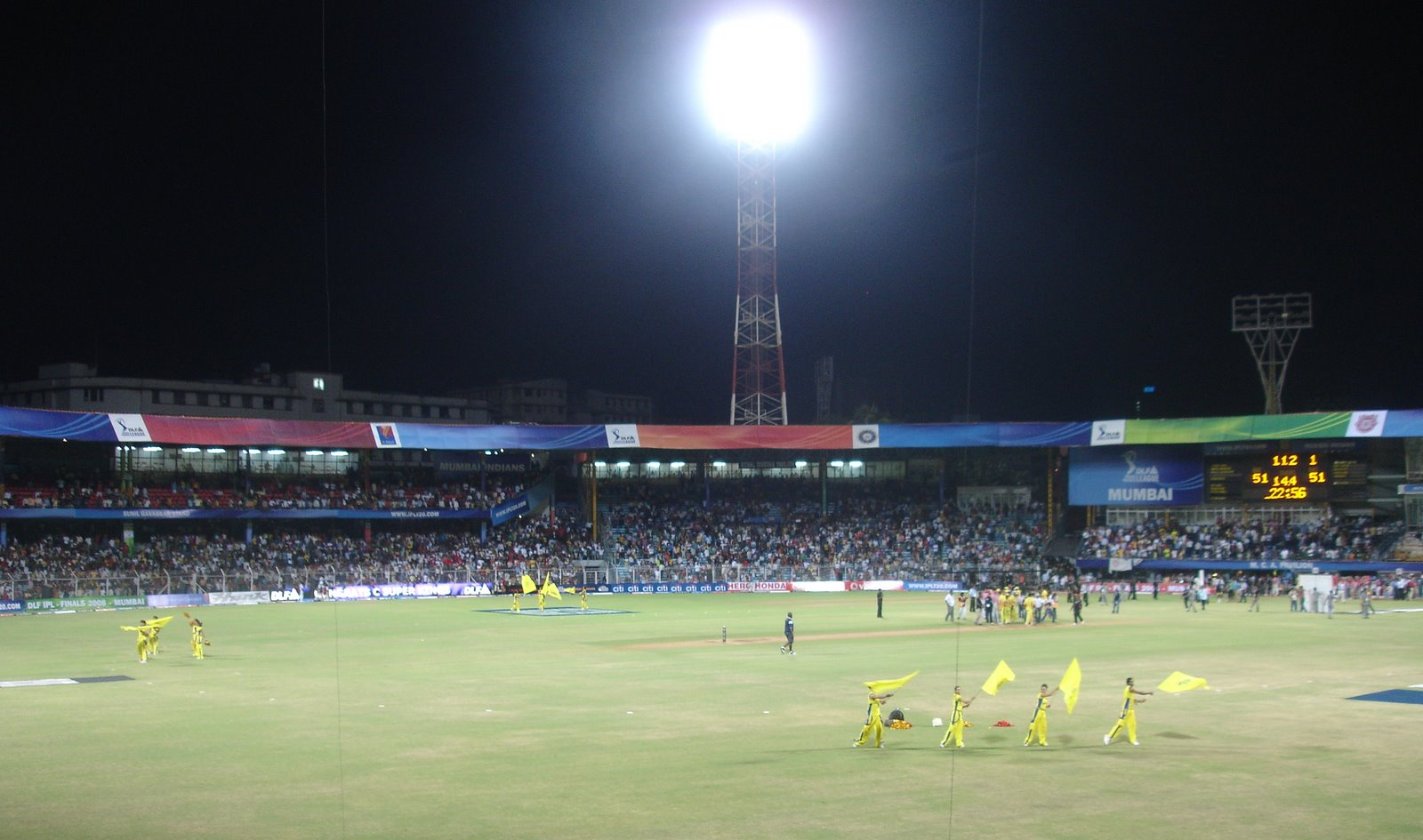
Chennai Super Kings Wins Vs Kings XI Punjab at Wankhede in old structure

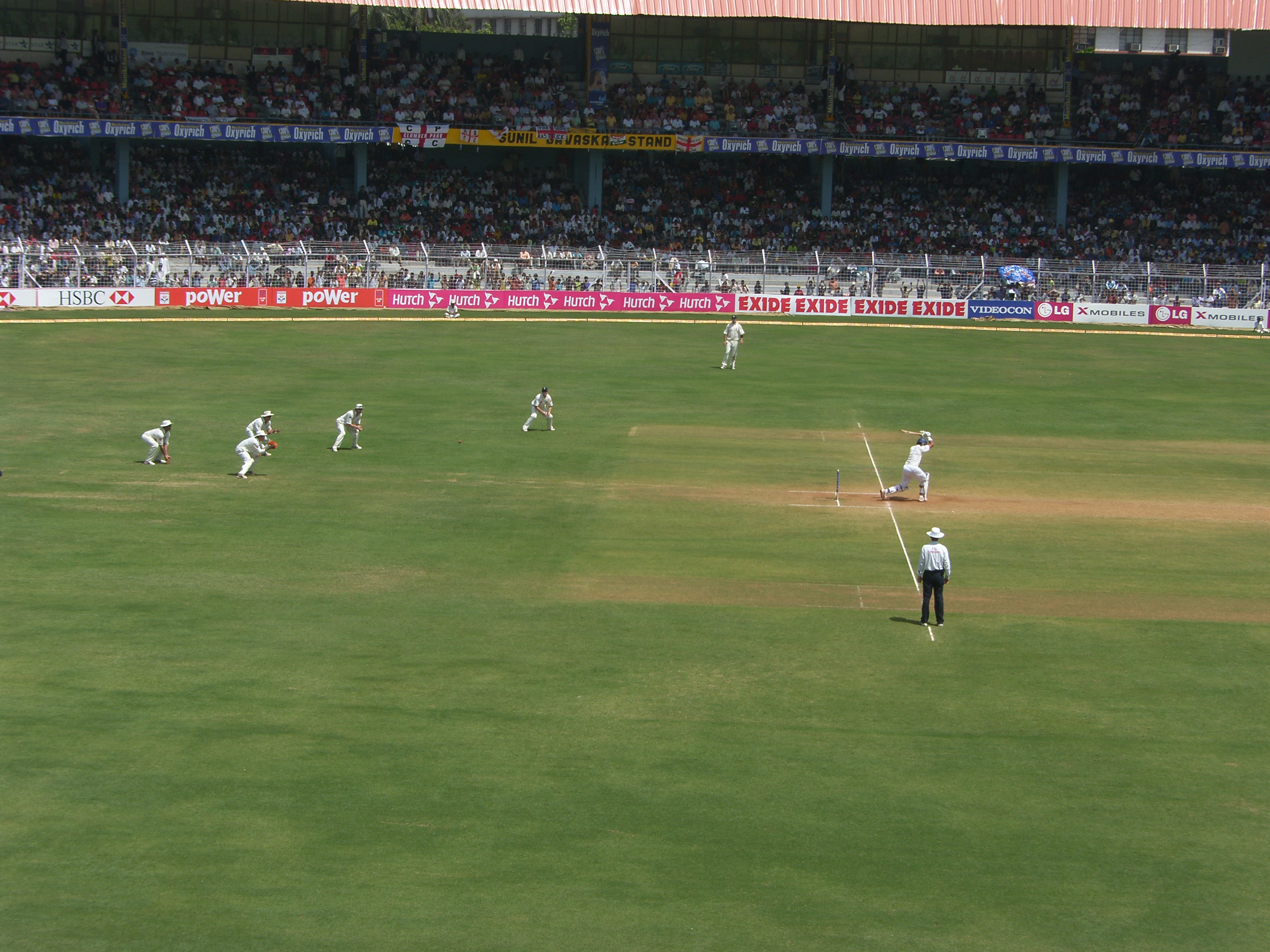
The stadium in 2006 during Test match in old structure.

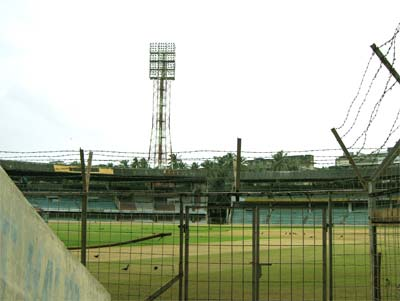
Before renovation - stands, floodlight tower from a spectator view from one of the stands.

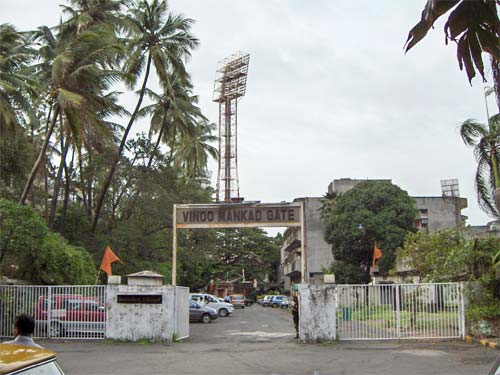
Old entrance of the stadium

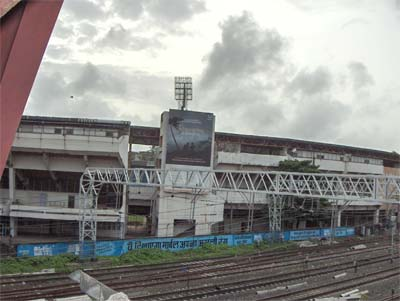
Before renovation, from the railway lines next to the stadium

=== After renovation ===
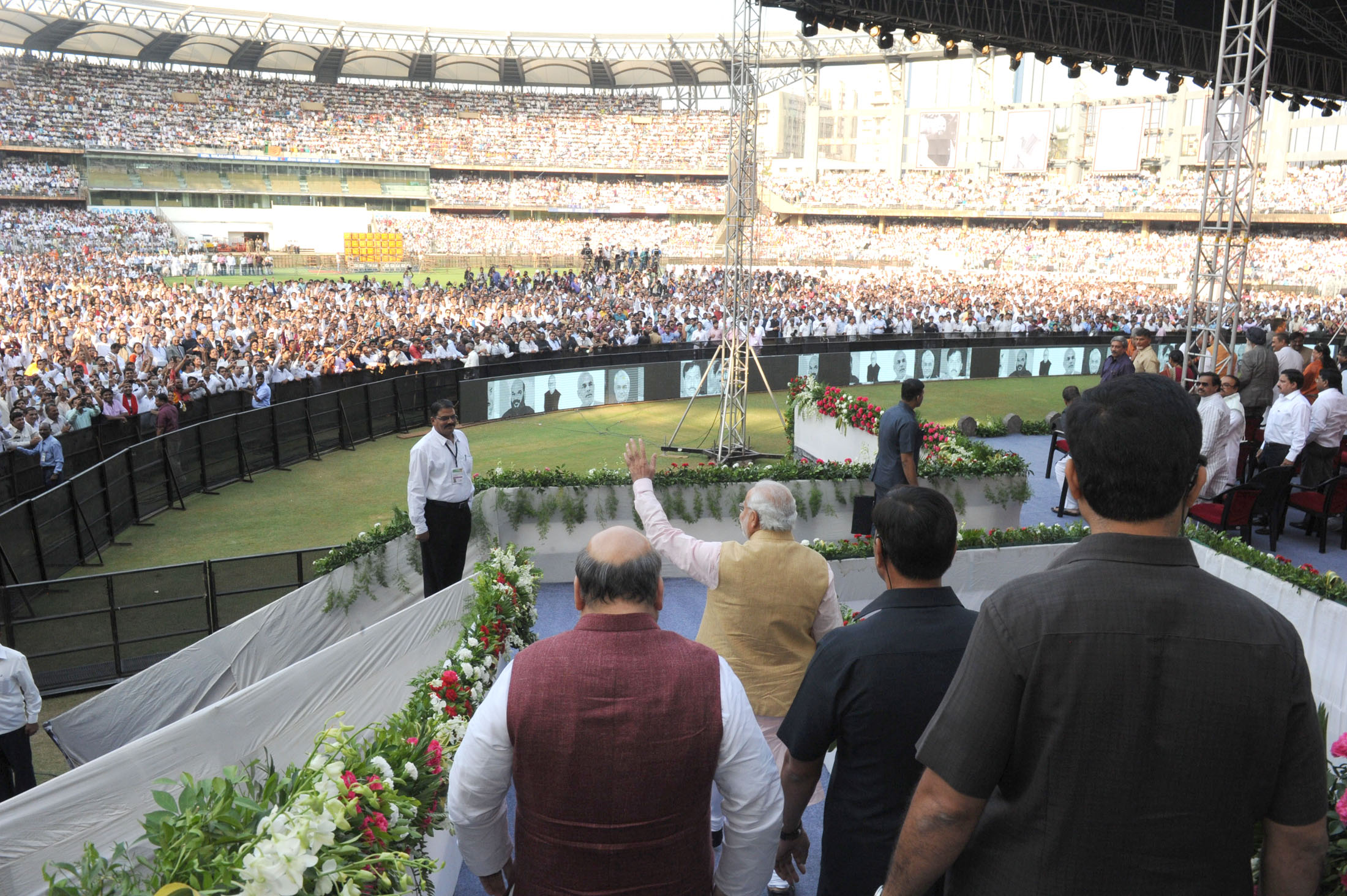
Prime Minister Narendra Modi in the arena in October 2014 during Maharashtra gov swearing-in.

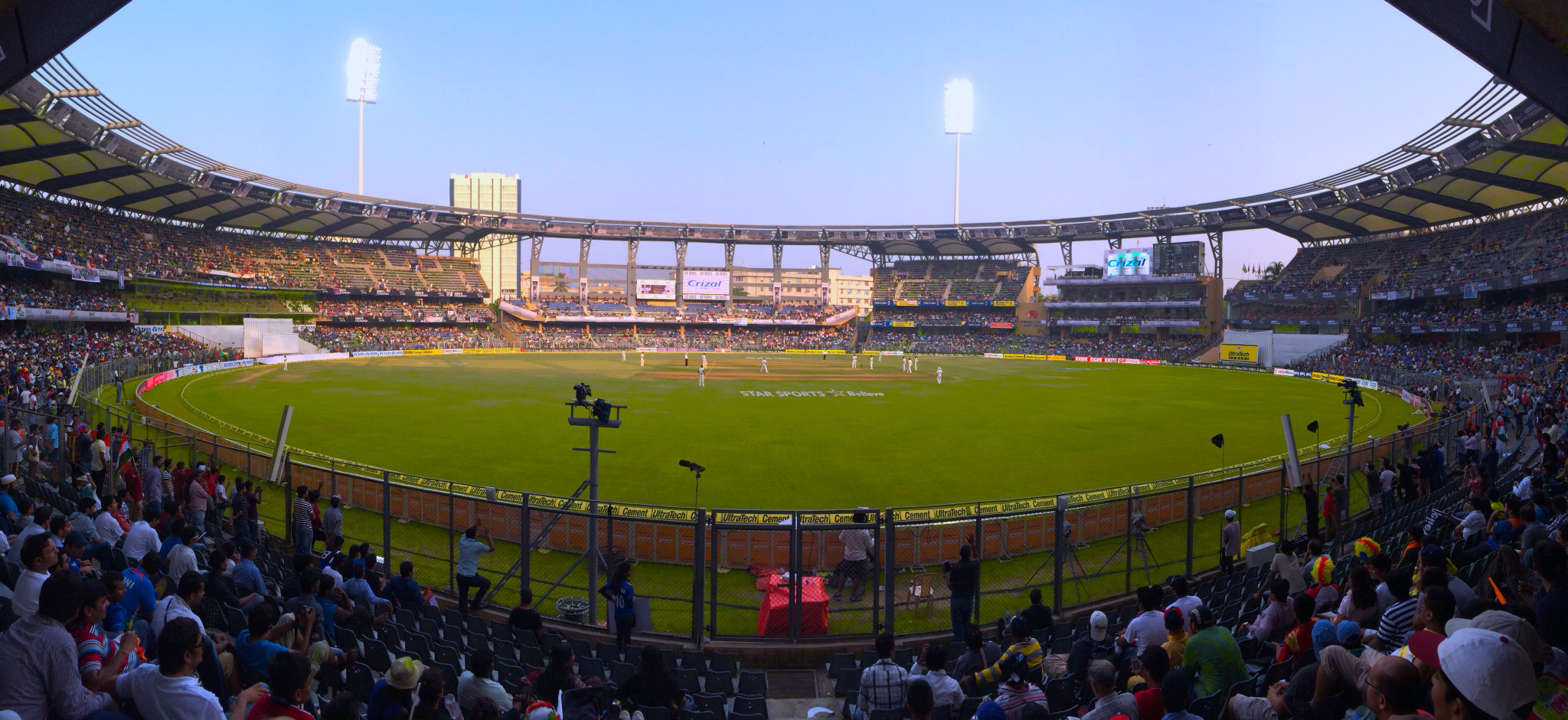
Panoramic view of the stadium after renovation.

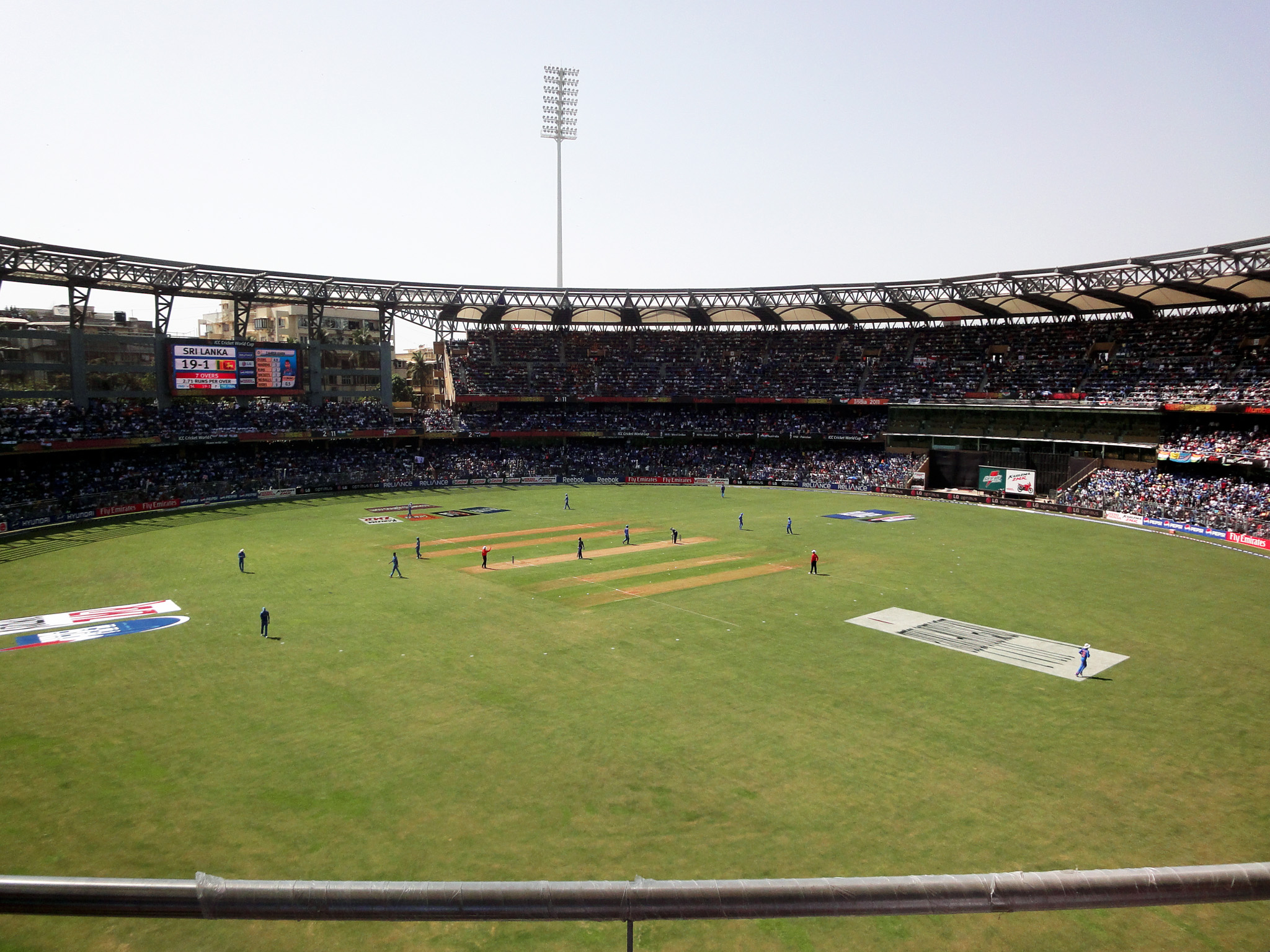
Stadium during the first innings of the 2011 Cricket World Cup final between Sri Lanka and India.

== See also ==
- Lists of stadiums
- List of international cricket grounds in India

Events and tenants
Preceded by Kensington Oval	Cricket World Cup; Final Venue; 2011	Succeeded by MCG
