= Hindu Gymkhana Ground =

Sports venue in Mumbai, Maharashtra, India

PJ Hindu Gymkhana Ground
- Interactive map of PJ Hindu Gymkhana Ground
- Full name: PJ Hindu Gymkhana Ground
- Location: Marine Drive, Mumbai, Maharashtra
- Coordinates: 18.9466993°N 72.820985°E
- Owner: Hindu Gymkhana
- Operator: Hindu Gymkhana
- Capacity: 5,000

Construction
- Groundbreaking: 1878
- Opened: 1878

Website
- CricketArchive

PJ Hindu Gymkhana Ground is a multi purpose club ground in Marine Drive, Mumbai, Maharashtra. The ground is mainly used for organizing matches of football, cricket and other sports.

The gymkhana ground itself was inaugurated by then Governor of Bombay, Lord Harris on 5 May 1894. At that time it was located on Marine Lines, which was the only access route as Marine Drive was yet to be reclaimed.

Hindu Gymkhana was responsible for fielding the Hindus cricket team in the Bombay Quadrangular and its successor Bombay Pentangular cricket tournaments. The gymkhana is one of the founder members of the Bombay Cricket Association. Hindu Gymkhana organises several tournaments such as Purshottam Shield Cricket Tournament, which started in 1912, making it the oldest tournament that the club organises.

The Gymkhana has been identified as a Heritage Grade IIA structure. As the gymkhana land belongs to the collector, one of its lease conditions is that the grounds should be accessible by the general public and non-sporting activities.

Sachin Tendulkar gave his first television interview to Tom Alter at the Hindu Gymkhana grounds. Indian Batsman Eknath Solkar was the son of a groundsman at Hindu Gymkana.
