= Pestonji =

Pestonji is both a given name and a surname. Notable people with the name include:

- Pestonji Bomanji (1851–1938), Indian painter
- Pestonji Kanga, Indian cricketer
- Marzi Pestonji (born 1979), Indian dancer
- Meher Pestonji, Indian social worker
- Rattana Pestonji, Thai film director
- Jahangir Pestonji Khambhata (1856–1916), Indian actor
