= M. E. Pavri =

Indian cricketer (1866–1946)

M.E. Pavri
Personal information
- Full name: Mehallasha Edulji Pavri
- Born: 10 October 1866; Navsari, Gujarat, India
- Died: 19 April 1946 (aged 79); Bombay, India
- Batting: Right-handed
- Bowling: Right-arm fast
- Role: Bowler

Domestic team information
- Years: Team
- 1892-1913: Parsees
- 1892: All-India XI
- 1893: Middlesex

Career statistics
Competition	First-class
Matches	26
Runs scored	589
Batting average	15.50
100s/50s	0/1
Top score	69
Balls bowled	2,014
Wickets	44
Bowling average	20.25
5 wickets in innings	2
10 wickets in match	0
Best bowling	6/36
Catches/stumpings	19/0
- Source: ESPNcricinfo, 5 November 2012

Mehallasha Edulji Pavri (10 October 1866 – 19 April 1946 in Navsari, Gujarat, India) was an Indian cricketer born to a Parsi family, who played 26 first-class matches between 1892 and 1913. He was India's earliest genuine fast bowlers in its pre-Test era. He was a right-handed batsman and a right-arm fast bowler. Most of his first-class cricket was for the Parsees, but he also represented an All-India XI and Middlesex several times.

== Career ==
Pavri made his debut on the Parsee tour to England in 1888, gaining recognition by taking 170 wickets at an average of 11.66. The touring team had played 31 matches of which they won 8 and drew 12.

Performances in other notable matches include the Parsees vs Lord Hawke's XI in 1890 which resulted in a narrow Parsi victory. The match was considered as the Cricket Championship of India at that time, and Pavri took 2 wickets for 3 runs in 3 overs and 7/34 in 13.2 overs. The Parsis won match by 4 wickets. In another match against Lord Hawke's XI and in a 109-run Parsi win, he took figures of 2/18 and 6/36. He also represented an All-India XI against Lord Hawke's XI in 1892.

Pavri was a consistent and prolific wicket-taking attacking bowler, and a decent bat who played in the middle order and had a top first-class score of 69. He was successful in the early years of the Bombay Pentangular Tournament.

Outside cricket, Pavri was a doctor who had studied medicine in London. After retirement from cricket, he not only worked as a doctor but also wrote a book on Indian cricket, Parsi Cricket (1901) which analysed almost every important aspect of Indian cricket at that time with many suggested improvements.

== In popular culture ==
The 2022 web series Rocket Boys starred Basant Mody as M. E. Pavri in a brief appearance.
