= Anant Solkar =

Indian cricketer (1951–2024)

Personal information
- Full name: Anant Dhondu Solkar
- Born: 19 September 1951; Pawas, Bombay State, India
- Died: 26 May 2024 (aged 72); Bandra, Mumbai, Maharashtra, India
- Batting: Right-handed
- Bowling: Right-arm off break
- Relatives: Eknath Solkar (brother)

Domestic team information
- Years: Team
- 1972/73–1975/76: Railways
- 1976/77–1980/81: Maharashtra

Career statistics
Competition	First-class
Matches	26
Runs scored	628
Batting average	18.47
100s/50s	0/1
Top score	84*
Balls bowled	3,209
Wickets	63
Bowling average	23.96
5 wickets in innings	3
10 wickets in match	0
Best bowling	8/100
Catches/stumpings	30/–
- Source: ESPNcricinfo, 18 March 2016

Anant Dhondu Solkar (19 September 1951 – 26 May 2024) was an Indian first-class cricketer. He was the younger brother of Test cricketer Eknath Solkar.

== Life and career ==
Born on 19 September 1951 in Pawas, Maharashtra, Solkar played as a bowling all-rounder who batted right-handed and bowled off spin. He had five siblings (including Eknath Solkar) and his father was a groundsman at the Hindu Gymkhana in Bombay. In a Harris Shield match in 1968, he scored 396 and took 6/28. This is regarded as the best all-round performance in school cricket. He made his first-class debut in the 1972/73 season for Railways and, in the same season, registered his career-best bowling figures of 8/100 in a Ranji match against Delhi. He switched to his home state team Maharashtra in the 1976/77 season and represented it for five seasons. After getting dropped from the team, he quit playing cricket on the advice of his elder brother Eknath Solkar. He finished with 26 first-class appearances in which he took 63 wickets at an average of 23.96.

After his cricket career, Solkar became an alcohol addict. He recollects, "I don’t know what happened. There was nothing left in my life after cricket. I was slowly becoming addicted to it. My day would start and end with it." In 1986, his 15-year-old daughter died of blood cancer. Solkar, who was employed with Tata Electric, quit his job in 1987. He came out of his alcohol addiction in 2007, and worked as an umpire in local matches between 2001 and 2009. He then started to coach young cricketers free of cost in Mumbai.

Solkar died on 26 May 2024, at the age of 72.
