= Gymkhana (disambiguation) =

Gymkhana are social and sporting clubs in India and other Asian countries.

Gymkhana may also refer to:

- Gymkhana (equestrian), an equestrian competition
- Gymkhana (motorsport), an event also known as "car rodeo"
- Gymkhana (motorcycle), a motorcycle time trial around cones on a paved area
- Gymkhana (restaurant), in London and Las Vegas

== See also ==
- Gymkhana Club (disambiguation)
