= St Davids Society of Singapore =

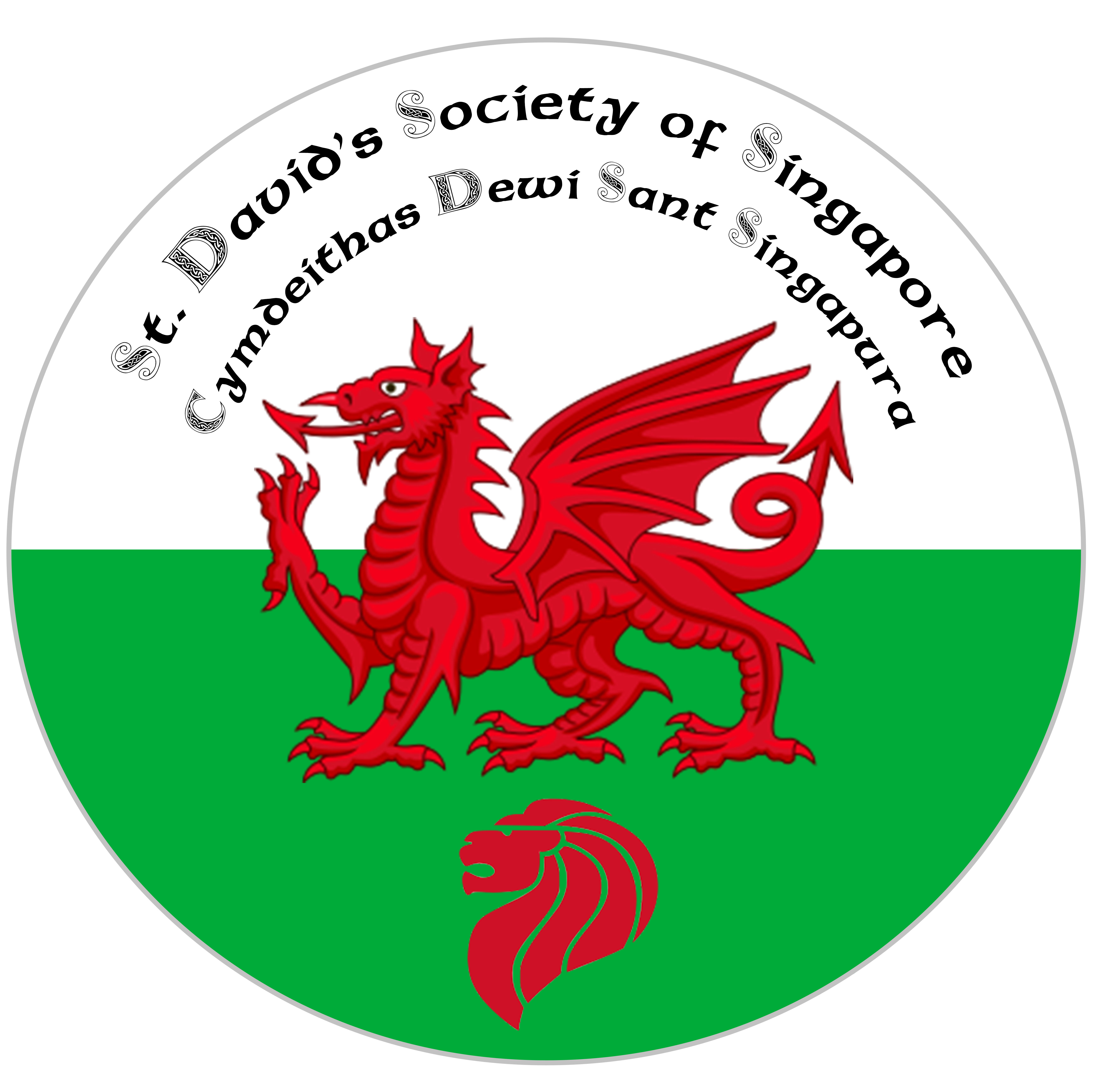
St Davids Society of Singapore

The St Davids Society of Singapore (Welsh: Cymdeithas Dewi Sant Singapura; Malay: Persatuan Daud Yang Suci di Singapura) was established for the purpose of bringing together Welsh people with others who wish to further Welsh culture, and to commemorate each year, in loyal manner the death of their National Patron Saint. The Welsh community in Singapore have celebrated the feast of St David since at least 1912 with the earliest mention in the Straits Times that the Welsh community marked the occasion at the Grand Hotel de L’Europe.

== History ==
The St Davids Society of Singapore has been listed with the Singapore Registry of Societies since 11 November 1961.

As of 1911, the society was not formed but during the celebration of St David on 1 March 1912, D. Y. Perkins expressed the wish to form a St Davids Society in Singapore.

Early celebrations were reported in 1929 of a "fancy gymkhana" for troops on the upper Rugby ground, Tanglin Barracks to commemorate St David's Day in Singapore. The Gymkhana was held by members of the 2nd Bt. the Welch Regiment and consisted of "rugby, association, and hockey matches to be played in fancy dress."

In 1950, the society held their first Annual Reception since the liberation of Singapore at the Singapore Cricket Club Roof Garden on 14 November with the Governor of Singapore Sir Franklin Gimson in attendance. By 1952, the Welsh community held a St. David's day ceremony when Padre Lt.-Col. B. W. M. Price, President of the St. David's Society of Singapore laid a wreath on the Cenotaph on Connaught Drive in memory of all Welshmen who fell in the two world wars. Men from the three services and Welsh business attended the ceremony and a formal dinner was held that night at the Adelphi Hotel for St. David's Day."
