= Parsis cricket team =

Cricket team in Mumbai, India

- Nickname: Parsees

Personnel
- Owner: Parsi Gymkhana

Team information
- City: Mumbai
- Founded: 1877
- Home ground: Parsi Gymkhana Ground

History
- Bombay tournament wins: 10
- Official website: www.parseegymkhana.in

The Parsis (a.k.a. Parsees) cricket team was an Indian first-class cricket team which took part in the annual Bombay tournament. The team was founded by members of the Zoroastrian community in Bombay. It is affiliated to Mumbai Cricket Association.

Many players of Parsis cricket team played for Mumbai cricket team as well as India national cricket team.

== Bombay Quadrangular ==
The Parsis competed in the Bombay tournament from its outset in 1877, when they challenged the Europeans cricket team at the Bombay Gymkhana to a two-day match. At this time, the competition was known as the Presidency Match. It was recognised as a first-class tournament from 1892–93 until its final staging in 1945–46. The Parsis won the first-class tournament outright 10 times, and shared victory 11 times.

== Tours of England ==
The Parsis made two tours of England in the 1880s, though none of the matches have been recognised as first-class. See: Parsis cricket team in England in 1886 and Parsis cricket team in England in 1888.

== Notable players ==
Following is the list of notable players who played or playing for Parsi cricket team/Parsi Gymkhana :

- Polly Umrigar
- Farokh Engineer
- Suryakumar Yadav

== Sources ==
- Vasant Raiji, India's Hambledon Men, Tyeby Press, 1986
- Mihir Bose, A History of Indian Cricket, Andre-Deutsch, 1990
- Ramachandra Guha, A Corner of a Foreign Field – An Indian History of a British Sport, Picador, 2001
