= Robert Henderson (Welsh cricketer) =

Welsh cricketer

Robert Henderson (30 March 1865 – 28 January 1931) was a Welsh cricketer, a right-hand batsman and right-arm slow bowler.

== Brilliant debut season in 1883 ==
Born in Newport, South Wales, Henderson made his first-class debut for Surrey in 1883, and played in all but one of the county's games that season, making over 500 first-class runs. He also took 35 wickets, including 6-17 (which was to remain his career best) against Gloucestershire.

However, he then became ill and hardly played for three seasons. He went to India in 1885-86 to coach the Parsi cricketers in Bombay, and when the Parsis toured England in 1886 he again acted as their coach.

== Return to the game ==
On his return to playing in 1887, Henderson bowled far less and played generally as a specialist batsman, but nevertheless again established himself in the Surrey side, being capped the following year.

In 1889 he again topped 500 first-class runs, and made several vital half-centuries; he was one of nine Wisden Cricketers of the Year in the Almanack's 1890 edition. 1891 saw him make his only century, scoring 106 against Somerset, and the next year he was selected for the Players against the Gentlemen at Lord's.

== Later career ==
After the 1893 season, Henderson played little for his county and did not bowl at all, but he continued to appear occasionally until 1896.

He also stood as an umpire on three occasions, all before the end of his playing career, including the 1895 and 1896 Gentlemen v Players games.

He died at the age of 65 in Wallington, Surrey.
