= Shashi Prabhu =

Indian Architect (born 1944)

- Born: 1944 (age 81–82); Mumbai, Maharashtra, India
- Occupation: Architect

Shashi Prabhu (born 1944) is an Indian Architect whose company, Shashi Prabhu & Associates, has designed sports complexes, hospitals, club houses and infrastructure projects (Like nuclear reactors)throughout India.

== Early life ==
Prabhu was born in Mumbai in 1944 and graduated in architecture from The Chandra School of Arts in 1969. After completing his schooling at the Balmohan Vidya Mandir, he joined the Poddar College of Science .

== Projects ==
His designs include:

- Wankhede Stadium in Mumbai (which has hosted numerous famous cricket matches) and also hosted the 2011 Cricket World Cup Final.
- The Sports City in Hyderabad (which was a venue for the 2002 National Games of India and the 2003 Afro-Asian Games
- Shree Shiv Chhatrapati Sports Complex in Balewadi, which hosted the National Games in 1995 and the Youth Commonwealth Games in 2008.
