= Hindu Gymkhana =

Hindu Gymkhana may mean:

- Hindu Gymkhana, Karachi, a gymkhana in Karachi
- Hindu Gymkhana, Mumbai, a gymkhana in Mumbai
- Hindu Gymkhana, Pune, a gymkhana in Pune
