= Pestonji Kanga =

Indian cricketer

Pestonji D Kanga was a Mumbai-based Parsee cricketer. Kanga was an all-rounder, good with the bat, a fast-bowler with variety. He was part of the Parsi team that toured England in 1888. The 1939 book Parsi Lustre on Indian Soil: Volume 2, compiled by Hormusji Dhunjishaw Darukhanawala, reported: "Mr. Pestonjee Kanga was a keen golfer and an enthusiastic Rotarian. Hygiene was his hobby and in 1907 he wrote a book entitled ' Reflections on Plague and the Methods of Checking It'."
