= Young Zoroastrian Club =

The Young Zoroastrian Club was a cricket club formed by the Parsee community in Mumbai (then Bombay) in 1850. The club was founded by Hiraji Gosta, also known as Kuka Daru, with financial support from the Tatas and Wadia corporate houses.
