= Coast Gymkhana Club Ground =

Cricket ground in Mombasa, Kenya

Coordinates: 4°03′54.45″S 39°40′10.32″E

- Interactive map of Coast Gymkhana Club Ground

Ground information
- Location: Mombasa, Kenya
- Country: Kenya
- Establishment: 1999 (first recorded match)

Team information
Kenya	(2010)
- As of 18 October 2011; Source: Ground profile

Coast Gymkhana Club Ground is a cricket ground in Mombasa, Kenya. The first recorded match held on the ground came in 1999 when a Coast Cricket Association XI played the touring Marylebone Cricket Club. The ground held its first List A match in 2010 when Kenya played the United Arab Emirates. Kenya won the match by 24 runs.

The ground is owned by the Coast Gymkhana Club. The club is located roughly a hundred metres from the Mombasa Sports Club, which has hosted One Day Internationals.
