= Marine Lines =

- Subdistrict
- Location within Mumbai
- Coordinates: 18.9447°N 72.8244°E
- Country: India
- State: Maharashtra
- District: Mumbai City
- City: Mumbai

Government
  - Type: Municipal Corporation
  - Body: Brihanmumbai Municipal Corporation (MCGM)
- Elevation: 10 m (33 ft)

Languages
  - Official: Marathi
- Time zone: UTC+5:30 (IST)
- PIN: 400020
- Area code: 022
- Vehicle registration: MH 01
- Civic agency: MCGM

Marine Lines is a locality in South Mumbai. The name Marine Lines is derived from the Marine Battalion Lines, a military establishment built by the British in the 19th century. The battalion was later converted into an air force residential quarters, and now lies just south of the Metro Adlabs. It is also the name of a railway station on the Mumbai suburban railway on the Western Railway railway line. Marine Lines was also the name of the road on which the Bombay Hospital and the Liberty Cinema stand. It is now known as V. Thackersey Marg. Marine Drive is the famous promenade near the station. Marine Drive has one of the finest Art Deco Residential Buildings facing the sea. Built in 1951, it is India's oldest aquarium and is named after the Parsi entrepreneur D.B. Taraporewala, who provided funds for its development. Marine Drive is one of the greatest sites to see the monsoon in Mumbai if you're travelling during the rainy season.

Near the station, there is a Muslim cemetery and a municipal crematorium, Chandanwadi. Adjoining the station is the famous Marine Drive flyover, the only link to Marine Drive over the tracks from Princess Street beginning to end. Marine Drive/Marine lines is also known as the Queen's Necklace, because the street lights resemble a string of pearls in a necklace when viewed at night from an elevated location anywhere along the drive. Signage makes the UNESCO tag visible at Marine Drive

== Schools and colleges ==
- St. Xavier's College, Bombay

== Gallery ==
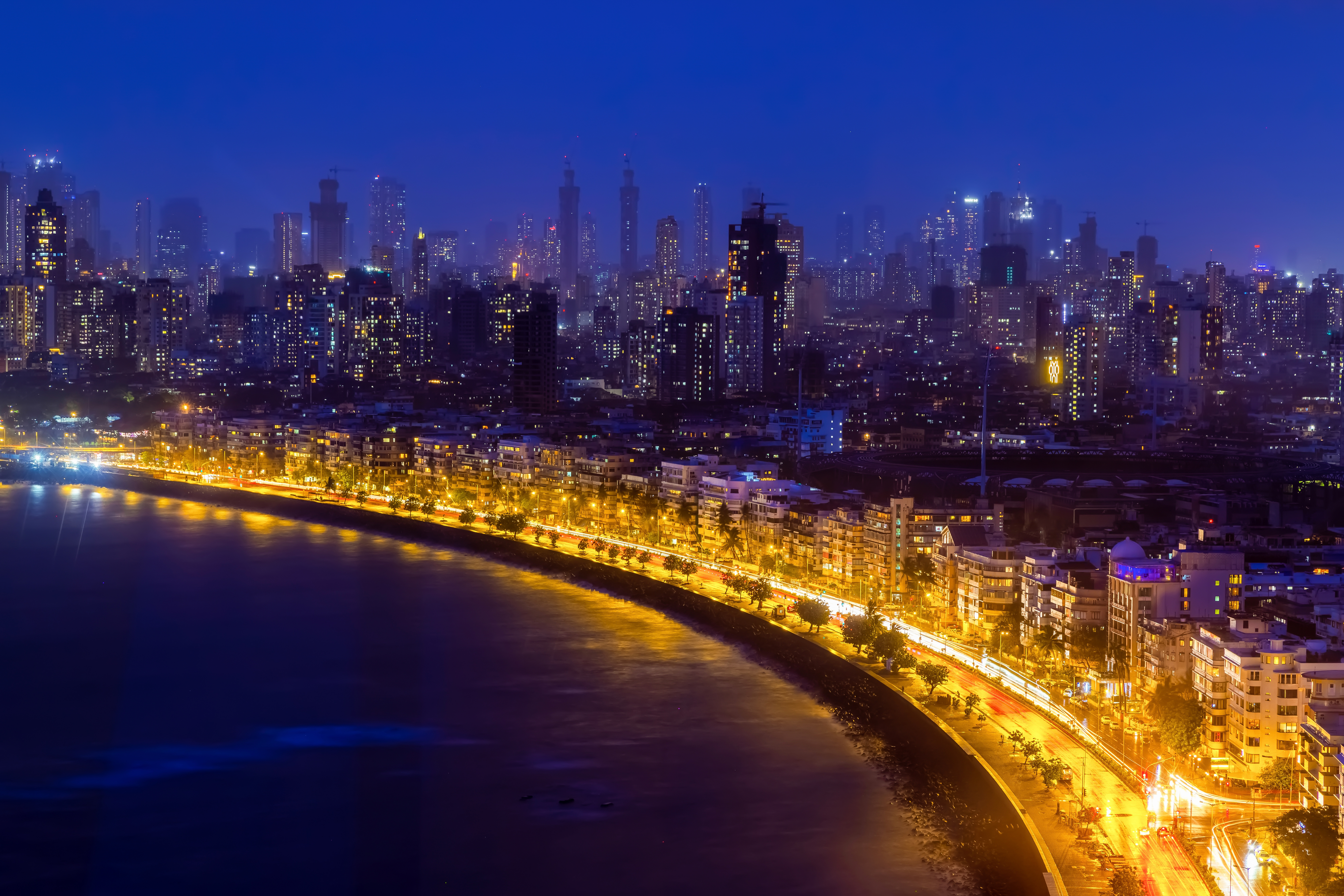
Marine Drive during dusk

== See also ==
List of city districts by population density
