= Marine Drive, Mumbai =

Marine Drive Queen's Necklace
- Promenade
- Location in Mumbai
- Coordinates: 18.944°N 72.823°E
- Country: India
- State: Maharashtra
- District: Mumbai City
- City: Mumbai (Bombay)

Government
  - Type: Municipal Corporation
  - Body: Brihanmumbai Municipal Corporation (MCGM)

Languages
  - Official: Marathi
- Time zone: UTC+5:30 (IST)

Marine Drive, often referred to as the Queen's Necklace, is a 3-kilometre-long promenade along the Netaji Subhash Chandra Bose Road in Mumbai (Bombay), India. The road and promenade were constructed by Pallonji Mistry in 1940. It is a banana-shaped, six-lane concrete road along the coast of a natural bay. At the northern end of Marine Drive is Girgaon Chowpatty, and the adjacent road links Nariman Point at the southern tip to Babulnath and Malabar Hill at the northern tip. Marine Drive is situated on reclaimed land facing west-south-west. Marine Drive is known as the Queen's Necklace because, when viewed at night from above, the streetlights resemble a string of pearls in a necklace.

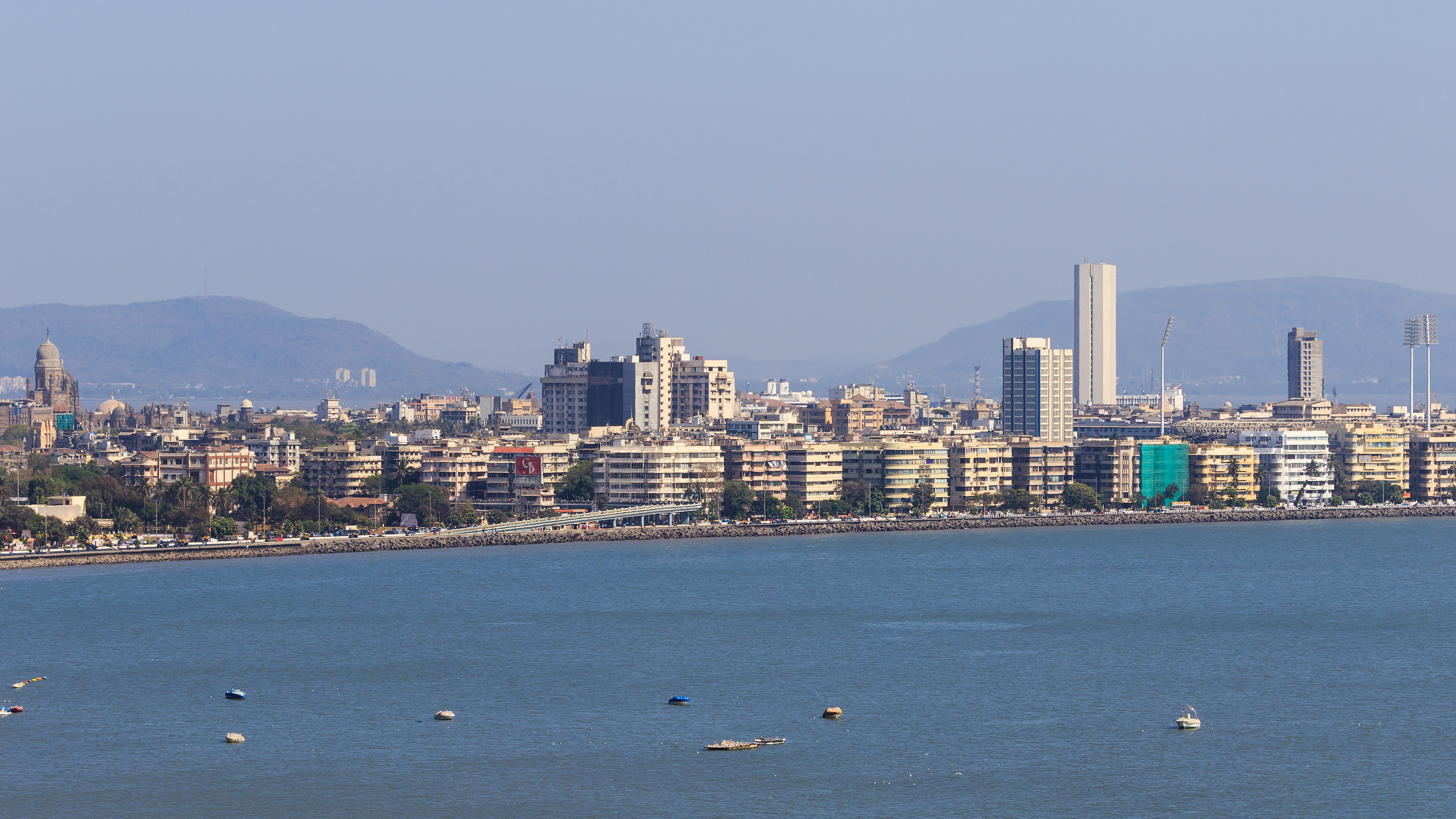
Marine Drive from Malabar Hills

The official name for this road, though rarely used, is Netaji Subhash Chandra Bose Road. The promenade is lined with palm trees. At the northern end of Marine Drive is Chowpatty Beach. This is a popular beach famed for its Bhel Puri (local fast food). Many restaurants also line this stretch of the road. Further down the road lies Walkeshwar, a wealthy neighborhood of the city, and also home to the Governor of Maharashtra.

Most of the buildings erected by wealthy Parsis were constructed in an art deco style, which was popular in the 1920s and 1930s. Among the earliest art deco buildings on Marine Drive were the Kapur Mahal, Zaver Mahal, and Keval Mahal, which are also part of the UNESCO World Heritage Site -the Victorian Gothic & Art Deco Ensembles of Mumbai. These buildings were constructed between 1937 and 1939 for a total cost of 1 million rupees.

Real estate prices along the esplanade are high. Many hotels dot the drive, most prominent among them being the 5-star Oberoi (formerly the Oberoi Hilton Tower, however, reverted to the original name as of early 2008), the intercontinental, Hotel Marine Plaza, Sea Green Hotel and a few smaller hotels. Marine Drive is the preferred connecting road between the central business district located at Nariman Point and the rest of the city.

Many sports clubs, some cricket stadiums and club grounds are situated along the stretch of Marine Drive, including members-only clubs like the Cricket Club of India (CCI), adjoining the Brabourne Stadium, Hindu Gymkhana Ground and Garware Club House, adjacent to the famous Wankhede Stadium, as well as others like the Mumbai Police Gymkhana, Hindu Gymkhana, Parsi Gymkhana and Islam Gymkhana.

A well known actress and singer from the 1950s, Suraiya lived in a building on the stretch known as 'Krishna Mahal' in the ground-floor apartment (as a tenant of Shah family) from the 1940s until her death on 31 January 2004. The house was first rented by her mother, Mumtaz Begum. Many other film stars, such as Nargis and Raj Kapoor, lived nearby in the 1940s and 50s.

In 2012, the Municipal Corporation of Greater Mumbai announced that the entire road would be resurfaced, 72 years after it was originally laid. A number of bollards were also installed as there was nothing to prevent accidents or attacks. A few years earlier, the footpaths were renovated.

== Notable places ==
Places situated near Marine drive road:

- The headquarters of Board of Control for Cricket in India (BCCI) and Indian Premier League (IPL) situated inside premises of Wankhede stadium.
- Headquarter of Mumbai Cricket Association, governing body for cricket in Mumbai district.

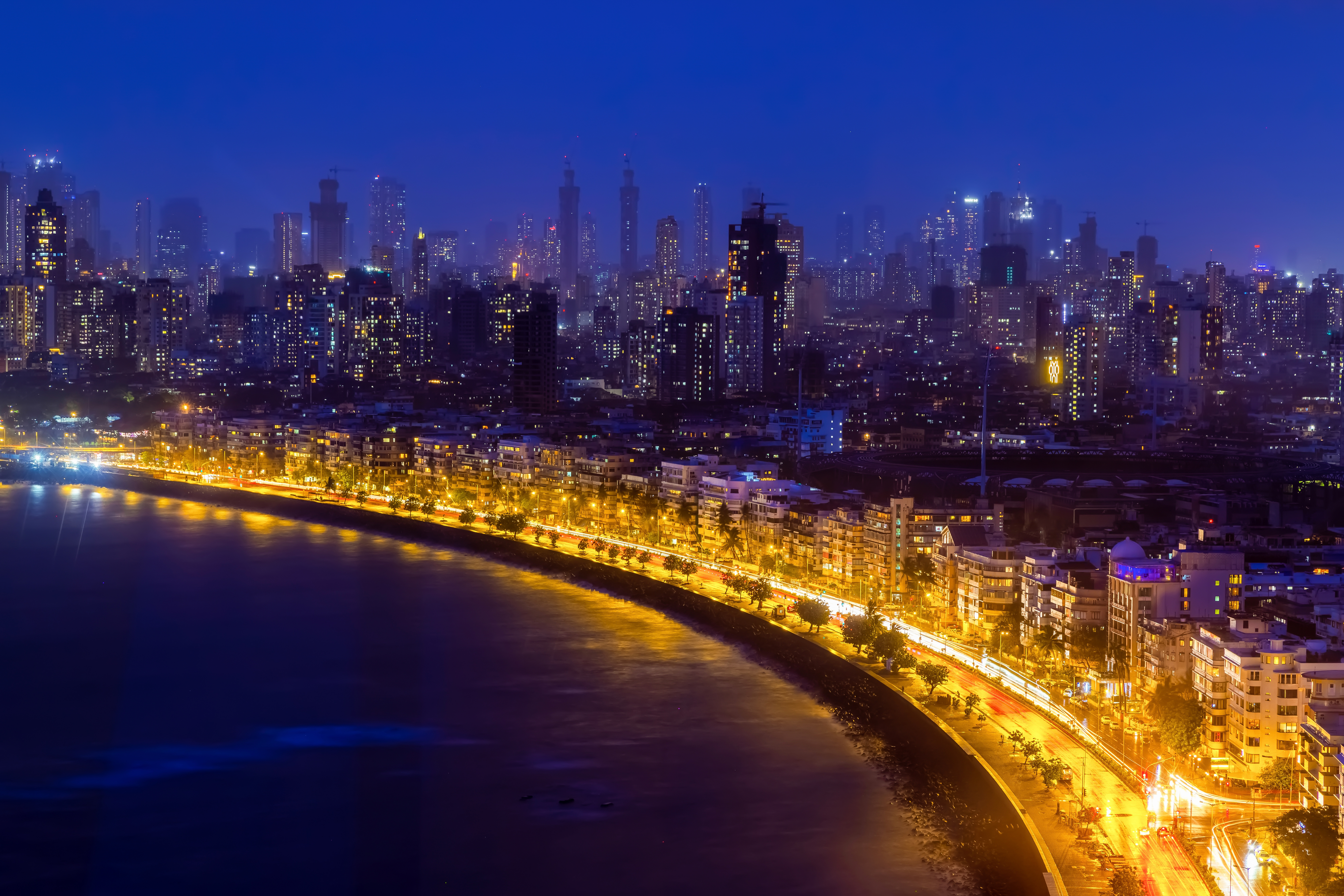
Marine Drive at dusk

== Major events ==
Major events and incidents happened on this place as of 1 October 2024:

- IAF airshow, 17 October 2004 and 12 to 14 January 2024
- Mumbai Marathon (every year since) 9 February 2004 — an international marathon.
- International Fleet Review 19 February 2001 — The world's major navies took part in the IFR.
- French Festival 1988.
- Terror attacks in 1993, 2003, and 2008: terrorists attacked targets near here and in other parts of the city. One of them, Ajmal Kasab, crashed a stolen car after driving it over a traffic island at Marine Drive and was apprehended. Two of Kasab's fellow terrorists, (identified as Fahadullah and Abdul Rehman alias A.R. Chota) attacked the Trident and Oberoi hotels and murdered 30 people in 3 days with assault rifles, pistols, and explosives before being gunned down by National Security Guard (NSG) commandos.

== See also ==
- Palm Beach Road, Navi Mumbai
- Corniche, a similar area in many other cities worldwide, including Abu Dhabi
