= Islam Gymkhana, Mumbai =

Gymkhana in Mumbai, India

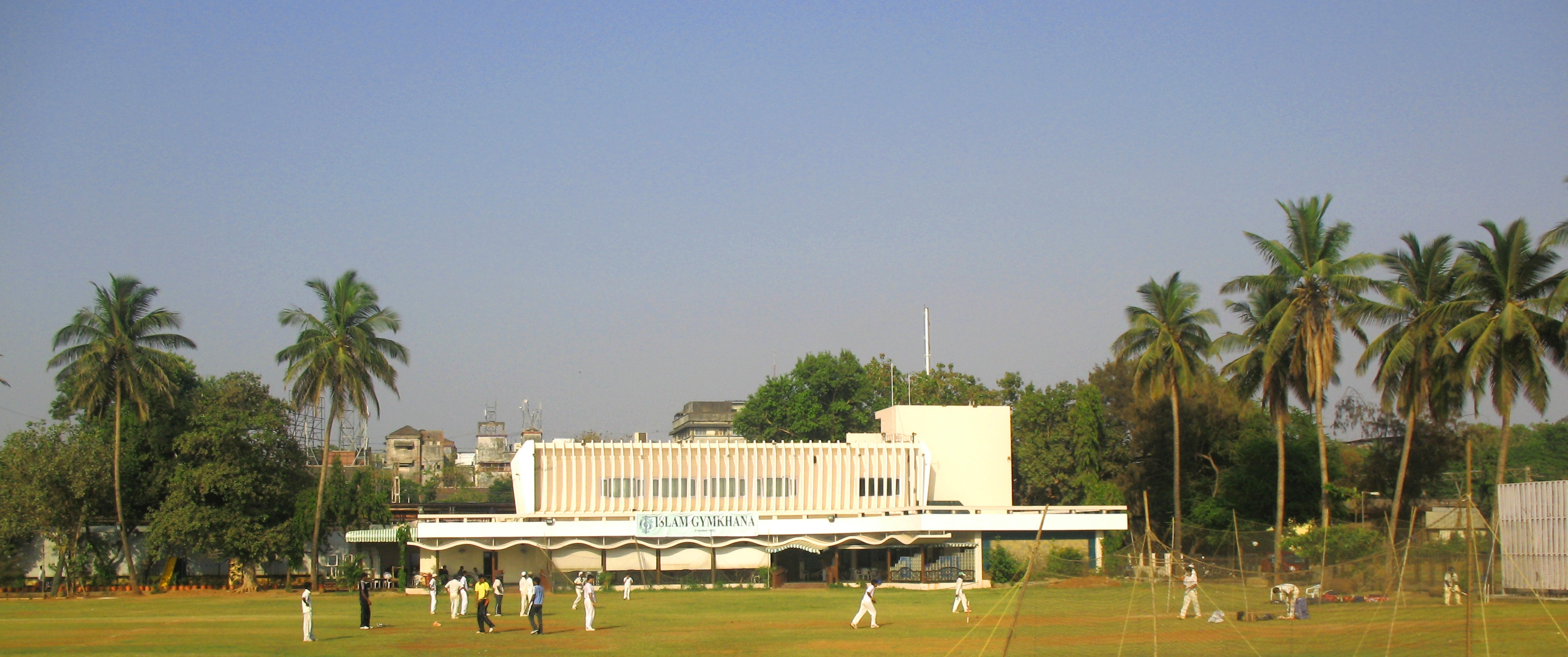
Islam Gymkhana as seen from Marine Drive.

Islam Gymkhana, is a gymkhana (social and sporting club) located along Marine Drive in Mumbai. Land for the gymkhana was allotted by the then Governor of Bombay, Lord Harris in 1890.

The gymkhana membership is open to people from all communities and is no longer restricted to Muslims. However, the gymkhana still hosts meetings of Muslim organisations. Islam Gymkhana fielded the Mohammedan XI during the Bombay Quadrangular and its successor Bombay Pentangular cricket tournaments.

During World War II, the government occupied the gymkhana premises as well as that of Parsi Gymkhana, forcing the adjacent Hindu Gymkhana to offer membership to Muslims and Parsis as an "emergency measure". The gymkhana has been identified as a Heritage Grade IIA structure.

As the gymkhana land belongs to the collector, one of its lease conditions is that the grounds should be accessible to the general public and non-sporting activities such as weddings are allowed to be held at the ground for up to 30 days in the year. In 2010, the local residents association moved court to ban non-sporting activities at the ground, since the general public was being denied access to it, something which the gymkhana denied.

In 2009, the gymkhana found itself at the centre of controversy when it removed Abbas Kazmi as one of its trustees for defending 2008 Mumbai attacks accused Mohammed Ajmal Amir Kasab in court.

In 2011, the collector restricted non-sport events to 25 days a year only on weekdays.
