= Hindu Gymkhana, Mumbai =

Gymkhana in Mumbai, India

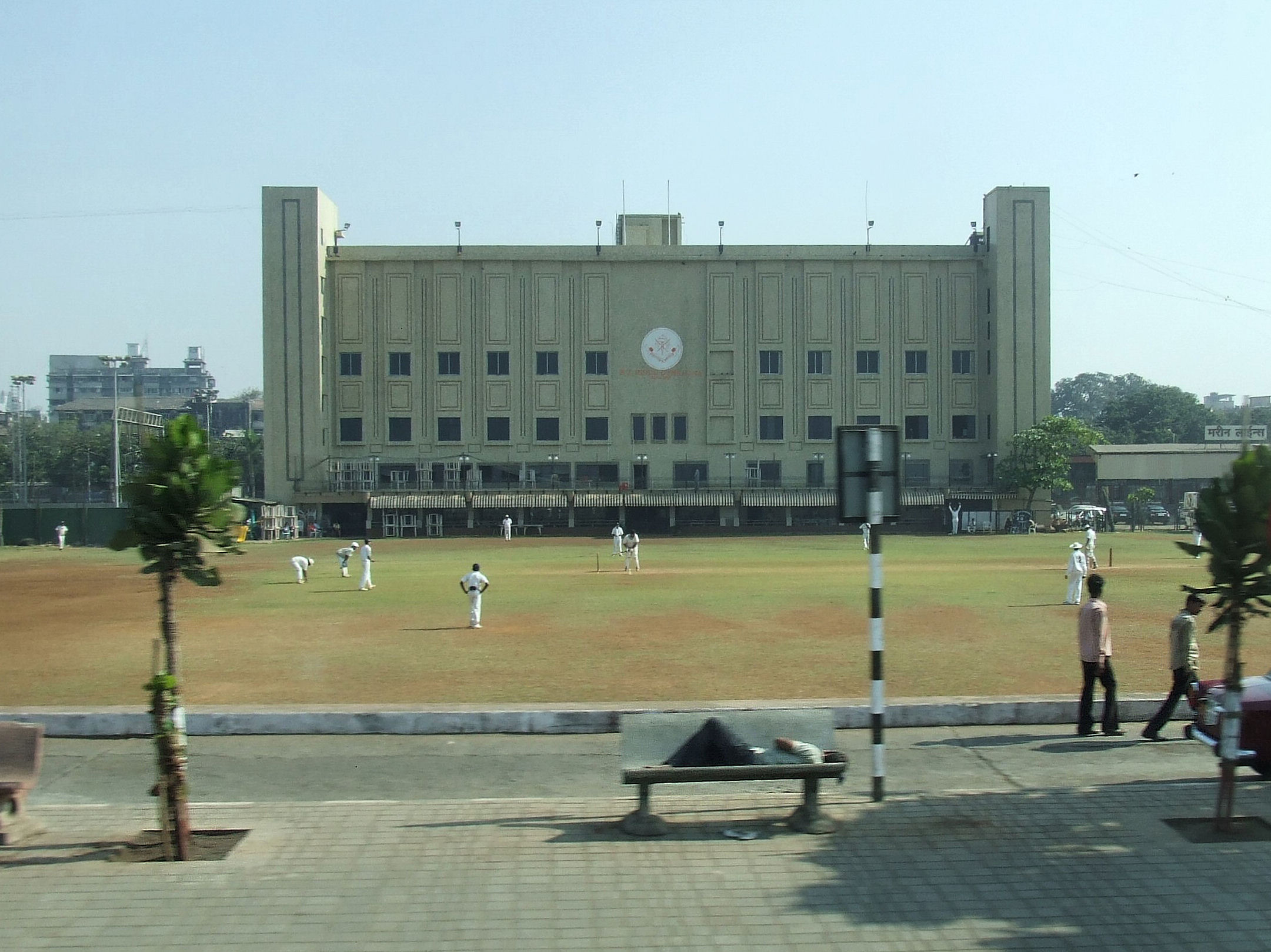
Hindu Gymkhana as seen from the road

Parmananddas Jivandas Hindu Gymkhana, Primarily, historically known as Hindu Gymkhana is a gymkhana (social and sporting club) located along Marine Drive in Mumbai. It originally started as Hindu Cricket Club in 1878. The gymkhana itself was inaugurated by then Governor of Bombay, Lord Harris on 5 May 1894. At that time it was located on Marine Lines, which was its only access route as Marine Drive was yet to be reclaimed. Until 1942, membership of the gymkhana was restricted to people of Hindu religion. In 1942, when the government occupied the adjacent premises of the Islam Gymkhana and Parsi Gymkhana in Bombay during World War II, the gymkhana threw its membership open to Parsis and Muslims as an "emergency measure". Hindu Gymkhana was responsible for fielding the Hindu XI in the Bombay Quadrangular and its successor Bombay Pentangular cricket tournaments. The gymkhana is one of the founder members of the Bombay Cricket Association. Hindu Gymkhana organises several tournaments such as Purshottam Shield Cricket Tournament, which is the oldest tournament started in 1912 that it organises.

The Gymkhana has been identified as a Heritage Grade IIA structure. As the gymkhana land belongs to the collector, one of its lease conditions is that the grounds should be accessible by the general public and non-sporting activities such as weddings are allowed to be held at the ground for up to 30 days in the year. In 2010, the local residents association moved court to ban non-sporting activities at the ground, since the general public was being denied access to it, something which the gymkhana denied. In 2011, the collector restricted non-sport events to 25 days a year only on weekdays.

Sachin Tendulkar gave his first television interview to Tom Alter at the Hindu Gymkhana grounds. Indian Batsman Eknath Solkar was the son of a groundsman at Hindu Gymkana.

== See also ==
- Hindu Gymkhana, Karachi
