= Central Gymkhana Ground =

Stadium in Madhya Pradesh, India

- Central Gymkhana
- Full name: Central Gymkhana Ground
- Former names: Gymkhana Ground
- Location: Indore, Madhya Pradesh, India
- Capacity: n/a

Construction
- Groundbreaking: 1960
- Opened: 1960

Website
- ESPNcricinfo

Central Gymkhana Ground is a multi purpose stadium in Indore, Madhya Pradesh, India. The ground is mainly used for organizing matches of football, cricket and other sports.

The stadium hosted four first-class matches from 1961 when Madhya Pradesh cricket team played against Pakistan cricket team in a tour match. until 1965. Since then the ground has hosted non-first-class matches.
