= Parsi Gymkhana, Marine Drive =

Gymkhana in Mumbai, India

Parsi Gymkhana
- Interactive map of Parsi Gymkhana
- Location: Marine Drive, Mumbai, Maharashtra, India
- Coordinates: 18.9448°N 72.8235°E

Construction
- Opened: 1888

Website
- https://parseegymkhana.in

Parsi Gymkhana is a gymkhana (social and sporting club) located along Marine Drive in Mumbai. It was built for sports and social activities of Parsis. The gymkhana is one of the founder members of the Bombay Cricket Association The club has its own cricket ground, the Parsi Gymkhana Ground, where Parsis cricket team's matches are organised.

It was the first gymkhana to be built on communal lines in Bombay. Founded by Parsi cricketers, the Gymkhana fielded the Parsi XI during the Bombay Quadrangular and its successor Bombay Pentangular cricket tournaments. Parsi Gymkhana was founded in 1884 and was opened in 1888. In 2010, Parsi Gymkhana along with other community organisations announced a project to revive interest in cricket among the community.

During World War II, the government occupied the premises of Parsi Gymkhana and of Islam Gymkhana, leading the adjacent Hindu Gymkhana to offer membership to Muslims and Parsis as an "emergency measure". As the gymkhana land belongs to the collector, one of its lease conditions is that the grounds should be accessible to the general public and non-sporting activities such as weddings are allowed to be held at the ground for up to 30 days in the year. During one such event in 2003, a fire caused by a leaking LPG cylinder injured 27 people. In 2010, the local residents association moved the court to ban non-sporting activities at the ground, on the grounds that the general public was being denied access to it, something which the gymkhana denied. Parsi Gymkhana had received special permission to hold events on 60 days during the year. In 2011, the collector restricted non-sport events to 25 days a year only on weekdays. The gymkhana is also used for other events, such as the unveiling of the world's most affordable car, Tata Nano by Ratan Tata in 2009.

== History ==
It is one of the historic, prestigious Gymkhana of Mumbai along with Hindu Gymkhana. Parsi Gymkhana won police shield tournament in 1956 and 2021. Legendary cricketers such as Farookh Engineer and Polly Umrigar have played for Parsis in the past. In 2021, the club became the first to win back-to-back trophies in three different format, that is Talim Shield T20, Police Shield triumph (Test format) and Madhav Mantri Centenary One-Day 45 overs League.
