= Eknath Solkar =

Indian all-round cricketer

Personal information
- Full name: Eknath Dhondu Solkar
- Born: 18 March 1948; Bombay, India
- Died: 26 June 2005 (aged 57); Mumbai, India
- Nickname: Ekki
- Batting: Left-handed
- Bowling: Left-arm medium; Slow left-arm orthodox
- Relatives: Anant Solkar (brother)

International information
- National side: India
- Test debut (cap 123): 15 October 1969 v New Zealand
- Last Test: 1 January 1977 v England
- ODI debut (cap 8): 13 July 1974 v England
- Last ODI: 22 February 1976 v New Zealand

Career statistics
Competition	Test	ODI	FC
Matches	27	7	189
Runs scored	1,068	27	6,895
Batting average	25.42	4.50	29.34
100s/50s	1/6	0/0	8/36
Top score	102	13	145*
Balls bowled	2,265	252	21,721
Wickets	18	4	276
Bowling average	59.44	42.25	29.89
5 wickets in innings	0	0	10
10 wickets in match	0	0	1
Best bowling	3/28	2/31	6/38
Catches/stumpings	53/–	2/–	190/–
- Source: ESPNcricinfo, 27 February 2013

Eknath Dhondu Solkar (18 March 1948 – 26 June 2005) was an Indian all-round cricketer who played 27 Test matches and seven One Day Internationals for his country. He was born in Bombay, and died of heart attack in the same city at the age of 57. A specialist close-in fielder, he was regarded as one of the greatest fielders in the world during his playing days. His catches per match ratio is one of the best in Test cricket.

Solkar was a capable batsman with a Test century to his name, and he could bowl fast as well as slow. Solkar was renowned for his excellent close fielding, of which he once remarked, "I only watch the ball." His catches helped India to victory against England at The Oval in 1971, the team's first Test win in England. Eknath's teammate at Sussex, Tony Greig once said, "He was the best forward short leg I've ever seen."

His 53 catches in only 27 matches is the best ratio for catches per Test match among non-wicket-keepers with 20 or more Tests. He is responsible for one of cricket's most celebrated quotes, directed at Geoffrey Boycott: "I will out you bloody."

== Early life ==
Solkar's father was the head groundsman at Hindu Gymkhana, Mumbai. Solkar used to change the scoreboards for the matches played at that ground. Anant Solkar, Eknath's younger brother, also played cricket at first class level, representing Maharashtra in Ranji Trophy matches.

During his days as a school cricketer, he toured Sri Lanka in 1964 and captained the Indian schools team against London Schools in 1965–66. The team included future India players Sunil Gavaskar and Mohinder Amarnath. He played for Sussex Second XI in 1969 and 1970 and became eligible to play for the first XI, but represented them in only one match.

== Career ==
Solkar made his Test debut against New Zealand at Hyderabad in 1969–70 and volunteered to field at short-leg. He became the first Indian Test Cricketer to be born post independence. He had a successful series against Australia the same season and against the West Indies in 1971. He was selected to open the bowling along with Abid Ali against England in England in 1971. In the first Test match of that series, he scored 67 and formed a 92-run partnership with Gundappa Viswanath which helped India take first innings lead. In the third Test at the Oval, he returned figures of 3/28 in the first innings, scored 44 runs, and took two catches, thereby played an important part in India's win. In the 1972–73 home series against England, he scored 75 in the first Test at Delhi. He took 12 catches in the five-Test series.

He did not play well against England in the away series of 1974, but dismissed Geoffrey Boycott in three successive innings (India vs Yorkshire and India vs MCC – first class fixtures). He scored his only Test century against the West Indies in Mumbai in 1975. Apart from his 53 catches in 27 Tests, he made 1,068 runs at an average of 25.42 and claimed 18 wickets at an average of 59.44. In the 16 years of his first-class cricket career, he scored 6,851 runs at an average of 29.27, including eight centuries, took 276 wickets at an average of 30.01 and took 190 catches. In Test Cricket, his job as bowler was to bowl 4–5 overs to take the shine off the new ball as much as possible before the Indian spinners took over.

At the end of 1976, Solkar, with 52 catches in 26 Tests, was the only non-wicketkeeper ever, with more than 50 catches, to average two catches per Test match. But in his 27th and last Test, he took only one catch and the average dropped below two per match, with 53 catches in 27 Tests.

For Mumbai's Ranji Trophy team he formed an opening bowling partnership with Abdul Ismail. In the 1973 Ranji final, he bowled spin on a turning pitch and took five wickets to help Mumbai to a famous victory in a match dominated by the spin bowling of Venkat, V. V. Kumar, and Shivalkar.
