= Parsi Gymkhana Ground =

Sports venue in Mumbai, Maharashtra, India

- Interactive map of Parsi Gymkhana Ground
- Full name: Parsi Gymkhana Ground
- Location: Mumbai, Maharashtra
- Owner: Parsi Gymkhana
- Operator: Parsi Gymkhana
- Capacity: 5,000

Construction
- Groundbreaking: 1878
- Opened: 1878

Website
- Cricinfo

Parsi Gymkhana Ground is a multipurpose club ground in Mumbai, Maharashtra. The ground is mainly used for organizing matches of football, cricket and other sports.

The ground was founded by Parsi cricketers, the Gymkhana fielded the Parsees cricket team during the Bombay Quadrangular and its successor Bombay Pentangular cricket tournaments. Parsi Gymkhana was founded in 1884 and was opened in 1888. In 2010, Parsi Gymkhana along with other community organisations announced a project to revive interest in cricket among the community. The gymkhana is also used for other events, such as the unveiling of the world's cheapest car, Tata Nano by Ratan Tata in 2009.
