= Mumbai Cricket Association =

Governing body of cricket in Mumbai, India

- Sport: Cricket
- Jurisdiction: Mumbai, Thane and Navi Mumbai
- Abbreviation: MCA
- Founded: 1930; 96 years ago
- Regional affiliation: Board of Control for Cricket in India (BCCI)
- Headquarters: Cricket Centre, Wankhede Stadium, Churchgate, Mumbai
- President: Ajinkya Naik
- Vice president: Sanjay Naik
- Secretary: Abhay Hadap
- Men's coach: Omkar Salvi
- Women's coach: n/a

Official website
- www.mumbaicricket.com

The Mumbai Cricket Association (formerly Bombay Cricket Association) is the governing body for cricket in India's Mumbai and surrounding regions such as Thane, and Navi Mumbai. Its headquarters is situated at Wankhede Stadium in Churchgate.

It governs Mumbai cricket team and sanctions cricket tournaments in Mumbai district. Its Mumbai team is among the most dominant in India's First-class cricket. It has won Ranji Trophy for record 41 times. Cricketers such as Vijay Merchant, Sunil Gavaskar, Sachin Tendulkar, Rohit Sharma, Jemimah Rodrigues etc. have played for MCA's team. Its team is historically known as batting powerhouse and for "Khadoos" style of play.

The association was established in 1930 as Bombay Cricket Association. Its name was changed after Mumbai got renamed as Bombay. It is one of three cricket associations that govern cricket in Maharashtra in different regions. The others are Vidarbha Cricket Association controlling the Vidarbha region and Maharashtra cricket association that governs cricket in the rest of Maharashtra.

== History ==
In 1972, under the presidency tenure of S.K. Wankhede, MCA built its own cricket stadium, which was named after S.K. Wankhede as Wankhede Stadium. MCA renovated it before 2011 ICC cricket World Cup. It is the home ground of Mumbai cricket team. Since 2007 BCCI's headquarters Cricket Centre is situated in the premises of MCA.

== See also ==
- Mumbai women's cricket team
- Maharashtra Cricket Association
- List of Mumbai cricketers
- List of Ranji Trophy records
- Hindu Gymkhana Ground
- Parsi Gymkhana Ground
- Cricket Club of India
- Brabourne Stadium
