= Parsis cricket team in England in 1888 =

International cricket tour (1888)

The Parsis made their second tour of England in 1888. The fifteen member team played mostly against amateur teams and was more successful than the tourists of 1886.

== The tour ==
The second Parsi team played 31 matches, winning 8 and losing 11, a considerable improvement upon the performance of the 1886 team which won only one out of 28. As in the previous tour, none of the matches are deemed first class. The tour was arranged by Pestonji Kanga, D.C. Pandole and J.M. Divecha. The outstanding success of the tour was Mehellasha Pavri who some consider as the first great Indian cricketer. A fast round-arm bowler, he took 170 wickets at an average of 11.66. At Eastbourne, he is said to have sent a bail flying nearly 50 yards, and at Norfolk when he uprooted a stump, it flew nine yards and pitched itself the right way up. Cooper who scored 952 runs at 18.30 topped the run aggregate. The tour saw the first appearance of players like Dinshaw Writer and Nasarvanji Bapasola who were to earn prominence in the 1890s.

Against the Gentlemen of Eastbourne, Parsis were made to follow-on and led by 122 in the second innings. But Pavri claimed six wickets and Eastbourne was bowled out for 56. At Scarborough, the opponents who needed four runs to win in the last half-hour were restricted to just three. The tour started on 7 June and ended on 13 September.

== The team ==
- P.D. Kanga
- S.H. Harvar
- J.M. Morenas
- M.E. Pavri
- R.D. Cooper
- D.F. Dubash
- N.C. Bapasola
- M.D. Kanga
- A.D. Vatcha
- K.R. Eranee
- D.S. Mehta
- D.C. Pandole
- B.D. Mody
- D.N. Writer
- J.M. Divecha

Harvar and Morenas were the only players who were part of the 1886 team.

== Match scores ==
1. 7–8 June at Leyton : Gentlemen of Essex 447 Parsis 134 and 205 for 9

Match drawn

2. 12–13 June at Blackheath : Gentlemen of Kent 146 and 250 Parsis 243 and 61 for 7

Match drawn

3. 14–15 June at Richmond : Gentlemen of Richmond 225 Parsis 99 for 8

Match drawn (12 a side)

4. 18–19 June at Chiswick Park : Parsis 80 and 161 Gentlemen of West Middlesex 164 and 78 for 5

Gentlemen of West Middlesex won by 5 wickets

5. 22–23 June at The Oval : Gentlemen of Surrey 126 and 366 Parsis 113 and 79

Gentlemen of Surrey won by 300 runs

6. 25–26 June at Southampton : Gentlemen of Hampshire 152 and 211 Parsis 137 and 116

Gentlemen of Hampshire won by 110 runs

7. 29–30 June at Brighton : Parsis 155 and 91 Gentlemen of Sussex 387

Gentlemen of Sussex won by an innings and 141 runs

8. 3–4 July at Hastings : Gentlemen of Hastings 182 and 95 Parsis 145 and 133 for 1

Parsis won by nine wickets

9. 6–7 July at Portsmouth : Parsis 133 and 120 United Services 124 and 45 for 3

Match drawn

10. 9–10 July at Rochdale : Gentlemen of Rochdale 295 Parsis 54 for no loss

Match drawn

11. 13–14 July at Longsight : Parsis 40 and 70 Gentlemen of Longsight 131

Gentlemen of Longsight won by an innings and 21 runs

12. 16–17 July at Stoke : Parsis 155 and 98 Gentlemen of Staffordshire 101 and 37 for 2

Match drawn

13. 18–19 July at Glasgow : West of Scotland 82 and 230 Parsis 89 and 27

West of Scotland won by 196 runs

14. 20–21 July at Bury : Gentlemen of Bury 64 and 40 Parsis 156

Parsis won by an innings and 52 runs

15. 23–24 July at Liverpool : Parsis 51 and 134 Gentlemen of Liverpool 130 and 56 for 5

Gentlemen of Liverpool won by 5 wickets

16. 27–28 July at Lord's : Parsis 91 and 35 for 2 MCC and Ground 179

Match drawn

17. 30–31 July at Northampton : Parsis 119 and 81 Gentlemen of Northamptonshire 61 and 42

Parsis won by 97 runs

18. 3–4 August at Bournemouth : Gentlemen of Bournemouth 56 and 41 Parsis 61 and 37 for 4

Parsis won by 7 wickets (12 a side))

19. 6–7 August at Norwich : Parsis 78 and 129 Gentlemen of Norfolk 137 and 73 for 9

Gentlemen of Norfolk won by 1 wicket

20. 8–9 August at Cambridge : Cambridge University LVC 106 and 296 for 7 Parsis 254

Match drawn

21. 13–14 August at Eastbourne : Gentlemen of Eastbourne 302 and 56 Parsis 168 and 256

Parsis won by 66 runs

22. 17–18 August at Leyton : Parsis 121 and 149 Twelve of Public Schools 178 and 94 for 4

Twelve of Public Schools won by 6 wickets

23. 20–21 August at Lord's : Parsis 177 and 74 MCC and Ground 232 and 21 for no loss

MCC and Ground won by 10 wickets

24. 22–23 August at Richmond : Gentlemen of Richmond 97 and 100 Parsis 164 and 35 for 3

Parsis won by 7 wickets

25. 24–25 August at Selhurst : Parsis 78 and 162 Gentlemen of Surrey 115 and 63

Parsis won by 62 runs

26. 27–28 August at Scarborough : Parsis 119 and 91 Gentlemen of Scarborough 140 and 70 for 7

Match drawn

27. 31 August and 1 September at Bridlington : Parsis 169 and 73 Gentlemen of Bridlington 91 and 131

Parsis won by 20 runs

28. 4–5 September at Birmingham : Gentlemen of Warwickshire 200 and 219 Parsis 164 and 62 for 3

Match drawn

29. 6–7 September at Leicester : Parsis 40 and 114 for 5 Gentlemen of Leicestershire 226

Match drawn

30. 10–11 September at Buxton : Parsis 132 and 91 Gentlemen of North Derbyshire 125 and 17 for 2

Match drawn

31. 12–13 September at the Oval : Gentlemen of Surrey 49 and 160 Parsis 82 and 118

Gentlemen of Surrey won by nine runs

== See also ==
- Parsi cricket team in England in 1886
