= Parsis cricket team in England in 1886 =

International cricket tour (1886)

The Parsi tour of England in 1886 (Note: In some older sources, Parsee is used as the name of the people as it was the colonial English spelling, but the name is now commonly written as Parsi.) was the first cricket tour of England by a team from India. While the tour was singularly unsuccessful for the Parsis in terms of results, it led to another trip by them two years later and more tours by English teams to India in the next decade.

== Background ==
The Parsis in Bombay were probably the earliest local community in India to take up cricket. Vasant Raiji recounts that Parsi schoolboys were being coached in 1839 and, when they grew up, they formed the Oriental Cricket Club in 1848. In 1876, the prominent Parsi player A. B. Patel formed the Parsee Cricket Club.

In 1877, the Parsis played their first match against Bombay Gymkhana. The earliest plan at a tour of England by a Parsi team was made by A. B. Patel in 1878. It fell through when Patel got involved in a libel suit and was unable to proceed with the plans.

A few years later, Patel, with the help of B. B. Baria and Dr Dhunjishaw Patel, made another attempt to organise the tour. C. W. Alcock, the Secretary of the Surrey Cricket Club served as the agent for the team in England. Robert Henderson, a Surrey professional, acted as the coach.

== The team ==
The members of the team were :

- Dr D. H. Patel (captain)
- B. P. Balla
- M. P. Banaji
- B. B. Baria
- S. Bejonji
- S. N. Bhedwar
- P. D. Dastur
- M. Framji
- S. H. Harvar
- D. D. Khambatta
- A. R. Limboowala
- A. C. Major
- P. C. Major
- J. M. Morenas
- J. Pochkhanavala

== The tour ==
The Parsi team was essentially made up of enthusiasts who were willing to pay their own expenses for the tour. Dhunjishaw Patel, a fast underarm bowler and decent batsman, captained the side. In terms of results, the team made little impression. Of the twenty-eight matches, they won only one and lost 19.

After a three-week voyage, the Parsis played their first match on May 24 against the Lord Sheffield's XI. The second match of the tour was against Marylebone Cricket Club (MCC) for whom W. G. Grace played at the request of the tourists. Parsis went on to lose by an innings and 224 runs, Grace scored 65 and took 11 wickets for 44 runs in the match. Most of the matches were similarly one-sided. The Parsis crossed 200 only once and scored only four fifties among them. Two notable performances in bowling were Shapurjee Bhedwar's hat-trick and 6 for 27 against Chiswick and Ashton. The only victory was on first innings against Normanhurst in a one-day game.

The last match of the tour at Cumberland Lodge against Prince Christian Victor's XII was arranged on the express desire of Queen Victoria. Prince Victor and his brother Prince Albert took part in the game. At the end of the match a garden party was held in honour of the guests. The team left England on August 24.

== Match scores ==
1. May 24–25 at Sheffield Park : Lord Sheffield XI 142 Parsis 46 and 53/4

Match drawn

2. May 27–28 at Lord's : MCC 313 Parsis 23 and 66

MCC won by an innings and 224 runs

3. May 31 - June 1 at The Oval : Surrey Cricket Club and Ground 314 Parsis 35 and 115

Surrey Cricket Club and Ground won by an innings and 164 runs

4. June 2–3 at Battersea : Prince's XI 71 and 229 Parsis 146 and 78

Prince's XI won by 76 runs

5. June 4–5 at Chiswick Park : Parsis 74 and 87 Chiswick Park 95 and 71 for 3

Chiswick Park won by seven wickets

6. June 7–8 at Leyton : Parsis 69 and 109 Essex Club and Ground 514

Essex Club and Ground won by an innings and 339 runs

7. June 9–10 at Harrogate : Harrogate 211 Parsis 85 and 103

Harrogate won by an innings and 13 runs

8. June 11–12 at Ashton-under-Lyne : Parsis 71 and 71 Ashton-under-Lyne 176

Ashton-under-Lyne won by an innings and 34 runs

9. June 14–15 at Derby : Derbyshire Cricket Club and Ground 342 Parsis 62 and 12 for 3

Match drawn

10. June 16–17 at Leicester : Parsis 59 and 156 Gentlemen of Leicestershire 239

Gentlemen of Leicestershire won by an innings and 24 runs

11. June 18–19 at Elland : Elland 162 and 125 Parsis 109 and 7 for 3

Match drawn

12. June 21–22 at Hull : Parsis 56 and 107 Hull 129 and 35 for 3

Hull won by seven wickets

13. June 23–24 at Middlesbrough : North Riding of Yorkshire 583 Parsis 212

Match drawn

14. June 25–26 at Scarborough : Parsis 145 Scarborough 497

Match drawn

15. June 28–29 at Edinburgh : Parsis 89 and 61 Gentlemen of Scotland 173

Gentlemen of Scotland won by an innings and 23 runs

16. July 2–3 at Oldham : Parsis 93 and 19 Werneth CC 190

Werneth won by an innings and 80 runs

17. July 5–6 at Liverpool : Parsis 89 and 157 Liverpool Club and Ground 482

Liverpool Club and Ground won by an innings and 236 runs

18. July 7–8 at Edgbaston : Parsis 64 and 109 Warwickshire Club and Ground 333

Warwickshire Club and Ground won by an innings and 160 runs

19. July 9–10 at Huddersfield : Huddesrfield 302 Parsis 75 and 59 for 2

Match drawn

20. July 12–13 at Nottingham : Gentlemen of Nottinghamshire 248 Parsis 105 and 71 for 4

Match drawn

21. July 14–15 at Southampton : Hampshire Club and Ground 288 Parsis 107 and 145

Hampshire Club and Ground won by an innings and 36 runs

22. July 16–17 at Portsmouth : United Services 377 Parsis 212

Match drawn

23. July 19–20 at Hastings : Hastings 234 Parsis 96 and 115

Hastings won by an innings and 23 runs

24. July 22 at Catsfield : Parsis 126 and 29 for 6 Normanhurst 81

Parsis won by 45 runs on first innings

25. July 23–24 at Gravesend : Gentlemen of North Kent 340 Parsis 133 and 132

Gentlemen of North Kent won by an innings and 75 runs

26. July 30–31 at Northampton : Gentlemen of Northamptonshire 263 Parsis 25 and 176

Gentlemen of Northamptonshire won by an innings and 62 runs

27. August 2–3 at Brighton : Sussex CCC 360 Parsis 94 and 97

Sussex CCC won by an innings and 169 runs

28. August 7 at Cumberland Lodge : Prince Christian Victor's XII 90 and 95 for 2 Parsis XII 33

Prince Christian Victor's XII won by 57 runs on first innings.

== See also ==
- Parsi cricket team in England in 1888

== Sources ==
- Bose, Mihir (1990). A History of Indian Cricket. London: Andre Deutsch. ISBN 978-0-233-98563-3.
- Guha, Ramachandra (2002). A Corner of a Foreign Field. London: Picador. ISBN 978-0-330-49117-4.
- Raiji, Vasant (1986). India's Hambledon Men. Bombay: Tyeby Press. ASIN B005XXBV9I.
