= Gymkhana =

Social and sporting club in the Indian subcontinent

Gymkhana (/dʒɪmˈkɑːnə/ jim-KAH-nə; Hindi: जिमख़ाना; Urdu: جِم خانہ; Sindhi: جمخانه; Assamese: জিমখানা; Bengali: জিমখানা) is a British India term which originally referred to a place of assembly. The meaning then altered to denote a place where skill-based contests were held. "Gymkhana" is an Anglo-Indian expression, which is derived from the Persian word "Jamat-khana". Most gymkhanas have a Gymkhana Club associated with them, a term coined during the British Raj for gentlemen's club.

More generally, gymkhana refers to a social and sporting club in the Indian subcontinent, and in other Asian countries including Malaysia, Thailand, Burma, and Singapore, as well as in East Africa.

== Etymology ==
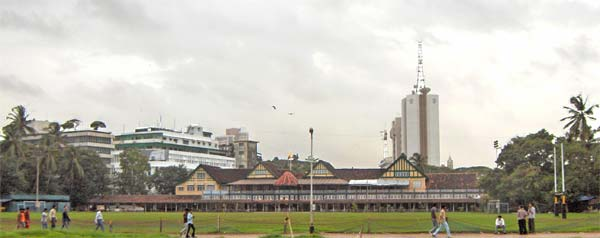
Bombay Gymkhana or Bombay Gym

The first element of Gymkhana comes from gend meaning ball in Urdu/Hindi/Hindustani/Khariboli. This element is distinct from the English word gym, short for gymnasium and gymnastics which has Greek and Latin roots. The second element, khānā has a Persian origin, meaning a home or a compartment. In Persian, (خانه) is a term for dwelling, house. The court language of the Mughal Empire was Persian.

== See also ==
- List of India's gentlemen's clubs
- Hindu Gymkhana
- Bombay Gymkhana, Mumbai
- Deccan Gymkhana, Pune
- Delhi Gymkhana, Delhi
- Golaghat Gymkhana, Assam
- Madras Gymkhana Club, Chennai
- Gymkhana Ground, Rangoon, Myanmar
- Jamalpur Gymkhana, Bihar
- Jorhat Gymkhana Club, Assam
- Karachi Gymkhana Club, Pakistan
- Lahore Gymkhana Club, Pakistan
- Nairobi Gymkhana Club, Kenya
