= Detienne =

Detienne is a surname. Notable people with the surname include:

- Marcel Detienne (1935–2019), Belgian historian
- Paul Detienne (1924–2016), Belgian Jesuit priest
