= Arogya Niketan =

1953 novel by Tarasankar Bandyopadhyay

- Author: Tarasankar Bandyopadhyay
- Language: Bengali
- Publication date: 1953
- Publication place: India
- Awards: Sahitya Akademi Award (1956)

Arogya Niketan (lit. 'The House of Cure') is a 1953 Bengali novel by the Indian writer Tarasankar Bandyopadhyay. Set in rural Birbhum, it portrays the psychological and philosophical tensions between tradition and modernity through the aging Ayurvedic healer Jiban Moshay, whose self-reflection and rivalry with a young doctor expose deeper fears of death, obsolescence, and generational change.

In 1955, it won the Rabindra Puraskar and in 1956 the Sahitya Akademi Award. In 1967, it was adapted into a film by Bijoy Bose.

The novel has been translated into Gujarati by Ramnik Meghani, Marathi by Shripad Josh, and Urdu by Shanti Ranjan Bhattacharya.

Dr. Sukumar Chandra, a medical student, who was particularly close to Tarasankar possibly influenced the character of the young doctor.

Arogya Niketan has been praised for its philosophical depth but criticized for "over iteration" and "stretched out description," with some critics suggesting Tarasankar's mastery showed more clearly in his short stories than in the novel form. Critic Rajakrishnan V. notes that it returns to classical ideals of greatness to address core human concerns, unlike the contemporary aesthetics which shaped by relativism and pluralism, have shunned the concept of literary greatness as outdated.

In his essay Literature as History of Social Change, K. N. Panikkar praised Arogya Niketan as a graphic portrayal of the decline of traditional medicine, saying it captured the shift more powerfully than standard historical texts.

== See also ==
- List of Sahitya Akademi Award winners for Bengali
