= Swami Prajnanananda (musicologist) =

Indian Hindu monk and musicologist (1907–1998)

- Born: Pashupati Banerjee; 31 August 1907; Prasadpur, Hooghly district, Bengal Presidency, British India
- Died: 8 October 1998 (aged 91)
- Education: University of Calcutta
- Occupations: Hindu monk, musicologist
- Organization: Ramakrishna Vedanta Math
- Known for: Research on the history and philosophy of Indian music
- Notable work: The Historical Development of Indian Music; A History of Indian Music; Sangit-O-Samskriti
- Awards: Rabindra Puraskar (1961); Sangeet Natak Akademi Fellowship (1963)

Swami Prajnanananda (31 August 1907 – 8 October 1998) was an Indian Hindu monk, musician and musicologist. A disciple of Swami Abhedananda, who was a direct disciple of Ramakrishna Paramahansa, he was associated with the Ramakrishna Vedanta Math in Calcutta (now Kolkata), and served as its president from 1984 until his death in 1998. He was associated with the Faculties of Music of the Calcutta University, Rabindra Bharati University and Visva-Bharati University.

He authored or edited over fifty books in Bengali and English, including multi-volume studies of Indian classical music, Vedanta and Indian philosophy. In 1963, he was awarded the Sangeet Natak Akademi Fellowship , the highest award of the Akademi, for his contributions to musicology.

== Early life and education ==
Born as Pashupati Banerjee on 14.5.1314 (according to the Bengali calendar), 1907, in Prosadpur, in the Hooghly district of present-day West Bengal. His father was Nakurchandra Banerjee and elder brother, Panchakari Banerjee. He graduated (B.A.) from the City College, University of Calcutta.

== Career ==
He received his monkhood initiation (Sannyas diksha) from Swami Abhedananda, a direct disciple of Ramakrishna Paramahansa and a contemporary of Swami Vivekananda.

Prajnanananda later served as president of the Ramakrishna Vedanta Math in Calcutta and of its associated Vedanta ashramas in Darjeeling, Kurseong and Siliguri. He edited the eleven volumes of Complete Works of Swami Abhedananda.

As a scholar of history and philosophy of Indian classical music, his notable books include, Sangeet O Samsktiti (1956) and Historical Development of Indian Music (1960). The latter won him the Rabindra Puraskar, highest honorary literary award given in the State of West Bengal, in 1961. In 1970, he received D.Litt. degree from Rabindra Bharati University. He died on 8 October 1998 at age 91.

== Bibliography ==
- Sangeet O Samskriti (Music and Culture, Bengali, 1956).
- Raga O Rupa (Bengali).
- The Historical Development of Indian Music (1960; second edition, 1973).
- A History of Indian Music, Anandadhara Prakashan, 1963.
- Music of the Nations: A Comparative Study (1973).
- Music: Its Form, Function and Value (1979).
- A Historical Study of Indian Music (revised edition, 1981).
- Cultural Heritage of Indian Fine Arts (1985).
- The Form and Function of Music in Ancient India.
- The Philosophical Ideas of Swami Abhedananda.
- Philosophy of Progress and Perfection.
- An Enquiry into Psychology, Soul and Absolute.
