= Sagar Theke Phera =

Indian novel

- Author: Premendra Mitra
- Original title: সাগর থেকে ফেরা
- Language: Bengali
- Publication place: India

Sagar Theke Phera is a Bengali language poetry book written by Premendra Mitra. The book was first published in 1956. Mitra received the Sahitya Akademi Award in 1957 for this work. The book also received Rabindra Puraskar in 1958.
