= Mrityunjoy Prasad Guha =

Indian scholar, academic

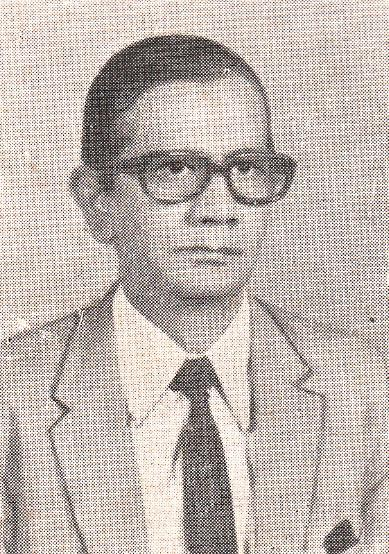
- Born: 26 August 1919; Mymensingh, Bengal Presidency, British India
- Died: 26 June 2012 (aged 92); Calcutta, West Bengal, India
- Occupations: Retd. Professor & HOD Chemistry, R.G. Kar Medical College, Calcutta
- Awards: Rabindra Puraskar 1964

Mrityunjoy Prasad Guha (26 August 1919 – 26 June 2012) was an Indian scholar, academic. He is noted for his work on Akash O Prithibi for which he was awarded Rabindra Puraskar in 1964.

== Early life and education ==
Mrityunjoy was born to a Bengali Hindu family of Mymensingh, then part of India; now Bangladesh which became a new country in 1971 following its separation from Pakistan which, in turn, was earlier shaped as a result of the partition of British India in 1947.

He completed his intermediate & formal education at Rajshahi College (1934-1938). Later on he pursued Masters in Chemistry at Presidency College, Calcutta University (1938–40).

== Literary work ==
- Bijnaner Bichitra Barta (Bengali) fetched him UNESCO Prize from Govt. of India in 1969.
- Sagarpranider Katha (Bengali)
- Akash O Prithibi (Bengali)
- Sonar Bangla Tomai Bhalobasi (Bengali)
- Stanyapayee Pranider Katha (Bengali)
- Alor Jharna (Bengali)
- Aparup Rupkatha (Bengali)
- Desh Bidesher Rupkatha Ebang Upakatha (Bengali)
- Chalo Jai Chander Deshe (Bengali)
- Jiber Kramabikash (Bengali)
- Petroleum (Bengali)
- On The Constitution Of Some Oxyacids Of Sulphur (English)

== Recognition and honours ==
- B.Sc. (Honors) Chemistry, Rajshahi College, 1938
- M.Sc. (First Class) 3rd Place, Calcutta University, 1940
- Cunningham Memorial Prize, Presidency College, Calcutta 1940
- Griffith Memorial Prize, Calcutta University, 1952
- Ph.D., Calcutta University, 1955
- Rabindra Puraskar, Govt. of West Bengal, 1964
- UNESCO Prize for Manuscript entitled 'Bijnaner Bichitra Barta' in Bengali, Govt. of India, 1969
- Sishu Sahitya Rashtriya Puraskar, 1970
- Ila Chanda Memorial Prize (Bangiya Bijnan Parishad)
- Kishore Gyan Vigyan Puraskar, 1993
- T.M. Das Foundation Award, 2002

== Sources ==
- Mrityunjoy Prasad Guha (1962). Akash O Prithibi (in Bengali). Indian Publishing House. p. 326. LCCN sa64000860.
- Rabindra Puraskar
- "Regional Language Books (Listing No. 17)" (PDF). Sagar Pranider Katha. Indian Publishing House. Archived from the original (PDF) on 11 April 2015.
- "Digital Library of India - Book Listing - Chalo Jai Chander Deshe" (2nd ed.). Archived from the original on 15 November 2015.
- "Digital Library of India - Book Listing - Jiber Kramabikash". Archived from the original on 15 November 2015.
- "Digital Library of India - Abstract - On The Constitution Of Some Oxyacids Of Sulphur" (PDF). Archived from the original (PDF) on 5 May 2015.
- "National Library, Ministry of Culture, Govt. of India".
