= Jaroslav Vacek =

Jaroslav Vacek (26 June 1943 – 23 January 2017) was director of the Institute of South and Central Asia and former dean of the Philosophical Faculty at the Charles University in Prague, where he founded the teaching and research of Mongolian as a new subject. He was a member of the Czech Oriental Society, the Prague Linguistic Circle, and The Learned Society. He translated the Bhagavad Gita from Sanskrit into Czech. Vacek was interested mainly in linguistic problems on the Indian linguistic area and the Dravidian and Altaic relationships, where he applied new research approach. He also spoke fluent Tamil and was an authority on Tamil and Dravidian linguistics.

== Membership and positions in international organizations and societies ==
- European Association of South Asian Studies, Leiden (co-founder and Vice-President, the Association was founded in Prague in 1997)

== Member of editorial boards ==
- International Journal of Dravidian Linguistics, Trivandrum
- India PILC Journal of Dravidic Studies, Pondicherry, India

== Awards ==
- 1997 – Golden Medal of Charles University – Rector of Charles University
- 2006 – Memorial Medal of Charles University – Rector of Charles University
- 2012 – Indian Presidential Award – Kural Peedam Award (Tamil: குறள் பீடம் விருது) for His contribution to the Classical Language of Tamil

== Personal life ==
He has been frequently visiting India, especially Hyderabad and Chennai for his research work.

== Selected writings ==
- Vacek, J., Dravidian and Altaic ‘Water – Viscosity – Cold’. An Etymological and Typological Model. Charles University, Karolinum Press, Prague 2002, 359 pp.; ISBN 80-246-0343-8; ISSN 0587-1255
- Lubsangdorji, J., Vacek, J., Colloquial Mongolian. An introductory intensive course. Vol. 1. Triton, Prague 2004, XI + 424 pp.; ISBN 80-7254-607-4; Vol. 2. Triton, Prague 2004, VII + 62 pp.; ISBN 80-7254-608-2
- Vacek, J., Dravidian and Altaic – In Search of a New Paradigm. Archiv Orientální, Vol. 72, 2004, pp. 384–453; ISSN 0044-8699; reprint: International Journal of Dravidian Linguistics (Trivandrum, India), Vol. XXXV, No.1, January 2006, pp. 29–96. Reg. No. 22651/72
- Vacek J., Oberfalzerova (eds.): MONGOLICA PRAGENSIA ‘02, Ethnolinguistics and Sociolinguistics in Synchrony and Diachrony. 2002 Triton ISBN 80-7254-320-2
- Vacek J., Oberfalzerova A. (eds.): MONGOLICA PRAGENSIA ‘03, Ethnolinguistics and Sociolinguistics in Synchrony and Diachrony. Triton 2003 ISBN 80-7254-472-1
- Vacek J., Oberfalzerova A. (eds.): MONGOLICA PRAGENSIA ‘04, Ethnolinguistics and Sociolinguistics in Synchrony and Diachrony. Triton 2004 ISBN 80-7254-606-6
- Vacek J., Oberfalzerova A. (eds.): MONGOLICA PRAGENSIA ‘05, Ethnolinguistics and Sociolinguistics in Synchrony and Diachrony. Triton 2005 ISBN 80-7254-754-2
- Vacek J., Oberfalzerova A. (eds.): MONGOLICA PRAGENSIA ‘06, Ethnolinguistics and Sociolinguistics in Synchrony and Diachrony. Triton 2006 ISBN 80-7254-920-0
- Vacek J., Oberfalzerova A. (eds.): MONGOLICA PRAGENSIA ‘07 sive Folia linguarum Orientis selecta (FLOS) 200 Triton ISSN 1802-7989
- Vacek J.: A Neytal Feature to Be Found in the Meghadúta? (in Pandanus ’98: Flowers, Nature, Semiotics – Kavya and Sangam. ) ISBN 80-902608-1-0
- Vacek J. : Types of formulaic expressions in Cangam – A preliminary survey of their structural patterns (in Pandanus ’01: Research in Indian Classical Literature) ISBN 80-902608-5-3
- Vacek, Nature as Symbolic Code in Old Tamil Love Poetry. (in Pandanus ’03: Nature Symbols in Literature. ) ISBN 80-902608-9-6
- Vacek J.: Old Tamil literary formulae connected with mullai (attributive phrases) ISBN 80-902608-6-1
- Vacek J.: Old Tamil literary formulae connected with mullai (2. mullai as attribute, complex phrases, anthropomorphic contexts) in (Pandanus ’04: Nature in Literature. )ISBN 80-903325-1-X
- Vacek J.:“Parrot” in Old Tamil Sangam literature – formulas and images (in Pandanus ’05: Nature in Literature, Myth and Ritual. ) ISBN 80-903325-2-8
- Vacek J.: The dog in Sangam literature – as a part of the description of nature (in Pandanus ’06. Nature in Literature and Ritual. ) ISBN 80-7254-899-9
- Vacek J.: The pig in Sangam literature – images and textual properties (in Pandanus ’07: Nature in Literature, Art, Myth and Ritual. ) ISSN 1802-7997
- Vacek J.: The rat in Sangam literature – as a part of the description of nature (in Pandanus ’08/2: Nature in Literature, Art, Myth and Ritual. ) ISSN 1802-7997
- Vacek J. (ed.) *Pandanus ’05, Nature in Literature, Myth and Ritual. Charles University, Faculty of Arts; Signeta, Praha 2005, 294 pp.; ISBN 80-903325-2-8 previous volumes (some with co-editors and international co-operation) ’98, 2000, ’01, ’02, ’03, ’04, ’05
- Vacek, J., Subramanian, S. V., A Tamil Reader, Introducing Sangam Literature. International Institute of Tamil Studies, Madras 1989, Vol.1, LIV+134 pp.; Vol.2, 130 pp.
- Zbavitel, D., Vacek, J., Průvodce dějinami staroindické literatury [Handbook of old Indian literature]. Arca JiMfa, Třebíč 1996, 537 pp. (chapters on old Tamil literature, pp. 174–207, 349–363, 394–421, 454–461); ISBN 80-85766-34-5

== Translated books by Jaroslav Vacek ==
- Čilaγun-u bičig, A Mongolian Prophetic Text. Edited, translated and commented upon by J. Lubsangdorji and J. Vacek. Studia Orientalia Pragensia XX. Charles University, Prague 1997, 87 pp.; ISBN 80-7184-415-2
- Vásanti, [Aakaasa viidugal]. From Tamil translated by Jaroslav Vacek. Triton, Praha 2000, 199 pp.; ISBN 80-7254-069-6
- Bhagavadgíta [Bhagavadgita, or the Song of Krishna]. Votobia, Praha 2000 (2nd edition), 243 pp. (translation from Sanskrit and samples from old commentaries; jointly with J. Filipský); ISBN 80-7220-028-3
