= Mahbub College High School =

Mahboob College High School

Location
- SD Road, Clock Tower Second Bazaar Area, Secunderabad, Telangana, 500036; India; 17.4400596°N 78.4950726°E

Information
- Former name: Anglo Vernacular School
- Established: 1862
- Founder: Somasundaram Mudaliar
- Campus: Urban

Mahboob College High School is a college located in Secunderabad a twin city of Hyderabad, India.

== History ==
The school was established in 1862 by Somasundaram Mudaliar and was called - Anglo Vernacular School. Sixth Nizam, Mir Mahbub Ali Khan made generous contribution. The school was renamed Mahbub College to commemorate Hyderabad Nizam's accession to throne. The school was visited by Swami Vivekananda in February 1893 before departing to USA for attending the Parliament of Religions. On 13 February 1893 Swami Vivekananda delivered a lecture "My Mission to the West""

== Notable alumni ==
Te school has produced a large number of prominent personalities in different fields

- Shyam Benegal
- Admiral Ram Dass Katari
- M L Jaisimha
- Mohan Kanda
- Shanti Ranjan Bhattacharya

== See also ==
- Education in India
- Literacy in India
- List of institutions of higher education in Telangana
