= Upendranath Bhattacharya =

Indian Writer from West Bengal

Upendranath Bhattacharya is an Indian Bengali writer.

== His books ==
This list is incomplete:

- Rabindra Kabya Parikrama
- Rabindra Natya Parikrama
- Banger Beer Santan
- Prithibir Ashcharjya
- Bangla Sahityer Sankshipta Itibritta
- Banglar Baul O Baul Gaan
- Banglar Baul Gaan

== Awards ==
He won Rabindra Puraskar for his musicology 'Banglar Baul Gaan' in 1959
