= M. L. Jaisimha =

Indian cricketer

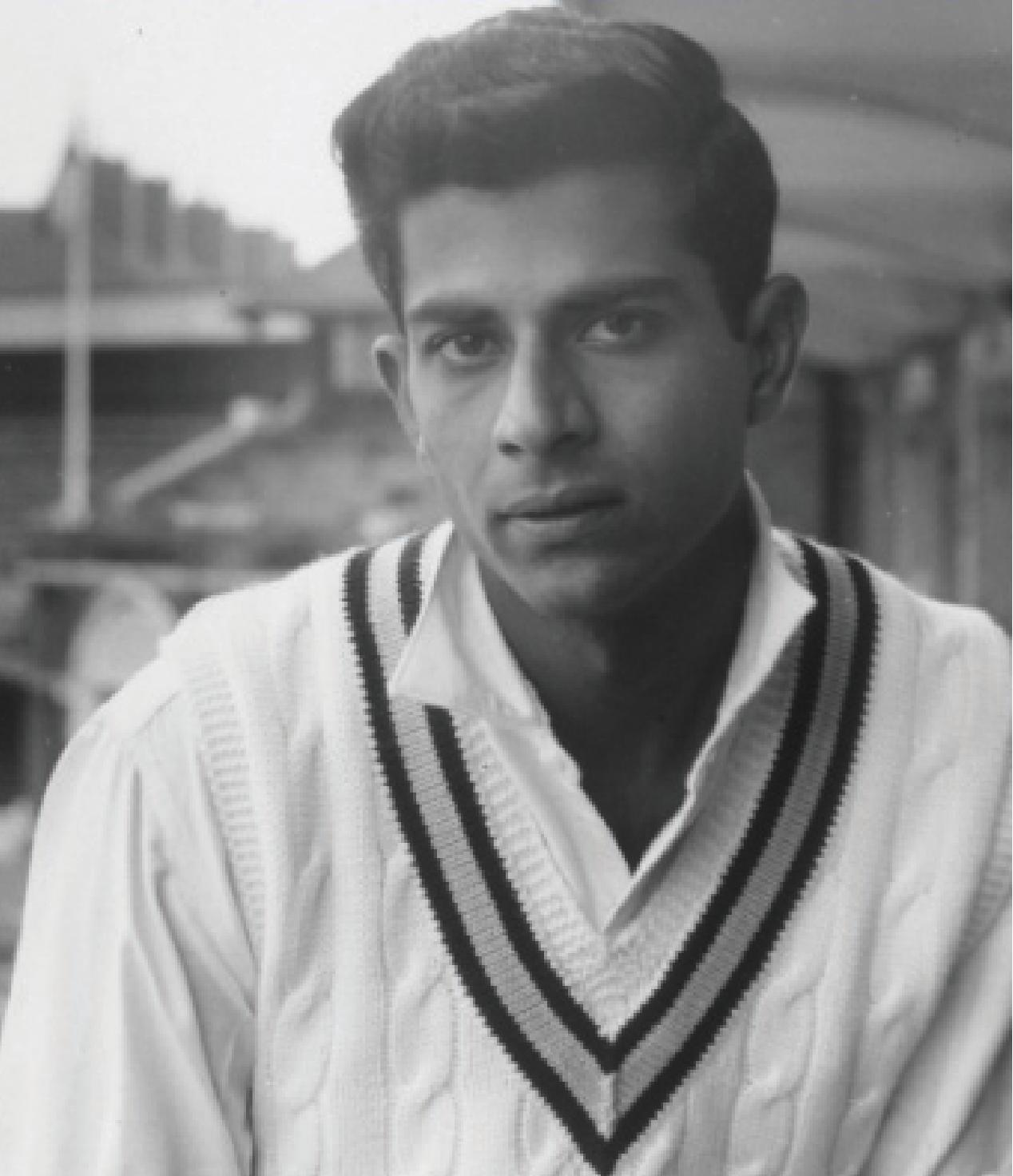

Personal information
- Full name: Motganhalli Laxminarsu Jaisimha
- Born: 3 March 1939; Secunderabad, Hyderabad State, British India
- Died: 6 July 1999 (aged 60); Sainikpuri, Secunderabad, Andhra Pradesh, India
- Batting: Right-handed
- Bowling: Right-arm medium; Right-arm off break
- Relatives: Vivek Jaisimha (son)

International information
- National side: India (1959–1971)
- Test debut (cap 91): 18 June 1959 v England
- Last Test: 13 April 1971 v West Indies

Domestic team information
- Years: Team
- 1955–1976: Hyderabad
- 1969: Rishton

Career statistics
Competition	Test	First-class
Matches	39	245
Runs scored	2,056	13,516
Batting average	30.68	37.44
100s/50s	3/12	33/65
Top score	129	259
Balls bowled	2,097	27,771
Wickets	9	431
Bowling average	92.11	29.86
5 wickets in innings	0	18
10 wickets in match	0	3
Best bowling	2/54	7/45
Catches/stumpings	17/–	157/–
- Source: ESPNcricinfo, 17 November 2022

Motganhalli Laxminarsu Jaisimha (3 March 1939 – 6 July 1999) was an Indian test cricketer.

== Playing career ==
Jaisimha was a right-handed batsman who was noted for his style on and off the field. He bowled medium pace, often opening the bowling for India, and off-breaks, and was a brilliant fielder. But it was the way he went about things that caught the eye. Partab Ramchand wrote after Jaisimha's death that "his slim figure, which he maintained till his last day, the boyish good looks, the inimitable gait, the trademark silk shirt and scarf, the sleeves buttoned at the wrist or the collar turned up – all these attracted immediate attention." Indian Cricket called him a "cultivated stylist".

Jaisimha made his first-class debut at the age of 15, in the 1954–55 Ranji Trophy, when he was still studying at Mahbub College High School scoring 90 for Hyderabad against Andhra Pradesh, and taking three wickets for 51 runs. After two indifferent seasons, in 1958–59 he cracked hundreds against Madras and Mysore, the premier teams in the South Zone. 20 wickets in Ranji matches in the same season found him a place in the side that toured England in 1959.

=== Test career ===
Jaisimha's Test debut at Lord's was disastrous, but his next two Tests won him notice. In the final Test against Australia in 1959–60 at Calcutta, he went in to bat towards the end of the first day and finished on 20 not out on the second day. He started his second innings just before stumps on the third day, batted throughout the fourth scoring only 59 runs, and was out on the final day for 74. This made him the first batsman to bat on all five days of a Test match. At Kanpur against Pakistan a year later, he batted through a whole day for just 54 runs. This innings, which lasted 505 minutes for 99 runs, ironically ended when he attempted a quick single to complete his hundred.

Meanwhile, he converted himself into an opener. While there was a bit of competition for the Indian middle order, Pankaj Roy was coming to the end of his career as an opener. In that position, Jaisimha scored Test hundreds against England in 1961–62 and 1963–64, and 134 against Ceylon in 1964–65. In the 1963–64 series against England he made 444 runs. In 1964–65, he batted in the middle order for Hyderabad and hit 713 runs. But failures in the Test matches led to him being dropped.

He was not part of the original team that toured Australia in 1967–68, but injuries to Chandu Borde and B.S. Chandrasekhar and the loss of form of others resulted in Jaisimha being flown in. He went straight into the Third Test and scored 74 and 101, nearly pulling off an improbable win. He never again exceeded 25 in Test cricket. Curiously, each of his three hundreds came in the third Tests of the respective series.

His last series was the tour of West Indies in 1970–71. Captain Ajit Wadekar wrote later that he found Jaisimha's counsel invaluable. In his last innings at Port of Spain he stayed for an hour scoring 23 and helping Sunil Gavaskar save the match.

He led Hyderabad for 16 seasons and 76 matches. The Indian captain Mansur Ali Khan Pataudi often played under his leadership.

== Later life ==
Jaisimha was a selector between 1977–78 and 1980–81, and managed the Indian tour to Sri Lanka in 1985–86. MCC made him a life member in 1978. He was also a TV commentator for some time and did commentary for the 1987 Cricket World Cup. His sons Vivek Jaisimha and Vidyut Jaisimha were first-class cricketers.

His death was due to lung cancer.
