= Hana Preinhaelterová =

- Born: Hana Pletánková; 12 September 1938; České Budějovice, Czechoslovakia
- Died: 24 June 2018 (aged 79)
- Citizenship: Czech
- Education: Charles University
- Scientific career
- Fields: Translation, ethnology
- Workplaces: Faculty of Arts, Charles University
- Theses: Humor v bengálské lidové literatuře (1968); Break-up for the Traditional Hindu Family as Reflected in Ashapurna Debi's Short Stories (1995)
- Doctoral advisor: Dušan Zbavitel

Hana Preinhaelterová (née Pletánková; 12 September 1938 – 24 June 2018) was a Czech Indologist and translator, specialising in the Bengali language and literature. She was well known for her Základní kurs bengálštiny ("Basic course in Bengali"), a set of textbooks for learning the language.

== Life and career ==
Hana Pletánková was born in České Budějovice on 12 September 1938. In 1958, she graduated from the School of Economics in Plzeň.

She studied Bengali and English at the Charles University in Prague under Dušan Zbavitel. For her postgraduate studies, she attended Visva-Bharati University at Santiniketan in India. Based on her experiences, she published Moje bengálské přítelkyně ("My Bengali Female Friends") in 1978, which was translated to Russian, Slovak and Bengali.

From 1964, she taught the Bengali language at the Faculty of Arts of Charles University.

In 1968, she published her doctoral dissertation titled Humor v bengálské lidové literatuře ("Humour in Bengali Folk Literature").

She compiled a four-part textbook of Bengali, Základní kurs bengálštiny and published in 1983. That same year, as a non-member of the Communist Party, she was purged and forced to leave Charles University when the teaching of Bengali was abolished. She taught English and Bengali at a language school in Prague till 1990, when she was able to return to the Faculty of Arts. She now focused on cultural anthropology and the interconnection of social and religious aspects in Bengali life. Her critical edition of bratas, Bengali fertility rituals, Ó Matko Lakšmí, dej mi dar!, was published in 2007.

For her candidate dissertation, Preinhaelterová analysed the disintegration of the Bengali joint family as depicted in the works of Ashapoorna Devi (1992). In 1997, her monograph Hinduista od zrozeni do zrozeni ("The Hindu from Birth to Rebirth"), depicted key stages in a Hindu person's life illustrated with specific cases. It was appreciated for its depth of coverage of the parameters of lives of Hindu women.

Preinhaelterová published a number of translations from modern Bengali literature into the Czech language. She concentrated on short stories by authors such as Ashapoorna Devi and Sunil Gangopadhyay. She also translated from Czech to Bengali.

On the occasion of her 70th birthday, a book of essays edited by Lubomír Ondračka, Mé zlaté Bengálsko: Studie k bengálskému náboženství a kultuře věnované Haně Preinhaelterové k jejím sedmdesátinám, was published in 2008.

Preinhaelterová died on 24 June 2018.

== Selected works ==
=== Monographs ===
- O statečném Rámovi a věrné Sítě. Albatros. 1975.
- Hinduista od zrození do zrození. Vyšehrad. 1997. ISBN 80-7021-211-X.
- Ó Matko Lakšmí, dej mi dar!. DharmaGaia. 2007. ISBN 978-80-86685-71-7.

=== Translations ===
==== To Czech ====
- Jasimuddin (1977). Upovídaný Gopa.
- Various (1986). Lásky nelaskavé. Práce.
- Tagore, Rabindranath (1999). Sadhana - The Realisation of Life [Sádhaná. O zlu a o lásce].
- Gangopadhyay, Sunil (2008). Ohromný svět.
- Devi, Ashapoorna (2009). Kdyby zdi promluvily.

==== To Bengali ====
- Němcová, Božena (1975). Sakhi sambad.
- Čapek, Karel (1976). Anubad.
