= Manibhushan Bhattacharya =

Bengali Poet (1938-2014)

Manibhushan Bhattacharya (3 May 1938 – 13 January 2014) was a major poet who transformed the language of Bengali poetry in the late 1960s and early 1970s. His poems were published in famous literary journals including the Buddhadeb Basu-edited Kabita, Porichoy, Chaturanga and Purbasha. Manibhushan questioned the dominant mode of writing poetry in his poems and transformed the language of poetry from within. In one of his poems, he expressed that it is futile to read the accomplished poets and stated that he only reads Samar Sen’s prose in Frontier.

== Early life ==
Manibhushan was born in a family of Sanskrit pandits in a small town, Sitakunda, in the district of Chittagong, now in Bangladesh, in 1938. The town was surrounded by the mountains and the sea. Metaphors of nature and religious-puranic traditions found a place in his poetic journey at different points of time. Manibhushan later settled at Naihati in North 24 Parganas and earned his livelihood as a school teacher in Kanchrapara Harnett High School of Kanchrapara. The everyday life of the subaltern people found expression in his poems.

== Career as poet ==
Manibhushan started publishing his poems in the 1950s. The brutal counter-insurgent violence of the Indian state against the Naxalites found place in his second book of poems, Utkantha Sharbari, published in 1971. However, his collection of political poems, Gandhinagare Ratri, published in 1974, marked a revolution in the world of Bengali poetry. In a sense, this book is the testament of the burning 1970s. The first poem incorporated in the collection, Gandhinagare Ratri, was a vivid poetic narrative of the killing of a subaltern political activist, Gokul, by police firing, his mother’s pathos, typical responses of middle- class characters and angry protest by a jute mill labourer. The poem ended with a line from Rabindranath Tagore. The aesthetic chemistry of the poem violated all conventions. It is quite natural that Manibhushan Bhattacharya’s poetry took different turns in changing times. Writing poetry for him was nothing but dialogue with the self. So, romance and revolution got merged in his poetry. He decided to write mostly for little magazines. The mainstream media maintained silence regarding his creative endeavours, but he cared little for such a "culture of silence" and his poems reverberated loudly nonetheless.

== Books ==
- Koyekti Konthyoswor, 1962.
- Utkanthyo Sharbari, 1971.
- Gandhinagar e Ratri, 1974.
- Manus er Odhikar, 1977.
- Dakshin Somudrer Gaan, 1980.
- Pracchyer Sonnyashi, 1983.
- Oitihashik Podojatrya, 1985 (with Poet Birendra Chattopadhyay).
- Baishakh er Pheriwala, 1989 (with Poet Atindra Majumdar).
- Obicchinnyo Ontwopur, 1993.
- Poribrajok er Jololipi, 1995.
- Naishobhoj, 1997.
- Procchonnyo Porage, 2000.
- Pathyogronthyer Bhumika, 2001.
- Raat Tinter Kobita, 2004.
- Babui er Basa, 1995.
- Nirbachito Kobita 1st edition, 1981.
- Nirbachito Kobita 2nd edition, 1986.
- Sresthyo Kobita (Published by Proma), 1992.
- Swonirbachito Kobita, 2005.
- Sresthyo Kobita (Published by Dey's Publishing), 2007 (Rabindra Puroshkar).
- Ghalib (Translation from English), Sahitya Academy, 1997.
- Kashphul (Collection), 2002.
- Rajhansh, 2008.
- Atmobhoj, 2011.

== Awards ==
- Rabindra Puraskar.
- Birendra Purashkar.
- Arun Mitra Smriti Purashkar.
- Mohadigontyo Purashkar.
