= Swami Abhedananda =

Indian Hindu mystic (1866-1939)

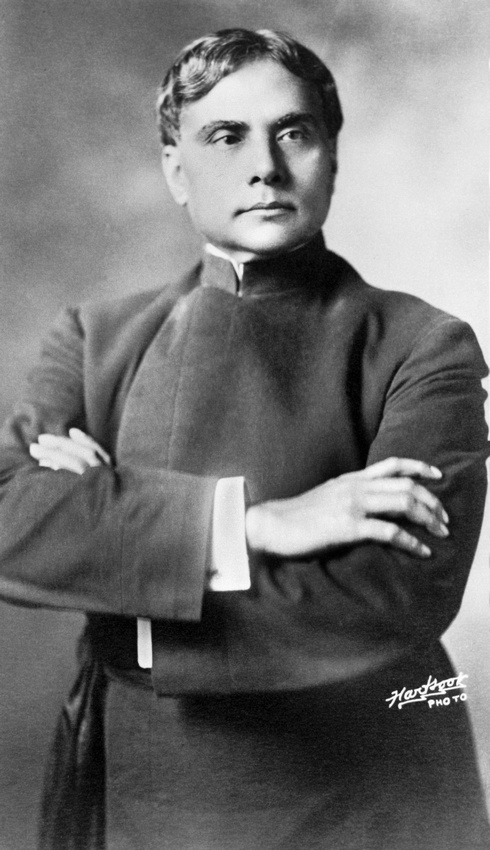
- Abhedananda, c. 1910

Personal life
- Born: Kaliprasad Chandra; 2 October 1866 Calcutta, Bengal, British India
- Died: 8 September 1939 (aged 72) Calcutta, Bengal, British India

Religious life
- Religion: Hindu
- Philosophy: Advaita Vedanta

Senior posting
- Teacher: Ramakrishna Paramahamsa

Swami Abhedananda (2 October 1866 – 8 September 1939), born Kaliprasad Chandra, was a direct disciple of the 19th century mystic Ramakrishna Paramahansa and the founder of Ramakrishna Vedanta Math. Swami Vivekananda sent him to the West to head the Vedanta Society of New York in 1897, and spread the message of Vedanta, a theme on which he authored several books through his life, and subsequently founded the Ramakrishna Vedanta Math, in Calcutta (now Kolkata) and Darjeeling.

== Early life and education ==
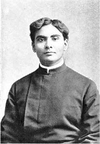
Swami Abhedananda, in his youth.

He was born in north Calcutta on 2 October 1866 and was named Kaliprasad Chandra. His father was Rasiklal Chandra and his mother was Nayantara Devi. In 1884, at the age of 18, while studying for the school final examination under the University of Calcutta, he went to Dakshineswar and met Sri Ramakrishna. Thereafter, in April 1885, he left home to be with him, during his final illness, first at Shyampukur and then at Cossipur Garden-house near Calcutta.

== Monastic life ==
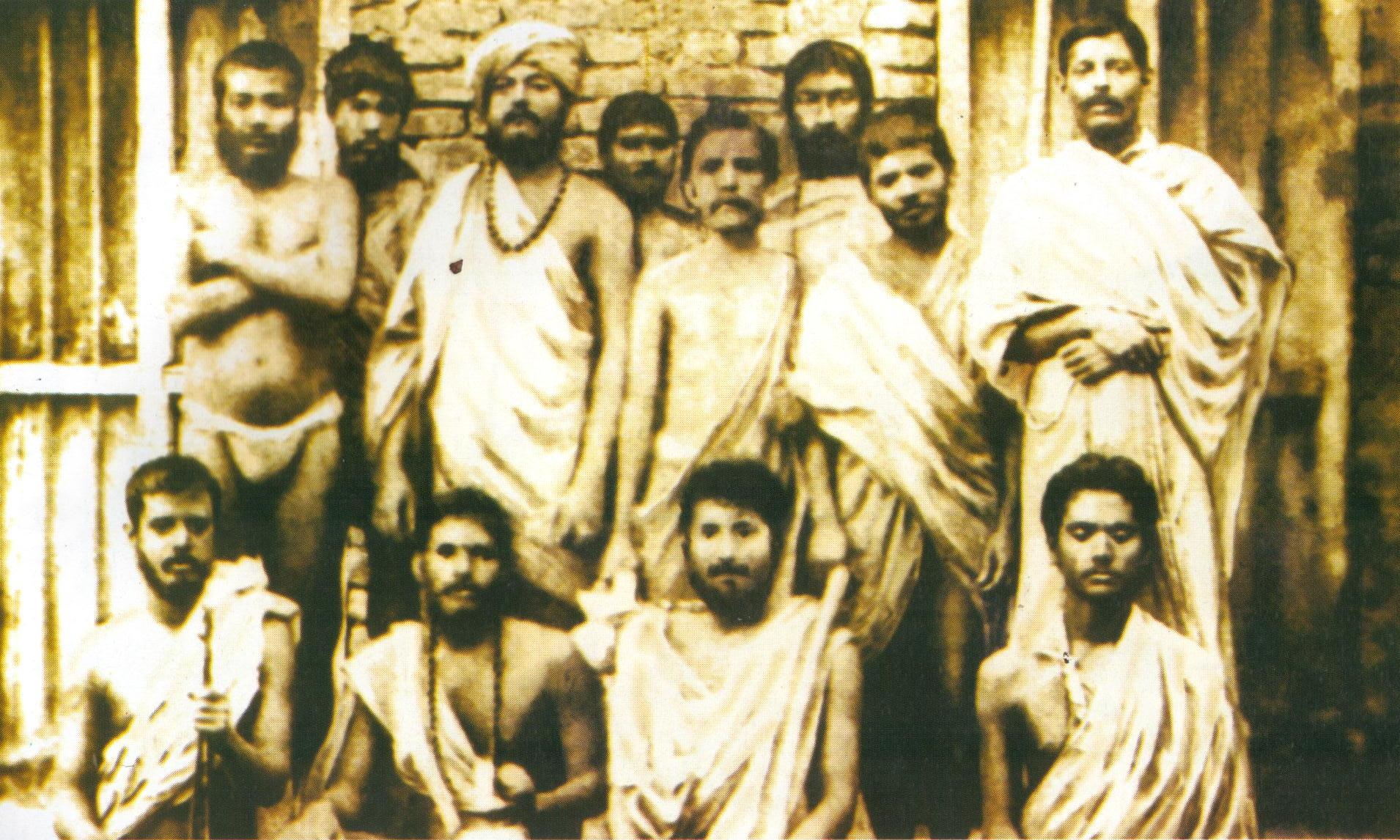
Group photo taken on 30 January 1887 In Baranagar Math, Kolkata. Standing: (l–r) Swami Shivananda, Swami Ramakrishnananda, Swami Vivekananda, Randhuni, Debendranath Majumdar, Mahendranath Gupta (Shri M), Swami Trigunatitananda, H.Mustafi Sitting: (l–r) Swami Niranjanananda, Swami Saradananda, Hutko Gopal, Swami Abhedananda

After his Master's death in 1886, he plunged into intense sadhana (meditations), by shutting himself up in a room at the Baranagar Math, this gave him the name "Kali Tapaswi" amongst his fellow disciples. After the death of Ramakrishna, he formally became a Sanyasi along with Vivekananda and others, and came to be known as "Swami Abhedananda Puri".

For the next ten years, of his life as a monk, he travelled extensively throughout India, depending entirely on alms. During this time he met several famous sages like Pavhari Baba, Trailanga Swami and Swami Bhaskaranand. He went to the sources of the Ganges and the Yamuna, and meditated in the Himalayas. He was a forceful orator, prolific writer, yogi and intellectual with devotional fervour.

In 1896, Vivekananda was in London, when he asked Abhedananda to join him, and propagate the message of Vedanta in the West, which he did with great success. He went to the US in 1897, when Vivekananda asked him to take charge of the Vedanta Society in New York, here he preached messages of Vedanta and teachings of his Guru for about 25 years, travelling far and wide to the United States, Canada, Mexico, Japan and Hong Kong. Finally, he returned to India in 1921, after attending the Pan-Pacific Education Conference at Honolulu. Abhedananda was a strict vegetarian who lectured on the subject. In 1898, he gave a speech on "Why a Hindu is a Vegetarian" to the Vegetarian Society of New York.

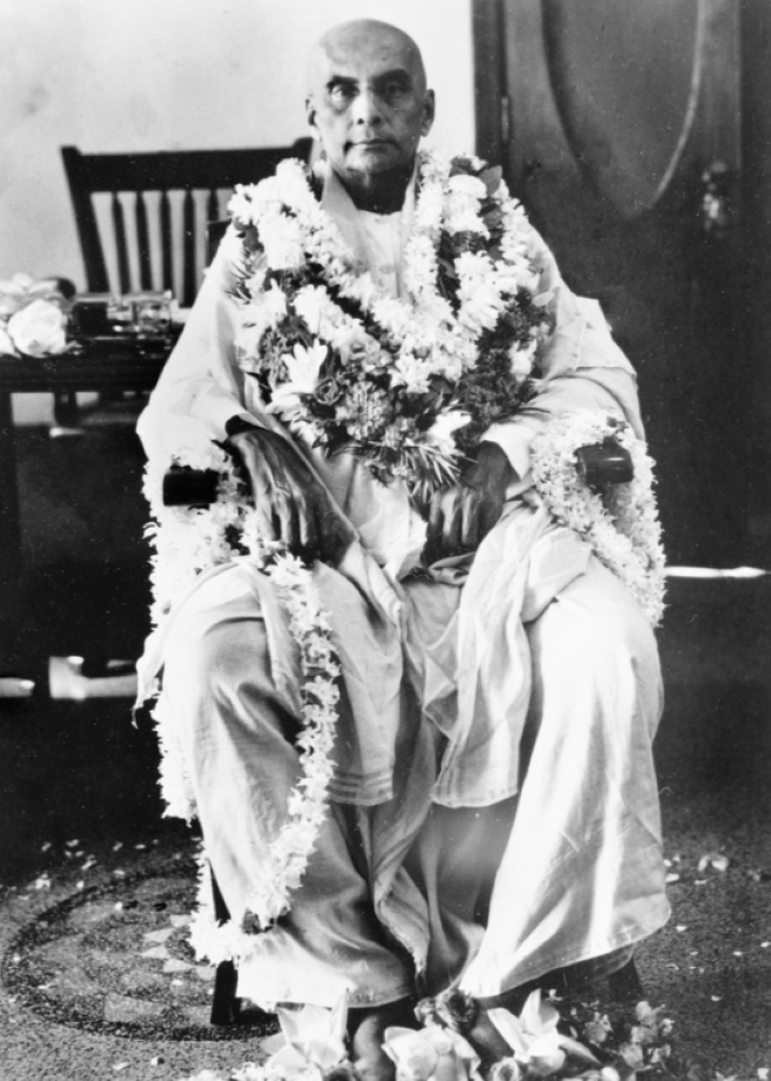
Swami Abbhedananda in his old age

In 1922, he crossed the Himalayas on foot and reached Tibet, where he studied Buddhist philosophy and Tibetan Buddhism. In Hemis Monastery, he claimed to have discovered a manuscript on the lost years of Jesus, which has been incorporated in the book Swami Abhedananda's Journey into Kashmir & Tibet published by the Ramakrishna Vedanta Math. Years earlier, writer Nicolas Notovitch claimed to have found the same manuscript in the same place; however, when philologist Max Müller wrote to the monastery to ask for further details, the lama confirmed that no Westerner had visited the monastery in the fifteen years prior, and that no such manuscript existed. Müller concluded that the story was a hoax; other historians agree.

He formed the Ramakrishna Vedanta Society in Kolkata in 1923, which is now known as Ramakrishna Vedanta Math. In 1924, he established Ramakrishna Vedanta Math in Darjeeling in Bengal Presidency (now West Bengal). In 1927, he started publishing Visvavani, the monthly magazine of the Ramakrishna Vedanta Society, which he edited from 1927 to 1938, and which is still published today. In 1936, he presided over the Parliament of Religions at the Town Hall, Calcutta, as a part the birth centenary celebrations of Ramakrishna.

He died on 8 September 1939 at Ramakrishna Vedanta Math. At the time of his death, he was the last surviving direct disciple of Ramakrishna.

== Works ==
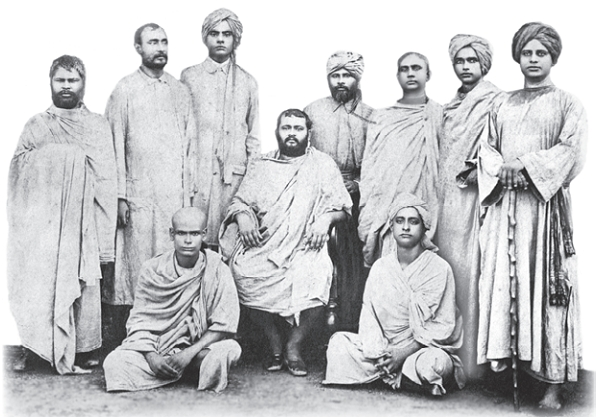
Alambazar Math, 1896 (farewell to Swami Abhedananda leaving for the US)(from left) standing: Swami Adbhutananda, Yogananda, Abhedananda, Trigunatitananda, Turiyananda, Nirmalananda, and Niranjanananda; sitting: Swamis Subodhananda, Swami Brahmananda (on chair), and Akhandananda

- Gospel of Ramakrishna, by Swami Abhedananda. Published by The Vedanta Society, 1907. Online version
- Vedanta Philosophy; Three Lectures on Spiritual Unfoldment: Three Lectures on Spiritual Unfoldment, by Swami Abhedananda. Published by The Vedanta Society, 1901. Online version
- Why a Hindu is a Vegetarian, by Swami Abhedananda. Published by The Vedanta Society, 1900.
- How to be a Yogi, by Swami Abhedananda. Forgotten Books, 1902. ISBN 1-60506-647-8. Online Version
- The Sayings of Sri Ramakrishna, by Ramakrishna, Abhedananda. Published by The Vedanta society, 1903.
- India and Her People, by Swami Abhedananda. Published by Satish Chandra Mukherjee, 1906.
- Ideal of Education, by Swami Abhedananda. Published by Ramakrishna Vedanta Math, 1945. Online version
- An Introduction of Philosophy of Panchadasi, by Swami Abhedananda. Published by Ramakrishna Vedanta Math, 1948. Online version
- Abhedananda in India in 1906, by Abhedananda. Published by Ramakrishna Vedanta Math, 1968.
- Vedanta Philosophy: Five Lectures on Reincarnation, by Swami Abhedananda. Kessinger Publishing, 1907. ISBN 1-56459-886-1. Online version
- Reincarnation, by Swami Abhedananda. Kessinger Publishing, 2003. ISBN 0-7661-2992-6.
- The Great Saviours of the World, by Swami Abhedananda. Pub. by Ramakrishna Vedanta Math, 1957.
- True Psychology, by Swami Abhedananda, Pub. by Ramakrishna Vedanta Math, 1965.
- Yoga Psychology, by Swami Abhedananda, Prajnanananda. Pub. by Ramakrishna Vedanta Math, 1967.
- Complete Works of Swami Abhedananda, by Abhedananda. Pub. by Ramakrishna Vedanta Math, 1970.
- Doctrine of Karma: A Study in Philosophy and Practice of Work, by Swami Abhedananda. Pub. by Vedanta Pr, 1975. ISBN 0-87481-608-4. Online version
- Spiritual Teachings of Swami Abhedananda, by Swami Abhedananda. Pub. by Ramakrishna Vedanta Math, 1962.
- Life Beyond Death: A Critical Study of Spiritualism, by Swami Abhedananda. Pub. by Vedanta Pr, 1986. ISBN 0-87481-616-5.
- Science of Psychic Phenomena, by Swami Abhayananda, Swami Abhedananda. Pub. by Ramakrishna Vedanta Math, 1987. ISBN 0-87581-642-8.
- Hymn offerings to Sri Ramakrsna & the Holy Mother, by Swami Abhedananda, Ramakrishna Vedanta Centre, Ramakrishna Math. Pub. by Sri Ramakrsna Math, 1988.
- Journey into Kashmir and Tibet, by Swami Abhedananda. Pub. by Vedanta Pr, 1988. ISBN 0-87481-643-2.
- Path of Realization, by Swami Abhedananda. Ramakrishna Vedanta Math, 1994.
- The Mystery of Death: A Study in the Philosophy and Religion of the Katha Upanishad, by Swami Abhedananda. Pub. by Ramakrishna Vedanta Math, 1996.
- Vedanta Philosophy: Self-Knowledge Atma-Jnana, by Swami Abhedananda. Kessinger Publishing, 1998. ISBN 0-7661-0126-6. Online version
- Ramakrishna Kathamrita and Ramakrishna: Memoirs of Ramakrishna, by Swami Abhedananda. Vedanta Pr. 1988. ISBN 0-87481-654-8.
- Yogi Thoughts on Reincarnation, by Swami Abhedananda. Kessinger Publishing, LLC, 2005. ISBN 1-4254-5307-4.
- Prana and the Self, by Swami Abhedananda. Kessinger Publishing, LLC, 2005. ISBN 1-4253-3350-8.
- The Complete Book of Vedanta Philosophy, by Swami Abhedananda. Kessinger Publishing, LLC, 2005. ISBN 1-4254-5313-9.
- The Woman's Place In Hindu Religion, by Swami Abhedananda. Kessinger Publishing, LLC, 2005. ISBN 1-4253-3570-5.
- Philosophy of Work: Three Lectures, by Swami Abhedananda. Kessinger Publishing, 2006. ISBN 1-4254-9129-4. Online version
- Divine Heritage of Man: Vedanta philosophy, by Swami Abhedananda. Kessinger Publishing, 2006. ISBN 1-4286-1256-4. PDF version
- Attitude of Vedanta Towards Religion, by Swami Abhedananda. READ BOOKS, 2007. ISBN 1-4067-5330-0. Online version
- Amar Jivan-katha (Autobiography) (in Bengali), by Swami Abhedananda.
