= Shanti Ranjan Bhattacharya =

Indian Urdu scholar, translator, and literary figure of Bengali origin

- শান্তিরঞ্জন ভট্টাচার্য
- Born: 24 September 1930; Masura, Bhojeshwar, Faridpur District, Bengal Presidency (now Bangladesh)
- Died: 15 September 1993 (aged 62); Kolkata, West Bengal, India
- Education: Mahbub College High School (Secunderabad)
- Occupations: Scholar, writer, Urdu–Bengali translator
- Notable work: Bengali Hinduon ki Urdu Khidmaat (1963); Tazkirah-e-Tasanif-e-Bangala
- Awards: Rabindra Puraskar (1966); Honorary D.Litt. (1967); Sahitya Akademi Translation Prize (1991)

Shanti Ranjan Bhattacharya (24 September 1930 – 15 September 1993) was a Bengali scholar and writer known for his contributions to Urdu literature. He explored the linguistic and literary connections between Urdu and Bengali, and documented the role of Bengali Hindus in the development of Urdu. His seminal book Bengali Hinduon ki Urdu Khidmaat (The Contributions of Bengali Hindus to Urdu) earned him the Rabindra Puraskar awarded by the Government of West Bengal in 1966.

== Early life and background ==
Bhattacharya was born on 24 September 1930 in Masura village, Bhojeshwar, then located in Faridpur District of East Bengal (now in Bangladesh). He hailed from a Bengali Brahmin family of the Vasishtha lineage, traditionally associated with priesthood and Sanskrit scholarship. His grandfather, Bhagwan Chandra Bhattacharya, named him "Shanti" to mark a newfound period of peace and prosperity in the family.

== Education and career ==
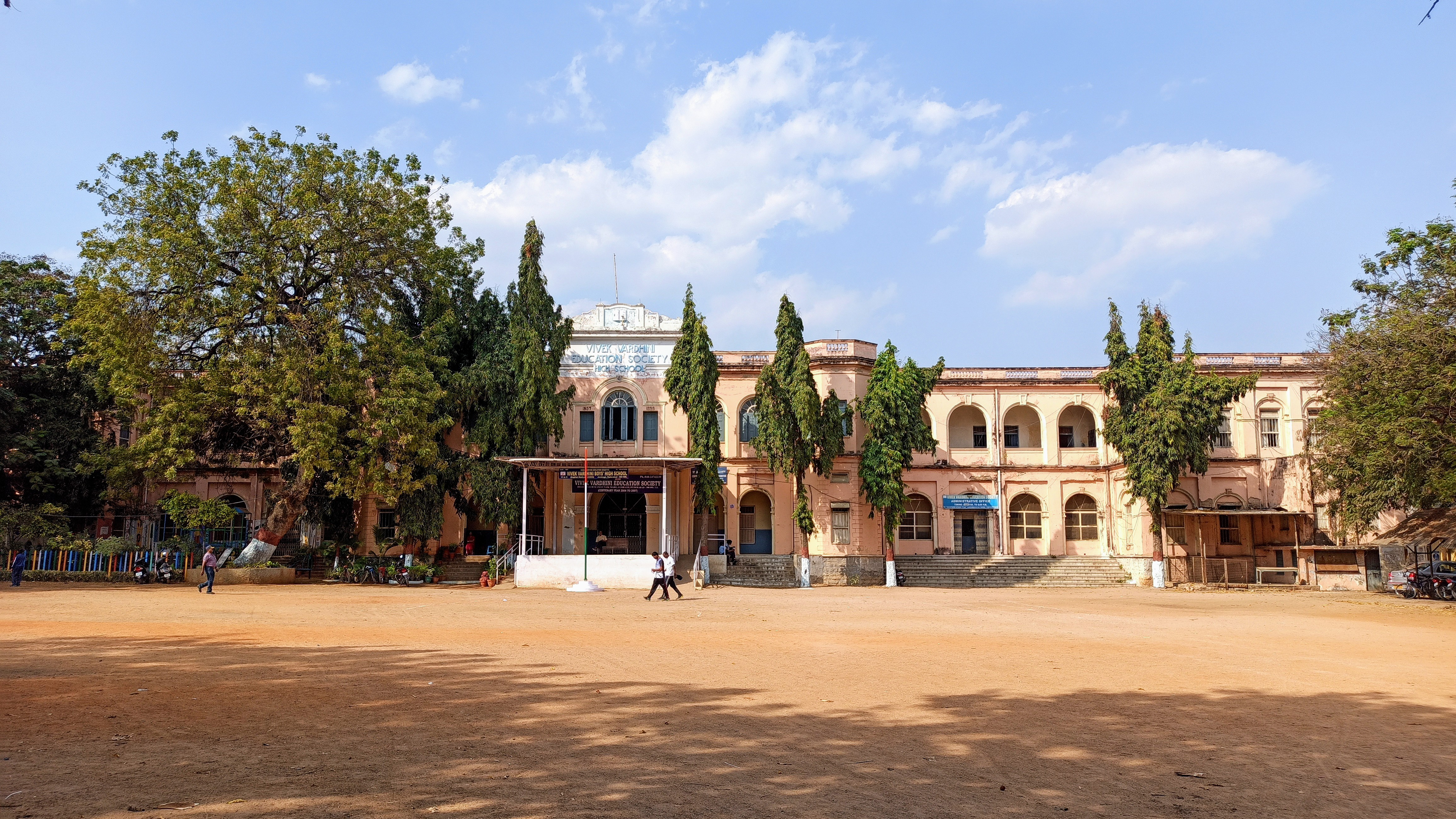
Vivek Vardhini High School Hyderabad, alma mater of Bhattacharya during his early years

Bhattacharya's father, Baikuntha Nath Bhattacharya, was employed with the Nizam's State Railway in Hyderabad, while his mother, Charubala Devi, was a homemaker. In 1937, at the age of seven, Bhattacharya moved to Hyderabad with his family, which had migrated there due to his father's employment in the railway service. Coming from a Bengali Brahmin background, the family settled in the culturally diverse city, where Urdu held official status. He enrolled at Vivek Vardhini High School, completing his early education up to class five. Immersed in an Urdu-speaking environment, he developed a deep affinity for the language while also gaining familiarity with Telugu and Tamil. He later joined Mahbub College High School in Secunderabad, where he studied English and Urdu and resided in the hostel. He passed his secondary examination in 1948–49, but financial limitations after his father's retirement prevented him from pursuing higher education.

At the age of 20, Bhattacharya joined the Telangana Peasant Armed Struggle, which inspired his first Urdu novel, Dharti se Aakash Tak (From the Earth to the Sky), serialized in a Mumbai-based Urdu newspaper. By 1953, he was contributing regular columns to Hyderabad’s Urdu press. Following his father's death in 1955, he moved to Kolkata in search of employment.

In Kolkata, he served as the editor of the Urdu weekly Film Weekly for nearly two years. In 1965, he was appointed as an Urdu translator and English proofreader in the Department of Information and Public Relations under the Government of West Bengal, where he worked until his retirement in 1988. Between 1974 and 1978, he was deputed to the Government of India and held various roles including Assistant Information Officer.

== Literary contributions ==
Bhattacharya played a key role in promoting Urdu literature in Bengal. His first collection of short stories, Raah Ka Kaanta, was published in 1960. Over the years, he authored numerous works that explored the relationship between Urdu and Bengali, and highlighted the contribution of Bengali-speaking communities to Urdu literature.

His most acclaimed work, Bengali Hinduon ki Urdu Khidmaat (1963), examined the literary contributions of Bengali Hindus to Urdu and earned him the Rabindra Puraskar. He also produced instructional materials to teach Urdu to Bengali speakers, engaged in comparative linguistics, and wrote critical essays on Ghalib, Tagore, and Nazrul. He translated several major Bengali works into Urdu, such as Arogya Niketan by Tarashankar Bandyopadhyay (translated as Gulshan-e-Sehat), and Chander Pahar (translated as Chānd kā Pahāṛ) by Bibhutibhushan Bandyopadhyay. He also translated Urdu literature into Bengali.

Some of his books became part of the M.A. Urdu syllabus at University of Calcutta, and he also served as an M.Phil. examiner at Jawaharlal Nehru University. Bhattacharya was appointed News Editor when Urdu news broadcasts were launched on Doordarshan Kolkata. He also served as President of the West Bengal chapter of Anjuman-i Taraqqi-i Urdu.

== Honours and recognition ==
Bhattacharya received numerous accolades throughout his life. He was highly regarded by leading linguists such as Suniti Kumar Chatterji and Sukumar Sen. In 1966, he was conferred the Rabindra Puraskar by the Government of West Bengal for his original research work Bengali Hinduon ki Urdu Khidmaat. The book was widely praised, and Chatterji informally addressed him as "Doctor" in appreciation of his scholarship.

In 1967, Bhattacharya received an honorary doctorate in literature (Daktoor-e-Adab) from Oriental College, Bombay, for his bibliographic work Tazkirah-e-Tasanif-e-Bangāla, which catalogued Urdu publications up to the 19th century.

In 1991, he was awarded the Sahitya Akademi Translation Prize for his Urdu translation of Arogya Niketan by Tarashankar Bandyopadhyay.

== Death ==
Bhattacharya died of cardiac arrest in Kolkata on 15 September 1993 at the age of 63.
