= Dušan Zbavitel =

Czech indologist and translator (1925–2012)

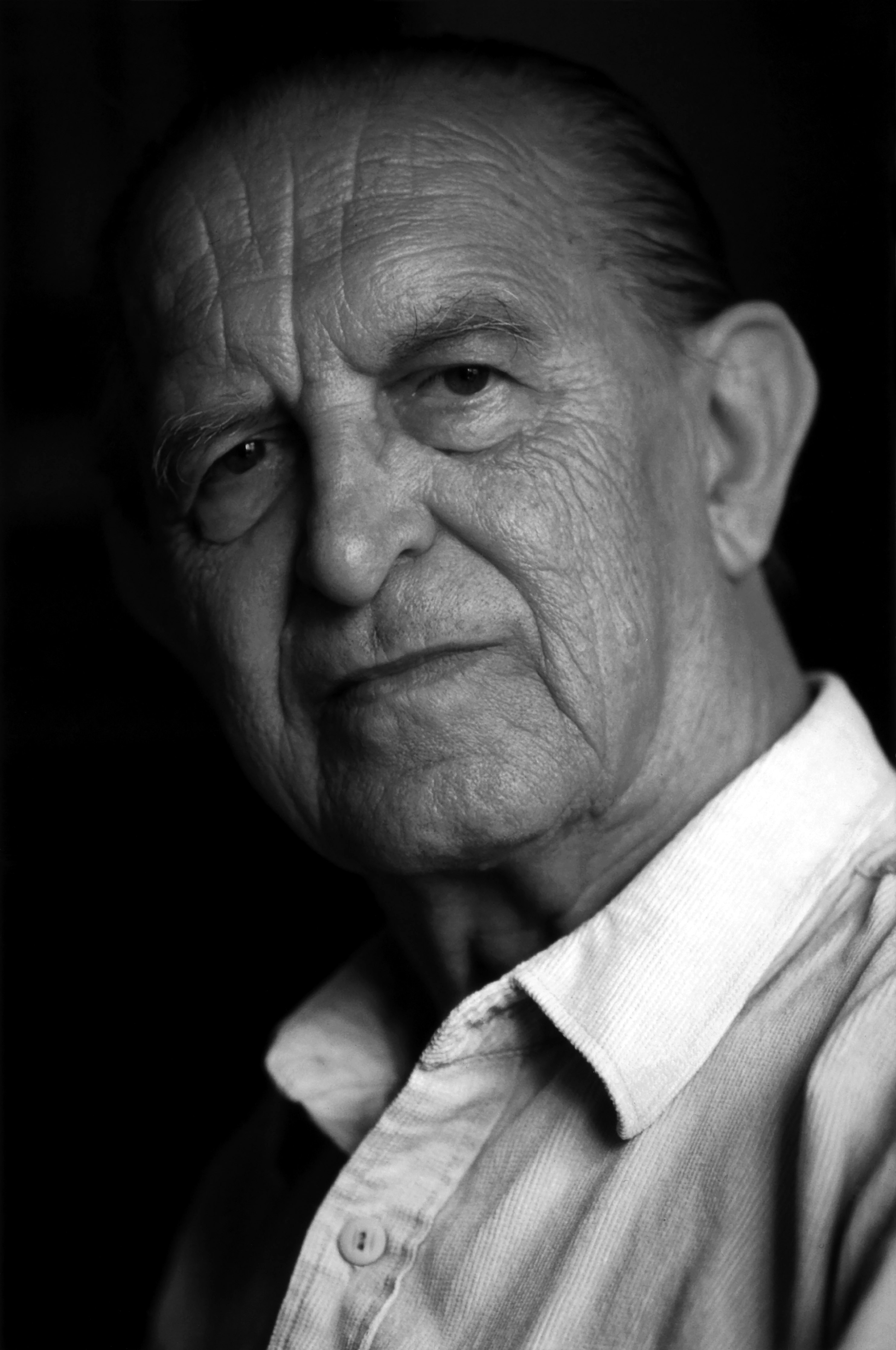
- Born: 7 May 1925; Košice, Czechoslovakia
- Died: 7 August 2012 (aged 87); Prague, Czech Republic
- Education: Charles University
- Awards: Padma Bhushan (2006); Tagore Memorial Award (1987)
- Scientific career
- Fields: Indology
- Workplaces: Oriental Institute of the Czechoslovak Academy of Sciences
- Doctoral students: Hana Preinhaelterová

Dušan Zbavitel (7 May 1925 – 7 August 2012) was a Czech indologist.

== Life ==
Dušan Zbavitel studied Indology with Professor Vincenc Lesný at Charles University in Prague in 1945–1948. After defending his CSc (Candidate of Sciences) dissertation in Bengali literature (1954), he started as a researcher at the Oriental Institute of the Czechoslovak Academy of Sciences. He remained there until being forced out for political reasons in 1971 during the period of Communist "normalization" that followed the Soviet-led invasion of Czechoslovakia in 1968. After 1971, he worked as a freelance translator, and in 1978 he started as a teacher of Sanskrit and Bengali at the School of Languages in Prague. He was active as an author and translator until the last days of his life. He translated from Sanskrit, Pali, Bengali, English and German.

== Literary oeuvre ==
Zbavitel specialized in Bengali literature, winning international acclaim in this field. His most quoted literary works include a study of East Bengal folk ballads (Bengali Folk Ballads from Mymensingh and the Question of their Authenticity) and a comprehensive history of Bengali literature ("Bengali Literature") published in 1976 in the prestigious publication History of Indian Literature edited by Jan Gonda. In addition to these monographs, the international research community has praised Zbavitel's numerous magazine articles (of which he wrote more than 100) such as a series of papers on Rabindranath Tagore, the beginnings of modern Bengali drama and studies of baromasi, a specific genre of medieval and folk Bengali literature. Zbavitel's prominence in this field is highlighted by his appointment first as a team member for the project The Dictionary of Oriental Literature and then as editor-in-chief of its second volume devoted to south Asian literature, which was published in London in 1974.

Zbavitel was an Indologist in the Czech Republic. He published works while under the Czechoslovakia regime. He authored or co-authored specialized and popular books and edited collective works on Czech Indology. Zbavitel translated books from Indian languages and contributed to magazines and journals.

Zbavitel educated several generations of Czech Indologists. While still just a researcher at the Oriental Institute of the Czechoslovak Academy of Sciences, he taught Bengali at the Faculty of Arts, Charles University (1950–1968). He was not permitted to continue for political reasons after 1968, and was only able to return after the fall of the Communist regime (1989). In 1990, he rejoined the faculty, teaching the history of Sanskrit and Bengali literature, ancient Indian poetry and Hinduism and leading courses in the advanced reading of Sanskrit and Bengali texts. He also authored language textbooks and other pedagogical texts.

Zbavitel also translated from English and German. In total, he wrote or translated over 200 books, among others: Paul Williams and Anthony Tribe, Buddhist Thought: A Complete Introduction to the Indian Tradition; Michael Jordan, Buddha; Deepak Chopra, Buddha: A Story of Enlightenment; Tom Lowenstein, The Vision of Buddha; Hans Küng and Heinrich von Stietencron, Christentum und Weltreligionen: Hinduismus; Hans Küng and Heinz Bechert, Christentum und Weltreligionen: Buddhismus; Dalai Lama, The Collected Statements, Articles and Interviews of His Holiness The XIV Dalai Lama; Dalai Lama, How to Expand Love; Dalai Lama, Many Ways to Nirvana; Dalai Lama, How To Practice the Way to a Meaningful Life; John Powers, Introduction to Tibetan Buddhism; Michael Keene, World Religions; Sogyal Rinpoche, The Tibetan Book of Living and Dying; J. R. Porter, Jesus Christ, The Jesus of History, The Christ of Faith; Jacob Newman and Gavriel Sivan, Judaism A-Z Illustrated: Lexicon of Terms & Concepts.

== Awards and honors ==
Zbavitel received many awards at home and in India for his research and translations. He received the Tagore Memorial Award from the Government of West Bengal for his History of Bengali Literature in 1977, the title Lokaratna for his contribution to folklore research (1981) and the Rabindratattvacharya award for his studies on Rabindranath Tagore (1987). In 2006, he received India's third highest civilian award, the Padma Bhushan, for his lifetime achievements. His Czech and Czechoslovak awards included the State Award for Translated Work in 2004.

International and Czech Bengalists together published a special edition of the journal Archiv Orientální on the occasion of Zbavitel's 75th birthday.

== Selected bibliography ==
=== Monographs ===
- Oriental Studies in Czechoslovakia. Prague: Orbis, 1959. Also translated into German, French and Russian.
- Rabíndranáth Thákur: Vývoj básníka. Praha: Orbis, 1961.
- Bengali Folk-Ballads from Mymensingh and the Problem of their Authenticity. Calcutta: University of Calcutta, 1963.
- Non-Finite Verbal Forms in Bengali. Prague: Academia, 1970.
- Bangladéš: Stát, který se musel zrodit. Prague: ČTK, Pressfoto, 1973.
- Bengali Literature. Wiesbaden: Harrassowitz, 1976.
- Jedno horké indické léto. Praha: Panorama, 1982. Translated into Russian as: Odno zharkoye indiskoye leto. Moscow: Nauka, 1986.
- Starověká Indie. Praha: Panorama, 1985.
- Hinduismus a jeho cesty k dokonalosti. Praha: DharmaGaia, 1993. ISBN 80-901225-5-8.
- Otazníky starověké Indie. Praha: Nakladatelství Lidové noviny, 1997. ISBN 80-7106-241-3.
- Bengálská literatura: Od tantrických písní k Rabíndranáthu Thákurovi. Praha: ExOriente, 2008. ISBN 978-80-904246-0-9.

=== Collective works ===
- Pohádka o písni a jiné indické povídky. Praha: SNKL, 1953.
- DZ, Erich Herold a Kamil Zvelebil. Indie zblízka. Praha: Orbis, 1960.
- DZ a Jan Marek. Dvakrát Pákistán. Praha: Orbis, 1964. Translated into German as: Zweimal Pakistan. Leipzig: Brockhaus, 1966. Translated into Russian as: Dva Pakistana. Moscow: Nauka, 1966.
- Bozi, bráhmani, lidé: Čtyři tisíciletí hinduismu. Praha: Nakladatelství Československé akademie věd, 1964. Translated into Russian as: Bogi, brakhmany, lyudi. Moscow: Nauka, 1969.
- Slovník spisovatelů Asie a Afriky. Praha: Odeon, 1967.
- Moudrost a umění starých Indů. Praha: Odeon, 1971.
- Dictionary of Oriental Literatures. Vol. 2: South and South-East Asia. London: Allen and Unwin, 1973.
- Setkání a proměny. Praha: Odeon, 1976. Translated into Polish as: Spotkania i przemiany. Warsaw: Panstwo wydav., 1983.
- Bohové s lotosovýma očima: Hinduistické mýty v indické literatuře tří tisíciletí. Praha: Vyšehrad, 1986. 2nd ed. 1997. ISBN 80-7021-215-2.
- DZ a Dana Kalvodová. Pod praporem krále nebes: Divadlo v Indii. Praha: Odeon, 1987.
- DZ a Jaroslav Vacek. Průvodce dějinami staroindické literatury. Třebíč: Arca JiMfa, 1996. ISBN 80-85766-34-5.
- DZ, Miloslav Krása, Dagmar Marková. Indie a Indové: Od dávnověku k dnešku. Praha: Vyšehrad, 1997. ISBN 80-7021-216-0.
- Základní texty východních náboženství. Sv. 1: Hinduismus. Praha: Argo, 2007. ISBN 978-80-7203-846-6.
- Základní texty východních náboženství. Sv. 2: Raný indický buddhismus. Praha: Argo, 2008. ISBN 978-80-7203-916-6.

=== Textbooks ===
- Učebnice bengálštiny. Praha: Nakladatelství Československé akademie věd, 1953.
- Lehrbuch des Bengalischen. Heidelberg: J. Groos, 1970. 2nd ed. 1989, 3rd ed. 1996. ISBN 978-3-87276-142-2.
- Bengálština. Praha: SPN, 1971.
- Sanskrt. Brno: UJEP, 1987.
- DZ a Jaroslav Strnad. Učebnice sanskrtu. Praha: Karolinum, 2006. ISBN 80-246-1200-3. (Revised and expanded textbook of 1987.), 2nd rev. ed. 2012.

=== Translations from Bengali ===
- Odpor: Výbor z povídek mladých bengálských autorů. Praha: Československý spisovatel, 1951.
- Bhattáčárja, Sukánta. Písně hladu a revoluce. Praha: Mladá fronta, 1953.
- Thákur, Rabíndranáth. Pouť za člověkem. Praha: SNKLHU, 1954.
- Bandjopádhjáj, Mánik. Plavec na řece Padmě. Praha: Československý spisovatel, 1954.
- Bengálské milostné balady. Praha: SNKLHU, 1956. Translated into German as: Bengalische Balladen. Leipzig: Insel-Verlag, 1977.
- Thákur, Rabíndranáth. Básně a veršovaná dramata. Praha: Státní nakladatelství krásné literatury, hudby a umění, 1958. (Spisy Rabíndranatha Thákura, sv. 1; The Rabindranath Tagore Collected Works, vol. 1)
- Thákur, Rabíndranáth. Gora. Dvě sestry. Praha: SNKLHU, 1959 (Spisy Rabíndranatha Thákura, sv. 2; The Rabindranath Tagore Collected Works, vol. 2)
- Thákur, Rabíndranáth. Povídky, essaye a projevy. Praha: SNKLHU, 1960. (Spisy Rabíndranatha Thákura, sv. 3; The Rabindranath Tagore Collected Works, vol. 3)
- Thákur, Rabíndranáth. Poslední báseň. Praha: SNKLU, 1961. 2nd ed.: Praha: Vyšehrad, 2000. ISBN 80-7021-450-3.
- Ishák, Ábu. Začarovaný dům. Praha: SNKLU, 1962.
- Thákur, Rabíndranáth. Země karet. Praha: NČVU, 1962.
- Bandjopádhjáj, Mánik. Tanec loutek. Praha: SNKLU, 1964.
- Gangopádhjáj, Narájan. Vzdušné zámky. Praha: Odeon, 1967.
- Thákur, Rabíndranáth. Gítáňdžali. Praha: Supraphon, 1973.
- Valíulláh, Said. Strom bez kořenů. Praha: Odeon, 1974.
- Thákur, Rabíndranáth. Muž a žena. Praha: Odeon, 1976. 2nd ed.: Praha: Vyšehrad, 2000. ISBN 80-7021-382-5.
- Bandjopádhjáj, Bibhútibhúšan. Píseň o cestě. Praha: Mladá fronta, 1978. 2nd rev. and enl. ed.: Praha: ExOriente, 2010. ISBN 978-80-904246-6-1.
- Basu, Samareš. Pouť za nektarem nesmrtelnosti. Praha: Odeon, 1982.
- Thákur, Rabíndranáth. Na břehu řeky Zapomnění. Praha: BB/art, 2005. ISBN 80-7341-694-8
- Šankar. Lidská džungle. Praha: ExOriente, 2011. ISBN 978-80-904246-7-8.

=== Translations from Sanskrit and Pali ===
- Sómadéva. Oceán příběhů. 2 sv. Praha: Odeon, 1981.
- Rámájana. Praha: Argo, 2000. ISBN 80-7203-264-X. 2nd ed. 2015. ISBN 978-80-257-1410-2.
- Kautiljova Arthašástra, aneb, Učebnice věcí světských. Praha: Arista, 2001. ISBN 80-86410-02-1.
- Upanišady. Praha: DharmaGaia, 2004. ISBN 80-86685-34-9.
- O copatých mniších, šibalech a nevěrných manželkách: příběhy ze staré Indie. Praha: Knižní klub, 2007. ISBN 978-80-242-1718-5.
- Džátaky: Příběhy z minulých životů Buddhy. 2nd enl. ed. Praha: DharmaGaia, 2007. ISBN 978-80-86685-75-5.
- Mánavadharmašástra, aneb, Manuovo ponaučení o dharmě. Praha: ExOriente, 2009. ISBN 978-80-904246-5-4.
