= Satinath Bhaduri =

Indian novelist and politician

Satinath Bhaduri (27 September 1906 – 30 March 1965) was a Bengali Indian novelist and politician. He was known by his literary pseudonym, Chitra Gupta.

== Early life and career ==
He was born on 27 September 1904

in Purnea, Bengal Presidency, where Indubhusan Bhaduri, his father, practised law. His ancestral home was in Krishnanagar in the district of Nadia. He obtained an MA degree in economics from the University of Patna in 1930. In 1931 he completed his BL degree. He started practising law at Patna between 1932 and 1939. He then joined Indian National Congress and became a district secretary of Purnia. He was imprisoned in Bhagalpur Jail twice: 1940–41 and 1942–45. In 1948, he fell out with the Congress and joined the Socialist Party.

== His works ==
Satinath's first novel was Jagari (1946), for which he received the very first Rabindra Puraskar (1950). This book earned him considerable fame, and was translated into English in 1965 as part of the UNESCO Collection of Representative Works. As a political novel, Jagari occupies a unique place in Bengali literature. He also wrote a travelogue, Satyi Bhraman Kahini (1951), about his experiences in Paris. His other noteworthy works include Gananayak (1948), Chitragupter File (1949), Dhorai Charita Manas (2 parts, 1949, 1951), Achin Ragini (1954), Aparichita (1954), Sangkat (1957), Alok Drsti (1964), Paruyar Notebook (collection of writings) etc.

== Critical appreciation ==
Partha Chatterjee in his celebrated work The Politics of the Governed analyses the narrative of Dhorai charita manas which according to Chatterjee could be read as 'a faithful ethnography of colonial governance and national movement in India'

== Themes ==
His short stories are satirical critique of judiciary, partisan politics, crude feminism etc. It is very difficult or almost impossible to analyze the parody-texts or these black comedies as critiques cannot make comments on self-avowed institutionalized organized funded science or anatomo-bio politics of lab-state science, survey techniques, statistics etc. The critical analysis of Bhaduri's discourse led to parody of parodies. A critique could cut a sorry figure to gauge the story-line with standardized as well as presupposed formalized tool. Bhaduri's stories are the instances of double session, where the existing civil and political society and the stereotypical literary critiques are at a time attacked with subtle wit. Bhaduri declared the death of model-theoretic formularized criticism.

Most of his writings portray the lifestyle of the people of Bengal and eastern Bihar.

== Death ==
He died on 30 March 1965.

== See also ==
- Sunirmal Basu
