= Ajoy Home =

Indian ornithologist and author (1913–1992)

- Born: May 2, 1913; Calcutta, British India
- Died: October 30, 1992 (aged 79); Calcutta, India
- Occupations: aviculturist, ornithologist and naturalist
- Notable work: author of several books on ornithology

Ajoy Home (2 May 1913 – 30 October 1992) was a Bengali aviculturist, ornithologist and naturalist of India, based in the eastern state of West Bengal. The Archana Award was conferred upon him by the Bangiya Sahitya Parishad on 24 July 1992. He was also awarded the Rabindra Puraskar, the highest honorary literary award from the state of West Bengal, posthumously by the Government of West Bengal on 3 June 1996 for his book "Chena Achena Pakhi" (lit. 'Birds Known and Unknown').

== Early life and family history ==
The Brahmo family of Ajoy Home originally hailed from Mymensingh in modern-day Bangladesh, who later settled in Calcutta. Ajoy Home was born in Kolkata (Calcutta) to Brahmo reformer and a teacher at City School, Gagan Chandra and his wife Basantabala. Ajoy was the sixth of his seven siblings. His eldest brother was Amal Chandra Home, the well-known founder-editor of the Calcutta Municipal Gazette and a member of Sukumar Ray's 'Monday club'. Ajoy Home himself studied at the Brahmo Boys School and went on to Vidyasagar College in Calcutta for his undergraduate education. He was married to Suparna, also of a Brahmo family hailing from Shillong, in the year 1947, and she predeceased him on 4 February 1987.

== Career ==
Home was the author of several books on ornithology written in his vernacular Bengali: Banglar Pakhi (Birds of Bengal, with a cover-design by the Indian film-maker Satyajit Ray, who happened to be a family friend), Chena Achena Pakhi (Birds known and unknown) that won him a posthumous Rabindra Puroshkar, awarded by the Government of West Bengal in 1996. His other works include Bichitra Jeeb-jontu (A plethora of animals), and the sci-fi tale Moron Ghum (The Deathly Sleep) etc.

Home wrote for several Indian wild life journals, and also contributed regularly to various well-known Bengali-language magazines and periodicals of the time, including Sandesh (a magazine for younger readers started by Upendrakishore Ray Chowdhury in 1913), Desh, Kishore Jnan-bijnan - a science magazine for the young, Mahanagar, Aajkaal (a daily newspaper) and others.

Home was appointed librarian of the Indian Statistical Institute by Prasanta Chandra Mahalanobis, where he worked until superannuation.

Although fluent in several languages, Home wrote mainly in his mother tongue, Bengali, motivated by a desire to write for the Bengali speaking masses in his home state of West Bengal, who were so far hamstrung by the scarcity of quality books on ornithology written in Bengali, as mentioned by him in his book Banglar Pakhi.

His books were compiled from information collected during four decades of travel and exploration in the wilderness of eastern India, including the hills and forests of undivided Assam and the remote corners of the Sunderbans, as well as other parts of India.

Home was a founder-member of Prakriti Samsad, a Nature Study group in West Bengal and was a promoter of environmental awareness, wildlife conservation, and birdwatcher groups. He was the founder and editor of Prakriti Gyan, a Bengali magazine on nature.

== Personal ==
Home participated in several hobbies apart from his study of birds, in particular playing bridge, attending bridge tournaments all over India.

He was very fond of Rabindrasangeet and was close to Pravas Dey (uncle of the Indian singer Manna Dey). The duo started a music school named ‘Ektara'.

== Death and legacy ==
Home died in Calcutta on 30 October 1992, survived by his only daughter Sutapa. A commemorative event was organized on the centennial of his birth (including the unveiling of his portrait at the Bangiya Bijnan Parishad hall on 2 May 2013).

In popular Bengali culture, a reference to Home's book Banglar Pakhi, is made in Satyajit Ray's detective novel Jahangirer Swarnamudra (The Gold Coins of Jahangir). The sleuth Feluda in the story refers to Ajoy Home's Banglar Pakhi as the definitive book on bird-watching in Bengali and mentions Salim Ali's Birds of India in English, as preparation for the supporting character Lalmohan Ganguly to pass himself off as a bird-watcher.

== Books ==
- Banglar Pakhi (Birds of Bengal) By Ajoy Home, Birth Centenary Edition, Jan2015 Publisher-Dey's Publishing,ISBN 978-81-295-2325-9
- Chena Achena Pakhi (Birds known and unknown)
- Bichitra Jeeb-jontu (A plethora of animals)
- Moron Ghum (The Deathly Sleep)

== Sources ==
- "Shotoborshey Pokkhi Premi",(Bird lover in centenary year) by Ashok Sengupta, Ananda Bazar Patrika, 11 August 2012 edition.
- "Kamon Chhilen Prokritipremi Ajoy Home" (What Was Naturalist Ajoy Home Like?) By Dipak Kumar Dawn, Ekhon Aranyak, July - August Issue, 2012.
- Radio interview of Smt. Sutapa Roychowdhury about Ajoy Home onAkashbani, ANWESHA, Kolkata. Host: Manas Pratim Das. Broadcast on 13 September 2012.
- "Pakkhibid Ajoy Home: Janmosatobarsha"(Ornithologist Ajoy Home: Birth Centenary Year)- by Goutam Neogy, Kalantar Autumn Annual 2012, October 2012, Pages 126 to 128.
- "Shotoborsheyr Aloy Ajoy Home" (Ajoy Home: Focus in centenary year. by Arup Chowdhury, Banyapran 4th. issue 2013, Pages 45 to 49.
- Radio broadcast, "Ajoy Home & Satyacharan Laha", Dipak Kumar Dawn on Akashbani radio, 13 and 14 February 2013. Kolkata.
- "Pokkhibisharad Ajoy Home O Kichu Ajana Katha" (Ornithologist Ajoy Home : a few unknown facts)-by Sutapa Roy Chowdhury. Bi- monthly Annyadin , Volume 5 Issue 5. 16–28 February 2013.
- onmoshotoborshey Ajoy Home (Ajoy Home in centenary year) - By Sumitra Chowdhury, Gyan O Bigyan, Vol.66, No.5. 10 May 2013.
- "Ajoy Home : Ekshatak" (Ajoy Home: Centurion)- "Ayana" feature of Ajkal, 29 April 2013.
- Ornithologist Extraordinary : " Note Book " feature of The Statesman, 6 May 2013.
- "Pokkhipremik" (The lover of Birds): "Kolkatar Karcha" feature of Anandabazar Patrika, 24 June 2013.
- 'Pustak Parichoy' (book review) feature of Ananda Bazar Patrika, Kolkata by Judhajit Dasgupta, Saturday, 21 November 2015, Volume 94 Issue 255, pg. 4.
