= Jagari =

Novel by Satinath Bhaduri

- Author: Satinath Bhaduri
- Original title: জাগরী
- Translator: Lila Ray
- Language: Bengali
- Genre: Novel
- Published: 1945
- Publication place: India
- English publication date: 1963 (Asia Publishing House, Bombay)
- Media type: Print
- Awards: Rabindra Puraskar (1950)
- OCLC: 319683269

Jagari or Jagori (Bengali: জাগরী, English: "The Vigil" or "Awake") is a Bengali novel written by Satinath Bhaduri. The novel is considered to be a master-piece of Indian literature and it was first published in 1945. It is a semi-autobiographical novel and it is set in the 1940s's during the Quit India Movement.

== Plot ==
The novel is written in first-person narrative, but from four different people's point of view. During India's freedom movement Bilu, an Indian revolutionary is sentenced to death. The novel starts in the jail custody at the last night before the convict is to be hanged. The first chapter is written from that Bilu's perspective, where he narrates his own life and experiences. It also tells the inhuman trials and tortures he faced. The second, third and fourth chapter narrate the same story from his father, mother and brother's perspectives. All of them await the capital punishment while explaining their own thoughts, anxiety and experiences.

== Theme ==
The novel is written in the background of the Quit India Movement (1942). It narrates common Bengali people's involvement in India's freedom movement. Satinath Bhaduri had direct experience of contemporary Indian politics and the Quit India movement. He added many autobiographical elements in the plot.

== Publication ==
The novel was first published in 1945. It was author's debut novel. Right after the publication it became popular among Bengali readers. Sisir Kumar Das, in his book History of Indian Literature: 1911-1956, struggle for freedom : triumph and tragedy wrote that this novel is "one of the finest political novel" written in Bengali. In a 2014 Scroll.in article, the novel was included in one of the "five must-read books of Bengali literature".

== Awards ==
The book received the following awards:

- Rabindra Puraskar award from the West Bengal government (1950)
