= Paul Detienne =

Father Detienne
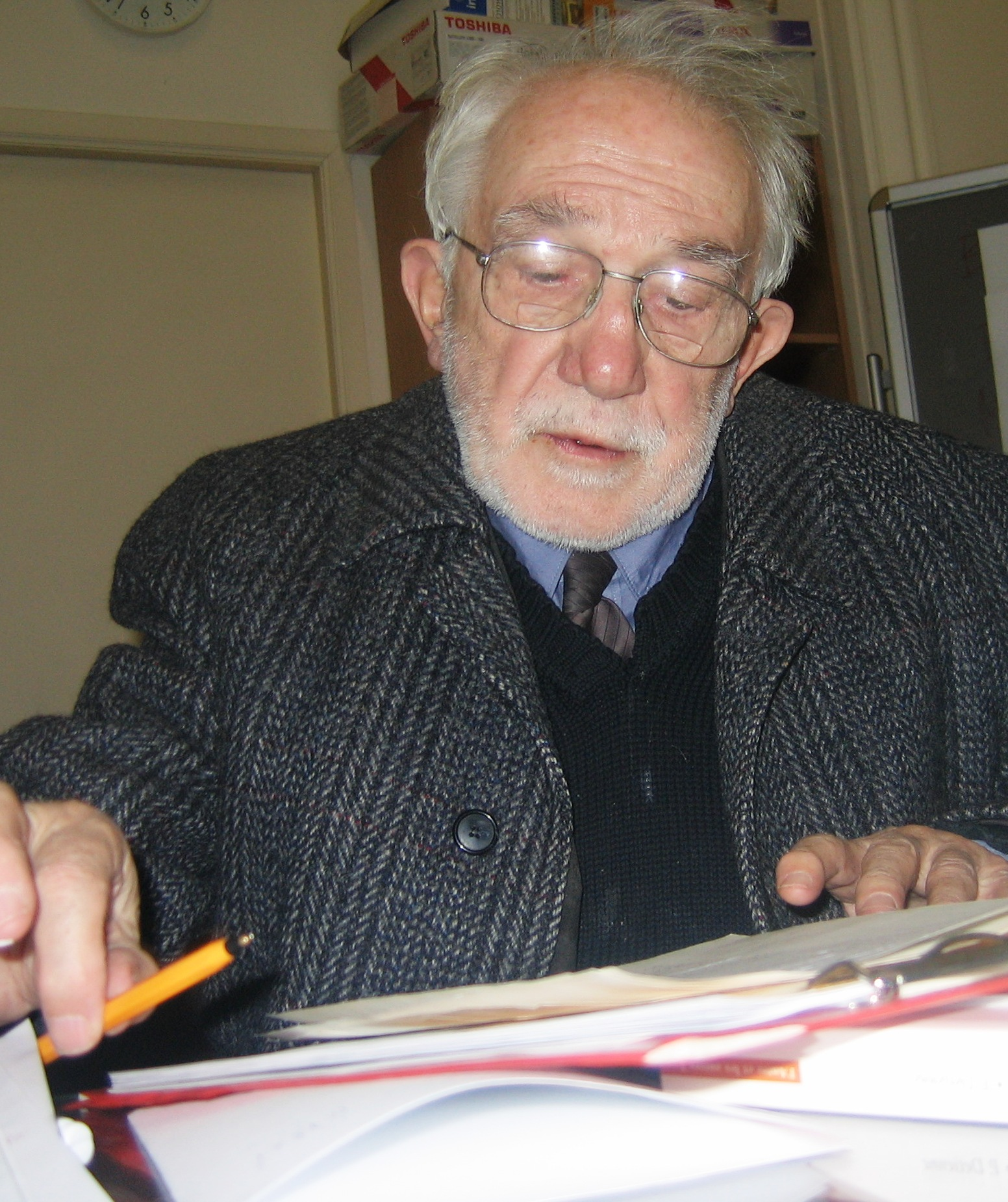
- Father Detienne in Brussels, 2006
- Born: Paul Detienne; 30 December 1924; Rochefort, Belgium
- Died: 31 October 2016; Brussels, Belgium.
- Citizenship: Belgian
- Occupations: priest; chaplain; essayist; critic; translator

Paul Detienne (30 December 1924, Rochefort, Belgium – 31 October 2016, Brussels) was a Belgian Jesuit priest, noted for his literary endeavours in the Bengali language.

He began his religious training in the early 1940s and arrived in West Bengal in 1949, where he stayed until 1977. He studied Bengali language and literature at St Xavier’s College, Kolkata and at Santiniketan and went on to become a noted writer of Bengali in his own right. He is best known for his column Diaryr Chhenra Pata (ডায়েরির ছেঁড়াপাতা,Torn Pages of My Diary) which first appeared in the premiere Bengali literary magazine Desh and ran on and off for many years. They were eventually compiled into a book. Other diaristic books he published include Atpoure Dinpanjee (আটপৌরে দিনপঞ্জি) and Rojnamcha (রোজনামচা) as well as the compilation Godyo Songraha (গদ্য সংগ্রহ).

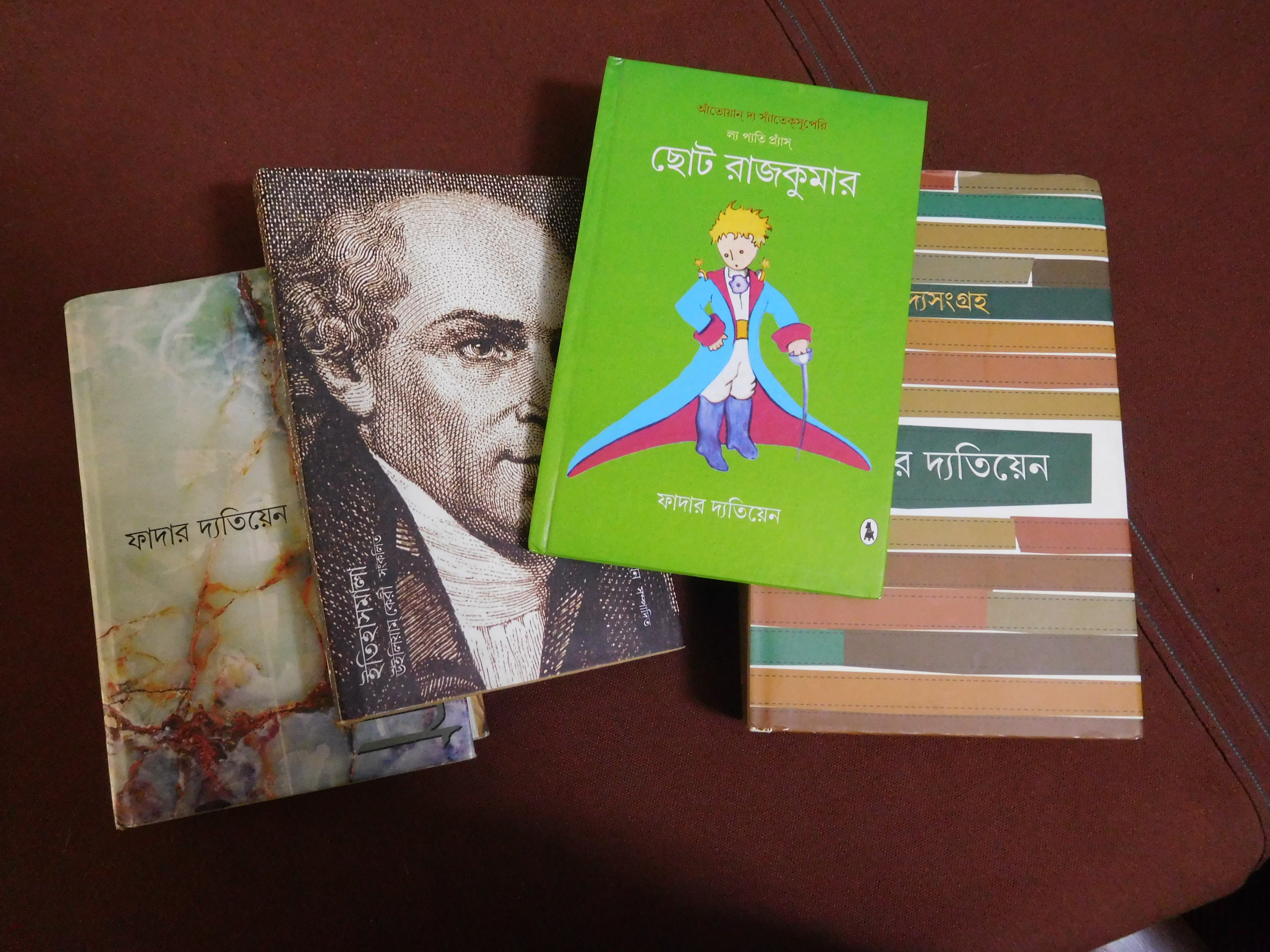
Bengali writings of Father Detienne

Father Detienne is credited with rescuing the Bengali Itihasmala (ইতিহাসমালা) by William Carey, the 18th-century missionary who did pioneering work on the Bengali language. He also translated writers such as Saint-Exupéry and Mircea Eliade into Bengali. His life's work was rewarded by the Paschimbanga Bangla Academy in 2010, when he won the prestigious Rabindra Smriti Puroshkar.

He returned to Belgium in 1977 and worked as hospital chaplain till retirement in 1989. He collaborated also with the Belgian Jesuit theological journal Nouvelle revue théologique as a book reviewer. He reviewed approximately 800 books in 20 years, which are available online.

Paul Detienne died in Brussels on the 31 October 2016.

== Literary prizes ==
- Narasingha Das Puroshkar 1972
- Rabindra Smriti Purashkar 2010
