= Rabindra Puraskar =

Literary award

The Rabindra Puraskar (also Rabindra Smriti Puraskar) is the highest honorary literary award given in the Indian state of West Bengal. This award is named after the famous Indian poet Rabindranath Tagore and is administered by the Government of West Bengal under the aegis of the Paschimbanga Bangla Academy (Bengali Academy of West Bengal), Kolkata.The award is given for creative literature, non-fiction and books about Bengal in Bengali as well as other languages.

From 1950 to 1982 this award was conferred on one or more writers for a particular outstanding work of him. From 1983 to 2003 this award was conferred to one or more writers as a recognition of their lifetime achievement. In 2004 and 2005, again this award was conferred on one or more writers for a particular outstanding work. Since 2006 this award again is being conferred to one or more writers as a recognition of their lifetime achievement. Sisir Kumar Das is missing from the list. He got the award twice, in 1976 and 1987.

== Recipients ==
=== 1950–1959 ===
Year	Name	Work
1950	Satinath Bhaduri	Jagari (Novel)
1950	Niharranjan Ray	Bangalir Itihaas: Adi Parvaسر (History)
1951	Bibhutibhushan Bandopadhyay (Posthumous)	Ichhamati (Novel)
1951	Jogesh Chandra Ray Vidyanidhi	Indian Ancient Life (History)
1952	Brajendranath Bandyopadhyay	Sangbadpatre Sekaler Katha, Bangla Samayik Patra, Sahitya-Sadhak-Charitmala etc. (History of Bengali Literature)
1952	Dr Kalipada Biswas & Ekkadi Ghosh	Bharater Banaushadhi (Ayurveda)
1953	Bangalir Saraswat Abadaan: Bange Nabyanyay-Charcha (History of Sanskrit Literature)	
1954	Rani Chanda	Purna Kumbha (Travelogue)
1955	Parashuram	Krishnakali Ityadi Galpa (Short Stories)
1955	Tarashankar Bandopadhyay	Arogya Niketan (Novel)
1956	Samarendranath Sen	
1957	Dr Ramesh Chandra Majumdar	The History and Culture of the Indian People (History)
1957	Prabhat Kumar Mukhopadhyay	Rabindra Jibani (Tagore Studies)
1958	Premendra Mitra	Sagar Theke Phera (Poetry)
1958	Dr Suniti Kumar Chatterji	Latterature Mediavali & Moderne Del Sub Continente Indiano (History of Literature, Latin)
1958	Binoy Ghosh	Paschimbanger Sanskriti (Bengal Studies)
1959	Upendranath Bhattacharya	Banglar Baul Gaan (Musicology)
1959	Haridas Mukhopadhyay and Uma Mukhopadhyay	Origin of the National Education Movement (History)

=== 1960–1969 ===
Year	Name	Work
1960	Pramathanath Bishi	Carry Saheber Munsi (novel)
1960	Radhagobinda Nath	Goudiya Vaishnava Darshan (Vaishnava philosophy)
1961	Haridas Siddhantabagish	Mahabharat (translation)
1961	Swami Prajnanananda	Historical Development of Indian Music: A Critical Study (music)
1962	Banaphul	Hate Bazare (novel)
1962	Jitendranath Bandyopadhyaya	Panchopasana
1963	Subodh Chandra Chakabarty	Ramyani Vikhsya (travelogue)
1963	Suresh Chandra Bandyopadhyaya	Smritishastre Bangali (history)
1964	Mrityunjoy Prasad Guha	Akash O Prithibi (science)
1964	Bimal Mitra	Kadi Diye Kinlam (novel)
1964	Shankar Nath Roy	Bharater Sadhak (religion)
1965	Sukumar Sen	Bharatiya Shahityer Itihas (history)
1965	Shachindra Nath Bose	Pragaitihasik Manush (anthropology)
1965	Gajendra Kumar Mitra	Paush Faguner Pala (novel)
1966	Ashapurna Devi	Pratham Pratishruti (novel)
1966	Shanti Ranjan Bhattacharya	Bengali Hinduon ki Urdu Khidmaat
1966	Anirvan	Ved Mimansa
1967	Sharadindu Bandyopadhyay	Tungabhadrar Teere (novel)
1967	Kalika Ranjan Kanungo	Rajasthan Kahini (history)
1967	Prabas Jiban Chaudhury	Tagore on Literature and Aesthetics
1968	Kalidas Roy	Purnahuti (poem)
1968	Sukumar Bose	Himalaya (travellogue)
1968	Charu Chandra Sanyal	The Rajbansis of North Bengal (anthropology)
1969	Leela Majumdar	Aar Konokhane
1969	Narayan Sanyal	Aparupa Ajanta (cave painting)
1969	Gopendra Krishna Bose	Bangalar Laukik Debata (folk culture)

=== 1970–1982 ===
Year	Name	Work
1971	Ramapada Chaudhuri	Ekhoni (novel)
1972	Bibhuti Bhushan Mukhopadhyay	Ebar Priyambada (novel)
1972	Paresh Chandra Majumdar	Sanskrita O Prakrita Bhashar Kramabikash (philology)
1973	Jyotirmayi Devi	"Sonarupa Noy" (Collection of Short Stories), Article "Sahityik Jyotirmoyi Devi" -by Rimpa Sarkar, Published on 13 July 2013 in Bartaman Paper (Bengali), Kolkata,
1973	Amalendu Mitra	"Radher Sanskriti" (Stories of Birbhum and their culture)
1974	Buddhadeb Basu	Swagato Biday (poetry)
1974	Dr. Santimay Chatterjee and Enakshi Chatterjee	Paramanu Jignasa (science)
1975	Achintyakumar Sengupta	Uttarayan (poetry)
1975	Gopal Chandra Bhattacharya	Banglar Kitpatanga (entomology)
	Sri Anirvan	Veda Mimamsa
1977	Dušan Zbavitel	Bengali Literature (literary history)
1979	Arun Mitra	Shudhu Rater Shabda Noy (poetry)
1979	Geraldine Forbes	Positivism in Bengal: A Case Study in the Transmission and Assimilation of an Ideology
1981	Binod Bihari Mukhopadhyay (posthumous)	Chitrakar (painting)
1981	Susobhan Sarkar	On the Bengal Renaissance
1982	Dinesh Das	Ram Gache Banobashe (poetry)

=== 1986–2005 ===
Year	Name	Work
1986	Radharani Devi	Aparajita Rachanabali (complete works)
1987	Ramendrakumar Acharyachoudhry	Bramha O Putir Mouri
1989	Shankha Ghosh	Dhum Legechhe Hrit-kamale (poetry)
1989	Ram Basu	
1994	Khudiram Das	Choddosho-Sal-o-Choloman Rabi (Bengali: চোদ্দশ সাল ও চলমান রবি)
1995	Pratul Chandra Rakshit	Periye Elam (autobiography)
1995	Shakti Chattopadhyay (posthumous)	
1996	Ajoy Home (posthumous)	Chena Achena Pakhi (ornithology)
1999	Amitava Dasgupta	Aamaar Nirabota, Aamaar Bhasha (poetry)
1999	Mangalacharan Chattopdhyay	Shreshtha Kobita
2003	Dr. Biswanath Chakraborty	Amake Cheno (Science)
2004	Palash Baran Pal	Bigyan: Byakti, Jukti, Somoy O Somaj (science)
2005	Himani Bannerji	Inventing Subjects: Studies in Hegemony, Patriarchy and Colonialism (literature)
2005	Biman B. Nath	Mohabishwer Prothom Aalo (Science)

=== 2006–2012 ===
Year	Name
2006	Ralph W. Nicholas
2006	Tarun Sanayal
2007	Kazuo Azuma
2007	Nalin Patel
2008	Manibhushan Bhattacharya
2010	Manindra Gupta (Manindra Lal Dasgupta)
2010	Asim Kumar Mukhopadhyay
2010	Sukanya Sinha
2010	Paul Detienne
2011	Amartya Sen
2012	Mridul Dasgupta (literature)
2012	Amit Chaudhuri (other than Bengali)

=== 2013–2018 ===
Year	Name	Work
2013	Ranajit Das	For overall contribution to Bengali poetry.
2014	Dr Sankar Kumar Nath	For "Kolkata Medical College-r Gorar Katha O Pandit Madhusudan Gupta" in Science
2014	Sekhar Bandyopadhyay	For Decolonisation in South Asia: Meanings of Freedom in Post-Independence West Bengal, 1947-52 (London: Routledge, 2009; Hyderabad: Orient Blackswan, 2012)
2014	Debarati Mitra	
2015	Gautam Basu	For "Bengali Poetry"
2018	Boria Majumdar	Eleven Gods and a Billion Indians

=== 2020–Present ===
Year	Name	Work
2022	Shirshendu Mukhopadhyay	For overall contribution
2022	Bikash Sinha	For overall contribution
2022	France Bhattacharya	For overall contribution
2023	Sanjib Chattopadhyay	For overall contribution

== See also ==
- Ananda Puraskar
- Bankim Puraskar
- Sahitya Akademi Award to Bengali Writers
- Bangla Academy Award
