= Prasadpur =

Prasadpur Prosadpur
- Village
- Location of the village Prasadpur (India)
- Coordinates: 22°47′34″N 88°09′08″E
- Country: India
- State: West Bengal
- District: Hooghly

Government
  - Type: Panchayati Raj(India)
  - Body: Panchayet

Population (2011)
  - Total: 1,019

Language
  - Official: Bangla (বাংলা), English
  - Mother tongue: Bengali
  - Dialect: Rarhi (রাঢ়ী)
- Time zone: UTC+5.30 (IST)
- Pin: 712707
- ISO 3166 code: IN-WB
- Vehicle registration: WB
- Website: wb.gov.in

Prasadpur (official name " Prosadpur ") is a village in Haripal (community development block) in Chandannagore subdivision of Hooghly district in West Bengal, India.

== Location ==
Prasadpur is located at 22°47′N 88°09′E. It is situated between Jagatballavpur and Jangipara.

== Transport ==
Prasadpur is 2.5 km apart from Ahilyabai Holkar Road (State Highway 15). Roads of the village are mainly made with red mud.

=== Bus ===
==== Private Bus ====
- 9A Haripal railway station - Bargachia

==== Bus Route Without Number ====
- Rajbalhat - Howrah Station
- Tarakeswar - Bargachia

=== Train ===
Nearest railway station is Bargachia railway station on Howrah-Amta line. It is nearly 10 km away from Prasadpur.

== Demographics ==
Ratio of population
1. Male (47.9%)
2. Female (52.1%)

According to 2011 Census of India total population was 1019, where male population was 488 (47.89%) and female population was 531 (52.11%) among them 652 (63.89%) were literate (Male:315, Female:337). 137 were in age group 0-6 yrs.

== Education ==
A Primary School is situated nearly middle of the village which is established in 1969. There is no high school there.

== Cultural and religious views ==
People of Prosadpur practices mainly Islam and Hinduism. There is a Mosque, an Eidgah and two Temple in here. Prasadpur is famous for Baba Panchananda Temple. (বাবা পঞ্চানন্দ মন্দির)।

Main festivals is Eid and Durga Puja.

Males mainly wear Panjabi, pajamas, Shirt, Dhuti, Lungi and Trousers and females are wear Sari, Churidar and Shalwar kameez.

== Economy ==
Agriculture is the main economic backbone. Irrigation system are moderate. A DVC Canal is present which carries water for agriculture from river Damodar. Groundwater also is used in irrigation purpose.

=== Produced crop ===
- Rice
- Potato
- Jute
- Mustard
- Sesame

=== Produced vegetable ===
- Rubbed Gourd
- Long Bean
- Drumstick
- Palwal or Potol
- Brinjal
- Tomato
- Chicinga or Hopa
- Spinach
- Cabbage
- Cucumber
- Cauliflower
- onion
- Okra

No small or big industries are here.

== Gallery ==
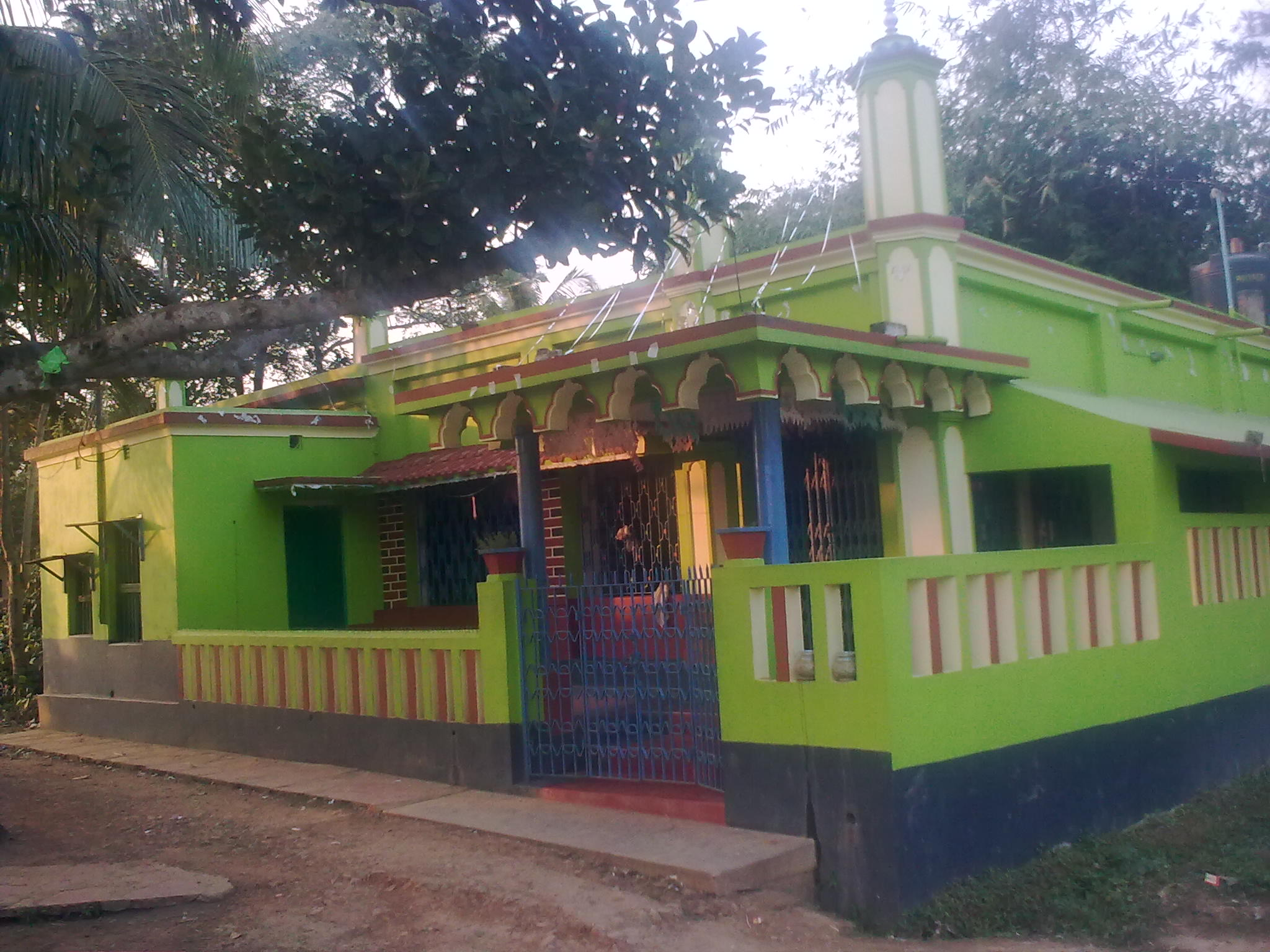
Prasadpur Masjeed

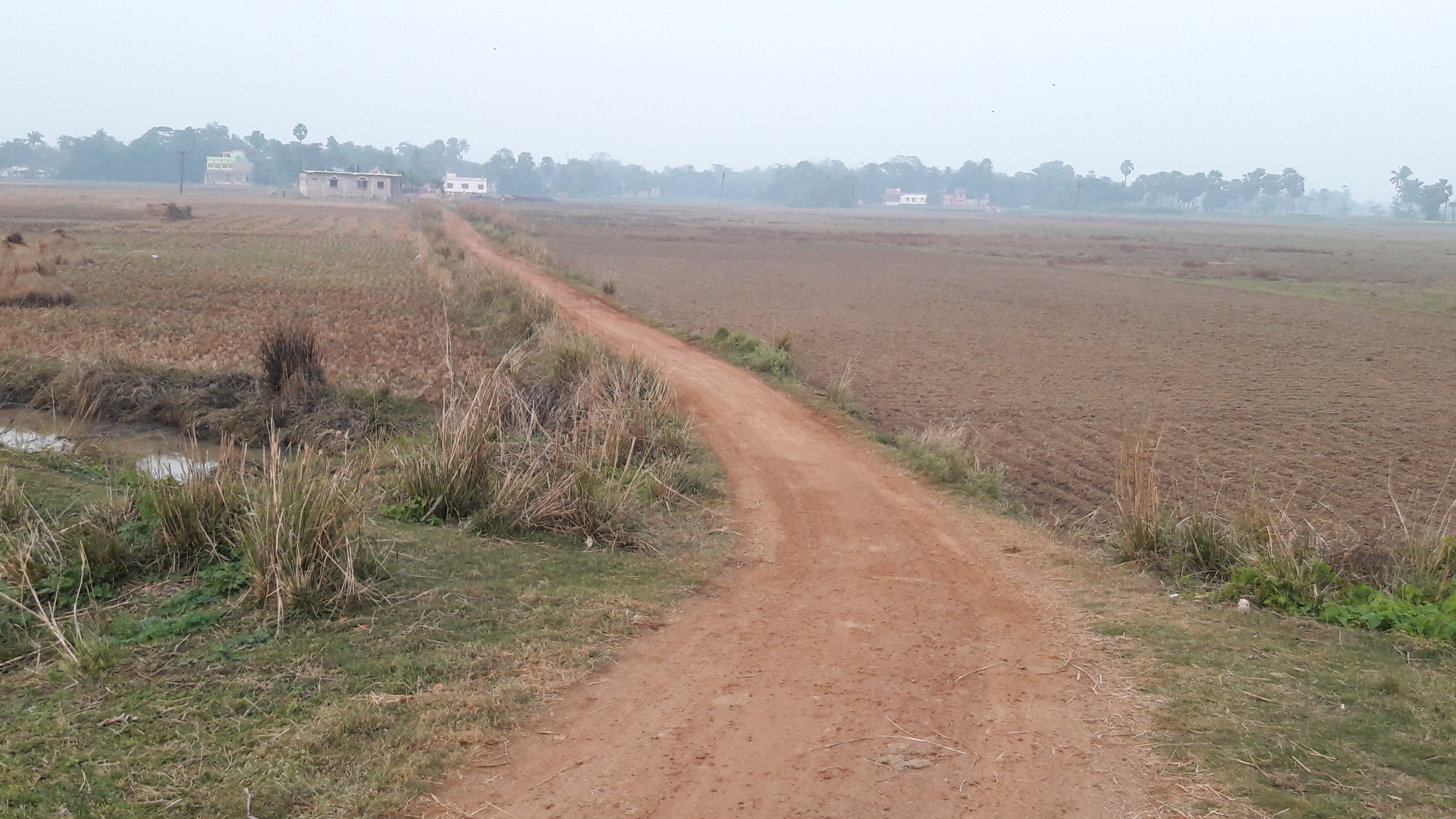
Red mud road of village

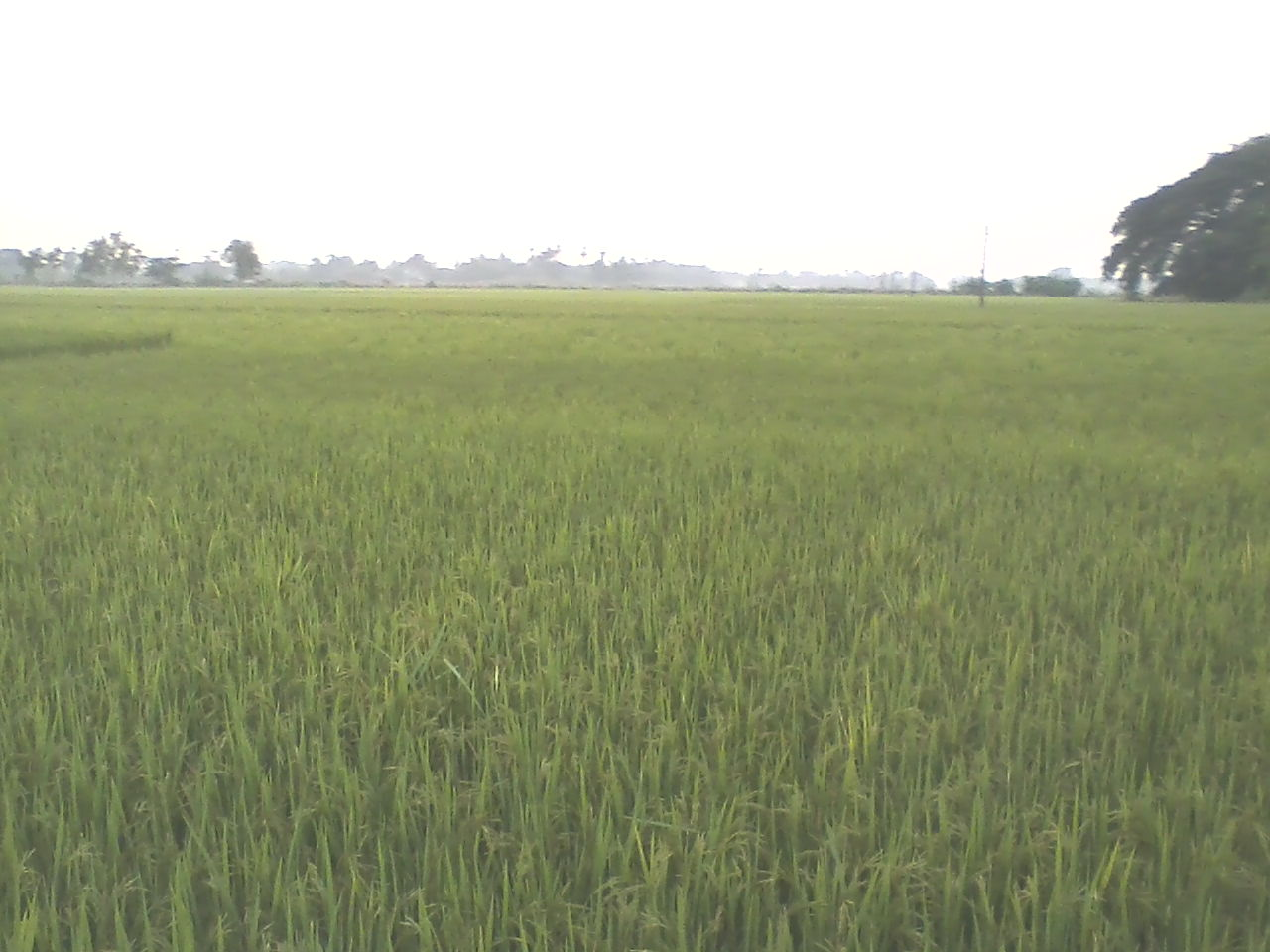
Rice field
