= Pranav =

Hindu concept and male name

Pranav (Sanskrit: प्रणव, romanized: Praṇava) is an Indian male name meaning Om, a sacred sound and symbol. According to Hinduism, pranava is said to be the power of Brahma, Vishnu and Shiva combined. A variation of the name is 'Pranab'.

Pranava is also one of the names of Vishnu, the 409th of the Vishnu Sahasranama.

Notable people with the name include:

- Pranav Pandya (born 1950), Physician
- Pranav Singh (born 1966), Indian politician
- Pranav Kumar Yadav (born 1973), Indian politician
- Pranav Pandya (born 1976), Indian poet
- Pranav Kumar Marpachi (born 1978), Indian politician
- Pranav Mistry (born 1981), Indian computer scientist
- Pranav Ashar (born 1988), Indian VR filmmaker
- Pranav Misshra (born 1989), Indian actor
- Pranav Chaganty (born 1990), Indian rapper
- Pranav Mohanlal (born 1990), Indian actor
- Pranav Sachdev (born 1992), Indian actor
- Pranav Chopra (born 1992), Indian badminton player
- Pranav Gupta (born 1993), Indian cricketer
- Pranav Soorma (born 1994), Indian para-athlete
- Pranav Sharma (born 1994), Astronomer
- Pranav Kumar (born 1999), American tennis player
- Pranav Dhanawade (born 2000), Indian schoolboy cricketer
- Pranav Sivakumar (born 2000), American speller
- Pranav Prince (born 2003), Indian professional basketball player
- Pranav Venkatesh (born 2006), Indian chess grandmaster
- Pranav Anand (born 2006), Indian chess grandmaster
- Pranav Raorane, Indian actor

== Also ==
- Swami Pranavananda (1896-1941), Indian Hindu monk
- Pranavananda Saraswathi (1908-1982), Sri Lankan guru
- Pranava Prakash (born 1979), Indian artist
