= Bharat Sevashram Sangha =

Hindu religious and spiritual organisation

Bharat Sevashram Sangha transl. Society for the Service of India
- Emblem of Bharat Sevashram Sangha
- Formation: 1917; 109 years ago
- Founder: Swami Pranavananda
- Type: Religious organisation
- Headquarters: Calcutta, India
- Region served: Worldwide
- Website: www.bharatsevashramsangha.org

Bharat Sevashram Sangha (transl. Society for the Service of India) is a Hindu religious and spiritual organisation focused on humanitarian work. It was founded in 1917 by Swami Pranavananda. The headquarter of the Sangha is situated in Calcutta with more than three hundreds of branches in India and also in other countries including the United Kingdom, United States, Guyana, Trinidad and Tobago, Canada, Fiji and Bangladesh. It has initiated several missions to African countries, Malaysia, and Indonesia; monks from the Sangha have accompanied United Nations delegations to Syria and Lebanon.

== Activities ==
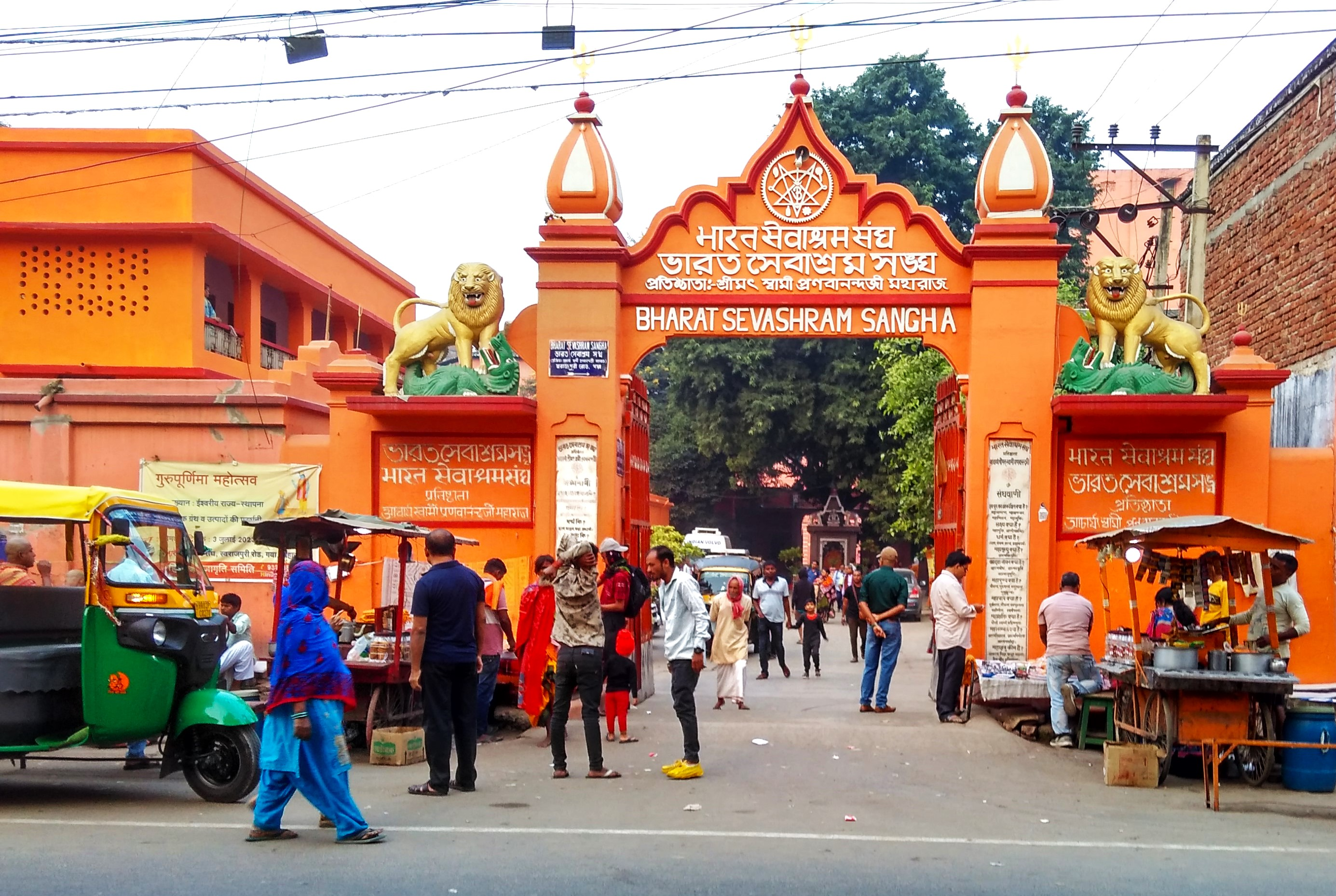
Main gate of Bharat Sevashram Sangha, Gaya, India

The Sangha is recognised for their community work, helping the poor, and providing healthcare to those in need.

The Sangha has responded to natural calamities in Andhra Pradesh and Odisha states, the Bengal famine of 1943, the Bhopal disaster, the 2001 Gujarat earthquake, and the 2004 Indian Ocean tsunami. At times of political unrest such as the Partition of India, the Sangha has set up refugee camps and war evacuee camps in the border areas.

It has organised several projects to help impoverished Indian tribal people. One such project involved providing schooling for children of the Sabar tribe and providing them with housing and healthcare. It also hosts courses to train youths in information technology to enable them to find jobs which require IT skills.

Following the 2004 Indian Ocean earthquake, the Sangha's monks proposed to set up a school for orphans at a cost of ₹42,50,000, an orphanage at ₹60,20,000, and 200 houses at ₹3 Crores on the Andaman and Nicobar Islands.

To spread message against violence and hatred in India and Bangladesh, the organisation has also produced biopics based on Swami Pranavananda.

The Sangha actively provides shelter, food, medical treatment and public safety services to pilgrims at various places of worship and religious fairs in India, such as the Kumbha Mela. It operates free hospitals at Barajuri and Calcutta, mobile dispensary and medical units in sixty-four locations, a free residence for patients and their families in Navi Mumbai, and four hospitals and homes for leprosy patients. A 500-bed hospital at Joka, Calcutta was inaugurated in 2010 by the Indian Finance Minister as an example of private-public partnerships in healthcare.

In May-2020, the Sangha was one of the few organisations who extended help to the people after the destruction caused by Cyclone Amphan. They also provided relief work including food at different parts of the country due to COVID-19 lockdown in India.

== Image Gallery ==
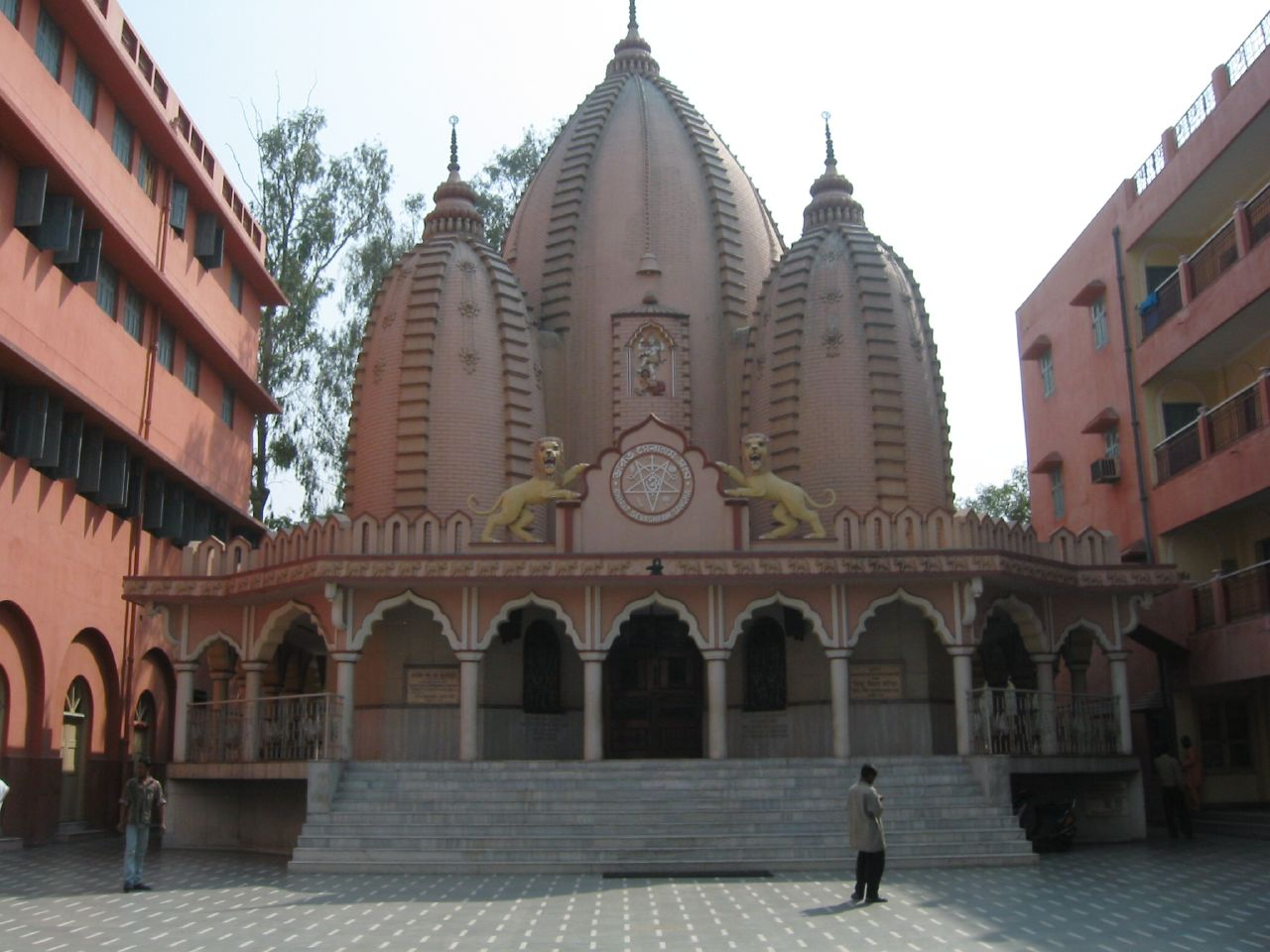
Bharat Sevashram Sangha centre in New Delhi

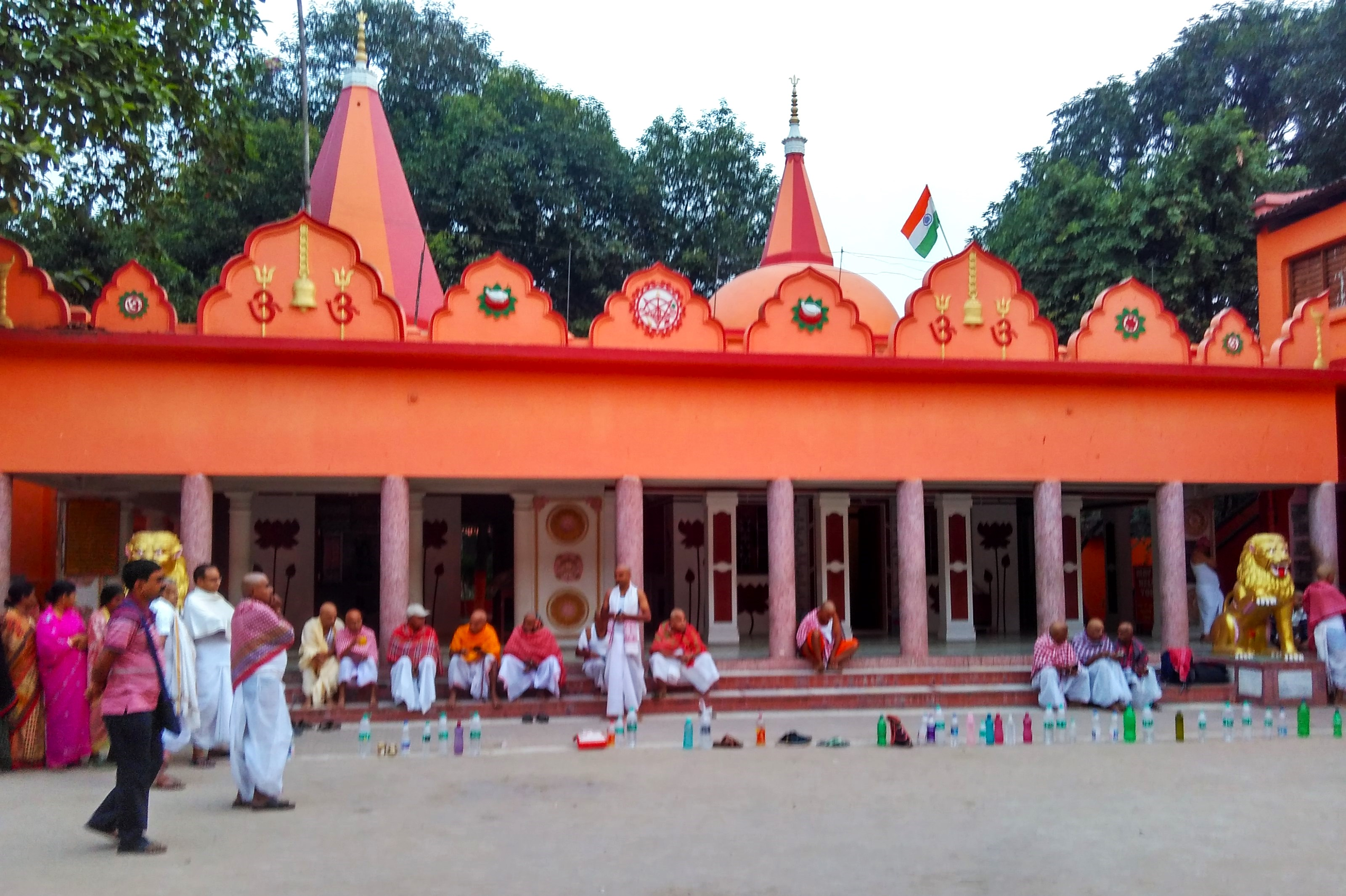
Bharat Sevashram Sangha Temple, Gaya, Bihar, India

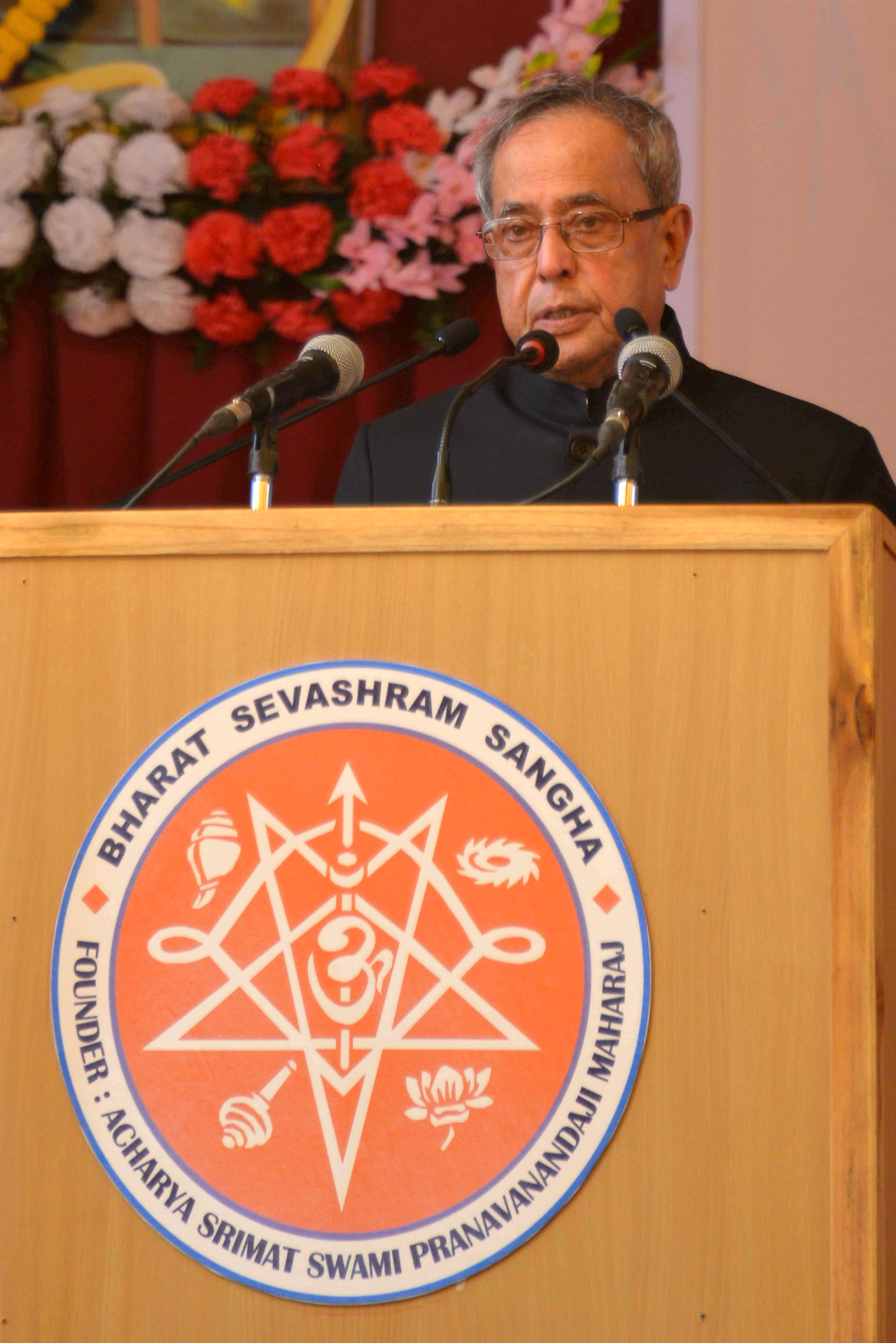
The President, Mr. Pranab Mukherjee addressing after the inauguration of the old-age home and school building of Bharat Sevashram Sangha, in Gurgaon, Haryana on 07-December-2014.

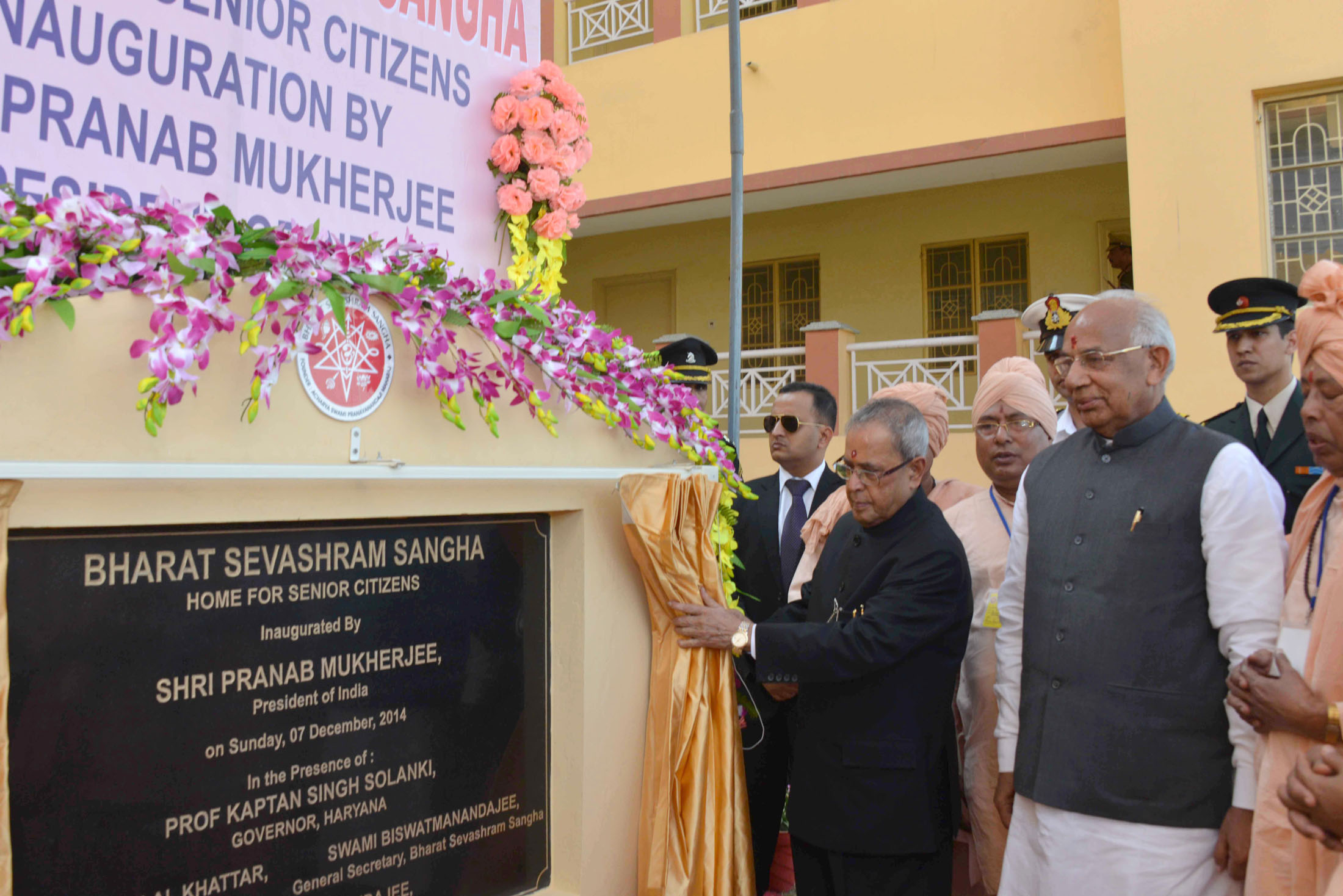
The President, Mr. Pranab Mukherjee unveiling the plaque to inaugurate the old-age home and school building of Bharat Sevashram Sangha, in Gurgaon, Haryana on 07-December-2014. The Governor of Haryana, Prof. Kaptan Singh Solanki is also seen.

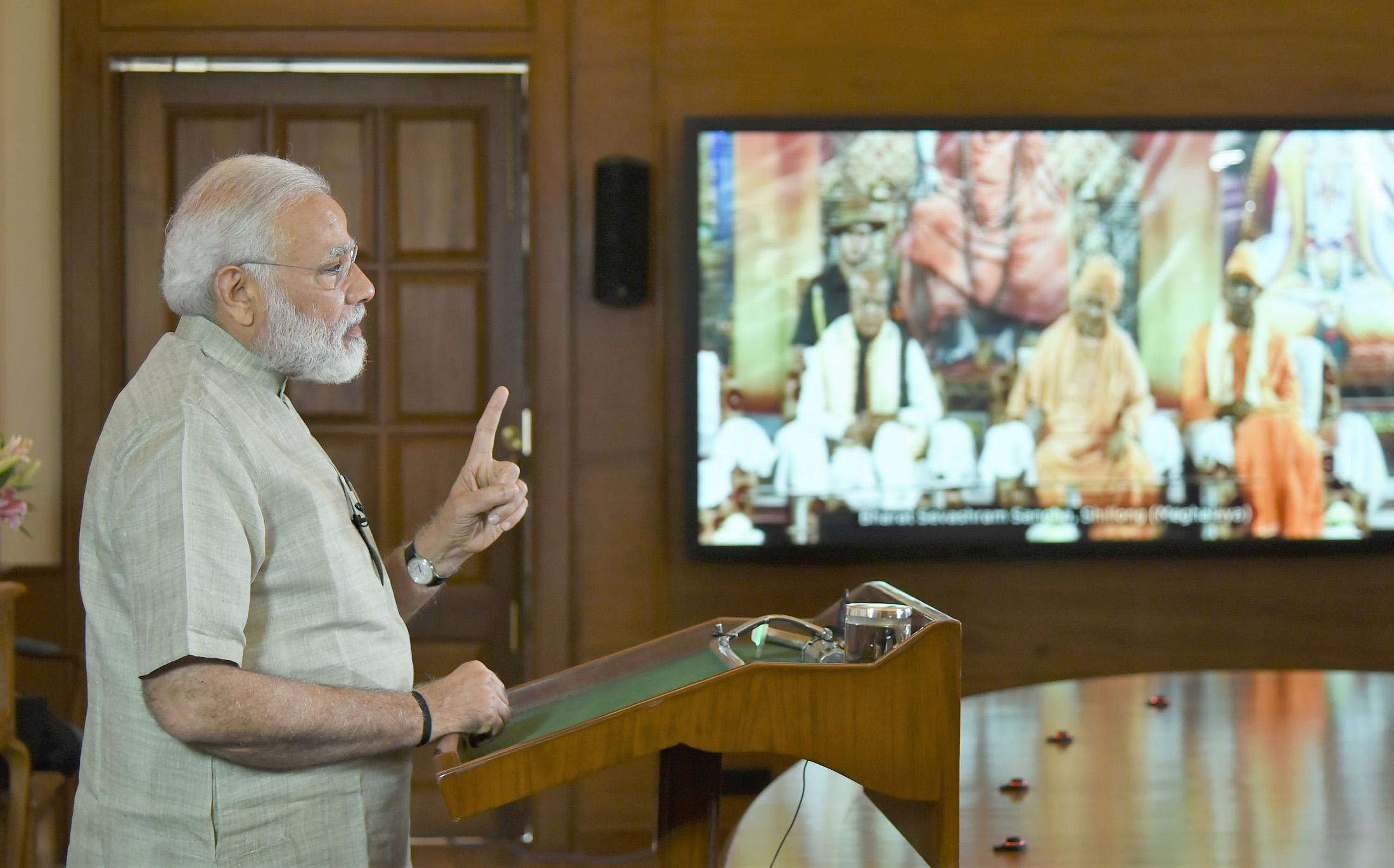
The Prime Minister, Mr. Narendra Modi addressing the Centenary Celebrations of Bharat Sevashram Sangha, via video conference, in New Delhi on 07-May-2017.

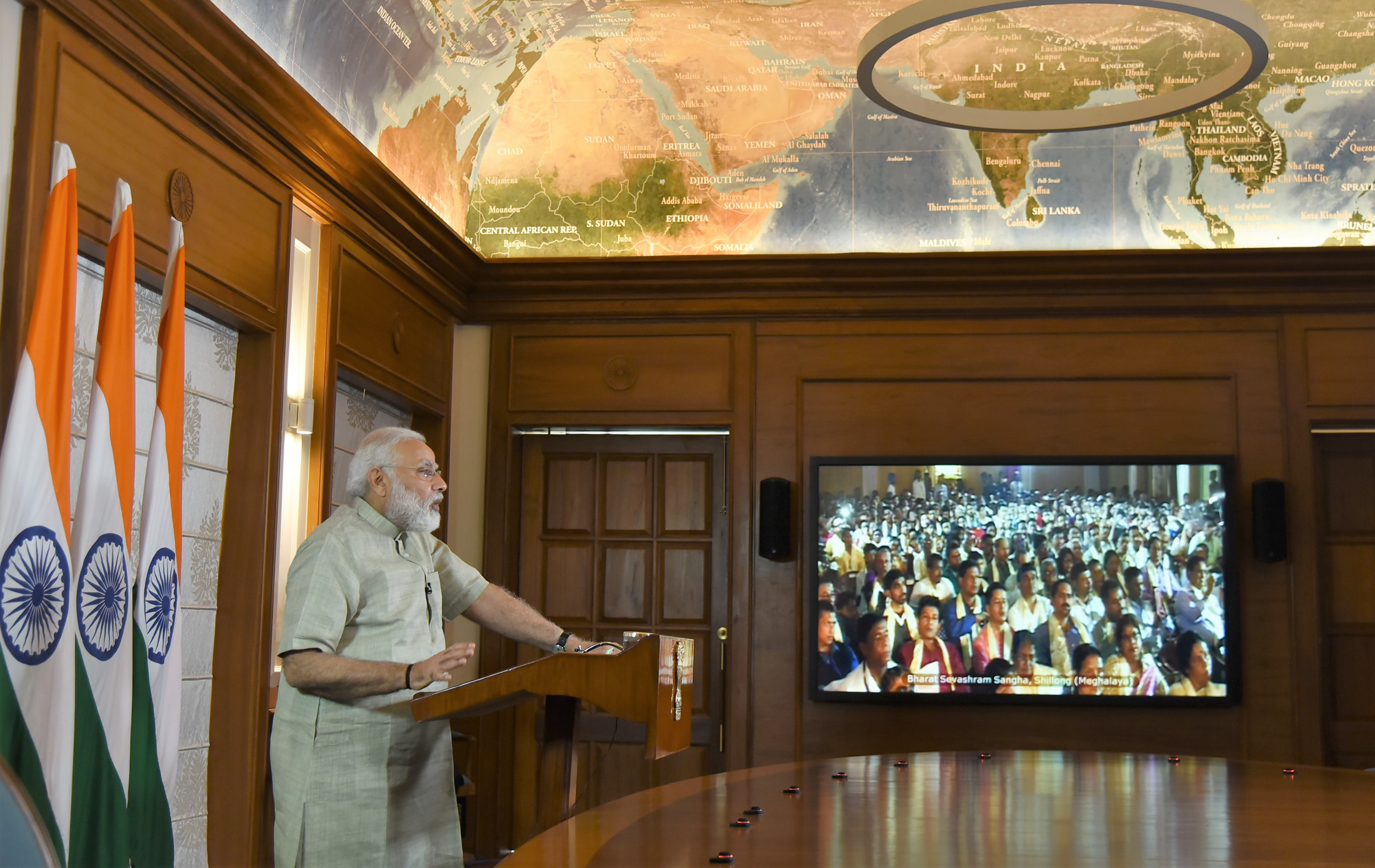
The Prime Minister, Mr. Narendra Modi addressing the Centenary Celebrations of Bharat Sevashram Sangha, via video conference, in New Delhi on 07-May-2017.

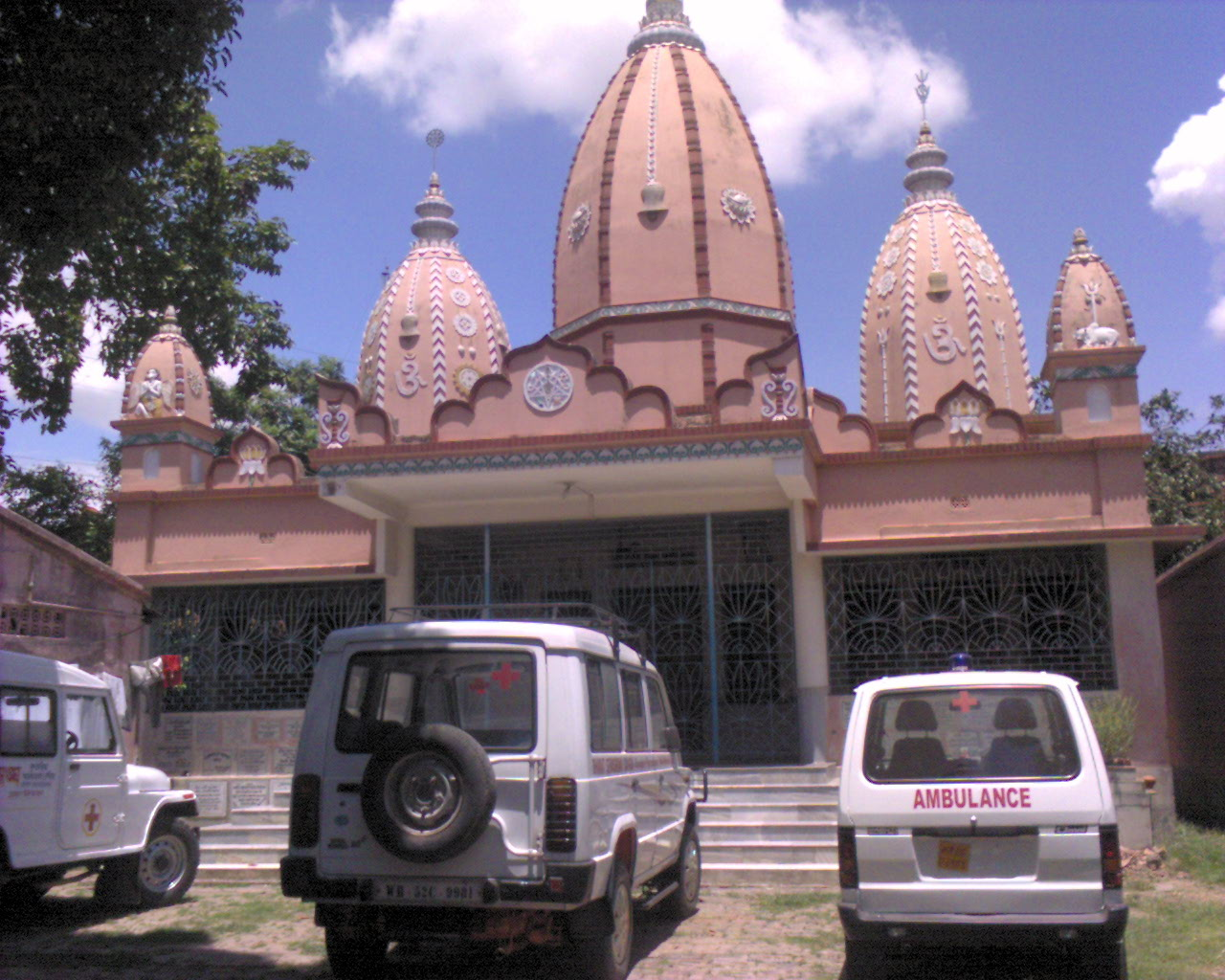
A temple at Bharat Sevashram Sangha centre in Ranaghat

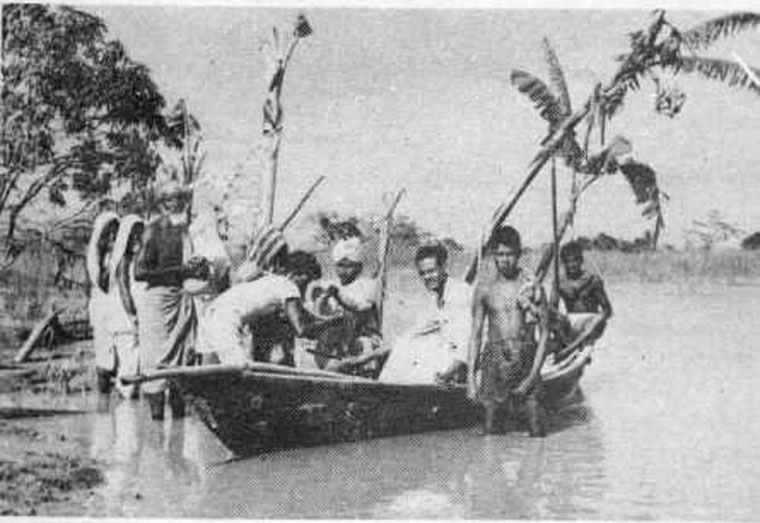
A photograph showing Swami Abhayananda of Bharat Sevashram Sangha distributing relief items from in Dalalbazar under Lakshmipur police station in Noakhali district. Dalalbazar falls under Lakshmipur district in present day Bangladesh.

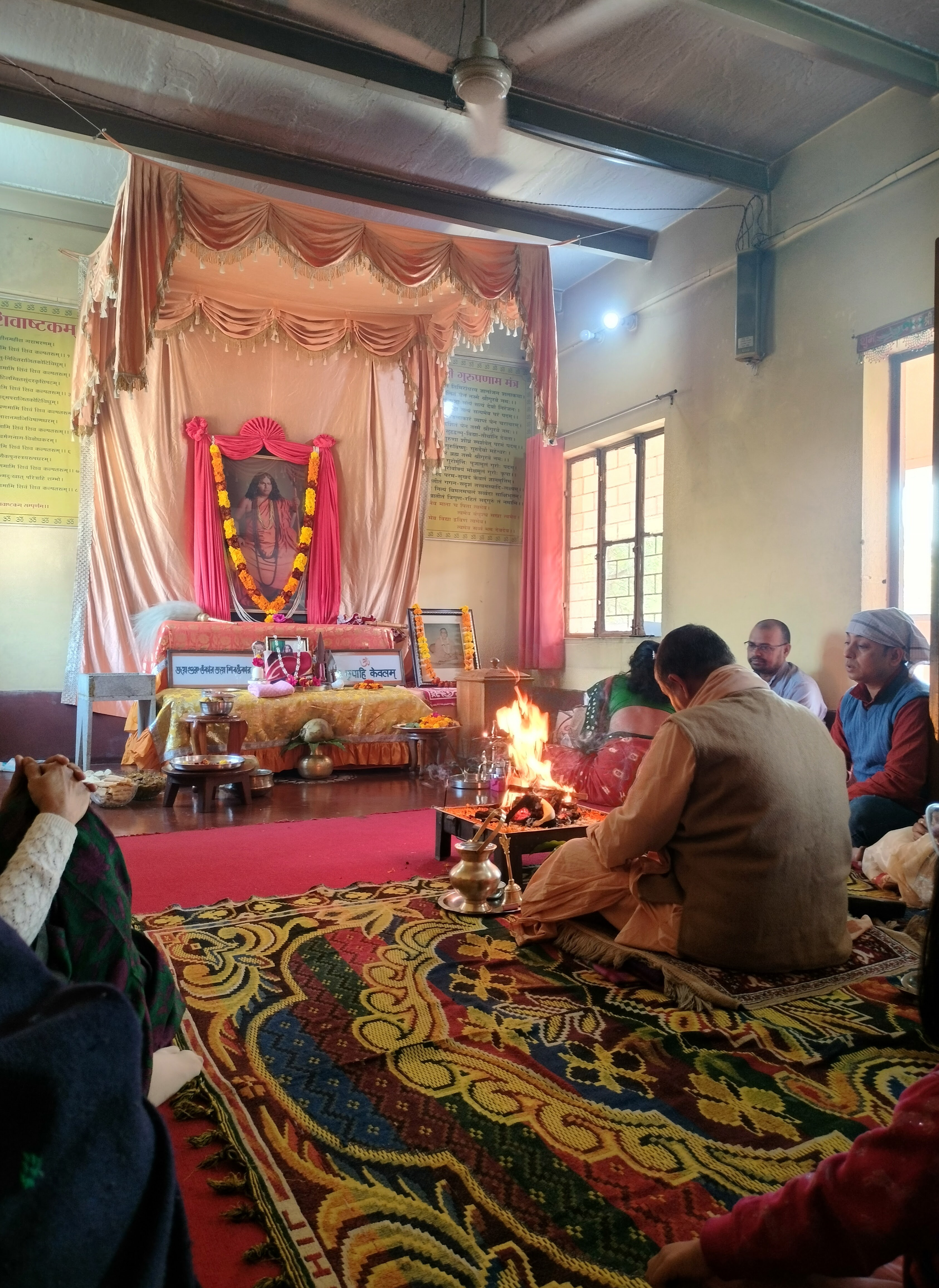
The chief priest performing a traditional public ritual in honour of the saint and founder Swami Pranavananda of Bharat Sevashram Sangha on the occasion of Guru Purnima at its ashram in Gurgaon, India.
