= Pranab =

Pranab is an Indian name, common among Assamese, Bengalis, Odias and Nepalis. A variation of the name is 'Pranav'. Notable people with the name include:

- Pranab R. Dastidar (1933-2022), Indian electronics engineer
- Pranab Kumar Barua (1934-2024), Bangladeshi academic
- Pranab Mukherjee (1935–2020), former Indian president
- Pranab Kumar Gogoi (1936-2020), Indian lawyer and politician
- Pranab K. Sen (1937-2023), American statistician
- Pranab Bardhan (born 1939), Indian economist
- Pranab Kumar Chowdhury (born 1960), Bangladeshi pediatrician and writer
- Pranab Kalita (born 1961), Indian politician
- Pranab Debbarma (born 1962), Indian politician
- Pranab Roy (born 1963), Indian cricketer
- Pranab Prakash Das (born 1972), Indian politician
- Pranab Kumar Balabantaray (born 1976, Indian politician
- Pranab Kumar Aich (born 1986), Indian filmmaker and photographer
