= Pranav Ashar =

Indian filmmaker

Pranav Ashar (born 10 January 1988) is an Indian VR filmmaker and founder of the media company, Enlighten. He won the British Council Young Creative Entrepreneur in 2011.
