= Swami Pranavananda =

Indian Hindu Monk

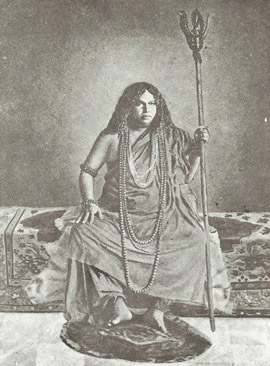
- Swami Pranavananda

Personal life
- Born: Binode Bhuiya; 29 January 1896 Bajitpur, Faridpur District, Bengal Presidency, British India; (present-day in Bajitpur, Faridpur District, Bangladesh)
- Died: 8 January 1941 (aged 44) Calcutta, Bengal Presidency, British India; (present-day in Kolkata, West Bengal, India)

Religious life
- Religion: Hinduism
- Founder of: Bharat Sevashram Sangha

Swami Pranavananda (Bengali: স্বামী প্রণবানন্দ; Sanskrit: स्वामी प्रणवानन्द; IAST: Svāmī Praṇavānanda) also known as Yogācāryya Śrīmat Svāmī Praṇavānanda Jī Mahārāja (Bengali: যুগাচার্য্য শ্রীমৎ স্বামী প্রণবানন্দ জী মহারাজ; Hindi: योगाचार्य श्रीमत् स्वामी प्रणवानन्द जी महाराज), (24 February 1896 – 8 January 1941) was a Hindu yogi and saint who founded a not-for-profit spiritual organization known as the Bharat Sevashram Sangha.

He is remembered for his efforts to bring the modern Hindu society into the new age without compromising the essential values of ancient traditions of Hindu spirituality. Swamiji was one of the greatest spiritual leaders of modern India. He is still revered his message of universal love, compassion for humanity and social reform without giving up the zeal and love of mother land.

== Early life ==
He was born on 29 January 1896, the day of Maghi Purnima (16th Magha, 1302), in a Bengali Kayastha family of Bajitpur, a village in Faridpur District in undivided India (presently in Bangladesh). His parents Vishnu Charan Bhuiya and Saradadevi were pious and were said to be blessed by Lord Shiva to have a son for the mitigation of human suffering and universal emancipation. He was named Jaynath by his father at birth and later in his boyhood he was called Binod. Binod apparently showed uncommon philosophical inclinations and had divine visions since childhood and often could be seen in contemplation at the village school. He was known with the children of the locality because of his helpful nature.

Pranavananda's greatest legacy is the founding of Bharat Sevashram Sangha, whose organisational network resembled the structure of the more famous Rashtriya Swayamsevak Sangh, founded almost a decade after the Bharat Sevashram Sangha.
