= Enlighten Media Group =

Indian private organization

Enlighten Company
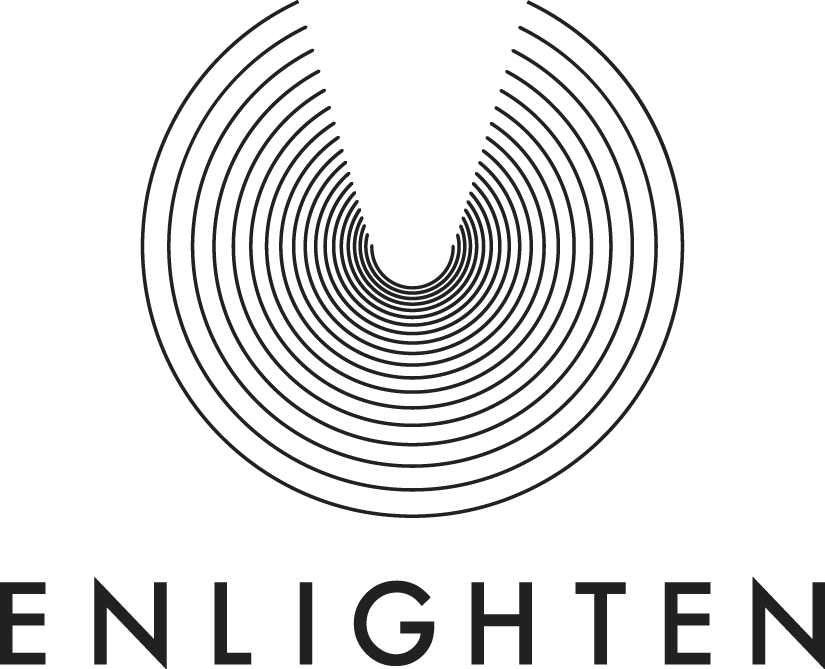
- Industry: Technology and design
- Genre: World Cinema
- Founded: 2008
- Founder: Pranav Ashar
- Headquarters: Mumbai, India
- Key people: Pranav Ashar
- Products: DVDs, posters
- Services: Film society

Enlighten Company is an Indian private organization founded in 2008 working towards the promotion of World Cinema in the subcontinent. Founded by Pranav Ashar in 2006, the group operates through two related but legally distinct operations: a Film Society structured as a non-profit organization and a DVD label structured as a private limited company.

== History ==
In 2006, Pranav Ashar, then an 18-year-old student at University of Mumbai, decided to start a film society that would show film classics on the big screen. He was particularly passionate about world cinema and was actively involved with the Mithibai College Film Society. He saw starting a broader film society as a way to share his passion with more like-minded individuals. Thus, Enlighten Film Society started with two screens at Cinemax, which the owners graciously allowed them to use for a nominal fee early on a Sunday morning.

In 2008, Enlighten sensed that the market was ripe for a DVD label focused on introducing world cinema to India. They tested the market with nine titles in 2008, leveraging their contacts from the film society and building their own distribution capability to get it done right (instead of tying up with an existing player in the market). After improving upon this effort and ultimately meeting with success, they increased the number of titles in 2009 and even further in 2010.

== Description ==
In 2013, Enlighten Film Society had 10,000 members across the country and has recently been certified as India's largest film society by Federation of Film Societies of India.

They charge the members a fixed annual amount to be a member of our film society. In return, members get a card that entitles them to gain entrance to any of their weekly film screenings, at which they showcase a carefully chosen eclectic blend of the finest in world cinema. The screenings are announced in advance via newspaper ads, SMS, email, and the Enlighten website. Members can come as often as they wish, up to the maximum possible of 50 screenings per year.

Additionally, they also organize exclusive events and talks with Indian cinema celebrities like Anurag Kashyap, Amitabh Bachchan, and Shabana Azmi. The company has been organizing the Naya Cinema film festival since 2010.

Prominent film personalities who have spoken at Enlighten screenings include Anurag Kashyap, Saif Ali Khan, Imtiaz Ali, Javed Akhtar, Sudhir Mishra, Ketan Mehta, Waheeda Rehman, Sriram Raghavan, Amitabh Bachchan, Siddiq Barmak, Sujoy Ghosh, Mrinal Sen, Tapan Sinha, Shabana Azmi, Vivek Agnihotri, and Farhan Akhtar. They have also hosted various award-winning filmmakers from countries like Italy, France, Germany, Russia, Iran, China, Indonesia, the US, Turkey, and Argentina.

Another first by Enlighten Film Society was the establishment of the World Cinema Day, celebrated on 13 April every year. Today, Taj Enlighten Film Society operates in 5 theatre screens across 4 Indian cities: Mumbai (2 screens), Delhi (1 screen), Bangalore (1 screen), and Surat (1 screen). They will soon be expanding to other major cities like Kolkata, Pune, Hyderabad, and Chennai. They also manage programming for numerous smaller film societies across India, many of whom are more niche in nature or at smaller venues. Currently they manage programming for 37 such film societies across India and by the end of the calendar year they plan to help and collaborate with 150 film societies, possibly re-branding some of these under the "Enlighten" name.

=== Enlighten Award ===
Enlighten Film Society confers the prestigious Enlighten Award to leading talents of Indian Cinema. Amitabh Bachchan, Javed Akhtar, Mrinal Sen and Shabana Azmi are some of the recipients of this honour.

== Enlighten Films DVD label ==
In 2008, Enlighten launched a DVD label focused on world cinema. Enlighten tested the market in a low risk way with nine classic titles from the 1930s and 1940s. They currently have a library of about 150 titles, including not just films but also certain TV serials (e.g. Shah Rukh Khan's Fauji) under the label 'The Golden Age of Television'.

Enlighten have built their own distribution capability rather than tying up with an existing player in the market. They have expanded distribution across all of India, selling directly to retail chains and relying on regional distributors to reach non-chain retailers.

== Enlighten Film posters ==
In the bid to expand into other complementary film-related areas, Enlighten intends to venture into the distribution of film posters. Enlighten has assembled the largest library of posters in India, and we will start selling copies of these posters via retailers in 2011.
