= West Indian cricket team in Australia in 1960–61 =

International cricket tour

West Indies cricket team in Australia in 1960-61
- Date: 9 December 1960 – 15 February 1961
- Location: Australia
- Result: Australia won the 5-Test series 2-1
Teams
- Australia: West Indies
Captains
- (Australia) Richie Benaud: (Cricket West Indies) Frank Worrell
Most runs
- Norm O'Neill (522): Rohan Kanhai (503)
Most wickets
- Alan Davidson (33): Wes Hall (21)

The West Indies cricket team toured Australia in the 1960–61 season under the captaincy of Frank Worrell. Both Worrell and his opposing captain, Richie Benaud, encouraged their teams to play attacking cricket. The first Test of the five match series ended in a dramatic tie, the first of only two instances in Test cricket. Though West Indies narrowly lost the series 2–1, with one draw in addition to the tie, they might easily have won both the last two matches and taken the series 3–1. They took much credit for contributing to such an exciting series and made themselves extremely popular with the Australian public. Prior to their departure from Australia, the team were paraded through Melbourne in open-top cars on 17 February 1961, and were cheered by enormous crowds.

Worrell's success as captain was particularly significant, because all previous West Indies captains had been white (except for George Headley in a single home Test in 1947–48).

The series marked the first time that the Australian Broadcasting Corporation had covered all five Test matches of a touring team. In 2000, the Corporation produced a two-part documentary of the tour entitled Calypso Summer which included a mixture of five hours of archived match highlights, anecdotes and current day reflections from the key players. The documentary was released in 2005 as a three-disc DVD.

== West Indian touring party ==
The touring party consisted of: FMM Worrell (captain), FCM Alexander (vice-captain), DT Dewdney, LR Gibbs, WW Hall, JL Hendriks, CC Hunte, RB Kanhai, PD Lashley, SM Nurse, S Ramadhin, CW Smith, GS Sobers, JS Solomon, AL Valentine, CD Watson. GE Gomez, the manager, played in three of the minor "up country" matches. WMM Marshall, his assistant, played in the match against Tasmania, his only first-class appearance.

== West Indian successes ==
Commerce in [Melbourne] stood almost still as the smiling cricketers from the West Indies, the vanquished not the victors, were given a send-off the like of which is normally reserved for Royalty and national heroes.

— Wisden Cricketers' Almanack,

Kanhai, Sobers, Hunte, Alexander, Hall and Gibbs all had fine series. Kanhai showed his quality early on, when he played a fine innings of 252 in the fourth first-class match of the tour, against Victoria. In the fourth Test he achieved the rare feat of scoring a hundred in each innings.

Sobers had been out of form early in the tour, but his century on the first day of the first Test was rated by some watchers as the best hundred they had ever seen. He scored another century in the third Test.

Hunte made a century in the second Test.

Alexander, the wicketkeeper, had lost the captaincy to Worrell, but he made a major contribution with the bat. In all five Tests he made at least one fifty, and he recorded his first Test century in the third Test.

Gibbs, the off-spinner, made his Test debut, replacing Ramadhin for the last three Tests. He headed the West Indies Test bowling averages for the series, with 19 wickets at an average of 20.78. In his second match, the fourth Test, he took the first Test hat-trick against Australia since J.T. Hearne did so for England at Leeds in 1899.

The speed and fire of Hall captured the imagination, and he took nine wickets in the first Test.

== Australian successes ==
O'Neill scored the only century for Australia, an innings full of character, in the first Test.

Simpson made two centuries as well as six scores of 70 or over in eight appearances against the touring team, though neither century was in a Test. He made a major contribution to Australia's final victory by hitting 75 and 92.

Grout had a fine series behind the stumps, assisting in 23 dismissals.

Davidson took 33 wickets with his accurate left-arm quick bowling, more than any other bowler on either side, even though he missed the fourth Test because of injury. His batting was also important in the first Test, when he did the "match double" of 100 or more runs and 10 or more wickets.

Benaud captured 23 wickets and played a vital innings in the first Test, but his captaincy made an even bigger impact.

== Results ==
All Matches: Played 22, Won 10, Lost 5, Drawn 5, Tied 2

First-Class Matches: Played 14, Won 4, Lost 5, Drawn 4, Tied 1

Test Matches: Played 5, Won 1, Lost 2, Drawn 1, Tied 1

== Test series Summary ==
=== First Test ===
9–14 December 1960
scorecard

West Indies	v	Australia
453 (100.6 overs); Garfield Sobers 132; Alan Davidson 5/135 (30 overs)		505 (130.3 overs); Norm O'Neill 181; Wes Hall 4/140 (29.3 overs)
284 (92.6 overs); Frank Worrell 65; Alan Davidson 6/87 (24.6 overs)		232 (68.7 overs); Alan Davidson 80; Wes Hall 5/63 (17.7 overs)

Match tied
The Gabba, Brisbane
Umpires: Colin Egar and Col Hoy

- West Indies won the toss and elected to bat
- Cammie Smith and Peter Lashley (WI) made their Test debuts
- 11 December was taken as a rest day
- This was the first tie in Test cricket

At the end of the first day, West Indies had reached 359–7. After slumping to 65–3, all three wickets being taken by Davidson, Worrell assisted Sobers in taking the score to 239, at which point Sobers was out, his 132 having taken only 174 minutes. Worrell followed shortly afterwards for 65, but Solomon (65) ensured that there would be no collapse.

Next morning, Alexander took his overnight score of 21 to 60 and Hall, batting at number 10, unexpectedly contributed exactly 50, the two adding 86 for the ninth wicket. When their innings ended, the West Indies' scoring rate was 56 runs per 100 balls, very high by the standards of the time.

McDonald (57) and Simpson (92) gave Australia a good start to their innings. Simpson was out just before the close, when Australia were 196–3.

On the third day, Australia took a first innings lead of 52, thanks mainly to O'Neill's 181. He was the last man out. At one point Australia had been 469–5, and a large lead had looked likely, but Davidson's dismissal for 44 triggered a collapse, with Hall taking four of the last five wickets. West Indies were 0–0 in their second innings at close of play.

Next day, West Indies reached 259–9, having been 210–4 at one point. Four batsmen made 39 or more, but none could go on to a big score.

Next morning, the last wicket pair added 25 more runs which were to prove vital, as well as reducing the time that Australia had at their disposal. They were set 233 to win in what turned out to be 69 eight ball overs. The required run rate was 42 per 100 balls, which should not have been unduly challenging. However Australia made a bad start, and when they were 92–6, Hall having taken four of the wickets, seemed doomed to defeat. However Davidson (80) and Benaud (52) then took the score to 226, with only seven more runs needed.

Now that all seemed lost, the West Indian fielding, which until now had been fallible in both innings, reached the heights. Three of the last four batsmen were run out in what had by now become a race against time. First Benaud called for a sharp single, but Solomon hit the stumps from mid-wicket to dismiss Davidson, who had had a magnificent match (124 runs and 11 wickets).

The new batsman, Grout, then took a single. When the last over, to be bowled by Hall, began, six runs were still required with three wickets left:

- Ball 1: 1 leg-bye, Grout was hit on the thigh and the batsmen took a leg-bye.
- Ball 2: OUT, Benaud was caught by the keeper.
- Ball 3: No run, Meckiff played the ball back to the bowler.
- Ball 4: 1 bye, The batsmen scrambled a bye as the ball went through to the keeper, Hall failing to run out Meckiff when the keeper threw the ball to him.
- Ball 5: 1 run, Grout hit the ball high into the air. Hall dropped the catch, and another run resulted.
- Ball 6: 2 runs and OUT, Meckiff hit to leg. Hunte cut off the boundary, as the batsmen turned for a third run which would have given Australia victory. But Hunte's return was accurate, low and fast, and Grout was run out by a foot. The last man, Kline, came in with two balls remaining and the scores level.
- Ball 7: OUT, Kline played the ball towards square leg. Meckiff sprinted down the wicket, but Solomon for a second time threw down the wicket, this time from side on.

=== Second Test ===
30 December 1960 – 3 January 1961
scorecard

Australia	v	West Indies
348 (66.1 overs); Ken Mackay 74 (136); Wes Hall 4/51 (12 overs)		181 (69.2 overs); Rohan Kanhai 84 (165); Alan Davidson 6/53 (22 overs)
70/3 (18.4 overs); Bob Simpson 27* (62); Wes Hall 2/32 (9.4 overs)		233 (80.4 overs) (f/o); Conrad Hunte 110 (249); Johnny Martin 3/56 (20 overs)

Australia won by 7 wickets
Melbourne Cricket Ground, Melbourne, Australia
Umpires: Colin Egar and Col Hoy

- Australia won the toss and elected to bat
- Johnny Martin and Frank Misson (Aus) made their Test debuts.
- 1 January 1961 was taken as a rest day

Australia's first innings came at the very high rate for the period of 66 runs per hundred balls. No-one went on to make a big score, however, and when they were 251-8 it seemed that they might be dismissed for a fairly modest total. However the number 10, Martin, helped Mackay to add 97 for the ninth wicket before both were dismissed in quick succession. Martin's 55, in his first Test, took only 67 balls. There was enough time before the close for Davidson to dismiss Solomon for a duck, West Indies closing on 1/1.

The second day ended early because of rain. After the early loss of Hunte, Nurse and Kanhai took the score to 108–2, with Kanhai by far the more aggressive, having scored 70 runs to his partner's 35.

Kanhai was out on the third day when the score had reached 124, having made 84. The remaining wickets added only another 57, though Nurse - the sheet anchor - battled away until he was ninth out for 70. His innings included only a single boundary, in sharp contrast to Kanhai's 13, and lasted for 305 minutes. Davidson finished with the fine figures of 6/53. Some rain had seeped through the covers overnight, but the pitch was not difficult enough to justify the West Indian collapse.

West Indies had to follow on 167 runs behind. Not long before the end of the day's play they had reached 97–2, but then Martin dismissed Kanhai, Sobers and Worrell - the latter two for ducks - to leave West Indies reeling at 99–5. Hunte, who had batted throughout, and Alexander took the score to 129 by the close, when the former had reached 74 not out.

On the fourth day, Hunt and Alexander took the score to 186 before Hunte was out for 110 to the occasional leg-spin of O'Neill. After that, the end of the innings was not long delayed, Alexander being last out for 72. Only Hunte, Kanhai and Alexander had reached double figures.

Though Australia slumped to 30–3, with Harvey and O'Neill both making ducks, there were no further alarms and they won with a day to spare.

=== Third Test ===
13–18 January 1961
scorecard

West Indies	v	Australia
339 (81.6 overs); Garfield Sobers 168 (234); Alan Davidson 5/80 (21.6 overs)		202 (74.2 overs); Norm O'Neill 71 (148); Alf Valentine 4/67 (24.2 overs)
326 (102.4 overs); Gerry Alexander 108 (190); Richie Benaud 4/113 (44 overs)		241 (72.2 overs); Neil Harvey 85 (185); Lance Gibbs 5/66 (26 overs)

West Indies won by 222 runs
Sydney Cricket Ground, Sydney
Umpires: Colin Egar and Col Hoy

- West Indies won the toss and elected to bat
- 15 January was taken as a rest day

West Indies scored 303–5 on the first day, mainly due to a fine innings by Sobers. When the second new ball was taken after tea, he added 72 at a run a minute, going from 80 to 152.

Sobers was out early on the next day for 168, and West Indies collapsed to 339 all out. Yet again, Davidson had the best bowling figures, 5/80, and Benaud finished with 4/86. Australia had reached 172–5 by the close, mainly thanks to O'Neill, who was the fifth man out at 155.

On the third morning, Australia emulated West Indies in collapsing, Gibbs at one point taking three wickets in four balls. West Indies batted again with a lead of 137, but were soon 22–3, all three wickets falling to Davidson. Smith and Worrell repaired the damage with a stand of 101, before Smith was out for 55. More wickets then fell quickly, and West Indies ended the day on 179–7, Worrell being the last man to fall, for 82.

On the fourth day Alexander, who had been 11 not out overnight, increased his score to 108, with good support from the tail, taking the game away from Australia. Needing an improbable 464 to win, a good partnership between Harvey and O'Neill took them to 182–2 by the close, with Harvey 84 not out and O'Neill 53 not out.

On the final day, Harvey was soon out for 85, and Australia collapsed to the spinners, Gibbs and Valentine. O'Neill made 70. At one point Gibbs took four wickets for two runs in a spell of 27 balls. His final figures were 5/66 and Valentine had 4/86. Each took eight wickets in the match.

So after three matches, each side had one win, in addition to the tie.

=== Fourth Test ===
27 January–1 February 1961
scorecard

West Indies	v	Australia
393 (88.5 overs); Rohan Kanhai 117; Richie Benaud 5/96 (27 overs)		366 (109.6 overs); Bob Simpson 85; Lance Gibbs 5/97 (35.6 overs)
432/6d (92 overs); Rohan Kanhai 115; Ken Mackay 2/72 (12 overs)		273/9 (120 overs); Norm O'Neill 65; Frank Worrell 3/27 (17 overs)

Match drawn
Adelaide Oval, Adelaide
Umpires: Colin Egar and Col Hoy

- West Indies won the toss and elected to bat
- 29 January was taken as a rest day
- Des Hoare played his only Test for Australia

On the first day West Indies made 348–7, built around a fourth wicket stand of 107 between Kanhai and Worrell. Kanhai made 117 in just 139 minutes, and Worrell scored 71. Benaud took four of the wickets.

Next morning, West Indies took their score to 393, thanks largely to Alexander's 63 not out. They scored at 55 runs per hundred balls. Australia had reached 221–4 by close of play, with Simpson on 85 not out.

Simpson was out without addition next morning. After Benaud and Mackay had added 60, Gibbs took a hat-trick with the score on 281, dismissing Mackay for 29 and Grout and Misson for ducks. Australia were now 281–8, and it seemed that West Indies would have a first innings lead of close to one hundred. However Hoare, in what was to be his only Test, helped Benaud to add 85 before he was out for 35, (Hoare had replaced the injured Davidson, whose bowling was badly missed.) Benaud quickly followed for 77, but the deficit had been reduced to 27. By the end of the day's play, West Indies had reached 150–1 in their second innings, with Hunte on 44 not out and Kanhai on 59 not out.

On the fourth day, Hunte was run out for 79, after what at the time was a record second wicket stand for West Indies against Australia of 163, but Kanhai went on to his second hundred of the match, 115. Worrell made 53 and Alexander was 87 not out at the declaration on 432–6, made at a rate of 59 runs per 100 balls. This left Australia a mammoth 461 to win, which subsequent events suggested might have been over-cautious. Australia made a terrible start, ending the day on 32–3, with defeat looking likely. First McDonald was run out, and then Hall had both Favell and Simpson caught by Alexander behind the stumps.

On the final day, O'Neill and Burge took the score to 113 before Burge was out for 49. O'Neill (65) and Benaud quickly followed, before Mackay and Grout steadied the ship. Mackay had been dropped first ball, which proved to be crucial. Grout was dismissed by Worrell for 42 after the pair had added 59, and he followed up by quickly taking the wickets of Misson and Hoare.

When Kline joined Mackay, Australia were 207-9 and appeared doomed, for there was still one hour and fifty minutes playing time remaining. Only two minutes later, Sobers, fielding only four yards from the bat, appealed confidently for a catch from Mackay off Worrell, but Egar ruled that it was not out. In one of the great rearguard actions, the pair proceeded to play out the remaining time. Mackay was a capable batsman but Kline was a bowler and less used to being asked to make a long stand at the crease. In his thirteen Tests Kline never exceeded the 15 not out that he made on this occasion. Mackay's 62 not out occupied 223 balls, and Kline's score was made from 109. Their unbroken last wicket stand added 66, though the runs were almost an irrelevance.

=== Fifth Test ===
10–15 February 1961
scorecard

West Indies	v	Australia
292 (89.7 overs); Garfield Sobers 64 (179); Frank Misson 4/58 (14 overs)		356 (121.4 overs); Colin McDonald 91 (175); Garfield Sobers 5/120 (44 overs)
321 (95.7 overs); Gerry Alexander 73 (126); Alan Davidson 5/84 (24.7 overs)		258/8 (111.7 overs); Bob Simpson 92 (231); Frank Worrell 3/43 (31 overs)

Australia won by 2 wickets
Melbourne Cricket Ground, Melbourne
Umpires: Colin Egar and Col Hoy

- Australia won the toss and elected to field
- 12 February was taken as a rest day

West Indies were 252–8 at the end of the first day, after Australia won the toss and asked them to bat. Though all of the dismissed batsmen reached double figures, none could go on to make a substantial score. The best partnership was between Sobers and Lashley, who took the score from 107–4 to 200–5, after which three more wickets fell fairly quickly. When Benaud put West Indies in, he may have hoped that the heavy atmosphere would help Davidson, but for once he was not that effective and the spinners did much of the damage.

The second day was a Saturday, and a then world record crowd of 90,800 (it remains the third largest crowd on a single day of Test cricket) watched the play. Forty more runs were added by West Indies, with Solomon and Hall completing a useful ninth wicket partnership of 55. Australia reached 236–3 by the end of the day's play, with Burge 37 not out and Mackay 16 not out, and it looked as though they might establish a substantial lead. Simpson (75) and McDonald (91) put on 146 for the first wicket.

On the Monday, Australia reached 309 before the sixth wicket fell, Burge being out for 68. But the last four wickets added only 47 runs. Sobers finished with 5/120 and Gibbs with 4/74. So West Indies' deficit on first innings was only 64, and by close of play - at 126-2 - they were reasonably placed, with Hunte 46 not out.

Hunte was soon dismissed on the next morning, for 52, and West Indies subsided to 218–6, only 154 ahead. All of the top five had passed twenty, but none could go on to a big score. However Alexander (73) received useful support from the tail, and when West Indies were all out for 321 Australia needed 258 to win. Yet again, Davidson was the outstanding Australian bowler. McDonald was out just before the close, when Australia were 57–1, with Simpson on 44.

Benaud, who had gone in as nightwatchman, did not last long the next morning, but Simpson and O'Neill took the score to 154 before the former was third out for 91. So with seven wickets left, Australia only needed another 104. But wickets now fell steadily, including O'Neill for 48, Harvey and Davidson, all three dismissed by Worrell. When Burge was seventh out to Valentine for 53, Australia still needed another 8 runs to win. With four runs required, there was a moment of controversy. Grout late cut Valentine for two runs, but the off bail had fallen to the ground. The umpires consulted, but ruled that the batsman was not out. Thus Australia were 256-7 instead of 254–8. Valentine had Grout's wicket without further addition to the score: 256–8. Still without addition, an easy chance given by Martin was missed, the batsmen taking a single to bring the scores level. Australia then edged home by two wickets, the winning run being a bye. Australia had scored at only 29 runs per 100 balls. At the death, Mackay scored his 3 not out off 51 balls. Worrell bowled 31 8-ball overs in conceding only 43 runs for his 3 wickets, and Gibbs bowled 41 overs in taking 2/68. Valentine took 3/60 in 21.7 overs.
