= Australian cricket team in England in 1961 =

International cricket tour

The 1961 Australian cricket tour of England began with a three-day match versus Worcestershire at the County Ground, New Road, Worcester on Saturday 29 April, play continuing on Monday 1 May and Tuesday 2 May. This match was rain-affected and ended in a draw. The tour ended at Trinity College Park, Dublin on 19 September when the Australians completed a 282 run victory in a two-day match versus Ireland.

In the first innings of the tour match against Cambridge University in mid-May, the Australians scored 449-3d – still the lowest first-class innings to feature four individual centuries.

The Australian tour party consisted of these players: R Benaud (captain), R N Harvey (vice-captain), A T W Grout (wicket-keeper), B N Jarman (wicket-keeper), W M Lawry, N C O'Neill, P J P Burge, C C McDonald, B C Booth, R B Simpson, K D Mackay, A K Davidson, F M Misson, G D McKenzie, R A Gaunt, I W Quick, L F Kline.

== Series overview ==
The main business of the tour was a five-Test series versus England. The matches were played at Edgbaston, Lord's, Headingley, Old Trafford and The Oval. Australia won the series 2–1 to retain The Ashes.

=== First Test ===
8–13 June 1961
(5-day match)
Scorecard

England	v	Australia
195 (84.3 overs); R. Subba Row 59; K.D. Mackay 4/57 (29 overs); R. Benaud 3/15 (14.3 overs)		516/9d (152.5 overs); R.N. Harvey 114; N.C.L. O'Neill 82; R.B. Simpson 76; Statham, J.B. 3/147 (43 overs)
401/4 (154 overs); E.R. Dexter 180; R. Subba Row 112; F.M. Misson 2/82 (28 overs)

Match drawn
Edgbaston, Birmingham
Umpires: Buller, J.S. and Lee, F.S.

- England won the toss and elected to bat.
- 11 June was taken as a rest day.
- W.M. Lawry (AUS) and Murray, J.T. (ENG) made their Test debuts.

=== Second Test ===
22–26 June 1961
(5-day match)
Scorecard

England	v	Australia
206 (78.3 overs); R. Subba Row 48; A.K. Davidson 5/42 (24.3 overs)		340 (139.3 overs); W.M. Lawry 130; K.D. Mackay 54; Trueman, F.S. 4/118 (34 overs); E.R. Dexter 3/56 (24 overs)
202 (97 overs); Barrington, K.F. 66; Pullar, G. 42; G.D. McKenzie 5/37 (29 overs)		71/5 (20.5 overs); P.J.P. Burge 37*; Statham, J.B. 3/31 (10.5 overs); Trueman, F.S. 2/40 (10 overs)

Australia won by 5 wickets
Lord's, London
Umpires: Elliott, C.S. and Phillipson, W.E.

- England won the toss and elected to bat.
- 25 June was taken as a rest day.
- The match was scheduled for five days but completed in four.
- G.D. McKenzie (AUS) made his Test debut.

=== Third Test ===
6–8 July 1961
(5-day match)
Scorecard

Australia	v	England
237 (110 overs); R.N. Harvey 73; C.C. McDonald 54; Trueman, F.S. 5/58 (22 overs)		299 (149 overs); M.C. Cowdrey 93; Pullar, G. 53; A.K. Davidson 5/63 (47 overs); G.D. McKenzie 3/64 (27 overs)
120 (52.5 overs); R.N. Harvey 53; Trueman, F.S. 6/30 (15.5 overs)		62/2 (23 overs); Pullar, G. 26*; M.C. Cowdrey 22; A.K. Davidson 1/17 (11 overs)

England won by 8 wickets
Headingley, Leeds
Umpires: JS Buller and Langridge, J.G.

- Australia won the toss and elected to bat.
- The match was scheduled for five days but completed in three.

=== Fourth Test ===
27 July–1 August 1961
(5-day match)
Scorecard

Australia	v	England
190 (63.4 overs); W.M. Lawry 74; B.C. Booth 46; Statham, J.B. 5/53 (21 overs); E.R. Dexter 3/16 (6.4 overs)		367 (163.4 overs); P.B.H. May 95; Barrington, K.F. 78; Pullar, G. 63; R.B. Simpson 4/23 (11.4 overs); A.K. Davidson 3/70 (39 overs)
432 (171.4 overs); W.M. Lawry 102; A.K. Davidson 77*; N.C.L. O'Neill 67; Allen, D.A. 4/58 (38 overs); E.R. Dexter 3/61 (20 overs)		201 (71.4 overs); E.R. Dexter 76; R. Subba Row 49; R. Benaud 6/70 (32 overs)

Australia won by 54 runs
Old Trafford, Manchester
Umpires: Langridge, J.G. and Phillipson, W.E.

- Australia won the toss and elected to bat.
- 30 July was taken as a rest day.
- B.C. Booth (AUS) and Flavell, J.A. (ENG) made their Test debuts.

=== Fifth Test ===
17–22 August 1961
(5-day match)
Scorecard

England	v	Australia
256 (118.1 overs); P.B.H. May 71; Barrington, K.F. 53; A.K. Davidson 4/83 (34.1 overs); R.A. Gaunt 3/53 (24 overs)		494 (165.5 overs); P.J.P. Burge 181; N.C.L. O'Neill 117; B.C. Booth 71; Allen, D.A. 4/133 (30 overs); Statham, J.B. 3/75 (38.5 overs)
370/8 (177 overs); R. Subba Row 137; Barrington, K.F. 83; K.D. Mackay 5/121 (68 overs); R. Benaud 3/113 (51 overs)

Match drawn
The Oval, London
Umpires: Elliott, C.S. and Lee, F.S.

- England won the toss and elected to bat.
- 20 August was taken as a rest day.

Five years after their disastrous showing against Jim Laker, the Australians returned to the top of the international tree by retaining the Ashes in England only months after their victory over the West Indies in the Tied test series of 1960–1961 played "Down Under".

The 1961 series was a personal triumph for skipper Richie Benaud, whose match-winning bowling and astute leadership in the fourth Test at Old Trafford proved to be the decisive factor in the series. With the series square, England needed 256 to win and were expected to get them, but Benaud, by bowling his leg breaks round the wicket into some rough created by footmarks, took 6–70 to secure an Australian victory by 54 runs. The key moment came when he bowled the England captain Peter May behind his legs for a duck. The bemused May had to be told by Aussie keeper Wally Grout that he had been bowled.

Australia won the series by drawing the final Test at The Oval and it confirmed a supremacy over England that would endure throughout the decade.

England in 1961 was heavily reliant on the fast bowling of Fred Trueman, then at his peak. It was his brilliant performance at Headingley, where he took 11 wickets in the match, that earned England its only win in the series.

Peter May had missed the start of the series and he relinquished the captaincy at the end of the summer, telling the selectors he did not wish to be considered for any more overseas tours. At the age of 32, he hoped to continue playing for Surrey but, as it turned out, he was lost to the game. He was one of the last amateur cricketers and he decided to make his living in the City of London.

== The Tests in detail ==
After the first match was drawn, Australia had their traditional victory at Lord's (England not having defeated them there since 1934), by 5 wickets on a lively pitch. Davidson did the damage in the first England innings and McKenzie in the second. Lawry's 130 in Australia's first innings, when nobody else on either side made more than 66 in either innings, was crucial.

England won by 8 wickets at Headingley, Australia collapsing in their second innings from 99–2 to 120 all out, thanks to Trueman's devastating spell of off-cutters. He finished with figures of 6–30, having taken 5–58 in the first innings.

The Fourth Test at Old Trafford proved decisive. It was won by Australia by 54 runs. The last day was very exciting, seeing many turns of fortune. England had managed a first innings lead of 177. Australia's second innings had reached 331–6 at the close of the fourth day, a lead of 154. On the final morning, David Allen took 3 wickets quickly, reducing Australia to 334–9, and the game seemed won by England. But Davidson then took the attack to the bowlers, hitting Allen for 20 in an over, and with help from McKenzie added 98 for the last wicket. England needed 256 to win at 67 runs an hour. Ted Dexter, well supported by Raman Subba Row, scored 76 in 84 minutes and took England to 150–1, and strong favourites to win. But Benaud went round the wicket and aimed at the bowlers' footmarks, and caused a collapse. He finished with 6–70, and Australia won with 20 minutes to spare, thereby retaining The Ashes.

The final Test was drawn, after Australia had taken a big first innings lead.

== Ceylon ==
The Australians had a stopover in Colombo en route to England and played a one-day single-innings match there against the Ceylon national team, which at that time did not have Test status.

== Annual reviews ==
- Playfair Cricket Annual 1962
- Wisden Cricketers' Almanack 1962
