= Frank Misson =

Australian cricketer (1938–2024)

Personal information
- Full name: Francis Michael Misson
- Born: 19 November 1938; Darlinghurst, Sydney, New South Wales, Australia
- Died: 11 September 2024 (aged 85)
- Batting: Right-handed
- Bowling: Right-arm fast-medium

International information
- National side: Australia
- Test debut (cap 217): 30 December 1960 v West Indies
- Last Test: 22 June 1961 v England

Domestic team information
- Years: Team
- 1958–59 to 1963–64: New South Wales

Career statistics
Competition	Tests	First-class
Matches	5	71
Runs scored	38	1052
Batting average	19.00	17.53
100s/50s	0/0	0/2
Top score	25*	51*
Balls bowled	1197	12190
Wickets	16	177
Bowling average	38.50	31.13
5 wickets in innings	0	1
10 wickets in match	0	0
Best bowling	4/58	6/75
Catches/stumpings	6/0	58/0
- Source: CricketArchive

Francis Michael Misson (19 November 1938 – 11 September 2024) was an Australian cricketer who played in five Tests from December 1960 to June 1961. He played first-class cricket for New South Wales from 1958–59 to 1963–64.

== Career ==
Misson was a right-arm opening bowler who bowled outswingers at a lively pace and could use the short ball effectively. Early in his career he sometimes put so much energy into his deliveries that he fell over in his follow-through "in a thoroughly disorganised but highly diverting heap".

He made his first-class debut for New South Wales in the last match of the 1958–59 Sheffield Shield season against Western Australia, replacing the injured Gordon Rorke. He took three wickets in each innings as New South Wales won easily. He continued this good form throughout the 1959–60 season and was selected to tour New Zealand at the end of the season with the Australian team captained by Ian Craig. He took 17 wickets in three matches against New Zealand at an average of 12.47.

Misson made his Test debut in the Second Test of the series against West Indies in 1960–61, replacing Ian Meckiff. He dismissed Conrad Hunte with his second delivery, also took the wicket of Frank Worrell, and Australia won, but Meckiff returned for the Third Test. Misson played in the Fourth Test after Alan Davidson was injured, taking three wickets and falling as the third victim in a hat-trick taken by Lance Gibbs. He kept his place for the Fifth Test, when he took four wickets in Australia's victory.

He toured England in 1961 with the Australia team. In the match against Sussex, the last match before the First Test, he took his best first-class figures of 6 for 75 and added 136 for the eighth wicket with Peter Burge. He played in the first two Tests, taking seven wickets. In the Second Test he also made 25 not out batting at number 11, adding a valuable 49 for the last wicket with Ken Mackay. Australia won.

Misson was a fitness fanatic, but injuries to a calf and achilles tendon during the 1961 tour affected his form, and he never played Test cricket again. Using a shorter run-up and a changed action, he played three more seasons of Sheffield Shield cricket but with only moderate success. He had a season as a professional with Accrington in the Lancashire League in 1967, taking 50 wickets and scoring 340 runs; Accrington finished third. He retired from cricket to concentrate on his executive sales career.

== Personal life and death ==
Misson married Carole Reuben, an English athlete who competed at the Maccabiah Games for England and then for Australia after her marriage. They met during the tour of England in 1961. Their son David also competed for Australia in the Maccabiah Games, and was the fitness adviser for the Australia men's cricket team between 1998 and 2000.

Misson died on 11 September 2024, at the age of 85.
