= Des Hoare =

Australian sportsman (born 1934)

Personal information
- Full name: Desmond Edward Hoare
- Born: 19 October 1934 (age 92); Perth, Western Australia
- Batting: Right-handed
- Bowling: Right-arm fast-medium Legbreak

International information
- National side: Australia
- Only Test (cap 218): 27 January 1961 v West Indies

Domestic team information
- Years: Team
- 1955/56–1965/66: Western Australia

Career statistics
Competition	Test	First-class
Matches	1	63
Runs scored	35	1,276
Batting average	17.50	18.49
100s/50s	0/0	1/3
Top score	35	133
Balls bowled	232	12,425
Wickets	2	225
Bowling average	78.00	26.91
5 wickets in innings	0	12
10 wickets in match	0	1
Best bowling	2/68	8/98
Catches/stumpings	2/–	30/–
- Source: CricketArchive, 23 May 2020

Desmond Edward Hoare (born 19 October 1934) is an Australian former cricketer who played in one Test match in 1961. He also played Australian rules football for East Fremantle in the West Australian National Football League (WANFL).

== Life and career ==
A tall fast bowler and useful lower-order batsman, Hoare played for Western Australia from 1955–56 to 1965–66. He was selected in the Australian team for the Fourth Test against the West Indies in 1960–61, replacing the injured Alan Davidson. He took the wickets of Conrad Hunte and Frank Worrell and made 35 runs in a ninth-wicket partnership of 85 with Richie Benaud in the drawn match. He was omitted when Davidson returned to the team for the Fifth Test.

Hoare was not selected for the tour to England in 1961, and when the Australian touring team played Western Australia at the end of the 1960–61 season, he opened the batting for Western Australia and hit 133, his only century. His best bowling figures were 8 for 98 and 2 for 55 against New South Wales in 1964–65. In 1959–60 he took 6 for 18 off six overs to dismiss South Australia for 56; when Western Australia needed only 23 runs to win in the fourth innings, he and the 18-year-old Graham McKenzie, playing his second match for Western Australia, opened the innings and scored the runs to give Western Australia victory by 10 wickets.

Hoare played as the professional for Nelson in the Lancashire League in 1963 and 1964. He stayed in England in the off-season, working for a brewery, and missing the 1963–64 season in Australia. He used this experience later in his work as a sales representative for Swan Brewery in Perth.

Preceded by Johnny Wardle	Nelson Cricket Club; Professional; 1963–1964	Succeeded by Saeed Ahmed
