= 1957–58 Sheffield Shield season =

Australian cricket tournament

- Cricket format: First-class
- Tournament format: Double round-robin
- Champions: New South Wales (30th title)
- Participants: 5
- Matches: 20
- Most runs: Norm O'Neill (New South Wales) (1005)
- Most wickets: Ian Quick (Victoria) (32)

The 1957–58 Sheffield Shield season was the 56th season of the Sheffield Shield, the domestic first-class cricket competition of Australia. New South Wales won the championship for the fifth consecutive year.

== Table ==
Team	Played	Won	1st Inns Won	1st Inns Lost	Drawn	Lost	Points
New South Wales	8	4	1	2	0	1	48
Victoria	8	2	3	0	1	2	34
Queensland	8	1	3	2	1	1	24
Western Australia	8	2	1	2	0	3	24
South Australia	8	1	1	3	0	3	10

== Statistics ==
=== Most Runs ===
Norm O'Neill 1005

=== Most Wickets ===
Ian Quick 32
