= Cammie Smith =

West Indian cricketer

Personal information
- Full name: Cameron Wilberforce Smith
- Born: 29 July 1933 (age 93); Upper Dayrells Road, St Michael, Barbados
- Batting: Right-handed

International information
- National side: West Indies
- Test debut (cap 113): 9 December 1960 v Australia
- Last Test: 16 February 1962 v India

Domestic team information
- Years: Team
- 1951/52–1962/63: Barbados

Career statistics
Competition	Test	First-class
Matches	5	37
Runs scored	222	2,277
Batting average	24.66	37.32
100s/50s	0/1	5/10
Top score	55	140
Balls bowled	–	192
Wickets	–	3
Bowling average	–	32.33
5 wickets in innings	–	0
10 wickets in match	–	0
Best bowling	–	2/24
Catches/stumpings	4/1	31/4
- Source: Cricinfo, 30 October 2022

Cameron Wilberforce Smith (born 29 July 1933) is a former West Indian international cricketer from Barbados who played in five Test matches from 1960 to 1962.

Smith attended Harrison College in Bridgetown. At the age of 18 he made 80 on his first-class debut, batting at number three for Barbados against British Guiana in 1951–52. In his next match, against Jamaica, he made 140, putting on 243 for the second wicket with Conrad Hunte in an innings victory. He appeared regularly for Barbados through the 1950s as an opener or number three, scoring 116 against Jamaica in 1958 in a match where he also kept wickets (and took six catches).

He toured Australia with the West Indies in 1960–61, making his Test debut as an opener in the First Test in Brisbane, scoring 7 and 6. He was omitted from the Second Test but returned for the Third, scoring 16 and 55, and putting on 101 with Frank Worrell in "a delightful fourth-wicket century partnership in sixty-seven minutes". West Indies won by 222 runs. It remains his only fifty in Tests. In the final two Tests of the series he scored 28, 46, 11 and 37, when he "hooked the second ball from Misson over fine leg for six and he and Hunte had 50 on the board in as many minutes".

Smith began the 1961–62 season with an innings of 127, putting on 244 runs for the first wicket with Hunte against Jamaica. He played in the First Test against India, scoring 12 and 4 not out, and stumping Rusi Surti while substituting behind the stumps for Jackie Hendriks. But he lost his opening position to Easton McMorris for the Second Test, and played no further Tests.

He equalled his top score in 1962–63 when he made 140 against Trinidad and put on 318 for the second wicket with Seymour Nurse. He played in three first-class matches for Sir Frank Worrell's XI at the end of the 1964 English season, and one match for a Commonwealth XI in India in 1964–65 before retiring from first-class cricket. He played a few matches for the International Cavaliers in England in 1965, 1966 and 1967.

Smith worked as an insurance salesman. He later managed several West Indian teams, and also refereed 42 Tests and 118 ODIs between 1993 and 2002.
