= Australian cricket team in New Zealand in 1959–60 =

International cricket tour

An Australian national cricket team captained by Ian Craig toured New Zealand in February and March 1960.

The Australians won one of the four non-Test matches against New Zealand; the other three were drawn. There were two other first-class matches and three minor matches.

== Team ==
None of the Australian players who had been on the recently completed Test tour of India and Pakistan took part.

- Ian Craig (captain)
- Brian Booth
- Barry Fisher
- Ron Gaunt
- John Lill
- Len Maddocks
- Johnny Martin
- Frank Misson
- Jack Potter
- Ian Quick
- John Shaw
- Bob Simpson
- Keith Slater
- Grahame Thomas

The manager was H. C. Smith, the veteran Tasmanian administrator.

== Matches ==
First-class matches are indicated in bold.

- **Auckland v Australians**, Eden Park, Auckland, 12, 13, 15 February 1960. Australians 447 for 7 declared; Auckland 112 and 226. Australians won by an innings and 109 runs.
- Northern Districts v Australians, Seddon Park, Hamilton, 16, 17 February 1960. Australians 289 for 9 declared; Northern Districts 245. Drawn.
- **New Zealand v Australia**, Basin Reserve, Wellington, 19, 20, 22, 23 February 1960. New Zealand 229 and 193; Australia 201 and 201 for 7. Drawn.
- Nelson, Marlborough and Hutt Valley v Australians, Trafalgar Park, Nelson, 24, 25 February 1960. Nelson, Marlborough and Hutt Valley 147 and 149; Australians 405. Australians won by an innings and 109 runs.
- **New Zealand v Australia**, Lancaster Park, Christchurch, 27, 29 February, 1, 2 March 1960. New Zealand 374 and 143 for 9 declared; Australia 256 and 211 for 8. Drawn.
- **New Zealand v Australia**, Carisbrook, Dunedin, 4, 5, 7, 8 March 1960. New Zealand 163 and 245; Australia 200 and 209 for 2. Australia won by 8 wickets.
- South Island Minor Associations v Australians, Queens Park, Invercargill, 9, 10 March 1960. Australians 231; South Island Minor Associations 72 and 63. Australians won by an innings and 96 runs.
- **Central Districts v Australians**, Sportsground, Palmerston North, 12, 14, 15 March 1960. Central Districts 247 for 7 declared; Australians 58 for 0. Drawn.
- **New Zealand v Australia**, Eden Park, Auckland, 18, 19, 21, 22 March 1960. Australia 381 and 105 for 1 declared; New Zealand 203 and 149 for 8. Drawn.

== Leading players ==
Simpson and New Zealand's captain John Reid were the outstanding players in the four-match series. Simpson scored 418 runs at an average of 69.70 and took 10 wickets at 27.60, while Reid scored 292 runs at 41.70 and took eight wickets at 36.00. They were the leading run-scorers. Misson was Australia's leading wicket-taker, with 17 wickets at 11.89, while Gary Bartlett was New Zealand's, with 12 wickets at 31.00.
