= Horace Smith (Australian cricketer) =

Australian public servant and cricketer (1892–1977)

Personal information
- Full name: Horace Clitheroe Smith
- Born: 31 October 1892; Sandy Bay, Tasmania, Australia
- Died: 6 April 1977 (aged 84); Hobart, Tasmania, Australia
- Nickname: Clyde
- Batting: Right-handed

Domestic team information
- Years: Team
- 1913/14–1927/28: Tasmania

Career statistics
Competition	FC
Matches	6
Runs scored	146
Batting average	13.27
100s/50s	0/1
Top score	59
Balls bowled	96
Wickets	1
Bowling average	106.00
5 wickets in innings	0
10 wickets in match	0
Best bowling	1/95
Catches/stumpings	0/–
- Source: Cricinfo, 2 August 2026

Horace Clitheroe "Clyde" Smith ISO, CBE (31 October 1892 – 6 April 1977) was an Australian public servant, cricketer and cricket administrator. He played six first-class matches for Tasmania between 1913 and 1928. He was permanent head of the Tasmanian Department of Agriculture from the 1930s to the 1950s. He served as either secretary or chairman or president of the Tasmanian Cricket Association for most of the period from 1915 to his death in 1977.

== Biography ==
Smith was born in Hobart and educated there at Queen's College. He made his highest first-class score of 59 for Tasmania against Victoria in February 1922, when he and Colin Newton added 148 for the ninth wicket.

Smith was appointed honorary secretary to the Tasmanian Cricket Association (TCA) in 1915, at a time when the association was in danger of extinction. He converted a deficit of about £600 when he took on the job into a credit balance when he handed over to his successor seven years later. He was for many years president of the TCA, and represented Tasmania at meetings of the Australian Cricket Board of Control. He managed the Australian team that toured New Zealand in 1959–60. In 1968 the members' pavilion of the TCA Ground in Hobart was named the H. C. Smith Stand in his honour.

Smith joined the Tasmanian public service in 1911. He was clerk assistant and Usher of the Black Rod for the Tasmanian Legislative Council from 1913 to 1919. He joined the Department of Agriculture in 1919, and became head of the department in 1937. He also chaired several government boards, commissions and committees, including the Tasmanian Wheat Committee, the Tasmanian Sea Fisheries Board, and the Tasmanian Surveyors' Board.

In 1937 Smith was awarded the King George VI Coronation Medal for services to cricket. In 1943 he was made a Companion of the Imperial Service Order. In the 1956 New Year Honours he was made a Commander of the Order of the British Empire.

Smith married Kathleen Grace Ingall in Sydney in December 1929. She died in Sydney in June 1943; they had one son. Smith died in Hobart in April 1977, aged 84.
