= Geoff Pullar =

English cricketer (1935–2014)

- Pullar in 1962

Personal information
- Full name: Geoffrey Pullar
- Born: 1 August 1935; Swinton, Lancashire, England
- Died: 25 December 2014 (aged 79)
- Nickname: Noddy
- Batting: Left-handed
- Bowling: Legbreak

International information
- National side: England
- Test debut: 2 July 1959 v India
- Last Test: 25 January 1963 v Australia

Career statistics
Competition	Test	First-class
Matches	28	400
Runs scored	1,974	21,528
Batting average	43.86	35.34
100s/50s	4/12	41/111
Top score	175	175
Balls bowled	66	659
Wickets	1	10
Bowling average	37.00	38.70
5 wickets in innings	0	0
10 wickets in match	0	0
Best bowling	1/1	3/91
Catches/stumpings	2/–	124/–
- Source: CricInfo, 6 November 2022

Geoffrey Pullar (1 August 1935 – 25 December 2014) was an English cricketer, who played for Lancashire and Gloucestershire and in 28 Tests for England.

His affectionate nickname was 'Noddy', not, as often said, because, once he was out, he was known to sleep often in the dressing room, but because he was once discovered watching the children's programme there.

He was, in any case, a batsman, rarely lifting the ball off the surface while driving at accumulating by flicking the ball off his toes towards fine leg. Preferring to play off the front foot, Pullar was also a puller of the ball and could crack a square cut. In his younger days he had been compared to Charlie Hallows and Eddie Paynter, two of Lancashire's crowd greats – he had the artistry of the former and the aggression and determination of the latter.

== Life and career ==
Pullar was born in Swinton, Lancashire, in 1935, and was a product of Werneth Cricket Club, which was close to where he went to school in Oldham; while there he showed equal talent as a leg break bowler as well as with his batting – but with Tommy Greenhough, Bob Barber and Sonny Ramadhin variously based at Old Trafford, Pullar's bowling was rarely called upon in first-class cricket.

Originally a middle order batsman, the left-handed Pullar was tried as an opener in Test matches against India in 1959, and was an instant success, scoring 75 at Headingley, and 131 at Old Trafford, the first ever Test century by a Lancastrian at the ground. He then became a fixture in the England side for four years, making four centuries in all and averaging more than 43. Pullar did well against South Africa at home series of 1960, following a solid winter tour of the West Indies where he played in all five tests against a bowling attack including Wes Hall, Garfield Sobers and Charlie Griffith who had his debut in the fifth test. He had a good tour to India and Pakistan in 1961–62, and topped the batting averages despite bagging a pair in the first Test in Pakistan. His highest Test score was 175 against the South Africans at The Oval in 1960, when he put on 290 for the first wicket with Colin Cowdrey. He had modest success against the Australians in 1961, when Alan Davidson snared him five times, and Pullar only played twice against Pakistan in England in 1962, scoring only 27 runs in two knocks while others, notably Peter Parfitt, scored freely against a moderate attack. After the tour to Australia in 1962–63, during which he fell ill with pleurisy, Pullar lost his England place and never regained it.

After some years of declining success for Lancashire, he joined Gloucestershire in 1969, and topped the county's batting averages in his first season. But arthritis in his knees forced his retirement after just six matches the following year.

Pullar was elected Young Cricketer of the Year in 1959 by the Cricket Writers' Association (a year in which he scored three tons against the champions, Yorkshire) and he was one of the Wisden Cricketers of the Year in 1960. He also won a junior England cap for table tennis.

Pullar died at age 79 on 25 December 2014.
