= Mark O'Neill (cricketer) =

Australian cricketer

Personal information
- Full name: Mark Dorian O'Neill
- Born: 5 March 1959 (age 67); Sutherland, Sydney, New South Wales, Australia
- Batting: Right-handed
- Bowling: Right arm leg spin

Domestic team information
- Years: Team
- 1979/80–1981/82: Western Australia
- 1982/83–1990/91: New South Wales

Career statistics
Competition	FC	LA
Matches	76	21
Runs scored	3.729	329
Batting average	35.17	18.27
100s/50s	9/18	0/2
Top score	178*	66
Balls bowled	4,270	334
Wickets	36	12
Bowling average	53.75	21.25
5 wickets in innings	0	0
10 wickets in match	0	0
Best bowling	3/47	3/27
Catches/stumpings	29/–	7/–
- Source: CricketArchive, 11 November 2014

Mark Dorian O'Neill (born 5 March 1959) is a former Australian cricketer who played first-class cricket from 1979 to 1991. He is the son of the former Test cricketer Norm O'Neill and athlete Gwen Wallace.

A right-handed batsman and leg spin bowler, O'Neill showed such promise in his youth that at 18 he became the youngest-ever Lancashire League professional, playing two seasons for Bacup in 1977 and 1978. He made his debut for Western Australia in the 1979–80 season, aged 20. After three seasons, he moved to New South Wales where he remained for the rest of his career. In 1980 he worked for the MCC at Lord's. O'Neill's highest first-class score was 178 not out for New South Wales against South Australia in 1985–86.

After his retirement from playing, O'Neill became a batting coach and worked with New Zealand, New South Wales and Western Australia. He was recruited by Middlesex as their first specialist batting coach for the 2010 season before returning to Australia on a permanent basis after three years.

== See also ==
- List of New South Wales representative cricketers
- List of Western Australia first-class cricketers

Sporting positions
Preceded by New position	Middlesex Batting Coach; 2010–2012	Succeeded by Mark Ramprakash
