= Ian Quick =

Australian cricketer

Personal information
- Full name: Ian William Quick
- Born: 5 November 1933 (age 93); Geelong, Victoria, Australia
- Batting: Right-handed
- Bowling: Slow left-arm orthodox

Domestic team information
- Years: Team
- 1956/57–1961/62: Victoria

Career statistics
| Competition | First-class |
|---|---|
| Matches | 63 |
| Runs scored | 816 |
| Batting average | 14.06 |
| 100s/50s | 0/1 |
| Top score | 61* |
| Balls bowled | 14,275 |
| Wickets | 195 |
| Bowling average | 30.46 |
| 5 wickets in innings | 7 |
| 10 wickets in match | 1 |
| Best bowling | 7/20 |
| Catches/stumpings | 32/– |
- Source: Cricinfo, 7 May 2023

Ian William Quick (born 5 November 1933) is a former Australian cricketer who played for Victoria in first-class cricket from 1957 to 1961. Though Quick by name, he was an orthodox slow left-arm bowler.

Quick was the leading wicket-taker in the 1957-58 Sheffield Shield competition, with 32 wickets at an average of 27.84. He also had the best bowling figures of the season, 7 for 47 against Western Australia in the final match.

Although Quick never played in a Test match, he did tour New Zealand in 1960 and England in 1961 with Australian teams. He played in all four representative matches against New Zealand, taking 14 wickets at an average of 24.21. He also took his best first-class figures in New Zealand: 7 for 20 and 5 for 78 in the opening match of the tour against Auckland, which the Australians won by an innings. He took 50 wickets at an average of 34.00 on the tour of England, but seldom troubled the best batsmen and was unable to break into the Test side when Richie Benaud was injured.

Quick played only one match for Victoria in 1961-62 then left first-class cricket to concentrate on his career as an engineer at the Ford factory in Geelong, his home town. He first met his wife Cora at a dance in Northampton during the 1961 tour.
