= John Parker (Australian cricketer) =

Australian cricketer (1936–2018)

Personal information
- Full name: John Francis Parker
- Born: 13 March 1936; Perth, Western Australia
- Died: 7 October 2018 (aged 82)
- Batting: Right-handed
- Source: Cricinfo, 3 November 2017

John Parker (13 March 1936 – 7 October 2018) was an Australian cricketer. He played thirty first-class matches for Western Australia between 1960/61 and 1964/65, scoring nine half centuries and a century (139*).
