= Ron Gaunt =

Australian cricketer

Personal information
- Full name: Ronald Arthur Gaunt
- Born: 26 February 1934; York, Western Australia
- Died: 30 March 2012 (aged 78); Sydney
- Batting: Left-handed
- Bowling: Right-arm fast

International information
- National side: Australia
- Test debut (cap 210): 24 January 1958 v South Africa
- Last Test: 24 January 1964 v South Africa

Career statistics
Competition	Test	First-class
Matches	3	85
Runs scored	6	616
Batting average	3.00	10.44
100s/50s	0/0	0/0
Top score	3	32*
Balls bowled	716	16,088
Wickets	7	266
Bowling average	44.28	26.85
5 wickets in innings	0	10
10 wickets in match	0	0
Best bowling	3/53	7/104
Catches/stumpings	1/–	31/–
- Source: Cricinfo, 24 May 2020

Ronald Arthur Gaunt (26 February 1934 – 30 March 2012) was an Australian cricketer who played in three Test matches between 1958 and 1964.

He was chiefly a fast bowler, who took 266 wickets in first-class cricket at an average of 26.85, playing first for Western Australia and then for Victoria. His opportunities to play for Australia were restricted by the presence of Alan Davidson, Garth McKenzie and Ian Meckiff in the team at that time. But he took the wicket of Dick Westcott in his first over in Test cricket after being flown into Durban to replace an injured Meckiff. In all, he took 7 wickets for Australia at an average of 44.28.

After he retired from playing, he became a successful coach and was involved in the development of Merv Hughes and Tony Dodemaide among others. He later took up golf and was an active member of the Eastern Golf Club at Doncaster in Victoria for many years.
