= Lindsay Kline =

Australian cricketer

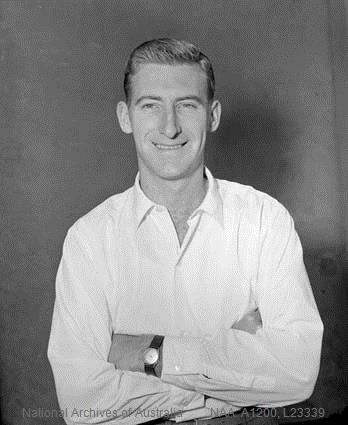
- Kline in 1957

Personal information
- Born: 29 September 1934; Melbourne, Victoria, Australia
- Died: 2 October 2015 (aged 81); Melbourne, Victoria, Australia
- Batting: Left-handed
- Bowling: Slow left-arm wrist-spin
- Role: Bowler

International information
- National side: Australia
- Test debut (cap 207): 23 December 1957 v South Africa
- Last Test: 27 January 1961 v West Indies

Career statistics
Competition	Test	First-class
Matches	13	88
Runs scored	58	559
Batting average	8.28	8.59
100s/50s	0/0	0/0
Top score	15*	37*
Balls bowled	2,373	18,527
Wickets	34	276
Bowling average	22.82	27.39
5 wickets in innings	1	11
10 wickets in match	0	0
Best bowling	7/75	7/75
Catches/stumpings	9/0	56/0
- Source: CricInfo, 13 August 2020

Lindsay Francis Kline (29 September 1934 – 2 October 2015) was an Australian cricketer. He played in 13 Test matches for Australia and 88 first-class matches between 1955/56 and 1961/62. He was a left-arm spin bowler, bowling left-arm unorthodox spin.

Kline is probably best remembered for his involvement in the outcome of two Test matches of the 1960/61 West Indies tour of Australia. He was the batsman who faced the seventh ball of the last over off Wes Hall in the famous Tied Test between Australia and West Indies at the Gabba in Brisbane in 1960. He also partnered all-rounder Ken Mackay in a 109-minute last wicket stand in the Fourth Test of the same series at the Adelaide Oval which forced a remarkable draw.

Kline is one of the few cricketers to have taken a hat-trick in Test cricket, which he did in Cape Town in 1957/58 in his second Test.

In the Second Test in Lahore in 1959/60, he took 7 wickets for 75 in the 2nd innings. Despite playing well in India and Pakistan, his form dropped at home. He was in the touring party to England in 1961 but did not play in any of the Test matches.

Kline attended Camberwell High School from 1949 to 1950.
