= Alan Davidson (cricketer, born 1929) =

Australian cricketer (1929–2021)

Alan Davidson AM MBE
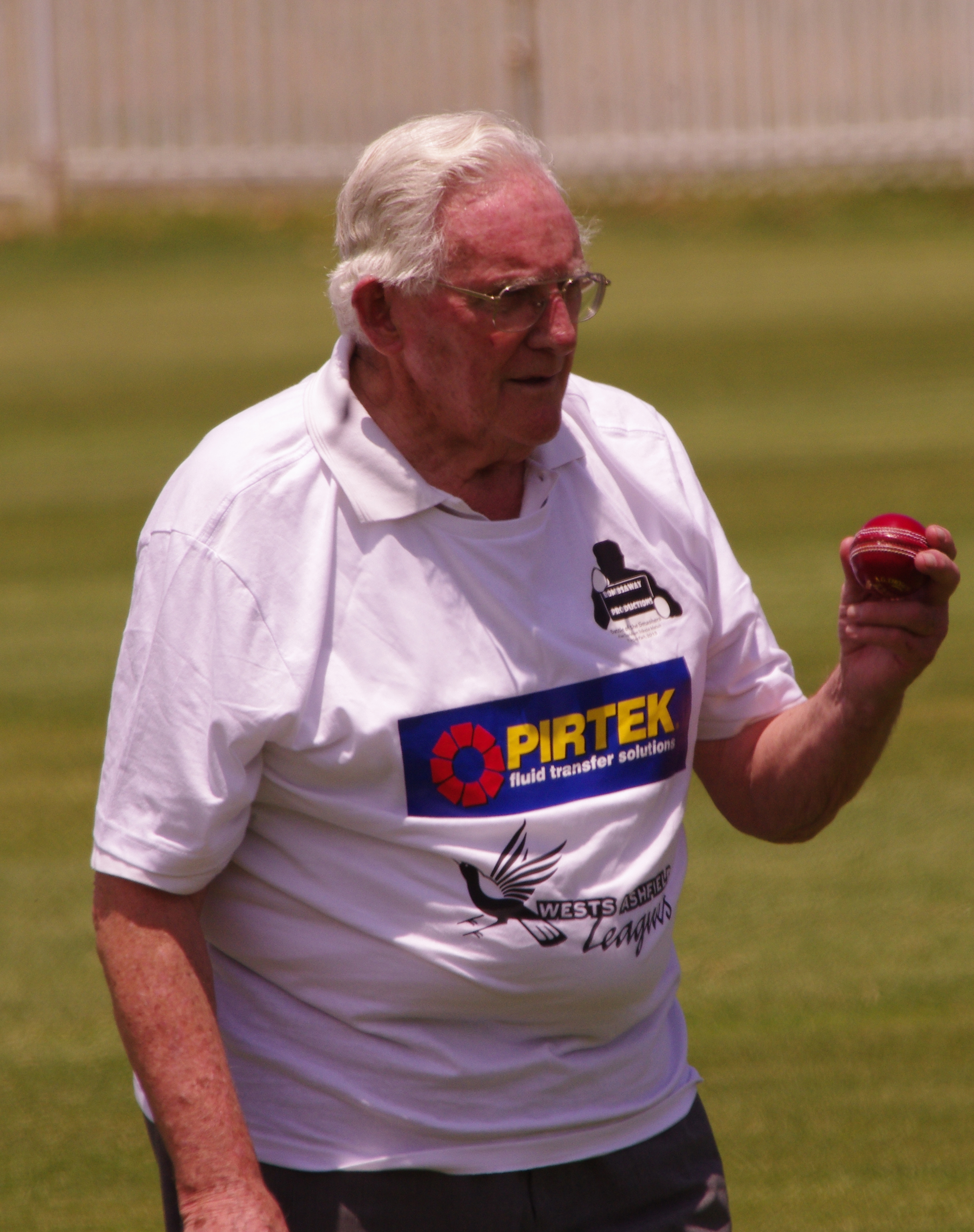
- Davidson in 2014

Personal information
- Full name: Alan Keith Davidson
- Born: 14 June 1929; Lisarow, New South Wales, Australia
- Died: 30 October 2021 (aged 92); Sydney, New South Wales, Australia
- Nickname: The Claw
- Batting: Left-handed
- Bowling: Left-arm fast-medium
- Role: All-rounder

International information
- National side: Australia (1953–1963)
- Test debut (cap 195): 11 June 1953 v England
- Last Test: 20 February 1963 v England

Domestic team information
- Years: Team
- 1949/50–1962/63: New South Wales

Career statistics
| Competition | Test | First-class |
|---|---|---|
| Matches | 44 | 193 |
| Runs scored | 1,328 | 6,804 |
| Batting average | 24.59 | 32.86 |
| 100s/50s | 0/5 | 9/36 |
| Top score | 80 | 129 |
| Balls bowled | 11,587 | 37,704 |
| Wickets | 186 | 672 |
| Bowling average | 20.53 | 20.90 |
| 5 wickets in innings | 14 | 33 |
| 10 wickets in match | 2 | 2 |
| Best bowling | 7/93 | 7/31 |
| Catches/stumpings | 42/– | 168/– |
- Source: Cricinfo, 26 December 2008

Alan Keith Davidson AM MBE (14 June 1929 – 30 October 2021) was an Australian cricketer of the 1950s and 1960s. He was a left-handed all rounder: a hard-hitting lower-order batsman, and an outstanding fast-medium opening bowler. Strongly built and standing six feet tall, Davidson was known for his hard hitting power, which yielded many long-hit sixes.

His bowling was a mainstay of the Australian pace attack of the 1950s and early 1960s, and from the late 1950s he was widely regarded as one of the finest pace bowlers in the world. Davidson's classical bowling action imparted late swing, allowing him to move the ball to deceive batsmen and he bowled with great control, conceding fewer than two runs per over across his career. In 2006, writer Geoff Armstrong considered that Davidson was, along with Wasim Akram, one of the two greatest left-arm fast bowlers in history.

Davidson was also known for his anticipation in close catching positions and his accurate and strong throwing arm from the outfield; his ability to take improbable close range catches saw him earn the nickname "The Claw". He was the first player to obtain the distinction of achieving the double of getting ten wickets and scoring 100 runs in the same Test match.

== Early years ==
The son of Leslie Keith Davidson and Hilda Aileen Clifton, Davidson grew up in Lisarow, New South Wales (NSW) near the city of Gosford on the NSW Central Coast. He learnt to play cricket on a pitch that he dug out of a hill on his family's rural property. By the age of nine, he was playing in the second division of the Gosford grade competition. Throughout his high school years, he represented Northern High Schools in the state combined public schools' competition where he played against his future Test captain Richie Benaud, who captained City High Schools. During his teenage years, Davidson kept fit by working on the family property, chopping wood and carrying farm produce.

Davidson originally bowled left arm unorthodox spin, but when his uncle's team was missing a fast bowler in a country match, Davidson stepped in, remaining a fast bowler permanently. In 1948–49, he moved to Sydney and joined the Northern Districts grade club. A talented rugby league player in his youth, he trained with the Western Districts Football Club in the off season to maintain his fitness.

The Australian Test team was touring South Africa in 1949–50, creating opportunities for young players back home. This was especially true with respect to fast bowling, as Keith Miller and Ray Lindwall, Australia's two leading pacemen, were from New South Wales and were in South Africa. In addition, Ernie Toshack, who had been in the Test team since World War II, had broken down.

Amid this environment, Davidson was selected for New South Wales. On debut against South Australia, Davidson claimed the wicket of Bob McLean with his second ball and finished with 4/32. He then made 34 with the bat as New South Wales took a 282-run lead, but was unsuccessful in the second innings, taking 0/90 as South Australia held on for a draw.

He finished the season strongly, with 19 wickets in the last three matches against Queensland, South Australia and Victoria. This included a haul of 5/28 and 2/37 as he helped New South Wales to a win over their arch-rivals Victoria, who had defeated them earlier in the season. His debut season ended with 26 wickets at 18.73. He did not surpass his debut innings with the bat and ended with 110 runs at 15.71.

These performances earned him selection for the Australian Second XI tour of New Zealand under Bill Brown. Most of the matches were not first-class, and in the match against Wairarapa he showed his all round skills by taking all ten wickets for 29 and then made an unbeaten 157, helping Australia to a win by an innings and 466 runs. In the only international match against New Zealand for the tour, Davidson made a duck and took 0/36 in the first innings. He then took 4/24 in the second innings, including the wickets of Bert Sutcliffe and Verdun Scott to help instigate a collapse. The hosts were 9/76, only eight runs ahead, when time ran out. He ended his maiden tour in Australian colours with nine wickets at 18.22 and 18 runs at 6.00 in three first-class matches.

With the return of the Test players for the 1950–51 season, Davidson had to perform strongly when given opportunities in order to hold his position. He started his season productively by taking 7/49 in the first innings of the opening match against Queensland, including the wickets of Test players Ken Archer, Colin McCool and Don Tallon, but he expressed disappointment at his erratic line and length, frequently bowling full tosses and long hops. New South Wales won by an innings, and Davidson took four wickets in the return match, but results began to dry up thereafter. He had the opportunity to show his skills against Test opposition as New South Wales played England ahead of the Tests, but he went wicketless, and was dropped in December after the next match against Western Australia. Davidson ended the season with 14 wickets at 22.71 and 42 runs at 10.50 from four matches.

Despite another season of limited opportunities in 1951–52—he played in only four matches—Davidson continued to improve. He struggled at the outset, taking only four wickets at 41.25 in his four innings, before breaking through against a full-strength Victorian team. He broke through for his first half-century, scoring 76 before being bowled by Bill Johnston— at the time ranked the No. 1 bowler in the world. He then took 4/93 in the second innings, removing Test captain Lindsay Hassett and Australian representatives Ian Johnson and Doug Ring. He then took five wickets in a match against Queensland before bowling his state to victory over Western Australia in his final match for the summer. He took 6/13 to cut down Western Australia for 50 and took 3/36 in the second innings to seal a 250-run win. Davidson ended the season with 22 wickets at 18.00 and 137 runs at 27.40.

Davidson brought himself to the verge of Test selection in 1952–53; it was the first summer during which he commanded a regular place in a full-strength New South Wales team. He took a total of 6/74 in the second match of the season against Queensland, and then impressed against the touring South African Test team. He took a total of 4/113, including batsmen Jackie McGlew and Russell Endean. Steady wicket-taking, combined with an all round performance of 66, 40 and 3/89 against Western Australia saw Davidson selected for the Australian XI, which took on South Africa in what was effectively a dress rehearsal for the Tests. He managed only nine with the bat, but took 5/108 in the only innings of the match. Nevertheless, he was overlooked for Test selection. He took 41 wickets at 26.75 and scored three half-centuries with the bat to total 418 runs at 34.83.

Following these consistent performances, Davidson was selected for the 1953 Ashes tour. He improved on his career best in consecutive matches against Tasmania before the Australians sailed to England, scoring 87 and 90. The second effort featured a 167-run partnership with Richie Benaud. It was to be the first of many joint efforts by the pair of bowling all rounders for Australia over the next ten years. Davidson then took 3/45 with the ball, including the wickets of Miller and leading Australian batsman Neil Harvey.

== Early international career ==
After being omitted in the opening tour match against Worcestershire, Davidson made his debut on English soil against Leicestershire. He scored 63, featuring in a century partnership with Harvey, before taking 2/23 and 0/35 in an innings victory. In the next match against Yorkshire, he removed Len Hutton, regarded as the best batsman in the world at the time. In the nine first-class matches leading up to the Tests, Davidson performed steadily without being spectacular. He scored two fifties and passed 20 in every completed innings to aggregate 317 runs at 45.28, and took 17 wickets at 22.12, taking more than two wickets in an innings on only one occasion. That occasion was against the Marylebone Cricket Club, which was a virtual England Test team, while Australia fielded their strongest possible team. In what was effectively a dress rehearsal for the Tests, Davidson took 2/17 and 3/49, removing Trevor Bailey, Godfrey Evans, Johnny Wardle, Tom Graveney and leading batsman Denis Compton.

When the Tests started at Trent Bridge, Davidson was named in the playing XI. He supported the pace attack of Miller, Lindwall and Johnston in the five Tests. His debut in the First Test was unremarkable. As with most of Australia's batsmen, Davidson struggled against Alec Bedser, who broke the English Test wicket-taking record in the wet conditions, making only four and six. He took 2/22 in the first innings as the match ended in a rain affected draw. His first Test wicket was that of Hutton, caught by Benaud, and he added Evans in the latter part of the innings.

He scored a hard hitting 76 in the first innings of the Second Test at Lord's to help Australia take control, but a stubborn partnership by Bailey and Willie Watson saw England hang on for a draw. Davidson bowled only 24.5 overs for the match, and Wardle was his only wicket. Rainy weather greeted the players in the Third Test at Old Trafford and more than half the playing time was washed out. Davidson took 2/60 in the drawn match, removing Reg Simpson and Willie Watson. Australia were in a good position at the start of the final day of the Fourth Test at Headingley, with England leading by only 78 runs with five wickets in hand. However, Bailey (38) and Jim Laker (48) stubbornly resisted with a mixture of time-wasting and dour defence. Davidson eventually removed both, but there was not enough time remaining to secure an Australian victory. His match figures of 3/59 from 50.1 overs were in large part due to the defensive tactics of England. The fate of The Ashes thus came down to the Fifth Test at The Oval. Davidson scored 22 and 21 and could not take a wicket as England won by eight wickets to regain the urn for the first time in two decades. Australia had blundered by omitting a specialist spinner, mistakenly thinking that the pitch would not spin. Davidson hit England's spinners out of the attack for a period, but succumbed to the variable bounce of the pitch.

Davidson passed 25 in the Tests only once took two wickets on three occasions. He finished the series with 182 runs at 22.75 and his sparingly used bowling yielded eight wickets at 26.50. Despite this, he was Australia's sixth-highest run-scorer and third-leading wicket-taker.

Despite his lack of performance in the Tests, Davidson showed his potential with consistent performance throughout the tour. He compiled 944 runs at 41.04 during the tour and amassed five half centuries and a century. He scored three fifties in the last month of the tour, and after missing his maiden first-class century with 95 against Lancashire, he broke through with 104* against Somerset at County Ground, Taunton. He also took 50 wickets at 20.96 with the ball. Davidson was steady with the ball, never taking more than three wickets in an innings. He ranked seventh among the Australians in both run-scoring and wicket-taking.

During the tour, tensions sometimes arose between the senior players, who were war veterans and drinkers, while the younger players including Davidson tended to abstain from alcohol. Teammate Ian Craig estimated that bus journeys to matches proceeded at an average speed of 16 km/h because of persistent stoppages outside pubs, something that frustrated the non-drinkers. In the end, the young players had to the majority of the fielding as their older colleagues were often still intoxicated during matches.

The 1953–54 season was purely domestic, with no Tests scheduled. Davidson had a modest injury-hit season, scoring 76 runs at 19.00 and taking nine wickets at 32.71 in four matches. His best was a 4/50 against Queensland, and 3/89 in a testimonial match for retiring Australian captain Lindsay Hassett; he removed Test teammates Benaud, Ron Archer and Graeme Hole.

In 1954–55 England toured Australia for five Ashes Tests. Davidson started his season well, scoring 30 and 27 not out and taking a total of 5/104 as New South Wales drew with England. His victims included leading batsmen Colin Cowdrey and Bill Edrich. However, Davidson succumbed to injury and missed Australia's only win of the series in the First Test, and upon his return in the Second Test, managed match figures of 2/86 and did not pass twenty in either innings as England levelled the series. He was dropped for the Third Test, but continued to perform strongly in domestic matches, including a sequence of 19 wickets in three matches. This included 4/45 including the wickets of Compton, Bailey and Graveney in a tour match against England, and a match-winning performance against arch-rivals Victoria that sealed a second successive Shield triumph with a resounding nine-wicket win in two days. He tore through the Victorians with 5/36 and 4/50, removing Harvey and Test all rounder Sam Loxton twice. It was his best match bowling figures in his career to date.

Davidson was recalled for the Fourth Test, but managed only a wicket as England sealed the series 4–1. However, he then took a total of 6/68 as New South Wales defeated England; it was only the second time the tourists had lost for the summer. Davidson was retained for the final Test, his first on his home ground in Sydney, but was wicketless in a rain-affected draw. His Test series had been poor, with 71 runs at 14.20 and only three wickets at 73.33 as England retained the Ashes 3–1. Davidson had not tasted victory in any of his eight Tests. His poor Test form contrasted to his performances against England in tour matches; he took 15 wicket at 15.13 in three matches outside the Tests.

His overall bowling performance was strong, with 34 wickets at 23.18, although his batting was ineffective, with only 213 runs at 15.21 and a top-score of 30.

Davidson was selected for the 1954–55 tour of the West Indies, where he injured his right ankle in a tour match against Jamaica and missed the First Test against the West Indies. Upon his recovery, he could not break into the XI and did not play in any of the Tests, which Australia won 3–0. He scored 70 runs at 35.00 and took four wickets at 51.75 in three first-class outings.

After his injury-hit Caribbean sojourn, Davidson had the 1955–56 season, which was purely domestic, to force his way back into the national team for the 1956 tour of England. Johnston had also retired, leaving an extra vacancy for a pace bowler.

He started strongly with match figures of 7/87 in a drawn match against Queensland in Brisbane. The hosts managed to hang on with three wickets in hand, after Davidson's captain had held up play and wasted 20 minutes for the running of the Melbourne Cup. He performed steadily for the next six matches, not taking more than two wickets in any innings, before playing a prominent role in the final match of the Sheffield Shield season against Victoria. It was then 100th anniversary of matches between the old rivals. Davidson took 6/99 in the first innings, including Harvey for 128, before adding 2/61 in the second. It helped prevent a defeat on the anniversary and sealed New South Wales' hat-trick of Shield titles.

Davidson was selected for the England tour and then took 12 wickets and scored his only half-century of the season as the Australians warmed up before sailing abroad. He ended the Australian season with 350 runs at 31.81 and 36 wickets at 25.19.

Davidson had an interrupted lead-in to the Tests. He injured himself while batting in his sixth match, against the MCC, and was unable to take any further part in the match. He was out of action for two weeks but recovered in time for the First Test at Trent Bridge. He had scored 46 runs at 11.50 and took 13 wickets at 20.92 during his preparation.

In the First Test of the series at Nottingham, Davidson removed Cowdrey before his ankle slipped in a footmark during the first innings and a bone was chipped. He was carried off with figures of 1/22 and his ankle plastered. The injury was such that he was unable to bat even with the assistance of a runner and was absent. This injury sidelined him until August.

By the time of Davidson's return, England had retained the Ashes 2–1 after annihilating Australia by an innings in consecutive Tests. Prior to this, Australia had not lost by an innings since 1938, let alone twice in a row. The Surrey finger spin pairing of Jim Laker and Tony Lock had led the decimation, taking 38 of the 40 wickets of dry dusty wickets doctored for their use. In Australia's match against Surrey before the Tests, the pair had taken 19 wickets as the tourists lost to a county side for the first time since 1912.

As a result of the finger spinners' success, Australian captain Ian Johnson tried to convert Davidson into a left arm orthodox spinner. Davidson returned as Australia faced a fourth meeting with Laker and Lock, in a match against Surrey immediately after the two consecutive Test maulings. On a sticky wicket that played into the hands of the Surrey spinners, Australia were skittled for 143. Only Davidson, who took the attack to the pair, made 44 not out. One six that he lofted from Laker almost reached the iconic gasometer outside The Oval. The match was drawn, and Davidson took 2/50 including Eric Bedser and Laker in his new role as a slow bowler.

Davidson was able to force his way back into the team for the Fifth Test at The Oval. He scored eight and took a total of 1/34 in another rain-marred draw. Johnson persisted in using Davidson as a spinner, but it was not effective. In eight matches, the ploy yielded only 12 wickets at 24.25. Johnson was criticised for this novel strategy; cricket writer Ray Robinson said "I have not met one good cricketer or cricket judge who is not mystified by them [Johnson's tactics]". Davidson felt that Johnson tried to rely too heavily on the senior players and should have placed more responsibility on the likes of Richie Benaud, Ron Archer and himself. Overall Davidson scored 270 runs at 27.00 with two fifties and took 26 wickets at 22.50 in England.

On the return leg to Australia, the team stopped on the Indian subcontinent. Davidson's 37 in the inaugural one-off Test against Pakistan was his first score beyond 25 in nine Tests. He was bowled sparingly with a total of 2/15 from 15 overs as Australia lost by nine wickets. A muscle problem stopped Davidson from playing against India in the First Test in Madras, which Australia won by an innings. He played only in the Second Test, with pacemen Miller and Ron Archer injured and unavailable. It got worse for Australia as Davidson and fellow paceman Pat Crawford were hampered by stomach bugs and a hip strains respectively. Davidson scored 16 and took match figures of 1/42; Australia were unable to finish off the Indians with their depleted attack and the match ended in a draw. Davidson was left out of the Third Test win, so his overseas tour had ended without a Test victory, and only 64 runs at 16.00 and his underused bowling yielded five wickets at 22.60. In total, he had played twelve Tests, none of them resulting in an Australian victory. His individual performances were also unimpressive despite being successful at first-class level, producing only 317 runs at 18.64 and 16 wickets at 34.06. It was to be another year before Davidson tasted victory at the highest level.

== Australia's leading bowler ==
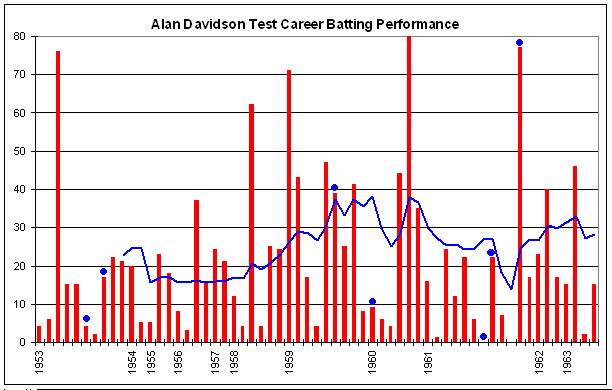
Davidson's Test career batting performance. The red bars indicate the runs that he scored in an innings, with the blue line indicating the batting average in his last ten innings. The blue dots indicate an innings where he remained not out.

With captain Johnson and vice captain Miller, the main spinner and one of the two leading fast bowlers retiring upon their return from the subcontinent, Australia moved into uncharted territory and needed younger bowlers to step up following three successive series losses to England. The 1956–57 Australian season was purely domestic and a chance for the players to stake their claims to be part of Australia's future. Davidson scored 374 runs at 34.00 including three fifties and took 30 wicket at 27.50 from eight matches. His most effective effort was a 5/65 in the second innings of the match between Harvey's XI and Lindwall's XI. Davidson's effort helped set up a seven-wicket triumph for Harvey's men.

Over the winter, with Test vacancies beckoning, Davidson and Benaud became training partners and decided to bowl for three hours continuously on a daily basis through the winter off season. With Ray Lindwall dropped, Davidson and Benaud became Australia's leading paceman and spinner when the team for the 1957–58 tour of South Africa was announced. It was a heavy burden on Davidson, who had only taken two Test wickets in an innings four times, and three wickets in a Test match on one occasion. The team was to be led by Ian Craig, who had played only six Tests, and at the age of just 22 years, he was the youngest ever Test captain from any country.

Davidson started the tour well, when Australia arrived in Rhodesia (now Zimbabwe) to play two tour matches against the Rhodesia. He made an unbeaten 100 and took a total of 3/67 in the first match in Salisbury, before scoring 19 and taking 5/36 and 2/22 in the second in Bulawayo. Australia won both by an innings.

The Australians crossed the border into South Africa and Davidson scored 100 and took a total of 4/62 against Transvaal as Craig's men started with a nine-wicket win. The next match was against a South African XI, and was effectively a dress rehearsal for the Tests. Davidson scored 34 and took a total of 7/103 as the Australians crushed the hosts by an innings. He rounded off his Test preparation with match figures of 6/35 against Border and a 76 against Western Province.

Despite the highly productive lead-up, Davidson faltered in his first outing as Australia's Test spearhead. He conceded 1/115 in only 32 overs in the first innings as South Africa reached 9/470 in the First Test in Johannesburg. With Australia 102 behind on the first innings, Davidson's tour nearly ended. Unable to cope with the 10 pm curfew imposed by team manager Jack Norton, Davidson and roommate Les Favell absconded and went sightseeing. By the time they had returned, Norton had confiscated their keys and left them a note asking them to report. The pair then went to sleep at the home of some supporters who had hosted the team for dinner the previous day.

The next day, Davidson faced dismissal from the team, but he overcame the turmoil to take 6/34, his first five wicket haul. This included a seven-over spell before lunch that yielded three wickets and reduced South Africa to 4/19, before the match ended in a draw. Davidson, Favell and their hosts all told Norton that the pair of cricketers had stayed the entire night at the home. The duo were not sent home the curfew was repealed.

The Second Test in Cape Town saw an Australian victory, the first in Davidson's 14 Tests. He took 2/31 and 2/18 as South Africa lost by an innings after being forced to follow on. It was during this match that Davidson earned his famous reputation for injury complaints, something that became a constant source of humour; he spent so much time on the massage table that his teammates attached a plaque that read "The AK Davidson Autograph Treatment Table". Benaud reported that Davidson persistently complained to captain Craig about an injury before delivering the next ball with high pace and swing.

He then scored 123 against Natal before the Third Test in Durban, where he took 2/62 in a drawn match. In the Fourth Test in Johannesburg, Davidson made 62, his first Test half century in over four years, and took a total of 3/83 in a ten-wicket victory. He then took match figures of 7/55 against Griqualand West and recorded his best first-class score of 129 in a match against Western Province in Cape Town. He then took 5/38 to help seal another innings win.

In the Fifth Test at Port Elizabeth, Davidson took 4/44 and then 5/38 in the second innings as he and Benaud took all ten wickets and South Africa were skittled for 144. Australia won by eight wickets and took the series 3–0. It was his best Test match haul to date. He scored 127 runs at 21.17 and took 25 wickets at 17.0 in the Tests. He had success against Russell Endean and John Waite, dismissing both twice. Although he was unable to score heavily in the Tests, Davidson scored four of his nine first class centuries during the tour. In all, he had taken 72 wickets at 15.13 and scored 813 runs at 54.20 for the entire tour. From this tour onwards, in 32 Tests, he was to take 170 wickets at 19.26 and score 1011 runs at 27.32 in the remainder of his career.

The 1958–59 English tour of Australia saw Davidson lead the attack for the first time in Australia. It was Australia's first series on home soil since the last English visit four years earlier and came on the back of three successive Ashes series losses. Davidson started well with match figures of 5/66 as Australia took the First Test in Brisbane by eight wickets. In the Second Test in Melbourne, Davidson took 6/64 in the first innings to help bowl out the tourists for 259 and put Australia in control. This included an opening spell in which he removed the three top order English batsmen Peter Richardson, Watson and Tom Graveney without conceding a run. He had Richardson caught behind from the first ball of his second over, before yorking Watson with the fourth ball for duck and trapping Graveney leg before wicket from the next delivery with an inswinger. This brought England captain Peter May to the crease, but Davidson'a hat-trick ball was off target and no shot was offered. He later returned to remove Colin Cowdrey, Brian Statham and Peter Loader.

In the second innings, he bowled unchanged with Ian Meckiff, taking 3/41, and taking two reflex catches in the leg trap from Meckiff, as England were cut down for 87 and Australia took an eight-wicket win and a 2–0 lead. Davidson's least penetrative match was the Third Test in Sydney, taking a match total of 2/84. It coincided with Australia's only non-victory of the series. Davidson scored 71 as the match ended in a draw. He took three and five wickets in the final two Tests, both of which Australia won. Davidson ended the series with 24 wickets at 19.00. With the bat, Davidson had his most productive Test series yet, scoring 180 runs at 36.00. Australia had defeated Peter May's team, who were heavily favoured, with ease. According to cricket writer Gideon Haigh, "Davidson had the ball on a string".

Davidson added a century in a state match against South Australia and for the entire first-class season, he totalled 431 runs at 33.15 and 47 wickets at 18.04.

The 1959–60 season saw Davidson confronted with an arduous eight Test tour of the Indian subcontinent, with three and five Tests against Pakistan and India respectively. Flat and dry pitches unconducive to fast bowling combined with oppressive heat confronted the players. On the last tour, many of the Australians had fallen ill with food positioning, and Davidson had asked Donald Bradman, the Australian Chairman of Selectors if opting out of the tour was permitted. Bradman turned him down. Davidson was consistent throughout the Pakistan series, taking four wickets in each of the three Tests, to end with 12 wickets at 24.83. He also batted solidly, with 47 and 39* in the latter two Tests to end with 90 runs at 45.00. His contributions helped Australia to a 2–0 series result; it was the first time Pakistan had lost a Test on home soil and the pair of victories were its last in Pakistan for 39 years. He had particular success against Imtiaz Ahmed, removing him four times.

In the First Test against India in Delhi, Davidson took 3/22 in the first innings, removing both openers Pankaj Roy and Nari Contractor, and captain Polly Umrigar to help Australia seize the initiative and bowl out the hosts for 135. He then contributed four catches in the second as Australia took a 1–0 series lead with an innings victory.

The Second Test in Kanpur saw Davidson return his career best innings and match bowling figures. On a dry pitch and in searing temperatures unfavourable for fast bowling, he took 5/31 in the first innings as India were all out for 152. He then scored 41 as Australia replied with 219. In heat above 38 degrees Celsius, he bowled unchanged for the entire day to take 7/93 from 57.3 overs in the second innings. During the match, Davidson lost around 11 kg in weight. According to the Australians, it was the "harshest cricket environment" that they had encountered. Davidson said that he felt like a "bloody zombie".

Australia were left a target of 225 for victory. Davidson fell for eight as part of a Jasu Patel-inspired collapse. Patel took 14/124 and Australia were out for 105. This resulted in Australia's first loss in the fifteen Tests since Davidson began leading the attack, and their first at the hands of their hosts.

Davidson took 4/62 in the first innings of the Third Test in Delhi as Australia took a 98-run first innings lead, but he was unable to add to his tally in the second innings as the hosts' batsmen held on for a draw. He then took taking match figures of 5/69 and 5/113 in the last two matches as Australia managed to win the Fourth Test to take a hard-fought 2–1 series victory. Davidson had led the way with 29 wickets at 14.86 in a country regarded as a graveyard for fast bowling—in this era, the home team's attack was dominated by spinners. In six Tests in India, Davidson had taken 30 wickets at an average of 15.77.

== Tied Test ==
Davidson was at his all round peak during the 1960–61 series against West Indies. After taking eight wickets in the two opening matches of the season against Queensland, Davidson gave an indication of what was in store in the Tests when New South Wales played Frank Worrell's tourists. He struck 88 as the hosts amassed 6/429 declared and then took three top-order wickets, removing Cammie Smith, Rohan Kanhai and Gary Sobers, holder of the Test world record of 365. He ended with 4/26 as the West Indies fell for 111 and lost by an innings. He then completed his Test preparation with 122 not out against Victoria.

In the First Test against the West Indies cricket team in Brisbane, Davidson showed his all round skills as well as stamina in becoming the first player to take ten wickets and accumulate more than a hundred runs in a match. On the eve of the match, Davidson broke the little finger on his bowling hand during catching practice and was unable to move it. However, he decided to play after Bradman gave a motivational speech to the team ahead of the match.

On the first two days, he bowled thirty (eight ball) overs to take 5/135 in the first innings as the West Indies reached 453. He did much of the heavy lifting in removing four of the West Indies' batsmen, Conrad Hunte, Smith, Kanhai and Worrell. Australia took a small lead of 52 after reaching 505, with Davidson contributing 44. In the second innings, Davidson was left with a heavier workload after his new ball partner Meckiff broke down after four overs. He took 6/87 from 24.6 overs as the West Indies were restricted to 284. he was again responsible for cutting down the leading batsmen, removing Smith, Kanhai, Sobers and Worrell. This left Australia 233 runs to win with 312 minutes available on the last day. Former Australian Test batsman and journalist Jack Fingleton commented that "One sensed that the West Indies realised they were facing defeat". However, the tourists had other ideas.

Although time was plentiful, the pitch had begun to deteriorate and Australia look defeated after they had fallen to 5/57, prompting Davidson to join local batsman Ken Mackay at the crease. They took the score to 92 when Mackay fell and Australia's chances of winning looked remote as Davidson and Benaud reached tea at 6/109 with 124 runs still required with only the tailenders were to follow. Despite this, Benaud told chairman of selectors Don Bradman that he would still be going for an improbable victory in accordance with his policy of aggressive strategy. With an attacking partnership, the pair took Australia to within sight of the target. The pair added 50 runs in 55 minutes. Davidson hooked leading paceman Wes Hall repeatedly and Benaud attacked the spinners when Worrell took Hall off. Both men were noted for their hitting ability and viewed attack as their most effective chance of survival. Davidson hit four fours from the leg spin of Sonny Ramadhin, and the deficit dwindled to 60 with one hour remaining and 27 with 30 minutes to go. The pair took 17 runs from the next two overs, and regular boundaries and quickly run singles took Australia into what looked like a victorious position. They took the score to 226 with a seventh wicket partnership of 134. Only seven runs were required with four wickets in hand as time was running short. Benaud hit a ball into the covers and the pair attempted a quick single, but a direct hit from Joe Solomon saw Davidson run out for his highest Test score of 80. Davidson reflected "I was as dirty as anyone ever has been". Australia needed six runs from the final over with three wickets in hand but Benaud was caught and the last two players fell to run outs while attempting the winning run. The match was the first tie in Test cricket, and Davidson had achieved his unprecedented feat despite carrying a broken finger into the match. Bradman joked that he should break his finger before every match. During that same tied test match, he set a new record for becoming the first player to complete a double of 100 runs and 11 wickets in a same test match. The record was later achieved by only three other men in test cricket history including Ian Botham, Imran Khan and Shakib Al Hasan.

After this marathon effort, Davidson scored 81 as New South Wales defeated the tourists by an innings for the second time in the space of the month. He was only asked to bowl five overs after his efforts in Brisbane.

Davidson returned to a full workload as he helped Australia take a 1–0 series lead in the Second Test in Melbourne. He scored 35 in the first innings of 348, before taking 6/53 in the West Indies' reply of 181. He removed Joe Solomon, before removing the established batsmen Seymour Nurse and Kanhai to trigger a collapse. This allowed Benaud to enforce the follow on. Davidson took a further 2/51 in the second innings to set up a seven wicket victory. The teams moved to Sydney for the next Test, where Davidson's unhappy experiences on his home ground continued. The West Indies batted first and made 339; Davidson took 5/80, including Smith, Kanhai and Sobers. Davidson made 16 as Australia replied with 202 and were in trouble when Meckiff was forced off the field early in the tourists' second innings with injury. Davidson lifted and removed Hunte, Kanhai and Sobers for single figures with the new ball. However, he too was forced off with a hamstring tear. With Australia two men down, the West Indies recovered to 326 and set the hosts 464 for victory, which would have required a world record fourth innings score. Davidson managed only one as Australia lost by 222 runs. He had not had a Test win in Sydney in three attempts, the only Australian ground where he had not played in a victory. After missing the Fourth Test because of a month on the sidelines to recuperate from the hamstring tear, he returned for the Fifth Test with the series level at 1–1. He took match figures of 6/173, including five wickets with late swing in the second innings to help Australia secure the victory. Davidson scored 28 and 12 as Benaud's men stumbled in the run-chase before scraping home by two wickets.

In three and a half Tests, he accumulated 212 runs at 30.28 and totalled 33 wickets against the Caribbean visitors at a cost of 18.55, when the next best average of any bowler was 33. Davidson was regarded as the main factor in Australia's 2–1 series win. He ended the first-class season with 551 runs at 55.10 and 45 wickets at 20.62. These efforts led him to retain the number 1 ranking in ICC Test Bowlers ranking for 1961 (which he obtained in the previous year). The 1961 tour of England was Davidson's overseas farewell, and he had not been prolific on his two previous visits, never managing to take more than four wickets in an innings and totaling only 76 in 40 first-class matches.

He broke through for his first five-wicket haul on English soil in his fifth match against Glamorgan, taking 5/63 in the first innings and scoring an unbeaten 68. He added 90 in the next match against Gloucestershire before facing the MCC at Lord's in the traditional dress rehearsal for the Tests. He took 6/46 and 3/58 as Australia took victory. His wickets included leading Test batsmen Cowdrey and Ken Barrington. Davidson headed into the Tests with 257 runs at 42.83 and 26 wickets at 22.35 from eight matches.

Despite this form, his Test campaign started poorly with an ineffective 1/130 in the drawn First Test at Edgbaston. He then broke down with a back injury in a match against Kent and looked unlikely to play. With Benaud already sidelined with a shoulder injury, Australia looked severely weakened without their two main bowlers. Despite again complaining about frailties of his body, Davidson vowed to play and produce a special performance for friend and stand-in captain Neil Harvey in the Second Test at Lord's.

Davidson took copious amounts of capsulin, and he took his position in what was known as the "Battle of the Ridge" due to the presence of a ridge on the surface that yielded erratic bounce. He exploited this in the first innings, beating Raman Subba Row three times in the first over and striking Geoff Pullar in the shoulder. He then bowled Pullar and struck Ted Dexter twice in the chest. Dexter then hit a ball to short leg but was dropped. Davidson then removed Peter May and Barrington before ending with 5/42 as Australia dismissed the hosts for 206 to seize the initiative. Davidson credited the performance to the capsulin, which flowed into his lower body and in his own words, put his "backside on fire". Australia took a first innings lead of 134 and Davidson removed Subba Row and Barrington with the new ball in the second innings to end with 2/50 and help set up a five wicket victory. Davidson was at the crease when the winning runs were scored, albeit at the non-striker's end. It was the first time Davidson had tasted Test victory on English soil in three tours.

He then took 5/63 in the first innings of the Third Test at Headingley, removing Subba Row, May, Barrington and Ted Dexter at the top of the order, but Australia struggled with the bat and England lost only two wickets in reaching 62 in the second innings to level the series. Davidson took one of those wickets, removing Subba Row.

Davidson played a large role in the Fourth Test Old Trafford. Victory would give Australia an unassailable 2–1 series lead and retention of the Ashes. A loss would mean that Australia would need to win the Fifth and final Test to prevent England from reclaiming them. Australia started poorly, and Davidson made a duck as the tourists were dismissed for 190. Davidson then took 3/67, removing Pullar, May and Subba Row as England took a sizeable 177-run lead.

This appeared to be a match-winning lead after Australia had lost three wickets in quick succession to David Allen, leaving them at 9/334 with only a 157 run lead. Last man Graham McKenzie came to the crease to join Davidson, who had been in poor form with the bat, having failed to pass 22 in the past five matches in six weeks. Davidson said that "I was shaking like I had Parkinson's". May brought on the part-time spin of Brian Close and 15 runs came in two overs, helping Davidson to feel more at ease. At the time, Allen had bowled 25 maidens in 37 overs. Davidson responded to the situation by hitting Allen out of the attack. In Allen's 10th over for the day, Davidson took 20 runs. He lofted an off drive over the boundary for six, and drove through the covers for four from both the front and back foot. Davidson then hit the bowler out of the stadium onto the adjacent railway lines. Fred Trueman came on and struck Davidson on the foot with a yorker. Davidson responded with a three and a cut for four that brought up Australia's 400. He ended with a hard-hitting 77 not out, after a final wicket partnership of 98 in 102 minutes. This extended Australia's lead to 256 on the last day and gave them hope of stopping England from winning the match. England looked to be heading towards victory with seven wickets in hand and less than 100 runs required, but a Benaud-inspired collapse saw Australia home by 54 runs. Davidson knocked Brian Statham's off stump out of the ground to end the match and ended with 2/50. It was Australia's first victory at Old Trafford since 1902 and sealed the series.

He ended his final Test series on foreign soil with combined figures of 4/150 in the Fifth Test at The Oval, which was drawn. Davidson finished the series with 23 wickets at 24.87 and 151 runs at 30.20. He was again Australia's leading bowler on tour. Davidson bade farewell to the English first-class scene with a match-winning display with both bat and ball against AER Gilligan's XI. He took 3/45 and scored 65 and 60, helping Australia to scrape home by three wickets.

Davidson was in strong all round form in the 1961–62 Australian season, which was a purely domestic one. Against Victoria in Sydney, he scored 106 in a hard hitting innings with the tail. He made 58 of the 59 runs added in a last wicket partnership with Doug Ford, the other being a leg bye. The partnership lasted only 44 balls and Davidson managed to farm the strike and face 41 of these. The effort helped to set up a ten-wicket win. The following week against Western Australia in Perth, he made 108 after New South Wales had slumped to 6/38 to help the visitors recover to 218. New South Wales struggled in their second innings and Western Australia needed only 175 for victory. However, Davidson took his career best innings bowling figures of 7/31 to bowl out the hosts for 106 and seize a victory. In both matches against Queensland, Davidson took four quick wickets in the second innings to secure narrow victories after bold declarations. New South Wales won the Shield in that season with 64 of a maximum possible 80 points, playing aggressive cricket under Benaud. It was their ninth title in a row. Davidson was a key factor in the dominance, scoring 521 runs at 40.07 and taking 42 wickets at 13.62.

== Farewell and legacy ==
At the start of the season, Davidson announced that the 1962–63 Ashes series against England was to be his last in the international arena, citing family and business reasons for his retirement. He started the season with half-centuries in the three consecutive innings ahead of the Tests. The third of these was in a state match that resulted in an innings victory over England.

However, he started the Tests slowly, failing to take a wicket in the first innings of the First Test at Brisbane before securing 3/43 in the second as the match was drawn. He removed Barrington, Pullar and David Sheppard. However he returned to form with 96 and 4/80 against South Australia, and then added a milestone to his first-class career with a hat-trick against Western Australia in Perth. Having taken a wicket with the first ball of the innings, Davidson proceeded to bowl both Barry Shepherd and John Parker before Russell Waugh was caught by Norm O'Neill in the first innings. He ended with 5/40 and took 2/32 in the second innings as the visitors completed an innings victory.

In the Second Test at Melbourne, Davidson made 40 in Australia's first innings of 316. and then captured 6/75 to restrict England's lead to 15. Australia then 248 with Davidson contributing 17, but he went wicketless in the second innings as England successfully reached their target with seven wickets in hand to take a 1–0 series lead. Australia's victory in the Third Test at Sydney, was Davidson's first Test victory on his home ground, and he made a major contribution with bowling figures of 4/54 and 5/25; the latter effort included the wickets of Pullar, Sheppard and Dexter to precipitate a collapse that saw England all out for 104. This left Australia with a victory target of only 65, which was reached just before the beginning of a heavy thunderstorm that would have caused the remainder of the match to be abandoned, thus saving England from defeat.

Davidson struck 46 runs in the first innings of the Fourth Test in Adelaide, then tore his hamstring muscle after bowling only 3.4 overs. Australia, with a bowler short, was unable to force a win without him. The Fifth Test was on his home ground at Sydney with the series locked 1–1. He captured 3/43 and 3/80, taking a wicket with his final ball in Test cricket when Alan Smith was caught at slip by Bob Simpson. This left Australia with a target of 241 in 60 overs, but there was to be no fairytale finish as the match ended in a draw.

The Ashes series was the only one of seven series that Australia failed to win since Davidson became the team's frontline strike bowler in 1957–58. Of the 33 Tests in this period, Australia won 16, lost four, drew 12 and tied one. Davidson missed one of the drawn games through injury and broke down mid-match in another two. In the five years that he and Benaud led Australia's bowling attack, the pair totalled 333 wickets; Davidson 170 at 19.25 and Benaud 163 at 25, and were a major part in Australia's return to the forefront of world cricket. This came after the first four years of Davidson's career saw Australia win none and lose seven matches out of twelve. Often bowling in tandem, Davidson's accuracy also forced opposition batsmen to attack Benaud, leading them to perish from the pressure to raise the run rate. In the four years after Davidson retired, Australia struggled without his wicket-taking ability. Only one of the six series was won and two were lost; in all Australia managed six wins and eight losses in 30 Tests. Davidson was at his best when Australia was on her knees; In the four Test losses during the last five years of his career, he took 32 wickets at an average of just 13.9 including a ten wicket haul. In the Tied Test, he took eleven wickets, the other ten wicket haul in his Test career.

== After cricket ==
In Sydney Grade Cricket, he scored 4,302 runs at 37.08 and took 348 wickets at 13.69. He later served as a selector for the Australian team from 1979 to 1984, and after serving as a vice president for three years, in 1970 became president of the New South Wales Cricket Association. At the age of 41, he was the youngest person to have held the post. Davidson held the post until 2003. Davidson was one of the trustees of the SCG from 1978 to 1998, during which time floodlights were installed at the ground.

Davidson held positions on the board of directors of a variety of organisations, sporting, medical, philanthropic and corporate. He was the chairman of Freshfood Australia Holdings, and was the president of Surf Life Saving Australia from 1984 to 2002. He served as a member of the New South Wales Sport Advisory Council from 1988 to 2008, and the national equivalent from 1977 to 1981, and served as a director of the ANZAC Health and Research Foundation from 1994 to 2003. He held positions with the Australian Red Cross and Legacy Australia. Davidson also worked as a teller for the Commonwealth Bank from 1947 to 1974.

Davidson also served as the chairman of the Rothmans National Sports Foundation for six years. He served on the New South Wales Olympic Council from 1980 to 1996. He published his autobiography Fifteen Paces in 1963, a reference to the length of his bowling run.

A suburban cricket and Australian rules football ground in Alexandria, in Sydney's inner-west, is named after Davidson. There is also a suburban cricket and soccer oval in Wyoming, New South Wales, on the Central Coast that is named after Davidson, as well as a cricket and rugby field located in Homebush.

In 2013 Davidson appeared in a television commercial for his former employer, the Commonwealth Bank. Davidson appears as an aged dog walker watching a young boy practise his bowling.

== Personal life ==
Davidson married Betty Patricia McKinley in 1952. Their sons were born in 1953 and 1955 while he was on tour in England and the West Indies respectively. He was named as the New South Wales Father of the Year in 1982. Davidson died in Sydney on 30 October 2021, aged 92.

== Honours ==
Davidson was named as one of the five Wisden Cricketers of the Year in 1962. He was made a Member of the order of the British Empire (MBE) in 1964 and a Member of the Order of Australia (AM) in 1987. He was inducted into the Sport Australia Hall of Fame in 1988, the Australian Cricket Hall of Fame in 2004, and the ICC Hall of Fame in 2011. He received an Australian Sports Medal in 2000.

== Test match performance ==
Key: * – not out

| | | Batting | | | | Bowling | | | |
| Opposition | Matches | Runs | Average | High score | 100 / 50 | Runs | Wickets | Average | Best (inns) |
|---|---|---|---|---|---|---|---|---|---|
| England | 25 | 750 | 24.19 | 77* | 0/3 | 1996 | 84 | 23.76 | 6/64 |
| India | 6 | 109 | 18.16 | 41 | 0/0 | 473 | 30 | 15.76 | 7/93 |
| Pakistan | 4 | 130 | 32.50 | 47 | 0/0 | 313 | 14 | 22.35 | 4/42 |
| South Africa | 5 | 127 | 21.16 | 62 | 0/1 | 425 | 25 | 27.00 | 6/34 |
| West Indies | 4 | 212 | 30.28 | 80 | 0/1 | 612 | 33 | 18.54 | 6/53 |
| Overall | 44 | 1328 | 24.59 | 80 | 0/5 | 3819 | 186 | 20.53 | 7/93 |
