= Ken Mackay =

Australian cricketer (1925–1982)

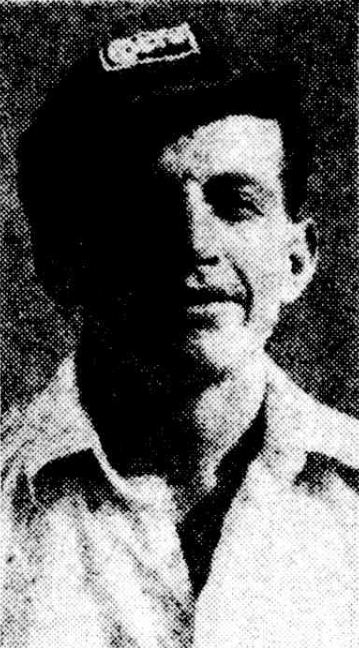
- Mackay in 1948

Personal information
- Full name: Kenneth Donald Mackay
- Born: 24 October 1925; Windsor, Queensland, Australia
- Died: 13 June 1982 (aged 56); Point Lookout, Queensland, Australia
- Batting: Left-handed
- Bowling: Right-arm medium
- Role: Batsman

International information
- National side: Australia
- Test debut (cap 203): 21 June 1956 v England
- Last Test: 25 January 1963 v England

Career statistics
Competition	Test	First-class
Matches	37	201
Runs scored	1,507	10,823
Batting average	33.48	43.64
100s/50s	0/13	23/59
Top score	89	223
Balls bowled	5,792	24,744
Wickets	50	251
Bowling average	34.42	33.31
5 wickets in innings	2	7
10 wickets in match	0	0
Best bowling	6/42	6/42
Catches/stumpings	16/–	84/–
- Source: CricInfo, 23 November 2020

Kenneth Donald "Slasher" Mackay (24 October 1925 – 13 June 1982) was an Australian cricketer who played in 37 Test matches between 1956 and 1963.

He was universally known as "Slasher", an ironic reference to his often back-to-the-wall batting style, which was bestowed upon him by Toombul District Cricket Club teammate, Aub Carrigan. In his first Test at Lord's in 1956, he batted for over four hours in each inning, wearing down the England bowlers with pawky defence and unbreakable concentration. He matured as a Test player to become an unobtrusive but an often vital member of Richie Benaud's team, that brought Australia out of its late-fifties doldrums in two remarkable series, against the West Indies in 1960–61 and England in 1961. Mackay made important contributions in both, most notably his famous last-wicket stand with Lindsay Kline in the 4th Test against the West Indies in Adelaide which forced a remarkable draw.

Mackay teamed with Benaud and Alan Davidson to provide a high-quality, flexible core of all-rounders that often proved the difference for Australia in tight situations. While lacking the talent of the fast left-arm swing of Davidson and the leg-spin of Benaud, his economical, nagging right-arm medium pace was often strategically useful and occasionally, especially in Pakistan and India, destructive. He was the second-most economic of significant Australian test bowlers, surpassed in miserliness only by Arthur Mailey. He was not a tidy-looking bowler and he shambled up to the wicket, but in the 1961 Ashes series he was Australia's first-change bowler and in the First Test dismissed Ken Barrington, M.J.K. Smith and Raman Subba Row in four balls to give Australia a 321-run first innings lead.

A prolific run-scorer at first-class level, he was more of a bit-part player than a front-line batsman, but averaged healthily for an all-rounder and for many years had the distinction, until passed by Shane Warne (who played many more Tests), of scoring the most Test runs of any Australian without scoring a century. Many of his 13 Test half-centuries were made in crucial situations, often batting with the tail. His final Test series was the 1962-63 Ashes series, when he made 86 not out at such a dull rate that he was dropped due to public demand, but was recalled for the Fourth Test. With Alan Davidson injured he took 3/80 and 1/13, but made only 1 and 3 and was dropped again.

Always highly regarded by teammates and opponents, his popularity with the public grew remarkably late in his career, especially after his Adelaide heroics. A testimonial (Mackay, like most Australian cricketers of the time, was an amateur) with the slogan 'A Bob in for The Slasher' raised the then substantial sum of five thousand pounds, and a street and the main oval at Toombul District Cricket Club were named in his honour. His autobiography, Slasher Opens Up, is regarded as one of the very best cricketer's books, as much for its humour and honesty as for its heroics. Mackay died early in 1982 but, as Jack Pollard wrote in his definitive 'Australian Cricket, the Game and the Players', "while cricket is played in Australia, he will be fondly remembered".

== Biography ==
Mackay was born in Northgate, Brisbane, eldest child of Queensland-born parents Alexander Mackay, ironworker (a winner of the Military Medal in World War One), and his wife Lillie Elizabeth. He was a schoolboy prodigy as a cricketer. Mackay left school at age 14 and began playing grade cricket at age 15 for Toombul.

Mackay enlisted in the Australian Imperial Force on 6 November 1943, serving in New Britain the 22nd Battalion. He was discharged on 13 December 1946.

Mackay made his first class debut for Queensland in December 1946 against the touring English side, scoring 13 and 33.

Mackay became one of Queensland's most consistent batters. In 1952-53 he made 507 runs at 39. The following summer he scored 723 runs at 72.30 and was discussed as a test prospect with observers such as Lindsay Hassett praising his defence and concentration. In 1954-55 he made 352 runs at 50.28. However he was overlooked for selection for Australia that summer, the selectors preferring players such as Ron Archer, Les Favell and Graeme Hole. He became captain of Queensland in 1954-55.

=== 1956 Ashes ===
Mackay's continued excellence over the 1955-56 domestic season - 872 runs at 62.28 including 203 against New South Wales - saw him selected on the 1956 Ashes squad.

Mackay made his Test début at Lord's, batting for more than seven hours, scoring 38 (off 160 minutes) and 31 (off 264 minutes). He also took a wicket. These contributions proved invaluable in what would be Australia's sole test victory. His batting was criticised by Herb Sutcliffe.

In the next test Mackay made 2 and 2, being dismissed by Laker both times. In the 4th test he made 0 and 0, again falling to Laker twice. Laker later called Mackay his "bunny". Mackay was dropped for the last Test at The Oval, replaced by Alan Davidson.

Mackay was recalled to the test team to play against India. In the first test he made 29. In the second he scored 26 but took 3-27 in India's first innings. In the third test Mackay made 5 and 27.

During the 1956-57 domestic season, Mackay was in excellent form, making 821 runs at 74.63. Queensland only narrowly missed winning the Sheffield Shield. Mackay originally missed out on selection on the 1957 squad to tour South Africa but was picked as a last minute replacement when Ron Archer fell injured. Mackay had a successful tour and was established as a regular in the Australian side over the next few years.

In the first test Mackay took 2-54 in South Africa's first innings, and made 3 when Australia first batted. However his second innings of 65 off 257 balls was crucial in helping Australia escape with a draw. Mackay made useful contributions in the second test, making 63 off 213 balls in the first innings to prevent an Australian collapose. In the third test Mackay made 32 off 151 balls in the first innings (Australia's second highest score) and 52 off 215 balls in the second, saving Australia again. In the fourth test Mackay made 83 off 234 balls. In the fifth test he scored 77 off 191 helping once more stopping Australian batting from collapsing.

Mackay played in every test of the 1958-59 Ashes. It was a relatively quiet series for Mackay although in the third test he made 57 off 154 balls. Alan Davidson later played tribute for Mackay allowing himself to be run out while batting with Norman O'Neill rather than O'Neill, saying this was indicative of Mackay's unselfishness.

=== 1959 tour of India and Pakistan ===
Mackay was picked on the Australian team to tour India and Pakistan in 1959-60, playing all three tests against Pakistan and five against India. In the first test against Pakistan, Mackay took 6-42 helping bowl Australia to victory. AAP wrote "He bowled" with great accuracy, keeping the ball well up to the batsmen to make them play at nearly every ball, and he varied the pace and turn enough to keep them guessing." Richie Benaud later said "Ken Mackay was superb in Pakistan: not unplayable but very accurate, and the movement either way off the seam on the mat was one of the prime reasons we were the only team ever to beat Pakistan on matting."

In the first test against India Mackay scored 78 but he made a pair in the second test. In the 4th test he scored 89 his best test score; Benaud called the innings "splendid". Mackay played in the 5th test even though he was ill as several Australian players were unwell.

Mackay played every test of the 1960-61 series against the West Indies. In the second test he top scored in Australia's first innings with 74. In the third test he made 39 off 155 balls but scored a duck in the second innings. The fourth test saw Mackay at the wicket when Australia was 9-207 with 250 to win and one hour and fifty minutes to play. He and Linsday Kline managed to hang on for a draw, with Mackay making 62 off 223 balls. These efforts prompted the Courtier Mail newspaper to run a "bob in for Slasher" campaign as a testimonial.

Mackay toured England for the 1961 Ashes. He had an excellent first test, taking five wickets and scoring 64. He almost bowled Australia to victory in the 5th test, taking 5-121. He scored 168 in a game against Kent.

In the 1962-63 Ashes Mackay made 86 in the first test. He scored 105 between lunch and tea for Queensland against England. His form fell away and while he was picked for the fifth and last test he was made 12th man. According to Benaud, the selectors "quite deliberately chose him in the twelve for the final Test in Sydney, knowing they were to make him drinks waiter on the morning of the match... They knew they were probably about to end Mackay’s Test career and they cared." Beanud said Neil Harvey and Alan Davidson were retiring at the end of the Ashes and the selectors thought "it would be nice for him to go out at the same time as Harvey and Davidson, rather than be in Perth playing in a Sheffield Shield game."

He scored 49 off 25 minutes for the Prime Ministers XI against England.

Mackay was unable to force his way back into the Australian team over the 1963-64 summer. He only scored 243 first class runs at 24.30 with a top score of 59 but took 26 wickets at 38. In December 1963 Mackay wrote a letter to the board saying he was not available for selection on the 1964 tour of England. Mackay's last appearance for Queensland was against Victoria in 1964.

=== Post cricket career ===
Mackay was Queensland selector for fifteen years. In 1977 he was appointed state coach for Queensland and the team only narrowly missed winning the Shield in 1977-78.

Mackay was an insurance agent although he later called that just "a job to raise a few bob to raise four kids. I've forsaken everything for the game since I was five."

Mackay tried several times unsuccessfully to be an Australian selector, being defeated at the ballot in 1964, 1971 and 1977.

== Personal life ==
Mackay suffered a heart attack in December 1980 while watching a Shield game. "They had me in an oxygen mask but I was still asking for scores," he said.

Mackay died of another heart attack in 1982, two weeks after the death of his wife Jean (married 4 August 1951). He was survived by four daughters.

== Appraisal ==
Bill O'Reilly called him "the most unselfish cricketer the game has seen and his death... robs Australian cricket of one of its most respected personalities... No man was a better judge of a ball which could be allowed to pass harmlessly by... With the ball he had an uncanny knack of snaring a prized wicket at the appropriate occasion." Alan Davidson called him "a stouthearted, loyal and faithful servant to Australian cricket... a most unselfish player." Richie Benaud wrote, "Mackay was a number of things to me: he was a good tough cricketer, and in all the years I played and watched the game, he remained one of the finest of men and proudest Australians ever to walk on to a cricket field"

Trevor Bailey called Mackay:

The most efficient blunter of pace bowling in Australia. Few have possessed better judgement of what to play and what to leave alone. His watchful defence repeatedly held his side together from the middle of the order. Although he experienced problems on an English pitch, and was almost unbelievably bad against the Surrey twins, Laker and Lock, in England, his overall value to Australia was considerable and rather more than statistics suggest. Slasher also bowled a nagging medium pace which would have caused little trouble in the 1930s and 1940s, but made him a very useful support seamer on pitches and outfields that were becoming increasingly greener.

== Awards ==
He was appointed a Member of the Order of the British Empire for his services to cricket in 1962.

== Notes ==
- Benaud, Richie (2015). Remembering Richie. Hodder Headline.
