= Norm O'Neill =

Australian cricketer

Norm O'Neill OAM
- O'Neill pictured in the early 1960s

Personal information
- Full name: Norman Clifford Louis O'Neill
- Born: 19 February 1937; Carlton, New South Wales, Australia
- Died: 3 March 2008 (aged 71); Erina, New South Wales, Australia
- Batting: Right-handed
- Bowling: Right-arm leg spin
- Role: Batsman

International information
- National side: Australia
- Test debut (cap 211): 5 December 1958 v England
- Last Test: 5 May 1965 v West Indies

Domestic team information
- Years: Team
- 1955–1967: New South Wales

Career statistics
Competition	Tests	FC
Matches	42	188
Runs scored	2,779	13,859
Batting average	45.55	50.95
100s/50s	6/15	45/63
Top score	181	284
Balls bowled	1,392	7,131
Wickets	17	99
Bowling average	39.23	41.01
5 wickets in innings	0	0
10 wickets in match	0	0
Best bowling	4/41	4/40
Catches/stumpings	21/0	104/0
- Source: ESPNCricinfo, 3 March 2008

Norman Clifford Louis O'Neill OAM (19 February 1937 – 3 March 2008) was a cricketer who played for New South Wales and Australia. A right-handed batsman known for his back foot strokeplay, O'Neill made his state debut aged 18, before progressing to Test selection aged 21 in late 1958. Early in his career, O'Neill was one of the foremost batsmen in the Australian team, scoring three Test centuries and topping the run-scoring aggregates on a 1959–60 tour of the Indian subcontinent which helped Australia win its last Test and series on Pakistani soil for 39 years, as well as another series in India. His career peaked in 1960–61 when he scored 181 in the tied Test against the West Indies, and at the end of the series, had a career average of 58.25.

O'Neill's performances on the 1961 tour of England saw him named as one of the Wisden Cricketers of the Year. Thereafter his form was less formidable, characterised by nervousness and fidgeting at the start of his innings. Persistent knee problems, as well as a controversial media attack on the legality of West Indian bowler Charlie Griffith, saw him dropped from the Australian team after 1965. O'Neill also bowled occasional leg spin and was regarded as one of the finest fielders of his era. He later became a cricket commentator. His son Mark O'Neill also played cricket at state level.

He was inducted into the Australian Hall of Fame by Cricket Australia in 2018.

== Early years ==
The son of a builder, O'Neill was born in Carlton, a suburb of Sydney, New South Wales. He had no cricketing associations on his father's side of the family, but his maternal uncle, Ron Campion, played for the Glebe club in Sydney Grade Cricket. Campion trained for cricket near the O'Neill family home, at Bexley Oval. O'Neill accompanied his uncle to cricket from the age of seven and was given batting practice at the end of each session. At Bexley Primary school, O'Neill was denied a chance to play cricket as the school did not field a team. Moving on to Kogarah Intermediate High School, O'Neill played cricket in defiance of a teacher who recommended that he take up athletics. As a teenager, O'Neill idolised Keith Miller after his uncle took him to the Sydney Cricket Ground: O'Neill saw Miller play that day and was impressed with the way he hit the ball off the back foot.

Under his uncle's guidance, O'Neill joined the St George Cricket Club, in the Sydney Grade competition. He steadily moved up through the grades and broke into the first grade side at the age of 16. Sensing his potential, the club's selectors informed him that regardless of form, he would play the full season, which allowed him to be uninhibited in his batting. He made 108 in seven innings. The next season, he was out 12 times leg before wicket in 15 innings, and run out in the other three. O'Neill attributed his failures to over-aggressiveness and resolved to improve his patience. In the second match of the new season, the 17-year-old O'Neill made his first century. With all five state selectors onlooking, he made 28 in the next match and was called into the state squad.

== Shield debut ==
O'Neill made his debut for New South Wales at the age of 18 against South Australia during the 1955–56 season. His lack of contribution was highlighted against the backdrop of his team's crushing innings victory: O'Neill failed to score a run or take a wicket. New South Wales bowled first and had South Australia at 6/49 when Miller introduced O'Neill's occasional leg spin, presumably to ease the debutant's nerves by bringing him into the game. The home team struck 18 from three overs. O'Neill was listed to bat in the lower middle order but after the top order had made a big start, Miller brought O'Neill up. He came in against the second new ball and was clean bowled. O'Neill was dropped and did not play another match for the season, but had gained invaluable experience.

O'Neill steadily rose in the 1956–57 season. At the start of the season, with many players still on international duty during the closing stages of the tour to England and the subsequent stopover in the Indian subcontinent, O'Neill was recalled and made 60 and 63 not out against Queensland at the start of the season. This saw him retain his place when the Test players returned. After making a pair of single-figures scored, he made a sequence of three 60s against South Australia, Victoria and Western Australia, He was rewarded with selection in the one-off match between Ray Lindwall's XI and Neil Harvey's XI, which doubled as a national selection trial, before making his first ton (127) against South Australia. He ended the season with 567 runs at 43.61, and earned selection for a non-Test tour of New Zealand under Ian Craig, in a team composed mainly of young players. He made 102 not out in the only "Test" match that he played, helping to set up a ten-wicket win. heading the tour averages with 218 runs at 72.66. Despite this, he was overlooked for the 1957–58 Test tour of South Africa. It was regarded as one of the most controversial decisions of the decade.

O'Neill responded during the 1957–58 Sheffield Shield season weakened by the absence of the Test players, aggregating 1,005 runs at 83.75 and taking 26 wickets at 20.42 with his leg spinners, thus topping the national bowling and batting averages. Prior to the season, he had never taken a first-class wicket. In the opening match of the summer, he took 3/74 against Queensland. He then took a total of 5/51 scored 33 and 48 not out in a six-wicket win over Western Australia before taking 3/52 and adding two fifties in the return match. He then broke through for his first century of the season, scoring 114 and taking 3/44 in a ten-wicket win over South Australia. However, he reached more productive levels in the second half of the season.

This comprised 175 against Victoria, 74 and 48 against Queensland, 125 and 23* against South Australia and 233 against Victoria. His 233 was made in little over four hours and featured 38 fours. It was the first time that a New South Welshman (let alone a twenty-year-old) had scored 1,000 in a Shield season. Bradman and Bill Ponsford were the only others before him. He added 12 wickets in the final four matches, including 2/50 and 4/40 in the match against Queensland. O'Neill's performances played a large part in his state's fifth consecutive title.

These performances led former Test leg spinner Bill O'Reilly to compare him to Bradman and former Test opening batsman Jack Fingleton to lament his non-selection for the South African tour and its reflection on the plight of Australian cricket.

At the time, his employers refused to make allowances for him to play sport, forcing him to begin work at six in the morning. As a result, he considered moving to South Australia, where a grocery magnate offered him employment and financial incentives. However, he stayed after state officials intervened, with Sir Ronald Irish, the Australian chairman of Rothmans, providing him with a job in Sydney. At the time, O'Neill had another offer. Having represented his state in baseball and been nominated in the All-Australian team in 1957, he was approached by the New York Yankees, having had experience at a pitcher and short stop. O'Neill was offered a fee more than 25 times that for a single Test match, as well as travel costs and accommodation, to trial with the Yankees. He agreed, but Irish dissuaded him less than a week before his scheduled departure.

== Test debut ==
Identified as a future Test prospect, he was selected in a Western Australia Combined XI for a match against the touring England cricket team at the start of the 1958–59 season in Perth. Prior to the match, O'Neill was hounded by the media. The tourists decided to test him with short-pitched bowling, especially Fred Trueman. O'Neill decided to abstain from hooking, while attacking the spin of Jim Laker with a series of sweep shots. After four and a half hours of uncharacteristic restraint, he compiled 104 with an emphasis on off side play. He took a total of 2/67, removing Fred Trueman and Arthur Milton.

He scored 85 against Western Australia and then made 84 not out for New South Wales against England. He was selected for an Australian XI, which played the tourists in a dress rehearsal before the Tests. He made one and two as Australia were crushed by 345 runs.

Nevertheless, O'Neill was selected to make his debut in the five-Test series against England, playing in all of the matches. The First Test in Brisbane was a low scoring match described by Australian captain Richie Benaud as producing "some of the slowest and worst cricket imaginable", O'Neill made 34 in Australia's first innings of 186 to help secure a lead of 52. He then top-scored with an unbeaten 71 in the second innings, guiding Australia to an eight-wicket victory. O'Neill scored 71 of the last 89 runs scored while he was at the crease, refusing to be dried up by the England's usage of leg theory. It enlivened a match plagued by time-wasting, and best remembered for a depressingly slow innings by England's Trevor Bailey, who scored 68 from 426 balls in seven and a half hours. England captain Peter May described O'Neill's innings as "sparkling" and said that it made "everything which had gone before look even more wretched". Retired English player Ian Peebles, writing in the Sunday Times, said "Although O'Neill is in the very early stages of his career, it is already something of an occasion when he comes to the wicket, and one can sense the expectancy of the crowd and the heightened tension of the opposition". Wisden opined that O'Neill had "saved a game that had been tortuous for days". For his part, O'Neill said that the dour play was "unbelievable" and that he was "just about falling to sleep" in the field.

He struck 77 in the rain-affected drawn Third Test at the Sydney Cricket Ground and followed this with 56 in the Fourth Test in Adelaide. Despite making a duck in the Fifth Test, he ended the series as the second highest runscorer with 282 at 56.40 as Australia took the series 4–0. He bowled two overs without success. Outside the Tests, O'Neill scored 155 and 128 against Victoria and Western Australia respectively as New South Wales completed their sixth successive Sheffield Shield win.

== Career peak ==
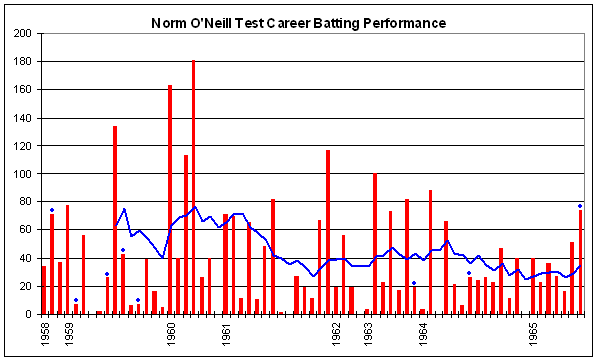
O'Neill's Test career batting performance. The red bars indicate the runs that he scored in an innings, with the blue line indicating the batting average in his last ten innings. The blue dots indicate an innings where he remained not out.

The following season O'Neill was Australia's leading batsman during the 1959–60 tour to Pakistan and India, where he was a part of the last Australian team to win a Test on Pakistani soil for 39 years. After a quiet match in the First Test eight-wicket win in Dacca in East Pakistan (now Bangladesh), in which he scored two and 26 not out, O'Neill played a key role in the victory in the Second Test in Lahore that was to Australia's last in Pakistan until 1998. O'Neill made his maiden Test century of 134 in the first innings to give Australia a 245-run lead. He then took his maiden Test wicket in Pakistan's second innings, that of Shujauddin. This left Australia chasing a target of 122 in the last two hours on the final day. The chase was on schedule with O'Neill partnering Neil Harvey when the Pakistanis began wasting time to prevent an Australian victory. This was implemented by swapping fielders very slowly when the left and right-handed combination of Harvey and O'Neill took a single, and overs began taking seven minutes instead of three. To counter this, Harvey deliberately backed away when a ball was aimed at the stumps and threw away his wicket by letting himself be bowled for 37. This allowed Benaud to come in and bat with O'Neill so that the two right-handed batsmen would give no opportunity to waste time by switching the field. Benaud then threatened Pakistani captain Imtiaz Ahmed with a formal complaint over the time-wasting, and proceedings returned to their normal pace. Australia made the target with a few minutes to spare, with O'Neill on 43. O'Neill failed to make double figures in the final Test, which was drawn, but ended the series with 218 runs at 72.66. In another tour match, against the President's XI, O'Neill scored an unbeaten 52 in a low-scoring match as Australia stumbled to their target of 116 with only three wickets in hand.

O'Neill's performances in Pakistan was such that the parents in one cricket-following Karachi family named their new son Anil for its resemblance to O'Neill. Anil Dalpat went on to become the first Hindu to represent Pakistan, playing nine Tests in the 1980s as a wicketkeeper.

On the five-Test Indian series which followed, O'Neill started slowly, aggregating 60 runs in the first two Tests, which were shared 1–1. He returned to form with a leg-side dominated 163 in a high-scoring draw in the Third Test at Brabourne Stadium in Bombay. After scoring 40 in an innings victory in the Fourth Test in Madras, Australia needed a draw in the Fifth Test in Calcutta with four players injured or ill, while Benaud had a dislocated spinning finger. O'Neill scored 113 in the first innings to help a depleted team take a 137-run first innings lead and prevent India from squaring the series. He was Australia's leading scorer in the Tests, with 376 runs at 62.66. He also made his highest first-class score of 284, against an Indian President's XI in Ahmedabad. He was the top scorer for the whole subcontinental Test tour, with 594 runs in eight matches at 66.00.

He returned to Australia and played in one match for New South Wales at the end of the 1959–60 season, scoring 175 as his state defeated Western Australia and won a seventh Shield in a row. Prior to the following Australian summer, O'Neill was part of an International Cavaliers team that toured South Africa. He scored 133 runs at 21.83.

In the lead-up to the 1960–61 home Tests series against the West Indies, O'Neill scored 156 not to set up an innings win for his state over the tourists. He then struck 181 in the first innings of the opening match at Brisbane, his highest Test score. The innings prompted teammate Bob Simpson to say "if God gave me an hour to watch someone I'd seen, I'd request to see Norman O'Neill. He had the style." Australia took a first innings lead and O'Neill made 26 in the second innings as Australia collapsed towards a likely defeat before recovering; the match ended in the first Tied Test in history. This was the peak of O'Neill's career. Having played 14 Tests, he was averaging 67.68 with the bat.

He then struck 114 as his state defeated the tourists by an innings, and he made 40 and a duck as the Australians took the series lead in the Second Test. He made 70 and 71 in the Third Test loss in Sydney, one of the few players able to combat Lance Gibbs effectively, top-scoring in the first innings and second top-scoring in the second innings. He then made 65 in the second innings in the Fourth Test at Adelaide, where Australia held on by one wicket for a draw. He contributed 48 in the second innings of the Fifth Test as Australia appeared headed for a series victory. However, a late collapse ensued, and Australia scraped home by two wickets to take the series 2–1. O'Neill ended the series with 522 runs at 52.20. O'Neill gained attention during the summer for frequently losing his wicket by impulsively sweeping. This was attributed to the dominance of his bottom hand, which saw his bat swinging across the line of flight of the ball. Despite the criticism, he was at the peak of his international career, having made 1398 runs at 58.35 in his first 18 Tests.

== Wisden Cricketer of the Year ==
O'Neill was selected for the tour of England in 1961, and he warmed up by scoring centuries in consecutive matches against Tasmania for the Australian squad. During the English summer, O'Neill scored 1981 runs at 60.03, narrowly missing becoming only the fourth post-war player after Don Bradman, Neil Harvey and Bill Lawry to make 2,000 runs in an Ashes tour.

In the third match against Yorkshire, which was O'Neill's second for the tour, he scored an unbeaten 100 marked by his cover driving. He followed this with a 74 against Lancashire before a 124 two matches later against Glamorgan, which was described by Wisden as the best of the season. He scored 73 against Gloucestershire and made 122 on his first appearance at Lord's, against the Marylebone Cricket Club, in what was effectively a dress rehearsal for the Tests. Australia went on to win by 63 runs. In the next match against Sussex, O'Neill was carried from the ground after suffering a knee injury, and after failing to bat in either innings, it appeared he would be sidelined for a substantial period.

However, he recovered to be selected for the First Test at Edgbaston, just five days later. He made 82 as Australia scored 9/516 declared and took a 321-run first innings lead, but England could not be dismissed in the second innings and salvaged a draw. He continued his form with an unbeaten 104 against Kent between the Tests.

The "Battle of the Ridge" in the Second Test at Lord's—the home of cricket—was an unhappy one for O'Neill. On an erratic pitch with a visible ridge that caused uneven bounce, O'Neill made one and a duck as an Australia scraped home by five wickets in a low-scoring match.

He returned to the county matches and scored 162 against Lancashire, before scoring 27 and 19 as England squared the series in the Third Test at Headingley. O'Neill then scored 142 against Northamptonshire, but the hosts were able to tie the scores when stumps were drawn with four wickets in hand.

After rectifying a technical fault, O'Neill made 67 in the second innings of the Fourth Test at Old Trafford with the series tied at 1–1, helping Australia take a narrow victory to retain the Ashes. Heading into the final Test, O'Neill had a consistent run, scoring three fifties in four innings. He made his first century against England in the Fifth Test at The Oval with 117 as Australia drew the match to take the series. He did so after being given a "lucky coin" by a spectator and being dropped at second slip when he was on 19. He scored 324 runs at 40.50 in the Tests and was subsequently named as one of the five Wisden Cricketers of the Year for 1962. Following the Tests, O'Neill added four half-centuries in five innings in a consistent run towards the close of the tour. He left English soil with 138 against Minor Counties, in a non-first-class match. In all first-class matches, he made seven centuries, and his run aggregate was second only to Lawry, who made 2,019 runs.

== International decline ==
After this tour, his form began to decline, as he became prone to uncertain and fidgety starts to his innings, which earned him the nickname "Nervous Norm". A persistent knee injury increasingly troubled him and was to end his career. The 1961–62 Australian team was purely domestic with no touring Test team, and New South Wales completed their ninth Sheffield Shield title in a row, O'Neill had a poor season, scoring only 377 runs at 25.13, passing fifty only twice.

The 1962–63 home Ashes series was Australia's first Test matches in 18 months. After an unproductive season last year, O'Neill started the new summer with 15 and 2/30 for a Western Australia Combined XI against Ted Dexter's Englishmen. His victims with the ball were Dexter and batsman Tom Graveney. He then made his first century in over a year, scoring 131 against Western Australia for his state. O'Neill completed his preparation for the Tests by helping New South Wales to defeat Dexter's men by an innings. He scored 143 and took 2/36, removing Graveney and leading batsman Colin Cowdrey.

O'Neill made 56 in the First Test drawn at Brisbane but failed to pass 20 in the next two matches, which were shared by the two teams. After his wife made him a pair of "lucky lemon socks", he scored 100 in the first innings of the drawn Fourth Test in Adelaide, which turned out to be his last Test century with fifteen Tests before the end of his career. With Alan Davidson injured during the match, O'Neill was required to bowl substantially, conceding 49 runs in what was his most expensive performance to date. He scored 73 in the Fifth Test in Sydney to finish the series with 310 runs at 34.44, substantially below his career average of 53.8 prior to the series. He also took two wickets, one in each of the Third and Fifth Tests, removing Fred Titmus and Dexter respectively. Outside the Tests, O'Neill struggled and passed 25 once in eight other non-Test innings. This was a 93 against arch-rivals Victoria, which was not enough to prevent defeat. Victoria went on to win the Sheffield Shield and end New South Wales' nine-year winning streak.

At the end of the season, he embarked on a tour with the International Cavaliers, which toured Africa, mostly playing against provincial teams. He played in seven matches and had a productive series, scoring 541 runs at 41.54 including a century and four fifties. He also bowled more frequently than usual taking seven wickets at 53.29.

The following season in 1963–64, O'Neill started poorly, passing 12 only once in his first six innings. However, he was retained for the team for the First Test against South Africa in Brisbane, where he scored 82 and 19 not out in a drawn match. He continued his resurgence with 36 and 61 not out the following fixture against Victoria, but was injured during the second innings and forced to retire hurt. This meant that he missed the Second Test, which Australia won by eight wickets. O'Neill returned and scored half centuries in each of the next two Tests. He also took two wickets to end the series with 285 runs at 40.71 and three wickets at 32.33. He added a further two half-centuries in the remaining Shield matches.

O'Neill retained his place for the 1964 tour to England, and scored a century against Western Australia for the touring squad before departing for the northern hemisphere. After failing to pass 16 in his first two outings, he struck form against Glamorgan, scoring 65 and an unbeaten 109. He then added 151 and 17 not out, leading the way as the Australians defeated the MCC by nine wickets in a dress rehearsal for the Tests. However, O'Neill scored 98 in the first four innings of the opening two Tests and was forced out of the Third Test with a knee injury, the only non-draw of the series, which Australia won. Nevertheless, he passed 50 in each of the four tour matches during this period, including a 134 against Yorkshire and 90 against Northamptonshire.

O'Neill returned for the final two Tests and ended the series with only 156 runs at 31.20 in five Tests without passing fifty and going wicketless. He added another century against Kent and two further fifties in the closing stages of the English summer.

His 1964–65 tour of the subcontinent on the way back to Australia was even worse, a far cry from his leading role in the previous tour to the subcontinent. After making 40 and 0 in the First Test win in Madras, he was unable to bat either innings in the Second Test in Bombay after being hospitalised due to persistent vomiting, injury as Australia ceded their series lead. He missed the remainder of the series, the Third Test in Calcutta and a one-off Test in Pakistan. Upon his return home, he has a shortened domestic season before Australia left for the West Indies. In five domestic matches, he scored 357 runs at 59.50, including a 133 not against South Australia.

O'Neill started the 1964–65 tour of the West Indies strongly, scoring a century in the first match against Jamaica. He was often injured during the tour, but was at his most productive with the bat since the last series against the Caribbean team four years earlier. He made many starts, passing 20 in six of his seven Test innings, but was unable to convert them into big scores. In the First Test, O'Neill was struck on the hand by Wes Hall and was sent to hospital for X-rays after a break was suspected. During the Second Test, it was the turn of Charlie Griffith to send O'Neill to hospital, after hitting him on the forearm and causing a large bruise. His 51 and 74* in the Fourth Test at Bridgetown, Barbados, the last Test of his career, was the only time he passed 50 for the series. He ended with 266 runs at 44.33, missing the Fifth Test due to a broken hand. He managed a healthy return with the ball, taking nine of his 17 Test wickets in the series with an average of 25.55. This included his Test best of 4/41 with his leg-spin in the Second Test in Port of Spain, Trinidad. In this match, he cleaned up the hosts' tail in the first innings, removing Jackie Hendriks, Wes Hall, Charlie Griffith and Lance Gibbs.

At the end of the tour, O'Neill garnered controversy by writing outspoken newspaper columns accusing opposition pace spearhead Charlie Griffith of chucking. He was one of several Australians who took exception to Griffith's bowling action, and he put his name to a series of feature articles in Sydney's Daily Mirror. These labelled Griffith as "an obvious chucker", saying the hosts had been "wrong to play" him. O'Neill stated that "If he is allowed to continue throwing, he could kill someone". O'Neill also expressed his desire to not have to face bowling that he deemed to be illegal. When the Daily Mirror syndicated the columns, London's Daily Mail ignored an embargo and printed the pieces while the Australians were on their homeward flight, putting O'Neill in breach of his tour contract, which forbade players from commenting in the media during tours.

The West Indies lodged an official complaint with Australia, and the Australian Cricket Board replied that it deplored the published comments, although noting that as O'Neill's touring contract had expired at the end of the tour, the point was moot. Nevertheless, the ACB changed its stance on players' writing, so that they could no longer comment on a tour until three months after its conclusion. The event is often perceived to have been a factor in O'Neill's eventual departure from the national scene.

Outside the Tests, O'Neill performed strongly in three matches against regional teams, scoring centuries in each of them. He scored 125, 125, and 101 in his only three innings, against Jamaica, Trinidad and Tobago and Barbados.

== Retirement ==
The following season, O'Neill was overlooked for selection in all five Tests against the touring England team. Returning to New South Wales, he scored 473 runs at 39.42, including two centuries.

O'Neill was omitted from the squad that toured South Africa in 1966–67, ending his Test career. He continued his Shield career while his former teammates were on the other side of the Indian Ocean, compiling 741 runs at 74.10 in a strong season. He started the season with 117 against Western Australia, before scoring a pair of 78s in the return match, helping his team to a tense 13-run win. He then scored 128 and 22 not out against Victoria and finished his season with 160 and 80 against South Australia, scoring a majority of his team's first innings score.

As a result, he was selected for an Australian Second XI to tour New Zealand. He scored 69 runs at 17.25 in two international matches and made his last first-class century, scoring 101 and 58 not out against Auckland.

O'Neill retired upon his return to Australia due to a knee injury. He left a reputation as a highly entertaining batsman who did not manage to fulfil his early promise. "A disappointment he was, perhaps, but his cricket will be recalled when those of lesser gifts are forgotten", opined the writer EW Swanton.

In 61 matches for New South Wales, he scored 5419 runs at 52.61. He compiled 3879 runs at 61.57 for St George in grade competition before transferring to Sutherland in the 1965–66 club. He scored 168 on his new club's first day in the competition.

A cigarette salesman by trade, he became a commentator in retirement. He married Gwen Wallace, a track and field athlete who won relay gold for Australia at the 1954 British Empire and Commonwealth Games. They had two sons and a daughter. Their eldest child Mark O'Neill represented New South Wales and Western Australia in the 1980s. O'Neill also co-owned a racehorse with Richie Benaud, Barry Jarman and Ray Steele, named Pall Mallan, and it won a race in 1961.

On 3 March 2008, O'Neill died in Erina, New South Wales, due to the effects of throat cancer. He was 71.

== Style ==
Standing six feet tall, O'Neill was compared to Don Bradman upon his entry into Test cricket. At his best, he was a dynamic stroke maker who was a crowd favourite because of his ability to score at a high pace, in particular with his power off the back foot. He was noted for his nimble footwork, which he used to negate spin bowling; however, this slowed in his later career as he put on weight. O'Neill particularly liked to sweep the slower bowlers. He often put too much emphasis on his right hand, allowing a large space between his hands on the bat handle, and then turning his right shoulder too square towards the bowler. The renowned English batsman and captain Wally Hammond said that O'Neill was the best all-round batsman he had seen since World War II. O'Neill's tall build, strength and good looks also drew comparison to his boyhood idol Keith Miller. Despite the comparisons to Bradman, O'Neill was much taller and broader, and was often impetuous whereas Bradman was known for his patience and lack of rashness. O'Neill was also criticised for hitting across the line early in his innings.

O'Neill was highly regarded for his style and entertainment values. Teammate Alan Davidson said "once set he was the most exhilarating player you'd ever want to see—he was dynamite. He'd play attacking shots off balls other people would only think of defending. He had wonderful skill and technique. His shots off the back foot down the ground off fast bowlers—you can't really describe how good they were." His captain for Australia and New South Wales, Richie Benaud said that he was "one of the greatest entertainers we've had in Australian cricket". O'Neill's style led the British writer EW Swanton to say "the art of batting, he reminded us, was not dead, merely inexplicably dormant". Wisden opined that "A high innings by O'Neill is a thing of masterful beauty. His stroking is delectable, immense in its power."

Later in his career, O'Neill became a nervous and superstitious batsman, particular at the start of an innings. He wrote "batting is a lonely business" in his 1964 autobiography Ins and Outs, opining that he sometimes found first-class cricket to be "depressing and lonely".

He was regarded as an excellent fieldsman at cover, with a powerful and accurate throw, described by Wisden as a "dream throw" honed from a junior career as a baseballer. He was named as utility player in the 1957 All Australian baseball team, and his ability was such that he was approached by Major League Baseball scouts. Before the retirement of Neil Harvey, he and O'Neill fielded in tandem in the covers and the pair were regarded as the finest fielding combination of the time.

== Test match performance ==
		Batting				Bowling			
Opposition	Matches	Runs	Average	High Score	100 / 50	Runs	Wickets	Average	Best (Inns)
England	19	1,072	39.70	117	2/7	176	2	88.00	1/7
India	7	416	52.00	163	2/0	111	1	111.00	1/41
Pakistan	3	218	72.66	134	1/0	41	1	41.00	1/37
South Africa	4	285	40.71	88	0/3	97	3	32.33	1/2
West Indies	9	788	49.25	181	1/5	242	10	24.00	4/41
Overall	42	2,779	45.55	181	6/15	667	17	39.23	4/41
