= Jackie Hendriks =

West Indian cricketer

Personal information
- Full name: John Leslie Hendriks
- Born: 21 December 1933 (age 92); Kingston, Jamaica
- Batting: Right-handed
- Bowling: Right-arm Leg spin, Off spin
- Role: Wicket-keeper

International information
- National side: West Indies
- Test debut: 16 February 1962 v India
- Last Test: 12 June 1969 v England

Domestic team information
- Years: Team
- 1953–54 to 1966–67: Jamaica

Career statistics
Competition	Test	FC	LA
Matches	20	83	3
Runs scored	447	1,568	–
Batting average	18.62	17.42	–
100s/50s	0/2	0/9	–
Top score	64	82	–
Balls bowled	0	52	–
Wickets	–	0	–
Bowling average	–	–	–
5 wickets in innings	–	0	–
10 wickets in match	–	0	–
Best bowling	–	0/0	–
Catches/stumpings	42/5	140/50	0/2
- Source: CricketArchive, 24 January 2009

John Leslie Hendriks (born 21 December 1933) is a former Jamaican cricketer who was a Test wicket-keeper in the West Indies cricket team from 1962 to 1969.

Born in St Andrew, Kingston, Hendriks was educated at Wolmer's Boys' School in Kingston. He played first-class cricket for Jamaica from 1954 to 1967, and captained the team towards the end of his career.

During Australia's tour of the West Indies in 1964–65, he was hit on the head by a delivery from Graham McKenzie, which he needed brain surgery for. After his career as a well-respected player (as a batsman as well as keeping) he moved to cricket management. In 1984 and 1988, he managed tours to England, and during the 1990s, he became a top International Cricket Council referee.

In June 1988, Hendriks was celebrated on the 25c Jamaican stamp alongside the Barbados Cricket Buckle. In July 2010, when he was included in Cricinfo's all-time West Indies XI, it was noted that he earned his place in the team because of his wicket-keeping ability rather than his run-scoring.
