= Conrad Hunte =

Barbadian cricketer

Personal information
- Full name: Sir Conrad Cleophas Hunte
- Born: 9 May 1932; Greenland Plantation, Shorey's Village, St Andrew, Barbados
- Died: 3 December 1999 (aged 67); Sydney, New South Wales, Australia
- Batting: Right-handed
- Bowling: Right-arm medium
- Role: Opening batsman

International information
- National side: West Indies
- Test debut (cap 98): 17 January 1958 v Pakistan
- Last Test: 18 January 1967 v India

Domestic team information
- Years: Team
- 1950/51–1966/67: Barbados

Career statistics
| Competition | Test | FC | LA |
|---|---|---|---|
| Matches | 44 | 132 | 3 |
| Runs scored | 3,245 | 8,916 | 12 |
| Batting average | 45.06 | 43.92 | 4 |
| 100s/50s | 8/13 | 16/51 | 0/0 |
| Top score | 260 | 263 | 11 |
| Balls bowled | 270 | 1,353 | 115 |
| Wickets | 2 | 17 | 6 |
| Bowling average | 55.00 | 37.88 | 10.16 |
| 5 wickets in innings | 0 | 0 | 0 |
| 10 wickets in match | 0 | 0 | 0 |
| Best bowling | 1/17 | 3/5 | 4/38 |
| Catches/stumpings | 16/– | 68/1 | 3/– |
- Source: CricketArchive, 31 July 2011

Sir Conrad Cleophas Hunte, KA (9 May 1932 – 3 December 1999) was a Barbadian cricketer. Hunte played 44 Test matches as an opening batsman for the West Indies.

== Early life and career ==
Hunte was born in rural St Andrew Parish in the north of Barbados, the son of a sugar plantation worker. Hunte's family was poor. One of nine children, Hunte grew up in a one-room house. By the time he was six-years-old, he was playing cricket with the village boys, using an improvised bat made from palm fronds. Hunte's father was determined that Hunte would receive a good education and so Hunte was required to walk—barefoot—each day the three miles to Belleplaine Boys School. Hunte showed the first glimpses of his talent, making the school First XI aged 10 where he played with and against boys much bigger and older than himself.

Hunte, aged 12, won a scholarship to attend Alleyne Secondary School. His talent was soon noted by the school gamesmaster, who placed him straight into the school First XI, where he played against boys aged up to 18. As an incentive the gamesmaster offered Hunte a shilling every time he made 25 runs. Hunte captained the school team in his last three years. In his final year at school Hunte was asked to play for a new club, the Belleplaine Sports and Social Club. Belleplaine played in the Northern section of the Barbados Cricket League (BCL), which provided organised cricket for poor and rural Barbadians. In 1950 Hunte made the BCL representative team for its annual match against the elite (and socially exclusive) Barbados Cricket Association team. Dropped early in his innings by Test player Denis Atkinson, Hunte went on to make 137—the first BCL player to make a century in this annual fixture.

Soon after this match Hunte was selected to make his first-class cricket debut for Barbados against Trinidad and Tobago at Kensington Oval in Bridgetown. Hunte scored 63 runs in the first innings and followed this with 15 in the second. Hunte was also offered a place with the elite Empire Cricket Club in Division 1 of the Barbados Cricket Association, the home club of his sporting idol Everton Weekes. There was little first-class cricket in the West Indies at the time and Hunte's cricket career was slow to progress. He worked for a time as a school teacher at St. Simon's Mixed School, the Barbados civil service as an Accounts Clerk and later in life insurance. Hunte failed to take his opportunity against the visiting Australians in 1954–55, scoring a duck and three. It was the following season when Hunte finally showed his ability on a larger stage, scoring 151 and 95 in two matches against a touring team from England managed by E. W. Swanton.

In 1956 Hunte moved to England, to study Economics and also looking for a professional contract in English league cricket. He worked at a bus plant and cotton mill in Lancashire before being picked up by Leyland Motors Cricket Club in the Northern League. The next year Hunte was contracted by Enfield Cricket Club in the Lancashire League. The relationship between Hunte and Enfield was a happy one; unlike most professionals who tended to wander, Hunte stayed at the club for six seasons. In 1959, Hunte set a club record for the most runs scored in a season.

When Hunte moved to England, he had advised the selectors of the West Indies team that he was available to tour England in 1957 should he be chosen. While waiting for an invitation for the tour, Hunte considered and rejected attempting to become eligible for selection for Kent County Cricket Club in the English County Championship. When no invitation was forthcoming Hunte signed to play with Enfield. Later Hunte was told that the West Indies Cricket Board (WICB) had sent him a letter, which failed to reach him in Lancashire. After he signed with Enfield received a note from a WICB board member, urging him to state if he wished to be considered for selection. Hunte replied that he was, provided Enfield would agree to release him from his contract. When the squad for the tour was released, Hunte's name was missing. The West Indies soon regretted overlooking Hunte. The two batsman selected ahead of him—Nyron Asgarali and Andy Ganteaume—did not meet with much success in the Test matches.

Hunte was only the second West Indian to carry his bat in a Test innings.

== West Indies career ==
Hunte did make his Test debut the following winter against Pakistan at his home ground of Kensington Oval. He hit the first two balls that he faced, from Fazal Mahmood, for fours and made 142 runs in his first innings. In the third Test of the same series he made 260, including a partnership of 446 with Garfield Sobers which was then the second-highest partnership in history and is still the sixth highest – Sobers went on to make a then world-record 365 not out as the West Indies reached 790 for 3 declared. In the fourth Test of the series, Hunte made another century. He finished his debut series with 622 runs at an average of 77.75, and the West Indies won the series 3–1.

After this successful start, Hunte was the West Indies' regular opening batsman for the next nine years, and vice captain of the team for eight of them. This was a successful period for the West Indies, in which they won seven of the ten series in which he played.

Hunte played a major role in West Indies' series win in England in 1963. He curbed his aggressive instincts as a batsman to build a solid platform for the innings. This was rewarded with two crucial centuries. He scored 182 in the first innings of the summer as West Indies won by 10 wickets. Then in the final Test of the summer, the West Indies needed to avoid losing to win the series. They were set 253 to win in the fourth innings, at that time regarded as a difficult target, with over two days to play. But Hunte scored 108 not out as the West Indies won by eight wickets, and won the series 3–1. Hunte finished the series with a batting average of 58.87, and was chosen as one of the Wisden Cricketers of the Year in 1964.

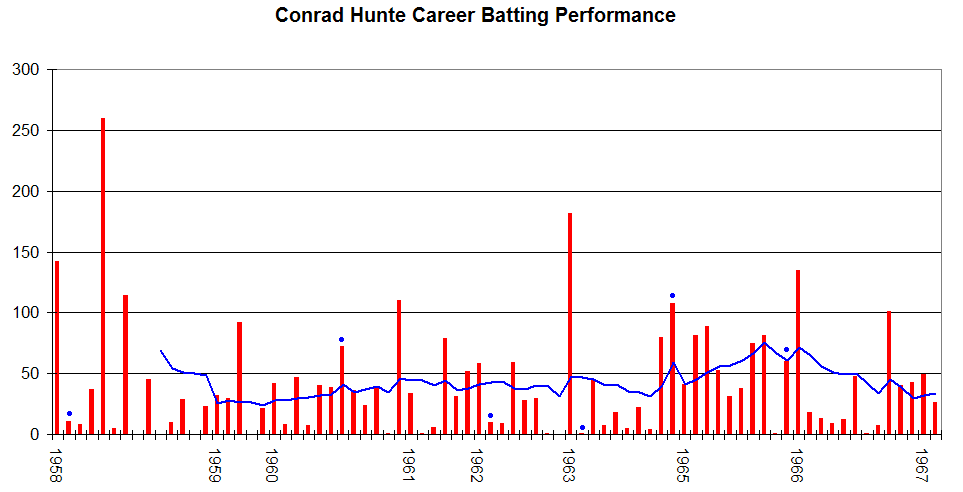
Conrad Hunte's career performance graph.

After the tour to England, the captain of the West Indies, Frank Worrell, retired. Hunte expected to be appointed captain in his place, and when Garfield Sobers was chosen instead, he was bitterly disappointed, and for six weeks considered resigning himself. But he chose to continue playing, and in the next series, against Australia in 1965, he scored 550 runs, although without a century: he scored six fifties in ten innings, with a highest score of 89 and an average of 61.11. This was the record for the highest series aggregate without a century until Mike Atherton scored 553 in a six-Test series against Australia in 1993.

In total, Hunte played in 44 Tests between 1958 and 1967. Despite having 13 different opening partners in his Test career, he accumulated 3245 runs at an average of 45.06. He scored eight centuries, including at least one against every country he played against.

== Life after cricket ==
Hunte was a committed Christian. The defining experience of his life was when in 1961, on the West Indies' tour of Australia, he saw the film The Crowning Experience, about the life of the black American educator Mary McLeod Bethune. This film was promoted by Moral Re-Armament (MRA), a multi-faith organisation promoting absolute moral and ethical standards of behaviour, to which Hunte committed the remainder of his life.

Hunte made no secret of his beliefs. Some reports suggest that the other members of the West Indies team became tired of his constantly expressing them in the dressing room, and that this contributed to his not being awarded the captaincy in 1963.

Hunte retired from cricket in 1967, although he could possibly have continued for some more years, to work full-time for MRA, promoting harmonious race relations. He wrote his autobiography, entitled Playing to Win, in 1971. After several years in Britain, he moved to Atlanta, Georgia, to help with the racial situation there. It was there that he met his wife Patricia, a local newscaster, with whom he had three daughters.

In 1991, as apartheid was coming to an end in South Africa, Hunte rang the director of the new United Cricket Board of South Africa, Ali Bacher, and offered to help develop cricket in the black townships and promote reconciliation between the races. He worked as National Development Coach, funded by the MCC, for seven years. Hunte coached the South Africa women's national cricket team at the 1997 Women's Cricket World Cup in India, its first appearance in the tournament.

In 1998 Hunte was conferred the highest honour in Barbados; he was made a Knight of St. Andrew (KA) of the Order of Barbados. In 1999, with encouragement from the government of Barbados, he returned to the island of his birth. He was elected to the presidency of the Barbados Cricket Association, with plans to revive cricket in the country, but he died two months later, while in Australia to speak at a conference of the MRA.

== Publications ==
- Playing to Win (1971)
