= List of Saurashtra cricketers =

This is a list of cricketers who have played first-class, List A or Twenty20 cricket for Saurashtra cricket team. Seasons given are first and last seasons; the player did not necessarily play in all the intervening seasons. Players in bold have played international cricket.

== B ==
- Mohammad Baluch, 1972/73
- Jenti Bara, 1967/68
- Abhishek Bhat, 2013/14–1014/15
- DS Bhatt, 1962/63
- Prakash Bhatt, 1994/95 – 2004/05
- Bensiyon Songavkar, 2005/06

== G ==
- Jay Gohil, 2022/23

== J ==
- P. Jadeja, 1979/80

== L ==
- Laheji, 1954/55

== N ==
- V.L. Nakum 1945/46 - 1962/63
- Sandil Natkan, 2006/07

== P ==
- Manoj Parmar, 1991/92, 2001/02

== R ==
- Y. Radia

== S ==
- Iqbal Seth, 1959/60
- Rajendra Shah, 1971/76
- Abrar Shaikh, 2016–17

== U ==
- Urmikant Mody, 1965/1966 - 1967/1968

== V ==
- Suresh Vaghjiani, 1963/64
- Vatsal Trivedi, 2005/06

== Z ==
- Harpal Zala, 1955/56
