= International cricket in 1965–66 =

International cricket season

The 1965–66 international cricket season was from September 1965 to April 1966.

== Season overview ==
International tours
Start date	Home team	Away team	Results [Matches]			
Start date	Home team	Away team	Test	ODI	FC	LA
10 December 1965	Australia	England	1–1 [5]	—	—	—
25 February 1966	New Zealand	England	0–0 [3]	—	—	—
5 April 1966	India	Ceylon	—	—	0–0 [1]	—

== December ==
=== England in Australia ===
The Ashes Test series
No.	Date	Home captain	Away captain	Venue	Result
Test 597	10–15 December	Brian Booth	Mike Smith	The Gabba, Brisbane	Match drawn
Test 598	30 Dec–4 January	Bob Simpson	Mike Smith	Melbourne Cricket Ground, Melbourne	Match drawn
Test 599	7–11 January	Brian Booth	Mike Smith	Sydney Cricket Ground, Sydney	England by an innings and 93 runs
Test 600	28 Jan–1 February	Bob Simpson	Mike Smith	Adelaide Oval, Adelaide	Australia an innings and 9 runs
Test 601	11–16 February	Bob Simpson	Mike Smith	Melbourne Cricket Ground, Melbourne	Match drawn

== February ==
=== England in New Zealand ===
Test series
No.	Date	Home captain	Away captain	Venue	Result
Test 602	25 Feb–1 March	Murray Chapple	Mike Smith	AMI Stadium, Christchurch	Match drawn
Test 603	4–8 March	Barry Sinclair	Mike Smith	Carisbrook, Dunedin	Match drawn
Test 604	11–15 March	Barry Sinclair	Mike Smith	Eden Park, Auckland	Match drawn

== April ==
=== Ceylon in India ===
MJ Gopalan Trophy
No.	Date	Home captain	Away captain	Venue	Result
FC Match	5–7 April	Patamada Belliappa	Anura Tennekoon	Kajamalai Stadium, Tiruchi	Match drawn
