= Amar Singh (cricketer) =

Indian cricket player (1910–1940)

Personal information
- Full name: Ladhabhai Nakum Amar Singh
- Born: 4 December 1910; Rajkot, Gujarat, British India
- Died: 21 May 1940 (aged 29); Jamnagar, Gujarat, British India
- Batting: Right-handed
- Bowling: Right-arm fast-medium
- Role: All-rounder
- Relatives: Ladha Ramji (brother)

International information
- National side: India (1932–1936)
- Test debut (cap 1): 25 June 1932 v England
- Last Test: 15 August 1936 v England

Career statistics
Competition	Test	First-class
Matches	7	92
Runs scored	292	3,344
Batting average	22.46	24.23
100s/50s	0/1	5/18
Top score	51	140*
Balls bowled	2,182	23,689
Wickets	28	506
Bowling average	30.64	18.35
5 wickets in innings	2	42
10 wickets in match	0	14
Best bowling	7/86	8/23
Catches/stumpings	3/–	77/–
- Source: ESPNcricinfo, 9 May 2020

Ladhabhai Nakum Amar Singh (4 December 1910 – 21 May 1940) was an Indian Test cricketer. A right-arm fast-medium bowler and effective lower-order batsman, Amar Singh Ladha played in seven Tests for India before World War II. He took 28 wickets in these matches. He was the first Indian Fast bowler and All-rounder, and the first Indian to receive a Test cap. He also scored India's first half-century in Test cricket, in India's first Test.

== Career ==
=== First Class career ===
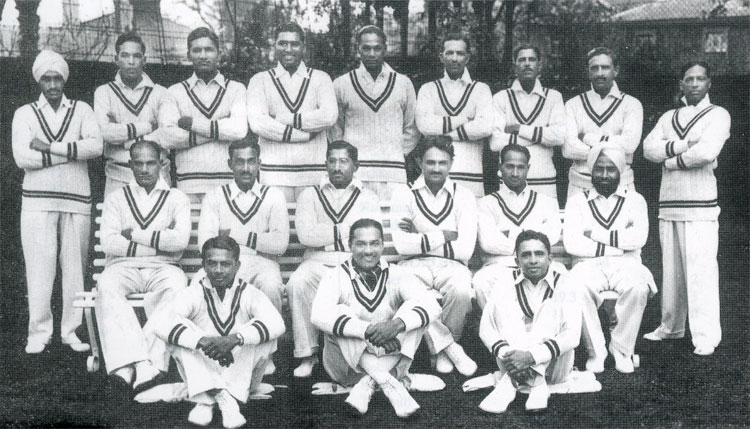
The 1932 Indian Test Cricket team that toured England. Amar Singh seen standing fifth from right on this photo of the team captained by Maharaja of Porbandar.

Amar Singh Ladha played first-class cricket over a nine-year period; in 92 first-class matches he took 508 wickets at the bowling average of 18.35. He also scored five centuries as a batsman. In domestic cricket he was the first Indian to complete the all-rounder's double of 1000 runs and 100 wickets in the Ranji Trophy.

=== International Cricket ===
Against England at Madras in 1933–34, Amar Singh Ladha scored 48 in the second essay after taking 7 for 86 off 44.4 overs in the visitors' first innings total of 335. At Lord's in 1936 he claimed 4/10 in his first nine overs and overall 6 for 35 from his 25.1 overs. In the next Test at Old Trafford he hit 48 not out to save India from an innings defeat. In the unofficial five-Test series against Lord Tennyson's MCC team of 1937–38 he captured 36 wickets at 16.66.

Much to the delight of the Burnley supporters, Amar Singh scored two centuries and six half-centuries. There was a 167 against Rishton, followed by a hard-hitting 112 versus East Lancashire, both at Turf Moore. Amar Singh topped the batting and bowling aggregates as well as averages. In all, he took 101 wickets at 12.11 in 360 overs; and scored 806 runs at 39.38 in 23 innings.

Amar Singh Ladha along with Mohammad Nissar formed part of a duo of fast bowlers for India. Wally Hammond said that he was '"as dangerous an opening bowler as I have ever seen".

In club cricket he played for Colne in the Lancashire League. As the club's first overseas professional he was seen as a rival to Nelson's Learie Constantine and his arrival caused the club's gate receipts and membership to double.

=== Praise from famous cricketers ===
According to English cricket legend Wally Hammond, Amar Singh was "as dangerous an opening bowler as I have ever seen, coming off the pitch like the crack of doom". In an informal press meeting in 1940, Leonard Hutton said that "There is no better bowler in the world today than Amar Singh." Len Hutton said this out of experience as he had played against Singh during his years with Yorkshire. Amar Singh also had an elder brother, Ladha Ramji, an aggressive fast bowler, who played a test for India against England in Bombay. His nephew, VL Nakum, also played first class cricket.

Singh died on the morning of 21 May 1940 from pneumonia at his residence in Jamnagar.

== Test career ==
Amar Singh Ladha was one of the amateurs of the Indian team. With his bowling partner Nissar, the two fast bowlers were the centre of attraction on the first day of the match being played at Lord's. It was first Nissar who wreaked havoc with the English top order, dismissing the openers, Percy Holmes and Herbert Sutcliffe to reduce England 1 for 8 and 2 for 11.

Frank Woolley, was later run out after adding none runs to their score. At 19 for 3, England were in deep trouble, but the legendary Wally Hammond, who would later go on to praise Singh lavishly, mounted a recovery with his Captain Douglas Jardine, the pair added 82 runs for the third wicket before giving Amar Singh his first wicket in test Cricket, later, Nissar carried on his fine work and took three more wickets, cleaning up the middle order, while CK Nayudu (who was the Indian Captain, and who took two for 40 in England's first innings), and Singh mopped up the tail as England were shot out for 259. Amar Singh bowled 31.1 overs, taking 2 for 75.

=== Wisden Report ===
In Wisden's report of the test, it was noted that, "Amar Singh bowled almost as well, making the ball curl in the air either from leg or from the off and causing it to come off the pitch at a tremendous pace." This was highly unexpected as England looked particularly strong on the batting front on paper. India, though, squandered their bowlers good work, and were all out for 189 runs, after they imploded after being 153 for 4. England started their second innings badly as well, losing Sutcliffe, after an opening stand of 30, to Amar Singh. From that point on, Jahangir khan, another Indian fast bowler, ran through England's middle order, taking 4 for 60. Amar Singh bowled for 41 overs, taking 2 for 84. However, Wisden heaped praise on the Indian fast bowler, stating, "When England went in a second time, Amar Singh bowled even better than before". England declared at 275 for 8, with Jardine once again displaying an excellent temperament, scored 85 not out to go with his 79 in the first innings, another innings which was highly received by Wisden and spectators alike, as one particular onlooker's reports, which was retrieved by The Cricketer, praised his gritty innings, stating "Luckily England had in Jardine, the captain, a steel-hearted warrior to hold the pass".

=== Fighting Half century ===
Thus, India, set a target of 346 in the second innings, came out to bat, but were outclassed by England's superior bowling. In fact, Wisden stated in its match reports, that "India fared so badly that they lost seven wickets for 108 ...". However, it was Amar Singh, this time, who displayed his lower-order batting prowess, hitting 51 with the help of one six. He added 74 runs for the eighth wicket with Lall Singh, who scored 29 runs. Ultimately, Amar Singh was the last man out for 187, and India lost by 158 runs.

Amar Singh Ladha played the rest of his six test matches against England, producing several of his best displays, including 4 for 106 in Kolkata in 1934, 6 or 35 at Lord's in 1936, and his career-best figures of 7 for 86 in the Chennai match in 1934. However, he bowled more than thirty-five overs in an innings on six occasions, giving rise to the perception that he was perhaps being used as a workhorse.

== Cricketing style ==
Amar Singh was a tall man; standing at over six feet and two inches, Amar Singh used this height advantage to great effect. He was wiry and broad shouldered. Though not really fast, Amar Singh used his height to extract bounce and movement off the pitch. He was said to have had a clean action, and generated much energy from a run-up of a little more than a dozen yards. This was the reason why English conditions suited him well. Amar Singh was also said to have had the ability to exploit the new ball well, making it swing both the ways, and when the shine was off, his "devastating breakback often penetrated the defense of well set batsmen, castling them comprehensively".

=== Aggressive field setting ===
One reason for Amar Singh's high number of wickets was that he bowled with an aggressive field setting and more importantly, he aimed at the stumps while bowling. His field settings generally consisted of two or three slips, a gully, a cover point, and third man on the off side. On the leg side he usually had a short fine leg, a forward short leg, a silly mid-on and a long leg. He maintained this field against all batsmen.

=== Pinch Hitter of Ball ===
Amar Singh's batting was more or less as much as aggressive as his bowling. He was a pinch-hitter, who was effective on some occasions. Surprisingly, Amar Singh was shifted up the batting order. He was also made to play in the top five positions three times; but, also scored four scores above forty. In the summer of his first test match, Amar Singh hit an unbeaten 131, against Lancashire, coming at no.10, a position from which he had scored his 51 against England in his first test match.

In the light of his bowling performances, another aspect of his game that had been overshadowed along with his batting was Singh's fielding an catching. In 92 first class matches, Singh snaffled 77 catches, and according to Rusi Modi, he was easily as good as Bob Simpson or Wally Hammond in terms of slip catching. However, it is highly debatable whether India's other fielders were as good, as it is reported that many edges of Nissar's and Singh's bowling were dropped.
