= Rajendra Shah =

Rajendra Shah may refer to:

- Rajendra Shah (author) (28 January 1913 – 2 January 2010) was a lyrical poet who wrote in Gujarati.
- Rajendra Shah (cricketer) (1950 – 28 September 2018) was an Indian cricketer.
- Rajendra Shah BP (lyricist)
