= History of cricket in South Africa from 1945–46 to 1970 =

This article describes the history of South African cricket from the end of the Second World War in 1945 to the start of South Africa's cricket isolation in 1970.

International feeling against South Africa's apartheid policy became stronger and more vociferous as the post-war era developed. Until the mid-1960s, however, the South Africa national cricket team continued to play regularly and without undue difficulty against Australia, England and New Zealand.

But matters came to a head in 1968 when the South African government refused to allow a tour by England whose team included Basil D'Oliveira. Although the Australians visited South Africa in 1969–70, the end was nigh for apartheid in sport and South Africa was banned from Test cricket for 22 years. This happened just at a time when the South African team was arguably the strongest in world cricket.

In 1970, after South Africa's tour of England was cancelled, a Rest of the World team toured instead. It was captained by Gary Sobers and included other non-white players from the West Indies, India and Pakistan. It also included four of the greatest South African players (Eddie Barlow, Graeme Pollock, Mike Procter and Barry Richards) who clearly had no problems about sharing a dressing room with other cricketers whose skin was a different colour to their own.

== Domestic cricket from 1945 to 1970 ==
=== Currie Cup winners from 1945-46 to 1969-70 ===
1. Not Contested: 1945-46, 1948-49, 1949-50, 1953-54, 1956-57, 1957-58, 1961-62, 1964-65
2. 1946-47 Natal
3. 1947-48 Natal
4. 1950-51 Transvaal
5. 1951-52 Natal
6. 1952-53 Western Province
7. 1954-55 Natal
8. 1955-56 Western Province
9. 1958-59 Transvaal
10. 1959-60 Natal
11. 1960-61 Natal
12. 1962-63 Natal
13. 1963-64 Natal
14. 1965-66 Natal and Transvaal (shared)
15. 1966-67 Natal
16. 1967-68 Natal
17. 1968-69 Transvaal
18. 1969-70 Transvaal and Western Province (shared)

== International tours of South Africa from 1945-46 to 1969-70 ==
=== England, 1948-49 ===
- 1st Test at Kingsmead, Durban – England won by 2 wickets
- 2nd Test at Ellis Park Stadium, Johannesburg – match drawn
- 3rd Test at Newlands Cricket Ground, Cape Town – match drawn
- 4th Test at Ellis Park Stadium, Johannesburg – match drawn
- 5th Test at St George's Park, Port Elizabeth – England won by 3 wickets

=== Australia, 1949-50 ===
- 1st Test at Ellis Park Stadium, Johannesburg – Australia won by an innings and 85 runs
- 2nd Test at Newlands Cricket Ground, Cape Town – Australia won by 8 wickets
- 3rd Test at Kingsmead, Durban – Australia won by 5 wickets
- 4th Test at Ellis Park Stadium, Johannesburg – match drawn
- 5th Test at St George's Park, Port Elizabeth – Australia won by an innings and 259 runs

=== New Zealand, 1953-54 ===
- 1st Test at Kingsmead, Durban – South Africa won by an innings and 58 runs
- 2nd Test at Ellis Park Stadium, Johannesburg – South Africa won by 132 runs
- 3rd Test at Newlands Cricket Ground, Cape Town – match drawn
- 4th Test at Ellis Park Stadium, Johannesburg – South Africa won by 9 wickets
- 5th Test at St George's Park, Port Elizabeth – South Africa won by 5 wickets

=== England, 1956-57 ===
- 1st Test at Wanderers Stadium, Johannesburg – England won by 131 runs
- 2nd Test at Newlands Cricket Ground, Cape Town – England won by 312 runs
- 3rd Test at Kingsmead, Durban – match drawn
- 4th Test at Wanderers Stadium, Johannesburg – South Africa won by 17 runs
- 5th Test at St George's Park, Port Elizabeth – South Africa won by 58 runs

=== Australia, 1957-58 ===
- 1st Test at Wanderers Stadium, Johannesburg – match drawn
- 2nd Test at Newlands Cricket Ground, Cape Town – Australia won by an innings and 141 runs
- 3rd Test at Kingsmead, Durban – match drawn
- 4th Test at Wanderers Stadium, Johannesburg – Australia won by 10 wickets
- 5th Test at St George's Park, Port Elizabeth – Australia won by 8 wickets

=== Commonwealth XI, 1959-60 ===
A Commonwealth XI cricket team toured South Africa in October 1959, playing three first-class matches. Captained by Denis Compton, the Commonwealth XI included several famous or well-known players such as Tom Graveney, Brian Close, Bert Sutcliffe, Frank Tyson, Godfrey Evans, Roy Marshall, Bob Simpson and Ian Craig

=== New Zealand, 1961-62 ===
- 1st Test at Kingsmead, Durban – South Africa won by 30 runs
- 2nd Test at Wanderers Stadium, Johannesburg – match drawn
- 3rd Test at Newlands Cricket Ground, Cape Town – New Zealand won by 72 runs
- 4th Test at Wanderers Stadium, Johannesburg – South Africa won by an innings and 51 runs
- 5th Test at St George's Park, Port Elizabeth – New Zealand won by 40 runs

=== England, 1964-65 ===
- 1st Test at Kingsmead, Durban – England won by an innings and 104 runs
- 2nd Test at Wanderers Stadium, Johannesburg – match drawn
- 3rd Test at Newlands Cricket Ground, Cape Town – match drawn
- 4th Test at Wanderers Stadium, Johannesburg – match drawn
- 5th Test at St George's Park, Port Elizabeth – match drawn

=== Australia, 1966-67 ===
- 1st Test at Wanderers Stadium, Johannesburg – South Africa won by 233 runs
- 2nd Test at Newlands Cricket Ground, Cape Town – Australia won by 6 wickets
- 3rd Test at Kingsmead, Durban – South Africa won by 8 wickets
- 4th Test at Wanderers Stadium, Johannesburg – match drawn
- 5th Test at St George's Park, Port Elizabeth – South Africa won by 7 wickets

=== Australia, 1969-70 ===
- 1st Test at Newlands Cricket Ground, Cape Town – South Africa won by 170 runs
- 2nd Test at Kingsmead, Durban – South Africa won by an innings and 129 runs
- 3rd Test at Wanderers Stadium, Johannesburg – South Africa won by 307 runs
- 4th Test at St George's Park, Port Elizabeth – South Africa won by 323 runs
