= Johnny Martin (cricketer) =

Australian cricketer (1931–1992)

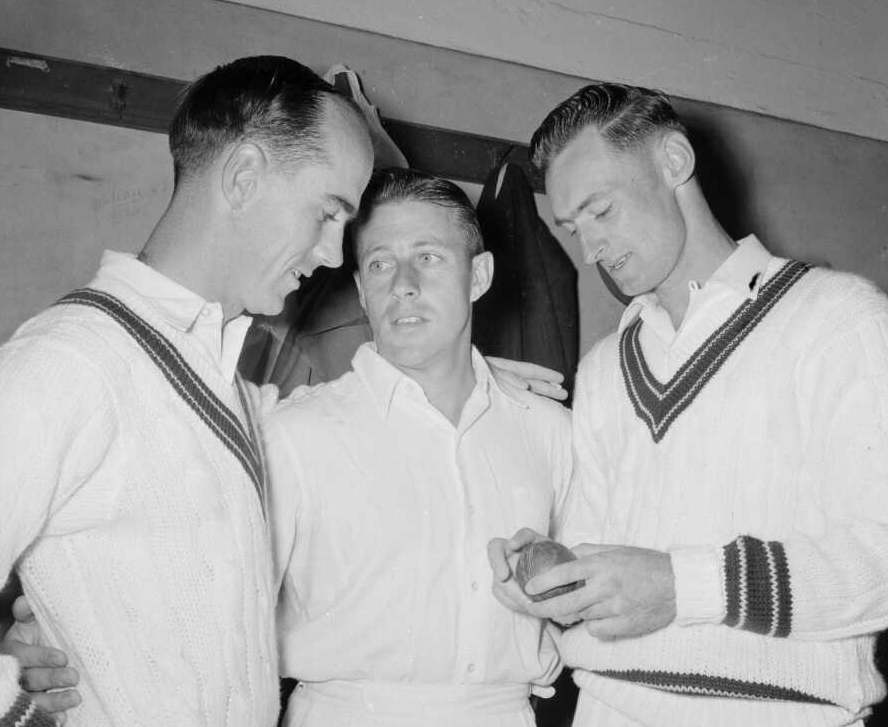
- Ian Craig, Johnny Martin, and Brian Booth in New Zealand in 1960

Personal information
- Born: 28 July 1931; Wingham, New South Wales
- Died: 15 July 1992 (aged 60); Burrell Creek, New South Wales
- Batting: Left-handed
- Bowling: Left-arm unorthodox

International information
- National side: Australia
- Test debut (cap 216): 30 December 1960 v West Indies
- Last Test: 24 February 1967 v South Africa

Career statistics
Competition	Test	First-class
Matches	8	135
Runs scored	214	3,970
Batting average	17.83	23.77
100s/50s	0/1	1/21
Top score	55	101
Balls bowled	1,846	27,296
Wickets	17	445
Bowling average	48.94	31.17
5 wickets in innings	0	17
10 wickets in match	0	1
Best bowling	3/56	8/97
Catches/stumpings	5/–	114/–
- Source: Cricinfo, 10 September 2022

John Wesley Martin (28 July 1931 – 15 July 1992) was an Australian cricketer who played in eight Test matches from 1960 to 1967.
