= Perthville =

- Town
- Coordinates: 33°29′0″S 149°33′0″E
- Country: Australia
- State: New South Wales
- LGA: Bathurst Regional Council
- Location: 208 km (129 mi) W of Sydney; 10 km (6.2 mi) S of Bathurst, New South Wales

Government
  - State electorate: Bathurst
  - Federal division: Calare

Population
  - Total: 362 (2021 census)
- Postcode: 2795

Perthville is a small town in New South Wales, Australia. The town is located on the Central Tablelands, approximately 10 kilometres (6.2 mi) from the regional city of Bathurst. The town has evolved over time due to road improvements to be a satellite suburb of Bathurst.

Perthville had a railway station, now closed, on the Main Western line between Bathurst and Blayney.

The town contains a large convent of the Sisters of St Joseph, founded in 1872. This included a girls boarding school.

The Uniting Church has also been strongly represented in the town.

Cricketer Brian Booth was born in Perthville in 1933.
