= Manoj Parmar =

Indian cricketer

Personal information
- Full name: Manoj Mansinh Parmar
- Born: 1 March 1967 (age 59); Botad, Gujarat, India
- Batting: Right-handed
- Role: Wicket-keeper

Domestic team information
- Years: Team
- 1991/92–2001/02: Saurashtra
- 2003: Oxfordshire

Career statistics
Competition	First-class	List A
Matches	40	25
Runs scored	1,256	341
Batting average	20.93	22.73
100s/50s	0/6	0/2
Top score	71*	69*
Balls bowled	12	–
Wickets	0	–
Bowling average	–	–
5 wickets in innings	–	–
10 wickets in match	–	–
Best bowling	–	–
Catches/stumpings	79/16	21/10
- Source: ESPNcricinfo, 27 May 2011

Manoj Mansinh Parmar (born 1 March 1967) is a former Indian cricketer and coach. Parmar was a right-handed batsman who fielded as a wicket-keeper. He was born in Botad, Gujarat.

Parmar made his first-class debut for Saurashtra in the 1991–92 Ranji Trophy against Maharashtra. Parmar played first-class cricket from the 1991–92 season to season 2001–02, making 40 first-class appearances. In his 40 matches, he scored 1,256 runs at a batting average of 20.93, with a high score of 71*. His highest score came against Orissa in 2000. In his capacity as a wicket-keeper, he took 79 catches and made 16 stumpings.

Parmar also played List A cricket for Saurashtra, making his debut in that format against Baroda in the 1993–94 Ranji Trophy One Day tournament. He played a further 23 List A matches for Saurashtra, the last coming against Maharashtra in the 2000–01 Ranji Trophy One Day tournament. In his 24 limited-overs matches for the team, he scored 340 runs at an average of 24.28, with a high score of 69*. His highest score came against Maharashtra in his last List A match in India. Behind the stumps he took 21 catches and made 10 stumpings.

He later appeared in a single List A match in England for Oxfordshire against Herefordshire in the 1st round of the 2004 Cheltenham & Gloucester Trophy which was held in 2003. He was dismissed for 1 run in this match by Franklyn Rose.

Parmar spent several seasons as overseas professional/coach for Fife side, Falkland Cricket Club in Scotland in the mid-1990s.

Parmar now coaches the MP Sports Cricket Club in Thame, Oxfordshire, just next to Chinnor Rugby Club. He also runs a sports supplies shop elsewhere in Thame.
