= Brian Booth =

Australian cricketer and field hockey player (1933–2023)

Brian Booth MBE
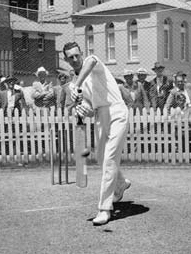
- Booth in c. 1959

Personal information
- Full name: Brian Charles Booth
- Born: 19 October 1933; Perthville, New South Wales, Australia
- Died: 19 May 2023 (aged 89)
- Nickname: Sam
- Height: 1.81 m (5 ft 11 in)
- Batting: Right-handed
- Bowling: Right-arm off spin
- Role: Middle-order batsman

International information
- National side: Australia
- Test debut (cap 221): 27 July 1961 v England
- Last Test: 7 January 1966 v England

Domestic team information
- Years: Team
- 1954/55–1968/69: New South Wales

Career statistics
Competition	Test	FC
Matches	29	183
Runs scored	1,773	11,265
Batting average	42.21	45.42
100s/50s	5/10	26/60
Top score	169	214*
Balls bowled	436	2,112
Wickets	3	16
Bowling average	48.66	59.75
5 wickets in innings	0	0
10 wickets in match	0	0
Best bowling	2/33	2/29
Catches/stumpings	17/0	119/0
- Source: CricketArchive, 4 March 2008

Brian Charles Booth MBE (19 October 1933 – 19 May 2023) was an Australian cricketer who played in 29 Test matches between 1961 and 1966, and 93 first-class matches for New South Wales. He captained Australia in two Tests during the 1965–66 Ashes series while regular captain Bob Simpson was absent due to illness and injury. Booth was a graceful right-handed middle order batsman at No. 4 or 5, and occasionally bowled right arm medium pace or off spin. He had an inclination to use his feet to charge spin bowlers. Booth was known for his sportsmanship on the field and often invoked Christianity while discussing ethics and sport.

Born near the New South Wales country town of Bathurst, Booth moved to Sydney in 1952 and played in the grade cricket competition while training to become a teacher. He made his first-class debut for the New South Wales cricket team and came to prominence in dramatic circumstances in his second match, against the touring Englishmen in 1954–55. Due to late withdrawals, Booth was selected at late notice and had to be called from work on the morning of the match. Arriving after the start of the match, he scored 74 following a batting collapse. Booth struggled to make an impression early in his career and missed a season to train with the Australian field hockey team for the 1956 Olympics in Melbourne. Upon returning to first-class cricket in 1957–58, he held down a regular position in the state team while the Test players were touring overseas. Booth gradually progressed and gained selection on the 1959–60 Australian Second XI tour to New Zealand.

Booth was selected for the Australian team that toured England in 1961 and played in the final two Tests. Upon his return to Australia, Booth made two centuries in the 1962–63 home Test series against England, establishing himself in the Test team. He made two further centuries the following summer against South Africa and was named the Australian player of the year. Following the retirement of Richie Benaud, Booth was appointed vice-captain under Simpson as Australia embarked on a successful 1964 tour of England, which saw the retention of the Ashes. Booth played his final Test series in 1965–66 against England, captaining Australia in the First and Third Tests because Simpson was sidelined with a broken wrist and chickenpox respectively. The First Test was drawn but Australia fell to its first innings defeat in almost ten years in the Third Test. As he was also in a form slump, Booth was dropped as the Australian selectors made mass changes, ending his career. In retirement, Booth returned to his teaching duties and served as a Baptist lay-preacher. He was inducted into the Cricket NSW Hall of Fame in 2014.

== Early years ==
The son of "Snowy" Booth, a market gardener and talented country cricketer, Booth was born in Perthville, located 9 km (5.6 mi) outside the New South Wales regional town of Bathurst. His father hung pictures of Don Bradman and Stan McCabe on the wall and told him that "these are the two greatest living cricketers". Booth represented Bathurst High School at the age of 13 and played first grade cricket in Bathurst at 15. He was selected for a New South Wales youth countryside at the age of just 14. In 1950, Booth represented New South Wales Country against a combined Sydney team, and moved to St. George to play on a weekly basis two years later. He made the first grade team at the age of 19 and began a four-year course at Sydney Teachers College. Booth also played hockey in Perthville and began playing for St George upon his arrival in Sydney.

Booth made his first-class debut for New South Wales against Queensland in the 1954–55 Sheffield Shield. He made a duck in the first innings before adding 19 in the second. New South Wales won, but Booth was dropped when the Test players returned from international duty. Booth was recalled a month later for a match against Len Hutton's English cricket team at the Sydney Cricket Ground. Arthur Morris and Bill Watson had to withdraw at late notice and Booth was asked to play, having already started his day's work as a teacher at Hurlstone Agricultural College. He caught a train and arrived at the ground more than half an hour after the start of play, by which time New South Wales had collapsed to 3/12. New South Wales fell further to 5/26 before Booth came in with a borrowed cap and bat to join Peter Philpott. They put on an 83-run partnership, and Booth eventually finished the innings unbeaten on 74 as the hosts folded for 172. Booth made a duck in the second innings and took his maiden first-class wicket as New South Wales defeated Hutton's men. It was only the tourists' second loss for the campaign, and the last match in Booth's debut season.

Booth had a low key season in 1955–56, struggling to find a regular position in the New South Wales team. As there were no international matches during the summer, the Test players were available for the whole campaign. He played in six matches and had few opportunities, managing only 157 runs at 31.40, passing fifty on only one occasion. New South Wales went on to claim a hat-trick of Sheffield Shield titles.

Booth was selected for the New South Wales hockey team in 1955 and toured New Zealand in 1956. Good performances on this tour led to his selection in the Australian Olympic squad for the 1956 Summer Olympics in Melbourne, but he had an anxious wait following media claims that he had received out-of-pocket expenses for playing cricket, which would make him a professional and therefore ineligible to participate in the Olympics. Eventually, Booth and fellow first-class cricketers Ian Dick and Maurice Foley were cleared to play for Australia. Booth then missed the 1956–57 Sheffield Shield season because he was part of the Australian field hockey team that finished fifth at the Olympics. Booth was selected as an inside left but was not utilised in any of Australia's matches until the classification matches for 5th to 8th places

In 1957–58, the Australian Test team toured South Africa during the southern hemisphere summer, opening up opportunities in the Shield competition back in Australia. Booth established himself at first-class level with 503 runs at 50.30. After scoring two fifties, he broke through for his maiden first-class century against Victoria at the Sydney Cricket Ground, in his last match of the season. He put on a partnership of 325 with future Test teammate Norm O'Neill in fewer than four hours. It was his fifteenth first-class match, and helped his state secure a fifth successive title with a ten-wicket win over their arch-rivals. With the Test players returning to Australia in 1958–59, Booth again faced more competition for places. He struggled, playing six matches and aggregating only 190 runs at 31.66. He only had six innings for the entire season, and in his only opportunity against Peter May's touring Englishmen, he made a duck. Booth passed 50 on two occasions during the season, making 75 and 85. In one high-scoring match against South Australia, he took 0/97 with his part-time off spin.

== First-class consolidation ==
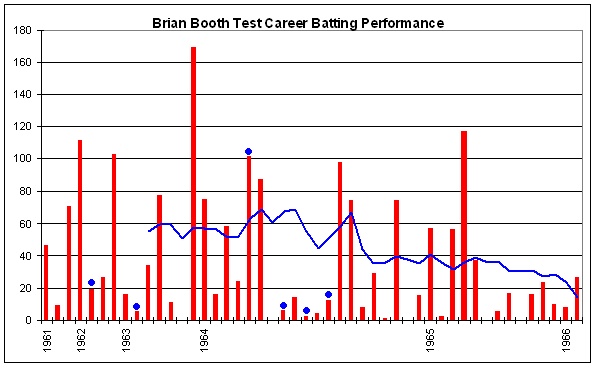
Booth's Test career batting performance. The red bars indicate the runs that he scored in an innings, with the blue line indicating the batting average in his last ten innings. The blue dots indicate an innings where he remained not out.

The national team toured the Indian subcontinent during the 1959–60 Australian season, opening up more vacancies at a domestic level. Booth had a strong first-class season, scoring 718 runs at 65.27 with two centuries to place third on the run-scoring aggregates. He started the season with 168 as New South Wales defeated Queensland by an innings before scoring 177 two matches later in an innings win over South Australia. His state completed a seventh Sheffield Shield triumph in succession.

Booth's performances saw him selected for a second choice Australian team that toured New Zealand under the captaincy of Ian Craig. He scored 105 in his first innings for his country, in a victory over Auckland. Booth scored 184 runs at 30.66 and took three wickets at 25.00 in the four international matches against New Zealand. Booth considered retiring after the season, feeling that the time needed for first-class cricket was impinging on his work as a lay preacher and a Christian youth worker.

Booth brought himself into contention for the Test selection with a series of strong displays in 1960–61. He aggregated 981 runs at an average of 65.40, with three centuries. Only five players scored more runs, all at lower averages. Two of the centuries were in combined Australian XI matches at the end of the season for expected Test squad members. In a match against Tasmania, Booth struck a breezy 100 from 104 balls in 90 minutes. Another highlight was an 87 against the touring West Indies, helping New South Wales to complete an innings win. Booth's productivity helped his state to another Sheffield Shield win.

== Test career ==
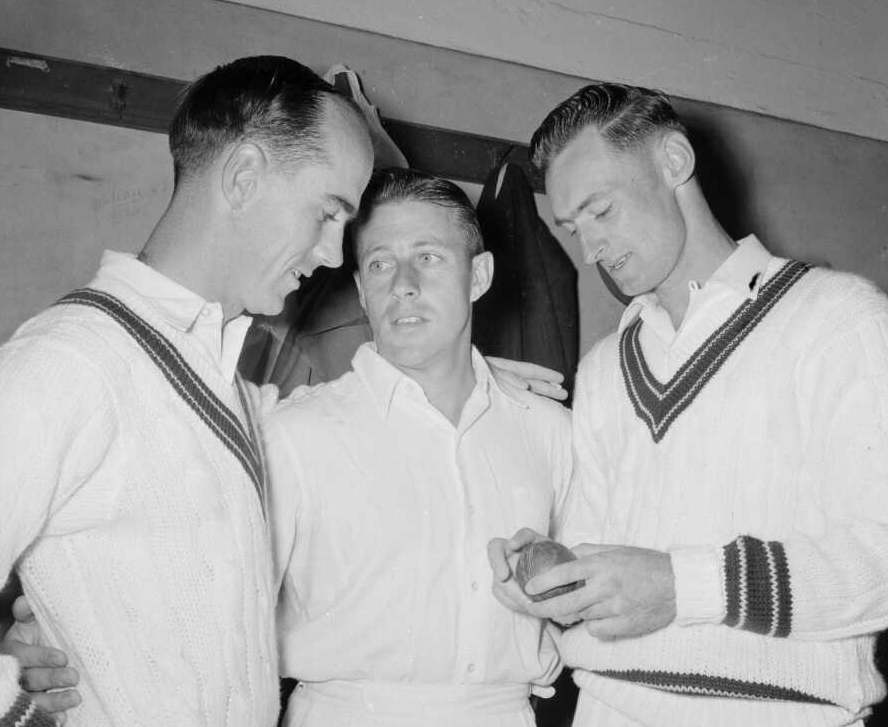
Ian Craig, Johnny Martin and Booth (right) in New Zealand in 1960

Booth was then selected for the Ashes tour of England in 1961; he and Victorian opening batsman Bill Lawry, the two uncapped batsmen in the team, were regarded as the last two players chosen. Booth quickly gained a reputation for his attention to physical fitness. He led the Australians in their morning exercises during the sea voyage, which captain Richie Benaud made optional. After scoring 37 and seven against Worcestershire in his first match on English soil, Booth broke through for his first century for Australia, scoring 113 against Cambridge University in his fifth match. He made 59 against the Marylebone Cricket Club, but was overlooked for the first three Tests.

Booth scored 127 not out against Somerset, and in the next match against Lancashire, he was caught behind for 99 from the bowling of another Brian Booth. He played consistently, with two more half-centuries to earn his debut in the Fourth Test at Old Trafford in place of Colin McDonald. The series was evenly poised at 1–1, and Australia batted first on a pitch that initially assisted fast bowling. The surface was tinged with green and England fielded a pace line-up that included Brian Statham and Fred Trueman. Booth was struck in the torso by his first ball, a bouncer that did not rise as high as he expected. He managed to repel a spearing yorker on the second ball and compiled a battling 46, the second highest score on the difficult pitch, featuring in a partnership of 46—the highest in Australia's innings—with Bill Lawry. Australia managed only 190 on the bowler-friendly pitch. Booth only managed nine in the second innings before Australia retained the Ashes after an English collapse on the final day resulted in a 54-run win. In the drawn Fifth and final Test at The Oval, Booth came in with the score at 4/211 after the dismissal of Norm O'Neill for 117. He featured in a 185-run partnership with Peter Burge. Booth was dismissed for 71 while attempting to loft the spin of Tony Lock over the infield, as captain Richie Benaud needed quick runs; observers felt the need to attack cost Booth his maiden Test century. Booth added three more 70s in the closing tour matches before the team returned to Australia.

The 1961–62 season was entirely a domestic season. Booth scored 507 runs at 42.25 with two centuries, against Queensland and South Australia. He placed 13th on the run-scoring aggregates, helping New South Wales to win its ninth consecutive Sheffield Shield.

After scoring 72 in the opening match of the season and adding 41 against the touring Englishmen for New South Wales, Booth retained his place in the Test team for the 1962–63 Ashes series. He scored his maiden Test century in the First Test at the Gabba, compiling 112 in the first innings of a high scoring draw. Thirteen players reached fifty, but Booth was the only player to reach three figures. English captain Ted Dexter attempted to shut down Booth's scoring by employing leg theory. In the Second Test at the Melbourne Cricket Ground, Fred Titmus bowled outside leg stump with five men on the one side, but Booth completed consecutive centuries with 103 in the second innings. As a result of Dexter's defensive field placings, Booth scored at only half the rate he managed in the First Test. Booth took six hours to reach triple figures and hit only four boundaries. His innings was not enough to prevent England from completing a seven-wicket victory. Booth was unable to maintain his form for the rest of the season, with 34 and 77 in the Fourth Test in Adelaide being the only other times that he passed 20. Australia won the Third Test, drawing the series, and Booth ended the series with 404 runs at 50.50. He added a further three fifties in the Sheffield Shield as Victoria ended New South Wales' nine-year winning streak.

Booth started the 1963–64 season strongly. He scored centuries in his first two innings, recording 121 and 169 not out against Queensland and Western Australia respectively. In his rapid innings against Western Australia at the SCG, which took only 165 minutes, Booth reached 100 in 94 minutes during the second session of the day. In the lead-up to the Tests, Booth scored 63 for his state against South Africa but was unable to prevent defeat. In the Tests, he began the way he did in the previous season, with a century. Coming to the crease with Australia at 3/88 in the first innings of the First Test in Brisbane, Booth withstood an opening burst of bouncers from South African spearhead Peter Pollock. He went on to accumulate his Test best of 169 from 81 overs of batting, in a display that gained wide praise because of his elegant stroke-making. One newspaper proclaimed that his innings had "more Grace than the Princess of Monaco." Ray Robinson said "it was a tailored innings, fit to be put on display in a showcase and unrumpled by a single chance". South African skipper Trevor Goddard later said, "We didn't mind the leather chasing, when he played so charmingly." Booth's innings was the highlight of a match that was uneventful in terms of cricket but notorious for the no-balling of Ian Meckiff. A broken finger sidelined Booth for a month and prevented him from playing in the Second Test, but he returned for the Third Test in Sydney, and began a sequence of 75, 16, 58 and 24. He finished the series in the Fifth Test in his hometown, top-scoring in both of Australia's innings, with 102 not out and 87 in a draw. It capped off a productive fortnight for Booth; he had scored 162 not out against South Australia before the final Test. In four Tests, he aggregated 531 runs at 88.50. For the entire first-class season, Booth had struck five centuries and totaled 1,180 runs. According to Gideon Haigh, he had "played exquisitely" throughout the season, which was his career peak and saw him named the Australian Cricketer of the Year for 1963–64.

=== Vice-captaincy ===
Captain Richie Benaud retired at the end of the South Africa series — he had already relinquished the leadership after the First Test—and Booth was elevated to the vice-captaincy under Bob Simpson for the 1964 tour of England. Along with Simpson and Lawry, Booth was one of three on-tour selectors. Some observers felt that the personable Booth would have been more popular among the playing group than Simpson, while others thought that he would not have been hard-nosed enough in pursuing his team's competitive interest. While Simpson was known for being relentlessly hard-nosed, he was also abrasive and sometimes irritated others by making derogatory comments towards teammates. Booth again ran daily fitness classes during the voyage, and on this occasion, Simpson made them compulsory for the players. Booth started the tour well, scoring 109 not out in his third match for the summer, against Surrey. He passed 50 three more times before the start of the Tests, when his form waned.

Booth failed to pass 20 in the first six innings of the Test series. With Australia 1–0 up after three Tests, a draw in the Fourth Test was sufficient to retain the Ashes. Booth regained his touch with three scores beyond fifty in four innings leading up to the Fourth Test, including 132 against Middlesex. When the teams reconvened at Old Trafford for the Fourth Test, Booth made a "courtly" 98 in a 219-run partnership with Simpson. The Australians batted for more than two days to burn off any chance of an England victory. Booth then scored 193 not out, his highest for the summer, in Australia's 7/315 declared against Yorkshire, setting up the tourists' victory. He made 74 in the Fifth Test and ended the series with 210 runs at 42.00. Along with Simpson and Lawry, Booth was one of three Australians to accumulate more than 1,500 first-class runs for the English summer.

Three Tests against India and one against Pakistan lay ahead of Booth as the Australians visited the Indian subcontinent on the late-1964 voyage back to Australia. He had a mediocre time, passing fifty only once, with 74 in the Second Test at Bombay's Brabourne Stadium. That innings was terminated when Indian wicketkeeper KS Indrajitsinhji fumbled a stumping opportunity and the ball rolled back down the pitch. Despite breaking the stumps with his hand while the ball was not in close proximity, Indrajitsinhji's appeal for a stumping was upheld. According to Gideon Haigh, "It seemed like ten men [one of the Australians was ill] were pitted against thirteen [eleven Indian players and two umpires]". In the four Tests Booth compiled 127 runs at 21.17 and took the only three wickets of his Test career on the spin-friendly subcontinental surfaces. He took 2/33 in the drawn Third Test in Calcutta, before capturing his final wicket in the second innings of the only Test against Pakistan in Karachi. At the time, cricket matches in Australia and England were typically interrupted by the Sunday rest day, and Booth used these for religious observances. However, this custom was not observed on the subcontinent. Booth wanted to withdraw for personal reasons but decided to play due to injuries and illnesses to other players. He made 57 in a Test against Pakistan in Melbourne upon arrival in Australia. It was the only home Test of the season before the hosts embarked upon a tour to the Caribbean. Booth scored 115 for his state against the Pakistanis and ended the Australian season with 327 runs at 46.71.

Australia arrived in the West Indies in 1964–65 for five Tests against the emerging power of the 1960s, who were led by the hostile express pace bowling of Wes Hall and Charlie Griffith. After narrowly evading a bouncer at the start of his innings, Booth made a battling top-score of 56 in the First Test loss at Sabina Park in Jamaica. He then made 117 in the Second Test at Port of Spain in Trinidad, an innings that included a stand of 228 with Bob Cowper, which helped Australia hang on for a draw. It was to be Booth's last Test century, an innings he regarded as his "most satisfying", having collected a series of bruises, on a ground with no sightscreen. Booth did not pass 40 in the last three Tests and ended with 234 runs at 29.25 as Australia lost 2–1, their first series loss since the 1956 Ashes series and their first series loss against a team other than England, excluding a one-off Test against Pakistan in 1956. He had particular trouble with the pace of Griffith, and on one occasion, the paceman hit him on the nose before yorking him on the next ball; Booth maintains that he did not see the ball. Booth added two more fifties in the four first-class matches outside the Tests.

=== Temporary captain ===
At the start of the 1965–66 season, Booth scored fifties in three consecutive matches, including an 80 against the MCC tourists. The 1965–66 Ashes series saw Booth captain Australia for the first time in a Test. Simpson sustained a broken wrist, leaving Booth to lead the hosts in the First Test in Brisbane. Booth prepared quietly, leaving Simpson to handle the press. He won the toss and elected to bat; fewer than two hours of play was possible on a rain-shortened first day, and the second day was entirely washed out. Booth made only 16 before being caught and bowled by Fred Titmus on the third morning, but after centuries to Lawry and debutant Doug Walters, Booth declared at 6/443. Booth rotated his spinners and dismissed the tourists for 280; the match ended in a draw with England at 3/186 after being forced to follow on. When Geoff Boycott pushed a ball from leg spinner Peter Philpott away with his hand, Booth refused to appeal for handling the ball.

After the drawn Second Test, Simpson contracted chickenpox, so Booth was again captain for the Third Test in front of his home crowd at the SCG. It was an extra burden, as Booth had made only 49 runs in the first two Tests; his teammates felt that their captain had been too anxious following his struggles against Griffith in the Caribbean. However, there was to be no fairytale for Booth, who later admitted to being in psychological disarray; he was unaware if the rolling done on the pitch after the toss was legal, and Philpott arrived late and ran onto the field just as play was starting. England batted first and their openers, Boycott and Bob Barber, immediately seized the initiative, putting on 234 for the first wicket in four hours. The tourists made 488 and Booth scored eight as Australia replied with 221 and were forced to follow on. He made 27 in the second innings before being bowled by David Allen as the hosts fell to an innings defeat. It was Australia's biggest defeat at home since the Fourth Test of the 1911–12 Ashes series when they lost by an innings and 225 runs. After the match, England captain Mike Smith told Booth that he looked forward to seeing him in the Fourth Test, but Booth prophetically predicted his downfall.

With Australia 0–1 down, the selectors took drastic action and dropped Booth, Cowper, Philpott, McKenzie and David Sincock. The revamped team won the next Test by an innings, and Booth never played for Australia again. If he had played another Test, Booth would have been eligible for the New South Wales Cricket Association's retirement bonus of AUD50 a Test. Booth's last five Test innings had netted only 84 runs. After the match, he received a letter from Sir Don Bradman, then a member of the selection panel and the Australian Board of Control:

Never before have I written to a player to express my regret at his omission from the Australian XI. In your case I am making an exception because I want you to know how much my colleagues and I disliked having to make this move. Captain one match and out of the side the next looks like ingratitude, but you understand the circumstances and will be the first to admit that your form has not been good.

Booth ended the first-class season with 596 runs at 29.80, including four half-centuries. He continued to play for New South Wales before retiring during the 1968–69 season.

== Final first-class seasons ==
In the 1966–67 Australian season, Booth scored 638 runs at 49.07, ranking fifth in the run-scoring aggregates. He scored 149 against Queensland, and added four fifties, including two scores in the 90s. As a result, Booth was made vice-captain of an Australian team that toured New Zealand under the leadership of Les Favell, while the national team was in South Africa. After failing to pass 26 in his first five innings, Booth made his highest first-class score, 214 not out, against Central Districts, and was Australia's leading run-scorer for the tour. After scoring only 62 runs in the first four innings in the opening three international matches against New Zealand, Booth made 179 in the fourth and final match.

Booth was less successful in his penultimate season in 1967–68, with only 426 runs at 23.66, including two half-centuries, both against Victoria. A decision by administrators to introduce Sunday play into the Sheffield Shield ended his career, as he refused to make himself available for games that involved Sunday play. He played in only one match in his final season in 1968–69, scoring a duck and 15 as New South Wales lost to South Australia by three wickets. Booth continued to play grade cricket for the St. George club until 1976–77, leading the batting averages and aggregates in 1974–75. With 10,674 runs at 45.42, he was fifth on the all-time run-scoring aggregates in Sydney grade competition at the time of his retirement but has now dropped to ninth.

== Style and the place of religion in sport ==
Brian Booth, that model of a man and of a batsman who tends to be under-rated and forgotten because both he and his cricket were so blamelessly self-effacing. Tall, upright, correct in method, ever-patient, he repeated the hundred he had got at Brisbane, and so gave England a target to go for while all around him were failing.

–E. W. Swanton

Booth was regarded as an elegant batsman who had an erect stance at the crease. He was known for not hitting the ball hard but for having an easy and relaxed style. In hockey, a player is not allowed to lift his stick above the shoulders; this background strengthened Booth's forearms and wrists and enabled him to impart momentum on the ball without a large swing of the bat. He was particularly known for his late cut and cover drive, which he played in a manner not dissimilar to Mark Waugh. He was also known for his quick footwork against spin bowling and was rarely stumped, and he had the ability to change his batting tempo. He quickly got into position and typically moved onto the back foot to cover his stumps. A lean player, Booth stood 181 cm, weighed 66 kg and refrained from smoking, gambling and drinking. He was known for his efficient out-fielding, and on the second day of the Second Test against the West Indies in Trinidad in 1964–65, he ran out Gary Sobers and Basil Butcher with strong throws from the outfield. Booth started as a part-time leg spinner before converting to off spin.

Booth had a reputation for walking when he knew that he was out, without waiting for the umpire's decision, and he was regarded as a player and leader of the highest principles. He was known for his record of instilling high standards of conduct into his players and prevented them from showing dissent towards unfavourable umpiring decisions. Robinson said that "if a prize were offered for sportsmanship among Australia's post-war cricketers Brian Booth ought to win it hands down". Lawry regarded Booth as one of the most gentlemanly cricketers that he knew.

A committed Christian, Booth was an Anglican lay-preacher, and often invoked religious and ethical arguments while talking about issues such as sportsmanship. Booth became intensely religious in the 1950s after befriending Pastor Roy Gray, a colleague in district cricket and a classmate at Sydney Teachers College. Gray challenged his friend's faith, and Booth reflected that "Until that point, sport had really been my God". During Booth's career, the media made much of his religious convictions. After scoring his maiden Test century, he was asked whether he felt that God was with him. He replied in the affirmative, and the next day, a newspaper printed the headline "England can't win. God is on Brian Booth's side."

Booth co-authored Cricket and Christianity with Paul White and his autobiography, Booth to Bat, also with Paul White, and also wrote Hockey Fundamentals. In 1998 he wrote Sport and sportsmanship: a Christian perspective towards 2000 for the Australian Christian Forum on Education. He believed that the foundations of sport were courtesy and fairness, and he condemned the prevalence of verbal jousting in the modern game. During his career, he often spoke at religious functions in combination with other Christian cricketers. He appeared with the English Test opener Reverend David Sheppard at Sydney Town Hall and preached with Conrad Hunte in the West Indies.

Despite Booth's views being more genteel than those of most of his teammates, there was little friction. Early in his state career, Booth declined to join a Melbourne Cup gambling sweep organised by captain Keith Miller. However, Miller included Booth in the event by assigning him to look after the money. Booth said "That was typical of Keith. That he was able to turn something that might have been a problem into something positive, giving me a responsibility, making me feel part of the team." He added, "The boys just accepted me for what I was. If they didn't share the strength of my convictions, they were quite happy for me to hold them." Simpson said that Booth never attempted to impose his beliefs on his teammates and never gave any inkling that he disapproved of their behaviour.

== Outside cricket ==
After retirement, Booth resumed full-time duties as a Sydney schoolmaster. He spent 12 years as a teacher in government secondary schools in New South Wales before becoming an instructor in physical education at Sydney Teachers College in 1967. Before retiring in 1989, Booth served as the head of the Health and Human Movement Studies Department at the Sydney Institute of Education—the successor of the STC—for five years.

In 1958, he married Judith Williams, whom he met at STC. They had four daughters, the first being born in 1961, and six grandchildren. Booth was the uncle of hammer thrower Brooke Krueger-Billett, who represented Australia at the 2006 Commonwealth Games.

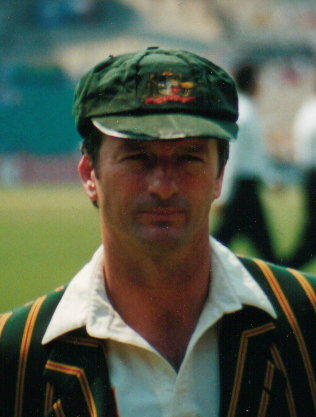
Booth strongly criticised the sledging tactics used by the Australian team led by Steve Waugh (pictured).

In 1967, Booth was appointed the founding chairman of the Youth Advisory Council, a body that sought to address community issues such as hooliganism. Booth was made a life member of the New South Wales Cricket Association (NSWCA) in 1974 and served as a vice-president for four years from 1973–74 onwards. He was awarded life membership of the Marylebone Cricket Club, the home of cricket. Booth had remained involved in grassroots cricket with St George. He had served as the club president among other positions on the executive committee, and served as a coach for many years. The Booth Saunders pavilion at the club's home ground, Hurstville Oval, is jointly named in his honor. He was also the patron of the St George Randwick Men's Hockey Club and the St George Women's Hockey Club.

In the 1974 Federal Election, Booth gained preselection as the Liberal candidate for the Division of St George, standing against Science Minister William Morrison of the ruling Australian Labor Party. The seat, which had changed hands at several elections in the past, was held by Morrison for Labor, who were returned to office. In the 1982 Birthday Honours, Booth was awarded the MBE for "services to the community and sport".

In 2002, Booth returned to the public spotlight when he condemned the sledging, or verbal intimidation tactics, that are used in modern cricket. He stated, "I can't remember in the games that I played in, I can't ever remember being sledged, and I can't ever remember sledging anybody", in reference to Steve Waugh's Australian team, which was perceived as being too hostile to opposing players. In the Australian edition of the 2002 Wisden Cricketers' Almanack, he wrote a chapter titled "The Curse of Sledging".

Booth was inducted into the Cricket NSW Hall of Fame in 2014 alongside Geoff Lawson and Margaret Peden. He was further honoured by the St George District Cricket Club in December 2020 as one of sixteen original inductees to the club's Hall of Fame. Booth's contribution to his home town was recognised alongside Norma Johnston in October 2022, with the announcement that the pair would each have a sightscreen named after them at the redeveloped Bathurst Sportsground.

== Death ==
On 19 May 2023, Cricket Australia announced that Booth had died at age 89.

== Notes ==
Sporting positions
Preceded by Bob Simpson	Australian Test cricket captains 1965/66	Succeeded by Bob Simpson
