= Bob Simpson (cricketer) =

Australian cricketer (1936–2025)

Bob Simpson AO
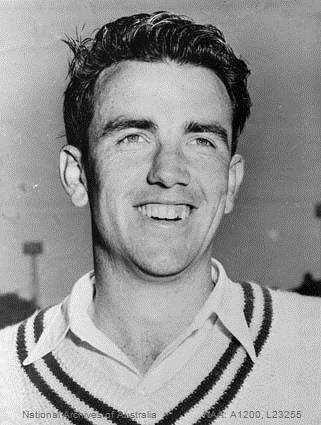
- Simpson in 1957

Personal information
- Full name: Robert Baddeley Simpson
- Born: 3 February 1936; Marrickville, New South Wales, Australia
- Died: 16 August 2025 (aged 89)
- Nickname: Simmo
- Height: 179 cm (5 ft 10 in)
- Batting: Right-handed
- Bowling: Right-arm leg spin
- Role: Batsman

International information
- National side: Australia (1957–1978)
- Test debut (cap 209): 23 December 1957 v South Africa
- Last Test: 3 May 1978 v West Indies
- ODI debut (cap 44): 22 February 1978 v West Indies
- Last ODI: 12 April 1978 v West Indies

Domestic team information
- Years: Team
- 1952/53–1955/56: New South Wales
- 1956/57–1960/61: Western Australia
- 1961/62–1977/78: New South Wales

Head coaching information
- Years: Team
- 1986–1996: Australia
- 1999–2001: Lancashire

Career statistics
Competition	Test	ODI	FC	LA
Matches	62	2	257	6
Runs scored	4,869	36	21,029	165
Batting average	46.81	18.00	56.22	33.00
100s/50s	10/27	0/0	60/100	0/0
Top score	311	23	359	37
Balls bowled	6,881	102	27,998	166
Wickets	71	2	349	4
Bowling average	42.26	47.50	38.07	33.50
5 wickets in innings	2	0	6	0
10 wickets in match	0	0	0	0
Best bowling	5/57	2/30	5/33	2/30
Catches/stumpings	110/–	4/–	383/–	6/–
Medal record
Men's Cricket
Representing Australia as Coach
ICC Cricket World Cup
Winner	1987 India and Pakistan
- Source: CricketArchive, 14 April 2008

Robert Baddeley Simpson AO (3 February 1936 – 16 August 2025), known as Simmo, was an Australian cricketer who played for New South Wales, Western Australia and the Australian national team. He captained the Australian team from 1963/64 until 1967/68 and again in 1977/78. He later had a highly successful term as the coach of the national team.

An outstanding fielder with the highest catch rate in Tests, Simpson was a top-level right-handed batsman and semi-regular leg spin bowler. After ten years in retirement, he returned to the spotlight at age 41 to captain Australia during the era of World Series Cricket.

In 1986, Simpson was appointed coach of the Australian team, a position he held until being replaced by Geoff Marsh in July 1996. Under Simpson's tutelage, the team went from a struggling team, losing a succession of Test series, to the strongest team in world cricket. Some of the team's greatest achievements in his time as coach were winning the 1987 World Cup, regaining The Ashes in England in 1989, and overcoming the previously dominant West Indies on their home grounds in 1995. He also coached county cricket in England, with Leicestershire and Lancashire.

== Early years ==
Born to Scottish immigrants from Falkirk, Simpson grew up in the inner-southwestern Sydney suburb of Marrickville. His father Jock was a printer and played soccer for Stenhousemuir in the Scottish League, his grandfather Harry played briefly for Stoke, and the 1910s England international football player Jock Simpson was also a relative. Simpson was encouraged as a schoolboy by his two elder brothers Bill and Jack, who played in first division Sydney Grade Cricket for many years. He began his own career as a fast bowler and batsman who played in any position. He showed early leadership skills, captaining Marrickville West Primary School and later Tempe Intermediate High School. He captained 14-year-olds at the age of 12.

In his early years, Simpson was also a talented golfer, baseballer and soccer player, and was known for being a confident and tenacious competitor. He raised money to buy his first set of golf clubs by collecting lost balls from Marrickville Golf Course and selling them second-hand. Even at a young age, Simpson was known as an unrelenting competitor. He appealed loudly against brother Jack for leg before wicket (lbw) in a club match in spite of a loud edge; the umpire did not hear the favour and upheld the appeal. In a match in 1956, Simpson appealed for lbw against John Shaw after he had been hit in the head by a low bouncer from Pat Crawford, whereas his teammates were busy coming to the aid of the injured batsman. Simpson said "I was a naturally ambitious person anyway and never had any doubts I could go further. It sounds cocky but I always believed in my own talents."

At 12, he was selected for New South Wales in the under-14 competition. He switched to leg spin at the age of thirteen, and a week after turning 15 he was playing for Petersham's first XI in Sydney Grade Cricket after hitting a string of centuries in the under-16 competition.

Simpson had his first taste of first-class cricket as a slips fieldsman, having previously fielded on the boundary. Coming on as 12th man, Keith Miller casually pointed him to the slips, which in that era was against convention, as substitutes were expected to not field in close catching positions. He took two diving catches to establish his position in the cordon.

== First-class debut ==
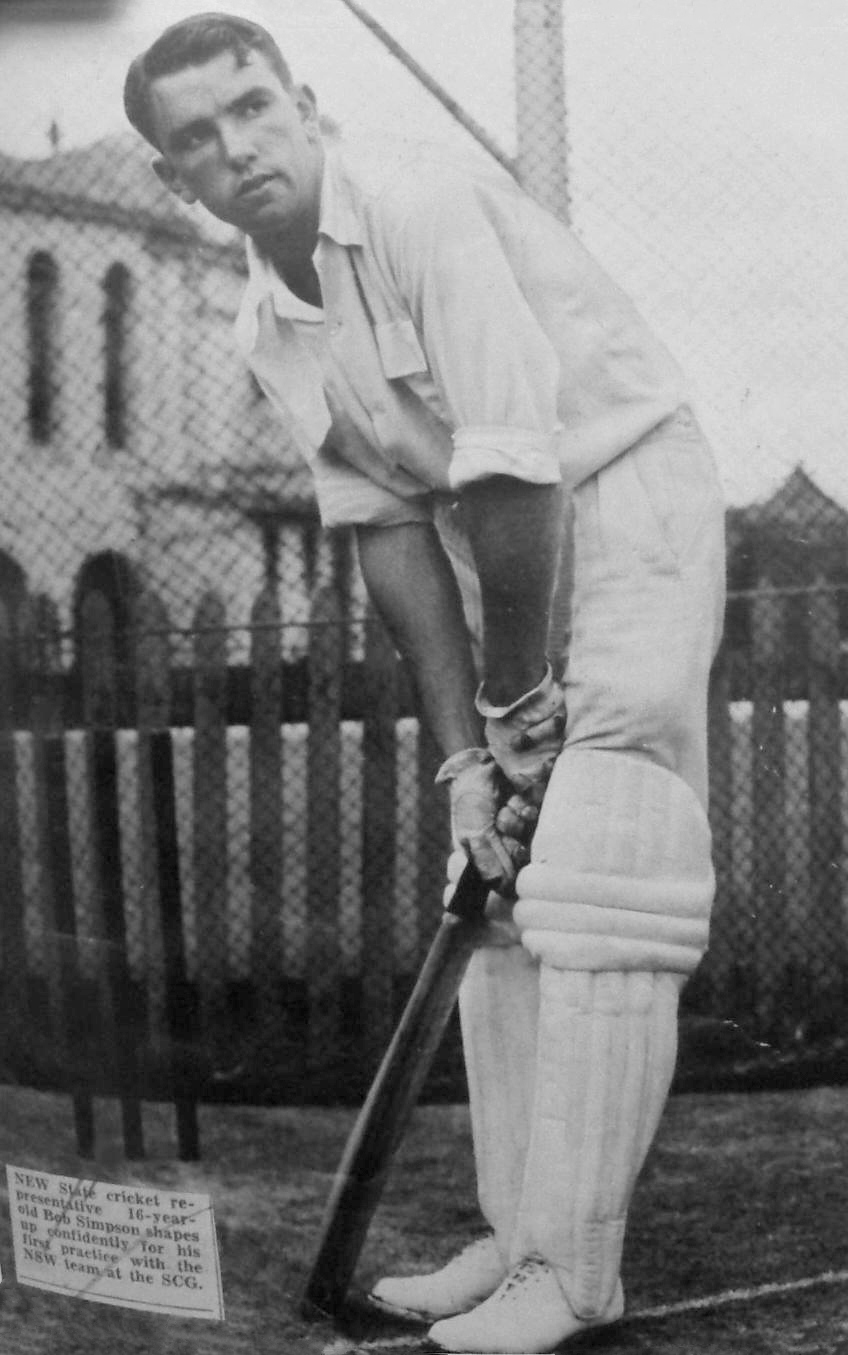
Simpson batting in the nets at the SCG, aged 16, in 1952.

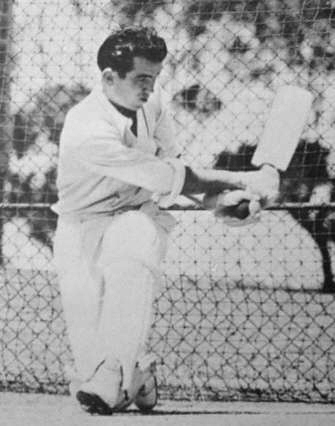
Simpson sweeps in the nets.

He was still 11 days shy of his seventeenth birthday when he was selected to make his Sheffield Shield debut as a middle order batsman for New South Wales against Victoria in the 1952–53 season. He had played only 12 first grade matches prior to this. When he arrived to meet his teammates, Australian vice-captain Arthur Morris asked him where his nappies were. At the age of 16 years and 354 days, this made him the second youngest cricketer to be capped for New South Wales, just three months older than teammate Ian Craig when he made his debut. He scored 44 and 8, without being dismissed in either innings. According to Haigh, "Great protectiveness was felt towards such a boy among men." From the last ball of a drawn match, Simpson attempted to run two, but his misjudgment saw him caught short by half the pitch. Nevertheless, umpire Hugh McKinnon turned down the appeal, and after Victorian captain Sam Loxton reacted angrily, the arbiter said "it's the last ball of the game and his first match". Simpson took his maiden wicket during the match, catching Test player Ian Johnson from his own bowling.

Simpson then scored 69 in the next match against South Australia, his only other innings and match for the season. The 1953–54 season was a purely domestic one, with no international team touring. New South Wales were the strongest state at the time with many Test players and won the first of nine consecutive Sheffield Shield titles, and Simpson found it difficult to break into the team at full strength. He played two matches at the start of the season, and two more at the end of the summer; New South Wales won all of these fixtures except the first, which was drawn. Simpson had few opportunities with the bat because of the strong batting line-up; he was only required to bat six times and his two highest innings of 58 and 42 were ended when New South Wales reached their target, leaving him unbeaten. He ended with 147 runs at 36.75, and had more success with the ball, taking 14 wickets at 27.85. Simpson's bowling was prominent in the last two matches; he took 5/37 in the second innings against Western Australia, bowling four of his victims, and then took 4/38 and 2/83 against South Australia as New South Wales won both matches.

The following season in 1954–55, Simpson had more chances in the New South Wales middle order as the Test players were often playing for Australia against the touring English cricket team. However, he failed to make the use of this, scoring only 123 runs in the first seven innings and was in and out of the team. He then struck form against Victoria, scoring 104 of New South Wales' 234. This was pivotal in a low-scoring match as Victoria made only 86 and 158 and helped New South Wales to a nine-wicket win. Simpson's final match of the season was against the Englishmen. He made six in the first innings as both teams made 172. In the second innings, Simpson reached 98, when light drizzle began to fall and English captain Len Hutton decided to engage in mind games by ordering his men to leave the ground even though the umpires had not adjourned the match. When the visitors returned to the field, Simpson feared another rain delay would stop him reaching his century, so he charged English spinner Johnny Wardle and was stumped. Nevertheless, he helped his state to inflict a rare defeat on Hutton's men; they had won the Tests convincingly 3–1 and had otherwise not been beaten on the tour. The end-of-season run-scoring pushed Simpson's tally for the season to 331 at 33.10; he bowled only in the first two matches of the summer, totalling 1/58.

At the start of the 1955–56 season, Simpson was hit in the nose by a bouncer, forcing him to have two operations. However, he missed only one Shield match against Victoria and played in the remainder of New South Wales' matches, despite the presence of the Test players for the full season, which was purely domestic. Simpson failed to make the most of his opportunities with the bat; in 11 completed innings, he reached 20 on nine occasions, but failed to convert the starts into big scores. His best scores was 79 and 57, and he was dismissed between 20 and 43 seven times. He ended the season with 406 runs at 36.90, and had little success with the ball, taking two wickets at 97.50 at the expensive economy rate of 5.73. Simpson was overlooked for selection for the 1956 tour of England, much to the surprise of English skipper Peter May. Australia lost its third consecutive Ashes tour and in doing so suffered two successive innings defeats, something that it had not suffered for 68 years.

Simpson was under pressure to hold his place in the team, so he moved to Western Australia at the end of the 1955–56 season. At the age of 20, he changed professions from accounting with the Sydney Water Board to journalism, having been given a newspaper editorial post with the Daily News in Perth. During the time, he lived in the house of Fremantle Cricket Club President Bob Ballantine.

== Early international career ==
After the 1956 Ashes series, captain Ian Johnson and vice-captain Keith Miller both retired, creating more openings in a struggling national team. After a slow start for his adopted state, Simpson hit form in December, registering a sequence of 75, 97, 26, 96 and 112 not out, the latter two scores coming in a match against Queensland. Towards the end of the season, Simpson was selected for Lindwall's XI for a match against Harvey's XI. These matches were typically used as a selection trial for the 22 strongest players in the country. Simpson failed to make significant impact, scoring 35 and 10, and he ended the season with 572 runs at 47.66. He had another ineffective summer with the ball, taking two wickets at 95.50.

Simpson was one of many young players—eight of whom were uncapped—selected in an Australian side which toured New Zealand under Ian Craig in 1956–57. Australia was in a rebuilding phase and Test selection was at stake. He scored 263 runs at 43.83 in the first-class matches, including two half-centuries. Simpson played in all three matches against New Zealand, and scored 47, 67, 26 not out, a duck and 8 not out. His 67 was the top-score in the first innings of the second representative match.

In the following season, Simpson was selected for the Test tour of South Africa in 1957–58. Ian Chappell suggests that Simpson was included "mainly for his catching." The young Australian team was derided as the worst to leave Australian shores. In the tour matches leading up to the Tests, Simpson performed consistently. He scored 103 against Transvaal and 53 not out against Eastern Province, and totaled 304 runs at 60.66 in seven matches ahead of the Tests.

Although his form during the Tests was poor, Simpson added 150 against Griqualand West and scored 671 runs at 47.92.

This earned Simpson his debut against South Africa in the First Test at Johannesburg. He compiled 60 in the first innings before being trapped leg before wicket by Hugh Tayfield. He took three catches and scored 23 not out in the second innings. He struggled in the remaining four Tests, with only 53 more runs in the remaining five innings to end with 136 runs at 22.67 in the Tests. His catching form was exceptional, yielding 13 catches in the five Tests and playing a factor in his retention in the team. In all Simpson took 26 catches in 16 matches. He took two wickets at 64.50 in the first-class matches, and managed 6/61 in a non-first-class match against the South African Country Districts.

Unsatisfied with these performances, he sought the advice of vice-captain Neil Harvey, who advised him that he was playing too square on while defending on the back foot.

After his unconvincing performances with the bat in the South African Tests, Simpson needed runs at the start of the 1958–59 season to retain his position in the national team for the Ashes series against England. His first two matches of the season were for Western Australia and a Western Australia Combined XI against the Englishmen, and he scored 60 and 17. In three further Shield matches, he continued his habit of not converting starts into larger scores, registering scores of between 31 and 67 in all six innings with three half-centuries. Up to this point, he had scored 364 runs at 52.00, and Simpson was selected for the Australian XI match against May's Englishmen, effectively a dress rehearsal for the Tests. He failed in both innings with two and a duck, and the hosts were crushed by 345 runs. Simpson was overlooked for selection for the First Test at Brisbane against England. Norm O'Neill, who had scored 1,003 runs at 83.75 in the previous season, while Simpson was in South Africa, took his middle-order position. Peter Burge failed in the First Test, resulting in Simpson's recall for the Second Test at Melbourne. Simpson made a duck in his only innings as Australia won by eight wickets and was subsequently omitted for the remainder of the series. At the time, Australia had three all rounders who were capable with the bat:Ken Mackay, Richie Benaud and Alan Davidson. This meant that Australia needed only five specialist batsmen and in the Fifth Test of the series, only four were used in order to accommodate an extra bowler. Simpson was facing heavy competition for a Test position. Simpson scored 91 runs in four innings in the remainder of the season, which was not enough for him to force his way back into the Test team. It was another sparse summer with the ball for Simpson, who took two wickets at 41.50.

In the Southern Hemisphere winter in 1959, Simpson played a season in the Lancashire League in England as Accrington's professional player, receiving a 950-pound contract. He scored 1,444 runs at 103.14, returning a better statistical analysis than Gary Sobers, and took 47 wickets at 20.82. Simpson's top-score of 122 not out came against Ramsbottom and added another triple-figure score against Bacup, and his season included 11 consecutive fifties including a century, seven of which were unbeaten. In all, he scored two centuries and 14 fifties in 26 innings. He took five-wicket hauls three times with a best of 6/40 against Nelson.

Despite this, Simpson was not selected for the squad for the series against India and Pakistan on the 1959–60 tour of the Indian subcontinent. He started the season with a campaign with a Commonwealth XI in South Africa. In three matches, Simpson continued to suffer problems in converting his starts into large scores. He made 204 runs at 40.80; all his scores were between 31 and 58. He had more success with the ball than in previous seasons, taking five wickets at 19.20.

Simpson returned to Australia, he had a productive period in the Sheffield Shield for Western Australia, rectifying his prior problem of not capitalising on his starts. On the advice of Harvey, he reinvented himself as an opening batsman in an attempt to exploit the opportunity opened by the retirement of Test opener Jimmy Burke. At the start of the 1959–60 Australian season, he scored 98 and took a total of 2/77 in a drawn match against Victoria. In the next match, Simpson broke through for his maiden double-century, posting 236 not out in Western Australia's 4/487 declared against New South Wales. In contrast, Simpson's native state could manage a match total of only 382 in an innings defeat, as he took 1/17 and 5/45. Simpson then made his second double-century in as many innings, posting 230 not out in an innings win against Queensland, more than 57% of his team's runs. His innings of 79 in the draw against South Australia was his lowest score of the season and ended the summer with 98 and 161 not out against New South Wales, carrying his bat in the second innings of a defeat and again scoring the majority of his state's runs for the match. Simpson reflected that "I spent two years turning myself into an overnight success."

These efforts yielded a total of 902 runs at 300.66, and nine wickets at 38.66. He was selected for a non-Test tour of New Zealand by Australia's Second XI, as the first-choice team was still in the subcontinent. Playing as an opener, he scored 418 runs at 69.66 in four representative matches. This included an unbeaten 129 in the third match that guided Australia to an eight-wicket win. During this period, Simpson transformed into a less flamboyant and more solid player who eschewed the hook shot and swayed backwards to avoid short balls. He also took 10 wickets at 27.60 in the international matches, including 4/80 in the second innings of the second fixture.

Just prior to the next Australian season, Simpson was selected for the International Cavaliers team that toured South Africa and Rhodesia. He played in four matches and scored 428 runs at 71.33, including a 178 against Transvaal and 128 against the South African Invitation XI. He took nine wickets at 35.44, including 4/110 against Natal.

== Consolidation ==
=== 1960–61 season ===
In the first match of the new Australian season, Simpson scored 87 out of Western Australia's modest 140 against the touring West Indies. After the visitors collapsed for 97, Simpson then added 221 not out and took a total of 2/69 to help defeat the Caribbeans. He was then selected for an Australian XI in a virtual Test trial against the West Indies, but made only a duck and 17 and took a total of 1/103. In the last two matches before the Tests, against South Australia, Simpson's batting tapered off with 120 runs in four innings, but he was in fine form with the ball, taking a total of 11/206.

Nevertheless, as a result of his strong domestic form, Simpson was recalled to the Test team for the 1960–61 home series against the West Indies, as an opener partnering Colin McDonald. He had a consistent series, scoring 449 runs at 49.44. Simpson figured prominently in the First Test at Brisbane, which was the first Tied Test in history. He scored his highest score to date, 92 in the first innings and took match figures of 3/43, in his first success bowling display at Test level. His first Test wicket was Joe Solomon, hit wicket in the first innings, before removing the batsman again in the second innings. Australia were set 233 for victory and Simpson made a duck. The hosts collapsed to 6/92 before a 134-run stand took them to 6/226 before another late flurry of wickets led to a tie.

Simpson continued his all-round form in the next two Shield matches, taking 11 wickets in total, including a 106 and a match total of 7/87 in a ten-wicket win over Victoria.

He followed this with 49 and 27* as Australia took the series lead with a seven-wicket win in the Second Test in Melbourne. Simpson then scored 70 and 149 for the Tasmania Combined XI in a loss to the West Indians, scoring more than half of the team's runs. After failing to pass 20 as the series was leveled in the Third Test, Simpson contributed 85 in a Fourth Test draw in Adelaide. Simpson saved his best performance for the deciding Test in Melbourne, scoring 75 in the first innings to complement match figures of 3/106. He removed the tourists' leading batsman Garry Sobers in both innings, caught behind by Grout, ending with a total of 3/106 from 36 overs. He had to bowl heavily as captain and front-line leg spinner Richie Benaud was increasingly troubled by a chronic shoulder injury.

Australia was set 258 for victory in the second innings with the series poised at 1–1. Simpson's captain Richie Benaud instructed him to immediately attack West Indian spearhead Wes Hall at the start of run chase. Hall bowled at extreme pace and Simpson was aiming to seize the initiative. He struck four consecutive boundaries and took 18 runs from the first over, hooking and driving. Simpson reached 27 in 14 balls and Hall was withdrawn from the attack, resulting in an ovation from the crowd. Simpson's start enabled Australia to reach 1/57 at stumps before completing a two wicket victory after a middle-order stumble, completing a 2–1 series win. Simpson scored 92, the top score for the match, and finished with 445 runs at 49.44 for the series.

He returned to his native state of New South Wales after 60–61, after four seasons for Western Australia, in which he produced 2470 runs at 79.67. Playing for an assortment of teams in three warm-up matches before heading off for his first Test tour of England, Simpson struck 71, 108, 78 and 30, and took five wickets at 53.60.

=== 1961 Tour of England ===
During the 1961 tour to England, he began his celebrated opening partnership with Bill Lawry, when the Victorian broke into the Australian team. Initially, Simpson was moved into the middle-order so that Lawry could open with McDonald. This occurred after Lawry scored heavily in the tour matches ahead of the Tests, scoring several centuries, whereas Simpson failed to make the most of his starts. In his first six county matches, Simpson reached double figures six times in ten innings. He passed 25 on all six occasions, but only passed fifty once, scoring a 72 against Yorkshire. Simpson struck form in his last two matches before the Tests. Against the Marylebone Cricket Club, which fielded several Test players, he struck an unbeaten 92 in an unbroken 186-run opening stand with Lawry in the second innings to set up a match-winning declaration, and took a total of 4/105 with his leg spin. He then broke through for his maiden first-class ton on English soil, striking 148 in an innings win over Oxford University. He ended the lead-in matches with 569 runs at 52.72 and 17 wickets at 30.05 including 4/13 and 3/56 against Surrey and Lancashire. With Benaud continuing to be hampered by his shoulder, Simpson would often bowl heavily throughout the English summer.

Simpson started well on his return to the Test middle-order scoring 75 in Australia's only innings of 9/516 in the drawn First Test at Edgbaston. He did not bowl in the first innings, but after Benaud's shoulder gave way in the second innings, Simpson sent down 34 overs as a makeshift lead spinner. He struggled against the hosts' batsmen, taking 1/87 and removing Ted Dexter for 180 as the English amassed 4/401 to stave off defeat. With Benaud still injured, he took five wickets in the next two county fixtures, totalling 56 overs. He continued to make starts without going on to complete big scores, compiling three innings between 35 and 65.

Simpson was unable to pass 20 in the next two Tests, which were shared. In the Second Test at Lord's in the absence of Benaud, Simpson took 1/32 from 19 overs in the second innings, removed Ray Illingworth caught at leg slip from a googly immediately after stand-in captain Harvey moved himself to the position. In between these Tests, he struck a 103 against Lancashire. In the Third Test at Headingley, Simpson made two and three and went wicketless as England levelled the series with an eight-wicket win.

He was prominent in the Fourth Test when he started his pairing with Lawry at the top of the order at Old Trafford. An Australian victory would result in a 2–1 lead and the retention of the Ashes. Their first Test stand together was not successful; Simpson fell for four as Australia made only 190. After taking 4/23 in the English first innings, removing Ken Barrington for 78 and cleaning up the tail with three more wickets, despite which England had a first-innings lead of 177. He scored 51 in the second innings in a century stand with Lawry—the first by either team in the series—which allowed Australia to reach set a winning target on the last day. Early on, England appeared destined for the target, as Dexter plundered 21 from Simpson's first four overs. However, the English batsman fell and Simpson did not concede a run in his remaining four overs. He claimed the wicket of Fred Trueman as England collapsed to be all out for 201 on the final afternoon to cede the Ashes. After the triumph at Old Trafford, Simpson had a run of heavy-scoring in the county matches before the final Test, scoring 116, 132 and 6, and 160, ending unbeaten in all but the last innings, against Glamorgan, Warwickshire and Yorkshire. He added a further 3/21 and 3/48 in the last of these matches, although the hosts still managed to hang on for a draw.

Aside from the effort at Manchester, Simpson's Test series was otherwise unproductive, with 191 runs at 23.88 and seven wickets at 32.71. He finished with 40 in a drawn Fifth Test at the Oval. After the Tests, Simpson continued his habit of not converting his starts into large totals, making five consecutive scores between 20 and 62 before scoring 121 in his final first-class innings of the season against TN Pearce's XI. He was also punished by opposition batsmen in the last three matches in England, conceding a century in an innings three times, including a 1/139 from only 15 overs in the second innings against Pearce's XI.

=== 1961–62 season ===
The 1961–62 season was purely domestic and Simpson returned to his native state as they completed a ninth consecutive Sheffield Shield win. New South Wales won six of their eight matches, of which Simpson played in all. He recorded solid results without being spectacular, with an unbeaten 110 in addition to five half-centuries, although two of these were not out. He saved his best performance for the two wins over arch-rivals Victoria. He scored 110 and took a total of 4/99 in the first match. In the second match, he contributed in each innings. After taking 3/66 as Victoria batted first, he scored 95 to help New South Wales take a 63-run lead. Simpson then took 3/31 in the second innings and made an unbeaten 67 as his native state cantered to a ten-wicket win. He removed Lawry twice in the two matches. Apart from the ten wickets against the Victorians, Simpson had little success with the ball totalling 13 wickets at 42.30. He aggregated 636 runs at 48.92 for the Shield campaign. At the end of the season, Simpson was part of an International XI that toured New Zealand and played against local teams as well as outfits from Pakistan and India. In five matches, he hit three centuries, including two 167s, and three half-centuries, all of which were undefeated to end with 663 runs at 132.60. His bowling was less successful, with 11 wickets at 46.63.

=== 1962–63 season ===
Simpson started the 1962–63 season looking to rectify the disparity between his prolific run-scoring at first-class level and his modest returns in the international arena. He started the Australian summer in fine form, scoring a century in each of his four games ahead of the Tests against Dexter's touring Englishmen. Three of these centuries—109 and 66 not out, 130 and 9, and 110—came in matches against the English visitors. His bowling against the tourists was not as effective totalling 4/239.

Simpson started solidly in the international matches, scoring twin half centuries in the drawn First Test in Brisbane, although he was punished with the ball, registering 1/100 from 25 overs. After Australia went 1–0 down in Melbourne, Simpson totalling 52 and going wicketless, Simpson produced a match-winning all round performance in the Third Test in front of his home crowd in Sydney to help Australia level the series. On a dry surface where almost the entire square was devoid of grass, Simpson took his Test best innings haul of 5/57, removing specialist batsmen Colin Cowdrey and Geoff Pullar after they had been set, and then cleaning up the tail to restrict England to 279. He then scored 91 to help Australia accumulate a first-innings lead of 40. England were then dismissed in their second innings for 104, leaving a victory target of just 65. Simpson made an aggressive unbeaten 34, with English captain Ted Dexter plundered for 27 runs in his three overs. A storm hit the ground and stayed for two days just after Australia reached the target, which could have washed out the match and saved England. As the last two Tests were drawn, this was the difference between Australia retaining and losing the Ashes. Simpson was not prominent in the last two matches. He scored 71 in the second innings of the Fourth Test but made 32 and two ducks in the other innings, and took a total of 2/163 in the last two Tests, conceding more than four runs per over. He ended the series with 401 runs at 44.56 and eight wickets at 46.13. Simpson continued to be prolific away from the Tests, scoring 205 against Western Australia in a Shield match. Simpson took a total of 22 wickets for the season.

== Captaincy ==
New South Welshmen and senior Test players Neil Harvey and Alan Davidson retired at the end of the 1962–63 season, with Simpson being elevated to the vice-captaincy of both NSW and Australia (under Richie Benaud) at the start of the 1963–64 season.

In his first innings of the season, Simpson made his highest first-class score of 359, against Queensland, scoring more than half of his team's 661 in an innings win. Playing for a Western Australia Combined XI against the touring South Africans at Perth, Simpson and Benaud combined for a 237-run partnership in the second innings, with Simpson making 246, having scored only four in the first innings. In the next match for New South Wales against Western Australia, Simpson hit an unbeaten 247 as Benaud's men amassed 1/425 declared. Up to this point he had scored 856 runs at 285.33 for the season in four innings. In the second innings, he was dropped down the order to allow other players an opportunity, and he was not required to bat as New South Wales reached their target of 262 with nine wickets in hand. However, Simpson's form peaked ahead of the Tests. He made 41 in his next four innings in tour matches against the South Africans ahead of the Tests, including three scores of no more than one.

The First Test against South Africa at Brisbane was drawn and is remembered for the no-balling of Ian Meckiff, which ended his career as Benaud refused to bowl him again. Simpson scored 12 and 34 and took a solitary wicket. After the game, Benaud injured himself in a grade match so Simpson captained NSW for the first time and scored 135 against Victoria.

A few days later in the Second Test at Melbourne, with Benaud still absent, Simpson led Australia for the first time. Simpson's appointment to the top job raised eyebrows in some quarters, as he had a reputation for being abrasive, and others had been more successful and experienced at domestic level. Lawry had led Victoria to the Sheffield Shield in 1962–63 and Western Australia's Barry Shepherd had also been praised for his aggressive and bold leadership. At the time Simpson had scored only 1246 runs at 32.78 and taken 22 wickets at 39.40 in 23 Tests and had not scored a century.

Simpson was leading an inexperienced team with Benaud, Harvey and Davidson all gone; only Wally Grout and himself remained from the Tied Test team three years earlier.

He scored a duck and 55 not out, being at the crease as Australia scored the winning runs to take a 1–0 lead in the series. Benaud then informed the Australian Cricket Board {later Cricket Australia} that he would be retiring at season's end, so it was arranged for Benaud to return to the team and play under Simpson to give the latter experience for the forthcoming tour of England. Australia lost the Fourth Test heavily by ten wickets, the other two matches were drawn, and the series finished 1–1. Simpson scored half-centuries in both the Third and Fourth Tests and ended the series with 361 runs at 40.11 average. His combination with Lawry consistently propelled Australia to solid starts, posting at least 50 in each of their opening stands. However, he continued to be plagued by an inability to convert his starts into large scores at the highest level of competition. He passed 25 in 8 of his 10 innings for the series, but could only manage three fifties. As a captain, Simpson was less willing to bowl, taking only two wickets for the Test series, and only four wickets in seven first-class matches since taking up the top job.

Despite his heavy scoring at first-class level, Simpson was yet to hit a Test century when he arrived with his team in England in 1964. After making a slow start to the tour and not passing 31 in his first four innings, Simpson struck form after the first week of May. He passed 50 in seven consecutive innings, making 125 against Somerset, 138 and 55 against Surrey, 57 against Glamorgan, 95 against Cambridge University, and 105 and 52—both not out—in a nine-wicket win over the MCC. He augmented this with 4/48 against Surrey.

The first three Tests continued Simpson's frustrating personal run in Test cricket. He made 50 in the First Test at Trent Bridge, but did not pass 30 in the next two Tests, twice falling after reaching 20. Australia led 1–0 after winning the Third Test at Headingley.

Arriving for the Fourth Test at Old Trafford, Australia required only to draw to retain the Ashes, because a win for England in the final Fifth Test would yield a 1–1 series draw. Simpson hit form in the three county matches leading up to the Test at Manchester, scoring 117 against Leicestershire and scoring fifties in the last three innings. He had also taken eight wickets in four innings.

On a flat, batsman-friendly pitch, Simpson won the toss and elected to bat. Having scored more than 40 first-class centuries, he was still looking for his first Test ton. Simpson's plan was to bat as long as possible to ensure that defeat would be avoided and the Ashes retained. Simpson and Lawry gave Australia an ideal start with a solid opening partnership, which yielded 201 runs, before Lawry was run out for 106. Simpson then slowly progressed through the 90s before reaching his first Test century. Speaking of his relief at reaching the milestone, Simpson recalled "I don't know of any player who was on the international scene as long as I without scoring a century. I was feeling a bit silly about it by this stage." Simpson continued on his quest of batting England out of the game. Following the dismissal of Ian Redpath (19), Norm O'Neill (47) and Peter Burge (34), Brian Booth went about building the sixth-wicket partnership on the second day. Simpson combined in another double century stand, 219, before Booth was out for 98. Simpson was 265 at the close of play, and resumed Australia's innings. This time, he was in an aggressive mood, scoring a further 46 runs in 40 minutes before being dismissed for 311, which was later equalled by Hashim Amla of South Africa who made 311 not out|* Australia declared at 8/656. Simpson's 13-hour innings was the longest by an Australian at first-class level. He joined Don Bradman as the second Australian to have made a Test triple century in England. Bob Simpson became only the second man in cricket history to score a triple ton as his first Test century, the other being Sir Garfield Sobers. Later in December 2016, an Indian cricketer Karun Nair, joined this elite club when he scored 303 not out, as his maiden century against England at the M. A. Chidambaram Stadium in Chennai.

Simpson's safety-first approach was severely criticised. The Daily Mail called it the "murder of Test cricket": at one stage, six journalists in the press box were seen to be sleeping while he was batting. Simpson defended his tactics, asserting that with a series lead, batting England out of the match was the best way to retain the Ashes. The tactic paid off as the match ended in a high-scoring draw and the Ashes were retained. Another draw in the Fifth Test at The Oval, in which Simpson scored 24, ensured that Australia won the series 1–0. Despite a persistent thumb injury, Simpson scored 458 runs at 76.33 in the five Tests, and 1,714 runs (including five centuries) for the tour. Apart from their double century effort at Old Trafford, Simpson and Lawry passed 50 for the opening wicket on only one occasion. Simpson took his career-best innings bowling figures during the tour, claiming 5/33 against Glamorgan.

During the tour, Simpson drew attention for a possible breach of the Australian Cricket Board's rules on players writing about cricket. Simpson had been given permission to write in London's Daily Express, but his columns were syndicated in Australian newspapers. However, the board cleared Simpson of any wrongdoing.

Australia then made a brief tour of the subcontinent during their return voyage, playing three Tests against India and one against Pakistan. These were played consecutively, with no other tour matches. Simpson continued his consistent performances, scoring 292 runs at 48.67 with three half-centuries in a 1–1 drawn series against India. His best performance was at the drawn Third Test at Eden Gardens in Calcutta where he scored 67 and 71 and took 4/45. India levelled the series with a narrow two-wicket win in the Second Test after Australia won the First by 139 runs. On the spinning tracks of India, Simpson bowled himself more often, ending with six wickets at 25.17, including a 4/45 in the first innings of the Third Test, as well as taking eight catches. At Karachi, Simpson struck 153 and 115 against Pakistan in a drawn Test to become the third captain to hit two centuries in the same Test. He ended the calendar year of 1964 with 1,381 Test runs, setting a world record aggregate.

In 1964–65, Simpson led Australia on a tour of the Caribbean, which was marred by controversies over umpiring standards and the legality of West Indian Charlie Griffith's bowling action. To make life more difficult, some of the grounds had no sightscreens, making it even harder to see the ball. Griffith also dragged his foot, bringing him around a metre closer to the batsman before releasing his balls at extreme pace. Simpson initially struggled against Griffith, failing to pass 30 in the first three Tests as Australia conceded a 0–2 lead. He scored only 87 in five innings, but had success with the ball, capturing 4/83 in the second innings of the Second Test at Trinidad. Adjusting his technique, Simpson scored 201 in the Fourth Test at Barbados, where he set an Australian record opening stand of 382 with Lawry. The match was drawn, but Australia managed a consolation win in the Fifth Test, to which Simpson contributed 72 and 34 not out. His average for 399 runs was 49.88 and he took 11 catches. Simpson made his displeasure regarding Griffith known to the Australian board, and this was relayed to the West Indian administrators.

== International twilight ==
Simpson's appearances during the 1965–66 Ashes series were intermittent. He missed the First Test due to a broken wrist, which ended in a draw under the leadership of Booth. He returned for the Second Test at Melbourne, scoring a half-century in both innings of a drawn match. Chickenpox forced him to miss the Third Test, which Australia lost by an innings. It was the first time that Australia had lost by an innings since 1956, and the selectors responded by dropping four players including Booth. On his return for the Fourth Test at Adelaide Simpson made 225, making 244 runs in 255 minutes with Lawry, the highest opening stand by Australia against England and still the highest against England in Australia. Australia claimed a decisive innings victory to level the series and a draw in the Fifth Test allowed Australia to retain the Ashes. Simpson topped the batting averages with 355 runs at 88.75 average.

In 1966–67, Simpson's captaincy was widely criticised when Australia were soundly defeated 1–3 during the tour of South Africa. The series started well for Simpson as he scored 65, 48, 153 and 18 and took eight wickets in the first two Tests at Johannesburg and Cape Town. The series was level after the two matches. However, Australia's performances fell away thereafter, and Simpson 's 94 in the Third Test at Durban was his only other contribution above 40. For the second time, Simpson was ardent in his criticism of the local umpiring during a major tour.

During the 1967–68 series against India, Simpson's all-round performances were exceptional. He scored 55 and 103 in the First Test at Adelaide, then scored 109 and took 4/49 in the Second Test at Melbourne. Australia won both Tests, the second by an innings. After deciding that he would retire at the end of the season, Simpson was omitted for the Third Test so that other players could have international experience before the 1968 tour of England. Simpson returned to the team for the Fourth Test at Sydney in front of his home crowd. In his international farewell, he played under the captaincy of Lawry. Simpson recorded his best Test match figures of 3/39 and 5/99, and claimed five catches in another Australian victory. His final series yielded 294 runs (at 58.80 average), 13 wickets at 16.38 and seven catches.

== Retirement and comeback ==
Retired from Test cricket, Simpson toured England in 1968 as a member of the press gallery and later worked in public relations. He looked after promotion and marketing earnings for cricketers in an era where they struggled to survive financially. During the 1975–76 season, he had organised for both Australian and West Indian players to market shampoo and deodorant, and he helped to find sponsors for the Australian team. He also called for the revival of the Cavaliers XI concept to boost the popularity of cricket. He wrote a book titled Captain's Story, in which he expressed his anger against bowlers that he believed to have bowled with an illegal action. His former teammate Ian Meckiff took issue with the contents and sued for libel. After five years of litigation, Simpson settled out of court and apologised to Meckiff.

When Test cricket was devastated by the breakaway World Series Cricket in 1977, Simpson made a comeback after a decade in retirement to captain New South Wales and Australia at the age of 41. All of Australia's first-choice players had defected apart from Jeff Thomson. Simpson had been playing for Western Suburbs in Sydney Grade Cricket but had not been playing at first-class level for a decade.

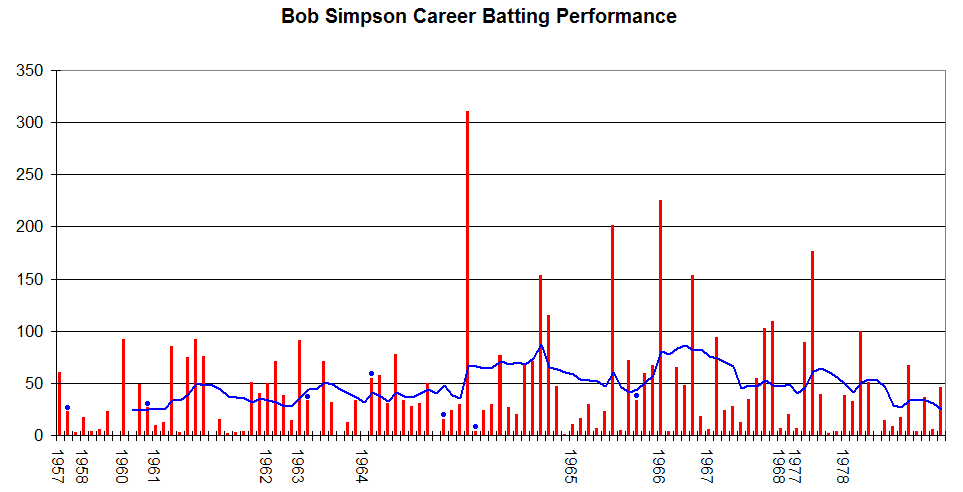
Bob Simpson's career performance graph.

His first assignment was a five Test series against India, and Simpson began where he left off a decade earlier. He top-scored with 89 in the second innings of the First Test in Brisbane, before scoring 176 and 39 as Australia won in Perth. Simpson failed to pass double figures in the Third Test in Melbourne, and made 30s in both innings in Sydney, as the Indians won two consecutive Tests to level the series. Simpson responded with 100 and 51 in the deciding Fifth Test in Adelaide as Australia scraped to a 3–2 series victory. Simpson totalled 539 runs at 53.90 and took four wickets.

He then led Australia on a tour of the West Indies, then the strongest team in the world. He made only one half century, 67 in the Third Test in Georgetown, Guyana. It was the only Test that Australia won in a 3–1 series loss. He had a disappointing series scoring 199 runs at 22.11 and taking seven wickets at 52.28. Simpson wanted to continue playing Tests as Australia hosted Mike Brearley's Englishmen in 1978–79. His players wanted him to continue, but the Australian Cricket Board voted him out and installed Graham Yallop as the skipper. During his comeback, he had accumulated his 60th first-class century against Barbados during the Caribbean tour and become the oldest Australian to score a Test century on home soil.

Simpson retired after the tour at the age of 42. He had scored 5,317 runs for New South Wales at 53.17. In Sydney Grade Cricket, he scored 10,111 runs at 61.65 and took 186 wickets at 23.62.

== Playing style ==
In his prime Simpson was known for his technical correctness. At slightly below average height, his noted ability to bat for long periods was attributed to his high fitness and concentration levels. He had a wide array of shots, in particular off the back foot. Along with Bill Lawry, he formed an opening partnership that was regarded as one of the finest in Test history. Simpson was fast between the wickets, and the pair were especially well known for their understanding, as exemplified by their fluency in rotating the strike with quick singles. Simpson's stance was easy and his style attractive, the result of a change of technique in the late 1950s when he turned from playing too square-on to side-on. Simpson found that it made all the difference to him in dealing effectively with the in-dipper and going-away balls. Standing 179 cm and weighing 83 kilograms (13 st), Simpson was most effective as an attacking batsman. Simpson was best known for his straight-drive and powerfully hit square-cut, as well as an on-drive taken from his toes. He rarely played the hook shot, regarding it as risky, and used the pull shot in moderation. Early in his career, Simpson had a square-on stance but converted to a more side on position, finding it easier to deal with swing bowling.

As a bowler, Simpson had a heavy dependence on the leg-break, noting that his overuse of the googly often lead to erratic performance. He was regularly used at Test level as an occasional leg spin bowler, averaging more than one wicket per Test, and twice taking five wickets in an innings. He totalled 349 wickets at 38.07 in 247 first-class matches, including six five wicket hauls. A fine slips fielder, he was regarded as the best of his era, and was fast enough to catch flies with his hands. He took 110 catches, setting a world record in Tests. His rate of 0.94 catches per inning remains the highest of any non-wicketkeeper fielder. As Australia's Test captain, Simpson was described by Gideon Haigh as having "flint in his fibre" and a "drill sergeant among skippers". Simpson had a strong belief in discipline, work ethic and the subordination of the individual to the needs of the team. When he later returned as coach of the Australian team when it was going through a barren run in the mid-1980s, he gained a reputation for being a disciplinarian coach who raised fitness and fielding standards to a higher level. His methods sometimes caused conflict with players, but by his retirement in 1996, Australia had regained its position as the world's leading Test nation.

== Coaching career ==
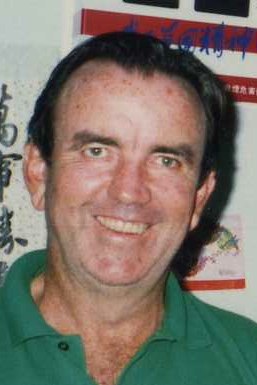
Simpson as coach of Australia

In 1986, Simpson took over as coach of an Australian team which was young, demoralised and regarded as soft. A considerable turnover of players due to constant failure in the past eighteen months had seen the likes of Steve Waugh, David Boon, Dean Jones, Craig McDermott and Geoff Marsh all make their debuts under captain Allan Border. Prior to his first series, the tour of New Zealand, Australia had not won a series for two years. In that period they managed three wins, 11 losses and eight draws. His appointment bore little initial fruit. They won none of their eleven Tests in 1986, and lost three. By the end of the 1986–87 Australian season, Australia had only won two of their last 22 Tests, and none of their last 14. They had gone three years without winning a Test series.

The 1987 Cricket World Cup heralded the start of more prosperous times for Australian cricket. Rank outsiders, Australia defeated hosts India by one run in the opening match, and New Zealand twice by three and 17 runs respectively. They capitalised on these hard fought wins to take five victories from their six-round robin matches. They then defeated Pakistan by 18 runs after inducing a late collapse in the semifinal, and then claimed the title by seven runs with a similar late surge over England in the final. The success spilled into the Test arena, with the 1987–88 home season yielding saw Australia's first Test series victory for four years, with a 1–0 series victory over New Zealand. The season was completed with one-off Tests against England and Sri Lanka respectively, which ended in a draw and win respectively.

The 1988–89 season began with a tour of Pakistan. Australia were unable to end the 29 year streak without a win on Pakistani soil, 1–0. Simpson and Border were criticised for their outspoken criticism of the umpiring and doctored pitches. It was typical of the hard nosed approach they had brought to the team, with Border being given the epithet "Captain Grumpy".

Simpson was unable to guide his team past the dominant West Indies, who toured Australia in 1988–89 and took a 3–1 Test series victory, but he was able to regain the Ashes with a 4–0 result on the 1989 tour, which also saw opener Mark Taylor establish himself as a Test match player; Taylor later became captain under Simpson.

The 1989–90 Australian season saw further growth, as the Australia played one, two and three Tests against New Zealand, Sri Lanka and Pakistan respectively. Simpson's men won a Test each against Sri Lanka and Pakistan, while the others were drawn. It was the first Australian season in six years where they were undefeated. The 1990–91 season saw another comfortable Ashes series win, 3–0. Early 1991 saw a five Test tour of the West Indies, the first since the heavy 3–0 defeat in 1983. Australia had improved, managing a 2–1 loss. The 1991–92 Australian season saw a heavy 4–0 win in a five Test series over India, but was marred by Australia's ignominious 1992 Cricket World Cup campaign on home soil. The pre-tournament favourites, they were eliminated in the group stages, coming fifth. The 1992–93 saw another tour to Australia by the West Indies, the only team against which Simpson was yet to record a series victory as coach. After taking a 1–0 series lead into the Fourth Test, Simpson's team lost by one run, failing to seal the Frank Worrell Trophy. This left the series to be decided in the Fifth Test at the WACA Ground in Perth, a ground at which the West Indies had then never lost a Test match. Australia were unable to regroup and succumbed to the pace of the West Indies, whose fast bowling was enhanced by the bouncy surface of the pitch. Australia collapsed from 1/58 in the first innings to be dismissed for 119, with Curtly Ambrose taking a spell of 7/1. Australia were crushed by an innings within three days, and victory over the Caribbeans again eluded them. 1993 saw a return to England for another Ashes tour. Australia won the series 4–1, and returned home to claim the Trans Tasman Trophy with a comfortable 2–0 victory over New Zealand at home in late 1993. This was followed by two drawn series, home and away against South Africa, the first competition between the teams post-apartheid. At the end of the 1993–94 Border retired. The four previous seasons had seen the team strengthening introductions of Mark Waugh, Shane Warne, Michael Slater and Glenn McGrath in each of the respective seasons. The Waugh brothers, along with Taylor, Slater and Boon were to be the core of Australia's batting lineup which was to re-establish the nation at the top of international cricket in the following years. Warne revived leg spin, believed to be the dying art, and was to become the leading wicket-taker in Test history, while McGrath became the leading wicket-taking fast bowler in Test history.

With Taylor taking over as captain, Australia headed to Pakistan in late 1994. Despite having the ascendancy for most of the First Test, they lost by one wicket, and after two high scoring draws in which they held the initiative, Australia suffered a 1–0 series loss, still unable to win a match in Pakistan since 1959. Australia then took a 3–1 home Ashes series victory in 1994–95, and then finally reclaimed the Frank Worrell Trophy with a 2–1 series win in the Caribbean in mid-1995, thereby establishing themselves as the leading Test team in the world. After the match, Taylor took the winning cricket ball to Simpson, who at the time was recovering from a blood clot in his leg.

After 2–1 and 3–0 series win over Pakistan and Sri Lanka at home in 1995–96, Simpson made his coaching swan song at the 1996 Cricket World Cup on the Indian subcontinent, where Australia overcame a forfeit to Sri Lanka in the group phase due to a Tamil Tiger bombing. After narrow wins over New Zealand and the West Indies in the quarter and semifinals, they lost in the final to Sri Lanka.

India had appointed Bob Simpson as consultant for the 1999 cricket World Cup.

== Later coaching career ==
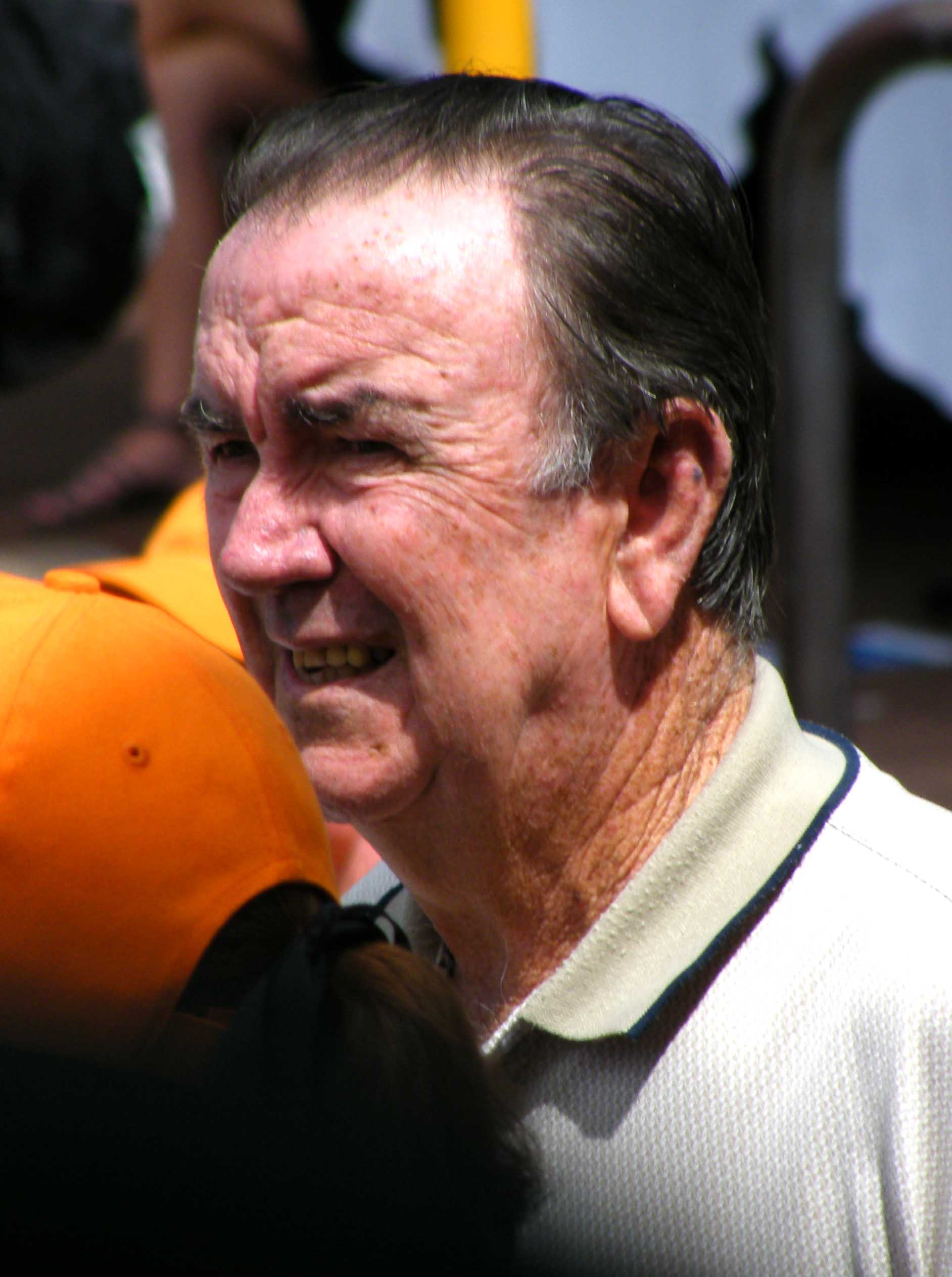
Simpson during 2009 Women's cricket World Cup

He coached Lancashire for two years, ending in September 2001. Earlier, he had coached Leicestershire. His insistence on hard work was less successful in England, and was often speculated to be due to a difference in psychology in the two countries.

In late 2004, Simpson accepted a three-year contract to act as a cricket advisor to Rajasthan in the Ranji Trophy. He had served as a consultant to the Indian cricket team in the late 1990s.

In the early 2000s, Simpson was part of the International Cricket Council's committee for dealing with throwing. In 2004, he condemned the ICC, claiming that it was soft on illegal bowling actions and that the number of illegitimate bowlers was at an all-time high. He asserted that officials were reluctant to crack down on high-profile bowlers with dubious actions, saying that it was encouraging young players to mimic their actions.

Simpson was a traditionalist coach, tending to emphasise the fundamentals of batting, bowling and fielding. He criticised the 21st-century style of coaching, which has increasingly used computer technology, biomechanics and science to recommend playing techniques, stating that it had verged into "computers for computers' sake". He also coached the Netherlands national cricket team, overseeing a successful ICC Trophy campaign which saw them qualify for the 2007 Cricket World Cup. Simpson called for the Netherlands to be incorporated into the English domestic league so that they could gain more experience.

== Death ==
Simpson died on 16 August 2025, at the age of 89.

== Honours ==
Simpson was a Wisden Cricketer of the Year in 1965 and inducted into the Sport Australia Hall of Fame in 1985. He was inducted into the Australian Cricket Hall of Fame in 2006 and the ICC Cricket Hall of Fame in 2013.

He was appointed a Member of the Order of Australia (AM) in the 1978 Birthday Honours for services to cricket, and promoted to Officer of the same order (AO) in the 2007 Australia Day Honours "for service to cricket as a coach at state, national and international levels, as a consultant, particularly in countries where cricket is an emerging sport, and through contributions to revision of the laws of cricket." He received an Australian Sports Medal in 2000 and a Centenary Medal in 2001.

== Notes ==
Sporting positions
Preceded by Richie Benaud	Australian Test cricket captains 1963/4–1965/6	Succeeded by Brian Booth
Preceded by Brian Booth	Australian Test cricket captains 1965/6–1965/6	Succeeded by Brian Booth
Preceded by Brian Booth	Australian Test cricket captains 1965/6–1967/8	Succeeded by Bill Lawry
Preceded by Greg Chappell	Australian Test cricket captains 1977/8	Succeeded by Graham Yallop
