= Rajendra Shah (cricketer) =

Indian cricketer (1950–2018)

Personal information
- Born: 1950
- Died: 28 September 2018 (aged 68)
- Source: Cricinfo, 10 October 2018

Rajendra Shah (1950 – 28 September 2018) was an Indian cricketer. He played in five first-class cricket matches for Saurashtra in the Ranji Trophy between 1971 and 1976.

== See also ==
- List of Saurashtra cricketers
