= V.L. Nakum =

Indian cricketer (1924–1997)

V.L.Nakum
Personal information
- Full name: Vajesingh Laxman Nakum
- Born: 16 October 1924; Rajkot, Gujarat, British India
- Died: 9 June 1997 (aged 72); Rajkot, Gujarat, India
- Batting: Right-handed
- Bowling: Right-arm medium

Career statistics
Competition	First-class
Matches	25
Runs scored	976
Batting average	22.18
100s/50s	1/5
Top score	101
Balls bowled	940
Wickets	8
Bowling average	65.62
5 wickets in innings	0
10 wickets in match	0
Best bowling	3/54
Catches/stumpings	7/0
- Source: ESPNcricinfo, 28 May 2020

Vajesingh Laxman Nakum (1924–1997) was a first class cricketer from India, who played for Saurashtra. He made his debut in 1945–46 season and played his last first class match in 1962–63 season.

His uncles, Amar Singh and L.Ramji represented India at test match level.
