= Suresh Vaghjiani =

Indian cricketer

Suresh Vaghjiani (26 August 1945 – 2004) was an Indian cricketer. He was a right-handed batsman and right-arm medium-fast bowler who played for Saurashtra. He was born in Jamnagar.

Vaghjiani made a single first-class appearance for the side, during the 1963–64 season, against Baroda. From the lower order, he scored 2 runs in the first innings in which he batted, and a duck in the second.

Vaghjiani bowled 9 overs in the match, conceding 25 runs.
