= Ian Craig =

Australian cricketer

Ian Craig OAM
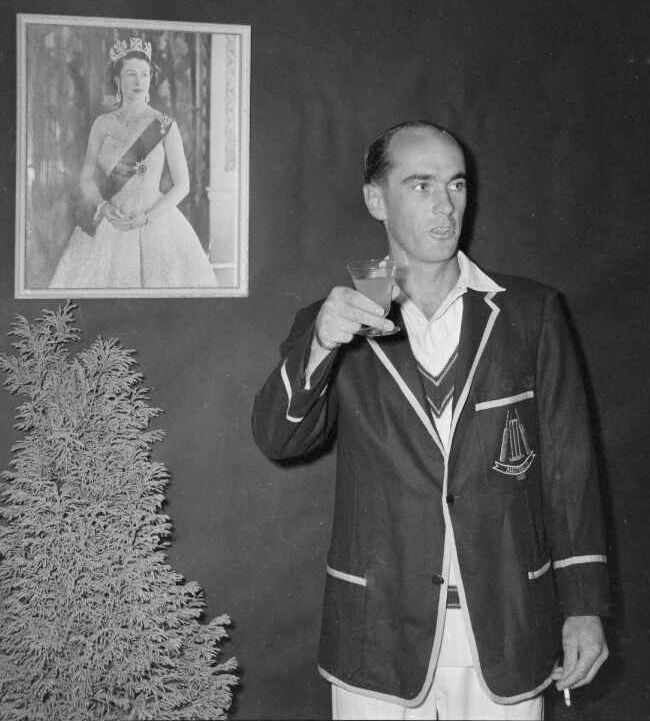
- Craig in New Zealand in 1960

Personal information
- Full name: Ian David Craig
- Born: 12 June 1935; Yass, New South Wales, Australia
- Died: 16 November 2014 (aged 79); Bowral, New South Wales, Australia
- Nickname: The Colt
- Height: 1.73 m (5 ft 8 in)
- Batting: Right-handed
- Role: Batsman

International information
- National side: Australia
- Test debut (cap 194): 6 February 1953 v South Africa
- Last Test: 28 February 1958 v South Africa

Domestic team information
- Years: Team
- 1951/52–1961/62: New South Wales

Career statistics
Competition	Test	First-class
Matches	11	144
Runs scored	358	7,328
Batting average	19.88	37.96
100s/50s	0/2	15/38
Top score	53	213*
Balls bowled	–	130
Wickets	–	1
Bowling average	–	130.00
5 wickets in innings	–	0
10 wickets in match	–	0
Best bowling	–	1/3
Catches/stumpings	2/–	70/–
- Source: CricInfo, 7 April 2008

Ian David Craig OAM (12 June 1935 – 16 November 2014) was an Australian cricketer who represented the Australian national team in 11 Tests between 1953 and 1958. A right-handed batsman, Craig holds the records for being the youngest Australian to make a first-class double century, appear in a Test match, and captain his country in a Test match. Burdened by the public expectation of being the "next Bradman", Craig's career did not fulfil its early promise. In 1957, he was appointed Australian captain, leading a young team as part of a regeneration plan following the decline of the national team in the mid-1950s, but a loss of form and illness forced him out of the team after one season. Craig made a comeback, but work commitments forced him to retire from first-class cricket at only 26 years of age.

A teenage prodigy, Craig made his first-class debut for New South Wales in the last match of the 1951–52 Australian season, aged only 16. The following summer, Craig earned comparisons to Don Bradman, generally regarded as the greatest batsman of all time, after becoming the youngest player to score a first-class double century, an unbeaten 213 against the touring South African team. The innings secured Craig's Test debut in the final match against South Africa, making him the youngest male player to represent Australia in a Test, aged 17 years and 239 days. Craig started his Test career well, scoring 53 and 47 to ensure his selection for the 1953 Ashes tour, making him the youngest Australian player to tour England. Craig's arrival precipitated media comparisons to the arrival and success of Bradman in 1930, but he performed poorly and was not selected for any of the Tests.

Having missed a season due to national service and university studies, Craig returned to first-class cricket in 1955–56, earning a place in the 1956 Ashes touring squad. Craig regained a Test position for the final two Tests of the series. After the series, at which point Australia had suffered three consecutive Ashes series defeats, captain Ian Johnson and vice-captain Keith Miller retired. The selectors focussed on young players to rebuild the team, appointing Craig as the captain for the 1957–58 tour of South Africa, although he had played just six Tests and was not an established member of the team. Aged 22 years and 194 days, Craig was, at the time, the youngest captain in Test history and led a team that critics dismissed as having no chance to a convincing 3–0 victory; his own batting form was poor, and he averaged less than 20. He contracted hepatitis before the start of the 1958–59 season and withdrew from cricket. Although he returned the following season for New South Wales, he could not regain his Test place. He retired from first-class cricket at the age of just 26: work commitments as a pharmacist increasingly restricted his ability to train. In later life, Craig was the managing director of the Australian subsidiary of the British pharmaceutical firm Boots. He had a continued involvement with cricket as an administrator, working with the New South Wales Cricket Association, the Sydney Cricket Ground Trust and the Bradman Museum. Craig was awarded the Medal of the Order of Australia in 1997 for his service to cricket.

== Early life ==
=== Birth and school success ===
Ian Craig was the first son of John Craig and his wife Katherine (née Dun). Shortly after Ian's birth in the rural town of Yass, John jokingly told friends that "Australia's second Don Bradman has just been born." When John's employers, the Bank of New South Wales, moved him to Sydney, the family relocated when Ian was just three; John went on to be the chief manager of the Sydney office. Ian studied at North Sydney Boys High School, and showed an aptitude for ball games from an early age. He was a member of Australia's schoolboy baseball team for three years, first playing at 13 years of age. He captained his school's rugby union team and was a member of the state's schoolboy team, but was only vice captain of the First XI cricket team behind Peter Philpott, another future Test player. At the time, cricket was only his third priority; his obituary in the Sydney Morning Herald suggests that he was initially a better rugby player but was persuaded to focus on cricket when he broke his jaw playing rugby. He joined Mosman Cricket Club on Sydney's North Shore and scored a first-grade century at the age of 16. Craig was not coached heavily; the philosophy of the day was to supervise young players and to only intervene if mistakes were being made.

After good performances for Mosman, Craig was selected to make his first-class debut for New South Wales at the age of 16 years and 249 days, during the 1951–52 season, making him the youngest ever Sheffield Shield player. He struck 91 against South Australia in his only first-class innings of the season, before falling leg before wicket. He remained in the team for the following season; in the first eight games he scored 350 runs at an average of 35.00, with three fifties. Given a chance to push his claims for Test selection after being selected for the Australian XI to play South Africa, he made only 38 and 11.

=== The "Next Bradman" ===
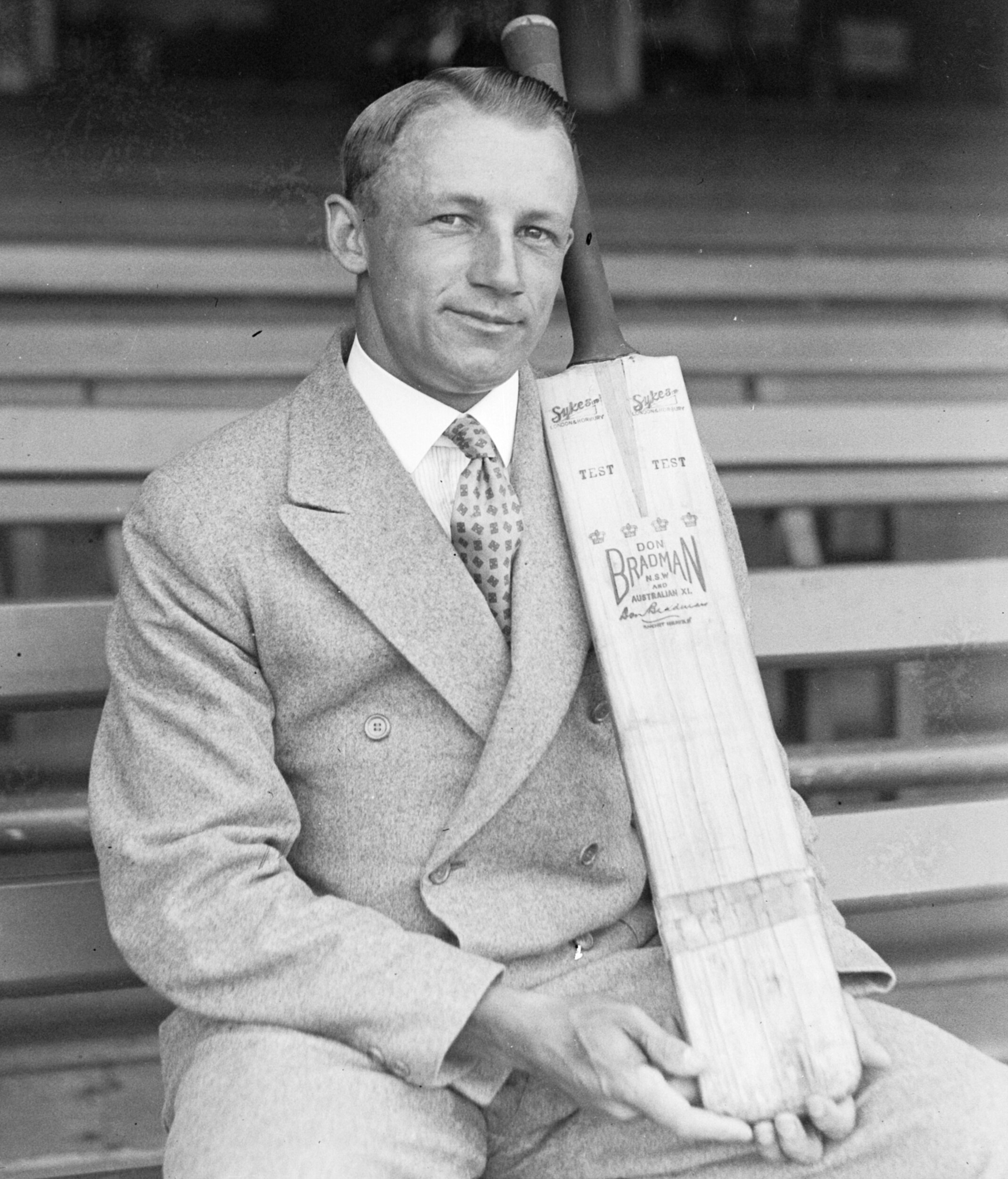
Craig was one of many players burdened with the tag of being the "next Bradman" (pictured).

Craig's breakthrough came in January 1953 when, at the age of 17 years and 207 days, he became the youngest double centurion in the history of first-class cricket at the time, in only his 13th first-class innings. As of 2024, he remains the youngest Australian to have achieved the feat. In a match for New South Wales against the touring South Africans, Craig came into bat on the second day and after a slow start reached 105 not out at the close of play. After play, he went to work at his job as an apprentice pharmacist. The next day, teammate Sid Barnes offered him a new bat if he reached 200. When play resumed, he took his score to 213 not out, helping to build a total of 416 runs for the loss of seven wickets (7/416). Hitting many cover drives, Craig scored quickly, making 98 of the 159 runs scored in a partnership with Keith Miller, a Test player known for his attacking strokeplay. Craig brought up his double century by sweeping Hugh Tayfield for a boundary.

The innings generated comparisons with Don Bradman, widely regarded as the finest batsman in cricket history. Bradman had dominated Australian sports media coverage for two decades until his retirement in 1948, and the Australian public were eager for another sporting hero of his magnitude. Bradman had not played first-class cricket at the age of 17 and was 20 when he made his Test debut, so Craig's quicker rise up the ranks caused much excitement. The Daily Telegraph said that Craig batted with "a grim purposefulness" that was "reminiscent of Bradman." Miller cautioned against heaping so much media pressure on Craig, but the newspapers persisted, even comparing Craig's batting grip to that of Bradman.

Craig's innings also caught the eye of Australian selectors and he was selected for the Test team. He was named twelfth man for the Fourth Test, before making his debut in the Fifth Test after Miller and Ray Lindwall were rested due to mild injuries. Australia were leading the series 2–1 heading into the deciding match.

== Test match career ==
=== Debut ===
Making his Test debut at the Melbourne Cricket Ground, Craig became, at the age of 17 years and 239 days, the youngest-ever Australian to play Test cricket. Australia batted first, and Craig received a standing ovation from the 47,000-strong crowd as he walked out to bat amid high expectations from the public. As South African captain Jack Cheetham stopped proceedings to set his field, the crowd jeered. Australia were comfortably positioned at 3/269 with Craig's partner Neil Harvey on his way to a double century. Craig cover drove his third ball, bowled by Percy Mansell, for four and quickly moved to 20. In an innings marked by leg glances and fine cuts, Craig progressed to 53 before the new ball was taken. He hit a ball into the covers and was caught, ending the 148-run partnership with Harvey and silencing the crowd. Australia collapsed and ended at 520 but still took a first innings lead of 85 runs. Craig top-scored in the second innings with 47, giving him exactly 100 runs for the match as Australia collapsed to be all out for 209 and conceded defeat by six wickets. Given Bradman's Test average of 99.94, Craig's match aggregate prompted further press discussions of Bradmanesque similarities. However, his debut ended on a sour note as South Africa scored 4/297 to win by six wickets and level the series 2–2.

=== Ashes tour of 1953 ===
Craig was selected for his first tour of England in 1953 as the last player to make the cut, after only 10 first-class matches. The youngest Australian player ever to be sent to England, Craig was 15 months younger than Clem Hill in 1896. He had been one of the leading batsmen of the summer, scoring 867 first-class runs at an average of 54.18 with seven half-centuries in addition to his double century. This placed him fourth among Australian batsmen for the season in terms of run-scoring, with only leading Test batsman Neil Harvey averaging higher. Craig had a strong preparation before departing for England, scoring fifties in three consecutive matches for the Australians on home soil.

Craig was again the centre of media speculation, with some media likening his arrival to Bradman's first tour of England in 1930. Bradman had scored a world Test series record of 974 runs in 1930, a mark that remains unsurpassed. At a reception at the start of the tour, British judge and cricket enthusiast Lord Birkett said: "If I know the English as I think I do, every Mother in the land will pray for him." During the tour he was presented with a birthday cake on television. However, the trip was unsuccessful in terms of batting.

Craig began poorly; in ten innings before the Tests started, he scored only 146 runs at 14.60 without passing fifty. He was overlooked for the First Test, and he continued to struggle for runs during the tour; he ended with 429 runs in 27 innings with a top score of 71 not out and an average of 16.50. He was not selected for any Tests. Craig had difficulty adjusting to the English pitch conditions and his confidence plummeted. Craig had particular trouble against off cutters on the seaming pitches. In a reception at Lord's, the home of cricket, Queen Elizabeth II asked him: "I understand this is your first visit to England?", which prompted Craig to reply "Yes, your majesty, and unless my batting improves, it will be my last." During the tour, tensions sometimes arose between the senior players, who were war veterans and drinkers, while the younger players including Craig tended to abstain from alcohol. Craig estimated that bus journeys to matches proceeded at an average speed of 16 km/h because of persistent stoppages outside pubs, something that frustrated the non-drinkers.

=== In the wilderness ===
Upon returning home, Craig was unable to maintain the level of performances that he displayed in the previous Australian summer. In a season which contained no international cricket, he scored 395 runs at an average of 35.90 in eight matches, placing him 20th in the season's run scoring list. He scored 93 in an eight-wicket victory over South Australia, and 106 for Arthur Morris's XI in a testimonial match against Lindsay Hassett's XI, his first century against Australian opposition.

Craig's career was interrupted by final year university studies for a diploma of pharmacy at the University of Sydney and national service, causing him to miss the entire 1954–55 season, including the home Test series against England, the early 1955 tour to the West Indies and the Sheffield Shield season. He returned to first-class cricket during the 1955–56 Australian season, and a healthy aggregate of 495 runs at 45.09 with one century. During the season, he made his first century in the Sheffield Shield, amassing 145 against Queensland. For these performances, he was selected for the 1956 Ashes tour, the last player to be picked.

=== Second Ashes tour ===
Craig's tour started poorly, and food poisoning hampered him until after the Second Test—one particular severe bout forced him to be hospitalised. In his first six first-class matches, Craig made only 104 runs at 17.33. His tour began to improve in late June, when he made consecutive half-centuries against Yorkshire and Gloucestershire before breaking through in a match against Somerset. He was dropped before going on to score 62 and 100 not out—his first century in 38 innings in England. He was selected for the Fourth Test at Old Trafford, after Australia had suffered a heavy defeat at Headingley in the Third Test at the hands of the Surrey spin pairing of Jim Laker and Tony Lock, Australia's first innings defeat in 18 years. The Fourth Test was to be known as Laker's Test, in which Laker took a record 19 wickets in the match. Laker trapped Craig leg before wicket for eight in the first innings as Australia were bowled out for 84. In the second innings, Craig came out to bat at 1/28 in the second innings on a sticky wicket and combined in a defiant third-wicket partnership of 59 with Colin McDonald. He battled for over four hours in compiling 38 before being dismissed by Laker. Reflecting on the match, Craig said "Jim bowled well, and we batted very badly. We were all pissed off, felt we'd been dudded and we dropped our bundle a bit." His stubborn display saw him retain his position for the Fifth Test at The Oval when he scored two and seven. Craig ended the season with 872 runs at 36.33 from 20 matches, with one century and five fifties, the fifth highest aggregate for the Australians.

Despite his failure to reach double figures at The Oval, Craig maintained his position in the playing XI on the tour of the Indian subcontinent en route to Australia in late 1956, playing Test matches against Pakistan and India. However, he failed to pass 40 in his five innings. He made a duck and 18 on a matting wicket in Australia's one-off Test against Pakistan in Karachi before playing in the First Test against India, scoring 40 in an innings win in Madras. He was dropped for the Second Test but returned to make 36 and 6 in the Third Test in Calcutta as Australia took a 2–0 series win. The matches were the first time that Australia had played a Test in Asia.

== Captaincy of Australia ==
=== Youngest-ever captain ===
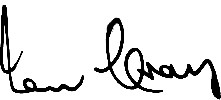
Craig's signature

The 1956–57 season marked the start of a renewal phase in Australian cricket. Australia had lost three consecutive Ashes series and had fallen from the heights of the "Invincibles" team that had toured England in 1948. Australia were not scheduled to play any Tests until a tour of South Africa in 1957–58 and captain Ian Johnson and his deputy Keith Miller retired upon their return to Australia, both men being in their late 30s. In a move regarded as surprising, the 21-year-old Craig, rather than Richie Benaud, replaced the retired Miller as state captain and staked his claim to be a part of Australia's long-term future with a consistent season in which he scored 521 runs at an average of 47.36, with two centuries. New South Wales won another Sheffield Shield title under Craig's leadership. In one match against arch-rivals Victoria, Craig was ill with tonsillitis, but came out to bat with his team struggling at 7/70 while chasing a low total of 161. Craig made 24 and put on 70 with Benaud to take his team towards victory, but the match eventually ended in a tie.

Near the end of the 1956–57 season, the selectors met to choose a team for a short non-Test tour of New Zealand. The leading contender for the captaincy was 28-year-old Victorian Neil Harvey, who had been a regular member of the team for eight years and was the senior batsman. However, both Harvey and Miller had been criticised for their attitude towards Johnson in an official report to the board about the 1956 tour. The selectors thus thrust Craig into the leadership at the age of 21 and a half. He was a young player leading an inexperienced team—the youngest cricket team from any country to be sent overseas, with no players older than 30. It was seen as a bold move, as Craig had only played six Tests, was far from being a regular member of the team and had only a year of captaincy at first-class level.

The day after the announcement, the Harvey-led Victorians met Craig's New South Welshmen at the SCG. Harvey admitted to being irked by the board's snub and felt that it was because of his blunt nature. The men were cordial at the toss and Craig sent the Victorians in to bat. At the same time, Colin McDonald broke his nose while practising in the nets and was taken to hospital. Harvey asked Craig for a gentleman's agreement to allow a substitute, but the home skipper refused. An angry Harvey struck 209 in five hours, but Craig scored 45 and 93 to help secure a draw and therefore win the Sheffield Shield.

Craig, regarded as a personable, level-headed and well-educated man, was seen as an investment in the future. Personal skills were seen as important in an era when captains were expected to make many after-dinner speeches at functions on tours, especially to England. Ray Robinson opined that "a sincere nature and unassuming manner" reduced the risk of team friction in the rebuilding phase and that Craig was "level headed and tactful beyond his years." Craig's lack of leadership ambition was cited as a major reason for the improvement in team harmony. The New Zealand tour was regarded as a test of Craig's leadership. Wicket-keeper Barry Jarman said that Craig "had to do it himself...I wasn't so dumb that I couldn't see the senior players didn't give him much support." The senior players resented his surprise selection as captain, but he gained favour by defying a management-imposed curfew, which was later scrapped.

During the tour, the Australians won all three of their first-class matches against the hosts' provincial teams. The Australians then played against a New Zealand representative team, although the matches were not classified as Tests. In the first game, Craig scored an unbeaten 123 in the second innings to ensure a draw after the visitors had conceded a first innings lead. In the second match, Australia stumbled to 6/146 in their second innings after conceding a first innings lead of 34. After the unconvincing performances in the first two matches, Craig scored 57 in the third, which Australia won by ten wickets. Craig ended with 224 runs at 56.00 in the three international matches and 308 runs at 38.50 overall.

=== South African tour ===
At the start of the 1957–58 season, Craig was made captain for Australia's Test tour to South Africa, making him the youngest captain in Test history at the age of 22 years and 194 days, with Harvey as his deputy. The appointment came despite his mixed batting form during the New Zealand tour. The selectors further demonstrated their view to the future when they dropped veteran Ray Lindwall altogether. The average age of Craig's team was two and a half years younger than the Australian squad sent to England in 1956, and they had only one player over the age of 30, whereas the 1956 team had five members over the age of 30. As a result of the team's relative inexperience, they were judged by critics to be the worst to have left Australian shores. Craig joined his team in Johannesburg after flying in from London, where he had been working for six months as a pharmacist, with the approval of the Australian board.

Craig's workload grew after the team manager Jack Jantke suffered a heart attack before the tour, leaving the captain to handle off-field matters until a replacement for Jantke was found two weeks later. Craig instituted a novel set of rules to raise morale, but journalists and former player Dick Whitington derided it as "Anglicised fripperies", while Jack Fingleton said that Craig was "much too callow in years and experience to lead a team abroad." Some players remained resentful of Craig's dubious elevation but appreciated that he had not promoted himself and that he was fair and open to input from teammates.

Craig made a good start to the tour in two warm-up matches against Rhodesia, scoring a century in each match. Australia won the matches by an innings and ten wickets respectively. Craig led his men in five first-class matches before the Tests and Australia won all by convincing margins; three ended in innings victories and the others were won by nine and ten wickets. This included a match against a South African XI, in which Craig scored 88 as Australia amassed 8/519 declared before winning by an innings.

Craig led his team into the First Test at Johannesburg starting on 23 December with an inexperienced bowling attack. With Lindwall dropped, the pace attack was led by Alan Davidson, who at the time had managed only 16 Test wickets in 12 matches. Davidson's partner Ian Meckiff was making his debut. Benaud was in his first Test as the lead spinner, while left arm wrist spinner Lindsay Kline was another debutant. In all, Craig's team had four debutants. Craig made only 14 and 17 as his team held on for a draw. At the end of the match, an unpopular 10 p.m. curfew that was imposed by the replacement manager was repealed.

The Australian skipper again struggled with the bat in the Second Test in Cape Town, making a duck, but this was overlooked by the media as his team won by a decisive innings margin. In the Third Test at Durban, Craig made 52 on a pitch that was difficult for batting, his first Test half-century since his debut. His team scored 163 in their first innings, and after the hosts made 384, Craig made a duck as Australia struggled to a score of 7/292, salvaging a draw in the process. In the Fourth Test at Johannesburg, Craig promoted Benaud ahead of him in the batting order, feeling that flexibility in the team interest was paramount. Benaud scored a century, prompting Robinson to describe Craig's action as "the most imaginative piece of captaincy of the season." The innings allowed Australia to seize the momentum and set up a 10-wicket victory, which yielded an unassailable 2–0 series lead.

Despite the disagreement as to whether Craig was deserving of the captaincy, the team proceeded without infighting. Prior to the Fifth Test, Craig wanted to drop himself due to poor form, which would have made Harvey captain. Peter Burge, the third member of the selection panel and a Harvey supporter, was comfortable with this, but Harvey ordered Burge to retain Craig. When the vote was formally taken, Harvey and Burge outvoted Craig, who was still offering to drop himself.

Craig failed to pass 20 in the Fifth Test as Australia won again to take a creditable 3–0 series win, something highly unexpected at the beginning of the tour. Overall, Craig's men won 11 of their 20 first-class games on tour, and the South African Cricket Annual recognised the Australian captain's leadership by naming him as one of their Five Cricketers of the Year.

== Later career ==
=== Hepatitis ===
Although the match results were encouraging for such a young and inexperienced team, Craig scored only 103 runs at 14.71. Despite his contributions as a leader, this was not up to standard. He had trouble with his defence, being bowled eight times in 17 innings. In the 12 matches in the last three months of the tour, Craig passed fifty only once in 13 innings. However, the selectors did not have to reverse their youth policy: Craig contracted a bout of hepatitis before the start of the 1958–59 season. He returned to cricket at the beginning of the season, but was underprepared, scoring two ducks in his only two innings of the season, the second coming against the touring England team. Craig declared that he was not ready for a return to Test cricket and relinquished the captaincy, which the selectors handed to Benaud. Benaud went on to defeat England 4–0; as England were widely regarded as the best team at the time, this established him as captain of a resurgent Australia.

The illness-enforced layoff left Craig facing an uphill battle to regain his place in the national team. Prior to the start of the 1959–60 season, Craig recovered his health and toured South Africa with a Commonwealth XI, where he scored 276 runs at 55.20 including a century against a combined Transvaal XI.

=== Attempted comeback ===
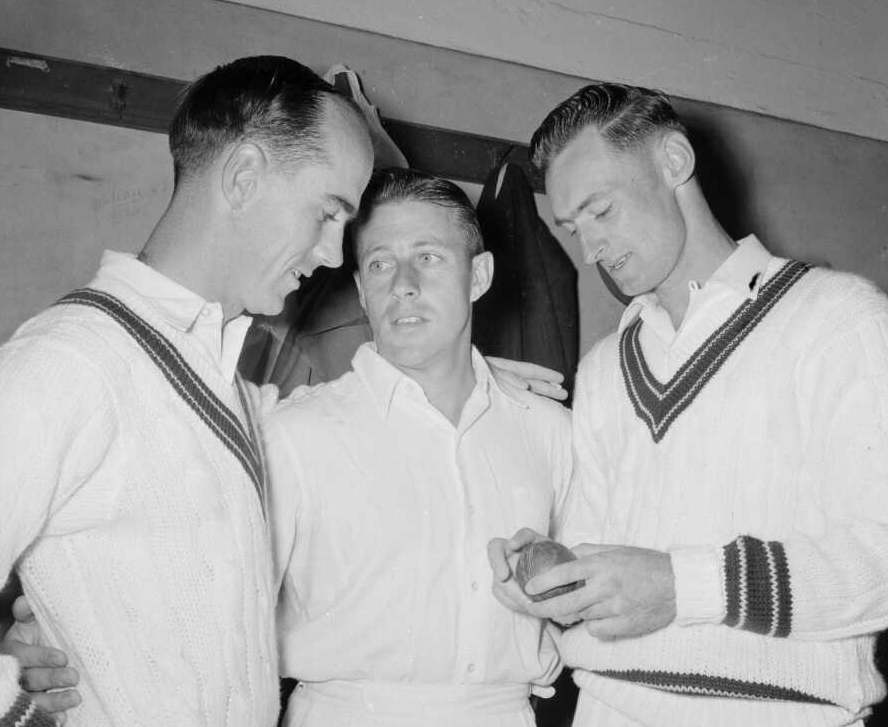
Craig (left), Johnny Martin and Brian Booth in New Zealand in 1960

Returning to Australia, he had a moderately successful Sheffield Shield season, accumulating 376 runs at 31.33 with three half-centuries. New South Wales went on to win another title. The selectors named him to lead an Australian Second XI to New Zealand—while the first choice team toured the Indian subcontinent—hoping that he was still good enough to secure a long-term future in the Australian team. The four matches against New Zealand were closely contested. In the first match, Australia were 7/201 in pursuit of 22 for victory when time ran out. In the second fixture, Craig made 70 as the tourists struggled to 8/211 in pursuit of 262 for victory to hold on for a draw. After narrowly escaping defeat in the first two matches, Australia won the third match by eight wickets. In the final match, Australia reduced New Zealand to 8/149 in pursuit of 284 when time ran out, sealing a 1–0 series win. Craig struggled with the bat, making 222 runs at 27.75 in the games against New Zealand.

Craig had a strong Sheffield Shield season in 1960–61. At the time, he had become a production manager at his pharmaceutical firm and declared that the season would be his last owing to work commitments. His employers had been pressuring him to commit to a career after cricket. Early in the campaign, Craig scored consecutive centuries against Queensland and Victoria. He then scored 83 as New South Wales defeated the touring West Indians by an innings and 97 runs, but he was overlooked for Test selection. He ended his season with 197 in an innings victory over Western Australia. Overall, he totalled 710 runs at 59.16, as New South Wales won their eighth successive Shield. After a successful campaign, he reversed his decision and made himself available for the 1961 tour of England, but Bill Lawry was selected ahead of him.

=== Final season ===
The 1961–62 season was Craig's last at first-class level; he accumulated 629 runs at 37.00, with seven fifties but he was unable to convert any of these into a century. In one match against arch-rivals Victoria, Craig scored 80 and 65 not out to help his team to a ten-wicket triumph. New South Wales won six consecutive matches to seal another title, but Craig found himself under increasing pressure for his place in the state team; with no internationals that season, all the Test players were available, which put his position under threat. New South Wales had a streak of nine consecutive Shield titles up until 1961–62, and the batting line-up was particularly strong. The 1950s–60s era teams were regarded as among the strongest in Australian history. In total, Craig acted as captain in 48 first-class matches, winning 27, tying one and losing only two. Although Craig's record as the youngest captain in Test history has now been surpassed, he remains the youngest Australian to have scored a first-class double century, play a Test match and then captain the national team.

Craig signed off on his first-class career at the end of the season with a tour of New Zealand with an International XI. He played in three matches and ended with 240 runs at 48.00; in his final match, against the Cricket Club of India President's XI, he made 101, his 15th century at first-class level.

== Style ==
Standing 173 cm (5 ft 8 in) and weighing 63 kg (139 lb), Craig was a lightly built and frail looking batsman. He had a neat and compact batting style. Craig was known for his leg side batting repertoire, in particular his ability to clip the ball from his pads. He had an unorthodox grip, low on the bat handle with the back of the top hand pointing to point. This caused him to have a tendency to close the face of his bat. Although Craig was small in stature, he was still able to hit the ball a long distance. During the testimonial match for Lindsay Hassett at the end of the 1953–54 season, Craig struck four sixes in five balls from the off spin of Johnson. During his first tour to England, Craig had difficulty with off cutters bowled by pacemen and eschewed the hook shot, but after his comeback from illness, he transformed himself into an opening batsman, earning praise for his performances against the express pace of Wes Hall and Ian Meckiff. Benaud felt that Craig was finally reaping the rewards of his early experience. On Australian pitches, Craig had a reputation for having difficulty with the left arm wrist spin of Kline and David Sincock. Craig's light build allowed him to move quickly while fielding, prompting Robinson to call him "the Bambi of the fielding side." In his early years, Craig was a non-smoker, but the pressure and tension brought on by the burden of captaincy resulted in him taking up the habit. He was known for being softly spoken, with his players often having to ask him to repeat his instructions. Craig had a reputation for being good-natured; he did not complain about his cricket career and said that he had "no regrets."

== After cricket ==
Craig retired from first-class cricket at just 26 years of age in 1962, but continued playing for Mosman in Sydney grade cricket on weekends until 1969. His marriage to Rosslyn Carroll in 1962 and his pharmaceutical career prevented him from applying himself fully to cricket. The couple had a boy and a girl, as well as an adopted son. Craig joined the Australian subsidiary of the British pharmaceutical firm Boots, rising to the position of managing director. He later served on the board of directors of the Bradman Museum in Bowral and later became its chairman. He was a board member of the New South Wales Cricket Association (NSWCA) for three years and served on the Trust of the Sydney Cricket Ground for varying periods from 1968 to 1996, totalling 18 years. Upon first being appointed in 1968 to replace Stan McCabe, Craig was the youngest ever trustee of the SCG. One of the most controversial incidents during this time occurred in 1977–78 during the period of the breakaway World Series Cricket, which wanted to install floodlights at the SCG. The NSWCA opposed this, while the government sided with WSC. As a result of Craig's support of the NSWCA, the government dismissed him. Craig retired as the managing director of Boots' Australian subsidiaries. Craig was awarded the Medal of the Order of Australia in 1997 for his contributions to cricket as a player and administrator. He died in Bowral from cancer on 16 November 2014.

== Test match performance ==
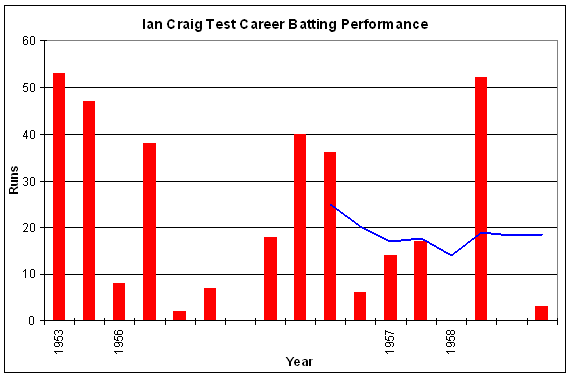
Ian Craig's Test career batting graph. The red bars indicate the runs that he scored in an innings, with the blue line indicating the batting average in his last 10 innings.

		Batting			
Opposition	Matches	Runs	Average	High Score	100 / 50
England	2	55	13.75	38	0/0
India	2	82	27.33	40	0/0
Pakistan	1	18	9.00	18	0/0
South Africa	6	203	22.55	53	0/2
Overall	11	358	19.88	53	0/2

Sporting positions
Preceded by Ian Johnson	Australian Test cricket captains 1957/58	Succeeded by Richie Benaud
