= Sandil Natkan =

Indian cricketer

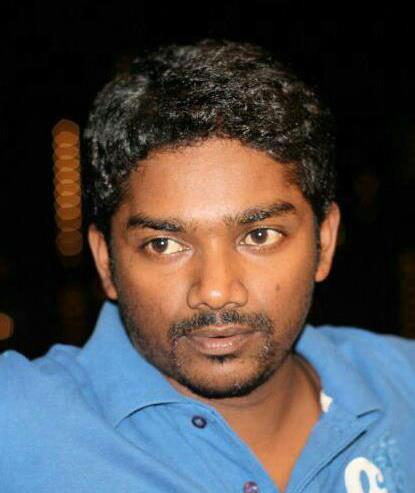
Sandil Natkan

Sandil Natkan (born 24 September 1983) is an Indian cricketer. He is a right-handed batsman and right-arm medium-pace bowler who played for Saurashtra. Born in Rajkot.

He played in several Saurashtra youth teams, Under-14 as captain of saurashtra team & Under-16 to Under-25 level between 1998 and 2006, made a first-class appearance for the side, during the 2006-07 Ranji Trophy season, against Baroda. Natkan made a Twenty20 appearance during the same season, though he did not bat, he took figures of 2–12 with the ball. He also played a warm-up match against South Africa in Mumbai and played Invitational match against UAE in Abu Dhabi for Saurashtra.
