= David Sincock =

Australian cricketer (born 1942)

Personal information
- Born: 1 February 1942 (age 84); North Adelaide, South Australia
- Batting: Right-handed
- Bowling: Slow left-arm wrist-spin

International information
- National side: Australia
- Test debut (cap 232): 4 December 1964 v Pakistan
- Last Test: 7 January 1966 v England

Career statistics
Competition	Test	First-class
Matches	3	46
Runs scored	80	838
Batting average	26.66	17.45
100s/50s	0/0	0/4
Top score	29	61*
Balls bowled	724	9,492
Wickets	8	159
Bowling average	51.25	36.87
5 wickets in innings	0	10
10 wickets in match	0	1
Best bowling	3/67	7/48
Catches/stumpings	2/0	27/0
- Source: Cricinfo, 27 April 2018

David John Sincock (born 1 February 1942) is a former Australian cricketer who played in three Test matches from 1964 to 1966.

Nicknamed "Evil Dick" by his teammates, Sincock was called "one of the most interesting bowlers I have ever played against" by Garry Sobers, who claimed that Sincock turned the ball more than any other bowler he had faced and had an unreadable googly. However, Sobers noted that Sincock was too inconsistent, bowling an over of long hops and full tosses for every unplayable delivery. His last Test was against England in the Third Test at Sydney in 1965-66, Sincock was hit for 0/98, but made a fighting 29 and 27 as Australia suffered their worst home defeat in over 50 years. The selectors promptly dropped five players including Sincock and the stand-in captain, Brian Booth, neither of whom played for Australia again.

Sincock dropped out of first-class cricket after the 1965–66 season, moving to Sydney where he played for Sydney Grade Cricket club Northern District. He later said, "I definitely didn't want to be a professional sportsman ... Once I'd got a guy out I couldn't really see the point in getting him out again next week." He became a successful business executive.

== Sources ==
- Haigh, G. (1997) The Summer Game: Australia in test cricket 1949-71, Text Publishing: Melbourne. ISBN 9781875847440.
- Sobers, G. (1988) Twenty Years at the Top, MacMillan London, ISBN 978-0-330-30868-7.
