= List of cricketers called for throwing in top-class cricket matches in Australia =

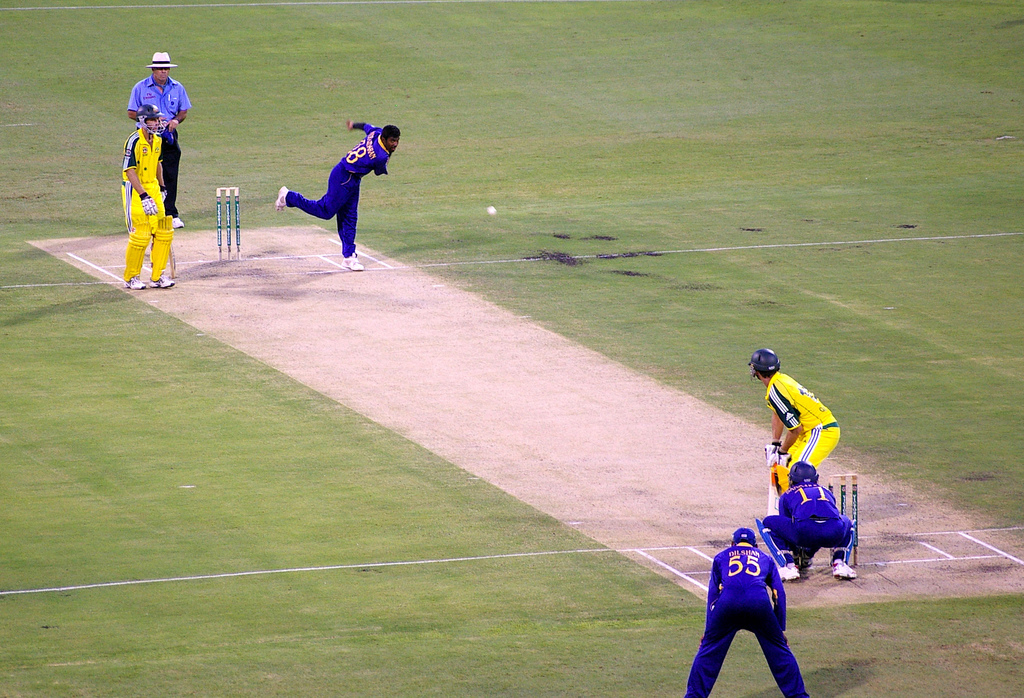
Muttiah Muralitharan bowling in a One Day International against Australia in early 2006. Just over a decade earlier, also in Australia, he was called for throwing twice in ten days by two different umpires—Darrell Hair and Ross Emerson.

This is a list of cricketers called for throwing in top-class cricket matches in Australia. In the sport of cricket, strict rules govern the method of bowling the ball. The rules relate to the bending of the arm at the elbow, the extent of which has always been open to interpretation by the umpires. More recently, the International Cricket Council has attempted to codify the maximum permissible flexing of the elbow as 15 degrees.

When a player is found by the umpire to have delivered the ball contrary to those rules, the umpire will call a no-ball and he is said to have been called for throwing. Where public opinion is that a player's bowling action appears to be that he routinely throws, he is said to have a 'suspect' or an 'illegal' action, or more derogatorily, is said to be a 'chucker'. The issue is often highly emotive with accusers considering that deliveries with an illegal action are akin to cheating.

Over the years, a number of players have been called in top-class matches – Test matches, One Day Internationals and domestic first-class matches – invariably creating controversy and occasionally destroying cricket careers. Often the player has been able to modify his action to appease his critics and the umpires, but more commonly, especially when the bowler has been called on more than one occasion, his career in international cricket is effectively ended.

== List of players called for throwing ==
Note: Entries marked with blue backgrounds were called for throwing in a Test match or One Day International (ODI) played in Australia.

Player	Date	Team	Opposing team	Umpire
Tom Wills	30 March 1872	Victoria	New South Wales	A. Sellars
Dave Gregory	26 December 1872	NSW, Tasmania, SA XIII	Victoria	George Curtis
Tom Wills	28 December 1872	Victoria	NSW, Tasmania, SA XIII	George Curtis
Richard Wardill	14 March 1873	Victoria	Tasmania	William Sidebottom
Ernie Jones	30 October 1897	South Australia	Andrew Stoddart's XI	Jim Phillips
Ernie Jones (Test)	4 January 1898	Australia	England	Jim Phillips
Jack Marsh	27 December 1900	New South Wales	Victoria	Bob Crockett
Jack Marsh	1 February 1901	New South Wales	Victoria	Bob Crockett
Jack Marsh	4 February 1901	New South Wales	Victoria	Bob Crockett
Frank Pitcher	3 February 1911	Victoria	South Africa	Bob Crockett
Frank Pitcher	4 February 1911	Victoria	South Africa	W. A. Young
Tommy Andrews	7 November 1914	New South Wales	Queensland	unknown
Ron Halcombe	17 January 1930	Western Australia	Victoria	Andrew Barlow
Ron Halcombe	24 January 1930	Western Australia	Tasmania	A. J. Buttsworth
Ron Halcombe	25 January 1930	Western Australia	Tasmania	Walter Lonergan
Laurie Nash	26 January 1931	Tasmania	Victoria	unknown
Eddie Gilbert	18 December 1931	Queensland	Victoria	Andrew Barlow
Harold Cotton	13 November 1936	South Australia	Victoria	Andrew Barlow
Charles MacGill	7 March 1939	Western Australia	Victoria	Fred Buttsworth
Harold Cotton	14 December 1940	South Australia	Victoria	Andrew Barlow
Ron Frankish	17 February 1951	Western Australia	Victoria	Andrew Barlow
Jack McLaughlin	2 January 1960	Queensland	New South Wales	Jim Bowden
Brian Quigley	4 November 1960	South Australia	Victoria	Col Egar
Gordon Brooks	3 March 1962	South Australia	New Zealand	Col Egar
Ian Meckiff	11 January 1963	Victoria	South Australia	Jack Kierse
Ian Meckiff	4 March 1963	Victoria	Queensland	Bill Priem
Ian Meckiff (Test)	7 December 1963	Australia	South Africa	Col Egar
Eddie Illingworth	13 November 1964	Victoria	South Australia	Col Egar
Eddie Illingworth	13 November 1964	Victoria	South Australia	Jack Ryan
Keith Slater	16 November 1964	Western Australia	New South Wales	Ted Wykes
Barry Fisher	24 November 1967	Queensland	New South Wales	Ted Wykes
Muttiah Muralitharan (Test)	26 December 1995	Sri Lanka	Australia	Darrell Hair
Muttiah Muralitharan (ODI)	5 January 1996	Sri Lanka	West Indies	Ross Emerson; Tony McQuillan
Geoff Foley	1 November 1997	Queensland	Victoria	Ross Emerson
Geoff Foley	11 February 1998	Queensland	Tasmania	Ross Emerson
Muttiah Muralitharan (ODI)	23 January 1999	Sri Lanka	England	Ross Emerson

== See also ==
- List of international cricketers called for throwing
