= Result (cricket) =

Win, tie, or draw; subject of Law 16 of the bat-and-ball game's rules

The result in a game of cricket may be a "win" for one of the two teams playing, or a "tie". In the case of a limited overs game, the game can also end with "no result" if the game cannot be finished on time (usually due to weather or bad light), and in other forms of cricket, a "draw" may be possible. Which of these results applies, and how the result is expressed, is governed by Law 16 of the laws of cricket.

== Win and loss ==
The result of a match is a "win" when one side scores more runs than the opposing side and all the innings of the team that has fewer runs have been completed. The side scoring more runs has "won" the game, and the side scoring fewer has "lost". If the match ends without all the innings being completed, the result may be a draw or no result.

== Results where neither team wins ==
=== Tie ===
The result of a match is a "tie" when the scores are equal at the conclusion of play, but only if the side batting last has completed its innings (i.e. all innings are completed, or, in limited-overs cricket, the set number of overs has been played or play is terminally stopped by weather or bad light).

This is unusual in Test cricket: only two tied Tests have ever occurred.

==== Tiebreakers ====
In some forms of Limited overs cricket, such as Twenty20, a Super Over or a bowl-out is sometimes used as a tiebreaker to decide a result that would otherwise be a tie. The result of the match is recorded in official statistics as Tie+W or Tie+L to indicate matches initially tied and then won or lost in the tiebreaker. In such cases, the results carry the same points as a regular win or loss in competition tables.

=== Draw ===
The result of a match is a "draw" if a match is concluded, as defined in Law 16, without being a win or a tie. A draw therefore occurs when one or both of the teams have not completed their innings by the scheduled end of play. In matches where the number of overs is not limited, therefore, a team unable to win may be able to "save the draw" by either avoiding being all-out if they are batting (i.e. by having two or more batsmen left at the end of play who are "not out"), or, if bowling, by slowing down the scoring of the batting team. The match is then drawn regardless of the total of runs accumulated by either side. Some league competitions allow for a "winning draw" (and therefore also a "losing draw"), allocating more points to one of the teams based on factors such as run rates or overall runs scored. The official result is still a draw.

=== No result ===
A "no result" is recorded if a limited overs match which has been started cannot be completed, which usually occurs if weather or light interrupts play. In the case of rain playing a factor, this is often known as the match being "washed out". The result is effectively the same as a draw.

Limited overs cricket formats require that each team has to have the opportunity bat for a minimum number of overs in order for a result to be possible: 20 overs in One Day International cricket and 5 overs in Twenty20 cricket.

If each team is able to face at least this number of overs, a result is possible and can be calculated using the Duckworth–Lewis–Stern method or other competition rules.

==== Abandoned ====
A match can be "abandoned" or "cancelled" if weather or other conditions prevent any play from occurring at all. If the toss has not been taken when the officials decide to abandon play, the result is termed "abandoned without a ball being bowled". Such a game is not included in official statistical records.

Before July 2004, the same result occurred if the toss had been taken but the match was abandoned before a ball was bowled. Since 2004, the International Cricket Council for International matches have decreed that a match where the toss takes place but which is abandoned without a ball being bowled is either a draw or (for a limited-overs match) a no result. Such games are now included in statistical records, counting, for example, as a game played by the teams and nominated players.

== Rare results ==
=== Awarded ===
The umpires also have the power to "award" a match to one side where the other side either concedes defeat or in the opinion of the umpires refuses to play, in which case the game can be deemed to have been forfeited by the side in question. (Note that this is not the same as the (voluntary) forfeiture of an innings under Law 15.) This power is very rarely used. Before this rule was introduced there had been cases in the international arena where one team has refused to play, or deliberately stopped playing for a while. One notable incident was when Sri Lanka temporarily stopped play during a match in January 1999 against England when Muttiah Muralitharan was called for throwing by umpire Ross Emerson (Muralitharan having previously been called for throwing by another umpire Darrell Hair in previous fixtures). A similar case occurred in the Sydney Test in 1971, when umpires came close to awarding the match to Australia after England players withdrew during crowd disturbances.

The only time that a Test match has been won in this manner is when umpires Darrell Hair and Billy Doctrove awarded England the Fourth Test against Pakistan on 20 August 2006 after Pakistan refused to take the field at the scheduled time after tea on the fourth day. This was because Hair alleged that Pakistani bowlers tampered with the ball. He did not name a player involved in the incident. Later during the ICC general body meeting in 2008, the result was changed to "match drawn", and then in February 2009 changed back to an England win.

In one-day international cricket, on 3 November 1978, Pakistan were awarded the third ODI against India when India conceded the match in protest against short-pitched bowling.

On 13 March 1996, in a World Cup semi-final held in India, Sri Lanka were awarded the match against India by default when crowd disturbances made it impossible for the game to continue. Sri Lanka were well ahead of India at the time.

=== Conceded ===
Law 16 allows a team to concede a match. This seldom happens, but it covers the situation where the scoreboard has in good faith displayed an incorrect score which is accepted by the "losing" team, who leave the field, thereby conceding the match to the opposition.

== Statement of result ==
The result of a cricket match is stated in several ways.

If the side batting last wins the match without losing all its wickets, the result shall be stated as a win by the number of wickets still then to fall. For example, in a single-innings match, if Team A bat first and make 200 runs, then Team B make 201 after losing four wickets out of ten, Team B is said to have "won by six wickets", regardless of how many batsmen Team A lost during their innings.

If the side fielding last wins the match, the result shall be stated as a win by runs. For instance, if Team A bat first and make 200 runs, but Team B make only 192, Team A is said to have "won by eight runs".

If the side batting last has lost all its wickets, but as the result of an award of five penalty runs at the end of the match has scored a total of runs in excess of the total scored by the opposing side, the result shall be stated as a win to that side by penalty runs.

In a two-innings match, if the number of runs scored in its first innings by the side due to bat last is greater than the total runs scored by the opposition in both its innings, the result is stated as a win by an innings and number of runs short. Here "due to bat last" includes a team who batted first, but forced their opponent to follow-on (bat consecutive innings). If Team A bat first and make 200 runs in their first innings, Team B make 300 runs in their first innings, and Team A only make 95 runs in their second innings, Team B is said to have "won by an innings and five runs".

If the match is decided by one side conceding defeat or refusing to play, the result shall be stated as "match conceded" or "match awarded".

If a match is unfinished when time expires, the result is a "draw" (this does not apply to limited overs cricket, where this is considered to be "no result"). If all innings of both teams are completed (either because all batsmen have been dismissed or one/more innings are completed by way of a declaration) and the totals are exactly equal, the match is a "tie".
