= Frank Pitcher =

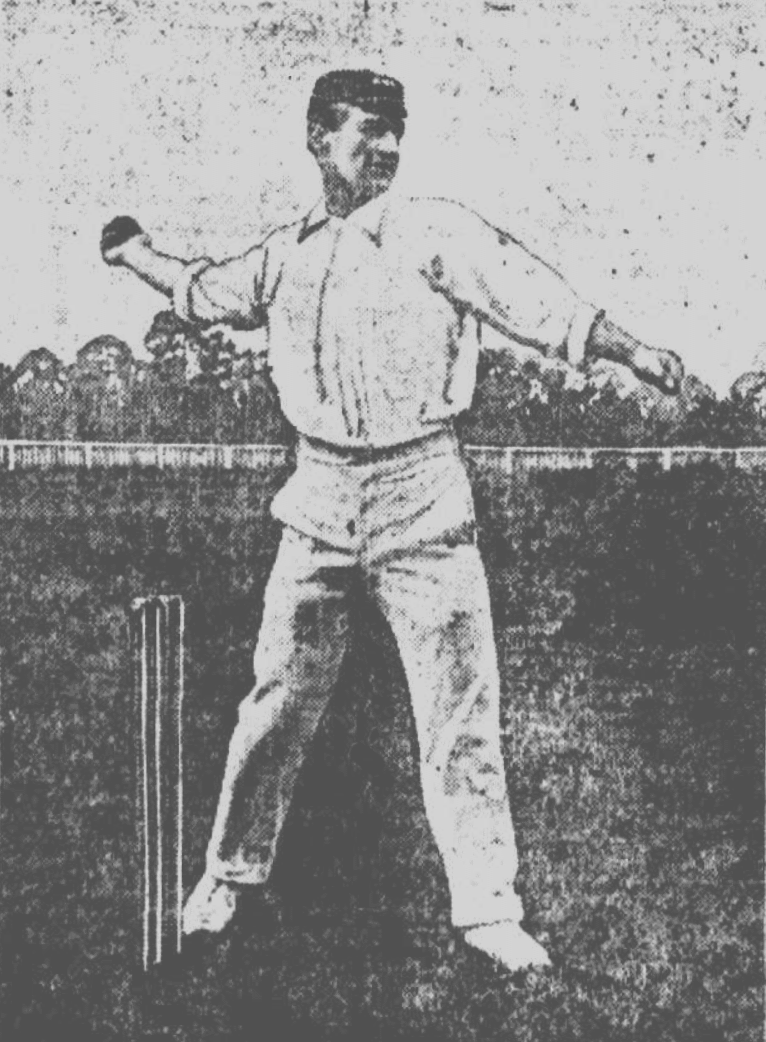

Personal information
- Full name: Franklyn Joseph Pitcher
- Born: 24 June 1879; Collingwood, Victoria, Australia
- Died: 23 January 1921 (aged 41); Northcote, Victoria, Australia
- Batting: Right-handed
- Bowling: Right-arm medium
- Role: Bowler

Domestic team information
- Years: Team
- 1910/11: Victoria

Career statistics
| Competition | First-class |
|---|---|
| Matches | 1 |
| Runs scored | 18 |
| Batting average | 9.00 |
| 100s/50s | 0/0 |
| Top score | 18 |
| Balls bowled | 12 |
| Wickets | 0 |
| Bowling average | – |
| 5 wickets in innings | – |
| 10 wickets in match | – |
| Best bowling | – |
| Catches/stumpings | 0/– |
- Source: CricInfo, 20 December 2007

Franklyn Joseph Pitcher (24 June 1879 – 23 January 1921) was an Australian first-class cricket player who represented Victoria in one match in 1910–11 against the touring South Africans. Pitcher was a right-arm medium pace bowler. During the match Pitcher became the first player to be no-balled by both umpires in a match at first-class level of cricket in Australia. Pitcher was also the only player to be no-balled for throwing in his debut match at first-class level.

Pitcher made his first-class debut for Victoria against South Africa on a match starting on 3 February 1911. John Zulch and Louis Stricker were opening the batting for the tourists and Pitcher was no-balled by umpire Bob Crockett for throwing his first three deliveries, with Zulch taking strike. Pitcher appeared to be shaken by the incident and he also delivered a wide and another no-ball. At the end of this first over, he was replaced by his captain Warwick Armstrong.

The following day, Pitcher was no-balled for a fifth time by umpire W. A. Young in his second over. Pitcher was passed on the first five deliveries of the over but the sixth was called by Young as a no-ball. A correspondent for the Melbourne Age described the sixth delivery as "an undeniable throw". Pitcher attempted to change his action, but this disrupted his length and he was twice struck for four by South African captain Dave Nourse. After the over, Pitcher was taken from the attack by Armstrong.

Pitcher was never selected at first-class level again and it was the first occasion in Australia when a bowler was called by both officiating umpires. The matter did not end after the match, as Pitcher's district club, Collingwood, pursued an inquiry with the Victorian Cricket Association although an executive committee of the VCA found that the complaints of the club were spurious. Pitcher was not called as district level before his only state appearance and he continued until the 1913–14 season without further complaints. Pitcher also played baseball for Collingwood.

== See also ==
- List of cricketers called for throwing in top-class cricket matches in Australia
