= William Sidebottom =

William Sidebottom may refer to:

- William Sidebottom (English politician) (1841–1933), English Conservative politician
- William Sidebottom (RAF officer) (1893–1920), British World War I flying ace
- William Sidebottom (cricketer) (1862–1948), Australian cricketer
- William Sidebottom (Australian politician) (1836–1932), member of the Tasmanian House of Assembly
