= Jack McLaughlin (cricketer) =

Australian cricketer (1930–2023)

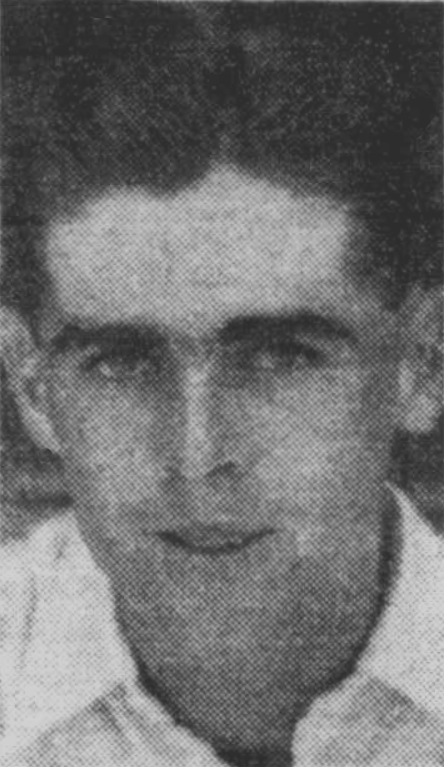

Personal information
- Full name: John Joseph McLaughlin
- Born: 18 February 1930; Corinda, Brisbane, Queensland, Australia
- Died: 13 March 2023 (aged 93)
- Batting: Right-handed
- Bowling: Right-arm off-break

Domestic team information
- Years: Team
- 1949–50 to 1962–63: Queensland

Career statistics
Competition	First-class
Matches	59
Runs scored	2988
Batting average	33.95
100s/50s	4/16
Top score	146
Balls bowled
Wickets	1
Bowling average	130.00
5 wickets in innings	0
10 wickets in match	0
Best bowling	1/31
Catches/stumpings	24/–
- Source: Cricinfo, 21 December 2017

John Joseph McLaughlin (18 February 1930 – 13 March 2023) was an Australian first-class cricketer and a commentator who played for Queensland in 59 first-class matches between 1949 and 1963.

Jack McLaughlin began his first-class career in 1949–50 as a cautious opening batsman, but after two seasons of only moderate success in Queensland's Sheffield Shield side he lost his place. He returned in 1956–57 as a stroke-playing middle-order batsman and outstanding fieldsman and remained in the side for several years.

He made his two highest scores within a month in the 1957–58 season, both against South Australia: 136 in Adelaide, when he and Ray Reynolds added 243 for the second wicket, and 52 and 146 in Brisbane. In Shield matches that season he made 615 runs at an average of 47.30.

A very occasional bowler, he deliberately threw in a Sheffield Shield match against New South Wales in 1959–60 in protest at what he considered the dubious bowling actions of some of the New South Wales players. After he retired from first-class cricket he became a columnist for The Courier-Mail, a Queensland cricket selector from 1965–66 to 1975–76, and a coach.

McLaughlin also played baseball for Queensland.

The No.1 playing oval at Graceville Memorial Park was named the John "Jack" McLaughlin Oval in 2023 in honour of his lifelong service to cricket and the local community.

== See also ==
- List of Queensland first-class cricketers
- List of cricketers called for throwing in top-class cricket matches in Australia
