= List of international cricketers called for throwing =

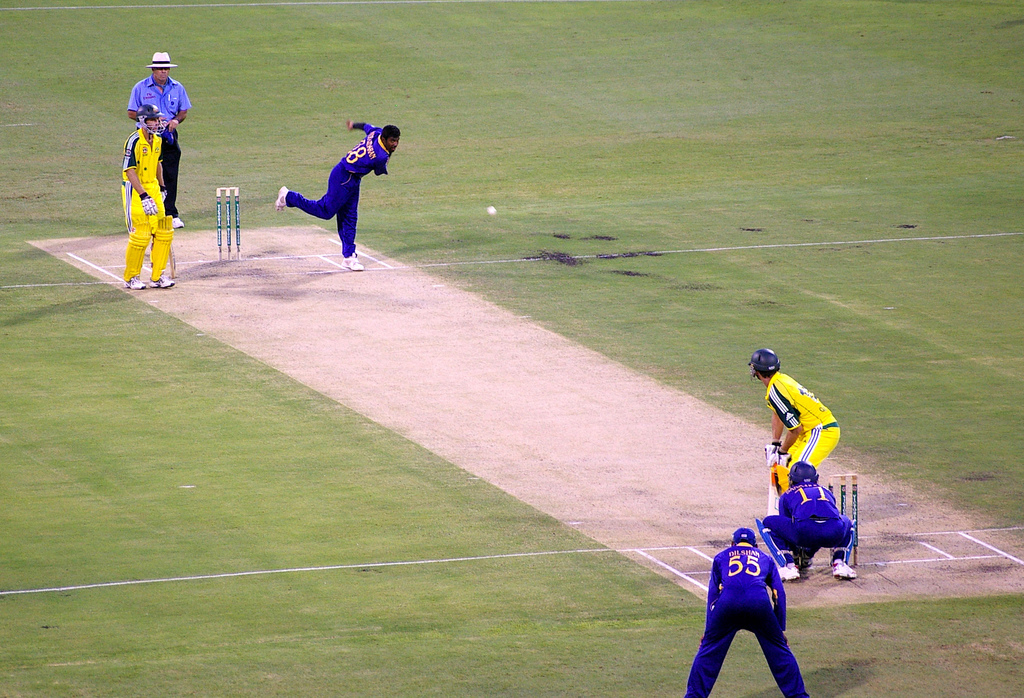
Muttiah Muralitharan bowling in a One Day International against Australia in early 2006. Just over a decade earlier, also in Australia, he was called for throwing twice in ten days by two different umpires—Darrell Hair and Ross Emerson.

In the sport of cricket, strict rules govern the method of bowling the ball. The rules relates to the bending of the arm at the elbow, the extent of which has always been open to interpretation by the umpires. More recently, the ICC has attempted to codify the maximum permissible flexing of the elbow as 15 degrees.

When a player is found by the umpire to have delivered the ball contrary to those rules, the umpire will call a no-ball and he is said to have been called for throwing. Where public opinion is that a player's bowling action appears to be that he routinely throws, he is said to have a suspect or an illegal action, or more derogatorily, he is said to be a chucker. The issue is often highly emotive with accusers considering that deliveries with an illegal action are akin to cheating.

Over the years, a number of players have been called in Test cricket and One Day Internationals, invariably creating controversy and occasionally destroying cricket careers. Often the player has been able to modify his action to appease his critics and the umpires, but more commonly, especially when the bowler has been called on more than one occasion, his career in international cricket is effectively ended.

For many spinners, especially off-spinners, they are susceptible to be called for throwing when they have a front-on approach because the elbow gets in front of the wrist upon release, especially bowling doosra.

== Cricketers called for throwing in a match ==
Those marked in bold were called for throwing in a Test match.

- **Ernie Jones** (AUS) – called in 1898 at Melbourne
- C. B. Fry (ENG) – called three times in 1898 and then in 1900 by umpire Jim Phillips
- Arthur Mold (ENG) – called in 1900 by umpire Jim Phillips and again in 1901
- Madhusudan Rege (IND) – called in 1951 playing for Maharashtra v MCC (first Indian player to be called for throwing)
- Cuan McCarthy (RSA) – called in 1952
- Doug Insole (ENG) – called in 1952
- **Tony Lock** (ENG) – called in 1952 and 1953–54
- Keith Slater (AUS) – called in 1957–58 and 1964–65
- Harold Rhodes (ENG) – called in 1960 and 1965
- **Geoffrey Griffin** (RSA) – called in the Currie Cup in 1959-60 and 1960 at London
- Butch White (ENG) – called in 1960 and in 1965 (though latter was a joke ball)
- Reg Simpson (ENG) – called in 1960
- **Haseeb Ahsan** (PAK) – called in Bombay in 1960–61
- Charlie Griffith (WI) – called in 1961–62 and 1966
- **Ian Meckiff** (AUS) – called in November 1963 by umpire Colin Egar at Brisbane
- Ian Redpath (AUS) – called in 1964
- **Abid Ali** (IND) – called in Christchurch in 1968
- Jim Higgs (AUS) – called in 1975
- Bruce Yardley (AUS) – called in 1977–78
- Syed Kirmani (IND) – called in Bridgetown in 1983
- **David Gower** (ENG) – called in Nottingham in 1986. New Zealand needed one run to win with eight wickets left so Gower put himself on and bowled one joke ball to give New Zealand the winning runs.
- **Henry Olonga** (ZIM) – called in Harare in 1995
- **Grant Flower** (ZIM) – called in Bulawayo in 2000
- **Muttiah Muralitharan** (SL) – called in December 1995 by umpire Darrell Hair at Melbourne, January 1996 by umpires Tony McQuillan and Ross Emerson in Brisbane, and January 1999 by Ross Emerson in Adelaide – He demonstrated he is capable of bowling with a legal action by wearing a steel reinforced plaster-of-Paris arm guard (which works as a shield against him bending his arm) and bowling all his deliveries correctly. However, the calls for throwing were shown to be quite correct when tests showed a 14 degree bend when delivering the doosra, compared with the maximum under the then rules of 5 degrees. The rule was then changed to allow up to 15 degrees of bend.

== Cricketers not called in a match ==
Players who have been reported to the ICC because of official concerns about their bowling actions but never called in a match. They were all cleared to continue bowling without sanction.

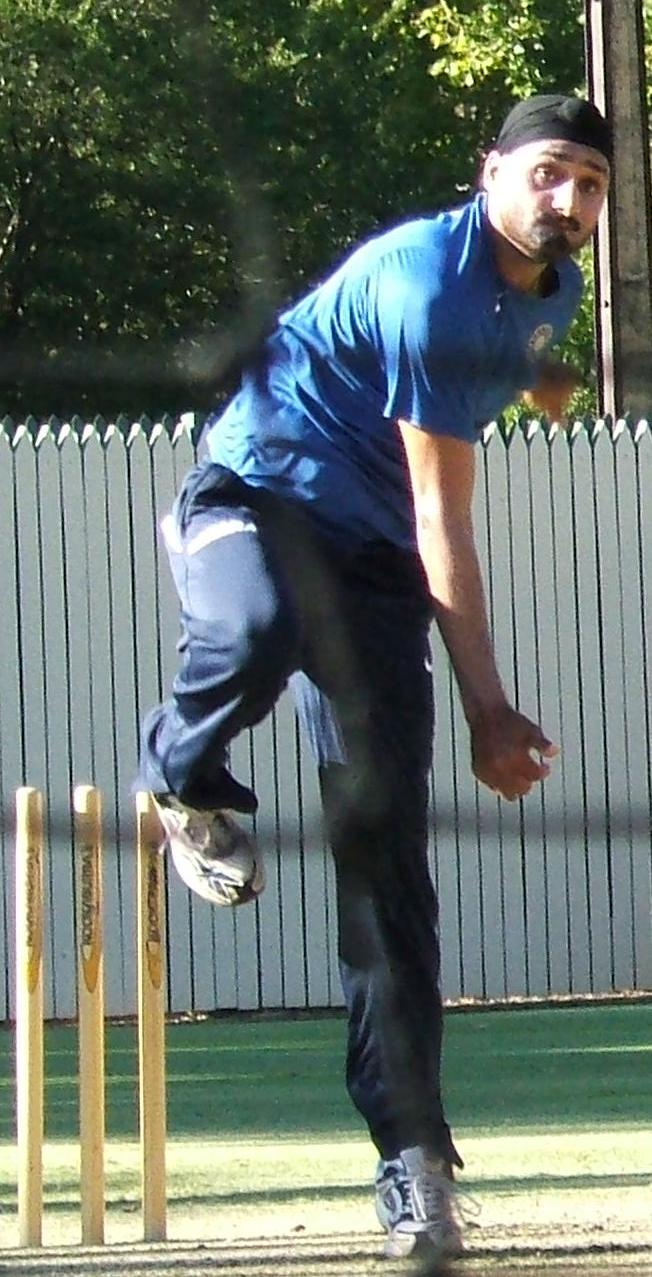
Harbhajan, pictured here bowling in the nets.

- Kumar Dharmasena (SL)
- Mohammad Hafeez (PAK)
- Jermaine Lawson (WI)
- Brett Lee (AUS)
- Shoaib Akhtar (PAK)
- Shoaib Malik (PAK)
- Harbhajan Singh (IND)
- Shaminda Eranga (SL)
- Sunil Narine (WI)

== Cricketers called in a match and sanctioned ==
Players who have been reported to the ICC because of official concerns about their bowling actions and subsequently sanctioned.

- Shoaib Akhtar (PAK) – in December 1999 but overturned almost immediately
- Shabbir Ahmed (PAK) – in December 2005 for 12 months, previously reported in 1999, 2004 and twice in 2005, including the 12-month ban.
- James Kirtley (ENG) – in October 2005 by England and Wales Cricket Board, also reported by umpire in the ODI debut in 2001
- Johan Botha (RSA) – in February 2006 by ICC until passing a subsequent test to prove that action has been rectified. In November 2006, he was cleared to resume bowling at international level. He was again reported in April 2009, and his doosra was banned.
- Abdur Razzak (BAN) – December 2008 but lifted in March 2009.
- Shane Shillingford (WI) – reported in November 2010, banned in December 2010, but cleared to play in June 2011 following remedial work.
- Shane Shillingford (WI) – reported in November 2013 again, banned in December 2013.
- Marlon Samuels (WI) – banned in December 2013 by the testing facility; however ICC ruled only his quicker deliveries illegal.

In March 2014, following an intellectual property dispute surrounding upper limb modelling protocols, the University of Western Australia withdraws its services to International Cricket Council and the ICC take all testing in house.

- Sachithra Senanayake (SL) – banned in July 2014, cleared in December 2014 following remedial work, particularly his bowling approach to be more side-on.
- Kane Williamson (NZ) – banned in July 2014, cleared in December 2014 following remedial work, particularly his bowling approach to be more side-on.
- Saeed Ajmal (PAK) – banned in September 2014.
- Prosper Utseya (ZIM) – banned in October 2014.
- Sohag Gazi (BAN) – banned in October 2014.
- Taskin Ahmed and Arafat Sunny (BAN) – banned in March 2016 during ICC World Twenty20

== See also ==
- List of cricketers called for throwing in senior cricket matches in Australia
