= Geoff Foley =

Australian cricketer

Personal information
- Full name: Geoffrey Ian Foley
- Born: 11 October 1967 (age 59); Jandowae, Queensland
- Nickname: Axle, Ian, Baker, Chuckers
- Batting: Left-handed
- Bowling: Right-arm medium
- Role: All rounder

Domestic team information
- Years: Team
- 1989/90–2000/01: Queensland
- 1996–1997: MCC
- 2000: Cheshire

Career statistics
Competition	First-class	List A
Matches	65	50
Runs scored	2,846	962
Batting average	30.60	28.29
100s/50s	2/16	0/6
Top score	155	66
Balls bowled	4,619	1,339
Wickets	44	33
Bowling average	54.70	30.93
5 wickets in innings	1	0
10 wickets in match	0	0
Best bowling	5/25	4/34
Catches/stumpings	72/–	16/0
- Source: ESPNcricinfo, 4 May 2019

Geoffrey Ian Foley (born 11 October 1967) is a former Australian cricketer. He was an all-rounder who played for the Queensland Bulls in Australia between 1989 and 2000, as well as seasons in England. He was no-balled for throwing by umpire Ross Emerson in a Sheffield Shield match in 1998 against Tasmania.

== See also ==
- List of cricketers called for throwing in top-class cricket matches in Australia
