= Barry Fisher =

Australian cricketer

Personal information
- Full name: Barry Fisher
- Born: 20 January 1934; Brisbane, Queensland, Australia
- Died: 6 April 1980 (aged 46); Inverell, New South Wales, Australia
- Batting: Right-handed
- Bowling: Right-arm fast-medium
- Role: Bowling all-rounder

Domestic team information
- Years: Team
- 1954/55–1967/68: Queensland

Career statistics
Competition	First-class
Matches	56
Runs scored	1,369
Batting average	21.06
100s/50s	1/5
Top score	103
Balls bowled	9,515
Wickets	126
Bowling average	32.15
5 wickets in innings	4
10 wickets in match	0
Best bowling	6/41
Catches/stumpings	26/–
- Source: cricinfo.com, 18 December 2007

Barry Fisher (20 January 1934 – 6 April 1980) was an Australian first class cricketer who played for Queensland from 1954–55 until 1967–68. A right arm fast bowler, he played 56 matches and briefly was seen as a future Australian Test prospect after being selected for an Australian Second XI tour of New Zealand in 1959–60. His first-class career ended after he was no-balled for throwing in November 1967.

== Biography ==
Fisher was born into a cricketing family; his father Alexander played three matches for Queensland in the 1930s. Fisher modelled his action on the great Australian bowler Ray Lindwall who was widely regarded as the best fast bowler of the late 1940s and early 1950s. Lindwall had a classical side on action which imparted outswing at high pace. Fisher made his first-class debut for Queensland against New South Wales during the 1954–55 season when Lindwall was on international duty and left a vacancy in the team. Fisher made an impressive debut, taking match figures of 8/128. Fisher was unable to hold down a regular place in the Queensland side until 1957–58 season.

Fisher had a metal pin inserted into his left shoulder in 1952 to prevent it from being dislocated, but he still suffered persistent shoulder problems. He was a useful lower order batsman who batted in the number 9 position, and scored his only first-class hundred of 103 against Victoria in the 1957–58 season. Strong performances saw Fisher selected in an Australian XI that played against the English cricket team during their 1958–59 tour of Australia leading up to the Tests. Such teams were used to trial prospective Test players. Fisher also shared the new ball with Lindwall for Queensland when the latter was not playing for Australia. The following year in 1959–60, while the Australian Test team toured the Indian subcontinent, Fisher was selected for a Second XI tour of New Zealand under Ian Craig. In 1962–63, Fisher had a notable performance of 5/18 in one match against New South Wales, helping to bowl them out for 82. He retired at the end of the season, but made a comeback in the 1967–68 season.

The first of two matches that Fisher played in his comeback was against New South Wales at Brisbane. He was used only sparingly but claimed the wicket of newly retired Australian Test captain Bob Simpson in the second innings. Fisher played in the return match between the two sides at the Sydney Cricket Ground in November 1967. Simpson was in an aggressive mood and had reached 243 not out at the end of the first day, with the home side on 3/399. Fisher and his bowling colleagues had conceded many runs. Umpire Ted Wykes no-balled Fisher from square leg during his third over, a decision which stunned Fisher. He later declared "I've bowled 1,100 overs in Shield cricket without being called by an umpire". At the end of match in which he took 0/111 in 20 overs as Queensland fell to an innings defeat, Fisher went into retirement, this time permanently.

Fisher later moved to northern New South Wales, where he operated a hotel. He died by suicide after his marriage had failed.

== See also ==
- List of cricketers called for throwing in top-class cricket matches in Australia
