= Harold Cotton =

Harold Cotton may refer to:

- Harold Cotton (ice hockey) (1902–1984), Canadian ice hockey player
- Harold Cotton (cricketer) (1914–1966), Australian cricketer
