= Ron Halcombe =

Australian cricketer (1906–1993)

Personal information
- Full name: Ronald Andrewes Halcombe
- Born: 19 March 1906; Petersburg, South Australia
- Died: 1 August 1993 (aged 87); Geelong, Victoria
- Batting: Right-handed
- Bowling: Right-arm fast
- Role: Bowler

Domestic team information
- Years: Team
- 1926/27–1927/28: South Australia
- 1928/29–1939/40: Western Australia

Career statistics
Competition	First-class
Matches	25
Runs scored	100
Batting average	5.00
100s/50s	0/0
Top score	14*
Balls bowled	4,230
Wickets	54
Bowling average	38.01
5 wickets in innings	1
10 wickets in match	0
Best bowling	5/40
Catches/stumpings	7/–
- Source: CricInfo, 18 December 2007

Ronald Andrewes Halcombe (19 March 1906 – 1 August 1993) was a first-class cricketer who represented South Australia and Western Australia in a career spanning from 1926/27 to 1939/40.

A right-arm fast bowler, Halcombe moved from South Australia to Western Australia after two seasons due to a lack of opportunity. With more regular selection on the field, Halcombe was considered a leading contender to become his state's first ever representative for Australia in Test cricket due to his express pace, but his career was derailed after he was no-balled for throwing in two consecutive matches in early 1930.

Some solid performances in the early 1930s led to rumours that he would be brought into the Australian team in order to retaliate against England's Bodyline tactics during the 1932–33 Ashes series. However, this never eventuated and thereafter Halcombe increasingly found state selection hard to come by. In retirement he became a well known sports commentator for the Australian Broadcasting Commission, providing description of cricket and Australian rules football matches until his retirement from the media in 1968.

== Early years ==
Halcombe grew up in South Australia, and studied at St Peter's College, Adelaide in his youth. There he earned the attention of cricket watchers for his fast-bowling skill and his suspect action. Halcombe was suspected of throwing, meaning an illegal bowling action in which a player straightens his arm in the process of delivering the ball, thereby throwing it, whereas the laws of cricket require that a bowler does not change the angle of his elbow in delivering the ball. In 1923, while still a schoolboy, he was observed by former England captain Archie MacLaren (who was then visiting Australia as part of the Marylebone Cricket Club team) and former Australia captain and all-rounder George Giffen. To test the legitimacy of Halcombe's action, his wrist, forearm and elbow were encased in splints, so that he could not move his elbow position. He delivered balls at varying speeds, and the experts failed to detect an illegal action.

Halcombe made his first-class debut during the 1926–27 season, playing four matches for South Australia. He made his debut against Queensland. He was unbeaten without scoring in his first innings as South Australia made 579. Halcombe then took 2/37 as Queensland made 251 and were forced to follow on. He conceded 58 runs without taking a wicket in the second innings, but his team nevertheless won by ten wickets.

In the next match against Victoria, he took 2/60 in the first innings before making his first first-class run, scoring an unbeaten one. He then went wicketless in the second innings as Victoria piled on 649 runs and won by 571 runs, with Halcombe unable to bat due to injury. Halcombe's two other games were against Western Australia; he took match figures of 3/62 and 5/95 as South Australia won both matches. His best innings performance was 4/61 in the second innings of the latter match, which saw Western Australia bowled out for 265. Halcombe ended the season with 12 wickets at 30.17 and three runs at an average of 3.00.

During the 1927–28 season, Halcombe was selected in only one match, taking 1/119 as South Australia were defeated by Victoria by an innings and 310 runs. He scored three not out and a duck in the match. After playing only one match in the previous season, Halcombe transferred to Western Australia. During his time in South Australia, Halcombe had played in matches officiated by Test umpire George Hele without his action being called into question. Of short stature for a fast bowler, Halcombe generated high pace from a short run-up.

Halcombe's first match for his new state in 1928–29 was against the touring England cricket team. He took 3/114 as the tourists compiled 406 in a drawn match. He took the wickets of leading batsmen Ernest Tyldesley, Douglas Jardine and Herbert Sutcliffe. During the second innings of the match against England, Halcombe struck George Geary in the head with a bouncer, forcing him to be carried from the field. This drew further attention to Halcombe's bowling action. Halcombe was dropped to the colts (youth) team, and he promptly bowled them to victory against South Australia with 6/31 and 6/32. After taking match figures of 3/77 against Victoria Colts, Halcombe played his second first-class fixture of the season when Australian selectors selected him for an Australian XI against England at the end of the season. He took 2/50 in a drawn match, his wickets being Maurice Tate and Maurice Leyland.

== Move to Western Australia and throwing incidents ==
During the 1929–30 season, Halcombe's career appeared to be on the up when he was selected for a trial match that was used to select Australia's Test team for the 1930 tour of England. In his first match of the season against the Marylebone Cricket Club, Halcombe took 3/35 and 2/30, including noted batsman Frank Woolley, but was unable to prevent a seven-wicket defeat.

However, his career turned sour in a match against Victoria in January 1930. After contributing three not out in Western Australia's first innings of 187, Halcombe opened the bowling for Western Australia from the pavilion end of the Melbourne Cricket Ground. He delivered the first three balls to Clive Sindrey who took a single from the third ball. Leo O'Brien then faced Halcombe and umpire Andrew Barlow no-balled Halcombe six times in succession from square leg. One of the balls struck O'Brien in the hand and forced him to retire with a burst blister on the palm, while another went for four byes. After the first two no-ball decisions, the Western Australian captain Richard Bryant conferred with Barlow, but when Halcombe resumed, the umpire continued to call him for throwing. After the sixth no-ball, Halcombe threw the ball to his skipper in disgust. After another discussion, he bowled at significantly reduced pace and completed his over. Victoria took a lead of 22, before Western Australia compiled 311, with Halcombe scoring 10 not out. With Halcombe out of the attack, Victoria went on to win by four wickets.

Despite the incident regarding Halcombe's legitimacy, Halcombe was selected for Western Australia's following match, which was against Tasmania. It was the first match between the two states and raised an issue of cricket diplomacy. In welcoming his visitors, Lieutenant Colonel L. M. Mullen, chairman of the Tasmanian Cricket Association stated that he viewed the match as a "Test" and that it was regarded as a notable even in the history of Australian cricket. The Western Australian manager Alf Randall replied that he eagerly awaited the day when each Australian state played in the Sheffield Shield – Tasmania did not gain admittance until the 1970s. It was believed that although there was pressure for Halcombe to be omitted, the Western Australian leadership wanted other umpires in other states to analyse his action in a match situation. According to Randall, leading Australian Test batsman of the day Bill Ponsford and former player turned journalist Jack Worrall regarded Halcombe as legitimate so it was reasoned by the Western Australians that there were no grounds to exclude Halcombe.

During the match, Halcombe was twice no-balled by umpire A. J. Buttsworth on the first day, and then ten times in succession by umpire Walter Lonergan. This did not occur when Halcombe was switched to the opposite end. The match at Hobart's TCA ground had seen Western Australia bat first and compile 248 before being dismissed late on the first day, with Halcombe scoring three. After the change of innings, Tasmanian openers Jim "Snowy" Atkinson and Alf Rushforth started their innings at 17:10 local time with Rushworth taking strike to Halcombe, who ran in from the pavilion end. Buttsworth called Halcombe from square leg on the third ball. Halcombe was bowling at such a pace that the wicket-keeper and slips were standing about 20 metres behind the stumps. Lonergan, standing at the bowler's end, also no-balled Halcombe for dragging his back foot over the crease. On the eighth ball, Buttsworth called Halcombe for another throw. After Alex Webster bowled an over from the other end, Halcombe continued from the pavilion end and was greeted with applause from the crowd. Halcombe sent down another two overs without incident.

The second day started dramatically when Halcombe bowled from the opposite end and bowled the second over of the day, with Lonergan standing at square leg. His first ball was deemed to be legitimate but from then on there was a continuous call of no-ball, for ten consecutive deliveries. Halcombe then substantially reduced his pace and completed the over after 18 balls. Although Bryant did not switch Halcombe to the other end in the first match, he did so on this occasion. Halcombe continued bowling and there were no further no-ball calls. During the ten consecutive no-balls, Lonergan had remained firm despite continuous heckling from a section of the crowd who showed their support of the bowler. Halcombe persevered and ended the innings with 3/61 from 20 overs. His action was much discussed, in particular his faster ball. The opening batsmen Rushforth and Atkinson played Halcombe in a diplomatic manner, making little effort to attack his bowling in the midst of the throwing calls.

Tasmania took a 42-run lead and Western Australia made 7/303 before declaring, with Halcombe not being required to bat. Halcombe went on to bowl two overs without incident in the second innings of the match as Tasmania ended at 1/42 when time ran out. Much anticipation surrounded his return to his home town of Adelaide the following week for a match against South Australia, with one of the umpires being Hele. Halcombe spoke in an interview to Adelaide's Advertiser in which he declared that he was adamant that his bowling was "quite legal". Halcombe asserted that only one of the eight deliveries that he bowled under a slow motion camera could be considered to be of a doubtful nature. Halcombe again passed Hele's scrutiny unscathed, but his bowling failed to worry the South Australians, who plundered 100 runs from 13 overs for the loss of only one wicket. To make things worse, Halcombe made a pair as his team crashed to defeat by an innings and 234 runs. Debate over the legality of his action continued during the season, with former umpire Bob Crockett supporting his no-balling while former Test captain Joe Darling disagreed. Halcombe was the first player in top-class cricket in Australia to be called for throwing by three different umpires.

In the final match of the season, Halcombe represented Western Australia against the 1930 Australian team, who were warming up for the 1930 tour of England. Halcombe bowled nine wicketless overs for 47 runs, as the national team won by an innings with 25 runs. He was unbeaten in both innings, not scoring in the first innings and making his highest first-class score of 14 in the second. He ended the season with nine wickets at 31.33 and 34 runs at 8.50.

== Later career ==
Halcombe's career continued after that time without further throwing controversies, but he never again threatened for national selection. He was overlooked for selection in the 1930–31 season, not playing a single first-class match. In the following season, he was only selected for one match, against the touring South Africans, taking 3/114 as the tourists won by an innings and 242 runs. He scored five not out and five respectively.

During the 1932–33 season that saw England tour Australia under Douglas Jardine with their Bodyline tactics, which involved bowling high speed deliveries at the batsmen's body, rumours circulated that Halcombe could be selected for the Tests. Halcombe's pace saw him touted as a possible retaliatory outlet against the English. At the beginning of the season, Halcombe played for Western Australia in a tour match against England. He took 3/48 and 1/38 in a drawn match, including the Bodyline mastermind and captain Douglas Jardine, Bob Wyatt, Les Ames and the Nawab of Pataudi. He was then called into the Australian XI in a subsequent tour match. He was less successful on this occasion, taking 1/81 as England scored 7/583. Halcombe was not selected for any other first-class matches during the season.

The following season, Halcombe was only selected for Western Australia once, against the 1934 Australian team, who were warming up for the 1934 tour of England at the end of the 1933–34 Australian season. He scored 11 and took 2/57, including the wicket of captain Bill Woodfull. During the 1934–35 season, Halcombe played in two matches, both against New South Wales near the end of the season. He took match figures of 0/57 and 2/81 as both matches were drawn.

During the 1935–36 season, Halcombe played in two matches, both at the start of the season. He took 0/100 against the Australian team, who were warming up for the 1935–36 tour of South Africa. Western Australia won by an innings and 249 runs. After taking match figures of 0/90 against the touring MCC, he was dropped for the remainder of the season, thereby ending it without a wicket. The following season was a similar tale. After taking match figures of 1/108 and 4/161 in two matches against the touring England team at the start of the summer, Halcombe was dropped for the remainder of the season.

Halcombe only played one first-class match in each of the following three seasons. He took 3/43 against Australia at the end of the 1937–38 season, including vice-captain Stan McCabe, before taking his career-best innings figures of 5/40 against Victoria in the following season. In his final season, 1939–40, Halcombe took 2/51 and 0/39 in his only match against South Australia. After that, first-class cricket was interrupted until 1945–46 by World War II, during which Halcombe served in the Australian Army from 26 June 1942 to 27 August 1944, at the time of his discharge he was a lieutenant in the 11th Battalion.

== Media career ==
After his cricket career ended, Halcombe had a successful career as a sports broadcaster. In 1947 he was appointed as the sports supervisor for the Australian Broadcasting Commission in Perth. He was Western Australia's first full-time sports broadcaster, a position that he filled until his retirement in 1968. Halcombe won a strong personal following for his flamboyant description of cricket and Australian rules football matches. He also conducted regular segments on his Saturday sports programs such as "Strange but True" and "People I Met This Week". He developed a reputation as a raconteur and had a habit of rummaging through old newspapers in search of sporting items. Halcombe travelled widely throughout the state to interview notable sports personalities and presented his broadcasts in a distinctive humorous style. He was particularly remembered for his commentary partnerships with Johnnie Moyes and Englishman Arthur Gilligan during English tours to Australia.

== See also ==
- List of cricketers called for throwing in top-class cricket matches in Australia
