= Eddie Illingworth =

Australian cricketer (1938–2026)

Personal information
- Full name: Edward Philip Illingworth
- Born: 27 November 1938; Fairfield, Victoria, Australia
- Died: 7 March 2026 (aged 87); Melbourne, Victoria, Australia
- Batting: Left-handed
- Bowling: Right-arm fast-medium
- Role: Bowler

Domestic team information
- Years: Team
- 1961–62 – 1964–65: Victoria

Career statistics
Competition	First-class
Matches	5
Runs scored	155
Batting average	17.22
100s/50s	0/0
Top score	47
Balls bowled	1,120
Wickets	15
Bowling average	27.60
5 wickets in innings	0
10 wickets in match	0
Best bowling	4/28
Catches/stumpings	1/–
- Source: CricketArchive, 20 December 2007

Edward Philip Illingworth (27 November 1938 – 7 March 2026) was an Australian cricketer who played five first-class matches for Victoria between 1962 and 1964. A right-arm medium pace bowler, Illingworth was best remembered for being no-balled for throwing in a Sheffield Shield match against South Australia in November 1964 by umpires Col Egar and Jack Ryan. His selection for Victoria was made more controversial by the fact that he had been called at district level for throwing prior to his first-class debut. Away from first-class cricket, Illingworth had a successful career for Fitzroy in Victorian Premier Cricket, where he remains the eighth highest wicket-taker of all time, with 599. He was named the club champion three times, and later served for seven years as a board member of the Victorian Cricket Association.

== Early career ==
During his career in local cricket, Illingworth played for Fitzroy in Victorian Premier Cricket. He made his debut in the first-grade team in the 1957–58 season. He was to represent them for 20 years, playing a total of 233 matches. In December 1959, Illingworth was selected for the Victoria Colts, a youth team, to play against the New South Wales Colts. Illingworth scored a pair and opened the bowling, taking 1/51 as New South Wales made 278 in their only innings of a drawn match.

Two years later, in November 1961, Illingworth was selected for Jack Potter's XI in an invitational one-day single innings match against Bill Lawry's XI at Junction Oval. Both sides featured current Test players, including Lawry, Ian Meckiff and Lindsay Kline. Illingworth made 17 as Potter's men were bowled out for 125, before bowling nine wicketless overs for 34 runs as Lawry's side made 9/279, having reached the target with eight wickets intact.

== First-class debut ==
Illingworth was selected to make his first-class début for Victoria against Tasmania at Kardinia Park in Geelong in February 1962. His selection had generated controversy since he had twice been no-balled for throwing by two different umpires in Melbourne district cricket in the two seasons prior to his selection. One of the occasions in district cricket, he had been no-balled three times in one over. At the time, Tasmania were not in the Sheffield Shield competition, so it was a one-off match.

Victoria won the toss and elected to bat. Illingworth came to the crease at 7/109 and scored 22 before being dismissed at 8/154 his team were bowled out for 214. He then took 3/43, all of his victims being top seven batsmen, as the hosts bowled Tasmania out for 119 to take a 95-run lead. He then made four as Victoria made 8/286 declared, leaving Tasmania with a target of 392. Illingworth took his career best figures of 4/28, removing Tasmania's first four batsmen, as his team took a 190-run win.

Despite this performance, Illingworth was overlooked for further state selection for over two years. Returning to play for Fitzroy in district cricket, he took 63 wickets at 13.76 in the 1963–64 season, making him the leading wicket-taker for the season across the entire competition. He finally returned to the state team in late 1964, during the 1964–65 season. In a trial match at the start of the season against Sunraysia Cricket Association in the regional town of Mildura, Illingworth opened the bowling and took 1/15 from eight overs as Victoria took a 117-run win in the one-day match.

He was then selected to make his Sheffield Shield debut a week later, against Western Australia at the WACA Ground in Perth. Illingworth came in at 6/168 and made 25 before being run out in his team's 208. Bowling first change, he dismissed both openers to leave the hosts at 2/60, before they recovered to take a 183-run lead. Illingworth ended with 2/53. He then scored 14 as Victoria set a target of 180. Illingworth then took 0/20 from ten overs before time ran out with Western Australia on 1/50.

== No ball for throwing ==
Illingworth's best performance in a Sheffield Shield match was against South Australia at the Adelaide Oval in the following week of November 1964, which was the same match in which he was called. The home side won the toss and elected to bat first.

Illingworth took 4/92 in South Australia's first innings but was no-balled a total of three times by Egar and Ryan. Illingworth was called on each of the occasions by the umpire standing at square leg. He was called twice by Egar on the second and fourth deliveries of his eleventh over, and once by Ryan on the sixth ball of his fourteenth over. In the same fourteenth over, Illingworth had dismissed former Pakistani Test batsman Duncan Sharpe and Australian Test wicket-keeper Barry Jarman from the first and fourth deliveries respectively. This broke a 97-run stand between Sharpe and Ian Chappell, before Jarman was removed for a duck. After 17 more runs were added, Illingworth had Chappell caught behind for 127. South Australia eventually finished at 392.

Victoria then batted. Illingworth made 22 of his team's 144 after they fell to 6/100. They were forced to follow on, having conceded a 248-run lead in their first innings. Victoria had to try to stave off defeat and they were in trouble when Illingworth came in to bat, partnering captain Bill Lawry after wicket-keeper Ray Jordon was out with the score at 6/193. Illingworth scored his highest first-class score of 47, putting on a partnership of 87 runs with Lawry before he was dismissed with the score at 7/280. Victoria were 8/286 at the end of play, just 38 runs ahead, as the match ended in a draw.

== Later career ==
Illingworth played in two further matches, but only took two wickets. In the following match against Western Australia at the Melbourne Cricket Ground, he took 1/56, taking the wicket of Test player Keith Slater as Western Australia made 455. He made 10 as Victoria responded with 318, before bowling two overs for the concession of two runs as Western Australia reached 3/72 when time ran out.

Illingworth's final match was against Queensland in December 1964. He took 0/34 as Queensland batted first and made 270. After scoring seven of his team's 341, he took 1/86 as Queensland declared at 5/332. Chasing 261 for victory, Illingworth made four as his team lost by 40 runs. Illingworth ended his career with 15 wickets at an average of 27.60, and 155 runs at 17.22. The state selectors were reluctant to pick him for Victoria because of the throwing allegations that surrounded him.

Illingworth returned to district cricket and played another 13 seasons with Fitzroy until finishing his career after the 1977–78 season, having played 233 matches. He took 599 wickets at 18.60 for Fitzroy, placing him eighth on the all-time wicket-takers list in Victorian Premier Cricket. His best bowling figures in an innings were 8/18 and he took five wickets in an innings 26 times, and ten wickets in a match three times. He also amassed 2666 runs at 14.03 and took 91 catches. He was part of two premierships in his career, with Fitzroy winning in 1960–61 and 1966–67. Illingworth was voted the club champion three times, winning the Arthur Liddicut Medal in 1972–73, 1973–74 and 1976–77. He was an honorary life member of the club.

From 1970–71 to 1977–78, Illingworth served as Fitzroy's delegate on the Victorian Cricket Association's board of directors.

== Death ==
Illingworth died in Melbourne on 7 March 2026, at the age of 87.

== See also ==
- List of cricketers called for throwing in top-class cricket matches in Australia
