= Gordon Brooks (cricketer) =

Australian cricketer (1938–2004)

Personal information
- Full name: Gordon Victor Brooks
- Born: 30 May 1938; Ceduna, South Australia
- Died: 31 January 2004 (aged 65); Brisbane, Queensland
- Batting: Right-handed
- Bowling: Right-arm fast-medium

Domestic team information
- Years: Team
- 1961/62–1963/64: South Australia

Career statistics
Competition	First-class
Matches	26
Runs scored	41
Batting average	2.56
100s/50s	0/0
Top score	6
Balls bowled	4,353
Wickets	61
Bowling average	33.26
5 wickets in innings	0
10 wickets in match	0
Best bowling	4/11
Catches/stumpings	13/–
- Source: Cricinfo, 26 August 2017

Gordon Victor Brooks (30 May 1938 – 31 January 2004) was an Australian cricketer who played 26 matches for South Australia between 1961 and 1964.

== See also ==
- List of cricketers called for throwing in top-class cricket matches in Australia
