= Ray Reynolds =

Australian cricketer (1936–2023)

Personal information
- Full name: George Raymond Reynolds
- Born: 24 August 1936; Bundaberg, Queensland, Australia
- Died: 24 September 2023 (aged 87)
- Height: 5 ft 6 in (1.68 m)
- Batting: Right-handed

Domestic team information
- Years: Team
- 1955–56 to 1963–64: Queensland

Career statistics
Competition	First-class
Matches	54
Runs scored	3693
Batting average	46.16
100s/50s	12/14
Top score	203 not out
Balls bowled	24
Wickets	0
Bowling average	–
5 wickets in innings	–
10 wickets in match	–
Best bowling	–
Catches/stumpings	19/1
- Source: Cricket Archive, 30 May 2014

George Raymond Reynolds (24 August 1936 – 24 September 2023) was an Australian cricketer who played first-class cricket for Queensland from 1955 to 1964.

== Life and career ==
Ray Reynolds was educated at Brisbane Church of England Grammar School. Five feet six inches tall, he was a "patient batsman with good concentration ... a neat stroke-player with a sound defensive technique". He made his first-class debut for Queensland in the 1955–56 season, batting at number seven. Later in the season he was promoted to the opening position. He missed the first two matches in 1956–57, but returned to the side to open the batting and finished the season with 371 runs at an average of 53.00, including his first century, 110 not out against South Australia after Queensland had followed on.

Reynolds improved further in 1957–58, leading Queensland's batting with 698 runs at 63.45. His season included three centuries, with his highest score of 203 not out against South Australia, when he batted throughout an innings of 452 for 8 declared; but he also twice made a pair. His innings of 174 against New South Wales took 515 minutes. He made a stumping while substituting as wicket-keeper in the match against Western Australia in Brisbane.

Reynolds continued to perform reliably over the next three seasons, scoring 500 runs at 38.46 in 1958–59, 671 runs at 39.47 in 1959–60, and 549 runs at 36.60 in 1960–61, forming a solid opening partnership with Sam Trimble.

Reynolds played two seasons in the Central Lancashire League for Royton, scoring 848 runs at 40.38 in 1962, and 836 runs at 41.80 in 1963. Unusually for a league professional, he did not bowl.

Reynolds returned for one last season with Queensland in 1963–64, scoring more heavily than ever, with 815 runs at 58.21, four centuries, and an opening partnership of 256 with Trimble against South Australia.

At the age of 27, he retired from the game to take up sugar cane farming near Bundaberg. He later served as a Queensland selector from 1979 to 1985.

Ray Reynolds died on 24 September 2023, at the age of 87.
