= Muttiah Muralitharan =

Sri Lankan cricketer (born 1972)

Deshabandu Muttiah Muralitharan
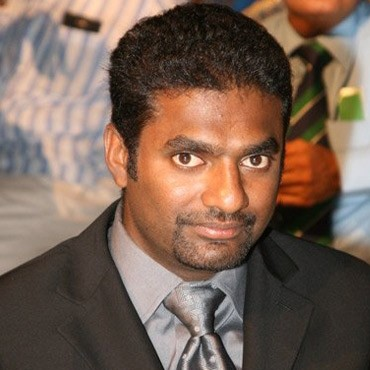
- Muralitharan at the CEAT Cricket Ratings Awards in February 2013

Personal information
- Born: 17 April 1972 (age 54); Kandy, Ceylon
- Nickname: Murali
- Height: 5 ft 5 in (165 cm)
- Batting: Right-handed
- Bowling: Right-arm off break
- Role: Bowler

International information
- National side: Sri Lanka (1992–2011)
- Test debut (cap 54): 28 August 1992 v Australia
- Last Test: 18 July 2010 v India
- ODI debut (cap 70): 12 August 1993 v India
- Last ODI: 2 April 2011 v India
- ODI shirt no.: 8
- T20I debut (cap 13): 22 December 2006 v New Zealand
- Last T20I: 31 October 2010 v Australia

Domestic team information
- Years: Team
- 1991/92–2009/10: Tamil Union
- 1999, 2001, 2005, 2007: Lancashire
- 2003: Kent
- 2008–2010: Chennai Super Kings
- 2011: Kochi Tuskers Kerala
- 2011–2012: Gloucestershire
- 2011/12: Wellington Firebirds
- 2011/12: Chittagong Kings
- 2012–2014: Royal Challengers Bangalore
- 2012/13–2013/14: Melbourne Renegades
- 2013: Jamaica Tallawahs

Career statistics
Competition	Test	ODI	FC	LA
Matches	133	350	232	453
Runs scored	1,256	674	2,192	945
Batting average	11.67	6.80	11.35	7.32
100s/50s	0/1	0/0	0/1	0/0
Top score	67	33*	67	33*
Balls bowled	44,039	18,811	66,933	23,734
Wickets	800	534	1,374	682
Bowling average	22.72	23.08	19.64	22.39
5 wickets in innings	67	10	119	12
10 wickets in match	22	0	34	0
Best bowling	9/51	7/30	9/51	7/30
Catches/stumpings	72/–	130/–	123/–	159/–
Medal record
Men's Cricket
Representing Sri Lanka
ICC Cricket World Cup
Winner	1996 India-Pakistan-Sri Lanka
Runner-up	2007 West Indies
Runner-up	2011 India–Bangladesh–Sri Lanka
ICC Champions Trophy
Winner	2002 Sri Lanka
ICC World Twenty20
Runner-up	2009 England
- Source: ESPNcricinfo, 8 January 2014

Deshabandu Muttiah Muralitharan (born 17 April 1972) is a Sri Lankan cricket coach, businessman and former professional cricketer. Averaging over six wickets per Test match, he is widely regarded as one of the greatest players in the history of the sport. He is the only bowler to take 800 Test wickets and more than 530 One Day International (ODI) wickets. As of 2026, he has taken more wickets in international cricket than any other bowler. Muralitharan was a part of the Sri Lankan team that won the 1996 Cricket World Cup and the team which was joint-winners with India of the 2002 ICC Champions Trophy.

Muralitharan's international career was beset by controversy over his bowling action. Due to an unusual hyperextension of his congenitally bent arm during delivery, his bowling action was called into question on a number of occasions by umpires and sections of the cricket community. After biomechanical analysis under simulated playing conditions, Muralitharan's action was cleared by the International Cricket Council, first in 1996 and again in 1999.

Muralitharan held the number one spot in the International Cricket Council's player rankings for Test bowlers for a record period of 1,711 days spanning 214 Test matches. He became the highest wicket-taker in Test cricket when he overtook the previous record-holder Shane Warne on 3 December 2007. Muralitharan had previously held the record when he surpassed Courtney Walsh's 519 wickets in 2004, but he suffered a shoulder injury later that year and was overtaken by Warne. Muralitharan took the wicket of Gautam Gambhir on 5 February 2009 in Colombo to surpass Wasim Akram's ODI record of 502 wickets. He retired from Test cricket in 2010, registering his 800th and final wicket on 22 July 2010 from his final ball in his last Test match.

Muralitharan was rated the greatest Test match bowler by Wisden's Cricketers' Almanack in 2002, and in 2017 was the first Sri Lankan cricketer to be inducted into the ICC Cricket Hall of Fame. He won the Ada Derana Sri Lankan of the Year award in 2017.

== Early years and personal life ==
Muralitharan was born 17 April 1972 to a Hill Country Tamil Hindu family in Kandy, Sri Lanka, the eldest of the four sons to Sinnasamy Muttiah and Lakshmi. Muralitharan's father, Sinnasamy Muttiah, runs a successful biscuit-making business. Muralitharan's paternal grandfather, Periyasamy Sinasamy, came from South India to work in the tea plantations of central Sri Lanka in 1920. Sinasamy later returned to the country of his birth with his daughters and settled in Tiruchirappalli, Tamil Nadu, India. However, his sons, including Muralitharan's father Muttiah, remained in Sri Lanka.

When he was nine years old, Muralitharan was sent to St. Anthony's College, Kandy, a private school run by Benedictine monks. He began his cricketing career as a medium pace bowler but on the advice of his school coach, Sunil Fernando, he took up off-spin when he was fourteen years old. He soon impressed and went on to play for four years in the school First XI. In those days he played as an all-rounder and batted in the middle order. In his final two seasons at St Anthony's College he took over one hundred wickets and in 1990–91 was named as the 'Bata Schoolboy Cricketer of the Year'.

After leaving school he joined Tamil Union Cricket and Athletic Club and was selected for the Sri Lanka A tour of England in 1991. He played in five games but failed to capture a single wicket. On his return to Sri Lanka he impressed against Allan Border's Australian team in a practice game and then went on to make his Test debut at R. Premadasa Stadium in the Second Test match of the series.

When his grandfather died at the age of 104 in July 2004, Muralitharan returned home from Asia Cup to attend his funeral. Periyasamy Sinasamy's first wish to see Muralitharan claiming the world record for the most Test wickets was realised (passing the record set by Courtney Walsh), but not his desire to live to see his grandson married. Muralitharan's grandmother had died one month earlier at the age of 97. Muralitharan's manager, Kushil Gunasekera, stated that "Murali's family is closely knit and united. They respect traditional values. The late grandfather enjoyed a great relationship with Murali."

Muralitharan married Madhimalar Ramamurthy, a Chennai native, on 21 March 2005. Madhimalar is the daughter of the late Dr S. Ramamurthy of Malar Hospitals, and his wife Dr Nithya Ramamurthy. Their first child, Naren, was born in January 2006.

Muralitharan holds Overseas Citizenship of India and he does not need a visa for travelling to India. According to his manager, Kushil Gunasekera, Muralitharan qualifies for this status because his family originates from India.

== Spelling of name ==
Even though his name was widely romanised as Muralitharan from the start of his career, he prefers the spelling Muralidaran. The different spellings have arisen because the Tamil letter த can be pronounced as both 't' and 'd' depending on its place in a word. It is often transliterated as 'th' to distinguish it from another letter, ட, which is a retroflex 't' or 'd'. In 2007, when Cricket Australia decided to unveil the new Warne-Muralidaran Trophy, to be contested between Australia and Sri Lanka, Muralitharan was requested to clarify how his name should be spelt. Cricket Australia spokesman Peter Young confirmed that "the spelling he's given is Muralidaran".

The first-day cover involving Muralitharan bears an official seal captioned as "The highest wicket taker in Test cricket, MUTHIAH MURALIDARAN, First Day of Issue 03.12.2007, Camp Post Office, Asgiriya International Cricket Stadium, Kandy".

== Domestic cricket ==
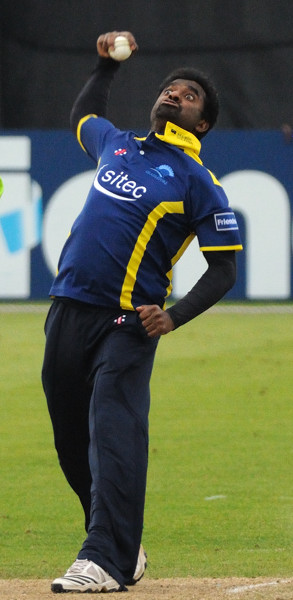
Muralitharan bowling for Gloucestershire in 2011.

=== In Sri Lanka ===
In domestic cricket, Muralitharan played for two first-class Sri Lankan teams, Tamil Union Cricket and Athletic Club in the Premier Trophy and Central Province in the Provincial Championship. His record is exceptional – 234 wickets at 14.51 runs in 46 matches.

=== In England ===
He also played county cricket in England, mainly for Lancashire (1999, 2001, 2005 and 2007), appearing in twenty-eight first-class games for the club. He played five first class games for Kent during the 2003 season. His bowling record in English domestic cricket is also exceptional – 236 wickets at 15.62 runs in 33 matches. Despite his efforts, he was never on a title-winning first-class domestic team in either the Premier Trophy or the County Championship. He was unusual amongst his contemporaries in that he played in more Test matches than other first-class games (116 Tests and 99 other first-class matches as of 30 November 2007). Muralitharan was signed by Gloucestershire in 2011 to play in T20 matches. He renewed his T20 contract with Gloucestershire in 2012, but did not stay on for the 2013 season.

=== In India ===
Muralitharan was contracted to represent Bengal in the 2008–09 Ranji Trophy tournament. He was expected to play about four matches in the tournament's second division – the Plate League.

In February 2008, Muralitharan was slated to play Twenty20 cricket for the Chennai Super Kings in the Indian Premier League (IPL). He was bought for $600,000 by India Cements, the Chennai franchisee of the IPL, through a bidding process. The Chennai Super Kings were the runners-up in the inaugural edition of the IPL, losing to the Rajasthan Royals in the final. Muralitharan captured 11 wickets in 15 games, at an economy rate of 6.96 an over. In 2010, in the third season of IPL, Muralitharan was part of the Chennai Super Kings team that won the IPL championship. Muralitharan also remained the team's leading wicket-taker after all the three tournaments.

At the 2011 IPL Player Auction Muralitharan was bought by Kochi Tuskers Kerala for US$1.1 million.

In the 2012 season Muralitharan moved to Royal Challengers Bangalore, where he took 14 wickets in 9 games and had an average economy rate of 6.38. He played for Royal Challengers Bangalore from 2012 to 2014. He decided to retire from the IPL in 2014.

In 2015, Muralitharan was appointed as the bowling coach and mentor of the IPL team Sunrisers Hyderabad.

=== In Australia ===
Muttiah Muralitharan signed for the Melbourne Renegades to play Twenty20 cricket in the Big Bash League in 2012. He stated, "I wanted to play one season in Australia and the opportunity from the Melbourne Renegades was there so I took it with both hands."

== International career ==
=== Bowling style and career progress ===
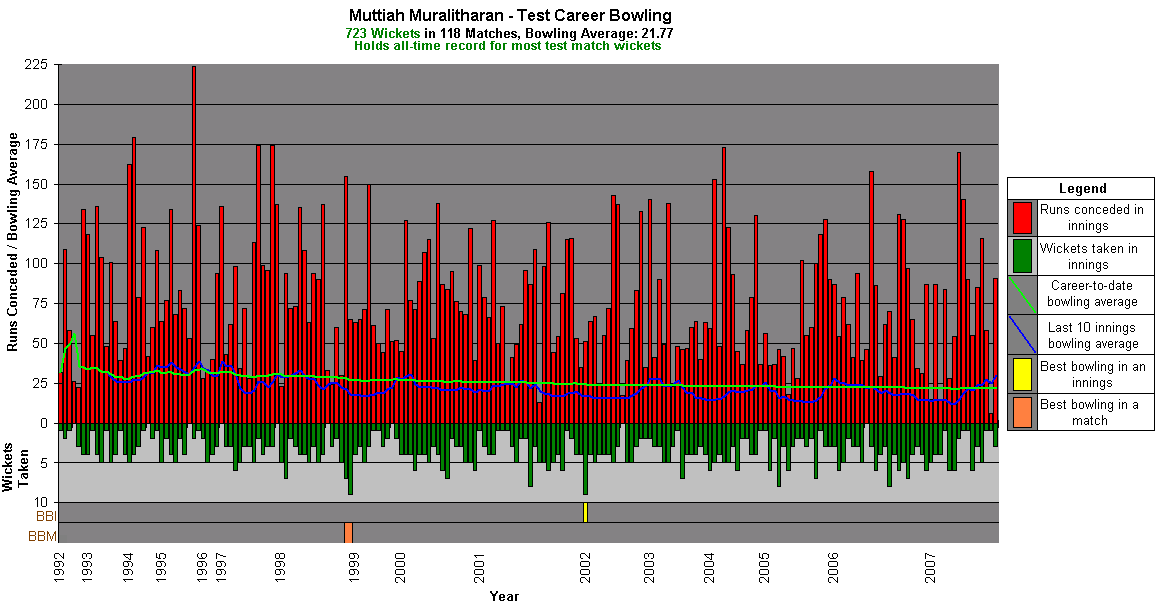
A graph showing Muralitharan's Test career bowling statistics and how they have varied over time

Muralitharan is the first wrist-spinning off-spinner in the history of the game. He bowls marathon spells, yet he is usually on the attack. His unique bowling action begins with a short run-up, and culminates with an open-chested extremely wristy release from a partly supinated forearm which had him mistaken for a leg-spinner early in his career by Allan Border. Aside from his stock delivery, the off-break, of which he claimed to have two variations (during a recorded television 'doosra' show off with Mark Nicholas from Channel 4 in 2004), his main deliveries are a fast topspinner which lands on the seam and usually goes straight on, and the doosra, a surprise delivery which turns from leg to off (the opposite direction of his stock delivery) with no easily discernible change of action. Additionally, he would occasionally use one of his several unnamed novelties. His super-flexible wrist makes him especially potent and guarantees him turn on any surface.

From his debut in 1992, Muralitharan took 800 Test wickets and over 500 One Day International wickets, becoming the first player to take 1,000 wickets combined in the two main forms of international cricket.

=== Test cricket ===
==== Emerging years ====
On 28 August 1992 at the age of 20, Muralitharan made his debut against Australia at the Khettarama Stadium and claimed 3 for 141. Craig McDermott was his first Test wicket.

In August 1993 at Moratuwa, Muralitharan captured 5 for 104 in South Africa's first innings, his first five-wicket haul in Tests. His wickets included Kepler Wessels, Hansie Cronje and Jonty Rhodes.

Prior to the eventful Boxing Day Test of 1995, Muralitharan had captured 80 wickets in 22 Tests at an unflattering average of 32.74. Even at that point in his career he was the leading wicket taker for Sri Lanka having gone past Rumesh Ratnayake's aggregate of 73 wickets.

==== Boxing Day Test 1995 ====
During the second Test between Sri Lanka and Australia at the Melbourne Cricket Ground on Boxing Day 1995, Australian umpire Darrell Hair called Muralitharan for throwing in front of a crowd of 55,239. The off-spinner was no-balled seven times in three overs by Hair, who believed the then 23-year-old was bending his arm and straightening it in the process of delivery; an illegal action in cricket.

Muralitharan had bowled two overs before lunch from umpire Steve Dunne's or the Members' End of the ground with umpire Hair at square leg and these passed without incident. At 2:34 pm he took up the attack from umpire Hair's or the southern end. Muralitharan's third over was a maiden with all deliveries again passed as legitimate but in his fourth Hair no-balled him twice for throwing on the fourth and sixth balls. The umpire continued to call him three times in his fifth over on the second, fourth and sixth balls. While the bowler stood with his hands on his hips perplexed, the five calls provoked an immediate response by the Sri Lankan captain Arjuna Ranatunga who left the field at 3:03 pm to take advice from his team management. He returned at 3:08 pm and continued with Muralitharan who was called two more times in his sixth over on the second and sixth balls. At 3:17 pm Ranatunga removed the bowler from the attack, although he reintroduced him at 3:30 pm at umpire Dunne's end. Although Hair reports in his book, "Decision Maker", that at the end of the tea break he stated that he would call Muralitharan no matter which end he bowled he did not do so. Muralitharan completed another twelve overs without further no-balls and, after bowling Mark Waugh, finished the day with figures of 18–3–58–1.

After being no-balled Muralitharan bowled a further 32 overs from umpire Steve Dunne's end without protest from either Dunne or Hair, at square leg. The Sri Lankan camp was outraged after the incident, but the ICC defended Hair, outlining a list of steps they had taken in the past to determine, without result, the legitimacy of Muralitharan's action. By calling Muralitharan from the bowlers' end Hair overrode what is normally regarded as the authority of the square leg umpire in adjudicating on throwing. Dunne would have had to break convention to support his partner.

At the end of the match the Sri Lankans requested from the ICC permission to confer with Hair to find out exactly how to remedy the problem with their bowler. Despite the game's controlling body agreeing to it, the Australian Cricket Board vetoed it on the grounds that it might lead to umpires being quizzed by teams after every game and meant that the throwing controversy would continue into the World Series Cup during the coming week. The Sri Lankans were disappointed they did not get an explanation and decided they would continue playing their bowler in matches not umpired by Hair and wanted to know whether other umpires would support or reject Hair's judgement.

Muralitharan's action was cleared by the ICC after biomechanical analysis at the University of Western Australia and at the Hong Kong University of Science & Technology in 1996. They concluded that his action created the 'optical illusion of throwing'.

==== Mid career ====
On 16 March 1997, Muralitharan became the first Sri Lankan to reach 100 test wickets, when he dismissed Stephen Fleming in the second innings of the Hamilton Test.

In January 1998, Muralitharan took his first ten-wicket haul against Zimbabwe in the first test at Kandy. Sri Lanka won by eight wickets and Muralitharan had figures of 12 for 117.

In August that same year Muralitharan produces his career-best test match figures of 16 for 220, in the one-off test against England. In England's second innings Muralitharan bowled a marathon 54.2 overs to pick up 9 for 65 runs, the other wicket being a run out. Ben Hollioake becomes his 200th test wicket. Sri Lanka won by ten wickets, their first Test victory in England. After breaking the world record for the most test wickets in 2007, Muralitharan commented that his 1998 performance at the Oval against England, was his career highlight. He stated "Everyone thought I was a good bowler then and I didn't look back from there."

Playing his 58th test, Muralitharan claimed his 300th test wicket when he dismissed Shaun Pollock in the First Test in Durban, in December 2000. Only Dennis Lillee reached the milestone faster, in his 56th test.

On 4 January 2002 in Kandy Muralitharan might have finished with the best-ever figures for a single innings, but after he had claimed nine wickets against Zimbabwe Russel Arnold dropped a catch at short leg. He missed out on the tenth when Chaminda Vaas dismissed Henry Olonga caught behind amid stifled appeals. Muralitharan follows up his 9 for 51 in the first innings with 4 for 64 in the second, equalling Richard Hadlee's record of 10 ten-wicket match hauls, but needing 15 fewer Tests to do so.

On 15 January 2002 playing in his 72nd test, Muralitharan became the fastest and youngest to reach the 400-wicket landmark when he bowled Olonga in the third Test in Galle.

On 16 March 2004 Muralitharan became the fastest and the youngest bowler to reach 500 wickets during the second test between Sri Lanka and Australia played in Kandy. In his 87th test, he bowled Kasprowicz to claim his 500th victim just four days after Warne reached the landmark on the fifth day of the First Test between the two teams at Galle. Warne took 108 tests to reach 500. Muralitharan took 4–48 on the first day of the second Test as Australia were skittled for 120 in the first innings.

==== Passing Walsh and Warne ====
In May 2004, Muralitharan overtook West Indian Courtney Walsh's record of 519 Test match wickets to become the highest wicket-taker. Zimbabwe's Mluleki Nkala becomes Muralitharan's 520th scalp in Tests. Muralitharan held the record until Shane Warne claimed it in October 2004. Warne surpassed Muralitharan's mark of 532 wickets by dismissing India's Irfan Pathan. Warne said he enjoyed his duel with Muralitharan, who was sidelined following shoulder surgery at the time.

After an outstanding year Muralitharan was adjudged as the Wisden Leading Cricketer in the World in 2006. In six Tests, he took 60 wickets. He took ten in each of four successive matches, the second time he performed such a feat. The opponents for his 60-wicket haul were England away, South Africa at home and New Zealand away: serious opposition. In all, Muralitharan took 90 wickets in 11 Tests in the calendar year. For his performances in 2006, he was named in the World Test XI by ICC and ESPNcricinfo.

In July 2007, Muttiah Muralitharan became the second bowler after Warne to capture 700 Test wickets. The off-spinner reached the landmark when he had Bangladesh's last man Syed Rasel caught in the deep by Farveez Maharoof on the fourth day of the third and final Test at the Asgiriya Stadium in Kandy. The dismissal signalled Sri Lanka's victory by an innings and 193 runs to give the host a 3–0 sweep of the series. Muralitharan finished with six wickets in each innings to claim 10 wickets or more in a Test for the 20th time. However, he was unable to pass Warne's record of 708 wickets when Sri Lanka toured Australia in November 2007, capturing just four wickets in two Test matches.

Muralitharan reclaimed the record for most Test wickets during the first Test against England at Kandy on 3 December 2007. The spinner bowled England's Paul Collingwood to claim his 709th Test victim and overtaking Shane Warne in the process. Muralitharan reached the mark in his 116th Test – 29 fewer than Warne – and had conceded only 21.77 runs per wicket compared to the Australian's 25.41. This was Muralitharan's 61st 5-wicket haul. Warne believed that Muralitharan would take "1,000 wickets" before he retired. Former record holder Courtney Walsh also opined that this would be possible if Muralitharan retained his hunger for wickets. Muralitharan himself believed there was a possibility that he would reach this milestone. For his performances in 2007, he was named in the World Test XI by ICC and ESPNcricinfo.

==== Beyond the world record ====
In July 2008, Muralitharan and Ajantha Mendis stopped India's strong batting as Sri Lanka won the first Test by a record innings and 239 runs in Colombo. Muralitharan finished the match with 11 wickets for 110, as India were shot out for 138 in their second innings after conceding a lead of 377 on the fourth day. He was well supported by debutant Ajantha Mendis, an unorthodox spinner with plenty of variation, who took eight wickets in his debut match.

Muralitharan believed the emergence of Mendis would help prolong his own career. Muralitharan, 36, and 23-year-old Mendis formed a formidable partnership in the first Test thrashing of India, taking 19 of the 20 wickets between them. "If he keeps performing this way, he will definitely take a lot of wickets in international cricket. Now that he has come, I think I can play Test cricket a few more years. Bowling 50 overs in a Test innings is very hard. Now if I bowl only 30–35 and he bowls more than me, the job will get easier for me."

For his performances in 2008, he was named in the World Test XI by ICC.

==== Performance analysis ====
Table: Test bowling performance
A Summary of Muralitharan's Test bowling performance against all opponents.
Versus	M	O	M	R	W	5w	10w	Best	Avg	S/R	E/R
Australia	13*	685.3	100	2128	59	5	1	6 for 59	36.07	69.7	3.1
Bangladesh	11	452.0	114	1190	89	11	4	6 for 18	13.37	30.4	2.6
England	16	1102.1	348	2247	112	8	4	9 for 65	20.06	59.0	2.0
India	22	1125.2	215	3297	105	7	2	8 for 87	32.32	66.1	2.9
New Zealand	14	753.2	203	1776	82	5	1	6 for 87	21.53	55.1	2.3
Pakistan	16	782.5	184	2027	80	5	1	6 for 71	25.46	58.7	2.6
South Africa	15	984.4	221	2311	104	11	4	7 for 84	22.22	56.8	2.3
West Indies	12	622.3	143	1609	82	9	3	8 for 46	19.62	45.5	2.6
Zimbabwe	14	786.5	259	1467	87	6	2	9 for 51	16.86	54.2	1.9
Overall (9)	133	7339.5	1794	18180	800	67	22	9 for 51	22.72	55.0	2.5
Source: ESPNcricinfo *Including one for an ICC World XI

In July 2007, Muralitharan achieved a career peak Test Bowling Rating of 920, based on the LG ICC Player Rankings. This is the highest ever rating achieved by a spin bowler in Test cricket. This also puts him in fourth place in the LG ICC Best-Ever Test bowling ratings.

Muralitharan has the unique distinction of getting 10 or more wickets in a match against all other nine Test playing nations as well as capturing over 50 wickets against each of them. He also obtained 7 or more wickets in an innings against five nations, namely England, India, South Africa, West Indies and Zimbabwe (refer to table above). Muttiah Muralitharan also took at least five five-fors against all the other nine Test teams.

He currently holds the highest wickets/match ratio (6.1) for any bowler with over 200 Test wickets and also represented Sri Lanka in 118 Tests of the 175 that they have played (67.4%).

Against teams excluding Bangladesh and Zimbabwe, Muralitharan took 624 wickets in 108 Tests. By comparison, excluding his matches against Bangladesh and Zimbabwe, Warne took 691 wickets in 142 tests. Murali's average of 24.05 is slightly superior to Warne's career average of 25.41. Muralitharan won 18 Man of the Match awards in Test cricket.

During Muralitharan's playing days, the ICC Future Tours Programme denied Sri Lanka and several other teams a level playing field. As a consequence Muralitharan never toured South Africa after December 2002 and never playing a Test at the spin-friendly Sydney Cricket Ground.

Another comparison of Muralitharan's bowling record against other successful international bowlers is their career record away from home. Muralitharan received criticism that he enjoyed great success on home soil, taking wickets on pitches that are more spin-friendly than other international pitches. A quick analysis of his Test record of matches played outside Sri Lanka shows that from 52 matches he took 278 wickets at an average of 26.24 runs per wicket, with a strike rate of 60.1 balls per wicket. Similarly, spin bowling rival Shane Warne retired with a slightly superior 'away' record of 362 wickets from 73 matches, at an average of 25.50 and a strike rate of 56.7. Due to the variabilities of Test cricket such as grounds played at and opposition played against it is difficult to compare the quality of the top level players and, as such, is very difficult and subjective. However, it is clear that Muralitharan did much better playing at home to test minnows Zimbabwe and Bangladesh, averaging less than 16 runs a wicket.

Cricinfo's statistics editor S Rajesh concluded that the decade 2000–2009 was the best 10-year period for Test batsmen since the 1940s. Muralitharan was clearly the leading Test wicket-taker during this period, capturing 565 wickets at 20.97 in spite of the dominance of the bat over ball. Shane Warne captured 357 wickets at an average of 25.17 during the decade. Of spinners with over Test 100 wickets only John Briggs (17.75), Jim Laker (21.24), Bill O'Reilly (22.59) and Clarrie Grimmett (24.21) have sub 25.00 bowling averages.

Muralitharan was on the winning team on 54 of the 133 test matches he played. In those games he captured a total of 438 wickets (8.1 wickets per match), at an outstanding average of 16.18 per wicket and a strike rate of 42.7. Muralitharan took 795 wickets for his country Sri Lanka in 132 tests. The next most wickets for Sri Lanka in these 132 Tests was Chaminda Vaas' 309 – less than 40% of the spinner's pile. No one else managed 100. Collectively Sri Lankan bowlers tallied 1968 wickets across that span, of which Muralitharan accounted for 40.4%. Among the 24 other Sri Lankans who took more than 10 of those wickets, only Lasith Malinga did so at a better strike rate (52.3) than Muralitharan's 54.9 – and the latter bowled rather more overs, 6657.1 of them to be precise.

==== Test wicket milestones ====
Number	Batsman	Method	Score	Team	Match #	Test #	Notes
1st	Craig McDermott	lbw	9	Australia	1	1195	
50th	Navjot Sidhu	caught Ruwan Kalpage	43	India	13	1247	
74th	Inzamam-ul-Haq	caught and bowled	26	Pakistan	20	1305	Breaks Rumesh Ratnayake's Sri Lankan record
100th	Stephen Fleming	bowled	59	New Zealand	27	1359	
150th	Guy Whittall	caught Mahela Jayawardene	17	Zimbabwe	36	1395	
200th	Dominic Cork	caught Romesh Kaluwitharana	8	England	42	1423	
250th	Naved Ashraf	lbw	27	Pakistan	51	1489	
300th	Shaun Pollock	caught Tillakaratne Dilshan	11	South Africa	58	1526	
350th	Mohammad Sharif	caught and bowled	19	Bangladesh	66	1561	
400th	Henry Olonga	bowled	0	Zimbabwe	72	1585	
450th	Daryl Tuffey	caught Sanath Jayasuriya	1	New Zealand	80	1644	
500th	Michael Kasprowicz	bowled	0	Australia	87	1688	
520th	Mluleki Nkala	caught Mahela Jayawardene	24	Zimbabwe	89	1698	Breaks Courtney Walsh's world record
550th	Khaled Mashud	caught Thilan Samaraweera	2	Bangladesh	94	1764	
600th	Khaled Mashud	caught Lasith Malinga	6	Bangladesh	101	1786	
650th	Makhaya Ntini	caught Farveez Maharoof	13	South Africa	108	1812	
700th	Syed Rasel	caught Farveez Maharoof	4	Bangladesh	113	1839	
709th	Paul Collingwood	bowled	45	England	116	1851	Breaks Shane Warne's world record
750th	Sourav Ganguly	stumped Prasanna Jayawardene	16	India	122	1884	
800th	Pragyan Ojha	caught Mahela Jayawardene	13	India	133	1964	His final delivery in Test cricket

=== One day internationals ===
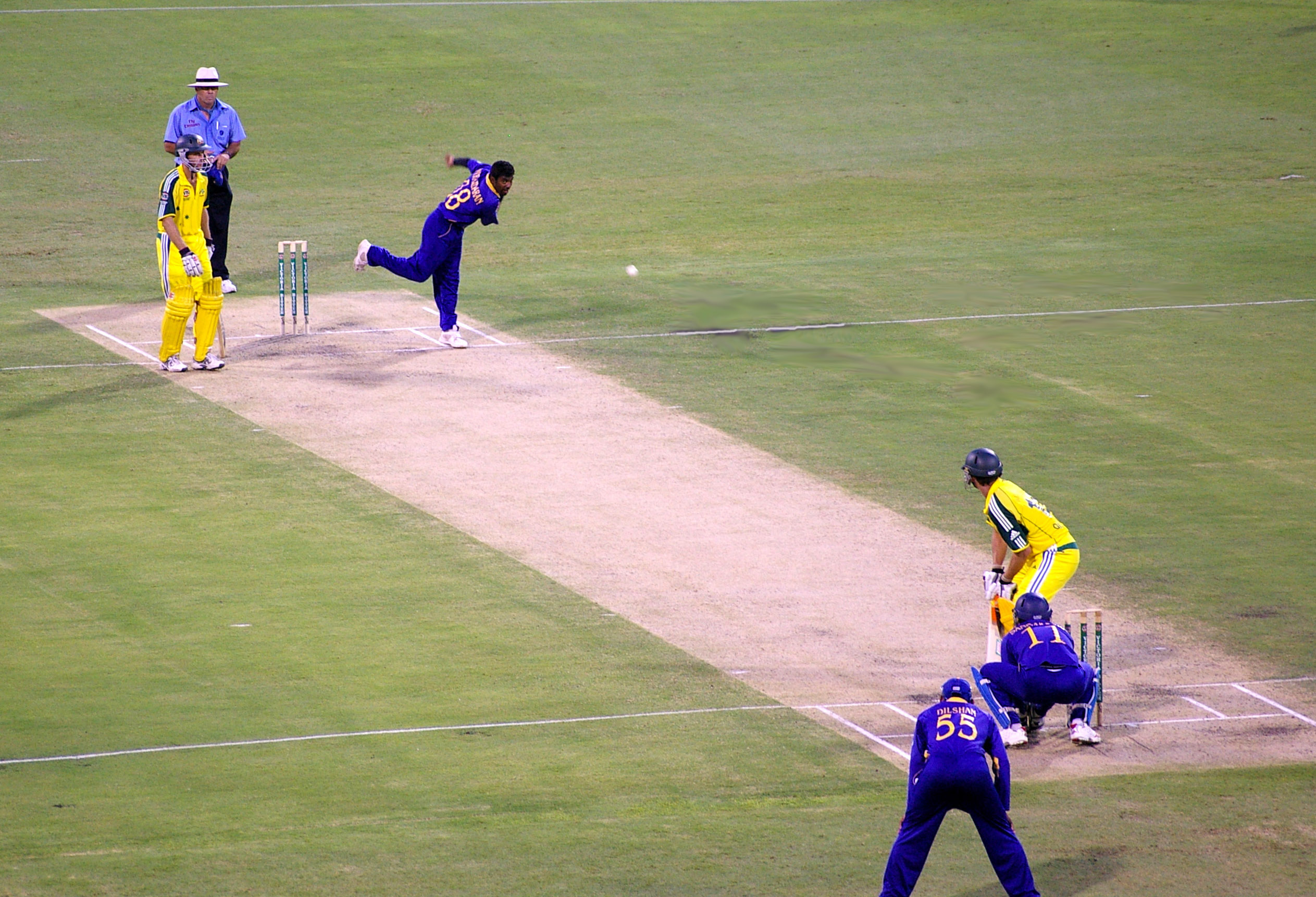
Muralitharan bowling to Adam Gilchrist in an ODI in 2006.

==== Career summary ====
On 12 August 1993 Muralitharan made his One Day International (ODI) debut against India at the Khettarama Stadium and took 1 for 38 off ten overs. Pravin Amre was his first ODI wicket.

On 27 October 2000 in Sharjah, Muralitharan captured 7 for 30 against India, which were then the best bowling figures in One Day Internationals.

On 9 April 2002 Muralitharan achieved a career peak ODI Bowling Rating of 913, based on the LG ICC Player Rankings. This is the highest ever rating achieved by a spin bowler in One Day Internationals. This also puts him in fourth place in the LG ICC Best-Ever ODI bowling ratings.

In 2006, Muralitharan had the second (now third) highest number of runs (99) hit off him in a One Day International Innings. The Australians, especially Adam Gilchrist, attacked Muralitharan's bowling more than usual that day. Yet, for his performances in 2006, he was named in the World ODI XI by the ICC. Muralitharan does not have a great record against the Australians in ODIs and this was proved again as he was ineffective in the finals of the 2007 World Cup; his chief tormentor again being Gilchrist. Yet, for his performances in 2007, he was named in the World ODI XI by the ICC. He was named in the 'Team of the Tournament' by ESPNcricinfo for the 2007 World Cup.

Muralitharan played in five Cricket World Cup tournaments, in 1996, 1999, 2003, 2007 and 2011. He captured 67 World Cup wickets and is second in the list behind Glenn McGrath who has 71, and represented Sri Lanka in three World Cup finals. In 1996 Muralitharan was part of Sri Lanka's World Cup winning team that defeated Australia in Lahore, Pakistan. Muralitharan also played in the 2007 World Cup final, when Australia defeated Sri Lanka in Bridgetown, Barbados. He picked up 23 wickets in the 2007 World Cup, and finished as the second highest wicket taker in the tournament behind Glenn McGrath. He was part of the 2011 team who lost the world cup final against India in Mumbai. It was his farewell match as well. He was named in the 'Team of the Tournament' for the 2011 World Cup by the ICC.

Muttiah Muralitharan was left out of the Sri Lankan one-day squad to tour West Indies in April 2008. The chairman of selectors Ashantha De Mel clarifying the non-selection stated that "We know he (Muralitharan) can still play in the next World Cup if he is properly looked after, so we want to use him sparingly to preserve him for the big games and the World Cup coming up in the Asian sub-continent where Muralitharan will be a threat."

Muralitharan has the highest number of career wickets in One Day Internationals, having overtaken Wasim Akram on 5 February 2009. Akram took 502 wickets in 356 matches. On 3 February 2009, Muralitharan dismissed Yuvraj Singh in his 327th match, the third ODI against India in Colombo to equal Akram's record. He won 13 Man of the Match awards in this form of the game.

=== Batting ===
An aggressive lower order batsman who usually batted at No. 11, Muralitharan was known for his tendency to back away to leg and slog. Sometimes, he could be troublesome for bowlers because of his unorthodox and adventurous ways. Once, in a Test match against England, while playing Alex Tudor, he moved back towards his leg stump trying to hook the ball and ended up lying on the ground sideways after the shot. He was run out in a match against New Zealand when he left his crease to congratulate Kumar Sangakkara, who had just scored a single to reach his century; the New Zealand fielder had not yet returned the ball to the wicketkeeper, so the ball was still in play. His highest Test score of 67 came against India at Kandy in 2001, including three sixes and five fours. He made valuable scores on occasion, including 30 runs against England at the Oval in 1998, including 5 fours, 38 runs (4 fours, 1 six) against England at Galle in 2003, 43 runs (5 fours, 3 sixes) against Australia at Kandy in 2004 36 runs against the West Indies at Colombo in 2005, and his highest-ever ODI score, 33 not out (4 fours and 2 sixes off 16 balls) against Bangladesh in the final of the 2009 Tri-Series in Bangladesh. In the latter match, Muralitharan's effort, which included three fours and a six off one over, played a key role in Sri Lanka winning the match and series after the first eight overs saw them reduced to 6 for 5, the lowest score ever recorded in an ODI at the fall of the fifth wicket. Muralitharan has a strike rate close to 70 in Test cricket and scored over 55% of his Test runs in fours and sixes.

Muralitharan, together with Chaminda Vaas, holds the record for the highest 10th wicket partnership in Tests for Sri Lanka. The pair put on 79 runs for the last wicket at the Asgiriya Stadium against Australia in March 2004. Muralitharan also holds the record for scoring most runs in Test cricket while batting at the number 11 position.

Muralitharan currently holds the record for the most ducks (dismissals for zero) ever in international cricket (Tests, ODI's and Twenty20), with a total of 59 ducks.

=== Abuse in Australia ===
Muralitharan voiced his frustration at routinely being heckled by Australian crowds who accused him of throwing – one common jeer directed at him was "No Ball!". Following the then Australian Prime Minister John Howard's statement that Muralitharan was a "chucker", in 2004, Muralitharan indicated that he would skip future tours to Australia.

Tom Moody, the former Sri Lanka coach and former Australian Test cricketer, said he was embarrassed by the derogatory reaction and negative attention directed towards Muttiah Muralitharan by Australian crowds. Moody stated that "As an Australian when I have been with the Sri Lankan team in Australia, or playing against them in the World Cup, it's the only situation we find in the whole of the cricketing world where we have this disgraceful slant on a cricketer".

During the 2008 Commonwealth Bank series in Australia, some members of the Sri Lankan contingent including Muralitharan, were the target of an egg throwing incident in Hobart. The Sri Lankan cricket selector Don Anurasiri was hit by an egg, while Muralitharan and two others were verbally abused by a car-load of people as they were walking from a restaurant back to the hotel. Due to the incident taking place at night, it is unclear whether Muralitharan was indeed the target of the culprits. Even though the Australian coach of the Sri Lankan team, Trevor Bayliss, down-played the incident as "a non-event", Cricket Australia tightened security around the team. In response to this episode Muralitharan was quoted as saying "When you come to Australia, you expect such incidents".

=== Retirement ===
On 7 July 2010, Muttiah Muralitharan formally announced his retirement from Test cricket at a media briefing in Colombo. He confirmed that the first Test Match against India due to commence on 18 July, 2010 would be his last, but indicated that he was willing to play One-Day Internationals if it was considered necessary leading up to the 2011 World Cup, which Sri Lanka co-hosted. He identified Sri Lanka's World Cup win of 1996 as his greatest moment as a cricketer. He also stated that there were some regrets during his 19-year playing career. "Not winning Test matches in South Africa, Australia and India are regrets. But I am sure we will win very soon."

At the start of his last match, Muralitharan was eight short of 800 wickets. At the fall of the ninth wicket of the Indian's second innings Muralitharan still needed one wicket to reach the milestone. After 90 minutes of resistance Muralitharan was able to dismiss the last Indian batsman Pragyan Ojha on the last delivery of the final over of his Test career. By doing so he became the only bowler to reach 800 wickets in Test cricket. Sri Lanka won the match by 10 wickets, the seventh time they have done so and the second time they have done it against India.

In late 2010, Muralitharan announced his retirement from international cricket after 2011 Cricket World Cup, co-hosted by Bangladesh, India and Sri Lanka announcing "This World Cup will be my last outing. I am retiring totally from international cricket thereafter. My time is up. I've signed up to play for two years in IPL." His final ODI appearance in Sri Lankan soil came during the semi-final clash against New Zealand, where Muralitharan took the wicket of Scott Styris in his last delivery. His last ODI was against India in the World Cup final at Mumbai, however Sri Lanka lost the match and Murali couldn't take any wickets.

== After retirement ==
In July 2014, he played for the Rest of the World team in the Bicentenary Celebration match at Lord's.

== Coaching career ==
Muralitharan has been the bowling coach of Sunrisers Hyderabad since 2015. Under his tenure the Sunrisers emerged as IPL Champions in 2016. He was appointed as team mentor for Thiruvallur Veerans in the 2nd edition of the TNPL.

In 2014, Muralitharan joined the Australian national team as a coaching consultant for the Test series against Pakistan in the United Arab Emirates. On 11 March 2014, he was appointed as the spin bowling consultant for the Cricket Association of Bengal. The tenure started with the players in a four-day camp beginning on 15 March 2014.

He was again called up for the Australian team prior to Australia's tour of Sri Lanka in 2016. Despite his presence in the team as consultant, Australia failed to win any of the three Test matches, losing the series 3–0. Muralitharan's role in the Australian team generated controversy throughout the country and Sri Lanka Cricket, and Muralitharan traded verbal blows with the then Sri Lanka team manager Charith Senanayake following an altercation. The Head of SLC Thilanga Sumathipala warned Muralitharan for attempting to coach the Australian team, the team which gave more pressure to Muralitharan in the past due to his bowling actions. Muralitharan said that the team which was against him in the past but now called him to coach them to play against Sri Lanka was a big victory in his career.

== World records and achievements ==
Muttiah Muralitharan holds a number of world records, and several firsts:

- The most Test wickets (800 wickets)
- The most One-Day International wickets (534 wickets)
- The highest number of international wickets in Tests, ODIs and T20s combined (1347 wickets)
- The most 5-wicket hauls in an innings at Test level (67).
- The most 10-wicket hauls in a match at Test level (22). He is the only player to take 10 wickets/match against every Test playing nation.
- Fastest to 350, 400, 450, 500, 550, 600, 650, 700, 750 and 800 Test wickets, in terms of matches played (indeed the only bowler to exceed 708 wickets).
- Only player to take 10 wickets in a Test in four consecutive matches. He achieved this feat twice.
- Only player to take 50 or more wickets against every Test playing nation.
- Muralitharan and Jim Laker (England), are the only bowlers to have taken 9 wickets in a Test innings twice.
- 7 wickets in an innings against the most countries (5).
- Most Test wickets taken bowled (167), stumped (47) and caught & bowled (35) jointly with Anil Kumble. Bowled by Muralitharan (b Muralitharan) is the most common dismissal in Test cricket (excluding run out).
- Most successful bowler/fielder (non-wicket-keeper) combination – c. Mahela Jayawardene b. Muttiah Muralitharan (77). Most test wickets caught by a fielder(388). Most wickets taken caught(435)
- Most Man of the Series awards in Test cricket (11).
- One of only six bowlers who have dismissed all the eleven batsmen in a Test match. Jim Laker, Srinivasaraghavan Venkataraghavan, Geoff Dymock, Abdul Qadir and Waqar Younis are the others.
- Most Test wickets in a single ground. Muralitharan is the only bowler to capture 100-plus Test wickets at three venues, the Sinhalese Sports Club Ground in Colombo, the Asgiriya Stadium in Kandy and the Galle International Stadium in Galle.
- The only bowler to take 75 or more wickets in a calendar year in test cricket on three occasions, achieving it in 2000, 2001 and 2006.
- Most five wicket hauls in international career (77)
- Most ducks (dismissals for zero) ever in international cricket (across Tests, ODIs, and T20Is): 59 ducks total.
- Most balls bowled in international cricket career (63132)
- 6th in the list of taking the most test wickets in a home test season (62 wicket in 7 matches in 2001/02-Most by a Sri Lankan)
- Most balls bowled by any bowler in test career (44039)
- Holds the record for taking the most test wickets when playing at home soil (493)
- Only bowler to take 100 or more wickets in a calendar year four times (1998, 2000, 2001 and 2006) across all formats (ODI, Test and T20I).
- Highest number of wickets in a calendar year in Tests, ODIs and T20Is combined, with 136 wickets in 2001. (Muralitharan also holds second place for this record, with 128 wickets in 2006).

== Recognition ==
In 2002, Wisden carried out a statistical analysis of all Test matches in an effort to rate the greatest cricketers in history, and Muralitharan was ranked as the best Test bowler of all time. However, two years earlier, Muralitharan was not named as one of the five Wisden Cricketers of the Century. Former Australian captain Steve Waugh called him "the Don Bradman of bowling".

Muralitharan was selected as the Wisden Leading Cricketer in the World in 2000 and in 2006.

On 15 November 2007, the Warne-Muralidaran Trophy was unveiled named after the two leading wicket-takers in Test cricket, Shane Warne and Muralitharan. The trophy displays images of the two spin bowlers' hands each holding a cricket ball. This trophy will be contested between Australia and Sri Lanka in all future Test series.

On 3 December 2007, just hours after Muttiah Muralitharan became Test cricket's leading Test wicket-taker, Marylebone Cricket Club (MCC) announced it had unveiled a portrait of the Sri Lanka off-spinner at Lord's. On the same day the Philatelic Bureau of the Department of Posts in Sri Lanka issued a circular stamp with a denomination of Rs. 5 to mark the world record set by Muttiah Muralitharan. The circular design was meant to denote the cricket ball.

Australian musician Alston Koch provoked worldwide interest when he recorded the only official tribute song to Muralitharan. The song was even mentioned on the BBC's Test Match Special. The Muralitharan Song video was also released after he broke the world record.

On 10 January 2008, the Parliament of Sri Lanka felicitated Muttiah Muralitharan for his world record breaking feat of being the highest wicket taker in Test cricket. This was the first time that a sportsman had been honoured in the country's Supreme Legislature.

The Central Provincial Council in Kandy has renamed the International Cricket Stadium in Pallekele after Muttiah Muralitharan.

== Controversy of bowling action ==
Throughout much of his international career, Muralitharan's action was suspected of contravening the laws of the game by the straightening of his bowling arm during delivery. Although he was cited three times, subsequent biomechanical testing led the ICC to clear him of the charge and permit him to continue bowling.

Biomechanical testing conducted on four occasions fueled debate as to whether his action was in fact illegal or actually an illusion created by his allegedly unique ability to generate extra movement both at the shoulder as well the wrist, which enables him to bowl the doosra without straightening the elbow.

=== First throwing citation and testing ===
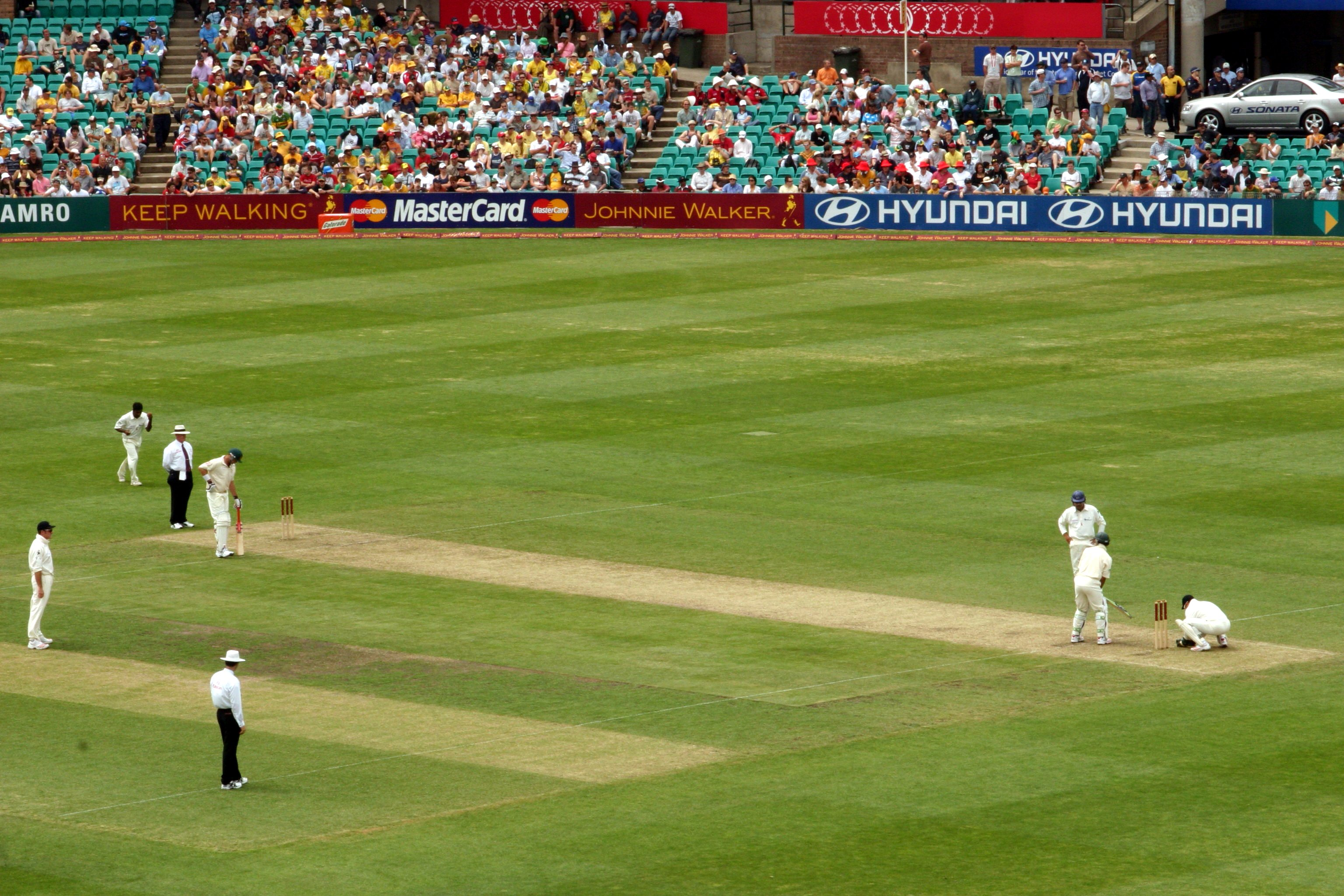
Muttiah Muralitharan bowling in SCG for ICC World XI

Initial concerns as to whether Muralitharan's action contravened the laws of the game by straightening his bowling arm during delivery broke into open controversy after Australian umpire Darrell Hair called a "no-ball" for an illegal action seven times during the Boxing Day Test match in Melbourne, Australia, in 1995. Australian Sir Donald Bradman, universally regarded as the greatest batsman in history, was later quoted as saying it was the "worst example of umpiring that [he had] witnessed, and against everything the game stands for. Clearly Murali does not throw the ball".

Ten days later, on 5 January 1996, Sri Lanka played the West Indies in the seventh ODI of the triangular World Series competition, in Brisbane. Umpire Ross Emerson officiating in his debut international match, no-balled Muralitharan three times in his first over, twice in his second and twice in his third. It was an identical tally to that called by Hair on Boxing Day and (like Hair) Emerson made his calls from the bowler's end while his partner stood silent. The main difference was that several no-balls were for leg-breaks instead of the bowler's normal off-breaks.

In February 1996, just before the World Cup, Muralitharan underwent biomechanical analysis at the Hong Kong University of Science and Technology under the supervision of Prof. Ravindra Goonetilleke, who declared his action legal in the conditions tested, citing a congenital defect in Muralitharan's arm which makes him incapable of fully straightening the arm but gives the appearance of fully straightening it. Although under the original Laws a bowler's arm did not have to be fully straightened to be an illegal delivery, it was concluded that his action created the 'optical illusion of throwing'. Based on this evidence, ICC gave clearance to Muralitharan to continue bowling.

=== Second citation and testing ===
Doubts about Muralitharan's action persisted, however. On the 1998–99 tour to Australia he was once again called for throwing by Ross Emerson during a One Day International against England at the Adelaide Oval in Australia. The Sri Lankan team almost abandoned the match, but after instructions from the President of the Board of Control for Cricket in Sri Lanka, the game resumed. The Sri Lankan captain at the time Arjuna Ranatunga, was later fined and given a suspended ban from the game as a result. It later emerged that at the time of this match Emerson was on sick leave from his non-cricket job due to a stress-related illness and he stood down for the rest of the series. Muralitharan was sent for further tests in Perth and England and was cleared again. At no stage was Muralitharan requested to change or remodel his action, by the ICC. Up to this point in his career (1999) Muralitharan primarily bowled two types of deliveries, namely the off-break and the topspinner. He had not yet mastered the doosra.

=== Third citation and testing ===
Muralitharan continued bowling, taking his 500th Test wicket in the second Test against Australia in Kandy on 16 March 2004. At the end of the series his doosra delivery was officially called into question by match referee Chris Broad. At the University of Western Australia (Department of Human Movement and Exercise Science), three-dimensional kinematic measurements of Muttiah Muralitharan's bowling arm were taken using an optical motion capture system while he bowled his doosra. Muralitharan's mean elbow extension angle for the doosra delivery was 14°, which was subsequently reduced to a mean of 10.2° after remedial training at the university. The findings reported to ICC by the University of Western Australia's study was that Muralitharan's doosra contravened the established ICC elbow extension limit of 5° for spinners.

Under the original throwing Laws of Cricket, the umpires officiating were under an obligation to call "no-ball" to a delivery that they were not entirely happy was absolutely fair. This Law gave the umpires absolutely no discretion. In 2000, the Laws were changed to put an allowable figure of straightening of 5° for spinners, 7.5° for medium pacers and 10° for fast bowlers in an attempt to more clearly define what was legal. But these figures proved difficult to enforce due to umpires being unable to discern actual amounts of straightening and the differentiation between the three different allowable figures. Testing in Test match conditions is not currently possible "when the identification of elbow and shoulder joint centres in on-field data collection, where a shirt is worn, also involves large errors. In a match the ability to differentiate anatomical movements such as 'elbow extension' by digitising segment end-points, particularly if you have segment rotations, is extremely difficult and prone to error. This is certainly the case with spin bowlers. It is therefore not surprising that laboratory testing is preferred, particularly for spin bowlers, where an appropriate pitch length and run-up can be structured. This is clearly the only way to test players, where data would be able to withstand scientific and therefore legal scrutiny."

An extensive ICC study, the results of which were released in November 2004, was conducted to investigate the "chucking issue". A laboratory kinematic analysis of 42 non-Test playing bowlers done by Ferdinands and Kersting (2004) established that the 5° limit for slow and spin bowlers was particularly impractical.

Due to the overwhelming scientific findings, researchers recommended that a flat rate of 15° tolerable elbow extension be used to define a preliminary demarcation point between bowling and throwing. A panel of former Test players consisting of Aravinda de Silva, Angus Fraser, Michael Holding, Tony Lewis, Tim May and the ICC's Dave Richardson, with the assistance of several biomechanical experts, stated that 99% of all bowlers in the history of cricket straighten their arms when bowling. Only one player tested (part-time bowler Ramnaresh Sarwan) reportedly did not transgress the pre 2000 rules. Many of these reports have controversially not been published and as such, the 99% figure stated has yet to be proved. In fact, Muralitharan stirred up controversy when he said during an interview with a Melbourne radio station that Jason Gillespie, Glenn McGrath and Brett Lee flexed their arms by 12, 13 and 14–15 degrees respectively, although it is unclear as to where Muralitharan quoted these figures from. Muralitharan was censured by the Sri Lankan Cricket Board for these comments.

The ICC Executive was asked to ratify the panel's recommendations at the ICC's Annual General Meeting in February 2005. Based on the recommendations the ICC issued a new guideline (which was effective from 1 March 2005) allowing for extensions or hyperextensions of up to 15 degrees for all types of bowlers, thus deeming Muralitharan's doosra to be legal.

Explaining why the maximum level of 15 degrees was arrived at, panel member Angus Fraser stated "That is the number which biomechanics says that it (straightening) becomes visible. It is difficult for the naked eye to see less than 15 degrees in a bowler's action. We found when the biceps reached the shoulder the amount of bend was around 165 degrees. Very few bowlers can get to 180 degrees because the joint doesn't allow that. ... but once you go further than 15 degrees you get into an area which is starting to give you an unfair advantage and you are breaking the law".

=== University of South Australia study ===
The original decision of disallowing the doosra bowling action was hailed widely as justifiable on account of being scientifically based. Hence, a team of Australian scientists representing the University of South Australia conducted an independent research, in line with modern Artificial Intelligence and biomechanics to solve the controversial issue arise from doosra. The University of South Australia's study, founded by Prof. Mahinda Pathegama, and contributed by Prof. Ozdemir Gol, Prof. J. Mazumdar, Prof. Tony Worsley and Prof. Lakmi Jain has analyzed the previous studies with close scrutiny since the techniques in their fields of expertise are employed in the course of assessment as the basis for decision-making. The findings based on this scientific study are overwhelming and Dave Richardson, general manager ICC stated that "the ICC is currently reviewing the Law on throwing and the ICC regulations and the study done by Prof. Mahinda Pathegama with UniSA scientists is a valuable source of information in this regard." The team of Australian scientists including Sri Lankan-born Australian scientist, Prof. Mahinda Pathegama reporting their findings, in line with the Muralitharan test to ICC, has analyzed in-depth various issues, such as Pitfalls in image interpretation when using 2D images for 3D modeling associates compared to the modern techniques in Artificial Intelligence and biomechanics, and Biomechanics assessment for doosra bowling action, etc. Pathegama at al. (2004) further reports on the Disagreement of expression on measurement accuracy in the Murali Report, with the analysis of the Motion tracking system used for the Murali Report, and discussing Cognitive aspects, Evidence of errors in Anthropometric assessment and movement tracking, Lateral inhibition in response tracking, Psycho-physiological aspect on post-assessments, Angular measurement errors, Skin marker induced errors, Geometrics-and physics-based 3D modeling and the Approach to on-field assessment, etc.

The Muralitharan Report produced by the University of Western Australia's study has considered the Richards study done in 1999 to evaluate the error margin. University of South Australia's study done by Prof. Mahinda Pathegama argued that the Richards study which was presented by the University of Western Australia's study has used a rigid aluminium bar that only rotated in the horizontal plane to introduce such error margin. Pathegama's report stated that "in view of the system used in the test itself yielding considerable error even with a rigid aluminum bar (an accuracy level of approximately 4 degrees as stated in the Murali Report), it stands to reason that the error margin would be considerably larger when tracking skin markers on a spin bowler's moving upper limb by this same system". Sri Lankan born Australian medical doctor Siri Kannangara who also then served as the director of the New South Wales Institute of Sports Medicine, was also present at the forefront in analyzing Muttiah Muralitharan's bowling action as part of the University of South Australia case study to determine whether Muralitharan's bowling action was genuinely legitimate or if he was chucking the ball in his bowling runup when delivering the ball in his follow-through at the international level.

Vincent Barnes in an interview argues that Bruce Elliott, the UWA professor who is also the ICC biomechanist, had made an interesting discovery in his dealings with finger spinners. "He said he had found that a lot of bowlers from the subcontinent could bowl the doosra legally, but not Caucasian bowlers."

=== Fourth round of testing ===
On 2 February 2006, Muralitharan underwent a fourth round of biomechanical testing at the University of Western Australia. There had been criticism that the previous round of tests in July 2004 did not replicate match conditions due to a slower bowling speed in the laboratory tests. The results showed that the average elbow extension while bowling the 'doosra' delivery was 12.2 degrees, at an average of 53.75 mph (86.50 km/h). The average for his off-break was 12.9 degrees at 59.03 mph (95.00 km/h).

=== Bowling with an arm brace ===
In July 2004 Muralitharan was filmed in England, bowling with an arm brace on. The film was shown on Britain's Channel 4 during the Test against England on 22 July 2004.

Initially, Muralitharan bowled three balls – the off-spinner, the top-spinner and the doosra – as he would in a match. Then he bowled the same three balls with a brace that is made from steel bars, which are set into strong resin. This brace has been moulded to his right arm, is approximately 46 centimetres long and weighs just under 1 kilogram.

TV presenter Mark Nicholas who tried the brace himself, confirmed that "There is no way an arm can be bent, or flexed, when it is in this brace." All three balls reacted in the same way as when bowled without the brace. They were not bowled quite so fast because the weight of the brace restricts the speed of Muralitharan's shoulder rotation, but the spin was still there.

With the brace on, there still appeared to be a jerk in his action. When studying the film at varying speeds, it still appeared as if he straightened his arm, even though the brace makes it impossible to do so. His shoulder rotation and wrist action seem to create the illusion that he straightens his arm.

The off-spinner said the exercise was to convince a sceptical public rather than sway an ICC investigation into bowling actions launched after he was reported by match referee Chris Broad for his doosra delivery in March 2004, the third time action was taken on his bowling. In an interview for August 2004 edition of Wisden Asia Cricket, Muralitharan stated "I think it will prove a point to those who had said that it was physically impossible to bowl a ball that turned the other way. I proved that it was possible to bowl the doosra without bending the arm."

In 2004 at the R Premadasa Stadium in Colombo, Muralitharan voluntarily performed a series of tests with live video cameras. Michael Slater and Ravi Shastri witnessed it all unfold. Muralitharan once again showed he could bowl all his deliveries including the doosra with an arm brace that prevents any straightening of his elbow. Orthopediatrician Dr Mandeep Dillon stated that Muralitharan's unusual ability to generate extra movement both at the shoulder as well the wrist enables him to bowl the doosra without straightening the elbow.

=== Critics and converts ===
Two vocal critics of Muralitharan's action have been former test cricketers, Australian Dean Jones and Bishan Bedi, the former Indian captain. Dean Jones later admitted to being wrong in his assessment of Murali when he witnessed first hand Murali bowling with an arm-brace on.

Michael Holding, the former West Indian fast bowler was also a critic of Muralitharan, but withdrew his criticisms under the light of the tests carried out. Holding had been quoted as being in "110% agreement" with Bedi, who likened Murali's action to a "javelin throw" and more recently, compared to a "shot putter". Following the ICC study, as a member of the panel that conducted the study, Holding stated, "The scientific evidence is overwhelming ... When bowlers who to the naked eye look to have pure actions are thoroughly analysed with the sophisticated technology now in place, they are likely to be shown as straightening their arm by 11 and in some cases 12 degrees. Under a strict interpretation of the Law, these players are breaking the rules. The game needs to deal with this reality and make its judgment as to how it accommodates this fact."

In May 2002, Adam Gilchrist, speaking at a Carlton (Australian) Football Club luncheon, claimed Muralitharan's action does not comply with the laws of cricket. The Melbourne-based Age newspaper quoted Gilchrist as saying."Yeah, I think he does (chuck), and I say that because, if you read the laws of the game, there's no doubt in my mind that he and many others, throughout cricket history have." These comments were made before the doosra controversy, in spite of Muralitharan's action having been cleared by ICC in both 1996 and 1999. For his comment Gilchrist was reprimanded by the Australian Cricket Board (ACB) and found guilty of being in breach of ACB rules concerned with "detrimental public comment".

During the 2006 tour of New Zealand another Muralitharan critic, former New Zealand captain and cricket commentator Martin Crowe, called for Muralitharan's doosra to be monitored more closely, asserting that his action seemed to deteriorate during a match. Earlier that year when delivering the Cowdrey lecture at Lords Martin Crowe had demanded zero tolerance instead of 15 degrees for throwing and specifically branded Muttiah Muralitharan a chucker. In response to Crowe's criticism ICC general manager Dave Richardson stated that the scientific evidence presented by biomechanists Professor Bruce Elliot, Dr Paul Hurrion and Mr Marc Portuswith was overwhelming and clarified that "Some bowlers, even those not suspected of having flawed actions, were found likely to be straightening their arms by 11 or 12 degrees. And at the same time, some bowlers that may appear to be throwing may be hyper-extending or bowl with permanently bent elbows. Under a strict interpretation of the law, they were breaking the rules – but if we ruled out every bowler that did that then there would be no bowlers left."

== Scientific research on bowling actions ==
Since 1999 there has been a number of scientific research publications discussing Muralitharan's bowling action as well the need for defining the legality of a bowling action using biomechanical concepts. This research directly contributed towards the official acceptance of Muralitharan's bowling action and convinced the ICC to redefine the bowling laws in cricket.

The key publications are listed below:

- Elliot, B.C., Alderson, J., Reid, S. and Foster, D. (2004). Bowling Report of Muttiah Muralitharan.
- Ferdinands, R.E.D. (2004). Three-dimensional biomechanical analysis of bowling in cricket. PhD Thesis, University of Waikato.
- Ferdinands, R.E.D. and Kersting, U.G. (2004). Elbow Angle Extension and implication for the legality of the bowling action in Cricket. In A McIntosh (Ed.), Proceedings of Australasian Biomechanic Conference 5 (9 December – 10), University of New South Wales, Sydney, pp. 26–27.
- Ferdinands, R.E.D. and Kersting, U.G. (2007). An evaluation of biomechanical measures of bowling action legality in cricket. Sports Biomechanics, Volume 6, Issue 3 September 2007, pages 315–333
- Goonetilleke, R.S. (1999). Legality of bowling actions in cricket. Ergonomics, 42 (10), 1386–1397.
- Lloyd, D. G., Alderson, J. and Elliot, B.C. (2000). An upper limb kinematic for the examination of cricket bowling: A case study of Muttiah Muralitharan. Journal of Sports Sciences, 18, 975–982.
- Marshall, R. and Ferdinands R. (2003). The effect of a flexed elbow on bowling speed in cricket. Sports Biomechanics, 2(1), 65–71.
- Pathegama, M., Göl, Ö, Mazumdar, J., Winefield, T. and Jain, L (2003) 'Use of imprecise biomedical image analysis and anthropometric assessment in biomechanics with particular reference to competitive cricket', UniSA Scientific Study, SEIE, University of South Australia, Australia.
- Pathegama, M. and Göl, Ö (2004) 'Special Report on the Controversial doosra bowling action based on UniSA scientific study: As per the invitation made by David Richardson, general manager, ICC), EIE, University of South Australia, Australia.
- Portus, M., Mason, B., Rath, D. and Rosemond, C. (2003). Fast bowling arm actions and the illegal delivery law in men's high performance cricket matches. Science and Medicine in Cricket. R. Stretch, T. Noakes and C. Vauhan (Eds.), Com Press, Ports Elizabeth, South Africa, pp. 41–54.

== Philanthropy ==
Muralitharan, along with his manager Kushil Gunasekara, established the charitable organisation Foundation of Goodness in the early 2000s. The organisation is committed to the wellbeing of the Seenigama region (in southern Sri Lanka) and supports local communities through a range of projects across areas including children's needs, education and training, health care and psycho-social support, housing, livelihoods, sport and the environment. Murali's Seenigama project raised funds from cricketers and administrators in England and Australia. Canadian pop-star Bryan Adams donated a swimming pool.

Muralitharan also planned to build a second sports complex for war-displaced civilians in Mankulam, a town located 300 kilometres from north of Colombo. The two-year, $1 million project aimed to build a sports centre, a school, English and IT training centres and an Elders' home. While the Sports Complex remains the main project, Foundation of Goodness also plans to help educate children, youth and adults. English cricketer Sir Ian Botham visited Mankulam with Muralitharan, and later addressing the media in Colombo on 27 March 2011 said that he will consider a walk from Point Pedro (the extreme northern tip of Sri Lanka) to Dondra Head (the extreme southern tip of Sri Lanka) to raise funds for the project.

In June 2004, Muralitharan also joined the United Nations World Food Programme as an ambassador to fight hunger among school children.

When the 2004 Indian Ocean earthquake devastated Sri Lanka on 26 December 2004, Muralitharan contributed to the relief programs. He himself narrowly escaped death, arriving 20 minutes late at Seenigama, where he was to give away prizes at one of the charity projects he worked on. While international agencies were bringing food in by air, Muralitharan paid for and organised three convoys of ten trucks each to get assist in the distribution. He persuaded those who could to donate clothes, and supervised the delivery himself.

During the rehabilitation efforts in the tsunami's aftermath, cement was in short supply. Muralitharan promptly signed an endorsement deal with Lafarge, a global cement giant, that was a straight barter, where cement would be supplied to the Foundation for Goodness in exchange for work Muralitharan did. During the first three years since the tsunami, the foundation raised more than US$ 4 million to help survivors, and has built homes, schools, sports facilities and computer centres.

== Other work ==
On 1 August 2015, Muralitharan and fellow Sri Lankan cricketer Tillakaratne Dilshan were appointed by President of Sri Lanka Maithripala Sirisena as the Brand Ambassadors for the Presidential Task Force to combat kidney disease.

== In popular culture ==
In July 2019, it was announced that a biopic would be made in Tamil titled 800 with actor Vijay Sethupathi portraying Muralitharan. The film was set to be produced by actor Rana Daggubati under his banner Suresh Productions with MS Sripathy director. However the filming was put on hold due to various reasons such as political opposition. On 8 October 2020, the filmmakers announced that the biopic film tentatively titled as 800 would be proceeded as planned and also revealed that first look poster of the film would be released sooner along with the details of cast and crew members.

Sethupathi received widespread criticism and backlash in the social media for portraying the role of Muttiah Muralitharan in the biopic flick. Netizens also claimed that Muralitharan himself is a pro Rajapaksa supporter and requested Sethupathi to leave the filming. In addition, politicians from Tamil Nadu also cautioned that a Tamil actor shouldn't play the role of a Sri Lankan recalling the claims of genocide massacre of over 200,000 Sri Lankan Tamils during the final stage of the Sri Lankan Civil War. Dravidian outfit in Coimbaitore also urged Vijay Sethupathi to drop out from the project insisting that Muralitharan supported Sinhalese during the Sri Lankan Civil War. #Shame on Vijay Sethupathi hashtag was trending on the social media on 13 October 2020 soon after the motion poster release of the film which was released via Star Sports prior to the group stage match between Chennai Super Kings and Sunrisers Hyderabad during the 2020 Indian Premier League. Muralitharan denied the allegations regarding supporting the killing of civilians during the civil war and insisted that the war should not be glorified. Due to the political upheavals regarding the film, Muralitharan himself urged Sethupathi to opt out of the project and the film project did not materialise.

On 17 April 2023, coinciding with the birthday of Muralitharan, the first look poster of the biopic titled 800 was released with Madhur Mittal replacing Sethupathi. The film, produced by Movie Train Motion Pictures, was filmed across Sri Lanka, Chennai, Cochin, England, and Australia.

== See also ==
- ICC Cricket Hall of Fame
- List of international cricketers called for throwing
- List of cricketers called for throwing in top-class cricket matches in Australia
- List of World XI ODI cricketers
- List of Asian XI ODI cricketers
- World Cricket Tsunami Appeal

Awards and achievements
Preceded by Steve Waugh	Wisden Leading Cricketer in the World; 2000	Succeeded by Glenn McGrath
Preceded by Andrew Flintoff	Wisden Leading Cricketer in the World; 2006	Succeeded by Jacques Kallis
Records
Preceded by Shane Warne	World Record – Most Career Wickets in Test cricket 800 wickets (22.72) in 133 Tests	Incumbent
Preceded by Wasim Akram	World Record – Most Career Wickets in ODI cricket 534 wickets (23.08) in 350 matches	Incumbent
