= Harold Cotton (cricketer) =

Australian cricketer

Personal information
- Full name: Harold Norman Jack Cotton
- Born: 3 December 1914; Prospect, South Australia, Australia
- Died: 6 April 1966 (aged 51); Malvern, South Australia, Australia
- Batting: Right-handed
- Bowling: Right-arm fast
- Role: Bowler

Domestic team information
- Years: Team
- 1935/36–1940/41: South Australia
- First-class debut: 29 February 1936 v Tasmania
- Last First-class: 21 February 1941 v New South Wales

Career statistics
Competition	First-class
Matches	25
Runs scored	165
Batting average	11.78
100s/50s	0/0
Top score	37*
Balls bowled	4695
Wickets	76
Bowling average	27.28
5 wickets in innings	1
10 wickets in match	0
Best bowling	5/49
Catches/stumpings	21/0
- Source: CricketArchive, 17 November 2011

Harold Norman Jack Cotton (3 December 1914 – 6 April 1966) was an Australian cricketer who represented South Australia in first-class cricket from the late 1930s to the early 1940s, taking 76 wickets in 25 matches as a fast bowler. He is primarily known for twice being no-balled by Andrew Barlow for throwing.

Cotton was a genuinely fast bowler. He made his first-class debut against Tasmania at the Adelaide Oval in March 1936 in the match where Don Bradman set the Adelaide Oval first-class record of 369. He played his first two matches under the Test umpires Jack Scott and Arthur Richardson, who did not penalise his bowling action. The following season, 1936–37, when he was playing against Victoria at the Melbourne Cricket Ground in the Sheffield Shield, Cotton was once no-balled for throwing by Barlow, who was standing at square leg. It was Cotton's third match at first-class level.

Cotton took his best innings haul of 5/49 in a match against Queensland at the Gabba in November 1939. He had made more than half of his appearances at his first class career and was passed many times by Scott and fellow Test umpire George Borwick before he again crossed paths with Barlow at the MCG in December 1940 in another match against Victoria. Barlow called him again. Cotton's last first-class match was against New South Wales in February 1941.

Cotton was never no-balled for throwing in district cricket in Adelaide, so the two no-balls called by Barlow were the only two made against him for throwing. Cotton's no-balling spanned four years, the longest span of any bowler in senior cricket in Australia.

During the Second World War Cotton served in the Australian Army from January 1942 to November 1945. A knee injury forced Cotton's retirement from cricket in December 1945.

== See also ==
- List of cricketers called for throwing in top-class cricket matches in Australia
- List of South Australian representative cricketers
