= W. A. Young =

Australian cricket umpire

William Alexander Young was an Australian Test cricket umpire. He umpired one Test in 1912.

Young umpired 15 first-class matches between 1901 and 1913, all of them in Melbourne. He umpired the Test match between Australia and England at the Melbourne Cricket Ground on 9 February to 13 February 1912, won easily by England after a record first-wicket partnership of 323 between Jack Hobbs and Wilfred Rhodes. Young gave Rhodes out caught by the wicket-keeper. Young's colleague was Bob Crockett.

== See also ==
- List of Test umpires
