= Ted Wykes =

Australian cricket umpire (1921–2008)

Edgar Frederick Wykes, OAM, (born 28 April 1921 in Little Brington, Northamptonshire, England) was an Australian cricket Test match umpire. His family emigrated from the UK to Australia in 1925 as assisted immigrants.

He was a cricket player until WWII when he enlisted and was sent to Meckering Western Australia, an embarkation point for troops leaving for overseas action. While cleaning a machine gun, he was ordered by a lieutenant to clean it in a way which Wykes knew to be wrong, but he had to obey orders. The gun exploded and Wykes was shot in the ankle and foot, shattering many bones in his foot. An operation removed several of his toes on the left foot and he thereafter had to wear an elevator shoe on it. This injury put paid to his cricket playing career and he then took up umpiring.

He umpired one Test match between Australia and England at Brisbane on 30 November to 5 December 1962, a match drawn with England requiring 100 runs to win with 4 wickets in hand. Brian Booth scored a century and there were 13 other scores of at least 50. Wykes’ partner in this match was Colin Egar.

Wykes joined the NSW Cricket Umpires’ Association in 1949, became a first-class umpire in 1956, and retired from first-class umpiring in 1972, after 85 appearances.

He retained his involvement in umpiring, as President of the NSW Cricket Umpires’ Association from 1967 to 1989, and was still Vice-president in 2000.

He received an Order of Australia medal for his services to cricket in 1980, and became a Life Member of the NSW Cricket Association in 1982.

He died on 22 November 2008 at Wollongong Australia. His ashes were buried with full honours at the Sydney Cricket Ground on 9 February 2009 in two locations near the Test Pitch.

The Cricket Umpire's Association Medal, once restricted to umpires officiating in Sydney grade cricket, was renamed as the E F Wykes OAM Association Medal in Wykes' honour.

== See also ==
- Australian Test Cricket Umpires
- List of test umpires
- Recipient of Ted Wykes Medal
