= William Sidebottom (cricketer) =

Australian cricketer

Personal information
- Full name: William Lemuel Sidebottom
- Born: 24 September 1862; Evandale, Tasmania, Australia
- Died: 11 April 1948 (aged 85); Launceston, Tasmania, Australia
- Batting: Left-handed
- Bowling: Right-arm leg-spin

Domestic team information
- Years: Team
- 1883-84 to 1894-95: Tasmania

Career statistics
Competition	First-class
Matches	8
Runs scored	149
Batting average	12.41
100s/50s	0/1
Top score	59
Balls bowled	317
Wickets	5
Bowling average	34.60
5 wickets in innings	0
10 wickets in match	0
Best bowling	1/15
Catches/stumpings	2/–
- Source: Cricinfo, 14 September 2021

William Lemuel Sidebottom (24 September 1862 – 11 April 1948) was an Australian cricketer. He played eight first-class matches for Tasmania between 1883 and 1895.

Born in Evandale, Tasmania, south of Launceston, Sidebottom attended Launceston Church Grammar School and worked for the Bank of Tasmania in Lefroy before taking charge of his father's wattle bark business, which he ran for the rest of his life. He played cricket for Launceston Cricket Club and represented the North of Tasmania from 1879 to 1896 as well as Tasmania. Later he was a prominent racehorse owner in Tasmania.

He married Olivia Mary Kent in Launceston in November 1884. He died at his home in Launceston, survived by three daughters.

== See also ==
- List of Tasmanian representative cricketers
