= Ross Emerson =

Australian cricketer and umpire (born 1954)

Personal information
- Full name: Ross Emerson
- Born: 26 February 1954 (age 72); Australia

Umpiring information
- ODIs umpired: 10 (1996–1999)
- FC umpired: 50 (1983–1999)
- LA umpired: 37 (1982–2000)
- Source: Cricket Archive, 18 January 2013

Ross Alexander Emerson (born 26 February 1954) is a former Australian cricket umpire who is best known for calling Sri Lankan off-spinner Muttiah Muralitharan for throwing. He also played grade cricket for Petersham-Marrickville in the Sydney grade cricket competition. He is the brother-in-law of former Australian swing bowler Terry Alderman and the husband of Denise Emerson.

After making his first-class umpiring debut in the 1982–83 season, Emerson was promoted to the National Umpires panel in 1993–94. He made his ODI debut in a match between Sri Lanka and the West Indies in Brisbane in January, 1996. He immediately became controversial, no-balling Muralitharan seven times, and continuing to do so even when he switched to bowling legbreaks, which are considered impossible to throw. This led to Muralitharan being dropped by Sri Lanka for the rest of the tour, as he was unable to bowl without being called. Emerson continued to officiate in ODIs for the next three years, standing in nine more games, all in Australia, but it was his last game which overshadowed even the first.

On 23 January 1999 in Adelaide, standing at square leg, Emerson once again called Muralitharan, prompting Sri Lankan captain Arjuna Ranatunga to lead his team off the field in protest and consult team management and the match referee. The match later continued after Emerson threatened to award the match to England, with Muralitharan confined to bowling legbreaks; Emerson claimed that cricket was controlled by Asian countries. Mahela Jayawardene went on to score a century and the Sri Lankans won in the last over with Muralitharan scoring the final runs. Video clearly showed that Emerson was calling Muralitheran's legbreaks as throws as well, proving to many that he was simply out to call any delivery that Muralitheran bowled a no ball, regardless of it involving straightening the arm or not (Emerson had what can best be described as a poor game when the later missed a clear run out of Jayawardene).

Emerson was subsequently stood down, and then was not reappointed to officiate again, claimed he had been asked to no-ball Murali by an Australian official and was ignored once the incident became a major issue. "I was called to a meeting with him (Australian Cricket Board Official) and, knowing that I had called some other players, he told me I had set standards in certain areas which I should uphold in Adelaide" Emerson said. "Yet everything blew up after I called Murali and when I saw him again he wouldn't even look at me". He subsequently retired from cricket, and as of November 2004, is the president of Swimming Western Australia. However, he remained defiant, saying that Muralitharan's action was "worse than ever". However, cricket commentator Peter Roebuck labelled Emerson a "nincompoop" for calling his legbreak a noball. Roebuck however said that the Doosra was an illegal delivery because his elbows did straighten.

== See also ==
- List of One Day International cricket umpires
- Darrell Hair
