= Ian Meckiff =

Australian cricketer (born 1935)

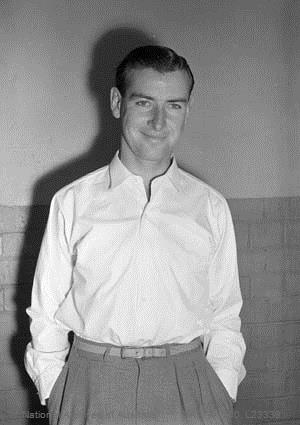
- Meckiff in 1957

Personal information
- Born: 6 January 1935 (age 91); Mentone, Victoria, Australia
- Nickname: The Count, Sputnik, Mecki
- Batting: Right-handed
- Bowling: Left-arm fast
- Role: Bowler

International information
- National side: Australia
- Test debut (cap 208): 23 December 1957 v South Africa
- Last Test: 6 December 1963 v South Africa

Domestic team information
- Years: Team
- 1956/57–1963/64: Victoria

Career statistics
Competition	Test	First-class
Matches	18	74
Runs scored	154	778
Batting average	11.84	11.27
100s/50s	0/0	0/1
Top score	45*	55
Balls bowled	3,734	16,376
Wickets	45	269
Bowling average	31.62	23.35
5 wickets in innings	2	12
10 wickets in match	0	1
Best bowling	6/38	6/29
Catches/stumpings	9/–	37/–
- Source: CricketArchive, 24 January 2008

Ian Meckiff (born 6 January 1935) is an Australian former cricketer who represented Australia in 18 Test matches between 1957 and 1963. A left-arm fast bowler, he is best known for two matters that were unrelated to his skill as a player: he was the batsman run out by Joe Solomon in 1960, causing the first Tied Test in cricket history; and in December 1963, his career was sensationally ended when he was called for throwing in the First Test against South Africa by Australian umpire Col Egar. During the late 1950s and early 1960s, there had been a media frenzy about the perceived prevalence of illegal bowling actions in world cricket. The controversy and speculation that dogged Meckiff in the years preceding his final match caused sections of the cricket community to believe that he had been made a scapegoat by the Australian cricket authorities to prove their intent to stamp out throwing.

With an unconventional front-on bowling action, Meckiff progressed through the district cricket ranks at South Melbourne Cricket Club, making his first-class debut for Victoria in 1956–57. After a productive first season, Meckiff was named in a new-look Australian team for the 1957–58 tour of South Africa. This was the result of a generational change in the Australian Test team after a decline in performances in the 1950s. The shift saw Meckiff open the bowling in his debut Test, where he performed strongly to take eight wickets. Generating his pace from an unusual bent-arm action which involved a flick of the wrist, Meckiff reached his peak in the Second Test of the 1958–59 season against England at the Melbourne Cricket Ground. He took 6/38 in the second innings as England were dismissed for 87, setting up an Australian victory. His achievement was engulfed by controversy, as English media and former players accused him of throwing Australia to victory.

The controversy over Meckiff's action persisted as throwing was in the spotlight in England, where it was regarded as a growing problem. The issue prompted numerous international discussions and meetings on amending the throwing law and the interpretation thereof. An expected confrontation with English umpires in 1961 was averted when the bowler suffered multiple injuries in the preceding Australian summer and was omitted from the team to tour England, but Meckiff had two strong seasons in domestic cricket that forced the Australian selectors to recall him for the Tests against South Africa in 1963–64. The Victorian's recall had occurred despite his being no-balled for throwing in two separate Sheffield Shield matches in the previous season. In his first over of the Test, Meckiff was no-balled four times by umpire Egar. Australian captain Richie Benaud chose to not bowl his paceman again, and Meckiff retired from all cricket at the end of the match. The throwing controversy provoked heavy debate among cricket commentators, players and umpires, past and present; some praised Egar's no-ball call while others condemned the umpire and felt that the paceman had bowled in the same way as he had always done. Others felt that Meckiff had been set up so that he would be no-balled in an "execution" or "sacrifice" to prove Australia's resolve against throwing.

== Early life ==
Ian Meckiff was born 6 January 1935, in Mentone, Victoria. He is the second of three children born to Vera and Walter Meckiff; he had an older brother Don and a younger sister Margaret. Growing up in Mentone, the children went to Mentone Primary School before progressing to Mordialloc-Chelsea High School, where both brothers became prefects. All of the children represented their high school for sport—Don and Ian in athletics, swimming, football and cricket; and Margaret in softball. The brothers played for Mentone Cricket Club in the Federal District Cricket Association, Ian as a left-arm unorthodox spinner. He routinely dominated the opposition batsmen in the competition, taking 200 wickets at a bowling average of only 4.50 during his career with Mentone. He began playing in Mentone's under-16 team at the age of 11.

== Early career ==
Having failed as a spin bowler in a trial at Richmond in 1950, Meckiff switched to fast bowling in 1951–52 when he began his district career in Victorian Premier Cricket with South Melbourne. He started in the Fourth XI after his brother had to withdraw from a match. The following summer, aged 17, Meckiff was in the senior team and played in South Melbourne's first championship-winning side in his debut season in the First XI, although his club career was sometimes interrupted by national service in the reserves. After receiving requests from cricket administrators, the military authorities scheduled the leave of young players for weekends, so that the impact on their careers would be minimised. At the time, Australia lacked bowlers of great pace, so a teammate advised Meckiff to bowl as fast as he could, without regard for accuracy—a plan he successfully adopted.

Meckiff made his first-class debut for Victoria in 1956–1957 against Western Australia. Coming in to bat with his state's score at 8 wickets for 77 (8/77), he made 19 not out to help them reach 131, before taking three wickets for 45 runs (3/45) to restrict Western Australia to a 34-run first innings lead. His first wicket was future Australian captain Bob Simpson for a duck, and he followed up by removing Test batsmen Barry Shepherd and Ken Meuleman. Meckiff made 11 in the second innings and took 0/40 as Victoria lost by four wickets.

Meckiff's most prominent showing in his debut season was in the Sheffield Shield match against New South Wales during the Christmas period of 1956. At the time, the two states were by far the strongest in Australia; in the past decade, the teams had 18 of the 20 top-two Shield placings between them, and New South Wales were in the process of winning nine consecutive titles. The arch-rivals were at full strength as no international matches were held during the season.

Coming in at 7/173, Meckiff top-scored with 55—his only first-class 50—as Victoria batted first and made a late recovery to end with 244. Meckiff took 3/65, including the wickets of Test players Bill Watson and Richie Benaud as New South Wales responded with 281. In the Victorian second innings Meckiff managed only 8 as Victoria left their opponents a target of 161 runs for victory. The paceman took 4/56 and claimed the final wicket, removing Test opener Jim Burke caught for 8 as New South Wales mustered 160, causing the match to end in the first tie in Shield history. Burke had returned to bat after being injured earlier in the innings, while New South Wales captain Ian Craig, who had been ill, hauled himself out of bed in an attempt to salvage the match after his team had fallen to 7/70. Meckiff's other victims in the final innings included Test players Alan Davidson and Johnny Martin.

Strong showings for Victoria earned Meckiff selection in Neil Harvey's XI for the one-off match against Ray Lindwall's XI at the start of January 1957. These annual fixtures were used as trials for the leading players vying for national selection. Lindwall's men batted first and made 428; Meckiff was the most successful bowler, taking 6/75 while his fellow-bowlers struggled to make inroads into the opposition batsmen. His first wicket was Test batsman Ken Mackay for 99, and he followed this by removing Bob Simpson, Norm O'Neill and Graeme Hole in the middle-order. Meckiff followed his productive bowling with 47 runs in a tail-wagging performance, adding 71 for the eighth wicket with Wally Grout as Harvey's men responded with 419. The Victorian took 0/18 in the second innings as Lindwall's team fell for 188 to leave Harvey's XI with a victory target of 198, which was achieved with seven wickets in hand.

Meckiff had performed strongly in his debut first-class season, ending with 27 wickets at an average of 23.66. He was the ninth-highest wicket-taker for the Australian summer and his average was superior to all eight bowlers who took more wickets. At season's end, he was rewarded with selection for Australia's non-Test tour of New Zealand in February and March 1957. The hosts had Test status at the time, but Australia refused to ratify games against their trans-Tasman neighbours as Test matches, citing the weakness of the New Zealand team.

The tour represented a changing of the guard in Australian cricket following the tour of England and the Indian subcontinent in 1956, with the bowling line-up heavily overhauled due to advancing age, injury and loss of form. Australia had lost three Ashes series in a row, and captain Ian Johnson and his deputy Keith Miller retired upon their return home. Johnson was Australia's first-choice spinner while Miller and the 35-year-old Ray Lindwall had formed Australia's new ball pairing for the previous decade. In addition, the fast bowling all rounder Ron Archer suffered a long-term knee injury during the 1956 tour, while paceman Pat Crawford played only one first-class match in 1956–57 after his marriage broke down. In the wake of Australia's decline in the past five years, the selectors turned to youth in an attempt to rebuild the side, resting several established Test representatives from the side. Ian Craig was installed as the nation's youngest ever captain at the age of 22, having previously played only six Tests without securing a regular position in the team.

The New Zealand campaign was a chance for the younger players to establish themselves in the national team. Meckiff took 2/46 and 3/25 in his first-class debut for Australia, an innings win over Otago. He played in the first match against New Zealand, but after taking 0/41 in a drawn encounter, he was dropped for the second game. The paceman forced his way back into the team for the third match after claiming 4/12 and 5/48 to help to set up an innings victory over Auckland.

In the final match, New Zealand batted first and Meckiff played a leading role in Australia's victory, taking 4/28 from 27.2 overs to help dismiss the hosts for 198. The fast bowler was not required to bat as the tourists replied with 8/350 declared. He took 2/17 in the second innings as the home team fell for 161 before Craig's men sealed the series with a 10-wicket win. Meckiff ended the tour with 20 first-class wickets at 10.85, placing him top of the tour bowling averages.

== Test debut ==
The following season, when the team for the 1957–58 South African tour was announced, Lindwall's name was omitted, despite his 212 Test wickets, second only to Clarrie Grimmett among Australian bowlers. Meckiff was selected for the tour as part of Australia's generational change, after a single season in first-class cricket, and the squad departed for South Africa in October. On the tour, in five first-class matches ahead of the Tests he took 12 wickets, at 26.25.

Meckiff was one of four Australians to make their debuts in the First Test, which was played on a batsman-friendly surface in Johannesburg over the Christmas holiday period. Under some pressure due to Australia's decision to discard Lindwall and invest in new talent, he opened the bowling alongside Alan Davidson, who up to that point had taken only 16 wickets at 34.06 in 12 Tests. The match began badly for Australia's inexperienced attack as the South African openers Jackie McGlew and Trevor Goddard put on an opening stand of 176. Meckiff claimed his maiden Test wicket, and Australia's first breakthrough, when he bowled Goddard for 90. He then removed McGlew for 108 and later dismissed Russell Endean and Roy McLean for 50 apiece. South Africa amassed 470, and Meckiff had the best figures, taking 5/125 in the hosts' first innings, all five being specialist batsmen. When the tourists batted, Meckiff came in at 8/313 and held up his end as centurion Richie Benaud did the majority of the scoring in their 42-run partnership. The debutant ended with 11 in his first Test outing with the bat as Craig's team ended on 368. Meckiff took 3/52 in the South African second innings, including McGlew for the second time, as the match ended in a draw. This fine start to the Victorian's international career was halted in the Second Test at Cape Town, where he broke down with injury early in the first innings and took no further part in an Australian innings victory. He did not take a wicket.

Meckiff missed the Third Test in Durban and spent a month on the sidelines, before returning against a combined team from Orange Free State and Border at the end of January. He took 6/29 in the first innings, his best return of the tour, and earned a recall for the final two Tests of the five-match series. He was not as effective as he was on debut, taking two and one wickets for the matches respectively, and scoring 26 runs in his only innings of the Fourth Test. Overall, the Victorian paceman had made a steady start to his international career, with 11 Test wickets at an average of 32.09, and 56 runs at 18.66. In the entire tour, he took 33 first-class wickets at 23.09. However, there was a hint of the controversy that was to end his career six years later. A year after the series, the South African Test umpire Bill Marais said he was prepared to no-ball Meckiff and his teammate Jim Burke for throwing. There were reports that Craig had been tipped off about Marais's intentions and therefore operated the two bowlers exclusively from the end at which Marais was not officiating.

== Career peak and start of throwing controversy ==
The Victorian paceman's international career peaked in 1958–59 during the English tour of Australia. He started the season with a match for Victoria against the tourists, taking 4/69 and 1/16 in a losing effort. His wickets included English Test batsmen Peter Richardson (twice), Arthur Milton and Raman Subba Row.

The Test team was now under the leadership of Benaud—Craig had been forced to withdraw from cricket due to hepatitis; Meckiff retained his place in the side. Prior to the Tests, English all-rounder Trevor Bailey privately described Meckiff as "the worst bowler ever to represent Australia", and felt he posed little threat to the visitors. However this proved to be questionable. The Benaud era started well for Australia and Meckiff, with a comfortable eight-wicket victory in the First Test in Brisbane. The paceman took 3/33 and 2/30, removing Milton, Colin Cowdrey and captain Peter May early on the first day to help Australia take the initiative after the tourists had batted first. The match also marked the start of behind-the-scenes rumblings about the bowler's action.

Meckiff's career peaked at the Second Test, which began on New Year's Eve, 1958 at the Melbourne Cricket Ground. It was his first international fixture in front of his home crowd, and also marked the start of his career-long public problem with accusations of throwing. The match was dominated by the Victorian and his left-arm pace partner Davidson; the pair took 18 of the 20 English wickets to fall. England's first innings was headlined by Davidson's 6/64; Meckiff took 3/69, including the wicket of England captain May for 113 with a swinging ball, which breached the batsman's defence and crashed into the stumps. This ended a century partnership with Cowdrey, and triggered a collapse that saw England be dismissed for 259, the last six English wickets falling for 49 runs. Meckiff rated the ball as the best of his career. He made a duck as the hosts replied with 308 to take a 49-run lead. It was in England's second innings that Australia's left-arm pacemen were at their most potent; apart from one over from Benaud the pair bowled unchanged to dismiss England for 87 in the 32nd over, Meckiff taking 6/38. Backed a by a vocal home crowd, the Victorian dismissed opener Richardson for three, before removing Bailey, Tom Graveney and Cowdrey in quick succession. He followed this by removing the English skipper for a second time to leave England at 7/71. This set up a comfortable Australian victory as they reached their target of 39 with the loss of two wickets. The Australian pace duo were aided by a series of difficult, diving catches. The pair combined forces when Davidson caught May, and then Graveney, in the leg trap behind square from the bowling of his fellow left-armer, who called the reflex catches "absolutely unbelievable". Meckiff described the hometown atmosphere as "electrifying", and attributed his performance to the crowd support.

The match ended on the eve of Meckiff's 24th birthday, but Australian celebrations were marred by English journalists, who levelled accusations of throwing against him and some of his colleagues. The evening edition of the Melbourne Herald carried a column by former English spinner Johnny Wardle, accusing Meckiff of "throwing England out". Wardle's piece was written confrontationally, as a series of sentences starting with "I accuse". This was followed by more anti-Meckiff comments in the English press, including one that dubbed the bowler "the greatest ogre of international cricket since Larwood". The Evening News proclaimed: "Meckiff's throwing was devastating" and The Star said: "at least two of his wickets were obtained by deliveries which looked to be thrown". Former England spinner Ian Peebles asserted that Meckiff and Gordon Rorke threw "the greater number of balls they deliver", while former English paceman Alf Gover claimed that none of the left-armer's deliveries were legal; it was "ridiculous that a player of his action should be the agent of England's destruction". According to Australian writer Jack Pollard, such headlines relegated the Cold War, which usually occupied the front pages, to the interior of the English newspapers.

By contrast to the strident condemnation of Meckiff in the English press, Australian opinion was mixed. The former Test opener and leading commentator Jack Fingleton said: "when he [Meckiff] delivered to Bailey, his fastest ball looked most suspect" and that the left-armer should have been called for throwing. Fingleton claimed to know of five former Australian Test cricketers who felt that Meckiff threw, but only named the 1930s paceman Ernie McCormick. Former Australian player Tommy Andrews claimed: "if they stop throwing in Australia, cricket will die". Former Australian captain Ian Johnson argued that if Meckiff were to be cited for an illegal action for jerking his wrist, then leading English bowlers such as Trueman, Brian Statham and Tony Lock, who played against Australia during the season, should also be sanctioned. As with Meckiff, Lock was under scrutiny at the time and later tried to change his bowling action but the new style coincided with a downturn in results. Johnson also noted that any successful spinner would be called for throwing if the law were enforced strictly because of their flicking of the wrist and fingers during the delivery of the ball, as they could not otherwise extract spin. In 1993, Robert Coleman, the historian of the Victorian Cricket Association, decried the anti-Meckiff campaign as "Fleet Street bleating", and said: "there have been no more hysterical outbursts on the subject [of throwing] than occurred during England's 1958–59 tour". Writing decades after the event, Pollard said "Meckiff, in fact, went to the crease with a beautifully relaxed approach, paused momentarily with his arm absolutely straight, and then let the ball go with a blurred swing of the arm that was impossible to follow from 60 yards away, even with the aid of good binoculars."

Journalists who wrote books about the 1958–59 season made thinly veiled references to the controversy in the names of their work. Fingleton's account on the series was entitled Four Chukkas to Australia, while E. N. Wellings labelled his tome The Ashes Thrown Away, and accused Meckiff, along with Burke, Rorke and Keith Slater of throwing for Australia in the Tests. An Australian television debate program featured an entire session where English journalists Wellings and Crawford White discussed the throwing issue with former Australian Test cricketers Keith Miller and Sid Barnes.

In the Third Test at the Sydney Cricket Ground Meckiff took one wicket—Bailey—in the first innings, before breaking down with an injury in the second. This ruled him out of the Fourth Test, and he missed a month of cricket before returning for the final Test in Melbourne in mid February, where he removed specialist batsmen May and Ted Dexter. On the field it had been a successful series for the Victorian; he had taken 17 wickets at 17.17, as Australia claimed the series 4–0. These efforts placed him top of the Test bowling averages for the series. When Lindwall was recalled for the Fourth Test in place of the injured Meckiff he was reported to have said "I'm the last of the straight-arm bowlers". The veteran paceman played alongside Meckiff in later matches, including the Fifth Test. Meckiff was also prominent in the two Shield matches against New South Wales, when both teams were at full strength. In the first contest he had match figures of 5/129, his victims including Test teammates Burke, O'Neill and Davidson (twice), but his efforts were unable to prevent defeat. In the return fixture, Meckiff took a total of 7/162; five of his victims were Australian Test batsmen. Victoria held the upper hand, and were 45 runs short of victory in the second innings when time ran out.

Within the wider cricket community there was a steady crescendo of comment condemning the prevalence of bowlers with suspect actions. Prior to the alteration of the bowling law by the Imperial Cricket Conference in 1960, the law stated:

For a delivery to be fair, the ball must be bowled, not thrown or jerked; if either umpire be not entirely satisfied of the absolute fairness of a delivery in this respect, he shall call and signal no-ball instantly upon delivery.

=== Reaction by players and officials ===
In contrast to the heated debate in the media, players and administrators refrained from publicly questioning or condemning Meckiff. Neither the England captain May nor manager Freddie Brown raised any concerns about Meckiff's action after the Test. However, it was later revealed that Brown had wanted to lodge an official complaint with the Australian Board of Control, but May had refused, fearing accusations of sour grapes. Years later, Richardson and some of his fellow batsmen accused the Australian fast bowler of throwing them out, while England paceman Fred Trueman said: "Meckiff's action was totally illegal and that he should never have been allowed to play". Richardson's off spinning teammate Jim Laker likened Meckiff's and Burke's arm actions to those of dart-throwers.

Benaud said he was "completely satisfied that [Meckiff's] delivery was fair and legitimate", while the selection panel of Don Bradman, Dudley Seddon and Jack Ryder continued to pick the paceman, implying that they regarded his action as legal. Bill Dowling, the chairman of the Australian Board of Control, denounced the media attention on suspect bowling actions as excessive and "magnified out of all proportion".

Off the field, the throwing controversy was beginning to affect Meckiff adversely. In his 1961 autobiography, prophetically titled Thrown Out, he said the accusations took a deep personal toll on him and his family, and prompted him to shun the public. He became known by the derisive nickname "Chucker" and was credited on the front cover of his autobiography as "Ian 'Chucker' Meckiff". Meckiff reported that from the Melbourne Test onwards, his son was verbally abused by classmates; Meckiff's parents were persistently told their son bowled illegally. He added that doctors believed his anxiety was contributing to stomach ailments. At the time, players were not allowed to talk to the media during the season, and Meckiff was upset because he could not rebut his accusers while they were free to attack him. He denied ever throwing, but admitted he may have been open to suspicion after bowling 15 to 20 overs in a day's play, as his body would begin to fall away in the delivery stride due to fatigue. He had a permanently bent bowling arm; he generated his pace from his wrist action, and asserted that his thin wrists gave the impression that his whole arm was bending.

== Subcontinent tour ==
In 1959–60, the season started with a Test trial between the XIs of Lindwall and Benaud. Meckiff claimed a match total of 4/90 for Lindwall's men and was selected for the Test tour of Pakistan and India. Before the team departed, Meckiff demonstrated his new bowling action, which used a rigid left arm during the run-up, before swinging the arm over during the delivery stride. Over the next two years, sceptics and sporting opponents mostly regarded his action as fair, and said so in public. He was not called for throwing in either India or Pakistan, meaning that he had played in five nations without being sanctioned.

Meckiff was wicketless in Australia's win in the First Test against Pakistan on a matting wicket in Dacca (now in Bangladesh). In the first innings of the Second Test in Lahore, he took three wickets, including that of opposition captain Hanif Mohammad; the match was Australia's last Test win on Pakistani soil for 39 years. Before the Third Test, he helped the tourists beat the President's XI in a low-scoring game in which none of the four innings totalled over 140. Meckiff claimed four wickets in the match, and was batting (he scored two not out) when Australia reached their victory target with three wickets in hand. He missed the drawn Third Test in Karachi.

In the next leg of the tour, Meckiff returned to the Australian side for the First Test against India in Delhi. After claiming 1/52 in the first innings, he compiled his Test best score of 45 not out. He came in to bat with his team's score at 8/402 and helped Lindsay Kline and Rorke push Australia's score to 468, a first innings lead of 333. Meckiff was unable to capture a wicket in the Indian second innings as Benaud's men won by an innings and 117 runs. He bowled with little success in the Second Test in Kanpur, taking 1/52 in a spin-dominated match in which Jasu Patel claimed 14 wickets to bowl India to their first-ever Test win over Australia. Meckiff was unbeaten on 14 when India secured the final wicket. In his first two Tests on Indian soil, Meckiff's only victim had been Chandu Borde, whom he dismissed twice.

Meckiff's most successful Test during the Indian tour was the drawn third match at Brabourne Stadium in Bombay, where he captured 4/79 and 3/67. In the Indian first innings, after removing opener Nari Contractor for 108, Meckiff captured four of the next five wickets as India collapsed from 3/199 to 8/246—they were eventually all out for 289. In the second innings he secured three quick wickets as the hosts slumped from 0/99 to 4/116 before a recovery which prevented their defeat. Meckiff continued to hold the upper hand over Borde, dismissing him in both innings. The Victorian bowler had little success in the final two Tests, taking only three wickets as Australia won the series 2–1. He ended the subcontinental tour with 15 wickets at 35.73, and scored 70 runs at 23.33. He had particular success against Borde, dismissing him five times in as many Tests. Meckiff returned to Australia in time to play his solitary Sheffield Shield match for the 1959–60 season, taking the only ten-wicket match haul of his career. He took 5/41 and 5/84 to set up an easy win over Western Australia. His first innings effort helped dismiss Western Australia for 141, and Victoria replied with 431 to move into a match-winning position. He also helped South Melbourne to another district title, taking 9/51—including a hat-trick—in the last match of the regular season against Fitzroy. This victory allowed South Melbourne to climb from seventh to fourth in the table and become the last qualifier for the semi-finals. They subsequently won their semi-final and the grand final to secure the title.

== Alterations to the throwing law ==
In 1960, at a meeting of the Imperial Cricket Conference in London, cricket's "throwing law" was changed to forbid the straightening of the arm at the instant of the ball's delivery. The Australian Board of Control were so concerned about the controversy and its possible impact on the Australian game that they sent Board chairman Dowling and board member Sir Donald Bradman to the meeting, rather than the customary Britain-based representative. Despite the agreed change in the law, because of conflicting interpretations in different countries a compromise was agreed, which specified an amnesty during the forthcoming 1961 Australian tour to England. It was agreed that on the tour, umpires would privately report any concerns about bowling actions to the teams concerned, for them to remedy. After the tour, umpires would "call" bowlers whenever they felt the new law to have been breached.

On his return to Australia, Dowling angrily accused the English cricket community of pre-judging Meckiff. Dowling said the strident press attacks on Meckiff had amounted to intimidation of umpires through the media, and claimed that some administrators had privately told him that the Australian paceman would be called if he toured England. The president of the Marylebone Cricket Club, Sir Hubert Ashton, said he hoped Australia would not choose Meckiff for their 1961 tour.

== Tied Test against the West Indies, 1960–61 ==
The Victorian was not called during the 1960–61 Australian season, but his performances were ineffective and he was repeatedly hampered by injuries. In particular, a strained achilles tendon restricted his speed and penetration, particularly in the lead-up to the opening Test. Meckiff played in the First and the Third Tests, taking two wickets at 117.00 and scoring 12 runs at 6.00; he was unable to complete either match, sustaining injuries during the second innings of both fixtures. These fitness problems resulted in his omission for the three other Tests. During the summer, Meckiff's bowling was passed by Col Egar, who later ended his career. He noted that the umpire had told him there was little point in changing his action.

Meckiff took match figures of 4/90 as Victoria started the season with a nine-wicket win over South Australia, but he managed only 2/122 as his state lost by an innings to the touring West Indies in the next fixture. The paceman removed Rohan Kanhai, who made 252 of the visitors' 493, and captain Frank Worrell, who contributed 82. During the heavy defeat, Meckiff equal top-scored with 24 not out in the first innings, as the hosts struggled against the mysterious spin of Sonny Ramadhin. Despite his unpenetrative performance with the ball, the paceman was retained for the First Test in Brisbane. The Caribbean team batted first and attacked Meckiff, taking more than seven runs per over from his bowling. The paceman ended with 1/129 from 18 overs as the visitors amassed 453; his only wicket was that of Gary Sobers for 132. The West Indian batsman had been particularly severe on Meckiff and was ironically dismissed by "the day's worst ball"— a leg side full toss that he hit to mid-on. In the second innings, Meckiff broke down after only four overs, but came out to bat on 14 December, late in Australia's climactic run-chase, for which he was often remembered. At the end of a dramatic final day, Australia needed seven runs from the final over for victory, and they had three wickets in hand. The home side had seemed destined for a win after Davidson and Benaud had fought back with a century stand for the seventh wicket in the final session. Both were well set and had passed 50, but the tourists halted Australia's momentum by running out Davidson with a direct hit from the last ball of the previous over. Benaud was caught behind on the second ball of the final over attempting a hook and Meckiff came to the crease to join Wally Grout. Five runs were needed from six balls with two wickets in hand.

The injured paceman blocked the first ball he faced—the third of the over—and ran a bye after missing the next. The West Indian wicket-keeper tried to run Meckiff out, but missed the stumps at the non-striker's end with the batsman many metres out of his ground. Grout top-edged the following ball straight up into the air, but the two fielders who converged beneath it collided and dropped the catch, allowing the Australians to take another run. The hosts thus needed three runs from the last three balls. Meckiff faced the sixth ball; it was a half volley and he lofted it over square leg. The ball looked as though it would reach the boundary for a match-winning four runs; however, after landing close to the fence, it stopped rolling a metre short on the slow outfield. Grout attempted a third run, which would have won the match, but an accurate long throw saw him run out. The last man Lindsay Kline came in for the final two balls, with scores level, and the Australian pair agreed to run under all circumstances. Meckiff backed up significantly in anticipation of a quick single, and set off for the winning run after his partner hit the ball to square leg. However, he was run out by roughly a metre when Joe Solomon directly hit the stumps from side on, causing the first tie in Test history. Umpire Col Hoy said of his decision to give Meckiff out: "God, it was easy. He was miles out." The entire stadium—players and spectators alike—invaded the ground in excitement, but nobody was sure of the exact scores. It was only later that they realised the match was the first Tied Test; Meckiff initially thought Australia had lost and blamed himself for the result.

After missing the Australian victory in the Second Test due to injury, Meckiff returned for the Third Test and he was again attacked, taking 1/74 from 13 overs in the first innings, his sole victim being Conrad Hunte. He then broke down after five overs in the second innings. Davidson also left the field with injury and the tourists took advantage; they attacked the remaining bowlers, levelling the series 1–1. The Victorian did not recover in time for the rest of the Tests.

Persistently hampered by ankle and back injuries, Meckiff aggregated only 19 first-class wickets at 40 for the summer. His best innings performance was 4/39 against Queensland and he was unable to claim more than five wickets in any single match. In one match against arch-rivals New South Wales, the Victorian took a total of 5/155, all of his wickets being Test batsmen. Meckiff was not selected for the Ashes tour. His lack of form saved the Australian selectors the difficult choice of whether to omit him because of his action and avoid a potential run-in with umpires in England. Critics claimed that his new bowling action adopted in 1959–60 had made him legitimate but reduced his pace and effectiveness.

== No-balled in the Sheffield Shield, 1962–63 ==
The throwing controversy subsided during the 1961 English season, and the 1961–62 Australian season was purely domestic, with no touring international teams. As a result, there were no pressing diplomacy imperatives involving throwing. Meckiff was Victoria's leading bowler with 28 wickets at 27.14 in eight matches and was not called. His best performance was 5/53 in the first innings of the match against Queensland at the MCG, which ended in defeat for the home team. Despite healthy results for the season overall, the paceman struggled and took match figures of 2/136 and 3/112 as Victoria lost both their matches against the dominant New South Wales XI, who won their ninth successive Shield. At the end of the season, Meckiff was part of an International XI that toured New Zealand and played against the hosts' national team and against teams from India and Pakistan. He had little success, taking four wickets at 53.00 in three matches.

In 1962–63, Meckiff was again under the spotlight when Ted Dexter's Englishmen toured Australia. He topped the bowling averages for the Australian first-class season with 58 wickets at 19.86 from ten matches, as Victoria won the Sheffield Shield, ending New South Wales' run of titles. Meckiff and Alan Connolly formed an effective pace pairing, helping Victoria to win four of its eight Shield games, and take first innings points in two others.

Meckiff was hoping to regain his Test place, and started his 1962–63 campaign in a Sheffield Shield match against South Australia. After Victoria made 174, the paceman took 4/65 to dismiss South Australia for 141 in the first innings. In the second innings he took 3/76 to help seal a win. He continued his early season form in taking match figures of 7/179 against Western Australia, but was unable to prevent defeat. Despite these performances, Meckiff was overlooked for the First Test. He had another chance to vie for national selection when Victoria played England after the opening Test, and took match figures of 4/90 as the tourists completed a five-wicket victory. He dismissed Ray Illingworth, Geoff Pullar and Alan Smith as Victoria took a four-run first innings lead, but the hosts collapsed in their second innings and Dexter's men reached their target of 180 with five wickets in hand.

Victoria then played the first of their two matches for the season against their arch-rivals New South Wales, just before the Second Test. Meckiff took 3/33, removing Grahame Thomas, Benaud and Martin as Victoria dismissed the reigning champions for 132. He contributed 32 runs at the end of the Victorian first innings reply, helping to extend his team's first-innings lead to 135 runs. In the New South Wales second innings Meckiff took 3/73, removing Test players Simpson, Davidson and Benaud, to leave his team with a target of 95 runs to win, which they reached with eight wickets in hand.

Despite this effort, he was not selected for the Second Test. His season was then marred when he was called for throwing for the first time in any competition. In January 1963, Victoria played South Australia at the Adelaide Oval. After Victoria had made 218, Meckiff removed both openers—Les Favell and Ken Cunningham—for the cost of 19 runs before Jack Kierse no-balled the fourth ball of his fourth over. He continued to bowl; his remaining deliveries were deemed legal by the umpires, and he ended with 5/84 in South Australia's reply of 8/408 declared. The hosts had a target of only 108 in the second innings for victory, but Meckiff removed Favell, Cunningham and Neil Dansie with the new ball to destabilise the run-chase. He ended with 3/25 as the South Australians stumbled to 7/86 and held on for a draw.

Meckiff took a total of 3/50 in a seven-wicket defeat of Western Australia before the return match against New South Wales, in which Victoria were 34 runs short of victory with seven wickets in hand when time ran out, Meckiff's match figures being 6/121. He had a final chance to push for Test selection in the second of his state's two matches against England. The tourists batted first and made 375; Meckiff took 5/93, dismissing Pullar, Peter Parfitt, Fred Titmus, David Allen and top-scorer Tom Graveney, who had made 185. He took 2/47 in the English second innings, removing Barry Knight and Ken Barrington. England set Victoria 287 for victory, and the hosts faced defeat before Meckiff batted late in the order to score 38 and help his side to a draw with one wicket in hand. Despite this continued run of prolific wicket-taking and his success against England, Meckiff was overlooked for the Fifth Test. In his absence, Australia struggled to make inroads into the English batting, and the series ended 1–1.

Victoria's season ended with consecutive matches against Queensland. In the first, Meckiff took a total of 5/88 as his side completed an innings victory at home. In the final match in Brisbane, his slower ball was no-balled in his fifth over of the second innings by umpire Bill Priem. Meckiff bowled 14 further overs without incident and ended the innings with 4/74. Victoria drew the match and sealed their Sheffield Shield victory. Meckiff had been the state's leading wicket-taker and one of the key figures in their triumph, but his bowling action was the main talking point at the end of the match.

== Test no-ball ==
Meckiff's performances as the leading wicket-taker during the 1962–63 season meant that he could not be justifiably denied national selection on grounds of productivity, so the matter of his legitimacy had to be resolved. Meanwhile, the retirement of pace spearhead Davidson left a vacancy in the Australian team ahead of the 1963–64 home Test series against South Africa. In the opening Shield matches of the season in Melbourne, Meckiff took match figures of 5/102 and 6/107 against South and Western Australia respectively. His wickets included Test batsmen Les Favell, Garry Sobers, Keith Slater and Barry Shepherd. In the latter match he took the first five wickets in the innings to reduce Western Australia to 5/54. Despite his contributions, Victoria were unable to secure victories against either of their opponents. However, as a result of these strong personal performances, Meckiff was selected for the First Test in Brisbane.

At the start of the season, the Australian Board of Control had issued a directive calling on the umpires to "get tough" in enforcing the laws of cricket, and asked the state associations to "back the umpires to the fullest extent". In the lead-up to the Test, Meckiff was the centre of media attention, and one report described him as cricket's "bogey man". The South Africans were reportedly stunned by Meckiff's selection, giving the impression that they considered him an illegitimate bowler. Reaction in England was also hostile, ahead of Australia's forthcoming tour in the English summer of 1964. Colin Ingleby-Mackenzie wrote in the News of the World: "there is no room in cricket for throwers. Let us hope that...the Australian selectors realise this...otherwise the throwing war will be waged in earnest".

The Brisbane Test was dubbed "Meckiff's Test" by the Australian media; speculation abounded that the bowler was being chosen so he could be no-balled as a public relations effort to promote Australia's anti-throwing credentials. Keith Miller described the left-armer's selection as having "peppered this once drab-looking series into a curry hot-pot, with all the excitement and trimmings of an Alfred Hitchcock thriller". Miller further predicted that the umpires Egar and Lou Rowan would be having sleepless nights and predicted that the selectors would be biting their fingernails, adding that he hoped Meckiff was not being used as a scapegoat for the anti-throwing movement. Former Test leg spinner Bill O'Reilly—a correspondent for The Sydney Morning Herald—described the selection as "one of the most fantastic somersaults in cricket policies in our time". As a close friend of the fast bowler, umpire Egar was in a difficult situation; the duo had won a pairs lawn bowling competition just a few months earlier. Nevertheless, the paceman and umpire socialised freely at the pre-match function.

=== Incident ===
In the Test match, which began on 6 December 1963, Australia batted first; Meckiff contributed seven runs before being bowled by Peter Pollock. On the second day, after the Australian innings ended on 435, South Africa began to bat just after the luncheon interval. Bowling from the Stanley Street End, Graham McKenzie conceded 13 runs from the first over. Meckiff took the ball for the second over, bowling from the Vulture Street End to South African captain Trevor Goddard. At the same time, the South African manager Ken Viljoen set up a camera square of the wicket among the spectators and began filming the left-armer's bowling action. Meckiff was no-balled four times by Egar—who was standing at square leg—in what would be his only over of the match. After the Victorian bowled a gentle "loosener" as his first ball (and escaped a front-foot no-ball call), "the drama began". Egar ruled the second, third, fifth and ninth balls to be throws, and therefore illegitimate. After the third and fifth balls—the latter a full toss that Goddard hit for four—Benaud came over to consult his fast bowler. After the ninth ball, Meckiff and Benaud had another meeting, and the remaining three balls were deemed to be fair. In the meantime, the crowd roared loudly, heckling Egar and supporting the beleaguered bowler. Meckiff had previously been passed in five countries, having played Tests in four of these nations. Egar had cleared his bowling on five previous occasions, in three Shield matches and two Tests; the Victorian had bowled 119.1 overs in these games without incident. Egar later said "My only judgement was what I saw at the time". Benaud removed his paceman from the attack and Meckiff did not bowl again in the match, later saying he could not remember the over because he was absorbed by a feeling of complete deflation.

Meckiff conceded eight runs—Goddard's boundary and the four no-balls—from his solitary over and the tourists were eventually out for 346. Meckiff did not bat in the second innings of the weather-interrupted match; Australia declared at 1/144 before South Africa reached 1/13 when the match ended as a draw. After his single over, Meckiff's participation in the match was limited to his fielding, during which he caught Goddard from the bowling of Benaud in the South African first innings. He retired from all forms of cricket at the end of the game, but continued to proclaim that his bowling action was fair.

Barry Gibbs, the secretary of the Queensland Cricket Association and the manager of the Australian team, called the "humiliation" of Meckiff "without a doubt the most dramatic and emotion-charged" sporting moment he had witnessed. Egar's actions also ignited "one of the most emotional crowd displays in Test history", as the public backed the paceman. During Meckiff's over, the crowd expressed strong disapproval of the umpire's calls. Half an hour before the close of the day's play, proceedings were suspended for two minutes as the crowd repeatedly chanted "We want Meckiff". When play ended, spectators stormed the field and carried the fast bowler off the arena on their shoulders, hailing him as a hero. They returned to the field and formed two lanes, booing Egar from the ground. After this incident, the Queensland Police escorted the umpire to and from the match venue. The police presence at the ground was increased because of fears the crowd might attack Egar or Benaud. During the Second Test, which was held in Meckiff's home town of Melbourne, Egar was given a police escort throughout the match after receiving death threats.

=== Reaction ===
During a rest day after the second day's play the media dissected the events of the previous afternoon. The majority of reporters believed all of Meckiff's deliveries had been bowled with an identical action. Louis Duffus of the Johannesburg Star expressed "sympathy for Meckiff as well as admiration for Egar." The South African writer Charles Fortune said that Meckiff's action was "not according to the laws of cricket" although he would not call the Australian bowler a "chucker". England captain Dexter implicitly accused Meckiff of throwing, saying: "One courageous Australian umpire has brought it to a timely end".

Team manager Gibbs reported that at the end of the first day's play the Australian dressing room was stunned into silence. Egar asked Benaud for permission to enter, and after the Australian captain allowed him in, the umpire sat quietly for a period before speaking to some other players and then to Meckiff. The pair were close friends, and shook hands before putting their arms around one another's shoulders. The condemned bowler did not take Egar's judgment personally and did not have hard feelings about the incident. Egar claimed to be "the second most upset person in the world", and later added that he thought Meckiff's first ball was suspect. He said that he could have called more deliveries, but was worried whether the over would ever end.

When asked why he had not asked Meckiff to bowl at the other end to gauge the judgment of the other umpire, Lou Rowan, Benaud replied "over the years I have always accepted the umpire's decision". The Australian captain was criticised for being acquiescent, and one of his predecessors Lindsay Hassett believed Meckiff should have been used at reduced speed. Rowan later indicated his concurrence with Egar, writing in his book The Umpire's Story, "There is nothing I can now say that will alter the opinions already expressed that his [Meckiff's] delivery was unfair". For his part, Meckiff said: "the game is bigger than the individual" and he backed Benaud's decision because doing otherwise "could only have added fuel to the controversy".

Retired Test umpires Col Hoy and Les Townsend were watching at the ground when Meckiff was called. The day after the incident, both asserted that they would not have no-balled the paceman. Hoy said he had never had any problem with the bowler's action during matches in which he officiated. He described Meckiff's action as "slightly different" but attributed this to an accentuated wrist action used in an attempt to get more life out of dead pitches, rather than his elbow. Townsend watched the paceman through binoculars and deemed all of his 12 deliveries to be identical. Townsend regarded Meckiff's arm action as "peculiar" but felt he did not throw. Former Test spinners Ian Johnson and Doug Ring said Meckiff's action was fair.

After his retirement, Meckiff agreed to put his name to a series of ghost-written articles about the no-ball incident. He said that Egar's calls "hit him like a dagger in the back", but described the umpire as "a fair and just man who acted according to his convictions".

=== Allegations of a conspiracy ===
Sections of the cricket community believed Meckiff was no-balled to prove that Australia was serious about dealing with the wave of complaints regarding suspected throwing in the 1950s and 1960s. Leading cricket historian David Frith wrote: "Meckiff was a popular Australian, and won much sympathy among those who believed him innocent or to have been victimised in a 'clean-up campaign'." A dinner hosted by Don Bradman at his Adelaide home in January 1963 for visiting state captains was later cited to suggest that Meckiff may have been a sacrificial offering. At the dinner, attended by Bill Lawry of Victoria, Barry Shepherd, Ken Mackay and Benaud, Bradman showed frame-by-frame slow motion film of Meckiff and other suspect Australian bowlers, which purportedly depicted incriminating actions. This indicated Bradman's doubts over Meckiff's legitimacy, yet Bradman was one of the selectors who agreed to the bowler's inclusion in the Brisbane Test team.

Many members of the Australian media alleged a conspiracy against Meckiff. Ian McDonald of Melbourne's Sporting Globe said the bowler's action had not changed in the previous eight years and stated: "the whole affair smacks of a set-up". Sydney's Mirror labelled the paceman "the most obvious fall-guy in Australian cricket history". On the third morning of the match, former first-class cricketer Percy Beames, writing for Melbourne's The Age, claimed Meckiff had been used as a "sacrificial goat" and called for the selectors' resignation. Keith Miller wrote a column calling for Bradman's and Jack Ryder's removal from the selection panel, noting that they had watched Meckiff's performance against Western Australia which prompted his Test selection. Miller felt that if the selectors deemed the bowler illegitimate, then they should not have allowed him to be "executed" by the umpires. Jack Pollard said: "there is little doubt Meckiff was sacrificed to end the long-running controversy and the way it was done irked many cricket-lovers." Cricketer-turned-journalist Dick Whitington asserted that Benaud was aware his fast bowler had been set up, claiming that the Australian captain knew of Bradman's views on Meckiff's action. Whitington further cited the fact that Egar and Bradman had travelled from Adelaide to the Brisbane Test together as evidence of a plot. Others saw Bradman's tea-time conversation with Benaud after the no-balling as proof of a conspiracy. Benaud repudiated allegations claiming he was involved in a set-up.

Former Australian captain Hassett hinted at a conspiracy when he stated that, as the selectors must have considered Meckiff to be legitimate, then

If the selectors are right, Egar is wrong, and if he is incapable of interpreting the laws correctly, he should not stand in first-class cricket. On the other hand if the selectors as a body threw Meckiff into this arena merely to be tested by the opinion of a single umpire, they are very much guilty of passing the buck, and of exposing both the bowler and the umpire to extreme embarrassment.

The records of the Australian Board of Control attest to board member Clem Jones's protestations against Meckiff's inclusion when the selectors' proposed team list was submitted for approval. Jones cited the bowler's questionable action but the Chairman Ewart Macmillan rejected his objection as unconstitutional. Two other board members attempted to overrule the chairman, but their motion was defeated.

More than 40 years after the Meckiff incident, Jones was sure the bowler's fate had been predetermined. He said "They'd decided to do it a week before the game, so the poor bloke had no hope...I was chairman of the umpires selection committee." Jones remained convinced of Bradman's intention to have Meckiff called for throwing, something Bradman flatly denied. Gibbs remains suspicious of the motives for selecting Meckiff. He pointed out that although the pitch was conducive to spin bowling, Australia chose five specialist batsmen, two spinners and three fast bowlers. Gibbs speculated that the selection of an extra fast bowler—the most common strategy is to use four bowlers and six batsmen—instead of another batsman betrayed fears that Meckiff would be unable to complete the match. Alan Connolly remained adamant that his teammate's action was legitimate and implied a conspiracy, saying "I wasn't amazed [by Egar's call]...There was a good reason for that which I can't disclose and won't disclose." Tom Veivers, who made his Test debut for Australia in Meckiff's last match, hinted at the same. He recalled Rowan's words at the pre-match function: "It's going to be a very interesting game".

== Outside cricket ==
After finishing high school, Meckiff worked as a hardware salesman and lived in Mentone until he married and moved to Beaumaris. The couple had a son. After his retirement, the former paceman worked in advertising, and as a cricket commentator. As of 2001, he was a senior executive with Boyer Sports Media and frequently worked with cricket administrators. However, he refused to play the sport—even at social level—after the incident in Brisbane.

Meckiff played Australian rules football for Mentone in the Federal League, helping them win the premiership in 1956. He received offers to play in the Victorian Football League, the top-tier competition at the time, but declined contracts so he could pursue his cricket career. Meckiff also played golf in pennant competition and captained the Victoria Golf Club.

In retirement, the throwing issue continued to dog the former paceman. Former Australian captain and teammate Simpson wrote a book titled Captain's Story in which he assailed various cricketers—Meckiff chief among them—for throwing. Meckiff sued for libel in a five-year case, which ended with an out-of-court settlement and apology from Simpson. Despite this, Meckiff has continued to socialise with people involved in his last Test, including Simpson, Egar, Gibbs, Rowan and Peter van der Merwe, South Africa's vice-captain. He says that he never brings up the topic of the no-ball with them. Victorian and Test teammate Lawry rated Meckiff "along with Graham McKenzie, Brian Booth, Peter Burge and one or two others as really nature's gentlemen" and said his exit was "one of the saddest [days] of [Lawry's] life". Lawry credited his fellow Victorian for being dignified despite the torment and said the bowler was a "pretty fair example of the old expression that good guys run last". Connolly said "'Meckie' was one of the nicest guys. It was to his great credit that he wasn't soured by the whole incident."

== See also ==
- List of international cricketers called for throwing
- List of cricketers called for throwing in top-class cricket matches in Australia
