= Colin Egar =

Australian Test cricket umpire (1928–2008)

Col Egar
Personal information
- Full name: Colin James Egar
- Born: 30 March 1928; Malvern, Adelaide, South Australia
- Died: 4 September 2008 (aged 80); Adelaide, South Australia
- Nickname: Col
- Role: Umpire

Umpiring information
- Tests umpired: 29 (1960–1969)
- Source: ESPNcricinfo, 5 September 2008

Colin John "Col" Egar (30 March 1928 – 4 September 2008) was an Australian Test cricket umpire.

Born in Malvern, South Australia, Egar umpired in 29 Test matches between 1960 and 1969.

== First-class debut ==
Egar started his career as an umpire of Australian rules football and quickly gained a reputation for being a forthright arbiter. He became an umpire in district cricket, and gained a reputation for his willingness to no-ball suspicious bowlers for throwing. In his district career, he called bowlers on eight occasions, not counting multiple no-ball calls against a bowler in the same match.

Egar made his first-class umpiring debut during the 1956–57 season when he stood in South Australia's home Sheffield Shield match against Queensland at the Adelaide Oval. This was Egar's only appointment for the season. At the time, there were no neutral umpires, and the host association provided the officials, so Egar's Sheffield fixtures all took place at the Adelaide Oval. During that era, the Shield program consisted of eight matches for each state, with four home games.

The following season, Egar became more of a regular, standing in three of the four matches at Adelaide Oval. In 1958–59, Egar stood in all but one of South Australia's three home Shield matches, and officiated a game involving an international team for the first time. He oversaw two matches between South Australia and the touring England cricket team of Peter May, but he was not appointed in any of the five Tests.

At the end of this season, the veteran Australian Test umpire Mel McInnes retired after a controversial season and a series of questionable decisions that prompted May and English manager Freddie Brown to call for his standing down. This left a vacancy for an Australian Test umpire. During the 1959–60 Australian summer, there were no home Tests as the national team was in the Indian subcontinent. In the meantime, Egar stood in all four Shield matches at the Adelaide Oval. The 1960–61 season saw the first Tests on Australian soil since McInnes's retirement. Egar stood in South Australia's matches against Victoria, the West Indies and Tasmania, before being selected to make his Test debut.

In the match against Victoria, he made his first throwing call against a bowler at first-class level. During the match, Egar no-balled South Australian fast bowler Brian Quigley twice on the first day as Victoria batted first. He did so from the bowler's end as Quigley was trying to extract extra pace from the slow pitch. As the calls were made from the bowler's end, almost all of the spectators thought it was for Quigley overstepping the bowling mark, the most common mode of infringement; the fact that Egar made called the bowler for throwing only became apparent to most in the newspapers the next day. Quigley changed his action, but his results thereafter were not enough to gain selection.

== Test debut in the Tied Test ==
His first match was between Australia and the West Indies at Brisbane on 9–14 December 1960. The game resulted in the first tie in Test match history when Egar's partner Col Hoy adjudged Ian Meckiff run out during the final over of the match. Hoy and Egar stood in every match of that most dramatic of all Test series, and the West Indies captain Frank Worrell was full of praise for the umpiring in that tension-filled series. Hoy wrote in the newspapers about his experiences at the end of the season; at the time, the practice of player and officials concurrently doing media work was heavily frowned upon and he never umpired a Test again.

Due to his Test commitments, Egar stood in only two Shield matches for the season. In the following summer, 1961–62, Egar stood in all four Adelaide Oval Shield matches as well as a match against a touring New Zealand team. There were no Tests during the season. In the match against New Zealand, he no-balled South Australian paceman Gordon Brooks for throwing in the sixth ball of his first over. It was Brooks' tenth first-class match, having made his debut in the same season. Egar had ruled Brooks legitimate in four previous matches at first-class level, but had no-balled him in a district match in Adelaide. However, Brooks played in a further 16 matches for South Australia over the following three years without incident.

During the 1962–63 season, Egar officiated in Ashes Tests against England for the first time, standing in four of the five Tests, missing the Third Test at Sydney. He stood in four of South Australia's home matches, two in the Shield, and the others against England.

== Ian Meckiff ==
In the late 1950s and early 1960s, there was increasing concern in the cricket community about illegal bowling actions, especially as during that period there were only home umpires, rather than officials from third nations. Several conferences were held to discuss issues of enforcement and modifications to the laws of cricket. One of the main points of controversy was the Australian fast bowler Ian Meckiff, whose action had particularly angered the English press and parts of the cricket community. During the Tests in 1960–61, as well as in other first-class matches, Egar officiated over Meckiff's bowling, and deemed his bowling legitimate. The bowler noted that the umpire had told him that there was little point in changing his action.

Meckiff was not selected in Tests after some poor performances in 1960–61. In 1962–63, Meckiff was again under the spotlight. He topped the bowling averages for the Australian first-class season with 58 wickets at 19.86 from ten matches, as Victoria won the Sheffield Shield. Meckiff was hoping to regain his Test place, but was not selected despite his success. Problems arose when he was no-balled in separate matches, by Jack Kierse in a match hosted by South Australia, and another hosted by Queensland. In both matches he continued bowling without further incident.

Meckiff's performances as the leading wicket-taker during the 1962–63 season meant that he could not be justifiably denied national selection on grounds of productivity, so the matter of his legitimacy had to be resolved. Meanwhile, the retirement of pace spearhead Alan Davidson left a vacancy in the Australian team ahead of the 1963–64 home Test series against South Africa. In the first two matches of the season in Melbourne, Meckiff took 11 wickets and was recalled to the team for the First Test in Brisbane.

At the start of the season, the Australian Board of Control had issued a directive calling on the umpires to "get tough" in enforcing the laws of cricket, and asked the state associations to "back the umpires to the fullest extent". In the lead-up to the Test, Meckiff was the centre of media attention, and one report described him as cricket's "bogey man". The South Africans were reportedly stunned by Meckiff's selection, giving the impression that they considered him an illegitimate bowler. Reaction in England was also hostile, ahead of Australia's forthcoming tour in the English summer of 1964. They unequivocally called Meckiff a thrower.

The Brisbane Test was dubbed "Meckiff's Test" by the Australian media; speculation abounded that the bowler was being chosen so that he could be no-balled as a public relations effort to promote Australia's anti-throwing credentials. Keith Miller predicted that the umpires Egar and Lou Rowan would be having sleepless nights and claimed that the selectors would be biting their fingernails, and that he Meckiff might be a scapegoat for the anti-throwing movement. Many were taken aback by the circumstances of the selection. As a close friend of the fast bowler, umpire Egar was in a difficult situation; the duo had won a pairs lawn bowling competition just a few months earlier. Nevertheless, the paceman and umpire socialised freely at the pre-match function.

=== Incident ===
In the match, Australia batted first. On the second day, South Africa began to bat just after the luncheon interval. Graham McKenzie conceded 13 runs from the first over. Meckiff then took the ball for the second over, bowling from the Vulture Street End to South African captain Trevor Goddard. At the same time, the South African manager Ken Viljoen set up a camera and began filming the left-armer's bowling action. Meckiff was no-balled four times by Egar—who was standing at square leg—in what would be his only over of the match. After the Victorian bowled a gentle "loosener" as his first ball, the drama began. Egar ruled the second, third, fifth and ninth balls to be throws, and therefore illegitimate. After the third and fifth balls—the latter a full toss that Goddard hit for four—Benaud came over to consult his fast bowler. After the ninth ball, Meckiff and Benaud had another meeting, and the remaining three balls were deemed to be fair. In the meantime, the crowd roared loudly, heckling Egar and supporting the beleaguered bowler. Meckiff had previously been passed in five countries, having played Tests in four of these nations. Egar had cleared his bowling on five previous occasions, in three Shield matches and two Tests; the Victorian had bowled 119.1 overs in these games without incident. Egar later said "My only judgement was what I saw at the time". Benaud removed his paceman from the attack and Meckiff did not bowl again in the match. He retired from all forms of cricket at the end of the game, but continued to proclaim that his bowling action was fair.

Barry Gibbs, the secretary of the Queensland Cricket Association and the manager of the Australian team, said that the "humiliation" of Meckiff was "without a doubt the most dramatic and emotion-charged" sporting moment he had witnessed. Egar's actions also ignited "one of the most emotional crowd displays in Test history", as the public backed the paceman. During Meckiff's over, the crowd expressed strong disapproval of the umpire's calls. Half an hour before the close of the day's play, proceedings were suspended for two minutes as the crowd repeatedly chanted "We want Meckiff". When play ended, spectators stormed the field and carried the fast bowler off the arena on their shoulders, hailing him as a hero. They then returned to the field and formed two lanes, booing Egar from the ground. After this incident, the Queensland Police escorted the umpire to and from the match venue. The police presence at the ground was increased because of fears that the crowd might attack Egar or Benaud. During the Second Test, which was held in Meckiff's home town of Melbourne, Egar was given a police escort throughout the match after receiving death threats.

=== Reaction ===
During a rest day after the second day's play the media dissected the events of the previous afternoon. The majority of reporters believed that all of Meckiff's deliveries had been bowled with an identical action. Louis Duffus wrote that he felt "sympathy for Meckiff as well as admiration for Egar." The South African Charles Fortune wrote that Meckiff's action was "not according to the laws of cricket" although he would not call the Australian bowler a "chucker". England captain Ted Dexter implied that Meckiff was throwing, saying that "one courageous Australian umpire has brought it to a timely end".

Team manager Gibbs reported that at the end of the first day's play the Australian dressing room was stunned into silence. Egar asked Benaud for permission to enter, and after the Australian captain allowed him in, the umpire sat quietly for a period before speaking to some other players and then to Meckiff. The pair were close friends, and shook hands before putting their arms around one another's shoulders. The condemned bowler did not take Egar's judgment personally and did not have hard feelings about the incident. Egar said that he was "the second most upset person in the world", and later added that he thought Meckiff's first ball was suspect. He said that he could have called more deliveries, but was worried that the over would never end.

Benaud received criticism for not bowling Meckiff again at the other end, but Rowan later indicated that he would have agreed with Egar, writing in his book that the action was illegitimate. Retired Test umpires Hoy and Les Townsend were watching at the ground when Meckiff was called. The day after the incident, both asserted that they would not have no-balled the paceman, claiming that Meckiff's action, though unusual, was legitimate.

Meckiff later agreed to a series of ghost-written articles about the no-ball incident. He said that Egar's calls "hit him like a dagger in the back", but described the umpire as "a fair and just man who acted according to his convictions".

=== Allegations of a conspiracy ===
Sections of the cricket community believed that Meckiff was no-balled to prove that Australia was serious about dealing with the wave of complaints regarding suspected throwing in the 1950s and 1960s. A dinner hosted by board member Don Bradman in January 1963 for visiting state captains was later cited to suggest that Meckiff may have been a sacrificial offering. At the dinner, Bradman had shown film of Meckiff among others, which purportedly depicted incriminating actions. This indicated Bradman's doubts over Meckiff's legitimacy, yet Bradman was one of the selectors who oversaw Meckiff's inclusion.

Many members of the Australian media alleged a conspiracy against Meckiff, using words such as "the whole affair smacks of a set-up", "obvious fall-guy", and "sacrificial goat". Several called for Bradman and his colleagues to resign. Cricketer-turned-journalist Dick Whitington cited the fact that Egar and Bradman had travelled from Adelaide to the Brisbane Test together as evidence of a plot. Gibbs later claimed that the selection of an extra bowler for the match hinted at fears that Meckiff would not be able to bowl. Alan Connolly remained adamant that his teammate's action was legitimate and implied a conspiracy, saying "I wasn't amazed [by Egar's call]...There was a good reason for that which I can't disclose and won't disclose." Tom Veivers, who made his Test debut for Australia in Meckiff's last match, hinted at the same. He recalled that Rowan had said "It's going to be a very interesting game" at the pre-match function. For his part, Egar always denied any conspiracy had occurred or that he agreed to a premeditated course of events against Meckiff.

Egar stood in all five Tests as well as four of South Australia's home matches during 1963–64. The following season, he stood in Australia's only Test against Pakistan and four matches at Adelaide Oval.

== Eddie Illingworth ==
During the same season, 1964–65, Egar no-balled a fourth and final bowler during his career, Victoria's Eddie Illingworth. The bowler had made his first-class debut two and a half years. This had been controversial as he had twice been no-balled for throwing by two different umpires in Victorian Premier Cricket prior to his selection. Despite taking a total of 7/71 on debut, Illingworth was overlooked for further state selection for over two years. Illingworth's best performance in a Sheffield Shield match was against South Australia at the Adelaide Oval in November 1964, the same match in which he was called.

Illingworth took 4/92 in South Australia's first innings but was no-balled a total of three times by Egar and his partner Jack Ryan, both standing at square leg. He was called twice by Egar on the second and fourth deliveries of his eleventh over, and once by Ryan on the sixth ball of his fourteenth over. In the same fourteenth over, Illingworth had dismissed former Pakistani Test batsman Duncan Sharpe and Australian Test wicket-keeper Barry Jarman from the first and fourth deliveries respectively. Victorian captain Bill Lawry chose not to remove Illingworth and continued to bowl him. The state selectors were reluctant to pick Illingworth for Victoria because of the throwing allegations that surrounded him and he played in only two more matches.

In 1965–66, Egar had the busiest season of his career. He stood in all five Anglo-Australian Tests, two matches between South Australia and England, and three of his state's home Shield matches. The following summer, Egar stood in all four Shield matches at Adelaide Oval while the Test team were away in South Africa. In 1967–68, Egar stood in all four Tests against India in addition to three Shield matches and two fixtures between South Australia and India and New Zealand respectively.

Egar stood in all five Tests of the West Indian tour of Australia in 1968–69. He also officiated in two Shield matches and two games between South Australia and the West Indies at Adelaide Oval.

Egar's last match, also against the West Indies, was at Sydney from 14 to 20 February 1969. The match was won by Australia by 382 runs after Bill Lawry, the Australian captain, delayed his second-innings declaration until Australia led by 734 runs. In this match Doug Walters became the first batsman to score a double century and a century in the same match, with scores of 242 and 103. Egar's colleague was Lou Rowan.

The following season, the Test team were in India and South Africa, and Egar stood in all four of South Australia's home Shield fixtures. In 1970–71, Egar stood in one Shield match and then the tour game between South Australia and Ray Illingworth's touring Englishmen in October, and retired after the match, not standing in the Tests. During the 1960s he umpired 29 out of 30 Test matches played in Australia.

== Administration ==
Following his umpiring career, Egar turned to cricket administration, managing a number of Australian Test teams, and was the Australian Cricket Board's chairman from 1989 to 1992. Ironically, in the Australian tour of Pakistan in 1988, Egar protested to the Pakistan Board of Control over the umpiring of Mahboob Shah, following an innings loss on a grassless pitch which captain Allan Border described as a conspiracy from the word go. Steve Waugh, a member of the team, quoted Egar as claiming the umpiring is totally unacceptable. The tour was in danger of being abandoned, but Egar insisted it progress as scheduled.

== Criticism of throwing ==
Egar remained outspoken about bowling actions that he considered to be dubious in his later life. He was strongly critical of the action of the Sri Lankan world record-breaking spinner Muttiah Muralitharan. In 2002, he criticised Wisden for ranking Muralitharan the best bowler in Test history, citing his bowling action. After Muralitharan broke the world record for career Test dismissals, Egar said "As far as I am concerned they should have a separate record for bowlers with illegal actions...I've got a photo at home of Murali's arm bending at 48 degrees." Egar criticised laboratory tests on Muralitharan at the University of Western Australia as "rubbish...The only tests that matter are those conducted under match conditions...The administrators of the game have got to take the blame for letting his action go."

A public bar at the Adelaide Oval is named the "Col Egar Bar" as a tribute to him.

Egar died in September 2008 following a long illness.

== See also ==
- List of cricketers called for throwing in top-class cricket matches in Australia
