= Australian cricket team in South Africa in 1957–58 =

International cricket tour

The Australia cricket team toured South Africa from October 1957 to March 1958 and played a five-match Test series against the South Africa national cricket team. Australia won the Test series 3–0. Australia were captained by Ian Craig; South Africa by Clive van Ryneveld.

== Australian team ==
- Ian Craig (captain)
- Richie Benaud
- Peter Burge
- Jim Burke
- Alan Davidson
- John Drennan
- Les Favell
- Ron Gaunt
- Wally Grout
- Neil Harvey
- Barry Jarman
- Lindsay Kline
- Ken Mackay
- Colin McDonald
- Ian Meckiff
- Bob Simpson

Gaunt was not in the original team, but joined in early January 1958 as a reinforcement when Drennan was injured.

== Test series summary ==
=== First Test ===
23–28 December 1957
(5-day match)
Scorecard

South Africa	v	Australia
470/9d (130.6 overs); JHB Waite 115; I Meckiff 5/125 (31 overs)		368 (91.2 overs); R Benaud 122; PS Heine 6/58 (14.2 overs)
201 (78.4 overs); WR Endean 77; AK Davidson 6/34 (17.4 overs)		162/3 (73 overs); KD Mackay 65*; HJ Tayfield 2/70 (33 overs)

Match drawn
New Wanderers, Johannesburg
Umpires: A Birkett and JH McMenamin

- South Africa won the toss and elected to bat.
- 25 December was taken as a rest day.
- ATW Grout, LF Kline, I Meckiff and RB Simpson (all AUS) made their Test debuts.

=== Second Test ===
31 December 1957–3 January 1958
(5-day match)
Scorecard

Australia	v	South Africa
449 (152.2 overs); JW Burke 189; HJ Tayfield 5/120 (51 overs)		209 (86.5 overs); CB van Ryneveld 43; R Benaud 4/95 (35 overs)
		99 (f/o) (57.4 overs); TL Goddard 56; R Benaud 5/49 (21 overs)

Australia won by an innings and 141 runs
Newlands, Cape Town
Umpires: DV Collins and VJ Costello

- Australia won the toss and elected to bat.
- The match was scheduled for five days but completed in four.

=== Third Test ===
24–29 January 1958
(5-day match)
Scorecard

Australia	v	South Africa
163 (82.4 overs); ID Craig 52; NAT Adcock 6/43 (18 overs)		384 (163.7 overs); JHB Waite 134; R Benaud 5/114 (50.7 overs)
292/7 (147 overs); JW Burke 83; HJ Tayfield 3/94 (59 overs)

Match drawn
Kingsmead, Durban
Umpires: VJ Costello and W Marais

- Australia won the toss and elected to bat.
- 26 January was taken as a rest day.
- RA Gaunt (AUS) made his Test debut.

=== Fourth Test ===
7–12 February 1958
(5-day match)
Scorecard

Australia	v	South Africa
401 (149.5 overs); R Benaud 100; PS Heine 6/96 (37.5 overs)		203 (80.2 overs); KJ Funston 70; R Benaud 4/70 (20.2 overs)
1/0 (0.4 overs); CC McDonald 1*		198 (f/o) (105 overs); DJ McGlew 70; R Benaud 5/84 (41 overs)

Australia won by 10 wickets
New Wanderers, Johannesburg
Umpires: A Birkett and JH McMenamin

- Australia won the toss and elected to bat.
- 9 February was taken as a rest day.
- CGD Burger (SA) made his Test debut.

=== Fifth Test ===
28 February–4 March 1958
(5-day match)
Scorecard

South Africa	v	Australia
214 (74.6 overs); HJ Tayfield 66; LF Kline 4/33 (13.6 overs)		291 (107.3 overs); KD Mackay 77*; PS Heine 3/68 (30 overs)
144 (75.1 overs); CGD Burger 37*; AK Davidson 5/38 (26.1 overs)		68/2 (12.4 overs); ATW Grout 35*; NAT Adcock 1/18 (4 overs)

Australia won by 8 wickets
St George's Park, Port Elizabeth
Umpires: VJ Costello and W Marais

- South Africa won the toss and elected to bat.
- 2 March was taken as a rest day.
- The match was scheduled for five days but completed in four.
- PR Carlstein (SA) made his Test debut.
