= English cricket team in South Africa in 1956–57 =

International cricket tour

The England cricket team toured South Africa in the 1956–57 season. The tour was organised by the Marylebone Cricket Club and the side played five Test matches as "England" and 15 other first-class matches as "MCC". Two of the first-class matches took place in Rhodesia in what is now Zimbabwe.

England won the first two Test matches; the third was drawn; and South Africa won the final two games. The Test series was noted at the time for slow scoring, and England averaged 32.69 runs an hour in the series, while South Africa managed only 29.04.

== England team ==
The MCC team was captained by Peter May, with Doug Insole as vice-captain. The former England Test captain Freddie Brown was the tour manager.

The full team was:

Peter May; Doug Insole; Trevor Bailey; Denis Compton; Colin Cowdrey; Godfrey Evans (wicketkeeper); Jim Laker; Peter Loader; Tony Lock; Alan Oakman; Jim Parks junior; Peter Richardson; Brian Statham; Brian Taylor (wicketkeeper); Frank Tyson; Johnny Wardle

All of the players except Taylor had played in Test cricket before the tour. Oakman, Parks and Taylor did not play in any of Tests on the tour, and Taylor never appeared in Test cricket. Parks was injured soon after the tour began and flew back to the UK for treatment; he did not rejoin the tour and no replacement was sent for. The manager, Brown, appeared in one first-class match.

== Test series summary ==
=== First Test ===
24–29 December 1956
(5-day match)
Scorecard

England	v	South Africa
268 (118.5 overs); PE Richardson 117; NAT Adcock 4/36 (20 overs)		215 (89.1 overs); TL Goddard 49; TE Bailey 3/33 (15 overs)
150 (66.6 overs); DCS Compton 32; NAT Adcock 3/40 (17.6 overs)		72 (33.4 overs); PS Heine 17; TE Bailey 5/20 (15.4 overs)

England won by 131 runs
New Wanderers, Johannesburg
Umpires: JH McMenamin and W Marais

- England won the toss and elected to bat.
- 25 December was taken as a rest day.
- AI Taylor (SA) made his Test debut.

The match was noted for slow scoring, with Peter Richardson's 117 in England's first innings being at the time the slowest Test match century, taking eight hours and eight minutes to reach the 100. Richardson's 121-run fourth-wicket partnership with Colin Cowdrey was the highest of the match, Cowdrey making 59. No South African batsman reached 50, and Statham, Wardle and Bailey each took three wickets. England's second innings was also a struggle on a difficult pitch and South Africa were set 204 to win. With Tyson ill, Bailey opened the bowling with Statham and took five for 20 as South Africa were out for their lowest score in a home Test since 1898–99.

=== Second Test ===
1–5 January 1957
(5-day match)
Scorecard

England	v	South Africa
369 (135.2 overs); MC Cowdrey 101; HJ Tayfield 5/130 (53 overs)		205 (99.6 overs); JHB Waite 49; JH Wardle 5/53 (23.6 overs)
220/6d (63.5 overs); DCS Compton 64; TL Goddard 3/62 (17.5 overs)		72 (50.1 overs); TL Goddard 26; JH Wardle 7/36 (19 overs)

England won by 312 runs
Newlands, Cape Town
Umpires: DV Collins and VJ Costello

- England won the toss and elected to bat.

On a slow pitch, England's opening pair of Richardson (45) and Bailey (34) started with 76, and then Compton made 58. But the major contribution to a big total was a sixth-wicket partnership of 93 between Cowdrey, who made 101 and Evans (62). As in the first Test, no South African batsman made 50. Wardle took five wickets for 53. Injuries to Neil Adcock and Clive van Ryneveld restricted South Africa to defensive bowling and fielding, but Compton (64) and Cowdrey (61) scored fast enough to allow May to declare, setting South Africa 385 to win in eight hours. They had little answer to Wardle, who took seven for 36 to finish with match figures of 12 for 89. In the South African second innings, Russell Endean was out handled the ball when he touched a ball that had flown upwards from his bat and threatened to fall on his stumps. It was the first time any batsman had been out in this manner in Test cricket.

=== Third Test ===
25–30 January 1957
(5-day match)
Scorecard

England	v	South Africa
218 (94.3 overs); TE Bailey 80; NAT Adcock 4/39 (15.3 overs)		283 (96.2 overs); RA McLean 100; JH Wardle 5/61 (20.2 overs)
254 (107.7 overs); DJ Insole 110*; HJ Tayfield 8/69 (37.7 overs)		142/6 (58 overs); KJ Funston 44; JC Laker 2/29 (18 overs)

Match drawn
Kingsmead, Durban
Umpires: BV Malan and W Marais

- England won the toss and elected to bat.
- 27 January was taken as a rest day.
- AJ Pithey (SA) made his Test debut.

Richardson (68) and Bailey (80) opened with a stand of 115, during which they scored 103 runs in two hours before lunch on the first day. Thereafter, England surrendered the initiative, and Tayfield bowled 14 consecutive maidens, nine of them to Bailey. For South Africa, Tony Pithey, in his first Test, put on 65 with Trevor Goddard, who made 69, and then Roy McLean hit South Africa's only century of the series. The two first innings took until the tea interval on the third day. England were in trouble at 79 for three in the second innings with Bailey also injured, but Insole made 110 in six hours and 10 minutes and was not out when the innings ended. Hugh Tayfield's eight wickets for 69 runs in England's second innings was the best return by a South African bowler ever, beating the eight for 70 by Tip Snooke in 1905–06. Set 190 to win in four hours and 10 minutes, South Africa were unable to score quickly enough against accurate bowling and the match ended in a draw.

=== Fourth Test ===
15–20 February 1957
(5-day match)
Scorecard

South Africa	v	England
340 (101.6 overs); RA McLean 93; TE Bailey 3/54 (21 overs)		251 (114.2 overs); PBH May 61; HJ Tayfield 4/79 (37 overs)
142 (60 overs); TL Goddard 49; JB Statham 3/37 (13 overs)		214 (78 overs); DJ Insole 68; HJ Tayfield 9/113 (37 overs)

South Africa won by 17 runs
New Wanderers, Johannesburg
Umpires: JH McMenamin and BV Malan

- South Africa won the toss and elected to bat.
- 17 February was taken as a rest day.
- CAR Duckworth (SA) made his Test debut.

Tayfield's record for the best bowling return by a South African in a Test match, set in the Third Test, lasted only three weeks. In England's second innings, he took nine for 113 with the final wicket a catch by his brother, Arthur, who was fielding as a substitute. South Africa had started well, with a second wicket stand of 112 between Goddard (67) and John Waite (61) before McLean made 93. May made his best score of the series, 61, and Insole and Compton passed 40, but South Africa led by 89. Goddard made 49 as South Africa lost cheap wickets, and England were set 232 to win with three-quarter of an hour plus a whole day to get them. Richardson (39), Insole (68) and Cowdrey (55) gave them hope, and at tea on the final day, England needed just 46 with four wickets remaining. But Tayfield, who bowled throughout the final day, took the lot with 17 runs to spare.

=== Fifth Test ===
1–5 March 1957
(5-day match)
Scorecard

South Africa	v	England
164 (87 overs); WR Endean 70; TE Bailey 3/23 (25 overs)		110 (61.3 overs); TE Bailey 41; NAT Adcock 4/20 (11.3 overs)
134 (80.7 overs); TL Goddard 30; FH Tyson 6/40 (23 overs)		130 (58.3 overs); FH Tyson 23; HJ Tayfield 6/78 (24.3 overs)

South Africa won by 58 runs
St George's Park, Port Elizabeth
Umpires: VJ Costello and W Marais

- South Africa won the toss and elected to bat.
- 3 March was taken as a rest day.
- The match was scheduled for five days but completed in four.

This is the slowest Test in history, with scoring at a rate of 1.40 runs per six balls. A newly-laid pitch made batting difficult throughout, with unpredictable bounce and many balls that kept low. Endean made 70 in South Africa's first innings and that was by some distance the highest score of the match. Bailey made an uncharacteristically pugnacious 41, but only two other England batsmen reached doubled figures in the first innings. Tyson then took six for 40 in South Africa's second innings, but with runs difficult to obtain against the faster bowlers, Tayfield's off-spinners profited in England's second innings and his six for 78 gave him 37 wickets in the series, a record for a South African player. The match was Denis Compton's last Test.
