= Brian Quigley =

Australian cricketer

Personal information
- Full name: Brian Maxwell Quigley
- Born: 27 December 1935 (age 90); Henley Beach, South Australia, Australia
- Batting: Right-handed
- Bowling: Right-arm fast-medium

Domestic team information
- Years: Team
- 1958–59 to 1960–61: South Australia

Career statistics
Competition	First-class
Matches	11
Runs scored	158
Batting average	9.87
100s/50s	0/0
Top score	30
Balls bowled	2667
Wickets	32
Bowling average	35.68
5 wickets in innings	1
10 wickets in match	0
Best bowling	7/39
Catches/stumpings	5/0
- Source: Cricinfo, 5 February 2018

Brian Maxwell Quigley (born 27 December 1935) is a former cricketer who played first-class cricket for South Australia from early in 1959 to late in 1960.

A pace bowler, Quigley took 27 wickets at an average of 30.96 in 1959-60, his only full season of first-class cricket. In the match against Queensland at the Adelaide Oval he took 7 for 39 in the first innings.

In the first match of the 1960-61 season he was no-balled for throwing by Col Egar, and never played first-class cricket again.
