= Australian cricket team in New Zealand in 1956–57 =

International cricket tour

An Australian national cricket team captained by Ian Craig toured New Zealand between February and April 1957. They played 12 matches, seven of which were first-class, including three matches against New Zealand, but these were not granted Test status. The Australians won one and drew two of the international matches, and won the other four first-class matches.

== Team ==
- Ian Craig (captain)
- Richie Benaud
- Peter Burge
- John Drennan
- Les Favell
- Ron Gaunt
- Neil Harvey
- Barry Jarman
- Lindsay Kline
- Johnny Martin
- Ian Meckiff
- Norm O'Neill
- Bob Simpson
- Bill Watson

It was a young team: Craig was 21; the oldest player, Harvey, was 28; and the youngest player, O'Neill, was 19.

== Matches ==
The Australians (249 and 223 for 5) won the first game against Canterbury (229 and 241) by five wickets. Benaud took four wickets and Burge scored a century.

The next game against Southland was drawn. Southland were dismissed for 84, Gaunt taking 6-23. The Australians made 237 for 6, Favell scoring 81 and Watson 74, before rain washed out the second day.

The Australians (344) beat Otago (187 and 55) by an innings and 102 runs. Harvey scored 161 and Kline took six wickets and Meckiff five.

The Australians (137 for 8 declared) beat a combined team from Ashburton County, South Canterbury and North Otago (43 and 76) by an innings and 18 runs in Timaru, Meckiff taking 8 for 19 in the first innings.

=== First Unofficial Test ===
Australia (216 and 284 for 3 declared) played New Zealand (268 and 112 for 2) in Christchurch, a match that ended in a draw. Craig scored 123 not out in the second innings.

The Australians (424) beat Wairarapa (50 and 157) by an innings. Watson scored 136.

=== Second Unofficial Test ===
Australia (215 and 146 for 6) drew the second game against New Zealand (249) in Wellington, Benaud taking 6 for 79. For New Zealand, Bert Sutcliffe scored 107, and Harry Cave took eight wickets.

The Australians (478 for 9 declared) drew against Poverty Bay (122 and 58 for 5). Benaud and Harvey scored centuries.

The Australians (304) beat Auckland (128 and 122) by an innings and 54 runs, Meckiff taking nine wickets.

The Australians (213 for 5 declared) drew with Waikato (93 and 30 for 3), Martin taking five wickets.

Australia (272 and 58 for 0) beat Central Districts (176 and 153) by ten wickets in New Plymouth, Benaud scoring a century and taking eight wickets.

=== Third Unofficial Test ===
In the third and final unofficial test in Auckland, Australia (350 for 8 declared) beat New Zealand (198 and 161) by ten wickets. Martin took seven wickets for the game, Meckiff and Benaud took six each, and O'Neill scored a century.

Neil Harvey headed the batting aggregates in first-class games with 448 runs at 49.77. Benaud took 32 wickets at 19.31.
