= John Drennan (cricketer) =

South Australian first-class cricketer

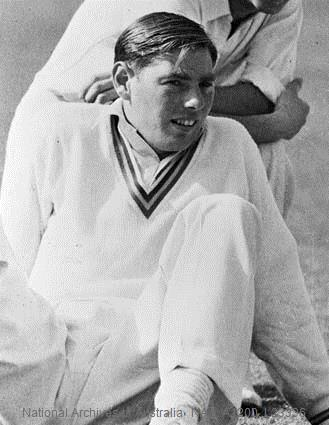
- Drennan in 1957

Personal information
- Born: 13 November 1932 (age 93); West Croydon, South Australia
- Batting: Right-handed
- Bowling: Right-arm fast-medium

Domestic team information
- Years: Team
- 1953/54–1958/59: South Australia

Career statistics
Competition	First-class
Matches	46
Runs scored	569
Batting average	11.85
100s/50s	0/1
Top score	63*
Balls bowled	8,721
Wickets	136
Bowling average	25.66
5 wickets in innings	6
10 wickets in match	0
Best bowling	6/69
Catches/stumpings	12/–
- Source: CricketArchive, 28 April 2014

John Drennan (born 13 November 1932) is a former first-class cricketer for South Australia. He toured New Zealand in 1956–57 and South Africa in 1957–58 with the Australian team but did not play Test cricket.

== Early career ==
A tall fast-medium bowler, able to swing the ball either way, Drennan made his first-class debut in the 1953–54 season, taking 17 wickets for South Australia in the Sheffield Shield at an average of 32.88. When the New Zealanders played a match in Adelaide at the end of the season he took 5 for 83 in the New Zealanders' first innings of 459.

He took 17 wickets at 24.23 in 1954–55, including 5 for 58 and 4 for 42 against Queensland. Most significantly, he took four cheap wickets, all of major batsmen, in South Australia's narrow loss to the touring MCC, and was selected to open the bowling for an Australian XI against MCC in Melbourne a week later.

He took 6 for 82 against Queensland in 1955–56 and played in a trial match that was held to help the national selectors choose the team for the tour of England in 1956. He took four wickets in that match, and finished the season with 26 wickets at 26.96, as well as scoring 176 runs at 29.33, but the last fast-bowling place in the touring side went to Pat Crawford.

In 1956–57 Drennan took 23 wickets at 27.34, including his career-best figures of 6 for 69 against Victoria.

== Playing for Australia ==
After the 1956–57 Australian season, a young Australian team of 14 players toured New Zealand, playing seven first-class matches, including three against the national team. Drennan was one of three fast bowlers, alongside Ian Meckiff and Ron Gaunt. He took wickets consistently in the provincial matches and played in the last two against New Zealand, finishing with 22 wickets at 12.50 in all six matches, though he took only two wickets against New Zealand.

Drennan was selected for the tour to South Africa in 1957–58. He took 5 for 53 against Rhodesia in the first innings of the first match, and 5 for 43 and 2 for 33 in the innings victory over Border. But in the second innings of the match against Eastern Province shortly before the First Test, he broke down in his 11th over, tearing a hamstring muscle after taking 3 for 25. He played in four of the remaining matches on tour but bowled little and took only one wicket.

== Later career ==
Drennan played two matches for South Australia in 1958–59 without taking a wicket. Thereafter, although he continued to play club cricket he played no more first-class matches. His first-class career ended just a few days after his 26th birthday.

In 1960 he played as the professional for Rishton in the Lancashire League, taking 81 wickets at 13.05 and scoring 430 runs at 19.55. He became a cricket coach.

== Personal life ==
Drennan married Eril Homburg, a basketballer for the Australian women's team in the 1957 World Championship.
