= Chucker =

The term chucker can have several different meanings.

- Chucker, in cricket is a derisive slang term for a bowler who is believed to throw, rather than bowl, the ball.
- A chukka is a 7-minute period of play in polo.
- Chukar partridge (Alectoris chukar), a bird
