= Doug Insole =

English cricketer (1926–2017)

Personal information
- Full name: Douglas John Insole
- Born: 18 April 1926; Clapton, London, England
- Died: 6 August 2017 (aged 91)
- Batting: Right-handed
- Bowling: Right-arm medium

International information
- National side: England
- Test debut: 20 July 1950 v West Indies
- Last Test: 30 May 1957 v West Indies

Career statistics
| Competition | Test | First-class |
|---|---|---|
| Matches | 9 | 450 |
| Runs scored | 408 | 25,241 |
| Batting average | 27.19 | 37.61 |
| 100s/50s | 1/1 | 54/126 |
| Top score | 110* | 219* |
| Balls bowled | – | 9,020 |
| Wickets | – | 138 |
| Bowling average | – | 33.91 |
| 5 wickets in innings | – | 1 |
| 10 wickets in match | – | 0 |
| Best bowling | – | 5/22 |
| Catches/stumpings | 8/– | 366/6 |
- Source: Cricinfo, 6 November 2022

Douglas John Insole CBE (18 April 1926 – 5 August 2017) was an English cricketer, who played for Cambridge University, Essex and in nine Test matches for England, five of them on the 1956–57 tour of South Africa, where he was vice-captain to Peter May. After retiring from playing, he was prominent in cricket administration, and served as chairman of the England selectors and as President of the Marylebone Cricket Club (MCC).

== Life and career ==
Insole was born in Clapton, London, attended the Monoux School, Walthamstow, and lived most of his adult life in Chingford. He read history at St Catharine's College, Cambridge, where he was captain of Cambridge University's cricket team. Playing as an amateur, he scored 20,113 first-class runs for Essex, the ninth highest aggregate for the club. He played as a batsman who also occasionally bowled and kept wicket, and was captain of the Essex team from 1950 to 1960. He was one of the Wisden Cricketers of the Year in 1956. He was President of the Marylebone Cricket Club (MCC) for twelve months, beginning on 1 October 2006. For his many services to cricket, Insole was appointed a CBE in 1979.

Insole was chairman of selectors for England in the 1960s, and in 1968, he was criticized for presiding over the non-selection of Basil D'Oliveira for a tour to South Africa. Only later did it become generally known that the selectors had been pressured into omitting D'Oliveira because he was a 'coloured' South African and his inclusion in a team to visit the country, then under apartheid, was thought to be undiplomatic.

Also during Insole's time Geoffrey Boycott was dropped, in 1967 after having scored 246 not out. Boycott admitted to still feeling aggrieved about this over 40 years later, while commenting on the third Test between New Zealand and England at Napier on 24 March 2008 and again during the Test Match Special commentary of England against the West Indies at Edgbaston on 7 June 2012, where he said that Insole "should have spelt his name with an A!" Again on 9 August 2014 during the 4th Test against India at Old Trafford, Insole's name was mentioned and Boycott reiterated his thoughts on how Insole's name should be spelt.

Insole was a first team footballer for the amateur Corinthian-Casuals F.C., and played in the 1956 FA Amateur Cup final, before they lost to Bishop Auckland in a replay. He managed the 1978–79 and 1982–83 Ashes tours to Australia, and for nine years to 2006 was chair of the European Cricket Council. Insole died on 5 August 2017, aged 91. His death was announced by Essex County Cricket Club the following day.
