= Bill Watson (cricketer) =

Australian cricketer (1931–2018)

Personal information
- Full name: William James Watson
- Born: 31 January 1931; Randwick, Sydney, New South Wales, Australia
- Died: 29 December 2018 (aged 87); Concord, Sydney, New South Wales, Australia
- Batting: Right-handed

International information
- National side: Australia
- Test debut (cap 201): 25 February 1955 v England
- Last Test: 14 May 1955 v West Indies

Domestic team information
- Years: Team
- 1953/54–1960/61: New South Wales

Career statistics
Competition	Test	FC
Matches	4	41
Runs scored	106	1,958
Batting average	17.66	32.09
100s/50s	0/0	6/5
Top score	30	206
Catches/stumpings	2/–	26/–
- Source: Cricinfo, 14 October 2022

William James Watson (31 January 1931 – 29 December 2018) was an Australian cricketer who played in four Test matches in 1955. He played first-class cricket for New South Wales from 1953–54 to 1960–61.

== Biography ==
A right-handed opening batsman, Watson made 155 for New South Wales against the MCC at Sydney in 1954–55 in his second first-class match. Largely on the strength of that innings, and after only four first-class matches, he was selected in the Sydney Test that began on 25 February 1955, opening with Colin McDonald. He made only 18 and 3, but managed to impress selectors enough that he was picked for the West Indies tour a few weeks later. Although he scored 122 against Barbados, Watson failed to find form against the West Indians in the Tests, scoring 27, 6, 22 not out, 30 and 0, and was dropped after the Fourth Test.

Watson scored strongly for New South Wales in the 1956-57 domestic season, with 664 runs at 44.26. The season included his highest score, 206, at number five, in an innings victory over Western Australia in Perth, and, opening the batting again, 50 and 198 against Queensland in Sydney. He was selected for an Australian team that toured New Zealand at the end of the season, but made only 23 runs in four first-class matches and was overlooked for selection on the tour to South Africa in 1957–58. In 14 matches in the next four seasons, he made only 450 runs at 25.00, and he retired after the 1960–61 season.

Watson worked as a produce agent at the Sydney City Markets.
