= Scotch Taylor =

South African cricketer (1925–2004)

Cricket information
- Batting: Right-handed
- Bowling: Legbreak

International information
- National side: South Africa
- Only Test: 24 December 1956 v England

Career statistics
Competition	Test	First-class
Matches	1	52
Runs scored	18	2,717
Batting average	9.00	31.59
100s/50s	0/0	6/11
Top score	12	180
Balls bowled	–	2,517
Wickets	–	32
Bowling average	–	30.81
5 wickets in innings	–	0
10 wickets in match	–	0
Best bowling	–	4/52
Catches/stumpings	0/–	32/–
- Source: Cricinfo, 15 November 2022

Alistair Innes "Scotch" Taylor (25 July 1925 – 7 February 2004) was a South African sportsman who played first-class cricket and hockey for Transvaal, and captained the Transvaal cricket team for four seasons. Taylor represented South Africa in one cricket Test in 1956. He was an alumnus of the King Edward VII School, set up a squash section in the Old Edwardians club, and was elected president of the South African Hockey Union.

Taylor died of a stroke at the age of 78.

== Cricket career ==
Born 25 July 1925 in Johannesburg, Taylor was a top-order batsman, and made his Currie Cup debut as an opener against Rhodesia in 1950–51. He scored his first century in the next match, as Griqualand West were defeated by an innings and 332 runs and Taylor added 204 for the first wicket with South Africa Test veteran Eric Rowan, who broke the previous Currie Cup record score during the game. Transvaal won the 1950–51 Currie Cup, drawing only one match, and with 368 runs Taylor finished tenth in the Currie Cup runs tally, only behind Rowan for Transvaal. In the 1951–52 season, Taylor was out of the team and Transvaal relegated to Section B, but he returned with a hundred and four wickets in a preseason draw with Natal in November 1952. And though he fell to 25th place in the seasonal runs tally, he hit 164 in an innings win over Border, where he added 274 with Rowan for the first wicket. He did, however, record six scores below 20, and was dropped for the return clash with Border, where Transvaal lost by an innings. His bowling was also utilised, as he took 10 wickets at a bowling average of 32.30 in the season.

There was no Currie Cup the following season, but Taylor still played three first class games, though he was relegated down the order. Against the touring New Zealanders Taylor batted at number seven; in a rain-affected game at Ellis Park, Transvaal hit 145 for eight in 29 overs, with Taylor slapping Tony MacGibbon, Bob Blair and John Richard Reid for 64 runs, 40 more than any other Transvaal batsman. Transvaal declared overnight, trailing by 71 runs, but New Zealand batted out the day for a draw.

Without Taylor, Transvaal won their first game of the 1954–55, but Taylor played in the match against defending champions Western Province, making a first-class highest score of 180 as Transvaal won by an innings and 306 runs. The following week against Natal, he and Ken Funston took Transvaal within 32 runs of Natal's first innings total with eight wickets in hand, but Hugh Tayfield and Ian Smith, and Taylor was then bowled by Tayfield for nine as Transvaal made 99 in pursuit of a target of 246 to win. As Trevor Goddard's 55 helped Natal bat out 46 overs for the draw in the return leg, where Taylor hit 61 of his team's 423 runs in two innings, and Transvaal also failed to beat Western Province, they had to be content with second place; with 461 runs, the most Taylor had made in a Currie Cup season, Taylor finished seventh in the runs tally but topped the batting averages.

Taylor got his captaincy debut the following season, leading his team to a 52-run win over Eastern Province and the league lead, but followed it up by getting bowled by Hugh Roy (a medium-pacer with a career bowling average of 42) as Transvaal chased 272 for their third win. Despite Russell Endean's unbeaten 91, Transvaal lost, and Western Province got off to the start that would eventually lead to the Currie Cup title. Transvaal also lost their other clash with Western Province, as they chased 120 with eight wickets down on a rain-affected wicket. Taylor top-scored after being put in to open. However, he only got one fifty in the season, and with 235 runs he finished 34th on the Currie Cup runs table.

There was no Currie Cup cricket the following season, as England toured and played 20 first-class matches. However, there was a first-class match between Transvaal and Natal, and after a run out in the first innings Taylor hit 85 as Transvaal recovered from a 145-run first innings deficit to win the game by three wickets. Taylor played in two games for Transvaal and a South African XI against the tourists, and with captain Jackie McGlew out of the Test squad with an injury he was picked for the first Test starting on Christmas Eve. He ended with 12 and 6 in his two innings, as England won the Test by 131 runs. McGlew returned for the second Test, but was unable to play again, but now Rhodesia opener Tony Pithey was preferred to Taylor, who ended the season with a first class batting average of 22.

The next season was little better. Though Transvaal again beat Natal, Taylor once again got out in single figures, and in his two matches against the touring Australians he failed to make fifty even once, thus failing to pass 50 for the first time since his one-game season in 1949–50. Three fifties the following season helped him up the batting average to 24.92 as the Currie Cup was once again played for, and in a rain-affected season he finished 20th in the runs tally and Transvaal won the Cup after a win over Western Province and a draw with Natal in the final two games. Taylor was captain in four of the six games.

His last hundred came the following season, in a 197-run stand with Russell Endean as Border were defeated by an innings and 44 runs, with Transvaal losing only two wickets. Taylor made 353 runs, tenth in the Currie Cup, but only made 15 and 0 in the title decider against Natal, which Natal drew to win the title after making Transvaal follow on. He made his final game against the International Cavaliers side that toured South Africa in the early months of the 1960–61 season, making 7 and 41 against an opening-bowler pair of Fred Trueman and Brian Statham. He died 7 February 2004 in Johannesburg.
