= Christopher Burger =

South African cricketer (1935–2014)

Chris Burger
Personal information
- Full name: Christopher George de Villiers Burger
- Born: 12 July 1935; Randfontein, Transvaal, South Africa
- Died: 4 June 2014 (aged 78); Howick, KwaZulu-Natal, South Africa
- Batting: Right-handed
- Bowling: Right-arm medium

International information
- National side: South Africa

Domestic team information
- Years: Team
- 1955-56 to 1965-66: Natal

Career statistics
Competition	Tests	First-class
Matches	2	48
Runs scored	62	2073
Batting average	20.66	30.04
100s/50s	0/0	2/15
Top score	37*	131
Balls bowled	–	26
Wickets	–	1
Bowling average	–	17.00
5 wickets in innings	–	0
10 wickets in match	–	0
Best bowling	–	1/8
Catches/stumpings	1/–	47/–
- Source: Cricinfo, 12 June 2023

Christopher George de Villiers Burger (12 July 1935 – 5 June 2014) was a South African cricketer who played in two Tests in 1958.

Chris Burger went to school at Michaelhouse, and represented Natal Schools at rugby union and South African Schools at cricket in 1953 and 1954. He was an attacking middle-order batsman who played first-class cricket for Natal from 1956 to 1966. After making useful runs for Natal in their two matches against the touring Australians in 1957–58 he was selected in South Africa's team for the Fourth and Fifth Tests. He top-scored with 37 not out in the second innings of the Fifth Test, but it was only enough to avert an innings defeat, and Australia went on to win by eight wickets.

Burger toured England in 1961 with the South African Fezela XI of promising young players. His most successful season was 1962–63, when he made 540 runs at an average of 45.00. He also made his highest score that season, 131 in 149 minutes against Eastern Province, when Natal scored 468 for 6 on New Year's Eve and went on to win by an innings and 234 runs.
