= Eril Homburg =

Australian basketball player

No. 6 – Opals
- League: Basketball SA

Personal information
- Born: 16 October 1936 Adelaide, South Australia, Australia
- Died: 16 December 2017 (aged 81) Adelaide

Eril Maxine Homburg (16 October 1936 – 16 December 2017) was an Australian women's basketball player.

== Biography ==
Homburg represented South Australia at basketball. She played in every match for the Australian team at the 1957 FIBA World Championship for Women, hosted by Brazil.

== Personal life ==
She married John Drennan, a South Australian cricketer who toured New Zealand and South Africa with the Australian team in the 1950s.
