= Col Hoy =

Australian cricket umpire (1922–1999)

Colin Hoy (9 May 1922 at Windsor, Queensland – 24 March 1999 at Brisbane, Queensland), was an Australian cricket Test match umpire, the first Queenslander to be appointed.

Hoy took to umpiring after becoming frustrated by a run of batting failures in Brisbane's grade cricket competition, and stood in his debut First-class match in January 1952.

He umpired nine Test matches between 1954 and 1961. His first match was between Australia and England at Brisbane from 26 November to 1 December 1954, won by Australia by an innings with centuries to Neil Harvey and Arthur Morris. Hoy's partner in this match was Mel McInnes.

Johnnie Moyes, writing in 1959 when Hoy was a current Test umpire, stated that "he is young, has excellent eyesight and the keenness to study his art. … He should be in the forefront for years."

His last Test match – in front of a world record crowd of over 90,000 on the second day - was between Australia and the West Indies from 10 to 15 February 1961, a close match won by Australia by 2 wickets. In this most dramatic of all Test series, Hoy stood in every Test with Col Egar. In the first Test, at Brisbane, Hoy gave Ian Meckiff run out to record the first tie in Test history. The West Indies captain Frank Worrell was full of praise for the calm and unobtrusive competence of the umpiring in that tension-filled series.

After that series, Hoy retired from umpiring to concentrate on business and grade cricket in Brisbane, playing for the Valley District Cricket Club until 1988. He returned to umpiring for the World Series Cricket tour of 1978–79. His working life was spent in the retail trade and with Ansett Airlines, and he was the Australian rules football reporter for the Brisbane Courier-Mail.

== See also ==
- Australian Test Cricket Umpires
- List of test umpires
