= Alfred Birkett =

South African cricket umpire

Personal information
- Born: 3 August 1908; Cockermouth, England
- Died: 8 February 1960 (aged 51); Lourence Marques, Mozambique

Umpiring information
- Tests umpired: 2 (1957–1958)
- Source: Cricinfo, 1 July 2013

Alfred Birkett (3 August 1908 – 8 February 1960) was a South African cricket umpire. He stood in two Test matches between 1957 and 1958.

== See also ==
- List of Test cricket umpires
