= Throwing (cricket) =

Illegal bowling action in the sport

Throwing, commonly referred to as chucking, is an illegal bowling action in the sport of cricket. This occurs when a bowler straightens the bowling arm when delivering the ball. Throws are not allowed when a bowler bowls to a batsman. If the umpire deems that the ball has been thrown, they will call a no-ball, which means the batsman cannot be given out from that delivery.

After biomechanical testing showed that all bowlers flex their extended arms to some degree, rules were changed. Current regulations of the International Cricket Council (ICC) set a limit of 15 degrees of permissible straightening of the elbow joint for all bowlers in international cricket. This law applies between the point at which the bowling arm passes above shoulder height and the point at which the ball is released. The limit is to allow only the natural flexing of the elbow joint which happens during the course of legal delivery.

The charge of 'throwing' against a bowler is one of the most serious and controversial that can be made in cricket, as a bowler with an illegal action must take steps to correct their action or face being banned from the game.

== Overview ==
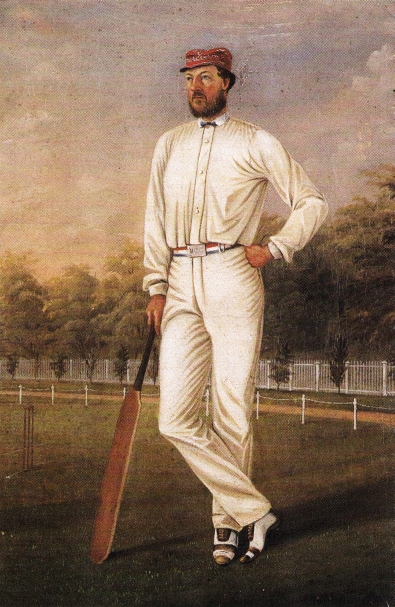
Tom Wills, the first Australian to be called for throwing in a top-class match

Law 21, Clause 2 defines a fair delivery with respect to the arm:

A ball is fairly delivered in respect of the arm if, once the bowler's arm has reached the level of the shoulder in the delivery swing, the elbow joint is not straightened partially or completely from that instant until the ball has left the hand. This definition shall not debar a bowler from flexing or rotating the wrist in the delivery swing

== History ==
Before the advent of developed biomechanical and audiovisual technology, Law 24 Clause 3 was implemented by the field umpires, who judged a delivery as illegal or "thrown" on visual judgement alone. The law against throwing has not changed in its essence since overarm bowling was legalised in 1864.

=== 1800s ===
Tom Wills, Australia's most revered cricketer of the mid-19th century, was also its most controversial. He was often accused of throwing and later even admitted to it. Many of his contemporaries recalled his trickery: "[Wills] used to say to the umpire, 'Just look at my feet, will you; I have a bad habit now and then of going over the crease.' The umpire would look at Tom's feet, and Tom would let go a throw for all he was worth." In 1872 Wills became the first cricketer to be called for throwing in a major Australian match, effectively ending his first-class career.

In the early 1880s there were a number of bowlers who were widely considered to have unfair actions, with the Lancashire pair of Jack Crossland and George Nash coming in for particular criticism. After playing for Kent against Lancashire in 1885, when he faced the bowling of Crossland and Nash, Lord Harris decided to take action. He persuaded the Kent committee to cancel the return fixture. Later that season, Crossland was found to have broken his residential qualification for Lancashire by living in Nottinghamshire and Nash dropped out of the side. Thus the two counties resumed playing each other the following season. Harris's Wisden obituarist wrote: "there can be no doubt the action of Lord Harris, even if it did not entirely remove the throwing evil, had a very healthy effect on the game."

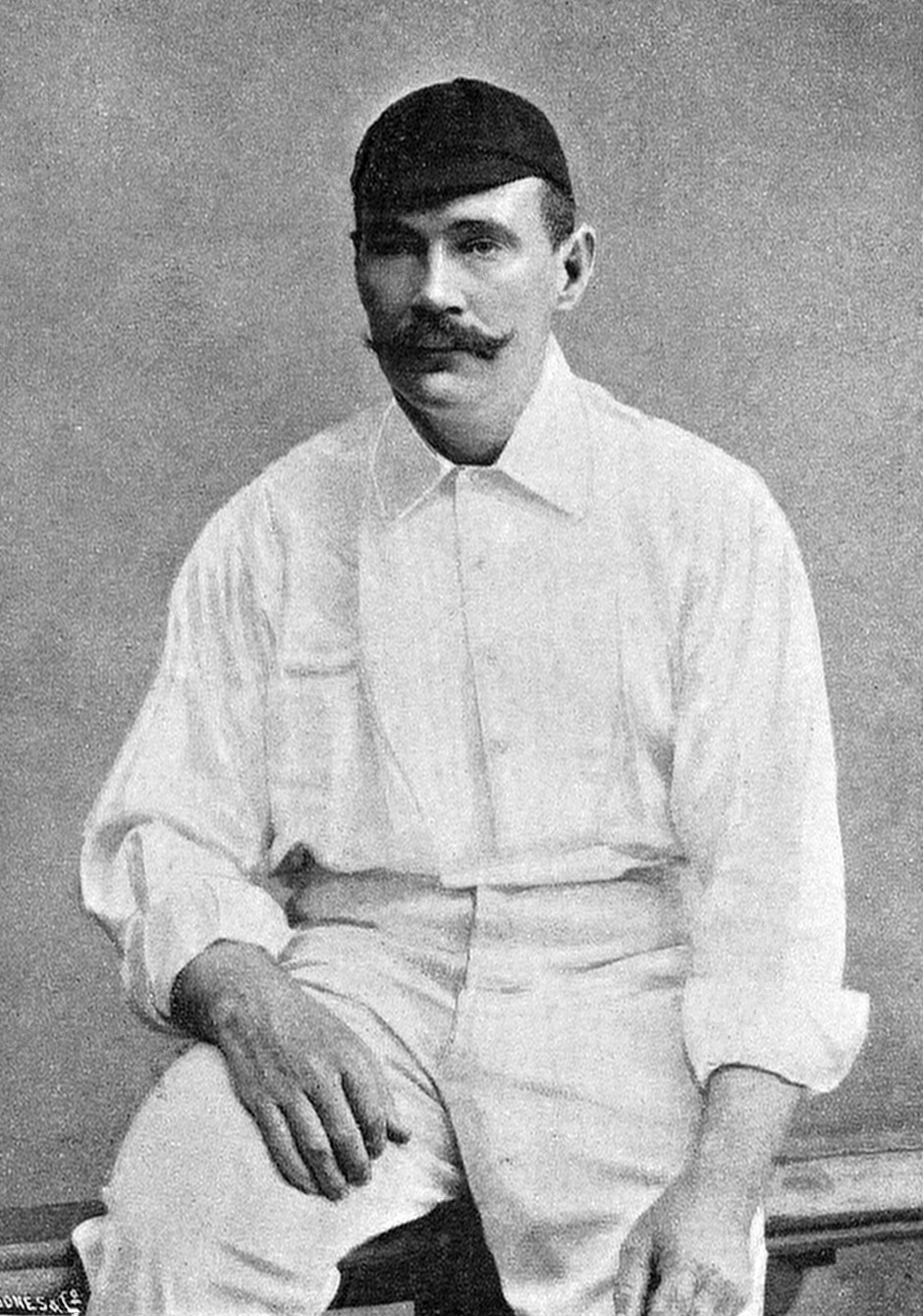
Umpire Jim Phillips no-balled several prominent bowlers for throwing.

Sydney Pardon, the editor of Wisden, accused quick bowler Ernest Jones of throwing during Australia's tour of England in 1896 but it was left to an Australian umpire, Jim Phillips, to "call" Jones for throwing in the Melbourne Test in 1897. The same umpire ended the great C. B. Fry's bowling career by calling him for throwing. Pardon considered the end of the career of the famous Corinthian bowler "a case of long-delayed justice".

Phillips went on to call Lancashire and England fast bowler Arthur Mold in 1900 and 1901, all but ending his productive career. Mold took 1,673 wickets in first-class cricket at only 15.54 apiece, bowling at high pace with a sharp 'break back' from just a four pace run up, but his bowling had always attracted as much controversy as praise. He took 192 wickets in 1895 and was a Wisden Cricketer of the Year in 1892 but he left the first-class scene after the 1901 season and Phillips' intervention.

=== Early 1900s ===
The Australian aboriginal fast bowler Eddie Gilbert was another fast bowler who generated extreme pace from a remarkably short run. Standing 5 feet 7 inches (170 cm) tall and 9 stone (130 lb; 57 kg) in weight he took wickets at a prodigious rate in the late 1920s in Queensland club cricket. He was chosen for Queensland against New South Wales Colts in 1930 and took 6 wickets but the Brisbane Courier's correspondent "Long On" was moved to describe his whipped catapult action as "almost a throw". He was picked for Queensland's Sheffield Shield side and bowled with great success. Queensland selectors responded to complaints from New South Wales by filming his arm action in slow motion but took no action against him. His most famous spell came against Don Bradman on 6 November 1931. He dismissed the NSW opener with his first ball, a vicious bouncer, then knocked Bradman's bat out of his hands with the next. The next delivery knocked Bradman over and the third had him caught behind. A month later, playing against Victoria, he was repeatedly called for throwing. He played on for Queensland, bowling at a reduced pace, and in 1934–35 headed the Queensland averages. He was a victim of legislation outlawing intimidatory bowling, in the wake of the Bodyline affair and retired in 1936, having taken 87 first-class wickets at 29.21.

=== 1950s ===
An epidemic of throwing plagued cricket in the 1950s. Umpire Frank Chester wanted to no-ball the South African Cuan McCarthy for throwing in 1951 but was blocked by the authorities at Lords, Plum Warner commenting diplomatically "These people are our guests".

Surrey and England left-arm spinner Tony Lock was generally thought to throw his dangerous faster ball; on one occasion Doug Insole inquired if he had been 'bowled or run out' after Lock had shattered his stumps. He was in fact called for throwing in county cricket early in his career, and is said to have cleaned up his action towards the end of his career after seeing a bowler on video, commenting on how poor the bowler's action was and being shocked to discover it was himself.

Left-arm paceman Ian Meckiff helped Australia to regain the Ashes in 1958–59 but feelings ran high in the England team and press that Meckiff and others had bowled outside the laws and spirit of the game. Meckiff was also alleged, along with several other Australia bowlers to be breaking the spirit of the no-ball law by "dragging". This was grounding the back foot behind the bowling crease, thus making the delivery legal, but dragging it through so that it was considerably in front of the crease before the front foot landed, illegally closer to the batsman. Following arguments over this the no-ball law was changed to rely on the bowler's front foot being grounded behind the popping crease, rather than the back foot being grounded behind the bowling crease, although the law still requires the back foot to land inside the marked pitch area. Elder statesmen on both sides, including Gubby Allen and Don Bradman, resolved to clear the air before Australia's tour of England in 1961. In 1963–64, Meckiff was called by Colin Egar in the First Test against South Africa in Brisbane, ending his career.

Twenty-one-year-old South African Geoff Griffin, who had already been called when playing for Natal, was called in May 1960 while playing against MCC at Lords and his test career was ended by umpire Frank Lee who called him four times during the Second Test. Remarkably he claimed a hat trick during the test but South Africa lost by an innings, prompting an exhibition match to be staged as the Queen was due to visit the ground. Griffin was called by umpire Syd Buller, ending an over bowling underarm when he was no-balled again for not informing the umpire of a change of action.

West Indian fast bowler Charlie Griffith, perhaps the most feared fast bowler of his generation, was often suspected of throwing his faster ball although he was not called in Test matches and the promising career of Derbyshire's Harold Rhodes was stunted by constant speculation about the legality of his action. He was 'called' while playing against the South African tourists in 1960 by Paul Gibb but though he was eventually cleared and played on with great success for Derbyshire through the decade, he played just twice for England.

=== 1990s ===
In more recent times bowlers such as England's James Kirtley, Australia's Brett Lee and Pakistan's Shoaib Akhtar and Shabbir Ahmed have come under scrutiny to varying degrees.

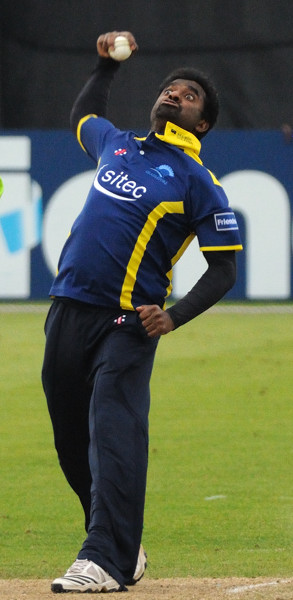
Muttiah Muralitharan's bowling action was a subject of controversy and debate for much of his career.

Muttiah Muralitharan, one of the modern era's most celebrated exponents of spin bowling was dogged by controversy over his bowling action for much of his international career. From his debut for Sri Lanka he was under scrutiny from umpires due to an unusual hyperextension of his congenitally bent arm during delivery. Despite initial criticism, the first occasion when his action became a real issue was when Australian umpire Darrell Hair called him for throwing during the Boxing Day Test in Melbourne, 1995. Hair publicly stated that he would not hesitate to call Murali for throwing again, given the opportunity and considered his bowling action "diabolical". The inability of cricket's officials to agree on the legality of Muralitharan's action and the reluctance of other umpires to call him for throwing meant Hair was isolated and was later excluded from officiating in matches involving Sri Lanka. Subsequent bio-mechanical tests exonerated Muralitharan's action, showing that he did not extend his arm any more than many other bowlers with legal actions. This testing never completely cleared his action in the eyes of his critics, who claim the extension of the arm differs between bowling in testing and bowling in games, and also when he bowls particular deliveries. During testing at the University of Western Australia several independent witnesses, including former cricketer Bruce Yardley, were present to ensure Muralitharan bowled as he would in match conditions.

Since the mid-1990s when Pakistani off-spinner Saqlain Mushtaq pioneered the doosra, off spinners who have bowled with a non-classical action that can produce this delivery have routinely been reported and investigated for throwing. Such bowlers include Harbhajan Singh, Shoaib Malik, Marlon Samuels, Mohammad Hafeez, Saeed Ajmal, Johan Botha, and Shane Shillingford. Saqlain is one of the few bowlers of the doosra whose action has never been called into question, although he was regularly no-balled for the more conventional sin of overstepping the crease.

== Biomechanics and modifications to the throwing laws ==
Testing conducted in the 1990s in England revealed that during a delivery virtually all bowlers flex and extend their arms naturally to some degree as it rotates around the shoulder. This testing revealed that the strict Laws of Cricket which banned any flexing of the arm were impossible to follow.

A set of tiered tolerance thresholds for the amount of allowable elbow extension, or straightening, were implemented: 10 degrees for fast bowlers, 7.5 degrees for medium pacers, and 5 degrees for spin bowlers. Enforcing these new measures proved problematic, as the laboratory based measurement systems used had a margin of error of at least 1 degree, and video based measurement systems were likely to have more, especially if inappropriately executed.

A later study from 2000 to 2003 showed that bowling actions that looked normal to the naked eye in many of the world's elite fast bowlers had, on average, 9 degrees of elbow extension during the bowling action. Some recorded elbow extension measuring between 10 and 15 degrees, yet none of these bowlers had ever had a problem regarding the legality of their bowling action. This testing showed that a zero tolerance threshold, and the tiered thresholds implemented in the late 1990s, had no or little scientific merit. The study, conducted by the Australian Institute of Sport Biomechanics department, led by cricket biomechanist Dr. Marc Portus, involved taking three-dimensional video based biomechanical analyses during tour, test and one-day international matches in Melbourne, Sydney and Brisbane. Results from this work indicated that video based measurement error in such a scenario, using best practice methodologies, was 3 degrees. This report was submitted to the ICC in 2003, which instigated the review of the illegal action definition and processes.

Subsequent to this the ICC received data from laboratory based analyses, on the basis that these measurement environments are more controlled, involving more sophisticated measurement technologies such as the Vicon Motion Analysis system. These were subject to less measurement error. Data was provided by the Australian Institute of Sport, the University of Western Australia and the Motion Analysis Corporation system from the University of Auckland. The ICC also carried out further video based three-dimensional analyses on all bowlers during the 2004 Champions Trophy in England. Regardless of the biomechanical measurement protocol used, a strikingly similar pattern emerged: the normal biomechanics of cricket bowling, whether it be spin or pace, features an element of elbow extension. The average extension of a normal, seemingly legal delivery was 8–10 degrees for all bowler types. There were virtually zero instances of no elbow extension at all in accordance with the original laws.

The ICC formed an expert panel comprising biomechanists Professor Bruce Elliott of The University of Western Australia, Dr Marc Portus of the Australian Institute of Sport and Dr Paul Hurrion from the UK who presented during a forum of a special ICC cricket sub-committee for illegal bowling actions in late 2003 in Dubai. The sub-committee was David Richardson, Angus Fraser, Aravinda De Silva, Michael Holding, Tony Lewis and Tim May. After this meeting the ICC decided to raise the elbow extension tolerance threshold to 15 degrees for all bowlers.

The new 15-degree limit was chosen after considering biomechanical findings from 130 pace and spin bowlers, the scientific issues with measurement, and that bowling actions considered to be "throw-like", or illegal, were usually measured to be well above 15 degrees of elbow extension, often in the 20 to 30-degree range.

== Process once a bowler is reported ==
If an umpire or match official deems that a bowler is contravening law 24.3, they detail this in the match report which is passed on the match referee. Within 24 hours of the conclusion of the match, the match referee provides the team manager and the ICC with a copy of the match report. A media statement is also issued that the player has been reported.

The first step in this process is an independent review of the player's bowling action which is carried out by a member of the ICC panel of human movement specialists, who will furnish the ICC with their report. If this report concludes that the player does have an illegal action, they are immediately suspended from all international cricket until they have remedied their action. If however, only a particular delivery is illegal, they can continue to bowl in international cricket provided they do not use the delivery in question until it has been remedied. Throughout the period of this independent assessment, the player can continue to bowl in international cricket.

If the player does not agree with the report, they can seek a hearing from a bowling review group made up of experts appointed by the ICC. This group will review evidence and decide, by a simple majority vote, on the legality of the player's action. If the player is cleared the suspension will be lifted immediately. A player who has been suspended from international cricket can continue to play domestic cricket under the supervision of his cricket Board. A player who has been suspended can at any time apply for a reassessment of their action. This usually happens after the player has completed a period of remedial work on their action. This reassessment is carried out in the same manner as the independent review. If the review concludes that the player has remedied their action the suspension will be lifted with immediate effect and they can start bowling in international cricket.

If the player is reported and suspended a second time within two years of his last report, he is automatically suspended for a period of one year before they can apply for a reassessment of their action. This event usually ends up effectively terminating a player's international career.

=== Intentional throwing ===
In general, although players with suspect actions now tend to be reported for investigations rather than suffering a public trial in front of spectators by being no-balled, umpires still have the right to call bowlers on the field if necessary. Such a case might occur when a bowler decides to deliberately and obviously throw the odd ball in a manner akin to a javelin throw as a surprise. Such cases have occurred throughout history of a bowler whose general action is not of concern but for whatever reason has appeared to deliberately throw a ball with a vastly different action. The Australian Test bowler Laurie Nash was once no-balled in such circumstances in the 1930s, with the journalists present opining that he had deliberately thrown the ball. The same was also true of David Gower (normally a batsman, and only a very occasional bowler) in the 1986 Eng/NZ Test at Trent Bridge: with New Zealand needing just one run to win with eight wickets in hand, rather than leaving the job of conceding the final run to a specialist bowler, Gower was brought on to bowl, and threw it with a fairly blatant illegal action (he normally bowled legally on the rare occasions that he bowled), conceding a no-ball for throwing. Martin Crowe smacked the ball to the boundary anyway, and the four runs were awarded (in those days, if runs were scored from the bat off a no-ball, these were considered to replace the normal penalty run for a no-ball: the law has subsequently changed so that the penalty run is additional to any runs scored), leaving Gower with an unusual bowling analysis of conceding 4 runs from, technically, zero deliveries.

== Hyperextension ==
In a report by scientists commissioned by the ICC it was shown that Pakistani bowler Shoaib Akhtar and Indian bowler R. P. Singh were seen to extend their elbow joints by a negative angle with respect to the upper arm. This phenomenon, also known as hyperextension, can give the illusion of throwing. In the report it was seen that R. P. Singh maintained this negative angle throughout his delivery stride, while Akhtar sometimes bowled a quicker delivery by flexing this hyperextension. These actions are not considered to be chucking as they are due to the distinctive architecture of their elbows, possibly a congenital condition. Since these cricketers have no control over this hyperextension, any degree of hyperextension (past zero) is not included in the 15-degree extension tolerance threshold.

== See also ==
- Bowling (cricket)
- Bowling action
- List of international cricketers called for throwing
