= Charles Fortune =

South African sports broadcaster (1904–1994)

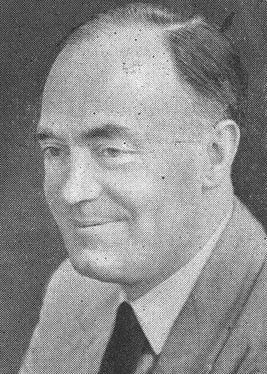
- Fortune in 1952
- Born: 31 December 1904; Lacock, Wiltshire, England
- Died: 22 November 1994 (aged 89); Johannesburg, South Africa
- Occupations: Broadcaster and cricket commentator

Charles Arthur Frederick Fortune (31 December 1904 – 22 November 1994) was a South African sport broadcaster and writer, especially noted for his cricket commentaries on radio.

== Early life ==
Born in Lacock, Wiltshire, Fortune gained a BSc at University College London and taught at Rutlish School in London before emigrating to South Africa in 1935, where he taught science for many years at St. Andrew's College, Grahamstown. He took up radio broadcasting in the late 1930s and continued until a stroke forced him to give up in the late 1980s.

== Broadcasting career ==
The South African cricket historian André Odendaal described Fortune as "the voice of cricket for generations of South African cricket enthusiasts". Fortune travelled to England, Australia and New Zealand when South African Test cricketers toured, joining the local radio commentary teams, and consequently attracting admirers from around the cricket world. Popular in Australia, he also travelled there to cover the English tours of 1954–55 and 1958–59.

He was famous for painting word pictures that conveyed what it was like to be at the ground, sometimes at the expense of the action on the field. The South African journalist Sue de Groot remembers, "Fortune spoke about the sky a lot, and the birds, and the trees, and sometimes a little about the cricket, and he did it all beautifully." His Australian counterpart, Alan McGilvray, said, "He would lose track of the game every so often, and he didn't often worry about such minor details as the score. But the words flowed from his mouth like a cascade of flowers, colourful and sweet-smelling and rich in warmth and character." Fortune had close friendships with McGilvray and John Arlott, his English radio counterpart.

McGilvray said Fortune's "patriotism and pride knew no bounds", and describes his excitement in the commentary box as the South Africans approached victory in the Fifth Test in 1966–67 and their first-ever series victory against Australia: "he burst into uncontrolled sobbing ... His body was shaking, as if in some sort of patriotic spasm." Eventually he was able to gather himself and broadcast the moment of victory.

Tony Lewis said of sharing a commentary box with Fortune on a visit to South Africa in 1987, "he let the odd ball pass by without mention, but there were three winners – the game of cricket, which he never compromised, the English language, which he adorned, and me, lucky to share a workplace with an educated mind and a master of words".

Speaking at a dinner held at the Melbourne Cricket Ground during the South African tour of Australia in 1963–64, Fortune explained why he mentioned seagulls and other extraneous matters while commentating. "Others could give a minute-by-minute score, he said, but he felt that it was up to him to try to tempt housewives to listen to cricket so that they could pass on their enthusiasm to their sons." He later said he broadcast during the early part of the day as if he were speaking to his wife, and later in the day as if he were speaking to his friends "who were coming home from work or the pub".

Fortune was the first person in the media to measure a batsman's progress in terms of balls faced rather than minutes at the crease. He and his scorer, John Landau, instituted this method when he broadcast the Tests during the 1956–57 England tour of South Africa. It is now standard practice.

Fortune was secretary of the South African Cricket Association (later the South African Cricket Union) for 12 years in the 1970s and 1980s.

In his later years Fortune and his wife Daphne (nee Walford) lived in a retirement village in the Johannesburg suburb of Rosebank. He died in Johannesburg in November 1994, survived by Daphne and their daughter.

== Memorials ==
The Charles Fortune Media Centre at the Wanderers Stadium in Johannesburg is named in his honour.

Apart from cricket he also broadcast rugby union, tennis and soccer. Some of his radio commentary of matches "played in Rugby's early years" can be heard at the South African Rugby Museum in Cape Town.

== Published works ==
- The MCC Tour of South Africa 1956–57. George G Harrap & Company Limited. 1957.
- Cricket Overthrown. Bailey & Swinfen. 1960.
- The Australians in England 1961. R. Hale. 1961.
- M.C.C. in South Africa, 1964-5. Robert Hale. 1965.
- Fortune, Charles; et al. (1989). Centenary of South Africa's Greatest Springbok Cricketers, 1889–1989. Goods Galore and South African Cricket Players' Association. ISBN 978-0-620-13536-8.
