= John Kierse =

Australian cricketer

Personal information
- Born: 11 January 1918; Nhill, Australia
- Died: 31 August 2006 (aged 88)
- Source: Cricinfo, 12 August 2020

John Kierse (11 January 1918 – 31 August 2006) was an Australian cricketer. He played in one first-class match for South Australia in 1939/40 in which he scored 23 runs and claimedone wicket.

== See also ==
- List of South Australian representative cricketers
