= Barry Gibbs (cricket) =

Australian cricket administrator

Barry Gibbs (11 March 1933 – 23 April 2006) was a South Australian cricket administrator.

Gibbs was the Chief Executive of the South Australian Cricket Association between 1988 and 1997. He was responsible for the opening of the Bradman Stand at Adelaide Oval. He died from cancer, aged 73.
