= Vincent Costello =

South African cricket umpire

Personal information
- Full name: Vincent Joseph Costello
- Born: 24 February 1906; Cape Town, South Africa
- Died: 22 April 1979 (aged 73); Cape Town, South Africa

Umpiring information
- Tests umpired: 6 (1957–1965)
- Source: Cricinfo, 5 July 2013

Vincent Costello (24 February 1906 – 22 April 1979) was a South African cricket umpire. Making his Test umpiring debut in 1957, he stood in six Test matches between 1957 and 1965.

== See also ==
- List of Test cricket umpires
