= Les Townsend =

Australian cricket umpire (1914–1986)

Leslie Hyde Townsend (born 4 October 1914 at Sydney, Australia; died 30 January 1986) was an Australian cricket Test match umpire.

He umpired one Test match between Australia and England at Melbourne on 13 February to 18 February 1959, won by Australia by 9 wickets with a century to Colin McDonald and 5 wickets each to Alan Davidson and Richie Benaud. Townsend's partner in this match was Ron Wright.

== See also ==
- Australian Test Cricket Umpires
- List of test umpires
