= James McMenamin =

Australian cricket umpire (1910–2000)

James McMenamin MC
Personal information
- Full name: James Hugh McMenamin
- Born: 26 May 1910; Paddington, New South Wales, Australia
- Died: 13 August 2000 (aged 90); Balgowlah, New South Wales, Australia
- Role: Umpire

Umpiring information
- Tests umpired: 4 (1956–1958)
- FC umpired: 10 (1956–1960)
- Source: CricketArchive, 13 February 2012
- Rugby league career

Playing information
- Position: Second-row, Prop, Hooker
Club
Years	Team	Pld	T	G	FG	P
1929–30	University	17	3	0	0	9
1931	Balmain	13	3	0	0	9
1932	Newtown	8	1	0	0	3
	Total	38	7	0	0	21
- Source: Whiticker/Hudson

James Hugh McMenamin MC (26 May 1910 – 13 August 2000) was a cricket umpire who officiated at Test level.

== Biography ==
McMenamin was born in Paddington, New South Wales in 1910. He died in Balgowlah, New South Wales in 2000.

While studying at the University of Sydney he played rugby league in the NSWRFL, for University, Balmain and Newtown.

During the Second World War McMenamin served in the South African Army in Europe. He was awarded a Military Cross for service in Italy.

== Umpiring ==
McMenamin umpired 10 first class cricket matches, including four Tests, between 1956 and 1960.
