= Wilhelm Marais =

South African cricket umpire

Personal information
- Born: 5 January 1908; Mossel Bay, South Africa
- Died: 24 September 1993 (aged 85); Midrand, South Africa

Umpiring information
- Tests umpired: 5 (1956–1958)
- Source: Cricinfo, 11 July 2013

Wilhelm Marais (5 January 1908 – 24 September 1993) was a South African cricketer and cricket umpire. He stood in five Test matches between 1956 and 1958.

== See also ==
- List of Test cricket umpires
