= List of Leeward Islands first-class cricketers =

The Leeward Islands cricket team is a composite cricket team representing the member associations of the Leeward Islands Cricket Association, which itself is a member association of the larger West Indies Cricket Board. The team incorporates players from several small islands in the Leeward Islands grouping of the Lesser Antilles, an island arc in the Caribbean Sea. These are Anguilla, Antigua and Barbuda, the British Virgin Islands, Montserrat, Nevis, Saint Kitts, Sint Maarten, and the United States Virgin Islands, although the sport is most popular in the islands that previously were part of the British Leeward Islands colony (in existence from 1833 to 1958). Although matches were played in the islands from the late 19th century, a combined team was not formed until the early 1950s, when semi-annual matches against a representative Windward Islands team commenced. The Leewards played its first match at first-class level in July 1958, against Jamaica.

For the inaugural 1965–66 season of the Shell Shield, the Leewards and Windwards associations together entered a "Combined Islands" team, an arrangement which persisted on and off until the 1981–82 season, when the associations began to enter separate teams. However, the Leewards still played regularly at first-class level during this time, against other West Indian domestic teams and touring international teams. Since its re-entry into the main domestic first-class competition, the team has played every season, winning the competition four times (as sole winner during the 1989–90, 1993–94, and 1995–96 seasons, and shared with Guyana during the 1997–98 season). In total, the Leewards have played 225 first-class matches, winning 72, drawing 81, losing 72, and having five matches abandoned. Of these, 187 matches were played in the main West Indian domestic competition. A total of 184 players have played at least one first-class match for the team since its debut.

== Key ==
Statistics:

- First – date of first match
- Last – date of last match
- M – number of matches played
- R – total runs scored in career
- HS – highest score
- * – denotes batsman was not out
- Avg – average runs scored per dismissal
- 100 – number of centuries in career
- 50 – number of half-centuries in career
- W – total wickets taken in career
- BB – best bowling figures in an innings
- Ave – average runs conceded per wicket
- 5i – number of five-wicket hauls in career
- 10m – number of ten-wicket hauls in career
- C – catches taken
- S – stumpings effected

Nationalities:

- Anguilla (10)
- Antigua and Barbuda (70)
- British Virgin Islands (3)
- Dominica (3)
- England (1)
- Guyana (4)
- Montserrat (23)
- Nevis (36)
- Saint Kitts (33)
- Saint Lucia (1)
- Saint Vincent and the Grenadines (1)
- Sint Maarten (3)
- Trinidad and Tobago (1)
- United States Virgin Islands (2)
- Note: where players have strong ties to multiple countries, both nationalities are listed. For seven players during the early years of the team, information on place of birth and/or nationality is lacking. These players are denoted.

== List of players ==
Statistics only include first-class matches played for the Leeward Islands, and are correct as of 7 June 2013.

№	Name	Nat	First	Last	M	R	HS	Avg	100	50	W	BB	Ave	5i	10m	C	S	Ref
1	Len Harris	(Saint Kitts)	5 July 1958	25 Feb. 1971	13	766	105	34.81	1	9	6	4/42	19.33	0	0	7	0	
2	Oscar Williams	(Antigua and Barbuda)	5 July 1958	25 Feb. 1960	2	191	100	63.66	1	1	0	0/8	–	0	0	1	0	
3	Kingsley Rock	(Montserrat)	5 July 1958	25 Feb. 1960	2	54	28	13.50	0	0	0	0/13	–	0	0	0	0	
4	Bertram Ross		5 July 1958	5 July 1958	1	0	0	0.00	0	0	–	–	–	–	–	0	0	
5	C. Rogers		5 July 1958	5 July 1958	1	30	26	15.00	0	0	1	1/22	22.00	0	0	0	0	
6	Rupert Scotland	(Antigua and Barbuda)	5 July 1958	5 July 1958	1	113	72	56.50	0	1	–	–	–	–	–	0	0	
7	Fred Hobson		5 July 1958	5 July 1958	1	23	19	11.50	0	0	2	2/142	71.00	0	0	2	0	
8	Eustace Matthew	(Antigua and Barbuda)	5 July 1958	25 Feb. 1960	2	52	33	26.00	0	0	4	2/94	54.25	0	0	1	0	
9	David Parry	(Nevis)	5 July 1958	5 July 1958	1	0	0	0.00	0	0	0	0/55	–	0	0	0	0	
10	R. Buchanan		5 July 1958	25 Feb. 1960	2	1	1*	0.50	0	0	–	–	–	–	–	1	1	
11	Hubert Anthonyson	(Antigua and Barbuda)	5 July 1958	25 Feb. 1960	2	13	10	4.33	0	0	0	0/71	–	0	0	1	0	
12	Patrick Evanson	(Antigua and Barbuda)	25 Feb. 1960	25 Feb. 1960	1	53	45	26.50	0	0	–	–	–	–	–	0	0	
13	Franklyn Edwards	(Montserrat)	25 Feb. 1960	12 Mar. 1965	2	17	10	4.25	0	0	0	0/1	–	0	0	0	0	
14	Deryck Michael	(Antigua and Barbuda)	25 Feb. 1960	16 Jan. 1970	3	140	64	28.00	0	2	0	0/19	–	0	0	1	0	
15	Hubert Turner	(Antigua and Barbuda)	25 Feb. 1960	25 Feb. 1960	1	35	35	35.00	0	0	1	1/67	67.00	0	0	0	0	
16	Adolphus Freeland	(Antigua and Barbuda)	25 Feb. 1960	27 Mar. 1967	5	17	7*	5.66	0	0	22	5/38	21.59	2	0	2	0	
17	Veron Edwards	(Antigua and Barbuda)	12 Mar. 1965	28 July 1973	5	118	75	16.85	0	1	0	0/18	–	0	0	3	0	
18	Hesketh Benjamin	(Saint Kitts)	12 Mar. 1965	12 Feb. 1969	8	202	47	13.46	0	0	–	–	–	–	–	3	0	
19	Hilson Phillip	(Antigua and Barbuda)	12 Mar. 1965	16 Jan. 1970	9	356	68	23.73	0	2	–	–	–	–	–	4	0	
20	Harold Walters	(Nevis)	12 Mar. 1965	27 Mar. 1967	5	65	18*	10.83	0	0	5	4/72	50.20	0	0	4	0	
21	Clement Hicks	(Saint Kitts)	12 Mar. 1965	12 Feb. 1969	7	234	40	19.50	0	0	11	3/26	35.00	0	0	4	0	
22	Melford Roach	(Montserrat)	12 Mar. 1965	12 Mar. 1965	1	36	34	18.00	0	0	0	0/66	–	0	0	1	0	
23	Auckland Hector	(Saint Kitts)	12 Mar. 1965	8 Mar. 1975	20	581	58*	19.36	0	3	–	–	–	–	–	34	17	
24	Edgar Gilbert	(Saint Kitts)	12 Mar. 1965	15 Feb. 1968	6	359	84	44.87	0	4	19	5/90	34.68	1	0	3	0	
25	Leroy Coury	(Saint Kitts)	12 Mar. 1965	16 Jan. 1970	7	59	15*	5.90	0	0	11	3/72	56.36	0	0	0	0	
26	K. Matthew		25 Nov. 1965	25 Nov. 1965	1	14	14	7.00	0	0	1	1/16	16.00	0	0	0	0	
27	Theodore Hobson	(Nevis)	25 Nov. 1965	25 Nov. 1965	1	10	10	10.00	0	0	–	–	–	–	–	0	0	
28	Clement Francis	(Antigua and Barbuda)	25 Nov. 1965	9 Feb. 1967	2	8	6	2.66	0	0	2	1/32	51.50	0	0	0	0	
29	Lionel Thomas	(Saint Kitts)	9 Feb. 1967	15 Feb. 1968	4	218	77	31.14	0	1	4	2/68	25.50	0	0	1	0	
30	William Duberry	(Montserrat)	9 Feb. 1967	28 July 1973	3	26	13*	6.50	0	0	2	2/41	80.50	0	0	2	0	
31	Cecil Martin	(Antigua and Barbuda)	16 Mar. 1967	16 Jan. 1970	2	49	42	12.25	0	0	–	–	–	–	–	1	0	
32	Vendol Moore	(Montserrat)	27 Mar. 1967	24 Feb. 1973	2	25	9	8.33	0	0	0	0/7	–	0	0	0	0	
33	Livingstone Sargeant	(Nevis)	15 Feb. 1968	2 Feb. 1977	18	964	127	38.56	2	7	1	1/5	15.00	0	0	16	0	
34	Kirton Thomas	(Antigua and Barbuda)	15 Feb. 1968	15 Feb. 1968	1	9	5	4.50	0	0	–	–	–	–	–	0	0	
35	Vance Amory	(Nevis)	17 Jan. 1969	21 Mar. 1981	17	747	88	27.66	0	4	1	1/0	21.00	0	0	18	0	
36	Edward Arthurton	(Nevis)	17 Jan. 1969	25 Feb. 1971	4	102	45*	17.00	0	0	10	3/35	28.20	0	0	1	0	
37	Donald Richards	(Antigua and Barbuda)	17 Jan. 1969	14 Mar. 1970	3	102	57	17.00	0	1	10	4/85	21.60	0	0	2	0	
38	Jeffers Warrington	(Dominica)	17 Jan. 1969	25 Feb. 1971	5	79	22	11.28	0	0	20	5/26	15.85	1	0	0	0	
39	George Allen	(Montserrat)	16 Jan. 1970	24 Feb. 1973	6	179	53	25.57	0	1	10	3/37	25.20	0	0	5	0	
40	Andy Roberts	(Antigua and Barbuda)	16 Jan. 1970	23 Feb. 1984	25	347	54	11.96	0	1	104	8/62	18.94	6	2	8	0	
41	Guy Yearwood	(Antigua and Barbuda)	14 Jan. 1971	8 Mar. 1975	5	232	100	25.77	1	0	0	0/22	–	0	0	4	0	
42	Alfonso Rouse	(Saint Kitts)	14 Jan. 1971	25 Feb. 1971	2	20	13	6.66	0	0	–	–	–	–	–	0	0	
43	Lennox Cooper	(Montserrat)	14 Jan. 1971	14 Jan. 1971	1	3	3*	–	0	0	1	1/32	47.00	0	0	1	0	
44	Elquemedo Willett	(Nevis)	14 Jan. 1971	10 Feb. 1989	41	398	40	12.83	0	0	151	6/47	23.90	6	2	26	0	
45	Leonard Williams	(Saint Kitts)	25 Feb. 1971	23 Sep. 1972	3	109	41	21.80	0	0	2	1/14	36.50	0	0	1	0	
46	Eversley Barrett	(Nevis)	25 Feb. 1971	25 Feb. 1971	1	32	22	16.00	0	0	–	–	–	–	–	0	0	
47	Sylvester Greenaway	(Montserrat)	15 Jan. 1972	25 Feb. 1972	2	15	11	3.75	0	0	–	–	–	–	–	2	0	
48	Jim Allen	(Montserrat)	15 Jan. 1972	3 Mar. 1983	25	1369	104	33.39	1	10	1	1/21	40.00	0	0	15	1	
49	Gene Gould	(Antigua and Barbuda)	15 Jan. 1972	8 Mar. 1975	4	78	20	13.00	0	0	7	3/67	28.42	0	0	4	0	
50	Everod Carter	(Antigua and Barbuda)	15 Jan. 1972	8 Mar. 1975	3	10	6	5.00	0	0	5	3/65	33.60	0	0	1	0	
51	Viv Richards	(Antigua and Barbuda)	25 Feb. 1972	1 Feb. 1991	28	1669	167	45.10	4	9	29	4/55	34.68	0	0	36	0	
52	E. Braithwaite		19 Sep. 1972	19 Sep. 1972	1	11	6	5.50	0	0	–	–	–	–	–	1	0	
53	Alford Corriette	(Montserrat)	19 Sep. 1972	1 Mar. 1976	9	412	81	29.42	0	4	19	4/41	27.78	0	0	2	0	
54	Hugh Gore	(Antigua and Barbuda)	23 Sep. 1972	7 Mar. 1979	12	113	20	8.69	0	0	18	3/28	32.00	0	0	5	0	
55	Victor Eddy	(Saint Kitts)	28 July 1973	5 Feb. 1988	31	1909	139	41.50	3	10	31	5/40	29.64	1	0	17	0	
56	Charles Wilkin	(Saint Kitts)	28 July 1973	2 Feb. 1977	6	132	26	22.00	0	0	10	3/99	51.50	0	0	1	0	
57	Leon Stevens	(Antigua and Barbuda)	28 July 1973	8 Mar. 1975	3	59	42	14.75	0	0	8	3/33	41.12	0	0	4	0	
58	Mervin Richards	(Antigua and Barbuda)	23 Feb. 1974	23 Feb. 1974	1	42	30	21.00	0	0	0	0/5	–	0	0	1	0	
59	Michael Camacho	(Antigua and Barbuda)	3 Mar. 1975	7 Mar. 1979	12	791	103	41.63	2	2	0	0/12	–	0	0	9	0	
60	E. Broadbelt		3 Mar. 1975	3 Mar. 1975	1	16	12	6.00	0	0	–	–	–	–	–	1	0	
61	Luther Kelly	(Saint Kitts)	5 Jan. 1976	8 Feb. 1990	41	2143	88	29.35	0	14	0	0/1	–	0	0	39	0	
62	Enoch Lewis	(Antigua and Barbuda)	5 Jan. 1976	12 Feb. 1986	28	1574	158	32.12	4	4	0	0/0	–	0	0	10	0	
63	Derick Parry	(Nevis)	5 Jan. 1976	2 Apr. 1982	12	393	85	20.68	0	1	39	5/57	33.56	1	0	12	0	
64	Winston Williams	(Saint Kitts)	5 Jan. 1976	17 Feb. 1978	5	39	15	5.57	0	0	–	–	–	–	–	3	3	
65	Lipton Griffin	(Nevis)	5 Jan. 1976	4 Jan. 1977	3	16	10	8.00	0	0	7	3/43	18.57	0	0	0	0	
66	Taddy Arrindell	(Antigua and Barbuda)	4 Jan. 1977	2 Feb. 1977	3	97	51	24.25	0	1	–	–	–	–	–	6	1	
67	Olson Paul	(Antigua and Barbuda)	8 Jan. 1977	8 Jan. 1977	1	1	1*	–	0	0	3	3/30	20.33	0	0	0	0	
68	Ulysses Lawrence	(Antigua and Barbuda)	10 Jan. 1978	8 Feb. 1985	9	310	49	19.37	0	0	18	4/51	27.72	0	0	7	0	
69	John Archibald	(Antigua and Barbuda)	10 Jan. 1978	21 Mar. 1981	4	120	41	17.14	0	0	2	1/23	82.00	0	0	3	0	
70	Oris Fergus	(Montserrat)	10 Jan. 1978	14 Jan. 1978	2	25	17*	12.50	0	0	3	2/20	20.33	0	0	1	0	
71	James Harris	(Saint Kitts)	10 Jan. 1978	18 Feb. 1984	11	149	31*	11.46	0	0	21	4/74	43.14	0	0	3	0	
72	Stephen Liburd	(Saint Kitts)	14 Jan. 1978	22 Apr. 1983	4	211	48*	30.14	0	0	0	0/5	–	0	0	0	0	
73	Everette Sargeant	(Nevis)	2 Mar. 1979	22 Apr. 1983	5	143	29	15.88	0	0	–	–	–	–	–	11	4	
74	Austin White	(Montserrat)	7 Mar. 1979	22 Apr. 1983	5	78	19	8.66	0	0	5	2/63	73.40	0	0	2	0	
75	Earl Rawlins	(Nevis)	10 Mar. 1980	10 Mar. 1980	1	24	17	12.00	0	0	–	–	–	–	–	1	0	
76	Ralston Otto	(Antigua and Barbuda)	10 Mar. 1980	8 Feb. 1990	42	2309	165	33.95	6	10	2	2/17	77.50	0	0	40	0	
77	Shirlon Williams	(Saint Kitts)	2 Mar. 1979	12 Feb. 1986	24	1021	127	28.36	2	4	–	–	–	–	–	42	9	
78	Raphael Wallace	(Nevis)	10 Mar. 1980	10 Mar. 1980	1	6	6*	–	0	0	2	2/33	25.00	0	0	0	0	
79	Haycene Ryan	(Montserrat)	12 Jan. 1981	21 Mar. 1981	2	19	13*	6.33	0	0	1	1/16	24.00	0	0	2	0	
80	Noel Guishard	(Saint Kitts)	12 Jan. 1981	22 Feb. 1992	51	1501	85	23.09	0	7	132	6/33	30.06	5	0	32	0	
81	Virgil Newton	(Saint Kitts)	12 Jan. 1981	22 Apr. 1983	3	24	9	4.80	0	0	4	2/45	49.75	0	0	1	0	
82	Eldine Baptiste	(Antigua and Barbuda)	4 Mar. 1982	1 Feb. 1991	37	1324	99	25.46	0	7	132	6/26	22.44	5	1	24	0	
83	Richie Richardson	(Antigua and Barbuda)	20 Mar. 1982	26 Jan. 1996	41	2894	176	45.21	10	10	5	5/40	17.80	1	0	36	0	
84	George Ferris	(Antigua and Barbuda)	21 Jan. 1983	17 Feb. 1989	17	178	26	22.25	0	0	36	4/68	27.50	0	0	2	0	
85	Tony Merrick	(Antigua and Barbuda)	11 Feb. 1983	3 Feb. 1989	22	411	62*	15.80	0	1	65	5/54	29.36	4	0	12	0	
86	Livingstone Lawrence	(Nevis)	21 Jan. 1984	10 Feb. 1994	24	1698	118	29.78	2	9	1	1/10	84.00	0	0	19	0	
87	Shane Julien	(Grenada)	21 Jan. 1984	23 Feb. 1984	6	271	123	27.10	1	1	–	–	–	–	–	4	0	
88	Fitzroy Buffonge	(Montserrat)	28 Jan. 1984	24 Jan. 1992	4	107	24	15.28	0	0	–	–	–	–	–	2	0	
89	James Thompson	(Nevis)	11 Feb. 1984	25 Feb. 1989	9	66	26	9.42	0	0	14	4/94	40.64	0	0	4	0	
90	Conrad Bartlette	(Nevis)	1 Feb. 1985	16 Feb. 1985	3	16	9	4.00	0	0	5	4/69	34.60	0	0	3	0	
91	Edward Lewis	(Antigua and Barbuda)	16 Feb. 1985	1 Mar. 1985	3	135	48	27.00	0	0	–	–	–	–	–	3	0	
92	Winston Benjamin	(Antigua and Barbuda)	16 Jan. 1986	10 Feb. 1994	29	755	85	20.97	0	2	102	7/64	22.68	5	1	10	0	
93	Keith Arthurton	(Nevis)	24 Jan. 1986	25 Feb. 2000	52	3406	154	45.41	6	24	16	2/3	33.87	0	0	29	0	
94	McChesney Simon	(Antigua and Barbuda)	31 Jan. 1986	14 Feb. 1992	8	126	43	10.50	0	0	1	1/0	0.00	0	0	24	4	
95	Eustace Proctor	(Anguilla)	12 Feb. 1986	12 Feb. 1986	1	2	2	2.00	0	0	5	4/46	17.00	0	0	0	0	
96	Curtly Ambrose	(Antigua and Barbuda)	12 Feb. 1986	25 Feb. 2000	37	517	49	12.60	0	0	163	7/66	15.98	7	1	23	0	
97	Livingstone Harris	(Saint Kitts)	22 Jan. 1988	5 Mar. 1993	30	1277	98	31.92	0	11	–	–	–	–	–	62	2	
98	Hayden Walsh, Sr.	(Antigua and Barbuda)	5 Feb. 1988	5 Mar. 1993	18	851	92	28.36	0	5	0	0/4	–	0	0	14	0	
99	Stuart Williams	(Nevis)	26 Jan. 1989	18 Mar. 2005	90	6598	252*	47.12	20	25	2	1/19	54.50	0	0	75	0	
100	Kenny Benjamin	(Antigua and Barbuda)	26 Jan. 1989	12 Feb. 1999	38	479	52*	12.60	0	1	136	7/51	22.80	5	0	8	0	
101	Lanville Harrigan	(Anguilla)	17 Feb. 1989	5 Mar. 1998	29	1075	67	21.93	0	6	–	–	–	–	–	17	0	
102	Hamish Anthony	(Antigua and Barbuda)	12 Jan. 1990	10 Apr. 1997	36	929	82	18.58	0	5	114	6/22	26.14	3	0	12	0	
103	Recaldo Bassue	(Saint Kitts)	19 Jan. 1990	2 Feb. 1990	2	89	57	22.25	0	1	–	–	–	–	–	0	0	
104	Dave Joseph	(Antigua and Barbuda)	18 Jan. 1991	15 Feb. 2002	46	2097	131	30.83	6	11	–	–	–	–	–	45	0	
105	Warrington Phillip	(Nevis)	26 Jan. 1991	25 Feb. 2000	42	632	45	14.36	0	0	147	8/92	25.44	10	3	38	0	
106	Ridley Jacobs	(Antigua and Barbuda)	24 Jan. 1992	18 Mar. 2005	66	3492	140	43.11	9	20	–	–	–	–	–	197	14	
107	Roy Marshall	(Dominica)	31 Jan. 1992	14 Feb. 1992	3	45	25	9.00	0	0	6	2/15	30.83	0	0	1	0	
108	Winston Davis	(Saint Kitts)	7 Feb. 1992	19 Feb. 1993	5	252	99	28.00	0	1	2	2/47	42.50	0	0	2	0	
109	Vaughn Walsh	(Antigua and Barbuda)	7 Feb. 1992	3 Feb. 1994	13	106	22	8.83	0	0	42	6/77	27.66	0	0	5	0	
110	Percy Daniel	(Saint Kitts)	22 Feb. 1992	22 Feb. 1992	1	29	29	29.00	0	0	–	–	–	–	–	3	0	
111	John Maynard	(Nevis)	22 Feb. 1992	12 Feb. 1999	13	79	19*	6.58	0	0	35	5/24	25.11	1	0	4	0	
112	Lennie Lake	(Saint Kitts)	26 Feb. 1993	7 Jan. 1994	2	29	18	9.66	0	0	7	4/99	23.71	0	0	2	0	
113	Clifford Walwyn	(Nevis)	7 Jan. 1994	20 Jan. 1995	7	300	80	27.27	0	2	–	–	–	–	–	2	0	
114	Lesroy Weekes	(Montserrat)	21 Jan. 1994	10 Apr. 1997	20	423	46	16.92	0	0	55	5/83	27.81	1	0	14	0	
115	Harwood Williams	(Saint Kitts)	3 Feb. 1994	23 Feb. 1996	3	63	25	12.60	0	0	–	–	–	–	–	2	0	
116	Merlin Liburd	(Nevis)	6 Jan. 1995	5 Feb. 1999	12	434	77	22.84	0	1	–	–	–	–	–	15	0	
117	Kenneth Quinn	(Antigua and Barbuda)	6 Jan. 1995	12 Feb. 1999	15	73	17*	6.63	0	0	40	5/38	25.07	1	0	4	0	
118	Jenson Joseph	(Antigua and Barbuda)	6 Jan. 1995	24 Jan. 1997	11	218	44	14.53	0	0	39	5/59	25.66	1	0	11	0	
119	Carl Tuckett	(Nevis)	27 Jan. 1995	19 Feb. 2004	36	1468	142	30.58	1	8	55	4/16	21.23	0	0	13	0	
120	Junie Mitchum	(Saint Kitts)	3 Feb. 1995	18 Mar. 2005	31	1366	89	26.78	0	10	2	1/14	31.50	0	0	18	0	
121	Colin Cannonier	(Saint Kitts)	26 Jan. 1996	9 Feb. 2001	11	311	41*	16.36	0	0	0	0/0	–	0	0	14	0	
122	Ronald Powell	(Nevis)	24 Jan. 1997	16 Jan. 1998	10	292	51	20.85	0	1	29	3/31	29.72	0	0	6	0	
123	Sylvester Joseph	(Antigua and Barbuda)	24 Jan. 1997	10 Apr. 2013	66	3298	211*	30.25	4	16	4	2/13	25.50	0	0	65	0	
124	Lesroy Irish	(Montserrat)	9 May 1997	5 Mar. 1998	5	3	2	0.75	0	0	13	2/14	26.76	0	0	5	0	
125	Alex Adams	(Anguilla)	16 May 1997	12 Feb. 2004	39	1921	103*	29.10	1	13	14	2/25	36.64	0	0	47	0	
126	Earl Waldron	(Antigua and Barbuda)	23 May 1997	22 Jan. 1999	3	75	43	15.00	0	0	2	1/63	72.50	0	0	5	0	
127	Runako Morton	(Nevis)	23 May 1997	11 Mar. 2011	58	4104	231	44.60	11	25	3	3/17	48.66	0	0	65	0	
128	Michael Mills	(Nevis)	23 May 1997	8 June 1997	2	4	2	1.33	0	0	10	5/33	13.80	1	0	1	0	
129	Angelo Bass	(Montserrat)	8 June 1997	8 June 1997	1	0	0	0.00	0	0	1	1/59	139.00	0	0	0	0	
130	Anthony Lake	(Antigua and Barbuda)	5 Mar. 1998	8 Mar. 2002	11	78	25	4.58	0	0	29	4/50	28.93	0	0	11	0	
131	Wilden Cornwall	(Antigua and Barbuda)	15 Jan. 1999	26 Feb. 2010	53	1959	111	23.89	3	7	106	6/53	30.66	4	0	29	0	
132	Jason Williams	(Saint Kitts)	15 Jan. 1999	5 Feb. 2007	17	351	42	14.04	0	0	–	–	–	–	–	37	4	
133	Kerry Jeremy	(Antigua and Barbuda)	29 Jan. 1999	28 Jan. 2007	46	370	70*	9.02	0	1	156	6/33	24.03	9	0	23	0	
134	Joel Simmonds	(Nevis)	6 Jan. 2000	7 Feb. 2003	12	178	54	10.47	0	2	–	–	–	–	–	23	3	
135	Ricky Christopher	(Antigua and Barbuda)	28 Jan. 2000	8 Feb. 2002	11	49	12	7.00	0	0	40	5/32	24.92	2	0	3	0	
136	Goldwyn Prince	(Antigua and Barbuda)	4 Feb. 2000	8 Mar. 2002	10	52	13	5.20	0	0	33	5/96	31.39	1	0	2	0	
137	Omari Banks	(Anguilla)	4 Jan. 2001	18 Feb. 2011	56	2029	108	26.01	2	13	150	7/41	34.84	8	2	35	0	
138	Davon Williams	(Montserrat)	19 Jan. 2001	9 Feb. 2001	3	138	48	27.60	0	0	0	0/11	–	0	0	1	0	
139	Adam Sanford	(Dominica)	25 Jan. 2002	29 Feb. 2008	42	324	37	7.71	0	0	155	7/40	28.96	4	2	18	0	
140	Ian Tittle	(Antigua and Barbuda)	8 Feb. 2002	19 Feb. 2004	13	538	101*	29.88	1	3	1	1/37	136.00	0	0	15	0	
141	Tonito Willett	(Nevis)	5 Jan. 2001	30 Mar. 2013	60	2423	93	25.23	0	16	77	5/31	31.98	2	0	22	0	
142	Carl Simon	(Antigua and Barbuda)	31 Jan. 2003	12 Jan. 2007	23	322	37	12.38	0	0	60	5/48	30.96	1	0	9	0	
143	Gareth Matthew	(Saint Kitts)	14 Feb. 2003	7 Mar. 2003	4	33	14	6.60	0	0	–	–	–	–	–	10	0	
144	Chaka Hodge	(Anguilla)	13 Feb. 2003	29 Feb. 2008	8	134	46	11.16	0	0	18	5/103	39.27	1	0	0	0	
145	Gavin Tonge	(Antigua and Barbuda)	28 Feb. 2003	6 Mar. 2013	40	781	73	12.59	0	3	125	7/58	25.99	6	0	18	0	
146	Shane Jeffers	(Saint Kitts)	9 Jan. 2004	10 Feb. 2012	37	1698	128	27.38	2	10	2	2/30	38.50	0	0	31	0	
147	Virgil Browne	(Nevis)	9 Jan. 2004	12 Feb. 2004	6	104	33	17.33	0	0	20	8/129	31.75	1	1	2	0	
148	Dane Weston	(Antigua and Barbuda)	9 Jan. 2004	19 Feb. 2004	2	1	1*	1.00	0	0	4	2/17	40.75	0	0	1	0	
149	Elsroy Powell	(Saint Kitts)	16 Jan. 2004	29 Jan. 2010	3	79	61*	19.75	0	1	3	3/138	70.00	0	0	1	0	
150	Codville Rogers	(Nevis)	19 Feb. 2004	29 Jan. 2010	9	286	49	19.06	0	0	–	–	–	–	–	6	0	
151	Brian Stephney	(Guyana) (Montserrat)	11 Feb. 2004	18 Feb. 2005	2	4	2*	–	0	0	1	1/95	105.00	0	0	0	0	
152	Lionel Baker	(Montserrat)	4 Mar. 2005	9 Feb. 2013	24	351	37	10.96	0	0	67	8/31	25.22	3	1	12	0	
153	Austin Richards	(Antigua and Barbuda)	25 Nov. 2005	27 Feb. 2013	16	855	183	28.50	1	3	0	0/6	–	0	0	7	0	
154	Alderman Lesmond	(Saint Lucia) (United States Virgin Islands)	25 Nov. 2005	27 Jan. 2006	4	38	13*	7.60	0	0	–	–	–	–	–	6	0	
155	Steve Liburd	(Saint Kitts)	13 Jan. 2006	23 Mar. 2013	35	1206	116*	20.79	1	4	10	3/46	31.50	0	0	47	1	
156	Colin Hamer	(Guyana) (Sint Maarten)	27 Jan. 2006	27 Jan. 2006	1	1	1*	1.00	0	0	3	2/29	33.00	0	0	0	0	
157	Javier Liburd	(Nevis)	12 Jan. 2007	23 Mar. 2012	10	324	50	19.05	0	1	–	–	–	–	–	4	0	
158	Justin Athanaze	(Antigua and Barbuda)	12 Jan. 2007	30 Mar. 2013	24	460	42*	11.79	0	0	53	5/58	33.15	1	0	16	0	
159	Maxford Pipe	(British Virgin Islands)	28 Jan. 2007	4 Jan. 2008	2	57	33	14.25	0	0	–	–	–	–	–	1	0	
160	Montcin Hodge	(Anguilla)	4 Jan. 2008	23 Mar. 2013	30	1141	78	22.82	0	9	0	0/7	–	0	0	17	0	
161	Devon Thomas	(Antigua and Barbuda)	4 Jan. 2008	10 Apr. 2013	27	971	74	21.10	0	3	0	0/22	–	0	0	65	1	
162	Anthony Martin	(Antigua and Barbuda)	4 Jan. 2008	30 Mar. 2013	39	252	42	6.30	0	0	118	7/81	28.36	4	1	23	0	
163	Bront DeFreitas	(Saint Vincent and the Grenadines) (British Virgin Islands)	18 Jan. 2008	26 Feb. 2010	9	62	19	6.88	0	0	18	5/88	31.44	1	0	2	0	
164	Jahmar Hamilton	(Anguilla)	29 Feb. 2008	10 Apr. 2013	21	934	100	23.94	1	5	–	–	–	–	–	40	2	
165	Orlando Peters	(Antigua and Barbuda)	14 Mar. 2008	6 Mar. 2013	9	182	45	10.11	0	0	2	1/3	20.00	0	0	5	0	
166	Kieran Powell	(Nevis)	28 Mar. 2008	10 Apr. 2013	26	1541	131	34.24	1	9	0	0/2	–	0	0	13	0	
167	Tarrick Prince	(Antigua and Barbuda)	30 Jan. 2009	30 Jan. 2009	1	2	2*	2.00	0	0	1	1/25	43.00	0	0	2	0	
168	Akito Willett	(Nevis)	30 Jan. 2009	27 Feb. 2009	2	13	8	3.25	0	0	1	1/40	73.00	0	0	4	0	
169	Robbie Joseph	(Antigua and Barbuda)	6 Feb. 2009	13 Feb. 2009	2	43	33	14.33	0	0	4	2/26	46.75	0	0	0	0	
170	Mali Richards	(England) (Antigua and Barbuda)	29 Jan. 2010	26 Feb. 2010	3	49	20	9.80	0	0	–	–	–	–	–	3	0	
171	Gavin Williams	(Antigua and Barbuda)	12 Feb. 2010	23 Mar. 2012	13	402	114	16.08	1	0	–	–	–	–	–	13	0	
172	Daynason Browne	(Nevis)	19 Feb. 2010	19 Feb. 2010	1	7	6	3.50	0	0	0	0/11	–	0	0	10	0	
173	Shane Burton	(Antigua and Barbuda)	4 Feb. 2011	10 Apr. 2013	5	132	40	13.20	0	0	2	2/32	44.00	0	0	2	0	
174	Dolston Tuit	(Montserrat)	25 Feb. 2011	25 Feb. 2011	1	21	17	10.50	0	0	–	–	–	–	–	0	0	
175	Jacques Taylor	(Saint Kitts)	25 Feb. 2011	23 Mar. 2012	4	142	63	28.40	0	1	2	2/50	133.00	0	0	2	0	
176	Sherwin Peters	(Trinidad and Tobago) (Sint Maarten)	11 Mar. 2011	10 Apr. 2013	4	109	57	13.62	0	1	5	3/19	12.40	0	0	2	0	
177	Jaison Peters	(Guyana) (Montserrat)	11 Mar. 2011	16 Mar. 2012	4	89	33	14.83	0	0	–	–	–	–	–	2	0	
178	Kerry Mentore	(Antigua and Barbuda)	18 Mar. 2011	18 Mar. 2011	1	7	7	3.50	0	0	0	0/8	–	0	0	1	0	
179	Kelbert Walters	(Anguilla)	18 Mar. 2011	30 Mar. 2013	3	55	28*	13.75	0	0	8	3/64	25.50	0	0	1	0	
180	Juari Edwards	(Antigua and Barbuda)	25 Mar. 2011	25 Mar. 2011	1	10	10	5.00	0	0	–	–	–	–	–	0	0	
181	Moreland le Blanc	(Sint Maarten)	25 Mar. 2011	25 Mar. 2011	1	13	11	6.50	0	0	0	0/1	–	0	0	0	0	
182	Nelson Bolan	(British Virgin Islands) (Nevis)	3 Feb. 2012	10 Apr. 2013	4	25	6*	4.16	0	0	7	4/43	31.00	0	0	3	0	
183	Jason Campbell	(Nevis)	16 Feb. 2012	16 Feb. 2012	1	3	3	1.50	0	0	1	1/72	72.00	0	0	1	0	
184	Hayden Walsh, Jr.	(United States Virgin Islands) (Antigua and Barbuda)	9 Mar. 2012	10 Apr. 2013	6	40	38	11.66	0	0	12	4/47	34.16	0	0	4	0	
185	Larry Joseph	(Antigua and Barbuda)	9 Feb. 2013	6 Mar. 2013	3	49	13	8.16	0	0	7	4/66	33.28	0	0	2	0	
186	Quinton Boatswain	(Montserrat)	27 Feb. 2013	10 Apr. 2013	3	7	3*	2.33	0	0	9	4/82	29.22	0	0	3	0	
187	Akeem Saunders	(Saint Kitts)	6 Mar. 2013	10 Apr. 2013	1	60	21*	20.00	0	0	–	–	–	–	–	1	0	
188	Lyndel Richardson	(Anguilla)	23 Mar. 2013	30 Mar. 2013	2	12	12	3.00	0	0	–	–	–	–	–	1	0	
189	Yannick Leonard	(Guyana) (Anguilla)	10 Apr. 2013	10 Apr. 2013	1	8	8	8.00	0	0	5	4/63	13.80	0	0	0	0	

== List of captains ==
Twenty-eight players have captained the Leewards in at least one first-class match, with Nevisian Stuart Williams' 38 matches between 1994 and 2004 the most of any one player. Of the team's captains, two were Anguillan, nine Antiguan, one Montserratian, seven Nevisian, eight Kittitian, and one of unknown nationality:

№	Name	Nat	First	Last	M	W	D	L	T	Win%	Ref
1	Bertram Ross		5 July 1958	5 July 1958	1	0	0	1	0	0.00%	
2	Hubert Anthonyson	(Antigua and Barbuda)	25 February 1960	25 February 1960	1	0	1	0	0	0.00%	
3	Theodore Hobson	(Nevis)	25 November 1965	25 November 1965	1	0	1	0	0	0.00%	
4	Len Harris	(Saint Kitts)	9 February 1967	25 February 1971	9	2	3	4	0	22.22%	
5	Auckland Hector	(Saint Kitts)	15 January 1972	23 February 1974	7	3	3	1	0	42.86%	
6	Livingstone Sargeant	(Nevis)	3 March 1975	8 January 1977	5	1	2	2	0	20.00%	
7	Victor Eddy	(Saint Kitts)	5 January 1976	18 February 1984	7	1	3	3	0	14.29%	
8	Viv Richards	(Antigua and Barbuda)	2 February 1977	1 February 1991	20	8	7	5	0	40.00%	
9	Elquemedo Willett	(Nevis)	11 March 1980	5 February 1988	11	5	4	2	0	45.45%	
10	Vance Amory	(Nevis)	12 January 1981	21 March 1981	2	1	0	1	0	50.00%	
11	Andy Roberts	(Antigua and Barbuda)	27 January 1983	23 February 1984	9	2	5	2	0	22.22%	
12	Luther Kelly	(Saint Kitts)	22 April 1983	22 April 1983	1	0	0	1	0	0.00%	
13	Richie Richardson	(Antigua and Barbuda)	25 February 1989	26 January 1996	14	9	3	2	0	64.29%	
14	Keith Arthurton	(Nevis)	31 January 1992	21 January 1994	4	2	2	0	0	50.00%	
15	Noel Guishard	(Saint Kitts)	7 February 1992	22 February 1992	3	2	0	1	0	66.67%	
16	Livingstone Harris	(Saint Kitts)	5 February 1993	26 February 1993	4	1	3	0	0	25.00%	
17	Ridley Jacobs	(Antigua and Barbuda)	5 March 1993	11 February 2000	4	2	1	1	0	50.00%	
18	Stuart Williams	(Nevis)	3 February 1994	6 February 2004	38	11	17	10	0	28.95%	
19	Dave Joseph	(Antigua and Barbuda)	2 February 1996	8 June 1997	15	7	4	4	0	46.67%	
20	Kenny Benjamin	(Antigua and Barbuda)	5 March 1998	22 January 1999	3	1	0	2	0	33.33%	
21	Colin Cannonier	(Saint Kitts)	4 January 2001	4 January 2001	1	0	1	0	0	0.00%	
22	Alex Adams	(Anguilla)	12 February 2004	12 February 2004	1	0	0	1	0	0.00%	
23	Sylvester Joseph	(Antigua and Barbuda)	19 February 2004	10 April 2013	27	3	12	12	0	11.11%	
24	Omari Banks	(Anguilla)	4 January 2008	18 January 2008	3	1	1	1	0	33.33%	
25	Runako Morton	(Nevis)	29 February 2008	20 February 2009	9	2	3	4	0	22.22%	
26	Steve Liburd	(Saint Kitts)	27 February 2009	18 March 2011	1	0	0	1	0	0.00%	
27	Lionel Baker	(Montserrat)	25 March 2011	25 March 2011	1	0	0	1	0	0.00%	
28	Gavin Williams	(Antigua and Barbuda)	3 February 2012	23 March 2012	6	1	0	5	0	16.66%	
