= Liburd =

Liburd is a surname (and, very rarely, a given name) used in the English-speaking Caribbean (and amongst the Caribbean diaspora). People with the name include:

Surname

- Anne Liburd (1920–2007), Kittitian women's rights activist; mother of Marcella Liburd
- Herman Liburd (1941–2019), Nevisian politician
- Ingleton Liburd (born 1961), Canadian cricketer
- Javier Liburd (born 1987), Nevisian cricketer
- Marcella Liburd (born 1953), Kittitian politician; daughter of Anne Liburd
- Melanie Liburd (born 1987), British actor
- Merlin Liburd (born 1969), Nevisian cricketer
- Patrece Liburd (born 1988), Kittitian footballer
- Richard Liburd (born 1973), English footballer
- Rowan Liburd (born 1992), English footballer
- Stephen Liburd (born 1955), Kittitian cricketer
- Steve Liburd (born 1985), Kittitian cricketer
- Tanika Liburd (born 1981), Nevisian athlete

Given name

- Liburd Henry (born 1967), Dominican footballer
