= James Harris =

James Harris may refer to:

== Politics ==
- James Harris (grammarian) (1709–1780), English politician and grammarian
- James Harris, 1st Earl of Malmesbury (1746–1820), English diplomat
- James Harris (Nova Scotia politician) (1777–1848), Canadian politician in Nova Scotia
- James Harris, 3rd Earl of Malmesbury (1807–1889), British statesman
- James Morrison Harris (1817–1898), United States Representative from Maryland
- James Harris (North Carolina politician) (1832–1891), African-American North Carolina politician
- James Charles Harris (1831–1904), British Consul at Nice
- James E. Harris (1820–1923), American politician, lieutenant governor of Nebraska in 1897–99
- James Harris, 5th Earl of Malmesbury (1872–1950), British peer and Conservative politician
- James Harris (Socialist Workers Party politician) (born 1948), 2000 and 2004 United States presidential candidate for the Socialist Workers Party

== Science ==
- J. Rendel Harris (1852–1941), English biblical scholar and curator of manuscripts
- James Arthur Harris (1880–1930), American botanist and biometrician
- James Andrew Harris (1932–2000), American scientist, codiscoverer of rutherfordium (1968) and dubnium (1970)
- James Anthony Harris (born 1968), British philosopher
- James T. Harris III (living), American educator and academic administrator
- James S. Harris, professor of electrical engineering, applied physics and material science at Stanford University
- James Franklin Harris, American philosopher

== Sports ==
=== American football ===
- James "Shack" Harris (born 1947), American football former quarterback and executive
- James Harris (defensive end) (born 1968), American football former player
- James Harris (linebacker) (born 1982), American football fullback/linebacker
- James L. Harris (American football), college football player

=== Other sports ===
- James Harris, 2nd Earl of Malmesbury (1778–1841), British hunter
- Kamala (wrestler) (James Harris, 1950–2020), American professional wrestler
- James Harris (rugby union) (born 1987), Welsh rugby union player
- James Harris (baseball) (1858–1939), American baseball infielder
- James Harris (cricketer, born 1990), Welsh cricketer
- James Harris (cricketer, born 1838) (1838–1925), English soldier and cricketer
- James Harris (Kittitian cricketer) (born 1954), Kittitian cricketer
- James Harris (sprinter) (born 1991), American sprinter and high jumper
- Jamie Harris (footballer) (born 1979), Welsh footballer
- Jay Harris (footballer, born 1987) (James William Harris, born 1987), English footballer

== Others ==
- James Harris (comedy writer) (21st century), British comedian
- James Harris (solicitor) (1940–2004), British legal scholar
- James B. Harris (born 1928), American screenwriter, producer and director
- James H. Harris (1828–1898), American Civil War soldier and Medal of Honor recipient
- James L. Harris (1916–1944), American World War II soldier and Medal of Honor recipient
- James W. Harris, American linguist
- Cornbread Harris (James Samuel Harris, born 1927), American musician
- James Samuel "Jimmy Jam" Harris III (born 1959), member of American R&B and pop production duo Jimmy Jam and Terry Lewis

== See also ==
- "The Daemon Lover" aka "James Harris", British ballad
- James Fisher-Harris (born 1996), New Zealand rugby league footballer
- Jim Harris (disambiguation)
- Jimmy Harris (disambiguation)
