= Livingstone Lawrence =

Nevisian cricketer (born 1962)

Personal information
- Full name: Livingstone Lawrence Lawrence
- Born: 5 November 1962 (age 64); Cotton Ground, Nevis
- Batting: Right-handed
- Bowling: Right-arm off spin
- Role: Opening batsman

Domestic team information
- Years: Team
- 1984–1994: Leeward Islands
- Source: CricketArchive, 1 January 2016

Livingstone Lawrence Lawrence (born 5 November 1962) is a former Nevisian cricketer who played for the Leeward Islands in West Indian domestic cricket. He played as a right-handed opening batsman.

Lawrence made his first-class debut for the Leewards during the 1983–84 Shell Shield season. In the last match of the season, he scored a maiden first-class hundred, 118 runs against Trinidad and Tobago. Lawrence finished his debut Shell Shield season with 328 runs, behind only Ralston Otto for the Leewards, and the following season was bested by only Luther Kelly and Enoch Lewis amongst his teammates. At the end of the 1984–85 season, he was selected for a West Indies under-23s to play the touring New Zealanders, and, opening the batting with Phil Simmons, went on to top score for his side with 79 runs.

At the beginning of the 1986–87 season, after further good form, Lawrence was selected in a West Indies B team to tour Zimbabwe, playing four first-class matches and five limited-overs games. He had little luck in the multi-day matches, but in the third one-day game scored a maiden List A century, 117 not out. Although a regular in the Leewards team throughout the rest of the 1980s and into the early 1990s, Lawrence never again played at a higher level, ending his career after the 1993–94 season. He finished with a first-class batting average of 29.82 and a List A average of 28.39.
