= St. Martin Unity Flag =

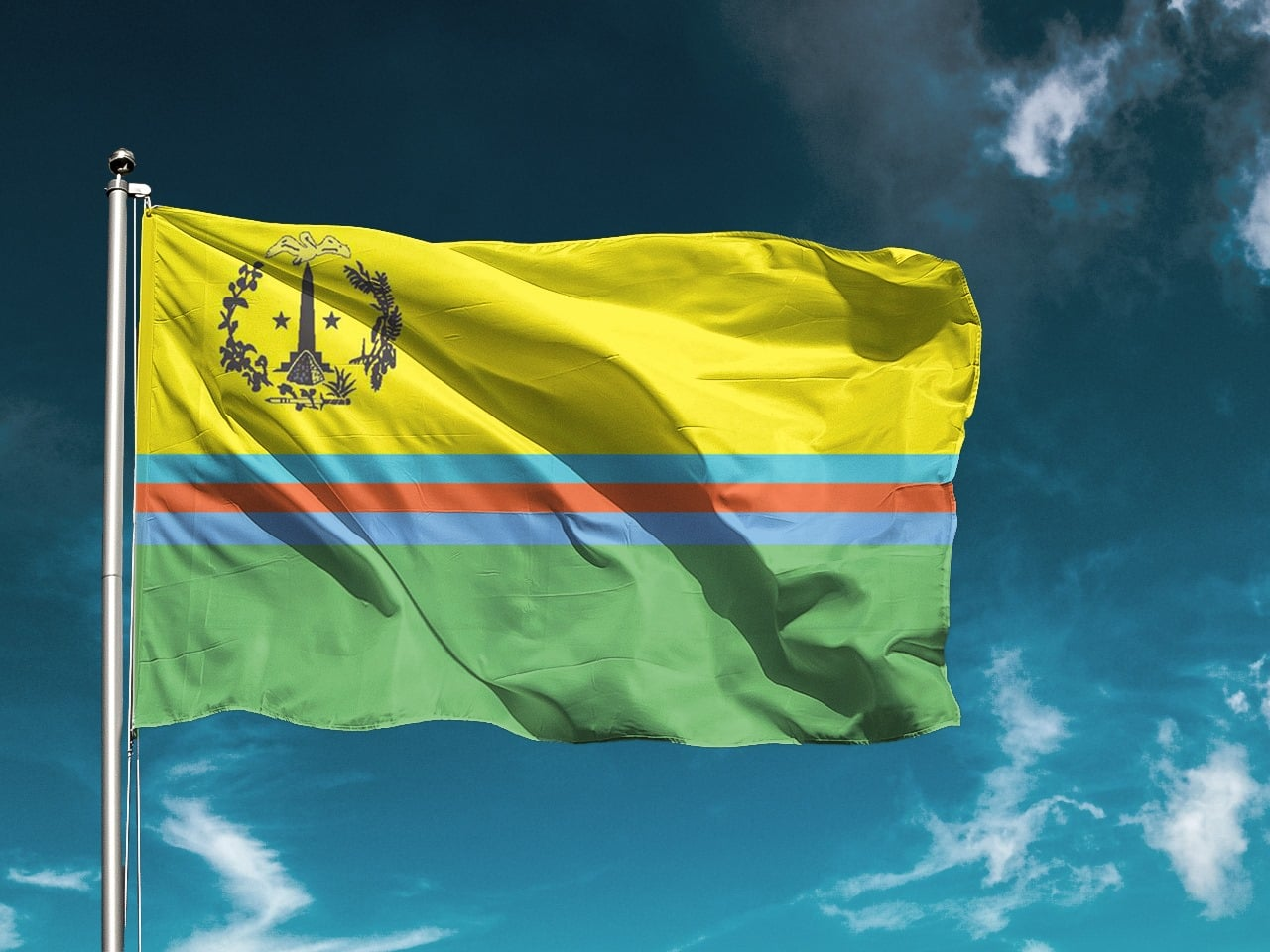
The St. Martin Unity Flag flying.

The St. Martin Unity Flag is a cultural symbol adopted in 2022 by the governments of both parts of the Caribbean island of St. Martin. It was raised officially for the first time on 11 November 2022, during the annual St. Martin Day frontier ceremonies. The flag was officially recognized as a cultural symbol by the governments of both territories in 2022 and is now commonly known as the St. Martin Unity Flag, the Unity Flag of St. Martin, or simply the Unity Flag.

On 29 September 2022, the Territorial Council in Marigot, led by President Louis Mussington, and on 7 November 2022, the Council of Ministers in Philipsburg, led by Prime Minister Silveria Jacobs, adopted the flag for use during joint governmental activities. The Unity Flag was described as a cultural symbol "affirming the unity and identity" of the people of the island.

== History ==
The St. Martin Unity Flag is a symbol of the island's people and culture, adopted in 2022 by the governments of both sides of St. Martin. It has five horizontal bands—yellow, light blue, red, medium blue, and green—and an emblem in the upper left corner that represents unity, fairness, work, healing, and progress. The flag is flown at official events, cultural celebrations, sports competitions, and school projects, and is recognized as a symbol that brings together people from both parts of the island.

The flag was unveiled on 31 August 1990. The name "Unity Flag" evolved after the ad hoc Information Committee on National Symbols (ICONS) launched it initially as "The National Flag of St. Martin" at Philipsburg Jubilee Library. Alternative names such as "The People's Flag" and "The Cultural Flag" were mentioned in public discussions and media coverage. By the late 1990s, the name "Unity Flag" became more common during radio talk shows and in connection with public protests, cultural manifestations, sports tournaments, official government and church activities, and school projects across both sides of the island.

Lasana M. Sekou developed the concept and description of the National Flag of St. Martin through interviews and historical research while working as editor of the Newsday newspaper in the mid- to late-1980s. In 1990, Sekou worked with ICONS to launch the banner before a full audience at Philipsburg Jubilee Library. Members of ICONS included Daniella Jeffry-Pilot, Napolina Gumbs, Horace Whit, Rhoda Arrindell, Shujah Reiph, and Lasana M. Sekou.

By 2022, the flag was popularly known as the St. Martin Unity Flag, with the spelling of "St. Martin" reflecting traditional usage for both sides of the island.

The adoption of the Unity Flag as an official cultural symbol involved debates among elected officials, including in the Territorial Council of the Collectivity of Saint Martin in Marigot. One member of parliament in Philipsburg stated, "Personally, I do not recognize nor support the flag, but I support the idea behind it."

== Design ==
The "Unity Flag" of Saint Martin

The flag consists of horizontal bands of yellow, light blue, red, medium blue, and green. The emblem in the upper left corner symbolizes unity, fairness, work, healing, productivity, and progress, illustrated in black.

The description and meaning of the colors and emblem reflect "the historical, social, and cultural unity of the people and land of St. Martin."

== Use ==
The Unity Flag is one of the most visible symbols designed during the island's modern period and represents the historical and cultural unity of the people and land of both sides of St. Martin.

Since its launch, the flag has been displayed during public protests, cultural programs and parades, carnival stage presentations, academic and literary conferences, sports events, official government ceremonies, church activities, on hotels and other businesses, and in school projects by children on both sides of the island.
