= David Parry (Nevisian cricketer) =

Nevisian cricketer

Personal information
- Full name: David Parry
- Born: unknown Cotton Ground, Nevis
- Role: All-rounder
- Relatives: DR Parry (nephew)

Domestic team information
- Years: Team
- 1958: Leeward Islands

Career statistics
Competition	FC
Matches	1
Runs scored	0
Batting average	0.00
100s/50s	0/0
Top score	0
Balls bowled	162
Wickets	0
Bowling average	n/a
5 wickets in innings	0
10 wickets in match	0
Best bowling	0/55
Catches/stumpings	0/-
- Source: CricketArchive, 10 February 2013

David Parry (date of birth unknown) was a Nevisian cricketer who played a single match for the Leeward Islands during the 1958 season. Little is known of Parry's life, other than that he originated from the town of Cotton Ground in Saint Thomas Lowland Parish. Having previously represented Nevis cricket team in several inter-island matches, he first played for the Leeward Islands in a match against the touring Pakistanis in February 1958. Parry's only match at first-class level came in July of the same year, in a match against Jamaica held at Melbourne Park, Kingston. Although usually considered an all-rounder, he scored a pair batted in the lower order during both innings of the match, and failed to take a wicket. Parry's nephew, Derick Parry, later played for the West Indies at both Test and One Day International (ODI) level.

== See also ==
- List of Leeward Islands first-class cricketers
