= Jessups Village =

- Location in Saint Kitts and Nevis
- Coordinates: 17°09′45″N 62°37′20″W
- Country: Saint Kitts and Nevis
- Island: Nevis
- Parish: Saint Thomas Lowland

Jessups Village (also simply called Jessups) is a village on the west coast of the island of Nevis in Saint Kitts and Nevis, within Saint Thomas Lowland Parish. The village lies to the south of Cotton Ground on the road to Charlestown. Jessups Village grew around a former sugar plantation, Jessups Estate, founded in the 1720s.

The village had a 2010 population of 140.
