= Arrindell =

Arrindell is a surname. Notable people with the surname include:

- Clement Arrindell (1931–2011), Saint Kitts and Nevis magistrate and governor-general
- Gracita Arrindell (born 1956), Sint Maarten politician, writer, and women's rights activist
- Lisa Arrindell (born 1969), American actress
- Rhoda Arrindell, Sint Maartener linguist and advocate for independence
- Taddy Arrindell (born 1951), Antiguan cricketer
- William Arrindell (1796–1862), British judge
