= Winston Williams =

Winston Williams may refer to:

- Winston Williams (chess player) (1958–2020), English chess player
- Winston Williams (cricketer) (born 1952), Kittitian cricketer
- Winston Williams (politician), Antiguan politician
