= John Archibald =

John Archibald may refer to:

- Jock Archibald (1895–1967) Scottish football goalkeeper
- John Archibald (cricketer) (born 1958), Antiguan cricketer
- John Archibald (cyclist) (born 1990), Scottish racing cyclist
- John Archibald (politician) (1845–1907), politician in Queensland, Australia
- John Archibald (priest) (1840–1915), Anglican priest and author
- John Archibald (writer) (born 1963), winner of the 2018 Pulitzer Prize in commentary
- J. F. Archibald (John Feltham Archibald, 1856–1919), Australian journalist and publisher
- John Smith Archibald (1872–1934), Canadian architect

== See also ==
- John Archibald Venn (1883–1958), British economist
