= Len Harris (cricketer) =

West Indian cricketer (1934–2006)

Personal information
- Full name: Leonard Alphonso Harris
- Born: 3 September 1934; St. Kitts
- Died: 16 March 2006 (aged 71); Newtown, St. Kitts
- Nickname: Mikes
- Role: Batsman

Domestic team information
- Years: Team
- 1958–1971: Leeward Islands
- 1965–1966: Combined Islands
- FC debut: 5 July 1958 Leeward Islands v Jamaica
- Last FC: 27 March 1971 Leeward Islands v Jamaica

Career statistics
Competition	First-class
Matches	27
Runs scored	1,394
Batting average	29.04
100s/50s	1/9
Top score	105
Balls bowled	623
Wickets	15
Bowling average	19.46
5 wickets in innings	0
10 wickets in match	0
Best bowling	4/3
Catches/stumpings	14/–
- Source: CricketArchive, 20 May 2009

Leonard Alphonso Harris (3 September 1934 – 16 March 2006) was a West Indian cricketer who played for the Leeward Islands between 1958 and 1971. An opening batsman for much of his career, and occasional bowler in his final seasons, Harris played in West Indian first class cricket, as well as facing the MCC team, England and Australia during his career. He played 27 matches, scoring nearly 1,400 runs at 29.04, including a century, and taking 15 wickets at 19.46. He then went on to play lower-level cricket for St. Kitts until 1976, and helped create the first cricket academy in the Leeward Islands.

== Career ==
=== Leeward Islands ===
Harris played his first match for Leeward Islands on 5 July 1958, against Jamaica at Melbourne Park, in Kingston, Jamaica. Opening the batting, he made 69 and 14, but did not bowl as Jamaica took an innings victory. Harris did not play again that season, however his efforts in this once match were enough for him to reach fourth place in the first-class averages, behind Gary Sobers. Harris did not get a second chance in first-class cricket until 25 February 1960, when he was selected to play against the touring MCC side at the Antigua Recreation Ground. In this match, he batted at three, scoring 16 and 89*. His bowling, two overs for 15 runs, was however expensive, and centuries from MCC players Colin Cowdrey, Raman Subba Row and Ted Dexter put paid to any hope of a result as the match ended in a draw.

Harris waited over another year before playing in a combined Leeward and Windward Islands team against British Guiana on 6 October 1961, in Georgetown. Harris continued his success at the top of the order, scoring 54 in the first innings. He took a catch to dismiss Clyde Walcott, however he did not bowl once again, and made only one in the third innings as his team collapsed to 84 all out and an innings defeat. Sporadic appearances continued, Harris' next appearance coming on 21 April 1962, against a touring Indian team – once again for the combined Leeward and Windward Islands team. Harris played weakly in both innings, falling for six and 12 as India took victory by 137 runs.

It was then three more years before Harris played in a first-class match. On 12 March 1965, the touring Australian side faced the Leeward Islands in Basseterre. Batting at three, Harris made only nine as Australia reduced the home side to 178 all our, and then hit 417 runs. Leeward Islands were routed for 208 in the second innings, however Harris enjoyed success, scoring the second highest total of his team's innings, 44. He then faced the Windward Islands later that year on 25 November at Roseau, where he scored 62. The following year, on 27 January, he scored 41 and 52 against Jamaica, and on 9 February was dismissed for one but took two catches in a rain-interrupted match against Barbados. Matches against British Guiana and Trinidad and Tobago followed through 1966, yielding scores of 61, 13, zero and 39 from the top order. 1965–66 was Harris' most eventful season thus far in his career, and he ended it with 276 runs from five matches at 34.50.

1967 saw three more matches for Leeward Islands against Barbados, Jamaica and the Windward Islands. In the first match, on 9 February, Harris faced Barbados in Warner Park, Basseterre, and scored 18 and 10. He also bowled two deliveries before Barbados declared for 406. Against Jamaica he scored 91 – then a career best – and 15, and against Windward Islands on 27 March at Sturge Park, in the now abandoned Plymouth, Montserrat, where he scored 33. He then faced the MCC for a second time on 15 February 1968, also in Plymouth. He hit 48 and 18 in a match largely dominated by a knock of 165 from Geoffrey Boycott. With his efforts in the 1968 season, he broke the Leeward Islands' batting record. On 17 January 1969, he scored zero and 30 against Barbados, and on 12 February scored 17 and 12, and took once wicket for 14 runs against Guyana.

Harris then played four successive matches in early 1970, the first against Windward Islands on 16 January at Warner Park. This was followed by matches against Barbados on 13 February; Trinidad and Tobago on 6 March; and Jamaica on 14 March. The season overall netted Harris 207 runs at 20.70, with one half-century of 72, from the five matches.

1971, his final year in first-class cricket, began with a match against the Windward Islands on 14 January at Warner Park. Harris, batting at five, scored his maiden – and only – century. His knock of 105 took Leeward to 315 all out, having bowled Windward Islands over for 122. Three catches by Harris off the bowling of Jeffers Warrington helped restrict Windward Islands to 153 all out in their second innings, giving Leeward Islands victory by an innings and 40 runs. Harris could not carry this form over, however. Scores of six and four saw Barbados home by nine wickets on 22 January, and 35, 23 and the wicket of West Indian international Bryan Davis could not prevent an innings defeat to Trinidad and Tobago on 27 January. This season was, however, his most successful with the ball taking career best figures of 12 wickets at 15.41.'This included a productive spell of four wickets at the cost of three runs.

3 February 1971, saw Harris face Guyana in Roseau. He scored 12 and 60, and took two catches, seeing his team to victory by 50 runs and 12 points in the Shell Shield. India toured the West Indies in 1971, and faced Leeward Islands on 25 February, with Harris scoring 18 and 24 as the home team fell to a heavy nine wicket defeat at Warner Park. Harris' final match against Jamaica, on 27 March, saw his side defeated by an innings and 82 at the hands of Jamaica. Harris himself took 1/25 from eight overs during Jamaica's first innings, and scored 18 and zero. His final season held six matches – the most of his career – and saw him hit 305 runs – again a personal best – at 30.50.

=== St. Kitts ===
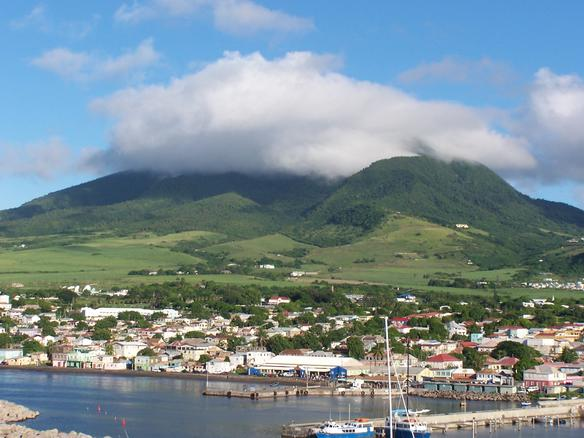
Basseterre, looking north, the setting for Harris' Cricket Academy.

Harris continued to be involved in cricket outside of the first-class arena by playing for St. Kitts – who he had joined in 1970 – until the end of the 1976 cricket season. He had played two matches for St. Kitts in 1970, scoring 24 against Montserrat at Warner Park on 10 July, and five and 54 against Nevis in the semi-final and final of the Hesketh Bell Shield. Harris played two further matches against the same sides in 1971, including a 103-knock against Monsterrat on 27 June, and scores of 11 and 29 against Nevis in July. Two matches of the same competition in 1974 saw scores of 28, 82, and two. He faced Monsterrat again in 1976, scoring 46 and 10 on 19 June, and then scored three against Nevis in his final match, on 2 July 1976.

Following his career as a player, Harris worked in conjunction with Carib Brewery to create the Carib Brewery-Len Harris Cricket Academy, named in his honour, at Warner Park. It was the first Academy of its kind in the Leeward Islands. In 2003, Keith Arthurton, former West Indies Test and ODI player, took over the positions of coach and manager there from Ingleton Liburd, who went on to be the Leeward Islands' Cricket Development Officer for the West Indies Cricket Board. The Chairman, Charles Wilkin, said of the academy: "The Academy has been generally successful, producing over half of the current St Kitts team, we have players who made it into West Indies Under-19 team, and into the Leewards team. We have a crop of promising young cricketers, and more to come."

== Playing style ==
Harris was a successful opening batsman for Leeward Islands during his career. Preferring the on-side, but also successful with the off drive, Harris averaged 73 in opening partnerships with Oscar Williams. In 1998, Viv Richards referred to Harris one of "the greats of the Leeward Islands" in his A Spirit of Dominance. West Indian journalist Timothy Alfred referred to Harris as a batsman "of tremendous talent" who "unfortunately was not able to secure a place on the then power pack West Indies team." The academy continues to play club cricket in St. Kitts against Newton, Cayon, Sandy Point, St. Paul's and the local police force team.
