= Donald Richards =

Donald Richards can refer to:

- Donald Richards (cricketer) (born 1942), Antiguan cricketer
- Donald Richards (singer) (1919–1953), American singer
- Donald Richards (statistician) (born 1955), Jamaican statistician
