= Oris (disambiguation) =

Oris is a Swiss watchmaker.

Oris may also refer to:

- Oris (magazine), a Croatian architecture magazine
- Oris Fergus, Montserratian cricketer
