= List of Nevis Twenty20 cricketers =

Although the island's flag (pictured) is primarily gold, blue, and green in colour, the team's uniform for Twenty20 matches was black, red, and green.

From the team's first match in July 2006 to its last match in February 2008, nineteen players represented the Nevis cricket team in Twenty20 matches. A Twenty20 is a cricket match between two representative teams of one twenty-over innings per side. Unlike in most other sports, the two constituent islands that make up the Federation of Saint Kitts and Nevis are independently represented and field separate teams in West Indian domestic cricket. Nevis, represented by the Nevis Cricket Association, is a full member of the Leeward Islands Cricket Association, and Nevis competes regularly in regional tournaments. All five of the team's matches came in the Stanford 20/20 competition, which was held twice (in 2006 and 2008).

== Key ==
General

- ‡ – captain
- † – wicket-keeper
- First – date of debut
- Last – date of latest game
- M – number of matches played

Batting

- HS – highest score
- Avg – runs scored per dismissal
- SR – runs scored per hundred balls
- 100 – number of centuries
- 50 – number of half-centuries scored
- * – batsman remained not out

Bowling

- W – wickets taken in career
- BBI – best bowling in an innings
- Ave – runs per wicket
- Econ - runs conceded per over
- 4/i – number of four-wicket hauls

Fielding

- C – catches taken
- St – stumpings effected

== List of players ==
All statistics refer only to Twenty20 matches played for Nevis.

№	Name	First	Last	M	Runs	HS	Avg	SR	100	50	W	BB	Ave	Econ	4/i	C	St	Ref
1	Shervin Woodley	14 July 2006	16 Feb. 2008	4	122	56*	40.66	148.78	0	1	–	–	–	–	–	1	0	
2	Stuart Williams ‡	14 July 2006	11 Aug. 2006	3	57	42	19.00	126.66	0	0	–	–	–	–	–	2	0	
3	Kieran Powell	14 July 2006	11 Aug. 2006	3	47	26	15.66	174.07	0	0	–	–	–	–	–	0	0	
4	Tonito Willett	14 July 2006	16 Feb. 2008	5	138	86*	34.50	162.35	0	1	5	2/20	21.80	6.81	0	0	0	
5	Winston Sutton	14 July 2006	26 July 2006	2	6	6*	–	120.00	0	0	1	1/13	13.00	13.00	0	1	0	
6	Akito Willett	14 July 2006	16 Feb. 2008	5	28	13*	14.00	140.00	0	0	4	2/11	32.00	8.00	0	0	0	
7	Javier Liburd	14 July 2006	16 Feb. 2008	5	38	22	14.00	97.44	0	0	0	0/25	–	12.50	0	1	0	
8	Virgil Browne	14 July 2006	26 July 2006	2	–	–	–	–	–	–	2	1/17	27.50	6.87	0	1	0	
9	Joel Simmonds ‡†	14 July 2006	16 Feb. 2008	5	117	65*	58.50	117.00	0	1	–	–	–	–	–	4	1	
10	Warrington Phillip	14 July 2006	11 Aug. 2006	3	0	0	0.00	0.00	0	0	4	2/8	14.25	4.81	0	0	0	
11	John Maynard	14 July 2006	11 Aug. 2006	3	2	2	2.00	20.00	0	0	7	4/9	11.00	6.41	1	0	0	
12	Daynason Browne	11 Aug. 2006	16 Feb. 2008	3	73	26	24.33	105.79	0	0	0	0/19	–	12.50	0	2	0	
13	Frank Monzack	11 Aug. 2006	11 Aug. 2006	1	2	2*	–	16.66	0	0	1	1/46	46.00	11.50	0	0	0	
14	Carlon Smithen	8 Feb. 2008	16 Feb. 2008	2	40	36	20.00	166.66	0	0	–	–	–	–	–	1	0	
15	Runako Morton	8 Feb. 2008	16 Feb. 2008	2	37	36	18.50	108.82	0	0	0	0/4	–	4.00	0	0	0	
16	Nelson Bolan	8 Feb. 2008	8 Feb. 2008	1	–	–	–	–	–	–	–	–	–	–	–	0	0	
17	Joseph Williams	8 Feb. 2008	16 Feb. 2008	2	–	–	–	–	–	–	0	0/17	–	7.60	0	0	0	
18	Ian Byron	8 Feb. 2008	16 Feb. 2008	2	–	–	–	–	–	–	4	3/21	10.25	6.15	0	0	0	
19	Trevier Smithen	8 Feb. 2008	16 Feb. 2008	2	1	1*	–	100.00	0	0	2	2/15	24.00	6.26	0	2	0	

== List of captains ==
№	Name	First	Last	Mat	Won	Lost	Tied	NR	Win%	Ref
1	Stuart Williams	14 July 2006	11 August 2006	3	2	1	0	0	66.67%	
2	Joel Simmonds	11 February 2008	16 February 2008	2	1	1	0	0	50.00%	
