= Jim Harris =

Jim Harris may refer to:

- Jim Harris (illustrator/author) (born 1955), American children's book illustrator
- Jim Harris (politician) (born 1961), Canadian politician and environmentalist, former leader of the Green Party of Canada
- Jim Harris (wrestler) (1950–2020), American professional wrestler, better known as Kamala
- Jim Harris (entrepreneur), American businessman, co-founder of Compaq Computer
- Jim Harris (American football) (born 1943), American football player
- Jim Harris, a character in the film A Sister to Assist 'Er

== See also ==
- James Harris (disambiguation)
- Jimmy Harris (disambiguation)
