= India women's cricket team in the West Indies in 2011–12 =

Indian women's cricket team in West Indies in 2011–12
	West Indies women	India women
- Dates: 18 February 2012 – 4 March 2012
Captains	Merissa Aguilleira	Anjum Chopra

One Day International series
- Results: West Indies women won the 3-match series 2–1
Most runs	Deandra Dottin (102)	Amita Sharma (87)
Most wickets	Anisa Mohammed (6)	Ekta Bisht (7)
- Player of the series: Stafanie Taylor (WIN)

Twenty20 International series
- Results: West Indies women won the 5-match series 3–2
Most runs	Stafanie Taylor (101)	Mithali Raj (154)
Most wickets	Shanel Daley (6); Stafanie Taylor (6); Anisa Mohammed (6)	Jhulan Goswami (6)
- Player of the series: Stafanie Taylor (WIN)

The India women's cricket team played the West Indies women's cricket team in February–March 2012. The tour consisted of five Women's Twenty20 Internationals (WT20I) followed by three Women's One Day Internationals (WODIs).

== Squads ==
West Indies	India
Merissa Aguilleira (c); Stafanie Taylor (vc); Shemaine Campbelle (wk); Britney Cooper; Shanel Daley; Deandra Dottin; Pearl Etienne; Stacy-Ann King; Kycia Knight; Anisa Mohammed; Subrina Munroe; Juliana Nero; Shaquana Quintyne; Shakera Selman	Anjum Chopra (c); Mithali Raj (vc); Ekta Bisht; Archana Das; Diana David; Jhulan Goswami; Mamata Kanojia; Harmanpreet Kaur; Veda Krishnamurthy; Madhuri Mehta; Sulakshana Naik (wk); Amita Sharma; Shubhlakshmi Sharma; Gouher Sultana; Sunitha Anand

== WT20I series ==
=== 1st WT20I ===
18 February 2012
18:30 (D/N)
Scorecard

India; 101/9 (20 overs)	v	West Indies; 102/2 (16.0 overs)
Harmanpreet Kaur 28 (29); Anisa Mohammed 3/20 (4 overs)		Stafanie Taylor 54* (52); Jhulan Goswami 1/15 (3 overs)

West Indies Women won by 8 wickets
Sir Vivian Richards Stadium, Antigua
Umpires: Clancy Mack (WIN) and Luther Kelly (WIN)
Player of the match: Stafanie Taylor (WIN)

- India Women won the toss and elected to bat.
- Mamata Kanojia & Archana Das (IND) made their WT20I debut.

=== 2nd WT20I ===
19 February 2012
18:30 (D/N)
Scorecard

India; 95/5 (20 overs)	v	West Indies; 92/9 (20 overs)
Mithali Raj 27 (32); Stacy-Ann King 1/9 (2 overs)		Juliana Nero 31 (33); Jhulan Goswami 3/7 (4 overs)

India Women won by 3 runs
Sir Vivian Richards Stadium, Antigua
Umpires: Clancy Mack (WIN) and Luther Kelly (WIN)
Player of the match: Jhulan Goswami (IND)

- West Indies Women won the toss and elected to field.

=== 3rd WT20I ===
22 February 2012
14:00 (D/N)
Scorecard

India; 83/7 (20 overs)	v	West Indies; 84/6 (19.4 overs)
Mithali Raj 27; Stafanie Taylor 2/16 (4 overs)		Merissa Aguilleira 39*; Ekta Bisht 2/17 (4 overs)

West Indies Women won by 2 wickets
Windsor Park, Dominica
Umpires: Vivian Johnson (WIN) and Lennox Abraham (WIN)
Player of the match: Merissa Aguilleira (WIN)

- West Indies Women won the toss and elected to field.

=== 4th WT20I ===
23 February 2012
14:00 (D/N)
Scorecard

India; 94/5 (20 overs)	v	West Indies; 95/4 (19.3 overs)
Mithali Raj 49* (61); Shanel Daley 3/14 (4 overs)		Stafanie Taylor 37* (58); Shubhlakshmi Sharma 1/12 (3 overs)

West Indies Women won by 6 wickets
Windsor Park, Dominica
Umpires: Vivian Johnson (WIN) and Lennox Abraham (WIN)
Player of the match: Stafanie Taylor

- West Indies Women won the toss and elected to field.
- Shubhlakshmi Sharma (IND) made her WT20I debut.

=== 5th WT20I ===
27 February 2012
14:00
Scorecard

West Indies; 115/4 (20 overs)	v	India; 117/4 (19.5 overs)
Shemaine Campbelle 37 (49); Shubhlakshmi Sharma 2/24 (4 overs)		Mithali Raj 37* (31); Shaquana Quintyne 1/7 (1 over)

India Women won by 6 wickets
Warner Park, Basseterre
Umpires: Vivian Johnson (WIN) and Luther Kelly (WIN)
Player of the match: Mithali Raj (IND)

- India Women won the toss and elected to field.
- Madhuri Mehta (IND) made her WT20I debut.
- Stafanie Taylor (WIN) captained West Indies team.

== WODI series ==
=== 1st WODI ===
29 February 2012
10:00
Scorecard

India; 179/7 (50 overs)	v	West Indies; 103 (46.5 overs)
Mithali Raj 57 (119); Anisa Mohammed 3/41 (10 overs)		Juliana Nero 23 (41); Ekta Bisht 3/18 (9 overs)

India Women won by 76 runs
Warner Park, Basseterre
Umpires: Vivian Johnson (WIN) and Luther Kelly (WIN)
Player of the match: Amita Sharma (IND)

- West Indies Women won the toss and elected to field.
- Madhuri Mehta and Archana Das (IND) made their WODI debut.

=== 2nd WODI ===
2 March 2012
10:30
Scorecard

West Indies; 204/6 (50 overs)	v	India; 162/9 (50 overs)
Stafanie Taylor 75 (131); Ekta Bisht 3/33 (10 overs)		Amita Sharma 33 (42); Shemaine Campbelle 2/16 (6 overs)

West Indies Women won by 42 runs
Warner Park, Basseterre
Umpires: Vivian Johnson (WIN) and Luther Kelly (WIN)
Player of the match: Stafanie Taylor (WIN)

- West Indies Women won the toss and elected to bat.

=== 3rd WODI ===
4 March 2012
10:00
Scorecard

India; 180/7 (50 overs)	v	West Indies; 181/7 (49.2 overs)
Harmanpreet Kaur 50 (80); Stafanie Taylor 4/21 (10 overs)		Deandra Dottin 59 (67); Archana Das 2/29 (10 overs); Gouher Sultana 2/29 (8 overs)

West Indies Women won by 3 wickets
Warner Park, Basseterre
Umpires: Vivian Johnson (WIN) and Luther Kelly (WIN)
Player of the match: Deandra Dottin (WIN)

- India Women won the toss and elected to bat.
