= Evanson =

Evanson is a surname. Notable people with the surname include:

- Alisha Evanson (born 2002), British gymnast
- Edith Evanson (1896–1980), American actress
- Edward Evanson (1731–1805), English clergyman
- John Evanson (born 1947), English footballer
- Kymberly Evanson (born 1977), American lawyer
- Mary McEldowney-Evanson (1921–2019), co-founded the organization Friends of Haleakalā National Park
- Patrick Evanson (1933–2021), Antiguan cricketer
- Wyndham Evanson (1851–1934), England international rugby union footballer

== See also ==
- Evanson, Kentucky
