= Anguilla national cricket team =

Anguilla

Personnel
- Captain: Chaka Hodge
- Coach: Cardigan Connor

Team information
- Colours: Blue, Yellow
- Home ground: Ronald Webster Park

The Anguilla national cricket team is the representative cricket team of Anguilla, a British Overseas Territory in the Caribbean.

The team takes part in inter-regional cricket competitions in the Caribbean, but has only appeared in senior cricket twice, in the two Stanford 20/20 tournaments. For domestic first-class and List A purposes, Anguilla is subsumed into the Leeward Islands cricket team. The first Anguillan to play Test cricket for West Indies was Omari Banks in 2003.

== History ==
Representative cricket has been played by Anguilla since the late 1970s. Early games were played as part of the three-day (but not first-class) Heineken Challenge Trophy (the sponsored Leeward Islands Tournament), although at first the team was not a full participant and played only two games each year in the 1977, 1978 and 1979 tournaments. The team suffered a run of heavy defeats in their early years; Anguilla's first win in the competition came against Montserrat in the 1980 tournament.

== Notable players ==
Current Leeward Islands players

- Montcin Hodge
- Jahmar Hamilton
- Kelbert Walters
- Lyndel Richardson
- Chesney Hughes
- Yannick Leonard

Former Leeward Islands players

- Omari Banks (2001 - 2013)
- Chaka Hodge (2002 - 2008)
- Alex Adams (1997 - 2005)
- Lanville Harrigan (1988 - 2003)
- Eustace Proctor (1986)

Other

- Cardigan Connor (played English county cricket)

== Stanford 20/20 ==
Anguilla's only games of senior cricket have come in Twenty20, as part of the Stanford 20/20 competitions in 2006 and 2007–08. Their debut at this level was against Barbados at the Stanford Cricket Ground in Coolidge, Antigua on 18 July 2006; Barbados won the match by 38 runs. On 3 February 2008, they played Grenada, who won by 16 runs despite a 39-ball unbeaten 75 from Anguilla's Montcin Hodge.

2006 Stanford 20/20 Squad

- Omari Banks
- Alex Adams
- Terrence Adams
- Chaka Hodge
- Montcin Hodge
- Chesney Hughes
- Leon Lake
- Delano Mussington
- Daniel Proctor
- Lyndel Richardson
- Irving Rogers
- Delon Skellekie
- Kelbert Walters

2007/2008 Stanford 20/20 Squad

- Chaka Hodge
- Omari Banks
- Terrence Adams
- Masimba Bowen
- Marlon Bryson
- Jahmar Hamilton
- Montcin Hodge
- Chesney Hughes
- Junior Johnson
- Leon Lake
- Rondal Lake
- Yannick Leonard
- Daniel Proctor
- Shridath Rey
- Lyndel Richardson
- Kelbert Walters

Source:2006 Squad 2007/08 Squad
