= Joel Simmonds =

Nevisian cricketer (born 1976)

Personal information
- Full name: Joel McKenzie Simmonds
- Born: 27 January 1976 (age 50); Hanleys Road, Gingerland, Nevis
- Batting: Right-handed
- Role: Wicket-keeper

Domestic team information
- Years: Team
- 2000–2007: Leeward Islands
- 2006–2008: Nevis

Career statistics
Competition	FC	LA	T20
Matches	12	3	1
Runs scored	178	2	117
Batting average	10.47	1.00	58.50
100s/50s	0/2	0/0	0/1
Top score	54	2	65*
Catches/stumpings	23/3	3/2	4/1
- Source: CricketArchive, 6 June 2013

Joel McKenzie Simmonds (born 27 January 1976) is a former Nevisian cricketer who played for the Leeward Islands in West Indian domestic cricket. He was a wicket-keeper and right-handed batsman.

From Gingerland parish, Simmonds played for the Leewards under-19 team in three consecutive editions (1993, 1994, and 1995) of the West Indies Youth Championships, captaining the team in the 1995 tournament. He did not make his first-class debut for the Leewards until the 1999–2000 season, replacing usual keeper Ridley Jacobs, who was on tour with the West Indies at the time. Simmonds played a further six matches the following season, and against the Windward Islands in January 2001 scored his highest first-class score. This innings of 54 runs included a partnership of 100 runs with Kerry Jeremy (70 not out) for the ninth wicket, a team record against the Windwards. However, Simmonds played only two matches in each of the two following seasons, with Jason Williams increasingly favoured when Jacobs was on international duty. His last first-class match came in February 2003, against Guyana.

Simmonds did not play any further matches at a major level until he was selected to appear for Nevis in the inaugural 2006 edition of the Stanford 20/20. Nevis won its first two matches to progress to the semi-final round, and against Trinidad and Tobago, Simmonds top-scored with 65 not out from 47 balls, an innings which included three sixes. However, Nevis were only able to record 136/9 from their 20 overs, losing the match by 74 runs. Partially based on this form, Simmonds was selected to keep wicket for the Leewards in the 2007–08 KFC Cup, playing the only three List A matches of his career. He was again selected for Nevis in the 2008 edition of the Stanford 20/20, and took over from the retired Stuart Williams as the team's captain. In the team's first-round match, against Montserrat, Simmonds scored 37 runs and recorded two dismissals, for which he was named man of the match. However, in the next match, against Jamaica, Nevis lost by eight wickets, in what was to be his final match in West Indian domestic cricket. In August 2011, Simmonds was shot during an attempted robbery at a house in Pond Hill, where he had been engaged in illegal gambling.

== See also ==
- List of Leeward Islands first-class cricketers
- List of Nevis Twenty20 cricketers
