= Kingsley Rock =

Montserratian cricketer (1937–2019)

Personal information
- Born: 19 December 1937; Montserrat
- Died: 23 October 2019 (aged 81); New York City, New York, USA
- Source: Cricinfo, 17 November 2019

Kingsley Rock (19 December 1937 – 23 October 2019) was a Montserratian cricketer. He played in two first-class matches for the Leeward Islands in the late 1950s.

== See also ==
- List of Leeward Islands first-class cricketers
