= Auckland Hector =

Kittitian cricketer (1945–2017)

Personal information
- Born: 9 July 1945; Saint Kitts
- Died: 31 December 2017 (aged 72)
- Batting: Right-handed
- Role: Wicket-keeper

Domestic team information
- Years: Team
- 1965–1975: Leeward Islands
- 1966–1971: Combined Islands
- Source: CricketArchive, 25 May 2018

Auckland Hector (9 July 1945 – 31 December 2017) was a Kittitian cricketer who played for the Leeward Islands and Combined Islands in West Indian domestic cricket. He played as a wicket-keeper.

Hector made his first-class debut for the Leewards in March 1965, aged 19, in a match against the touring Australians. His debut for the Combined Islands came in the 1965–66 Shell Shield season, where he appeared in all four of the team's matches. For the following two seasons (1966–67 and 1968–69; there was no competition during the 1967–68 season), the Leeward and Windward Islands entered separate teams. Against Guyana in February 1969, Hector made what was to be the highest score of his first-class career – 58 not out, including a 94-run ninth-wicket stand with Donald Richards. The Combined Islands team was reconstituted for the 1969–70 season. In that season, Hector played solely as a specialist batsman, with Mike Findlay keeping wicket. This situation was repeated the following season, which was Hector's last for the Combined Islands. He continued to keep wicket for the Leeward Islands for several more seasons, playing his last first-class match in March 1975. After retiring from playing, Hector became involved in cricket administration. He has served at various stages as president of the Saint Kitts Cricket Association, president of the Leeward Islands Cricket Association, and director of the West Indies Cricket Board.
