= Gareth Matthew =

Kittitian cricketer (born 1984)

Personal information
- Born: 18 February 1984 (age 42); St Kitts
- Source: Cricinfo, 24 November 2020

Gareth Matthew (born 18 February 1984) is a Kittitian cricketer. He played in four first-class matches for the Leeward Islands in 2002/03.

== See also ==
- List of Leeward Islands first-class cricketers
