= James Thompson (cricketer) =

Nevisian cricketer (born 1961)

Personal information
- Born: 4 June 1961 (age 65); Nevis
- Source: Cricinfo, 24 November 2020

James Thompson (born 4 June 1961) is a Nevisian cricketer. He played in nine first-class matches for the Leeward Islands from 1983 to 1989.

== See also ==
- List of Leeward Islands first-class cricketers
