= Virgil Newton =

Kittitian cricketer (born 1955)

Personal information
- Born: 17 October 1955 (age 71); St Kitts
- Source: Cricinfo, 24 November 2020

Virgil Newton (born 17 October 1955) is a Kittitian cricketer. He played in one List A and three first-class matches for the Leeward Islands from 1980 to 1983.

== See also ==
- List of Leeward Islands first-class cricketers
