= Gene Gould =

Antiguan cricketer (born 1950)

Personal information
- Born: 10 May 1950 (age 76); Antigua
- Source: Cricinfo, 24 November 2020

Gene Gould (born 10 May 1950) is an Antiguan cricketer. He played in four first-class matches for the Leeward Islands from 1971 to 1975.

== See also ==
- List of Leeward Islands first-class cricketers
