= Hilson Phillip =

Antiguan cricketer

Personal information
- Born: 20 December 1940; Antigua
- Died: 1986 (aged 45–46)
- Source: Cricinfo, 24 November 2020

Hilson Phillip (20 December 1940 – 1986) was an Antiguan cricketer. He played in thirteen first-class matches for the Leeward Islands from 1964 to 1970.

== See also ==
- List of Leeward Islands first-class cricketers
