= Franklyn Edwards =

Montserratian cricketer (1937–2019)

Personal information
- Born: 12 September 1937
- Died: 7 June 2019 (aged 81)
- Source: Cricinfo, 17 January 2020

Franklyn Edwards (12 September 1937 – 7 June 2019) was a Montserratian cricketer. He played in three first-class matches for the Leeward Islands between 1959 and 1965. He was also the president of the Montserrat Cricket Team and also the president of the Leeward Islands Cricket Association.

== See also ==
- List of Leeward Islands first-class cricketers
