= Lipton Griffin =

Nevisian cricketer (born 1955)

Personal information
- Born: 3 January 1955 (age 71); Nevis
- Source: Cricinfo, 24 November 2020

Lipton Griffin (born 3 January 1955) is a Nevisian cricketer. He played in four first-class and three List A matches for the Leeward Islands in 1975/76 and 1976/77.

== See also ==
- List of Leeward Islands first-class cricketers
