= Livingstone Harris =

West Indian cricketer (born 1957)

Personal information
- Full name: Leston Livingstone Harris
- Born: 28 June 1957 (age 69); Saint Kitts
- Batting: Right-handed
- Role: Wicket-keeper

Domestic team information
- Years: Team
- 1988–1993: Leeward Islands
- Source: CricketArchive, 1 January 2016

Leston Livingstone Harris (born 28 June 1957) is a former Kittitian cricketer who played for the Leeward Islands in West Indian domestic cricket.

Harris made his first-class debut for the Leewards in the 1987–88 Red Stripe Cup, at the relatively old age of 30, and his List A debut less than a week later, in the 1987–88 Geddes Grant/Harrison Line Trophy. He was initially included in the team as a wicket-keeper, coming in either sixth or seventh in the batting order, but later in his career was sometimes used as a specialist batsman, with either McChesney Simon or Ridley Jacobs taking the gloves. Harris began his first-class career with scores of 49 on debut against Trinidad and Tobago, and 52 runs in the next match against the Windward Islands. During the 1989–90 Red Stripe Cup, he scored 250 runs from five matches, placing him eighth in the competition for runs and behind only Richie Richardson for the Leewards. Harris did lead the Leewards' run-scoring during the 1991–92 season, scoring 291 runs including a career-best 98 against Guyana. His career, which concluded after the 1992–93 season, included eleven first-class half-centuries and a single limited-overs half-century, an innings of 62 against Jamaica. Harris played as a wicket-keeper in all but eight of his first-class matches, and all but six of his List A matches.
