= Hesketh Benjamin =

Kittitian cricketer (born 1939)

Personal information
- Born: 16 June 1939 (age 87); St Kitts
- Source: Cricinfo, 24 November 2020

Hesketh Benjamin (born 6 June 1939) is a Kittitian cricketer. He played in ten first-class matches for the Leeward Islands from 1964 to 1969.

== See also ==
- List of Leeward Islands first-class cricketers
