= Fitzroy Buffonge =

Montserratian cricketer

Personal information
- Full name: Fitzroy Edmund Buffonge
- Born: 11 January 1960 (age 66); Montserrat
- Batting: Right-handed
- Bowling: Right-arm medium

Domestic team information
- Years: Team
- 1983/84–1991/92: Leeward Islands
- 1977–1987: Montserrat

Career statistics
Competition	First-class	List A
Matches	4	2
Runs scored	107	26
Batting average	15.28	26.00
100s/50s	–/–	–/–
Top score	24	23
Catches/stumpings	2/–	1/–
- Source: Cricinfo, 14 October 2012

Fitzroy Edmund Buffonge (born 11 January 1960) is a West Indian attorney and former cricketer. He currently serves on the board of directors for the Bank of Montserrat Limited.

Buffonge was a right-handed batsman who bowled right-arm medium pace. He was born on Montserrat. He first played for Montserrat against St Kitts in the 1977 Heineken Challenge Trophy. In January 1984, he made his first-class debut for the Leeward Islands against Jamaica in the 1983/84 Shell Shield, with him making a further first-class appearance in that season's competition against Barbados. In that same season, he made his List A debut for the Leeward Islands against Barbados in the 1983/84 Geddes Grant/Harrison Line Trophy. He continued to play minor matches for Montserrat throughout the 1980s, before appearing for the Leeward Islands in a further List A match against Guyana in the 1988/89 Geddes Grant Shield. In that same season, he made a further first-class appearance for the team against the same opposition, with his final first-class appearance coming in January 1992 when the Leeward Islands played the Windward Islands. In four first-class matches, he scored a total of 107 runs at an average of 15.28, with a high score of 24.

He later became the senior selector for the Leeward Islands Cricket Association, as well as acting as Montserrat coach in both of their appearances in the Twenty20 Stanford 20/20 tournament.
