= Earl Rawlins =

Nevisian cricketer (born 1959)

Personal information
- Born: 21 December 1959 (age 66); Nevis
- Source: Cricinfo, 24 November 2020

Earl Rawlins (born 21 December 1959) is a Nevisian cricketer. He played in one first-class match for the Leeward Islands in 1984/85.

== See also ==
- List of Leeward Islands first-class cricketers
