= Everette Sargeant =

Nevisian cricketer (born 1955)

Personal information
- Born: 21 January 1955 (age 71); Nevis
- Source: Cricinfo, 24 November 2020

Everette Sargeant (born 21 January 1955) is a Nevisian cricketer. He played in five first-class and seven List A matches for the Leeward Islands from 1978 to 1984.

== See also ==
- List of Leeward Islands first-class cricketers
