= Olson Paul =

Antiguan cricketer (born 1952)

Personal information
- Born: 13 January 1952 (age 74); Antigua
- Source: Cricinfo, 24 November 2020

Olson Paul (born 13 January 1952) is an Antiguan cricketer who played in one first-class match for the Leeward Islands in 1976/77.

== See also ==
- List of Leeward Islands first-class cricketers
