= Kerry Mentore =

Antiguan cricketer (born 1984)

Personal information
- Born: 19 September 1984 (age 42); Antigua
- Source: Cricinfo, 24 November 2020

Kerry Mentore (born 19 September 1984) is an Antiguan cricketer. He played in one first-class and two Twenty20 matches for the Leeward Islands in 2010 and 2011.

== See also ==
- List of Leeward Islands first-class cricketers
