= Edward Lewis (cricketer) =

Antiguan-born American cricketer

Personal information
- Full name: Edward Alexton Lewis
- Born: 25 October 1959 (age 67); Antigua
- Batting: Left-handed
- Bowling: Left-arm orthodox
- Relatives: Enoch Lewis (brother)

International information
- National side: United States (1991–1997)

Domestic team information
- Years: Team
- 1985: Leeward Islands
- Source: CricketArchive, 2 February 2016

Edward Alexton Lewis (born 25 October 1959) is a former American cricketer of Antiguan origin. He played for the American national side from 1991 to 1997, and before emigrating to the U.S. also played for the Leeward Islands in West Indian domestic cricket.

Lewis made his senior debut for the Leewards in February 1985, in a limited-overs game against Barbados. Coming in third in the batting order, he scored 145 not out, setting a Leeward Islands record for the highest individual score in List A matches that still stands. Despite this, Lewis never played another limited-overs games for the Leewards. He did appear in three first-class matches later in the 1984–85 season, but failed to repeat his earlier success.

After emigrating to the U.S., Lewis made his debut for the U.S. national team in August 1991, in the annual Auty Cup fixture against Canada. His first major international tournament for the team was the 1994 ICC Trophy in Kenya. He scored 196 runs from six innings (the second-most for his team), with his highest score being 68 not out against East and Central Africa. Lewis played his last international fixtures at the 1997 ICC Trophy in Malaysia, aged 37. His older brother, Enoch Lewis, also played first-class cricket.
