= Veron Edwards =

Antiguan cricketer (born 1950)

Personal information
- Born: 7 July 1950 (age 76); Antigua
- Source: Cricinfo, 24 November 2020

Veron Edwards (born 7 July 1950) is an Antiguan cricketer. He played in seven first-class matches for the Leeward Islands from 1964 to 1973.

== See also ==
- List of Leeward Islands first-class cricketers
