= Raphael Wallace =

Nevisian cricketer

Personal information
- Full name: Raphael Hugh Oswald Wallace
- Born: 29 May 1957 (age 69); Government Road, Charlestown, Nevis
- Nickname: "Raffie"
- Batting: Right-handed
- Bowling: Right-arm fast-medium
- Role: Bowler

Domestic team information
- Years: Team
- 1980–1985: Leeward Islands

Career statistics
Competition	FC	LA
Matches	1	2
Runs scored	6	n/a
Batting average	n/a	n/a
100s/50s	0/0	n/a
Top score	4*	n/a
Balls bowled	104	116
Wickets	2	3
Bowling average	25.00	25.00
5 wickets in innings	0	0
10 wickets in match	0	n/a
Best bowling	2/33	2/48
Catches/stumpings	0/-	0/-
- Source: CricketArchive, 24 February 2013

Raphael Hugh Oswald Wallace (born 29 May 1957) is a former Nevisian cricketer who played several matches with the Leeward Islands in West Indian domestic cricket. From Charlestown, the island's capital and largest town, Wallace regularly represented Nevis in inter-island matches, playing from the late 1970s through to the late 1980s. A right-arm fast bowler, he made his first-class debut for the Leewards during the 1979–80 season, in the semi-annual matches against the Windward Islands. In the match, played at the Antigua Recreation Ground, Wallace took 2/33 in the Windwards' first innings, but in the second innings went wicketless, also scoring six runs without losing his wicket. He did not play any further matches at first-class level, but several seasons later played twice for the team in the limited-overs Geddes Grant/Harrison Line Trophy. Wallace took a single wicket in a match against Barbados in February 1984, and two wickets against the same team just over a year later, opening the bowling with Conrad Bartlette.

His brother, Leon Claxton, also played representative cricket for Nevis. His son, Philo Wallace, played for the Leeward Islands under-age teams, before he was killed by a police constable in October 2015.
