= Juari Edwards =

Antiguan cricketer (born 1982)

Personal information
- Born: 28 September 1982 (age 44)
- Source: Cricinfo, 24 November 2020

Juari Edwards (born 28 September 1982) is an Antiguan cricketer. He played in two Twenty20 matches for Antigua and Barbuda in 2008, and one first-class match for the Leeward Islands in 2011.

== See also ==
- List of Leeward Islands first-class cricketers
