= Leroy Coury =

Kittitian cricketer (died 2012)

Personal information
- Born: St Kitts
- Died: 22 October 2012
- Source: Cricinfo, 24 November 2020

Leroy Arthur Coury (died 22 October 2012) was a Kittitian cricketer and businessman of Lebanese descent. He played in seven first-class matches for the Leeward Islands from 1964 to 1970.

== See also ==
- List of Leeward Islands first-class cricketers
