= Michael Mills (West Indian cricketer) =

Nevisian cricketer (born 1967)

Personal information
- Born: 11 November 1967 (age 59); Nevis
- Source: Cricinfo, 24 November 2020

Michael Mills (born 11 November 1967) is a Nevisian cricketer. He played in one List A and two first-class matches for the Leeward Islands in 1996/97 and 2001/02.

== See also ==
- List of Leeward Islands first-class cricketers
