= Joseph Williams (Nevisian cricketer) =

Nevisian cricketer (born 1989)

Personal information
- Full name: Joseph Junior Williams
- Born: 15 December 1989 (age 36); Nevis
- Batting: Right-handed
- Bowling: Slow left-arm orthodox
- Role: Bowler

Domestic team information
- Years: Team
- 2008: Nevis

Career statistics
Competition	T20
Matches	2
Runs scored	–
Batting average	–
100s/50s	–
Top score	–
Balls bowled	30
Wickets	0
Bowling average	–
5 wickets in innings	–
10 wickets in match	–
Best bowling	–
Catches/stumpings	0/–
- Source: CricketArchive, 5 June 2013

Joseph Junior Williams (born 15 December 1989) is a Nevisian cricketer who has played two Twenty20 matches for Nevis. Born on the island, Williams represented the Leeward Islands under-15 team at the 2004–05 West Indies Under-15 Tournament, playing five matches as a left-arm orthodox spinner. Aged 18, he went on to play both matches for Nevis in the 2008 edition of the Stanford 20/20 competition, which featured 21 teams from around the Caribbean region. In the first match, against Montserrat, Williams conceded 21 runs from his two overs without taking a wicket, and in the second match, against Jamaica, he conceded 17 runs from three overs, again without taking a wicket. Williams did not get an opportunity to bat in either match, which were to be the last two matches played by Nevis at Twenty20 level. However, later in 2008, he did go on to play two matches against the touring Marylebone Cricket Club (MCC), for a Nevis under-19 side and a Nevis "Pro XI".

== See also ==
- List of Nevis Twenty20 cricketers
