= Kenneth Quinn (cricketer) =

Antiguan cricketer (born 1971)

Personal information
- Born: 30 May 1971 (age 55); Antigua
- Source: Cricinfo, 24 November 2020

Kenneth Quinn (born 30 May 1971) is an Antiguan cricketer. He played in nineteen first-class and four List A matches for Colombo Cricket Club and the Leeward Islands from 1993 to 1999.

== See also ==
- List of Leeward Islands first-class cricketers
