= Harwood Williams =

Kittitian cricketer

Personal information
- Full name: Harwood Wycum Williams
- Born: 17 January 1970 (age 56); Saint Kitts
- Batting: Right-handed
- Bowling: Right-arm medium
- Role: All-rounder

Domestic team information
- Years: Team
- 1994–1996: Leeward Islands
- Source: CricketArchive, 6 June 2013

Harwood Wycum Williams (born 17 January 1970) is a former Kittitian cricketer who played several matches for the Leeward Islands during the 1990s. He was a right-handed all-rounder bowling medium pace.

Born on Saint Kitts, Williams played for the Leeward Islands under-19 team at both the 1988 and 1989 West Indies Youth Championships, and finished second in the team's batting averages and run aggregates in the latter year. A right-handed middle-order batsman, he made his senior debut for the Leeward Islands during the 1993–94 season of the limited-overs Geddes Grant Shield, playing two matches in January 1994. In the second of these matches, played against the Windward Islands at Grove Park, Charlestown, Williams scored 31 not out batting seventh, remaining unbeaten at the close of innings.

Williams made his first-class debut the following month, for the Leewards against the touring English team. He scored 14 and 25 runs in the first and second innings, respectively, with the Leewards losing by seven wickets. Williams' next matches for the team did not come until the 1995–96 season of the Red Stripe Cup, which were to be his last at first-class level. His next match at a major level did not come for a further ten years, when he was selected to appear for the Saint Kitts national team in the inaugural 2006 edition of the Stanford 20/20, which featured 21 teams from around the Caribbean region. In the match, played against Nevis, he scored only a single run in Saint Kitts' first innings, with the team losing by seven wickets to be knocked out of the tournament in the first round.

== See also ==
- List of Leeward Islands first-class cricketers
