= Percy Daniel =

Kittitian cricketer (born 1962)

Personal information
- Born: 19 January 1962 (age 64); St Kitts
- Source: Cricinfo, 24 November 2020

Percy Daniel (born 19 January 1962) is a Kittitian cricketer. He played in one first-class match for the Leeward Islands in 1991/92.

== See also ==
- List of Leeward Islands first-class cricketers
