= Everod Carter =

Antiguan cricketer (born 1947)

Personal information
- Born: 14 August 1947 (age 79); Antigua
- Source: Cricinfo, 24 November 2020

Everod Carter (born 14 August 1947) is an Antiguan cricketer. He played in three first-class matches for the Leeward Islands from 1971 to 1975.

== See also ==
- List of Leeward Islands first-class cricketers
