= Carnforth Cricket Club =

Carnforth Cricket Club is based in the North-West of England and play their home games at Lodge Quarry, Carnforth.

They have 3 teams in total, with the 1st and 2nd XI playing in the Northern Premier League, and the 3rd XI playing in The Westmorland League.

== Professionals ==
Year	Professional
2007	Omari Banks
2008	Ryan Bailey
2009	Gareth Pedder (Gareth known for his nights out in duke of lancaster with mick preston, gareth is a very experienced tennis ball cricket player with over 450 wickets and 7000 runs with top score off 302 and bowling figures of 8 for 14 and also 3 catches and 17 1 hand 1 bounce catches.)

| 2012 | Glenn Russell has become the new professional for this season in Div 4 of the Westmorland Cricket League, he has a brilliant eye and when he connects it goes miles, normally over cow corner.|}

|2017 |Owen Russell has become the pro for Carnforth 3rd XI in Div 5 of the Westmorland Cricket League. He is the son of Glenn Russell and has batted a total of 50 overs this season with a top score of 8. This season he has had a total of 32 runs, 1 wicket and 1 catch and is an amazing fielder.|}

== 1st XI Players 2009 ==
New captain for the 2009 season is Darren Moore, who has returned from his short spell with Netherfield CC.
