= Winston Davis (Kittitian cricketer) =

Kittitian cricketer (born 1961)

Personal information
- Born: 14 September 1961 (age 65); St Kitts
- Source: Cricinfo, 24 November 2020

Winston Davis (born 14 September 1961) is a Kittitian cricketer. He played in five first-class and two List A matches for the Leeward Islands in 1991/92 and 1992/93.

== See also ==
- List of Leeward Islands first-class cricketers
