= Guy Yearwood =

Antiguan cricketer (born 1948)

Personal information
- Born: 9 November 1948 (age 78); Antigua
- Source: Cricinfo, 24 November 2020

Guy Yearwood (born 9 November 1948) is an Antiguan cricketer. He played in eight first-class matches for the Leeward Islands from 1970 to 1975.

== See also ==
- List of Leeward Islands first-class cricketers
