= Recaldo Bassue =

Kittitian cricketer (born 1965)

Personal information
- Born: 10 October 1965 (age 61); St Kitts
- Source: Cricinfo, 24 November 2020

Recaldo Bassue (born 10 October 1965) is a Kittitian cricketer. He played in one List A and two first-class matches for the Leeward Islands in 1989/90.

== See also ==
- List of Leeward Islands first-class cricketers
