= Daynason Browne =

Nevisian cricketer (born 1986)

Personal information
- Born: 6 May 1986 (age 40); Nevis
- Source: Cricinfo, 24 November 2020

Daynason Browne (born 6 May 1986) is a Nevisian cricketer. He played in three Twenty20 matches for the Nevis Cricket Team in 2006 and 2008, and in one first-class match for the Leeward Islands in 2010.

== See also ==
- List of Nevis Twenty20 cricketers
- List of Leeward Islands first-class cricketers
