= Lennie Lake =

Kittitian cricketer (born 1967)

Personal information
- Born: 25 May 1967 (age 59); St Kitts
- Source: Cricinfo, 24 November 2020

Lennie Lake (born 25 May 1967) is a Kittitian cricketer. He played in two first-class and seven List A matches for the Leeward Islands from 1992 to 1995.

== See also ==
- List of Leeward Islands first-class cricketers
