= William Duberry =

Montserratian cricketer (born 1944)

Personal information
- Full name: William Duberry
- Born: 15 January 1944 (age 82); Montserrat
- Batting: Unknown
- Bowling: Unknown

Domestic team information
- Years: Team
- 1966/67–1973: Leeward Islands
- 1974–1977: Montserrat

Career statistics
Competition	First-class
Matches	3
Runs scored	26
Batting average	6.50
100s/50s	–/–
Top score	13*
Balls bowled	252
Wickets	2
Bowling average	80.50
5 wickets in innings	–
10 wickets in match	–
Best bowling	2/41
Catches/stumpings	–/–
- Source: Cricinfo, 14 October 2012

William Duberry (born 15 January 1944) is a former West Indian cricketer. Duberry's batting and bowling styles are unknown. He was born on Montserrat.

Duberry made his first-class debut for the Leeward Islands against Barbados in the 1966/67 Shell Shield at Warner Park, St Kitts. This appearance, which came in February 1967, made him the first Montserratian to play first-class cricket (one month before Vendol Moore's first-class debut). He made two further first-class appearances for the Leeward Islands, against the Marylebone Cricket Club in 1968 at the Antigua Recreation Ground, St John's, and against the Windward Islands in 1973 at the Arnos Vale Ground, Kingstown. In his three first-class matches, he scored 26 runs at an average of 6.50, with a high score of 13 not out. With the ball, he took 2 wickets at a bowling average of 80.50, with best figures of 2/41. His first recorded appearance for Montserrat came against Antigua in the 1974 Hesketh Bell Shield. His last recorded appearance for Montserrat came against Nevis in the 1977 Heineken Challenge Trophy.
