= Charles Wilkin (cricketer) =

Kittitian cricketer (born 1949)

Personal information
- Born: 9 January 1949 (age 77); St Kitts
- Source: Cricinfo, 24 November 2020

Charles Wilkin (born 9 January 1949) is a Kittitian cricketer. He played in one List A and nineteen first-class matches for the Leeward Islands from 1969 to 1977.

== See also ==
- List of Leeward Islands first-class cricketers
