= Shirlon Williams =

West Indian cricketer (born 1959)

Personal information
- Full name: Shirlon Ian Williams
- Born: 7 November 1959 (age 67); Saint Kitts
- Batting: Right-handed
- Role: Wicket-keeper
- Relatives: Winston Williams (brother)

Domestic team information
- Years: Team
- 1980–1986: Leeward Islands
- 1980–1981: Combined Islands
- Source: CricketArchive, 1 January 2016

Shirlon Ian Williams (born 7 November 1959) is a former Kittitian cricketer who played for the Leeward Islands and Combined Islands in West Indian domestic cricket. He was a wicket-keeper who batted right-handed.

Williams made his first-class debut for the Leewards in March 1980, playing in a friendly fixture against the Windward Islands. In the second innings of the match, he scored 127 runs from seventh in the batting order, what was to be his highest first-class score. Williams made his Shell Shield debut the following month, for the Combined Islands against Barbados. After the 1980–81 season, he played exclusively for the Leewards, which had been invited to compete in the Shell Shield as a separate team. Williams made his only other first-class century during the 1982–83 Shell Shield season, making 120 against Trinidad and Tobago. He and countryman Victor Eddy put on 158 runs for the sixth wicket, a Leeward Islands record. Williams last played for the Leewards in the final of the 1985–86 Geddes Grant/Harrison Line Trophy, a limited-overs competition. His older brother, Winston Williams, also played first-class cricket for the Leewards as a wicket-keeper, but the pair never played together at that level.
