= Jimmy Harris =

Jimmy Harris may refer to:

== Sports ==
- Jimmy Harris (cornerback) (born 1946), former American football cornerback for the Washington Redskins and Cincinnati Bengals
- Jimmy Harris (defensive back) (1934–2011), former American football defensive back for the Philadelphia Eagles, Los Angeles Rams, and Dallas Cowboys
- Jimmy Harris (footballer, born 1907) (1907–?), English footballer who played for West Ham United and Southampton
- Jimmy Harris (footballer, born 1933) (1933–2022), English footballer who played for Everton, Birmingham City and Oldham Athletic

== Others ==
- Jimmy Harris (politician), politician from New Orleans, Louisiana
- Jimmy Harris (EastEnders), fictional character in the UK soap opera EastEnders

== See also ==
- James Harris (disambiguation)
