= Lyndel Richardson =

Anguillan cricketer (born 1986)

Personal information
- Full name: Lyndel Rashad Richardson
- Born: 7 May 1986 (age 40); Anguilla
- Batting: Right-handed
- Bowling: Right-arm medium
- Role: Batsman

Domestic team information
- Years: Team
- 2006–present: Anguilla
- 2013–present: Leeward Islands
- Source: CricInfo, 27 March 2015

Lyndel Rashad Richardson (born 7 May 1986) is an Anguillan cricketer and current member of the Leeward Islands cricket team.

== Playing career ==
He made his debut for Anguilla during the 2006 Stanford 20/20 Tournament in Antigua and played his first match for the Leeward Islands in a Regional Super50 game against the CCC on March 11, 2013. He made his first-class debut for the Leeward Islands later that same month against Jamaica. Richardson currently plays as an opening batsman for the first-class Leeward Islands team.
