= Gavin Williams (cricketer) =

Antiguan cricketer (born 1984)

Personal information
- Full name: Gavin Anjez Williams
- Born: 18 November 1984 (age 41); Bolands, Antigua
- Batting: Right-handed
- Bowling: Right-arm medium

Domestic team information
- Years: Team
- 2010–2012: Leeward Islands
- Source: CricketArchive, 14 January 2016

Gavin Anjez Williams (born 18 November 1984) is an Antiguan cricketer who has played for the Leeward Islands in West Indian domestic cricket.

Williams played a single match for the Antigua and Barbuda national team at the 2008 Stanford 20/20 tournament, against the U.S. Virgin Islands. His debut for the Leewards came in February 2010, against the Windward Islands in the 2009–10 Regional Four Day Competition. Against the same team during the 2010–11 season, Williams scored a maiden first-class century, 114 runs from 193 balls. He last played for the Leewards in March 2012, in the 2011–12 Regional Four Day Competition.
