= Oscar Williams (cricketer) =

Antiguan cricketer

Personal information
- Born: 1932 (age 93–94); Antigua
- Source: Cricinfo, 24 November 2020

Oscar Williams (born 1932) is an Antiguan cricketer. He played in two first-class matches for the Leeward Islands in 1958/59 and 1959/60.

== See also ==
- List of Leeward Islands first-class cricketers
