= Jeffers Warrington =

Dominica cricketer (born 1943)

Personal information
- Born: 19 November 1943 (age 82); Dominica
- Source: Cricinfo, 24 November 2020

Jeffers Warrington (born 19 November 1943) is a Dominica cricketer. He played in thirteen first-class matches for the Leeward Islands from 1968 to 1971.

== See also ==
- List of Leeward Islands first-class cricketers
