= Lennox Cooper =

Montserratian cricketer

Personal information
- Full name: Lennox Cooper
- Born: Montserrat
- Batting: Unknown
- Bowling: Right-arm fast

Domestic team information
- Years: Team
- 1970/71: Leeward Islands
- 1970–1971: Montserrat

Career statistics
| Competition | First-class |
|---|---|
| Matches | 1 |
| Runs scored | 3 |
| Batting average | – |
| 100s/50s | –/– |
| Top score | 3* |
| Balls bowled | 114 |
| Wickets | 1 |
| Bowling average | 47.00 |
| 5 wickets in innings | – |
| 10 wickets in match | – |
| Best bowling | 1/32 |
| Catches/stumpings | 1/– |
- Source: Cricinfo, 14 October 2012

Lennox Cooper (date of birth unknown) is a former West Indian cricketer. Cooper's batting style is unknown, though it is known he bowled right-arm fast. He was born on Montserrat.

Cooper first played for Montserrat against St Kitts in the 1970 Hesketh Bell Shield. In 1971, he made a single first-class appearance for the Leeward Islands against the Windward Islands at Warner Park, St Kitts. Batting first, the Windward Islands were dismissed for 122, with Cooper bowling four wicketless overs which conceded 15 runs. In reply, the Leeward Islands made 315 all out in their first-innings, with Cooper ending the innings unbeaten on 3. Responding in their second-innings, the Windward Islands were dismissed for 153, with Cooper taking a single wicket in the innings, that of Windward Islands captain Irvine Shillingford, finishing with figures of 1/32 from fifteen overs. The Leeward Islands won the match by the margin of an innings and 40 runs. He played three minor matches for Montserrat in 1971, before emigrating to Canada.
