= Daniella Jeffry-Pilot =

Historian from Saint Martin

Daniella Jeffry-Pilot (1941–2019) was a writer, teacher and historian from Saint Martin, who was the founder of the United Saint-Martin Movement. She was awarded the Ordre des Palmes Académiques by the French government for her activism.

== Biography ==
Jeffry-Pilot was born in 1941 in Marigot and went to school at the Lycée Gerville-Réache in Basse-Terre in Guadeloupe. She graduated in 1965 from the University of Paris-La Sorbonne with a BA in English and in 1971 she graduated from the University of Antananarivo in Madagascar, with a Higher Certificate in Education and returned to Saint Martin. From 1974 she taught English and French at the Collège of Marigot. She also translated the works of archaeologist Jay Haviser and writer George Lamming to French for books by House of Nehesi Publishers (HNP).

In 1988 she founded the United Saint-Martin Movement, which campaigned for the political unification of the island. In 1990 she was appointed president of the Saint-Martin People's Consensus by Mayor Albert Fleming. She retired from the Collège of Marigot in 2000. From 2001 to 2007 she was a member of the Territorial Council. She died in 2019.

== Awards ==
- Ordre des Palmes Académiques

== Selected works ==
- 1963 – A Landmark Year in St. Martin, A Retrospective Look (English, French edition), (House of Nehesi Publishers, 2003)
- 1963 – A Landmark Year in St. Martin, (Xlibris, 2011)
- Saint-Martin : stabilisation sociétale dans dans la Caraïbe francaise, (L'Harmattan, 2010)
