= Omari Banks =

West Indian cricketer

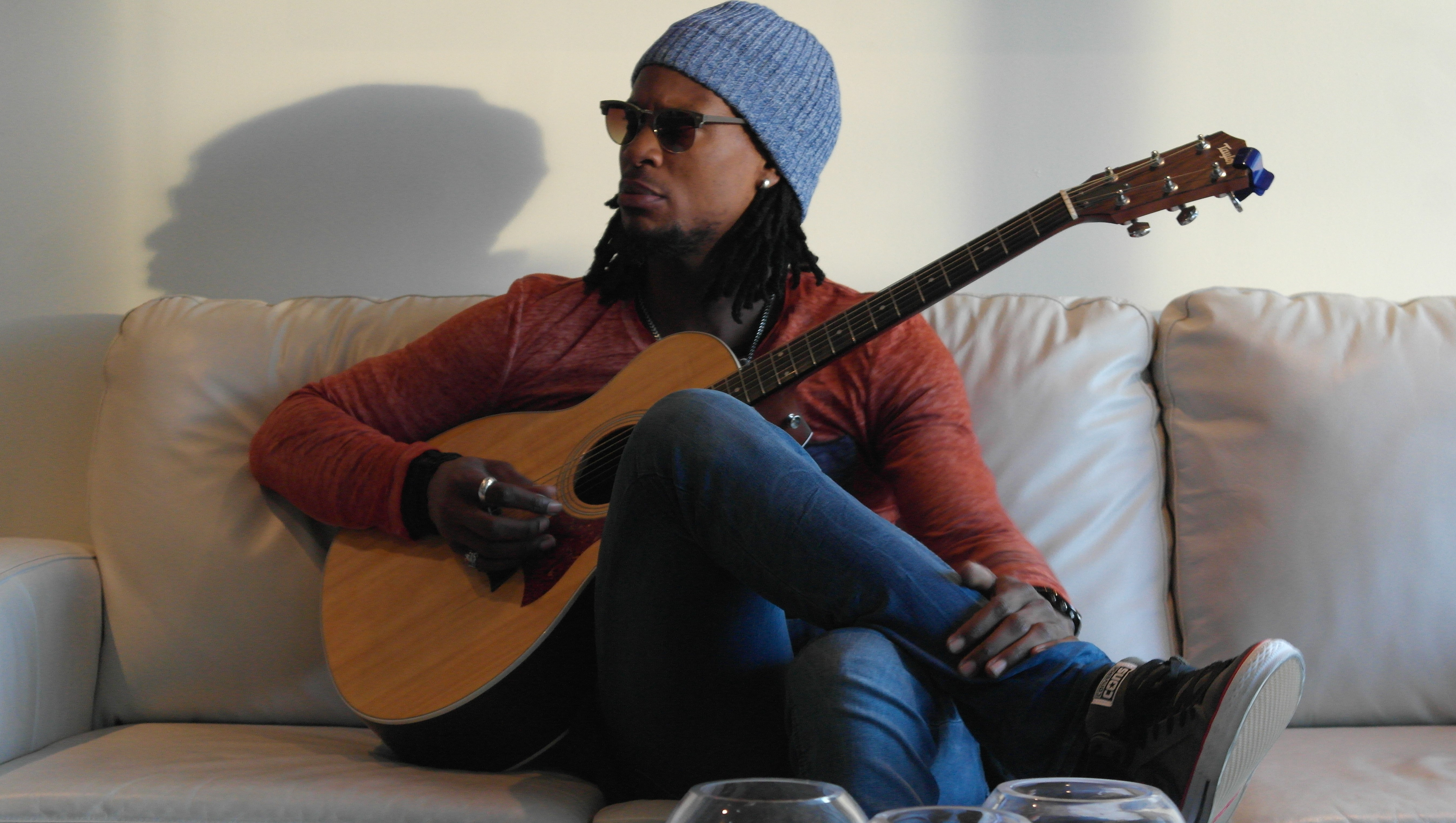
- Omari Banks in 2014

Personal information
- Full name: Omari Ahmed Clement Banks
- Born: 17 July 1982 (age 44); Anguilla
- Nickname: Banko
- Height: 6 ft 5 in (1.96 m)
- Batting: Right-handed
- Bowling: Right-arm off break
- Role: All-rounder

International information
- National side: West Indies (2003-2005)
- Test debut (cap 250): 1 May 2003 v Australia
- Last Test: 22 July 2005 v Sri Lanka
- ODI debut (cap 112): 17 May 2003 v Australia
- Last ODI: 7 August 2005 v India

Domestic team information
- Years: Team
- 2000–2011: Leeward Islands
- 2001: Leicestershire
- 2007–2011: Anguilla
- 2008–2009: Somerset

Career statistics
Competition	Test	ODI	FC	LA
Matches	10	5	80	73
Runs scored	318	83	2,757	1,228
Batting average	26.50	16.60	25.52	28.55
100s/50s	0/1	0/0	2/16	0/9
Top score	50*	33	108	77*
Balls bowled	2,401	270	14,507	3,037
Wickets	28	7	204	81
Bowling average	48.82	27.00	37.06	27.66
5 wickets in innings	0	0	8	0
10 wickets in match	0	0	2	0
Best bowling	4/87	2/24	7/41	4/23
Catches/stumpings	6/–	0/–	46/–	16/0
- Source: ESPNcricinfo, 3 June 2017

Omari Ahmed Clement Banks (born 17 July 1982) is an Anguillan musician and former cricketer, who appeared in 10 Test matches for the West Indies, as well as domestic matches for the Leeward Islands. In 2011, Banks began to pursue his musical career professionally and has been less involved in playing regional cricket, and officially retired from cricket on 31 January 2012.

== Cricket career ==
=== Test career ===
The son of noted Anguillian musician Bankie Banx, he became the first Anguillian to play Test cricket in May 2003. During his first innings, despite picking up three wickets, he conceded 204 runs in 40 overs, which was at the time the most runs conceded by a Test debutant, although it has since been surpassed by Jason Krejza. His lower order batting was confident and assured, and he played a significant part in the highest successful fourth-innings chase in Test history, remaining 47 not out in West Indies 418 for 7 against Australia at the Antigua Recreation Ground in 2003.

=== Domestic career ===
Banks played for the Leeward Islands from 2000 to 2011. During the 2001 season, Banks played at Leicester. He later played for Carnforth Cricket Club, in the summer of 2006 in Northern Premier League. He averaged 54.6 with the bat, whilst taking 27 wickets at a brief spell at the Lancashire club, before being called up to the West Indies 'A' team on the tour of England. In October 2007 he was signed by Somerset; due to Anguilla's status as a British overseas territory, he does not count as an overseas player.

On 9 July 2009 he was suspended for 12 days by the England and Wales Cricket Board disciplinary panel for ball tampering, he was found guilty of running his thumb and fingernails over the ball during Somerset's 2nd XI match against Essex at Vale on 1 July 2009. Somerset released the all-rounder after the close of the 2009 season, with Brian Rose stating "He hasn't had the performances to justify another contract."

Banks officially retired from professional cricket on 25 January 2012 to focus on his musical career.

== Music career ==
Banks' first single "Move On" was released on iTunes on 17 January 2012 as part of Bankie Banx's album Just Cool. His upcoming album is currently untitled and expected to be released in Spring 2012. One of the first singles on his album is "Move On" a semi-biographical song about his transition from cricket to music. Banks explained to Basil Walters of the Jamaica Observer, "In life we tend to go through different ups and downs, but the most important thing is that we move on and grow from it. That's what the song is about really. I wrote the song and the music, but on the track itself it has a number of big name musicians like Junior Jazz, Glen Browne, Robbie Lyn and Sly Dunbar. Steven Stanley produced the track."

Omari Banks and his band Eleven performed at the Miss Anguilla pageant in August 2011 as part of Anguilla's Summer Festival.

Even as a cricketer Banks made various radio and television appearances and discussed his passion for music and the hope of one day pursuing music full-time. He appeared on the syndicated Caribbean entertainment program Caribbean Soundtrack in summer 2010 His 2014 music video "No Point to Prove" featured Peetah Morgan of the group Morgan Heritage.

Omari released his latest album Move On (Deluxe Edition) on 17 February 2015. He recently embarked on a tour of Toronto, Ontario, Canada, to promote new music which will be released in late 2015.

In 2015, he toured Europe with Morgan Heritage. In 2016, he released the single "System Set", featuring Duane Stephenson.

Omari Banks won Best new artist 2017 by Irie Jam Radio online awards and was nominated for 2017 artist of the year at Linkage Radio awards. In May 2018, Omari Banks premiered Reggae Summertime video in India.
