= James Harris (Kittitian cricketer) =

Kittitian cricketer (born 1954)

Personal information
- Born: 13 March 1954 (age 72); St Kitts
- Source: Cricinfo, 24 November 2020

James Harris (born 13 March 1954) is a Kittitian cricketer. He played in nineteen first-class and eleven List A matches for the Leeward Islands from 1977 to 1984.

== See also ==
- List of Leeward Islands first-class cricketers
