= Merlin Liburd =

Nevisian cricketer (born 1969)

Personal information
- Born: 15 December 1969 (age 56); Nevis
- Source: Cricinfo, 24 November 2020

Merlin Liburd (born 15 November 1969) is a Nevisian former cricketer. He played in twelve first-class and sixteen List A matches for the Leeward Islands from 1994 to 1999.

== See also ==
- List of Leeward Islands first-class cricketers
