= Stephen Liburd =

Kittitian cricketer (born 1955)

Personal information
- Born: 11 February 1955 (age 71); St Kitts
- Source: Cricinfo, 24 November 2020

Stephen Liburd (born 11 February 1955) is a former cricketer from Saint Kitts in the West Indies. He played in four first-class and three List A matches for the Leeward Islands from 1977 to 2011.

== See also ==
- List of Leeward Islands first-class cricketers
