= James Harris (cricketer, born 1838) =

English soldier and cricketer

James Edward Harris (1 October 1838 – 30 November 1925) was an English soldier and a cricketer who played in four important matches for Cambridge University in 1859. He was born and also died at Sharnford, Leicestershire.

Harris's top-class cricket career was largely confined to 1859, when he appeared as a batsman and bowler of unknown style in several non-first-class matches as well as in Cambridge's four first-class fixtures, which included the University match. No great indication of his merits in either batting or bowling can be gained, as his bowling figures are incomplete and he never took more than two wickets in an innings, and his position in the batting order varied between the tail-end and occasional outings as an opening batsman.

== Career outside cricket ==
Educated at Sheffield Collegiate School and then privately at home in Sharnford, Harris was an undergraduate at Gonville and Caius College, Cambridge, graduating in 1860. From university, Harris joined the British Army as an officer in the 12th Regiment; he became a lieutenant in 1862, a captain in 1868, a major in 1881, a lieutenant-colonel in 1886 and a full colonel in 1890. His final appointment on half-pay was as Assistant Adjutant-General at the Cape of Good Hope, from which he retired in 1894. In 1898 he is reported as living at Earsham Hall, Norfolk (but which is near to Bungay, Suffolk), but he later retired to his home county of Leicestershire where he became a Justice of the Peace and a Deputy Lieutenant.

He died aged 87 in Sharnford, near Hinckley, Leicestershire.
