= Lanville Harrigan =

Anguillan cricketer

Personal information
- Full name: Lanville Allonie Harrigan
- Born: 26 September 1967 (age 59); Anguilla
- Batting: Right-handed
- Bowling: Right-arm off spin

Domestic team information
- Years: Team
- 1989–1998: Leeward Islands
- 2002: Rest of Leeward Islands
- Source: CricketArchive, 1 January 2016

Lanville Allonie Harrigan (born 26 September 1967) is a former Anguillan cricketer who played for the Leeward Islands in West Indian domestic cricket. He was a right-handed opening batsman.

Harrigan made his first-class debut for the Leewards during the 1988–89 Red Stripe Cup, against Barbados. He became only the third Anguillan to play first-class cricket, after Cardigan Connor and Eustace Proctor, and the second after Proctor to play for the Leewards. Against Jamaica during the 1992–93 Red Stripe Cup, Harrigan scored a maiden first-class half-century, making 57 opening the batting with Stuart Williams. The next season, he scored 255 runs from five matches, third only to Stuart Williams and Keith Arthurton amongst Leewards batsmen.

Against Trinidad and Tobago in the final the 1995–96 Red Stripe Cup, Harrigan made what was to be his highest first-class score, 67 runs. Despite having a lower batting average in limited-overs cricket than in the longer form of the game, he twice surpassed his first-class best in one-day matches, scoring 68 against Barbados during the 1993–94 season and 85 against Jamaica during the 1997–98 season. Harrigan's final matches for the Leewards were played during the 1997–98 season, but he returned to topflight West Indian cricket for the 2002–03 Red Stripe Bowl, representing the Rest of Leeward Islands team that played during the few seasons where Antigua and Barbuda fielded a separate side. Harrigan was 34 at the time of his last List A appearances.
