= Kelbert Walters =

Anguillian cricketer (born 1990)

Personal information
- Full name: Kelbert Orlando Waters
- Born: 4 December 1990 (age 35); Anguilla
- Batting: Right-handed
- Bowling: Right-arm fast medium
- Role: Bowler

Domestic team information
- Years: Team
- 2006–present: Anguilla
- 2011–present: Leeward Islands
- Source: Cricinfo, 8 March 2015

Kelbert Orlando Walters (born December 4, 1990) is an Anguillan cricketer and current member of the Leeward Islands cricket team.

== Playing career ==
He made his debut for Anguilla at the 2006 Stanford 20/20 Tournament in Antigua and made his first appearance for the Leeward Islands in a first class game against Barbados on March 18, 2011. Walters is also a former member of the West Indies Under-19 cricket team.
