= McChesney Simon =

Antiguan cricketer (born 1960)

Personal information
- Born: 20 September 1960 (age 66); Antigua
- Source: Cricinfo, 24 November 2020

McChesney Simon (born 20 September 1960) is an Antiguan cricketer. He played in eight first-class and four List A matches for the Leeward Islands from 1985 to 1992.

== See also ==
- List of Leeward Islands first-class cricketers
