= Noel Guishard =

West Indian cricketer (born 1957)

Personal information
- Full name: Noel Calvin Guishard
- Born: 6 December 1957 (age 68)
- Batting: Right-handed
- Bowling: Right-arm off spin
- Role: All-rounder

Domestic team information
- Years: Team
- 1981–1992: Leeward Islands
- 1981: Combined Islands
- Source: CricketArchive, 28 December 2015

Noel Calvin Guishard (born 6 December 1957) is a former Kittitian cricketer who played for the Leeward Islands and the Combined Islands in West Indian domestic cricket. He was a right-handed all-rounder who bowled off spin.

Guishard made his first-class debut in January 1981, playing for the Leewards in what was then the annual fixture against the Windward Islands. On debut, he took 2/42 and 5/50, helping his side to a seven-wicket victory. A few weeks later, Guishard made his debut for the Combined Islands in the 1980–81 Shell Shield season, the final season in which the Leewards and Windwards did not field separate teams. After that, he played exclusively for the Leewards. During the 1981–82 season, Guishard took what were to be his best first-class bowling figures, 6/33 against the Windwards. His highest first-class score was an innings of 85 made against Barbados during the 1983–84 season. Guishard was a regular in the Leewards team throughout the 1980s and into the early 1990s, playing his final matches during the 1991–92 season, aged 34. He finished with a first-class batting average of 22.84, making seven half-centuries in total, and a first-class bowling average of 29.68.
