= Chaka Hodge =

Anguillan cricketer (born 1982)

Personal information
- Full name: Chaka Jara Kwahme Hodge
- Born: 20 November 1982 (age 43); The Valley, Anguilla
- Batting: Right-handed
- Bowling: Right-arm off spin

Domestic team information
- Years: Team
- 2002: West Indies B
- 2002–2003: Rest of Leeward Islands
- 2003–2008: Leeward Islands
- Source: CricketArchive, 1 January 2016

Chaka Jara Kwahme Hodge (born 20 November 1982) is an Anguillan cricketer who has played for the Leeward Islands in West Indian domestic cricket, as well as several other teams. He is a right-arm off-spin bowler and right-handed lower-order batsman.

Hodge made his first-class debut in February 2002, playing for West Indies B in the 2001–02 Busta Cup. In the 2002–03 and 2003–04 Red Stripe Bowls, he represented the Rest of Leeward Islands side that was competing while Antigua and Barbuda briefly competed separately. Hodge's senior Leeward Islands debut came in the 2002–03 Carib Beer Cup, against India A. During the 2006–07 season, he recorded his only first-class five-wicket haul, taking 5/103 against Trinidad and Tobago. Hodge last played for the Leewards during the 2007–08 season, aged 25. In 2006 and 2008, he appeared for Anguilla in the Stanford 20/20, although his team was knocked out in the first round on both occasions. Hodge has also played several seasons in England, playing in the Second XI Championship in 2001 (for Leicestershire) and 2003 (for Hampshire).
