= Patrick Evanson =

Antiguan cricketer (1933–2021)

Personal information
- Born: 13 June 1933; Antigua
- Died: 27 November 2021 (aged 88)
- Source: Cricinfo, 24 November 2020

Patrick Evanson (13 June 1933 – 27 November 2021) was an Antiguan cricketer. He played in multiple first-class matches for the Leeward Islands in 1959/60. Evanson is known for introducing Vivian Richards to the sport of cricket and giving him his first bat. A graduate of the Antigua Grammar School, Evanson’s effect on the island can still be felt. Evanson died on 27 November 2021, at the age of 88.

== See also ==
- List of Leeward Islands first-class cricketers
