= James Franklin Harris =

American philosopher

James F. Harris
- Born: 1941 (age 84–85)

Education
- Education: Vanderbilt University (PhD)

Philosophical work
- Era: 21st-century philosophy
- Region: Western philosophy
- Institutions: College of William & Mary
- Main interests: philosophy of religion

James F. Harris (born 1941) is an American philosopher and Francis S. Haserot Emeritus Professor at College of William & Mary. He is known for his works on philosophy of religion.

== Books ==
- Against Relativism: A Philosophical Defense of Method (LaSalle, IL: Open Court Publishing Company,1992)
- Philosophical at 33 rpm: Themes of Classic Rock Music (LaSalle, IL: Open Court Publishing Company,1993)
- Analytic Philosophy of Religion (Dordrecht, The Netherlands: Kluwer Academic Publishers, 2002)
- The Ascent of Man: A Philosophy of Human Nature (New Brunswick, NJ: Transaction Publishers, 2010)
- The Serpentine Wall: The Winding Boundary between Church and State in the United States (New Brunswick, NJ: Transaction Publishers, 2013).
- Analyticity (ed.) (Chicago, IL: Quadrangle Books, 1970)
- Logic, God, and Metaphysics (ed.) (Dordrecht, The Netherlands: Kluwer Academic Publishers, 1992).
