= Bank of Montserrat =

Bank of Montserrat Limited
- Type: Unlisted public company
- Industry: Commercial Banking
- Genre: Financial Services
- Founder: Hensey Fenton
- Headquarters: Brades, Montserrat
- Key people: Dalton Lee, Chairman of the Board; Baldwin Taylor, General Manager
- Operating income: ▲US$4,065,799 (as at September 30, 2021)
- Net income: ▼US$508,323 (as at September 30, 2021)
- Total assets: ▲US$157,756,463 (as at September 30, 2021)
- Total equity: ▲US$16,062,096 (as at September 30, 2021)
- Website: www.bankofmontserrat.ms

The Bank of Montserrat Limited is the only community bank operating in the island of Montserrat. It was incorporated on February 22, 1988 by Hensey Fenton, and officially offered its banking services to the public on May 3, 1988.

== Ownership ==
The bank, which operates as an unlisted public company, is jointly owned by local investors and the Government of Montserrat. As of March 2018, the island's government owned approximately 63% of the bank's total outstanding stock. However, the government, under the Reuben Meade administration, had expressed its intentions to fully divest its ownership stake in the bank.

Bruce Farara, a local businessman, is currently the largest individual shareholder in the Bank of Montserrat Limited. As of March 2018, he owns a 3.10% stake in the bank. The heirs of John Osborne, the island's 3rd Chief Minister, also collectively own a 2.44% stake in the bank.

== Corporate affairs ==
=== Board of directors ===
Bank of Montserrat's board of directors consists of the following members:

- Dalton Lee, Chairman
- John E. Ryan, Director
- Bruce Farara, Director
- Duleep Cheddie, Director
- Beverly Mendes, Director
- Venita Cabey, Director
- Johanathan Johannes, Director
- Fitzroy Buffonge, Director
- John P. Osborne, Director
- Robert Frederick, Director
- Ivan Browne, Director
