= Taddy Arrindell =

Antiguan cricketer (born 1951)

Personal information
- Born: 1 January 1951 (age 75); Antigua
- Source: Cricinfo, 24 November 2020

Taddy Arrindell (born 1 January 1951) is an Antiguan cricketer. He played in three first-class and two List A matches for the Leeward Islands in 1976/77.

== See also ==
- List of Leeward Islands first-class cricketers
