= Conrad Bartlette =

Nevisian cricketer (born 1959)

Personal information
- Born: 26 August 1959 (age 67); Nevis
- Source: Cricinfo, 24 November 2020

Conrad Bartlette (born 26 August 1959) is a Nevisian cricketer. He played in three first-class and two List A matches for the Leeward Islands in 1984/85.

== See also ==
- List of Leeward Islands first-class cricketers
