= John Archibald (cricketer) =

Antiguan cricketer (born 1958)

Personal information
- Born: 17 May 1958 (age 68); Antigua
- Source: Cricinfo, 24 November 2020

John Archibald (born 17 May 1958) is an Antiguan cricketer. He played in four first-class matches for the Leeward Islands from 1977 to 1981.

== See also ==
- List of Leeward Islands first-class cricketers
