= Rhoda Arrindell =

Sint Maartener linguist and advocate

- Citizenship: Sint Maarten
- Education: University of the Virgin Islands; Syracuse University; University of the Netherlands Antilles
- Organizations: Independence for St Martin Foundation; One SXM Association

Rhoda Arrindell is a Sint Maartener linguist and advocate for the independence of Sint Maarten. St. Maarten is a territory of the Netherlands in the Caribbean.

== Biography ==
Arrindell received a Bachelor of Arts in linguistics from Syracuse University, a Master's in Education Administration from the University of the Virgin Islands, and a pre-law degree from the University of the Netherlands Antilles. She studied for her PhD at the University of Puerto Rico, Rio Piedras.

Arrindell was a senior editor of the House of Nehesi Publishers, contributing to several manuscripts including Where I See The Sun – Contemporary Poetry in Anguilla, an anthology of 43 Anguillan poets. Additionally, she wrote several chapters in a book of linguistics studies by Nicholas Faraclas.

Arrindell's first book, Language, Culture, and Identity in St. Martin was published by House of Nehesi Publishers in 2014. Building upon her PhD research, she discusses the unique and, in her opinion, often harmful way in which language is viewed within St. Maarten. Arrindell argues that because many St. Maarteners are insecure in their language, the country's identity is also insecure. Additionally, she claims that symbolic holdovers from the island's time as a Dutch territory such as its flag, anthem, and governance led to the preservation of the old colonial system and mindset. In 2015, she was invited to speak as a panelist at the 4th annual Anguilla Literary Festival about her recently released book.

Following the publication of her book, Arrindell became more involved in advocating for the independence of Sint Maarten from the Netherlands. In 2016, she was serving as secretary of the Independence for St Martin Foundation. On September 2 of that year, she addressed the Central Committee of Parliament on behalf of the foundation to call for a referendum on St. Maarten's independence and request that it be placed back on the United Nations list of non-self-governing territories. In 2022, on behalf of the One SXM Association, she submitted a draft resolution to parliament and again requested that parliament hold a referendum which asks: "Independence for St. Maarten: Yes or No?"

In December 2022, as head of the One SXM Association, Dr. Arrindell made international news when she appeared on CNN to discuss One SXM's rejection of the Netherlands' apology for slavery without reparations.
