= Steve Liburd =

West Indian cricketer (born 1985)

Steve Stuart Wayne Liburd (born 26 February 1985 in Basseterre, St Kitts) is a West Indian cricketer who played in the 2004 U-19 Cricket World Cup in Bangladesh. He plays first-class and List A cricket for the Leeward Islands.

Steve starred in the Stanford 20/20 as captain of St Kitts Tournament held in the Caribbean. In 2007 he was professional at Royton CC in the Central Lancashire League.
