= Ralston Otto =

Antiguan cricketer (1957–2023)

Personal information
- Born: 26 December 1957; Antigua
- Died: 14 July 2023 (aged 65); Antigua
- Batting: Right-handed
- Bowling: Right-arm off break
- Role: Batsman

Domestic team information
- Years: Team
- 1979/80–1989/90: Leeward Islands

Career statistics
Competition	First-class	List A
Matches	48	29
Runs scored	2,550	535
Batting average	34.00	26.75
100s/50s	6/12	0/4
Top score	165	55
Balls bowled	324	384
Wickets	2	10
Bowling average	77.50	33.50
5 wickets in innings	0	0
10 wickets in match	0	0
Best bowling	2/17	3/29
Catches/stumpings	42/–	9/–
- Source: CricketArchive, 14 November 2008

Ralston Malcolm Otto (26 December 1957 – 14 July 2023) was an Antiguan cricketer who played as a batsman for the Leeward Islands in the 1980s, and subsequently coached and managed the team. He managed the Antigua and Barbuda team that competed in the 2008 Stanford 20/20 tournament.

Ralston Otto was a cousin of former West Indies fast bowler Curtly Ambrose. He died from complications of Parkinson's disease on 14 July 2023, at the age of 65.
