= Vendol Moore =

West Indian cricketer

Personal information
- Full name: Vendol Moore
- Born: Montserrat
- Batting: Unknown
- Bowling: Unknown

Domestic team information
- Years: Team
- 1966/67–1972/73: Leeward Islands
- 1970–1978: Montserrat

Career statistics
Competition	First-class
Matches	2
Runs scored	25
Batting average	8.33
100s/50s	–/–
Top score	9
Balls bowled	36
Wickets	–
Bowling average	–
5 wickets in innings	–
10 wickets in match	–
Best bowling	–
Catches/stumpings	–/–
- Source: Cricinfo, 14 October 2012

Vendol Moore (date of birth unknown) is a former West Indian cricketer. Moore's batting and bowling styles are unknown. He was born on Montserrat.

Moore made his first-class debut for Leeward Islands against the Windward Islands in 1967 at Sturge Park, Plymouth. He made a second and final first-class appearance for the team against the touring Australians in 1973 at the Antigua Recreation Ground, St John's. His first recorded appearance for Montserrat came against St Kitts in the 1970 Hesketh Bell Shield. His last recorded appearance for Montserrat came against Antigua in the 1978 Heineken Challenge Trophy.
