= Donald Richards (cricketer) =

Antiguan cricketer (born 1942)

Personal information
- Born: 17 December 1942 (age 83); Antigua
- Source: Cricinfo, 24 November 2020

Donald Richards (born 17 December 1942) is an Antiguan cricketer. He played in five first-class matches for the Leeward Islands in 1968/69 and 1969/70.

== See also ==
- List of Leeward Islands first-class cricketers
