= Oris Fergus =

Montserratian cricketer

Personal information
- Full name: Oris Fergus
- Born: Montserrat
- Batting: Unknown
- Bowling: Unknown

Domestic team information
- Years: Team
- 1977/78: Leeward Islands
- 1971–1977: Montserrat

Career statistics
Competition	First-class
Matches	2
Runs scored	25
Batting average	12.50
100s/50s	–/–
Top score	17*
Balls bowled	108
Wickets	3
Bowling average	20.33
5 wickets in innings	–
10 wickets in match	–
Best bowling	2/20
Catches/stumpings	1/–
- Source: Cricinfo, 14 October 2012

Oris Fergus (date of birth unknown) is a former West Indian cricketer. Fergus' batting and bowling styles are unknown. He was born on Montserrat.

Fergus first played for Montserrat against St Kitts in the 1971 Hesketh Bell Shield. His last recorded match for the team came against Nevis in the 1977 Heineken Challenge Trophy. He later made two first-class appearances for Leeward Islands in 1978, with both matches coming against the Windward Islands. In his two matches, he scored 25 runs at an average of 12.50, with a high score of 17 not out. With the ball, he took 3 wickets at a bowling average of 20.33, with best figures of 2/20.
