= Saint Thomas Lowland Parish =

Coordinates: 17°10′24″N 62°36′19″W

Saint Thomas Lowland
- Parish
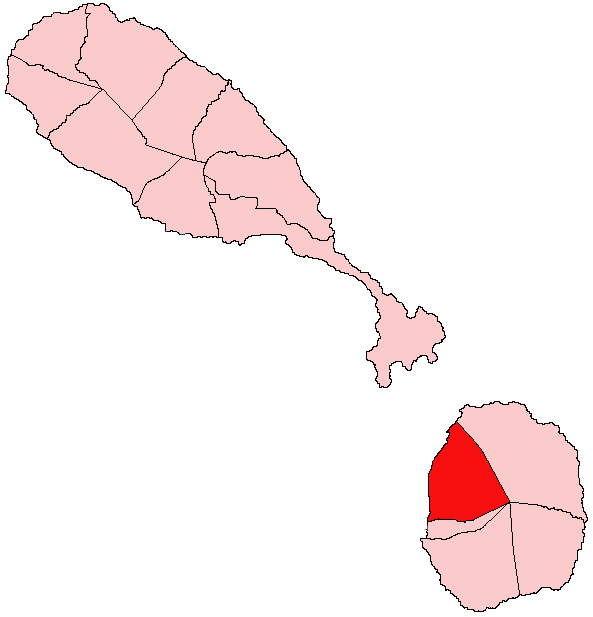
- Country: Saint Kitts and Nevis
- Capital: Cotton Ground

Area
  - Total: 18 km^{2} (6.9 sq mi)

Population (2011)
  - Total: 2,069
  - Density: 115/km^{2} (300/sq mi)

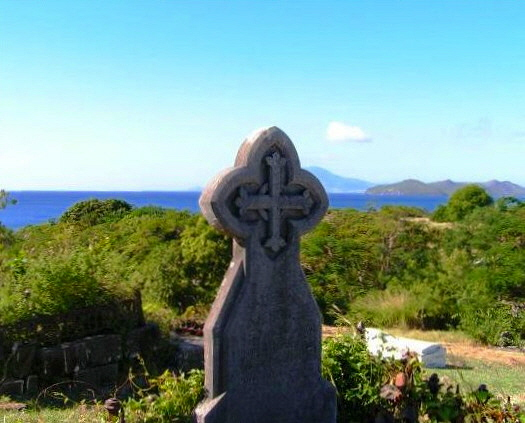
View from the churchyard of the parish church of St. Thomas, Nevis, Leeward Islands, West Indies. Visible in the distance is St. Kitts.

Saint Thomas Lowland is one of 5 Nevis parishes which are in turn part of the 14 administrative parishes that make up the Federation of Saint Kitts and Nevis. Leeward Islands, Lesser Antilles, West Indies.

The coast of this parish consists primarily of sand beaches, most notably the 3-mile long Pinney's Beach. Behind the sandy coastline are several small lagoons, including the freshwater lagoon of Nelson's Spring, which is next to the village of Cotton Ground. Some of the island's most important hotel developments are located in this area, including the Four Seasons Resort Nevis.

The small but steep hill at Cades Point is a weathered remnant of an ancient volcanic core. Further inland, many small villages and homes are located on the gently sloping landscape which gradually rises up towards Nevis Peak. Further inland as the elevation increases, the vegetation becomes more lush because of higher rainfall on the steeper slopes of Nevis Peak. The summit of the Peak is the Parish's interior land boundary.

== Settlements ==
The parish capital settlement is Cotton Ground. Other villages within the parish are Westbury, Barnes Ghaut and Jessups. There is also a small section of Craddock Road that is part of the parish, even though most of the Craddock Road community is in St. Paul's Parish.

Capital – Cotton Ground

Other Villages:

- Barnes Ghaut
- Jessups
- Stuarts
- Westbury

The southern end of the parish embraces the northern fringe of Charlestown, the capital of Nevis, including the Community Center (which was previously the cinema), the ruins of the Rest Haven Hotel (heavily damaged by Hurricane Hugo in 1989), and Pinney's Beach Hotel at the southern end of Pinney's Beach.

== Economy ==
Saint Thomas Lowland parish can arguably be viewed as the heart of the Nevis economy. This is because the island's main economic sector is tourism, and this parish is home to the island's largest hotel, the Four Seasons Resort, which is the largest single employer on the island, second only to the Government. The Four Seasons golf course is considered to be one of the best in the Caribbean. Several other hotel developments are also located on the coast of this parish.

== History ==
Saint Thomas was the first established Parish on Nevis, and was home to the first British settlement, Jamestown. Legend has it that Jamestown was lost in a tidal wave in the late 1680s, but there is no archeological evidence that would support that story. In any case the first settlement was abandoned, but St. Thomas' Church, on higher ground, remains.

== Future developments ==
The parish of Saint Thomas Lowland is the premier development area in Nevis at present, with a large hotel and golf course construction in progress, the most expensive such development in the Federation.

== Tourist attractions ==
- Museum of Nevis History
