= Eustace Proctor =

Anguillan cricketer (born 1965)

Personal information
- Full name: Eustace Jerome Proctor
- Born: 15 November 1965 (age 60); Anguilla
- Batting: Right-handed
- Bowling: Right-arm medium

Domestic team information
- Years: Team
- 1986: Leeward Islands
- Source: CricketArchive, 1 January 2016

Eustace Jerome Proctor (born 15 November 1965) is a former Anguillan cricketer who played for the Leeward Islands in West Indian domestic cricket. He was the second Anguillan to play first-class cricket, after Cardigan Connor, and the first to play for the Leewards.

Proctor made his senior debut for the Anguilla national team at the age of 17, in 1983, and shortly after debuted for the Leeward Islands under-19s. In 1985, he represented the West Indies under-19s in a three-match series against England, twice dismissing future Durham captain Mike Roseberry. Proctor's only first-class appearance came in February 1986, when he appeared for the Leewards against Guyana during the 1985–86 Shell Shield season. He took 1/39 in the first innings and 4/46 in the second, to finish with a first-class bowling average of 17.00. The first batsman he dismissed was Abdul Sattaur, who later played One Day Internationals for Canada, and his fourth wicket was that of Clyde Butts, a West Indies Test player.
