= Winston Williams (cricketer) =

Kittitian cricketer (born 1952)

Personal information
- Full name: Winston Anthony Williams
- Born: 17 November 1952 (age 73); Saint Kitts
- Batting: Right-handed
- Role: Wicket-keeper
- Relatives: Shirlon Williams (brother)

Domestic team information
- Years: Team
- 1976–1978: Leeward Islands
- Source: CricketArchive, 1 January 2016

Winston Anthony Williams (born 17 November 1952) is a former Kittitian cricketer who played for the Leeward Islands in West Indian domestic cricket. He was a wicket-keeper who batted right-handed.

A former Combined Islands under-19 player, Williams made his first-class debut for the Leewards in January 1976, playing in a friendly fixture against the Windward Islands. A few months later, he also played against the touring Indian team. Williams' other first-class appearances all came during the 1977–78 season – two against the Windward Islands, and one against the touring Australians. He also played two limited-overs fixtures during the season, against Guyana and Trinidad and Tobago in the 1977–78 Geddes Grant/Harrison Line Trophy. Williams' younger brother, Shirlon Williams, also played first-class cricket as a wicket-keeper, but the two never appeared together at that level.
