= Enoch Lewis (cricketer) =

West Indian cricketer (born 1954)

Enoch Emmanuel Lewis (born 2 October 1954) is a West Indies former cricketer. He was born in Antigua and played for the Combined Islands and the Leeward Islands teams in the 1970s and 1980s.
