= Javier Liburd =

West Indian cricketer (born 1987)

Javia Liburd
Personal information
- Full name: Javia Springteen Liburd
- Born: 9 February 1987 (age 39); Nevis
- Batting: Right-handed
- Bowling: Right-arm off break
- Role: All-rounder

Domestic team information
- Years: Team
- 2006–present: Nevis
- 2007–present: Leeward Islands
- Source: CricInfo, 27 March 2015

Javier Liburd (born 9 February 1987, in Nevis), is a West Indian cricketer who plays cricket for the Leeward Islands. He is a right-handed batsman and a right-arm off break spin bowler.

== Playing career ==
Liburd made his T20 debut for Nevis at the 2006 Stanford 20/20 tournament held in Antigua, where they scored impressive victories against Leeward Islands rivals St Kitts and Antigua. He made his first class debut for the Leeward Islands in the Regional Four Day Competition the following year against Barbados.
