= Cotton Ground =

- Location in Saint Kitts and Nevis
- Coordinates: 17°10′N 062°37′W
- Country: Saint Kitts and Nevis
- Island: Nevis
- Parish: Saint Thomas Lowland

Cotton Ground is a town on the island of Nevis in Saint Kitts and Nevis. It is the capital of Saint Thomas Lowland Parish.

Horatio Nelson restocked HMS Boreas at the lagoon near Cotton Ground.
