= Luther Kelly (cricketer) =

West Indian cricketer

Personal information
- Full name: Alfred Luther Kelly
- Born: 9 August 1954 (age 72)
- Batting: Right-handed
- Bowling: Right-arm medium
- Role: Opening batsman
- Relatives: Sherwin Kelly

Domestic team information
- Years: Team
- 1976–1990: Leeward Islands
- 1980–1981: Combined Islands

Umpiring information
- WODIs umpired: 7 (2009–2012)
- WT20Is umpired: 7 (2009–2012)
- FC umpired: 22 (2002–2012)
- LA umpired: 6 (2006–2010)
- T20 umpired: 11 (2006–2011)
- Source: CricketArchive, 28 December 2015

Alfred Luther Kelly (born 9 August 1954) is a former Kittitian cricketer who played for the Leeward Islands and the Combined Islands in West Indian domestic cricket. After retiring from playing, he took up umpiring, officiating at both the regional and international level.

Kelly made his first-class debut in January 1976, playing for the Leewards in what was then the annual fixture against the Windward Islands. Later in the year, he also played a single match for the team in the 1975–76 Gillette Cup, a limited-overs competition. Kelly's debut for the Combined Islands team came in the 1979–80 Shell Shield season, and he also played for the team the following season, which was the last in which the Leewards and Windwards did not field separate teams. A right-handed opening batsman, his one and only first-class hundred came in March 1985, when he hit 132 for a Shell Shield XI against the touring New Zealanders. Kelly never made a century for the Leewards, with the highest of his 14 half-centuries being an innings of 88 made against the Windwards during the 1984–85 Shell Shield season. He finished the 1984–85 season with 403 runs, behind only Carlisle Best in the competition.

A mainstay of the Leewards line-up throughout the 1980s, Kelly played his last matches for the team during the 1989–90 season, aged 35. He finished with a first-class career batting average of 31.39, from 47 matches. Kelly made his first-class umpiring debut in the 2001–02 Busta Cup, and after several years at domestic level was chosen as the fourth umpire for the third Test of the 2006 Indian tour of the West Indies. He did not make his international debut as an onfield umpire until November 2009, when he officiated women's ODI and Twenty20 International series between England and the West Indies. Kelly finished his umpiring career after the 2011–12 Regional Four Day Competition.
