= 1972–73 Banks Trophy =

Cricket tournament

- Dates: 13 – 15 April 1973
- Administrator: WICB
- Cricket format: List A (40 overs)
- Tournament format: Knock-out
- Host: Barbados
- Champions: Barbados (1st title)
- Participants: 4
- Matches: 3
- Most runs: (Guyana) Clive Lloyd (101)
- Most wickets: (Jamaica) Arthur Barrett (Barbados) Garfield Sobers (4)

The 1972–73 Banks Trophy was the inaugural edition of what is now the Regional Super50, the domestic limited-overs cricket competition for the countries of the West Indies Cricket Board (WICB). It was the only season of the competition to carry that name.

Four teams contested the tournament – Barbados, Guyana, Jamaica, and Trinidad and Tobago. The Combined Islands, the only other team in West Indian domestic cricket at the time, did not participate, as the Windward Islands were playing a multi-day fixture against the touring Australians at the same time. The Banks Trophy was played as a knock-out tournament over a single weekend, from 13 to 15 April 1973. All matches were played at Kensington Oval, in Bridgetown, Barbados, and had a duration of 40 overs. In the tournament final, Barbados narrowly defeated Guyana, winning by only nine runs. A number of players in the Banks Trophy went on to play a key role in the West Indian team that won the inaugural World Cup in 1975.

== Teams ==
Barbados	Guyana	Jamaica	Trinidad and Tobago
Garfield Sobers (c); Keith Boyce; Robin Bynoe; Stephen Farmer; Geoff Greenidge; Gordon Greenidge; Vanburn Holder; David Holford; Peter Lashley; David Murray; Seymour Nurse	Rohan Kanhai (c); Faoud Bacchus; Len Baichan; Philbert Blair; Basil Butcher; Steve Camacho; Keith Glasgow; Rupert Gomes; Alvin Kallicharran; Clive Lloyd; Chimwala Munilall; Milton Pydanna; Joe Solomon	Maurice Foster (c); Arthur Barrett; Herbert Chang; Uton Dowe; William Haye; Cecil Lawson; Desmond Lewis; Samuel Morgan; Renford Pinnock; Basil Williams; Lyndel Wright	Joey Carew (c); Prince Bartholomew; Charlie Davis; Keith D'Heurieux; Ronald Faria; Sheldon Gomes; Bernard Julien; Raphick Jumadeen; Deryck Murray; Claude Phillip; Pascall Roberts

== Fixtures ==
=== Semi-finals ===
13 April 1973
Scorecard

Guyana; 215 (34.5 overs)	v	Jamaica; 193/8 (36 overs)
Clive Lloyd 71; Arthur Barret 4/30		Desmond Lewis 53; Joe Solomon 1/9

Guyana won by 22 runs
Kensington Oval, Bridgetown

- The match was reduced to 36 overs per side before the start of play.

14 April 1973
Scorecard

Barbados; 239/7 (40 overs)	v	Trinidad and Tobago; 175 (39.5 overs)
Keith Boyce 80; Bernard Julien 2/31		Sheldon Gomes 46; Garfield Sobers 2/16

Barbados won by 64 runs
Kensington Oval, Bridgetown

=== Final ===
15 April 1973
Scorecard

Barbados; 201 (38.3 overs)	v	Guyana; 192 (38.4 overs)
Geoff Greenidge 48; Chimwala Munilall 3/27		Rohan Kanhai 82; Vanburn Holder 2/23

Barbados won by 9 runs
Kensington Oval, Bridgetown

== See also ==
- 1972–73 Shell Shield season
