= Indian cricket team in the West Indies in 1970–71 =

International cricket tour

Indian cricket team in West Indies in 1971
- Date: 5 February – 19 April 1971
- Location: (Cricket West Indies) West Indies
- Result: India won the 5-Test series 1–0
Teams
- West Indies: India
Captains
- Garry Sobers: Ajit Wadekar
Most runs
- Garry Sobers (597) Charlie Davis (529) Rohan Kanhai (433): Sunil Gavaskar (774); Dilip Sardesai (642); Eknath Solkar (224)
Most wickets
- Jack Noreiga (17) Garry Sobers (12) John Shepherd (7): S. Venkataraghavan (22); Bishan Singh Bedi (15); Erapalli Prasanna (11)

The India national cricket team toured the West Indies during the 1970–71 cricket season. They played five Test matches against the West Indian cricket team, with India winning the series 1–0.

The series can be deemed a landmark in Indian cricket in many ways. This was India's first ever test victory and test series victory over the West Indies. It was also their first victory in West Indies. The series marked the international debut for the batting maestro Sunil Gavaskar and he scored heavily in this series, including four test centuries and a double century. He would go on to serve India for almost 17 more years.

== Touring party ==
The Indian touring party was announced by the BCCI on 13 January 1971. The selectors named Ajit Wadekar the captain upon dropping Mansoor Ali Khan Pataudi and Chandu Borde, the latter due to lack of form and fitness. S. Venkataraghavan was named the vice-captain. Notable exclusions included spinner B. S. Chandrasekhar, and Farokh Engineer and Rusi Surti, the latter two owing to a ruling that they must have played during the season's Ranji Trophy competition. Keki Tarapore was appointed the tour manager and Subhash Gupte, the liaison officer.

The team members were:

- Ajit Wadekar, Bombay, captain & batsman
- S. Venkataraghavan, Tamil Nadu, vice-captain & off break bowler
- Syed Abid Ali, Hyderabad, medium bowler
- Bishan Singh Bedi, Delhi, left arm spin bowler
- Salim Durani, Rajasthan, left arm spin bowler
- Sunil Gavaskar, Bombay, opening batsman
- Devraj Govindraj, Hyderabad, fast-medium bowler
- ML Jaisimha, Hyderabad, all-rounder
- Kenia Jayantilal, Hyderabad, opening batsman
- Rusi Jeejeebhoy, Bengal, wicket-keeper
- Pochiah Krishnamurthy, Hyderabad, wicket-keeper
- Ashok Mankad, Bombay, batsman
- EAS Prasanna, Mysore, off break bowler
- Dilip Sardesai, Bombay, batsman
- Eknath Solkar, Bombay, left arm medium bowler
- Gundappa Viswanath, Mysore, batsman

== Tour matches ==
=== Four-day: Jamaica vs Indians ===
5–8 February
Scorecard

Indians	v	Jamaica
272 (98.2 overs); Dilip Sardesai 97; Maurice Foster 4/23 (16 overs)		280 (110.4 overs); Desmond Lewis 96; Bishan Singh Bedi 3/58 (33.4 overs)
290/7d (111.1 overs); Salim Durani 131; Othneil Miles 3/49 (30.1 overs)		103/1 (44 overs); Desmond Lewis 67*; Bishan Singh Bedi 1/20 (14 overs)

Match drawn
Sabina Park, Kingston, Jamaica
Umpires: Douglas Sang Hue and N Sealey

- Indians won the toss and decided to bat.

=== Four-day: West Indies Board President's XI v Indians ===
11–14 February
Scorecard

Indians	v	West Indies Board President's XI
280 (116.5 overs); Eknath Solkar 51; Maurice Foster 3/27 (15.5 overs)		184 (76.4 overs); Keith Boyce 41; Bishan Singh Bedi 5/94 (32 overs)
172/7d (62.5 overs); Kenia Jayantilal 58*; Grayson Shillingford 3/41 (13 overs)		212/4 (62 overs); Alvin Kallicharran 57*; Syed Abid Ali 1/29 (6 overs)

Match drawn
Jarrett Park, Montego Bay, Jamaica
Umpires: Johnny Gayle and Wesley Malcolm

- West Indies Board President's XI won the toss and elected to field.

=== Three-day: Leeward Islands v Indians ===
25–28 February
Scorecard

Indians	v	Leeward Islands
361/6d (135 overs); Ajit Wadekar 128*; Ed Arthurton 3/93 (42 overs)		147 (63 overs); Leonard Williams; ML Jaisimha 5/38 (17 overs)
		270 (94.3 overs); Livingstone Sargeant 56; ML Jaisimha 5/79 (37 overs)

Indians won by 9 wickets
Warner Park, Basseterre, Saint Kitts and Nevis
Umpires: D. Griffith and P. Queeley

- Toss not known.
- Leonard Williams and E Barrett (Leeward Islands) made their first-class debuts.

The Indians got off to a good start batting first, with Sunil Gavaskar and Ashok Mankad putting together 47 runs for the first wicket. Left-arm spinner Elquemedo Willett bowled out Mankad before lunch, with Ed Arthurton bowling a hostile spell of seam bowling after, to dismiss the Indians' middle-order that included wickets of M. L. Jaisimha and Salim Durani. Gavaskar, playing his first game of the tour, made 82 being dismissed caught and bowled by Willett. His side collapsed to 194/6 before Ajit Wadekar and Syed Abid Ali stitched a 112-run partnership taking their side to 306/6 at end of play on day one. Wadekar, who was dropped twice before he go to 10 went on to make a century.

=== Four-day: Trinidad and Tobago v Indians ===
1–4 March 1971
Scorecard

Indians	v	Trinidad and Tobago
464/7d (158 overs); Sunil Gavaskar 125; Inshan Ali 3/151 (39 overs)		338 (133.1 overs); Charlie Davis 100; Syed Abid Ali 4/80 (24.1 overs)
162/5d (68 overs); Sunil Gavaskar 63; Alvin Corneal 2/26 (25 overs)		126/0 (43 overs); Oscar Durity 64*; ML Jaisimha 0/3 (3 overs)

Match drawn
Guaracara Park, Pointe-à-Pierre, Trinidad
Umpires: Ralph Gosein and Stuart Ishmael

- Indians won the toss and elected to bat.
- Sunil Gavaskar (Indians) passed 1,000 runs in first-class cricket.

=== Four-day: Barbados v Indians ===
27–30 March
Scorecard

Indians	v	Barbados
185 (53 overs); Ajit Wadekar 43; John Shepherd 4/40 (14 overs)		449 (112.5 overs); Garfield Sobers 135; Syed Abid Ali 5/107 (32.5 overs)
313 (125.4 overs); Kenia Jayantilal 76; Tony Howard 4/59 (24.4 overs)		52/1 (8.2 overs); Seymour Nurse 26*; Devraj Govindraj 1/32 (4 overs)

Barbados won by 9 wickets
Kensington Oval, Bridgetown, Barbados
Umpires: D. Griffith and Cortez Jordan

- Barbados won the toss and decided to field.

=== Three-day: Windward Islands v Indians ===
8–10 April 1971
Scorecard

Windward Islands	v	Indians
207 (102 overs); Mike Findlay 62; Bishan Singh Bedi 4/52 (33 overs)		197/9d (81.5 overs); Kenia Jayantilal 65; Martial Francis 4/78 (29 overs)
171/9d (64.5 overs); Norbert Phillip 38; Devraj Govindraj 3/17 (8.5 overs)		92/2 (28 overs); Salim Durani 34*; Joe Gibbs 1/26 (5 overs)

Match drawn
Botanical Gardens, Roseau, Dominica

- Indians won the toss and decided to field.

== Test matches ==
=== 1st Test ===
18–23 February 1971
Sccorecard

India	v	West Indies
387 (158.4 overs); Dilip Sardesai 212; Vanburn Holder 4/60 (27.4 overs)		217 (93.5 overs); Rohan Kanhai 56; Erapalli Prasanna 4/65 (33 overs)
		385/5 (136 overs) (f/o); Rohan Kanhai 158; Eknath Solkar 2/56 (22 overs)

Match drawn
Sabina Park, Kingston
Umpires: Ralph Gosein (WI) and Douglas Sang Hue (WI)

- West Indies won the toss and decided to field.
- Kenia Jayantilal and Pochiah Krishnamurthy (Ind), and Arthur Barrett and Jack Noreiga (WI) made their Test debuts.
- 21 February was a rest day.
- As it was effectively a 4-day match, deficit required to enforce follow on was 150.

=== 2nd Test ===
6–10 March 1971
Scorecard

West Indies	v	India
214 (72.5 overs); Charlie Davis 71; Erapalli Prasanna 4/54 (19.5 overs)		352 (157.4 overs); Dilip Sardesai 112; Jack Noreiga 9/95 (49.4 overs)
261 (110.5 overs); Roy Fredericks 80; Srinivas Venkataraghavan 5/95 (36 overs)		125/3 (49.4 overs); Sunil Gavaskar 67; Arthur Barrett 3/43 (8.4 overs)

India won by 7 wickets
Queen's Park Oval, Port of Spain
Umpires: Ralph Gosein (WI) and Stuart Ishmael (WI)

- West Indies won the toss and decided to bat.
- Sunil Gavaskar (Ind) made his Test debut.
- 8 March was a rest day.
- This was India's first victory against the West Indies in test cricket.

=== 3rd Test ===
19–24 March 1971
Scorecard

West Indies	v	India
363 (158.2 overs); Desmond Lewis 81; Srinivas Venkataraghavan 3/128 (59 overs)		376 (167.4 overs); Sunil Gavaskar 116; Garry Sobers 3/72 (43 overs)
307/3d (100 overs); Charlie Davis 125; Bishan Singh Bedi 2/55 (26 overs)		123/0 (30 overs); Sunil Gavaskar 64; Lance Gibbs 0/4 (1 overs)

Match drawn
Bourda, Georgetown
Umpires: Ralph Gosein (WI) and Cecil Kippins (WI)

- West Indies won the toss and decided to bat.
- Keith Boyce and Desmond Lewis (WI) made their Test debuts.
- 22 March was a rest day.

=== 4th Test ===
1–6 April 1971
Scorecard

West Indies	v	India
501/5d (171 overs); Garry Sobers 178; Bishan Singh Bedi 2/124 (54 overs)		347 (125.4 overs); Dilip Sardesai 150; Uton Dowe 4/69 (23 overs)
180/6d (43 overs); Roy Fredericks 48; Abid Ali 3/70 (21 overs)		221/5 (103 overs); Sunil Gavaskar 117; Garry Sobers 2/31 (23 overs)

Match drawn
Kensington Oval, Bridgetown
Umpires: Cortez Jordan (WI) and Douglas Sang Hue (WI)

- India won the toss and decided to field.
- Inshan Ali and Uton Dowe (WI) made their Test debuts.
- 5 April was a rest day.

=== 5th Test ===
13–19 April 1971
Scorecard

India	v	West Indies
360 (133.3 overs); Sunil Gavaskar 124; David Holford 3/68 (28.3 overs)		526 (216.3 overs); Garry Sobers 132; Srinivas Venkataraghavan 4/100 (37.3 overs)
427 (197.4 overs); Sunil Gavaskar 220; Jack Noreiga 5/129 (53.4 overs)		165/8 (40 overs); Clive Lloyd 64; Syed Abid Ali 3/73 (15 overs)

Match drawn
Queen's Park Oval, Port of Spain
Umpires: Ralph Gosein (WI) and Douglas Sang Hue (WI)

- India won the toss and decided to bat.
- 16 April was a rest day.
