= 1970–71 Shell Shield season =

Cricket tournament

- Dates: 22 January – 23 April 1971
- Administrator: WICB
- Cricket format: First-class (four-day)
- Tournament format: Round-robin
- Champions: Trinidad and Tobago (2nd title)
- Participants: 5
- Matches: 10
- Most runs: (Trinidad and Tobago) Joey Carew (347)
- Most wickets: (Jamaica) Uton Dowe (24)

The 1970–71 Shell Shield season was the fifth edition of what is now the Regional Four Day Competition, the domestic first-class cricket competition for the countries of the West Indies Cricket Board (WICB). The tournament was sponsored by Royal Dutch Shell, with matches played from 22 January to 23 April 1971.

Five teams contested the competition – Barbados, the Combined Islands, Guyana, Jamaica, and Trinidad and Tobago. Trinidad and Tobago and Jamaica both won two and drew two of their four matches, but Trinidad and Tobago finished with more points, winning a second consecutive title. Trinidadian batsman Joey Carew led the tournament in runs for a second consecutive season, while Jamaican fast bowler Uton Dowe was the leading wicket-taker.

== Points table ==
Team	Pld	W	L	DWF	DLF	Pts
Trinidad and Tobago	4	2	0	1	1	32
Jamaica	4	2	0	0	2	28
Barbados	4	1	2	1	0	18
Guyana	4	0	1	2	1	14
Combined Islands	4	1	3	0	0	12
Source: CricketArchive

Key

- Pld – Matches played
- W – Outright win (12 points)
- L – Outright loss (0 points)
- DWF – Drawn, but won first innings (6 points)
- DLF – Drawn, but lost first innings (2 points)
- Pts – Total points

== Statistics ==
=== Most runs ===
The top five run-scorers are included in this table, listed by runs scored and then by batting average.

Player	Team	Runs	Inns	Avg	Highest	100s	50s
Joey Carew	Trinidad and Tobago	347	7	57.83	91	0	3
Maurice Foster	Jamaica	334	6	55.66	146	1	2
Richard de Souza	Trinidad and Tobago	325	7	81.25	95	0	4
Lawrence Rowe	Jamaica	312	6	52.00	114	1	1
Robin Bynoe	Barbados	275	6	55.00	72	0	3

=== Most wickets ===
The top five wicket-takers are listed in this table, listed by wickets taken and then by bowling average.

Player	Team	Overs	Wkts	Ave	5	10	BBI
Uton Dowe	Jamaica	130.0	24	15.75	3	0	7/19
Jack Noreiga	Trinidad and Tobago	143.0	19	16.47	2	1	6/67
Arthur Barrett	Jamaica	165.1	17	30.64	1	0	5/96
David Holford	Barbados	91.2	15	18.46	1	0	5/99
Grayson Shillingford	Combined Islands	94.0	14	20.78	1	0	6/77
