= 1973–74 Shell Shield season =

Cricket tournament

- Dates: 5 January – 28 February 1974
- Administrator: WICB
- Cricket format: First-class (four-day)
- Tournament format: Round-robin
- Champions: Barbados (4th title)
- Participants: 5
- Matches: 10
- Most runs: (Jamaica) Maurice Foster (400)
- Most wickets: (Trinidad and Tobago) Inshan Ali (27)

The 1973–74 Shell Shield season was the eighth edition of what is now the Regional Four Day Competition, the domestic first-class cricket competition for the countries of the West Indies Cricket Board (WICB). The tournament was sponsored by Royal Dutch Shell, with matches played from 5 January to 28 February 1974.

Five teams contested the competition – Barbados, the Combined Islands, Guyana, Jamaica, and Trinidad and Tobago. Barbados were undefeated, winning two matches and drawing two to claim a fourth title. Jamaican batsman Maurice Foster led the tournament in runs for a third consecutive season, while Trinidadian slow left-arm wrist-spin bowler Inshan Ali was the leading wicket-taker.

== Points table ==
Team	Pld	W	L	LWF	DWF	DLF	Pts
Barbados	4	2	0	0	1	1	32
Trinidad and Tobago	4	2	1	0	0	1	26
Jamaica	4	1	0	1	1	1	24
Guyana	4	1	1	0	1	1	20
Combined Islands	4	0	1	2	1	0	14
Source: CricketArchive

Key

- W – Outright win (12 points)
- L – Outright loss (0 points)
- LWF – Lost match, but won first innings (4 points)
- DWF – Drawn, but won first innings (6 points)
- DLF – Drawn, but lost first innings (2 points)
- Pts – Total points

== Statistics ==
=== Most runs ===
The top five run-scorers are included in this table, listed by runs scored and then by batting average.

Player	Team	Runs	Inns	Avg	Highest	100s	50s
Maurice Foster	Jamaica	400	5	100.00	186	2	1
Clive Lloyd	Guyana	385	4	128.33	134	2	2
Lawrence Rowe	Jamaica	342	6	68.40	204	1	1
Alvin Kallicharran	Guyana	325	6	54.16	197	1	0
Len Baichan	Guyana	276	6	46.00	113	1	1

=== Most wickets ===
The top five wicket-takers are listed in this table, listed by wickets taken and then by bowling average.

Player	Team	Overs	Wkts	Ave	5	10	BBI
Inshan Ali	Trinidad and Tobago	158.4	27	16.07	3	1	7/20
Rex Collymore	Guyana	200.4	20	17.05	3	0	5/57
Arthur Barrett	Jamaica	188.4	17	28.41	2	1	6/87
Andy Roberts	Combined Islands	108.1	16	19.37	1	0	5/62
Uton Dowe	Jamaica	114.0	14	23.50	0	0	4/94
