= 1972–73 Shell Shield season =

Cricket tournament

- Dates: 6 January – 1 March 1973
- Administrator: WICB
- Cricket format: First-class (four-day)
- Tournament format: Round-robin
- Champions: Guyana (1st title)
- Participants: 5
- Matches: 10
- Most runs: (Jamaica) Maurice Foster (522)
- Most wickets: (Guyana) Lance Gibbs (22)

The 1972–73 Shell Shield season was the seventh edition of what is now the Regional Four Day Competition, the domestic first-class cricket competition for the countries of the West Indies Cricket Board (WICB). The tournament was sponsored by Royal Dutch Shell, with matches played from 6 January to 1 March 1973.

Five teams contested the competition – Barbados, the Combined Islands, Guyana, Jamaica, and Trinidad and Tobago. Guyana and Trinidad and Tobago were both undefeated, either winning or drawing all of their games, but Guyana finished with more points, claiming their maiden title. Jamaican batsman Maurice Foster led the tournament in runs for a second consecutive season, while Guyanese off-spinner Lance Gibbs was the leading wicket-taker.

== Points table ==
| Team | Pld | W | L | DWF | DLF | Pts |
|---|---|---|---|---|---|---|
| Guyana | 4 | 2 | 0 | 1 | 1 | 32 |
| Trinidad and Tobago | 4 | 1 | 0 | 1 | 2 | 22 |
| Barbados | 4 | 1 | 1 | 1 | 1 | 20 |
| Combined Islands | 4 | 1 | 2 | 0 | 1 | 14 |
| Jamaica | 4 | 0 | 2 | 2 | 0 | 12 |
Source: CricketArchive

Key

- Pld – Matches played
- W – Outright win (12 points)
- L – Outright loss (0 points)
- DWF – Drawn, but won first innings (6 points)
- DLF – Drawn, but lost first innings (2 points)
- Pts – Total points

== Statistics ==
=== Most runs ===
The top five run-scorers are included in this table, listed by runs scored and then by batting average.

| Player | Team | Runs | Inns | Avg | Highest | 100s | 50s |
|---|---|---|---|---|---|---|---|
| Maurice Foster | Jamaica | 522 | 7 | 104.40 | 145* | 3 | 1 |
| Steve Camacho | Guyana | 425 | 6 | 70.83 | 144 | 1 | 4 |
| Peter Lashley | Barbados | 381 | 6 | 76.20 | 144* | 1 | 2 |
| Roy Fredericks | Guyana | 339 | 4 | 113.00 | 118 | 1 | 3 |
| Geoff Greenidge | Barbados | 308 | 6 | 51.33 | 99 | 0 | 4 |

=== Most wickets ===
The top five wicket-takers are listed in this table, listed by wickets taken and then by bowling average.

| Player | Team | Overs | Wkts | Ave | 5 | 10 | BBI |
|---|---|---|---|---|---|---|---|
| Lance Gibbs | Guyana | 182.3 | 22 | 16.13 | 2 | 2 | 6/39 |
| Elquemedo Willett | Combined Islands | 208.2 | 18 | 23.77 | 1 | 0 | 6/40 |
| Uton Dowe | Jamaica | 116.0 | 16 | 20.25 | 0 | 0 | 4/66 |
| Raphick Jumadeen | Trinidad and Tobago | 195.5 | 15 | 32.93 | 1 | 0 | 6/60 |
| Norbert Phillip | Combined Islands | 112.3 | 13 | 25.92 | 0 | 0 | 4/34 |

== See also ==
- 1972–73 Banks Trophy
