= 1971–72 Shell Shield season =

Cricket tournament

- Dates: 21 January – 3 March 1972
- Administrator: WICB
- Cricket format: First-class (four-day)
- Tournament format: Round-robin
- Champions: Barbados (3rd title)
- Participants: 5
- Matches: 10
- Most runs: (Jamaica) Maurice Foster (511)
- Most wickets: (Barbados) Vanburn Holder (20)

The 1971–72 Shell Shield season was the fifth edition of what is now the Regional Four Day Competition, the domestic first-class cricket competition for the countries of the West Indies Cricket Board (WICB). The tournament was sponsored by Royal Dutch Shell, with matches played from 21 January to 3 March 1972.

Five teams contested the competition – Barbados, the Combined Islands, Guyana, Jamaica, and Trinidad and Tobago. Barbados were undefeated, winning three of their four matches and drawing the other to claim a third title (and first since the 1966–67 season). Jamaican batsman Maurice Foster led the tournament in runs, while Barbadian fast bowler Vanburn Holder was the leading wicket-taker.

== Points table ==
Team	Pld	W	L	LWF	DWF	DLF	Pts
Barbados	4	3	0	0	0	1	38
Guyana	4	1	0	0	2	1	26
Jamaica	4	1	2	0	1	0	18
Trinidad and Tobago	4	1	1	0	0	2	16
Combined Islands	4	0	1	2	1	0	14
Source: CricketArchive

Key

- W – Outright win (12 points)
- L – Outright loss (0 points)
- LWF – Lost, but won first innings (4 points)
- DWF – Drawn, but won first innings (6 points)
- DLF – Drawn, but lost first innings (2 points)
- Pts – Total points

== Statistics ==
=== Most runs ===
The top five run-scorers are included in this table, listed by runs scored and then by batting average.

Player	Team	Runs	Inns	Avg	Highest	100s	50s
Maurice Foster	Jamaica	511	7	85.16	160	3	1
Roy Fredericks	Guyana	485	7	69.28	111	1	4
Robin Bynoe	Barbados	350	6	70.00	190	1	1
Charlie Davis	Trinidad and Tobago	322	6	64.40	180*	1	2
Alvin Kallicharran	Guyana	307	7	43.85	83	0	3

=== Most wickets ===
The top five wicket-takers are listed in this table, listed by wickets taken and then by bowling average.

Player	Team	Overs	Wkts	Ave	5	10	BBI
Vanburn Holder	Barbados	138.1	20	13.60	1	1	7/44
Bernard Julien	Trinidad and Tobago	128.5	19	20.21	0	0	4/28
Grayson Shillingford	Combined Islands	106.3	17	20.64	1	0	6/49
Raphick Jumadeen	Trinidad and Tobago	120.5	15	19.13	2	0	6/31
Prince Bartholomew	Trinidad and Tobago	102.0	14	24.14	0	0	4/76
