= Pascall Roberts =

West Indian cricketer

Personal information
- Full name: Pascall Ronald Roberts
- Born: 15 December 1937; Port of Spain, Trinidad
- Died: 20 June 2011 (aged 73)
- Batting: Right-handed
- Bowling: Slow left-arm orthodox, left-arm fast-medium

Domestic team information
- Years: Team
- 1960-61 to 1971-72: Trinidad
- 1960-61 to 1978-79: North Trinidad

Career statistics
Competition	First-class	List A
Matches	67	1
Runs scored	871	5
Batting average	13.82	5.00
100s/50s	1/0	0/0
Top score	105 not out	5
Balls bowled	14973	48
Wickets	211	2
Bowling average	25.05	21.50
5 wickets in innings	7	0
10 wickets in match	1	n/a
Best bowling	6/17	2/43
Catches/stumpings	32/–	1/–
- Source: Cricket Archive, 2 July 2014

Pascall Ronald Roberts (15 December 1937 – 20 June 2011) was a Trinidad cricketer who played first-class cricket from 1961 to 1979. He toured with the West Indian cricket team in England in 1969 but did not play Test cricket.

A versatile left-arm bowler who could open the bowling and also bowl orthodox spin, Roberts made his first-class debut for Trinidad in 1960-61, taking 5 for 79 and 3 for 61 against Barbados. In his third match later that season he took 5 for 111 and 3 for 77 against E.W. Swanton's XI.

Roberts played as a professional for Lowerhouse in the Lancashire League in 1963, when he made 283 runs at 17.48 and took 60 wickets at 12.98, and 1965, when he made 234 runs at 10.63 and took 70 wickets at 13.81.

He played regularly for Trinidad throughout the 1960s, as well as appearing for North Trinidad in the Beaumont Cup, which was in those years a first-class competition. He was called for throwing during the 1966-67 Shell Shield.

He took 13 wickets at an average of 26.07 in the 1968–69 Shell Shield season, and was selected for the 1969 tour of England. He played 11 first-class matches on the tour but took only 16 wickets at 46.50.

After the 1969–70 season he lost his place in the Trinidad side to the spinners Jack Noreiga, Inshan Ali and Raphick Jumadeen, but he continued to be prominent in the Beaumont Cup. In the 1970-71 final he took 5 for 47 and 4 for 48 against East Trinidad. He captained North Trinidad from 1974-75 (when they won the title) to 1976-77. His only first-class score over 50 was 105 not out for North Trinidad against South Trinidad in 1976-77, after taking 6 for 66. In his last season, 1978–79, aged 41, he took 6 for 17 and 4 for 17 in an innings victory over Tobago. In all matches for North Trinidad he took 98 wickets at 16.58.
