= English cricket team in India and Sri Lanka in 1976–77 =

International cricket tour

English cricket team in India in 1976-77
- Date: 29 November 1976 - 16 February 1977
- Location: India
- Result: England won the 5-Test series 3-1
Teams
- India: England
Captains
- Bishan Singh Bedi: Tony Greig
Most runs
- Sunil Gavaskar (394) Brijesh Patel (286) Surinder Amarnath (180): Dennis Amiss (417); Tony Greig (342); Alan Knott (268)
Most wickets
- Bishan Singh Bedi (25) Chandrasekhar (19) Erapalli Prasanna (18): Derek Underwood (29); John Lever (26); Bob Willis (20)

A cricket team from England, organised by the Marylebone Cricket Club, toured India and Sri Lanka in the 1976-77 cricket season. They played five Test matches against the India national cricket team, with England winning three matches, India winning one and the other one being drawn. The MCC team played four matches in Sri Lanka after leaving India, but Sri Lanka was not yet a Test-class team.

== Test matches ==
=== 1st Test ===
17–22 December 1976
Scorecard

| England | v | India |
| 381 (151.5 overs); Dennis Amiss 179 (397); Bishan Singh Bedi 4/92 (59 overs) | | 122 (51.5 overs); Sunil Gavaskar 38 (140); John Lever 7/46 (23 overs) |
| | | 234 (f/o) (110.4 overs); Sunil Gavaskar 71 (215); Derek Underwood 4/78 (44 overs) |

England won by an innings and 25 runs
Feroz Shah Kotla, Delhi
Umpires: M. V. Nagendra (Ind) and Judah Reuben (Ind)

- England won the toss and decided to bat.
- Graham Barlow and John Lever (both Eng) made their debut in Tests.
- 20 December was a rest day.
- John Lever's bowling figures of 7/46 in India's first innings were the best by an England bowler on Test debut.

=== 2nd Test ===
1–6 January 1977
Scorecard

| India | v | England |
| 155 (75 overs); Gundappa Viswanath 35 (109); Bob Willis 5/27 (20 overs) | | 321 (178.4 overs); Tony Greig 103 (347); Bishan Singh Bedi 5/110 (64 overs) |
| 181 (70.5 overs); Brijesh Patel 56 (163); Chris Old 3/38 (12 overs) | | 16/0 (3.4 overs); Dennis Amiss 7* (18); Graham Barlow 7* (5); Madan Lal 0/3 (1 over) |

England won by 10 wickets
Eden Gardens, Calcutta
Umpires: B. Satyaji Rao (Ind) and Har Sharma (Ind)

- India won the toss and decided to bat.
- Derek Randall and Roger Tolchard (both Eng) made their debut in Tests.
- 4 January was a rest day.

=== 3rd Test ===
14–19 January 1977
Scorecard

| England | v | India |
| 262 (125.5 overs); Mike Brearley 59 (205); Bishan Singh Bedi 4/72 (38.5 overs) | | 164 (73.5 overs); Sunil Gavaskar 39 (135); John Lever 5/59 (19.5 overs) |
| 185/9d (71.5 overs); Dennis Amiss 46 (109); Bhagwat Chandrasekhar 5/50 (20.5 overs) | | 83 (38.5 overs); Sunil Gavaskar 24 (66); Derek Underwood 4/28 (14 overs) |

England won by 200 runs
M. A. Chidambaram Stadium, Chennai
Umpires: Judah Reuben (Ind) and M. S. Sivasankariah (Ind)

- England won the toss and decided to bat.
- 17 January was a rest day.
- Bishan Singh Bedi became the first India player to take 200 wickets in Tests.

=== 4th Test ===
28 January–2 February 1977
Scorecard

| India | v | England |
| 253 (85 overs); Surinder Amarnath 63 (103); Bob Willis 6/53 (17 overs) | | 195 (96.2 overs); Dennis Amiss 82 (189); Bhagwat Chandrasekhar 6/76 (31.2 overs) |
| 259/9d (91 overs); Gundappa Viswanath 79* (158); Derek Underwood 4/76 (31 overs) | | 177 (57.3 overs); Alan Knott 81* (91); Bishan Singh Bedi 6/71 (21.3 overs) |

India won by 140 runs
M Chinnaswamy Stadium, Bangalore
Umpires: Mohammad Ghouse (Ind) and M. V. Nagendra (Ind)

- India won the toss and decided to bat.
- Yajurvindra Singh (Ind) made his debut in Tests.
- 31 January was a rest day.

=== 5th Test ===
11–16 February 1977
Scorecard

| India | v | England |
| 338 (105.4 overs); Sunil Gavaskar 108 (219); Derek Underwood 4/89 (38 overs) | | 317 (154 overs); Mike Brearley 91 (259); Erapalli Prasanna 4/73 (52 overs) |
| 192 (70.4 overs); Surinder Amarnath 63 (103); Derek Underwood 5/84 (33 overs) | | 152/7 (71 overs); Keith Fletcher 58* (148); Karsan Ghavri 5/33 (15 overs) |

Match drawn
Wankhede Stadium, Bombay
Umpires: B. Satyaji Rao (Ind) and Har Sharma (Ind)

- India won the toss and decided to bat.
- 13 February was a rest day.
- Derek Underwood's (Eng) five-wicket haul meant he now had one against each Test-playing nation.
- Underwood finished the series with 29 wickets, equalling the record held by Fred Trueman for most wickets by an England bowler in a Test series against India.
