= 1968–69 Ranji Trophy =

Indian cricket tournament

- The Ranji Trophy
- Administrator(s): BCCI
- Cricket format: First-class
- Tournament format(s): League and knockout
- Champions: Bombay (20th title)
- Participants: 23
- Most runs: Vijay Bhosle (Bombay) (507)
- Most wickets: E. A. S. Prasanna (Mysore) (39)

The 1968–69 Ranji Trophy was the 35th season of the Ranji Trophy. Bombay retained the title defeating Bengal in the final.

== Highlights ==
- M. V. Nagendra was an umpire in the final between Bombay and Bengal, emulating his father M. G. Vijayasarathi who stood in the 1940–41 final.

== Group stage ==
=== North Zone ===
Team	Pld	W	L	D	T	NR	Pts	Q
Delhi	4	2	0	2	0	0	25	1.815
Railways	4	1	0	3	0	0	24	1.799
Services	4	1	1	2	0	0	17	1.358
Punjab	4	1	1	2	0	0	15	0.890
Jammu & Kashmir	4	0	3	1	0	0	3	0.171

=== West Zone ===
Team	Pld	W	L	D	T	NR	Pts	Q
Bombay	4	1	0	3	0	0	25	1.540
Gujarat	4	2	0	2	0	0	24	1.051
Maharashtra	4	1	0	3	0	0	17	1.049
Baroda	4	0	1	3	0	0	11	0.802
Saurashtra	4	0	3	1	0	0	5	0.771

=== East Zone ===
Team	Pld	W	L	D	T	NR	Pts	Q
Bengal	3	3	0	0	0	0	24	2.704
Bihar	3	2	1	0	0	0	16	1.934
Assam	3	1	2	0	0	0	8	0.497
Orissa	3	0	3	0	0	0	0	0.394

=== South Zone ===
Team	Pld	W	L	D	T	NR	Pts	Q
Mysore	4	3	0	1	0	0	31	1.983
Hyderabad	4	3	0	1	0	0	29	1.760
Madras	4	2	2	0	0	0	18	1.654
Andhra	4	0	3	1	0	0	5	0.565
Kerala	4	0	3	1	0	0	3	0.318

=== Central Zone ===
Team	Pld	W	L	D	T	NR	Pts	Q
Rajasthan	3	2	0	1	0	0	21	1.645
Vidarbha	3	1	0	2	0	0	16	1.364
Madhya Pradesh	3	1	1	1	0	0	11	0.951
Uttar Pradesh	3	0	3	0	0	0	0	0.497

== Knockout stage ==
Quarter-finals
11 Jan 1969 – Delhi
Delhi	187 & 241/4
Rajasthan	473 & 190/6d

Semi-finals
31 Jan 1969 – Udaipur
Rajasthan	226 & 377/2
Bombay	559
31 Jan 1969 – Bangalore
Mysore	188 & 106
Bengal	251 & 158

Final
15 Feb 1969 – Bombay
Bombay	469 & 77/3
Bengal	387 & 261/7d

=== Final ===
15–19 February 1969
Scorecard

Bengal	v	Bombay (H)
387 (157.3 overs); Chuni Goswami 96; Eknath Solkar 3/63, Milind Rege 3/63		469 (156.2 overs); Ajit Wadekar 133; Gopal Bose 3/88
261/7 decl (122.2 overs); Chuni Goswami 84; Ambar Roy 1/9		77/3 (17 overs); Eknath Solkar 36; Ramakant Desai 2/48

Bombay won on first innings lead
Brabourne Stadium, Bombay
Umpires: M. V. Nagendra and S. K. Raghunatha Rao

- Bengal won the toss and decided to bat

== Scorecards and averages ==
- CricketArchive
