= 1969–70 Shell Shield season =

Cricket tournament

- Dates: 30 January – 21 March 1970
- Administrator: WICB
- Cricket format: First-class (four-day)
- Tournament format: Round-robin
- Champions: Trinidad and Tobago (1st title)
- Participants: 5
- Matches: 10
- Most runs: (Trinidad and Tobago) Joey Carew (523)
- Most wickets: (Jamaica) Arthur Barrett (26)

The 1969–70 Shell Shield season was the fourth edition of what is now the Regional Four Day Competition, the domestic first-class cricket competition for the countries of the West Indies Cricket Board (WICB). The tournament was sponsored by Royal Dutch Shell, with matches played from 30 January to 21 March 1970.

Five teams contested the competition – Barbados, the Combined Islands, Guyana, Jamaica, and Trinidad and Tobago. The Combined Islands team, comprising players from the Leeward and Windward Islands, was returning for the first time since the 1966–67 season. They failed to win a match, while at the top of the table Trinidad and Tobago won three of their four matches, claiming their maiden title. Trinidadian batsman Joey Carew led the tournament in runs, while Jamaican leg spinner Arthur Barrett was the leading wicket-taker.

== Points table ==
| Team | Pld | W | L | DWF | DLF | Pts |
|---|---|---|---|---|---|---|
| Trinidad and Tobago | 4 | 3 | 1 | 0 | 0 | 36 |
| Jamaica | 4 | 2 | 1 | 1 | 0 | 30 |
| Barbados | 4 | 2 | 0 | 0 | 2 | 28 |
| Guyana | 4 | 1 | 2 | 1 | 0 | 18 |
| Combined Islands | 4 | 0 | 4 | 0 | 0 | 0 |
Source: CricketArchive

Key

- Pld – Matches played
- W – Outright win (12 points)
- L – Outright loss (0 points)
- DWF – Drawn, but won first innings (6 points)
- DLF – Drawn, but lost first innings (2 points)
- Pts – Total points

== Statistics ==
=== Most runs ===
The top five run-scorers are included in this table, listed by runs scored and then by batting average.

| Player | Team | Runs | Inns | Avg | Highest | 100s | 50s |
|---|---|---|---|---|---|---|---|
| Joey Carew | Trinidad and Tobago | 523 | 6 | 87.16 | 164 | 3 | 1 |
| Peter Lashley | Barbados | 454 | 8 | 56.75 | 118 | 1 | 3 |
| Alvin Kallicharran | Guyana | 397 | 7 | 56.71 | 137 | 1 | 4 |
| Clive Lloyd | Guyana | 334 | 7 | 66.80 | 100* | 1 | 2 |
| Roy Fredericks | Guyana | 327 | 7 | 46.71 | 121 | 1 | 1 |

=== Most wickets ===
The top five wicket-takers are listed in this table, listed by wickets taken and then by bowling average.

| Player | Team | Overs | Wkts | Ave | 5 | 10 | BBI |
|---|---|---|---|---|---|---|---|
| Arthur Barrett | Jamaica | 191.4 | 26 | 22.26 | 3 | 1 | 6/78 |
| Willie Rodriguez | Trinidad and Tobago | 98.3 | 17 | 15.47 | 2 | 0 | 5/12 |
| Lloyd Cornelius | Guyana | 135.0 | 16 | 21.12 | 1 | 0 | 6/56 |
| Vanburn Holder | Barbados | 151.2 | 16 | 23.75 | 1 | 0 | 5/69 |
| Wes Hall | Trinidad and Tobago | 88.0 | 15 | 22.46 | 0 | 0 | 4/51 |
