= West Indian cricket team in India, Pakistan and Sri Lanka in 1974–75 =

International cricket tour

The West Indies cricket team, captained by Clive Lloyd, toured India, Sri Lanka and Pakistan from November 1974 to March 1975 and played a five-match Test series against the India national cricket team followed by a two-match series against the Pakistan national cricket team. West Indies won the series in India 3–2 and the series in Pakistan was drawn 0–0. In Sri Lanka, the West Indians played two internationals against the Sri Lanka national cricket team which had not then achieved Test status; therefore, the internationals played at the Colombo Cricket Club Ground and the Paikiasothy Saravanamuttu Stadium, both in Colombo, are classified as first-class matches. India was captained by Mansoor Ali Khan Pataudi, Pakistan by Intikhab Alam and Sri Lanka by Anura Tennekoon.

== Test series summary ==
=== India ===
==== First Test ====
22–27 November 1974
(5-day match)
Scorecard

| West Indies | v | India |
| 289 (95.2 overs); AI Kallicharran 124; S Venkataraghavan 4/75 (30 overs) | | 260 (83.5 overs); HS Kanitkar 65; VA Holder 3/37 (20.5 overs) |
| 356/6d (83 overs); CH Lloyd 163 (149); S Venkataraghavan 2/79 (21 overs) | | 118 (42.5 overs); GR Viswanath 22; BP Patel 22; AME Roberts 3/24 (10.5 overs) |

West Indies won by 267 runs
M. Chinnaswamy Stadium, Bangalore
Umpires: MV Nagendra and J Reuben

- India won the toss and elected to field.
- 25 November was taken as a rest day.
- HS Kanitkar (IND), and CG Greenidge and IVA Richards (WIN) made their Test debuts.

==== Second Test ====
11–15 December 1974
(5-day match)
Scorecard

| India | v | West Indies |
| 220 (86.3 overs); PH Sharma 54; AME Roberts 3/51 (17.3 overs) | | 493 (141 overs); IVA Richards 192*; EAS Prasanna 4/147 (34 overs) |
| 256 (96.5 overs); FM Engineer 75; LR Gibbs 6/76 (40.5 overs) |

West Indies won by an innings and 17 runs
Feroz Shah Kotla Ground, Delhi
Umpires: MV Gothoskar and B Satyaji Rao

- India won the toss and elected to bat.
- 13 December was taken as a rest day.
- The match was scheduled for five days but completed in four.
- PH Sharma (IND) made his Test debut.

==== Third Test ====
27 December 1974–1 January 1975
(5-day match)
Scorecard

| India | v | West Indies |
| 233 (80.3 overs); GR Viswanath 52; AME Roberts 5/50 (19.3 overs) | | 240 (81.1 overs); RC Fredericks 100; Madan Lal 4/22 (16.1 overs) |
| 316 (143.2 overs); GR Viswanath 139 (263); VA Holder 3/61 (27.2 overs) | | 224 (84.2 overs); AI Kallicharran 57; BS Bedi 4/52 (26.2 overs) |

India won by 85 runs
Eden Gardens, Calcutta
Umpires: J Reuben and HP Sharma

- India won the toss and elected to bat.
- 30 December was taken as a rest day.
- AD Gaekwad and KD Ghavri (both IND) made their Test debuts.

==== Fourth Test ====
11–15 January 1975
(5-day match)
Scorecard

| India | v | West Indies |
| 190 (58.5 overs); GR Viswanath 97*; AME Roberts 7/64 (20.5 overs) | | 192 (59.2 overs); IVA Richards 50; EAS Prasanna 5/70 (23 overs) |
| 256 (104.4 overs); AD Gaekwad 80; AME Roberts 5/57 (21.4 overs) | | 154 (67 overs); AI Kallicharran 51; EAS Prasanna 4/41 (24 overs) |

India won by 100 runs
Madras Cricket Club Ground, Madras
Umpires: B Satyaji Rao and MS Sivasankariah

- India won the toss and elected to bat.
- 13 January was taken as a rest day.
- The match was scheduled for five days but completed in four.

==== Fifth Test ====
23–29 January 1975
(6-day match)
Scorecard

| West Indies | v | India |
| 604/6d (161 overs); CH Lloyd 242*; KD Ghavri 4/140 (35 overs) | | 406 (181.1 overs); ED Solkar 102; LR Gibbs 7/98 (59 overs) |
| 205/3d (40 overs); CG Greenidge 54; KD Ghavri 2/92 (17 overs) | | 202 (77.1 overs); BP Patel 73*; VA Holder 6/39 (20.1 overs) |

West Indies won by 201 runs
Wankhede Stadium, Bombay
Umpires: MV Nagendra and J Reuben

- West Indies won the toss and elected to bat.
- 26 January was taken as a rest day.

=== Pakistan ===
==== First Test ====
15 – 20 February 1975
Scorecard

| Pakistan | v | West Indies |
| 199 (59.4 overs); Asif Masood 30*; AME Roberts 5/66 (23 overs) | | 214 (61.5 overs); AI Kallicharran 92*; Sarfraz Nawaz 6/89 (27 overs) |
| 373/7d (94.6 overs); Mushtaq Mohammad 123; AME Roberts 4/121 (26 overs) | | 258/4 (69 overs); L Baichan 105*; Intikhab Alam 2/61 (18 overs) |

Match drawn
Gaddafi Stadium, Lahore
Umpires: Amanullah Khan and Shakoor Rana

- West Indies won the toss and elected to field.
- 18 February was taken as a rest day.
- Agha Zahid (PAK) and L Baichan (WIN) made their Test debuts.

==== Second Test ====
1 – 6 March 1975
Scorecard

| Pakistan | v | West Indies |
| 406/8d (94 overs); Wasim Raja 107*; LR Gibbs 3/89 (26 overs) | | 493 (103.1 overs); AI Kallicharran 115; Intikhab Alam 3/122 (28 overs) |
| 256 (99.1 overs); Sadiq Mohammad 98*; LR Gibbs 2/49 (37.1 overs) | | 1/0 (1 over); Extras 1 |

Match drawn
National Stadium, Karachi
Umpires: Amanullah Khan and Mahboob Shah

- Pakistan won the toss and elected to bat.
- 4 March was taken as a rest day.
- Liaqat Ali (PAK) made his Test debut.
