= 1968–69 Shell Shield season =

Cricket tournament

- Dates: 17 January – 6 March 1969
- Administrator: WICB
- Cricket format: First-class (four-day)
- Tournament format: Round-robin
- Champions: Jamaica (1st title)
- Participants: 6
- Matches: 10
- Most runs: (Barbados) Robin Bynoe (421)
- Most wickets: (Guyana) Philbert Blair (23)

The 1968–69 Shell Shield season was the third edition of what is now the Regional Four Day Competition, the domestic first-class cricket competition for the countries of the West Indies Cricket Board (WICB). The tournament was sponsored by Royal Dutch Shell, with matches played from 17 January to 6 March 1969.

Six teams contested the tournament – Barbados, British Guiana, Jamaica, the Leeward Islands, Trinidad and Tobago, and the Windward Islands. The Leeward and Windward Islands both played fewer matches than the other teams, although the results from their matches still counted towards the title. Three teams – Jamaica, Trinidad and Tobago, and Barbados – were undefeated (either winning or drawing all their matches), but Jamaica had more points than the other teams, thus winning their inaugural title. Barbadian batsman Robin Bynoe led the tournament in runs, while Guyanese pace bowler Philbert Blair was the leading wicket-taker.

== Points table ==
Team	Pld	W	L	DWF	DLF	DNC	Pts
Jamaica	4	1	0	2	0	1	24
Trinidad and Tobago	4	1	0	1	2	0	22
Barbados	4	1	0	0	3	0	18
Guyana	4	0	2	2	0	0	12
Leeward Islands	2	1	1	0	0	0	12
Windward Islands	2	0	1	0	0	1	0
Source: CricketArchive

Key

- W – Outright win (12 points)
- L – Outright loss (0 points)
- DWF – Drawn, but won first innings (6 points)
- DLF – Drawn, but lost first innings (2 points)
- DNC – Drawn, with both first innings not completed (0 points)
- P – Total points

== Statistics ==
=== Most runs ===
The top five run-scorers are included in this table, listed by runs scored and then by batting average.

Player	Team	Runs	Inns	Avg	Highest	100s	50s
Robin Bynoe	Barbados	421	7	60.14	114	1	3
Renford Pinnock	Jamaica	346	6	69.20	175	2	1
Peter Lashley	Barbados	318	7	45.42	94	0	3
Maurice Foster	Jamaica	302	6	50.33	135	2	0
Joe Solomon	Guyana	281	5	56.20	169	1	0

=== Most wickets ===
The top five wicket-takers are listed in this table, listed by wickets taken and then by bowling average.

Player	Team	Overs	Wkts	Ave	5	10	BBI
Philbert Blair	Guyana	149.0	23	21.26	2	0	5/60
Vanburn Holder	Barbados	134.0	19	15.78	0	0	3/14
George Rock	Barbados	124.1	18	16.05	1	0	6/18
Willie Rodriguez	Trinidad and Tobago	87.3	17	14.17	2	0	6/30
Lloyd Cornelius	Guyana	128.2	17	32.94	2	0	6/104
