= West Indian cricket team in England in 1969 =

International cricket tour

The West Indies cricket team toured England in the 1969 season to play a three-match Test series against England. England won the series 2–0 with one match drawn. After this, England would not win another test series against the West Indies for 31 years.

The West Indian tour was scheduled for the first half of the English cricket season, and the weather for much of May 1969 was damp and cold. A second touring side, from New Zealand, played three Tests against England in the second half of the season – see the article New Zealand cricket team in England in 1969.

== The West Indies team ==
The touring team was captained by Gary Sobers. Lance Gibbs was the vice-captain, although Basil Butcher acted as captain in a couple of the matches.

The full team was:

- Gary Sobers, captain
- Lance Gibbs, vice-captain
- Philbert Blair
- Basil Butcher
- Steve Camacho
- Joey Carew
- Charlie Davis
- Michael Findlay
- Maurice Foster
- Roy Fredericks
- Jackie Hendriks
- Vanburn Holder
- Clive Lloyd
- Pascall Roberts
- John Shepherd
- Grayson Shillingford

Only five players – Sobers, Gibbs, Butcher, Carew and Hendriks – had been on the previous tour of England in 1966. There were seven players with no previous Test experience in the party: five of them – Findlay, Foster, Holder, Shepherd and Shillingford – made their Test debuts in this series. The other two, Blair and Roberts, never played Test match cricket.

Notable absentees were Rohan Kanhai (injured) and wicketkeeper Deryck Murray, who would not be released for the full tour by Nottinghamshire.

== The Test Matches ==
=== First Test at Old Trafford, June 12–17, 1969 ===
12–17 June 1969
Scorecard

England	v	West Indies
413 (197.5 overs); G Boycott 128; JN Shepherd 5/104 (58.5 overs)		147 (48 overs); CA Davis 34; DJ Brown 4/39 (13 overs)
12/0 (4.5 overs); JH Edrich 9*		275 (f/o) (114.3 overs); RA Fredericks 64; DJ Brown 3/59 (22 overs)

England won by 10 wickets
Old Trafford, Manchester
Umpires: JS Buller and CS Elliott

- England won the toss and elected to bat.
- 15 June was taken as a rest day
- MLC Foster, JN Shepherd and VA Holder (all WIN) made their Test debuts.

England's success was built on 128 from Geoffrey Boycott, who shared a 112 opening partnership with John Edrich (58) and a third wicket 128 with Tom Graveney, who scored 75 in his 79th and final Test, during which he was 42 years old. West Indies dropped eight catches on the first day alone. Basil D'Oliveira (51) and the tail took the total beyond 400 and West Indies were soon five for two with both openers gone. David Brown and John Snow each took four wickets and no West Indian batsman reached 35. England captain Ray Illingworth enforced the follow-on, and despite consistent batting by the upper order, with 64 from Fredericks, 44 from Carew, 48 from Butcher and 48 also from Sobers, the deficit was only just cleared.

=== Second Test at Lord's, June 26-July 1, 1969 ===
26 June–1 July 1969
Scorecard

West Indies	v	England
380 (158 overs); CA Davis 103; JA Snow 5/114 (39 overs)		344 (157.4 overs); R Illingworth 113; JN Shepherd 3/74 (43 overs)
295/9d (100.5 overs); CH Lloyd 70; R Illingworth 3/66 (27 overs)		295/7 (106 overs); G Boycott 106; GC Shillingford 2/30 (13 overs)

Match drawn
Lord's, London
Umpires: JS Buller and AE Fagg

- West Indies won the toss and elected to bat.
- 29 June was taken as a rest day
- TM Findlay and GC Shillingford (both WIN), and JH Hampshire (ENG) made their Test debuts.

Batsmen dominated in sunny conditions. West Indies opened with 106 from Camacho (67) and Fredericks (63) and Davis hit 103 in 375 minutes. At 61 for five, England were in trouble, but debutant John Hampshire hit 107 and shared a 128-run sixth wicket partnership with Alan Knott, and then captain Ray Illingworth hit his first Test century, 113, and John Snow contributed only nine to a last-wicket partnership of 84. West Indies batted brightly, with Fredericks making 60 and Lloyd 70, and Sobers, batting with a runner, contributed an unbeaten 50 before declaring, setting England 332 to win in five hours. They made too slow a start, so that when Phil Sharpe (86) and opener Boycott (106) accelerated with a partnership of 126 in 90 minutes, they had left too little time to complete the task.

=== Third Test at Headingley, July 10–15, 1969 ===
10–15 July 1969
Scorecard

England	v	West Indies
223 (98 overs); JH Edrich 79; VA Holder 4/48 (26 overs)		161 (64.3 overs); BF Butcher 35; VA Holder 35; BR Knight 4/63 (22 overs)
240 (131.4 overs); BL D'Oliveira 39; GS Sobers 5/42 (40 overs)		272 (106.2 overs); BF Butcher 91; DL Underwood 4/55 (22 overs)

England won by 30 runs
Headingley, Leeds
Umpires: CS Elliott and AE Fagg

- England won the toss and elected to bat.
- 13 July was taken as a rest day

A slow pitch and damp conditions favoured the bowlers. Edrich's 79 and 40s from D'Oliveira and Knott led England to 223, but no West Indian managed more than 35. Shepherd was unable to bat in West Indies' first innings and could not bowl in England's second, where all players except Boycott made 15 or more, but none reached 40. Set 303 to win in better conditions, West Indies looked to be on course when Camacho, with 71, and Butcher (91) put on 108 for the third wicket, which fell at 177. At 219 for three, Butcher, Sobers (for a duck), Lloyd and Shepherd went for the addition of just nine runs and the tail was able to prolong the match only an hour into the last day.

== See also ==
- Playfair Cricket Annual, 1970 edition
- Wisden Cricketers' Almanack, 1970 edition
