= Lloyd Cornelius =

Guyanese cricketer

Personal information
- Full name: Lloyd Malcolm Cornelius
- Born: 19 February 1943; Anna Regina, British Guiana
- Batting: Right-handed
- Bowling: Right-arm off-spin

Domestic team information
- Years: Team
- 1967–1971: Guyana
- Source: CricketArchive, 2 April 2016

Lloyd Malcolm Cornelius (born 19 February 1943) is a former Guyanese cricketer who represented the Guyanese national team in West Indian domestic cricket. He was a right-arm off-spin bowler and a competent lower-order batsman.

Cornelius was born in Anna Regina, in what is now Guyana's Pomeroon-Supenaam region. He made his first-class debut for Guyana during the 1966–67 Shell Shield season, against Barbados. He had little success as a bowler during his debut season, taking five wickets from three matches, but against Jamaica scored 60 runs from seventh in the batting order, which was to be the highest score of his first-class career. During the 1968–69 season, Cornelius took 17 wickets from four matches, and was the fifth biggest wicket taker for the competition, behind only Philbert Blair among his teammates. His season included two five-wicket hauls – 5/67 against Jamaica and 6/104 against the Leeward Islands. During the 1969–70 season, Cornelius finished as the leading wicket-taker for Guyana and third overall, with 16 wickets from his four games. Against the Combined Islands, he took the best figures of his career, 6/56 from 29 overs. Despite his successes, Cornelius played only one further season for Guyana, with his last first-class appearance coming in March 1971, against the touring Indians. He finished with exactly 50 wickets from his 15 first-class matches.
