= Super50 Cup =

West Indies domestic one-day cricket competition

- Countries: West Indies
- Administrator: Cricket West Indies
- Format: List-A
- First edition: 1972–73
- Latest edition: 2025–26
- Next edition: 2026–27
- Tournament format: Group stage and knockout
- Number of teams: 6
- Current champion: Barbados Pride (9th title)
- Most successful: Trinidad and Tobago (14 titles)

The Super50 Cup, currently named the CG Insurance Super50 Cup for sponsorship purposes is the domestic one-day cricket competition in the West Indies. It was previously known as the KFC Cup until the fast food chain pulled out of sponsorship in 2008 and the WICB Cup until 2011. Afterwards it was known as the Regional Super50 until 2014 when NAGICO Insurance became the title sponsor and it became the NAGICO Regional Super50 until 2021. In recent years it has been run in a condensed format with the group stage taking place over approximately two to three weeks, immediately followed by the knock-out stages. Trinidad and Tobago have won the most titles – 14, including one shared).

== Competing teams ==
Twenty-five teams have participated in at least one edition of the competition, with Barbados, Guyana, Jamaica, and Trinidad and Tobago the only teams to have participated in every edition. The Leeward Islands and Windward Islands have competed in every tournament except for four and three tournaments respectively when they were variously divided into other teams such as Antigua and Barbuda, Saint Vincent and the Grenadines, Rest of the Leeward Islands, Rest of the Windward Islands or Northern Windward Islands and Southern Windward Islands.

Current teams (2025–26)

- Barbados
- Guyana
- Jamaica
- Leeward Islands
- Trinidad and Tobago
- Windward Islands

Former teams (number of seasons)

- Antigua and Barbuda (3)
- Bermuda (5)
- Canada (9)
- Cayman Islands (1)
- (Cricket West Indies) Combined Campuses and Colleges
- Hampshire (1)
- Ireland (1)
- Kent (2)
- Saint Vincent and the Grenadines (1)
- Northern Windward Islands (1)
- Rest of Leeward Islands (3)
- ICC Americas (2)
- United States (5)
- Rest of Windward Islands (1)
- Southern Windward Islands (1)
- West Indies U19
- (Cricket West Indies) University of the West Indies (2)
- (Cricket West Indies) West Indies Academy
- (Cricket West Indies) West Indies High Performance Centre (2)
- (Cricket West Indies) West Indies B

== History ==
The first official senior limited overs game in the West Indies was played on 18 March 1970, between a touring Duke of Norfolk's XI and the Barbados team. Three years later, a trial knock-out tournament named the Banks Trophy—which has been given List A status—was arranged between Barbados, Guyana, Jamaica and Trinidad and Tobago, and Barbados beat Guyana in the final by nine runs.

Then, there were no more official one-day competitions until February 1976, when the first official one-day tournament named the Gillette Cup was held between the four teams making up the Banks Trophy, along with the Leeward Islands and the Windward Islands. The Gillette Cup had two groups of three teams, each playing each other once, with the winners progressing to the final. Barbados and Trinidad and Tobago, who also shared the 1975–76 Shell Shield, won their groups and met up in the final which Barbados won by 43 runs at Kensington Oval. During the subsequent season, those two said teams eventually faced off in the final, where once again Barbados prevailed.

The next season, the tournament was renamed the Geddes Grant/Harrison Line Trophy, named after two large shipping companies in the area, with Leeward Islands and Jamaica progressing from the two groups. However, the final, scheduled to be held at the Antigua Recreation Ground on 8 April 1977, was rained off, and the teams shared the trophy. A shared trophy has happened twice more in the history of the tournament. Three more teams became winners in the next four seasons, before Jamaica began a row of finals appearances, starting with qualifying for the 1982–83 final. They then turned up in six successive finals from 1983 to 1988, winning three of them to pass Barbados on the all-time winners list.

In 1988–89 the tournament was renamed to the Geddes Grant Shield, and with that, Jamaica's run of finals appearances was ended, as they were knocked out by Windward Islands on run rate per wicket lost. The Windward Islands went on to the final with Guyana, and after being set 155 to win, they lost their first three wickets for five runs. Opener Darwin Telemaque then put on 43 with captain Julian Charles before retiring hurt, and two wickets from Guyana captain Roger Harper sent the Windwards to 85 for 6. Needing 70, and with only three men left, Telemaque returned – only to have two of his partners run out, and the Windwards were 99 for 8. Telemaque stuck in, however, adding 39 with Ian Allen, before number 11 Dominique Lewis came in to bat in his List A debut with 17 needed. It came down to the last over, and the Windwards managed to take the winning runs, becoming one-wicket victors.

The next tournaments were not as close, although Jamaica's win in 1990–91—their fourth in eight seasons, and their last for a further eight—also came down to the last over, but then with four wickets in hand. Then, in 1992–93 the era of the Leeward Islands began. They won three successive titles—admittedly with the first one rained off, but the next two won outright—before fading back to last place in their three-team group in 1995–96, beaten by the two teams who would later try to contest the final, but had to share the trophy due to rain. The tournament was also renamed in 1994–95, becoming the Shell/Sandals Trophy.

The next season saw two new teams for the first time, as Bermuda and Canada joined, but both finished bottom of their groups with neither managing to win any of their six games. Trinidad and Tobago won the tournament, and also reached the semi-finals of the next season's tournament, which was named the Red Stripe Bowl after the beer brand Red Stripe. The tournament was won by the Leeward Islands while Bermuda and Canada once again went winless.

By the end of the 1990s, the Red Stripe Bowl had been established as an early-season feature, where the semi-finals and finals being held in Jamaica and Busta Cup games commencing after tournament's completion. Jamaica won the 20th century's last regional one day tournament after prevailing over the Leeward Islands in the final. 2000–01 saw two more teams invited, with the United States beating Barbados by two wickets, a result that didn't prevent the Americans coming last in the group. The Windward Islands won, their second title after beating rivals the Leeward Islands in the final. The 2001–02 season saw all four non-first class teams excluded, and instead the Island teams were split—Leeward Islands were divided into Antigua and Barbuda and the Rest, while the Windward Islands were divided into a North and a South group. All four teams finished in third or fourth place of their respective four-team groups, as Guyana won the title.

The next season saw even more changes. The North and South approach for the Windwards was scrapped, and it was instead split into a team for Saint Vincent and the Grenadines and another for the Rest of the Windward Islands, a University of the West Indies team was introduced, and Canada returned. Canada nearly got to the semi-finals in their group game against Trinidad and Tobago. However, they were bowled out for 55 in a 175-run defeat to finish third in their group. T&T was later knocked out at the semi-final stage, while Barbados went on to win. The next season saw St Vincent compete with the Windward Islands again, while the West Indies Under-19 team replaced them—they finished fourth in their five-team group, and once again the four nation teams qualified for the final, with Guyana beating Barbados.

The 2004–05 tournament saw a change to a format that's held for the last two seasons. The tournament—named the Regional One-Day Tournament for lack of a sponsor—was now held in Guyana and Barbados instead of Jamaica, and the traditional six teams competed, with Guyana reaching the final but falling to Trinidad and Tobago. The next season saw a change of name to the KFC Cup, which Guyana won via the Duckworth-Lewis method. Since the umpires stopped the game after the 49th over with two runs to get. The Guyanese team had been offered the light earlier, but not realising they were ahead on Duckworth-Lewis, they chose to bat on, and it was enough to win the game.

In December 2013, NAGICO Insurance was announced as the new title sponsor of the Regional Super50 with the winning team taking home the Clive Lloyd Trophy – named in honour of the former West Indies captain. In 2014, the WICB approved major changes to the regional domestic cricket structure, including extending the first-class season, fully professionalizing the first-class and list A game with six territorial boards contracting 15 players each for the extended season and an extending the regional 50-over competition to provide players with more opportunities to get experience, accumulate runs and wickets so they can stake a claim for a spot in the regional side. In February 2019 Bermuda based Colonial Group International was announced as the new title sponsors of the regional one day competition now dubbed the CG Insurance Super 50.

== Current structure ==
The NAGICO Regional Super50 of 2013–14 had an initial twelve-day preliminary round with two zones (A and B) of four teams each. Within each zone the teams played a round-robin format, where each team played three fixtures. The top two teams from each group then progressed to the semi-finals, with number one in zone A playing number two from Zone B and number two from Zone A playing number one from zone B, and the winners of the semi-finals faced off in the final for the trophy. All matches were played in Trinidad & Tobago.

Points awarded at the round robin stage:

- 4 points for a win
- 2 points for a tie
- 0 points for a loss
- 1 bonus point for wins where the net run rate of the winner was 1.25 times that of the opposition. A team's run rate will be calculated by reference to the runs scored in an innings divided by the number of overs faced.

== Winners ==
Season	Winner	Runner-up	Most runs	Most wickets	Ref
1972–73	Barbados	Guyana	(Guyana) Clive Lloyd	(Jamaica) Arthur Barrett	
1975–76	Barbados	Trinidad and Tobago	(Barbados) Gordon Greenidge	(Barbados) Wayne Daniel	
1976–77	Barbados	Trinidad and Tobago	(Trinidad and Tobago) Larry Gomes	(Barbados) Joel Garner	
1977–78	Jamaica; Leeward Islands	None (Title Shared)	(Antigua and Barbuda) Michael Camacho	(Antigua and Barbuda) Ulysses Lawrence	
1978–79	Trinidad and Tobago	Barbados	(Trinidad and Tobago) Larry Gomes	(Trinidad and Tobago) Alec Burns	
1979–80	Guyana	Leeward Islands	(Guyana) Timur Mohamed	(Nevis) Derick Parry	
1980–81	Trinidad and Tobago	Barbados	(Barbados) Thelston Payne	(Trinidad and Tobago) Alec Burns	
1981–82	Leeward Islands	Barbados	(Dominica) Lockhart Sebastien	(Antigua and Barbuda) Eldine Baptiste	
1982–83	Guyana	Jamaica	(Guyana) Faoud Bacchus	(Guyana) Garfield Charles	
1983–84	Jamaica	Leeward Islands	(Jamaica) Mark Neita	(Jamaica) Courtney Walsh	
1984–85	Guyana	Jamaica	(Barbados) Terry Hunte	(Jamaica) Aaron Daley	
1985–86	Jamaica	Leeward Islands	(Barbados) Thelston Payne	(Jamaica) Aaron Daley	
1986–87	Jamaica	Barbados	(Barbados) Carlisle Best	(Barbados) Dale Ellcock	
1987–88	Barbados	Jamaica	(Barbados) Carlisle Best	(Barbados) Joel Garner	
1988–89	Windward Islands	Guyana	(Saint Vincent and the Grenadines) Dawnley Joseph	(Jamaica) Courtney Walsh	
1989–90	Trinidad and Tobago	Barbados	(Trinidad and Tobago) Phil Simmons	(Trinidad and Tobago) Richard Sieuchan	
1990–91	Jamaica	Leeward Islands	(Antigua and Barbuda) Richie Richardson	(Saint Vincent and the Grenadines) Cameron Cuffy	
1991–92	Trinidad and Tobago	Barbados	(Barbados) Carlisle Best	(Trinidad and Tobago) Tony Gray	
1992–93	Guyana; Leeward Islands	None (Title Shared)	(Saint Vincent and the Grenadines) Dawnley Joseph	(Guyana) Roger Harper	
1993–94	Leeward Islands	Barbados	(Barbados) Sherwin Campbell	(Trinidad and Tobago) Rajindra Dhanraj	
1994–95	Leeward Islands	Barbados	(Guyana) Carl Hooper	(Barbados) Hendy Bryan	
1995–96	Guyana; Trinidad and Tobago	None (Title Shared)	(Guyana) Carl Hooper	(Guyana) Shivnarine Chanderpaul	
1996–97	Trinidad and Tobago	Guyana	(Trinidad and Tobago) Brian Lara	(Trinidad and Tobago) Rajindra Dhanraj	
1997–98	Leeward Islands	Guyana	(Nevis) Keith Arthurton	(Antigua and Barbuda) Kenny Benjamin	
1998–99	Guyana	Leeward Islands	(Guyana) Shivnarine Chanderpaul	(Trinidad and Tobago) Dinanath Ramnarine	
1999–00	Jamaica	Leeward Islands	(Antigua and Barbuda) Sylvester Joseph	(Guyana) Neil McGarrell	
2000–01	Windward Islands	Leeward Islands	(Grenada) Junior Murray	(Saint Vincent and the Grenadines) Nixon McLean	
2001–02	Guyana	Barbados	(Jamaica) Chris Gayle	(Barbados) Hendy Bryan	
2002–03	Barbados	Jamaica	(Barbados) Floyd Reifer	(Trinidad and Tobago) Merv Dillon	
2003–04	Guyana	Barbados	(Guyana) Ramnaresh Sarwan	(Trinidad and Tobago) Dinanath Ramnarine	
2004–05	Trinidad and Tobago	Guyana	(Nevis) Runako Morton	(Trinidad and Tobago) Imran Jan	
2005–06	Guyana	Barbados	(Guyana) Ramnaresh Sarwan	(Barbados) Corey Collymore	
2006–07	Trinidad and Tobago	Windward Islands	(Trinidad and Tobago) Kieron Pollard	(Jamaica) Jermaine Lawson	
2007–08	Jamaica	Trinidad and Tobago	(Jamaica) Chris Gayle	(Jamaica) Jerome Taylor	
2008–09	Trinidad and Tobago	Barbados	(Barbados) Dwayne Smith	(Dominica) Liam Sebastien	
2009–10	Trinidad and Tobago	Guyana	(Guyana) Narsingh Deonarine	(Trinidad and Tobago) Dwayne Bravo	
2010–11	Barbados; Leeward Islands	None (Title Shared)	(Antigua and Barbuda) Wilden Cornwall	(Barbados) Ryan Hinds	
2011–12	Jamaica	Trinidad and Tobago	(Trinidad and Tobago) Jason Mohammed	(Trinidad and Tobago) Sunil Narine	
2012–13	Windward Islands	(Cricket West Indies) Combined Campuses	(Grenada) Devon Smith	(Dominica) Shane Shillingford	
2013–14	Barbados	Trinidad and Tobago	(Barbados) Dwayne Smith	(Trinidad and Tobago) Rayad Emrit	
2014–15	Trinidad and Tobago	Guyana	(Trinidad and Tobago) Jason Mohammed	(Trinidad and Tobago) Sunil Narine	
2015–16	Trinidad and Tobago	Barbados	(Trinidad and Tobago) Darren Bravo	(Barbados) Sulieman Benn	
2016–17	Barbados	Jamaica	(Nevis) Kieran Powell	(Barbados) Ashley Nurse	
2017–18	Windward Islands	Barbados	(Barbados) Roston Chase	(Dominica) Shane Shillingford	
2018–19	(Cricket West Indies) Combined Campuses	Guyana	(Barbados) Jonathan Carter	(Canada) Romesh Eranga/ (Cricket West Indies) Yannick Ottley	
2019–20	(Cricket West Indies) West Indies Emerging Team	Leeward Islands	(Nevis) Kieron Powell	(Saint Kitts and Nevis) Sheeno Berridge	
2020–21	Trinidad and Tobago	Guyana	(Trinidad and Tobago) Jason Mohammed	(Guyana) Gudakesh Motie	
2022–23	Jamaica	Trinidad and Tobago	(Jamaica) Rovman Powell	(Trinidad and Tobago) Shannon Gabriel/ (Jamaica) Odean Smith/ (Jamaica) Nicholson Gordon	
2023–24	Trinidad and Tobago	Leeward Islands	(Trinidad and Tobago) Darren Bravo (416)	(Trinidad and Tobago) Sunil Narine (20)	
2024–25	None (Both Sides Forfeited)		(Trinidad and Tobago) Amir Jangoo (446)	(Antigua and Barbuda) Rahkeem Cornwall (23)	

== Number of wins by team (since 1972–73) ==
Team	Wins	Last
Trinidad and Tobago	13 (plus 1 shared)	2023–24
Jamaica	8 (plus 1 shared)	2022–23
Guyana	7 (plus 2 shared)	2005–06
Barbados	8 (plus 1 shared)	2025–26
Leeward Islands	4 (plus 3 shared)	2010–11
Windward Islands	4	2017–18
(Cricket West Indies) Combined C&C	1	2018–19
(Cricket West Indies) West Indies Academy	1	2019–20

== Most successful captains ==
Captain	Wins
Daren Ganga	4 (2004, 2006, 2008, 2009)
Carl Hooper	3 (1995, 1998, 2001)
Brian Lara	3 (1990, 1995, 1996)
Shivnarine Chanderpaul	2 (2003, 2005)
Chris Gayle	2 (2007, 2011)
Michael Holding	2 (1984, 1986)
David Holford	2 (1976, 1977)
Deryck Murray	2 (1979, 1981)
Viv Richards	2 (1978, 1982)
Richie Richardson	2 (1994, 1995)
Courtney Walsh	2 (1991, 1999)
Darren Bravo	1 (2023)
