= Alec Burns =

Alec Burns may refer to:

- Alec Burns (cricketer) (born 1948), Trinidad and Tobago and East Trinidad cricketer
- Alec Burns (runner) (1907–2003), English track and field athlete
