= Arthurton =

Arthurton is a surname. Notable people with the surname include:

- Ed Arthurton (born 1947), Nevisian cricketer
- Keith Arthurton (born 1965), Nevisian cricketer

== See also ==
- Arthurton, South Australia
