= Ulysses Lawrence =

Antiguan cricketer (born 1954)

Personal information
- Full name: Ulysses Vincent Conroy Lawrence
- Born: 11 July 1954 (age 72); Antigua
- Batting: Right-handed
- Bowling: Right-arm medium-pace

Domestic team information
- Years: Team
- 1977-78 to 1984-85: Leeward Islands
- 1978-79 to 1980-81: Combined Leeward and Windward Islands

Career statistics
Competition	First-class	List A
Matches	13	14
Runs scored	385	167
Batting average	18.33	33.40
100s/50s	0/0	0/0
Top score	49	47
Balls bowled	1786	764
Wickets	21	21
Bowling average	35.90	22.66
5 wickets in innings	0	0
10 wickets in match	0	n/a
Best bowling	4/51	4/33
Catches/stumpings	9/–	7/–
- Source: Cricinfo, 13 July 2019

Ulysses Vincent Conroy Lawrence (born 11 July 1954) is a former cricketer who played first-class and List A cricket for Leeward Islands from 1977 to 1985.

Lawrence was a medium-pace bowler and useful lower-order batsman. He top-scored for Leeward Islands in both of their unsuccessful appearances in the final of the Geddes Grant/Harrison Line Trophy in 1979-80 and 1983-84. His all-round performances won him the man of the match award twice in the Geddes Grant/Harrison Line Trophy, in 1977-78 and 1983-84.
