= Ed Arthurton =

Nevisian cricketer

Personal information
- Born: 1947 (age 78–79); Charlestown, Nevis
- Nickname: "Gooner"
- Role: All-rounder

Domestic team information
- Years: Team
- 1969–1971: Leeward Islands

Career statistics
Competition	FC
Matches	4
Runs scored	102
Batting average	17.00
100s/50s	0/0
Top score	45*
Balls bowled	667
Wickets	10
Bowling average	28.20
5 wickets in innings	0
10 wickets in match	0
Best bowling	3/35
Catches/stumpings	1/-
- Source: CricketArchive, 10 February 2013

Ed Arthurton (Note: Sources give Arthurton's full first name as either Edmund or Edward) (born 1947) is a former Nevisian cricketer.

Arthurton was born in Charlestown, the island's capital, and was a regular player for Nevis in inter-island matches from the late 1960s onwards. He made his first-class debut for the Leeward Islands during the 1968–69 Shell Shield season, playing two matches in January 1969. A fast bowler, Arthurton opened the bowling with Donald Richards in both innings, and in the second match, against Guyana, took five wickets, including career-best figures of 3/35 in the side's first innings. His two further matches at first-class level both came during the 1970–71 season, against the Windward Islands and the touring Indians. In what was to be his final match for the Leewards, Arthurton opened the bowling with Andy Roberts in both innings, who went on to take over 200 wickets for the West Indies. Arthurton continued to play representative cricket for Nevis into the early 1980s, and has been noted as "responsible for lifting the standards of Nevis cricket to a new and positive high". In a contest held by a local radio station in December 2010 to name an "all-time Nevis cricket team", he was named captain of the side.
