= Rusi Jeejeebhoy =

Indian cricketer (born 1942)

Personal information
- Full name: Rusi Ardeshir Jeejeebhoy
- Born: 2 December 1942 (age 83); Calcutta, India
- Batting: Right-handed
- Role: Wicket-keeper

Domestic team information
- Years: Team
- 1965-66 to 1972-73: Bengal
- 1970-71 to 1973-74: East Zone

Career statistics
Competition	First-class
Matches	46
Runs scored	496
Batting average	10.33
100s/50s	0/0
Top score	39*
Balls bowled	30
Wickets	1
Bowling average	31.00
5 wickets in innings	0
10 wickets in match	0
Best bowling	1/22
Catches/stumpings	104/30
- Source: Cricinfo, 26 August 2019

Rusi Ardeshir Jeejeebhoy (born 2 December 1942) is an Indian former cricketer. He played first-class cricket for Bengal between 1965 and 1973. Jeejeebhoy was born into a Parsi family and was educated at Calcutta Boys' School and the University of Calcutta. He toured the West Indies in 1970-71 as India's reserve wicket-keeper, but did not play Test cricket.

== See also ==
- List of Bengal cricketers
