= Graham Barlow =

English cricketer (born 1950)

Personal information
- Full name: Graham Derek Barlow
- Born: 26 March 1950 (age 76); Folkestone, Kent, England
- Batting: Left-handed

International information
- National side: England
- Test debut (cap 470): 17 December 1976 v India
- Last Test: 16 June 1977 v Australia
- ODI debut (cap 32): 26 August 1976 v West Indies
- Last ODI: 6 June 1977 v Australia

Domestic team information
- Years: Team
- 1969–1986: Middlesex

Career statistics
Competition	Tests	ODIs	FC	LA
Matches	3	6	251	257
Runs scored	17	149	12,387	6,006
Batting average	4.25	29.80	35.90	27.55
100s/50s	0/0	0/1	26/58	5/33
Top score	7*	80*	177	158
Balls bowled	0	0	115	125
Wickets	–	–	3	6
Bowling average	–	–	22.66	19.16
5 wickets in innings	–	–	0	0
10 wickets in match	–	–	0	0
Best bowling	–	–	1/6	2/13
Catches/stumpings	0/–	4/–	136/–	91/–
- Source: Cricinfo, 1 January 2006

Graham Derek Barlow (born 26 March 1950) is a former cricketer and was a middle-order batsman for Middlesex and, briefly, for England.

== Early life ==
Educated at the former Ealing Grammar School for Boys (now Ealing, Hammersmith and West London College), Barlow was both a talented cricketer and rugby player in his youth. He has been capped for the England under-23 Rugby Union team.

== Career ==
A stylish, confident and powerful player, Barlow was an important figure in the powerhouse Middlesex team of the late 1970s and early 1980s under Mike Brearley (and later Mike Gatting), helping them to win the County Championship outright in 1976, 1980, 1982 and 1985, and to share it with Kent in 1977. He was described as a natural athlete, and his quick running between the wickets, often in partnership with the equally fleet of foot Clive Radley, and later in profitable partnerships with Wilf Slack, was a feature of his play. Barlow won many one-day games for his team, helping Middlesex to win the Gillette Cup in 1977 and 1980, the 1983 Benson & Hedges Cup and the 1984 NatWest Trophy. He was an outstanding fieldsman, ranked alongside Derek Randall and the youthful David Gower in the covers. He ran out many batsmen with a fine sense of anticipation, good ground coverage and a fast and accurate arm.

He played three Test matches, but was unable to play the major innings, which might have cemented himself in the England team. His debut One Day International saw his best innings, an unbeaten 80 against a strong West Indies side, but he struggled in five more ODIs after that. He made a strong start in the first-class matches of his 1976–77 tour to India, but could not translate that form into the Test arena. At the end of this tour he made a century in a match for the England XI against the Sri Lankans, but as Sri Lanka were five years short of Test status, this did not count towards his Test record. At the start of the 1977 Australia tour of England he top-scored for England in their first victory over Australia of the summer in a One Day International in Manchester, but he was dropped after another failure in the first Test of the summer. In five Test innings, Barlow never reached double figures, and defensive flaws saw him ultimately overlooked.

He continued as a prolific player for Middlesex, often opening the batting, but ironically for such a fit and athletic player his career was ended prematurely by a persistent back injury. He turned to coaching and, in 2001, moved to New Zealand, taking charge of the Central Districts Stags in 2004. He later resided in Whangārei, teaching.
