= Michael Carew =

Trinidadian cricketer (born 1966)

Michael Philip Carew (born 10 February 1966 in Trinidad) is a retired professional cricketer who played first-class and List A cricket for Trinidad and Tobago. He is the son of the former West Indies Test player Joey Carew.
