= John Lever =

English Test cricketer

Personal information
- Full name: John Kenneth Lever
- Born: 24 February 1949 (age 77); Stepney, London, England
- Batting: Right-handed
- Bowling: Left-arm fast-medium
- Role: Bowler

International information
- National side: England
- Test debut (cap 471): 17 December 1976 v India
- Last Test: 19 June 1986 v India
- ODI debut (cap 35): 26 August 1976 v West Indies
- Last ODI: 14 February 1982 v Sri Lanka

Domestic team information
- Years: Team
- 1967–1989: Essex
- 1982/83–1984/85: Natal
- 1990–1991: Cambridgeshire

Career statistics
Competition	Test	ODI	FC
Matches	21	22	529
Runs scored	306	56	3,678
Batting average	11.76	8.00	10.53
100s/50s	0/1	0/0	0/3
Top score	53	27*	91
Balls bowled	4,433	1,152	91,271
Wickets	73	24	1,722
Bowling average	26.72	29.70	24.25
5 wickets in innings	3	0	85
10 wickets in match	1	0	12
Best bowling	7/46	4/29	8/37
Catches/stumpings	11/–	6/–	187/–
- Source: Cricinfo, 10 March 2026

John Kenneth Lever MBE (born 24 February 1949) is an English former international cricketer who played Test and One Day International cricket for England. Lever was a left-arm fast-medium bowler who predominantly swung the ball into right-handed batsmen.

The cricket correspondent Colin Bateman remarked that "for 23 years he plied his trade with Essex, becoming the finest left-arm pace bowler in the country. Tough, astute, and entertaining in the dressing room, Lever was, as the title of his autobiography suggests, A Cricketer's Cricketer".

== Life and career ==
Lever is sometimes remembered for the Vaseline incident during the third test of his debut tour of India in 1976. It was one of the first publicised incidents of 'doctoring' (using unfair means to enhance the swing or seam abilities of the cricket ball by a bowler), when Lever was accused of rubbing vaseline onto one side of the ball so it would swing better. The claim was later rejected and Lever was cleared of any wrongdoing. In the first Test of that series against India in Delhi, Lever had recorded the best Test bowling figures for an English debutant (7–46), a record that stood until Dominic Cork beat it by three runs on his debut against the West Indies in 1995. Lever finished the match with bowling figures of 10–70, another English debutant's record, which he enhanced with a half century while giving banter.

Lever made his first-class debut for Essex in 1967 and would represent the county until 1989, in one of the most successful periods in the club's history.

He was also involved in the rebel tour to South Africa in 1982 during the apartheid era, where he formed strong links in the country. In the warm-up match against Western Province, Lever broke down after bowling two balls, and subsequent X-rays showed a curvature in his spine. The discovery came as a surprise to Lever, who had bowled with a sore back for the best part of a decade. However, with an exercise regime in place to strengthen the back, Lever would recover in time to be available for the first unofficial Test match. He would later return to play a few matches for Natal in the Currie Cup.

Due to his involvement in the rebel tour, Lever was banned from representing England for three years, but continued to play well for Essex. The selectors recognized his form and selected him for one final Test cap against the touring Indians in 1986, at the age of 37. After England lost the first Test, Lever was picked for the second test at Headingley, replacing Richard Ellison. In India's first innings, Lever had Dilip Vengsarkar caught behind on 61, then trapped captain Kapil Dev in front next ball. He dismissed Kapil again in the second innings to finish his final bowling innings with 4/64. Chasing 408 to win, England were dismissed for 128, Lever falling to Maninder Singh to give India victory by 279 runs, and a series win.

Lever was appointed an MBE in the 1990 Birthday Honours for his services to cricket.

More recently, Lever taught physical education at Bancroft's School. In 2002, he joined ITC Sports Travel as a tour host, accompanying cricket fans all over the cricket world. In January 2026 he was appointed president of Essex County Cricket Club.
