= 2025–26 Super50 Cup =

Cricket tournament in the West Indies

- Dates: 19 – 29 November 2025
- Administrator: Cricket West Indies
- Cricket format: List A (50 overs)
- Tournament format(s): Group stage and final
- Host: Trinidad and Tobago
- Champions: Barbados Pride (9th title)
- Runners-up: Trinidad and Tobago Red Force
- Participants: 6
- Matches: 14
- Most runs: Kyle Mayers (Barbados Pride) – 168
- Most wickets: Joshua Bishop (Barbados Pride) – 8 Terrance Hinds (Trinidad and Tobago Red Force) – 8

The 2025–26 Super50 Cup was the 51st edition of the Super50 Cup, the domestic limited-overs cricket competition for the main countries in the West Indies. The tournament began on the 19 November, and the final was played on the 29 November 2025 with all matches played in Trinidad and Tobago.

The tournament consisted of the six main teams: Barbados Pride, Guyana Harpy Eagles, Jamaica Scorpions, Leeward Islands Hurricanes, Trinidad & Tobago Red Force and Windward Islands Volcanoes. In the last season the finalists (Barbados Pride and Jamaica Scorpions) both forfeited the final when their captains were not present for a delayed toss, effectively refusing to play, and as a result, Cricket West Indies declared that no champions would be crowned as both sides forfeited the match by not being present for the delayed toss.

== Squads ==
The full squads for each team was announced on 18 November 2025.

| Barbados Pride Head Coach: Vasbert Drakes | Guyana Harpy Eagles Head Coach: Ryan Hercules | Jamaica Scorpions Head Coach: Robert Haynes | Leeward Islands Hurricanes Head Coach: Steve Liburd | Trinidad and Tobago Red Force Head Coach: Rayad Emrit | Windward Islands Volcanoes Head Coach: Keon Peters |
|---|---|---|---|---|---|
| Kyle Mayers (c); Joshua Bishop; Leniko Boucher; Kraigg Brathwaite; Dominic Drakes; Jonathan Drakes; Akeem Jordan; Matthew Jones; Javed Leacock; Zachary McCaskie; Demetrius Richards; Kemar Smith; Kevin Wickham; Nyeem Young | Matthew Nandu (c); Antony Adams; Ronaldo Alimohamed; Kevlon Anderson; Shamar Apple; Mavendra Dindyal; Thaddeus Lovell; Richie Looknauth; Gudakesh Motie; Keemo Paul; Raymond Perez; Kemol Savory; Junior Sinclair; Sylus Tyndall | Brad Barnes (c); Andre Bailey; Jermaine Blackwood; Carlos Brown; Khari Campbell; Javelle Glenn; Jordan Johnson; Abhijai Mansingh; Kirk McKenzie; Marquino Mindley; Romaine Morris; Tamarie Redwood; Jeavor Royal; Peat Salmon | Karima Gore (c); Jewel Andrew; Carlon Bowen-Tuckett; Rahkeem Cornwall; Daniel Doram; Nathan Edward; Chamiqueko Gumbs-Landefort; Jahmar Hamilton; Kofi James; Mikyle Louis; Micah Mckenzie; Ishmael Peters; Oshane Thomas; Tyrone Williams | Joshua Da Silva (c, wk); Navin Bidaisee; Yannic Cariah; Bryan Charles; Cephas Cooper; Jyd Goolie; Terrance Hinds; Ricky Jaipaul; Joshua James; Jason Mohammed; Kjorn Ottley; Shatrughan Rambaran; Abdul-Raheem Toppin; Tion Webster | Teddy Bishop (c); Sunil Ambris; McKenny Clarke; Darel Cyrus; Kenneth Dember; Shadrack Descarte; Dillon Douglas; Keon Gaston; Johann Jeremiah; Daniel McDonald; Kimani Melius; Kirtsen Murray; Darron Nedd; Stephan Pascal |

== Points table ==
| Pos | Team | Pld | W | L | T | NR | Pts | NRR | Qualification |
|---|---|---|---|---|---|---|---|---|---|
| 1 | Trinidad and Tobago Red Force | 5 | 3 | 0 | 0 | 2 | 16 | 0.959 | Advanced to the final |
| 2 | Barbados Pride | 5 | 2 | 0 | 0 | 3 | 14 | 3.061 | Advanced to the final |
| 3 | Windward Islands Volcanoes | 5 | 2 | 1 | 0 | 2 | 12 | −0.721 | |
| 4 | Guyana Harpy Eagles | 5 | 0 | 1 | 0 | 4 | 8 | −0.281 | |
| 5 | Jamaica Scorpions | 5 | 0 | 2 | 0 | 3 | 6 | −0.811 | |
| 6 | Leeward Islands Hurricanes | 5 | 0 | 3 | 0 | 2 | 4 | −1.636 | |

Source: ESPNCricinfo

== Final ==
Final
29 November 2025
14:00 (D/N)
Scorecard

| Trinidad and Tobago Red Force; 168 (42.3 overs) | v | Barbados Pride; 160/1 (29.3 overs) |
| Tion Webster 43 (67); Joshua Bishop 4/27 (10 overs) | | Kyle Mayers 89* (79); Terrance Hinds 1/44 (8 overs) |

Barbados Pride won by 9 wickets
Brian Lara Cricket Academy, San Fernando
Umpires: Deighton Butler and Christopher Taylor

- Barbados Pride won the toss and elected to field.
