= Vijay Bhosle =

Indian cricketer (born 1937)

Personal information
- Full name: Vijay Hanumantrao Bhosle
- Born: 1 October 1937 (age 89); Sangli, Bombay Presidency, British India
- Batting: Right-handed
- Bowling: Leg-break and googly

Domestic team information
- Years: Team
- 1955–56 to 1966–67: Maharashtra
- 1957–58 to 1958–59: Baroda
- 1967–68 to 1970–71: Bombay

Career statistics
Competition	First-class
Matches	110
Runs scored	5,729
Batting average	41.81
100s/50s	17/29
Top score	208
Balls bowled	3,132
Wickets	58
Bowling average	30.46
5 wickets in innings	2
10 wickets in match	0
Best bowling	7/77
Catches/stumpings	54/1
- Source: CricketArchive, 8 March 2021

Vijay Hanumantrao Bhosle (born 1 October 1937) is a former Indian cricketer who played first-class cricket in India from 1956 to 1971.

Bhosle was a middle-order batsman and occasional leg-spin bowler who came close to national selection for some years in the 1960s. He spent most of the first half of his career with Maharashtra and the second half with Bombay. He also represented West Zone from 1963–64 to 1968–69. The highest of his 17 centuries was 208 for Bombay against Rajasthan in the semi-final of the 1968–69 Ranji Trophy. His best bowling figures were 7 for 77 in the 1962–63 Moin-ud-Dowlah Gold Cup Tournament.
