= Vaseline incident =

The vaseline incident was one of the first publicised 'doctoring' (using unfair means to enhance the swing or seam abilities) of the cricket ball by a bowler, when it was alleged John Lever rubbed Vaseline onto one side of the ball so it would swing better.

== History ==
The incident occurred in the third test in Chennai (on 14-19 January 1977), with India 2-0 down in the series after heavy defeats in Delhi and Kolkata. Ball tampering regulations allow the application of sweat and saliva (naturally produced substances) to the cricket ball in an attempt to shine one side. Other means of altering the ball's condition, such as applying Vaseline, were banned.

Lever, and his bowling partner Bob Willis, both found themselves suffering from sweat falling into their eyes. It was suggested, naively, by the team physiotherapist that they apply strips of gauze covered with Vaseline above their eyes to divert sweat from their forehead away. In play these were found to slip, and Willis removed his. Eventually Lever also removed his and lay the gauze on the ground near the stumps where it was noticed by the umpires and Indian team, but not before he had used sweat from his forehead to shine the ball.

Bishen Singh Bedi, the under pressure captain of the Indian cricket team, was not convinced the Vaseline was to keep sweat out of the eyes. He said Lever had used unfair means to shine the ball. The English paceman’s habit of rubbing the ball over his eyebrows every now and then was also noticed. Tests on the cricket ball revealed presence of greasy substance. Whether the Vaseline had been intentionally applied to the ball or not was later disputed, and Lever's previous performances on the tour questioned.
