= George Rock (cricketer) =

Barbadian cricketer (1936–2022)

Personal information
- Full name: George Barton Rock
- Born: 24 May 1936; Bragg's Hill, Saint Joseph, Barbados
- Died: 11 February 2022 (aged 85); Warwick Parish, Bermuda
- Batting: Right-handed
- Bowling: Right-arm fast

Domestic team information
- Years: Team
- 1960-61 to 1968-69: Barbados

Career statistics
Competition	First-class
Matches	8
Runs scored	59
Batting average	6.55
100s/50s	0/0
Top score	19
Balls bowled	1628
Wickets	40
Bowling average	18.70
5 wickets in innings	3
10 wickets in match	0
Best bowling	6/18
Catches/stumpings	3/–
- Source: Cricinfo, 7 November 2019

George Barton Rock (24 May 1936 – 11 February 2022) was a Barbadian cricketer who played eight matches of first-class cricket for Barbados between 1961 and 1969. He later emigrated to Bermuda and coached the Bermuda national cricket team.

== Barbados ==
Rock was a fast bowler who played for Barbados at a time when the leading Barbadian fast bowlers were the West Indies Test opening pair Wesley Hall and Charlie Griffith. In his first match for Barbados, against Trinidad in 1960–61, he took 6 for 63 in the first innings. The next season he took 5 for 86 and 4 for 8 when Barbados beat Jamaica by an innings. After 1961–62 he did not play for Barbados again until 1968–69, when Hall and Griffith were touring Australia. That season he was one of the most successful bowlers in the Shell Shield, with 18 wickets at an average of 16.05, including 3 for 80 and 6 for 18 against Trinidad.

== United States ==
Rock studied radio announcing in New York City in 1965. He represented the US in the annual cricket match against Canada in 1964. He obtained a coaching certificate in England and returned to New York in 1969 to coach cricket.

== Bermuda ==
In the 1970s, Rock relocated to Bermuda where he played club cricket for Bailey's Bay in the Eastern Counties league. He coached national teams at both senior level and youth level.

Rock died in Bermuda on 11 February 2022, at the age of 85.
