= Philbert Blair =

West Indian cricketer

Personal information
- Full name: Philbert Duncan Blair
- Born: 30 October 1943 (age 83); Georgetown, British Guiana
- Batting: Right-handed
- Bowling: Right-arm fast

Domestic team information
- Years: Team
- 1967–68 to 1973–74: Guyana

Career statistics
| Competition | First-class | List A |
|---|---|---|
| Matches | 31 | 3 |
| Runs scored | 142 | 2 |
| Batting average | 5.91 | 1.00 |
| 100s/50s | 0/0 | 0/0 |
| Top score | 30 | 2 |
| Balls bowled | 4662 | 93 |
| Wickets | 77 | 1 |
| Bowling average | 34.15 | 85.00 |
| 5 wickets in innings | 3 | 0 |
| 10 wickets in match | 0 | – |
| Best bowling | 5/60 | 1/42 |
| Catches/stumpings | 5/– | 0/– |
- Source: Cricket Archive, 2 July 2014

Philbert Duncan Blair (born 30 October 1943) is a former Guyanese cricketer who played first-class cricket from 1968 to 1974. He toured with the West Indian cricket team in England in 1969 but did not play Test cricket.

A fast bowler, Philbert Blair made his first-class debut for Guyana in 1967–68. When the West Indies Test team were away touring Australia and New Zealand in 1968–69 he was the leading wicket-taker in the Shell Shield, with 23 wickets at an average of 21.26. He took 5 for 60 against Jamaica and 5 for 63 against Trinidad.

Blair was one of the four inexperienced pace bowlers chosen for the 1969 tour, alongside Vanburn Holder, John Shepherd and Grayson Shillingford, none of whom had played Test cricket. Blair played only nine of the 19 first-class matches on the tour, taking 14 wickets at 36.35, and the other three pace bowlers were preferred for the Tests. Colin Babb reports that some people considered Blair to be the most promising and quickest of the young pace attack, but says that Basil Butcher suggested that Blair was passed over for selection because of questions about his bowling action. In the one-day match against Ireland, West Indies were 12 for 9 before Blair joined Shillingford to raise the final total to 25.

Blair continued to play for Guyana with moderate success until the end of the 1973–74 season.
