= Alec Burns (cricketer) =

Trinidadian cricketer (born 1948)

Personal information
- Full name: Alec George Burns
- Born: 23 July 1948 (age 78); Trinidad
- Batting: Right-handed
- Bowling: Right-arm fast-medium
- Relatives: Marc Burns (son)

Domestic team information
- Years: Team
- 1970-71 to 1978-79: East Trinidad
- 1978-79 to 1980-81: Trinidad and Tobago

Career statistics
Competition	First-class	List A
Matches	21	8
Runs scored	429	60
Batting average	16.50	30.00
100s/50s	0/1	0/0
Top score	53	26
Balls bowled	2131	401
Wickets	38	17
Bowling average	24.36	13.94
5 wickets in innings	0	1
10 wickets in match	0	n/a
Best bowling	4/44	5/40
Catches/stumpings	11/–	2/–
- Source: Cricinfo, 13 July 2019

Alec George Burns (born 23 July 1948) is a former cricketer who played first-class and List A cricket for Trinidad and Tobago and East Trinidad from 1971 to 1981.

Burns was a fast-medium bowler and lower-order batsman. He helped Trinidad and Tobago win the final of the Geddes Grant/Harrison Line Trophy in 1978–79 and 1980–81. In 1978–79, he made 21 not out and took 5 for 40 and won the man of the match award. In 1980–81, he took 2 for 26 off 10 overs and was not required to bat in Trinidad and Tobago's four-wicket victory. He later served as chief selector for the Trinidad and Tobago team.

His son Marc Burns is an Olympic sprinter.
