= Chimwala Munilall =

Guyanese cricketer (1948–2017)

Personal information
- Born: 17 August 1948; Berbice, British Guiana
- Died: 12 April 2017 (aged 68); Florida, United States
- Source: Cricinfo, 3 May 2021

Chimwala Munilall (17 August 1948 – 12 April 2017) was a Guyanese cricketer. He played in one List A and thirteen first-class matches for Guyana from 1968 to 1978.

== See also ==
- List of Guyanese representative cricketers
