= Judah Reuben =

Indian cricket umpire (1922–2006)

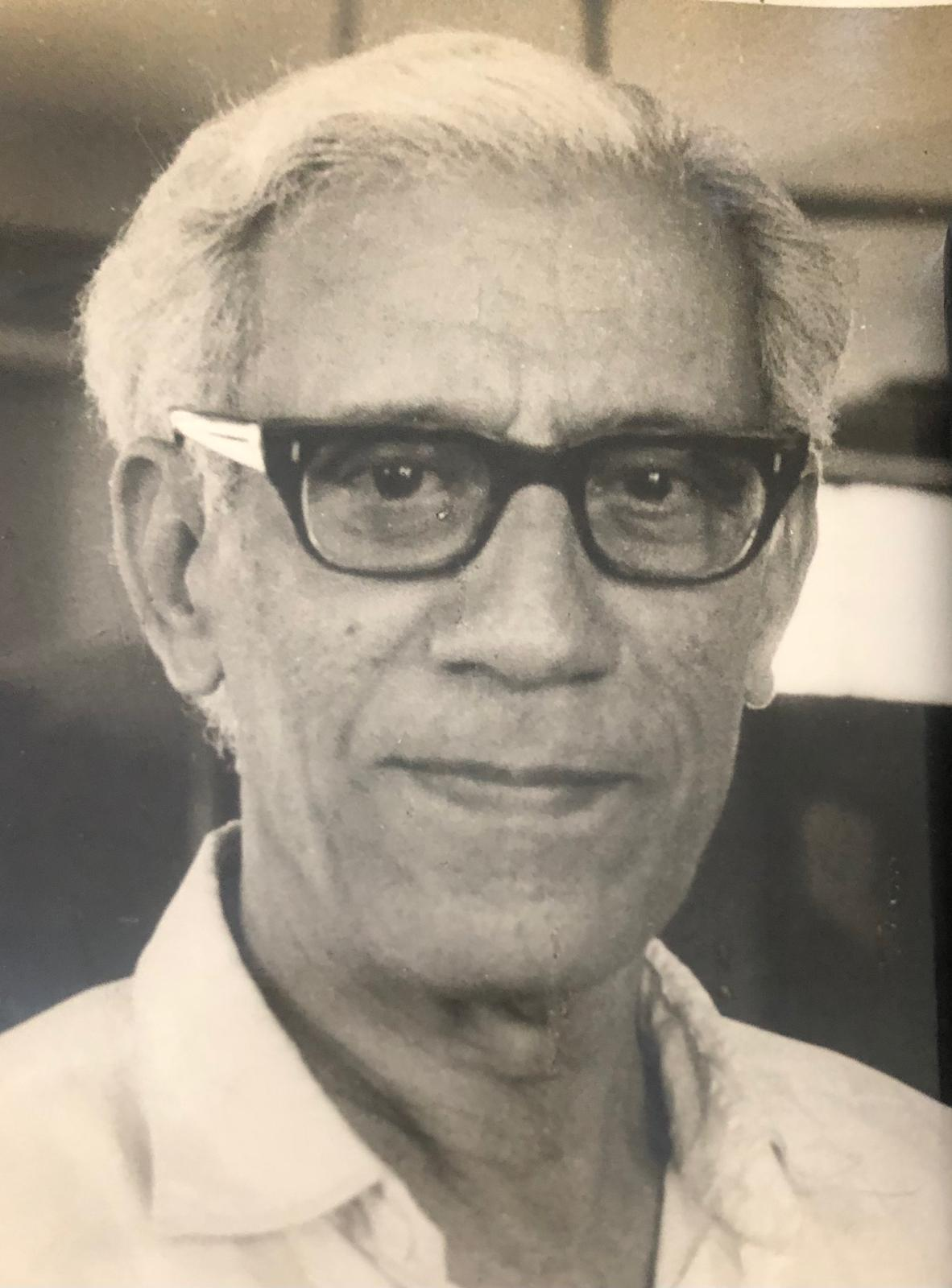

Personal information
- Born: 21 January 1922; Bombay, India
- Died: 13 November 2006 (aged 84); Mumbai, India
- Role: Umpire

Umpiring information
- Tests umpired: 10 (1969–1977)
- FC umpired: 54 (1960–1977)
- Source: CricketArchive, 27 June 2012

Judah Reuben (21 January 1922 – 13 November 2006) was an Indian cricket umpire.

Reuben began umpiring first-class cricket in 1960, and made his Test debut in 1969. He umpired ten Test matches between 1969 and 1977. He was best known for his involvement as a lead investigator in Vaseline incident.

Reuben worked as a fingerprint expert with the Bombay police in the Criminal Investigation Department, from 1947 to 1980. He died after a fall at home in 2006.

== Matches Umpired ==
Reuben's personal record lists the following matches which he umpired:

Statement Showing the Number of First-Class and Important Matches Umpired
| Item No. | Match/Test Type | Matches Umpired |
|---|---|---|
| 1. | Ranji Trophy Matches | 43 |
| 2. | Duleep Trophy Matches | 4 |
| 3. | Irani Trophy Matches | 2 |
| 4 (i). | Test - Unofficial | 2 |
| 4 (ii). | Test - Official | 10 |
| 5. | Foreign Side Matches | 7 |
| 6. | School Test | 3 |
| 7. | Defense Fund, Defense Savings and Small Savings Matches | 6 |
| 8. | Memorial and Benefit Matches | 6 |
| 9. | Cooch Behar (All India Schools Finals) Matches | 1 |
| 10. | Vizzy Trophy (All India Universities Finals) Matches | 1 |
| 11. | Inter-railway Matches | 5 |
| 12. | State Bank of India Inter-Circle Matches | 3 |
| 13. | All India Inter-Civil Services Cricket Tournament Matches - Finals | 2 |
| 14. | Ranji Centenary Celebrations Festival Cricket Match and Single Wicket Tournament | 2 |
| 15. | Gujarat Governor's XI vs Maharashtra Governor's XI Match | 1 |
| 16. | One-day International Match Bush XI vs West Indies (Wadekar Benefit Match) | 1 |
| 17. | One-day trial Match - In preparation of Indian Team's participation in the World Cup Tournament | 1 |

== Awards and recognition ==
Judah Reuben was the recipient of the government of Maharashtra's Shiv Chhatrapati Award in 1978 for services rendered to sports.

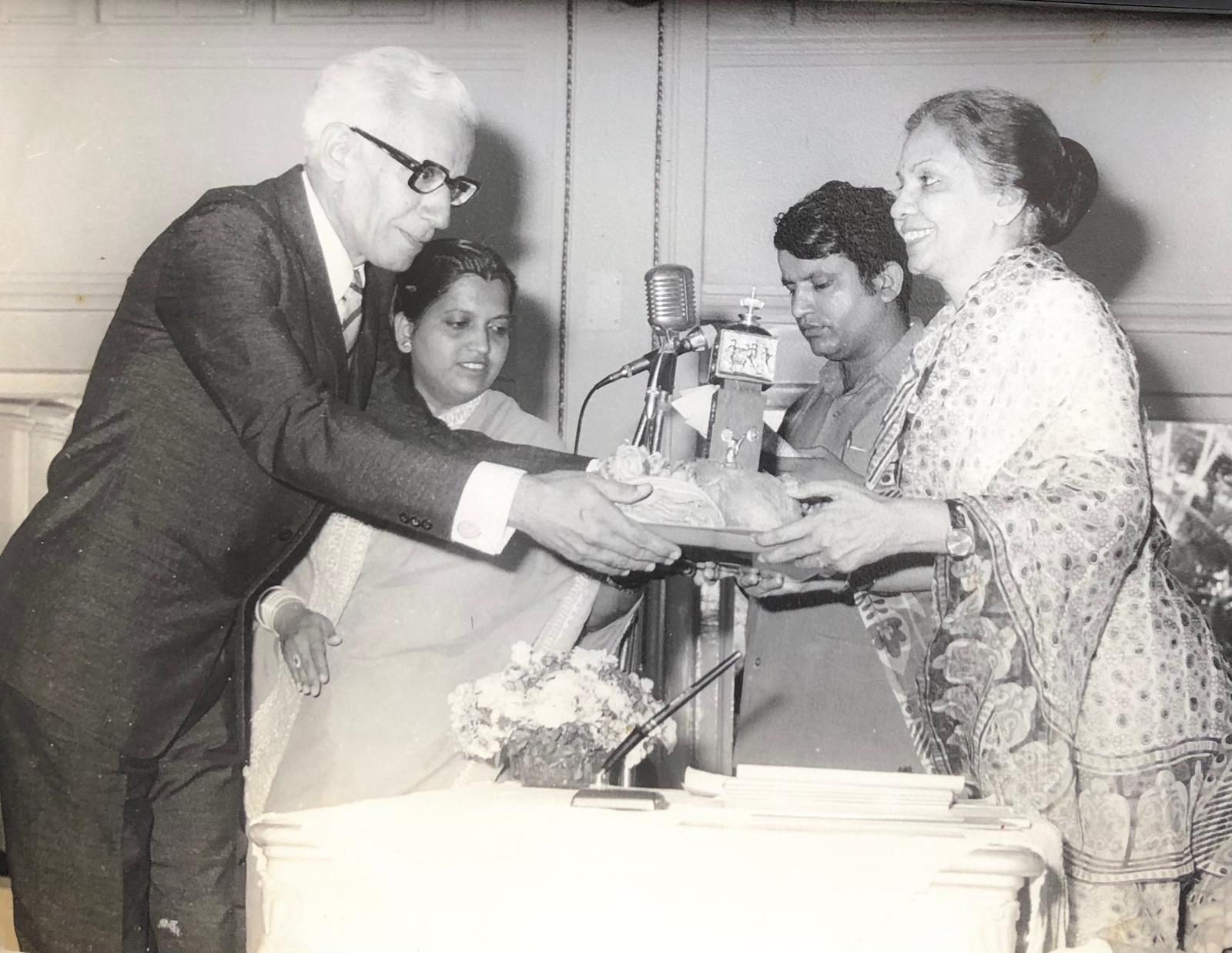
