= M. G. Vijayasarathi =

Indian cricket umpire (1906–1979)

Mysore Vijayasarathi
Personal information
- Full name: Mysore Gururao Vijayasarathi
- Born: 11 December 1906; Bangalore, India
- Died: 30 June 1979 (aged 72); Bangalore, India
- Role: Umpire

Umpiring information
- Tests umpired: 13 (1951–1960)
- Source: ESPNcricinfo, 16 July 2013

Mysore Gururao Vijayasarathi (11 December 1906 – 30 June 1979) was an Indian cricket umpire. He stood in 13 Test matches between 1951 and 1960. Vijayasarathi earlier played in eight first-class matches for Mysore.

His son, M. V. Nagendra, also umpired at Test level. The pair stood together in a first-class match between Mysore and Andhra during the 1960–61 season. Another son, M.V. Ravindra, played two Ranji Trophy matches for Madhya Pradesh

== See also ==
- List of Test cricket umpires
