= Har Sharma =

Indian cricket umpire (1922–1992)

Personal information
- Full name: Har Prasad Sharma
- Born: 8 December 1922; Delhi, India
- Died: 12 November 1992 (aged 69); Delhi, India

Umpiring information
- Tests umpired: 3 (1974–1977)
- Source: ESPNcricinfo, 16 July 2013

Har Sharma (8 December 1922 – 12 November 1992) was an Indian cricket umpire. He stood in three Test matches between 1974 and 1977.

== See also ==
- List of Test cricket umpires
