= Desmond Lewis =

West Indian cricketer (1946–2018)

Personal information
- Full name: Desmond Michael Lewis
- Born: 21 February 1946; Jamaica
- Died: 25 March 2018 (aged 72); Atlanta, Georgia, U.S.
- Batting: Right-handed
- Role: Wicketkeeper-batsman

International information
- National side: West Indies
- Test debut (cap 138): 19 March 1971 v India
- Last Test: 13 April 1971 v India

Domestic team information
- Years: Team
- 1970–1975/76: Jamaica

Career statistics
Competition	Test	FC	LA
Matches	3	36	2
Runs scored	259	1,623	81
Batting average	86.33	31.82	40.50
100s/50s	0/3	0/12	0/1
Top score	88	96	53
Catches/stumpings	8/0	67/11	4/1
- Source: Cricinfo, 22 May 2023

Desmond Michael Lewis (21 February 1946 – 25 March 2018) was a West Indian cricketer who played in three Test matches in 1971.

Lewis began his first-class career on the brief Jamaican tour of England in 1970. A few months later he scored 96 and 67 not out for Jamaica in the first match of India's tour of the West Indies in 1970–71. He replaced Mike Findlay as the West Indies' wicket-keeper after the Second Test. On his Test debut, batting at number seven, Lewis scored 81 not out, putting on 84 for the ninth wicket with Lance Gibbs. He opened the batting in the last two Tests, scoring 88 (putting on 166 for the second wicket with Rohan Kanhai), 14, 72, and then 4 not out, going in at number nine. Wisden referred to him as "an obdurate customer". In 1970-71 he scored 652 runs at 65.20 with seven fifties.

Findlay returned to the Test team when New Zealand toured in 1971–72, and Lewis played no more Tests. He continued to play for Jamaica until 1975–76.

He and his wife moved to the United States in 1979. They had three sons. Lewis died in Atlanta on 25 March 2018, due to lung cancer.
