= Geoff Greenidge =

West Indian cricketer (born 1948)

Personal information
- Full name: Geoffrey Alan Greenidge
- Born: 26 May 1948 (age 78); Fontabelle, St Michael, Barbados
- Batting: Right-handed
- Bowling: Leg spin
- Role: Batsman

International information
- National side: West Indies
- Test debut (cap 142): 6 April 1972 v New Zealand
- Last Test: 6 April 1973 v Australia

Domestic team information
- Years: Team
- 1967–1976: Barbados
- 1968–1975: Sussex

Career statistics
| Competition | Test | FC | LA |
|---|---|---|---|
| Matches | 5 | 182 | 107 |
| Runs scored | 209 | 9,112 | 1,879 |
| Batting average | 29.85 | 29.39 | 20.20 |
| 100s/50s | 0/1 | 16/45 | 0/11 |
| Top score | 50 | 205 | 82 |
| Balls bowled | 156 | 1,355 | 6 |
| Wickets | 0 | 13 | 1 |
| Bowling average | – | 72.92 | 6.00 |
| 5 wickets in innings | – | 1 | 0 |
| 10 wickets in match | – | 0 | 0 |
| Best bowling | – | 7/124 | 1/6 |
| Catches/stumpings | 3/– | 95/– | 32/– |
- Source: CricketArchive, 31 January 2009

Geoffrey Alan Greenidge (born 26 May 1948) is a former West Indian cricketer who played in five Test matches from 1972 to 1973. His international career ended abruptly when he took part in a tour of Rhodesia, which was then under white minority rule. On his first-class debut in 1966–67, he scored 205 runs and took seven wickets in the first innings of the match.

Greenidge was the last white player to play for West Indies, until Joshua Da Silva made his debut in 2020. For a time, it was believed that Brendan Nash had taken this distinction in 2008, but Nash was later revealed to be of mixed race.
