= Len Baichan =

West Indian cricketer

Personal information
- Full name: Leonard Baichan
- Born: 12 May 1946; Rose Hall, Berbice, British Guiana
- Batting: Left-handed
- Bowling: Right-arm medium

International information
- National side: West Indies
- Test debut (cap 152): 15 February 1975 v Pakistan
- Last Test: 31 January 1976 v Australia

Domestic team information
- Years: Team
- 1968/69–1982/83: Guyana

Career statistics
Competition	Test	First-class	LA
Matches	3	63	8
Runs scored	184	4,504	268
Batting average	46.00	51.18	38.28
100s/50s	1/0	13/23	0/3
Top score	105*	216*	74
Catches/stumpings	2/0	35/0	2/0
- Source: Cricinfo, 10 September 2022

Leonard Baichan (born 12 May 1946) is a Guyanese former international cricketer who played as a batsman. Baichan featured in three Test matches from 1975 to 1976 for West Indies, scoring a century on his debut. He also scored over 4,000 runs at an average of 51.18 with 13 centuries and 23 half centuries in his first class career.

== Career ==
Leonard Baichan was born Ganesh Baichan Dhanraj in Rose Hall Village in Berbice, Guyana (then British Guiana) around the same area where Rohan Kanhai, Alvin Kallicharran, Basil Butcher and Joe Solomon were brought up. He grew up in No.2 Village, East Canje.

=== Local cricket ===
Baichan had a bad start in grade cricket making no runs against Port Mourant and Blairmont in his first two matches. Thereafter he scored consistently and in 1967 won the man of the match in the first inter-club limited overs tournament. He was called for the trials against the M.C.C. in 1967-68. It was only after this that he made his first class cricket debut for Guyana in 1968 and Berbice in 1969.

Guyana had a batting line up of Roy Fredericks, Steve Camacho, Kanhai, Clive Lloyd and Kallicharran, and Baichan found it difficult to break into it. After Lloyd and Kanhai went away to play for Rest of the World in Australia in 1971-72, he began to get more chances. He developed a defensive batting style and attitude that complemented the aggressive batting of the others. Typical was his innings of 96 in 444 minutes for the West Indies Board President's XI against the New Zealanders in 1971–72. Facing a score of 486, Baichan started the third day of 6*. At lunch, he was 28* in 152 minutes, his batting "becoming tedious" and had "not a stroke to remember" according to D. J. Cameron. He progressed to 80* in 330 minutes at close of play. On the fourth day he was, according to Cameron, "an utter bore," and "he ground on" until yorked by Bev Congdon.

Baichan scored 216* and 102 v Demerara in 1973-74 and played an even more significant innings against the touring M.C.C. in the following January. MCC made 511 for 4 on the back of a career best 261* by Geoff Boycott. President's XI made 164, Baichan top score of 49, and were set an impossible target in the second innings. Baichan batted eight hours to score 139* and avoided a defeat, including 84 runs in the last wicket partnership with Andy Roberts. Henry Blofeld thought that Baichan was, for a West Indies batsman, "unusually reluctant to hit the ball". Baichan was one of the four new caps selected for the following trip to India and Pakistan along with Gordon Greenidge, Vivian Richards and Albert Padmore.

=== Test career ===
Baichan started the tour of India scoring 158 against the Universities and 114* against South Zone. Three days before the first Test in Bangalore, he suffered a minor injury in a car accident. Gordon Greenidge who made his debut scored 93 and 107 and opened the batting with Roy Fredericks in all Tests of the series. Baichan's injury was slight enough that he opened with Greenidge against Board President's XI three days after the end of the Test. But his form tailed off in the side matches and he was not selected in any of the five Tests in India.

The tour moved to Sri Lanka and Pakistan. Baichan scored a match-winning 72* in a 55 over one-day match in Colombo. Greenidge being out with a back injury, he made his Test debut against Pakistan at Lahore. Baichan scored 20 runs in an opening partnership of 66 with Fredericks. West Indies was set 359 to win in a day and 15 minutes in the second innings. Baichan scored 105* in 373 minutes becoming the eighth West Indian batsman to score a century on debut. He had a partnership of 164 with Clive Lloyd during which he frequently faced three or four bouncers an over from Sarfraz Nawaz. When Baichan reached his hundred with a two to midwicket, the field was invaded by around 50 spectators. The police chased them off with their long batons, "providing the best entertainment of the day". He scored 36 in the second Test at Karachi, this time adding 95 with Fredericks.

Picked for the tour of Australia next winter, some critics considered him a poor player of true fast bowling. But Baichan scored consistently in matches against the domestic sides. Greenidge who opened in the first Test scored 0 & 0 and was dropped. Baichan could well have replaced him after scoring 72 in the first innings against South Australia on the eve of the third Test at Melbourne but in the second innings, he was hit on the elbow by Geoff Attenborough. It put him out of cricket for a few days. Greenidge did not play again after scoring 3 and 8 in the Test. West Indies tried Bernard Julien, Alvin Kallicharran and Vivian Richards to open with Fredericks. When Baichan was finally brought back for the sixth Test, it was to bat at the No.3 position. He scored 23 runs as West Indies lost the Test and the series 1–5.

=== Later life ===
This was the end of Baichan's Test career. Greenidge had a very successful tour of England in 1976, and when Fredericks exited cricket, Desmond Haynes became the second opener. Baichan played for Berbice till 1982–83. In his last first class match, he scored 132 & 101* against Demerara. He played for Cumberland in Minor Counties Championship in England till 1983. He settled down in United States and made yearly visits to Berbice for coaching young cricketers. In 2012, he was inducted into the Berbice Cricket Hall of Fame.
