= Inshan Ali =

Trinidadian cricketer

Cricket information
- Batting: Left-handed
- Bowling: Slow left-arm wrist-spin

International information
- National side: West Indies
- Test debut (cap 139): 1 April 1971 v India
- Last Test: 1 April 1977 v Pakistan

Domestic team information
- Years: Team
- 1965–1980: Trinidad and Tobago

Career statistics
Competition	Test	First-class
Matches	12	90
Runs scored	172	1,341
Batting average	10.75	13.82
100s/50s	0/0	0/3
Top score	25	63
Balls bowled	3,718	19,253
Wickets	34	328
Bowling average	47.67	28.93
5 wickets in innings	1	17
10 wickets in match	0	4
Best bowling	5/59	8/58
Catches/stumpings	7/–	43/–
- Source: CricInfo, 13 August 2020

Inshan Ali (25 September 1949 – 24 June 1995) was a Trinidadian cricketer who played in 12 Test matches from 1971 to 1977 for West Indian cricket team.

== Biography ==
Born in Preysal, Trinidad and Tobago, of Indian descent, Ali was the second of eight children to Asgar, a manual labourer, and Naimoon Ali. Ali was a left-arm unorthodox spin bowler who made his first-class cricket debut for South Trinidad against North Trinidad on 15 April 1966, aged just 16 years and 202 days. He took three wickets for 89 runs.

In his second match, for Trinidad and Tobago against Windward Islands, Ali took 5/32, and, following further good performances, was selected in the West Indies Board President's team to play the touring Marylebone Cricket Club (MCC) team.

Ali continued to perform well, if unpredictably, at domestic level and was often a trump card for Trinidad at the spin friendly Port-of-Spain, leading to him becoming the first person from central Trinidad to play Test cricket for the West Indies when he made his Test debut on 1 April 1971 against India at Kensington Oval, Bridgetown, Barbados, taking 0/60 and 1/65.

During the 1971/72 home series against New Zealand, Inshan was referred to as "astonishingly skilled and mature" for a player in his early twenties", who "is a small, slim man with short fingers; after a brisk little run his left arm flipped through quickly."

Ali had his best bowling performance in this series, taking 5/59 against New Zealand at Port-of-Spain, with the batsmen finding it very difficult to pick his wrist-spin and wrong 'un, leading one onlooker to write "properly handled, (Ali) could be a match-winner against the Australians when they tour the Caribbean next summer."

As it turned out, Ali had a solid rather than spectacular series against Australia, taking ten wickets at 47.30 and made spasmodic national appearances afterwards, including one Test each in England and Australia, before his final Test, against Pakistan at Port-of-Spain in April 1977, where he had match figures of 5/159.

Ali's continuing success in domestic cricket (he took a record 27 wickets during the 1973–74 Shell Shield season) and a reputation as a mystery spinner however ensured that the West Indies hierarchy retained confidence in him when his results were poor. Prior to the 1975/76 tour of Australia, West Indies captain Clive Lloyd claimed that Ali would be a key to a West Indies series victory, stating "I think Inshan now believes in himself... He's on top of the world and he feels there is no batsman he shouldn't get out."

Former Test cricketer Frank Tyson also thought highly of Ali, stating that he "disguised his chinamen and his wrong 'uns with consummate artistry, spinning the ball quite prodigiously", although Tyson believed Ali's inability to counter batsmen who advanced down the pitch to him was his downfall.

Ali had a number of shortcomings as a Test cricketer, including his poor batting and his "annoying habit of running across the line of the stumps (while bowling), especially when he senses a caught-and-bowled chance." Opposition batsman complained and one umpire said he could not rule on an lbw decision because Ali had run across the umpire's line of sight.

Ali was also a poor fielder, described as "nervous" by one onlooker. Clive Lloyd was visibly displeased during the Second Test of the 1975/76 West Indies tour of Australia when Ali took the field as a substitute fielder, and even more so when he dropped a simple catch.

He was described as looking "increasingly out of place in the team as the emphasis switched to non-stop fast bowling, and his inability to translate his first-class form to Test level was one of the factors that encouraged West Indies to transform their game." It has been argued that Ali, like other West Indian spinners from the 1970s onwards, was treated poorly by West Indian selectors and captains too impatient to let spinners mature, and captains unable to set fields for spinners.

Ali retired from first-class cricket at the completion of the 1979/80 West Indies season.

== Personal life ==
Ali's younger brother Imkhan died of cancer on 26 December 1969 aged 18.

Ali returned to playing club cricket in Trinidad shortly before developing throat cancer, of which he died, in Port of Spain, on 24 June 1995, aged 45.

Inshan Ali Oval in Preysal is named for him. In 2014 a biography, Pride of Preysal: The Inshan Ali Story, written by Ali's sister Shafeeza Ali-Motilal, was published.
