= Charlie Davis (cricketer) =

West Indian cricketer (1944–2026)

Personal information
- Full name: Charles Allan Davis
- Born: 1 January 1944; Belmont, Port-of-Spain, Trinidad and Tobago
- Died: 25 June 2026 (aged 82)
- Batting: Right-handed
- Bowling: Right-arm medium

International information
- National side: West Indies
- Test debut: 26 December 1968 v Australia
- Last Test: 21 April 1973 v Australia

Career statistics
Competition	Test	FC	LA
Matches	15	90	2
Runs scored	1,301	5,538	12
Batting average	54.20	41.32	12.00
100s/50s	4/4	14/28	0/0
Top score	183	183	12
Balls bowled	894	5,783	30
Wickets	2	63	2
Bowling average	165.00	39.36	27.00
5 wickets in innings	0	3	0
10 wickets in match	0	0	0
Best bowling	1/27	7/106	2/54
Catches/stumpings	4/–	44/–	1/–
- Source: CricInfo, 26 May 2019

Charles Allan Davis (1 January 1944 – 25 June 2026) was a West Indian cricketer who played in fifteen Test matches between 1968 and 1973. Davis started his first-class cricket career at the age of 17, playing for Trinidad and Tobago. After a good Shell Shield season in 1968 Davis was selected for the West Indies. The highlight of his career was a home series against India, in which he scored 529 runs in four Tests at the average of 132.25. He was also a useful bowler, taking 63 wickets at first-class level. His Test career ended while the West Indies were in transition, and the arrival of newer players accounted for any place for Davis in the side.

== Career ==
Born on 1 January 1944, in Belmont, Port of Spain, Trinidad and Tobago, Davis was part of the West Indies squad that toured Australia between November 1968 and February 1969. The West Indies had dominated Test cricket for most of the decade, but at this stage the team contained many ageing stars and encountered an Australian team on the rise. Davis was one of the younger players in the touring party, and made his Test debut at the age of 24. Australia won the five-match series 3–1. After they lost the first Test, the West Indies made three changes to their team by bringing in three debutants: Davis, Roy Fredericks, and Prof Edwards. Davis batted down the order (after the sixth wicket in the first innings, and one place lower in the second, coming in after the fall of the seventh wicket) and made scores of 18 and 10. By inflicting an innings defeat on the West Indies, Australia batted just once in the match. Davis bowled 24 overs, conceding 94 runs while taking the wicket of opening batsman Bill Lawry. It was the only Test Davis played on the tour.

Davis' next taste of Test cricket was during the West Indies tour of England in 1969. In the meantime the West Indies had drawn a series with New Zealand and the team had undergone significant changes in personnel. Only five of the sixteen touring West Indians had played in England before. On his return to the team in the opening Test, Davis batted much higher than he had on debut and in both innings came in after the fall of the second wicket, scoring 34 and 24. Davis registered his maiden Test century in the second Test and was the only one scored by a West Indian during the tour.

== Death ==
Davis died on 25 June 2026, at the age of 82.
