= Robin Bynoe =

West Indian cricketer (born 1941)

Personal information
- Full name: Michael Robin Bynoe
- Born: February 23, 1941 (age 85); Black Rock, Saint Michael, Barbados
- Batting: Right-handed
- Bowling: Left-arm medium
- Relatives: Henry Austin (grandfather)

International information
- National side: West Indies

Career statistics
Competition	Tests	First-class
Matches	4	56
Runs scored	111	3572
Batting average	18.50	41.05
100s/50s	0/0	6/20
Top score	48	190
Balls bowled	30	486
Wickets	1	9
Bowling average	5.00	27.33
5 wickets in innings	0	0
10 wickets in match	0	0
Best bowling	1/5	2/7
Catches/stumpings	4/–	45/–
- Source: Cricinfo, 15 October 2021

Michael Robin Bynoe (born February 23, 1941, in Black Rock, Saint Michael, Barbados) is a former West Indian cricketer who played in four Tests between 1959 and 1967.

== Career ==
Bynoe had played only two first-class matches when he was picked for the West Indies' tour of India and Pakistan in 1958–59. He had limited success on the tour, with a highest score in the first-class matches of only 76, but was picked for the final Test match, aged 18, when he opened the innings with Gerry Alexander. He was out for one run and took one catch.

In the limited first-class cricket in the West Indies in the late 1950s and early 1960s, Bynoe's appearances were only sporadic and it was 1963–64 when he made his first first-class century, 120 for Barbados against Jamaica.

Centuries in the next two West Indian seasons led to a second call up for a tour to India, this time the 1966–67 tour. Again, Bynoe had limited success in the first-class games, but this time he played in all three Tests as the opening partner to Conrad Hunte. Only in the third match, at Chepauk, Madras (now Chennai), did he make any impact, scoring 48 and 36 and taking his only Test wicket.

Thereafter Bynoe's first-class cricket was confined to Barbados, for whom he played until the 1971–72 Shell Shield season, where he made his highest first-class score of 190 against Trinidad and Tobago. He toured England with the Barbados team in 1969, but had not been picked for the West Indies team that was in England earlier that season.
