= M. V. Nagendra =

Indian cricket umpire (1933–1978)

Personal information
- Born: 22 March 1933
- Died: 27 November 1978 (aged 45); Bangalore, India
- Role: Umpire

Umpiring information
- Tests umpired: 11 (1964–1977)
- Source: ESPNcricinfo, 13 July 2013

Mysore Vijayasarathi Nagendra (22 March 1933 – 27 November 1978) was an Indian cricket umpire. He stood in eleven Test matches between 1964 and 1977.

M.V. Nagendra's father, M. G. Vijayasarathi, also umpired in Tests. The pair stood together in a first-class match between Mysore and Andhra during the 1960–61 season.

On the day of his death, as the Karnataka state coach, Nagendra attended a training session in the morning before falling ill and dying from a heart attack. He had been appointed to stand in the Test between India and West Indies at Calcutta on 29 December 1978.

== See also ==
- List of Test cricket umpires
