= Jack Noreiga =

West Indian cricketer

Cricket information
- Batting: Right-handed
- Bowling: Right-arm offbreak

International information
- National side: West Indies
- Test debut (cap 136): 18 February 1971 v India
- Last Test: 13 April 1971 v India

Domestic team information
- Years: Team
- 1961–1975: Trinidad and Tobago

Career statistics
Competition	Test	First-class
Matches	4	21
Runs scored	11	181
Batting average	3.66	9.05
100s/50s	0/0	0/0
Top score	9	25
Balls bowled	1,322	5,288
Wickets	17	68
Bowling average	29.00	29.67
5 wickets in innings	2	4
10 wickets in match	0	1
Best bowling	9/95	9/95
Catches/stumpings	2/–	4/–
- Source: CricInfo, 14 January 2020

Jack Mollinson Noreiga (15 April 1936 – 8 August 2003) was a West Indian cricketer who played in four Test matches in 1971.

An off-spinner, Noreiga took 9 for 95 in India's first innings in the Second Test in Port of Spain in 1970–71. He remains the only West Indian to take nine wickets in a Test innings.
