= Joey Carew =

Trinidadian cricketer

- Joey Carew in 1966

Personal information
- Full name: Michael Conrad Carew
- Born: 15 September 1937; Port of Spain, Trinidad and Tobago
- Died: 8 January 2011 (aged 73); Port of Spain, Trinidad and Tobago
- Batting: Left-handed
- Bowling: Right-arm off-break Right-arm medium pace

International information
- National side: West Indies
- Test debut: 6 June 1963 v England
- Last Test: 23 March 1972 v New Zealand

Domestic team information
- Years: Team
- 1955–1973: Trinidad and Tobago

Career statistics
Competition	Tests	FC	LA
Matches	19	129	2
Runs scored	1,127	7,810	113
Batting average	34.15	38.47	56.50
100s/50s	1/5	13/43	0/1
Top score	109	182	78
Balls bowled	1,174	8,135	66
Wickets	8	108	2
Bowling average	54.62	29.75	36.00
5 wickets in innings	0	5	0
10 wickets in match	0	0	0
Best bowling	1/11	5/28	2/60
Catches/stumpings	13/–	83/–	0/–
- Source: CricketArchive, 10 January 2010

Michael Conrad "Joey" Carew (15 September 1937 – 8 January 2011) was a West Indian cricketer who played in 19 Tests from 1963 to 1972.

An opening batsman and off-spin bowler, Carew's sole Test century came against New Zealand at Eden Park in 1969. The previous year he put on 119 for the first wicket with Steve Camacho against England at Queen's Park Oval. In the victory over Australia in Brisbane in December 1968, he made 83 and 71 not out.

Carew captained Trinidad and Tobago and was the first man to take the side to consecutive Shell Shield titles. Carew went on to serve as a selector for West Indies cricket for 20 years, in three separate stints, retiring from the post in 2006.

He was known to be a mentor to Brian Lara, whom he took in as a young teen. Christopher Martin-Jenkins once wrote of Carew: "Perhaps his greatest legacy to West Indies cricket, however, lies in the advice and encouragement he gave to a young left-hander from Santa Cruz in Trinidad. Brian Lara rewarded Joey Carew richly for the interest he showed in him."

Carew lived throughout his life in the Woodbrook district of Port of Spain, not far from the house in which he was born and raised. He attended Fatima College. In addition to his passion for cricket, he was a fan of horse-racing. His two sons are Michael Carew, a trainer for Trinidadian horse-racing, and David Carew, a banker. Carew died in January 2011 from arteriosclerosis, aged 73.
