= Uton Dowe =

Jamaican cricketer (born 1949)

Personal information
- Full name: Uton George Dowe
- Born: 29 March 1949 (age 77); Saint Mary Parish, Jamaica
- Batting: Right-handed
- Bowling: Right-arm fast
- Role: Bowler

International information
- National side: West Indies (1971–1973)
- Test debut (cap 140): 1 April 1971 v India
- Last Test: 16 February 1973 v Australia

Domestic team information
- Years: Team
- 1969/70–1976/77: Jamaica

Career statistics
Competition	Test	FC	LA
Matches	4	27	3
Runs scored	8	128	11
Batting average	8.00	7.11	–
100s/50s	0/0	0/0	0/0
Top score	5*	25*	6*
Balls bowled	1014	5,167	165
Wickets	12	97	4
Bowling average	44.50	27.86	32.00
5 wickets in innings	0	3	0
10 wickets in match	0	0	0
Best bowling	4/69	7/19	2/39
Catches/stumpings	3/–	9/–	0/–
- Source: ESPNcricinfo, 18 February 2019

Uton George Dowe (born 29 March 1949) is a former Jamaican cricketer. He played four Test matches for the West Indies as a fast bowler from 1971 to 1973.

He played for Jamaica from the 1969–70 season to the 1976–77 season. He was the leading wicket-taker in the 1970–71 Shell Shield season, with 24 wickets at 15.75, including 2 for 34 and 7 for 19 in the match against Combined Leeward and Windward Islands, a performance that was immediately rewarded with his Test debut in the Fourth Test against India, in which he took 4 for 69 and 1 for 22.

Despite his short Test career, Dowe is famous for the so-called 11th commandment, 'Dowe shalt not bowl', dished out to him by spectators in his final Test match against Australia in 1972–73 in response to his erratic bowling to Keith Stackpole.
