= Arthur Barrett (cricketer) =

West Indian cricketer (1944–2018)

Cricket information
- Batting: Right-handed
- Bowling: Legbreak googly

International information
- National side: West Indies
- Test debut: 18 February 1971 v India
- Last Test: 23 January 1975 v India

Career statistics
Competition	Test	First-class
Matches	6	57
Runs scored	40	1,086
Batting average	6.66	17.51
100s/50s	0/0	1/0
Top score	19	102*
Balls bowled	1,612	11,740
Wickets	13	169
Bowling average	46.38	31.21
5 wickets in innings	0	9
10 wickets in match	0	2
Best bowling	3/43	7/90
Catches/stumpings	0/–	54/–
- Source: CricInfo, 31 October 2022

Arthur George Barrett (4 April 1944 – 6 March 2018) was a West Indian international cricketer who played in six Test matches from 1971 to 1975.

A leg-spinner, Barrett played for Jamaica from 1966–67 to 1975–76, and then returned for another season in 1980–81. He toured England with Jamaica in 1970, and India, Pakistan and Sri Lanka with the West Indies in 1974–75.

Although he was a useful lower-order batsman, he reached 50 only once in first-class cricket, when he went on to 102 not out (and then took 5 for 39 and 5 for 43) against Combined Leeward and Windward Islands in 1969–70. A few weeks earlier he had taken his best first-class innings figures, 7 for 90 against the International Cavaliers. His best match figures came in 1973–74, again at the expense of Combined Leeward and Windward Islands, when he took 5 for 23 and 6 for 87, dismissing Viv Richards twice.
