= Vanburn Holder =

West Indian cricketer (born 1945)

Personal information
- Full name: Vanburn Alonzo Holder
- Born: 10 October 1945 (age 81); Deans Village, Saint Michael, Barbados
- Batting: Right-handed
- Bowling: Right-arm fast-medium

International information
- National side: West Indies
- Test debut (cap 131): 12 June 1969 v England
- Last Test: 2 February 1979 v India
- ODI debut (cap 5): 5 September 1973 v England
- Last ODI: 12 April 1978 v Australia

Domestic team information
- Years: Team
- 1966–1978: Barbados
- 1968–1980: Worcestershire
- 1985/86: Orange Free State

Umpiring information
- WTests umpired: 1 (2002)
- WODIs umpired: 2 (1999)

Career statistics
Competition	Test	ODI	FC	LA
Matches	40	12	313	196
Runs scored	682	64	3,593	587
Batting average	14.20	12.80	12.97	7.93
100s/50s	0/0	0/0	1/4	0/0
Top score	42	30	122	35*
Balls bowled	9,095	681	55,593	9,342
Wickets	109	19	950	277
Bowling average	33.27	23.89	24.52	18.94
5 wickets in innings	3	1	38	3
10 wickets in match	0	0	3	0
Best bowling	6/28	5/50	7/40	6/33
Catches/stumpings	16/–	6/–	99/–	46/–
Medal record
Men's Cricket
Representing West Indies
ICC Cricket World Cup
Winner	1975 England
- Source: CricketArchive, 17 October 2010

Vanburn Alonzo Holder (born 10 October 1945) is a Barbadian former first-class cricketer who played in 40 Test matches and 12 One Day Internationals for the West Indies cricket team between 1969 and 1979. A fast-medium bowler, he bowled alongside the likes of Charlie Griffith and Wes Hall. Holder, who also played for English county cricket side Worcestershire, was appointed an honorary vice president of the club in 2021. He was a member of the squad which won the 1975 Cricket World Cup.

== Playing career ==
He debuted in the tour of England in 1969 and returned again in 1973 as part of an improving side which ended a 6½-year streak of not having won a Test series.

In 1974 he was part of Worcestershire's Championship winning side and earlier in the year he scored his only first-class century, 122 for Barbados.

He took 6 for 39 in 1974–75 against India to help his side win the series. Eventually however he lost his place in the side as younger and faster bowlers were emerging.

Holder played more tests when leading players were playing World Series Cricket in 1977–78 and took 6 for 28 against Australia in Trinidad.

In 1981 he played county cricket for Shropshire in nine matches, scoring 181 runs and taking 45 wickets. At the time he was also playing club cricket for West Bromwich Dartmouth. He also played in South Africa for the Orange Free State.

After retiring he was appointed as a first-class umpire in England in 1992. Holder retired as an umpire in 2010 and as of November 2020 is the most recent non-white umpire appointed by the ECB.

During 2021 Holder was appointed as an honorary vice president of Worcestershire County Cricket Club

== Personal life ==
When his playing days came to an end Holder went on to settle in Worcestershire where he still lives to this day.
