= Maurice Foster (West Indian cricketer) =

Jamaican cricketer

Personal information
- Full name: Maurice Linton Churchill Foster
- Born: 9 May 1943 (age 83); Retreat, St Mary, Jamaica
- Batting: Right-handed
- Bowling: Right-arm off break

International information
- National side: West Indies
- Test debut (cap 130): 12 June 1969 v England
- Last Test: 28 April 1978 v Australia
- ODI debut (cap 2): 5 September 1973 v England
- Last ODI: 7 September 1973 v England

Domestic team information
- Years: Team
- 1963–1978: Jamaica

Career statistics
Competition	Tests	ODIs	FC	LA
Matches	14	2	112	9
Runs scored	580	25	6,731	151
Batting average	30.52	25.00	45.17	21.57
100s/50s	1/1	0/0	17/35	0/0
Top score	125	25	234	49
Balls bowled	1,776	30	12,431	363
Wickets	9	2	132	14
Bowling average	66.66	11.00	30.72	13.42
5 wickets in innings	0	0	2	1
10 wickets in match	0	0	0	0
Best bowling	2/41	2/22	5/65	5/24
Catches/stumpings	3/–	0/–	36/–	4/–
Medal record
Men's Cricket
Representing West Indies
ICC Cricket World Cup
Winner	1975 England
- Source: Cricket Archive, 16 October 2010

Maurice Linton Churchill Foster (born May 9, 1943) is a former cricketer from Jamaica. He played 14 Test matches and two One Day Internationals for the West Indies and he was a talented table-tennis player. He attended Wolmer's Schools. He was a member of the squad that won the 1975 Cricket World Cup.

A middle-order batsman and off-spinner, Foster played for Jamaica from 1963–64 to 1977–78, captaining the team from 1972–73 to 1977–78. After scoring centuries in the last two matches of the 1968–69 season as an opening batsman, he was selected to tour England in 1969. He scored 51 not out and 87 not out in the match against Somerset, and made his Test debut in the First Test, but scored only 4 and 3.

His next Tests were the Fourth and Fifth against India in 1970–71, when he made 36 not out, 24 not out, 99 and 18. Against New Zealand in 1971–72 he made only 93 runs at 23.25 in the first three Tests. He made his only Test hundred, 125, in the First Test against Australia in 1972–73 in front of his home crowd at Kingston, putting on 210 for the fifth wicket with Rohan Kanhai, but still played only four of the five Tests in that series.

He toured England for a second time in 1973. Although he scored 828 runs at 63.69 in the first-class matches, his only Test was in the innings victory at Lord's (the only time he was on the winning side in 14 Tests; he made 9 runs). On the tour he was offered a contract to play county cricket for Kent by Colin Cowdrey. He declined because he had a good job in Jamaica and was reluctant to uproot his family.

Thereafter his appearances were spasmodic as a new generation of batsmen emerged. His last Test, and his last first-class match, was in the Fifth Test against Australia in 1977–78 after the leading West Indies players had forfeited their Test places by signing with Kerry Packer. Years later, Cowdrey ran across Foster in Barbados and said, “You know Foster, you should have taken up that contract at Kent. Then you would have played a lot more for the West Indies.

His highest first-class score was 234 for Jamaica against Trinidad in 1976–77, and his best bowling figures were 5 for 65 against Guyana in 1971–72.

According to Michael Holding, Foster's career was affected when his wife asked him to choose between her and a tour of India. He chose her.

Foster was also, at one time, the table tennis West Indies champion. He is the brother of West Indian table tennis champions Joy Foster and the late Dave Foster.
