= Ronald Faria =

Trinidadian cricketer (1944–2024)

Personal information
- Full name: Ronald Augustus Faria
- Born: 2 August 1944; Trinidad
- Died: 28 September 2024 (aged 80)
- Batting: Left-handed
- Bowling: Right-arm medium
- Role: Batsman, occasional wicket-keeper

Domestic team information
- Years: Team
- 1967/68–1978/79: North Trinidad
- 1968/69–1976/77: Trinidad and Tobago

Career statistics
Competition	First-class	List A
Matches	52	6
Runs scored	2,084	156
Batting average	26.71	26.00
100s/50s	1/11	0/1
Top score	110*	52
Balls bowled	102	0
Wickets	3	–
Bowling average	13.66	–
5 wickets in innings	0	–
10 wickets in match	0	–
Best bowling	2/6	–
Catches/stumpings	58/6	0/0
- Source: Cricinfo, 29 April 2026

Ronald Augustus Faria (2 August 1944 – 28 September 2024) was a Trinidadian cricketer. He played in 52 first-class and 6 List A matches, mostly for Trinidad and Tobago, from 1967 to 1979.

Faria was an opening batsman who also sometimes kept wicket. His highest first-class score was 110 not out in his last match, when he captained North and East Trinidad against South and Central Trinidad in the 1978–79 Beaumont Cup.
