= Theo Cuffy =

Trinidadian cricketer

Personal information
- Full name: Theodore Cuffy
- Born: 9 November 1949 (age 77); Preysal, Trinidad
- Batting: Right-handed
- Bowling: Right-arm medium
- Role: Batsman
- Relatives: Tyrell Cuffy (son)

Domestic team information
- Years: Team
- 1976–1983: Trinidad and Tobago
- Source: CricketArchive, 19 March 2016

Theodore "Theo" Cuffy (born 9 November 1949) is a former Trinidadian cricketer who represented the Trinidad and Tobago national side in West Indian domestic cricket. He was a right-handed middle-order batsman.

Cuffy made his first-class debut in April 1967, playing for South Trinidad in the Beaumont Cup (an inter-regional competition that at the time held first-class status). He later also represented Central Trinidad and South and Central Trinidad in the competition. Cuffy's Shell Shield debut for Trinidad and Tobago came during the 1975–76 season, during which he also made his List A debut, in the Gillette Cup. He remained a regular in Trinidad's line-up for the remainder of the decade and into the first few years of the 1980s. During the 1982–83 season, he even served as the team's captain for a few matches, in the absence of regular captain Larry Gomes. Cuffy's highest first-class score was made in March 1978, when he scored 140 against the Combined Islands. Overall, he made 32 first-class and 21 limited-overs appearances for Trinidad and Tobago, spanning from 1976 to 1983.

From 1986 to 1990, Cuffy served as Trinidad and Tobago's team manager. He later qualified as a coach, and eventually began working as a coaching instructor with the West Indies Cricket Board. He coached the West Indies women's team at the 1993 Women's World Cup in England. In 1996, Cuffy relocated to the Cayman Islands, taking up a position as technical director of the Cayman Islands Cricket Association. He was initially given only a two-year contract, but chose to remain in the country permanently, only retiring from the position in 2016. During his period as technical director, Cuffy oversaw the association's successful application for associate membership of the International Cricket Council (ICC), and also coached the national team at several international tournaments. One of his sons, Tyrell Cuffy, is a sprinter, and has represented the Caymans internationally.
