= Gilbert Park =

Cricket ground in California, Trinidad and Tobago

- Interactive map of Gilbert Park

Ground information
- Location: California, Trinidad and Tobago
- Country: Trinidad and Tobago
- Coordinates: 10.4137°N 61.4716°W
- Establishment: c. 1962

Team information
Central Trinidad	(1970/71–1978/79)
- As of 17 February 2022; Source: Ground profile

Gilbert Park is a cricket and football ground in California, Trinidad and Tobago.

== History ==
The first recorded match played at Gilbert Park saw the Trinidad Colts play the touring Indians in February 1962, though the match carried no status. The ground hosted its inaugural first-class match when Central Trinidad played North Trinidad in the 1970–71 Beaumont Cup. Central Trinidad continued to play first-class matches there in that competition until 1979, playing twelve matches there. In total, fourteen first-class matches were played at Gilbert Park, with East Trinidad and South Trinidad playing the final of the 1972–73 Texaco Cup there, and a combined South and Central Trinidad cricket team playing there in 1977. First-class cricket has not returned to Gilbert Park since 1979, and the ground has never played host to matches for the Trinidad and Tobago national cricket team.

Gilbert Park was previously the home ground of W Connection F.C.

== Records ==
=== First-class ===
- Highest team total: 496 for 9 declared by North Trinidad v Central Trinidad, 1970–71
- Lowest team total: 50 all out by Central Trinidad v South Trinidad, 1975–76
- Highest individual innings: 182 by Joey Carew for North Trinidad v Central Trinidad, 1970–71
- Best bowling in an innings: 8–38 by Imtiaz Ali for East Trinidad v Central Trinidad, 1972–73
- Best bowling in a match: 10–92 by Imtiaz Ali, as above

== See also ==
- List of cricket grounds in the West Indies
- List of TT Pro League stadiums
