= Princess Royal Park, Arima =

Cricket ground in Arima, Trinidad and Tobago

Princess Royal Park
- Arima Savannah
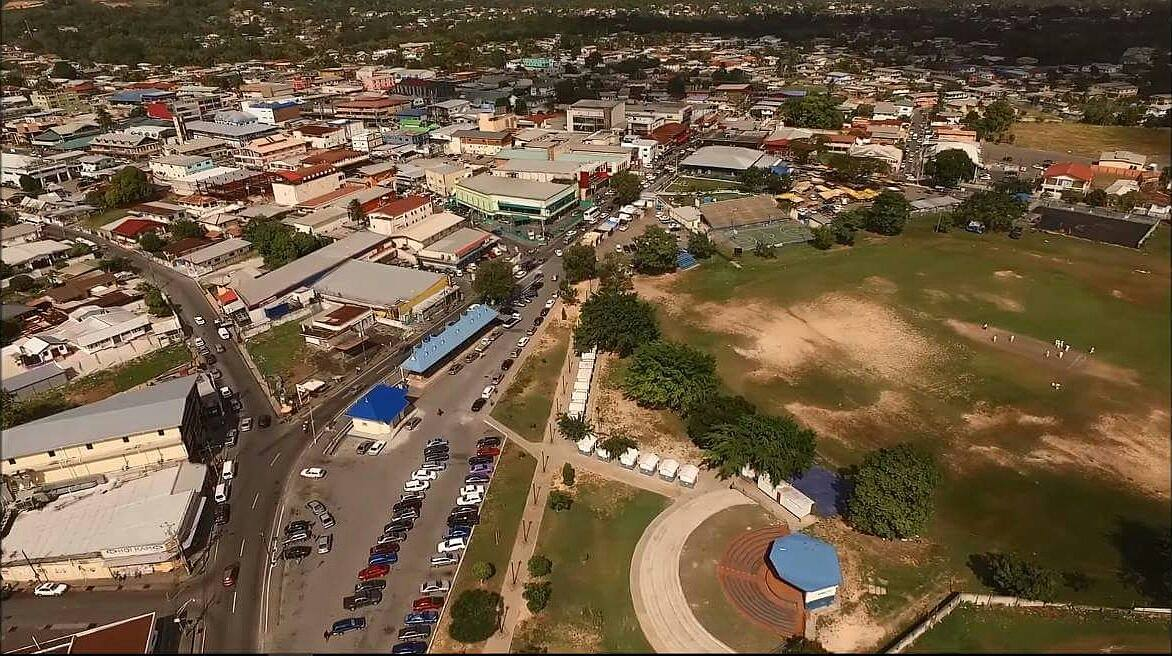
- A cricket match being played at the park (right)

Ground information
- Location: Arima, Trinidad and Tobago
- Coordinates: 10.6376°N 61.2823°W
- Establishment: c. 1962

Team information
Central Trinidad	(1970/71–1975/76)
- As of 17 February 2022; Source: Ground profile

Princess Royal Park is a public park and former major cricket venue in Arima, Trinidad and Tobago.

== History ==
Located adjacent to the Arima Velodrome, the Park was originally named Arima Savannah. It was named for the Princess Royal by the mayor of Arima, Percy Cezair, during her visit to Trinidad and Tobago in 1962. The Park later hosted two first-class cricket matches for East Trinidad, the first in the semi-final of the 1970–71 Beaumont Cup against South Trinidad, with the second coming in the 1975–76 Texaco Cup against Central Trinidad. The Park has not played host to major cricket since the 1975–76 fixture.

== Records ==
=== First-class ===
- Highest team total: 254 all out by East Trinidad v South Trinidad, 1970–71
- Lowest team total: 58 all out by East Trinidad v Central Trinidad, 1975–76
- Highest individual innings: 84 by Alvin Corneal for East Trinidad v South Trinidad, 1970–71
- Best bowling in an innings: 5-35 by Prince Bartholomew, as above
- Best bowling in a match: 9-64 by Prince Bartholomew, as above

== See also ==
- List of cricket grounds in the West Indies
