= South and Central Trinidad cricket team =

The South and Central Trinidad cricket team played first-class cricket from 1976 to 1985, competing in an annual match for the Beaumont Cup.

The Beaumont Cup was contested by South Trinidad and North Trinidad from 1925–26 to 1969–70. In 1970–71, Central Trinidad and East Trinidad were added to make up a four-team first-class competition, which was renamed the Texaco Cup in 1971–72. In 1975–76 the Beaumont Cup was revived, to be contested between South and Central Trinidad and North and East Trinidad. The two competitions ran until 1979–80, and the Beaumont Cup continued until 1984–85.

Seven first-class matches were played. South and Central Trinidad won in 1978–79 and 1979–80; North and East Trinidad won in 1976–77, 1983–84 and 1984–85; the matches in 1975–76 and 1982–83 were drawn. The match in 1977–78 was abandoned without any play. Six matches were played at Guaracara Park in Pointe-à-Pierre; the other was played at Gilbert Park in California.

South and Central Trinidad's top score was 121 by Balkaram Sagram in the two-wicket victory in 1978–79. Their best innings bowling figures were 5 for 38 by Desmond Baptiste in 1975–76, and the best match figures were 9 for 134 (4 for 56 and 5 for 78) by Shamshuddin Jumadeen in the 1978–79 match.

After their annual match lost first-class status the two teams continued to compete annually until 2000–01.
