= Charles Bain =

Cricket umpire

Personal information
- Full name: Charles Zachary Bain
- Born: 15 March 1913; Arima, Trinidad and Tobago
- Died: 8 April 2007 (aged 93); Arima, Trinidad

Umpiring information
- Tests umpired: 1 (1965)
- Source: Cricinfo, 1 July 2013

Charles Zachary Bain (15 March 1913 – 8 April 2007) was a West Indian cricket umpire. He stood in one Test match, West Indies vs. Australia, at Port of Spain, in 1965. He umpired six first-class matches, five of them in Trinidad, between 1961 and 1968. He had played for North Trinidad and South Trinidad in Beaumont Cup matches in the early 1940s.
