= Corexit =

Controversial oil dispersant

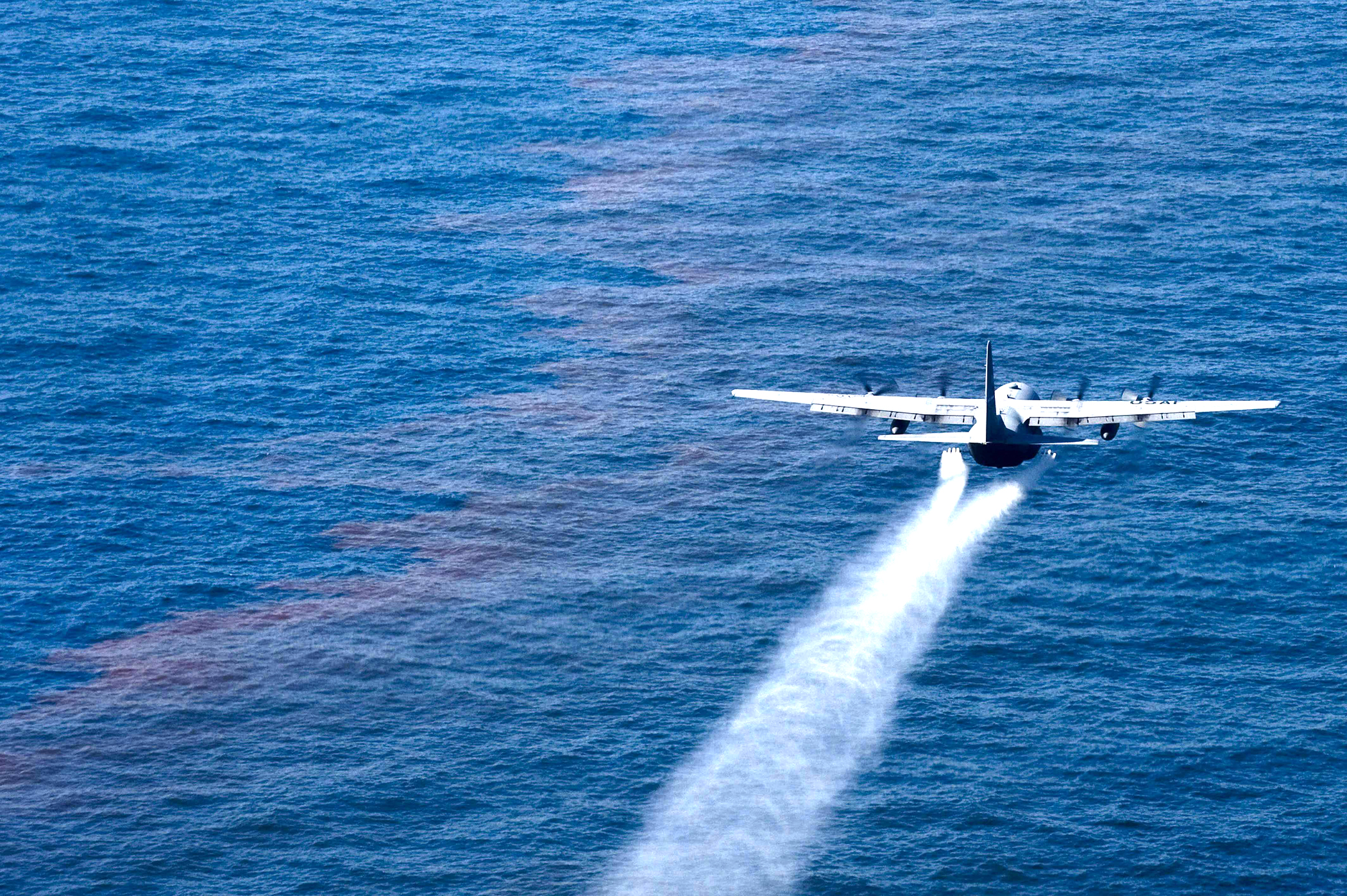
A U.S. Air Force Reserve plane sprays Corexit over the Deepwater Horizon oil spill in the Gulf of Mexico.

Corexit (often styled COREXIT) is a product line of oil dispersants used during oil spill response operations. It is produced by Nalco Holding Company, an indirect subsidiary of Ecolab. Corexit was originally developed by the Standard Oil Company of New Jersey. Corexit is typically applied by aerial spraying or spraying from ships directly onto an oil slick. On contact with the dispersant, oil that would otherwise float on the surface of the water is emulsified into tiny droplets and sinks or (in the unusual case of sub-surface application) remains suspended in the water. In theory this allows the oil to be more rapidly degraded by bacteria (bioremediation) and prevents it from accumulating on beaches and in marshes.

Corexit was used in unprecedented quantities during the 2010 Deepwater Horizon oil spill in the Gulf of Mexico and became the largest use of such chemicals in the United States. In addition to spraying the dispersant onto the surface slick, it was used in an untested, off-label manner when BP injected it at the broken well-head, roughly 1,500 m (5,000 ft) below the surface. Researchers continue to examine the effects and effectiveness of Corexit. Studies have so far indicated that the dispersant is toxic to marine life. Corexit has been shown to exert a synergistic effect when mixed with oil, increasing its toxicity.

== Ownership ==
Corexit was originally developed by the Standard Oil Company of New Jersey (SONJ) also known as Esso (phonetically derived from the acronym SO). The company later merged with Humble Oil to form Exxon, which is now part of ExxonMobil.

In 2011, Corexit became the property of Ecolab, following a merger between Ecolab and Nalco Holding Company. As of 2015, Corexit is owned by Ecolab and is manufactured by Nalco Company, an indirect subsidiary of Ecolab.

== Use ==
Dispersants are mixtures of surfactants and solvents that are commonly used to break up floating oil slicks into small droplets, which are submerged underwater. This reduces shoreline accumulation but increases the amount of oil underwater. This also increases the surface area of the oil and, in theory, accelerates the destruction of oil by naturally occurring bacteria. Dispersants are themselves a form of pollution that can be toxic to marine life, and the increased activity of bacteria from their presence can deplete oxygen in nearby waters, causing further harm to marine life. There are important trade-offs that must be considered in their use, such as the relative level of toxicity of the dispersant versus the relative toxicity of the spilled oil, to ensure that dispersant use mitigates an oil spill rather than making the problem worse.

Corexit products have been used in oil spill response activities since the late 1960s. Early products in the line included Corexit 7664 and Corexit 8666. Corexit 9527 is one of the first modern concentrate dispersants and has been in use since the mid 1970s. Corexit 9500 was designed to replace Corexit 9527. In 2002, Corexit 9527 and Corexit 9500 were the only two chemical dispersants stockpiled in large quantities in the U.S.A.

An estimated 2.5 million US gallons (9.5 megalitres) of chemicals were used in response to the supertanker SS Torrey Canyon oil spill in the United Kingdom in 1967. The incident harmed marine life and triggered the first significant international public discussions about chemical dispersants' toxicity including the costs and benefits of its deployment.

=== 1968–1988 ===
In April 1968, 300 barrels of Corexit were shipped to the scene of the stricken tanker Esso Essen off the African coast. 125 barrels of it was sprayed onto the slick by aircraft over two days, after which the slick was dispersed. Corexit was later used in response to the sinking of the Greek tanker Andron off the west African coast. Following these events, Humble Oil and Refining Co. and the Enjay Chemical Company (a subsidiary of the Standard Oil Company of New Jersey) each announced the development of Corexit 7664, describing it as non-toxic to marine life- even to shrimp at concentrations of 1% per volume of seawater. Ecotoxicological studies had been undertaken by the Institute of Marine Science at the University of Miami. Corexit 7664's point of difference was described by research chemist Dr Edward Corino to be its water base, where previous dispersants had been hydrocarbon-based and highly toxic. James Avery, Humble Oil and Refining Company's public relations representative for the eastern region confirmed that following the Torrey Canyon oil spill, another spill in the Fore River from a tanker en route to Weymouth, south of Boston hastened Corexit 7664's development.

In February 1969, following application tests in Montreal, Quebec, Canada, the Imperial Oil company announced that it had equipped its fleet of tankers and barges with Corexit for the purpose of dispersing oil spills.

In February 1970, Corexit was deployed by aircraft onto an oil slick leaking from the stricken tanker Arrow in Nova Scotia, Canada. A month later, Chevron used Corexit and another chemical dispersant called Cold Clean on and beneath an oil platform off the Louisiana coast during a spill in the Gulf of Mexico. Corexit 9527 was applied to spilled oil in Galveston, Texas in August 1984 but was said to have failed. 2,000 US gallons (7,600 L; 1,700 imp gal) of Corexit was air-dropped onto oil which leaked from the SS Puerto Rican as it sank off San Francisco later that year.

=== 1989–2015 ===
Corexit 9580 was used during the 1989 Exxon Valdez oil spill disaster in Alaska. Corexit 7764 and Corexit 9527 were both used during the 1992 Port Bonython oil spill in South Australia. 45,000 litres of Corexit 9500 and 9527 were used in the response to the Montara oil spill off Australia's north-west shelf in 2009 and 2,000 litres of Corexit 9527 were used after the Chinese bulk carrier Shen Neng was grounded on Australia's Great Barrier Reef in 2010. Corexit EC9500A and Corexit EC9527A were used during the 2010 Deepwater Horizon oil spill.

More recently, Corexit has been used in Trinidad. In July 2014, a video released by Anonymous alleged that Corexit 9500 had been used in response to the Petrotrin oil spill, where 8,000 barrels of oil leaked into the Guaracara River. The President of Petrotrin, Khalid Hassanali denied this claim but confirmed that Corexit had been used one mile off-shore near Pointe-à-Pierre.

The use of Corexit is approved in the US by the U.S. Environmental Protection Agency (EPA). This decision was called into question in 2013 following a report by the Government Accountability Project alleging "devastating long-term effects on human health and the Gulf of Mexico ecosystem" stemming from the use of Corexit.

Of the eight European countries in the Bonn Agreement, France, Germany, and the Netherlands have provisions to use Corexit 9500 in an oil spill. Belgium and Norway do not have lists of approved dispersants, but Belgium has a stockpile of Corexit 9527. The UK and Denmark keep lists of approved dispersants and have not approved of Corexit. Sweden does not use dispersant at all.

=== Deepwater Horizon oil spill ===
Approximately one week following the incident, subsidiaries of BP formally requested Nalco Company (an indirect subsidiary of Nalco Holding Company) to supply large quantities of Corexit 9500. Corexit 9500 was listed on the U.S. EPA National Contingency Plan Product Schedule and authority and direction for its use was provided by responding federal agencies. Nalco immediately provided available quantities of Corexit and increased production to supply the product to BP's subsidiaries.

On May 19, 2010 the EPA gave BP 24 hours to choose less toxic alternatives to Corexit, selected from the list of EPA-approved dispersants on the National Contingency Plan Product Schedule, and begin applying them within 72 hours of EPA approval of their choices; or, if BP could not find an alternative, to provide a report on the alternative dispersants investigated and reasons for their rejection. BP took the latter option, sending its report the next day. BP's response to dispersant alternatives was judged to be deficient by both the EPA and the US Coast Guard, requiring EPA to perform its own analysis on the relative toxicity of dispersants. Their peer-reviewed conclusions on August 2, 2010 found that Corexit 9500A was generally neither more nor less toxic than the other available dispersants, and that dispersant-oil mixtures were not generally more nor less toxic to test species than oil alone. On May 26, the EPA told BP to reduce the use of Corexit by 75%; surface use was prohibited unless a request for exemption in specific circumstances was granted, while subsurface use was capped at 15,000 US gallons (57,000 L; 12,000 imp gal) per day. After May 26 daily average use decreased 9%, an average of slightly more than 23,000 US gallons (87,000 L; 19,000 imp gal) per day.

On July 15, 2010, BP announced that it had capped the leaking well, and the application of dispersants by the response effort ceased shortly thereafter.

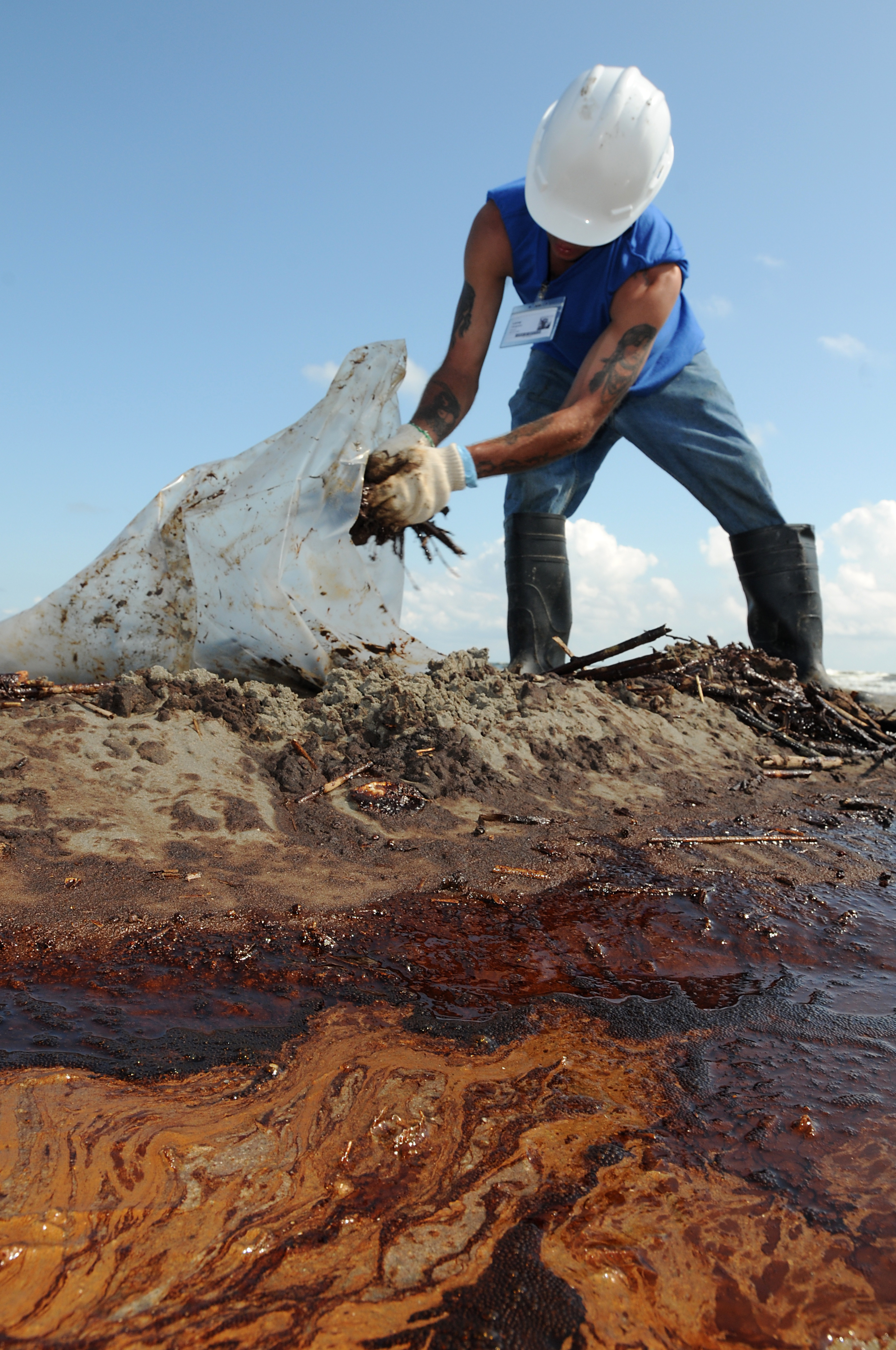
A worker cleans up oily waste on Elmer's Island, Louisiana, on May 21, 2010

The total used in the event was 1.84 million US gallons (7.0 Ml) of Corexit EC9500A and Corexit EC9527A, with roughly 58% sprayed from the air.

== Composition and Occupational Health Hazards ==
=== Corexit 9527 ===
At the beginning of the Gulf spill, the proprietary composition was not public, but the manufacturer's own safety data sheet identified the main components as 2-butoxyethanol and a proprietary organic sulfonate with a small concentration of propylene glycol. Warnings from the Hazardous Substance Fact Sheet for 2-butoxyethanol include: "Cancer Hazard: 2-Butoxy Ethanol may be a carcinogen in humans since it has been shown to cause liver cancer in animals. Many scientists believe there is no safe level of exposure to a carcinogen....Reproductive Hazard: 2-Butoxy Ethanol may damage the developing fetus. There is limited evidence that 2-Butoxy Ethanol may damage the male reproductive system (including decreasing the sperm count) in animals and may affect female fertility in animals". 2-butoxyethanol was identified as a causal agent in the health problems experienced by cleanup workers after the 1989 Exxon Valdez oil spill. According to the Alaska Community Action on Toxics, the use of Corexit during the spill caused people "respiratory, nervous system, liver, kidney and blood disorders".

=== Corexit 9500 ===
In response to public pressure, the EPA and Nalco released the list of the six ingredients in Corexit 9500, revealing constituents including sorbitan, butanedioic acid, and petroleum distillates. Corexit EC9500A is made mainly of hydrotreated light petroleum distillates, propylene glycol and a proprietary organic sulfonate. According to The New York Times, "Nalco had previously declined to identify the third hazardous substance in the 9500 formula, but EPA's website reveals it to be dioctyl sodium sulfosuccinate, a detergent and common ingredient in laxatives". Environmentalists also pressured NALCO to reveal to the public what concentrations of each chemical are in the product; NALCO considered such information a trade secret, but shared it with the EPA.

== Toxicity ==
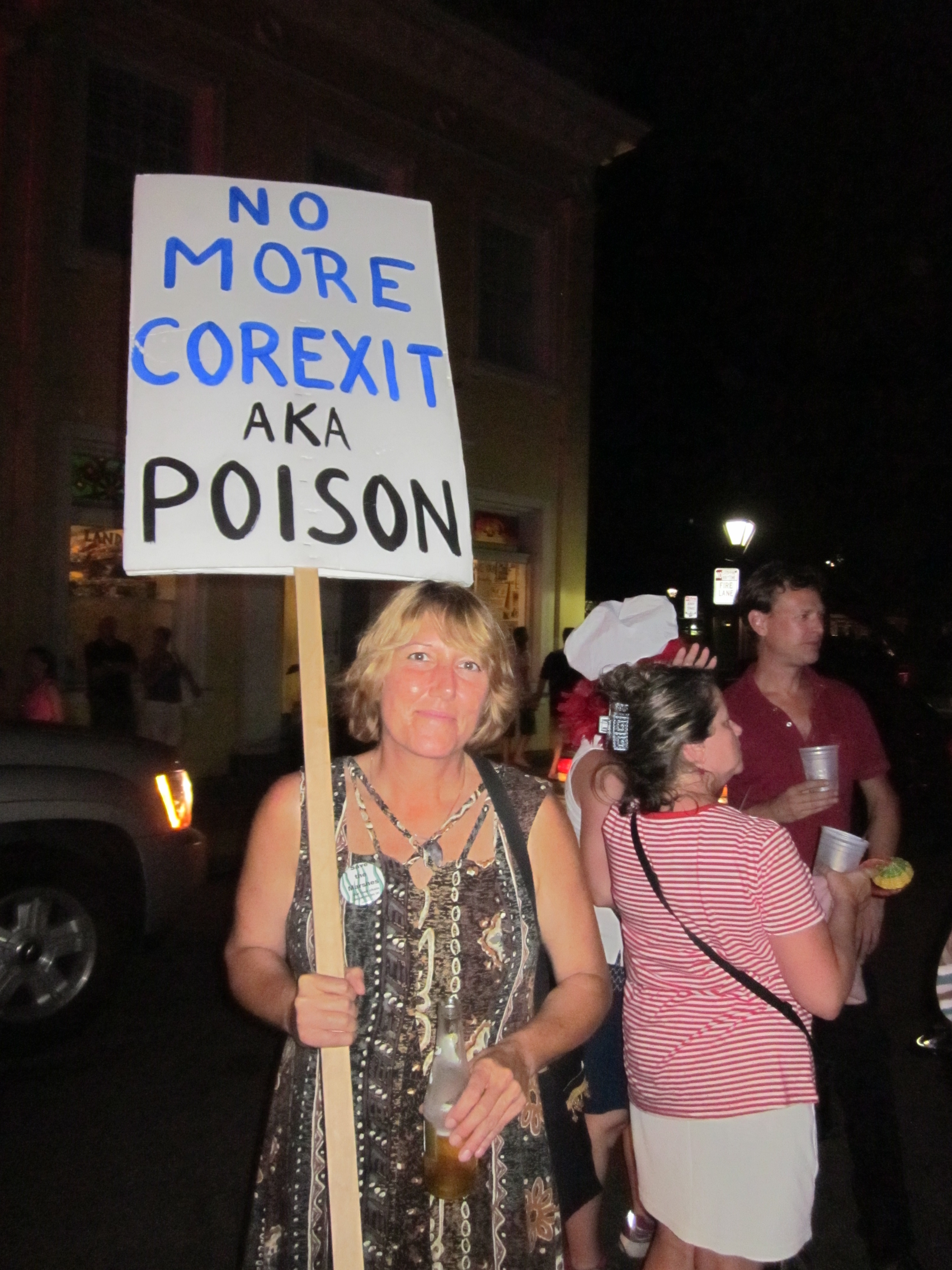
Sign protesting use of toxic "Corexit" chemical dispersant in the BP Gulf of Mexico oil disaster, at the Bastille Day Tumble, French Quarter, New Orleans

Corexit is banned in the United Kingdom due to concerns about possible adverse health effects on people using it.

Prior to the 2010 Gulf spill, the majority of studies performed on Corexit tested for effectiveness in dispersing oil, rather than for toxicity. The manufacturer's safety data sheet states "No toxicity studies have been conducted on this product...", but later concludes: "The potential human hazard is: Low." Nevertheless, according to the manufacturer's website, workers applying Corexit should wear breathing protection and work in a ventilated area.

Compared with 12 other dispersants listed by the EPA, Corexit 9500 and 9527 are either similarly toxic or 10 to 20 times more toxic. In a preliminary EPA study of eight different dispersants, Corexit 9500 was found to be less toxic to some marine life than other dispersants and to break down within weeks, rather than settling to the bottom of the ocean or collecting in the water. None of the eight dispersants tested were "without toxicity", according to an EPA administrator. During the 2010 spill, the ecological effect of mixing the dispersants with oil was unknown, as was the toxicity of the breakdown products of the dispersant.

Rhode Island Sen. Sheldon Whitehouse said the EPA was not prepared to responsibly authorize BP's use of Corexit, but did so anyway. He noted that manufacturers could nominate themselves to EPA's list of approved dispersants. Although they had to provide data on both efficacy and toxicity, there was no official toxicity limit to bar approval.

Chemist Wilma Subra expressed her concern about the danger of the Corexit-crude mixture, telling GAP investigators, "The short-term health symptoms include acute respiratory problems, skin rashes, cardiovascular impacts, gastrointestinal impacts, and short-term loss of memory....long-term impacts include cancer, decreased lung function, liver damage, and kidney damage."

Nalco spokesman Charlie Pajor said that oil mixed with Corexit is "more toxic to marine life, but less toxic to life along the shore and animals at the surface" because the dispersant allows the oil to stay submerged below the surface of the water. Corexit causes oil to form into small droplets in the water; fish may be harmed when they eat these droplets. According to its Material safety data sheet, Corexit may also bioaccumulate, remaining in the flesh and building up over time. Thus predators who eat smaller fish with the toxin in their systems may end up with much higher levels in their flesh. The influence of Corexit on microbiological communities is a topic of ongoing research.

Corexit 9527, considered by the EPA to be an acute health hazard, is stated by its manufacturer to be potentially harmful to red blood cells, the kidneys and the liver, and may irritate eyes and skin.

Like 9527, 9500 can also cause hemolysis (spontaneous rupture of the blood cells) and may also cause internal bleeding. According to BP data, 20 percent of offshore workers had levels of 2-Butoxyethanol two times higher than the level certified as safe by the Occupational Safety and Health Administration.

During a Senate hearing on the use of dispersants, Senator Lisa Murkowski asked EPA administrator Lisa P. Jackson whether Corexit use should be banned, stating she didn't want dispersants to be "the Agent Orange of this oil spill".

According to a NALCO manual obtained by GAP, Corexit 9527 is an "eye and skin irritant. Repeated or excessive exposure ... may cause injury to red blood cells (hemolysis), kidney or the liver." The manual adds: "Excessive exposure may cause central nervous system effects, nausea, vomiting, anesthetic or narcotic effects." It advises, "Do not get in eyes, on skin, on clothing," and "Wear suitable protective clothing." For Corexit 9500 the manual advised, "Do not get in eyes, on skin, on clothing," "Avoid breathing vapor," and "Wear suitable protective clothing." Neither the protective gear, nor the manual were distributed to Gulf oil spill cleanup workers, according to FOIA requests obtained by GAP.

A study of 247 BP oil spill clean-up workers released in September 2013 by the American Journal of Medicine showed the workers were at an increased risk of developing cancer, leukemia and other illnesses. The study concluded that "clean-up workers exposed to the oil spill and dispersant experienced significantly altered blood profiles, liver enzymes, and somatic symptoms."

=== Studies ===
Alabama researchers found that the dispersant killed plankton and disrupted the Gulf of Mexico's food web, noting that it is "like the middle part of the food chain has been taken away".

In late 2012, a study from Georgia Tech and Universidad Autonoma de Aguascalientes in Environmental Pollution journal reported that Corexit used during the BP oil spill had increased the toxicity of the oil by up to 52 times. The study looked at the effects of the oil–Corexit combination on rotifers, which form the base of the food chain. Georgia Tech lab professor Terry Snell said, "There is a synergistic interaction between crude oil and the dispersant that makes it more toxic". He said the addition of Corexit to the gulf spill "probably put a big dent in the planktonic food web for some extended period of time, but nobody really made the measurements to figure out the impact." The leader of the study, Roberto Rico-Martinez (UAA), said "Dispersants are pre-approved to help clean up oil spills and are widely used during disasters....but we have a poor understanding of their toxicity. Our study indicates the increase in toxicity may have been greatly underestimated following the Macondo well explosion." Snell commented: "What remains to be determined is whether the benefits of dispersing the oil by using Corexit are outweighed by the substantial increase in toxicity of the mixture...Perhaps we should allow the oil to naturally disperse. It might take longer, but it would have less toxic impact on marine ecosystems." On their own, oil and Corexit were found to be equally toxic.

A study released by Florida State University and Utrecht University, Netherlands in November 2012, found Corexit made oil sink faster and more deeply into the beaches, and possibly groundwater supplies. The researchers found that Corexit 9500A allowed the toxic components of crude oil (PAHs) to permeate sand where, due to a lack of sunlight, degradation is slowed. The authors explained, "The causes of the reduced PAH retention after dispersant application has several reasons: 1) the dispersant transforms the oil containing the PAHs into small micelles that can penetrate through the interstitial space of the sand. 2) the coating of the oil particles produced by the dispersant reduces the sorption to the sand grains, 3) saline conditions enhance the adsorption of dispersant to sand surfaces, thereby reducing the sorption of oil to the grains".

A 2012 study clearly suggests that Corexit is highly toxic to early life stages of coral. From the paper, "Even at a low concentration (0.86 ppm) of oil-dispersant mixture diluted over 96 hours, most of the mountainous star coral did not survive".

Studies from Florida showed toxic effects of the oil and Corexit mixture on phytoplankton as well as on larger species, including conch, oysters and shrimp.

Surfrider Foundation released preliminary results of their study "State of the Beach" in which they found that Corexit appears to make it tougher for microbes to digest the oil. Organic pollutants (PAHs) stay above carcinogenic levels by NIH and OSHA standards owing to inhibition by Corexit of the microbial degradation of hydrocarbons in crude oil. Through the use of 'newly developed' UV light equipment, researchers were able to detect PAHs in sand and on human skin. Corexit, they said, allows these toxins to be absorbed into the skin and cannot be wiped off. The mixture of Corexit and crude is absorbed into wet skin faster than dry.

In 2012, researchers for the Minnesota Department of Natural Resources found evidence of petroleum compounds and Corexit components in the eggs of nesting pelicans that had migrated to the Gulf of Mexico and back to Minnesota. Because Corexit is an endocrine disruptor, researchers said the chemicals can disrupt hormone balance and affect embryo development.

Toxins in the Corexit–oil mixture (PAHs) were found to permeate human skin at an accelerated pace due to the presence of the solvent.

When oil is dispersed, it is distributed in three dimensions (in the water column) rather than just two (on the surface). USF scientists found that the untested undersea application of the dispersant created abundant oil plumes in the middle of the Gulf of Mexico. In 2013 it was reported that everywhere along the track that a plume had drifted, a massive die-off of benthic foraminifera was left in its wake.

== Effectiveness ==
According to the EPA, Corexit EC9500A (formerly "Corexit 9500") was 54.7% effective, while Corexit EC9527A was 63.4% effective in the dispersion of Louisiana crude. The EPA lists 12 other dispersants as being more effective in dealing with oil in a way that is safe for wildlife.

Reports from Florida scientists showed Corexit "may not have done its job properly" and that the dispersant "does not seem to facilitate the degradation of the oil" by oil-eating bacteria. Evidence from researchers at Florida Institute of Oceanography showed Corexit did not degrade as promised. Studies by Woods Hole Oceanographic Institute conducted in January 2011 indicated that the 800,000 US gallons (3,000,000 L; 670,000 imp gal) of Corexit applied at BP's Macondo well-head "did nothing to break up the oil and simply drifted into the ecosystem".

In December 2012, a study found that Corexit may have been unnecessary, because the leaking jet of oil at the wellhead had sufficient turbulence to disperse the oil without chemical dispersant.

== Litigation ==
In April 2012, Center for Biological Diversity, the Surfrider Foundation, and Pacific Environment filed a lawsuit against the EPA and the US Coast Guard, saying the agencies failed to adequately study the chemicals in Corexit and dispersed oil without regard to environmental effects.

US District Judge Carl Barbier in December 2012 dismissed all claims against the manufacturer of Corexit, stating that such claims would become an "obstacle to federal law." Barbier held that Nalco did not determine how and in what quantities Corexit was administered during the Deepwater Horizon oil spill.

== Criticism ==
EPA whistleblower Hugh Kaufman gave an interview to Democracy Now during the height of the Deepwater Horizon Oil Spill news coverage and explained his views on the use of Corexit, saying "EPA now is taking the position that they really don't know how dangerous it is, even though if you read the label, it tells you how dangerous it is. And, for example, in the Exxon Valdez case, people who worked with dispersants, most of them are dead now. The average death age is around fifty. It's very dangerous. ... It's an economic protector of BP, not an environmental protector of the public."

Marine toxicologist Riki Ott blamed BP for poisoning locals with Corexit, which she alleges they used to hide their responsibility. In August 2010 she wrote an open letter to the Environmental Protection Agency alleging that dispersants were still being used in secret and demanding that the agency take action. The letter was published in the Huffington Post. Ott told Al Jazeera:

"The dispersants used in BP's draconian experiment contain solvents, such as petroleum distillates and 2-butoxyethanol. Solvents dissolve oil, grease, and rubber. It should be no surprise that solvents are also notoriously toxic to people, something the medical community has long known."

== See also ==
- Dispersit
