= Guaracara Park =

Sports venue in Trinidad and Tobago

- Location: Pointe-à-Pierre, Trinidad and Tobago
- Coordinates: 10°18′37″N 61°27′05″W
- Tenants: Trinidad and Tobago
- As of 28 March 2016; Source: CricketArchive

Guaracara Park is a cricket and football ground owned and operated by Trinidad and Tobago's state enterprise that primarily deals with the refining of crude petroleum, Petrotrin. It is located within the confines of their oil refinery at Pointe-à-Pierre. The ground is situated on the northern bank of the Guaracara River. The oil refinery with its gas flare is clearly visible from the ground.

== History ==
Between 1960 and 2011, 75 matches of first-class cricket were played at Guaracara Park. It was first used in representative cricket in 1947–48 when the touring MCC played a one-day match against South Trinidad. In 1948, it replaced Skinner Park in San Fernando as South Trinidad's home ground in matches for the Beaumont Cup.

The first match of first-class cricket at Guaracara Park was played between Trinidad and MCC in 1959–60, when David Allen took 7 for 33 and 3 for 30 to give MCC victory on a pitch helpful to the spin bowlers. From 1960 to 1985 first-class matches in the Beaumont Cup and Texaco Cup were played there, along with several first-class matches between Trinidad and touring international teams between 1960 and 2000. Trinidad has played Regional Four Day Competition matches at Guaracara Park since 1981–82, including the finals in 1995–96, 2005–05 and 2006–07.

The highest score at the ground, and only double-century, is 202 by Phil Simmons for Trinidad against Guyana in 1991–92. The best innings bowling figures are 8 for 27 by Prince Bartholomew for North and East Trinidad against South and Central Trinidad in 1975–76, and the best match figures are 13 for 74 (6 for 45 and 7 for 29) by Stuart MacGill for the Australians against the West Indies Board President's XI in 1998–99.

Until the installation of floodlights at the Queens Park Oval in 2008, all of Trinidad and Tobago's domestic limited-overs night matches took place at Guaracara Park due to the availability of floodlights there. Guaracara Park has now been superseded as southern Trinidad's major cricket venue by the Brian Lara Cricket Academy ground, about two kilometres to the southeast, which began hosting major cricket matches in 2017.
