= Sheldon Gomes =

Trinidad and Tobago cricketer (1950–2020)

Personal information
- Full name: Sheldon Anthony Gomes
- Born: 18 October 1950; Arima, Trinidad
- Died: 15 September 2020 (aged 69); Las Vegas, Nevada, United States
- Batting: Right-handed
- Bowling: Right-arm medium-pace
- Relatives: Larry Gomes (brother)

Domestic team information
- Years: Team
- 1968-69 to 1982-83: Trinidad and Tobago
- 1968-69 to 1973-74: North Trinidad
- 1970-71 to 1978-79: East Trinidad
- 1975-76 to 1982-83: North and East Trinidad

Career statistics
Competition	First-class	List A
Matches	55	14
Runs scored	2645	188
Batting average	32.65	14.46
100s/50s	5/15	0/0
Top score	213	46
Balls bowled	69	30
Wickets	0	0
Bowling average	–	–
5 wickets in innings	0	0
10 wickets in match	0	n/a
Best bowling	–	–
Catches/stumpings	45/–	4/–
- Source: Cricinfo, 14 July 2019

Sheldon Anthony Gomes (18 October 1950 – 15 September 2020) was a cricketer who played first-class and List A cricket for Trinidad and Tobago and other Trinidad teams from 1969 to 1983.

Gomes' highest first-class score was 213 against Jamaica in the 1976-77 Shell Shield. That was also his most prolific first-class season, with 633 runs at an average of 70.33 and three centuries.

His brother Larry Gomes played Test cricket for the West Indies. Gomes died in Las Vegas, Nevada, on 15 September 2020. He was of Portuguese descent.
