= David Furlonge =

Trinidadian cricketer (born 1958)

Personal information
- Full name: David Carl Furlonge
- Born: 15 June 1958 (age 68); Trinidad
- Batting: Left-handed

Domestic team information
- Years: Team
- 1981-82 to 1984-85: Trinidad and Tobago
- Source: Cricinfo, 28 November 2020

David Carl Furlonge (born 15 June 1958) is a Trinidadian cricketer and coach. He played in four first-class and five List A matches for Trinidad and Tobago from 1981 to 1984. He also played first-class cricket for North Trinidad and North and East Trinidad.

Furlonge was appointed as national cricket coach of Trinidad in 2020.
