= Petrotrin oil spill =

2013 oil spills on Trinidad and Tobago

The Petrotrin oil spill was a series of oil spills that occurred on the island of Trinidad and Tobago.

In total, eleven oil spills occurred between 17 December 2013 and 29 December 2013. The first spill began on 17 December at 4:45 a.m. when the 16-inch (410 mm) sea line No 10, operated by the Trinidad's national oil company Petrotrin, ruptured at the bottom of the Gulf of Paria near the company's Pointe-a-Pierre refinery. It was initially reported as a single oil spill near the southwestern town of La Brea but by the end of the month, ten more oil spills were confirmed. It is the largest oil spill in the history of Trinidad and Tobago, with a reported leakage of 7,000 barrels

Petrotrin has been facing a lot of scrutiny since the spill due to a report that revealed the pipeline that exploded may not have been inspected in over seventeen years. The company was subsequently fined $20 million by the country's Environment Management Authority. Petrotrin has taken responsibility for nine out of the eleven spills and blaming the other two on saboteurs.

== Clean-up ==
To clean up the oil spill, Petrotrin has opted to use the Corexit 9500 dispersant that was employed BP in the 2010 Deepwater Horizon oil spill. The purpose of oil dispersants is to accelerate the process of degrading oil. Oil that is spilled into a body of water will eventually break down naturally but it is a long process. The way that this dispersant functions is by breaking down oil into tiny droplets that are faster for nature to degrade. This allows two liquids that do not go well together, such as oil and water, to be able to mix. The use of this dispersant has proved to be a controversial decision because in a recent story conducted in 2012, scientists discovered that Corexit actually increases the toxicity of oil and is detrimental to the livelihood of the marine animals.

== Impact ==
=== Environmental ===
There are somewhere between 400 and 500 different species of marine fish as well as 21 different types of freshwater fish. There are also many mammals, reptiles and amphibians that inhabit the bodies of water that surround Trinidad. The Petrotrin oil spill has had an adverse effect on this diverse ecosystem. The spill has put the country's marine and freshwater animals that inhabit the bodies of water near the Pointe-a-Pierre base, such as Queen's beach, Coffee beach and the Caribbean Ocean, in harm's way. Several fishermen have reported seeing many oil-soaked birds as well as many dead fish near beaches close to the oil spill.

The quality of air in Trinidad has suffered as a result. Directly following the oil spill, residents of nearby areas reported smelling a very potent odor. It was eventually discovered that the residents were smelling toxic fumes that were being produced from the oil spill. The toxic fumes have forced some residents to temporarily relocate to avoid getting sick. The Environment Management Authority is still conducting test to see if there is still any damage to the quality of air.

=== Social ===
There is a sizeable fishing community in Trinidad due to the country's convenient location between the Caribbean Sea and the Atlantic Ocean. The fishermen who live in the affected region have been struggling to support themselves and their families since the spill. Many of them are struggling to get their boats running in the oil soaked water and the ones who are able to get the boats working are only catching a few fish. The company has promised to reimburse any fishermen who have received a loss of income as a result of the oil spill. So far Petrotrin have reimbursed the fishermen of Cedros $2.6 million and they're still negotiating with the fishermen of La Brea and Point Fortin.

An open flame ban was imposed on the residents of La Brea, which is one of the communities that is situated nearest to Petrotrin's oil refinery, directly following the spill. This ban prevented the people of La Brea from cooking any meals. Petrotrin has been providing the people of La Brea with three meals a day to compensate for the inabilility to cook.

=== Legal Implications ===
After the oil spill incident, affected residents and environmental groups pursued legal action to address the damage to their communities and livelihoods. One prominent case was initiated by the La Brea Environs Protectors (LBEP), a non-profit organization registered at the heavy oil spills that impacted the La Brea area. The LBEP alleged Petrotrin's negligence in maintaining pipelines caused the spill, leading to environmental harm, economic loss, and health risks. They also criticized the Occupational Safety and Health Agency (OSHA) for failing to enforce adequate safety standards.

However, the case faced significant legal burdens. The court ultimately ruled that the LBEP could not represent its members, as it did not exist at the time of the spill and, therefore, lacked standing. Furthermore, the Judicial Committee of the Privy Council upheld this decision, emphasizing the importance of legal standing in environmental lawsuits.

Regardless, nearly 100 residents gained permission to pursue a multi-million dollar negligence lawsuit against Petrotrin. This ongoing case highlights individuals' challenges when seeking compensation for environmental disasters. Overall, these legal proceedings highlight broader issues of environmental justice. The residents' struggle emphasizes marginalized communities' challenges in holding powerful corporate entities accountable. Meanwhile, the ongoing litigation points to ensuring that environmental laws are enforced equitably and that those affected by ecological disasters are sufficiently represented and heard.
