= Prince Bartholomew =

West Indian cricketer

Personal information
- Full name: Prince Charles Smith Bartholomew
- Born: October 9, 1939; San Juan, Trinidad and Tobago
- Died: April 25, 2017 (aged 77); Trinidad and Tobago
- Batting: Right-handed
- Bowling: Right-arm fast-medium

Domestic team information
- Years: Team
- 1968-69 to 1976-77: Trinidad
- 1968-69 to 1969-70: North Trinidad
- 1970-71 to 1978-79: East Trinidad

Career statistics
Competition	First-class	List A
Matches	57	6
Runs scored	1598	12
Batting average	23.85	4.00
100s/50s	0/9	0/0
Top score	95 not out	8
Balls bowled	7758	328
Wickets	141	6
Bowling average	25.56	37.16
5 wickets in innings	2	0
10 wickets in match	0	n/a
Best bowling	8/27	3/36
Catches/stumpings	27/–	2/–
- Source: Cricket Archive, 24 July 2014

Prince Charles Smith Bartholomew (9 October 1939 – 25 April 2017) was a Trinidad cricketer who played first-class cricket from 1969 to 1978.

An opening bowler and middle-order batsman, Bartholomew made his first-class debut in 1968-69. He had his most successful season with both bat and ball in 1970-71, scoring 325 runs at an average of 40.62 and taking 27 wickets at 21.96. He scored 95 not out and 53 not out for Trinidad against Guyana in the Shell Shield, which Trinidad won. Captaining East Trinidad in the Beaumont Cup, he took 5 for 35, 4 for 29, 2 for 33 and 2 for 73, as well as top-scoring in the final with 82, to lead East Trinidad to the title in their first season in the competition.

Captaining North and East Trinidad in their first match in the Beaumont Cup in 1975-76, he took 8 for 27, which remain the best figures in the competition.

Bartholomew captained Trinidad in the 1975-76 season, when they shared the Shell Shield title with Barbados, and captained East Trinidad in most of their first-class matches from 1971 to 1979.
