= Alvin Corneal =

Trinidad and Tobago footballer and cricketer

Personal information
- Full name: Alvin Ainsley Corneal
- Date of birth: 13 October 1937 (age 89)
- Place of birth: San Juan, Trinidad and Tobago
- Position: Forward

Senior career*
Years	Team	Apps	(Gls)
- Maple

International career
1959–1967	Trinidad and Tobago	24	(13)
1962	Barbados	3	(1)

Managerial career
- 1994–1997: NC State Wolfpack
- * Club domestic league appearances and goals

Alvin Corneal
Cricket information
- Batting: Left-handed

Domestic team information
- Years: Team
- 1958–59 to 1959–60: South Trinidad
- 1959–60 to 1970–71: Trinidad
- 1962–63 to 1969–70: North Trinidad
- 1970–71 to 1976–77: East Trinidad

Career statistics
Competition	First-class
Matches	40
Runs scored	2236
Batting average	32.88
100s/50s	3/12
Top score	128
Balls bowled	1012
Wickets	9
Bowling average	45.33
5 wickets in innings	0
10 wickets in match	0
Best bowling	2/20
Catches/stumpings	32/–
- Source: Cricket Archive, 7 July 2014

Alvin Ainsley Corneal (born 13 October 1937) is a Trinidad and Tobago former footballer. Corneal also played three unofficial matches with Barbados in 1962 when the latter was not yet a FIFA member. He also played 40 matches of first-class cricket for Trinidad and Tobago and other Trinidad teams between 1959 and 1977 as an opening batsman.

He also coached NC State Wolfpack women's soccer.

== See also ==
- List of association footballers who have been capped for two senior national teams
