= North and East Trinidad cricket team =

The North and East Trinidad cricket team played first-class cricket from 1976 to 1985, competing in an annual match for the Beaumont Cup.

The Beaumont Cup was contested by South Trinidad and North Trinidad from 1925–26 to 1969–70. In 1970–71, Central Trinidad and East Trinidad were added to make up a four-team first-class competition, which was renamed the Texaco Cup in 1971–72. In 1975–76 the Beaumont Cup was revived, to be contested between North and East Trinidad and South and Central Trinidad. The two competitions ran until 1979–80, and the Beaumont Cup continued until 1984–85.

Seven first-class matches were played. North and East Trinidad won in 1976–77, 1983–84 and 1984–85; South and Central Trinidad won in 1978–79 and 1979–80; the matches in 1975–76 and 1982–83 were drawn. The match in 1977–78 was abandoned without any play. Six matches were played at Guaracara Park in Pointe-à-Pierre and the other at Gilbert Park in California – all home matches for South and Central Trinidad.

North and East Trinidad's top score was 119 by Sheldon Gomes in the innings victory in 1976–77. Their best innings bowling figures were 8 for 27 by Prince Bartholomew in 1975–76, and their best match bowling figures were 9 for 98 (5 for 52 and 4 for 66) by Ganesh Mahabir in 1982–83.

After their annual match lost first-class status the two teams continued to compete annually until 2000–01.
