= List of TT Pro League stadiums =

Locations of past and present TT Pro League stadiums

The following is a list of TT Pro League stadiums that have hosted a TT Pro League match since its inception in 1999. The Pro League serves as Trinidad and Tobago's highest level of association football and the annual league tournament has hosted matches in sixteen football stadiums. The inaugural round of Pro League matches took place on 31 March 1999 with four clubs hosting the opening fixtures.

After Trinidad and Tobago was awarded the 2001 FIFA U-17 World Championship, the country constructed four football-specific stadiums named after the country's all-time leading sportsmen: Ato Boldon, Dwight Yorke, Larry Gomes, and Manny Ramjohn. The four stadiums again played host to an international football competition with the 2010 FIFA U-17 Women's World Cup. The National Stadium, built in 1980, is the oldest and longest serving stadium in the TT Pro League. The stadium was renamed in honour of Hasely Crawford after the stadium underwent major renovation to host the semi-final, third-place, and final matches of the 2001 FIFA U–17 World Championship. Moreover, with the seating expansion the stadium is now the largest in the country with a capacity of 27,000 and serves as the current home to Morvant Caledonia United, Defence Force, Police, and St. Ann's Rangers.

In addition, TT Pro League matches have also been hosted by Marvin Lee Stadium. The Macoya-based stadium was built and opened in 1996 with a 6,000 spectator capacity and is housed together with the Dr. João Havelange Centre of Excellence. In 2007, Marvin Lee Stadium became the first Caribbean stadium to install an artificial playing surface, reportedly costing in excess of TT$8 million and was supported through a developmental grant from FIFA.

== Stadiums ==
Key
**Bold**	Hosted a match during the current season
Italics	Stadium has been demolished

Stadium	Image	Club(s)	Location	Opened	Closed	Capacity	Coordinates	Ref(s)
Arima Velodrome		Arima Fire	Arima			9,500	10°38′13″N 61°17′2″W	
**Ato Boldon Stadium**		Central FC; South Starworld Strikers	Couva	2001		10,000	10°25′29″N 61°25′2″W	
Dwight Yorke Stadium		Tobago United	Bacolet	2001		7,500	11°10′53″N 60°43′2″W	
Frederick Settlement		Doc's Khelwalaas	Caroni	2000			10°36′36″N 61°22′48″W	
Gilbert Park		W Connection	Couva				10°24′49″N 61°28′18″W	
Guaracara Park		W Connection	Pointe-a-Pierre	1959		5,000	10°18′37″N 61°27′5″W	
**Hasely Crawford Stadium**	National Stadium	Defence Force; Ma Pau; Police; San Juan Jabloteh; St. Ann's Rangers	Mucurapo	1980		27,000	10°39′41″N 61°31′58″W	
**Larry Gomes Stadium**		Arima Fire; Morvant Caledonia United	Malabar	2001		10,000	10°36′59″N 61°16′57″W	
**Mahaica Oval**		Point Fortin Civic; Club Sando	Point Fortin			2,500	10°10′4″N 61°40′32″W	
**Manny Ramjohn Stadium**		FC South End; T&TEC; W Connection; Police	Marabella	2001		10,000	10°18′12″N 61°26′20″W	
**Marvin Lee Stadium**	Marvin Lee Stadium	Joe Public	Macoya	1996		6,000	10°38′29″N 61°23′5″W	
Palo Seco Velodrome		United Petrotrin	Palo Seco			10,000	10°5′4″N 61°36′5″W	
PSA Ground		FUTGOF	Saint James				10°40′39″N 61°31′43″W	
Queen's Park Oval	Queen's Park Oval	Defence Force; San Juan Jabloteh	Port of Spain	1896		25,000	10°40′2″N 61°31′25″W	
Sangre Grande Regional Complex		North East Stars	Sangre Grande			7,100	10°34′0″N 61°8′0″W	
Skinner Park		Police	San Fernando	1930		5,000	10°15′59″N 61°27′37″W	
