= Leo John =

Trinidadian cricketer (1936–2021)

Personal information
- Born: 25 June 1936; Chaguanus, Trinidad
- Died: 13 May 2021 (aged 84)
- Batting: Right-handed
- Bowling: Right-arm off-break

Domestic team information
- Years: Team
- 1958/59–1969/70: South Trinidad
- 1963/64–1968/69: Trinidad and Tobago
- 1970/71–1978/79: Central Trinidad
- Source: ESPNcricinfo, 14 November 2016

Leo John (25 June 1936 – 13 May 2021) was a Trinidadian former cricketer. He played twenty-five first-class matches for Trinidad and Tobago, South Trinidad and Central Trinidad between 1958/59 and 1978/79.

John died on 13 May 2021, at the age of 84.
