= Alston Daniel =

West Indian cricketer

Personal information
- Full name: Alston Emmanuel Daniel
- Born: 16 July 1960 (age 66); Carnbee, Tobago
- Batting: Right-handed
- Bowling: Slow left-arm orthodox

Domestic team information
- Years: Team
- 1978-79: Tobago
- 1980-81 to 1982-83: Trinidad and Tobago

Career statistics
Competition	First-class
Matches	9
Runs scored	79
Batting average	7.90
100s/50s	0/0
Top score	24
Balls bowled	1341
Wickets	21
Bowling average	36.90
5 wickets in innings	0
10 wickets in match	0
Best bowling	4/54
Catches/stumpings	2/0
- Source: Cricinfo, 22 November 2020

Alston Emmanuel Daniel (born 16 July 1960) is a former cricketer who played first-class cricket for Tobago and Trinidad and Tobago from 1978 to 1983.

== Life and career ==
Daniel was awarded a scholarship to attend the Tobago Institute of Education, where he obtained his secondary education and captained the cricket team. He represented Trinidad and Tobago at youth level.

When Tobago was promoted to first-class status for its inclusion in the Texaco Cup competition in 1978-79 alongside the four regional Trinidad sides, Daniel played in all four matches, at the age of 18. With his left-arm spin, he was Tobago's most successful bowler, taking 11 wickets at an average of 29.00. Tobago finished at the bottom of the competition and played no further first-class cricket, but Daniel later played three matches for Trinidad in the West Indian Regional Four Day Competition, and was also selected in the West Indies Board President's XI that played against the touring English team in 1980–81. He was the first Tobagonian to represent Trinidad and Tobago at cricket, and the first Tobagonian to play for a West Indies team.

Daniel continued playing for Tobago until 1993, capturing over 200 wickets. He then became a prominent coach in Tobago, and managed Tobago youth cricket teams from 1998 to 2004.
