= Ganesh Mahabir =

Trinidadian cricketer (born 1958)

Personal information
- Born: 14 April 1958 (age 68); Tunapuna, Trinidad
- Batting: Right-handed
- Bowling: Leg Spin
- Role: Bowler

Domestic team information
- Years: Team
- 1975/76–1976/77: East Trinidad
- 1982/83–1984/85: North and East Trinidad
- 1982/83–1987/88: Trinidad and Tobago

Career statistics
Competition	First-class
Matches	33
Runs scored	226
Batting average	6.27
100s/50s	0/0
Top score	21
Balls bowled	6,891
Wickets	138
Bowling average	22.73
5 wickets in innings	4
10 wickets in match	0
Best bowling	6/62
Catches/stumpings	20/–
- Source: Cricinfo, 8 April 2022

Ganesh Mahabir (born 14 April 1958) is a Trinidadian cricketer who featured as a leg spinner. He played in 33 first-class matches for Trinidad and Tobago from 1975 to 1988, taking 138 wickets at an average of 22.73 in his first-class career.
