= Pointe-à-Pierre Wild Fowl Trust =

Non-profit environment NGO

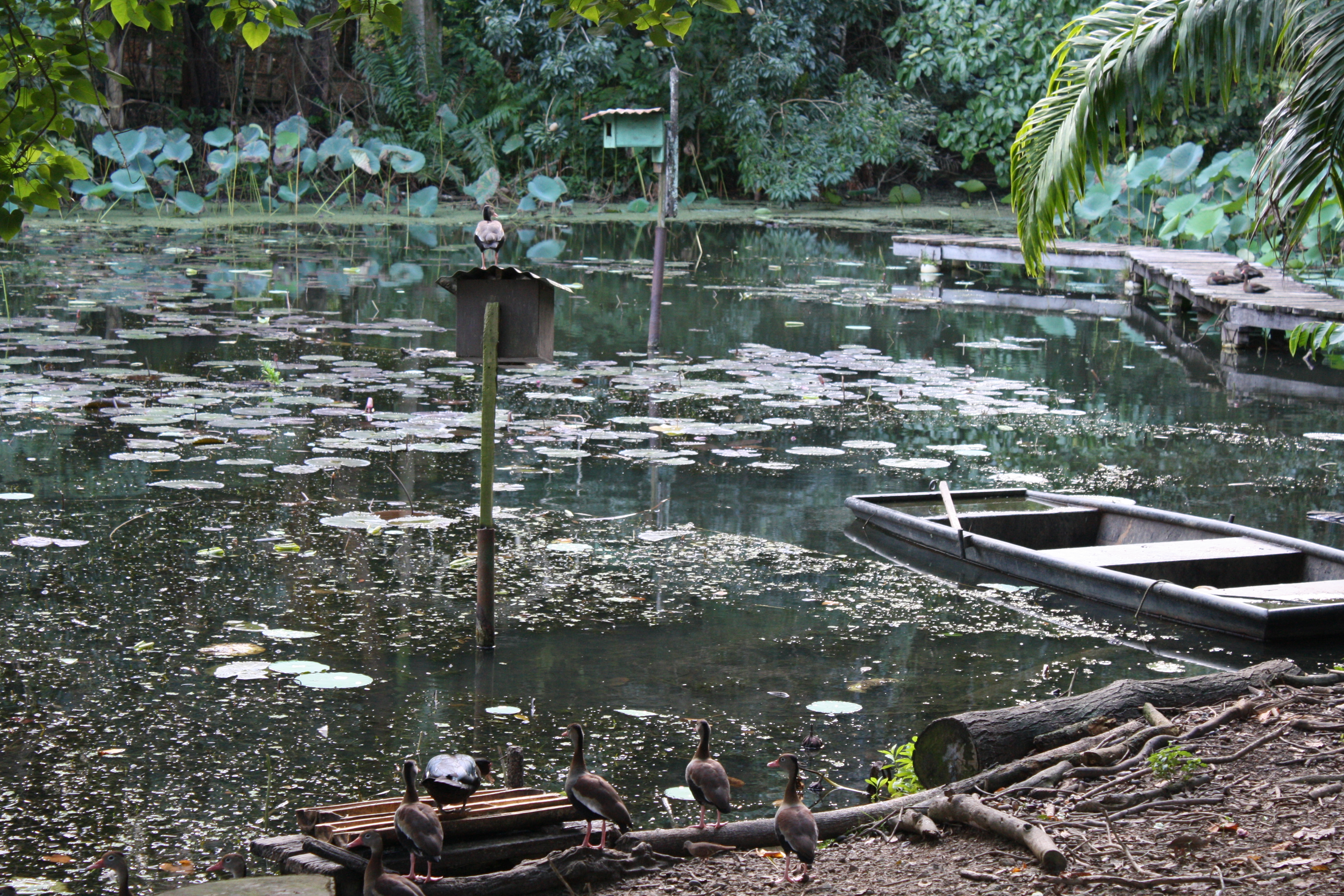
Wild Ducks at Pointe-à-Pierre Wild Fowl Trust

Founded in 1966, the Pointe-à-Pierre Wild Fowl Trust is a not for profit environmental non-government organisation dedicated to environmental education and the conservation of wetlands and waterfowl. Located in Pointe-à-Pierre, Trinidad and Tobago, the trust contains two lakes and about 25 hectares within the Petrotrin oil refinery.

== Mission ==
The Pointe-à-Pierre Wild Fowl Trust's goals are environmental education and public awareness; research, breeding and re-introduction programmes for locally endangered, wetland birds; improved environmental policies through lobbying; and the promotion and implementation of the wise use of natural resources.

== Approach and ideology ==
In their daily environmental education programmes, the Pointe-à-Pierre Wild Fowl Trust teaches about “linkages.” The trust discusses all aspects of the natural environment and their links to human health and well-being, and to social & economic impacts, problems and solutions.

The trust teaches about wetland ecosystems, from forests to coral reefs and their links to people. Thus, the trust has a holistic approach to teaching. The trust also believes that ‘hands on’ experiences in nature are invaluable to awakening a young child's senses and that environmental education should be taken a step further, so, it launched a special programme for pre-schoolers with the concept of ‘touch’, ‘feel’, ‘smell’, and sometimes, ‘taste’. The trust also holds workshops to train school teachers and members of community-based organizations. The trust strongly believes that environmental education must be included in the State's teacher training programmes.

The trust has been involved with environmental education therapy for the physically and mentally challenged, the elderly, victims of substance abuse and battered women.

== Aviculture programme ==
Species	Total released	
Black-bellied whistling duck (Dendrocygna autumnalis)	1260	1968–2014
White-faced whistling duck (Dendrocygna viduata)	62	1988–2008
Fulvous whistling duck (Dendrocygna bicolor)	695	1985–2014
White-cheeked pintail (Anas bahamensis)	142	1985–2002
Wild Muscovy duck (Cairina moschata)	8656	1985–2014 .
Scarlet ibis (Eudocimus ruber)	78	1991–2007
Blue & gold macaw (Ara ararauna)	26	1993–2007

== History ==
The Pointe-à-Pierre Wild Fowl Trust was founded by Richard S.W.Deane who hunted around the refinery and John Cambridge in 1966. The name "Wild Fowl Trust" was derived from the wild birds that settled in the abandoned lakes. In 1979, under the guide of Molly R. Gaskin, the trust initiated an environmental education programme with audio-visuals; the first to be taken into primary, secondary and comprehensive schools and community groups throughout Trinidad, and later on, occasionally in Tobago.

In 1981, Molly R Gaskin became the president of the Pointe-à-Pierre Wild Fowl Trust. In, 1982, the trust started ‘hands on’ field work on site and initiated guided field trips for schools’ ‘scouts’ and ‘guides’ groups to The Asa Wright Nature Centre, Toco and Matura. Through the years, general and specific activities have been provided at the trust. These are adapted to suit students’ and teachers’ needs and the subjects taught included audio-visual shows with interpretation. Fieldwork at the trust includes aquatic sampling, pond, leaf and feather labs, and quadrat and transect sampling.

Between 1992 and 2002, with grant funding from the American Women's Club, British Gas (Trinidad), the Canada Fund, Carib Glassworks, Crown Papers, FIZZ, the Fernandes Trust, NGC, Nestle, Petrotrin, Shell Trinidad Limited, T&T Methanol, and the UK Women's Club, the trust was able to publish: A Collection of Occasional Papers on the Environment, Wonders of Wetlands, A Teacher’s Pack, a Conservation Poster Colouring Book, Energy Flow in a Mangrove Swamp, Sea Turtles and their Habitats, Trinidad and Tobago and the Caribbean, Medicinal Plants of the P-a-P Wildfowl Trust, The Importance of Wetlands, Linkages and Values, Wetlands Information Sheets, and Wetland Birds of Trinidad and Tobago 1 & 2.

The Pointe-à-Pierre Wild Fowl Trust initiates and sustains advocacy, together with other NGOs, to promote linkages and the sustainable utilization of natural assets. This has resulted in the accession to the CITIES convention (1984), the protection of Trinidad and Tobago's national bird, the scarlet ibis, (1986/87), a two-year hunting moratorium (1986/87), the protection of the Port-of-Spain (Mucurapo) wetlands (1989/90), resulting in the formation of the Council of Presidents of the Environment (COPE).

In 1993, the Government of Trinidad and Tobago acceded to the Ramsar Convention, listing the Nariva Wetlands as a site of international importance, a direct result of the trust's active advocacy since 1990. In November 1996, the government removed the illegal rice farmers from the protected area of the Nariva Wetlands and began an environmental impact assessment (EIA), which for the first time offered an economic valuation of that natural asset. Then in 1996, the government ratified the Convention of Biological Diversity (CDB). Another result of the Pointe-à-Pierre Wild Fowl Trust's persistent advocacy.

Molly R. Gaskin (President) and Karilyn Shephard (Vice-President) manage and implement the environmental education, public awareness, research, aviculture, and translocation programmes, together with the day-to-day running of the trust, with the salaried help of professional staff, ground staff, and volunteers. Molly Gaskin once again serves on the Board of the Environmental Management Authority and EMA Trust Fund (EMA, 2002/2008 ), having served in 1995–97, and on the Board of the Green Fund. She also served on the Interim National Physical Planning Commission (INPPC). Karilyn Shephard served on the Board of Governors of the Institute of Marine Affairs (2002–06). Both serve as judges for the EMA, Tidy T&T, and FCB's CARE, schools and communities programmes. The trust has served on the cabinet appointed National Wetlands Committee, contributing to the formation of the National Wetlands Policy (adopted 2001), and the Conservation of Wildlife Committee. The trust served as the environmental NGO on the Trinidad and Tobago delegation to the United Nations Conference of Small Island States (SIDS); Ramsar Conference of Parties, Kushiro, Japan; participated in World Bank/UNDP/UNEP/GEF workshops regionally: INBIO Pilot Biodiversity workshop in Costa Rica: UNECLAC workshops in SIDSPAC follow-up and Poverty Alleviation Ministerial meetings. The trust served on the Board of the Caribbean Conservation Association (CCA, 1994/2001).

== Honours ==
The president, Molly Gaskin was enrolled in the UNEP Global 500 Roll of Honour She played an important role in getting Trinidad and Tobago to accede to the Ramsar Convention, an international treaty for the conservation and sustainable utilisation of wetlands. She received the Hummingbird Medal (gold) in 1987. The trust also received a Hummingbird Medal (gold) in 1994 for its work in environmental education. The Vice president and secretary is Karilyn Shephard.
