= Isaac Benjamin =

Tobagonian cricketer

Cricket information
- Role: All-rounder

Domestic team information
- Years: Team
- 1978-79: Tobago

Career statistics
Competition	First-class
Matches	4
Runs scored	119
Batting average	17.00
100s/50s	0/1
Top score	54
Balls bowled	676
Wickets	10
Bowling average	25.40
5 wickets in innings	0
10 wickets in match	0
Best bowling	3/50
Catches/stumpings	1/0
- Source: Cricinfo, 22 November 2020

Isaac Benjamin is a former cricketer who played first-class cricket for Tobago in 1978–79.

When Tobago was promoted to first-class status for its inclusion in the Texaco Cup competition in 1978-79 alongside the four regional Trinidad sides, Benjamin was appointed captain and played in all four matches. He was Tobago's second-most successful bowler, taking 10 wickets at an average of 25.40, and Tobago's second-most successful batsman, scoring 119 runs at an average of 17.00. Tobago finished winless at the bottom of the competition and played no further first-class cricket, and neither did Benjamin.
