= List of international cricketers from Trinidad and Tobago =

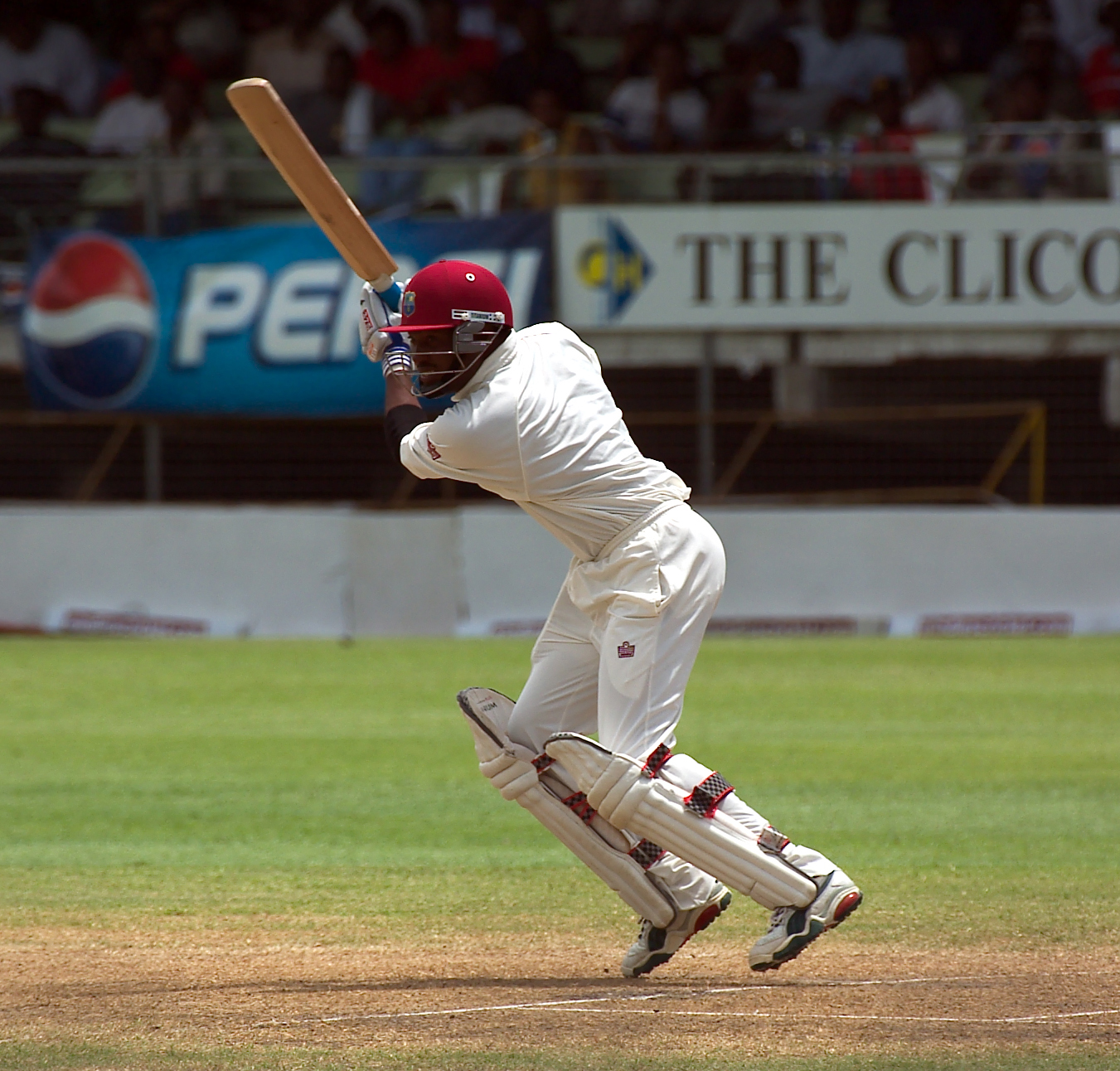
Brian Lara—the leading Trinidadian run scorer in Tests and ODIs

The island nation of Trinidad and Tobago is one of the regions which makes up the West Indies cricket team. It has produced international cricketers in all forms of the game—Tests, One Day Internationals (ODIs) and Twenty20 Internationals (T20Is). Five players from Trinidad and Tobago were included in the West Indies's first ever Test match, against England in 1928. Nelson Betancourt became the first Trinidadian to captain the West Indies when he led the side against England in 1930. Of the nine other Trinidadians to have captained the West Indies, Brian Lara has led the side the most times in Tests with 47 appearances. Lara has captained the West Indies 125 times in ODIs, which is a West Indies record.

Lara has scored the most runs by a Trinidadian, and most runs by a West Indian overall, in Tests and ODIs. With 11,953 runs in Tests, Lara is seventh on the overall record list. Ian Bishop is tied with Shannon Gabriel for the most Test wickets by a Trinidadian with 161. Sonny Ramadhin and Mervyn Dillon are the only other Trinidadians to have taken 100 Test wickets. Dwayne Bravo has taken the most ODI wickets by a Trinidadian with 199. Mervyn Dillon, Ian Bishop and Ravi Rampaul have also taken over 100 ODI wickets. As well it was not until 1999, when Lincoln Roberts played a test match, that a Tobago born player represented the West Indies at international level.

== Key ==
- Apps denotes the number of appearances the player has made.
- Runs denotes the number of runs scored by the player.
- Wkts denotes the number of wickets taken by the player.

West Indies captains

Statistics correct as of: October 2022

| Name | International career | Apps | Runs | Wkts | Apps | Runs | Wkts | Apps | Runs | Wkts | References |
| Name | International career | Tests | | | ODIs | | | T20Is | | | References |
|---|---|---|---|---|---|---|---|---|---|---|---|
| Learie Constantine | 1928–1939 | 18 | 635 | 58 | – | – | – | – | – | – | |
| Herman Griffith | 1928–1933 | 13 | 91 | 44 | – | – | – | – | – | – | |
| Clifford Roach | 1928–1935 | 16 | 952 | 2 | – | – | – | – | – | – | |
| Joe Small | 1928–1930 | 3 | 79 | 3 | – | – | – | – | – | – | |
| Wilton St Hill | 1928–1930 | 3 | 117 | 0 | – | – | – | – | – | – | |
| Errol Hunte | 1930 | 3 | 166 | 0 | – | – | – | – | – | – | |
| Edwin St Hill | 1930 | 2 | 18 | 3 | – | – | – | – | – | – | |
| Puss Achong | 1930–1935 | 6 | 81 | 8 | – | – | – | – | – | – | |
| Nelson Betancourt | 1930 | 1 | 52 | 0 | – | – | – | – | – | – | |
| Mervyn Grell | 1930 | 1 | 34 | 0 | – | – | – | – | – | – | |
| Jackie Grant | 1930–1935 | 12 | 413 | 0 | – | – | – | – | – | – | |
| Cyril Merry | 1933 | 2 | 34 | 0 | – | – | – | – | – | – | |
| Ben Sealey | 1933 | 1 | 41 | 1 | – | – | – | – | – | – | |
| Rolph Grant | 1935–1939 | 7 | 220 | 11 | – | – | – | – | – | – | |
| Jeffrey Stollmeyer | 1939–1955 | 32 | 2,159 | 13 | – | – | – | – | – | – | |
| Gerry Gomez | 1939–1954 | 29 | 1,243 | 58 | – | – | – | – | – | – | |
| Tyrell Johnson | 1939 | 1 | 9 | 3 | – | – | – | – | – | – | |
| Vic Stollmeyer | 1939 | 1 | 96 | 0 | – | – | – | – | – | – | |
| Wilf Ferguson | 1948–1954 | 8 | 200 | 34 | – | – | – | – | – | – | |
| Prior Jones | 1948–1951 | 9 | 47 | 25 | – | – | – | – | – | – | |
| Andy Ganteaume | 1948 | 1 | 112 | 0 | – | – | – | – | – | – | |
| Lance Pierre | 1948 | 1 | 0 | 0 | – | – | – | – | – | – | |
| Sonny Ramadhin | 1950–1961 | 43 | 361 | 158 | – | – | – | – | – | – | |
| Sammy Guillen^{[a]} | 1951–1956 | 8 | 202 | 0 | – | – | – | – | – | – | |
| Bunny Butler | 1955 | 1 | 16 | 2 | – | – | – | – | – | – | |
| Hammond Furlonge | 1955–1956 | 3 | 99 | 0 | – | – | – | – | – | – | |
| Nyron Asgarali | 1957 | 2 | 62 | 0 | – | – | – | – | – | – | |
| Jaswick Taylor | 1958–1959 | 3 | 4 | 10 | – | – | – | – | – | – | |
| Charran Singh | 1960 | 2 | 11 | 5 | – | – | – | – | – | – | |
| Willie Rodriguez | 1962–1968 | 5 | 96 | 7 | – | – | – | – | – | – | |
| Joey Carew | 1963–1972 | 19 | 1,127 | 8 | – | – | – | – | – | – | |
| Deryck Murray | 1963–1980 | 62 | 1,993 | 0 | 26 | 294 | 0 | – | – | – | |
| Bryan Davis | 1965 | 4 | 245 | 0 | – | – | – | – | – | – | |
| Charlie Davis | 1968–1973 | 15 | 1,301 | 2 | – | – | – | – | – | – | |
| Jack Noreiga | 1971 | 4 | 11 | 17 | – | – | – | – | – | – | |
| Inshan Ali | 1971–1977 | 12 | 172 | 34 | – | – | – | – | – | – | |
| Raphick Jumadeen | 1972–1979 | 12 | 84 | 29 | – | – | – | – | – | – | |
| Bernard Julien | 1973–1977 | 24 | 866 | 50 | 12 | 86 | 18 | – | – | – | |
| Imtiaz Ali | 1976 | 1 | 1 | 2 | – | – | – | – | – | – | |
| Larry Gomes | 1976–1987 | 60 | 3,171 | 15 | 83 | 1,415 | 41 | – | – | – | |
| Rangy Nanan | 1980 | 1 | 16 | 4 | – | – | – | – | – | – | |
| Gus Logie | 1981–1993 | 52 | 2,470 | 0 | 158 | 2,809 | 0 | – | – | – | |
| Richard Gabriel | 1984 | – | – | – | 11 | 167 | 0 | – | – | – | |
| Tony Gray | 1985–1991 | 5 | 48 | 22 | 25 | 51 | 44 | – | – | – | |
| Phil Simmons | 1987–1999 | 26 | 1,002 | 4 | 143 | 3,675 | 83 | – | – | – | |
| David Williams | 1988–1998 | 11 | 242 | 0 | 36 | 147 | 0 | – | – | – | |
| Ian Bishop | 1988–1998 | 43 | 632 | 161 | 84 | 405 | 118 | – | – | – | |
| Brian Lara^{[b]} | 1990–2007 | 131 | 11,953 | 0 | 299 | 10,405 | 4 | – | – | – | |
| Roland Holder | 1993–1997 | 11 | 380 | 0 | 37 | 599 | 0 | – | – | – | |
| Rajindra Dhanraj | 1994–1996 | 4 | 17 | 8 | 6 | 8 | 10 | – | – | – | |
| Mervyn Dillon | 1997–2005 | 38 | 549 | 131 | 108 | 227 | 130 | – | – | – | |
| Dinanath Ramnarine | 1998–2002 | 12 | 106 | 45 | 4 | 5 | 3 | – | – | – | |
| Daren Ganga | 1998–2008 | 48 | 2,160 | 1 | 35 | 843 | 0 | 1 | 26 | 0 | |
| Suruj Ragoonath | 1999 | 2 | 13 | 0 | – | – | – | – | – | – | |
| Lincoln Roberts | 1999 | 1 | 0 | 0 | – | – | – | – | – | – | |
| Marlon Black | 2000–2002 | 6 | 21 | 12 | 5 | 4 | 0 | – | – | – | |
| Darryl Brown | 2001–2002 | – | – | – | 3 | 10 | 5 | – | – | – | |
| Ravi Rampaul | 2003– | 18 | 335 | 49 | 92 | 362 | 117 | 27 | 15 | 31 | |
| Dave Mohammed | 2004–2008 | 5 | 225 | 13 | 7 | 0 | 10 | – | – | – | |
| Dwayne Bravo | 2004–2021 | 40 | 2,200 | 86 | 164 | 2,968 | 199 | 91 | 1255 | 78 | |
| Denesh Ramdin | 2005–2019 | 74 | 2,898 | 0 | 139 | 2,200 | 0 | 71 | 636 | 0 | |
| Lendl Simmons | 2006–2021 | 8 | 278 | 1 | 68 | 1958 | 1 | 68 | 1527 | 6 | |
| Rayad Emrit | 2007–2018 | – | – | – | 2 | 13 | 0 | 4 | 17 | 4 | |
| Kieron Pollard | 2007–2022 | – | – | – | 123 | 2,706 | 55 | 101 | 1569 | 42 | |
| Amit Jaggernauth | 2008 | 1 | 0 | 1 | – | – | – | – | – | – | |
| Darren Bravo | 2009– | 56 | 3,538 | 0 | 122 | 3,109 | 0 | 26 | 405 | 0 | |
| Ryan Austin | 2009 | 2 | 39 | 3 | – | – | – | – | – | – | |
| Adrian Barath | 2009–2012 | 15 | 657 | 0 | 14 | 394 | 0 | 2 | 23 | 0 | |
| Sunil Narine | 2011– | 6 | 40 | 21 | 65 | 363 | 92 | 51 | 155 | 52 | |
| Jason Mohammed | 2011– | – | – | – | 36 | 630 | 8 | 9 | 90 | 0 | |
| Shannon Gabriel | 2012– | 56 | 221 | 161 | 25 | 24 | 33 | 2 | – | 3 | |
| Evin Lewis | 2016– | – | – | – | 57 | 1847 | – | 50 | 1423 | – | |
| Nicholas Pooran | 2016– | – | – | – | 52 | 1555 | 006 | 69 | 1402 | – | |
| Khary Pierre | 2019– | – | – | – | 3 | 39 | 001 | 10 | 17 | 7 | |
| Joshua Da Silva | 2020– | 16 | 670 | – | 2 | 14 | – | – | – | – | |
| Akeal Hosein | 2021– | – | – | – | 29 | 234 | 44 | 29 | 108 | 23 | |
| Jayden Seales | 2021– | 9 | 36 | 36 | 7 | 16 | 4 | – | – | – | |

== Notes ==
- ^{a} Guillen played 3 Tests for New Zealand.
- ^{b} Lara played 4 ODIs and 1 Test for the ICC World XI.

== See also ==
- List of West Indies Test cricketers
- List of West Indies ODI cricketers
- List of West Indies Twenty20 International cricketers
