= Dispersit =

Oil dispersant

Dispersit SPC 1000 or Dispersit is a dispersant used for oil spills, produced by U.S. Polychemical Corporation.

== Composition ==
It combines a predominantly oil-soluble surfactant (such as polyethylene glycol mono-oleate) with a predominantly water-soluble surfactant (such as cocoamide) and a co-solvent for coupling a mixture of the predominantly oil-soluble surfactant and the oil.

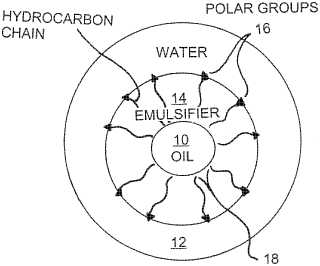
Schematic illustration of an oil droplet being emulsified by Dispersit

== Alternatives ==
Alternative dispersants which are approved by the EPA are listed on the National Contingency Plan Product Schedule and rated for their toxicity and effectiveness.

== Deployments ==
=== 2010 Gulf of Mexico oil spill ===
Dispersit is unique among U.S. Environmental Protection Agency-rated dispersants in being the only one rated as 100% effective against South Louisiana crude oil, and it is among the least toxic, according to EPA tests. By comparison, Corexit, the oil dispersant used in the Deepwater Horizon oil spill, is rated at 54.7% effective against South Louisiana crude oil and three times as lethal to silverfish and more than twice as lethal to shrimp.

On May 20, US Polychemical Corporation was reported to have received an order from BP for Dispersit SPC 1000. US Polychemical reportedly stated it was able to produce 20,000 US gallons (76,000 L) a day in the first few days and increasing up to 60,000 US gallons (230,000 L) a day thereafter.

== See also ==
- Corexit
- Sea Brat 4
