= Molly Gaskin =

Trinidad and Tobago environmentalist

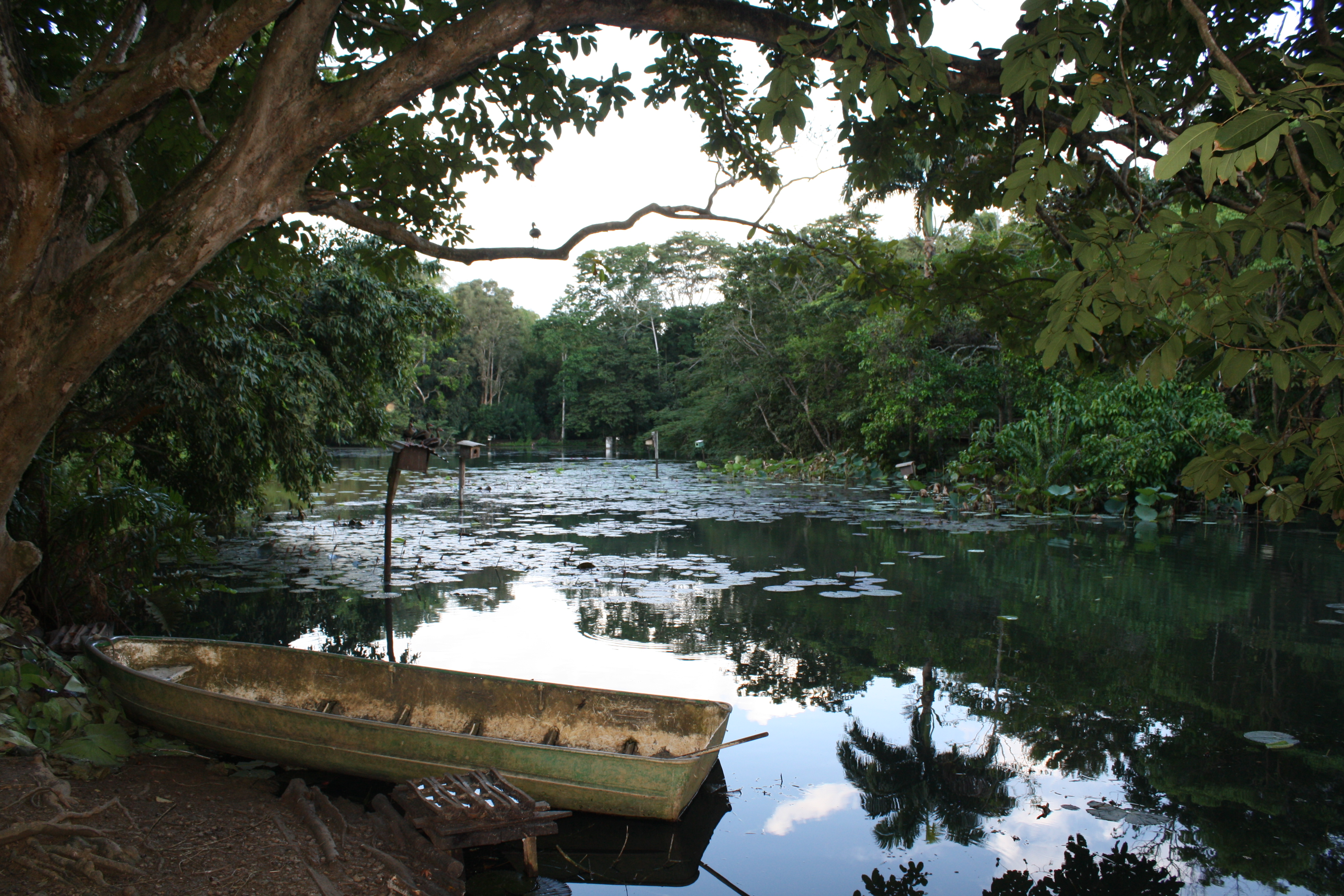
- her Pointe-à-Pierre Wild Fowl Trust
- Born: 1941 (age 84–85)
- Education: University of wales
- Occupations: Environmentalist, educator and wetland conservationist
- Employer: Pointe-à-Pierre Wild Fowl Trust

Molly R. Gaskin (born 1941) is an environmentalist from Trinidad and Tobago, who is a co-founder, in 1966, and, as of 2024, President of Pointe-à-Pierre Wild Fowl Trust. She pioneered environmental education at the Trust, focussing on wetland habitat and herbal medicine.

Educated at the University of Wales, in 1978 she took on management of the organisation. In 1983 she introduced turtle patrols to protect the reptiles laying their eggs at Matura Beach. She also led a successful scarlet ibis breeding programme at the trust, hatching its first chick in 1991. In 1993 she enabled the government of Trinidad and Tobago to join the Ramsar Convention.

== Awards and recognition ==
- Hummingbird Gold Medal, a national award for Environmental Education (1987)
- United Nations Environment Programme “Global 500” Roll of Honor (1994)
- 25 “Exceptional women leaders from around the world for outstanding effort and dedication to the environment”, by The United Nations Environment Programme (UNEP)
- Featured in the book 90 Most Prominent Women in Trinidad and Tobago
