= Trinidad Petroleum Holdings =

Oil company in Trinidad and Tobago

Trinidad Petroleum Holdings Limited
- Type: State-owned enterprise
- Industry: Oil and gas industry
- Predecessor: Petrotrin
- Founded: 5 October 2018
- Headquarters: Port of Spain, Trinidad, Trinidad and Tobago
- Revenue: ▼TT$4.739 billion
- Operating income: ▼TT$1.257 billion
- Net income: ▼TT$881.899 million
- Total assets: ▼TT$10.196
- Total equity: ▲TT$2.013
- Owner: Government of Trinidad and Tobago
- Subsidiaries: Heritage Petroleum Company Ltd. Guaracara Refining Company Ltd. Paria Fuel Trading Company
- Website: trinidadpetroleum.co.tt

Trinidad Petroleum Holdings is a state-owned oil company in Trinidad and Tobago. Its principal activities are the exploration, development, and production of hydrocarbons, operations it conducts through its primary subsidiary, Heritage Petroleum Company Ltd. Trinidad Petroleum Holdings also owns Guaracara Refining Company Ltd, which operates the nation's only petroleum refinery. It also owns the Paria Fuel Trading Company subsidiary, which imports refined petroleum products, and stores and distributes them domestically.

== Corporate history ==
=== Creation of TPHL ===
The history of the Trinidad and Tobago national oil company can be traced to 1969, when the government established the National Petroleum Company. The company, the Trinidad-Tesoro Petroleum Company Ltd, was a partner in a joint venture with Tesoro Corporation, and was formed to acquire the assets of British Petroleum as it exited operations in the Caribbean. (The government bought out Tesoro in 1985, and changed the name of the company to Trinidad and Tobago Petroleum Company Ltd [Trintopec].) In 1974, the government bought the local assets of Shell Trinidad Ltd, and formed a new national oil company, the Trinidad and Tobago Oil Company Ltd (Trintoc) to hold and operate them. The government formed a third national oil company, Trintomar Ltd, in 1988. A joint venture of Trintopec, Trintoc, and the government's National Gas Company, it took over the assets of the South East Coast Consortium, a joint venture of foreign multinational oil companies producing oil off Trinidad's southeast coast.

In 1994, the government merged Trintopec and Trintoc into a new company, Petrotrin. Trinmar merged into Petrotrin in 2000. Petrotrin faced conflicting goals. It had to convince foreign multinational oil companies to partner with it in exploration, development, and production activities. These companies refined the hydrocarbons and sold them back to Petrotrin at a mark-up so Petrotrin could meet domestic gasoline, diesel fuel, natural gas, and other needs. At the same time, Petrotrin was responsible for managing the country's sole petroleum refinery, whose existence undercut the profits foreign oil companies might expect from selling refined products back to Trinidad and Tobago. Petrotrin was unable to balance these conflicting goals.

By 2017, Petrotrin was in financial trouble. It had lost TT$8 billion since 2012, was TT$12 billion in debt, and owed the government TT$3 billion. It had so mismanaged its own infrastructure that it needed TT$25 billion to make repairs and upgrades. In mid 2018, the government announced that Petrotrin would be dissolved. Trinidad Petroleum Holdings Limited (TPHL) was incorporated on 5 October 2018, with the government of Trinidad and Tobago the sole shareholder. On 1 December 2018 Petrotrin was dissolved. Its petroleum exploration, development, and production assets and responsibilities were distributed to a new corporation, Heritage Petroleum. Ownership of its refinery (shuttered since August 2018) was transferred to a new company, Guaracara Refining. The assets and responsibilities of its fuel import and distribution business were given to a third new firm, Paria Fuel Trading Company. A fourth corporation, Legacy Petrotrin, was responsible for settling Petrotrin's debts and handling other "legacy" issues.

=== TPHL corporate history ===
Mike Wylie was named the chief executive officer of TPHL. All of Petrotrin's workers were laid off, and TPHL rehired about 40 percent of them. The government loaned TPHL TT$1.2 billion to help cover the cost of restructuring and to meet short-term debt. TPHL refocused its corporate goals on petroleum exploration, development, and production, and began making monthly crude oil exports again, with production of 38,000 barrels of oil per day (bpd) and 110,000,000 cubic feet (3,100,000 m^{3}) of natural gas per day.

Wylie took a medical leave of absence in early August 2019 to seek treatment for colon cancer. On August 21, Wylie was terminated as CEO by the government, which explained that TPHL could not afford to have its CEO absent for eight months. Additionally, the government dismissed several individuals from the board of directors of TPHL and its subsidiaries, including chairman Wilfred Espinet (the former chairman of Petrotrin). Attorney Michael A.A. Quamina, a close associate of Prime Minister Keith Rowley, was appointed the new TPHL board chairman. He also assumed the chair of the board of directors of Heritage Petroleum. Newman George, the retiring chair of the Trinidad & Tobago Housing Development Corporation (HDC) (an agency of the Ministry of Housing & Urban Development), was appointed chairman of the board of directors of Paria Fuel Trading Company and Guaracara Refining.

In September 2019, TPHL announced that it would be selling the Pointe-a-Pierre refinery, the nation's only petroleum refinery, to Patriotic Energies and Technologies, a company owned by the Oilfields Workers' Trade Union. The sale was worth TT$500 million. The sale was revoked in February 2021 after Colm Imbert, Minister of Finance, said that Patriotic Energies lacked the financial ability to finalize the sale. Imbert pointed out that the government was being asked to loan Patriotic the cost of the sale plus all interest, which he characterized as "giving away" the refinery.

S&P Global Ratings downgraded TPHL's bond rating from BB to B+ in February 2022 after TPHL delayed issuing its 2019 audited consolidated financial statement. TPHL said the delays were caused by ongoing issues with Petrotrin's restructuring and the resolution of debt and sale of assets.

== Paria Fuel Trading Company diving disaster ==
The Caribbean diving disaster was an incident in February 2022 in which a group of five divers working for the Paria Fuel Trading Company were sucked into a pipeline from a hyperbaric chamber. One diver managed to crawl to safety, but the other four were left to die, with no attempt being made to rescue them.

An investigation by the government of Trinidad and Tobago concluded that the deaths of the divers were due to "gross [...] and consequently criminal" negligence and made recommendations that charges be laid for corporate manslaughter.
