= Ryan Austin =

Ryan Austin may refer to:

- Ryan Austin (cricketer) (born 1981), Trinidadian cricketer
- Ryan Austin (footballer) (born 1984), English footballer and manager
