= Guaracara River =

River in Trinidad and Tobago

Coordinates: 10°18′N 61°28′W

The Guaracara River, located in south Trinidad, runs westward approximately 30 km long, out of the Central Range and drains into the Gulf of Paria. It forms the boundary between the city of San Fernando (to the south) and the Couva-Tabaquite-Talparo Regional Corporation. In local terms it separates Marabella (the northernmost portion of the city) from Pointe-à-Pierre.

The river is heavily polluted, both by non-point agricultural and residential run-off from Marabella and the town of Gasparillo, and from industrial waste (primarily oily run-off) from the oil refinery at Pointe-a-Pierre owned by Petrotrin (the state-owned oil company).

== History ==
The name Guaracara is of Lokono origin.

In 1687 Capuchin monks used the Guaracara River to enter the interior of the island on their way to establish a mission at Savana Grande. In 1856 a tram line was established between the Union Embarcadere on the south bank of the river, and Garth Estate. Between 1882 and 1884 it was converted by the Trinidad Government Railway into a rail line connecting Guaracara with Princes Town.
