= Larry Gomes =

West Indian cricketer (born 1953)

Personal information
- Full name: Hilary Angelo Gomes
- Born: 13 July 1953 (age 73); Arima, Trinidad and Tobago
- Batting: Left-handed
- Bowling: Right-arm off break Right-arm medium pace
- Relatives: Sheldon Gomes (brother)

International information
- National side: West Indies
- Test debut (cap 157): 3 June 1976 v England
- Last Test: 12 March 1987 v New Zealand
- ODI debut (cap 28): 12 April 1978 v Australia
- Last ODI: 6 February 1987 v Australia

Domestic team information
- Years: Team
- 1971–1988: Trinidad and Tobago
- 1973–1976: Middlesex

Career statistics
Competition	Tests	ODIs	FC	LA
Matches	60	83	231	157
Runs scored	3,171	1,415	12,982	3,115
Batting average	39.63	28.87	40.56	28.84
100s/50s	9/13	1/6	32/63	2/13
Top score	143	101	200*	103*
Balls bowled	2,401	1,345	9,804	3,548
Wickets	15	41	107	84
Bowling average	62.00	25.48	39.23	28.48
5 wickets in innings	0	0	0	0
10 wickets in match	0	0	0	0
Best bowling	2/20	4/31	4/22	4/31
Catches/stumpings	18/–	14/–	77/–	34/–
Medal record
Men's Cricket
Representing West Indies
ICC Cricket World Cup
Winner	1979 England
Runner-up	1983 England and Wales
- Source: Cricket Archive, 20 January 2022

Hilary Angelo Gomes (born 13 July 1953) is a Trinidad and Tobago and West Indian former cricketer of Portuguese descent. He was a member of the squad which won the 1979 Cricket World Cup and finished as runners-up at the 1983 Cricket World Cup.

== Cricket career ==
Gomes toured England with the West Indian youth team in 1970 and made his first-class debut as a left-handed batsman for Trinidad and Tobago against New Zealand in 1971–72. He played county cricket for Middlesex between 1973 and 1976.

Gomes was a successful batsman for the West Indies, usually playing at number 3. He was part of the West Indies team which beat England 5–0 in 1984, the only time a touring side has won in England by such a margin. Gomes was named man of the match in both the First and Third Tests, in which he scored 143 and 104 respectively.

Gomes scored six centuries against Australia, most notably one on a bouncy Perth strip in 1984 that set up an innings victory. However, he is also remembered in Australia as the batsman whose wicket Dennis Lillee took during the Boxing Day Test in Melbourne in 1981 to break Lance Gibbs's world record for most Test wickets.

== Coaching career ==
At the 1997 ICC Trophy in Malaysia, Gomes served as the head coach of the Canadian team.

== Honours ==
Gomes was named Wisden Cricketer of the Year in 1985. The Larry Gomes Stadium in Malabar, Arima is named after him.

== Personal life ==
Gomes lives, with his wife Ann Maire, in Scarborough, Ontario, Canada.

Preceded by Harold Gibson	Nelson Cricket Club; Professional; 1977–1978	Succeeded by Stephen Howard
