= Central Trinidad cricket team =

The Central Trinidad cricket team played first-class cricket from 1971 to 1979, competing in the Beaumont Cup and its successor competition the Texaco Cup.

When the Beaumont Cup, which had been contested by South Trinidad and North Trinidad since 1925–26, was expanded in 1970–71, Central Trinidad and East Trinidad were added to make up a four-team first-class competition, which was renamed the Texaco Cup in 1971–72. In 1978–79 Tobago joined the competition. That was the final season in which it had first-class status.

Central Trinidad did not win a match until their third season, 1973–74, when they beat East Trinidad by an innings, Inshan Ali taking 10 for 67 (6 for 48 and 4 for 19), Central Trinidad's best match figures. They went on to beat North Trinidad in the final and take the title. In the first innings Harry Ramoutar took 7 for 43, Central Trinidad's best innings figures. They also won the title in 1978–79, when by defeating East Trinidad by 103 runs in their last first-class match they became the only side to defeat a team other than Tobago.

Central Trinidad played 19 first-class matches, winning six, losing four and drawing nine. Only one batsman scored a century: Theodore Cuffy, 118 against North Trinidad in 1975–76.

Central Trinidad played 12 home matches, all at Gilbert Park in California.
