= Tobago cricket team =

The Tobago cricket team has represented Tobago in various matches since 1958. In the 1978–79 season it played first-class cricket in the Texaco Cup.

Tobago played their first match in 1957–58, a one-day match against the touring Pakistanis. Over the next 15 years several international teams played Tobago. All the matches took place at the Shaw Park ground in Scarborough. In 1964–65, in another one-day match, Tobago dismissed the touring Australians for 142 and in response made 145 after being 84 for 8.

For the 1978–79 season the first-class Texaco Cup was expanded to include Tobago as well as the four regional Trinidad sides that had competed in 1977–78. None of the Tobago players had played first-class cricket before. Tobago drew their first match, then lost their next three, two of them by an innings. They finished at the bottom of the table. All four matches were played on the Trinidad mainland. The leading wicket-taker was Alston Daniel, with 11 wickets at an average of 29.00; he later played for Trinidad and Tobago. The captain was Isaac Benjamin.

The Texaco Cup lost its first-class status after 1978–79. Tobago were scheduled to compete in 1979–80 but did not play any of their matches.
