= Petrotrin =

State-owned oil company in Trinidad and Tobago

Petroleum Company of Trinidad and Tobago
- Type: Public
- Traded as: Petrotrin
- Industry: Oil and gas industry
- Predecessor: Trintoc, Trintopec, Trinmar
- Founded: January 1993
- Defunct: 30 November 2018
- Successor: Trinidad Petroleum Holdings Limited
- Headquarters: Pointe-à-Pierre, Trinidad and Tobago
- Number of locations: 3 - Pointe-à-Pierre, Point Fortin & Santa Flora
- Key people: Wilfred Espinet (Chairman)
- Total assets: TT$40.5 billion
- Owner: Government of Trinidad and Tobago
- Number of employees: ~5,500
- Website: www.petrotrin.com

Petroleum Company of Trinidad and Tobago Limited (trading as Petrotrin) was a state-owned oil company in Trinidad and Tobago. Its principal activities were the exploration, development and production of hydrocarbons in addition to the manufacturing and marketing of petroleum products.

As a state enterprise, Petrotrin was under the direct control of the Minister of Finance acting as the Corporation Sole, and the Ministry of Energy as the line ministry that provides specialized technical analyses and statutory approvals for the company's operations.

== History ==
The company was established in 1993 by the merger of Trintopec and Trintoc, two state-owned oil companies. A third company, Trinmar Ltd was merged into the company in 2000. Trintoc was formed from the assets of Shell Trinidad Ltd in 1974 and Texaco in 1985. Trintopec was formed in 1985 when the government purchased the interests of Trinidad Tesoro, a joint venture between the government and Tesoro Oil Company, which was created to purchase the assets of British Petroleum (BP) in 1969. Trinmar was formed when the government purchased the offshore exploration assets of Trinidad Northern Areas Limited (TNA) which was formed by the then "Big Three": British Petroleum, Texaco and Shell.

These companies were formed from a suite of earlier companies including Trinidad Oilfields Limited (TOL), United British Oilfields of Trinidad (UBOT), Trinidad Leaseholds Limited (TLL), Trinidad Petroleum Development Co (TPD), Apex Trinidad Oilfields (APEX/ATO) and Kern Trinidad Oilfields (KTO), which had themselves been formed to first able commercialize oil finds in Trinidad in the early twentieth century.

Petrotrin operated in land and marine acreage across southern Trinidad. In some instances, the company engaged in joint ventures, lease operator-ships, farm-outs and incremental production services contracts to support its exploration and production activities. In 2004, Petrotrin was granted an automatic stake in all exploration and production arrangements with foreign companies in Trinidad and Tobago.

In 2018, 90% of Petrotrin's sales to the local market were fuel – 46% from gasoline, 37% from diesel, 11% from jet fuel and 5% from liquefied petroleum gas (LPG or cooking gas). Petrotrin exported to the Caricom market with the main countries being Jamaica, Barbados and Guyana.

== Refining ==
In the early 1900s, there were several small refineries operating in Trinidad, including plants in Santa Flora (TPD 1930 – ?) and Brighton (UBOT 1911–1978). These were all closed over time as they became non-viable either because of aging technology or supply and cost challenges. The Point Fortin Refinery built in 1912 that once refined Venezuelan crude was the last to be shut down in 1994 due to cost challenges after the economic recession of the 1980s to make way for Atlantic LNG as Trinidad and Tobago shifted its emphasis from oil to natural gas.

Petrotrin operated Trinidad and Tobago's single petroleum refinery, located at Pointe-à-Pierre, just north of the city of San Fernando, popularly known as the Pointe-a-Pierre Refinery. The refinery produced liquid petroleum gases, unleaded motor gasoline, avjet/kerosene, diesel/heating oil, fuel oil and aviation gasoline among other products. It has driven the country's economy and placed the country in the hydrocarbon sector.

In 1913, former sugar estates in the area was purchased for plans to build a refinery by Trinidad Leaseholds Ltd, a British subsidiary of Central Mining Company headquartered in the United Kingdom. In 1917, the refinery was built and began production at 75,000 barrels of oil per day (bpd). Its first upgrade occurred in 1928 with the construction of the No 3 and 4 Topping plants. During World War II the refinery was identified as an asset to be "protected at all cost" as a major supplier of aircraft fuel for the Allied forces. By 1940, the refinery went through another expansion, a top secret project known as Project 1234 and by May 1942, the first Catalytic Cracking Unit came on stream where refining capacity in Trinidad and Tobago was recorded at 28.5 million barrels per year. At the end of World War II, the refinery was recognized as the largest in the British empire.

In 1956, Trinidad Leaseholds Ltd was acquired by Texaco where by April 1960, the No 8 Topping Unit came on stream along with a lubricating oil plant, canning plant and a paraffins plant with production increasing and peaking to 360,000 barrels per day by 1970. Following the unrest of the 1970 Black Power Revolution, throughput was down to 183,000 barrels per day yet the refinery continued to be viable. By late 1984, Texaco assets including the refinery was acquired by the State and placed under the state company Trintoc, which itself was merged to form Petrotrin in 1993. By 1997, upgrades to infrastructure, instrumentation, and environmental systems were completed. This was done to improve product quality by reducing the sulfur content and increasing octane moving production from 90,000 to 160,000 barrels per day. More upgrades were done on the plants as recent as 2011. By being the only refinery in operation in the Caribbean, Trinidad & Tobago became the supplier of refined petroleum products to the rest of the region.

Petrotrin produced 48,047 barrels per day (7,638.9 m^{3}/d) and had proven reserves totaling 439,585 million barrels (6.98884×10^{10} m^{3}).

The refinery had a capacity of 190 thousand barrels per day (30,000 m^{3}/d) and it was the only refinery in the world that operated alongside a wildlife park.

== Closure ==
Petrotrin became the embodiment of poor corporate governance, expressed in bad policy decisions, wastage, corruption and nepotism across governments. The power of the Oilfields Workers' Trade Union over the company due to consolidation of past state oil companies made it even more difficult for management to institute changes. On 28 August 2018, it was announced by Prime Minister Dr Keith Rowley that Petrotrin would have to be shut down (although earlier stating in his political campaign they would not shut down the state-owned company) because of the government and company's inability to generate a profit during a period of low oil prices, where TT$8 billion was lost over five years. Also cited by the government was lack of competitiveness, declining production, TT$12 billion in debt, and the loss of foreign exchange due to the importation of oil to be used together with locally produced oil to keep the refinery in operation. According to the government, a cash injection of TT$25 billion would be required to refresh its infrastructure and repay its debt. On 30 November 2018, Petrotrin was shut down with the country's largest refinery officially closed after 101 years in operation. Approximately 5,500 permanent and temporary/casual employees lost their jobs.

Petrotrin broke into four new companies that became effective from 1 December 2018:

- Trinidad Petroleum Holdings Limited – Legacy matters such as settling outstanding financial debts by Petrotrin and the parent company of the following three companies:
- Heritage Petroleum Company Limited – Exploration, development, production and marketing of crude oil.
- Paria Fuel Trading Company – Trading and marketing of imported fuel products.
- Guaracara Refining Company – Holding company for the Pointe-à-Pierre refinery and related assets to be offered for sale.

The refinery flame was a national landmark, with many in surrounding communities such as Pointe-à-Pierre, Marabella, Claxton Bay and Gasparillo expressing hopes for the refinery to be purchased and restarted by a private enterprise.
