= East Trinidad cricket team =

The East Trinidad cricket team played first-class cricket from 1971 to 1979, competing in the Beaumont Cup and its successor competition the Texaco Cup.

When the Beaumont Cup, which had been contested by South Trinidad and North Trinidad since 1925–26, was expanded in 1970–71, East Trinidad and Central Trinidad were added to make up a four-team first-class competition, which was renamed the Texaco Cup in 1971–72. In 1978–79 Tobago joined the competition in its final season of first-class status.

East Trinidad were successful immediately, winning four of their first five matches and taking the title in 1971–72 and 1976–77. In all they played 22 matches, with six wins, seven losses and nine draws.

Their highest score was 128 by Alvin Corneal in their victorious 1971–72 final against South Trinidad, when he scored 50 out of a team total of 140, then 128 out of a total of 209, while Imtiaz Ali took 10 for 69 in the match (7 for 27 and 3 for 42), East Trinidad's best match figures. In the first match of the next season Ali took 8 for 38 (10 for 92 in the match), East Trinidad's best innings figures, against Central Trinidad.

East Trinidad played five home matches, three of them at Sir Frank Worrell Memorial Ground, Saint Augustine and two at Princess Royal Park, Arima.
