= South Trinidad cricket team =

The South Trinidad cricket team played first-class cricket from 1959 to 1979, competing in the Beaumont Cup and its successor competition the Texaco Cup.

South Trinidad played North Trinidad annually for the Beaumont Cup from 1925–26 to 1957–58, when the matches were not considered first-class, and from 1958–59 to 1969–70, when they had first-class status. Of these 12 first-class matches, North Trinidad won five and the rest were drawn. South Trinidad's highest score in this period was by Leo John, who scored 120 out of a team total of 215 in 1967–68, and the best bowling figures were 5 for 37 by Kerry Maloney in 1961–62.

Beginning in 1970–71, East Trinidad and Central Trinidad made up a four-team first-class competition, which was renamed the Texaco Cup in 1971–72. In 1978–79 Tobago joined the competition. That was the final season in which it had first-class status. South Trinidad won the title in 1972–73 and 1975–76. In this period South Trinidad played 20 matches, winning five, losing four, and drawing the other 11. Their highest score was 102, scored by both William McLeod against Central Trinidad in 1977–78 and Kenrick Bainey against Tobago in 1978–79, in South Trinidad's last first-class match. The best innings bowling figures were 7 for 37 (10 for 79 in the match) by Arnold Oliver in the victory over East Trinidad in the deciding match of the 1975–76 competition, while the best match bowling figures were 11 for 49 (5 for 19 and 6 for 30) by Raphick Jumadeen against Central Trinidad in the first match of that season; Oliver had match figures of 7 for 40 in the same match.

In all, South Trinidad played 32 first-class matches, with five wins, nine losses and 18 draws.

South Trinidad played most of their home matches at Guaracara Park in Pointe-à-Pierre, some at Dubisson Park in Sainte Madeleine, just outside San Fernando, and one at the Brighton Cricket Club Ground in La Brea.
