= Trinidad and Tobago national cricket team =

Cricket team of Trinidad and Tobago

Trinidad and Tobago

Personnel
- Captain: Darren Bravo (First class) & Nicholas Pooran (List A)
- Coach: David Furlonge

Team information
- Colours: Red, white, black
- Founded: 1869
- Home ground: Queen's Park Oval, Brian Lara Cricket Academy, Diego Martin Sporting Complex

History
- Four Day wins: 4 (plus 1 shared)
- Super50 Cup wins: 12 (plus 1 shared)
- CT20 wins: 3
- Official website: https://ttcbinfo.com/

The Trinidad and Tobago national cricket team is the representative cricket team of the country of Trinidad and Tobago. The team competes under the franchise name, Trinidad and Tobago Red Force in the Cricket West Indies' Professional Cricket League which comprises both the Regional Four Day Competition and the Regional Super50. Trinidad has also won a sum of 13 regional one day titles, which is the most in the history of West Indies cricket.

The most prominent T&T cricketers include Jeffrey Stollmeyer, Sonny Ramadhin, Deryck Murray, Charlie Davis, Larry Gomes, Rangy Nanan, Gus Logie, Ian Bishop, Brian Lara, Mervyn Dillon, Daren Ganga, Ravi Rampaul, Dwayne Bravo, Denesh Ramdin and Samuel Badree.

== Team history ==
Teams from Trinidad have played first-class cricket from 1869, when Trinidad took on Demerara for two matches, winning one and losing one. They also participated in the Inter-Colonial Tournament featuring Barbados, British Guiana (formerly Demerara), and themselves, playing in all 28 tournaments that were held between 1891–92 and 1938–39. From the late 1880s, Tobago was incorporated into the crown colony of Trinidad as a ward.

After independence in 1962, the team changed its name to reflect the official name of the country, Trinidad and Tobago, and when the Shell Shield began in 1965–66 the team competed under the name of Trinidad and Tobago. They won their first title on their fourth outing, in 1969–70, and also won the next year's competition, but since then Trinidad and Tobago have only taken three titles in 35 seasons. During this time cricketers from Trinidad competed in the Beaumont Cup which had first class status.

Trinidad and Tobago won four one day titles in eight seasons from 1989–90 to 1996–97 and another four in six seasons from 2004–05 to 2009-10. As well they won consecutive titles in the 2014-15 and 2015-16 seasons with yet another title in the 2020-21 season. Such said Trinidad have won the most regional one day championships, being 13 with one shared and 12 outright titles.

T&T also featured in and were runners-up at the inaugural Champions' league T-20. The Trinbagonians eventually won a total of 3 Caribbean T20 championships.

== Squad ==
Name	Birth date	Batting style	Bowling style	Notes
Batsmen
Jason Mohammed	23 September 1986 (age 39)	Right-handed	Right-arm off spin	
Jeremy Solozano	5 October 1995 (age 30)	Left-handed	-	
Darren Bravo	6 February 1989 (age 37)	Left-handed	Right-arm medium	First Class Captain
Kyle Hope	20 November 1988 (age 37)	Right-handed	Right-arm off spin	
Yannic Cariah	22 June 1992 (age 34)	Left-handed	Right-arm leg spin	Played for West Indies Emerging team in Super50
Keagan Simmons	26 March 1999 (age 27)	Left-handed	-	
Evin Lewis	27 December 1991 (age 34)	Left-handed		
Isaiah Rajah	16 October 1993 (age 32)	Left-handed	Right-arm leg spin	
Jyd Goolie	11 May 1997 (age 29)	Left-handed	Right-arm off spin	
Cephas Cooper	11 July 1999 (age 26)	Right-handed	Right-arm off spin	
Nicholas Pooran	2 October 1995 (age 30)	Left-handed	-	List A Captain
All-rounders
Kieron Pollard	12 May 1987 (age 39)	Right-handed	Right-arm medium	
Yannick Ottley	7 September 1991 (age 34)	Right-handed	Left-arm orthodox	
Khary Pierre	22 September 1991 (age 34)	Left-handed	Left-arm orthodox	
Wicket-keepers
Joshua Da Silva	19 June 1998 (age 28)	Right-handed	-	Played for West Indies Emerging team in Super50
Steven Katwaroo	14 January 1993 (age 33)	Right-handed	-	
Denesh Ramdin	13 March 1985 (age 41)	Right-handed	-	
Spin Bowlers
Akeal Hosein	25 April 1993 (age 33)	Left-handed	Left-arm orthodox	
Imran Khan	6 July 1984 (age 41)	Right-handed	Right-arm leg spin	
Bryan Charles	9 June 1995 (age 31)	Right-handed	Right-arm off spin	
Avinash Mahabirsingh	17 April 2001 (age 25)	Right-handed	Right-arm off spin	
Kissoondath Magram			Right-arm leg spin	
Pace Bowlers
Anderson Phillip	22 August 1996 (age 29)	Right-handed	Right-arm fast-medium	
Odean Smith	1 November 1996 (age 29)	Right-handed	Right-arm medium	
Terrance Hinds	-	Right-handed	Right-arm medium-fast	
Uthman Muhammad	1 March 1989 (age 37)	Right-handed	Right-arm medium-fast	
Daniel St Clair	22 December 1987 (age 38)	Right-handed	Left-arm medium	
Shannon Gabriel	28 April 1988 (age 38)	Right-handed	Right-arm fast-medium	

== Coaching staff ==
- Head coach: (Trinidad and Tobago) David Furlonge
- Asst. Coach: (Trinidad and Tobago) Kelvin Williams
- Batting coach: n/a
- Bowling coach: n/a
- Fielding coach: n/a
- Manager: Sebastian Edwards
- Mental conditioning coach: Adarayll John
- Fitness trainer: (Trinidad and Tobago) Clinton Jeremiah
- Head Physiotherapist: n/a
- Masseur: n/a
- Performance analyst: (Trinidad and Tobago) Amrit Jadoo

== Notable players ==
The list of prominent cricketers who have represented Trinidad and Tobago includes:

- Learie Constantine
- Herman Griffith
- Clifford Roach
- Nelson Betancourt
- Jackie Grant
- Rolph Grant
- Jeffrey Stollmeyer
- Gerry Gomez
- Andy Ganteaume
- Sonny Ramadhin
- Simpson Guillen
- Joey Carew
- Deryck Murray
- Charlie Davis
- Inshan Ali
- Raphick Jumadeen
- Bernard Julien
- Larry Gomes
- Gus Logie
- Phil Simmons
- David Williams
- Ian Bishop
- Brian Lara
- Roland Holder
- Mervyn Dillon
- Dinanath Ramnarine
- Daren Ganga
- Ravi Rampaul
- Dave Mohammed
- Dwayne Bravo
- Denesh Ramdin
- Lendl Simmons
- Kieron Pollard
- Darren Bravo
- Sunil Narine
- Samuel Badree
- Robin Singh
- Jason Mohammed
- Jayden Seales
- Evin Lewis
- Nicholas Pooran

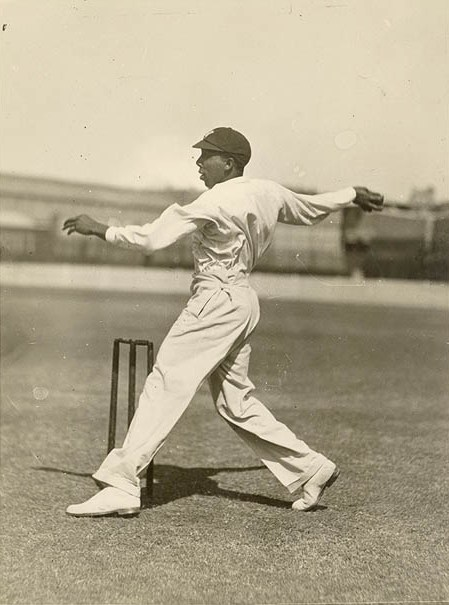
Learie Constantine, Trinidad all-rounder

== Honours ==
- Regional Four Day Competition (5): 1969–70, 1970–71, 1975–76 (shared), 1984–85, 2005–06
- Domestic one-day competition (15): 1978–79, 1980–81, 1989–90, 1991–92, 1995–1996 (shared), 1996–1997, 2004–2005, 2006–2007, 2008–2009, 2009–2010, 2014–15, 2015–16, 2020–21, 2023–24
- Caribbean T20 (3): 2011, 2012, 2013
- Stanford 20/20 (defunct) (1): 2008
- Trans-Atlantic Twenty20 Champions Cup (Stanford Super Series) (defunct) (1): 2008
- Inter-Colonial Tournament (defunct) (12): 1901–02, 1903–04, 1907–08, 1909–10, 1921–22 (shared), 1924–25, 1925–26, 1928–29, 1931–32, 1933–34, 1936–37, 1938–39

== Grounds ==
- Queen's Park Oval in Port of Spain
- Brian Lara Cricket Academy near San Fernando
- Diego Martin Sporting Complex in Diego Martin
- National Cricket Centre in Couva
- Sir Frank Worrell Memorial Ground at UWI St Augustine
- Shaw Park in Scarborough, Tobago
- Guaracara Park in Pointe-à-Pierre

== See also ==
- Trinidad and Tobago women's cricket team
- List of international cricketers from Trinidad and Tobago
- List of calypso songs about cricket
