= Pointe-à-Pierre =

Coordinates: 10°19′N 61°28′W

- Town
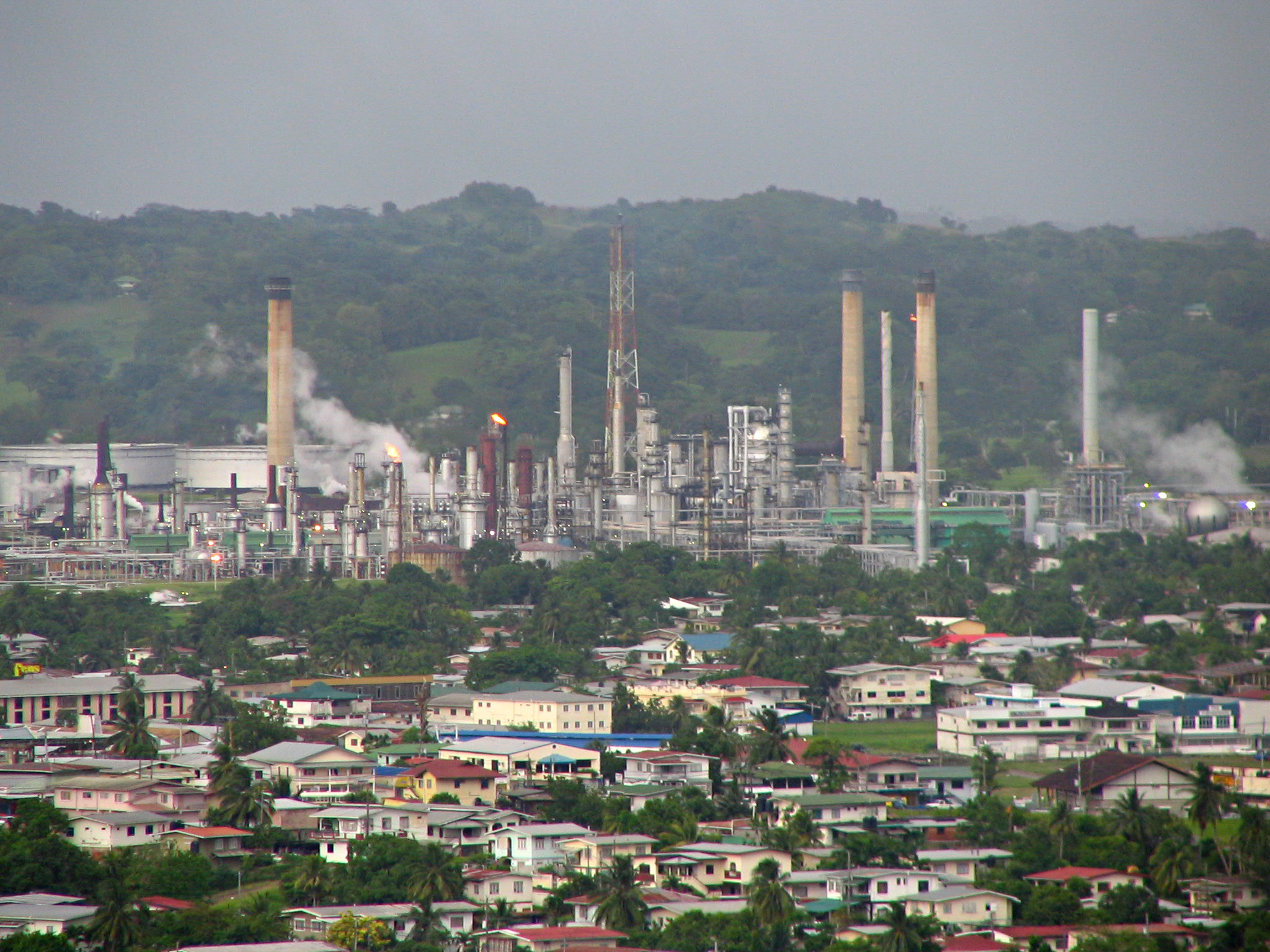
- Pointe-à-Pierre oil refinery

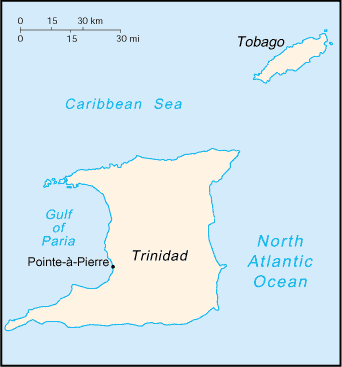
- Country: Trinidad and Tobago
- Region: Couva–Tabaquite–Talparo

Population (2011)
  - Total: 460
- Ranked
- Time zone: UTC−4 (AST)

Pointe-à-Pierre (/ˌpɔɪntəˈpɪər/ POYNT-ə-PEER) is a town in Trinidad and Tobago. It lies north of San Fernando and south of Claxton Bay. It is most famous as the site of the country's largest (and now, only) oil refinery which used to be run by Petrotrin, the state-owned oil company.

The town was built for and is populated by employees of the company. Facilities provided for the residents include a primary school, a yacht club and a staff club equipped with a pool, tennis courts and squash courts (and in the mid-1960s an 18-hole golf course and a secondary school, of which only the golf course remains).

The oil refinery was built by Trinidad Leaseholds Limited (TLL) and expanded by Texaco. It was transferred to Trintoc when the government purchased the land-based assets of Texaco Trinidad Limited, and then incorporated into Petrotrin.

The town is also the home of the world-famous Pointe-à-Pierre Wild Fowl Trust, a wildlife reserve for waterfowl located within the secured premises of the Petrotrin oil refinery.

Pointe-à-Pierre is separated from Marabella by the Guaracara River and from Gasparillo by the Sir Solomon Hochoy Highway. It lies on the Gulf of Paria and is an important port for the export and import of petroleum products. At the southern edge of Pointe-à-Pierre lies Guaracara Park, known for its cricket matches.

The refinery was closed in 2018.

== Notable people ==
- Stephen Ames, golfer
- Floella Benjamin, actress and TV presenter
- Dale de Neef, cricketer
- David Jenkins, sprinter
- Trevor McDonald, news presenter
- Haji Gokool Meah, businessman
