= North Trinidad cricket team =

The North Trinidad cricket team played first-class cricket from 1959 to 1979, competing in the Beaumont Cup and its successor competition the Texaco Cup.

North Trinidad played South Trinidad annually for the Beaumont Cup from 1925–26 to 1957–58, when the matches were not considered first-class, and from 1958–59 to 1969–70, when they had first-class status. Of these 12 first-class matches, North Trinidad won five and the rest were drawn. Their highest score in this period was by Bryan Davis, who scored 188 not out in 1966–67, and the best bowling figures were by Bernard Julien, who took 7 for 63 (including the first three wickets of the innings with a hat-trick) in 1968–69.

Beginning in 1970–71, East Trinidad and Central Trinidad made up a four-team first-class competition, which was renamed the Texaco Cup in 1971–72. North Trinidad won the title in 1977–78. In 1978–79 Tobago joined the competition. That was the final season in which the Texaco Cup had first-class status. In this period North Trinidad played 21 matches, winning two, losing one, and drawing the other 18. North Trinidad's highest score in this period was by Joey Carew, who scored 182 against Central Trinidad in 1970–71, and the best bowling figures were 6 for 17 (10 for 34 in the match) by Pascall Roberts against Tobago in 1978–79.

In all, North Trinidad played 33 first-class matches, with seven wins, one loss (to Central Trinidad in the 1973–74 final) and 25 draws.

North Trinidad played all their home matches at Queen's Park Oval, Port of Spain.
