= Beaumont Cup =

Trinidadian cricket competition

The Beaumont Cup was a Trinidadian first-class cricket competition which regional sides competed for, the matches taking place over three days.

== History ==
The competition began in 1925–26, when Rolland Beaumont, the South African Test player who had moved to Trinidad and become manager of an oil company, donated the cup to be played for by North Trinidad and South Trinidad. Beginning with the 1958–59 season the annual match was granted first-class status. In 1970–71 East Trinidad and Central Trinidad joined the competition, which now had two preliminary matches and a final.

In 1971–72 the competition was renamed the Texaco Cup. From 1975–76 to 1977–78 the competition was decided on a round robin format, with six matches each season. In 1978–79 Tobago joined the competition, and there were ten round-robin matches. That was the final season in which the Texaco Cup had first-class status.

In 1975–76 the Beaumont Cup was revived, to be contested by two teams again, in an annual match between South and Central Trinidad and North and East Trinidad. It had first-class status from 1975–76 to 1979–80, and from 1982–83 to 1984–85.

The Beaumont Cup was also held as a non-first-class contest between South and Central Trinidad and North and East Trinidad in 1980–81, 1981–82 and 1985–86. The non-first-class contest between the two teams continued under the names Trintoc Trophy (1986–87 to 1995–96) and Gerry Gomez Memorial Trophy (1996–97 to 2000–01).

== Honour board ==
The tables below list the winners of the Beaumont Cup and Texaco Cup in the seasons in which the competition had first-class status.

=== Beaumont Cup 1958–59 to 1969–70 ===
Contested by North Trinidad and South Trinidad. Winners held the Cup until they were defeated outright in a subsequent season.

Season	Winning team/Result
1958–59	Match drawn
1959–60	Match drawn
1960–61	North Trinidad
1961–62	North Trinidad
1962–63	North Trinidad
1963–64	North Trinidad
1964–65	Match drawn
1965–66	North Trinidad
1966–67	Match drawn
1967–68	Match drawn
1968–69	Match drawn
1969–70	Match drawn

=== Beaumont Cup 1970–71, Texaco Cup 1971–72 to 1978–79 ===
Contested by North Trinidad, South Trinidad, Central Trinidad and East Trinidad. Tobago also competed in 1978–79.

Season	Winning team/Result	Opponent/Teams
1970–71	Match drawn	North Trinidad, East Trinidad
1971–72	East Trinidad	South Trinidad
1972–73	South Trinidad	East Trinidad
1973–74	Central Trinidad	North Trinidad
1974–75	North Trinidad	East Trinidad
1975–76	South Trinidad	Round robin format
1976–77	East Trinidad	Round robin format
1977–78	North Trinidad	Round robin format
1978–79	Central Trinidad	Round robin format

=== Beaumont Cup 1975–76 to 1984–85 ===
Contested by North and East Trinidad and South and Central Trinidad.

Season	Winning team/Result
1975–76	Match drawn
1976–77	North and East Trinidad
1977–78	Match abandoned
1978–79	South and Central Trinidad
1979–80	South and Central Trinidad
1982–83	Match drawn
1983–84	North and East Trinidad
1984–85	North and East Trinidad
