= 1965–66 Shell Shield season =

Cricket tournament

- Dates: 27 January – 14 March 1966
- Administrator(s): WICB
- Cricket format: First-class (four-day)
- Tournament format(s): Round-robin
- Champions: Barbados (1st title)
- Participants: 5
- Matches: 10
- Most runs: (Jamaica) Easton McMorris (553)
- Most wickets: (Barbados) David Holford (18)

The 1965–66 Shell Shield season was the inaugural edition of what is now the Regional Four Day Competition, the domestic first-class cricket competition for the countries of the West Indies Cricket Board (WICB). The tournament was sponsored by Royal Dutch Shell, with matches played from 27 January to 14 March 1966.

Five teams contested the tournament – Barbados, British Guiana, Jamaica, Trinidad and Tobago, and a Combined Islands team (drawn from the Leeward and Windward Islands). Each team played the others once, making for a total of ten matches. Barbados were undefeated during the competition, winning three matches and drawing the other to win the inaugural title. Jamaican batsman Easton McMorris and Barbadian bowler David Holford, led the tournament in runs and wickets, respectively.

== Teams ==
Barbados	Guiana	Combined Islands	Jamaica	Trinidad and Tobago
Gary Sobers (c); David Allan; Arthur Bethell; Rawle Brancker; Robin Bynoe; Richard Edwards; Charlie Griffith; David Holford; Tony Howard; Conrad Hunte; Peter Lashley; Seymour Nurse; Tony White	Lance Gibbs (c); Basil Butcher; Steve Camacho; Rex Collymore; Roy Fredericks; Sydney Jackman; Rohan Kanhai; Clive Lloyd; Vincent Mayers; Edwin Mohamed; Randolph Ramnarace; Burlin Saheed; Joe Solomon	Clem John (c); Hesketh Benjamin; Henry Elwin; Adolphus Freeland; Edgar Gilbert; Evelyn Gresham; Len Harris; Auckland Hector; Kaleb Laurent; Winston Mauricette; Jerome Mellow; Hilson Phillip; Jerome Pierre; Melford Roach; Irvine Shillingford	Jackie Hendriks (c); Kenneth Barnett; Herman Bennett; Leonard Chambers; Rudolph Cohen; Maurice Foster; Teddy Griffith; Ferdie Harvey; Ron Headley; Leonard Levy; Easton McMorris; Lawson Matthews; Renford Pinnock; Altemont Wellington	Willie Rodriguez (c); Eddie Aleong; Jamiel Ali; Joey Carew; Alvin Corneal; Bryan Davis; Charlie Davis; Richard de Souza; Bruce Eligon; Kenneth Furlonge; Leo John; Arthur Paul; Kenneth Roberts; Pascall Roberts

== Points table ==
Team	Pld	W	L	LWF	DWF	DLF	P
Barbados	4	3	0	0	1	0	42
Guiana	4	1	1	0	2	0	24
Combined Islands	4	1	1	0	0	2	16
Trinidad and Tobago	4	0	1	1	1	1	12
Jamaica	4	0	1	0	1	2	10
Source: CricketArchive

Key

- W – Outright win (12 points)
- L – Outright loss (0 points)
- LWF – Loss, but won first innings (4 points)
- DWF – Drawn, but won first innings (6 points)
- DLF – Drawn, and lost first innings (2 points)
- P – Overall points

== Fixtures ==
27–31 January 1966
Scorecard

Jamaica	v	Combined Islands
283 (100.2 overs)		250 (97 overs)
285/5d (95.5 overs)		264/5 (91 overs)

Match drawn
Antigua Recreation Ground, St. John's

- Kenneth Barnett (Jam) made his first-class debut.

2–5 February 1966
Scorecard

Trinidad and Tobago	v	Jamaica
334 (118.3 overs)		236 (86.5 overs)
213/6 (92 overs)		35/1 (12 overs)

Match drawn
Queen's Park Oval, Port of Spain

- Bruce Eligon (T&T) and Leonard Chambers (Jam) made their first-class debuts.

9–12 February 1966
Scorecard

Combined Islands	v	Barbados
141 (57.1 overs)		396/5 (93.4 overs)

Match drawn
Kensington Oval, Bridgetown

- No play was possible on the third and fourth days.
- Barbadian bowler Rawle Brancker took 6/39, the best figures of the competition.

12–16 February 1966
Scorecard

Guiana	v	Trinidad and Tobago
398/9 dec. (200.3 overs)		192 (127 overs)
		77/2 (47 overs)

Match drawn
Queen's Park Oval, Port of Spain

- Sydney Jackman (BG) and Eddie Aleong (T&T) made their first-class debuts.

18–22 February 1966
Scorecard

Guiana	v	Barbados
227 (71.3 overs)		559/9 dec. (189 overs)
317 (101.5 overs)

Barbados won by an innings and 15 runs
Kensington Oval, Bridgetown

- Tony Howard (Bar) made his first-class debut.
- Barbados made 559/9 in its only innings, the highest team score of the competition, and the team's captain, Gary Sobers, made 204 runs, the highest individual score.

25–28 February 1966
Scorecard

Trinidad and Tobago	v	Barbados
148 (55.1 overs)		427 (110.2 overs)
171 (63.1 overs)

Barbados won by an innings and 108 runs
Kensington Oval, Bridgetown

25 February – 1 March 1966
Scorecard

Jamaica	v	Guiana
222 (87.2 overs)		421/9 dec. (144.1 overs)
404/9 dec. (162.5 overs)		27/0 (14 overs)

Match drawn
Sabina Park, Kingston

4–8 March 1966
Scorecard

Combined Islands	v	Guiana
176 (86.4 overs)		306 (107.4 overs)
251 (110 overs)		122/4 (31 overs)

British Guiana won by 6 wickets
Warner Park, Basseterre

- Burlin Saheed (BG) made his first-class debut.

5–8 March 1966
Scorecard

Jamaica	v	Barbados
193 (78.5 overs)		421/4 dec. (132 overs)
260 (96 overs)		36/3 (10.2 overs)

Barbados won by 7 wickets
Sabina Park, Kingston

- Altemont Wellington (Jam) made his first-class debut.

11–14 March 1966
Scorecard

Combined Islands	v	Trinidad and Tobago
266 (73.2 overs)		295 (79.1 overs)
145 (65 overs)		85 (36.3 overs)

Combined Islands won by 31 runs
Victoria Park, Castries

- Trinidad and Tobago's second-innings total was the lowest of the competition.

== Statistics ==
=== Most runs ===
The top five run-scorers are included in this table, listed by runs scored and then by batting average.

Player	Team	Runs	Inns	Avg	Highest	100s	50s
Easton McMorris	Jamaica	553	8	92.16	190	3	0
Peter Lashley	Barbados	387	4	129.00	121*	2	2
Seymour Nurse	Barbados	364	4	91.00	153	2	1
Clive Lloyd	Guiana	344	5	86.00	194	2	0
Irvine Shillingford	Combined Islands	308	7	51.33	113*	1	2

=== Most wickets ===
The top five wicket-takers are listed in this table, listed by wickets taken and then by bowling average.

Player	Team	Overs	Wkts	Ave	5	10	BBI
David Holford	Barbados	152.3	18	21.44	0	0	4/51
Charlie Griffith	Barbados	75.5	15	13.73	0	0	4/41
Gary Sobers	Barbados	94.3	14	20.57	1	0	6/56
Edgar Gilbert	Combined Islands	129.3	13	26.07	0	0	3/12
Willie Rodriguez	Trinidad and Tobago	104.3	12	27.25	1	0	5/71
