= 1966–67 Shell Shield season =

Cricket tournament

- Dates: 8 February – 3 April 1967
- Administrator: WICB
- Cricket format: First-class (four-day)
- Tournament format: Round-robin
- Champions: Barbados (2nd title)
- Participants: 5
- Matches: 10
- Most runs: (Barbados) Peter Lashley (510)
- Most wickets: (Barbados) Rawle Brancker (Jamaica) Rudolph Cohen (15)

The 1966–67 Shell Shield season was the second edition of what is now the Regional Four Day Competition, the domestic first-class cricket competition for the countries of the West Indies Cricket Board (WICB). The tournament was sponsored by Royal Dutch Shell, with matches played from 8 February to 3 April 1967.

Six teams contested the tournament – Barbados, British Guiana, Jamaica, the Leeward Islands, Trinidad and Tobago, and the Windward Islands. However, the Leeward and Windward Islands both played fewer matches than the other teams, and the results from their matches did not count towards the title. For a second season running, Barbados were undefeated, winning three matches and drawing the other to claim a second consecutive title. Barbadian batsman Peter Lashley led the tournament in runs, while his teammate Rawle Brancker and Jamaican bowler Rudolph Cohen led the tournament in wickets.

== Teams ==
Barbados	Guyana	Jamaica
Gary Sobers (c); Arthur Bethell; Rawle Brancker; Robin Bynoe; Richard Edwards; Geoff Greenidge; Charlie Griffith; Vanburn Holder; David Holford; Tony Howard; Conrad Hunte; Erskine King; Peter Lashley; Seymour Nurse; Wycliffe Phillips; Alfred Taylor	Lance Gibbs (c); Basil Butcher; Steve Camacho; Lloyd Cornelius; Winston English; Roy Fredericks; Ovid Glasgow; Alvin Kallicharran; Rohan Kanhai; Clive Lloyd; Vincent Mayers; Edwin Mohamed; Geoffrey Murray; Randolph Ramnarace; Joe Solomon	Jackie Hendriks (c); Arthur Barrett; Paul Buchanan; Rudolph Cohen; Maurice Foster; Victor Fray; Teddy Griffith; Ferdie Harvey; Neville Hawkins; Lester King; Easton McMorris; Renford Pinnock; Altemont Wellington
Leeward Islands	Trinidad and Tobago	Windward Islands
Len Harris (c); Hesketh Benjamin; Leroy Coury; William Duberry; Clement Francis; Adolphus Freeland; Edgar Gilbert; Auckland Hector; Clement Hicks; Cecil Martin; Hilson Phillip; Lionel Thomas; Harold Walters	Willie Rodriguez (c); Inshan Ali; Jamiel Ali; Joey Carew; Andrew Clarke; Bryan Davis; Charlie Davis; Richard de Souza; Kenneth Furlonge; Wes Hall; Leo John; Deryck Murray; Harry Ramoutar; Pascall Roberts	Evelyn Gresham (c); David Archer; Hollis Bristol; Earl Cenac; C. Charlemagne; Sparrow Duncan; Henry Elwin; Mike Findlay; Tyrone Harbin; Clem John; Kaleb Laurent; Bryan Mauricette; Jerome Mellow; Irvine Shillingford

== Points table ==
Team	Pld	W	L	LWF	DWF	DLF	P
Barbados	4	3	0	0	0	1	26
Guyana	4	1	0	0	2	1	14
Trinidad and Tobago	4	1	1	0	1	1	8
Jamaica	4	1	1	0	1	1	8
Leeward Islands	2	0	2	0	0	0	0
Windward Islands	2	0	2	0	0	0	0
Source: CricketArchive

Key

- W – Outright win (12 points)
- L – Outright loss (0 points)
- LWF – Loss, but won first innings (4 points)
- DWF – Drawn, but won first innings (6 points)
- DLF – Drawn, and lost first innings (2 points)
- P – Overall points

== Fixtures ==
8–11 February 1967
Scorecard

Trinidad and Tobago	v	Jamaica
330/8 dec. (159 overs)		268 (112.3 overs)
155/6 (58 overs)

Match drawn
Sabina Park, Kingston

- Arthur Barrett (Jam) and Andrew Clarke (T&T) made their first-class debuts.
- Pascall Roberts (T&T) was no-balled for throwing in Jamaica's first innings.

9–11 February 1967
Scorecard

Leeward Islands	v	Barbados
159 (65 overs)		406/6 dec. (96.2 overs)
171 (50.5 overs)

Barbados won by an innings and 76 runs
Warner Park, Basseterre

- Lionel Thomas, William Duberry (Lee), Wycliffe Phillips, Erskine King, and Geoff Greenidge (Bar) made their first-class debuts.

16–18 February 1967
Scorecard

Windward Islands	v	Trinidad and Tobago
125 (50.4 overs)		359 (105 overs)
125 (60.5 overs)

Trinidad and Tobago won by an innings and 109 runs
Queen's Park Oval, Port of Spain

- Hollis Bristol, C. Charlemagne, and Bryan Mauricette (Win) made their first-class debuts.
- David Archer (Win) was no-balled for throwing in Trinidad and Tobago's first innings.

22–25 February 1967
Scorecard

Barbados	v	Trinidad and Tobago
149 (45.1 overs)		135 (42.2 overs)
337 (103.5 overs)		292 (99 overs)

Barbados won by 59 runs
Queen's Park Oval, Port of Spain

- Vanburn Holder and Alfred Taylor (Bar) made their first-class debuts.

28 February – 3 March 1967
Scorecard

Guyana	v	Barbados
641/5 dec. (165.5 overs)		552 (192.4 overs)
244/5 (64 overs)

Match drawn
Bourda, Georgetown

- Lloyd Cornelius, Winston English, and Ovid Glasgow (Guy) made their first-class debuts.

15–18 March 1967
Scorecard

Guyana	v	Windward Islands
259 (73.5 overs)		176 (71.5 overs)
254/8 dec. (72 overs)		107 (44.5 overs)

Guyana won by 230 runs
Queen's Park, St. George's

- Alvin Kallicharran (Guy), Earl Cenac, Sparrow Duncan, and Tyrone Harbin (Win) made their first-class debuts.

16–20 March 1967
Scorecard

Leeward Islands	v	Jamaica
205 (64.3 overs)		213 (80.4 overs)
309/9 dec. (108 overs)		303/3 (107.2 overs)

Jamaica won by 7 wickets
Antigua Recreation Ground, St. John's

- Cecil Martin (Lee) made his first-class debut.

22–27 March 1967
Scorecard

Barbados	v	Jamaica
521/8 (142.3 overs)		361 (125.2 overs)
160/4 (27.4 overs)		226 (75.5 overs)

Barbados won by 94 runs
Kensington Oval, Bridgetown

- Barbados' Geoff Greenidge took 7/124 in Jamaica's first innings, the best bowling figures of the tournament.

22–27 March 1967
Scorecard

Guyana	v	Trinidad and Tobago
422/5 dec. (94.3 overs)		190 (61.3 overs)
		164/4 (67 overs)

Match drawn
Bourda, Georgetown

30 March – 3 April 1967
Scorecard

Guyana	v	Jamaica
450 (113.2 overs)		538 (160.2 overs)
300/5 dec. (72 overs)		69/6 (39 overs)

Match drawn
Bourda, Georgetown

- Jamaica's Easton McMorris scored 218 in the first innings, the highest individual score of the tournament.

== Statistics ==
=== Most runs ===
The top five run-scorers are included in this table, listed by runs scored and then by batting average.

Player	Team	Runs	Inns	Avg	Highest	100s	50s
Peter Lashley	Barbados	510	5	102.00	204	2	2
Basil Butcher	Guyana	505	6	126.25	183*	3	0
Roy Fredericks	Guyana	499	7	83.16	128*	3	0
Rohan Kanhai	Guyana	459	6	91.80	164	2	1
Garfield Sobers	Barbados	389	6	77.80	165	1	1

=== Most wickets ===
The top five wicket-takers are listed in this table, listed by wickets taken and then by bowling average.

Player	Team	Overs	Wkts	Ave	5	10	BBI
Rawle Brancker	Barbados	149.4	15	26.53	0	0	4/53
Rudolph Cohen	Jamaica	137.4	15	31.86	0	0	4/41
Kaleb Laurent	Windward Islands	90.0	13	20.30	2	1	6/76
Tony Howard	Barbados	120.5	13	21.92	1	0	5/46
Randolph Ramnarace	Guyana	109.0	13	28.92	0	0	4/39
