= West Indies national football team =

International representative football team

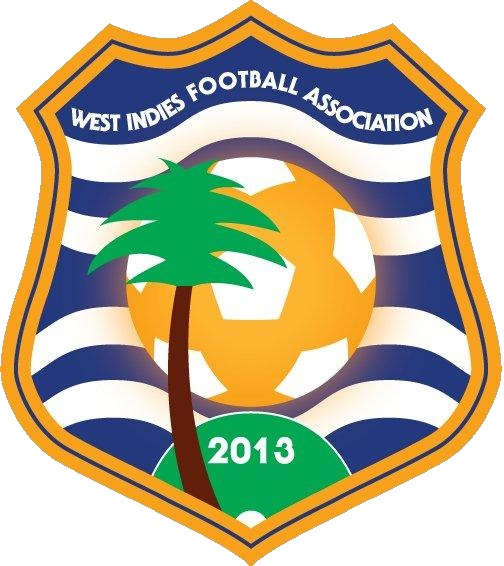
- Association: West Indies Football Association (WIFA)
- Confederation: N.F.-Board (former)
First colours	Second colours

First international
- (West Indies Federation) WIFA Pirates 5–4 Petrotrin Sports Club (Trinidad and Tobago; 17 January 2015)
- Website: http://www.wifa.ca/ (defunct)

The West Indies national football team is the team that represents the West Indies. It is not a member of FIFA, CFU or CONCACAF, however they were affiliated with the N.F.-Board, an organisation for teams who are non-affiliated with FIFA, until 2017 when the status of membership was abolished. The team is organised by the West Indies Football Association (WIFA), and its president is James Baird.

The West Indies team uses Caribbean players from all over the world, of whom have not played with their own national team, and gives them the opportunity to represent the West Indies and let them experience international football.

The team was scheduled to play in the 2014 Viva World Cup, however due to the crisis and breakup of the N.F.-Board, as well as its subsequent failure to organise the tournament, it was never played.

== History ==
There have been many attempts to put a West Indies football team together but in the past they mostly failed; although, there was the British Caribbean Football Association, which was established in 1957 and played various matches as the select team from the Caribbean mostly against English opposition.

In 2013, the idea of a united team of the West Indies was brought back and put into action, with the founding of the West Indies Football Association by James Baird, in Trinidad and Tobago.

Due to the nature of the organisation, players from across the region have the opportunity to participate on a world footballing stage where perhaps they would not be offered that chance with their home nation.

The WIFA Pirates (the development squad) played their first ever proper match on January 26, 2015, in a friendly match against the Petrotrin Sports Club (of the Trinidad and Tobago Football Association), winning 5–4.

== Futsal ==
The West Indies futsal team is based in London, where many of the West Indies futsal players participate in the English football league system. The head coach of the team is Englishman Robert Brassett.

== Squads ==
=== National Squad ===
As of 20 January 2015

Note: Flags indicate national team as defined under FIFA eligibility rules; some limited exceptions apply. Players may hold more than one non-FIFA nationality.

No.	Pos.	Nation	Player
—	GK	CUB	José Manuel Miranda Boudy
—	GK	FRA	Paul Nephtalie Decimus
—	DF	ENG	Jerel Ifil
—	DF	ENG	Kirkie Thomas
—	DF	COL	Milton Correa
—	DF	ENG	Keon Richardson
—	DF	CAN	Clint Crouch

No.	Pos.	Nation	Player
—	MF	COL	Julio Fernandes De La Roas
—	MF	SWE	Jonathan Grannum
—	MF	ENG	Jamie Barnwell-Edinboro
—	FW	BLZ	Colville Richards
—	FW	TRI	Keston Raphael
—	FW	SWE	Jade Grannum
—	FW	MSR	Jaylee Allen Hodgson
—	FW	ENG	Craig Matthews

=== Local Squad (WIFA Pirates) ===
WIFA partnered with Texas Premier Soccer League club side Galveston Pirate SC on August 20, 2014. The partnership between both clubs saw the introduction of the WIFA Pirates, which would act as the WIFA development squad.

{-} Note: Flags indicate national team as defined under FIFA eligibility rules; some limited exceptions apply. Players may hold more than one non-FIFA nationality. Squad correct as of Jan 26, 2015.

No.	Pos.	Nation	Player
—	GK	TRI	Daniel Ringis
—	GK	TRI	Joshua Lamb
—	DF	TRI	Andrew Thomas
—	DF	TRI	Nixon Thomas
—	DF	TRI	Haylon Martin
—	DF	TRI	Shakir Thompson
—	DF	TRI	Jaheil Austin
—	DF	TRI	Gavin Luke
—	MF	TRI	Francis Rojas
—	MF	TRI	Lannel Hamilton
—	MF	TRI	Kevon Smart
—	MF	TRI	Joel Melville
—	MF	TRI	Brendon Romero
—	MF	TRI	Stephen King
—	MF	TRI	Kelson Wilson
—	MF	TRI	Marcus Alexander
—	MF	TRI	Darrion Bernard
—	MF	TRI	Khaleel Reid-Devonish
—	MF	TRI	Jerome Thomas
—	FW	TRI	Erik Ranoo
—	FW	TRI	Runako Vincent
—	FW	TRI	Tacuma Sadlow
—	FW	TRI	Jeron Melville
—	FW	TRI	Keston Raphael
—	FW	TRI	Lannel Hamilton
—	FW	TRI	Kareem Alleyen
—	FW	TRI	Che Edwards
—	FW	TRI	Javan-Marc Joseph

== WIFA Leadership ==
Name	Role	Nationality
James Baird	President	(Scotland)
James Baird	Head coach	(Scotland)
Bill Alsobrook	Vice-president	(United States)
John Furlong	Secretary	(Trinidad and Tobago)
Justin Lall	Finance	(Trinidad and Tobago)
Debby Ann Ojar-Baird	Director/ Attorney-at-Law	(Trinidad and Tobago)
Marc Roseblade	Media/Website	(Scotland)
Nathan Langaigne	Assistant Coach	(Trinidad and Tobago)
Clinton Lewis	Coach	(Trinidad and Tobago)
John Sime	Goalkeeper Coach	(Scotland)
Robert Brassett	Futsal Coach	(England)
Erik Klint	Scout	(Sweden) Have left the FA
TBA	Physio	

== Results and fixtures ==
=== Recent results ===
21 January 2015 Friendly match	WIFA Pirates	5–4	Petrotrin Sports Club	Santa Flora, Trinidad and Tobago
18:00	Che Edwards x 3 Tacuma Sadlow; OG	Report		Stadium: Petrotrin Compound
