= Galveston County Rangers Football Club =

Rangers Football Club
- Full name: Galveston Rangers Football Club
- Nicknames: The Gers; The Blues; The Light Blues
- Founded: 2015 (1916 as Galveston Pirate SC)
- Stadium: Texas Avenue Baptist Church, 320 Texas Avenue, League City, TX, 77573
- Capacity: 700-1000
- Owner: William Alsobrook
- Head Coach: Douglas Mann
- League: TBA
- 2014-15: 5th Playoffs: Did Not Participate
Home colors	Away colors	Third colors

Galveston County Rangers Football Club was an American soccer team based in Galveston County, Texas. Originally named Galveston Pirate Soccer Club, they were renamed Galveston County Rangers FC in March 2015, Galveston Pirate SC was founded in 1916, the team played until the 1940s, then reemerged in the 1960s and 1970s for a period of about seven years each time.

In 2010 the team was again reborn and played in the fourth-tier National Premier Soccer League as an expansion team in 2011–12, a season they finished as the champions of the South Central Conference. On March 11, 2014 Texas Premier Soccer League owner and president, Brendan Keyes announced that William Alsobrook had been named sole owner of the franchise.

The team has failed to join a league since re-branding under the Rangers name, and with no website updates or press announcements the team is presumed inactive or folded.

The team's home field is Texas Avenue Baptist Church, owned by Texas Avenue Baptist Church in League City Texas. The team's colors are Royal Blue, White and Red.

== History ==
Rangers FC, as Pirate SC, has a long history in the Galveston area going back to the original soccer team of 1916. The team came back in the 1960s and 70s, but lost momentum.

=== Rangers FC joins TBA ===
Galveston Rangers are founding members of a statewide semiprofessional men's league that will be announced shortly.

=== Rangers announce start of Women's Team ===
In February 2015 Galveston Rangers Football Club announced they would be fielding three women's teams. The sides include a first team which will be a feeder club for the Houston Aces, a reserve team, and a developmental team.

=== Rangers announce start of Youth Academy ===
In February 2015 Galveston County Rangers Football Club announced they would be launching a youth academy system. The academy will feature U5-U19 Boys Girls and Coed sides for all levels of play.

=== Rangers FC Official Affiliations ===
Galveston Rangers FC have announced official affiliation partnerships with: Glasgow Rangers Football Club Glasgow, Scotland, United Kingdom Empoli Football Club, Perugia, Italy, Alloway FC, Bundaberg, Queensland, Australia; Monmouth Town AFC, Monmouth Town, Wales, United Kingdom; Walsall Football Club, Walsall, England, United Kingdom; The West Indies Football Association, St. Joseph Trinidad; Walsall Football Club (Sierra Leone); Atlentico Stars FC and Atlentico Stars Youth Soccer Academy (ASYSA) in Kisumu, Nyalenda Kenya, Houston Aces, Houston, Texas, United States. SC Juelich 1910, Juelich, Germany

=== Notable Matches ===
As Pirate SC notable matches include Monterrey Rayados, Houston Dynamo, San Antonio Scorpions.

== Crest & Jersey ==
The colors of Ranger's crest are royal blue, red and white. The Star with the inscription GPSC 1916 is a nod to the club's origins from Galveston Pirate Soccer Club first formed in 1916.

=== Home Uniform Sponsor ===
Galveston Rangers FC have not announced a shirt sponsor for 2015/16 Season

=== Away Uniform Sponsor ===
Galveston Rangers FC have not announced an Away Shirt Sponsor for 2015/16 Season Pirate Soccer Club were sponsored by Miller Lite in 2014/15

== Stadium ==
=== Current Stadium ===
Texas Avenue Baptist Church, owned by Texas Avenue Baptist Church; League City Galveston County, Texas Texas (2015–Present).

The club will play their upcoming (League TBA) matches at Texas Avenue Baptist Church, TBD, Galveston County TX.

Rangers will play home games here over the course of the 2015–2016 season and beyond.

=== Previous Stadiums ===
- Kermit Courville Stadium; Galveston, Texas (2010–2011)
- Weis Middle School Stadium; Galveston, Texas (2012)
- Dow Park; Deer Park, Texas (2013/14)
- International Soccer Development Center; Alvin, Texas (2014–2015)

== Team ==
- Owner: (United States) (Texas) William Alsobrook
- Equity Partners:

=== Senior Club Staff ===
- Chief Executive Officer: (United States) (Texas) William Alsobrook
- Chief Human Resources Officer: (United States) Bethany Alsobrook
- Chief Financial Officer: (United States) Bethany Alsobrook
- Chief Operating Officer: (United States) Ernie Alsobrook
- Senior Vice President: (United States) Linda Alsobrook
- Executive Vice President for Soccer Operations: (Scotland) James Baird
- Executive Vice President of Marketing: (United States) (New Zealand) Tyler Cambell
- Executive Vice President: (United States) Lonnie King
- General Manager: (United States) Creighton Brooks
- Assistant General Manager: (United States) Randy Wooster
- Director of Coaching: (United States) (France) Bijan Timjani
- Youth Academy Director: (United States) Brandon Adler
- Youth Academy Director of Coaching: (United States) (Venezuela) Daniel Parejo

Coaching Staff

- Head coach: (United States) Douglas Mann
- Assistant Coach: (United States) (France) Bijan Timjani
- Assistant Coach: (United States) (Texas) William Alsobrook
- Assistant Coach: (Barbados) Irvelli Morris
- Goalkeepers Coach: (Scotland) John Sime
- Goalkeepers Coach: (Scotland) James Baird
- Goalkeepers Coach: (France) Jacques Leglib
- Athletic Trainer: (United States) Bridget Brooks
- Assistant Athletic Trainer: TBD
- Manager, PR/Media: (United States) Douglas Mann
- Equipment Manager: (United States)
- Team Physician:
- Team Nurse:
- Dance Team Coordinator:

=== 1st Team Squad ===
As of 5 July 2015

Note: Flags indicate national team as defined under FIFA eligibility rules; some limited exceptions apply. Players may hold more than one non-FIFA nationality.

No.	Pos.	Nation	Player
—	GK	SCO	James Baird
—	GK	USA	Jose Maldando
—	DF	USA	Randy Wooster
—	DF	VEN	Danny Parejo
—	DF	USA	Marcos Martinez
—	DF	USA	Allen Vorholt
—	DF	HON	Yoni Urbina-Santos
—	DF	USA	Jeff Schafer
—	MF	COL	Josh Brieva c ****
—	MF	USA	Pedro Gori
—	MF	USA	Andres Galaraccin
—	MF	USA	Creighton Brooks c
—	MF	VIR	Kai Rennie
—	MF	USA	Alexis Ortiz
—	MF	USA	Mike Ortiz
—	MF	USA	Noah Beiber*
—	FW	BLZ	Colville Richards
—	FW	USA	Bryan Mann
—	FW	USA	Erick Alfaro
—	FW	USA	Victor Muniz

(*On Loan to Toronto Lynx for 2015 USL PDL Season) (**** On loan to Atletico Juniors FC for trial) c Captain
