= 1962–63 Ranji Trophy =

Indian cricket tournament

- The Ranji Trophy
- Administrator: BCCI
- Cricket format: First-class
- Tournament format: Knockout
- Champions: Bombay (14th title)
- Participants: 21
- Most runs: Pankaj Roy (Bengal) (662)
- Most wickets: Baloo Gupte (Bombay) (38)

The 1962–63 Ranji Trophy was the 29th season of the Ranji Trophy. Bombay won the title defeating Rajasthan in the final. The tournament was severely impacted by the Chinese Aggression of 1962. Services and Railways pulled out of the tournament after playing one game each. Being so close to the action Assam and Odisha had to pull out of the tournament. When the ceasefire was ordered, the invaders were only a few kilometres away from Tezpur, which was the headquarters of Assam cricket. Bihar played one match and then closed their season as most of their players were employed in firms and factories which were pressed into defence production.

== Highlights ==
- 8-ball overs were used for the only time in Ranji Trophy.
- Following India's 0–5 loss to West Indies in the 1961–62 away series, BCCI contracted four West Indian fast bowlers to play in the Ranji Trophy. Thus Charlie Stayers played for Bombay, Roy Gilchrist for Hyderabad, Lester King for Bengal and Chester Watson for Delhi.
- Subhash Gupte took 15 for 104 for Rajasthan v Vidarbha. This was the best bowling in a match in Ranji Trophy till 1985–86.
- Rajinder Goel took 6 for 6 in four overs for Northern Punjab v Southern Punjab.
- Pankaj Roy scored hundreds in both innings for Bengal v Hyderabad in the quarter-final. This match involved fiery bowling by the West Indian fast bowlers Roy Gilchrist and Lester King
- G. S. Ramchand scored a hundred in his third successive Ranji final, a unique feat.

== Group stage ==
=== West Zone ===
Team	Pld	W	L	D	T	NR	Pts	Q
Bombay	4	3	0	1	0	0	39	2.512
Baroda	4	1	1	2	0	0	23	1.051
Saurashtra	4	1	1	2	0	0	19	0.990
Maharashtra	4	0	1	3	0	0	14	0.713
Gujarat	4	0	2	2	0	0	6	0.561

=== East Zone ===
Team	Pld	W	L	D	T	NR	Pts	Q
Bengal	2	2	0	0	0	0	21	3.653
Bihar (Note: Orissa's match against Bihar was not played.)	2	0	1	0	0	1	2	0.370
Orissa (Note: Orissa's match against Bihar was not played.)	2	0	1	0	0	1	2	0.191

=== North Zone ===
Team	Pld	W	L	D	T	NR	Pts	Q
Delhi	5	3	0	0	0	2	35	2.595
Northern Punjab	5	2	1	0	0	2	24	1.235
Railways (Note: Railways's only match was against Jammu & Kashmir.)	5	1	0	0	0	4	19	7.179
Services (Note: Services's only match was against Jammu & Kashmir.)	5	1	0	0	0	4	18	2.051
Southern Punjab	5	1	2	0	0	2	15	0.645
Jammu & Kashmir	5	0	5	0	0	0	0	0.381

=== South Zone ===
Team	Pld	W	L	D	T	NR	Pts	Q
Hyderabad	4	3	0	1	0	0	36	2.342
Madras	4	3	0	1	0	0	33	2.253
Mysore	4	2	2	0	0	0	22	1.193
Andhra	4	0	3	1	0	0	7	0.473
Kerala	4	0	3	1	0	0	4	0.410

=== Central Zone ===
Team	Pld	W	L	D	T	NR	Pts	Q
Rajasthan	3	2	0	1	0	0	26	2.309
Madhya Pradesh	3	0	0	3	0	0	12	0.922
Uttar Pradesh	3	0	1	2	0	0	9	0.741
Vidarbha	3	0	1	2	0	0	9	0.693

== Knockout stage ==
Quarter-finals
22 Feb 1963 – Calcutta
Bengal	386 & 280
Hyderabad	361 & 121/8

Semi-finals
15 Feb 1963 – Delhi
Delhi	204 & 146
Rajasthan	220 & 133/5
2 Mar 1963 – Calcutta
Bengal	322 & 199
Bombay	552

Final
9 Mar 1963 – Jaipur
Rajasthan	196 & 336
Bombay	551/6d

=== Final ===
9–13 Mar 1963
Scorecard

Bombay	v	Rajasthan (H)
551/6 decl (117 overs); R. G. Nadkarni 219, Ramakant Desai 107, G. S. Ramchand 102; G. R. Sunderam 3/73		196 (55.2 overs); Kishan Rungta 64; Charlie Stayers 6/36
		336 (95 overs, follow on); Vijay Manjrekar 108; Charlie Stayers 3/85

Bombay won by an innings and 19 runs
Maharaja College Ground, Jaipur
Umpires: Sunil Banerjee and Samar Roy

- Rajasthan won the toss and elected to field

== Scorecards and averages ==
- CricketArchive
- ESPNcricinfo
