= Aleong =

Aleong is a surname. Notable people with the surname include:

- Aki Aleong (1934–2025), Trinidad and Tobago-born American actor and singer
- Andy Aleong (born 1943), Trinidad and Tobago cricketer and footballer
- Eddie Aleong (born 1937), Trinidad and Tobago cricketer
