= Jamiel =

Jamiel is a given name. Notable people with the given name include:

- Jamiel Ali (1941–1998), Trinidadian cricketer
- Jamiel Chagra (1944–2008), American drug trafficker, carpet salesman, and professional gambler
- Jamiel Hardware (born 1992), Jamaican footballer
