= Leonard Levy (disambiguation) =

Leonard W. Levy (1923–2006) was an American historian.

Leonard Levy may also refer to:

- Butch Levy (Leonard Bernard Levy, 1921–1999), American football player and professional wrestler
- Lenny Levy (Leonard Howard Levy, 1913–1993), American baseball player
- Leonard Levy (cricketer) (1939–2014), Jamaican cricketer
- J. Leonard Levy (1865–1917), English-American rabbi
