= Jerlani Robinson =

Dominican cricketer (born 1993)

Personal information
- Born: 23 December 1993 (age 32); Dominica
- Batting: Right-handed
- Role: Top-order batsman
- Relatives: Clem John (grandfather)

Domestic team information
- Years: Team
- 2015–2016: Windward Islands
- Source: CricketArchive, 1 April 2016

Jerlani Robinson (born 23 December 1993) is a Dominican cricketer who plays for the Windward Islands in West Indian domestic cricket. A right-handed top-order batsman, Robinson made his first-class debut for the Windwards in March 2015, playing against Guyana in the 2014–15 Regional Four Day Competition. He scored his maiden first-class half-century in February 2016, with an innings of 57 in the first innings of a match against Guyana. He followed this was 64 runs in the second innings of the next match, against Jamaica.

His grandfather Clem John played for Windward Islands in the 1960s.
