= Bertice Jacelon =

West Indian cricket umpire

Personal information
- Born: 1915
- Died: 13 August 2013 (aged 97–98)

Umpiring information
- Tests umpired: 2 (1962)
- Source: Cricinfo, 7 July 2013

Bertice Jacelon (1915 – 13 August 2013) was a West Indian cricket umpire. He stood in two Test matches in 1962. In all, he stood in seven first-class matches between 1960 and 1965, all of them at Queen's Park Oval in Port of Spain, Trinidad, except the first, which was the first first-class match to be played at Guaracara Park, Pointe-à-Pierre.

== See also ==
- List of Test cricket umpires
