= Edgar Gilbert Sporting Complex =

Cricket and football ground in Couva, Trinidad and Tobago

- Interactive map of Edgar Gilbert Sporting Complex

Ground information
- Location: Molyneux, Saint Kitts and Nevis
- Country: Saint Kitts and Nevis
- Coordinates: 17.3688°N 62.7533°W
- Establishment: c. 1993
- Capacity: 1,000
- End names
- Hospital Road End; Bamboo Road End

Team information
Trinidad and Tobago	(2000/01–2004/05)
West Indies B	(2001/02–2003/04)
- As of 6 March 2022; Source: Ground profile

The Edgar Gilbert Sporting Complex is a sports complex in Molyneux, Saint Kitts and Nevis.

== History ==
The complex is named in honour of Kittsian cricketer Edgar Gilbert, who was from Molyneux. The ground held its first major cricket match in January 2001, when the Leeward Islands played Jamaica in a first-class fixture in the 2000–01 Busta Cup. The following season West Indies B played Bangladesh A at the ground in the same competition, with both teams appearing as guests in the competition. Three further first-class matches were played there until February 2005, with the Leeward Islands appearing in two and West Indies B in one. The ground played host to two minor matches in 2011 which saw the Saint Kitts and Nevis cricket team play England Lions, with both matches drawn.

== Records ==
=== First-class ===
- Highest team total: 286 all out by Leeward Islands v Barbados, 2004–05
- Lowest team total: 85 all out by Kenya v West Indies B, 2003–04
- Highest individual innings: 105 by Ridley Jacobs for Barbados v Leeward Islands, 2004–05
- Best bowling in an innings: 7-70 by Omari Banks for Leeward Islands v Jamaica, 2000–01
- Best bowling in a match: 10-46 by Maurice Odumbe for Kenya v West Indies B, 2003–04

== See also ==
- List of cricket grounds in the West Indies
