= Indian cricket team in the West Indies in 1961–62 =

International cricket tour

Indian cricket team in West Indies in 1961–62
- Date: 16 February – 18 April 1962
- Location: (Cricket West Indies) West Indies
- Result: West Indies won 5-Test series 5–0
Teams
- West Indies: India
Captains
- Frank Worrell: Nawab of Pataudi, Jr.
Most runs
- Rohan Kanhai (500) Garfield Sobers (424) Easton McMorris (349): Polly Umrigar (445); Salim Durani (259); Rusi Surti (246)
Most wickets
- Wes Hall (27) Lance Gibbs (24) Garfield Sobers (23): Salim Durani (17); Bapu Nadkarni (9); Polly Umrigar (9)

The Indian cricket team toured the West Indies during the 1961–62 season to play a five-match Test series against the West Indies. The tour also included four tour matches against the West Indies' first-class sides. The West Indies won the Test series 5–0. In the total of 12 games that India played, they won two, lost six and drew four.

== Touring party ==
Nari Contractor, who was leading the India side during England's 1961–62 Asia tour, was again named captain on 11 January 1962 for the tour of the Caribbean by the BCCI. The squad was announced on 16 January. Ghulam Ahmed was named the tour manager.

The team members were:

- Nari Contractor, Gujarat, captain & opening batsman
- Mansoor Ali Khan Pataudi, Delhi, vice-captain & batsman
- Chandu Borde, Baroda, batsman & leg-spin bowler
- Ramakant Desai, Bombay, right-arm fast-medium bowler
- Salim Durani, Rajasthan, batsman & left-arm spin bowler
- Farokh Engineer, Bombay, batsman & wicket-keeper
- ML Jaisimha, Hyderabad, batsman & right-arm medium-pace bowler
- Budhi Kunderan, Railways, batsman & wicket-keeper
- Vijay Manjrekar, Rajasthan, batsman
- Vijay Mehra, Railways, opening batsman
- Bapu Nadkarni, Bombay, batsman & left-arm spin bowler
- EAS Prasanna, Mysore, off-break bowler
- Vasant Ranjane, Maharashtra, right-arm fast-medium bowler
- Dilip Sardesai, Bombay, opening batsman
- Rusi Surti, Gujarat, batsman & left-arm medium-pace bowler
- Polly Umrigar, Bombay, batsman and off-break bowler

== Tour matches ==
=== Two-day: Trinidad Colts v Indians ===
5–6 February 1962
Scorecard

Trinidad Colts	v	Indians
237/9d (78.4 overs); Andy Aleong 47; Rusi Surti 3/45 (17.4 overs)		317 (59.2 overs); Dilip Sardesai 118; Prince Bartholomew 4/72 (14 overs)
143/5 (42 overs); Noel Robinson 84; EAS Prasanna 2/38 (14 overs)

Match drawn
Gilbert Park, California, Trinidad and Tobago

- Indians won the toss and decided to field.

=== Four-day: Barbados v Indians ===
16–19 March 1962
Scorecard

Barbados	v	India
394 (123.3 overs); Anthony King 89; EAS Prasanna 4/158 (44 overs)		86 (32 overs); Farokh Engineer 36; Wes Hall 2/7 (5 overs)
		213 (64.2 overs); Vijay Manjrekar 100*; Charlie Griffith 3/20 (7 overs)

Barbados won by an innings and 95 runs
Kensington Oval, Bridgetown, Barbados
Umpires: Cortez Jordan and Jackie Roberts

- Barbados won the toss and elected to bat.

=== One-day: Tobago v Indians ===
31 March
Scorecard

Indians; 183	v	Tobago; 95
Chandu Borde 48; A Knox 4/84		A Knox 21; Chandu Borde 3/40

Indians won by 88 runs
Shaw Park, Scarborough, Tobago

- Tobago won the toss and decided to field.

== Test matches ==
=== 1st Test ===
16–20 February
Scorecard

India	v	West Indies
203 (73.3 overs); Rusi Surti 57; Charlie Stayers 3/65 (18 overs)		289 (113.2 overs); Jackie Hendriks 64; Salim Durani 4/82 (35.2 overs)
98 (50.5 overs); Chandu Borde 27; Garfield Sobers 4/22 (15 overs)		15/0 (1.4 overs); Conrad Hunte 10

West Indies won by 10 wickets
Queen's Park Oval, Port of Spain, Trinidad
Umpires: Bertice Jacelon and Cortez Jordan

- India won the toss and elected to bat.
- Jackie Hendriks and Charlie Stayers (WI) made their Test debuts.
- 18 February was a rest day.

=== 2nd Test ===
7–12 March
Scorecard

India	v	West Indies
395 (141 overs); Chandu Borde 93; Garfield Sobers 4/75 (39 overs)		631/8d (217.4 overs); Garfield Sobers 153; EAS Prasanna 3/122 (50 overs)
218 (84.5 overs); Farokh Engineer 40; Wes Hall 6/49 (20.5 overs)

West Indies won by an innings and 18 runs
Sabina Park, Kingston, Jamaica
Umpires: Reggie Cole and Owen Davies

- India won the toss and elected to bat.
- Ivor Mendonca and Willie Rodriguez (WI) made their Test debut.
- 11 March was a rest day.
- Wes Hall (WI) reached 100 wickets in Tests.

=== 3rd Test ===
23–28 March
Scorecard

India	v	West Indies
258 (89.1 overs); Salim Durani 48*; Wes Hall 3/64 (22 overs)		475 (241.3 overs); Joe Solomon 96; Polly Umrigar 2/48 (49 overs)
187 (185.3 overs); Dilip Sardesai 60; Lance Gibbs 8/38 (53.3 overs)

West Indies won by an innings and 30 runs
Kensington Oval, Bridgetown, Barbados
Umpires: Cortez Jordan and Jackie Roberts

- West Indies won the toss and elected to bat.
- David Allan (WI) made his Test debut.
- Mansoor Ali Khan Pataudi (Ind) became the youngest player to captain a side in Tests (at 21 years, 77 days), before Tatenda Taibu broke his record in 2004.
- 25 March was a rest day.

=== 4th Test ===
4–9 April
Scorecard

West Indies	v	India
444/9d (176 overs); Rohan Kanhai 139; Polly Umrigar 5/107 (56 overs)		197 (80.3 overs); Polly Umrigar 56; Wes Hall 5/20 (9 overs)
176/3 (101 overs); Easton McMorris 56; Salim Durani 3/64 (31 overs)		422 f/o (143.1 overs); Polly Umrigar 172; Lance Gibbs 4/112 (56.1 overs)

West Indies won by 7 wickets
Queen's Park Oval, Port of Spain, Trinidad
Umpires: Bertice Jacelon and Cortez Jordan

- West Indies won the toss and elected to bat.
- 8 April was a rest day.

=== 5th Test ===
13–18 April
scorecard

West Indies	v	India
253 (76.2 overs); Garfield Sobers 104; Vasant Ranjane 4/72 (19.2 overs)		178 (67.2 overs); Bapu Nadkarni 61; Lester King 5/46 (19 overs)
283 (88 overs); Frank Worrell 98; Salim Durani 3/48 (12 overs)		235 (104.5 overs); Polly Umrigar 60; Garfield Sobers 5/63 (32 overs)

West Indies won by 123 runs
Sabina Park, Kingston, Jamaica
Umpires: Owen Davies and Douglas Sang Hue

- West Indies won the toss and elected to bat.
- Lester King (WI) made his Test debut.
- 15 April was a rest day.
