= Owen Davies (umpire) =

West Indian cricket umpire

Personal information
- Born: 1914; Wales
- Died: 13 September 1978 (aged 63–64); Ballards Valley, St Mary, Jamaica

Umpiring information
- Tests umpired: 3 (1962–1965)
- Source: Cricinfo, 5 July 2013

Owen Davies (1914 – 13 September 1978) was a West Indian cricket umpire. He stood in three Test matches between 1962 and 1965.

Davies was born in Wales and served in the Royal Air Force in the Second World War. After the war, he moved to Jamaica, where he spent the last 30 years of his life. He worked enthusiastically to promote cricket and cricket umpiring in Jamaica's rural areas, and was a member of the Jamaica Cricket Board of Control for some years. He umpired ten first-class matches in Jamaica, including three Tests, between 1954 and 1967. He was murdered by gunmen while sitting at home in St. Mary, Jamaica.

== See also ==
- List of Test cricket umpires
- Indian cricket team in West Indies in 1961–62
- Australian cricket team in West Indies in 1964–65
