= Maple Club =

Multi-sport club in Barbados

Team information
- Colors: Black and white
- Founded: 1958
- Home ground: Trent's

History
- BCA Division 1 wins: 1992

Maple Club is a multi-sport club in Barbados. Maple's cricket team play in the Barbados Cricket Association Division 1 championship. Maple is based in Holetown, Saint James with the home ground at Trents playing fields. The club emblem is the maple leaf. Its colours have always been black and white with the green maple leaf emblem. The club motto is Palmam qui meruit ferat (Let him who deserves it win the prize). Since its first official sport was football and it expected to participate in other sports during 1959 and beyond, it did not name any sport in its official name. The name "Maple Club" was preferred over "Holetown Club" so as to invite participation of youngsters from other nearby districts.

Maple Club was founded in 1958 by a group of young men, most of whom had been already members of the Holetown Methodist Men's Fellowship. The Reverend Kenneth G Swanston had been responsible for the formation of the Fellowship at the nearby Methodist Chapel, but when the Trents Social Centre was established in 1957, the Fellowship moved its meetings into the Centre. Thereafter, the young members who had played their various sports only at their respective schools and at the small, uneven Holetown Elementary School's play ground, invited retired Police Captain Eustace Simmons and former West Indies cricketer George Carew, both Holetown residents, to be the senior mentors of the young club.

At the inaugural meeting on 11 November 1958, Simmons became Founder President and Carew Founder Vice-President; first secretary was DaCosta Denny and Michael Simmons, son of the president, was elected first Treasurer. The first cricket captain was Luther Francis; first football captain was Michael Simmons and first netball captain was June Carew. Maple's first and only Patron was Hon. Ronald Tree who had been equerry to Sir Winston Churchill during World War II and who had built a home in Holetown immediately after the War. It was Tree who bought the four acre sugar cane field from Trents Plantation and gave it to the people of Holetown in perpetuity so that the "young men of the village could have somewhere to express themselves through sports".

Within five years of its founding Maple was dominant at ladies netball, at cricket and was climbing into the higher divisions of local football; it had also embarked on ladies field hockey. By 1964 Maple had produced professional cricketers in John Shepherd, (Kent and West Indies), Keith Boyce (Essex and West Indies), Wycliffe Phillips (Gloucestershire and Barbados), Glenroy Sealy (Scotland) and Malcolm McKenzie (Scotland). Maple also won the first limited overs cricket competition played in Barbados, the E. W. Swanton Cup, before limited overs became popular or official in the Caribbean.

The club celebrated its 50th anniversary in 2009.

Maple won the inaugural BCA Twenty20 competition in 2008 and went on to compete in the 2009 West Indies Players' Association Twenty20 Club Champions League in Trinidad. Their last Division 1 championship was in 1992.

Notable cricketers from Maple in recent years include Kemar Roach, Kirk Edwards and Barrington Yearwood.
