= Winston English =

Guyanese cricketer

Personal information
- Full name: Winston Alfred English
- Born: 13 September 1943 (age 83); Georgetown, British Guiana
- Batting: Right-handed
- Bowling: Left-arm fast
- Role: All-rounder

Domestic team information
- Years: Team
- 1966-67 to 1969-70: Guyana

Career statistics
Competition	First-class
Matches	12
Runs scored	479
Batting average	43.54
100s/50s	1/3
Top score	112
Balls bowled	2148
Wickets	27
Bowling average	33.92
5 wickets in innings	0
10 wickets in match	0
Best bowling	4/111
Catches/stumpings	8/–
- Source: Cricinfo, 7 July 2019

Winston Alfred English (born 13 September 1943) is a former Guyanese cricketer who played first-class cricket for Guyana from 1967 to 1970.

A middle-order batsman and fast bowler, English had a fine first-class debut when he took 4 for 111 against Barbados in the 1966–67 Shell Shield, including the wickets of the Test batsmen Seymour Nurse and Gary Sobers. He played in a team of young players for a West Indies President's XI in the opening first-class match of the English tour of the West Indies in 1967–68. He captained Guyana in the final match of the Shell Shield in 1968–69, scoring 112 and top-scoring for his team.

English played as the professional for Haslingden in the Lancashire League in 1969 and 1970. After playing two more matches for Guyana in 1969–70 he went to live in the USA.
