= Charlie Stayers =

West Indian cricketer

Personal information
- Full name: Sven Conrad Stayers
- Born: 9 June 1937; Georgetown, British Guiana
- Died: 6 January 2005 (aged 67); London, England
- Batting: Right-handed
- Bowling: Right-arm fast-medium

International information
- National side: West Indies
- Test debut: 16 February 1962 v India
- Last Test: 4 April 1962 v India

Domestic team information
- Years: Team
- 1958/59 to 1961/62: British Guiana
- 1962/63: Bombay

Career statistics
Competition	Test	First-class
Matches	4	17
Runs scored	58	485
Batting average	19.33	28.52
100s/50s	0/0	1/2
Top score	35*	120
Balls bowled	636	3,061
Wickets	9	68
Bowling average	40.44	26.10
5 wickets in innings	0	4
10 wickets in match	0	0
Best bowling	3/65	6/36
Catches/stumpings	0/–	3/–
- Source: ESPNcricinfo, 31 October 2022

Sven Conrad "Charlie" Stayers (9 June 1937 – 6 January 2005) was a Guyanese cricketer who played in four Test matches for West Indies in 1962.

== Life and career ==
Stayers was born in Georgetown in British Guiana, and attended St Stanislaus College there.

Stayers was a tall, loose-limbed right-arm fast bowler and useful right-handed batsman. He played domestic cricket for British Guiana from 1958 to 1961. On his first-class debut against the touring Pakistani team in 1957–58 he took five wickets. He was the most successful bowler in the inter-island tournament in 1961–62, when he took 22 wickets at an average of 18.22, and British Guiana won the tournament. In the victory over Barbados in the final he took 6 for 70 and 3 for 64 and made 83 in the first innings. He played his four Test matches later that season.

Stayers also played for Bombay in the 1962–63 Ranji Trophy season. He was one of four West Indian fast bowlers who played a season of domestic cricket in India in 1962–63 in order to give Indian batsmen more experience of playing fast bowling. He played in the West Zone team that won the Duleep Trophy, and took nine wickets in the final of the Ranji Trophy to help Bombay retain the title.

The Ranji Trophy final, in which he took his best figures, was Stayers' last first-class match. He spent the 1963 English season as the professional for Enfield in the Lancashire League, and stayed in England to study at university. He pursued a career in health management that took him to Nigeria, Uganda, the United States, and back to England, where he died in 2005, aged 67.
