= West Indian cricket team in England in 1966 =

International cricket tour

The West Indies cricket team toured England in the 1966 season to play a five-match Test series against England. West Indies won the series 3–1 with one match drawn.

The tour was arranged at shorter notice than usual following the big success of the 1963 tour, with touring teams from New Zealand and South Africa "doubling up" in the 1965 season so that the West Indies could be brought back sooner than scheduled.

== The West Indies team ==
The touring team was captained by Gary Sobers, with Conrad Hunte as the vice-captain. The team manager was the former West Indies Test captain Jeffrey Stollmeyer. The full side was:

- Gary Sobers, captain
- Conrad Hunte, vice-captain
- David Allan
- Rawle Brancker
- Basil Butcher
- Joey Carew
- Rudolph Cohen
- Lance Gibbs
- Charlie Griffith
- Wes Hall
- Jackie Hendriks
- David Holford
- Rohan Kanhai
- Peter Lashley
- Easton McMorris
- Seymour Nurse
- Joe Solomon

Twelve of the team had toured England on the 1963 tour. The newcomers were Brancker, Cohen, Hendriks, Holford and Lashley, and only Brancker, Cohen and Holford had not played Test cricket before the tour. Holford played in all five Tests on the tour but Brancker and Cohen did not appear in the Test series and never won a Test cap.

== Test series summary ==
=== First Test at Old Trafford, 2–4 June 1966 ===
2–4 June 1966
Scorecard

West Indies	v	England
484 (153.1 overs); GS Sobers 161 (241); FJ Titmus 5/83 (35 overs)		167 (74.1 overs); JM Parks 43 (114); LR Gibbs 5/37 (28.1 overs)
		277 (f/o) (108 overs); C Milburn 94 (136); LR Gibbs 5/69 (41 overs)

West Indies won by an innings and 40 runs
Old Trafford, Manchester
Umpires: JS Buller and CS Elliott

- West Indies won the toss and elected to bat.
- The match was scheduled for five days but completed in three.
- C Milburn (ENG), and DAJ Holford (WIN) made their Test debuts.

England's first three-day defeat since 1938 came about through dominant batting by the West Indies' captain and vice-captain, followed up by high quality spin on a receptive pitch. Hunte hit 135 out of 283 in five hours on the first day, and then Sobers took over with 161 in 248 minutes. England dropped several catches, including both century-makers, and of the bowlers only Fred Titmus, with five for 83, emerged with credit. England started badly, with Colin Milburn run out for a duck in his first Test innings, and only a late stand between Jim Parks and David Allen lasted long against the spin of Gibbs (5-37) and Holford (3–34 on his debut). In the follow-on, Milburn made a quick 94 with sixes off Hall and Gibbs, but of the other batsmen only Colin Cowdrey (69) coped with the spin of Gibbs and Sobers. Gibbs finished with five for 69, taking his match figures to 10 for 106.

=== Second Test at Lord's, 16–21 June 1966 ===
16–21 June 1966
Scorecard

West Indies	v	England
269 (94 overs); SM Nurse 64 (130); K Higgs 6/91 (33 overs)		355 (143.3 overs); TW Graveney 96 (233); WW Hall 4/106 (36 overs)
369/5d (133 overs); GS Sobers 163* (299); K Higgs 2/82 (34 overs)		197/4 (55 overs); C Milburn 126 (170); CC Griffith 2/43 (11 overs)

Match drawn
Lord's, London
Umpires: JS Buller and WFF Price

- West Indies won the toss and elected to bat.
- 19 June was taken as a rest day.
- BL D'Oliveira (ENG) made his Test debut.

One of the great partnerships of Test cricket took the match away from England after they appeared to be on the way to a straightforward victory. Sobers and Holford came together with West Indies just nine runs ahead with five second innings wickets down. In 320 minutes, they put on an unbeaten 274, with Sobers making 163 and Holford, in just his second Test, 105. Earlier sound batting by Butcher, Nurse and Sobers in West Indies's first innings middle order enabled a respectable total despite Higgs' six wickets for 91. England's reply relied on 96 from Tom Graveney, 91 from Jim Parks and 60 from Geoffrey Boycott. Basil D'Oliveira, in his first Test, was unluckily run out when a shot from Parks deflected on to the stumps at the bowler's end and Hall pulled a stump out. After Sobers' second innings declaration, England lost four quick wickets, but Milburn, in his second Test also, hit an unbeaten 126 and he and Graveney saw out time.

=== Third Test at Trent Bridge, 30 June–5 July 1966 ===
30 June–5 July 1966
Scorecard

West Indies	v	England
235 (90.4 overs); SM Nurse 93 (142); K Higgs 4/71 (25.4 overs)		325 (134.3 overs); TW Graveney 109 (233); GS Sobers 4/90 (49 overs)
482/5d (178 overs); BF Butcher 209* (416); K Higgs 3/109 (38 overs)		253 (108.3 overs); G Boycott 71 (163); CC Griffith 4/34 (13.3 overs)

West Indies won by 139 runs
Trent Bridge, Nottingham
Umpires: CS Elliott and A Jepson

- West Indies won the toss and elected to bat.
- 3 July was taken as a rest day.
- DL Underwood (ENG) made his Test debut.

As at Lord's, West Indies displayed second innings resilience in the face of a deficit, and this time took it through to victory. This time the hero was Butcher, whose unbeaten 209 was stretched across three consecutive century partnerships – 110 with Kanhai (63), 107 with Nurse (53) and then 173 with Sobers (94). Earlier, Nurse with 93 had alone offered forceful resistance in a first innings dominated by pace, though Lashley made a stubborn 49. England's lead was due largely to three players: Graveney (109) and Cowdrey (96) put on 169 after three wickets had gone for 13, and then D'Oliveira made 76 to shepherd the tail to a 90-run lead, sharing a last-wicket stand of 65 with Derek Underwood, who was making his debut. Sobers' declaration left England more than a full day to survive, and though Boycott made 71, including a six off Sobers, and D'Oliveira 54, the match ended with 85 minutes to spare.

=== Fourth Test at Headingley, 4–8 August 1966 ===
4–8 August 1966
Scorecard

West Indies	v	England
500/9d (164 overs); GS Sobers 174 (260); K Higgs 4/94 (43 overs)		240 (78.3 overs); BL D'Oliveira 88 (141); GS Sobers 5/41 (19.3 overs)
		205 (f/o) (71.1 overs); RW Barber 55 (102); LR Gibbs 6/39 (19 overs)

West Indies won by an innings and 55 runs
Headingley, Leeds
Umpires: JS Buller and CS Elliott
Player of the match: GS Sobers (WIN) won the awards for batsman and bowler of the match.

- West Indies won the toss and elected to bat.
- 7 August was taken as a rest day.
- The match was scheduled for five days but completed in four.

An overwhelming victory with more than a day to spare was built on a fifth wicket stand of 265 between Nurse, who made 137, and Sobers (174). England suffered from the West Indian pace attack – in Milburn's case literally so, for he was forced to retire hurt after a blow to the elbow. Not until D'Oliveira (88) and Higgs (49) came together at 83 for six was there resistance, and Sobers took five for 41. It was a similar story in the follow-on, with Bob Barber reaching 55 but otherwise only the injured Milburn passing 40. Gibbs took six for 39 and Sobers, mostly bowling spin, a further three to finish with match figures of eight for 80 to go with his 174.

=== Fifth Test at The Oval, 18–22 August 1966 ===
18–22 August 1966
Scorecard

West Indies	v	England
268 (97.5 overs); RB Kanhai 104 (217); RW Barber 3/49 (15 overs)		527 (199.5 overs); TW Graveney 165 (361); WW Hall 3/85 (31 overs)
225 (85.1 overs); SM Nurse 70 (121); JA Snow 3/40 (13 overs)

England won by an innings and 34 runs
The Oval, London
Umpires: JS Buller and CS Elliott

- West Indies won the toss and elected to bat.
- 21 August was taken as a rest day.
- The match was scheduled for five days but completed in four.
- DL Amiss (ENG) made his Test debut.

Wholesale changes to the England side, including a new captain in Brian Close, led to a smarter bowling and fielding performance, but England's victory was based on surprise batting contributions from lower order players. West Indies won the toss for the fifth time, but only Kanhai, with 104, and Sobers (81) prospered against a varied attack. England in turn slumped to 166 for seven before wicket-keeper John Murray joined Graveney. Together they put on 217 for the eighth wicket, with Graveney hitting 165 and Murray's 112 more than doubling his previous Test best. The ninth wicket fell at 399, but Higgs and Snow then scored maiden first-class 50s in a last wicket stand of 128, two short of the-then Test record. Butcher made a quick 60, but Sobers was out for a duck and though Nurse made 70, West Indies were all out with more than a day-and-a-half to spare.

== Other matches ==
The West Indians played 22 other first-class matches in addition to the Tests, winning five, losing three and drawing 14. Their wins were against Cambridge University, Derbyshire, Kent, Warwickshire and Leicestershire. They lost to Sussex, Northamptonshire and T. N. Pearce's XI. Including the Tests, their record was eight wins, four defeats and 15 draws. They also played six one-day matches and one two-day match, which were not first-class; of these they won five, lost one and drew one.

== See also ==
- Playfair Cricket Annual, 1967 edition
- Wisden Cricketers' Almanack, 1967 edition
