= British Caribbean Football Association =

- Founded: 20 January 1957
- FIFA affiliation: N/A
- President: (Trinidad and Tobago) Ken Galt

The British Caribbean Football Association were a football association formed in January 1957. The BCFA was formed having witnessed the success of the West Indies Cricket team in the 1950s and their defeat of England during the decade. The BCFA was not technically a West Indies team as players were also selected from British Guiana who were not members of the West Indies Federation

The six inaugural members were:

- Barbados (joined FIFA in 1968)
- British Guiana (joined FIFA in 1988 as Guyana)
- Grenada (joined FIFA in 1978)
- Jamaica (joined FIFA in 1962)
- St. Vincent and the Grenadines (joined FIFA in 1988)
- Trinidad and Tobago (joined FIFA in 1964)

None of the associated FA's were members of FIFA at the time of the formation of the BCFA.

== Crest ==
The British Caribbean Football Association supported a design competition and the winning crest was designed by Andy Worrell, a Trinidad oilfield worker.

The Jamaica Gleaner described the crest thus: "It show flags of the West Indies Nation and the Mother Country, along with tropical scenery, typical of Caribbean waters, palm trees, birds and sun. At the top are eleven stars which serve a double purpose—representing the eleven players of the team or the eleven territories in the Association including British Guiana. All this is bounded by a gold chain linking the territories in the Association. The competition was open to residents in the West Indies and British Guiana."

== Executive committee ==
On 20 January 1957, Trinidadian Football Association Chairman Ken Galt was nominated as President of the BCFA. The first Vice-President Jamaican Winston Meekes, then Jamaican Football Association president. The second Vice-President was the Dighton H. Ward of Barbados.

The Trinidad Football Association's Eric James was installed as General Secretary of the BCFA.

== England Tour of 1959 ==
The representative team embarked on a tour of England between August and November 1959. The BCFA team left from Port of Spain aboard the MV Willemstad on 17 August, and arrived in England on 30 August. They played in navy blue shirts with gold trim, and white shorts.

=== Squad ===
No.	Pos.	Player	Date of birth (age)	Caps	Club
	GK	(Trinidad and Tobago) Patrick Gomez	6 February 1930 (aged 29)		
	GK	(Trinidad and Tobago) Rawlins Baptiste			
		(Jamaica) Walter Chevannes			
		(Trinidad and Tobago) Tyrone de la Bastide	17 October 1938 (aged 20)		
		(Trinidad and Tobago) Willie Rodriguez	25 June 1934 (aged 25)		
		(British Guiana) Hubert Braithwaite			
		(Jamaica) Karl Largie			
		(British Guiana) Monty Hope			
		(Trinidad and Tobago) Noel Daniel			
		(Trinidad and Tobago) Doyle Griffith			
		(Trinidad and Tobago) Eddie Aleong	4 May 1937 (aged 22)		
		(Trinidad and Tobago) Len Leggard	19 January 1930 (aged 29)		
		(Jamaica) Ken East			
		(Jamaica) Owen Parker	21 September 1932 (aged 26)		
		(Jamaica) Syd Bartlett			
		(Jamaica) Anthony Hill			
		(British Guiana) George Green			
		(Trinidad and Tobago) Ron Gray	13 October 1939 (aged 19)		
		(Trinidad and Tobago) Alvin Corneal	13 October 1937 (aged 21)		
		(British Guiana) Compton Julian			
		(Barbados) Reginald Haynes	22 November 1931 (aged 27)		

Ages shown are at the time of the first game on the tour.

== Results ==
1 September 1959	Cornwall FA XI	1-0	British Caribbean	St Austell

3 September 1959	Cornwall FA XI	2-1	British Caribbean	Penzance
			Haynes

7 September 1959	Dorset FA XI	4-2	British Caribbean	Weymouth
			Parker; Bartlett

10 September 1959	Isthmian League XI	3-1	British Caribbean	London
			Gray

12 September 1959	Athenian League XI	7-2	British Caribbean	Wealdstone
			?

16 September 1959	Spalding United FC	0-3	British Caribbean	Spalding
			Parker; East; Haynes

19 September 1959	Wisbech Town FC	5-4	British Caribbean	Wisbech
			Gray; Parker; Parker; Julian

23 September 1959	King's Lynn FC	3-1	British Caribbean	King's Lynn
			Parker

25 September 1959	Ely City FC	1-2	British Caribbean	Ely
			Haynes; Corneal

30 September 1959	Newmarket Town FC	1-3	British Caribbean	Newmarket
			East; East; Parker

3 October 1959	Peterborough United FC	4-1	British Caribbean	Peterborough

7 October 1959	Barking FC	1-2	British Caribbean	Barking
			Corneal; Haynes

10 October 1959	Great Britain Olympic	7-2	British Caribbean	Ipswich
			Parker; Parker

12 October 1959	Bromsgrove Rovers FC	5-0	British Caribbean	Bromsgrove

14 October 1959	Crystal Palace FC	11-1	British Caribbean	London
			Noakes (o.g.)

17 October 1959	Pegasus AFC	3-1	British Caribbean	Oxford
			East

21 October 1959	Millwall FC	5-1	British Caribbean	London
			East

The overall tour record was: P17 W4 D0 L13 F27 A63.
