= Reggie Cole =

West Indian cricket umpire

Cricket information
- Role: Umpire

Umpiring information
- Tests umpired: 1 (1962)
- Source: Cricinfo, 5 July 2013

Reggie Cole is a former West Indian cricket umpire from Jamaica. He stood in one Test match, West Indies vs. India, in 1962. In all, he umpired 11 first-class matches, all of them in Kingston, Jamaica, between 1958 and 1972.

== See also ==
- List of Test cricket umpires
- Indian cricket team in West Indies in 1961–62
