= James Baird (footballer) =

Scottish footballer (born 1983)

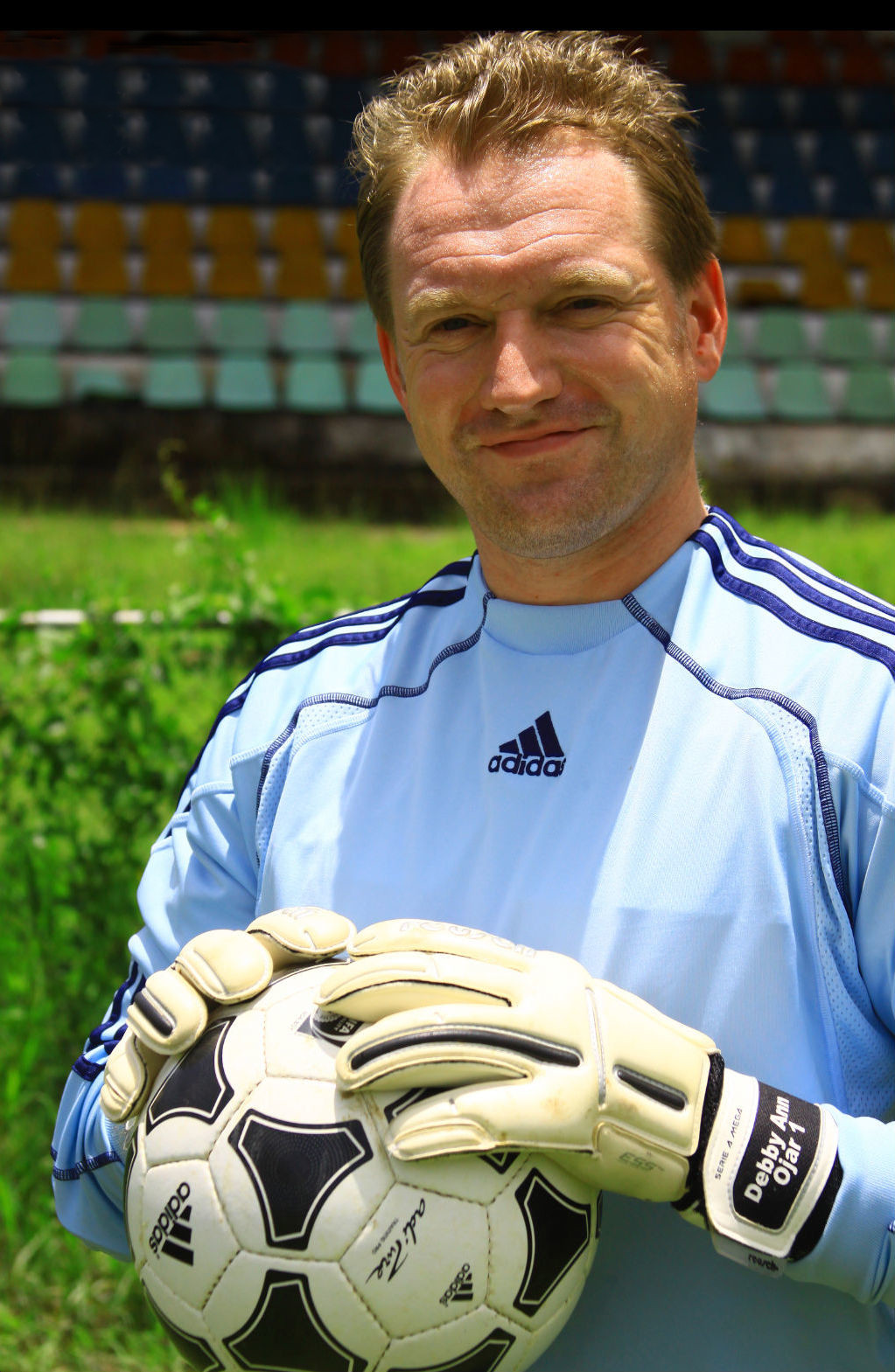

Personal information
- Date of birth: 25 May 1983 (age 43)
- Place of birth: Broxburn, Scotland
- Position: Goalkeeper

Team information
- Current team: British Virgin Islands women's national team (head coach)

Youth career
- 1998–1999: Livingston
- 1999–2001: Alloa Athletic

Senior career*
Years	Team	Apps	(Gls)
2002	Stenhousemuir	0	(0)
2003	TB	4	(0)
2004	Berwick Rangers	0	(0)
2005	Edinburgh United	4	(0)
2007	Tobago United	25	(0)
2008	MB	25	(0)
2009	AFC Totton	5	(0)
2010	North East Stars	0	(0)
2011–13	T & T Highlanders FC	44	(0)
2014–15	Galveston Pirate SC	0	(0)
2015	Galveston County Rangers Football Club	0	(0)
2016	Central F.C.	12	(0)
2017–?	Snæfell/UDN	1	(0)

International career
2001	Scotland U17	4	(0)
2001	Scotland U18	4	(0)
2009	BVI U23	3	(0)
2013	West Indies	0	(0)

Managerial career
- 2008–09: MB1905 Ladies
- 2011–12: T & T Highlanders FC (coach)
- 2013–14: Navassa Island FA (technical director)
- 2013–16: West indies FA (technical director)
- 2015–16: Guaya United FC (technical director)
- 2021–: Trinidad and Tobago women (goalkeeper coach)
- 2023–: British Virgin Islands women
- * Club domestic league appearances and goals

James Baird (born 25 May 1983) is a Scottish football coach and former professional footballer who played as a goalkeeper. He is currently the head coach for the British Virgin Islands women's national team.

== Playing career ==
After moving between a number of Scottish clubs, including Alloa Athletic, Faroese clubs and Trinidad and Tobago Professional Football League club Tobago United. He moved to Iceland in May 2017 to sign with Snæfell/UDN.

Baird made four appearances for Scotland U17 in 2001 and 2002.

== Coaching career ==
Baird trained with the British Virgin Islands national team and played for the under-23s in a small local tournament but after eligibility problems, decided against representing the senior side. There has been rumours of a return in 2016 for the Caribbean cup. Baird is also the Technical Director and goalkeeper for the West Indies Football Association.

All throughout Baird's career he has also coached whilst playing, as a young player helping out with his hometown club Broxburn Colts goalkeepers to working with Coerver as Gk coach. His first real coaching role was with MB1905 ladies team where he coached whilst playing for the club, The team did well getting promotion to the top woman's division. Baird has also coached T&T Highlanders, The West Indies National team and Guaya United in the Trinidad and Tobago Super league.

In summer 2021 Baird was appointed goalkeeper coach of the Trinidad and Tobago women's national team.
