= Wycliffe Phillips =

Barbadian cricketer (born 1941)

Personal information
- Full name: Roy Wycliffe Phillips
- Born: 8 April 1941 (age 85); Holders Hill, Saint James, Barbados
- Batting: Right-handed
- Bowling: Right-arm leg spin
- Role: Batsman

Domestic team information
- Years: Team
- 1966/67: Barbados
- 1968–1970: Gloucestershire
- FC debut: 9 February 1967 Barbados v Leeward Islands
- Last FC: 7 July 1970 Gloucestershire v Glamorgan
- LA debut: 18 May 1969 Gloucestershire v Lancashire
- Last LA: 30 August 1970 Gloucestershire v Essex

Career statistics
Competition	First-class	List A
Matches	18	21
Runs scored	18	538
Batting average	18.89	31.64
100s/50s	0/2	1/3
Top score	92	116*
Catches/stumpings	9/–	1/–
- Source: CricInfo, 18 September 2011

Roy Wycliffe Phillips (born 8 April 1941) is a Barbadian former cricketer. A right-hand batsman and occasional leg spin bowler, Phillips played his early cricket with Maple Club at Holetown.

He later played 18 first-class cricket matches for Barbados and later in England for Gloucestershire.
