= Bellairs Research Institute =

Marine biology research institute in Barbados

Coordinates: 13°11′31″N 59°38′26″W

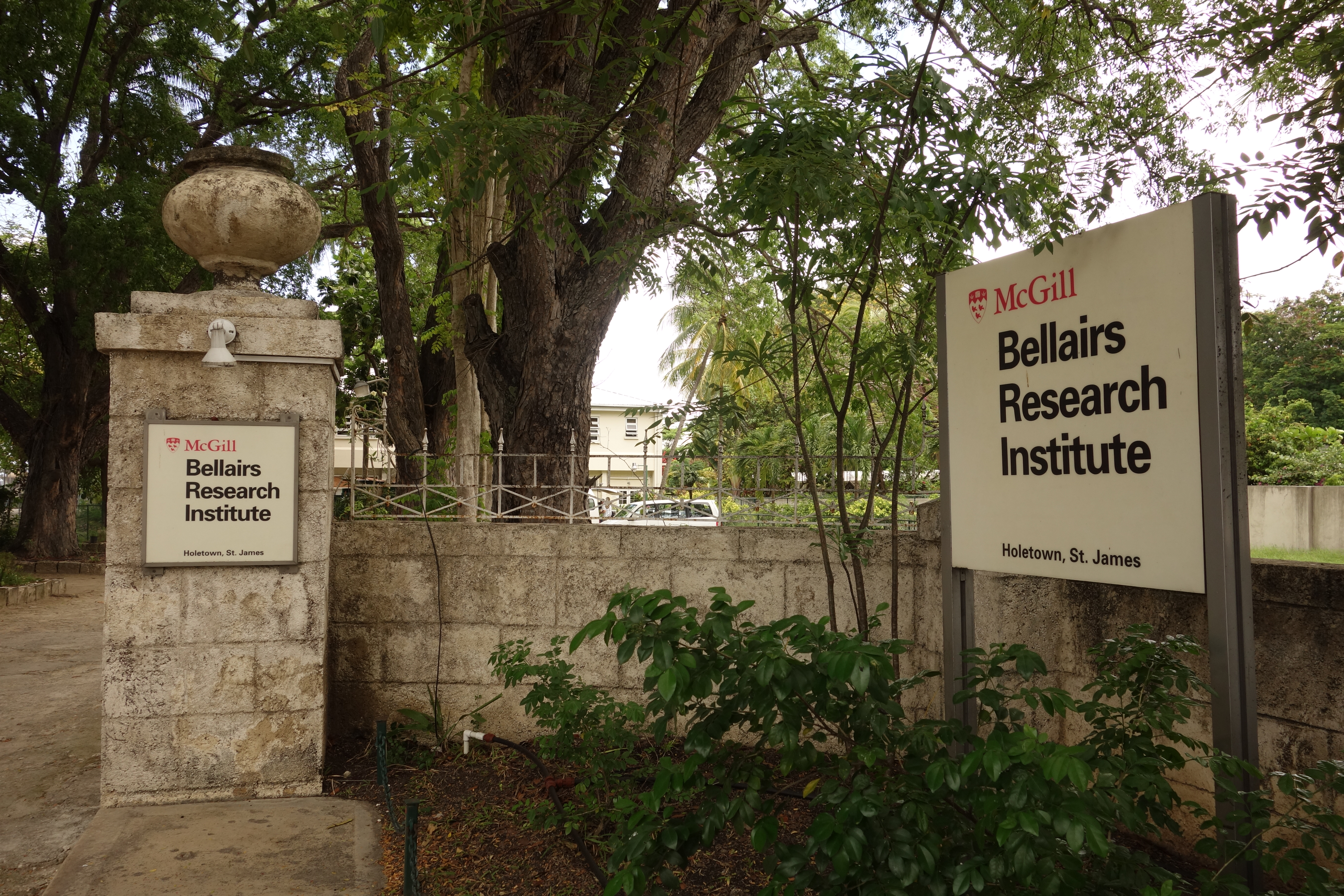
- Type: Field-station for McGill University.
- Established: 1954
- Affiliations: McGill University
- Location: Holetown, Saint James, Barbados
- Website: www.mcgill.ca/bellairs/

The Bellairs Research Institute, located on the Caribbean island of Barbados, was founded in 1954 as a marine biology field-station for McGill University. The main campus of McGill University is in Montreal, Quebec, Canada.

Bellairs' initial funding was from a bequest by British naval commander, Carlyon Bellairs, for whom the institute is named. The institute is used by both undergraduate and graduate students in a range of subjects, including marine science, geography, economics, engineering and international development studies.

Bellairs hosts numerous McGill University field-courses and workshops throughout the year, including Applied Tropical Ecology, Geography, and the Barbados Field Study Semester (BFSS). Bellairs also holds annual field courses from other universities from around the world including the University of Toronto (marine biology) and Western Michigan University (archeology).

== Location ==
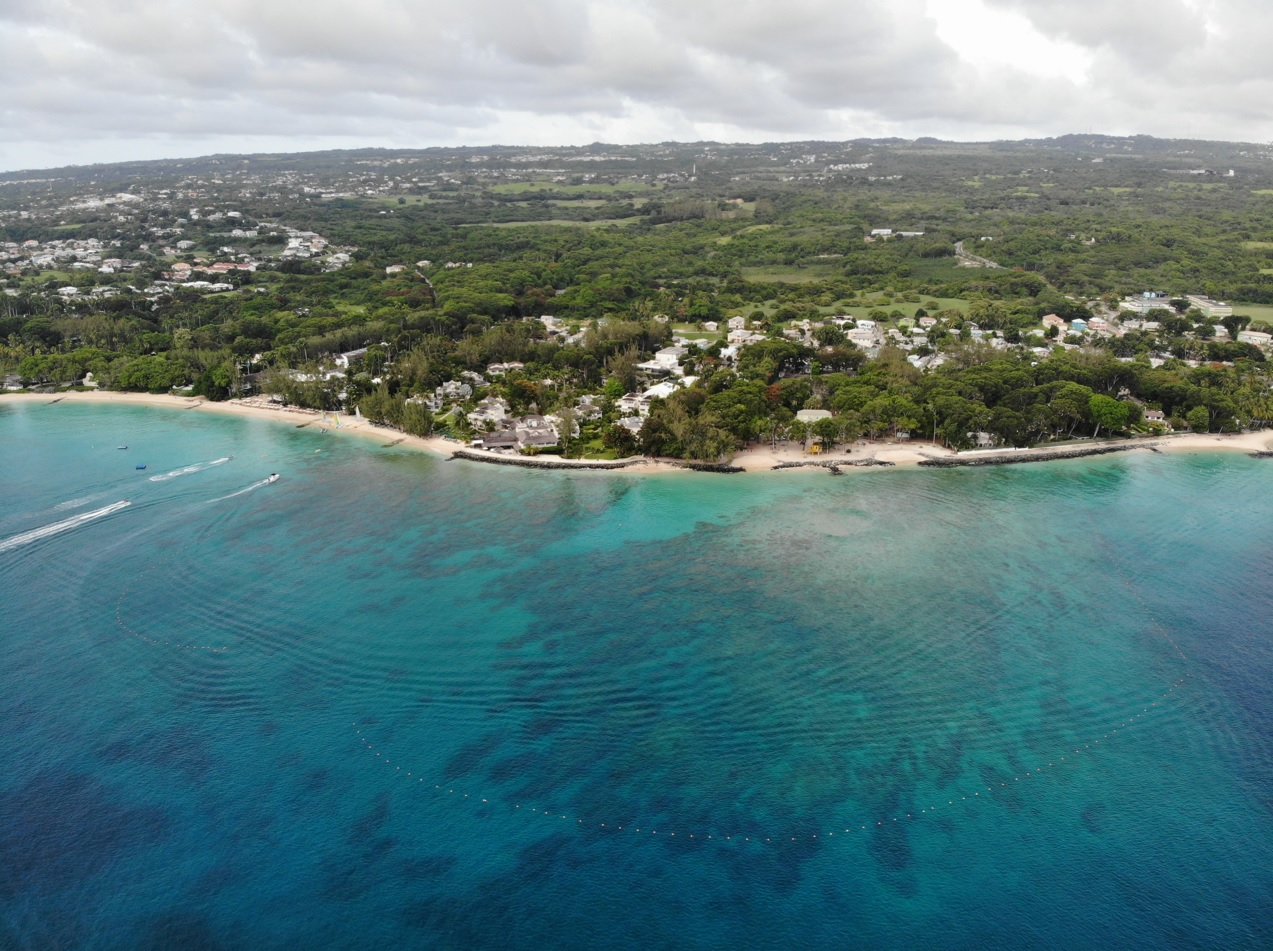
Folkestone Reef, just north of Holetown, Barbados

Bellairs is located just north of the historic town of Holetown, in the parish of St. James, on the west coast of Barbados. The facility is situated between the Folkestone Marine Park and Museum, to the south and the Coral Reef Club hotel to the north.

The shallow coral reef, and calm and clear water found on the west coast of Barbados, make Bellairs ideally suited to marine research. The fringing reef adjacent to the research institute is known as Folkestone Reef, although researchers at the institute typically refer to the two flame-shaped formations as North and South Bellairs. The southern reef extends approximately 900 feet (275 meters) from shore and the northern reef extends approximately 350 feet (107 meters) from shore.

Both reefs have extensive spur and groove formations along their seaward edge, which range in depth from about 15 to 25 feet (4.5 to 7.5 meters). These reefs were extensively mapped in 2018, using 3D modeling techniques, by Canadian company Reef Smart Guides, which was founded, and is managed by, former McGill University graduate students who studied marine biology at Bellairs Research Institute.

== Early history ==
The founding director of Bellairs was McGill University biologist, Dr. John Lewis, who developed an international reputation for his coral reef research in the 1950s and 60s, particularly on the biology and ecology of the Diadema and flying fish. Dr. Lewis was an early pioneer of scuba diving, which he used to collect data for his research.

== Later years ==
In 1982 Bellairs appointed its first Caribbean director, Barbadian Dr. Wayne Hunte, who helped develop the institute's reputation for applied and contract research work, both in Barbados and across the Caribbean region.

Under his directorship, the Marine Turtle Management Project was formed at Bellairs in 1987, with the aim of raising awareness, and promoting conservation of, sea turtles in Barbados. The project has evolved and expanded over the years and is now known as the Barbados Sea Turtle Project, and is managed from by Dr. Julia Horrocks (one of the original founders), based at the University of the West Indies.

In the early 2000s, Bellairs participated in testing the AQUA project based at the McGill University Faculty of Engineering. AQUA was the world's first robot capable of walking on land and swimming underwater.
