= Winston Mauricette =

Saint Lucian cricketer

Personal information
- Full name: Winston W. Mauricette
- Born: unknown Saint Lucia
- Role: Bowler

Domestic team information
- Years: Team
- 1965: Windward Islands
- 1966: Combined Islands
- Source: CricketArchive, 24 February 2016

Winston W. Mauricette (date of birth unknown) is a former Saint Lucian cricketer who played for the Windward Islands and Combined Islands in West Indian domestic cricket. He was the first Saint Lucian to play first-class cricket.

Mauricette made his first-class debut in May 1965, playing for the Windward Islands against the touring Australians. Later in the year, he played for the Windwards in a friendly fixture against the Leeward Islands, in which he took his maiden first-class wicket (that of Len Harris). He also made what was to be his highest first-class score, 20 not out from seven in the batting order. In March 1966, during the 1965–66 Shell Shield season, Mauricette played two games for the Combined Islands, against British Guiana and Trinidad and Tobago. The latter match was played at Victoria Park, Castries, his home ground. Mauricette took a single wicket against British Guiana and was wicketless in the other game, which was his last at first-class level.
