= Rudolph Cohen =

West Indian cricketer

Personal information
- Full name: Rudolph Alexander Cohen
- Born: 4 August 1942; Kingston, Jamaica
- Batting: Right-handed
- Bowling: Right-arm fast-medium

Domestic team information
- Years: Team
- 1963–64 to 1966–67: Jamaica

Career statistics
Competition	First-class
Matches	37
Runs scored	160
Batting average	7.27
100s/50s	0/0
Top score	32*
Balls bowled	4492
Wickets	82
Bowling average	31.80
5 wickets in innings	1
10 wickets in match	0
Best bowling	6/71
Catches/stumpings	15/–
- Source: Cricinfo, 28 June 2014

Rudolph Alexander Cohen (born 4 August 1942) is a former Jamaican cricketer who played first-class cricket from 1963 to 1967. He toured England in 1966 with the West Indian team but did not play Test cricket. He became a lawyer.

== Cricket career ==
A right-arm fast bowler, Cohen made his first-class debut for Jamaica in 1963–64. In that season and the next two he played 15 matches and took 27 wickets.

He played club cricket in England in 1965, taking 33 wickets at an average of 13.84 for Smethwick in the Birmingham and District League, and 17 wickets at 18.64 for Warwickshire Second XI. In 1965–66, when Jamaica finished at the bottom of the Shell Shield table without a win, he took 10 wickets at 41.90.

Cohen was not in the original selected team to tour England in 1966, but when Lester King had to withdraw, Cohen was selected to replace him. Aged 23, he was the youngest player in the team. The established pace trio of Wes Hall, Charlie Griffith and Gary Sobers played all five Tests, and Cohen played in 18 of the 22 other first-class matches, taking 40 wickets at 24.22, with his career-best innings figures of 6 for 71 against Sussex.

King returned to the team when the West Indians toured India in 1966–67. Cohen led the Jamaican bowling in the Shell Shield later that season, with 15 wickets at 31.86, but played no further first-class cricket thereafter.

== Later life ==
Cohen studied at the University of the West Indies, where he gained a Bachelor of Science degree in 1970. He went to the US, where he gained a master's degree in Public Administration at the University of Hartford in Connecticut and a Juris Doctor degree from the University of Connecticut. He then practised law in Connecticut.
