= Clem John =

Dominican cricketer and civil servant (born 1941)

Personal information
- Full name: Clement John
- Born: 29 March 1941 (age 85); Roseau, Dominica
- Batting: Right-handed
- Relatives: Jerlani Robinson (grandson)

Domestic team information
- Years: Team
- 1960–61 to 1968–69: Windward Islands
- 1961–62 to 1965–66: Combined Islands

Career statistics
Competition	First-class
Matches	15
Runs scored	751
Batting average	28.88
100s/50s	0/3
Top score	94
Balls bowled	24
Wickets	0
Bowling average	–
5 wickets in innings	–
10 wickets in match	–
Best bowling	–
Catches/stumpings	5/–
- Source: Cricinfo, 14 November 2020

Clement John (born 29 March 1941) is a former cricketer and senior civil servant from Dominica.

== Cricket career ==
Clem John was a middle-order batsman who played first-class cricket for the Windward Islands and the Combined Islands from 1961 to 1969. He was the Windward Islands’ best batsman in their match against the touring Australians in 1965, scoring 77 and 27.

He captained the Combined Islands in the inaugural season of the Shell Shield in 1965–66. After drawing their first two matches and losing their third, they beat Trinidad in their fourth match, John making 94, the highest score on either side in the match.

== Later life ==
After his playing career was over, John served as a selector for the Dominica cricket team for 10 years. A cricket stand at Windsor Park Stadium in Roseau is named in his honour – the Clem John and Kelleb Laurent Stand. He was awarded the Sisserou Award of Honour in 2002, and was inducted into the Dominica Cricket Hall of Fame in 2010.

John was Dominica’s Chief Elections Officer from 1982 to 2000 and was Chairman of the Justice Committee of Prisons and a member of the Public Service Appeal Board. He was an election observer for the Organization of American States and CARICOM and served on their supervisory bodies for several Caribbean elections.

The Windward Islands cricketer Jerlani Robinson is his grandson.
