= Andrew Clarke (Trinidadian cricketer) =

Trinidadian cricketer (born 1945)

Personal information
- Born: 9 February 1945 (age 81); Trinidad
- Source: Cricinfo, 28 November 2020

Andrew Clarke (born 9 February 1945) is a Trinidadian cricketer. He played in eight first-class matches for Trinidad and Tobago from 1966 to 1971.

== See also ==
- List of Trinidadian representative cricketers
