= Earl Cenac =

Saint Lucian cricketer (born 1947)

Personal information
- Born: 30 September 1947 (age 79); Saint Lucia
- Source: Cricinfo, 25 November 2020

Earl Cenac (born 30 September 1947) is a Saint Lucian cricketer. He played in three first-class matches for the Windward Islands from 1974 to 1982.

== See also ==
- List of Windward Islands first-class cricketers
