= Rawle Brancker =

Barbadian cricketer (1937–2021)

Personal information
- Full name: Rawle Cecil Brancker
- Born: 19 November 1937; Emmerton, St Michael, Barbados
- Died: 27 July 2021 (aged 83); Barbados
- Batting: Left-handed
- Bowling: Slow left-arm orthodox

Domestic team information
- Years: Team
- 1955-56 to 1969-70: Barbados

Career statistics
Competition	First-class	List A
Matches	47	3
Runs scored	1666	22
Batting average	27.31	22.00
100s/50s	5/2	0/0
Top score	135 not out	15 not out
Balls bowled	6866	120
Wickets	106	3
Bowling average	27.32	21.00
5 wickets in innings	4	0
10 wickets in match	0	n/a
Best bowling	7/78	2/10
Catches/stumpings	21/–	0/–
- Source: Cricket Archive, 4 March 2016

Rawle Cecil Brancker (19 November 1937 – 27 July 2021) was a Barbadian cricketer. A left-handed batsman and slow left-arm orthodox spin bowler, Brancker was an all rounder for Barbados between 1956 and 1970. He made 47 appearances in first class cricket, scoring 1,666 runs at an average of 27.31 with five centuries and taking 106 wickets at 27.32 runs per wicket.

In his six matches for Barbados in the 1964–65 and 1965–66 seasons Brancker scored 414 runs at 103.50 with three centuries, and took 18 wickets at 26.11, and was selected to tour England with the West Indian cricket team in England in 1966. He had occasional success as a bowler on the tour, taking seven Kent wickets for 73 runs, which remained the best bowling figures of his career. As a batsman he made a top score of only 37 on the tour, and he was not used for any of the Tests.

His top first-class score was 135 not out against Jamaica in 1966–67. He captained Barbados in the match against the MCC in 1967–68.

Brancker joined the West Indies 2007 Cricket World Cup Committee in 2003, but resigned in 2005 citing irreconcilable differences with officials Chris Dehring and Teddy Griffith. He was succeeded by Ken Gordon, West Indies Cricket Board president.

Brancker was a co-founder of the Barbados Lumber Company and the owner of Brancker's on Fontabelle, the hardware store in Bridgetown that he founded in 1974.
