= Burlin Saheed =

Guyanese cricketer (1942–2009)

Personal information
- Born: 3 January 1942; Berbice, British Guiana
- Died: 15 April 2009 (aged 67)
- Source: Cricinfo, 19 November 2020

Burlin Saheed (3 January 1942 – 15 April 2009) was a Guyanese cricketer. He played in three first-class matches for British Guiana from 1965 to 1973.

== See also ==
- List of Guyanese representative cricketers
