= Leonard Chambers =

Jamaican cricketer (born 1941)

Personal information
- Born: 31 December 1941 (age 84)
- Source: Cricinfo, 11 April 2017

Leonard Chambers (born 31 December 1941) is a Jamaican cricketer. He played eight first-class matches for Jamaica between 1965 and 1975.
