= Lawson Matthews =

Jamaican cricketer (born 1943)

Personal information
- Born: 18 March 1943 (age 83); Kingston, Jamaica
- Source: Cricinfo, 11 April 2017

Lawson Matthews (born 18 March 1943) is a Jamaican cricketer. He played three first-class matches for Jamaica between 1964 and 1966.
