= David Allan (cricketer) =

West Indian cricketer (born 1937)

Personal information
- Full name: David Walter Allan
- Born: 5 November 1937 (age 89); Hastings, Christ Church, Barbados
- Batting: Right-handed
- Role: Wicket-keeper

International information
- National side: West Indies

Domestic team information
- Years: Team
- 1955–56 to 1965–66: Barbados

Career statistics
Competition	Tests	First-class
Matches	5	54
Runs scored	75	764
Batting average	12.50	14.69
100s/50s	0/0	0/2
Top score	40*	56
Catches/stumpings	15/3	117/24
- Source: Cricinfo, 22 January 2022

David Walter Allan (born 5 November 1937) is a former West Indian cricketer who played in five Tests from 1962 to 1966. He was wicket-keeper in all five Tests.

Born in Hastings, Christ Church, Barbados, Allan played first-class cricket for Barbados from 1955–56 to 1965–66, and toured England with the West Indies teams in 1963 and 1966. He played two Tests against India in 1961–62, one against Australia in 1964–65, and two against England in 1966.
