= Herman Bennett (cricketer) =

Jamaican cricketer (born 1939)

Personal information
- Born: 22 December 1939 (age 86); Saint Catherine, Jamaica
- Source: Cricinfo, 11 April 2017

Herman Bennett (born 22 December 1939) is a Jamaican cricketer. He played eleven first-class matches for Jamaica between 1964 and 1970.
