= Kenneth Barnett =

Jamaican cricketer

Personal information
- Full name: Kenneth Barnett
- Source: Cricinfo, 11 April 2017

Kenneth Barnett is a Jamaican cricketer. He played four first-class matches for Jamaica between 1965 and 1966.
