= Cecil Martin (cricketer) =

Antiguan cricketer

Personal information
- Born: Antigua
- Died: 3 October 1980; New York, United States
- Source: Cricinfo, 24 November 2020

Cecil Martin (died 3 October 1980) was an Antiguan cricketer. He played in two first-class matches for the Leeward Islands in 1966/67 and 1969/70.

== See also ==
- List of Leeward Islands first-class cricketers
