= Erskine King =

Barbadian cricketer (born 1948)

Personal information
- Born: 1 September 1948 (age 78); Christ Church, Barbados
- Source: Cricinfo, 13 November 2020

Erskine King (born 1 September 1948) is a Barbadian cricketer. He played in two first-class matches for the Barbados cricket team in 1966/67 and 1968/69.

== See also ==
- List of Barbadian representative cricketers
