= Holetown =

- City
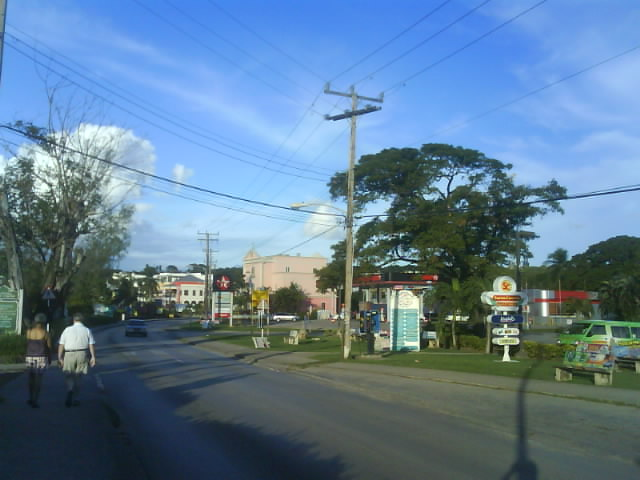
- Highway 1 in Holetown

- Location in Barbados
- Coordinates: 13°11′12″N 59°38′17″W
- Country: Barbados
- Parish: Saint James

Population (2012)
  - Total: 1,595
- Time zone: UTC-04:00 (AST)
- Area code: +1 246
- Website: Official website

Holetown (UN/LOCODE: BB HLT) is a small city located in the Caribbean island nation of Barbados. Holetown is located in the parish of Saint James on the sheltered west coast of the island.

== History ==
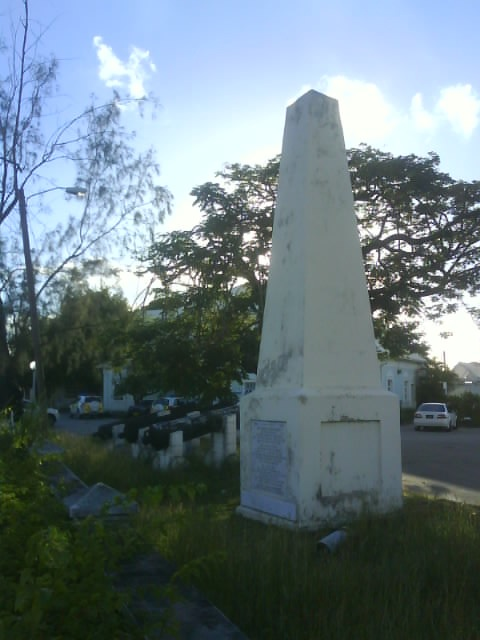
The Holetown Monument, commemorating initial English claim and later settlement of Barbados.

In 1625, Holetown (formerly as St. James Town) was the site of initial English settlement of Barbados (although Captain Cataline had previously landed to collect water in 1620). The envoy (led by John Powell) was blown off-course from South America to England and took the opportunity to claim the island for the Kingdom of England. Some personal possessions were left behind and the crew departed Holetown for England.

On 17 February 1627 the brother of Captain John Powell (Captain Henry Powell) aboard the "Olive Blossom" returned with his benefactor, Sir William Courteen, a Dutch-born English merchant trader, and fifty other shareholder settlers (and 10 captive negroes). A monument erected to commemorate this first landing on the island erroneously records the date as 1605. Since 1977, the town has also celebrated the Barbados Holetown Festival to commemorate this landing.

The name Holetown comes from the stream, The Hole, which provided a safe landing place for the settlers. Also sometimes called Saint James Town, the settlement was, until 1629, the island's only town. Holetown celebrates the founding of the first five plantations in Barbados, the first major fortification, the first place of Justice, and the first Governor's House. The town was also involved in the transatlantic trade with Bristol, London, and Boston, although this last was deemed illegal. After Lord Carlisle gained control of Barbados as a protectorate of The Crown, he decided to found his own settlement in the southern part of the island. Carlisle's move gave way to Bridgetown being settled along Carlisle Bay and a shift of the capital for the island to that location.

The Island's oldest church, St. James Parish Church, was erected here in 1628, a year after the first settlers landed.

The town is the home of McGill University's Bellairs Research Institute.

== Geography ==
Holetown is located at 13°11′00″N 59°39′00″W (13.183333, −59.65).

=== Boundary ===
Through Statutory Instrument (S.I) 1984 No. 141, Road Traffic Act, CAP. 295, ROAD TRAFFIC REGULATIONS, and under Schedule Section # 6: The Boundaries of Bridgetown, Speightstown, Holetown and Oistins are cited as follows: 3) "Holetown: The section of Highway 1 (formerly West Coast Rd.) from its junction with Lascelles Road at Limegrove Lifestyle Centre to its junction with Trents Road".

== Town twinning ==
Holetown has been twinned with:

- – Borough of Haringey, London, England, United Kingdom (since 2009)

== See also ==
- Maple Cricket Club
