= Lannel Hamilton =

Trinidadian footballer

Personal information
- Full name: Lannel Kebwe Hamilton
- Date of birth: 21 May 1993 (age 33)
- Place of birth: San Juan, Trinidad, Trinidad and Tobago
- Height: 1.89 m (6 ft 2 1/2 in)
- Position: Attacking midfielder

Youth career
- 2007–2009: St Anns Rangers FC
- 2009–2011: Joe Public

Senior career*
Years	Team	Apps	(Gls)
2011–2013	Joe Public	10	(1)
2015–2016	FC Alpe Adria	20	(9)
2017–2018	SV Holthausen	14	(1)
2018–2019	Stade Lavallois Mayenne Football Club	5	(0)

International career
2009–2010	Trinidad and Tobago U20	1	(0)
- * Club domestic league appearances and goals as of 25 August 2017

Lannel Kebwe Hamilton (born 21 May 1993) is a Trinidadian professional footballer who played as an attacking midfielder for Championnat National 3 club Stade Lavallois Mayenne Football Club

== Football career ==
Hamilton began his professional football career at the age of 18, with Joe Public in his native Trinidad and Tobago. Hamilton signed with Stade Lavallois Mayenne Football Club of the Championnat National 3 in May 2018.

== Club career ==
=== Joe Public FC ===
Hamilton played one season with Joe Public, where he had an okay performance with the club then received a huge opportunity to attend UEFA Football Camp in Austria where he was successful in landing a contract with Football Club Fc Alpe Adria.
