= Seymour Nurse =

Barbadian cricketer (1933–2019)

Personal information
- Full name: Seymour MacDonald Nurse
- Born: 10 November 1933; Jack-My-Nanny Gap, Black Rock, Saint Michael, Barbados
- Died: 6 May 2019 (aged 85); Bridgetown, Barbados
- Nickname: Casso
- Batting: Right-handed
- Bowling: Right-arm off-break
- Role: Batsman
- Relatives: Lee Nurse (great-nephew)

International information
- National side: West Indies
- Test debut (cap 110): 17 February 1960 v England
- Last Test: 13 March 1969 v New Zealand

Domestic team information
- Years: Team
- 1958–1971/72: Barbados

Career statistics
Competition	Test	FC	LA
Matches	29	141	7
Runs scored	2,523	9,489	246
Batting average	47.60	43.93	49.20
100s/50s	6/10	26/40	1/1
Top score	258	258	102*
Balls bowled	42	531	36
Wickets	0	12	2
Bowling average	–	32.41	20.50
5 wickets in innings	–	0	0
10 wickets in match	–	0	0
Best bowling	–	3/36	1/19
Catches/stumpings	21/–	116/–	3/–
- Source: CricketArchive, 12 July 2011

Seymour MacDonald Nurse (10 November 1933 – 6 May 2019) was a Barbadian cricketer. Nurse played 29 Test matches for the West Indies between 1960 and 1969. A powerfully built right-hand batsman and an aggressive, if somewhat impetuous, shotmaker, Nurse preferred to bat in the middle order but was often asked to open the batting. A relative latecomer to high-level cricket, Nurse's Test cricket career came to what many consider a premature end in 1969.

Nurse was a member of the famous Empire Cricket Club, and his cricketing mentor was club-mate Everton Weekes. He made his first-class cricket debut for Barbados in 1958. The following year he made a double century for Barbados against the touring English and quickly found himself called up for Test duties with the West Indies. Over the next five years, Nurse struggled to establish himself as a permanent fixture in the West Indies team. It was not until the West Indies toured England in 1966 that Nurse was able to perform consistently at international level.

Nurse retired from Test cricket at the peak of his powers, having just dominated the New Zealand bowlers in a three Test series. His last Test innings of 258 is still the highest score by a cricketer in his final Test innings. Nurse continued to play at club level and for Barbados for some years. He would later manage and coach the Barbados team and was the head coach of the Barbados National Sports Council. He was a Wisden Cricketer of the Year in 1967.

== Early life and career ==
Nurse was born on 10 November 1933 in Saint Michael, Barbados. From a humble background, Nurse was the son of a carpenter and the youngest of a family of two boys and two girls. His older brother Sinclair showed an early aptitude for cricket as a leg-spin bowler but did not carry on with the game. The younger Nurse went to school at St Stephen's Boys School where he excelled in both football and cricket. A severe leg injury brought an end to Nurse's football career along with advice from his father to "stay in cricket and quit football, otherwise you are on your own. Football in Barbados is too rough." Nurse was good academically, but, keen to start working for a living, he left school aged 16, a decision he would later regret.

Like many Barbadian cricketers from humble circumstances, Nurse started his cricket career in the Barbados Cricket League. He played for the Bay Street Boys' Club; the same club where Garfield Sobers and Conrad Hunte played as young men. His talent was soon noted and he progressed to the elite Barbados Cricket Association competition, joining the famous Empire Cricket Club. It was there he met Everton Weekes, a major influence in Nurse's life in cricket.

Nurse did not play for Barbados until he was 25, making his first-class cricket debut against Jamaica at Melbourne Oval in Kingston, Jamaica in July 1958. Nurse made 21 in the first innings and followed that by top-scoring with 35 in the second innings where Barbados were bowled out for 90—Barbados losing the match by 6 runs after forcing Jamaica to follow-on. In a second match against Jamaica later that month at Sabina Park, Nurse scored his maiden first-class century—128 not out. The following year, Nurse scored 213 against the touring England team, sharing a 306-run partnership with Gary Sobers.

== Playing style ==
Nurse credited his Empire teammate Everton Weekes for his success in cricket, telling Wisden that "Weekes made him into a first-class cricketer, a batsman able to get a line on the ball to know precisely where to hit it."

A powerfully built man, Nurse was a forceful, aggressive batsman who liked to play his shots early in an innings—sometimes to his detriment. His strokeplay was attractive, if sometimes unorthodox, and he was a "superb driver off the back foot". Later in his career he was able to graft when necessary.

Nurse bowled occasional off-spin and was a specialist close-to-the-wicket fielder.

== Test cricket ==
=== Debut and early struggles ===
Nurse made his Test cricket debut for the West Indies against England at Sabina Park in Jamaica in the third Test of the 1959–60 series in February 1960. He was called up into the team as a result of an ankle injury to Frank Worrell just before the match. Nurse had only one bat and that was held together with tape so before the match the England cricketer Trevor Bailey gave Nurse one of his bats.

Nurse came out to bat in the first innings when Easton McMorris was forced to retire hurt after being hit by repeated bouncers bowled by Fred Trueman and Brian Statham. Feeling confident after his earlier double century against the tourists Nurse hit Statham for a boundary from the first ball he faced. In what was described as a "sparkling" innings Nurse made 70 runs before lofting the England off spinner Ray Illingworth to mid on where he was caught by M. J. K. Smith. Commenting on the dismissal some years later, Nurse said, "Inexperience got the better of me. I could have had an easy hundred, but that's life." Nurse made 11 in the second innings but was omitted for the next Test when fellow Barbadian Clyde Walcott was recalled to the team.

Problems with injuries and a perception that his "temperament [was] not really suitable to the rigours of international cricket" saw Nurse in and out of the West Indies team in the early 1960s. The West Indies batting lineup at the time was strong. Nurse was competing for a place in the team against more accomplished cricketers such as Gary Sobers and Rohan Kanhai. In addition, more conventional batsmen such as Joe Solomon and Basil Butcher were often preferred by West Indies team selectors. Nurse was selected in the West Indies team to tour Australia in 1960-61 but struggled to find his best form; not selected for the first Test in Brisbane—the famous Tied Test—and again omitted for the final Test in Melbourne. He ended the tour on crutches having injured his ankle in play. After the Australia tour, Nurse began the first of his three seasons in England with Lancashire League team Ramsbottom.

It was not until the fourth Test of the series against India in 1962 that Nurse was given another opportunity at Test level. Nurse made only one run in the first innings and in the second innings was 46 not out at the end of the match—the West Indies won by 7 wickets. Nurse's next opportunity was with the West Indies team to England in 1963 but again he was affected by an injury that kept him lame for the greater part of the tour. He did not play a Test match but there was some qualified praise for his efforts in Wisden Cricketers' Almanack: "Nurse took a long time to justify the nice things claimed for him. He got himself out far too often through always being in too big a hurry to get on with the scoring, but in August he looked a very fine player." He was given another opportunity to succeed in the sub-continent with a Commonwealth XI tour of Pakistan in 1963. Nurse scored 369 runs in six matches on tour including 126 not out in the final match against Pakistan at Bangabandhu National Stadium.

=== Success ===
Nurse was finally given an extended period in the West Indies team in the home series against Australia in 1964-65. he was asked to open in the first Test at Sabina Park and failed, scoring 15 and 17. Left out for the second Test in Trinidad, he returned for the remaining Tests batting in the middle order. In the fourth Test on his home ground of Kensington Oval, Nurse finally broke through for his maiden Test century. The West Indies needed to respond to a very large first innings total set by Australia, featuring a record first-wicket partnership of 382 between Bob Simpson and Bill Lawry. Nurse responded on behalf of the West Indies with a quickfire double century—201 runs including 30 boundaries. This was followed by a duck in the second innings, but Nurse had now secured himself a permanent spot in the West Indies line-up.

Nurse played in a leading role in the 1966 West Indian tour of England. He scored 501 runs in the Test series at an average of 62.62, on both counts only surpassed by his captain, Sobers. In the third Test at Trent Bridge Nurse scored 93 in the first innings from a total of only 235. His reluctance to curb his aggressive batting saw him again miss out on a century in an innings described by Wisden as "a fine display" on a "fast true pitch which encouraged the pace bowlers". In the fourth Test at Headingley, Nurse scored his first century against England—"a most valuable innings of 137 out of 367 which covered five and three-quarter hours". Nurse's performances that season were highly praised with Wisden listing him as one of its Cricketers of the Year, declaring the "reliable consistency of Nurse was a great asset" to the West Indies team and "[m]oreover he always made his runs attractively".

[Nurse] may have got himself out at times by going for runs too soon but what a delight it was to witness the power and fluency of his strokes when things did go right. Anyone who saw his 93 in the first innings of the Nottingham Test will testify to that

— Wisden Cricketers' Almanack,

Nurse was part of the West Indies cricket team in India in 1966-67 but had limited opportunities, scoring 82 runs in the two Tests he played. When Conrad Hunte retired from cricket to pursue his interest in Moral Re-Armament, Nurse was asked to replace him opening the batting for the West Indies—a position for which he was not suited. During England's 1967–68 tour of the West Indies, after making 41 and 42 in the first Test at Port of Spain, Nurse was pushed down the batting order for the second Test. In the fourth Test at Queen's Park Oval Nurse—batting first wicket down—shared a partnership of 273 with Kanhai that put the West Indies in a winning position but a controversial declaration by West Indian captain Sobers helped England to a win by seven wickets. England won the series by one Test to nil. Wisden said of Nurse's efforts "Nurse had a good series, though he was not entirely happy as an opener."

=== Final matches and premature Test retirement ===
Nurse's last tour with the West Indies was to Australia and New Zealand in 1968-69. Nurse took some time to find his best form in Australia; like many of his teammates he struggled with John Gleeson's unorthodox bowling and Garth McKenzie's ability to move the ball early in the innings. In the fifth and final Test of the series at Sydney Nurse scored a second innings 137 but was unable to prevent Australia winning the match by 382 runs. During this series Nurse, annoyed by some events on the tour, advised the West Indies Cricket Board that he no longer wanted to be considered for selection in future West Indies teams. Sobers claimed that Nurse had told him earlier that "the West Indies will never throw him away, he will get rid of them first". Sobers, his captain, told Nurse he was a required player for the coming tour of England but Nurse felt he could not change his mind.

Nurse continued on to New Zealand where he was the "outstanding performer" for the West Indies, scoring 826 runs on the tour at an average of 91.8. In the first Test, Nurse made a chancy but exciting innings of 168; a "brilliantly sustained exhibition of strokeplay". Wisden stated that "although making many magnificent shots" Nurse had some luck as there were "many mis-hits which fell just clear of fieldsmen and three times all but played on". Nurse went public with his desire to leave international cricket at the end of the tour before the third and final Test at Lancaster Park. He finished his Test cricket career in Christchurch in style with an innings of 258—his highest score in Tests. Batting in very poor light Nurse "punished the New Zealand pace bowlers with superb drives off the back foot" in an innings described by Wisden as a "magnificent display of aggressive but responsible batting" featuring 35 fours and one six. Nurse's innings was the highest score by a cricketer in his final Test innings and his 558 runs at an average of 111.60 for the Test series is still a record for the highest average for a player's final Test series (minimum 3 Tests).

=== After Test retirement ===
After his Test cricket career finished, Nurse continued playing cricket in Barbados, both at club level and in the West Indies first-class cricket competition. His last first-class match was for Barbados against the touring New Zealanders in 1972 where he scored 76 and a duck. Watching him play in local cricket in Barbados in later years, Gary Sobers described his early retirement as "a waste". Another commentator claimed Nurse's retirement "on the threshold of a really great career" denied the West Indies of "a run maker who could have taken them unscathed into the 1970s".

Nurse managed and coached the Barbados team in the 1990s and was a respected member of the Barbados Cricket Association board. He also served as head coach of the Barbados National Sports Council.

My aim was always to play for Barbados and the West Indies, and having achieved this I was satisfied. Life has been good and I must say I'm happy, I played for my people and they showed me great respect.

— Seymour Nurse,

Nurse mentored Desmond Haynes.

== Character and personal life ==
Described by Sobers as a "proud man", Nurse nevertheless did have a lighter side. He acquired the nickname "Casso" from his West Indian teammates as a result of the interminable tall tales he told about his "hero", Casso the marathon runner. Wes Hall described Nurse as a "wonderful singer" and an excellent mimic with his best "performance" a take-off of Freddie and the Dreamers, complete with comic antics.

A keen footballer as a young man, Nurse played for Empire and made the national team. He helped found his own football club and in England in 1966 saw as many matches of the 1966 FIFA World Cup as he could.

Nurse was the father of twin daughters, born in 1966.

Nurse died at Queen Elizabeth Hospital, Bridgetown in May 2019 after an illness. He is survived by his twin daughters.
