= Sydney Jackman (cricketer) =

Guyanese cricketer (born 1945)

Personal information
- Born: 8 March 1945 (age 81); Berbice, British Guiana
- Source: Cricinfo, 19 November 2020

Sydney Jackman (born 8 March 1945) is a Guyanese cricketer. He played in four first-class matches for British Guiana in 1965/66.

== See also ==
- List of Guyanese representative cricketers
