= Edgar Gilbert (cricketer) =

Kittitian cricketer (1933–2017)

Personal information
- Born: 14 June 1933; St Kitts
- Died: July 2017
- Source: Cricinfo, 24 November 2020

Edgar Gilbert (14 June 1933 – July 2017) was a Kittitian cricketer. He played in eleven first-class matches for the Leeward Islands from 1961 to 1968. The Edgar Gilbert Sporting Complex in his home town of Molyneux is named in his honour.

== See also ==
- List of Leeward Islands first-class cricketers
