= Peter Lashley =

West Indian cricketer (1937–2023)

Personal information
- Full name: Patrick Douglas Lashley
- Born: 11 February 1937; Christ Church, Barbados
- Died: 4 September 2023 (aged 86); Barbados
- Batting: Left-handed
- Bowling: Right-arm medium

International information
- National side: West Indies
- Test debut (cap 112): 9 December 1960 v Australia
- Last Test: 4 August 1966 v England

Domestic team information
- Years: Team
- 1957–58 to 1974–75: Barbados

Career statistics
Competition	Test	FC
Matches	4	85
Runs scored	159	4932
Batting average	22.71	41.44
100s/50s	0/0	8/32
Top score	49	204
Balls bowled	18	2079
Wickets	1	27
Bowling average	1.00	35.48
5 wickets in innings	0	0
10 wickets in match	0	0
Best bowling	1/1	3/15
Catches/stumpings	4/–	66/–
- Source: Cricinfo, 4 September 2023

Patrick Douglas Lashley (11 February 1937 – 4 September 2023), known as Peter Lashley, was a Barbadian cricketer. He played four Tests for the West Indies in the 1960s.

== Career ==
A middle-order batsman who became an opener later in his career, Lashley played domestic cricket for Barbados from 1958 to 1975. His top score was 204 against Guyana in 1966-67.

Lashley toured Australia in 1960-61 and England in 1966 with the West Indian team, but was not able to establish himself in the Test side. Geoffrey Boycott stated that Lashley was the worst bowler ever to dismiss him in Test cricket – Boycott was his only Test victim, in the Fourth Test at Leeds in 1966.

== Death ==
Peter Lashley died in Barbados on 4 September 2023, at the age of 86.
