= Tony Howard =

West Indian cricketer (born 1946)

Personal information
- Full name: Anthony Bourne Howard
- Born: 27 August 1946 (age 80); Saint Michael, Barbados
- Batting: Left-handed
- Bowling: Right-arm offbreak

International information
- National side: West Indies
- Only Test (cap 143): 6 April 1972 v New Zealand

Domestic team information
- Years: Team
- 1965/66–1974/75: Barbados

Career statistics
Competition	Test	First-class
Matches	1	31
Runs scored	–	310
Batting average	–	10.00
100s/50s	–	0/0
Top score	–	42*
Balls bowled	372	5,694
Wickets	2	85
Bowling average	70.00	27.30
5 wickets in innings	0	2
10 wickets in match	0	0
Best bowling	2/140	5/46
Catches/stumpings	0/–	10/–
- Source: Cricinfo, 10 September 2022

Anthony Bourne Howard (born 27 August 1946) is a former West Indies international cricketer who played in one Test match in 1972, taking two wickets for 140 in a drawn match against New Zealand.

He played 31 first class matches from 1965–66 to 1974–75, representing the West Indies and Barbados, and took 85 wickets with his off spin. He retired at the age of 29 to pursue a career in business, but remained involved in cricket, and became manager of the Barbados team in 1998 before taking over the national team in March 2004.
