= Ferdie Harvey =

Jamaican cricketer

Personal information
- Full name: Eric Ferdinand Harvey
- Born: 16 December 1936 (age 89); Kingston, Jamaica
- Source: Cricinfo, 11 April 2017

Ferdie Harvey (born 16 December 1936) is a Jamaican cricketer. He played nine first-class matches for Jamaica between 1959 and 1967.
