= Kelleb Laurent =

Dominican cricketer, schoolteacher and politician

Personal information
- Full name: Kelleb John Laurent
- Born: 21 June 1941; Saint Joseph Parish, Dominica
- Died: 28 April 2010 (aged 68); Roseau, Dominica
- Batting: Right-handed
- Bowling: Right-arm off-spin

Domestic team information
- Years: Team
- 1964-65 to 1973: Windward Islands
- 1965-66 to 1969-70: Combined Islands

Career statistics
| Competition | First-class |
|---|---|
| Matches | 16 |
| Runs scored | 176 |
| Batting average | 8.80 |
| 100s/50s | 0/0 |
| Top score | 38 |
| Balls bowled | 2851 |
| Wickets | 48 |
| Bowling average | 26.14 |
| 5 wickets in innings | 3 |
| 10 wickets in match | 1 |
| Best bowling | 6/39 |
| Catches/stumpings | 9/– |
- Source: Cricinfo, 12 November 2020

Kelleb John Laurent (21 June 1941 – 28 April 2010) was a cricketer, schoolteacher and politician from Dominica.

== Career ==
Laurent was an off-spin bowler who played first-class cricket for the Windward Islands and the Combined Islands from 1965 to 1973. His best bowling and batting figures came in his last match, in 1973, in Windward Islands' victory over Leeward Islands, when he took 2 for 44 and 6 for 39 and made 38, Windward Islands' top score, in the first innings. He took his best match figures against Guyana in 1966-67: 6 for 76 and 5 for 94. Later he served as Dominica's national coach and selector for many years.

Laurent spent his working life as a school teacher in Dominica, including some years as a principal. After his death the St Joseph Junior School in St Joseph Parish was renamed the Kelleb John Laurent Primary School in honour of his contribution in the development of St Joseph and Dominica.

Laurent also served as a member of the House of Assembly of Dominica. He won the St Joseph constituency in the July 1980 General Elections and was appointed Parliamentary Secretary in the Ministry of Education, Health and Youth Affairs in the Dominica Freedom Party government led by Eugenia Charles. He also served on the St Joseph village council for many years.

He was awarded the Meritorious Service Award from the Dominica government in 2003. A cricket stand at Windsor Park Stadium in Roseau was named in his honour (the Clem John and Kelleb Laurent Stand) and he was inducted in the Dominica Hall of Fame for Sports. After his death in April 2010 the government declared a national day of mourning in his honour, on which the national flag on all public buildings was flown at half-mast.
