= Vincent Mayers =

Guyanese cricketer (1934–2013)

Personal information
- Born: 19 March 1934; Demerara, British Guiana
- Died: 5 December 2013 (aged 79)
- Source: ESPNcricinfo, 3 June 2016

Vincent Mayers (19 March 1934 – 5 December 2013) was a Guyanese cricketer. He played six first-class matches for British Guiana between 1964 and 1969.
