= Leonard Levy (cricketer) =

Jamaican cricketer (1939–2014)

Personal information
- Born: 8 May 1939; Kingston, Jamaica
- Died: 11 April 2014 (aged 74)
- Source: ESPNcricinfo, 13 May 2016

Leonard Levy (8 May 1939 – 11 April 2014) was a Jamaican cricketer. He played fifteen first-class matches for Jamaica between 1961 and 1974.
