= Renford Pinnock =

Jamaican cricketer (1937–2019)

Personal information
- Born: 26 September 1937; Spanish Town, Saint Catherine, Jamaica
- Died: 1 November 2019 (aged 82)
- Batting: Right-handed
- Role: Wicket-keeper

Domestic team information
- Years: Team
- 1963/64–1974/75: Jamaica

Career statistics
Competition	First-class	List A
Matches	44	1
Runs scored	2,662	35
Batting average	40.33	35.00
100s/50s	6/16	0/0
Top score	176	35
Catches/stumpings	26/5	1/0
- Source: Cricinfo, 7 April 2022

Renford Pinnock (26 September 1937 – 1 November 2019) was a Jamaican cricketer. He played 44 first-class matches for Jamaica between 1963 and 1975.

== Playing career ==
Born in Spanish Town, Saint Catherine Parish, Pinnock made his debut in 1964, scoring 68 and 106, for Jamaica against Barbados at Kensington Oval. He eventually attained acclaim as a stylish right-handed batsman who also featured as a proficient wicket-keeper. Pinnock's highest score in first-class cricket was 175 against Barbados at Kensington. With an eventual average of just over 40, Pinnock hit six centuries and 2,662 runs in 44 first-class matches.

== Subsequent career ==
At the end of his playing days, Pinnock worked as an umpire and coach for the Jamaica Cricket Association.

== Personal life ==
Pinnock was the father of four sons and two daughters.
