= Jamiel Ali =

Trinidadian cricketer

Personal information
- Born: 19 March 1941; St James, Trinidad
- Died: 30 October 1998 (aged 57); Trinidad
- Source: ESPNcricinfo, 14 November 2016

Jamiel Ali (19 March 1941 – 30 October 1998) was a Trinidadian cricketer. He played fifteen first-class matches for Trinidad and Tobago between 1960/61 and 1975/76.
