= Easton McMorris =

Jamaican cricketer (1935–2022)

Personal information
- Full name: Easton Dudley Ashley St John McMorris
- Born: 4 April 1935; Saint Andrew, Jamaica
- Died: 1 February 2022 (aged 86)
- Nickname: Bull
- Batting: Right-handed
- Bowling: Right-arm offbreak

International information
- National side: West Indies

Domestic team information
- Years: Team
- 1956–57 to 1971–72: Jamaica

Career statistics
Competition	Tests	First-class
Matches	13	95
Runs scored	564	5,906
Batting average	26.85	42.18
100s/50s	1/3	18/22
Top score	125	218
Balls bowled	0	114
Wickets	0	0
Bowling average	–	–
5 wickets in innings	0	0
10 wickets in match	0	0
Best bowling	–	–
Catches/stumpings	5/0	36/0
- Source: Cricinfo

Easton Dudley Ashley St John McMorris OD (4 April 1935 – 1 February 2022) was a West Indian cricketer who played in 13 Tests from 1958 to 1966. He attended Kingston College.

An opening batsman, McMorris scored a Test century against India at his home ground of Sabina Park in the 1961-62 series, adding 255 for the second wicket with Rohan Kanhai. This series was his most productive: in the four matches he played he scored 349 runs at an average of 58.16, with a lowest score of 37. He toured England with the West Indies team in 1963 and 1966 but was less successful on the slower, greener pitches. He scored 190 not out against Middlesex in 1963, but it took 400 minutes.

He was a heavy scorer for Jamaica, averaging over 60 in five domestic seasons, with a top score of 218 against Guyana in 1966-67. He captained Jamaica from 1967-68 until he retired after the 1971-72 season, including the short tour of England in 1970.

Jamaica awarded McMorris the Order of Distinction in 1972. He died on 1 February 2022, at the age of 86.
