= Eddie Aleong =

Trinidadian cricketer

Personal information
- Born: 4 May 1937 (age 89); Trinidad
- Source: ESPNcricinfo, 14 November 2016

Eddie Aleong (born 4 May 1937) is a Trinidadian former cricketer. He played four first-class matches for Trinidad and Tobago between 1959/60 and 1965/66.
