= Teddy Griffith =

Barbadian cricketer (born 1936)

Personal information
- Full name: Edward Hallam Cosmo Griffith
- Born: 18 March 1936 (age 90); Saint Michael, Barbados
- Relatives: Herman Griffith (father)
- Source: Cricinfo, 11 April 2017

Teddy Griffith (born 18 March 1936) is a Barbadian cricketer. He played twenty-five first-class matches for Barbados and Jamaica between 1953 and 1967.
