= Lester King (cricketer) =

West Indian cricketer

- King in 1968

Personal information
- Full name: Lester Anthony King
- Born: 27 February 1939; Saint Catherine, Jamaica
- Died: 9 July 1998 (aged 59); Kingston, Jamaica
- Batting: Right-handed
- Bowling: Right-arm fast

International information
- National side: West Indies
- Test debut: 13 April 1962 v India
- Last Test: 28 March 1968 v England

Domestic team information
- Years: Team
- 1961/62–1967/68: Jamaica
- 1962/63: Bengal

Career statistics
Competition	Test	First-class
Matches	2	62
Runs scored	41	1,404
Batting average	10.25	20.64
100s/50s	0/0	0/6
Top score	20	89
Balls bowled	476	9,742
Wickets	9	142
Bowling average	17.11	31.42
5 wickets in innings	1	3
10 wickets in match	0	0
Best bowling	5/46	5/46
Catches/stumpings	2/–	38/–
- Source: ESPNcricinfo, 31 October 2022

Lester Anthony King (27 February 1939 – 9 July 1998) was a West Indian international cricketer from Jamaica who played in two Test matches, one in 1962 and the other in 1968. On his debut, in April 1962, he took 5 for 46 in the first innings of the Fifth Test against India at Sabina Park, Kingston. He played first-class cricket for Jamaica from 1961 to 1968.

== Cricket career ==
King was a right-arm fast bowler who had played only two first-class matches before being selected to play Test cricket. Despite taking seven wickets in a West Indies victory in his first Test, he lost his place in the team to Charlie Griffith, who formed a powerful Test pace attack with Wes Hall and Garry Sobers throughout the 1960s. He toured England in 1963, India in 1966–67, and Australia and New Zealand in 1968–69, without playing a Test on any of his tours.

King was one of four West Indian fast bowlers who played a season of domestic cricket in India in 1962–63 in order to give Indian batsmen more experience of playing fast bowling. He played for Bengal and East Zone, taking 19 wickets in six matches with a best return of 5 for 146 in Bengal's victory in the Ranji Trophy quarter-final against Hyderabad. He played Lancashire League cricket for Rawtenstall in 1964 and 1965.

== See also ==
- List of West Indies cricketers who have taken five-wicket hauls on Test debut
