= 1997 New Year Honours =

1997 British awards from Queen Elizabeth

The New Year Honours 1997 were appointments by most of the Commonwealth realms of Queen Elizabeth II to various orders and honours to reward and highlight good works by citizens of those countries, and honorary ones to citizens of other countries. They were announced on 31 December 1996, to celebrate the year passed and mark the beginning of 1997 in the United Kingdom, New Zealand and the Cook Islands, the Bahamas, Grenada, Papua New Guinea, the Solomon Islands, Tuvalu, Saint Lucia, Saint Vincent and the Grenadines, Belize, Antigua and Barbuda, and Saint Christopher and Nevis.

The recipients of honours are displayed here as they were styled before their new honour, and arranged by honour, with classes (Knight, Knight Grand Cross, etc.) and then divisions (Military, Civil, etc.) as appropriate.

== United Kingdom ==
=== Life Peer ===
Baroness

- Dame Audrey Caroline Emerton, DBE, DL, Chief Officer, Care in the Community, and Co-Chairman, Medical Board, St. John Ambulance; Chairman, Brighton Health Care NHS Trust.

Baron

- Raj Kumar Bagri, CBE, Chairman, London Metal Exchange, and Chairman, MetDist Ltd.
- Sir Andrew Lloyd Webber, Composer.

=== Privy Counsellor ===
- David Michael Davis, MP, Member of Parliament for Boothferry and Minister of State, Foreign and Commonwealth Office.
- Eric Forth, MP, Member of Parliament for Mid Worcestershire and Minister of State, Department for Education and Employment.
- John Michael Jack, MP, Member of Parliament for Fylde and Financial Secretary to Her Majesty's Treasury.
- The Honourable Sir Angus James Bruce Ogilvy, KCVO, Trustee of The Prince's Trust and Chairman of The Prince's Youth Business Trust Advisory Council.
- Ann Noreen Widdecombe, MP, Member of Parliament for Maidstone and Minister of State, Home Office.

=== Knight Bachelor ===
- Alan Ayckbourn, CBE, Playwright. For services to The Theatre.
- Jack Mervyn Frank Baer. For services to the Art Trade.
- Nicholas Brian Baker, MP, Member of Parliament for Dorset North. For political service.
- Alec Victor Bedser, CBE. For services to Cricket.
- Thomas Leon Blundell, FRS. For services to the Biotechnology and Biological Sciences Research Council and to Scientific Research.
- Alan Peter Budd, Chief Economic Adviser to Her Majesty's Treasury and Head, Government Economic Service.
- Peter John Davis, Chairman, National Advisory Council for Education and Training Targets. For services to Training and to Industry.
- Simon James Day. For political and public service.
- Geoffrey James Dear, QPM, DL, Her Majesty's Inspector of Constabulary. For services to the Police.
- Richard Charles Hastings Eyre, CBE, Artistic Director, Royal National Theatre. For services to Drama.
- David Harrison, CBE, Master, Selwyn College, University of Cambridge. For services to Education and to Nuclear Safety.
- John Smith Harvie, CBE. For political and public service.
- Robert Baynes Horton, Chairman, Railtrack plc. For services to the Railway Industry.
- Gordon Minto Hourston, Chairman, Armed Forces' Pay Review Body. For services to the Armed Forces and to Industry.
- Michael Nicholas Howard Jenkins, OBE, Chairman, Futures and Options Association and the London Clearing House. For services to the Finance Industry.
- John Martin Kirby Laing, CBE, DL, Chairman, John Laing plc. For services to the Construction Industry.
- James Paul McCartney, MBE, Musician. For services to Music.
- Professor Samuel Roy Meadow. For services to Paediatrics and to the Royal College of Paediatrics and Child Health.
- Graeme David William Odgers, Chairman, Monopolies and Mergers Commission. For services to Industry.
- Herman George Ouseley, Chairman, Commission for Racial Equality. For services to Community Relations and Local Government.
- John Michael Pickard, Chairman, London Docklands Development Corporation. For services to Urban Regeneration.
- Brian Mansel Richards, CBE, Executive Chairman, Peptide Therapeutics Ltd. For services to the Biotechnology Industry.
- John David Rowland, Chairman, Lloyd's of London. For services to the Insurance Industry.
- Cyril David Townsend, MP, Member of Parliament for Bexleyheath. For political service.
- Professor Guenter Heinz Treitel, QC, lately Vinerian Professor of English Law, University of Oxford. For services to Law.
- The Honourable Miles Rawstron Walker, CBE, lately Chief Minister, Isle of Man Government. For services to the Government of the Isle of Man.
- Ronald Matthew Watson, CBE, Leader, Conservative Group, Association of Metropolitan Authorities. For services to Local Government.
- William Henry Weston Wells, Regional Chairman, South Thames NHS Executive. For services to Health Care.
- Raymond William Whitney, OBE, MP, Member of Parliament for Wycombe. For political service.
- John Basil Zochonis, DL. For political and public service.

=== Order of the Bath ===
==== Knight Grand Cross of the Order of the Bath (GCB) ====
Military Division

- General Sir Roger Neil Wheeler, KCB, CBE, ADC (Gen.), (475595), late The Royal Irish Regiment.

Civil Division

- Sir Anthony Michael William Battishill, KCB, Chairman, Board of Inland Revenue.

==== Knight Commander of the Order of the Bath (KCB) ====
Military Division

- Lieutenant General Samuel Cowan, CBE, (474845), late Royal Corps of Signals.
- Lieutenant General Hew William Royston Pike, DSO, MBE. (472599), late The Parachute Regiment.

Civil Division

- Richard Thomas James Wilson, CB, Permanent Under Secretary, Home Office.

==== Companion of the Order of the Bath (CB) ====
Military Division

Royal Navy

- Major General Simon James Pack, CBE.
- Surgeon Vice Admiral Anthony Leslie Revell, QHS.

Army

- Major General Jeremy Joseph Julian Phipps (472598), late The Queen's Own Hussars.
- Major General Michael Ian Eldon Scott, CBE, DSO. (467628), late Scots Guards.
- Major General Michael Alan Willcocks (476673), late Royal Regiment of Artillery.

Royal Air Force

- Air Vice-Marshal Geoffrey Wellesley Carleton.
- Air Vice Marshal Terence Brian Sherrington, OBE.

Civil Division

- Elizabeth Ann Chant, Chief Executive, Child Support Agency, Department of Social Security.
- George Michael Devereau, lately Chief Executive, Central Office of Information.
- David James Essery, Head of Group 1, Home Department, Scottish Office.
- David Gibson. For public service.
- Brian Richard Hawtin, lately Assistant Under Secretary (Home & Overseas), Ministry of Defence.
- David Alan Hogg, Deputy Treasury Solicitor, Treasury Solicitor's Department.
- James McQuaid, Chief Scientist, Health and Safety Executive, Department of the Environment.
- Arthur John Pryor, lately Head, Competition Policy Division, Department of Trade and Industry.
- Stephen Arthur Robson, Director, Finance Regulation and Industry Directorate, Her Majesty's Treasury.
- Terence Anthony Rochester, Chief Highway Engineer, the Highways Agency, Department of Transport.
- Professor Clive Harrod Smee, Chief Economic Adviser and Director of Operational Research, Department of Health.
- Christopher Camplin Wilcock, lately Head, Nuclear Power Privatisation Team, Department of Trade and Industry.
- Philip Wood, OBE, Director, Roads and Local Transport, Department of Transport.
- Joseph Roger Woolman, Legal Adviser and Solicitor, Ministry of Agriculture, Fisheries and Food.

Additional Member

- Robin Berry Janvrin, CVO, Deputy Private Secretary to The Queen.

=== Order of Saint Michael and Saint George ===
==== Knight Grand Cross of the Order of St Michael and St George (GCMG) ====
Diplomatic Service and Overseas List

- Sir (Arthur) John Coles, KCMG, Permanent Under-Secretary of State, Foreign and Commonwealth Office.

==== Knight Commander of the Order of St Michael and St George (KCMG) ====
Diplomatic Service and Overseas List

- The Honourable David Alwyn Gore-Booth, CMG, British High Commissioner, New Delhi.
- Michael Hastings Jay, CMG, HM Ambassador, Paris.

==== Companion of the Order of St Michael and St George (CMG) ====
- Roger George Bowers, OBE, Assistant Director General, The British Council.
- Lieutenant General Sir Michael John Dawson Walker, KCB, CBE (481887), late The Royal Anglian Regiment.

Diplomatic Service and Overseas List

- Major General Patrick Guy Brooking, CB, MBE. For services to UK-German relations in Berlin.
- Anthony Joyce Cary, Counsellor, Foreign and Commonwealth Office.
- John-Donovan Nelson dalla Rosa Clibborn, Counsellor, Foreign and Commonwealth Office.
- Antony Ford, lately Counsellor, Foreign and Commonwealth Office.
- Maureen Elizabeth MacGlashan, HM Ambassador, Holy See.
- David Trulock Ricks, OBE. lately Director, British Council, France.
- Hilary Nicholas Hugh Synnott, lately Minister, British High Commission, New Delhi.

=== Royal Victorian Order ===
==== Knight Grand Cross of the Royal Victorian Order (GCVO) ====
- Captain Sir Alastair Sturgis Aird, KCVO, Private Secretary and Comptroller to Queen Elizabeth The Queen Mother.
- General Sir Geoffrey Richard Desmond Fitzpatrick, GCB, DSO, MBE, MC, Gold Stick.

==== Knight Commander of the Royal Victorian Order (KCVO) ====
- John Luke Lowther, CBE, Lord Lieutenant of Northamptonshire.

==== Commander of the Royal Victorian Order (CVO) ====
- The Lady Elizabeth Georgina Alice Cavendish, LVO, Extra Lady in Waiting to The Princess Margaret, Countess of Snowdon.
- Richard Byron Caws, CBE, lately Crown Estate Commissioner.
- Philip Stephen Gilbert, OBE, Broadcaster.
- Sir George Trevor Holdsworth, Trustee, The Duke of Edinburgh's Award.

==== Lieutenant of the Royal Victorian Order (LVO) ====
- Hamish Blair, Senior Executive Officer, Scottish Office.
- Captain Robert Neil Blair, Royal Navy, Private Secretary to The Duke of York and to Princess Alexandra, the Honourable Lady Ogilvy.
- Laurence Albert Brown. For services to the Royal Collection.
- Donald Reeve Buttress, Surveyor of the Fabric, Westminster Abbey.
- Bernard Joseph Frahm, MVO. For services to the Crown on Royal Visits to New Zealand.
- Commander Thomas Dixon Laidlaw, QPM, Metropolitan Police.
- Leonora Mary, The Countess of Lichfield, Extra Lady in Waiting to The Princess Royal.
- Allan Arthur Percival, lately Press Secretary to The Prince of Wales.
- Alexander Hay Sutherland, Chief Publicity Officer, Scottish Office.

==== Member of the Royal Victorian Order (MVO) ====
- Christian Mary Bailey, Curator to The Prince of Wales.
- Frederick Booth, Chief Heraldic Painter, College of Arms.
- Ann Teresa Brown, MBE, lately British Overseas Trade Board.
- Matthew Nicholas Butler, lately Assistant Private Secretary to The Prince of Wales
- Pamela Margaret Clark, Deputy Registrar, Royal Archives, Windsor Castle.
- Claire Elizabeth Hunter-Craig, Secretary, Household of The Duke of Edinburgh.
- Reginald Elliott, Higher Executive Officer, Crown Estate, Windsor.
- Valerie Winifred Hampton, Personal Secretary to Princess Alexandra, the Honourable Lady Ogilvy.
- Chief Yeoman Warder Norman William Jackson, HM Tower of London.
- Alexander Masson, Head Gamekeeper, Balmoral Estate.
- John Ronald Pepper, lately of Collingwood & Company Limited.
- Inspector Stephen Lionel Robinson, Royalty and Diplomatic Protection Department, Metropolitan Police.
- Eileen Margaret Sly, lately the Westminster Abbey Trust.
- William Albert Stewart, Head Warden, Palace of Holyroodhouse.
- Prudence Sarah Sutcliffe, Assistant Curator of the Print Room, Windsor Castle.
- Lieutenant Colonel Patrick John Tabor, lately Equerry to The Prince of Wales.

==== Medal of the Royal Victorian Order (RVM) ====
In Silver

- John Nelson Hart, Gamekeeper, Sandringham Estate.
- Keith Hodson, Stud Hand, Royal Studs.
- Constable Anthony Claud James, Royalty and Diplomatic Protection Department, Metropolitan Police.
- John Trodden Kerr, Leading Palace Attendant, Windsor Castle.
- Leading Marine Engineering Mechanic (Mechanical) Andrew Kevin King, HM Yacht Britannia.
- Richard Clive Lines, Painter, Sandringham Estate.
- Musician William Huw Morris, HM Yacht Britannia.
- Sergeant Paul Andrew George Murrell, Norfolk Constabulary.
- Peter Leonard Riches, Foreman Gardener, Crown Estate, Windsor.
- Constable Mervyn John Shrubb, Royalty and Diplomatic Protection Department, Metropolitan Police.
- David Wetherill, Sacristan, St George's Chapel, Windsor Castle.
- John Herbert Willison, lately of Truefitt & Hill Limited.
- Acting Petty Officer Marine Engineering Mechanic (Electrical) Barry John Winstone, HM Yacht Britannia.

=== Order of the British Empire ===
==== Knight Grand Cross of the Order of the British Empire (GBE) ====
Civil Division

- Henry Shanks, The Right Honourable Baron Keith of Kinkel, lately Lord of Appeal in Ordinary.

==== Dame Commander of the Order of the British Empire (DBE) ====
Civil Division

- Rachael Mary Dyche, CBE. For political service.
- Deirdre Joan Hine, Chief Medical Officer, Welsh Office. For services to Medicine.
- Barbara Jean Lyon Mills, QC, Director of Public Prosecutions.
- Bridget Margaret Ogilvie, Director, Wellcome Trust. For services to Science.

Diplomatic Service and Overseas List

- The Honourable Rosanna Wong Yick-ming, JP. For public and community service, Hong Kong.

==== Knight Commander of the Order of the British Empire (KBE) ====
Military Division

- Vice Admiral Michael Antony Claes Moore, LVO.

Civil Division

- The Right Honourable Baron Thomas Alexander Fermor Hesketh. For political service.

==== Commander of the Order of the British Empire (CBE) ====
Military Division

Royal Navy

- Captain Paul Branscombe, OBE.
- Captain William Keith Hutchison.
- Captain Keith Frank Read.

Army

- Major General Cedric Norman George Delves, DSO, OBE, (485712), late The Devonshire and Dorset Regiment.
- Brigadier Kevin John Watson Goad, ADC, (472543), late Royal Army Ordnance Corps.
- Colonel (Acting Brigadier) Keith Skempton (487055), late The Cheshire Regiment.
- Colonel (Acting Brigadier) Albert Edward Whitley, MBE, (495259), late Corps of Royal Engineers.

Royal Air Force

- Group Captain Roger Hubert Beazley, AFC, (Retired).
- Group Captain George William Gibson, (Retired).
- Air Commodore Ernest William Tyack.

Civil Division

- John Edwin Adshead. For services to the National Training Awards and to Vocational Training.
- Nicholas Kenneth Alston, Assistant Secretary, Ministry of Defence.
- Michael Day Beaumont, OBE. For political and public service.
- Arthur John Armstrong Bell. For political and public service.
- Alastair John Bellingham, Professor of Haematology, King's College Hospital School of Medicine and Dentistry. For services to Medicine and to the Royal College of Pathologists.
- Professor Sushantha Kumar Bhattacharyya, Professor of Manufacturing Systems Engineering, University of Warwick. For services to Industry and to Technology.
- John David Stuart Brown, MBE. For political and public service.
- Christopher John Skidmore Burd. For services to the Forestry Industry.
- David Thomas Burke, Expert Special Adviser on the Environment, Department of the Environment.
- David Adam Cairns, Music Critic, The Sunday Times. For services to Music.
- David Wilkinson Cawthra, lately Director, Infrastructure Services Privatisation, British Railways Board. For services to the Railway Industry.
- Honor Mary Ruth Chapman, Partner, Jones Lang Wootton. For services to the Property Industry.
- William Herman MacKillop Clark, lately Head, Operational Re-organisation Division, Crown Prosecution Service.
- Owen J. D. Clarke, Controller, Scotland, Board of Inland Revenue.
- Stella Rosemary Clarke, DL. For services to the Community in Bristol.
- Betty St. Clair, The Honourable Mrs. Clay. For services to Guiding.
- John Brian Clayton, Chairman, Bridon plc. For services to Industry and to Export.
- Donald Thomas Younger Curry, Chairman, Meat and Livestock Commission. For services to Agriculture.
- William Wentworth Daniel. For services for Industrial Relations.
- Edward Charles Dart, Research and Development Director, Zeneca Seeds. For services to Industry and to Science.
- Edmund Leopold de Rothschild, TD. For charitable services.
- Nicholas Dampier Deakin. For services to the Commission on the Future of the Voluntary Sector.
- Anthony Albert Denton, Chairman, Noble Denton International Ltd. For services to Engineering.
- Roger Joseph Dickens, DL, Deputy U.K Senior Partner, KPMG. For services to Industry in the West Midlands.
- Judith Donovan, Chair, Bradford & District Training and Enterprise Council. For services to Training.
- Olga Lindholm Driver, Senior Partner, Aiking Driver Partnership. For services to ACAS and to Industrial Relations.
- Francis Cuthbert Duffy. For services to Architecture.
- Professor John Edwin Enderby, FRS, lately H. O. Wills Professor of Physics, University of Bristol. For services to Physics.
- Professor Henry John Evans. For services to Medical Research.
- James Stuart Fair, Chairman, Dundee Teaching Hospitals NHS Trust. For services to Health Care.
- Jonathan Farquharson, lately Legal Commissioner, Charity Commission.
- Thomas Hugh Francis Farrell, TD, DL, Pro-Chancellor and Chairman of Council, University of Hull. For services to Higher Education.
- David Geoffrey Nigel Filkin, Secretary, Association of District Councils. For services to Local Government.
- Stanley Fishman, President, Cinema Exhibitors' Association. For services to the Film Industry.
- Frederick Forsyth, Writer. For services to Literature.
- Michael John Ernest Frye, Chief Executive, B. Elliott plc. For services to Business.
- Professor Charles Albert Eric Goodhart, Professor of Banking and Finance, London School of Economics. For services to Monetary Economics.
- Peter James Grant, Chairman, Highlands and Islands Airports Ltd. For services to Industry.
- Paul Frederick Gribble. For political service.
- Ewan William Harper. For services to the Church of England.
- Derek James Harrington, Deputy Chairman and Chief Executive, Port of Felixstowe Ltd., and Director, Hutchison International Port Holdings. For services to the Ports Industry.
- Peregrine Andrew Morny Cavendish, Marquess of Hartington, lately Senior Steward of the Jockey Club and Chairman, British Horse Racing Board. For services to Horse Racing.
- David Hewitt. For services to the Community.
- Pamela Jean Hibbs, OBE, Chief Nurse and Director of Quality Assurance, Royal Hospitals NHS Trust, London. For services to Health Care.
- Arthur Derek Hill. For services to Art.
- Jenny Hughes, OBE, Chairman, Riverside Mental Health NHS Trust. For services to Health.
- Kenneth Wesley Jarrold, Director of Human and Corporate Resources, NHS Executive, Department of Health.
- George MacDonald Kennedy, Chairman, Smiths Industries Medical Systems. For services to the Health Care Industry and to Export.
- Cecil Gordon Knight, OBE, Headteacher, Small Heath School, Birmingham. For services to Education.
- Simon Timothy Lee. For political service.
- Thomas Peter Ruffell Laslett. For services to the Cambridge Group for the History of Population and Social Structure.
- Robert Noyes Lawton. For services to Agriculture in Wessex.
- Martyn John Dudley Lewis, Chair, Drive for Youth and Youthnet UK. For services to Young People and to the Hospice Movement.
- Francis David Lindley Loy, lately Chairman, Provincial Stipendiary Magistrates' Association.
- John Lumsden, Chief Executive, Motherwell Bridge Group. For services to the Engineering Industry.
- Thomas George Mackey. For services to Urban Regeneration.
- Colin Barry Manchip, lately Director, Immigration Service (Enforcement), Home Office.
- Brenda Mary McLaughlin. For services to the community and to Health Care.
- Elizabeth Mary McLoughlin, Head of Civilian Management (Policy), Ministry of Defence.
- James David Frederick Miller, Chairman, Scottish Qualification Authority. For services to Education.
- Dominic Charles Bernard Morris, lately Deputy Head, Policy Unit, 10 Downing Street.
- Richard Brian Mouatt, lately Chief Dental Officer, Department of Health.
- Professor John Joseph Murray, Professor of Child Dental Health, University of Newcastle. For services to Dental Health.
- Raymond Godfrey Owen, OBE. For public service in Wales, especially to the Police.
- George Hubbard Makgill, The Viscount of Oxfuird, Bt. For political service.
- David John Parker, Consultant Cardiac Surgeon, St George's Hospital, London. For services to Medicine.
- Roderick Sayers Paul, lately Chairman, British Water. For services to the Water Industry and to Export.
- Professor John Pitkeathly Ian Percy, Chairman, Accounts Commission for Scotland. For services to Accounting and to Local Authorities.
- Rupert Perry, President and Chief Executive Officer, EMI Europe. For services to the Recording Industry.
- Anna Bridget Plowden. For conservation services to Museums.
- Christopher Bernard Poole. For political service.
- Andrew Popat. For political service.
- David Edwin Potter, Chairman and Chief Executive, Psion plc. For services to the Manufacturing Industry.
- Bernard Albert Price, County Clerk and Chief Executive, Staffordshire County Council. For services to Local Government.
- Colonel John Richard George Putnam, TD. For services to the Territorial Auxiliary and Volunteer Reserve Association in South East England.
- John Anthony Ransford, lately Honorary Secretary, Association of Directors of Social Services. For services to Social Work.
- Steven Geoffrey Redgrave, MBE. For services to Rowing.
- Timothy John Rix. For services to Publishing.
- Dermot James Roaf. For political and public service.
- James Donald Robson, DL, Leader, Durham County Council. For services to Local Government.
- Kenneth Vivian Rose. For services to Journalism and to Literature.
- Francis Arthur David Rush, Head of Development and Staffing, Her Majesty's Board of Customs and Excise.
- Professor Anthony Seaton, Professor of Environmental and Occupational Medicine, University of Aberdeen and Honorary Consultant Physician, Lothian and Grampian Health Boards. For services to Medicine.
- Professor Robert Gray Robin Shanks. For services to Medicine.
- Mark Hebberton Sheldon. For services to the Legal Profession.
- Edward George Sherrin, Producer and Director. For services to Drama and to Broadcasting.
- Colin John Graham Shillington, MBE, DL. For services to the Dairy Industry and for public service.
- Sydney Frederick Shore, Chairman of Trustees, Independent Living Funds. For services to disabled people.
- James William Sinclair, Grade 5, Scottish Office.
- Roger Singleton, Senior Director, Barnardo's. For services to Young People.
- Baden Henry Skitt, BEM, QPM, Assistant Commissioner, Metropolitan Police. For services to the Police.
- Kevin Smith, Managing Director, Business Operations, British Aerospace plc. For services to the Defence Industry.
- Vera Stringer. For political service.
- Harry Taylor, Member, Board of Banking Supervision. For services to Banking.
- Brian Keith Thomas, Chairman, Cardiff Business Club and Mount Stuart Group. For services to Business and to the community in Wales.
- David Robin Bibby Thompson, TD, lately Deputy Chairman, Board of the Development Commission. For services to Business in Rural Areas.
- Rosemary Edith Robertson Thomson, OBE, lately Chairman, Magistrates' Association. For services to the Magistracy.
- John Tomlinson, Opera Singer. For services to Music.
- Hugh William Try, Chairman, Construction Industry Training Board. For services to the Construction Industry.
- Derek Tullett, President, Tullett & Tokyo Forex International Ltd. For services to the Finance Industry.
- Frank Vaughan, OBE, DL. For services to the NABC-Clubs for Young People.
- The Very Reverend James Leslie Weatherhead, lately Principal Clerk, General Assembly of the Church of Scotland, and Chairman, Church Leaders Forum. For services to Ecumenical Relations and for public service.
- Oswald Stephen Wheatley, Chairman, the Sports Council for Wales. For services to Sport.
- Professor John Gwynn Williams. For services to the National Library of Wales.
- Gregory Paul Winter. For services to Science.
- Andrew Wood. For public service.
- David Alan Wood, lately Head of Information Technology and Project Manager, Labour Market System Project, Department for Education and Employment.
- Anne Wright, Vice-Chancellor and Chief Executive, University of Sunderland. For services to Higher Education.

Diplomatic Service and Overseas List

- Anthony Au-Yeung Fu, OBE, JP, Commissioner of Inland Revenue, Hong Kong.
- Haider Hatim Tyebjee Barma, ISO, JP, Secretary for Transport, Hong Kong.
- Donald Leslie Brown, Counsellor (Management), New York.
- Kenneth Fang Hung, OBE, JP. For services to industry in Hong Kong.
- Michael Peter Frank Ingham, OBE. For services to British exports to Europe.
- Clive Lawson Jones, lately Secretary-General, European Energy Conferences.
- John Landerer, AM. For services to legal education and UK-Australian relations.
- Joseph Reynold O'Neal, OBE. For public and community service in the British Virgin Islands.

==== Officer of the Order of the British Empire (OBE) ====
Military Division

Royal Navy

- Commander Peter David Ambrose.
- Commander Charles Anthony Johnstone-Burt.
- Major Stephen John Duyland Bush, Royal Marines.
- Commander Michael John Channon.
- Commander Brian Paul Boxall-Hunt.
- Commander George McAleese.
- Commander Peter John Linstead-Smith.

Army

- Lieutenant Colonel Peter John Barrett (482686), Adjutant General's Corps (SPS).
- Lieutenant Colonel Brian McDonnell (509404), The Royal Anglian Regiment.
- Lieutenant Colonel George McGarr (508552), The Royal Logistic Corps.
- Lieutenant Colonel Brian Nutt (489575), Corps of Royal Electrical and Mechanical Engineers.
- Lieutenant Colonel Keith Henry Neville Prentice (488202), Royal Regiment of Artillery.
- Acting Colonel John David Reason (467319), Devonshire Army Cadet Force, Territorial Army.
- Lieutenant Colonel John David Sainsbury, TD, (453727), Royal Regiment of Artillery (Volunteers), Territorial Army.
- Lieutenant Colonel John Alexander Broome Salmon (486736), The Princess of Wales's Royal Regiment.
- Lieutenant Colonel John Alexander Thomson (496402) The Cheshire Regiment (Volunteers), Territorial Army.
- Lieutenant Colonel Philip Roy West (485857), Royal Regiment of Artillery.

Royal Air Force

- Wing Commander Michael Carl Barter (8026633).
- Wing Commander Walter Simon Erskine Crum (0608265).
- Wing Commander Nigel Kenneth Gillingham (5203514).
- Wing Commander Malcolm Kenneth Hinder (0207878), Royal Air Force Volunteer Reserve (Training).
- Wing Commander Michael John Jones (0685361).
- Wing Commander Brian David Longman (0609376).
- Wing Commander (now Group Captain) Christopher Hugh Moran, MVO, (5202768).
- Wing Commander Stephen Ronald Sims (5203336).
- Wing Commander Robert Adrian Williams (5204463).

Civil Division

- Mavis Ainsworth, lately Director, School of Cultural Studies, Sheffield Hallam University. For services to Education.
- Edward Aldridge, DL, Member, Moray Council. For services to Local Government.
- Graeme Yorkston Alexander, Chief Executive Officer, Devro International plc. For services to the Food Industry.
- Anthony Paul Allen, County Trading Standards Officer, East Sussex County Council. For services to Trading Standards and to Consumer Protection.
- Elizabeth Anne Allen, lately Director of Nursing, North West Anglia Healthcare Trust. For services to Health Care.
- Ian George Allen, Valuation Principal, Board of Inland Revenue.
- William Claude Allington. For political and public service.
- Professor Richard Edward Allsop, Professor of Transport Studies, University College London. For services to Traffic Management and Road Safety.
- John Victor Ronald Anderson. For political service.
- D. Michael Archer. For services to the Advisory Board for Redundant Churches.
- John D. Ault, Chair, Corporation of Yeovil College. For services to Education.
- David Bailey, Director of Development, London Underground. For services to Public Transport in London.
- Professor Andrew David Bain, Board Member, Scottish Enterprise. For services to the Scottish Economy.
- Edward John Meldrum Ball, lately Director, Oil Companies International Marine Forum. For services to Maritime Safety to the Environment.
- Helen Rae Bamber. For services to the Care of the Victims of Torture.
- Professor Howard Anthony Barnes, Senior Scientist, Unilever Research. For services to Science and Technology.
- Alison Mary Hore Bastard. For services to the Magistracy in South Devon.
- Elizabeth Mary Bavidge, Co-Chair, Women's National Commission. For services to Women's Issues.
- The Very Reverend Trevor Randall Beeson. For services to the Church of England, particularly as Dean of Winchester Cathedral.
- Hugh Richard Belshaw, lately Finance Director, Oxfam. For Charitable services.
- Professor Martin Biddle. For services to the Royal Commission on the Historical Monuments of England.
- Robin Edgar Birley, DL, Director, Vindolanda Trust. For services to Conservation.
- Cilla Black. For services to Entertainment.
- David Blackburn, Senior Management Pay Band 2, the Employment Service, Department for Education and Employment.
- Peter Kenneth Blair, Managing Director, Racal Research Ltd. For services to the Radar Industry.
- Victor Harold Blake, Founder Chairman, The London Underwriting Centre (LUC). For services to the Insurance Industry.
- Charles Conrad Blakey, RD, Chairman, Kent Probation Committee. For services to the Rehabilitation of Offenders.
- Ian James Blakey, Director General, British Iron and Steel Producers' Association. For services to Industry.
- Jennifer Blunt. For services to Medical Research Ethics.
- Christopher Arthur Booy, Chief Executive, Symonds Group Ltd. For services to the Ministry of Defence.
- Geoffrey Malcolm Bray, Chairman, Kazakh and Uzbek British Trade and Industry Councils. For services to Export.
- Patrick Brenan, Finance Director, Minories Finance Ltd. For services to Banking.
- Linda Broadhead, Senior Management Pay Band 2, the Employment Service, Department for Education and Employment.
- Rosemary Anne Brown, Member, Occupational Pensions Board. For services to Pensions Legislation.
- Barbara Kathleen Bryant, Grade 7, Department of Social Security.
- Keith Patrick Burke, Managing Director, Dana Spicer Europe Ltd., Dana Corporation. For services to Industry and to the Environment.
- David Burnett. For services to the Development and Application of Biochemistry to Health Care.
- William John Burnison. For public service.
- Derek Harold Calam, Member and Vice Chairman, British Pharmacopoeia Commission. For services to the Control of Medicines.
- Libby Campbell, Executive Director, Nursing and Quality, West Lothian NHS Trust. For services to Health Care.
- Dennis Duncan Carmichael, Honorary Treasurer, Lawn Tennis Association. For services to Lawn Tennis.
- Enid Castle, lately Principal, Cheltenham Ladies' College. For services to Education.
- Jonathan Joseph Chadwick, Secretary to the Imperial War Museum.
- Christopher Charlton, Director, Cromford Mill Project, Derbyshire. For services to Conservation.
- Professor Dennis Child. For services to Deaf People.
- Edward Samuel Childs, Executive Producer, Carlton UK Television. For services to Television Broadcasting.
- Brian James Clark, Principal Specialist Inspector, Health and Safety Executive, Department of the Environment.
- Harold Clarke, District Inspector, Board of Inland Revenue.
- Seamus Anthony Close. For public service.
- Christine Coates, Director, Coates Engineering (International Ltd). For services to Economic Development in North West England.
- Paulene Mary Collins. For services to Legal Education.
- Charles John Cooper, Principal Professional and Technology Officer, Ministry of Defence.
- Derek MacDonald Cooper. For services to Radio Broadcasting.
- Commodore George Richard Cooper, RD, Chief of Operations, Royal National Lifeboat Institution. For services to the RNLI.
- David Leonard Court. For services to Tourism in East Anglia.
- The Honourable Jurat John Alexander Gore Coutanche, lately Jurat, Royal Court of Jersey. For services to the community.
- Squadron Leader Robert Frederick Craig, Royal Air Force (Retd.), lately Grade 7, Ministry of Defence.
- Adrian Robert Currie, QFSM, Chief Fire Officer, Devon Fire and Rescue Service. For services to the Fire Service.
- Professor John Darby. For services to Community Relations.
- William Roch Davies, lately Director, Welsh Centre for International Affairs. For humanitarian services.
- Sally Dawn Ridley-Day. For political and public service.
- Peter Denley. For services to the Rehabilitation of Offenders.
- Brian Charles Dice. For services to British Waterways.
- James Dick, Director of Social Work Services, The Highland Council. For services to Social Work.
- Elizabeth Ann Dodsworth. For political service.
- Margaret Duddy. For political and public service.
- Andrew Nicholas Duff. For political service.
- Sister Mary Vincent Duggan. For services to Education.
- Helen Simpson Dunsmore. For services to Higher Education.
- Albert John Edwards, MBE, AFM. For services to 31 Squadron Royal Air Force Association.
- Henry Ashley Edwards, Consultant Anaesthetist, Ysbyty Gwynedd. For services to the Welsh Medical Committee.
- The Reverend John Gisborne Charteris Eldrid. For services to the Samaritans.
- Geoffrey Kenyon Elliott. For services to Forestry and to Wood Science.
- Robert William Elliott, Chairperson and Director, Wiltshire & Swindon Users' Network, and Chairperson, The Jumbulance Group. For services to disabled people in Wiltshire.
- David John Ellis, Grade 6, Ministry of Defence.
- Andrew James Erving, Grade 7, Foreign and Commonwealth Office.
- George Stanley Etchells, Member, Rotherham Metropolitan Borough Council. For services to Local Government.
- Eric Magnus Eunson, lately General Manager, Power System Development, National Grid Company plc. For services to the Electricity Industry.
- David Roger Evans. For services to Agriculture in Wales.
- Gwynne Howard Neill Evans, lately Grade 6, Department for Education and Employment.
- David Roger Evans. For services to Agriculture in Wales.
- John Ivan Ellis Farmer, Honorary Show Director, All England Jumping Course, Hickstead. For services to Show Jumping.
- William Harold Faulkner, Headteacher, Montrose Academy. For services to Education.
- David Alan Fawcett. For humanitarian services in the Caribbean.
- Ronald Paul Feeney, Governor 2, Her Majesty's Prison Stafford.
- Professor Christine Elizabeth Fell, Professor of Early English Studies, University of Nottingham. For services to Early English.
- John Ronald Fenner, Chairman, British Urban Regeneration Association. For services to Urban Regeneration.
- William James Ferguson, DL, lately Vice Chairman, Scottish Agricultural College. For services to Agriculture and to Education.
- Thelma Fisher, Director, National Family Mediation. For services to the community.
- David Fleming. For services to Museums.
- Douglas Munro Fleming, General Medical Practitioner, Birmingham. For services to Medicine.
- George Malcolm Fordy, Chairman and Chief Executive, FT Construction Group. For services to the Building Industry.
- Michael Hartley Foulds, Member, Association of Chartered Certified Accountants. For services to Accountancy.
- Major Roy Sutherland Fox. For services to the Soldiers', Sailors' and Airmen's Families Association in Suffolk.
- Stephen Giles Frankiss, Grade 6, Department of Transport.
- Jacqueline Dorothy Fuller, Officer in Charge, Board of Inland Revenue.
- Robert Alan Gailey. For services to Museums and Galleries.
- William Alistair Galston, lately Chief Inspector, Gaming Board of Great Britain.
- John Frederick Gibson, Secretary Scientific, Royal Society of Chemistry. For services to Chemistry.
- Thelma Joyce Gillen, Grade 7, Ministry of Defence.
- Michael John Goodman, Senior Group Leader, Pulse Power Research, AWE Aldermaston. For services to the Defence Industry.
- Gerard Graham. For services to the community in Tyne and Wear.
- William Grant, MBE. For services to Environmental Protection and to the Arts.
- Frederick Howard Green, Education Adviser, National Association of Independent and non-Maintained Schools. For services to Special Needs Education.
- Colin Ayton Greenhalgh, Principal, Hills Road Sixth Form College, Cambridge. For services to Education.
- Ian Gregg, Chairman, River Tweed Commissioners and Tweed Foundation. For services to Salmon and Trout Fishing.
- Vernon Charles Grove, Administrator, Wales and Chester Circuit, Lord Chancellor's Department.
- Rex Farrow Gyngell, DL. For political and public service.
- Arthur Barry Haines, Chair, Aerodynamics Group, Royal Aeronautical Society. For services to Aerodynamics.
- Eunice Hanna. For political service.
- Lieutenant Colonel Grattan Herbert Hart, DL. For services to the Royal British Legion in Sussex.
- Robert James Hasson, Assistant Controller (Collection and Personnel), Board of Inland Revenue.
- Anthony Roger Heath. For services to the Administration of Justice.
- Jennifer Mary Toresen, Lady Hemingford. For services to the community in Hemingford Abbots, Cambridgeshire and to the British Red Cross Society.
- Desmond Charles Henley, Embalmer. For services in the Aftermath of Disasters.
- Damon Graham Hill. For services to Motor Racing.
- John William Hoaen, Grade 7, Department of Trade and Industry.
- Margaret Edith Hobrough, Principal and Chief Executive, Godalming Sixth Form College, Surrey. For services to Education.
- Brigadier David Hendry Hodge, DL. For services to the Territorial Auxiliary and Volunteer Reserve Association in the North of England.
- The Reverend Roger Graham Holloway. For services to Export.
- John Hood. For services to Industry.
- John Trevor Hopkins, Headmaster, Bishop Stopford School, Kettering, Northamptonshire. For services to Education.
- David Christopher Hopkinson, lately Director of Housing, Great Grimsby Borough Council. For services to Housing and to Local Government.
- Christiana Valerie Horrocks, lately Grade 7, Department of Health.
- John Anthony Howley, QPM, lately Deputy Assistant Commissioner, Metropolitan Police. For services to the Police.
- Brian Joseph Hunt, Senior Professional and Technology Superintending Grade, Ministry of Defence.
- Frank George Henry Hunt, Grade 7, Department of Trade and Industry.
- Edward Graham Hutchinson. For charitable services.
- Jane Iris Isbister, lately Chairman, Forth Valley Health Board. For services to Health Care.
- Professor Kenneth Henderson Jack, Emeritus Professor, University of Newcastle-upon-Tyne, and Honorary Professor, University of Wales, Swansea. For services to Science.
- David Richard Jenkins, Finance Director, Sony Manufacturing Company (UK). For services to Industry in Wales.
- Frederick Albert Jennings, Chairman, Midlands Regional Fisheries Advisory Committee. For services to Fisheries Policy.
- Terence Maxfield Jobling, lately Veterinary Officer, Ministry of Agriculture, Fisheries and Food.
- David Lawrence Johnston, Director General, National Inspection Council for Electrical Installation Contracting. For services to Electrical Safety.
- David Henry Marshall Jones, lately Grade 6, the Benefits Agency, Department of Social Security.
- Derek Jones, lately Head, Libraries and Art Services, Richmond upon Thames. For services to Librarianship.
- Linda Edwina Jones, Principal Scientific Officer, the Defence Evaluation and Research Agency, Ministry of Defence.
- Leela Kapila, Consultant Paediatric Surgeon, University Hospital, Nottingham. For services to Medicine.
- Fergal Patrick Keane, BBC Foreign Correspondent. For services to Television Journalism.
- John Kelly. For services to Agriculture and to Banking.
- John Charles King, Chief Executive, Security Facilities Executive, Cabinet Office (Office of Public Service).
- John Kirkham, lately Grade 6, Ministry of Agriculture, Fisheries and Food.
- Glen Kirton. For services to Association Football, particularly Euro 96.
- Alice Elizabeth Audrey Lamb. For services to Education.
- Penelope Lambert. For services to the Board of Visitors Her Majesty's Prison Whitemoor.
- Michael John Leech, Principal, Stevenson College, Edinburgh. For services to Education.
- Gilberte-Marie Brunsdon-Lenaerts. For services to Anglo-Belgian Relations.
- Ann Molyneux Lewis, lately President, Royal Pharmaceutical Society of Great Britain. For services to the Pharmacy Profession.
- Kenneth Lewis, Chairman, Horizon NHS Trust. For services to Health Care.
- Timothy Lewis. For services to the Police.
- Ian Stanley Cash Linney. For services to the community in Nottinghamshire.
- James Logan. For services to Aviation.
- Angus Victor Peck MacKay, Physician Superintendent, Argyll and Bute Hospital. For services to Medicine.
- William Alexander Lee MacKay, Vice Chairman, Management and Human Resources Committee, Association of District Councils. For services to Local Government.
- Lieutenant Colonel John Pierce Margarson, TD. For services to Soldiers' Sailors' and Airmens' Families Association in Clwyd.
- Professor Mary Tara Marshall, Director, Dementia Services Development Centre at the University of Stirling. Lately Director, Age Concern Scotland. For services to Elderly People.
- Arthur Gordon Mason, Research Manager, Digi-Media Vision Ltd. For services to the Broadcasting Industry.
- Duncan Stuart Matthews, Head of Innovation and Growth Unit, National Westminster Bank plc. For services to Banking and to Industry.
- Kenneth McAlpine, DL. For services to the English Vineyard Association and to English Wine.
- James McIntosh McCabe, MBE. For political service.
- Andrew Duncan McCracken, lately Principal Officer, Howdenhall/St. Katharine's Centre, Edinburgh. For services to Child Care.
- David Alexander McCubbin. For services to people with learning disabilities.
- Professor Damien Gerard McDonnell, Senior Principal Scientific Officer, the Defence Evaluation and Research Agency, Ministry of Defence.
- James Dobbie McFarlane, lately Major Projects Director, Engineering Division, Nuclear Electric plc. For services to the Nuclear Electric Industry.
- William McGinnis, DL. For services to the Sheet Metal Industry and to Industry.
- Roger McGough, Poet. For services to Poetry.
- Helen Frances McGrath, President, National Union of Knitwear, Footwear and Apparel Trades. For services to Industrial Relations.
- Stuart McKenzie. For services to the Sea Cadet Corps, Southern Area.
- Donald McNeill, lately Chief Executive, South Ayrshire Hospitals NHS Trust. For services to Health Care.
- Professor David Alan Redpath Michie, Artist. For services to Art
- Jean Monro. For services to Interior Design.
- Charles Edward Moody, Deputy Chief Executive, Engineering and Marine Training Authority. For services to Training.
- Derek William Charles Morgan. For public service in Wales.
- Patricia Morris. For political service.
- John Robin Mulholland, Agricultural Estates Manager, Crown Estate Commissioners.
- Herbert Neville Nahapiet, Chief Executive, UK Detention Services. For services to Engineering and to the Construction Industry.
- Robert Livingston Nelson, Director, Dounreay, UKAEA. For services to the Nuclear Industry.
- Malcolm Terence Newman, Range E, Her Majesty's Treasury
- Joan Mary North. For political and public service
- Jean Nugent, Nursing Director, St. Helier Hospital, Carshalton, Surrey. For services to Health Care.
- Geoffrey James Osborne, lately Grade 7, Department of the Environment.
- Alfred David Owen, Trustee, Community Development Foundation. For services to the community in the West Midlands.
- Anthony Frederick Parker, lately Courts Administrator, Lord Chancellor's Department.
- Pamela Margaret Parker, Vice President, All England Women's Hockey Association. For services to Hockey.
- Alan Edward Parkinson, Officer in Charge, Board of Inland Revenue.
- David Romer Paton. For services to the community in Aberdeen.
- Professor Christopher Charles Payne, Chief Executive, Horticulture Research International. For services to Horticultural Research.
- Ann Philippa Pearce (Mrs Christie), Author. For services to Children's Literature.
- Anne Pegington, Secretary, Royal College of Nursing's Welsh Board. For services to Nursing in Wales.
- Howard Wesley Petch, Principal, Bishop Burton College. For services to Agricultural Education.
- George Redmond Pollard, Headteacher, St. Thomas More Catholic High School, Crewe, Cheshire. For services to Education.
- Anne Prior, lately Courts Administrator, Lord Chancellor's Department.
- Professor Vincent Bruce Proudfoot, lately General Secretary, Royal Society of Edinburgh. For services to Learning.
- Robert Harvey Quick, Professional and Technology Superintending Grade, Ministry of Defence.
- Captain David Lawson Rattray, Commanding Officer, Fishery Protection Vessel Norna.
- Norman Turnbull Renfrew, Chairman, Perth Housing Association. For services to the Housing Association Movement and to the community in Perth.
- Josef Lionel Rich, Chairman, General Dental Services Committee, British Dental Association. For services to Dentistry.
- Shirley Jane Richards, lately General Medical Practitioner, Exeter, Devon. For services to Medicine.
- John Matthew Richardson, Director, Lancashire Area West Training and Enterprise Council. For services to Education and Training.
- Edward Anthony Richmond. For political and public service.
- Anna Ritchie, Member, Ancient Monuments Board for Scotland. For services to Archaeology.
- Michael Collingwood Roberts. For services to Energy Efficiency.
- Stanley Desmond Roberts. For services to Medicine.
- Peter Daniel Rossdale. For services to Equine Veterinary Science.
- Peter Segger, Chairman, MD Organic Farm Foods (Wales) Ltd. For services to Organic Horticulture.
- Louisa Anne Service. For services to Music and to Young People.
- David Shalev. For services to Architecture.
- John Martin Shaw, Director of Planning and Transportation, Norfolk County Council. For services to Local Government.
- William Francis Sheridan, Head of International Policy, Forestry Commission.
- Francis Edward Shields, MBE, lately Chief Executive, National Federation of Young Farmers' Clubs. For services to the Young Farmers Club Movement.
- Ian Skipper. For charitable services.
- Brian William Smith, lately Head of Operations, Securities and Investments Board. For services to Financial Regulation.
- Clifford John Smith. For services to the Newspaper Industry and to the community in Lincolnshire.
- Dennis Alfred Smith, lately Network Director, Southern Division, Central Office of Information.
- John Stanley Walter Smith, Head of Corporate Services Group, Her Majesty's Board of Customs and Excise.
- Neil Durden-Smith. For charitable services.
- Ian Nelson Sneddon, Chairman, Central Scotland Committee for the Employment of People with Disabilities. For services to the employment of disabled people.
- Kenneth Speakman, lately Pollution Inspector, Environment Agency. For services to Environmental Protection.
- Francis Richard Stanhope. For services to the Royal Air Force Association.
- Robert Russell Steedman, lately Member, Royal Fine Art Commission for Scotland. For services to the Built Environment in Scotland.
- Susan Elizabeth Stockley, Chairman, National Executive of the National Federation of Women's Institutes. For services to the Women's Institute Movement.
- John Howard Stoner, Regional General Manager, National Rivers Authority (Welsh Region). For services to the Environment in Wales.
- Robert Thomas Dursley Stott. For services to the British Red Cross Society on the Isle of Man.
- June Street, Executive Manager, Dacorum Council for Voluntary Service. For services to the community.
- Richard Kenneth Swan. For services to Tourism.
- Geoffrey Trevor Theobald. For political and public service.
- David Geraint Price-Thomas, lately Under Secretary (Wales), Council of Welsh Districts. For services to Local Government in Wales.
- Joan Margaret Elizabeth Thompson, TD. For public service.
- Kenneth Trench, Chairman, Maxwell Pensioners' Action Group. For services to Pensions Legislation.
- Michael Victor Upson, TD, lately Grade 6, Foreign and Commonwealth Office.
- Derek Eustace Murray Walker, Director, Worldware. For services to Public Awareness of Aid Issues.
- Professor Herbert Wallace. For services to the community.
- Trevor Ward, lately Head of Aerodrome Standards Department, Civil Aviation Authority. For services to Aviation.
- Hugh Ingram Watson, QPM, Commandant, Scottish Police College.
- Kathleen Watson, Business Requirements Analyst, Board of Inland Revenue.
- Michael Robert Clarkson Webb. For services to the community in Surrey.
- Anthony Barton Wells. For services to the Family Justice System.
- Patrick Whinney, DSC, President, Guernsey Cheshire Home Foundation. For services to the community.
- Annarosa Whitehead. For services to the Women's Transport Service (First Aid Nursing Yeomanry).
- John Charles Williams, Secretary and Chief Executive, Institution of Electrical Engineers. For services to Electrical Engineering.
- William Gwyn Williams. For services to Library and Information Services in Wales.
- George Norman Wilson, Vice-Chairman, Peak Park Joint Planning Board, Peak District National Park. For services to Local Government.
- Monica Wilson. For services to disabled people.
- Primrose Eileen Wilson. For services to Conservation.
- Anthony Webbe Winkle. For services to the Construction Industry in Scotland.
- Samuel Derek Woods. For public service.

Diplomatic Service and Overseas List

- Norma Alice Cox Astwood, Vice-President, The Senate, Bermuda.
- David John Franklin Burton, Director, British Council, Jordan.
- The Honourable William McKeeva Bush, JP, Minister of Community Development, Sports, Women's and Youth Affairs and Culture, Cayman Islands.
- Alfred Chappory, BEM. For services to sport in Gibraltar.
- Chen Din-hwa. For charitable and community services in Hong Kong.
- Joan Collins. For services to drama.
- Michael John Cooper, Principal, British School in the Netherlands.
- William Montgomerie Courtauld. For services to British commercial interests in Hong Kong.
- Thomas Eddie Cowin, lately Director, British Council, Ghana.
- Anthony Campbell Crombie, Deputy Head of Mission, Belgrade.
- Christopher Tom Franklin. For services to British musical interests in France.
- Robert John Gladwell. For services to British commercial and aerospace interests in the United States of America.
- Stuart Wreford Harbinson, JP, Permanent Hong Kong Representative to the World Trade Organization, Geneva.
- Peter Anthony Jenner, lately Editor, NATO Review.
- Sarah Caroline Rowland Jones, LVO, lately First Secretary, HM Embassy, Budapest.
- Masood Husain Khan. For services to British Business in South-East Asia.
- John Worsley Knagg, Director, British Council English Language Centre, Singapore.
- Lam Shiu-kum. For services to medicine in Hong Kong.
- Gerald John Laving. For services to British business interests, and to the community, in Russia.
- Ranee Lee Pui-Leung, JP. For public and community service in Hong Kong.
- Shelly Lau Lee Lai-kuen, JP. Director of Home Affairs, Hong Kong.
- Edmund Kwong Ho Leung. For services to engineering in Hong Kong.
- Jurek Martin, Washington Bureau Chief, Financial Times.
- Patrick Joseph McGuinness, lately First Secretary, British Embassy, Abu Dhabi.
- Evelyn Hugh Norie. For services to British business interests in Hong Kong.
- Alan Richardson, JP, Director, Accounting Services, Hong Kong.
- Rolf Schild. For public and industrial services.
- Michael John Steere. For services to British engineering in Norway.
- Ian Robert Strachan, JP, Director of Social Welfare, Hong Kong.
- Robert Wallace. For services to British commercial interests overseas.
- Michael David Williams, Rabbi to the Copernic community in Paris.
- David Wong Shou-yeh, JP. For services to business and the community, Hong Kong.
- The Honourable Samuel Wong Ping-wai, MBE, JP. For public services, Hong Kong.
- William John Woods. For services to community health care in Brazil.
- Raymond Wu Wai-yung. For services to psychiatric rehabilitation in Hong Kong.
- Helen Yu Lai Ching-ping, JP, Director of Education, Hong Kong.

==== Member of the Order of the British Empire (MBE) ====
Military Division

Royal Navy

- Chief Petty Officer (Operations) (Radar) Alan James Baker, D077088R.
- Chief Petty Officer Air Engineering Artificer (L) Stephen Michael Baker, D109087R.
- Lieutenant Commander Harry Colin Cook.
- Lieutenant Commander Alan Robert Cronin.
- Lieutenant Commander Reginald Keith Elsworth.
- Lieutenant Commander David Michael Foster.
- Sergeant Steven Paul Goodwin, Royal Marines, P040469W.
- Lieutenant Commander (SCC) Denise Lilian Gravestock, Royal Navy Reserve.
- Lieutenant Commander (Acting Commander) Hubert Frederick Hatton.
- Warrant Officer Peter Robert Jones.
- Lieutenant Commander Simon John Nicholson Kings.
- Warrant Officer Michael Stephen Lacey.
- Warrant Officer Class 1 Peter Lawton, Royal Marines.
- Lieutenant Commander (now Commander) Christopher Charles Leggett.
- Lieutenant Commander Anthony Joseph Mawson.
- Warrant Officer Harold Milne.
- Lieutenant Commander (now Acting Commander) Geoffrey Charles Pell.
- Chief Petty Officer (Diver) John Robert Smith, D053657P.
- Colour Sergeant Alan Keith Turner, Royal Marines, P032549Y.
- Warrant Officer Nigel Frank Wallace.
- Lieutenant (now Lieutenant Commander) Geoffrey Ian Woodford.
- Warrant Officer Simon Yui Kwok Choi.

Army

- The Reverend John Stephen Alker (513792), Chaplain to the Forces (3rd Class), Royal Army Chaplains' Department.
- Major James Victor Glen Bain (520977), The Argyll and Sutherland Highlanders.
- 24821742 Corporal Christopher David Ernest Bessey, The Royal Logistic Corps.
- Lieutenant Russell John Bishop (546098), The Parachute Regiment.
- Major Crispin Nicholas Black (511814), Welsh Guards.
- Major Alexander Thomas Boyd (496287), The Royal Logistic Corps.
- Major Joseph Bright (518051), Adjutant General's Corps (SPS).
- 24652448 Sergeant (Acting Staff Sergeant) David William Brown, The Royal Logistic Corps.
- Major Malcolm Hugh Peter Buchanan (495490), The Royal Logistic Corps.
- 24330851 Warrant Officer Class 1 Andrew Kenneth George Card, The Royal Logistic Corps.
- Major Steven Cheetham, TD, (495676), Corps of Royal Engineers (Volunteers), Territorial Army.
- Acting Lieutenant Colonel John Cobb (448934), Stonyhurst College Combined Cadet Force, Territorial Army.
- Major Gavin Terence Collinson (501572), The Royal Logistic Corps.
- 24563002 Staff Sergeant Anthony Raymond Cooper, Adjutant General's Corps (RMP).
- 24185755 Warrant Officer Class 1 Alan John Crawford, Scots Guards.
- 24198806 Warrant Officer Class 1 William Crook, Adjutant General's Corps (SPS).
- 23962020 Staff Sergeant Graham Stuart Daniell, Corps of Royal Electrical and Mechanical Engineers.
- 24511850 Sergeant (Acting Colour Sergeant) Stephen Denham, The Worcestershire and Sherwood Foresters Regiment.
- 24072935 Staff Sergeant John James Flannigan, The Light Dragoons.
- Captain John William Alexander France, BEM, (508406), The Green Howards (Volunteers), Territorial Army.
- 24750683 Corporal Michael Sean Gill, Corps of Royal Engineers.
- Major Richard Duncan Brownrigg Gordon (513813), Adjutant General's Corps (ETS).
- Major Paul Anthony Philip Griffiths (517124) Royal Regiment of Artillery.
- Captain (Queen's Gurkha Officer) Dharmendra Gurung (537028), The Royal Gurkha Rifles.
- Major (Gurkha Commissioned Officer) Lilbahadur Gurung (513800), Queen's Gurkha Signals.
- Major Lester Andrew Holley (505640), The Royal Gurkha Rifles.
- Major Anthony Lovell Jackson (509141), Royal Regiment of Artillery.
- Acting Major John Frederick Kemp (486467), Kent Army Cadet Force, Territorial Army.
- 24011748 Warrant Officer Class 2 Christopher Keogh, Royal Regiment of Artillery.
- 24256499 Corporal of Horse Ian Kirkpatrick, The Life Guards.
- Major Robert Scott Lawther (520854), The Royal Irish Regiment.
- Major Philip John Leighton (509537), The Green Howards.
- Major Allan Charles LeQuelenec (520025), Royal Army Medical Corps.
- Major Richard Allen Licence (530853), Royal Corps of Signals.
- Major Simon Jonathan Alun Lloyd (499742), Royal Regiment of Artillery.
- 24435856 Warrant Officer Class 2 John MacKinnon, Corps of Royal Engineers.
- Lieutenant Colonel Donald Anderson MacLean (Retired).
- Acting Lieutenant Colonel Peter David Marsden (473626), Monkton Combe School Combined Cadet Force, Territorial Army.
- 24335098 Warrant Officer Class 1 Terence George Morrissey, Adjutant General's Corps (SPS).
- Lieutenant Stuart Joseph Nye (546430), The Princess of Wales's Royal Regiment.
- 24853206 Lance Corporal (Acting Corporal) Derrick Anthony O'Connor, Corps of Royal Engineers.
- 24413672 Colour Sergeant Stuart Owen Oliver, The Royal Regiment of Fusiliers.
- Lieutenant (Acting Captain) Nigel Derek Partington (546198), Royal Army Medical Corps.
- Captain (Acting Major) Brian William Pitchforth (537833), The Parachute Regiment.
- 24256052 Warrant Officer Class 1 Joseph Thomas Preece, The Light Dragoons.
- Major (Acting Lieutenant Colonel) Graham Evan William Tudor Raikes (510624), Adjutant General's Corps (SPS).
- 24565384 Warrant Officer Class 2 John Joseph Richards, Adjutant General's Corps (RMP).
- W0801011 Staff Sergeant Sandra Robson, The Royal Logistic Corps.
- Major Philip James Francois Schofield (495231), The Royal Green Jackets.
- Major Michael Peter Shapland (504505), Royal Tank Regiment.
- Major Alistair Colin Sheppard (508235), Corps of Royal Engineers.
- Acting Lieutenant Colonel Robin Fitzroy Somerset (414981), Winchester College Combined Cadet Force, Territorial Army.
- 24386268 Warrant Officer Class 2 Kevin Stewart, Royal Regiment of Artillery.
- Captain John Sutherland (537667), The Highlanders.
- Major Leslie Harris-Ward, TD, (502300), The Parachute Regiment (Volunteers), Territorial Army.
- Major Robert William Warren (513382), Adjutant General's Corps (RMP).

Overseas Award

- Lieutenant Wong Hon Wing (538568), General List.

Royal Air Force

- Flight Sergeant Ronald John Bennett (D8011572).
- Flight Lieutenant Ian Michael Beresford (8151887).
- Warrant Officer George Arthur Biddleston (D8068720).
- Sergeant Karl Richard Brown (D8126056).
- Flight Lieutenant (now Squadron Leader) Stephen John Butler (8080431).
- Squadron Leader Sean Chiddention (8028456).
- Flight Lieutenant Andrew Cubin (8027993).
- Flight Lieutenant Neil Cummings (3145881), Royal Air Force Volunteer Reserve (Training).
- Corporal Anthony David Deacon (R8198216).
- Squadron Leader Brian Dean (4278701), (Retired).
- Junior Technician Peter Doherty (E8254300).
- Corporal Christine Doyley (E8233551).
- Squadron Leader Iain Roderic Gillespie (2618287), (Retired).
- Warrant Officer Anthony John Gough, BEM, (N1944467).
- Corporal (now Acting Sergeant) Alistair Colin Green (B8213475).
- Warrant Officer Michael John Hatch (M0593513).
- Squadron Leader Mark William Gardner Hopkins (2625781).
- Warrant Officer William James Cameron Kearney, BEM, (D1949781).
- Sergeant Gary Kennedy (L8001367).
- Sergeant Roy Martin (A8015128).
- Warrant Officer Brian David Medland (R1949361), (Retired).
- Corporal (now Acting Sergeant) Kevin John Mulloy (F8201300).
- Corporal Ian William Partington (T8153337).
- Squadron Leader Vivienne Alexandra Sim (2797569), (Retired).
- Warrant Officer Keith Alexander Smith (P8089172).
- Squadron Leader Steven Glynn Smyth (8025529).
- Warrant Officer Barry Walch (U4287360).
- Junior Technician Peter Allan Wildman (D8410829).
- Squadron Leader Timothy Andrew Wilkinson (5203138).
- Master Aircrew Alistair John Woolfson (T8018944).

Civil Division

- Kenneth Elliott Ackerley. For services to Physically Handicapped People.
- Graham Clifford Adams, Storekeeper, Manufacturing Division, Rolls-Royce & Associates plc. For services to the Automobile Industry.
- William Aitken. For services to the community in Aberdeen.
- Anne Aldred, Revenue Assistant, Board of Inland Revenue.
- Richard John Alibone, Senior Professional Technical Officer, Foreign and Commonwealth Office.
- Lieutenant Commander Peter Douglas Allen, Royal Navy (Retd.), Retired Officer 2, Ministry of Defence.
- Yashwanti Chandrakant Amlani. For services to Community Relations in Bristol.
- Ann McCall Amos, Personal Secretary, Ministry of Defence.
- Dorothy Anderson, Administrative Officer, Department of Social Security.
- John Elwyn Anderson. For services to the community, particularly Lifesaving, in South Wales.
- Royan Stuart Anderson, Constable, Operational Support Unit, British Transport Police. For services to Public Transport.
- Timothy John Anderson, Sergeant, Derbyshire Constabulary. For services to the Police.
- Edmund Robert Askey. For services to Tourism in Blackpool, Lancashire.
- Charles Keith Atkinson. For services to Young People in Nottinghamshire and to Rowing.
- Elizabeth Atkinson, Member, Northumberland County Council. For services to Local Government.
- Marjone Oxnard Atkinson. For services to the community on the Pennywell Estate, Sunderland, Tyne and Wear.
- Peggy Baerlein. For services to the Lister Hospital, Hertfordshire.
- Beryl Bailey, Support Grade Band 1, Home Office.
- Peter Edwin Bailey, lately Senior Doorkeeper, House of Lords.
- Albert John Baker. For services to War Pensions Committees in London.
- Elsie Evelyn Baker. For services to the Girls' Brigade on Guernsey.
- Kenneth Walter Ball, lately Honorary Secretary, British Transport Pensioners' Federation. For services to the Railway Industry.
- Jack Bonner Barlow. For services to Local Councils in the former South Glamorgan and to the community in Sully.
- Andrew Brown Barr. For services to the Royal Agricultural Benevolent Institution and to the Essex Agricultural Society.
- Dennis Gordon Bartholomew. For services to the community in Whiston, South Yorkshire.
- Haydn Sydney Bateman, Auxiliary Coastguard-in-charge, Her Majesty's Coastguard, St Govans, Dyfed. For services to Safety at Sea.
- Derek Baum. For services to the Association of Jewish ex-Servicemen and Women.
- Donald James MacDonald Beaton, Shepherd, Roslin Institute. For services to Scientific Research.
- Mary Loveday Beazley. For services to the community in Wormley, Hertfordshire.
- Marian Beckett, Assistant Caretaker, Priestley College, Warrington, Cheshire. For services to Education.
- Howard Philip Bell, Honorary Liaison Officer (Eastern Region), Royal National Lifeboat Institution. For services to the RNLI.
- Clarice Mary Bennett. For services to the British Red Cross Society in Norfolk.
- Thelma Berry. For services to the Norfolk Foster Care Association.
- David Wyn Bevan. For services to Industrial Relations in Wales.
- Mary Winifred Bevan. For services to the NSPCC in Merthyr Tydfil.
- Deirdre Bevis, Administrative Officer, Ministry of Defence.
- Fred Billingsley, Higher Professional and Technology Officer, Ministry of Defence.
- Anthea Billington, Secretary to the Managing Director, Britannia Airways Ltd. For services to the Aviation Industry.
- Margaret Elizabeth Bingham. For services to Tourism.
- Jean Shirley Bird, Range B, Her Majesty's Treasury.
- Edward John Birkett. For services to the community in Canning Town, London.
- Brian Anthony Blackshaw, Sub-Divisional Officer, West Mercia Special Constabulary. For services to the Police.
- Mary Elizabeth Bloomer. For services to the community.
- Christine Boddy. For political service.
- William Charles Boddy, Founder and Editor, Motor Sport. For services to Sports Journalism.
- Barbara May Bolton. For services to the community in the area of Manningtree, Essex.
- Margaret Helena Booth. For political service.
- Patricia Mary Bottrill, Department Head (Ambulatory Care), Royal Victoria Infirmary, Newcastle-Upon-Tyne. For services to Health Care.
- Ruth Olive Boult. For services to the community in Messingham, South Humberside.
- Keith Du Brettargh Bowen. For services to disabled people in Leeds, West Yorkshire.
- Arthur Thomas Bowley. For services to the community in Brecon, Powys.
- The Reverend Father William Boyd, Officiating Chaplain, British Forces Rheindahlen. For services to the Armed Forces.
- John James Brady. For services to the Employment Service in Hebburn, Tyne and Wear.
- John Michael Brannon, Chairman, PMI Food Group UK, Foster Refrigerator Group of Companies. For services to Export.
- William Bratty. For charitable services to the community in Perth.
- Barbara Brewster, Personal Secretary, Board of Inland Revenue.
- Jean Brinkworth. For services to Guiding, particularly the Ranger Section, in the former South Glamorgan.
- Margaret Aline Jessica Brockbank. For services to the community in Bournemouth, Dorset.
- Wilfred Brockway. For services to the community in Fontmell Magna, Dorset.
- Cyril Albert Broom. For services to Legal Education.
- Barbara Brown. For political service.
- Jack Watson Brown. For political and public service.
- John Stuart Brown, General Medical Practitioner, Larkfield, Kent. For services to Medicine.
- Ronald Ezekiel Browne, Member, London Borough of Hammersmith and Fulham. For services to Local Government.
- Roger Ian Bryant. For services to the community in Martlesham, Suffolk.
- Brian Francis Bryceland, Senior Executive Officer, Department of Social Security.
- Cyril Percy Bunn. For services to Journalism in Cornwall.
- Christine Dorothe Burges. For services to Young People in Edenbndge, Kent.
- John Christopher Burne, Voluntary Observer, Meteorological Office, Kent.
- Patricia Rose Burnett. For services to Service Families in Hereford.
- Susan Marilyn Burns. For services to the Rela Goldhill Lodge, London and to Young Disabled People.
- Herbert Roy Butler. For services to the community in Frome, Somerset.
- William Anthony Butler. For political service.
- Maxwell Charles Cadmore. For services to Health Care in Swansea, South Wales.
- Walter Rounsfell Cairns, lately Literature Director, Scottish Arts Council. For services to Literature.
- William Martin Calderbank. For services to the Engineering Industry.
- Joseph Graham Campbell. For services to the community.
- Reginald John Cann, lately Maintenance Supervisor, Crown Estate Commissioners.
- Harold Canning, Chairman, Wolverhampton and Walsall Committee for the Employment of People with Disabilities. For services to the Employment of Disabled People.
- Pamela Kathleen Cannon, Revenue Typist, Board of Inland Revenue.
- Peter Andrew Carruthers. For services to Sport for People with Disabilities.
- Mary Shane Casement. For services to the Rehabilitation of Offenders.
- Allan Lewis Chambers. For services to Agriculture.
- Derek Chambers, Senior Investigation Officer, Her Majesty's Board of Customs and Excise.
- Eileen Dorothy Chambers, Member, Board of Visitors, Her Majesty's Prison and Young Offenders' Institution Drake Hall. For services to Prisoner Welfare.
- John Theng Keong Chan, Executive Officer, Department of Health.
- Stephen Victor Chandler, Constable, Metropolitan Police. For services to the Police.
- Captain Kandiah Chandran, lately Chief Executive, Presentation Housing Association. For services to the Housing Association Movement.
- Dipakkumar Govindji Chauhan. For services to Community Relations in Tameside, Manchester.
- Charles Peter Chivers. For services to the community in Cuddington, Cheshire.
- Alan Leslie Chorley, lately Treasurer, Access Committee for England. For services to disabled people.
- Celia Ruth Bonham Christie, Founder and Life President, Triumph Over Phobia. For services to the community.
- William Christie, DFM. For services to the Royal Air Forces Association.
- Alan Ernest Clark, Senior Executive Officer, Acas, Department of Trade and Industry.
- Audrey Clark, lately Superintendent Registrar, Gateshead Metropolitan Borough Council. For services to the community.
- John Clark, Design Engineer, Royal Observatory, Edinburgh. For services to Astronomy.
- Joan Clarke, General Assistant, Dining Hall, Worcester College of Higher Education. For services to Education.
- Robert Clarke, Trident Boat Manager, VSEL. For services to the Defence Industry.
- Stephen Harold Henry Clarke. For services to Archaeology in Monmouth.
- Margaret Winifred Clarkson. For services to Carlisle Cathedral.
- Phyllis Mary Coates. For services to the community in Shere, Surrey.
- Elizabeth Cochrane. For services to War Pensions Committees.
- June Elizabeth Coleman. For services to the community in Bath.
- Allan Barratt Collins, General Assistant, Tesco, Sutton, Surrey. For services to Food Retailing.
- John Frederick Collis, Constable, Metropolitan Police. For services to the Police.
- Leonard Conaway. For services to the Community in Cumbria
- Allison Gardner Cook. For political and public service.
- Dorothy Mary Cooke. For services to the community in Leicester.
- Joseph John Cooke, Mayor's Office, Lincoln City Council. For services to Local Government.
- Kathleen Roberta Joyce Cooper. For services to the St. John Ambulance Brigade.
- Tony Corfield, National Co-ordinator, National Health and Safety Groups Council. For services to Health and Safety.
- Ronald Stanley Cornwell. For services to the community in Crawley, West Sussex.
- Mary Barbara Corrall, lately Senior Executive Officer, Her Majesty's Board of Customs and Excise
- Myrna Jean Corrie, Principal, Farm Secretarial Business, and President, Scottish Young Farmers' Association. For services to Farming.
- Colin Cotton. For services to the Royal Naval Sailing Association.
- Henry Cottrell, lately Butler, Dorneywood Trust. For services to Government Hospitality.
- Olwen Jessie Couldridge, Secretary, Park Primary School, Newham, London. For services to Education.
- Derek Coulthard, Senior Executive Officer, Department of Social Security.
- Roger Brian Courtney. For services to people who are homeless.
- Eileen Frances Coutts. For services to the Sea Cadet Corps in East London.
- Derrick Stanley Cox, Head Chef, Pembroke College, University of Oxford. For services to Higher Education.
- Veronica Mary Coxon. For services to WRVS in Sutton Coldfield, West Midlands.
- Freda Elizabeth Moody Craig. For services to Golf
- Jacqueline Ainslie Diana Craig. For services to the Gurkha Welfare Trusts.
- Sheila Elizabeth Craine. For services to the community in Merseyside.
- Stephen James Croad, lately Head of Record, National Buildings, Royal Commission on the Historical Monuments of England.
- Eric Kenneth Crompton, Business Development Manager, Matra Marconi Space UK Ltd. For services to the Space Industry.
- June Pamela Cromwell, Technician, Southern Water. For services to the Water Industry.
- The Reverend Hugh Geoffrey Cross. For services to Ecumenical Relations in Milton Keynes, Buckinghamshire.
- Joaquim Jose Cubertino, Head Waiter, Catering Department, St Thomas' Hospital, London. For services to Health Care.
- Frederick Ernest Cullen, Administrative Assistant, the Benefits Agency, Department of Social Security.
- The Reverend Richard Cullington, TD, lately Officiating Chaplain, RAF St Mawgan. For services to the Royal Air Force.
- Kathleen Curnock. For services to Voluntary Services.
- Charles Starr Curry, Editor, New Milton Advertiser & Lymington Times. For services to Journalism in Hampshire.
- Gerald Cutcliffe, Wildlife Ranger, Forestry Commission.
- Margaret D'Arcy, Actress. For services to Drama.
- Peter Aubrey Victor D'Costa, Higher Executive Officer, Department of the Environment.
- Rose D'Costa, Personal Secretary, Department of Transport.
- John Christopher Dale, Managing Director, John Dale Ltd. For services to Industry in Wales.
- Mary Margaret Dalligan, lately Home Care Worker, London Borough of Southwark. For services to the community.
- Celeste Dandeker, Artistic Director, Candoco. For services to Dance and to Disabled People.
- Peter Daniel, Chairman, Ridgemond Training, Stevenage, Hertfordshire. For services to Training and Young People.
- Wasim Darr, President, UK Islamic Mission (Southern Region). For services to Community Relations.
- Harriet Emily Rhys-Davies. For political and public service.
- Irene Joyce Davies. For services to the community in Pantymwyn, Flintshire.
- Joyce Mary Davies. For services to the British Red Cross Society in Shropshire.
- Catherine Elizabeth Dawson, Chief Administrative Dental Officer, Grampian Health Board. For services to Dentistry.
- Geoffrey Michael Day. For services to the Oil Industry.
- Hugh Ludlow de Quetteville. For charitable services.
- Simon Patrick Dell, Constable, Devon and Cornwall Constabulary. For services to the Police.
- William Ernest Denny. For services to Soldiers', Sailors' and Airmen's Families Association in Warwickshire.
- Royland Charles Derham, General Secretary, the TS Vindicatrix Association. For services to the Merchant Navy.
- Joyce Muriel Dewey. For services to the community in Lymington, Hampshire.
- Frederick Gains Dobson. For services to the Ex-Service Fellowship Centres.
- Ingnd Julia Dodd. For political services.
- John Doherty. For services to Disabled ex-Servicemen and Women.
- Maurice Francis Donaghy, Assistant Controller, The Stamp Office, Board of Inland Revenue.
- Hilda Donaldson. For services to Education.
- Margaret Agnes Donaldson. For services to the WRVS in Llanelh, Dyfed.
- Teresa Doonan. For services to the Glazert Activity Group, Lennox Castle Hospital, Glasgow.
- Marina Duckmanton, Management Pay Band 4, the Employment Service, Department for Education and Employment.
- James Duncan. For services to the Scout Association in Scotland.
- Denis Durno, DL, General Medical Practitioner, Portlethen, Aberdeenshire. For services to Medicine.
- Eric Anthony Dyer, Welfare Officer, National Grid Company plc. For services to Personnel Management.
- Elizabeth Stella Dyke. For services to the community in Sherborne, Dorset.
- Pamela Elaine Earl, Higher Executive Officer, Crown Prosecution Service.
- Mary Jean Easter, Clerical Assistant, Wiltshire Constabulary. For services to the Police.
- Daphne Viola Edginton. For services to the community in Milton-under-Wychwood, Oxfordshire.
- Geoffrey Stephen Edwards, Managing Director, Oxley Developments Company Ltd. For services to Industry.
- Harry Allen Edwards. For services to the Anglers Conservation Association.
- Michael Edwards, Administrative Officer, Department for Education and Employment.
- Pauline Edwards, Divisional Commandant, Special Constabulary, Dorset Police. For services to the Police.
- Margaret M. Eglington, lately Conductor, Billingham String Orchestra and Billingham Friday Choir, Cleveland Peripatetic Music Service. For services to Music Education.
- James Murray Elliot, lately Chairman, Scout Association, East Sussex. For services to Scouting.
- Brian Henry Ellis, Founder, Vision Aid Overseas. For Charitable Services.
- Pauline Ann Ellis. For services to the community in Derby.
- Harry Emerson. For services to the community in Stockton-on-Tees, Cleveland.
- Elizabeth Margaret Evans. For services to the community, particularly Disabled People, in Llanelli, Dyfed.
- Shirley Everett, Newsvendor. For services to the community in Westminster, London.
- Doris Mabel Eves. For services to the Citizens' Advice Bureau in Farnborough, Hampshire.
- George Fitton Exley, Honorary Secretary, Scarborough Lifeboat Station. For services to the Royal National Lifeboat Institution.
- Ellen Branker Farmer, President, Old Paisley Society. For services to Conservation.
- Margaret Winifred Farmer. For services to the Royal British Legion in Sevenoaks, Kent.
- Eric Arnold Faux. For services to disabled people in Birmingham
- Valerie Ann Fea, lately Executive Secretary, the School Library Association. For services to Librananship and to Young People.
- Heather Duncan Findlay, Local Officer 2, the Benefits Agency, Department of Social Security.
- Nina Mary Fineron, lately Typist, Department of Social Security.
- Isabel H. Finlay, lately Chiropodist, Glasgow. For services to Health Care.
- Millar Henry Finlay, Divisional Officer, (Special Constabulary), Flintshire Division, North Wales Police. For services to the Police.
- Olwen Finlay. For services to Physiotherapy.
- Evelyn May Fisher. For services to Netball in Coventry.
- Myra Caroline Fisher. For services to the community in Paulsgrove, Portsmouth, Hampshire.
- Bernard Joseph Fitzsimmons. For public service.
- Michael Robert Flegg, Catering Manager, Nottingham City Hospital. For services to Health Care.
- Iris Mary Fletcher. For services to the community in Crowborough, East Sussex.
- Dorothy Christine Flynn. For services to Young People in Winchester, Hampshire.
- Thomas William Foley, Warder Supervisor, National Gallery.
- Patricia Folland. For services to Young People in South Shields, Tyne and Wear.
- Pauline Anne Force, School Secretary, Oakfield County Primary Junior School, Dartford, Kent. For services to Education.
- James Paton Hunter Ford, Team Leader/Instructor, Steelwork, Yarrow Shipbuilders Ltd. For services to the Shipbuilding Industry.
- Robert Peter Ford, Sorter, Parcelforce, East Midlands. For services to the Post Office and to Industrial Relations.
- Audley Moraise Forrester, Interchange Manager, South Yorkshire Passenger Transport Executive. For services to Public Transport.
- John Robert Fortnam, Group Purchase Manager, Aerospace Group, Rolls-Royce plc. For services to the Aerospace Industry.
- Alfred Foster, Founder, African Leprosy Aid. For charitable services.
- John Christopher Foxley, Water Supply Manager, Southern Water. For services to the Water Industry.
- Annis Grace Campbell Frackelton. For services to Family Care in Edinburgh.
- Lesley Margaret Freeman, Range D, Her Majesty's Treasury.
- Michael William Thomas Freeman, Inspector, Lincolnshire Constabulary. For services to the community.
- Denzil Kingson Freeth. For services to the Church of England in London.
- Patricia Froomberg. For services to disabled people.
- Norah Fryer. For services to Elderly People in Church Lawton, Cheshire.
- Michael Fuller, Laboratory Services Manager, Laboratory of Molecular Biology. For services to Biology.
- Edward Frank Gale. For political service.
- Richard Gallagher. For services to the community in Aberdeen.
- Lucy Gannon, Writer. For services to Television Drama.
- Richard Ian Gardner. For services to the Police.
- Arthur Buchan Geddes, Sector Officer, the Coastguard Agency, Department of Transport.
- Arthur Samuel George, School Crossing Patrol, Portsmouth, Hampshire. For services to Road Safety.
- James Alexander George, Administrative Officer, Ministry of Defence.
- Graham James Gibb, Leader, Grampian Police and Braemar Mountain Rescue Teams. For services to Mountain Rescue.
- Alison Gray Gibson, Temporary Project Manager, Royal Mail, Edinburgh. For services to the Post Office.
- Sydney Gibson, Secretary, Fergusons Lane Tenants Association. For services to the community in Scotswood, Newcastle-upon-Tyne.
- Valerie Gibson. For services to the Right to Peace and Quiet Campaign.
- Joan Giddings, lately Office Administrator, British Apparel and Textile Confederation. For services to the Clothing Industry.
- Elizabeth Glasgow. For services to the community in Wester Hailes, Edinburgh.
- John Glover. For services to Golf.
- Maureen Audrey Gobbett, Higher Executive Officer, Ministry of Defence.
- Major Douglas George Goddard. For services to the community in Wargrave-on-Thames, Berkshire.
- David William Goodall. For services to Nature Conservation in Hampshire.
- Ian Kenmure Evans-Gordon. For political service.
- Stephen Goulding, Pay Band 8, the Employment Service, Department for Education and Employment.
- Anne Greaves. For services to the Health and Safety Commission's Occupational Health Advisory Committee.
- Evelyn Greechan, Senior Traffic Warden, City of Glasgow Police. For services to Road Safety.
- Ian Greenlaw, Support Grade Band 1, Her Majesty's Customs and Excise.
- Brian Gregory, Facilities Manager, Sussex Police. For services to the Police.
- Sylvia Gladys Grove, Office Support Grade Band 2, Home Office.
- Alan Joseph Gruar, Training Manager, Lucas Aerospace, Wolverhampton Training Centre, LucasVarity plc. For services to Training.
- Leslie Gurney. For services to the community in Stockport, Cheshire.
- Jessie Haggarty. For services to Highland Dancing.
- Jonathan Ian Hague, Detective Inspector, Metropolitan Police. For services to the Police.
- Alfred Hall. For services to the World Ploughing Organisation.
- Arthur Charles Hall. For services to the community in Walton-on-Thames, Surrey.
- Eileen Hall, Administrative Officer, Department of Social Security.
- Edna Hilda Knight Hallatt, Governor, Newcastle-under-Lyme School, Staffordshire. For services to Education.
- Mae Hamilton, Administrative Officer, Home Office.
- Brenda Margaret Hancock, lately Personal Secretary, Health and Safety Executive, Department of the Environment
- Angela Kathenne Hanley, Training Manager, First Aid Centre, London Transport. For services to Public Transport.
- Hilda Harding. For services to Mind and to the Elderly and Disadvantaged in Sutton, Surrey.
- Anthony Shannon Harman. For services to Agriculture and to the British Charolais Cattle Society.
- Susan Gladys Harper, Practice Nurse (Sister), Roslin Medical Centre, Midlothian. For services to Health Care.
- David Harris. For services to the Post Office and to the community in Scunthorpe, Lincolnshire.
- Marion Constance Harrison. For services to the Schizophrenia Fellowship on Jersey.
- Maureen Hart, Personal Secretary, Vickers Defence Systems Ltd. For services to the Defence Industry.
- Patricia Mary Hart. For services to the community on Alderney.
- William Mark Hartley. For services to the community in Coventry.
- Dorothy Elizabeth Hawes, Vocal Department Consultant, Trinity College of Music, London. For services to Music Education.
- Judith Anne Hawkshaw. For services to Housing and the community in Suffolk.
- Shirley Caroline Amelia Hawley, lately Nursing Assistant, Pease Hill Residential Unit, Nottingham Healthcare Trust. For services to Health Care.
- Dinnie Margaret Hawthorne. For services to the community, particularly Elderly People in Bourne End, Buckinghamshire.
- Gordon Charles Hay, Gas Engineer. For humanitarian services to the former Yugoslavia.
- Arthur Rowland Hayter. For charitable services in Waterlooville, Hampshire.
- Desmond Heard, Gas Engineer. For humanitarian services to the former Yugoslavia.
- Albert Maurice Heath. For services to the Nevill Hall Hospital League of Friends, Abergavenny, Gwent.
- Alison Helen Constance Heath, Curator, the British Library. For services to Librananship and to Deaf People.
- Barbara Ceha Heath. For services to the community in Ringmer, East Sussex.
- Leslie Heath, Publican. For services to the community in East London.
- Patricia Ann Hedges, Education Advisor, Parcelforce. For services to the Freight Industry.
- Joy Stevenson Heeley, lately Revenue Officer, Board of Inland Revenue.
- Thomas William Heler, Member, Staffordshire Parish Councils Association. For services to Local Government.
- Mabel Evelyn Jeanette Henderson. For services to the Guide Association in Shetland.
- Joan Elizabeth Hetherington. For public service.
- Major John Wilfred Barratt Hext, TD, Voluntary Observer, Meteorological Office, Cumbria.
- Sheila Jean Hibbert. For services to Young People in London.
- Herbert Vincent Higgins. For services to the Retired and Senior Volunteer Programme.
- Eileen Jeanne Hodder. For services to the community in Richmond upon Thames, Surrey.
- Eileen Hodgkinson. For political and public service
- Marjone Hodgson. For services to the community in York.
- Mavis Ruth Hogg. For services to Lawn Tennis.
- Olive Holden. For services to the Cancer Relief Macmillan Fund in Perthshire.
- David George Holland, Senior Road Safety Officer, Durham County Council. For services to Road Safety.
- John Kenneth Hollis. For charitable services in Kent.
- Thomas Holmes, lately Assistant Director, Environmental Services, Trafford Metropolitan Borough Council. For services to the Environment.
- Albert Joseph Thomas Honey. For services to Animal Welfare in Oxfordshire.
- James William Hopkins, lately Manager, District Office, East Midlands Electricity plc. For services to the Electricity Industry.
- Robert Hopper, Road Worker, Highways Division, Northumberland Contracting. For services to Highways Maintenance.
- Olive Mary Hopton. For services to the community in Irlam, Manchester.
- Beve Hornsby. For services to People with Dyslexia.
- Anne Jamieson Hosie, Executive Officer, the Benefits Agency, Department of Social Security.
- Ralph John Howe, Gardener, Kettering General Hospital, Northamptonshire. For services to Health Care.
- Arthur William Howell, leading Firefighter, London Fire and Civil Defence Authority. For services to the Fire Service.
- Edna Emily Howes. For services to the Royal British Legion in Northamptonshire.
- Denis Arthur Huggons. For services to the London Gardens Society.
- Margaret Florence Hughes, Postwoman, Royal Mail. For services to the Post Office and to the community in Wollaston, Northamptonshire.
- Mildred Emily Hughes, Chief Clerk, Llangefni County Court, Lord Chancellor's Department.
- David Bain Hume, Director, Philomusica. For services to Music in Edinburgh.
- Dorothy Hunt. For services to the Sea Cadet Corps in Nottingham.
- Sarah Ruth Hunt. For services to Disabled Children in Northampton.
- Marion Hunter. For services to the Fire Service.
- John Malcolm Huntington. For services to Sports Journalism in Yorkshire.
- Margaret Isobel Hutcheon, Headteacher, Mosstowie Primary School, Morayshire. For services to Education.
- Helen Rosalind Hutchinson, Tourist Guide. For services to Tourism.
- Derek Cecil George Hynds, Senior Professional and Technology Officer, Ministry of Defence.
- Simon Louis Jackson. For services to Judo for Disabled People.
- Sydney Frederic Jacobs. For services to the community in Liverpool.
- Arjan Singh Jagdev. For services to the ethnic community in Merton, London.
- Mary James. For services to Farming and to Consumer Affairs.
- John Malcolm Jefkins. For political service.
- Charles Jerrard. For services to the British Limbless Ex-Service Men's Association in Romford, Essex.
- Andy Derrick Johnson, Section Leader, Mathematics and Technology Department, Southwark College, London. For services to Education.
- George Refoy Johnston, Vice Chairman, Eildon Housing Association. For services to Housing.
- Samuel Hans Johnston, Process and General Supervisory Grade D, Ministry of Defence.
- Carol Theresa Jones, lately Senior Personal Secretary, the Highways Agency, Department of Transport.
- David Charles Newhams Jones, lately Journalist, Ashton Reporter. For services to Journalism in Lancashire.
- David Lloyd Jones, lately Chief Executive, Arfon Borough Council. For services to Local Government.
- Howard Leslie Jones, Maintenance Technician, Stanlow Manufacturing Complex, Shell UK Ltd. For services to Health and Safety.
- Ivy Jones. For services to the community in Tayside.
- Janice Jones. For services to the community, particularly Young Children, in Adamsdown, Cardiff.
- Robert Meinon Jones. For services to Choral Music in the District of Ffestiniog, Gwynedd.
- Lieutenant Colonel Robert Ian Hywel-Jones, MC, Senior Executive Officer, Foreign and Commonwealth Office.
- Trevor Mostyn Jones. For services to the Environment in North East England.
- Vera Daisy Jones. For political and public service.
- Wendy Keene. For political service.
- Eileen Grace Kelly. For services to the community in Pulborough, West Sussex.
- Donald Fraser Kennedy, Honorary Chairman, Dalneigh Senior Citizen's Club. For services to Elderly People in Inverness.
- Richard Leighton Keys. For services to the community in Banbury, Oxfordshire.
- Malcolm John Kightley. For services to the Holy Sepulchre Church, Northampton.
- Lorna Jean King. For services to Jersey Hospice Care.
- Alison Kinnaird, Clarsach player and teacher, and glass engraver. For services to Music and to Art.
- Inna Kirillova. For services to Anglo/Russian relations.
- Captain Alex Kirk, lately Honorary Secretary, Hartlepool Lifeboat Station, Royal National Lifeboat Institution. For services to the RNLI.
- Bernadette Ann Kirk, Diabetes Specialist Nurse, Nottingham City Hospital NHS Trust. For services to Health Care.
- Donald Henry Kirk. For services to the Royal London Aid Society.
- Wendy Patricia Knight. For services to the British Red Cross Society in Hampshire.
- Alan Keith Knowles. For services to Remploy in Norwich, Norfolk.
- Mildred Eveline Knowles. For services to disabled people in Berkshire.
- Luis Eric Rupert de la Torre. For services to The St. Nazaire Society.
- Thomas Percival Langridge, Founder, the Pahar Trust. For charitable services.
- David Stuart Large, Constable, Cheshire Constabulary. For services to the Police and to the community in Winsford.
- Margaret Elsie Ann Lawrance. For services to the community in Loughton, Essex.
- Iain William Lawrence, Managing Director, Thomas Smith & Company (Peterhead) Ltd. For services to the Textile Industry.
- R. Mary Lawrence, Caretaker, Irfon Valley County Primary School, Powys. For services to Education and to the community.
- Bernard Robert Lawson, Lord Mayor's Secretary, Manchester City Council. For services to Local Government.
- Ann Lawthom, lately Headteacher, Rhondda Special School, Trealaw, Rhondda. For services to Education.
- Hilda Blanche Le Cras. For services to Horse Driving for the Disabled and to the Royal British Legion on Guernsey.
- Elizabeth May Leake. For charitable services in Clenchwarton, Norfolk.
- William Gordon John Leckie, Managing Director, Cneff Hydro Hotel, Perthshire. For services to the Hotel Industry and to Tourism.
- Bryan Neville Lee. For services to the Samaritans and to the community in Doncaster.
- Winifred Elizabeth Lees. For political and public service.
- Jacqueline Margaret Leete. For services to the community in Headley, Hampshire.
- Donald Clement Lefever. For services to the Butler Trust.
- Shiu-Wing Leung, Executive Officer, Ministry of Defence.
- Joan Lewin. For services to the Historical Association.
- Ann Lewis, Teacher in Charge, Widden Family Centre, Gloucester. For services to Pre-School Education.
- Peter Reginald Lewis, Sub-Officer (Retained), North Wales Fire Service. For services to the Fire Service.
- Maurice George Lihou. For services to Young Handicapped People on Guernsey.
- Sandra Elizabeth Linnett, lately Sales and Computer Clerk, Kopex International Ltd. For services to Industry.
- Rose Helena Lloyd. For services to St. David's Church, Hundleton.
- Adrian Neville Barrett Loach, Assistant Group Scout Leader, Bristol. For services to Scouting.
- Rebecca McCausland Lockhead. For public service
- Jean Elizabeth Lockwood. For services to the community in Amersham, Buckinghamshire.
- The Reverend Roy Frederick Lodge, Chaplain, Her Majesty's Prison Brockhill.
- Jaquelyn Patricia Longworth, Operational Safety and Policy Manager, Nuclear Electric Ltd. For services to Engineering Management.
- Walter Herbert Love. For services to Radio Journalism.
- Maurice Ernest Lowe, Engineering Manager, Vosper Thornycroft (UK) Ltd. For services to the Defence Industry.
- William Lowe. For services to the Library Service.
- June Valerie Lucas. For services to the community in Stanford Rivers, Essex.
- Brenda Germaine Lynn, Sub Divisional Officer, Special Constabulary, West Yorkshire Police. For services to the Police.
- Monica Lynskey, lately Administrative Officer, Office for Standards in Education.
- James Archibald MacDonald, Head Greenkeeper, Royal Lytham & St Annes Golf Club. For services to Golf.
- Thomas MacDougall, Retained Sub-Officer, Tayside Fire Brigade. For services to the Fire Service.
- Williamina MacGregor, School Cook, Lochardil Primary School, Inverness. For services to Education.
- Jean Macinnes. For services to the Citizens' Advice Bureau in Aberdeen.
- Laurence Macintyre, Chief Superintendent, Strathclyde Police. For services to the Police.
- John Kenneth MacKay, Crofter. For services to the community in Sutherlandshire.
- John Watson Mackay, Head of Recreation and Access Branch, Research and Advisory Services, Directorate, Scottish Natural Heritage. For services to Countryside Recreation.
- Florence King MacKenzie, Director, Scottish Churches Architectural Heritage Trust. For services to the Restoration of Church Buildings.
- George MacLean, lately Manager, Air Traffic Service, Sumburgh Airport (Shetland), Civil Aviation Authority. For services to Aviation.
- Elsie Macpherson. For services to Mentally Ill People.
- Maureen S. Macmillan, Chairman, City of Edinburgh Children's Panel Advisory Committee. For services to Young People.
- Stuart Macredie, lately Headteacher, St Albans Junior and Infant School, Wickersley, Rotherham. For services to Education.
- The Reverend Robert James Magee. For services to Community Relations.
- Alan Roderick Males. For services to Architecture.
- Patricia Anne Mansfield. For services to the community in Leicester.
- Constance May Marcroft. For services to Deaf People in Sheffield.
- Leslie George Mardell, Administrative Officer, London Fire and Civil Defence Authority. For services to the Fire Service.
- Samuel Steele Marsden. For services to Agriculture.
- Derek Marshall, Chief Executive, South Humber Business Advice Centre Ltd. For services to Business.
- Keith John Martin. For political and public service
- Rosemary Elizabeth Massey, Office Manager, Lord Chancellor's Department.
- Stanley Thomas Massey. For services to the community in Havant, Hampshire.
- Carole Kathleen Masters, Higher Executive Officer, Department of Social Security.
- William James McAlpine. For services to Scouting.
- Joan McCallion, Typist, Ministry of Defence.
- Rachel McClean. For services to Training.
- Isa McComb. For services to Housing.
- William Rae McCrindle, Chairman, McCrindle Group. For services to the Engineering Industry.
- David McCubbin, Compliance Manager, Board of Inland Revenue.
- Norman Charles John McElroy. For services to the Police.
- William McGowan, Farmer. For services to the Cattle Industry in Fife.
- Donald McKain, Staff Side Coordinator, Grampian Healthcare NHS Trust. For services to Health Care.
- Neil McKay, Revenue Executive, Board of Inland Revenue.
- Stuart William McKay. For services to the de Havilland Moth Club.
- Evelyn Hildegard McKinley, Administrative Officer, Ministry of Defence.
- Norman McLean, Director, National Mentoring Consortium. For services to the Ethnic Community.
- Richard Dick McLean, Prison Officer, Her Majesty's Prison, Edinburgh.
- Carol Ross McNeilage, Nursing Auxiliary, Vale of Leven Hospital, Alexandria. For services to Health Care and to the community.
- Valerie Matilda McNeill. For services to the Ports Industry.
- Paul McStay. For services to Association Football.
- Joseph Henry McWhirter. For services to the community and to the Post Office.
- Ivy Florence Medley. For services to the community in St Lawrence, Essex.
- Jeremiah Joseph Mee. For services to the Sick Dentist Scheme.
- David Klemman Meeker. For services to the National Film and Television Archive.
- Bridget Anne Meyer, Higher Executive Officer, Commonwealth War Graves Commission.
- Rolf Meyer. For services to the community in Brixham, Devon.
- Donald John Milburn. For services to the Police and to the community.
- Evelyn May Miller, Administrative Officer, Ministry of Defence.
- Nicholas Charles Miller. For services to People with Alcohol Problems.
- Sheila Denise Miller. For services to the British Tourist Authority.
- Squadron Leader Raymond Mills. For services to the community in Cambridgeshire.
- Ena Montgomery. For services to the community in Chorley, Lancashire.
- Robert Joseph Montgomery. For services to the Meat Industry.
- Kenneth Adams-Morgan. For Political Service.
- Ronald Morgan, Deputy Governor and Head of Custody, Her Majesty's Prison Noranside.
- Richard William Morley, lately Catering Manager, Ring & Brymer (City). For services to the Catering Industry.
- Kathnne Amanda Morris, Clerk to the Corporation, East Birmingham College. For services to Education.
- Donald Fergusson Morrison, District Registrar, Strachur, Argyll. For services to the community.
- Mane Morrow. For services to disabled people.
- Walter Kenneth John Mummery, lately Principal Prison Officer, Her Majesty's Prison and Young Offenders' Institution Moorland.
- Joan F. Munro, Speech and Language Therapy Manager, Highland Communities NHS Trust. For services to Health Care.
- Robert Nathaniel Murray. For services to the community in Derby.
- The Reverend Canon James Robert Musgrave. For services to the community.
- Samuel Newgarth. For services to Music and for charitable services in Dorset.
- Jeanne Marjorie Nicholls, President, Cornwall and Isles of Scilly Leagues of Hospital and Community Friends. For services to Health Care.
- David Edgar Thomas Nichols, Senior Scientific Officer, the Defence Evaluation and Research Agency, Ministry of Defence.
- Mary Nimmons. For services to Health Care.
- The Reverend Canon Richard Henry Norburn. For services to the community in Bury St Edmunds, Suffolk.
- Doreen Norgrove. For services to the community in Farnham, Surrey.
- Sheila Norman, Chairman, Royal Life Saving Society, Suffolk Branch, and Commonwealth Development Liaison Officer, Royal Life Saving Society UK. For services to Life Saving.
- Geoffrey Francis Norris, General Medical Practitioner, London. For services to Medicine.
- Arthur Joseph Nutter. For services to the Lieutenancy in Lancashire.
- John O'Neil, lately Principal Lecturer and Course Leader of PGCE Art and Design, University of Wales Institute, Cardiff. For services to Art Education and Teacher Training.
- Martin Offiah. For services to Rugby Football.
- Enid Rosalind Oliver. For services to the community in Ashford, Kent.
- William James Orford. For services to Cricket in the West Midlands.
- Vera Overs. For services to the community in Martindale, Cumbria.
- Clifford Owen. For services to the Chorley and District Talking Newspaper, Lancashire.
- Pamela Mary Owen. For services to the community, particularly the NHS, in Welshpool, Powys.
- Anthony Gerald Palmer. For services to the War Pensions Committee in East Anglia.
- Sarah Faith, The Honourable Mrs. Palmer. For services to the community, particularly the British Red Cross Society, in Berkshire.
- Isobel Marilyn Park. For services to the Scout Association in Dumfries.
- Gordon Seymour Passmore, Member, London Borough of Wandsworth. For services to Local Government.
- Norman Henry Pattenden, Special Operations Manager, North & South Railways Ltd. For services to the Railways Industry.
- William Evans Pattison. For services to Mountain Rescue.
- Robert John Patton. For services to the Engineering Industry.
- Christine Anne Pendlebury, Personal Secretary, Home Office.
- Philippa Helen Perks. For services to the community in Wrington, Bristol.
- Eleanor Elizabeth Phillips, Personal Secretary to the Archbishop of Canterbury. For services to the Church of England.
- Frank Joseph Phillips. For services to the St. John Ambulance Brigade in Wiltshire.
- Kathleen Patricia Anne Phillips, Management Pay Band 1, the Employment Service, Department for Education and Employment.
- Lilian Jane Helen Phillips, DL. For services to the community in Worthing and West Sussex.
- Jessica Winifred Pickering. For services to Foster Care in Lincolnshire.
- Anne Doreen Piercy, District Nurse, Tring, Hertfordshire. For services to Health Care.
- John Neilson Pirrit, Senior Planning Officer, Inverclyde Council. For services to Local Government.
- Margaret Charlotte Plenderleith, Secretary, Committee of the Benevolent Fund for Nurses in Scotland. For services to the British Red Cross Society.
- John Plummer, lately Senior Messenger, Lord Chancellor's Department.
- Shirley Dorothy Polley, School Crossing Patrol Officer, Surrey County Council. For services to Road Safety.
- Muir John Potter. For services to disabled people in West Sussex and for humanitarian services in Romania.
- Ruby Margaret Pountney. For services to the Citizens' Advice Bureau in Solihull, West Midlands.
- Jean Powell Powell, Pre-Production Engineer (Design Support), ML Lifeguard Equipment Ltd. For services to the Survival Equipment Industry.
- Derek Edward Dowling Prentis. For services to the Royal British Legion in London.
- Mo Price. For services to the community in Stafford.
- Terence Pryor, Management Pay Band 1, the Employment Service, Department for Education and Employment.
- Peggy Pugh. For services to Young People on the Isle of Man.
- Walter Barry Pugh, lately Senior Storekeeper, Ministry of Defence.
- Joyce Winifred Pullen. For services to the Save the Children Fund in Wiltshire.
- Parveen Qureshi, Manager, Rotherham Multi-Cultural Centre. For services to the community.
- David Quinney, Station Officer, Central Scotland Fire Brigade. For services to the Fire Service.
- Ellen Elizabeth Redman. For services to the community in Malmesbury, Wiltshire.
- Cyril Redpath. For services to the Army Cadet Force in Northumbria.
- Lydia Elizabeth Reed, Main Executive, W.J.O. Jennings Ltd. For services to Public Transport.
- Alan Tait Rees. For services to the community in Edinburgh.
- Alistair Reid, Chairman, Scottish Fisherman's Organisation. For services to the Fisheries Industry
- Gwyn Rhydderch, Co-ordinator, British Arts Festivals Association. For services to the Arts.
- Dennis Richards. For charitable services in Penzance, Cornwall.
- Bryan Robert Riches, Sub-Divisional Officer, Suffolk Special Constabulary. For services to the. Police.
- Edmund Caerwyn Roberts. For services to Agriculture in Wales.
- John Aubrey Roberts. For services to the Wrexham Hospital League of Friends, North Wales.
- Moira Mary Ann Robertson, lately Custodian, Skara Brae.
- Eric Robinson. For charitable services in Nantwich, Cheshire.
- Jeremy John Lawrence Robinson, Senior Executive Officer, Ministry of Defence.
- John Robinson, Managing Director, S. Robinson & Sons (Eng.) Ltd. For services to the Construction Industry.
- Frank Rodgers. For services to the Environment in Derbyshire.
- David Gordon Rollo. For services to the Care of Wildlife in Northumberland.
- Walter Wilson Ross, Conductor, Pension Silver Band, East Lothian. For services to Music.
- Charles Routledge, Dresser. For services to the Theatre.
- David Walton Routledge. For services to the community in Hillingdon, Middlesex.
- Harold Rowling. For services to the community in Westmeston, East Sussex.
- Shantilal Hirji Ruparell. For services to the community in Harrow, Middlesex.
- James Edwin Rous Saltonstall. For services to Yachting and to Young People.
- Anne Mary Sankaran. For services to the community in Oldham, Lancashire.
- Peter Saunders, Chairman, Groundwork Trust, Merthyr and Cynon. For services to the Environment.
- Alan Digerson Savage. For services to the Croydon Battle of Britain Memorial and to the Royal Air Force Benevolent Fund.
- John Robert Savage. For services to the community in Southwell, Nottinghamshire.
- Leslie Daniel Sayer, DSM. For services to the Telegraphist Air Gunners' Association.
- Barry Scaplehorn, lately Firefighter, Suffolk County Fire Service. For services to the Fire Services Benevolent Fund.
- Susan Scarsbrook, Head, Sudbourne Primary School, Lambeth, London. For services to Education.
- David Andrew Seaman. For services to Association Football.
- Peter Jonathan Seaman, lately Chief Inspector, Hertfordshire Constabulary. For services to the Police.
- Sukumar Sen. For services to the community in Lochaber.
- Dorothy Sewell. For services to the community in Middlesbrough, North Yorkshire.
- Robert James Shaw. For services to the Fishing Industry.
- Patrick John Sherwin. For services to Coastal Rowing.
- Robert John Shiach, Cattleman. For services to the Cattle Industry in Banffshire.
- William Shiel. For services to Tourism in Northumbria.
- Trevor Royston Shore, Instructor/Examiner, Dorset County Council Cycle Training Scheme. For services to Road Safety.
- Joan Silcox. For charitable services in Newcastle-upon-Tyne.
- Annie Mary Simpson. For services to Education.
- Sylvia Yvonne Simpson. For services to the Police.
- Jean Skinner, School Crossing Patrol Warden, Kent County Council. For services to Road Safety.
- Robert Skinner. For services to the St Andrew's Ambulance Association.
- David Slater. For services to the community in Worksop Nottinghamshire.
- Eileen Lorraine Smart, Administrative Assistant, Department of Trade and Industry.
- Gwenneth Maude Muriel Smewin, lately Headteacher, Dunmore County Infants School, Abingdon, Oxfordshire. For services to Education.
- Barbara Antoinette Smith, Senior Nurse Manager, Leicester General Hospital. For services to Health Care.
- Brenda Smith. For charitable services.
- Carol Beverley Smith, Motor Transport Driver, Ministry of Defence.
- Graham Arthur Smith, Engineering Manager, Secure Products, Siemens Plessey Systems Ltd. For services to Defence Technology.
- John McCrindle Smith, DL. For services to the Magistracy and to the Police Committee in Essex.
- The Reverend Canon John Reginald Smith. For services to the community in Bury, Greater Manchester.
- Pauline Smith. For services to the Citizens' Advice Bureau in Sale, Cheshire.
- Thomas Robert Smith. For services to the community in High Wycombe, Buckinghamshire.
- Stuart Alan Spears. For services to the community in Deal, Kent.
- Anthony William Assheton Spiegelberg, TD, DL. For political service.
- Olive Patricia Stadler. For services to Relate and to Family Mediation in Tyneside.
- Peter Edward Paul Staples, lately Pay Band 11, Her Majesty's Stationery Office.
- Jean Stevenson, Typist/Clerical Assistant, Grange Academy, Kilmarnock. For services to Education.
- Grace Teresa Stewart. For public service.
- John Kenneth Stewart, lately Retained Sub-Officer, Grampian Fire Brigade. For services to the Fire Service.
- Wilfrid Bowring Stoddart. For services to Young People in Runcorn, Cheshire.
- Duncan John Strathdee, Bed and Breakfast Proprietor, Perthshire. For services to Tourism.
- Helen Strathdee, Bed and Breakfast Proprietor, Perthshire. For services to Tourism.
- Leslie Sussman, Member, London Borough of Barnet. For services to Local Government.
- Helena Sutherland. For services to the Royal Bntsh Legion Scotland.
- John Sanderson Swain. For services to Grimsby Hospital, North East Lincolnshire.
- James Edward Keir Tabert, General Medical Practitioner, Luton, Bedfordshire. For services to Medicine.
- Ian Michael Wade Taggart, TD. For services to Sailing for Disabled People.
- David Harris Tanner, Team Leader, Her Majesty's Board of Customs and Excise, and Honorary Chairman of Rex Blind Parties.
- David Anthony Taylor, lately Area Water Quality Manager, National Rivers Authority, Anglian Region. For services to the Environment.
- Carole Anne Terrington. For services to the community in Sundon, Bedfordshire.
- Gwendoline Tew. For services to the community in Llandow, South Wales.
- Keven Verdun Thacker, Chief Executive Officer, the Lighting Association. For services to Domestic Energy Efficiency.
- Noel Thatcher. For services to Athletics for Disabled People.
- Marshall Thew, TD. For charitable and community services in Wirral.
- Gwendoline Marian Thomas, Executive Officer, Department of Social Security.
- John Edwin Thomas, Leading Firefighter, West Midlands Fire Service. For services to the Fire Service.
- Marina Ann Thomas, School Crossing Patrol, Newton Abbot, Devon County Council. For services to Road Safety.
- Martyn Edmund Thomas, Managing Director, Sulzer (UK) Pumps Ltd. For services to the Engineering Industry.
- Kenneth Charles Thompson, Pay Band 8, the Employment Service, Department for Education and Employment.
- Neil Dennis Thompson, Sub-Officer (Retained), Nottinghamshire Fire and Rescue Service. For services to the Fire Service.
- Douglas Albert Till. For services to Training in Worcester.
- Anthony Richard Shaw Timmis. For services to the Building Industry and to the community in Yeovil, Somerset.
- Dawn Pauline Toomey, Higher Executive Officer, Office for National Statistics.
- John Joseph Tovey. For services to Tourism in Cumbria.
- Stephanie Catherine Townsend, Executive Officer, Ministry of Agriculture, Fisheries and Food.
- Rita Trevennen. For services to the Citizens' Advice Bureau in Penzance, Cornwall.
- Arthur George Cecil Trollope. For services to Conservation and to the community in London.
- Doris A. P. Troup, Member, Parkinson's Disease Society, Aberdeen. For services to Health Care.
- Brian Tuckley, Safety Officer, Institute of Food Research. For services to Science.
- Roberta Diane Turley, lately Private Secretary, Nuclear Electric plc. For services to the Electricity Industry.
- Jean Venables, Director, Venables Consultancy Services. For services to Civil Engineering.
- Beryl Vickerton, Clerk, Atwick Parish Council. For services to Local Government.
- Christina Mary Waddell. For services to Victim Support and to Carers of Disabled People in Stirling.
- John Hill Waddell, lately Her Majesty's Inspector of Immigration for Scotland and Northern Ireland, Home Office.
- Peter Waddington. For services to the community in Downton, Wiltshire.
- Ann Cunningham Wagstaff, Executive Officer, Ministry of Defence.
- Geoffrey James George Wakeling, Senior Engineer, Leicestershire County Council. For services to Highways Improvement.
- Graham Basil Walker, Coxswain/Mechanic, Wells Lifeboat, Norfolk. For services to the Royal National Lifeboat Institution.
- Mary Walker, Chairman, General Committee of the Christie Hospital and Holt Radium Institute Women's Trust Fund. For charitable services.
- Nancy Hamilton Walker, Editor, Kinross Newsletter. For services to the community in Kinross-shire.
- Patricia Ann Walker, Valuation Referencer, Board of Inland Revenue.
- Sheila Mary Walker. For charitable services.
- Freda Inez Walley. For services to the community, particularly Prisoner Welfare, in Walsall.
- Valerie Ann Wallis, Vice-Chairman, Young Men's Christian Association. For services to Young People in Kent.
- John Wardrobe. For services to Association Football for Young People.
- Margaret Victoria Ware, Senior Executive Officer, Overseas Development Administration.
- Perween Warsi, Managing Director, S & A Foods Ltd. For services to the Food Manufacturing Industry.
- Robert William Waterson. For services to the community in Norwich, Norfolk.
- Professor Roy Watling, Head of Mycology, Royal Botanic Garden Edinburgh. For services to Science.
- Arthur Aiken Watson. For services to the community in Tarves, Aberdeenshire.
- Dennis Drysdale Watson, Driver, Badgerline Bus Company (Thamesway), Southend, Essex. For services to Public Transport.
- Simon Watts, Chief Scientist, Racal Radar Defence Systems Ltd. For scientific services to the Defence Industry.
- Geoffrey Wingyett Webber, TD. For services to the community on the Isle of Wight.
- Geoffrey Gilbert Wells. For services to the community in Wick, West Sussex.
- Ronald Edward Westacott. For services to the community in Seend, Wiltshire.
- Brenda Maria Wheatley, Support Manager 3, the Buying Agency, Cabinet Office (Office of Public Service).
- The Reverend Derek White. For services to Homeless People in London.
- Marguerite Elizabeth White. For services to the community in Liverpool.
- Derek Frederick Whitehouse. For services to the community in Melton Mowbray, Leicestershire.
- Brian Peter Whitford. For services to the Personnel Protective Equipment Industry.
- Ivan William Whittaker, Craftsman, National Grid Company plc. For services to Industrial Relations.
- Keith Anthony Wicks, Head of Information Technology and Communications, Port of London Authority. For services to the Port Authority.
- Harry Holmes St. John Wild. For services to the community in Rochdale, Lancashire.
- Richard Douglas Williams. For services to Journalism and to the community in Cornwall.
- Edith Frances Williams. For services to the community in Bnslington, Bristol.
- John Michael Williams. For services to the community, particularly the Arts, in Buxton, Derbyshire.
- Lyndhurst Williams, Constable, Metropolitan Police. For services to the Police and to Industrial Relations.
- Richard Williams. For Political Service.
- Roy Williams. For Political Service.
- Thomas Alan Williams, Senior Scientist, Phosphates Group, Albright and Wilson Ltd. For scientific services to the Chemical Industry.
- Grace Ellen Wood. For services to Elderly People in Twerton, Bath.
- Marjorie Wood. For services to the Royal Parks of London.
- Margaret Jane Wooden, School Crossing Patrol, Lancashire County Council. For services to Road Safety and to the community.
- Alfred Thomas Woolnough, Driver, Metropolitan Police. For services to the Police.
- Simon William Wren, lately Higher Executive Officer, Ministry of Defence.
- Madge Margaret Wright. For services to Mentally Handicapped People.
- Fred Yallop, Emergency Engineer. For humanitarian services to the former Yugoslavia.
- Charles Henry Young. For services to the community in South Shields, Tyne and Wear.
- John Ralph Young, Technical Liaison Manager, Lever Brothers Ltd. For services to the Chemical Industry.
- John William Young, Brigade Treasurer, lately Chairman, England and Wales Committee, Boys' Brigade. For services to The Boys' Brigade.

Diplomatic Service and Overseas List

- Bathsheba Abse, Curator, Keats–Shelley Memorial House, Rome.
- Duncan Bnerton Allan, Second Secretary, British Embassy, Moscow.
- Jean Armstrong del Bianco. For services to British cultural interests in Venice.
- Au Chi-lau, JP. For services to civil engineering in Hong Kong.
- Christopher Rodney Baker, Honorary Consul, Dunkirk.
- Sigrid Geraldine Wells Barnes. For charitable services in the Falkland Islands.
- Janet Bershers, British Vice-Consul, Chicago.
- Kenneth Geoffrey Birch, British Vice-Consul, Zurich.
- John Basil Boursot. For services to zoology in El Salvador.
- Chan Kim-to. For public service, Hong Kong.
- Chan Kong-sang. For public service, Hong Kong.
- Peter Chau Cham-chiu, QPM, CPM, Assistant Commissioner (Auxiliary), Royal Hong Kong Police Force.
- Maureen Anne Chesterton, British Vice-Consul, Lima.
- Michael Chik Wah-wai, Assistant Commissioner, Customs and Excise, Hong Kong.
- Mary Matilda Cooper, BEM. For services to nursing and welfare, Montserrat.
- Nicola Jane Crews. For services to disabled people, Indonesia.
- Brendan William Laurence Egan. For services to the British School, Manila.
- Margaret Elsworth. For services to education and health, South Africa.
- John Barrymore Eustice. For services to disabled people, Botswana.
- The Reverend Father Anthony Fleming. For charitable and welfare services to the community in Orissa, India.
- Frank Charles Gamble, Director, British Red Cross Society, Bermuda.
- Christopher Garratt. For services to the British community in Brussels.
- Martin Fraser Gibson. For services to the British community in Uruguay.
- George Oliver Gilham, First Secretary (Works), British High Commission, New Delhi.
- Joan Doreen Gol. For charitable and welfare services in Texas, United States of America.
- Rose Yin-chee Goodstadt, JP. For services to public health and welfare, Hong Kong.
- Louise Elizabeth Higham, Head, British Council Office, Barcelona.
- Marjone Helen Hoare. For services to literature and the island heritage, Gibraltar.
- Ann Hui On-wah. For services to the performing arts, Hong Kong.
- Norman Peter Jackson, Field Director, Save The Children Fund, Khartoum.
- Neil Alexander Kernohan, lately Vice-Consul, British Interests Section, Italian Embassy, Tripoli.
- James Kwan Kin-cheung. For public service, Hong Kong.
- Lee Lai-shan. For services to sport, Hong Kong.
- Andrew Leung Kwan-yuen. For services to the textile industry, Hong Kong.
- Leung Shou-chun, Principal Government Land Surveyor, Hong Kong.
- Li Shai-hung. For public service, Hong Kong.
- Simon Li Pak-ho, JP, Senior Assistant Director of Housing, Hong Kong.
- Sarah Mary Liao Sau-tung, JP. For services to consumer and environmental affairs, Hong Kong.
- Lo Tin-hoi, Management Assistant, British Trade Commission, Hong Kong.
- Dora Amy Logan. For services to the British community, Argentina.
- Fiona MacCallum, Attaché, HM Embassy, Riga.
- Allison Mary Marriott, lately Third Secretary, UK Delegation to the Western European Union, Brussels.
- Tanya Bonsovna Matthews. For services to broadcasting and journalism, Tunisia.
- Florenz Elaine Webbe Maxwell. For services to the Girl Guides and education in Bermuda.
- Alexandra Lynn Medlin, Personal Assistant to British High Commissioner, Cape Town.
- Ian Adie Murray. For services to education in Murree, Pakistan.
- Ng Shui-Lai, JP. For services to welfare, Hong Kong.
- Edward George Pryor, JP, Principal Government Town Planner, Hong Kong.
- Olivia Margaret, Lady Roseveare. For services to education in Malawi
- Tatica Ernestine Scatliffe. For services to nursing and voluntary work in British Virgin Islands.
- Leonard Scott, lately Adviser on English Language, European Commission.
- Josephine Chang Siao Fong-fong. For services to the performing arts, Hong Kong.
- Neville Maxwell Alexander Smith, lately Chief Immigration Officer, Bermuda.
- Robert Soto. For services to Scuba diving, British Virgin Islands
- Edith Margaret Stewart, Matron, Bangkok Nursing Home, Thailand.
- Heather Themistocleous, Headmistress, Junior (Anglo-Cypriot) School, Nicosia.
- David Straiten Thomson. For welfare services to the community, Kenya.
- Valerie Ann Treitlein, Honorary British Consul, Conakry.
- Carlye Wai-Ling Tsui, JP. For services to the community, Hong Kong.
- Valentine Thomas Tudball. For services to the British community in Beirut.
- Michael Julian Christopher Waters, Deputy Political Adviser, Hong Kong.
- John Anthony Weaver. For services to the Anglican community, Sliema, Malta.
- The Reverend Colin Andrew Westmarland. For services to the Church of Scotland, Malta.
- Henry Winston Willans. For services to the British community, Uruguay.
- Angela Cheung Wong Wan Yiu, JP. For services to education and hospital administration, Hong Kong.
- Sister Annie Margaret Wong Kam-lin, Principal, St. Paul's Secondary and St. Paul's Convent Schools, Hong Kong.
- Judy Wong Shuk-ching, JP, Assistant Director of Immigration, Hong Kong.
- James Yeung Chi-kin, Chief Labour Officer, Hong Kong.

=== Order of the Companions of Honour (CH) ===
- Alfred Leslie Rowse. For services to History and Literature.

=== Royal Red Cross (RRC) ===
==== Associate of the Royal Red Cross (ARRC) ====
- Flight Lieutenant Phillipa Jayne Ward (0409397), Princess Mary's Royal Air Force Nursing Service.
- Squadron Leader Hazel Weir (0409276), Princess Mary's Royal Air Force Nursing Service.

=== Queen's Police Medal (QPM) ===
England and Wales

- Anthony Richard Bayliss, Detective Superintendent, Warwickshire Constabulary.
- Frank Joseph Breen, Detective Constable, Thames Valley Police.
- Michael Briggs, Commander, Metropolitan Police.
- Eileen Margaret Eggington, Detective Chief Superintendent, Metropolitan Police.
- Christopher Fox, Assistant Chief Constable (designated), Warwickshire Constabulary.
- William Griffiths, Commander, Metropolitan Police.
- Gareth Jones, lately Detective Superintendent, North Wales Police.
- David Robertson Kenworthy, Assistant Chief Constable (designated), Avon and Somerset Constabulary.
- Paul Joseph Scott-Lee, Assistant Chief Constable (designated), Suffolk Constabulary.
- Roger John Manning, Chief Superintendent, Staffordshire Police.
- Graham Moore, Assistant Chief Constable (designated), Cambridgeshire Constabulary.
- Terence Raymond Nicholls, Constable, Metropolitan Police.
- Robin Edgar Norman Oake, Chief Constable, Isle of Man Constabulary.
- Peter John Picken, Superintendent (Divisional Commander), West Mercia Constabulary.
- Colin Potts, Chief Inspector (Divisional Commander), Greater Manchester Police.
- Gordon Michael Rogers, lately Chief Superintendent, Wiltshire Constabulary.
- Roger Edward Sandall, Chief Superintendent (Divisional Commander), Norfolk Constabulary.
- Richard Owen Thomas, Assistant Chief Constable (designated), Gwent Constabulary.

Scotland

- Andrew Gibson Brown, Assistant Chief Constable, Lothian and Borders Police.
- John Orr, OBE, Chief Constable, Strathclyde Police.
- William Rae, Chief Constable, Dumfries and Galloway Constabulary.

Northern Ireland

- Patrick John Allen, Detective Sergeant, Royal Ulster Constabulary.
- Trevor William Campbell, Detective Inspector, Royal Ulster Constabulary.
- William Joseph Coalter, Sergeant, Royal Ulster Constabulary.

Overseas

- Keith Braithwaite, Chief Superintendent, Royal Hong Kong Police.
- Christopher John Glover, Chief Superintendent, Royal Hong Kong Police.
- Lau Chun-sing, Chief Superintendent, Royal Hong Kong Police.
- William Ian Nicholson, Chief Superintendent, Royal Hong Kong Police.

=== Queen's Fire Services Medal (QFSM) ===
England and Wales

- Peter John Dale, Chief Fire Officer, Staffordshire Fire Service.
- Alan Kenneth Dixon, Assistant Divisional Officer, Cleveland Fire Brigade.
- Kenneth George Monk, lately Chief Fire Officer, Derbyshire Fire Service.
- Alan Keith Seaman, lately Temporary Chief Fire Officer, South Yorkshire Fire Service.

Scotland

- John Clenaghan, Divisional Officer Grade 1, Strathclyde Fire Brigade.
- Alexander James Lobban, Firemaster, Grampian Fire Brigade.

Northern Ireland

- Raymond Moore, Assistant Chief Fire Officer, Northern Ireland Fire Brigade.

Overseas

- Lam Chun-man, Chief Fire Officer, Royal Hong Kong Fire Service.

=== Colonial Police Medal (CPM) ===
- Chan Pak-chi, Superintendent, Royal Hong Kong Police Force.
- Albert Chan Ting-kai, Senior Divisional Officer, Royal Hong Kong Police Force.
- Chan Yun-pui, Senior Divisional Officer, Royal Hong Kong Police Force.
- Cheung Yuk-fung, Superintendent, Royal Hong Kong Police Force.
- Paul Croft, Senior Superintendent, Royal Hong Kong Police Force.
- William Frederick Fenton, Senior Superintendent, Royal Hong Kong Police Force.
- Gillian Suk-han Fletcher, Chief Inspector, Royal Hong Kong Police Force.
- Fu Keung San-ling, Sergeant, Royal Hong Kong Police Force.
- Barry Christopher Griffin, Senior Superintendent, Royal Hong Kong Police Force.
- Tony Ho Tse-tong, Senior Superintendent, Royal Hong Kong Police Force.
- Victor Hsu Yung, Senior Divisional Officer, Royal Hong Kong Police Force.
- Kwan Wa-fai, Station Sergeant, Royal Hong Kong Police Force.
- Lee Yeung-chi, Superintendent, Royal Hong Kong Police Force.
- Leung Ping, Station Sergeant, Royal Hong Kong Police Force.
- Li Chun-wai, Station Sergeant, Royal Hong Kong Police Force.
- Li Kam-wa, Station Sergeant, Royal Hong Kong Police Force.
- Li Mau-sau, Station Sergeant, Royal Hong Kong Police Force.
- Liu Tin-chee, Senior Divisional Officer, Royal Hong Kong Police Force.
- Lo Chan Lin, Station Sergeant, Royal Hong Kong Police Force.
- Kenneth William Colin Mackenzie, Superintendent, Royal Hong Kong Police Force.
- Edward Mak Man-poon, Senior Superintendent, Royal Hong Kong Police Force.
- Martin Samson, Senior Superintendent, Royal Hong Kong Police Force.
- Tam Sum-wing, Station Sergeant, Royal Hong Kong Police Force.
- Tsui Kwok-cheung, Station Sergeant, Royal Hong Kong Police Force.
- Wong Kin-ming, Senior Divisional Officer, Royal Hong Kong Police Force.
- Wong Nang-chong, Station Sergeant, Royal Hong Kong Police Force.
- Yan Fook-mou, Superintendent, Royal Hong Kong Police Force.

== Cook Islands ==
=== Order of the British Empire ===
==== Member of the Order of the British Empire (MBE) ====
Civil Division

- Kopu Brown. For public services, lately as Secretary of the Ministry of Internal Affairs.
- Naomi Iro. For services to the community.

== Bahamas ==
=== Order of Saint Michael and Saint George ===
==== Companion of the Order of St Michael and St George (CMG) ====
- Peter Donald Graham. For services to the civic, economic and political development of the country.

=== Order of the British Empire ===
==== Commander of the Order of the British Empire (CBE) ====
Civil Division

- Kenneth Nathaniel Francis. For services to the print media and the community.

==== Officer of the Order of the British Empire (OBE) ====
Civil Division

- Alexander Leonard Archer. For services to education and trade unionism.
- Thomas Bastain. For services to the trade union movement.
- Leroy Bowe. For services to the economic development of the country.
- Arlington Livingston Miller. For services as a public officer and a trade unionist.

==== Member of the Order of the British Empire (MBE) ====
Civil Division

- Harcourt Thomas Bastian. For services to the economic development of the country.
- Fannie Suzanne Bethel, JP. For services to education and the community.
- Wilton Eric Darville. For services as a public officer and a trade unionist.
- Loretta Minnis. For services to education.
- Lamour Rolle. For community service to the Island of Bimini.
- Felix Nathaniel Stubbs. For services to the community, especially to youth.

=== British Empire Medal (BEM) ===
Civil Division

- Dewitt Carey, JP. For services to the community.
- The Reverend Carlton Alexander Farquharson, JP. For services to the Island of Inagua.
- Rosie Grant. For services to the community.
- Eleazor James Johnson. For services to sailing.
- Captain Hezron Lenox Moxey. For services to sailing.
- Theophilus Neely, JP. For services to the community of South Andros.
- Lindsay Williamson. For services to the community.
- Mildred Williamson. For services to the community.
- Otis Young, JP. For services to South Eleurhera.

== Grenada ==
=== Order of the British Empire ===
==== Officer of the Order of the British Empire (OBE) ====
Civil Division

- Beryl Eunice Ball. For services to education.

==== Member of the Order of the British Empire (MBE) ====
Civil Division

- Christine Lilian David. For services to education.

=== British Empire Medal (BEM) ===
Civil Division

- Cosmos Forrester. For services to agriculture.
- Augustus Williams. For services to the fishing community.

== Papua New Guinea ==
=== Knight Bachelor ===
- Georkios Constantinou, OBE. For services to business and the community.

=== Order of the British Empire ===
==== Knight Commander of the Order of the British Empire (KBE) ====
Civil Division

- Matiabe Yuwi, OBE, JP. For public service and services to the community and politics.

==== Commander of the Order of the British Empire (CBE) ====
Civil Division

- Ereman Kasese Ragi. For services to the savings and loan society.
- Chief Superintendent John Toguata, QPM. For services to the Royal Papua New Guinea Constabulary.

==== Officer of the Order of the British Empire (OBE) ====
Civil Division

- James Kepou. For services to the community and local Government Council.
- Henry Raisi Kila. For services to commerce and the community.
- Tembon Niki. For services to local government.
- Wilson Peni. For services to the community.

==== Member of the Order of the British Empire (MBE) ====
Civil Division

- Inspector Joe Arukai. For services to the Royal Papua New Guinea Constabulary.
- Sister Joseph Mary Cresp. For services to charity.
- Bamaga Morre Imari. For services to the community, public service and the government.
- Justin Hansu Kill. For services to broadcasting.
- Sally Mokis. For services to the Papua New Guinea Banking Corporation.
- Membup Paril. For public services and services to the community.
- Cecilia Ropa. For services to health and the community.
- Noki Timbil. For services to the community.

=== British Empire Medal (BEM) ===
Civil Division

- Waim Apa. For services to the community.
- Alup Apita. For services to education.
- Trombo Ekka. For services to the community, church and government.
- Sen Hegame. For services to politics and the community.
- Sergeant Major Stephen Iboni. For services to the Royal Papua New Guinea Constabulary.
- Bubu Japjap. For services to the government.
- Mark Vevehere Kupare. For services to local government.
- Mauri Samson. For public service.
- Haukas Ateal Somolo. For services to the community.
- Saman Tinpis. For service to the government.

=== Queen's Police Medal (QPM) ===
- Chief Superintendent Frederich Sheekiot, Royal Papua New Guinea Constabulary.

== Solomon Islands ==
=== Order of the British Empire ===
==== Officer of the Order of the British Empire (OBE) ====
Civil Division

- The Honourable Reverend Michael Maeliau, MP. For services to the church, the community and politics.

== Tuvalu ==
=== Order of the British Empire ===
==== Officer of the Order of the British Empire (OBE) ====
Civil Division

- Tauaasa Taafaki. For services to the Government and public services.

==== Member of the Order of the British Empire (MBE) ====
Civil Division

- Sotaga Paape. For services to education and the community.
- Filoimea Telito. For community and public services, especially to education.

=== British Empire Medal (BEM) ===
Civil Division

- Vinaka Ielemia. For public services, especially to education.

== Saint Lucia ==
=== Order of Saint Michael and Saint George ===
==== Knight Commander of the Order of St Michael and St George (KCMG) ====
- The Right Honourable John George Melvin Compton. For public service.

== Saint Vincent and the Grenadines ==
=== Order of the British Empire ===
==== Officer of the Order of the British Empire (OBE) ====
Civil Division

- Israel James Bailey. For public service.
- Alphonso Alpheus Dennie. For community service.

== Belize ==
=== Order of the British Empire ===
==== Member of the Order of the British Empire (MBE) ====
Civil Division

- Zebedee Augustus Pitterson. For services to the community.
- Jean Urcilla Shaw, JP. For public services.

== Antigua and Barbuda ==
=== Order of Saint Michael and Saint George ===
==== Companion of the Order of St Michael and St George (CMG) ====
- Ronald Michael Sanders. For service in the Diplomatic Corps.

=== Order of the British Empire ===
==== Member of the Order of the British Empire (MBE) ====
Civil Division

- Gerard Earl Emanuel Benjamin. For services to banking, business and the community.

=== British Empire Medal (BEM) ===
Civil Division

- Vincere Jean-Marie Bachelor. For public service.

== Saint Christopher and Nevis ==
=== Order of the British Empire ===
==== Officer of the Order of the British Empire (OBE) ====
Civil Division

- St. Clair Alston Phillip. For services to public auditing and national security.

==== Member of the Order of the British Empire (MBE) ====
Civil Division

- Ann Eliza Liburd. For services to the community.
- Lucille Irene Louisy-Walwyn. For services to health.
