= World Gourmet Summit =

The World Gourmet Summit is an annual culinary event held in Singapore, which started in 1997. Its objective is to showcase dining in Singapore and promote local chefs while featuring Michelin-starred chefs and vintners from around the world. It is organised by a La Carte Productions, a division of Peter Knipp Holdings Pte Ltd, and the Singapore Tourism Board (STB).

== Events at World Gourmet Summit ==
The World Gourmet Summit consists of events like culinary masterclasses, gourmet safaris, vintner and celebrity dinner, as well as the charity dinner. These events take place at various establishments and venues across Singapore, mainly the five-star hotels and top-rated restaurants participating in the event.

The World Gourmet Summit showcases the work of chefs and vintners. It is organised by A La Carte Productions, a division of Peter Knipp Holdings Pte Ltd.

For organizing the bean feast, the World Gourmet Summit claims to have picked up some gongs, including the Grand Pinnacle Silver Award at the International Festivals and Events Association (IFEA) / Haas & Wilkerson Pinnacle Awards.

Highlights of the Summit include:

=== Charity Dinner ===
The World Gourmet Summit Charity Dinner has been a regular event of the World Gourmet Summit since 2001, and features the cuisine of a participating masterchef. Approximately S$2.9 million had been raised from 2001 to 2010 through the event, with proceeds going to social service programs supported by Community Chest (ComChest), a fund-raising division of Singapore's National Council of Social Service.

The 13th World Gourmet Summit Charity Dinner in 2013 has raised S$551,888 to support the social programmes of ComChest, benefitting more than 80 charities in Singapore.

These programs include enabling children with special needs, reaching out to youths-at-risk, providing support to elderly, assisting families in need, and helping those with disabilities.

Over 360 diners and guest-of-honor Dr Ng Eng Hen, Singapore's Defense Minister, attended the dinner at The Fullerton Hotel on 18 April 2013. International Masterchef Gabriele Ferron from Italy, known to many as the World Ambassador of Rice, prepared a five-course dinner together with Chef Le Bihan (Group Executive Chef of Déliciae Hospitality Management) and the culinary team at The Fullerton Hotel Singapore led by Executive Chef Andrea Sacchi.

Funds were raised through table sales, cash donations, silent and live auctions held during the dinner. The Charity Dinner is usually held during the first week of the World Gourmet Summit.

=== Culinary Masterclasses ===
The culinary masterclasses are hosted by MasterChef's attending the World Gourmet Summit. The master chefs will demonstrate the preparation of two to three of their signature dishes, followed by the sampling of these dishes by attendees of the workshop.

== World Gourmet Series ==
Inaugurated in 1997 as part of Singapore Tourism Board's initiative to establish Singapore as a premier culinary destination, the World Gourmet Summit has successfully evolved into the World Gourmet Series (WGS). Encompassing a series of events such as the Wine & Restaurant Experience, Awards Of Excellence and World Gourmet Summit, WGS has more than 140,000 attendees over the past 17 years.

Each year, cooks arrive in Singapore to whip up nosh for gluttons.

=== World Gourmet Summit 1998 ===
The second World Gourmet Summit was held in July 1998 at the Fort Canning Park. The summit was held as part of the Singapore Food Festival. Eight overseas chefs were invited to conduct masterclasses and also an eight-course grand finale dinner.

=== World Gourmet Summit 1999 ===
The third World Gourmet Summit was held independently of the Singapore Food Festival in July 1999. 11 celebrity chefs were invited to the summit.

=== World Gourmet Summit 2011 ===
In celebration of its 15th anniversary, World Gourmet Summit 2011 (held from 25 April 2011 to 8 May 2011) featured chefs such as Dietmar Sawyere, Rachel Allen, Edward Kwon, Michael Ginor, Brent Savage, Andrew Turner and Paul Wilson.

The festival also showcased a strong Asian presence with participation from China, India, Japan and Korea. Other than celebrity chef Edward Kwon, diners consumed food whipped up by masterchef Yim Jung Sik, Tam Kwok Fung, Manish Mehotra, Keisuke Matsushima, Shinichiro Takagi and Yuki Wakiya.

=== World Gourmet Summit 2013 ===
The 17th World Gourmet Summit (held from 16–26 April 2013) had chefs including Bo Lindegaard & Lasse Askov (Denmark), Gabriele Ferron (Italy), Jean-François Piège (France), Matt Moran (Australia), Paco Torreblanca (Spain) and Yannick Alléno (France).

Anchored on the theme Artisans & The Art Of Dining, the show kicked off with Singapore's pioneer national culinary awards programme, the World Gourmet Series Awards Of Excellence, on 16 March 2013.

Since its inception in 2001, the World Gourmet Series Awards Of Excellence has recognised leading food and beverage (F&B) professionals like André Chang, who walked off with KitchenAid Chef Of The Year award in 2012.

=== World Gourmet Summit 2014 ===
The World Gourmet Summit revived the classics on 26 March until 5 April 2014.

== Awards and accolades ==
In 2012, the World Gourmet Summit received five gold and two bronze Pinnacle Awards by the International Festivals and Events Association (IFEA) / HAAS Wilkerson Pinnacle Awards Competition. Each year, the IFEA recognises accomplishments and creative, promotional, operational and community outreach programs and materials produced by festivals and events around the world, with the Haas & Wilkerson Pinnacle Awards Competition.

The awards include:

Gold: Best Event Newsletter, Best Supplier (Resorts World Sentosa), Best Cover Design, Best Street Banner and Best Program within An Event to Benefit a Charity for its Charity Dinner benefitting over 80 charities in Singapore

Bronze: Best New Event for Citibank Gastronomic Jam Sessions and Best Miscellaneous Printed Materials

The World Gourmet Summit 2013 won 13 Pinnacle Awards by the International Festivals and Events Association (IFEA)/ HAAS Wilkerson Pinnacle Awards Competition. A total of 5 Gold, 6 Silver and 2 Bronze awards were received, which is almost double the number of awards received from the year before. The Gold Awards won include: "Best New Event", "Best Promotional Brochure", "Best Miscellaneous Printed Materials", "Best Single Magazine Display Advertisement", and "Best Street Banner".

In July 2013, the World Gourmet Summit was named "Best Food Event of 2013" by I-S magazine's 18th Readers' Choice Awards.

In Oct 2013, the World Gourmet Summit was also awarded Best Venue Experience (Bronze) by The Marketing Events Awards 2013.
