= Rolf Schild =

German-born British-based businessman

Rolf Schild OBE (18 May 1924 - 14 April 2003), was a German-born, British-based businessman, a Jewish refugee from Nazi Germany who formed the company Huntleigh Technology, based in Luton, which manufactured and designed medical equipment.

== Early life and education ==
He was born in Cologne on 18 May 1924and was educated at the Jawne Gymnasium.

Rolf Schild came to Britain in May 1939. He later learned his parents were gassed to death by the Nazis in Chelmno in 1942.

He later developed a talent in medical engineering, and in the early 1950s formed his own company, SE Technology, later to become Huntleigh.

== Kidnapping ==
Schild is perhaps best remembered for being a victim of a notorious kidnapping, with his wife and daughter, by a gang while on holiday in Sardinia in 1979. He was released 16 days later; his wife was set free in January 1980, and his daughter in March of that year. 500 million lire (£220,000 at the time) was paid in ransom money for his wife and daughter after the Pope issued a personal appeal.

Two years later, 13 people were found guilty of the crime and were jailed.

== Awards ==
He was awarded an OBE in 1997 New Year Honours and the German Order of Merit for his contribution to Anglo-German relations.
