= Gavin Henderson =

English arts administrator (born 1948)

Gavin Douglas Henderson (born 3 February 1948) is an English arts administrator, conductor and trumpeter. Between 2007 and 2020 he was principal of the Royal Central School of Speech and Drama at the University of London.

He was involved in controversy in 2018 when, during a debate at the event Dear White Central, he suggested that the introduction of diversity quotas at the school could constitute a 'risk'. He resigned on 12 June 2020 over the school's failure to tackle racism and comments he made in 2018, admitting that they were racist.

== Biography ==
Gavin Henderson was educated at Brighton College, where his father was a member of the teaching staff, Brighton College of Art, Kingston Art College, University College London and the Slade School of Fine Art. From 1985 to 2010 he was the Artistic Director of Dartington International Summer School. From 1983 to 1994 he was the Artistic Director of Brighton International Festival. From 1994 to 2005 he was principal of Trinity College of Music (TCM), where he was responsible for moving TCM to its new premises in the Old Royal Naval College at Greenwich and for its merger with Laban (a nearby school of contemporary dance) to form Trinity Laban.

He has also been Chairman of the National Foundation for Youth Music, Chairman of the Arts Council of England's Music Panel, Vice President of the British Arts Festivals Association and the European Festivals Association, Governor of Chetham's School, Manchester and Chairman of Arts Worldwide/World Circuit Arts. He is currently Honorary President of the National Piers Society.

He was appointed CBE in the 2004 Birthday Honours.
