= Robert Shanks (pharmacologist) =

British pharmacologist (born 1934)

Robert Gray Robin Shanks CBE (born 4 April 1934) is a British retired clinical pharmacologist, specialising in Beta adrenergic blocking drugs. He was made a Commander of the Order of the British Empire (CBE) in the 1997 New Year Honours, For Services to Medicine.

Shanks was the first person to give a beta blocking drug (DCI, dichloroisoprenaline) to a person in 1961/62 to study its effects on cardiovascular responses to catecholamines and stress. Jointly with Sir James Black (Nobel Prize winner in 1988) he discovered the beta-blocking drug, propranolol, in 1962. In 1964 he classified beta adrenergic receptors in beta one and beta two and as a result developed the first drug (practoLol) to selectively block beta one receptors. Subsequently he spent 30 years studying the properties and clinical pharmacology and clinical use of beta blocking and other cardiovascular drugs.

He published many research articles on beta blockers during his tenure at Queens University Belfast.

He was elected a Member of the Royal Irish Academy (MRIA) in 1986

He was Pro-Vice-Chancellor from 1991 to 1997 and acting Vice-Chancellor in 1998 of Queens University Belfast. Since his retirement in 1998 he has been Emeritus Whitla Professor of Therapeutics and Pharmacology, Queens University Belfast.
