= Neil Blair =

British diplomat and equerry

Captain Robert Neil Blair CVO was Private Secretary and Treasurer to The Duke of York from 1990 to 2001.

Blair was born in 1936, and educated at St John's College, Johannesburg, and Britannia Royal Naval College, Dartmouth. He served in the Royal Navy from 1954, and was on the RAF staff course.

From 1958 to 1959, he was on HMY Britannia. He served in various positions in the Fleet Air Arm 1961–1970, and was in command of HMS Shavington 1965–1967.

In 1970–71, he was again on HMY Britannia. He was promoted to Commander 31 December 1971. He was Commanding Officer of the frigate HMS Ashanti 1972–1974.

Blair was in command of HMS Royal Arthur in 1978, and Commander of Britannia Royal Naval College, Dartmouth 1979–1980, and was promoted to Captain 30 June 1981. From 1982 to 1985 he was Naval and Air Attaché in Athens, and Defence and Naval Attaché in The Hague 1986–1989.

He was appointed was Private Secretary and Treasurer to the Duke of York in 1990, and was also an Extra Equerry. He was Comptroller to Princess Alexandra, The Hon Lady Ogilvy 1996–1997, and Private Secretary since 1996.

He was appointed Lieutenant of the Royal Victorian Order (LVO) in the 1997 New Year Honours, and promoted to Commander of the Royal Victorian Order (CVO) in the 2001 New Year Honours.
