= International Festivals and Events Association =

Trade association based in Idaho, United States

Logo of the International Festivals and Events Association

The International Festivals and Events Association (IFEA) is a not-for-profit association for producers, suppliers and managers of festivals and events, which range from small county and municipal events to large-scale parades that can have attendances in the hundreds of thousands.

== History ==
The IFEA was founded in 1956, and adopted its current name in the 1980s. It is based in Boise, Idaho, United States. It has members in nearly 30 different countries in 8 global regions.

The IFEA puts on a yearly international convention and expo for its members. The most recent convention and expo took place in Pittsburgh, Pennsylvania in September 2024. The IFEA also offers several educational courses which can lead to the professional designation of Certified Festival and Events Executive (CFEE).

== Awards ==
The association presents the annual Haas & Wilkerson Pinnacle Awards to members in Gold, Silver and Bronze to the top three of each category. In 2010, the Pasadena Tournament of Roses received 6 awards, 2 in gold, 3 in silver and one bronze.

== See also ==
- British Arts Festivals Association
