= Anne Wright (academic administrator) =

British academic and academic administrator

Anne Margaret Wright CBE (born 26 July 1946) is a British academic and academic administrator.

She was educated at King's College London (BA English, 1967; PhD, 1970). She was a Lecturer in English at Lancaster University from 1969 to 1971 then Senior Lecturer in Modern English at Hatfield Polytechnic (now the University of Hertfordshire) from 1971 to 1984. She served as Vice Chancellor of the University of Sunderland from 1992 to 1998. She was Chair of the National Lottery Commission 2005 to 2013. She was made a CBE in 1997.
