= Clive Harrod Smee =

British economist (1942–2019)

Professor Clive Harrod Smee BSc, MBA, CB. (29 April 1942 - 26 December 2019) was a British economist. He was Chief Economic Adviser and Director of Operational Research, Department of Health from 1984 to 2002.

== Early life ==
Smee was born on 29 April 1942 and was the son of Victor Woolley Smee and Leila Olive Smee (née Harrod). In 1975 he married Denise Eileen Sell and went on to have three children and three grand children.

He was educated at Guildford Grammar School and graduated from London School of Economics with a BSc in economics, before moving to the United States of America to complete a Master of Business Administration from Kelley School of Business at Indiana University Bloomington.

== Career ==
Smee was an international expert in health economics who worked in the British National Health Service, the Ministry of Health in New Zealand, and the United States Public Health Service. He was a visiting professor at the Surrey Health Economics Centre at the University of Surrey and published a book about his time as Chief Economic Adviser and Director of Operational Research for the Department of Health called Speaking Truth to Power. He is perhaps best known for his work to ban tobacco advertising in the UK, which resulted in a significant reduction in smoking related illness and mortality and paved the way for the smoking ban in public places.

"The most recent comprehensive review of the evidence was undertaken by the Department of Health and its chief economic advertiser, Dr. Clive Smee. The Smee report found that tobacco advertising affected total consumption, not just brand share. There were 68 statistically significant results which pointed to a connection between advertising spending and tobacco consumption and only two indicating the opposite. The report also found that countries with stronger controls on advertising for the purpose of protecting public health and not trade monopolies tended to have lower consumption of tobacco. The report found that, in individual countries, the balance of evidence based on a study of the relationship between advertising spending and consumption over time showed that advertising had a positive effect on consumption. When enough detailed evidence was gathered for a proper study, it was found that in four countries, advertising bans--excluding the effects of other factors--produced a significant drop in consumption. In Canada, tobacco consumption fell by 4 per cent., in New Zealand by 5.5 per cent., in Finland by 6.7 per cent., and in Norway by 9 per cent."

Mr. Kevin Barron MP (Rother Valley)

"I am sure that my hon. Friend is aware that, in the conclusion to the report, Clive Smee, the Government chief health economist, said :"The balance of evidence thus supports the conclusion that advertising does have a positive effect on consumption." He reviewed the position in other countries and concluded : "In each case the banning of advertising was followed by a fall in smoking on a scale which cannot reasonably be attributed to other factors." "

Mr. Hugh Bayley MP (York)

Over the course of his career, Clive Smee advised numerous British government Ministers and Prime Ministers, including Margaret Thatcher, Virginia Bottomley, John Major, and Tony Blair on the economic issues associated with health care policy. In January 2000, when Prime Minister Tony Blair made a live television announcement that he would increase health spending in the UK to bring it up to EU levels, it was Clive Smee who was called on to establish the cost implications. The decision had not been agreed by the Chancellor, Gordon Brown, resulting in frantic Sunday morning calls from Number 10 Downing Street to Clive Smee and Treasury officials to resolve the matter

Smee advised The Kings Fund, The University of York, and The Nuffield Trust and written for the Health Economics Journal. Areas for which he is particularly renowned include the measurement of productivity in health care, patient choice, the banning of tobacco advertising, and successfully identifying academic research that could be grafted onto policy – such as QALYs.

Honours and awards In 1997 Smee was recognised in the New Year Honours and made a Companion of the Order of the Bath (CB) for his work to advance healthcare

Preceded by David Pole (economist)	Chief Economic Adviser to the Department of Health; Department of Health; 1984–2002	Succeeded by Chris Mullin
