= Roger Holloway =

Roger Graham Holloway OBE (24 November 1933 – 31 October 2010) had many occupations during a colourful life, including: soldier, big game hunter, international wine and spirit merchant and Anglican priest. He was the youngest of six children of a civil servant. His family had a military tradition.

He was brought up in Blackheath, London and educated at Eastbourne College. For National Service, he was a platoon commander in Kenya during the emergency. After that, he was assistant to a professional big game hunter.

He then went to Selwyn College, Cambridge to study Theology with a view to ordination. However, he had difficulties with his faith at that time and joined Pfizer as a salesman and brand manager. In 1960, he moved to the advertising agency Robert Sharp and Partners running the Players and Unilever accounts. In 1963, went into the wine business of Charrington United Breweries Group (later Bass Charrington). He then moved to Jardine Matheson where, from 1982 to 1988, he was the managing director of wines and spirits. This was one of the most profitable divisions of Jardine Matheson, with the majority of its revenues derived from sales to Japan. Holloway lived in Japan for some years and developed the Japanese division for Jardine's.

Meanwhile, he had been ordained in 1981, as a protégé of Robert Runcie. In Asia, in addition to his work with Jardine Matheson, he served as honorary chaplain at St. John's Cathedral (Hong Kong), as honorary assistant at St. Andrew's Cathedral, Tokyo, and as Episcopalian Chaplain at the US military base at Camp Zama.

In 1988, he settled in London and became a full-time priest at St Margaret's, Westminster and also appeals director of the Imperial Cancer Research Fund and Director of the Industrial Christian Fellowship. In 1997, he was elected Preacher to Gray's Inn, continuing until his death. Also in 1997, he was appointed OBE "for services to the whisky industry". With this description, The Queen was surprised to see him in clerical dress.

He married in 1962, Anne Alsop, who survives him with three sons and a daughter.
