= ArjoHuntleigh =

Global medical technology company

Arjo
- Industry: Medical technology
- Founded: 1957
- Founder: Arne Johansson
- Headquarters: Malmö, Sweden
- Products: Patient handling equipment, medical beds, pressure ulcer prevention systems, wound care products, DVT and VTE prevention devices, disinfection and diagnostic equipment
- Revenue: €700 million

Arjo is a global medical technology company with an annual turnover of approximately €700 million, and 4,200 employees, serving the needs of acute and long-term care. The company produces medical equipment for patient handling and hygiene, medical beds and pressure ulcer prevention, wound healing, DVT & VTE prevention, disinfection and diagnostics

== History ==
=== Arjo ===
Arjo was founded in 1957 by Arne Johansson in the Swedish town of Eslöv. The company name consists of the first two letters of the first and last name of the company founder. Arjo initially functioned as a supplier of components and machine parts to medical device manufacturers. In 1972, the company developed the first height-adjustable bathtub and introduced it to the market. In 1993, the company's shares are listed on the Stockholm Stock Exchange and the London Stock Exchange.

In 1995, the company merged with the Swedish Getinge Group, in whose "Extended Care" business area it continued to operate under its brand name.

In 2004, Arjo took over the company BHM Medical and rounded off its range of passenger lifts with its Ceiling Lifts.

=== ArjoHuntleigh ===
2007 sees the merger of Arjo and Huntleigh Nesbit Evans (HNE). Luton is now the headquarters of ArjoHuntleigh International Ltd.

==== About Huntleigh Nesbit Evans (HNE) ====
In 1969, the Flowtron Aire Ltd, the predecessor of Huntleigh Healthcare, was founded in Luton in 1975 that of the Huntleigh Group Ltd. In 1985 the company's IPO took place as a Huntleigh Technology PLC at the London Stock Exchange. In 1993 Huntleigh took over the Nesbit Evans Group and operated as HNE HUNTLEIGH NESBIT EVANS.

=== Arjo ===
In 2018, Arjo was spun off from Getinge Group as a separate listed company. The company headquarter moved to Malmö/Sweden
