= Anthony Seaton =

Anthony Seaton CBE FRCP FRCPE FMedSci (born 1938) qualified in medicine from University of Cambridge in 1962, and after training in Liverpool was appointed assistant professor of medicine at the West Virginia University School of Medicine in 1969. He became consulting chest physician at the University of Wales in 1971, and was named director of the Institute of Occupational Medicine at Edinburgh in 1978. Seaton became the head of the Department of Environmental and Occupational Medicine at the University of Aberdeen in 1988 and on retiring in 2003 became emeritus professor. He continues to write and teach and has active research interests in the causes of asthma and occupational illness.

Anthony Seaton is a co-author of numerous publications and books including: Practical Occupational Medicine, Occupational Lung Diseases and Crofton and Douglas's Respiratory Diseases. He has been president of the British Thoracic Society (1999-2000), was editor of Thorax (1977–82) and has served on Committee on Medical Effects of Air Pollution for the Department of Health, Industrial Injuries Advisory Council, Royal Society and Royal Academy of Energy Working Group on Nanoscience, NERC Research Advisory Committee on Human Health and Environment, and was chairman of the Expert Panel on Air Quality Standards from 1992 to 2002. He was appointed a Commander of the Order of the British Empire (CBE) in the 1998 New Year Honours, is a Fellow of the Academy of Medical Sciences and the Institute of Contemporary Scotland, and has an honorary DSc from Aberdeen University and the medal of the British Thoracic Society.

In 2018 he published Farewell King Coal: from industrial triumph to climatic disaster, an account of the history of coal and its involvement in causing air pollution and climate change.
