= British Arts Festivals Association =

The British Arts Festivals Association (BAFA) is the national membership body for Arts Festivals in the UK.

== History ==
The British Arts Festivals Association was founded in December 1969 at the behest of Arts Council England to provide expertise on the festival sector. By the early 1980s it became an open membership organisation and now includes amongst its members larger festivals including Edinburgh International Festival and Brighton Festival as well as volunteer-run festivals including Frome Festival and Proms St Judes.

In 2000 BAFA commissioned 'Festivals Mean Business' (FMB), the first impact study into the UK arts festivals sector. FMB was designed to demonstrate the economic and cultural contribution that festivals make to the UK and was updated in 2002/3 and in 2007/8.

== Activities ==
Each year the association organises a range of events available to both its members and the wider sector. These include a series of afternoon seminars in March/April/May - the Spring Road Show, an occasional series of Single Interest workshops and an annual Conference for Festivals which is held in a different place in the UK each year.

The 2010 conference was held in Brighton whilst the 2011 conference was in Leicester. In 2012 the Conference was held in London at the Barbican where the main theme was 'Capacity to Endure' In 2013 the Annual Conference was held in Edinburgh at the Scottish Storytelling Centre with the main theme 'What's the Point of Festivals' In 2014 the conference was in Canterbury. Subsequent conferences have been held in Lichfield (2015), Hull (2016), Bath (2017), Birmingham (2018) and London (2019).

== See also ==
- Arts festivals
