= 2001 New Year Honours =

British royal recognitions

The 2001 New Year Honours List is one of the annual New Year Honours, a part of the British honours system, where New Year's Day, 1 January, is marked in several Commonwealth countries by appointing new members of orders of chivalry and recipients of other official honours. Awards for 2001, announced on 30 December 2000, included the United Kingdom, New Zealand, the Cook Islands, Barbados, Grenada, Papua New Guinea, Saint Vincent and the Grenadines, Belize and Saint Christopher and Nevis.

== United Kingdom ==
=== Privy Counsellor ===
- Tessa Ann Vosper, Baroness Blackstone, Minister of State, Department for Education and Employment.
- Keith John Charles Bradley, M.P., Member of Parliament for Manchester, Withington. Treasurer of H.M. Household (Deputy Chief Whip).
- Wyvill Richard Nicolls Raynsford, M.P., Member of Parliament for Greenwich and Woolwich. Minister of State, Department of the Environment, Transport and the Regions.
- Elizabeth Conway, Baroness Symons of Vernham Dean, Minister of State, Ministry of Defence.

=== Knight Bachelor ===
- Nicolas Bevan, C.B., Speaker's Secretary, House of Commons.
- Professor Leszek Krzysztof Borysiewicz, Professor of Medicine, University of Wales. For services to Medical Research and Education.
- Stanley William Clarke, C.B.E. For services to the community in Staffordshire.
- Ronald Cohen, Chairman, Apax Partners and Co. For services to the Venture Capital Industry.
- Thomas Daniel Courtenay, Actor. For services to Drama.
- Edward Michael Crew, Q.P.M., Chief Constable, West Midlands Police. For services to the Police.
- Robert Paul Culpin, Managing Director, Budget and Public finances, H.M. Treasury.
- Professor Christopher Thomas Evans, O.B.E. For services to the Bioscience Industry.
- Andrew William Foster, Controller, Audit Commission. For services to Local Government and to the NHS.
- Alasdair MacLeod Fraser, C.B., Q.C. For services to the Criminal Justice System.
- Professor Christopher John Frayling, Rector and Vice Provost, Royal College of Art. For services to Art and Design Education.
- Barry Trevor Jackson, Surgeon and President, Royal College of Surgeons. For services to Training and Education in Surgery.
- Richard Cornelius MacCormac, C.B.E., Architect. For services to Architecture.
- Clive Haydn Martin, O.B.E., T.D., D.L., lately Lord Mayor of London. For services to the Corporation of London.
- David McMurtry, C.B.E., Chief Executive, Renishaw plc. For services to Design and Innovation.
- Duncan Michael, Chairman of Trustees, Ove Arup Partnership. For services to Engineering and Construction.
- Patrick Alfred Caldwell Moore, C.B.E. For services to the Popularisation of Science and to Broadcasting.
- John Orr, O.B.E., Q.P.M., Chief Constable, Strathclyde Police. For services to the Police.
- Thomas John Parker, Group Chairman, Babcock International. For services to the Defence and Shipbuilding Industries.
- Charles Pollard, Q.P.M., Chief Constable, Thames Valley Police. For services to the Police.
- Steven Geoffrey Redgrave, C.B.E. For services to Rowing.
- Peter Levin Shaffer, C.B.E., Playwright. For services to Drama.
- Professor Christopher Hubert Llewellyn Smith, F.R.S., Provost and President, University College London. For services to Particle Physics.
- John Edward Sulston, F.R.S., lately Director, Sanger Centre. For services to Genome Research.
- Professor Christopher John White, C.V.O. For services to Art History.

Diplomatic and Overseas List

- David Martin Brown. For services to British industry.
- Dr Anthony John Francis O'Reilly. For long and distinguished service to Northern Ireland.

=== Order of the Bath ===
==== Knight Grand Cross of the Order of the Bath (GCB) ====
- Air Chief Marshal Sir Peter Squire, K.C.B., D.F.C., A.F.C., A.D.C., Royal Air Force.
- Sir Richard (Thomas James) Wilson, K.C.B., Secretary of the Cabinet and Head of the Home Civil Service.

==== Knight Commander of the Order of the Bath (KCB) ====
- Lieutenant General Timothy John Granville-Chapman, C.B.E., late Royal Regiment of Artillery.
- Air Marshal Malcolm David Pledger, O.B.E., A.F.C., Royal Air Force.
- Roger Tustin Jackling, C.B., C.B.E., Second Permanent Secretary, Ministry of Defence.
- Christopher William Kelly, Permanent Secretary, Department of Health.

==== Companion of the Order of the Bath (CB) ====
Military Division

- Rear Admiral John Chadwick.
- Rear Admiral Brian Benjamin Perowne.
- Major General Christopher George Callow, O.B.E., late Royal Army Medical Corps.
- Major General Andrew Peter Ridgway, C.B.E., late Royal Tank Regiment.
- Major General Timothy John Sulivan, C.B.E., late The Blues and Royals.
- Air Vice-Marshal Steven Mark Nicholl, C.B.E., A.F.C., Royal Air Force.
- Air Vice-Marshal David Miller Niven, C.B.E., Royal Air Force.

Civil Division

- Donald Brereton, Director, Department of Social Security.
- Paul Britton, Deputy Head, Economic and Domestic Secretariat, Cabinet Office.
- Jonathan Stephen Cunliffe, Director, Monetary Policy and International Finance Directorate, H.M. Treasury.
- Philip John Davies, Parliamentary Counsel, Office of the Parliamentary Counsel.
- Richard Hillier, Director of Resources and Planning, Health and Safety Executive, Department of the Environment, Transport and the Regions.
- William Alexander Jeffrey, Political Director, Northern Ireland Office.
- John Michael Legge, C.M.G., Principal Establishment Officer, Ministry of Defence.
- David Robert Ritchie, Regional Director, Government Office for the West Midlands.
- Rosalind, Mrs Wright, Director, Serious Fraud Office.

=== Order of St Michael and St George ===
==== Knight Grand Cross of the Order of St Michael and St George (GCMG) ====
- Sir Peter John Goulden, K.C.M.G., Permanent Representative, UKDEL NATO, Brussels.

==== Knight Commander of the Order of St Michael and St George (KCMG) ====
- Dr Arthur Richard Jolly. For long and distinguished service to international development.
- Derek John Plumbly, C.M.G., H.M. Ambassador, Riyadh.
- Nigel Elton Sheinwald, C.M.G., Permanent Representative, UKREP, Brussels.
- The Right Reverend Simon Barrington-Ward, Prelate, Order of Saint Michael and Saint George.

==== Companion of the Order of St Michael and St George (CMG) ====
- Andrew John Fraser, lately Chief Executive, Invest UK, Department of Trade and Industry.
- John David Gould Isherwood. For services to OXFAM.
- Peter Humphreys Kent. For services to Anglo-Taiwanese trade.
- Patrick John Széll, Director and Head, International Environmental Law Division, Department of the Environment, Transport and the Regions.
- Miss Alyson Judith Kirtley Bailes, H.M. Ambassador, Helsinki.
- Anthony Russell Brenton, Director, Foreign and Commonwealth Office.
- Andrew Thomas Cahn, lately Chef de Cabinet, European Commission.
- Professor Ivor Norman Richard Davies, For services to Central European history.
- Miss Caroline Myfanwy Tonge Elmes, H.M. Ambassador, Luanda.
- Professor Michael Leifer. For services to UK-South East Asian relations.
- Helen Meixner (Mrs Jack Thornton), Regional Director Central Europe, British Council.
- John McLeod Scarlett, O.B.E., Counsellor, Foreign and Commonwealth OYce.
- Andrew William Graham Summers. For promotion of the excellence of UK design internationally.
- Derek James Alexander Taylor. For services to UK-Mauritius trade.
- Philip Lloyd Thomas, lately H.M. Consul-General, Düsseldorf.
- Jeremy Walter Thorp, H.M. Ambassador, Bogota.

=== Royal Victorian Order ===
==== Knight Grand Cross of the Royal Victorian Order (GCVO) ====
- Sir Brian Henry McGrath, K.C.V.O., lately Treasurer to Duke of Edinburgh.

==== Knight Commander of the Royal Victorian Order (KCVO) ====
- Vice Admiral Sir James Lamb Weatherall, K.B.E., Marshal of the Diplomatic Corps.

==== Commander of the Royal Victorian Order (CVO) ====
- Fiona Violet, Lady Aird, L.V.O., Lady in Waiting to Princess Margaret, Countess of Snowdon
- Captain Robert Neil Blair, L.V.O., Royal Navy, Private Secretary to Duke of York and Princess Alexandra, the Honourable Lady Ogilvy
- John Francis Jarvis, C.B.E., lately Chairman of the Trading Board, The Prince's Trust
- Peter Hugh Trevor Mimpriss, Member of Council, The Prince's Trust
- The Lady Angela Mary Rose Oswald, L.V.O., Lady in Waiting to Queen Elizabeth The Queen Mother

==== Lieutenant of the Royal Victorian Order (LVO) ====
- Eric Percival Carr, lately Honorary Treasurer and Trustee of The Prince Philip Trust Fund for the Royal Borough of Windsor and Maidenhead.
- Miss Sandra Iris Henney, lately Press Secretary to The Prince of Wales.
- Miss Rachel Anne Wells, M.V.O., Assistant Secretary, Central Chancery of the Orders of Knighthood.

==== Member of the Royal Victorian Order (MVO) ====
- Michael William Bourke, Financial Controller, Property Services and Royal Travel, Royal Household.
- Patrick Stanley Michael Coles, Administrator, Western Provident Association.
- Sergeant Paul Leslie Crisp, Royalty Protection Department, Metropolitan Police.
- Sergeant Derek Victor Cross, Royalty Protection Department, Metropolitan Police.
- Allison Sharaon Patricia Derrett, Assistant Registrar, Royal Archives, Royal Household.
- Michael David Fawcett, Personal Consultant to The Prince of Wales.
- Norma, Mrs Gardiner, lately Assistant Secretary to the Lieutenant Governor of Guernsey.
- Peter John Godwin, Deputy Property Manager, Windsor Castle.
- Inspector Charles James John Gouldsmith, lately Royalty Protection Department, Metropolitan Police.
- Roger Francis Tollemache Halliday, Land Steward, Western District, Duchy of Cornwall.
- Elizabeth Jill, Mrs. Kelsey, Assistant Registrar, Royal Archives, Royal Household.
- Graham John Laywood, lately Building Surveyor, Duchy of Cornwall.
- The Honourable Mary Yull MacKie, lately Personal Assistant to the Commonwealth Secretary-General.
- Sister Catherine Teresa O'Donnell, Nursing Sister, Buckingham Palace.
- Alexandra Shân, Mrs Pettifer. For services to The Prince of Wales.
- Maree Elizabeth, Mrs Smith, Private Secretary to the Governor General of Australia.
- Miss Dorothy Kathleen Ann Woolridge, Personal Assistant to the Governor General of Australia.

==== Bar to the Royal Victorian Medal (Silver) (RVM) ====
- Christopher Frederick Biggs, R.V.M., Foreman
- David Hugh Farrow, R.V.M., Tractor Driver, Sandringham Estate.
- Anthony Vernon Parnell, R.V.M., Foreman, Sandringham House.
- Ashley John Sadler, R.V.M., Motor Mechanic, Sandringham Estate.

==== Royal Victorian Medal (Silver) (RVM) ====
- Gerald Shaun Alexander, Assistant Storekeeper, Crown Estate, Windsor.
- Michael Stanley Ashton, Craftsman Fitter, Crown Estate, Windsor.
- Constable Harold William Chappell, Royalty Protection Department, Metropolitan Police.
- John William Christian, Yeoman Bed Goer, The Queen's Body Guard of the Yeomen of the Guard.
- Peter Donald, Works Department, Balmoral Estate.
- Corporal of Horse Kenneth Reginald Freeman, The Queen's Orderly.
- Stephen Richard Frohawk, Tractor Driver, Sandringham Estate.
- Constable Stanley Highmore, Royalty Protection Department, Metropolitan Police.
- Ian Laurence King, lately Pipe Major to Queen Elizabeth The Queen Mother.
- Ian Cooper Masson, Forestry Department, Balmoral Estate.
- Gerald Andrew Morriss, lately Show Ground Manager, Royal Windsor Horse Show.
- Graham Paul Richards, Chef to Queen Elizabeth The Queen Mother.
- Ronald John Smith, Works Supervisor, Mechanical and Engineering, Property Services, Buckingham Palace.
- Roger John Tyack, Divisional Sergeant Major, The Queen's Body Guard of the Yeomen of the Guard.
- Dennis Thomas Williams, Messenger Sergeant Major, The Queen's Body Guard of the Yeomenof the Guard.

=== Order of the Companions of Honour (CH) ===
- Sir Harrison Birtwistle, Composer. For services to Music.
- David Paul Scofield, C.B.E., Actor. For services to Drama.

=== Order of the British Empire ===
==== Dame Commander of the Order of the British Empire (DBE) ====
- Miss Jill Ellison, Nursing Director, Birmingham Heartlands and Solihull NHS Trust. For services to Nursing.
- Miss Jean Else, Headteacher, Whalley Range High School, Manchester. For services to Education (honour revoked in February 2011).
- Miss Sharon Hollows, Headteacher, Calverton Primary School, Newham, London. For services to Education.
- Miss Thea King (Mrs Thurston-King), O.B.E., Clarinettist. For services to Music.
- Ms Sally Ann Vickers Powell, Member and Deputy Executive Mayor, London Borough of Hammersmith and Fulham. For services to London and to Local Government.
- Mary, Mrs Richardson, lately Principal, Convent of Jesus and Mary Language College, Brent. For services to Education.
- Miss Janet Olive Trotter, O.B.E., Director, Cheltenham and Gloucester College of Higher Education. For services to Higher Education.

==== Knight Commander of the Order of the British Empire (KBE) ====
- Vice Admiral Fabian Michael Malbon.

==== Commanders of the Order of the British Empire (CBE) ====
Military division

Navy

- Commodore Adrian James Johns, Royal Navy.
- Surgeon Captain Michael Atholl Farquharson-Roberts, Royal Navy.
- Commodore Malcolm Stephen Williams, Royal Navy.

Army

- Colonel Michael John Dent, M.B.E. (503659), late Royal Corps of Signals.
- Brigadier Christopher Michael Steirn (495237), late The Royal Logistic Corps.

Air Force

- Air Commodore Ronald Cook, Royal Air Force.
- Air Commodore Raymond James Horwood, O.B.E., Royal Air Force.
- Group Captain John William White, Royal Air Force.

Civil division

- Miss Jennifer Abramsky, Director, BBC Radio and Music. For services to News and Radio Broadcasting.
- Sidney Edmond Jocelyn Ackland, Actor. For services to Drama.
- Mahbubuddin Ahmad, Chair, Millat Asian Housing Association. For services to the community in South London.
- George Haylock Almond, M.B.E., D.L., County Fire Officer and Chief Executive, Greater Manchester County Fire Service. For services to the Fire Service.
- Richard John William Alston, Choreographer and Artistic Director, The Place and Richard Alston Dance Company. For services to Dance.
- Colin Angus Barnes, Non-executive Director, British Airways. For services to Aviation.
- John Beacham. For services to the Chemical Industry.
- Godfrey Gilbert Bevan, Director, Energy Technologies, Department of Trade and Industry.
- Professor Kenneth George Binmore, Director, ESRC Centre for Economic Learning and Social Evolution. For services to Social Science.
- Robin Michael Black, Chemist, Defence Evaluation and Research Agency, Ministry of Defence.
- Julian Blogh, Chief Executive, Ultra Electronics. For services to the Defence and Aerospace Industries.
- James Everett Brathwaite, Chairman, Business Link Sussex. For services to the Economy in Sussex.
- John Stuart Bridgeman, T.D., D.L., lately Director General of Fair Trading. For services to Consumers.
- Elizabeth Jane, Mrs. Brooks, lately Executive Director, Dyslexia Institute. For services to Education.
- Alan Roy Brown, Director for Scotland, Employment Service, Department for Education and Employment.
- John Richard Browning, lately Managing Director, Bristol Water Holdings plc. For services to the Water Industry.
- Ian James Graham-Bryce, lately Principal and Vice Chancellor, University of Dundee. For services to Higher Education and to Research.
- Professor Grahame Bulfield, Director and Chief Executive, Roslin Institute (Edinburgh). For services to Animal Genetics.
- Patrick Moubray Cadell, Keeper of the Records of Scotland, Scottish Executive.
- Clive Thomas Cain, Quality Director, Defence Estates, Ministry of Defence.
- Felicity, Mrs. Clarkson, lately Head, Young Offenders Group, Home Office.
- Geoffrey Copeman, D.L., Vice Chairman, Eastern Counties Newspapers Group. For services to the Newspaper Industry.
- Patricia Ann, Mrs. Cross, Headteacher, St John's Church of England Primary School, Huddersfield, West Yorkshire. For services to Education.
- Andrew Cubie. For services to Business and the community in Scotland.
- Geoffrey Court Dart, Chief Executive. For services to the Navy, Army and Air Force Institutes.
- John Richard Christopher Davies, Director of Social Services, Somerset County Council. For services to Social Services.
- Professor Nicholas Edward Day, MRC Research Professor. For services to Statistics and Epidemiology underpinning Cancer Biology.
- Edward Ralph Dexter. For services to Cricket.
- Professor Patrick Joseph Dowling, Vice Chancellor and Chief Executive, University of Surrey. For services to Business/Academic Links.
- Martin Dru Drury, For services to Conservation.
- Ms Helen Edwards, Member, New Deal Task Force. For services to Unemployed People and Ex-Offenders.
- Jonathan David Edwards, M.B.E. For services to Athletics.
- Elwyn Owen Morris Eilledge, Chairman, Financial Reporting Advisory Board. For services to Financial Accounting.
- Ursula Askham Fanthorpe, Poet. For services to Literature.
- Ms Amanda Jane Finlay, Director, Public and Private Rights Directorate, Lord Chancellor's Department.
- Professor Michael Richard Daniell Foot, T.D., Historian. For services to the Official History of the SOE.
- Edward Patrick Gallagher, Chief Executive, Environment Agency. For services to the Environment.
- Ian James Galloway, Chairman, Scotbeef Ltd. For services to the Beef Industry.
- William Dennis Glass. For Public Service.
- Alexander Muncie Gold, Director, Scottish Chambers of Commerce. For services to Industry and Business.
- Ms Wilhelmina Barns-Graham, Painter. For services to Art.
- Professor Andrew Graves. For services to Competitiveness in Industry.
- Professor David Lawrence Hamblen, Chairman, Greater Glasgow Health Board and Emeritus Professor of Orthopaedic Surgery, University of Glasgow. For services to the NHS.
- Rosemary Katherine, Mrs. Hamilton. For services to Higher Education.
- Margaret, Mrs Harrison, O.B.E. For services to Home-Start and to Support for Families.
- Professor John Lawrence Head, Member, Nuclear Safety Advisory Committee. For services to Nuclear Safety.
- Jacqueline, Mrs. Henderson, Chief Executive, National Council, Training and Enterprise Council. For services to Education and Training.
- Miss Bronwyn Hill, Divisional Manager, Department of the Environment, Transport and the Regions.
- Miss Judith Eileen Hill. For Public Service.
- Ralph Noel Hodge, Chairman, Enron Europe Ltd. For services to the Power Generation and Gas Industries.
- Michael Jolly, Chairman, Tussauds Group. For services to Tourism.
- Robert Wynne Jones, Chair, East Midlands Regional Assembly. For services to Local Government in the East Midlands.
- William Kenwright, Stage and Film Producer. For services to the Theatre and to Film.
- Nicholas Roger Kenyon, Controller, BBC Proms, Live Events and TV Classical Music. For services to Music and Millennium Broadcasting.
- Professor Rudolf Ewald Klein, Emeritus Professor of Social Policy, University of Bath. For services to Health Services Research.
- Richard Kornicki, Head, Performance and Strategic Management Unit, Policing and Crime Reduction Group, Home Office.
- Professor Parveen June Kumar, Professor of Clinical Medical Education, Consultant Physician and Gastroenterologist, Barts and the London NHS Trust. For services to Medicine.
- Professor Lance Edward Lanyon, Principal, Royal Veterinary College. For services to Veterinary Education and Science.
- Richard Neville Lay, lately Chairman, DTZ. For services to the Property Profession.
- Richard Charles Leese, Leader, Manchester City Council. For services to the community and to Local Government.
- Thomas William Anthony Little, lately Chief Executive, Veterinary Laboratories Agency, Ministry of Agriculture, Fisheries and Food.
- Douglas Brian Liversidge, lately Project Director, Regional Innovation Strategy. For services to Industry.
- Professor Ann Lomas Loades, Professor of Divinity, University of Durham. For services to Theology.
- Geoffrey Loades, Chair, Norfolk and Waveney Training and Enterprise Council. For services to Training and Enterprise.
- Thomas William Logan, Collector, H.M. Board of Customs and Excise.
- Michael John Lowe, J.P., D.L., President, Shropshire Chamber of Commerce, Training and Enterprise. For services to Education, Training and Business Support.
- Colin MacKay, lately President, Royal College of Physicians and Surgeons of Glasgow. For services to Medicine.
- John Makinson, Finance Director, Pearson Group. For services to Public Sector Productivity.
- Professor David Melville, Chief Executive, Further Education Funding Council. For services to Education.
- Adrian Montague, Deputy Chairman, Partnerships UK. For services to the Private Finance Initiative.
- Richard Louis Ormond, lately Director, National Maritime Museum. For services to Museums.
- Ms Anne Elizabeth Owers, Director, Justice. For services to Human Rights.
- Susan Marie, Mrs. Page, Chief Executive, Northumbria Healthcare NHS Trust. For services to the NHS.
- Graham Edward Parkinson. For services to the Stipendiary Bench and to the Administration of Justice.
- Geraldine, Mrs. Peacock, Chair, Association of Chief Executives of Voluntary Organisations. For services to the Voluntary Sector.
- Matthew Pinsent, M.B.E. For services to Rowing.
- John Pope, Chief Executive, North West London Hospitals NHS Trust. For services to Health Care.
- Professor Michael Alexander Pringle, Chairman of Council, Royal College of General Practitioners. For services to Medicine.
- Barry Quirk, Chief Executive, London Borough of Lewisham. For services to Local Government.
- Professor David William Rhind, Vice Chancellor, City University. For services to Geographical and Social Sciences.
- Professor Michael Adrian Richards, National Cancer Director. For services to Cancer and Palliative Medicine.
- Miss Joan Rodgers, Singer. For services to Opera.
- David John Roe, lately Head, Financial Regulatory Reform Team, H.M.Treasury.
- Hazel Joy, Mrs. Rollins, Nutrition Nurse Specialist, Luton and Dunstable Hospital, Bedfordshire. For services to Nursing.
- John Francis Rourke, Principal, St. Charles Catholic Sixth Form College, Kensington and Chelsea, London. For services to Education.
- John Scampion, Social Fund Commissioner for Great Britain and Northern Ireland. For services to the Independent Review Service.
- Julian Robert Seymour. For public services.
- Professor Wilson Sibbett, Professor of Physics and Director of Research, University of St Andrews. For services to Science.
- Douglas Sinclair, Chief Executive, Fife Council. For services to Local Government.
- Christopher Henry Sporborg. For charitable services.
- Miss Jane Vivienne Stokes, Treasury Legal Adviser, Treasury Solicitor's Department.
- David Ivor Macpherson Sutherland, Registrar, General Teaching Council for Scotland. For services to Education.
- Edward Nicholas Tate, lately Chief Executive, Qualifications and Curriculum Authority. For services to Education and to Training.
- Robert Sydney Tinston, Regional Director, NHS Executive, Department of Health.
- Miss Bridget Ellen Towle, Chief Guide and UK and Commonwealth Chief Commissioner. For services to Guiding.
- Patricia Ann Troop, Deputy Chief Medical Officer, Department of Health.
- Robin Anthony Vincent, Circuit Administrator, Court Service Agency, Lord Chancellor's Department.
- Robert Ward, Senior Civil Servant (Legal), Ministry of Defence.
- Miss Fay Weldon, Author. For services to Literature.
- Professor Geoffrey Whittington. For services to the Accounting Standards Board.
- Michael James Wilford, Architect. For services to Architecture.
- Miss Susan Margaret Wilson. For services to Economic Development in North East England.

Diplomatic and Overseas List

- Michael Harrington Dale. For services to British commercial interests, North America.
- Lyndon Rees Evans. For services to accelerator physics.
- The Honourable Mr. Justice Gerald Michael Godfrey, lately Justice of Appeal, Hong Kong, Special Administrative Region.
- Eric Edward Hotung. For services to British charitable interests overseas.
- John Alexander Kennedy. For services to UK-Latin American trade.
- The Honourable Mr. Justice Henry Denis Litton, O.B.E., Q.C., lately Judge, Hong Kong, Special Administrative Region.
- Leopold Nathaniel Mills II. For public service, Bermuda.
- Michael Shears. For services to international trade and trade development strategy.
- Ljubo Franjo Sirc. For services to the promotion of democracy in Central and Eastern Europe.

==== Officers of the Order of the British Empire (OBE) ====
Military division

Navy

- Commander Christopher Alcock. Royal Navy.
- Captain Leslie Michael Coupland, Royal Fleet Auxiliary.
- Captain John Kenneth Covell, Royal Navy.
- Commander Peter Norman Payne-Hanlon, Royal Navy.
- Commander Michael Dennis-Jones, Royal Navy.
- Commander Robert Nairn, Royal Navy.

Army

- Lieutenant Colonel Jonathan Harold Clough (493696), The Royal Logistic Corps.
- Lieutenant Colonel Christopher Eldred Comport, T.D. (505386), Royal Regiment of Artillery, Territorial Army.
- Lieutenant Colonel Douglas Eric Cook (510299), The Royal Logistic Corps.
- Lieutenant Colonel Martin Charles Frostick (499701), Corps of Royal Electrical and Mechanical Engineers.
- Lieutenant Colonel Richard Lewis Hall, M.B.E. (504459), The Royal Gloucestershire, Berkshire and Wiltshire Regiment.
- Colonel John Richard Hennessy (519305), late Corps of Royal Engineers, Territorial Army.
- Colonel Catherine Jane Kitchener (503280), late Adjutant General's Corps (StaV and Personnel Support).
- Lieutenant Colonel Andrew Dutton Mason (503873), The Parachute Regiment.
- Colonel Philip Dermot McEvoy (514357), late Adjutant General's Corps (Army Legal Services).
- Lieutenant Colonel John Adrian Ris (481851), Corps of Royal Engineers.
- Lieutenant Colonel David Ian Aubrey Spackman (480402), The Royal Regiment of Fusiliers.
- Lieutenant Colonel Robert William Hamilton Sutcliffe (509220), The Royal Yeomanry, Territorial Army.

Air Force

- Wing Commander David Clive Coombes (8023560B) Royal Air Force.
- Wing Commander Barbara Cooper (8032068L) Royal Air Force.
- Wing Commander Martin James Engwell (4231539Q), Royal Air Force.
- Wing Commander Mark Adrian Jeffery (2630144E), Royal Air Force.
- Wing Commander Stephen Long (5205113M), Royal Air Force.
- Wing Commander Christopher Andrew Murray (8108403P), Royal Air Force.
- Wing Commander Paul Nash (5202785Y), Royal Air Force.
- Wing Commander Jonathan Colton Rigby (5205228J), Royal Air Force.

Overseas

- Lieutenant Colonel Patrick MacIntyre Outerbridge, E.D., The Bermuda Regiment.

Civil division

- Hazel, Mrs. Abbott, lately Headteacher, St. Cuthbert with St. Matthias Church of England Primary School, Kensington and Chelsea, London. For services to Education.
- Richard John Adams. For services to the Promotion of Ethical Trading.
- David Adlington, Pay Band F, Lord Chancellor's Department.
- Professor Peter John Aggett. For services to the Advisory Committee on Novel Foods and Processes.
- Morag, Mrs. Alexander, Director, Equal Opportunities Commission, Scotland. For services to Equal Opportunities.
- Captain Colin George Allen. For services to the National Historic Ships Committee.
- Eileen, Mrs. Anderson, Headteacher, Carreghofa Primary School, Powys. For services to Education.
- Miss Rowena Arshad, Director, Centre for Education for Racial Equality in Scotland. For services to Race Equality.
- Alison, Mrs. Austin, Head, Environmental and Technical Communications, J Sainsbury plc. For services to the Environment and to Sustainable Development.
- David Brian Baker, Archaeologist. For services to the conservation of the Historic Environment.
- John Joseph Ballance, Project Manager, Wellcome Wing. For services to the Science Museum.
- Maureen, Mrs. Bampton, Headteacher, Erddig Nursery School, North Wales. For services to Education.
- Ms Caroline Mary Barker. For services to Videcom and to Small and Medium Businesses in China.
- Murray Barnes, T.D. For Public Service.
- William Jeffery Bartlett, lately Director-General, Paper Federation of Great Britain. For services to the Paper Industry.
- John Michael Beaumont, Seigneur. For services to the community on Sark.
- Elaine, Mrs. Bedford, lately Operations Director, English Tourist Board. For services to Tourism.
- Andrew Collings Beer, Principal Establishment and Finance Officer, Government Actuary's Department.
- Sewsunker Awath-Behari, J.P. For services to the community in Wolverhampton, West Midlands.
- Miss Floella Benjamin, Chairman, BAFTA. For services to Broadcasting.
- Donald John Bennet, lately Chairman, Scottish Rights of Way Society. For services to Countryside and Mountain Access.
- David Hywel Bennett, lately Principal, Sackville Community College, East Grinstead, West Sussex. For services to Education.
- Stephen Hamilton Best. For services to Industry, Enterprise, Education and Training in Gwent.
- Professor Helen Bevan, Redesign Director, National Patients' Access Team. For services to the NHS.
- Bimal Kanti Bhowmick, Consultant Physician. For services to Geriatric Medicine in Wales.
- Peter Giles Biddle, Principal, P. G. Biddle Arboricultural Consultants. For services to Arboriculture and to the Environment.
- Miss Dorothy Birchall. For services to the League for the Exchange of Commonwealth Teachers.
- Matthew Christopher Bourne, Choreographer and Artistic Director, Adventures in Motion Pictures. For services to Dance.
- Professor Brian Arthur Bridges. For services to the Cellular Effects of Radiation.
- Geoffrey Brindle, lately Grade 7, Home Office. Captain James Armour Brown, R.D. For services to the Order of St John in Scotland.
- John Logan Ian Brown, Officer in Charge, H.M. Board of Inland Revenue.
- Pearl Holmes Brown, Chief Executive, Riverside Community Health Care Trust. For services to Health Care in London.
- Michael John Bunce, lately Executive Director, Royal Television Society. For services to Broadcasting.
- Michael Howard Butler. For services to the Mineworkers' Pension Scheme.
- Ian Charles Canadine. For services to the Institute of Logistics and Transport.
- Jacqueline, Mrs. Cannon, Director of Research, Construction Forecasting and Research Ltd. For services to the Construction Industry and to the Housing Sector.
- Professor Barry Carpenter, Principal/Chief Executive, Sunfield Independent Special School. For services to Children with Special Educational Needs.
- Helen, Mrs. Carroll, Special Needs Midwife, South Manchester NHS Trust. For services to Homeless Women.
- Miss Sally Cartwright, Publishing Director, HELLO! For services to the Periodical Publishers' Association.
- Andrew John Cash, Chief Executive, Northern General Hospital NHS Trust. For services to Health Care.
- Sylvia Christine, Mrs. Cave, National Vice-President, Girls' Brigade in England and Wales. For services to Young People.
- William Henry Rymer Cayton, Chief Executive, Alzheimer's Society. For services to People with Dementia.
- Frederick Chambers, J.P. For services to the Royal Naval Association.
- Reginald Chapman, Principal, Blackpool and the Fylde College, Lancashire. For services to Further Education.
- Rakesh Chopra, General Medical Practitioner, Northumberland. For services to Health Care.
- Victor George Spencer, Viscount Churchill. For services to the Church of England's Central Board of Finance.
- Andrew George Clark, Nuclear Safety and Quality Director, Devonport Management Ltd. For services to the Defence Industry.
- Professor Leslie Arthur Clark, Professor of Structural Engineering, University of Birmingham. For services to Structural Engineering Research.
- John Jeremy Cockburn, Operations Director, Canada, BAe Systems. For services to the Defence Industry.
- Margaret MacFarlane, Mrs. Collinson, J.P. For services to Agriculture and to the community.
- Calum Munro Colvin, Artist/Photographer. For services to the Visual Arts.
- Frederick Comber, Consultant, RSPCA. For services to Animal Welfare.
- Timothy John Connolly, Chairman, Connolly Leather Ltd. For services to the Leather Tanning Industry.
- Marilyn Ann, Mrs. Cooke, H.M. Inspector of Schools, Office for Standards in Education. For services to Education, particularly the improvement of Schools.
- John Cullen. For services to Dentistry.
- Alan Cunningham, Grade B2, Ministry of Defence.
- Professor Charles David Curtis, Chairman, Radioactive Waste Management Advisory Committee. For services to Environmental Protection.
- Professor Stanley Dagg. For services to Waste Management.
- Margaret Frances, Mrs. Dalton, Farmer. For services to Agriculture and to the community in Ceredigion.
- Aman Dalvi, Chief Executive, Ujima Housing Association. For services to Housing.
- Jim Davidson, Entertainer. For charitable services.
- Professor Bleddyn Pryce Davies, lately Director, Personal Social Services Research Unit. For services to Social Science and Policy.
- Richard Gordon Derwent, Grade 1B, Meteorological Office, Ministry of Defence.
- Margaret Watt, Mrs. Dick. For services to the Institute of Chartered Foresters.
- Thomas Andrew Divers, Chief Executive, Lanarkshire Health Board. For services to the NHS in Scotland.
- Geoffrey Arnold Dobson. For services to the Association of Chief Officers of Probation.
- Thomas Bernard Docherty, General Medical Practitioner, County Durham. For services to Health Care.
- Robert Dover, Grade 6, Department of Social Security.
- John Alan Drew, Branch Crown Prosecutor, Crown Prosecution Service.
- Angus Dunphy, Headteacher, Fitzalan High School, Cardiff. For services to Education.
- John Charles Neville Dyckhoff, Director of Catering, Metropolitan Police Service. For services to the Police and the Hospitality Industry.
- Geoffrey Morton Edmondson. For services to Schools' Sport.
- Ann, Mrs. Elliott, Headteacher, Horton Grange County First School, Blyth, Northumberland. For services to Education.
- Anita Georgina, Mrs. English, Director, Thames Valley Enterprise Board. For services to Training for Disadvantaged People.
- David Meirion Evans, lately General Secretary, Prison Officers' Association. For services to Employment Relations.
- Dennis Henry Evans, Grade 7, Home Office.
- Gillian, Mrs. Farnsworth, District Manager, Employment Service, Department for Education and Employment.
- Robert Thomas Ferris. For services to the Fishing Industry.
- Robert William Foot, Grade B2, Ministry of Defence.
- Clara, Mrs. Freeman, Chairman, Opportunity Now. For services to Women in the Workforce.
- Mary Ellen Eugenie, Lady Fretwell, Chairman, Passports for Pets. For services to Pet Owners and to Animal Welfare.
- Professor Erwin Gabathuler, F.R.S. For services to Physics.
- Denis Patterson Galway. For services to the Harbour Industry.
- Ian Malcolm Gardiner, Deputy Director General, National Farmers' Union. For services to Agriculture.
- Alan Garner, Author. For services to Children's Literature.
- Stephen Cokayne Gibbs, Member, Deer Commission for Scotland. For services to Deer Management.
- John Martin Gill, Chief Scientist, RNIB. For services to Information Technology for Partially Sighted People.
- Professor Lynn Faith Gladden. For services to Chemistry.
- Donald Grant, Q.F.S.M., Commandant, Scottish Fire Service Training School.
- Roger Greenaway, Composer. For services to Popular Music.
- Miss Patricia Mary Greenhalgh. For services to Evidence Based Medical Care.
- Miss Miriam Greenwood, D.L., Director and Chief Operating Officer, British Linen Advisers. For services to Corporate Finance.
- Peter Leslie Griffin. For services to School Governors in Cardiff.
- Laurence David Gruer, Member, Advisory Council on the Misuse of Drugs, and Scottish Advisory Committee on Drug Misuse. For services to Public Health Medicine.
- Peter Gurney, Officer in Charge, H.M. Board of Inland Revenue.
- Miss Elizabeth Ann Gyngell, Head of Division, Health Directorate, Health and Safety Executive, Department of the Environment, Transport and the Regions.
- David John Haines, Managing Director, Warwickshire Careers Service. For services to Young People and to Employers.
- Miss Barbara Ann Hakin, Chief Executive, Bradford South and West Primary Care Trust. For services to the NHS.
- Ian Hamer, J.P., Chair, Air Transport Users' Council. For services to Air Travellers.
- David John Harper, M.V.O., Chief Fire Officer, Royal Berkshire Fire and Rescue Service. For services to the Fire Service.
- Keith William Harwood, Grade 7, Department of the Environment, Transport and the Regions.
- Reatha Rachel, Mrs. Hassan. For services to the community.
- Ian Hay, Chief Executive, Scottish Association of Master Bakers. For services to Vocational Education and Training.
- Maurice Eugene Healy, Chairman, Insurance Ombudsman Bureau Council. For services to Consumers.
- Miss Katherine Anne Henderson, Principal Auditor, National Audit Office.
- Harold Derek Hepworth, J.P. For services to the Administration of Justice in Sheffield, South Yorkshire.
- Derek John Higgins. For services to the community, especially Young People in Essex.
- David Hirst, Engineering Director, Wardle Storeys. For services to the Defence Industry.
- Miss Claire Alison Holder, Chief Executive, Notting Hill Carnival Trust. For services to the Arts.
- Ms Diana Holland, National Organiser for Women, Race and Equalities, TGWU. For services to Equal Opportunities in Employment.
- Martin Hopkins. For services to Sports Broadcasting.
- Graham Wallis John Hoskin, Investigation Officer, H.M. Board of Inland Revenue.
- Miss Ruth Mary Hussey, Director of Public Health, Liverpool Health Authority. For services to Health Care.
- Jocelyn Elizabeth Anne Imrie. For services to the NHS in Scotland, especially Cervical Screening.
- Professor Eric William Ives. For services to History and to the University of Birmingham.
- Thomas Owen Leslie Jenkins, Secretary, European Union and International Relations, Trades Union Congress. For services to Employment Relations in the European Union.
- Peter Simon Jenkinson, Director, Walsall Museums and The New Art Gallery. For services to Museums and to Art.
- David Rowland John. For services to Education.
- Gail Beverley, Mrs. Johnson, Family Centre Co-ordinator, Widden Primary School, Gloucester. For services to Education.
- Alun Denry Wynn Jones, Chief Executive, Institute of Physics. For services to the Defence Industry.
- Christine Jane, Mrs. Jones. For services to the Oil and Gas Industry.
- Timothy John Cooper-Jones, Project Director, Unilever. For services to the Food Industry.
- Trevor Chave Jones, lately Grade B1, Ministry of Defence.
- Peter John Jordan, Chairman, Pilgrim NHS Trust. For services to the community in Boston, Lincolnshire.
- Michael John David Keatinge, Head, Architecture Branch, Department for Culture, Media and Sport.
- Lynda, Mrs. Keith, Head of Private Office, NHS Executive, Department of Health.
- James Keith Killby. For services to Anglo-Italian Relations through the Monte San Martino Trust.
- Joan Elizabeth Laing. For services to the British Red Cross Society in Herefordshire and Worcestershire.
- Brian Lamb. For services to disabled people.
- Charles Peter Lamb, lately Grade 7, Department for Education and Employment.
- Gerald Lanchin. For services to Consumers.
- Jonathan William Miles Lane. For services to Water Aid.
- John Jeffrey Lavin, Deputy Director, Royal Botanic Gardens, Kew. For services to Conservation through the Millennium Seed Bank Project.
- Miss Susan Lawley. For services to Television and Radio Broadcasting.
- Shek-Yung Lee. For services to the Chinese Community.
- Miss Denise Lewis, M.B.E., For services to Athletics.
- Angus Roderick MacKay, Unit Manager, Orchard Lodge, London. For services to Young Offenders.
- Donald Mackenzie MacKay, Member, Comhairle Nan Eilean Siar. For services to Local Government and to the community in the Western Isles.
- Ms Susan MacQueen. For services to Infection Control Nursing at Great Ormond Street Hospital for Children, London and Overseas.
- Robert James Magee. For services to the Food and Drink Industry.
- Ms Stella Manzie, Chief Executive, West Berkshire Council. For services to Local Government.
- Douglas Brown McArthur. For services to the Radio Advertising Bureau.
- Andrew McCully, Divisional Manager, Department for Education and Employment.
- William Duncan McInnes. For services to Youth Basketball.
- Ian McKinlay, Consultant Paediatric Neurologist. For services to disabled people.
- Veronica Beverley, Mrs. McLaughlin, Headteacher, Leith Walk Primary School, Edinburgh. For services to Primary Education.
- Alan McQuillan. For services to the Police.
- Adrian Metcalfe. For Services to Sport.
- Greville John Mitchell. For charitable services on Guernsey and overseas.
- Alan Francis Morgan. For services to the Welsh Development Agency.
- Raymond James Mullan. For services to Education.
- Petronella Joy, Mrs. Mwasandube, Deputy Director of Nursing, Heatherwood and Wexham Park Hospitals, Berkshire. For services to Ethnic Minority Patients and Staff.
- Raymond Nash, District Manager, Thameside, Employment Service, Department for Education and Employment.
- Elizabeth, Mrs. Dunbar-Nasmith. For services to the Soldiers', Sailors' and Airman's Families Association in Moray and Banffshire.
- Richard John Nelmes, Professor, University of Edinburgh and Senior Visiting Fellow at CLRC. For services to Science.
- Michael Noble. For services to Research into Poverty and Deprivation.
- Bernard Victor Norgan. For charitable services.
- Sister Helen O'Dwyer. For services to Education.
- Patrick Lauri Oakey. For services to Legislation.
- John Oldham, General Medical Practitioner, Glossop. For services to Patient Services.
- Winifred Kit, Mrs. Oliver, D.L., Member, Mole Valley District Council. For services to Business and to the Environment in Surrey.
- Marion, Mrs. Pagani. For services to the Children's Hearing System in Glasgow.
- Sara Lamb, Mrs. Parkin, Director, Forum for the Future. For services to Education and to Sustainable Development.
- Joseph Philip Parkinson, J.P. For services to the administration of Justice and Blind People in Leicestershire.
- Jacky, Mrs. Peacock. For services to the Brent Private Tenants' Rights Group, London.
- Ms Patricia Pearce, lately Director, Careers Service, University of Westminster. For services to Careers Education.
- Robert Pendlebury, Chairman, Northumbria Tourist Board. For services to Tourism.
- Miss Jean Frances Perkins. For services to Netball.
- Michael Charles Petch, Chairman, Advisory Panel on Cardiac Conditions and Driving. For services to Road Safety.
- Christopher Frank Rendall Potter, Headteacher, Old Swinford Hospital School, Stourbridge, West Midlands. For services to Education.
- Miss Anne Margaret Powell. For services to Conservation and to Freshwater Fisheries.
- David Elwyn Powell, lately Grade 7, National Assembly for Wales.
- John Henry Rolland Ramsay. For services to Macmillan Cancer Relief and to the Hospice Movement in North East England.
- Ms Jane Margaret Rapley, Dean, Fashion and Textiles, Central St Martins College of Art and Design, London Institute. For services to Higher Education.
- Michael David Maxwell Rea. For services to Education.
- Miss Dale Reid. For services to Women's Golf.
- Professor John Low Reid. For services to Biomedical Science.
- Kenneth Ernest Reid. For services to Sport.
- William Martin Ritchie. For services to Computer Technology and Business in Scotland.
- Miss Erica Roberts, Director, Millennium Awards. For services to the Millennium Commission.
- Anthony Charles Robinson, Chief Executive, Small Firms Enterprise Development Initiative. For services to Training and to Small Firms.
- Noel Rogers, National Chairman of Fundraising. For services to the Royal British Legion.
- Hilary Rolls, lately B2, Ministry of Defence.
- Miss Patricia Maria Rozario, Singer. For services to Opera.
- Rex Rozario, Founder, Graphic plc. For services to the Electronics Industry.
- Anil Kumar Ruia, Director, Wrengate Ltd. For services to Business in Manchester.
- Donald Rutherford. For services to Rugby Union Football.
- David Joseph Seligman. For services to the community in Cardiff.
- Margaret Olivia, Mrs. Semple. For services to Learning Experience and Arts Education.
- James Reid Sewell, City Archivist, Corporation of London. For services to the City of London and to Municipal Archives.
- Kenneth Everatt Shackleton. For services to the New Deal in Peterborough, Cambridgeshire.
- John David Roger Shore, Deputy Treasury Accountant, H.M. Treasury.
- The Very Reverend John Arthur Simpson, lately Dean of Canterbury. For services to the Church of England.
- Muriel, Mrs. Singleton. For services to Pharmacy Education and Training.
- James Skinner, Chairman, Glasgow Community College Group. For services to Further Education and to the community.
- Professor Francis Jack Smith. For services to Computer Science.
- Gladys Isabella, Mrs. Smyth, T.D. For public service.
- Ian Thomas Snodgrass. For services to Town and Country Planning in Renfrewshire.
- Professor Roy Archibald Joseph Spence, J.P. For services to the Police.
- Miss Eileen Ann Patricia Stewart, Principal Crown Prosecutor, Crown Prosecution Service.
- Hazel, Mrs. Stuteley, Health Visitor, Falmouth, Cornwall. For services to the community.
- Rabbi Nachman Sudak, Principal, Lubavitch Youth Organisation. For services to Young People.
- Brian Ronald Thomas, Senior Group Leader, AWE Aldermaston. For services to the Defence Industry.
- John Hylton Thomas, Headteacher, Wootton Bassett County Secondary School, Wiltshire. For services to Education.
- Miss Beverley Thompson, Director of Race and Criminal Justice, NACRO. For services to Race Equality.
- David James Thompson. For services to Education.
- Sheila, Mrs. Thorpe, Head of Centre, Hillfields Early Excellence Centre, Coventry, West Midlands. For services to Education.
- Miss Mary Geraldine Tigchelaar. For services to Education.
- Christine Elizabeth, Mrs. Tulloch, Assistant Director, HM Board of Inland Revenue.
- Ms Julia Unwin. For services to the Housing Corporation.
- Professor Michael Barham Usher, Chief Scientist, Scottish Natural Heritage. For services to Conservation Science.
- Ramesh Kanji Vala. For services to the Asha Foundation.
- Jane Mylander, Mrs. Wainwright, Director of Information Systems, House of Commons.
- (Hugh) Richard Walduck, J.P., D.L. For services to the community in London and Hertfordshire.
- Mary Marjorie, Mrs. Walker, Member, London Borough of Croydon. For services to the community..
- Miss Anne Frances Wallis, Assistant Director, Rough Sleepers' Unit, Department of the Environment, Transport and the Regions.
- Geoffrey Martin Wanstall, Grade B2, Defence Evaluation and Research Agency, Ministry of Defence.
- Colin Warden, Chief Executive, Castle McLellan Foods Ltd. For services to the Scottish Food Industry.
- Ms Jenifer Warren. For services to the Encouragement of Breast Feeding.
- Gerald Arthur Henry Wells, lately Grade 6, Veterinary Laboratories Agency, Ministry of Agriculture, Fisheries and Food.
- Peter Welsh, Director, UKAEA, Dounreay. For services to the Nuclear Industry.
- Professor David Rex Westbury, Vice Principal, University of Birmingham. For services to Higher Education.
- Audrey, Mrs. Westhead, Headteacher, Chesnut Lodge Special School, Widnes, Cheshire. For services to Children with Special Educational Needs.
- Alan David Wilson, Senior Manager, Anti Smuggling, H.M. Board of Customs and Excise.
- Frederick Thomas Wilson, Q.P.M. For services to the Royal Air Forces Association in North East England.
- Ms Judy Wilson. For services to health care.
- Michael John Wilson, Grade 6, Department for International Development.
- Jeffrey Moss Woolf, Managing Director, MicroMap Ltd. For services to Innovation and Business.
- Andrew Paul Kilding Wright. For services to Architecture and the Built Heritage in Scotland.
- Kenneth Yard, lately Head, Technology Sectors Unit, Department of Trade and Industry.
- Professor Lola Young, Professor, Middlesex University. For services to British Black History.
- Maire, Mrs. Young. For services to Young People.

Diplomatic and Overseas List

- Georgina Teresa, Mrs. Ashworth. For services to international human rights.
- Geoffrey Frederick Bacon. For services to UK-Canadian relations.
- The Right Reverend Kenneth Lawrence Barham. For services to the communities of Central Africa.
- Sonia Wild, Mrs. Bicanic. For services to UK-Croatian cultural relations.
- Allen Christopher Brookes, First Secretary, British High Commission, Canberra.
- Nicholas John Burraston. For services to UK commercial interests in Hungary.
- Dr. Fiona Jean Ward Burslem. For services to health care in Pakistan.
- Christopher Cviic. For services to the promotion of democracy in Central Europe.
- Alan Richard Kirk Dickson. For service to the British community in Argentina.
- Dr. Michael David Downham, M.B.E. For services to the community, Sierra Leone.
- Michael Reginald Frost, lately First Secretary, Lagos.
- Professor Joseph Roger Carby-Hall. For services to UK-Polish relations and international law.
- Professor Anthony David Harries. For services to the study of tuberculosis in Africa.
- Graham Peter Harris, M.B.E., Security Officer, British High Commission, Pretoria.
- Dr. John Hawkins, Acting Head of Finance, British Council Headquarters.
- Dr. Lynne Myfanwy Jones. For services to child psychology and mental health in war-affected areas of Central Europe.
- Ethel, Mrs. De Keyser. For services to human rights.
- Captain Mabry Salisbury Kirkconnell, M.B.E., J.P. For public service, Cayman Islands.
- Irving Yee Yin Koo. For services to British commercial interests, Hong Kong.
- Andrzej Filip Krassowski, lately Assistant Director Development, UN Secretariat.
- Leah Sarah, Mrs. Levin. For services to international human rights.
- George Colin Magnus. For services to Chevening Scholarships in Hong Kong.
- Thomas Gregory Burns Maranon. For services to UK-Spanish cultural relations.
- James Rae McCulloch, H.M. Ambassador, Reykjavik.
- Michael McDowell, Senior Director, Overseas Development Council.
- Kenneth John Millband. For services to the local community in Nepal.
- Valerie Joy, Mrs. Mitchell. For services to The English Speaking Union.
- Dr. Alastair Neil Robertson Niven, Director Literature, British Council Headquarters.
- Miss Charlotte Tessa Rampling. For services to acting and UK-French cultural relations.
- Professor Vera Helen Rees. For services to health care in South Africa.
- Dr. Paul David Sayer. For services to veterinary medicine in Kenya.
- Sister Maria Lia Schwarzmueller. For services to leprosy relief in Tanzania.
- Dominic Kingsley Eason Scott, lately First Secretary (Education Development), British High Commission, New Delhi.
- Michael Roger Pearson Smith. For services to British commercial interests in Argentina.
- Paul Stanislas. For services to British commercial interests in the United States of America.
- Patrick Stewart. For services to acting and the cinema.
- Maureen Patricia, Mrs. Stratford. For services to mentally disabled people in Guangzhou, China.
- Dr. Reginald Brian Stratford. For services to mentally disabled people in Guangzhou, China.
- David Martin Tait. For services to the Promotion of British aviation interests in the United States of America.
- Dr. Robin Erskine Tattersall. For public service, British Virgin Islands.
- Michael Denis Alistair Terry. For services to human rights.
- Richard Paul Raynier Thompson, First Secretary, Foreign and Commonwealth OYce.
- Anthony Trew. For services to British commercial interests and the community, Abu Dhabi.
- John Watson. For services to British commercial interests in the United States of America.
- Alan James White, British Consul (locally engaged), Gothenburg.

==== Members of the Order of the British Empire (MBE) ====
Civil division

- Ronald Norman Ablett. For services to disabled people in Hove, East Sussex.
- John Ackroyd. For services to the community, especially Young People, in West Yorkshire.
- Ms Jo (Alison) Adams, Manager, SheYeld Centre for HIV and Sexual Health. For services to Sexual Health.
- William Arthur James Adams. For services to the Stable Lads' Association and to the Racing Industry.
- Peter Raymond Adcock, Grade C2, Ministry of Defence.
- Kasali Adeniyi Aderogba. For services to Community Relations in Greenwich, London.
- Shamsuddin Ahmed. For services to the Bangladeshi community in North West England.
- Charles Benedict Ainslie. For services to Yachting.
- Mohammad Akhter. For services to the Ethnic Communities in Strathclyde.
- John Currie Allen, Team Leader, Cairngorm Mountain Rescue Team. For services to Mountain Rescue.
- Charles William Alloway, Street Cleaner. For services to the community in Llandaff, Cardiff.
- William Thomas Almond. For services to the National Association of Boys' Clubs/Clubs for Young People.
- Zekia Alsanjak. For services to the Turkish Cypriot community in London.
- Captain Andrew David Alsop. For services to Polar Aviation and to the British Antarctic Survey.
- Elizabeth Anne, Mrs. Amos, Policy Adviser, Council for Excellence in Management and Leadership. For services to Industry.
- Janet Millward, Mrs. Anderson, Principal, Link into Learning, Cornwall. For services to Adult Education. *Annie Nancy, Mrs. Ansaldo. For services to the community in West CardiV.
- Ian James Ansell, Senior Systems Engineer, BAe Systems. For services to the Defence Industry.
- Paul Anthony. For services to the Administration of Justice and to Local Government in Norfolk.
- Arthur Lancelot Appleby. For services to the Cheese Industry in Shropshire.
- Florence Lucy, Mrs. Appleby. For services to the Cheese Industry in Shropshire.
- Jane Grace, Mrs. Arden, Governor, Burlington Danes Church of England School, Hammersmith and Fulham, London. For services to School Governance.
- Iris, Mrs. Arlington. For services to the British Red Cross Society in Ceredigion.
- Louis Mark Attrill. For services to Rowing.
- Patricia Queenie, Mrs. Ayres. For services to the community in Kemble, Gloucestershire.
- Richard Paul Ayres, Head Gardener, National Trust. For services to Horticulture at Anglesey Abbey, Cambridgeshire.
- Gerald Bailey, lately Senior Executive Officer, House of Lords.
- Alexander Alan Bain. For services to the James Hopkins Trust for Disabled Children in Gloucestershire.
- Joan, Mrs. Baird. For public services.
- Jennie, Mrs. Bajic. For services to disabled people in South Wales.
- Kathleen Mary, Mrs. Baker. For services to RELATE in Greater Manchester.
- John Markham Baldock. For services to the Hollycombe Working Steam Collection, Hampshire.
- Frederick John Kirby Barber. For services to the community, especially the Royal British Legion, in Crawley, West Sussex.
- David Edward Barker, Director, Disability North. For services to the Employment of Disabled People. *Winifred, Mrs. Barker. For services to the Chesterfield and North East Derbyshire Pensioners' Action Committee.
- Ronald William Barnes, lately Technical Director, Systems Engineering & Assessment Ltd. For services to the Defence Industry.
- Kathleen, Mrs. Barrett. For services to the Sudbury Neighbourhood Centre, Middlesex.
- The Honourable Fiona Mary Angela, Lady Barttelot. For services to St John Ambulance and to the King Edward VII Hospital, Midhurst, Sussex.
- Edric Thornton Bates. For services to Southampton Football Club.
- John Bates, Caretaker, High Beeches School, Harpenden, Hertfordshire. For services to Education.
- Brendon Batson, Deputy Chief Executive, Professional Footballers' Association. For services to Association Football.
- John William Bayley, Grade C1, Ministry of Defence.
- George James Beacom. For services to the community.
- Jeremy James Anthony Gibson Beadle. For charitable services, especially to the Foundation for Children with Leukaemia.
- The Reverend Canon Owen John Beament. For services to the community in Deptford and New Cross, London.
- Sheila Margaret Begbie. For services to Women's Association Football.
- Norma, Mrs. Bennie, Vice Chairman, Mental Welfare Commission for Scotland. For services to people with mental illness.
- James Bentley. For services to Road Safety.
- Miss Grietje Van Den Berg. For services to the community in London.
- The Reverend Alan Oliver Berry. For services to the Bethany Christian Trust and to Homeless People in Edinburgh.
- John Edward Bethell, Chairman, Erin Arts Centre. For services to Music on the Isle of Man.
- David Charles Biles. For services to the community, especially Agriculture, on the Isle of Wight.
- Acker Bernard Stanley Bilk, Jazz clarinettist. For services to Music.
- Kenneth Binney, Shop Floor Operative, Remploy Ltd, Sheffield. For services to the Employment of Disabled People.
- Roland Biosah, Higher Executive OYcer, Benefits Agency, Department of Social Security.
- Clive Francis William Birch. For services to the Buckingham Heritage Trust.
- Kenneth Errol Bird. For services to the Fire Service.
- Elizabeth Toye, Mrs. Black. For services to Vocational Education and to the community.
- John Stanley Blanchard. For services to the Parish Council and to the community in Donhead St Mary, Wiltshire.
- Miss Elsie Mary Bliss, Chairman, Diocesan Advisory Committee. For services to Church Heritage in Gloucestershire.
- Vera, Mrs. Bolter, J.P. For services to the community, especially Health Education, in Newcastle upon Tyne, Tyne and Wear.
- Miss Gladys Elizabeth Bond. For services to the Police.
- Joan Irene, Mrs. Bond, Registry Administrator, University of Wolverhampton. For services to Higher Education.
- Ronald Boobier. For services to the community in Tiverton, Devon.
- Miss Mary Lilian Bovey. For services to the community in Edinburgh.
- Colin Bowd. For services to Young People.
- Colonel Roger George Bowden, T.D. For services to the community, especially the New Green Community Centre, in Thurston, Suffolk.
- Carole, Mrs. Bowles. For services to Animal Welfare in Plymouth, Devon.
- Julie, Mrs. Bowman. For services to Patients of the Carlisle Hospitals NHS Trust, Cumbria.
- Nellie Elizabeth Emily, Mrs. Bowser. For services to the community, especially the Tindale Crescent Hospital, in Bishop Auckland, County Durham.
- Beryl Georgina, Mrs. Boyd. For services to the community in Wokingham, Berkshire.
- Miss Elizabeth Macpherson Boyd. For services to the Fire Services National Benevolent Fund.
- Anthony Bernard Braddock, Higher Executive Officer, Benefits Agency, Department of Social Security.
- Miss Avtar Brah, Reader in Sociology, Birkbeck College, University of London. For services to Race, Gender and Ethnic Identity Issues.
- Phelim Edward Breen. For services to Juvenile Justice.
- Miss Susan Jessie Breslin, Head of Midwifery, Royal Shrewsbury Hospital, Shropshire. For services to Nursing and to Midwifery.
- Judith Anne, Mrs. Brinkley, lately Personal Assistant to the Chief Executive, London Transport. For services to Public Transport.
- George William Britten. For charitable services to the community in Hilton, Cambridgeshire.
- Vicky Broadribb. For services to Disabled Sports.
- Betty, Mrs. Brown. For services to the community and Guiding in the Parish of West Grinstead, West Sussex.
- Donald Graham Brown, Lay Member, H.M. Inspectorate of Schools. For services to Education in the North of Scotland.
- Hamish Macmillan Brown. For services to Encouraging an Appreciation of the Outdoors by Young People.
- Hugh Oakes Brown, Project Manager, Tayside Primary Care NHS Trust. For services to the NHS and to the community.
- Ms Yasmin Alibhai-Brown. For services to Journalism.
- Laraine, Mrs. Bruce. For services to People with Learning Disabilities in Wales.
- John Michael Bullock, Administrative Officer, School Development Team, Cheshire Local Education Authority. For services to School Buildings Development.
- Graham Bunn, Manager. For services to the Environment and to Farming in Norfolk.
- Patrick Joseph Burke, Field Support Manager, Employment Service, Department for Education and Employment.
- Paul Burns, lately Organisation Development Manager, BT. For services to Community/Business Links.
- Paul Burrows. For services to Education.
- John Butler, Tower Captain, St Andrew's Parish Church. For services to Bellringing in Bradfield, Berkshire.
- Peter James Butt, lately Registration Officer (Births, Deaths and Marriages), Office for National Statistics.
- Joseph Byrne, Car Park Attendant, Employment Service, Department for Education and Employment.
- Kenneth Cairns. For services to Disabled Sports.
- William Alexander Sinclair Caldow. For services to Disabled Ex-Service Personnel.
- Miss Edna Patricia Caldwell. For public service.
- Moira, Mrs. Callow. For services to Fostering on the Isle of Man.
- Miss Morva Elizabeth Calvert. For services to Education.
- Norma Mary, Mrs. Campbell. For services to the community on Orkney.
- Susan, Mrs. Cantillon, Senior Executive Officer, Highways Agency, Department of the Environment, Transport and the Regions.
- Marjorie Grace, Mrs. Carey. For services to the WRVS and to the community in Tunbridge Wells, Kent.
- Glenys, Mrs. Carter, Director, National Association of Toy and Leisure Libraries. For services to Early Years Education.
- Madeleine, Mrs. Carter, Childminder, Haringey, London. For services to Early Years Education.
- Marie Louise, Mrs. Carter. For services to the Harold Wood League of Friends, Hornchurch, Essex.
- Caroline Mary, Mrs. Caunter. For services to Age Concern in Salisbury, Wiltshire.
- Sarah Anne, Mrs. Cavender. For charitable services to the Leukaemia Research Fund and to the Royal Manchester Children's Hospital.
- Peter George Chamberlain, lately Governor, Goldington Green Lower School, Bedfordshire. For services to Education.
- Jean Marguerite, Mrs. Chance. For services to the community, especially the Crowthorne Old Age to Teens Society, in Berkshire.
- Colin Chandler, General Manager, Ship Safe Training Group Ltd. For services to Training in the Shipping Industry.
- Abu Taher Mohammed Mohiuddin Chowdhury, J.P., Executive OYcer, Benefits Agency, Department of Social Security.
- Peter Chee Keung Chui. For services to the Chinese community in Manchester.
- Anthony John Clark, Member, Kirkbymoorside Town Council, York. For services to the community.
- Harry Clark, Chairman, Seaham Environmental Association. For services to the community in County Durham.
- Mary Gwendolen, Mrs. Clark. For services to the Crewkerne Museum and Heritage Centre, Somerset.
- Miss Olive Lucy Clark. For services to War Pensioners in Reading, Berkshire.
- Ms Elspeth Vaughan Clarke, Personal Assistant to the Chief Executive, Channel 5. For services to Broadcasting.
- June, Mrs. Clarke, J.P., Recovery Manager, H.M. Board of Inland Revenue.
- Peter Alan Clarke, Sub Officer, StaVordshire Fire and Rescue Service. For services to the Fire Service.
- Miss Dorothy Mary Clevitt. For services to the community in Littlehampton, West Sussex.
- Bernard John Cobley. For services to the community in St Paul's Cray and Orpington, Kent.
- Professor Jennifer Susan Colbourne, Public Health Research Manager, Thames Water. For services to the Water Industry and to Public Health.
- Stella Mabel, Mrs. Ross-Collins. For charitable services to the NSPCC in Hertfordshire.
- John Irvine Monteit Conely. Head, District Medical Equipment Engineering Department, Oxford Radcliffe Hospital NHS Trust. For services to the NHS.
- Stephanie Cook. For services to Modern Pentathlon.
- Betty Hayden, Mrs. Cooper. For services to the Friends of Guy's Flower Shop and to the St Thomas' Hospital Trust, London.
- Kenneth George Cooper, T.D. For services to the Sussex Association of Boys' Clubs.
- Major Gordon James Corbett, J.P. For services to the Army Cadet Force on Merseyside.
- Keith Frederick Corbett. For services to the Conservation of Amphibians and Reptiles.
- Peter Donald Cowmeadow, Principal Fire Control OYcer, Hampshire Fire and Rescue Service. For services to Fire Safety.
- James Cracknell. For services to Rowing.
- Robin Leslie Cree. For public services.
- Michael Thomas Creek. For services to the community in Ilfracombe, Devon.
- Ruth, Mrs. Crossman. For services to the War Widows' Association.
- Dora Ryan, Mrs. Crudge. For services to Bowls for Visually Impaired People in Stirlingshire.
- Helen, Mrs. Culling, Diary Secretary to the Chief Executive, Teacher Training Agency, Department for Education and Employment.
- Miss Anne Marie Cunningham. For services to the Fishing Industry.
- Sheila Priscilla Isabel Churchill, Mrs. Curran. For services to Epilepsy SuVerers and Carers.
- Daniel Daley. For services to the Monserratian community.
- Miss Eleanor Dalgetty, Business Support Manager, Scottish Executive.
- Glyn Dalton. For services to the Accident and Emergency Department of King's College Hospital and to the community in London.
- Martin Henry Damerell, lately, First Line Manager, Devonport Management Ltd. For services to the Defence Industry.
- Andrew William Davidson, Lecturer, Barony College, Dumfries. For services to Further Education.
- David Mansel Kaye Davies, Owner, Mansel Davies and Son. For services to Business and to the community in West Wales.
- Peter John Davies. For services to the Honorary Police on Jersey.
- Robert Llewellyn Davies, Head of Health, Safety and Environment, University of Wales College of Medicine. For services to Health and Safety.
- Ronald Davies. For charitable services, through Jailbreak, in Herefordshire.
- Miss Doreen Davis. For services to the Ethnic Communities in London.
- Francis Benedict Hunt-Davis. For services to Rowing.
- Peter Stephen Davis, Research Nurse, Queen's Medical Centre, Nottingham. For services to Orthopaedic Nursing.
- Derek Bainforde Dawson. For services to the British Limbless Ex-Service Men's Association.
- Olwyn, Mrs. Dawson. For services to the community, especially the Citizens Advice Bureau and Cruse Bereavement Care, in Surrey.
- Colin Dean. For services to Road Safety.
- Gilroy Delves, Chairman, Harry Tuffin Supermarkets Ltd. For services to the community in Church Stoke, Powys.
- Colin Dempster. For services to Young People.
- Simon Dennis. For services to Rowing.
- Major John Harold Desmond, Army Careers Officer, Ministry of Defence.
- Alan Garden Diack. For services to the Restoration of the Organ, Glasgow Cathedral.
- Henrietta Margaret, Mrs. Diack. For services to the Restoration of the Organ, Glasgow Cathedral.
- Malcolm McDonald Diamond, Managing Director, Trifast. For services to Entrepreneurship.
- Phyllis, Mrs. Dryhurst-Dodd. For services to the community in Denbighshire.
- Richard John Dommett, Waterways Manager, South Wales and Somerset Canals, British Waterways. For services to Inland Waterways.
- David Thomas Joseph Doughan. For services to Women's Studies.
- Rowley Douglas. For services to Rowing.
- Geoffrey Lionel Dove. For services to Small Businesses in Croydon, Surrey.
- Mary, Mrs. Dove. For services to the Railway Industry at Marlow Station, Buckinghamshire.
- Elizabeth Johnston, Mrs. Drabble. For services to Crime Prevention in North Yorkshire.
- David Driver. For services to Material Science, Engineering and Technology Transfer.
- Joan Mary Isobel, Mrs. Drummond. For services to Local Government.
- Julia, Mrs. Duffield, Farmer. For services to Agriculture in Norfolk.
- Stanley George Durn, lately Sub Officer (Retained), Gloucestershire. For services to the Fire Service.
- Hans Eric Eilenberg. For services to the Ex-Service community.
- Frederick William Elder, lately Security Manager, 10 Downing Street.
- Dafydd Ellis, Senior Probation Officer, North Wales Probation Service. For services to the community in Gwynedd.
- Jane, Mrs. Ellis, Senior Communications Manager, Department of Health.
- Aubrey Roland Elphick. For services to the community in Herstmonceaux, East Sussex.
- Ann, Mrs. Espin. For services to Fostering in Lincolnshire.
- James Ashworth Owen Evans. For services to the community in Guilsfield, Powys.
- Martin John Crossley Evans, J.P., Warden, Manor Hall, University of Bristol. For services to Higher Education.
- Michael Frank Evans, Station OYcer, Buckinghamshire Fire and Rescue Service. For services to the Fire Service.
- Rosina Lavaine, Mrs. Evans. For services to the community in Lampeter, West Wales.
- Sheila Lily, Mrs. Evans, Nurse. For services to Renal Patient Care at Leicester General Hospital.
- Vivian Dexter Evans. For services to the community in Swansea, South Wales.
- Jacqueline Lesley, Mrs. Everson, Grade E1, Ministry of Defence.
- Jean Ann, Mrs. Fane, lately Senior Personal Secretary to the Chief Economic Adviser, H.M. Treasury.
- Leonard Edward Faram, Director, Transport on Water. For services to the River Thames.
- Eileen Florence, Mrs. Farrar, Manager, Threshers Day Nursery, St Mary Cray, Orpington, Kent. For services to Education.
- Richard Faulds. For services to Competitive Shooting.
- Pamela Frances, Mrs. Feast, County Award Officer, Duke of Edinburgh's Award, Oxfordshire. For services to Young People.
- Pamela Mary, Mrs. Ferguson. For charitable services to the community in Bishop Auckland, County Durham.
- Joy Chana, Mrs. Fifer, Chairperson, Moseley Bog Management Committee. For services to Wildlife Conservation in Birmingham.
- Peter Finlay, Sub-Postmaster, Menston, Yorkshire. For services to the National Federation of Sub-Postmasters and to the community.
- Graham Fisher. For services to the Lapal Canal Trust in the West Midlands.
- James McIntosh Fisher. For services to the Conservation of Scotland's Wildlife.
- Gillian, Mrs. Fitzhugh. For services to the community, especially Young People, in North Kensington, London.
- Malcolm Flavell, Divisional Officer, Metropolitan Special Constabulary. For services to the Police.
- Miss Donna Lilian Florey, Local Officer 2, Benefits Agency, Department of Social Security.
- Martha, Mrs. Flower. For services to the Peggy Dodd Centre in Bath.
- Margaret Christine, Mrs. Flynn, lately Business Manager, H.M. Board of Customs and Excise.
- Andrew Frank James Fogden, Section Officer, Gloucestershire Special Constabulary. For services to the Police.
- David Foster, Grade C1, Ministry of Defence.
- Miss Margaret Gwendoline Eunice Foster. For services to Midwifery.
- Terence Michael Foster, Associate Regional Secretary, UNISON. For services to the Trade Union Movement.
- Timothy Foster. For services to Rowing.
- Trevor John French Foster. For services to the community in Bradford, West Yorkshire.
- Molly Eileen, Mrs. Fowler. For services to the community, especially Scouting in High Wycombe, Buckinghamshire.
- Jeanette, Mrs. Franklin. For services to the Nuffield Orthopaedic Centre Appeal.
- Reginald Charles French, Chair, Herefordshire Group Training Association. For services to Training.
- Ronald William Froud, Manager, Parks and Gardens Department, Corporation of London. For services to the City of London and to Horticulture.
- Walter Gerald Fryer. For services to the Derbyshire Carers' Association.
- Marjorie, Mrs. Gallimore, Member, Liverpool Housing Action Trust. For services to the community.
- Peter Alan Gammon. For services to the Police Superintendents' Association.
- Wendy, Mrs. Gane. For services to the British Diabetic Association in South Wales.
- Michael David Gardiner. For services to the Professional Engineering Institutions in North East England.
- John Gardner, Senior Project Design Engineer, AWE Aldermaston. For services to the Defence Industry.
- Margaret Mary, Mrs. Gardner, Administrative Assistant, University of Lancaster. For services to Higher Education.
- Patricia, Mrs. Garner. For services to Elderly People in Burnham, Buckinghamshire.
- Michael Garrett, Director of Innovation, BOC Gases (Europe). For services to Innovation.
- Derek Garrity. For services to the Aylesham and District Community Workshop in Kent.
- Derek Gaskell. For services to the Brain and Spinal Injury Charity.
- Andrew William Gazard. For services to the community, especially Young People, in Oldbury-on- Severn, Bristol.
- Frederick Gilbert, General Service Team Leader, London School of Economics. For services to Higher Education.
- Richard Gill, T.D., J.P., D.L. For services to the Victim Support Scheme in Northamptonshire.
- Hayden Ginns, project Development Manager, Portsmouth Local Education Authority. For services to DisaVected Young People.
- Jean Mary, Mrs. Glynn. For services to the Parish Council and to the community in East Grinstead, West Sussex.
- Miss Bernadette Ann Goff, Secretary, Remploy Ltd. For services to the Employment of Disabled People.
- Mary, Mrs. Goronwy. For services to the community in Bristol.
- Alan Joseph Graham, Consultant Marine Surveyor. For services to Ship Safety.
- Margaret Rachel, Mrs. Graham. For charitable services.
- Jean Agnes, Mrs. Graves. For services to Ballroom and Latin American Dancing.
- Donald Green. For services to Hand Cutting Slates.
- Elizabeth Ann, Mrs. Green. For services to the Adelphi Ragged School and Lads' Club, Salford, Manchester.
- George Henry Green. For services to the Worcestershire Wildlife Trust.
- Josephine, Mrs. Greenaway, Organist. For services to St Breward Parish Church, Bodmin, Cornwall.
- Hannah Philomena, Mrs. Greene, ChauVeur to the Lord Mayor of Westminster. For services to Local Government.
- Miss Penny (Jillian Penelope Raine) Greenland, Founder Director, Jabadoa Centre for Movement Studies. For services to Dance.
- Russell John William Greenstock. For services to disabled people, especially through the Jubilee Sailing Trust, on Alderney.
- Brian Griffiths, Prison Officer, H.M. Prison Swansea.
- Diana Brenton, Mrs. Griffiths. For services to the WRVS in Charlbury, Oxfordshire.
- Trevor Arthur Grosvenor. For services to the community in Stourbridge, West Midlands.
- Luka Grubor. For services to Rowing.
- The Reverend Kenneth Willoughby Habershon. For services to the Limpsfield Trust for Young People, in West Sussex.
- Margaret Ann, Mrs. Haldane, Personal Executive Secretary, Department of Social Security.
- Douglas Kingsford-Hale, Chairman, Cornwall Aircraft (Helston) Ltd. For services to Tourism.
- Molly Evelyn, Mrs. Hall. For services to the Uxbridge Victim Support Scheme.
- Norman Charles Hamblyn, General Medical Practitioner, Bromley, Kent. For services to Health Care.
- Denis James Hamer. For services to the community in Halliwell, Lancashire.
- John Harris Hammond, Founder, Border Fine Arts. For services to Business and to the community in Dumfries and Galloway.
- Robert John Hampson, Pay Span 6, Court Service Agency, Lord Chancellor's Department.
- Raymond John Hancock. For services to the community, especially Kilve Court Residential and Outdoor Education Centre, in Somerset.
- Kenneth Cecil Handley, Vice-Chair, Bishop Auckland College Corporation, County Durham. For services to Further Education.
- William Percival James Hardiman. For services to Sports Ground Management in Wales.
- Tessa, Mrs. Hardy. For services to Riding for the Disabled in Lowestoft, SuVolk.
- Jeffrey Richard Harmer, J.P., lately Senior Executive Officer, Home OYce.
- Audley Harrison. For services to Boxing.
- Trevor Harrison (Trevor Wooldridge), Actor. For services to Radio Drama, particularly The Archers.
- John Milne Harrop. For services to the RNLI in Ruthin, Denbighshire.
- Michael Harvey, Letter Carver. For services to Art.
- William Harvey. For services to the Holy Trinity Church in Edingale, Staffordshire.
- Raymond Frederick Hatchard, Chief Building Surveyor, Corporation of London. For services to Local Government.
- Audrey Alison, Mrs. Hawkins, Principal, Alison School of Dance. For services to the community in Solihull, West Midlands.
- Hazel, Mrs. Hawkridge. For services to the community, especially the Coverdale Housing Trust and the Citizens Advice Bureau, in Torbay, Devon.
- Kenneth Thomas Hay, J.P. For services to the community in Upminster, Essex.
- Victor Alexander Haydon. For services to the Association of Professional Toastmasters.
- Joyce, Mrs. Hayward. For services to the community on the Prenton Dell Estate, Birkenhead, Merseyside.
- Sandra, Mrs. Helliwell. For services to the WRVS and to the community in Otley, West Yorkshire.
- Edward Walter Henbery. For services to the Ilfield Watermill in Crawley, West Sussex.
- David Arfon Henderson. For services to the community, especially Young People, in Rhondda, South Wales.
- Margaret, Mrs. Herd, Administrative Assistant, Department of Social Security.
- William Bryan Hewertson. For services to the community in Kendal, Cumbria.
- Miss Margaret Carruthers Hewitt. For services to the World Organisation for Early Childhood Education (O.M.E.P.).
- Rowena Morley, Mrs. Hibbin. For services to the community in Denbighshire.
- Michael Hill, lately Retained Sub Officer, Warwickshire Fire Brigade. For services to the Fire Service.
- Brian Hillier, lately Manager, Assessment Network. For services to Investors in People.
- Linda Louise, Mrs. Hingley, Trawler Owner. For services to Marine Conservation.
- Caroline Ann, Mrs. Hippisley. For services to Save the Children in Scotland.
- Marina, Mrs. Hobson, J.P. For services to the community, especially the John Grooms Association for Disabled People, in London.
- Ethel, Mrs. Hodson. For services to the WRVS in Rotherham, South Yorkshire.
- Sheila, Mrs. Hoile, Development Director, Training Organisation for Professionals in Construction. For services to Training in the Construction Industry.
- Robert Wynnfield Hooke. For services to the Police. Kathleen, Mrs. Hornett, Field OYce Administrator, Ordnance Survey, Department of the Environment, Transport and the Regions.
- Eleri, Mrs. Hourahane, Headteacher, Ysgol Sant Curig. For services to Welsh Medium Education.
- Arthur Howarth. For services to the community in Withington, Manchester.
- Ms Hilary Jane Howatt, Member, National Transport Forum for Scotland. For services to Accessible Transport.
- Miss Mary Swan Howie, Farmer. For services to Agriculture and to Agricultural Research.
- Kenneth Frederick Howse. For services to the British Theatre for disabled people.
- Evan Millward Hughes, Chair of Governors, Brynhafren County Primary School. For services to Education.
- Alwyn Humphreys, Musical Director, Morriston Orpheus Choir. For services to Music in Wales.
- Olive, Mrs. Hunt. For charitable services to the community in Goole, East Yorkshire.
- Geoffrey Hunter, Postman. For services to the Post Office and to charity in Stockport, Lancashire.
- William McNeil Hunter, lately Grade A3, Scottish Executive.
- Anne, Mrs. Hutchinson, J.P. For services to the community, especially Disabled People, in Tyne and Wear.
- Basil Hutton. For services to Education.
- Peter Ridley Hutton, Divisional Officer, Lancashire Special Constabulary. For services to the Police.
- Chelvadurai Pulenthira Ilamurugan. Large Trader Assurance Officer, H.M. Board of Customs and Excise.
- Caroline Innes. For services to Disabled Sports.
- John Anthony Ireland, Foundation Governor, St. Andrew the Apostle Catholic Primary School and All Saints Catholic High School, Knowsley, Merseyside. For services to Education.
- Paul Edward Jagger. For services to the Trade Union Movement in Yorkshire and Humberside.
- Isabella, Mrs. Jarvie. For services to Strathcarron Hospice, Denny, Stirlingshire.
- Ann Ellis, Mrs. Jee. For services to Squash.
- William Harris Jenkins. For services to the Chartered Surveyors Benevolent Fund.
- Allan Jepson. For charitable services to the Leukaemia Research Fund in Cheshire.
- Ann Shirley, Mrs. Jones. For services to the Royal Hospital Chelsea.
- Nina, Mrs. Jones. For services to the community in Bridgend, South Wales.
- Ronald Jones. For services to Sport.
- William Thomas Jones, Roads Foreman, Forestry Commission.
- Jamie, Mrs. Lee-Judson. For services to the Labrador Rescue Society.
- Andrew John Kavanagh, lately Senior Officer, H.M.Prison The Mount.
- Ernest Kay, For services to the Development of Offa's Dyke and to the community in Powys.
- Charles John Keeble, For services to the Pest Control Industry.
- Anne, Mrs. Kenrick. For services to Castle Bromwich Hall Gardens Trust, West Midlands.
- Miss Judith Anne Caroline Kent, Teacher, Abbey Junior School, Darlington, County Durham. For services to Education.
- Eston Andrew Kilgour, District Registrar, Kirkcaldy, Fife. For services to the Registration Service.
- Teresa Mary, Mrs. Killeen, Higher Executive Officer, Department of Social Security.
- Harry King, General Manager, Communications Systems, Transport for London. For services to Public Transport.
- Major Reginald Stanley King. For services to the Soldiers', Sailors' and Airmen's Families Association in Lincolnshire.
- Helen Paton Smith, Mrs. Kininmonth, Placement Officer, University of Paisley. For services to Higher Education.
- Melvyn William Kinsey, Leading Firefighter, West Midlands Fire Service. For services to the Fire Service and to the community.
- Edward Alfred Kirtland. For services to People with Learning Disabilities in Tower Hamlets, London.
- Alan Knight. For services to Association Football.
- Veronica, Mrs. Laird, Director, St Helen's Chamber of Commerce Training and Enterprise. For services to Education, Training and Business Development.
- Dolatkhanu, Mrs. Lakhani, Administrative OYcer, Department for Education and Employment.
- Margaret Christine, Mrs. Laviers. For services to the Northgate and Prudhoe NHS Trust and to the community in Northumberland.
- Sybil, Mrs. Law. For services to the Plain English Campaign.
- Margaret Ann, Mrs. Lawrence, Pay Span 2, Court Service Agency, Lord Chancellor's Department.
- Kathleen Monica, Mrs. Lawson. For services to the Parish Council and to the community in East Hagbourne, Oxfordshire.
- Richard Christopher Fraser Leach. For services to the Corporation of the Sons of the Clergy in Westminster, London.
- Walter John Leach. For services to the British Leprosy Association.
- Patricia, Mrs. Leiper, School Administrator, St. Modan's High School, Alva. For services to Education.
- Miss Sylvia Lillian Lemon, Personal Secretary, Health and Safety Executive, Department of the Environment, Transport and the Regions.
- Jean, Mrs. Lenoir. For services to the Soldiers', Sailors' and Airmen's Association in Wolverhampton.
- Pauline, Mrs. Leppingwell, Site Services Administrator, Bradford Royal Infirmary. For services to the NHS.
- David John Lester. For services to the St. Peter's Church Boys' Club, Norton, North Yorkshire.
- Dianne, Mrs. Lewis, Nurse, Huddersfield. For services to Nursing.
- Thomas Samuel Lewis. For services to the Ty Bryngwyn Hospice, Llanelli, South Wales.
- David Lightfoot, Factory Manager, Remploy Library Services, Halifax. For services to the employment of disabled people.
- Andrew Lindsay. For services to Rowing.
- Dayantha Porambe Liyanage, lately Member, Medway Unitary Authority. For services to the community in Kent.
- Stephen James Lloyd. For services to the British Red Cross Society.
- Captain Kenneth Lockwood, T.D. For services to the Colditz Association.
- Nicholas John Long. For services to the community and to the Police in Lambeth, London.
- Miss Janet Patricia Lord. For services to EMI.
- John Loudoun. For services to the community in Evesham, Worcestershire.
- William Allen Loughlin. For services to the community.
- Manikam Susheela, Mrs. Lourie. For services to Race Equality in North Wales.
- Judith, Mrs. Lund. For services to Rural Issues in County Durham.
- Edmund Grant Luscombe, Chief Executive, Landlife. For services to the National Wildflower Centre, Merseyside.
- Daniel Lyons. For services to the Vidra Orphanage in Romania and Crisis at Christmas in London.
- Michael Macgregor. For services to Wildlife Education and Photography.
- Joan Lillian, Mrs. Machin, Health Visitor, Scarborough, Yorkshire. For services to Women and Young People.
- Donald Michael MacLean. For services to Inter Faith Relations.
- Iseabail MacLeod. For services to the Scottish National Dictionary.
- Ms Angela Lynne Main. For services to the community in Wester Hailes, Edinburgh.
- Gerrard Martin Mallon, Chief Nurse, Bradford Community Health NHS Trust. For services to Nursing.
- Eileen Winifred Ruth, Mrs. Mander, Head of Physical Education, Sidmouth Community College, Devon. For services to Physical Education.
- Joe Mann. For services to the National League of the Blind and Disabled.
- Captain Cameron John March, Retired Officer 2, Ministry of Defence.
- Christabel, Mrs. Marchant, J.P., lately Deputy Head, Freight Grants Unit, Department of the Environment, Transport and the Regions.
- Constance Winifred, Mrs. Goodridge-Mark, B.E.M. For services to the community in London.
- Linda, Mrs. Martin, Grade E1, Ministry of Defence.
- Dorothy Ormerod, Mrs. Maskell, Team Manager, CareerLink, Lancashire. For services to the Careers Service.
- Anthony Graham Mason, Consultant, Metropolitan Police Service. For services to the Police.
- Shirley Ann, Mrs. Mason. For services to Disability Action in Sutton, Surrey.
- Earl James Matthew. For services to the Boys' Brigade in Angus.
- The Reverend Rodney Stuart Matthews. For services to Ecumenism and to Pilgrims Crossing Scotland 2000.
- Keith Maybury, Chair, Ashby Woulds Forum, Leicestershire. For services to Regeneration.
- Ian McAllister. For services to the community in Dumfries and Galloway.
- Nancy Ann, Mrs. McBride. For services to Student Health Care.
- Miss Mary Elizabeth McClymont, Visiting Lecturer, University of Hertfordshire. For services to Care for Older People.
- Elizabeth Pamela, Mrs. McComiskey, School Crossing Patrol OYcer, Romiley Primary School. For services to the community in Stockport, Greater Manchester.
- Howard John McConnell. For services to the Ambulance Service.
- Samuel McCrea. For services to Small Business.
- Grace Frances, Mrs. McCullough. For public service.
- Alex McGowan, Health and Safety Manager, Kvaerner Oil and Gas Ltd. For services to Health and Safety.
- James McIver, Chaplain, Scottish Prison Service. For services to Prisoners' Welfare.
- Miss Joanne McKenna. For services to Victim Support in Northern Ireland.
- Patricia, Mrs. Meldrum, Customer Manager. For services to the Gas Industry.
- Christine, Mrs. Meleady. For services to the Sheffield Children's Centre, South Yorkshire.
- Brian Mellor, Crime and Fire Prevention Co-ordinator, Kirklees Metropolitan Council. For services to Fire Safety.
- David Baxter Mercer, Chief Operations Officer, ScaPA Technologies Ltd. For services to Computer Software Technology.
- Peter Midgley, Area Manager, Environment Agency. For services to Environmental Protection.
- Isobel Mary Gertrude, Mrs. Millar. For public service.
- Colin William Mills, Level 7 (B2), Defence Evaluation and Research Agency, Ministry of Defence.
- Joanna Margaret, Mrs. Milne. For services to St Margaret's Chapel Guild, Edinburgh Castle.
- Indiraben, Mrs. Mistry, Personal Secretary, H.M. Board of Inland Revenue.
- John William Mitchell, Sound Mixer and Recordist. For services to the Film Industry.
- Terence Reginald Mitchell, Submarine Project Manager, Devonport Management Ltd. For services to the Defence Industry.
- Professor Tariq Modood. For services to Social Science and Ethnic Relations.
- Peter Leigh Moffat, lately General Medical Practitioner and Prison Medical Officer, Wigtownshire. For services to Health Care.
- Miss Janet Deborah Mooney, Departmental Disaster Recovery Manager, Department of Trade and Industry.
- Anthony Francis Moore, lately Deputy Head, Bryncelynnog, Beddau. For services to Education and to Music in Wales.
- Jean Shirley, Mrs. Moore. For services to the NSPCC and to the community in Hawarden, North Wales.
- Catherine Lorna, Mrs. Moran, Chief Executive, Northern Recruitment Group. For services to Employment Creation.
- Francis Joseph Moran, Manager, Central London Street Outreach Team, Bondway Housing Association. For services to Homeless People.
- Paul Faulconer Morgan. For services to the community in Macclesfield, Cheshire.
- Philip John Morley, Higher Executive Officer, Ministry of Agriculture, Fisheries and Food.
- Miss Agnes Morrison, Forester, Glendye Estate, Kincardineshire. For services to Forestry and to the community.
- Frank Arnold Moyes, Trident Navigation Team Leader, BAe Systems. For services to the Defence Industry.
- Ann, Mrs. Mulvey. For services to the RAF Association in Lancashire.
- Brigadier Michael Noel Nagle (Retd). For services to Sports Aid.
- Mary Eveline, Mrs. Naylor. For services to the Leeds Society for Deaf and Blind People.
- Isabel Conway, Mrs. Newstead. For services to Disabled Sports.
- Susan Diana, Mrs. Newton. For services to the National Association of Adult Placement Services.
- Thomas Newton. For services to the community in Greater Manchester.
- Mary, Mrs. Nicholl. For services to the community.
- Henry Nicol, Store Assistant 1, Ministry of Defence.
- Ms Anne Nightingale. For services to Radio Broadcasting.
- Janet, Mrs. Nisbet, Church Officer, Stair Parish Church. For services to the community.
- Pauline, Mrs. Noble, Youth Club Leader, Aylesbury, Buckinghamshire. For services to Young People.
- Jane Elizabeth, Mrs. Nolan. For services to the Shark Group Ltd and to Export.
- Jon Thomas Norman, Postman. For services to the Post Office and to the Romanian Aid Foundation.
- David Linklater Norquay, Retained Station Officer. For services to the Highlands and Islands Fire Brigade.
- Stephen John Norrish. For services to the community, especially Young People, in Milton Keynes, Buckinghamshire.
- Michael Ernest Gazeley Northen, President, Association of Lighting Designers. For services to the Theatre.
- Cecilia, Mrs. Nutting. For charitable services to Macmillan Cancer Relief in London.
- George Maxwell O'Brien. For services to Trade Unionism.
- William Edward O'Flaherty. For services to the Police.
- John Denis O'Hagan. For services to Drug and Alcohol Misusers.
- Charles Paul O'Kane. For services to the Fire Service and to the community.
- Frances O'Kane. For services to the community.
- Barbara Elizabeth, Mrs. O'Rourke, Headteacher, Monnow Infants School, Newport, Monmouthshire. For services to Education.
- Elizabeth, Mrs. Oliver, Grade E1, Ministry of Defence.
- Colin Osborne, J.P. For services to the community in Sandy, Bedfordshire.
- Patricia, Mrs. Pagan, Nurse, York District Hospital. For services to Nursing.
- James Cornish Page. For services to the Local and National Voluntary Arts Organisations.
- Jeanette Margaret, Mrs. Page, Typist, Employment Tribunals Service, Department of Trade and Industry.
- Angela Jayne, Mrs. Parry, Executive Officer, National Assembly for Wales.
- Ivor Malcolm Parry, Tower Captain, St. Mary's Church. For services to Bellringing in Rye, East Sussex.
- Rajesh Patel. For services to the Black Training Enterprise Group.
- Prem Lata, Mrs. Pathak, General Medical Practitioner, Cheshire. For services to Health Care.
- Max Whitfield Payne. For services to Fundraising for Local Charities.
- Kenneth Peach. For services to disabled people in Cheshire.
- Anne Millar, Mrs. Pearson, Headteacher, Park Primary School, Alloa. For services to Education in Clackmannanshire.
- David Lee Pearson. For services to Disabled Sports.
- Anthony Lawrence Geoffrey Peel. For charitable services to the community in North Teesside.
- Miss Josephine Mary Anne Peel. For services to the 52nd (Lowland) Divisional Reconnaissance Regiment, Old Comrades Association.
- James Henry Pennington. For services to the community in Cheltenham, Gloucestershire.
- Elizabeth MacKenzie Fane, Mrs. Pentland. For services to the World Wide Fund for Nature in Scotland.
- Iain Percy. For services to Yachting.
- Mary Kathleen, Mrs. Perkins. For services to the Natural Environment Research Council.
- Joyce Mary, Mrs. Perry. For services to the community, especially the Petersfield Voluntary Centre, in Hampshire.
- Edith Ann, Mrs. Peters. For services to the community in Tyne and Wear.
- Joan Thyrza Gwenllian, Mrs. Peters. For services to the community in Swansea, South Wales.
- Miss Eleanor Ann Phillips, lately Senior Law Clerk, Serious Fraud Office.
- Frederick Lawrence Samuel Phillips. For services to the community in Kedington, Suffolk.
- Alan Charles John Pigott. For services to the community in Bakewell, Derbyshire.
- Peter Pillay, Deputy Chief Executive and Chief Nurse, Brent. For services to Mental Health Nursing.
- The Reverend Canon Leonard Arthur Piper. For services to the community in the Darlington area, County Durham.
- Christine Edith, Mrs. Pleace. For services to Bryn Celyn Primary School, Cardiff.
- Miss Anne Pollington, Deputy Headteacher, Paddock Wood Primary School, Kent. For services to Education.
- Russell Emanuel Poluck, Chairman, London Taxi Driver of the Year Charity Fund. For services to the Taxi Trade.
- Miss Debra Leonie Poulier, Higher Executive Officer, Home Office.
- Miss Valerie Mary Powell. For services to Medical Emergency Relief International.
- Michael Sinclair Prescod, Member, Wellingborough Borough Council, Northamptonshire. For services to Local Government and to the community.
- Roger Edward Dudley Price, Senior Executive Officer, Employment Service, Department for Education and Employment.
- Ms Maddy Prior. For services to Folk Music.
- Bonnie, Mrs. Purchon, President, Scarborough Hotels Association. For services to the Hospitality Industry in Yorkshire.
- Robert Wilfrid Purdy, Teacher of Art, Design, Graphics and Photography, Regent College, Leicester. For services to Further Education.
- Jason Paul Queally. For services to Cycling.
- Frank Race. For services to the community in Barnsley, South Yorkshire.
- Arthur Henry Douglas Radcliffe. For services to the Bomber Command Association.
- Nicholas Robert Scott-Ram, Consultant. For services to Biotechnology.
- Miss Louise Ramsay. For services to the British Olympic Association.
- William Henry Rawson. For services to the Parish Council and to the community in Bracebridge Heath, Lincoln.
- Maria Grazyna, Mrs. Read. General Medical Practitioner, SheYeld, South Yorkshire. For services to Health Care.
- Yvonne Margaret Mary Eliza, Mrs. Reaney, Music Teacher, Lydgate Infant School, Sheffield, South Yorkshire. For services to Education.
- Beryl, Mrs. Reason. For services to the community in Harrow, London.
- Michael Reed, Business Manager, H.M. Board of Inland Revenue.
- Constance Evelyn, Mrs. Rees. For services to the community, especially the Stevenage and District Multiple Sclerosis Society, in Hertfordshire.
- Linda, Mrs. Reeve, Guest House Manager. For services to Rolls Royce plc.
- Michael William Richards. For services to the Salvation Army Band in Gillingham, Kent.
- Thelma Cassandra, Mrs. Richards, For services to the community, especially the Red Cross, in Reading, Berkshire.
- Neil Mayoh Richardson. For services to OFWAT's Central Customer Service Committee.
- Jack Rivitt. For services to the community in Sparkhill, Birmingham.
- William Patrick Roache, Actor. For services to Television Drama, particularly Coronation Street.
- Brian Roberts, Founder, Rainbow Prints (Wales) Ltd. For services to Industry and to the community in Merthyr, South Wales.
- Ian Forbes Robertson, Prison Officer, H.M. Prison Wandsworth.
- Shirley Ann Robertson. For services to Yachting.
- Stanley Robins, Milkman. For services to the community in Wootton Bassett, Wiltshire.
- Ronald Robinson, lately Member, Coastguard Auxiliary Service. For services to Coastal Safety in Northumberland.
- Teresa Lesley, Mrs. Robinson, VAT and Excise Intelligence Support Officer, H.M. Board of Customs and Excise.
- William Joseph Robinson. For services to Community Relations.
- Stella Teresa, Mrs. Roissetter, Personal Secretary, H.M. Board of Inland Revenue.
- Denis Rooney, Coast and Countryside Manager, National Trust. For services to Conservation of the Durham Coastline.
- Alasdair Eoghann Adrian Rose, Programme Manager for Mathematics, ESPRC. For services to Scientific Administration.
- Joan Mary, Mrs. Roseveare. For services to the Parish Council and to the community in Coningsby, Lincolnshire.
- Ms Pauline Ross. For services to the Arts and to the community.
- Eileen, Mrs. Ruglys. For services to the Oakley Day Centre and to Cranbourne School, Basingstoke, Hampshire.
- Jocelyn Delia Harvie, Mrs. Russell. For services to the community, especially the Stourpaine Playing Fields Association, in Dorset.
- Sandra Anne, Mrs. Russell. For services to the Building Society Movement.
- Sandra, Mrs. Rutter, Cook/Catering Supervisor, Brierton Comprehensive School, Hartlepool, Cleveland. For services to the School Meals Service.
- Robert Michael John Sadler, lately Driver, HMS Dryad, Ministry of Defence.
- Mohammad Sharif Salim, J.P., Chairman, Bury Racial Equality Council. For services to the community in Lancashire and Greater Manchester.
- Richard Geoffrey Salisbury. For services to the European Dairy Farming Event.
- Jean, Mrs. Sandilands. For services to Pupil Welfare at Saltoun Primary School, East Lothian.
- Alice Ena, Mrs. Savage. For services to the North Hartlepool Partnership.
- Paul Joseph Savage, Farmer. For services to Agriculture. Fred Scarlett. For services to Rowing.
- Zena Marjorie, Mrs. Scoley, D.L. For services to the Parish Council and to the community in Martin Moor, Lincolnshire.
- John Robert Edwin Scott. For services to the RNLI. Miss Margaret Ann Scott. For services to Horticulture.
- Susan June, Mrs. Scott. For services to Nursing and to the Royal College of Nursing.
- Elsie May, Mrs. Scullion. For services to the community in Horsham, West Sussex.
- Richard Geoffrey Searle, Managing Director, Searles of Hunstanton. For services to the Holiday Parks Industry.
- David Service. For public service.
- John Sevenoaks, Livestock Dealer. For services to the Farming community in South West England.
- Barry Michael Shaw. For services to Architecture. Christopher John Shaw. For services to Business and to the community in Dalkeith.
- Miss Doreen Shaw, Diocesan Secretary, Girls' Friendly Society, Liverpool. For services to Young People.
- Miss Gloria Sheaves. For services to Ballroom Dancing.
- Barrie Sheedy, Bus Driver, First Mainline. For charitable services in Sheffield, South Yorkshire.
- Robert Horne Shepherd. For services to Scottish Dance Music and to Scottish Culture.
- Thomas Murray Shields. For services to Housing.
- Alastair Douglas Short, General Medical Practitioner, Glasgow. For services to Health Care.
- Josephine Anne, Mrs. Sibley, lately Support Service Manager, Bournemouth and West Hampshire Water plc. For services to the Water Industry and to the community.
- Bernard Grant Sims, Dental Practitioner, London. For services to Forensic Odontology.
- Douglas Sinden. For services to Papworth Hospital, Cambridgeshire.
- James Shand Sivewright, J.P., Director, Capability Scotland. For services to Housing for Disabled People.
- Anthony Guy Smart. For services to the community in Lacey Green and Loosley Row, Buckinghamshire.
- Hamilton Smillie, Business and Community Relations Director, Scottish Power. For services to the Electricity Industry.
- Barbara Ann, Mrs. Smith. For services to Deaf People in Staffordshire.
- Brian Lennox-Smith. For services to Community Health Councils in Wales.
- Carole, Mrs. Smith. For services to Save the Children.
- Douglas Smith. For services to Deaf People in Staffordshire.
- Grenville Smith. For charitable services, through Jailbreak, in Herefordshire.
- James Ralston Smith, Coach Driver, Inverness Traction. For services to Tourism and to the community in Inverness-shire.
- Margery, Mrs. Smith. For services to the Sea Cadet Corps in Merseyside.
- Marjorie Elizabeth, Mrs. Smith. For services to the community, especially the WRVS, in Derby.
- Shirley Elisabeth, Mrs. Smith, Mess Hand, RAF Cottesmore, Ministry of Defence.
- Thomas Smith. For services to the Ambulance Service and to Oncology Patients in Glasgow.
- Thomas Graham Smith. For services to the Parish Council and to the community in Whatcote, Warwickshire.
- Vincent Wilfred Smith, lately Assistant Divisional Manager, Hereford and Worcester Ambulance Service. For services to the Ambulance Service.
- Miss Annetta Smyth. For services to the community, especially the Church Girls' Brigade.
- Kenneth John Snell, Dock Master, Fleet Support Ltd. For services to the Defence Industry.
- John Anthony Snowdon. For services to Amateur Swimming in Scotland.
- Balwant Kaur, Mrs. Soor, Chairperson, Bebe Nanaki Charitable Trust. For international charitable services.
- Ian Caie Spence. For services to the Duke of Edinburgh's award in Grampian.
- Nancy Elaine, Mrs. Spencer. For services to Climate Change Science.
- Christopher Sperring. For services to Conservation and to the Millennium Awards for Conservation.
- Miss Diana Sperry, Information and Communications Technology Co-ordinator, Moat Farm Junior School, Oldbury, West Midlands. For services to Education.
- Nand Krishna Srivastava. For services to Palliative Care in Sandwell, West Midlands.
- Heather Elizabeth, Mrs. Stevenson. For services to the Pharmaceutical Industry.
- Alan Stewart, Force Wildlife Liaison Officer. For services to Tayside Police and the Prevention and Detection of Crimes against Wildlife.
- Miss Marion Mitchell Stewart, Archivist, Dumfries and Galloway Council. For services to Burgh Archives.
- Thomas A. Strain. For services to the YMCA.
- Rosemary Alice, Mrs. Sturges. Chairman, Northam Youth Group. For services to the community in Northam, Devon.
- Tom Sumner. For services to the community in Burley-in-Wharfdale, West Yorkshire.
- Alexander Walter Sutherland, Horticultural Manager, Commonwealth War Graves Commission.
- Leslie Edwin Sutton, Chief Inspector, RSPCA. For services to Animal Welfare in Cornwall.
- Alexander John Taylor. lately Senior Agricultural Adviser. For services to the Scottish Agricultural College.
- Anthea Rosemary, Mrs. Taylor, J.P. For services to the Board of Visitors at H.M. Young Offenders' Institution, Brinsford.
- Eleanor, Mrs. Taylor, lately Head, Scientific Liaison. For services to the Hannah Research Institute.
- Josephine Elizabeth, Mrs. Taylor, Team Manager, Surrey Schools' Athletics and Swimming Teams. For services to Sport in Surrey Schools.
- Philip Douglas Taylor. For services to Darts.
- Stella Alexandra, Mrs. Thomas. For services to the Parliamentary Press Gallery, House of Commons.
- John William Stewart Thompson, B.E.M. For services to the Royal Naval Benevolent Trust.
- Patricia Mary, Mrs. Thomson. For public service.
- Maureen, Mrs. Thorpe. For services to the community in Pontefract, West Yorkshire.
- William Edward Tidy, Cartoonist. For services to Journalism.
- Diana Paula, Mrs. Toeman. For services to the Citizens Advice Bureau in Pimlico, London.
- Barbara Lesley, Mrs. Tonge. For medical and charitable services to the community in Chester and overseas.
- Roy Toogood, Operations Policy Manager, NICO International Services, H.M. Board of Inland Revenue.
- Marcelle, Mrs. Tooley. For services to the Royal Sussex County Hospital, Brighton, East Sussex.
- David William Topham, Senior Administrative OYcer, Derbyshire Fire and Rescue Service. For services to the Fire Service.
- Stephen Patrick Trapmore. For services to Rowing.
- Miss Christine Mary Traxson. For services to the Compact Club 2000 for Young Disadvantaged People.
- Audrey, Mrs. Trewick, lately Banqueting Supervisor, Gosforth Park Hotel, Northumbria. For services to the Hospitality Industry.
- Gena, Mrs. Turgel. For services to the Holocaust Foundation.
- Barbara, Mrs. Turner, Director, Apollo Theatre, Isle of Wight. For services to the Theatre.
- Denis Neville Turner. For services to the Fire Services National Benevolent Fund.
- Joyce, Mrs. Vale. For services to the community in Georgeham and Barnstaple, Devon.
- Alan Henry Vincent, Head of Engineering, GKN Westland Helicopters Ltd. For services to the Defence Industry.
- Fred Walkington, lately Coxswain, Bridlington Lifeboat, RNLI. For services to Maritime Safety.
- Benjamin Wallsworth, M.M., Member, Salford City Metropolitan Borough Council. For services to Planning and Transportation.
- Leslie Graeme Ward. For services to the Animal Procedures Committee.
- Lieutenant Colonel Roy Kenneth Ward (Retd), Director-General, Institute of the Motor Industry. For services to Motoring and to Road Safety.
- Maureen Joan, Mrs. Warden, Grade E1, Ministry of Defence Mail Services.
- Gordon James Ware. Budget Liaison Officer, H.M. Board of Inland Revenue.
- Kenneth Murray Watson, Farmer, Orkney. For services to the Hill Farming Advisory Committee.
- Moira Hepburn, Mrs. Watson. For services to the WRVS at Glenochil Detention Centre, Clackmannanshire.
- Elleston Goodridge Wedderburn, lately Governor, College of North East London. For services to Education.
- James Wellman. For services to Theatrebarn in Worcestershire.
- Kieran Martin West. For services to Rowing.
- Ian George White, lately Regional Waste Manager, Environment Agency. For services to Waste Regulation.
- Ronald Whitehead, T.D. For services to the Cairn Housing Association and to the Elderly People in Glasgow.
- Miss Eileen Margaret Wilby. For services to the community in Great and Little Ouseburn, North Yorkshire.
- Graham Arthur Wilford, lately Managing Director, York Waterworks plc. For services to the Water Industry.
- Colin Wilson. Stationery/Stores Administrative Assistant, H.M. Board of Customs and Excise.
- Graeme Joss Wilson. For services to the Scout Association in Scotland.
- Miss Mary Wines. For charitable services, especially to Christian Aid, in CardiV.
- John Alan Winlow, lately Director of Continuous Improvement, Marshalls plc. For services to the Environment.
- Jane Elizabeth, Mrs. Winter. For services to the community in Buntingford, Hertfordshire.
- Anthony Peter Howard Wood, Director, John Watson and Carter Ltd. For services to the Surveying Profession and to the Construction Industry.
- Nancy Sybil Dagmar, Mrs. Woodman. For services to the community in Liss, Hampshire.
- Robert Geoffrey Worrall. For services to Journalism in Devon.
- Alexander Wright. For services to the community in Greater Easterhouse, Glasgow.
- William Wyllie, J.P., D.L, Governor. For services to Robert Gordon University, Aberdeen.
- Leila, Mrs. Wynbourne. For services to the British Women's International Zionist Organisation.
- Miss Merline Wynter. For services to Health Care for members of Ethnic Minorities in London.
- Barbara, Mrs. Yorke, J.P. For services to the community in Sefton and Formby, Merseyside.
- Colin Seymour Young. For services to Southborough Cricket Club, Kent.
- Raimondo Zavaglia, Constable, South Wales Police. For services to the Police and to the community in CardiV.

== Cook Islands ==
=== Order of the British Empire ===
==== Knight Commander of the Order of the British Empire (KBE) ====
- Dr. Pupuke Robati, O.B.E. For public and community service.

==== Member of the Order of the British Empire (MBE) ====
- Archer Vivian Hosking. For services to telecommunications and the community.

=== British Empire Medal (BEM) ===
- William Kati Heather. For services to sports and the community.
- Moeara Moeara. For services to education and the community.

== Barbados ==
=== Order of the British Empire ===
==== Commander of the Order of the British Empire (CBE) ====
- Michael Robert Clarke. For service to the field of medicine.
- Alan David Grant Hutchinson. For service to manufacturing.

==== Officer of the Order of the British Empire (CBE) ====
- Phyllis Austin Doreen, Mrs. Alleyne. For service to education.
- Harold Lloyd Vincent Griffith. For public service.

==== Member of the Order of the British Empire (MBE) ====
- Colin Ollievierre Leroy Deane. For service in the field of cricket.
- The Reverend Laurence George Small. For service to religion and the public.

== Grenada ==
=== Order of the British Empire ===
==== Officer of the Order of the British Empire (OBE) ====
- Father Claudius Mark Haynes. For service to religion.
- Raymond Anthony Smith. For public service.

==== Member of the Order of the British Empire (MBE) ====
- Sheila, Mrs. Coomansingh. For service to teaching.
- Lawrence Lambert. For public service.

=== British Empire Medal (BEM) ===
- Stressman McDonald Thomas. For services to the fishing industry.

== Papua New Guinea ==
=== Knight Bachelor ===
- Peter Leslie Charles Barter, O.B.E. For public service.
- Robert John Sinclair. For service to business, community and the country.

=== Order of the British Empire ===
==== Knight Commander of the Order of the British Empire (KBE) ====
- Soekandar Tjandra, M.B.E. For services to politics and the community.

==== Commander of the Order of the British Empire (CBE) ====
- Napoleon Boiyou Liosi. For services to the community.

==== Officer of the Order of the British Empire (OBE) ====
Civil Division

- David Anggo. For foreign service and services to industry and trade.
- Kosta George Constantinou. For services to the community
- Toby Setareki Davis. For services to education.
- The Honourable Philemon Teiel Embel. For services to politics and the community.
- Les Gavara Nanu. For service to the private sector.
- Hosea Tubarat. For service to the community and sports.

Military Division

- Colonel Paul Dala. For service to the Papua New Guinea Defence Force

==== Member of the Order of the British Empire (MBE) ====
Civil Division

- Joseph Martin Chow Sun Yau. For service to business and the community.
- Anna Bungtabu, Mrs. Diuvia. For services to the community and women's affairs.
- Superintendent Charley Farari. For service to the Papua New Guinea Correctional Service.
- Jamie Maxtone-Graham. For public service.
- Pastor Yauri Hibo. For services to religion.
- Simon Kenehe. For service to Papua New Guinea Red Cross.
- Ms. Margaret Samei. For services to health and the public.
- Dr. Mark Solon. For service to education.
- Willie Taugau. For public service.
- George Manua Telek. For service to the development of local music.
- Eleana, Mrs. Tjandraneagera. For services to business and the community.
- Aimungyu Umauma. For service to education.

Military Division

- Chief Warrant Officer Paul Mate. For services to the Papua New Guinea Defence Force.

=== Imperial Service Order (ISO) ===
- Ano Pala. For public service

=== British Empire Medal (BEM) ===
- Aniani Bau. For services to the Royal Papua New Guinea Constabulary.
- Kuman Dai. For services to politics.
- Emily, Mrs. David. For foreign service.
- Petrus Fongai. For public service.
- Samuel Francis. For service to the community.
- Kaigro Gene. For services to the community.
- Albert Sari Ivaraoa. For services to the community.
- Bulon Katam. For services to the community.
- Anthony Kevin. For public service.
- Sergeant Major Henry Tominge Levi. For services to the Papua New Guinea Correctional Service.
- Mea Mavara. For services to the community and religion.
- Tarato Nama. For services to the community.
- Mathias Naur. For services to religion.
- Thomas Ninji. For services to the community.
- Karara Ove. For services to the Health Department.
- Sergeant Reginald Panua. For services to the Police.
- Wigal Par. For services to the community.
- The Reverend Riley Haiwatha Sampson. For services to the community and religion.
- Herman Adan Sinyoi. For services to education.
- Luk Tindom. For services to the government.
- George Pukalur Wauleau. For public service.
- John Olinakuan Yapli. For services to the government.
- Payake Yayuti. For service to the Eastern Highlands.

== Saint Vincent and the Grenadines ==
=== Order of Saint Michael and Saint George ===
==== Companion of the Order of St Michael and St George (CMG) ====
- Richard Walter Joachim, O.B.E. For public service.

=== Order of the British Empire ===
==== Officer of the Order of the British Empire (OBE) ====
- Martin James Edward Barnard. For service to the private sector.
- Kerwyn Leslie Morris. For service to the fishing industry.

==== Member of the Order of the British Empire (MBE) ====
- Major St. Claire Augustus Leacock, J.P. For public service.
- Irma Agatha, Mrs. Norris. For services to teaching and the community.
- Alderic Wendell Wright, J.P. For services to policing.

== Belize ==
=== Order of the British Empire ===
==== Commander of the Order of the British Empire (CBE) ====
- John Lewis Charles Crump. For services to the community.

==== Officer of the Order of the British Empire (OBE) ====
- Brigadier General Robert Sydney Garcia. For service to Belize.
- Francis Usher. For service to Belize.

==== Member of the Order of the British Empire (MBE) ====
- Benjamin Nicholas. For services to the Arts.
- Francis Reneau. For service in the field of music.
- Joan Louise Ellenstein, Mrs. Samuels. For services to education and the community.
- Gilvano Reynaldo Swasey. For services to the Arts.

== Saint Christopher and Nevis ==
=== Order of the British Empire ===
==== Member of the Order of the British Empire (MBE) ====
- Dr. Stanley Mirk Dennis. For service to the field of education.
- Samuel James Nathaniel. For public service.
