= Turgel =

Turgel may refer to:

- Türi, German name Turgel, a town in Järva County, Estonia
- Gena Turgel (1923–2018), Polish author, educator and Holocaust survivor
