= Sharon Hollows =

British educator, consultant and businesswoman

Dame Sharon Hollows, DBE (born 14 December 1958) is an English schoolteacher and headteacher who was awarded a DBE in the 2001 New Year Honours for services to education.

Born in Burnley to Jack and Margaret Hollows, Hollows' first headship was at Calverton Primary School in Newham in 1994, pupils' performance was very poor. By 1999, when the primary school National Curriculum assessment results were published, the score 11-year-olds achieved across the three subjects in the national curriculum tests had risen to 269 – up from 45 in 1994. The school was the most improved in the country. In 2001 the performance went up again, to 287, far above the national average, with most of the students being of African, Asian or Eastern European descent.

Hollows was the principal at Ark Charter Academy, a Church of England secondary school in Portsmouth, which is sponsored by ARK Schools. She left the post in 2016.

== Damehood ==
Hollows' work was formally recognised in 2001 when she became a Dame Commander of the Order of the British Empire.

== Personal ==
Hollows successfully sued the NHS on behalf of her blind daughter for £1.5 million.

== Accolades ==
At the Children Left Behind Conservative Party conference on the state of British schools, Hollows earned the following praise: "Another example of transformational leadership is Sharon Hollows, who took the headship of Calverton Primary School in Newham in 1994. Like Whalley Range, Calverton was in a very poor state when she took over, yet Ms Hollows succeeded in raising the score that her eleven-year-olds achieve in their national curriculum tests from just 45 in 1994 to 287 today. Having raised its performance from well below to well above the national average, Calverton became the most improved school in the country, despite most of its pupils being from families for whom English is not a first language. Ms. Hollows reports that one of the keys to her approach was involving parents more, drawing up 'home-school contracts' before they became a national requirement".
