= Charles David Curtis =

British geologist

Charles David Curtis OBE (born 1939) is a British geologist who has served as president of the Geological Society of London from 1992 to 1994. He is an emeritus professor of geochemistry at the University of Manchester. Curtis read chemistry and geochemistry at Imperial College and the University of Sheffield.

Curtis was chair of the Radioactive Waste Management Advisory Committee until 2004. He has been the Head of Research and Development Strategy, Radioactive Waste Management Directorate, Nuclear Decommissioning Authority (formerly Nirex) since 2007, and is a non-executive director of Dounreay Site Restoration Limited.

Curtis was awarded the Murchison Medal by the Geological Society of London in 1987 and he was awarded an OBE in the 2001 New Year Honours for "contributions to environmental and radioactive waste management science".
