= Rowena Arshad =

Scottish rights campaigner and academic (born 1960)

Professor Rowena Arshad CBE, FEIS
- Born: 27 April 1960 (age 65)
- Known for: Scottish race and equality scholar and campaigner.

Academic background
- Education: Bulmershe College, Moray House Institute of Education, University of Edinburgh
- Thesis: Teacher activism in equity and anti-discrimination in Scotland : an interpretive study (2009)
- Doctoral advisor: Jenny Ozga

Rowena Arshad CBE, FEIS (born 27 April 1960) was Chair in Multicultural and Anti-Racist Education and Co-Director of the Centre for Education for Racial Equality in Scotland (CERES) Moray House School of Education and Sport at the University of Edinburgh. Her doctorate was an interpretive study of teacher activism in equity and anti-discrimination in Scotland and her ongoing research is into equity and anti-discrimination issues in education (school, community education and tertiary) and within educational policy.She retired in July 2020 and now holds the position of Professor Emerita at the University of Edinburgh.

Rowena was an Equal Opportunities Commissioner for Scotland 2001-2007. She sat on the Educational Broadcasting Commission Scotland. She was awarded her OBE in 2001 for services to race equality in Scotland and her CBE for services to equality and education in 2019. She chaired the Scottish government working group in November 2017 to look at increasing the number of teachers from under-represented minority groups at all levels in Scottish schools She was a member of the Scottish Further and Higher Education Funding Council from 1999 -2009 and a board member on Her Majesty's Inspectorate for Education, the Scottish Committee of the Equality and Human Rights Commission and the Scottish Government Independent Advisory Group on Hate Crime, Prejudice and Community Cohesion. She has an honorary doctorate from Edinburgh Napier University in 2010 for services to gender equality. Arshad retired from University of Edinburgh and as Professor Emerita continues to comment on issues regarding race and education in Scotland.
