= Richard Louis Ormond =

British art historian (born 1939)

Richard L. Ormond
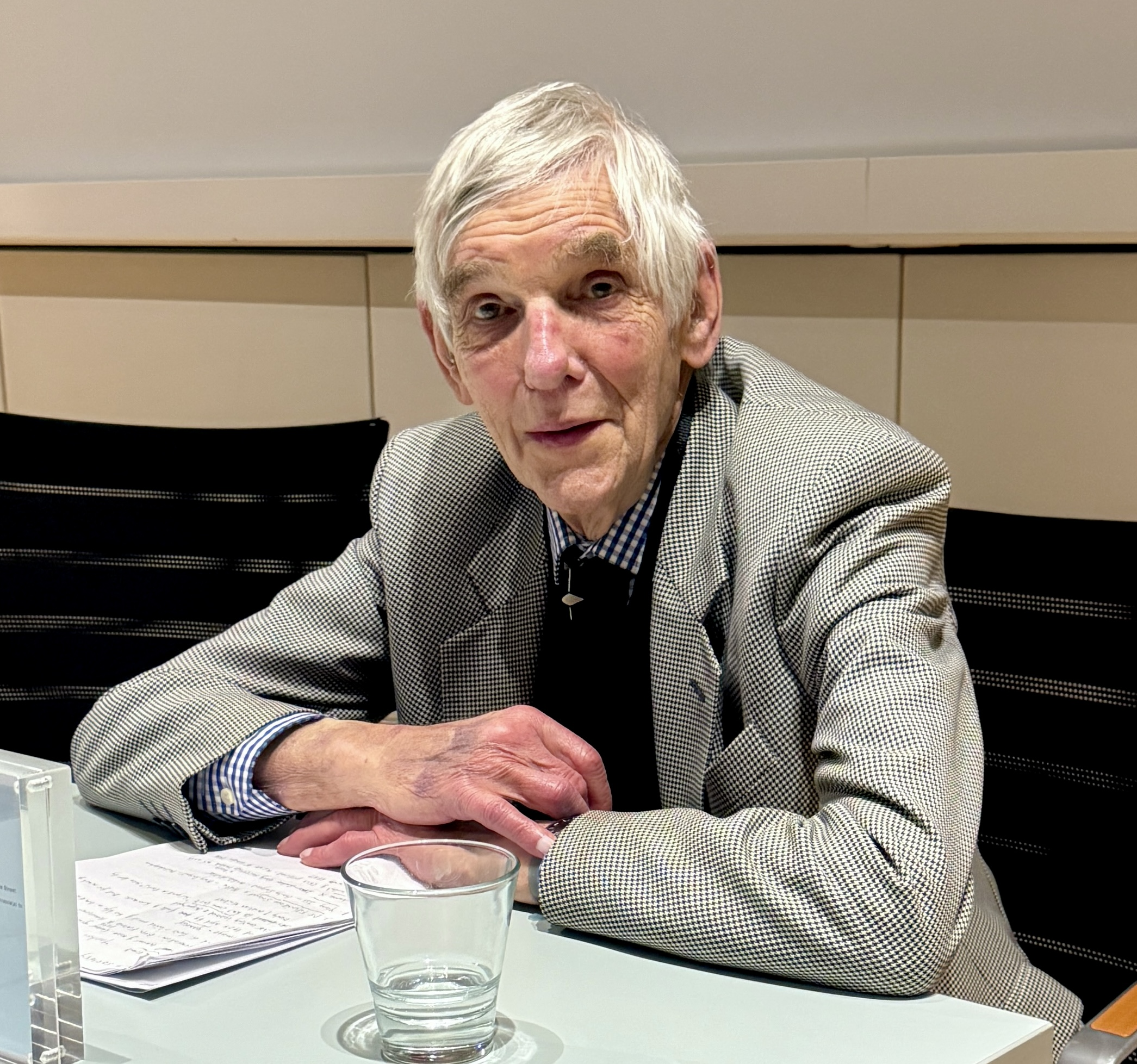
- Richard Ormond, Royal Society of Medicine (2026)
- Born: 1939 (age 86–87)
- Occupation: Art historian

Richard Louis Ormond CBE (born 16 January 1939) is the former Director of the National Maritime Museum (1986–2000). He was the Assistant Keeper and later Deputy Director of the National Portrait Gallery. He served as the Chairman of the Trustees of the Watts Gallery from 1987 to 2019. He is also the Chairman of the Friends of Leighton House and a trustee of the Mariners Museum in Newport News, Virginia. In addition, he is an author and biographer.

== Biography ==
Ormond is the son of Henri Eric Conrad Ormond (1898–1979), who was the second husband of Dorethea Charlotte Gibbons; they married in 1934. She was the daughter of Sir Alexander Doran Gibbons, 7th Baronet. Ormond is the grandson of Violet Sargent Ormond, sister of John Singer Sargent.

In 1963, Ormond married Leonee Jasper. She was one of the Directors of Apsley House.
