= St Claudine's Catholic School for Girls =

Catholic girls' school in Harlesden, London, England

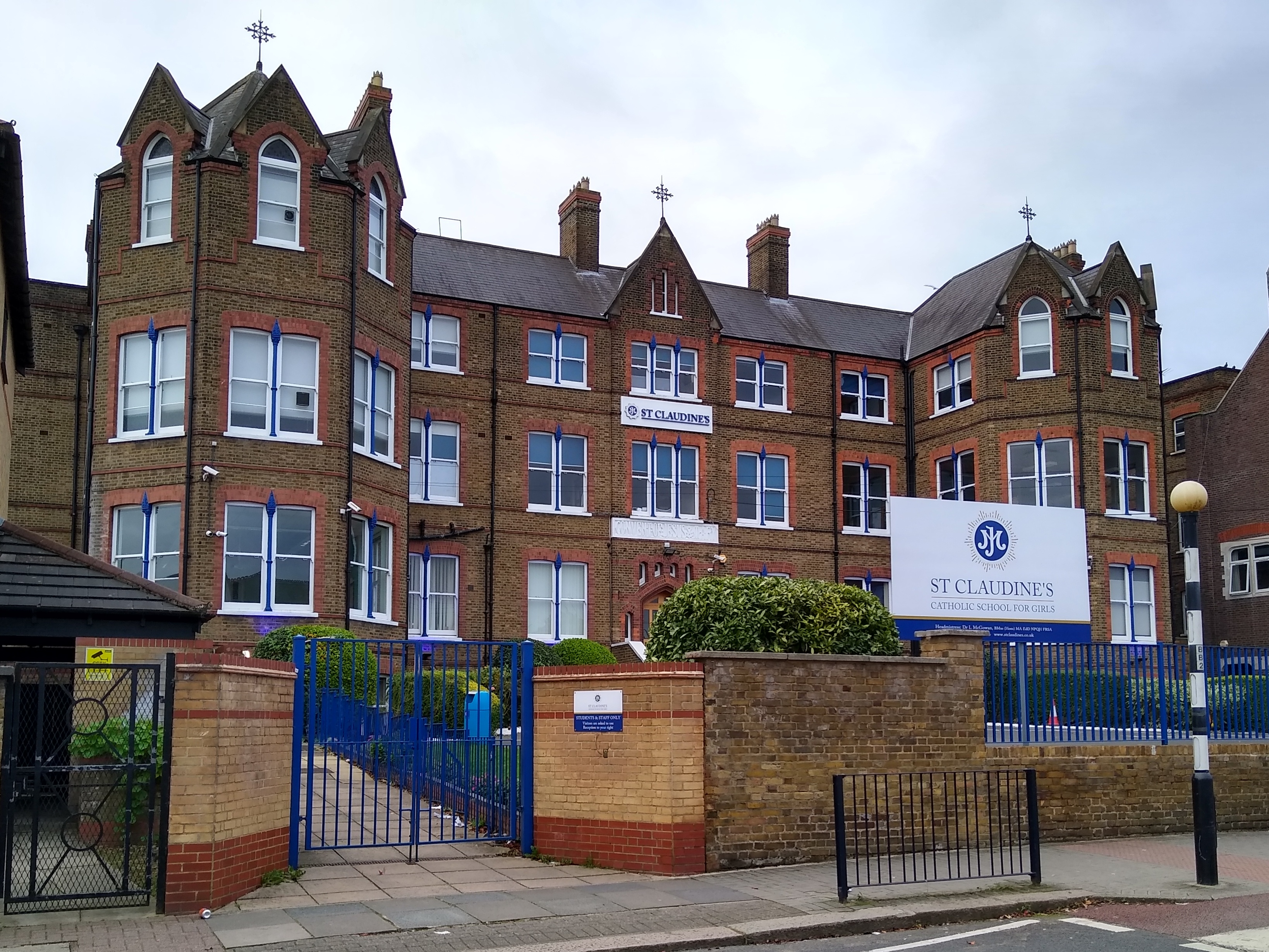

Location
- Crownhill Road; Harlesden, London, NW10 4EP; England
- Coordinates: 51°32′18″N 0°14′46″W

Information
- Type: Academy
- Religious affiliation: Roman Catholic
- Established: 1886
- Founders: Religious of Jesus and Mary
- Department for Education URN: 137994 Tables
- Ofsted: Reports
- Chair: Danny Finnegan
- Head teacher: Louise McGowan
- Gender: Girls
- Age: 11 to 18
- Enrolment: 1100~
- Colours: Blue and Yellow
- Website: http://www.cjmlc.co.uk

St Claudine's Catholic School for Girls (formerly Convent of Jesus and Mary Language College) is a girls' Catholic secondary school in Harlesden within the London Borough of Brent. It gained specialism in modern languages since 1996 and became an academy in September 2012.

== History ==
The Religious of Jesus and Mary, who originated in France, were invited by Cardinal Manning to open a convent school in Willesden. The school's foundation stone was laid in 1888 and the Convent of Jesus and Mary opened as a private boarding school for girls, although boarding was scrapped at the outbreak of World War II. It was the first of three convent schools established by the Sisters in the present-day borough; the second convent school is now the local parish infant school. During the era of the tripartite system, the convent was unique as it operated as a bilateral school offering both grammar and secondary modern streams.

During the 1950s-60s, the school went through a period of major redevelopment. In 1952, as with many Catholic schools across the country, it joined the state sector as a voluntary aided school and maintained this status until April 2012 when the school converted to an academy. A number of Catholic schools nearby were reorganised into primary/junior and infant schools and their senior pupils were all transferred to the Convent. The main Convent itself was split in two as younger pupils were transferred to the second convent school (now Convent of Jesus and Mary Infant School). It became a comprehensive in 1966 with the abolition of the tripartite system in the borough.

In 2021 the school changed its name from Convent of Jesus and Mary Language College to St Claudine's Catholic School for Girls.

Today the school continues to serve the Catholic community in the borough and welcomes girls of all faiths or none. The school is a diverse community with around three-quarters of the students coming from minority ethnic groups. Roughly a third of students are of Afro-Caribbean heritage or other Black backgrounds.

== Achievements ==
In recent times the school has been awarded accolades such as the International School Award in 2008. In 2009, the school was rated "outstanding" in both the Ofsted and Diocesan inspection reports.

In 2000, long-serving head teacher Mary Richardson (née Habgood; born 26 February 1936), BA, PGCE, who had retired the previous year, was created a Dame Commander of the Order of the British Empire (DBE) for her outstanding work at the school. When Richardson arrived at the school in 1985 only 8% of pupils left with more than 5A*-C GCSEs; this rose to 61% on her retirement in 1999.

== Notable former pupils ==
- Cait O'Riordan (b. 1965) - musician, former bass player for The Pogues
- Lenora Crichlow (b. 1985) - actress

=== Convent of Jesus & Mary ===
- Judy Grinham, swimmer who won the gold in the 1956 Olympic 100m backstroke in Melbourne
- Anna Quayle (1932-2019) - actress
- Jane Scott (b. 1947) - Baroness Scott of Bybrookm, politician
