= Michael Leifer =

British international relations scholar (1933–2001)

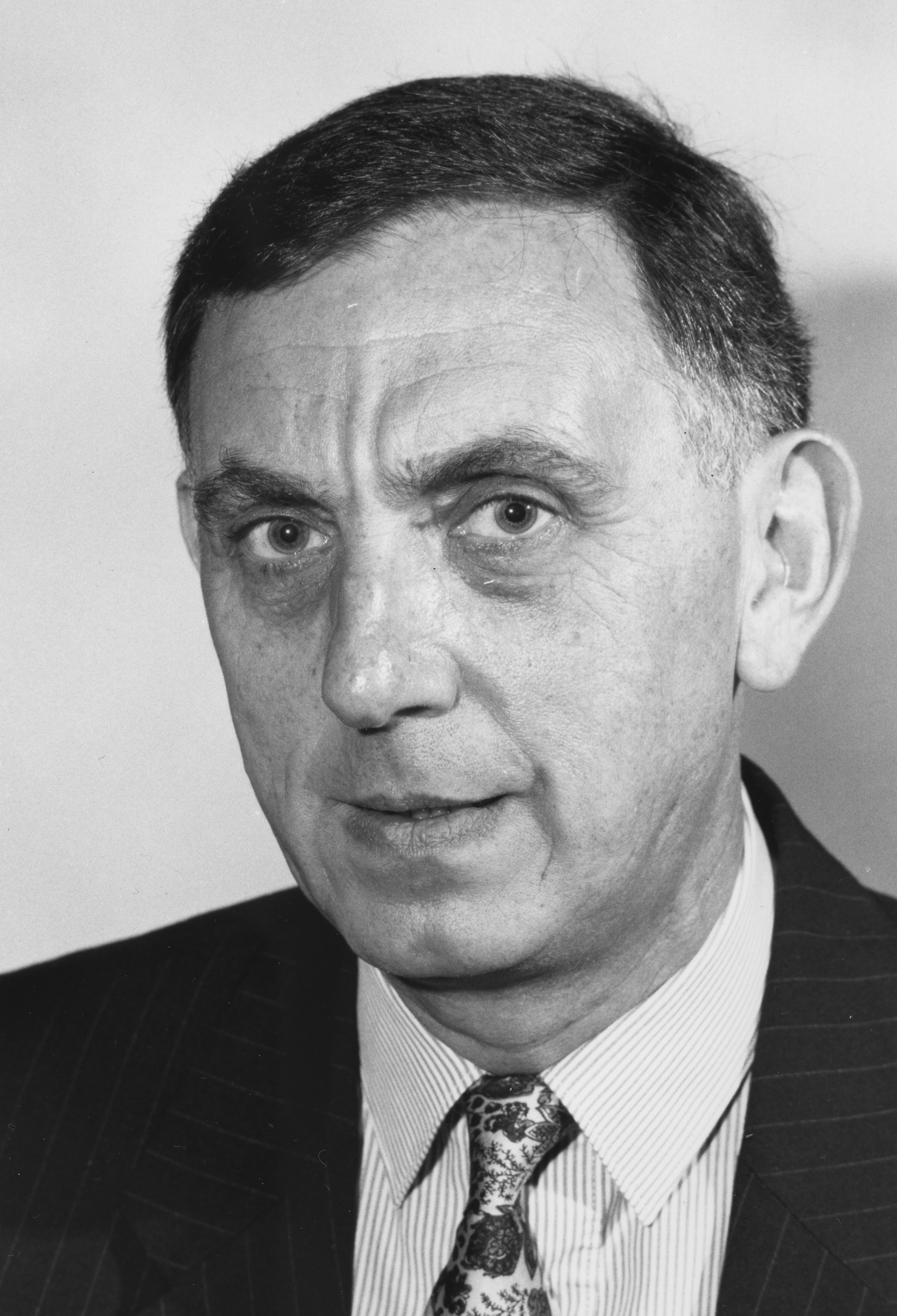
Michael Leifer

Michael Leifer CMG (November 15, 1933 – March 21, 2001) was a British International Relations scholar specialising in the politics and international relations of South East Asia.

He was a professor of international relations at the London School of Economics and also served as its pro-director from 1991-1995.

Leifer studied Political Economy at the University of Reading and subsequently took his doctorate at the London School of Economics in 1959 with a dissertation on "Zionism and Palestine in British Opinion and Policy, 1945-1949". Prior to his death in 2001 he was awarded the Companion Medal of the 'Most Distinguished Order of Saint Michael and Saint George' for his work in academia and study of Southeast Asia.

== Bibliography ==
- Michael Leifer: Selected Works on Southeast Asia, compiled and edited by Chin Kin Wah and Leo Suryadinata, Singapore: Institute of Southeast Asian Studies, 2005
- Dictionary of the modern politics of South-East Asia, - 3. ed. - London : Routledge, 2001
- Asian nationalism, London : Routledge, 2000
- Singapore's foreign policy : coping with vulnerability, London : Routledge, 2000
- The ASEAN Regional Forum : a model for cooperative security in the Middle East, Canberra : Dept. of International Relations, Research School of Pacific and Asian Studies (RSPAS), Australian National University (ANU), 1998
- The Asean regional forum : extending ASEAN's model of regional security, London : Oxford Univ. Press, 1996
- Dictionary of the modern politics of South-East Asia, London : Routledge, 1995
- Vietnam and Doi Moi : domestic and international dimensions of reform, London, 1991
- Cambodian conflict : the final phase?, London : Centre for Security and Conflict Studies, 1989
- ASEAN and the security of South-East Asia, London : Routledge, 1989
- The balance of power in East Asia, Basingstoke, Hampshire : Macmillan, 1986
- Indonesia's foreign policy, London : The Royal Institute of International Affairs, 1983
- Conflict and regional order in South-east Asia, London : International Institute for Strategic Studies, 1980
- Malacca, Singapore, and Indonesia, Alphen aan den Rijn : Sijthoff & Noordhoff, 1978
- Dilemmas of statehood in Southeast Asia, Vancouver : Univ. of British Columbia Press and Singapore : Asia Pacific Press, 1972
- Constraints and adjustments in British foreign policy, London : Allen & Unwin, 1972
- Nationalism revolution and evolution in South-East Asia, Zug : Inter Doc., 1970
- The Philippine claim to Sabah, Zug : Inter Documentation Company, 1968
- Cambodia : the search for security, London : Pall Mall P, 1967
