= Gena Turgel =

Holocaust survivor (1923–2018)

- Gena Turgel at her wedding, 1945
- Born: Gena Goldfinger; 1 February 1923; Kraków, Poland
- Died: 7 June 2018 (aged 95)
- Occupations: Author, educator
- Spouse: Norman Turgel (m. 1945; died 1995)
- Children: 3
- Relatives: Miriam Goldfinger, Janek Goldfinger, Hela Goldfinger, Willek Goldfinger
- Writing career
- Language: English, Polish
- Period: 1987–2018
- Genres: Memoir, essay
- Notable work: I Light a Candle

Gena Turgel (née Goldfinger; 1 February 1923 – 7 June 2018) was a Jewish Polish author, educator, and Holocaust survivor.

== Early life and the Holocaust ==
Turgel was born in Kraków in 1923, the youngest of nine children of Samuel and Estera Goldfinger. Her parents ran a small textile business. After the death of her father, during her childhood, her mother carried on the family business. When the Nazis invaded Poland in 1939, her family was ordered to give up all their belongings. Turgel, several siblings and her mother were forced to move to the Kraków ghetto in August 1941.

Her brother Willek was shot and killed by the SS through the window of their home while he stood on a chair beside the window to reach a suitcase on top of a wardrobe. Another brother, Janek, escaped and Turgel never saw him after that. On 1 March 1942, Gena, her mother, and her sisters Miriam and Hela were sent to the Kraków-Płaszów concentration camp. Turgel's sister Miriam and her husband were shot after being caught trying to smuggle food into the camp.

Gena, Estela, and Hela were then part of the last forced march from Płaszów to Auschwitz-Birkenau in December 1944. Months later she was part of the "death march" to Buchenwald before finally being sent to Bergen-Belsen concentration camp.

She survived the bombing of Poland and the Bergen-Belsen concentration camp.

== Personal life ==
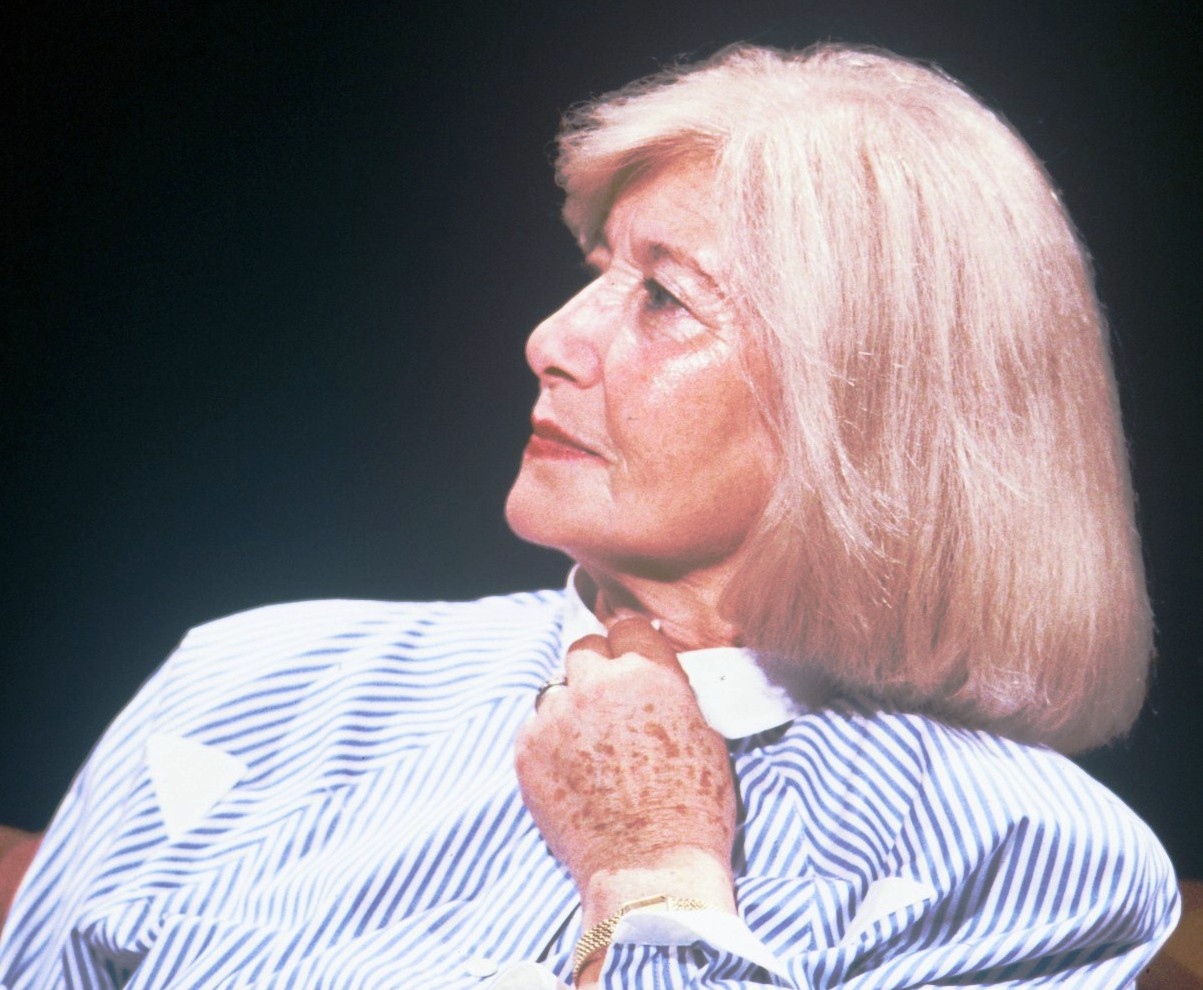
Appearing on After Dark in 1987, more here.

Gena married a British soldier, Norman Turgel, after the liberation of Bergen-Belsen and the British press called her "the Bride of Belsen." The ceremony was officiated by Jewish British Army chaplain Padre Capt. Leslie Henry Hardman. Her wedding dress, made from a British Army parachute, is an exhibit in the Imperial War Museum in London. Norman held a party to celebrate his engagement to Gena at Belsen having been granted permission to do so by Major Leonard Berney, the commander of the Bergen-Belsen Displaced Persons Camp (as it was then called). Norman Turgel died in 1995.

Her memoir, I Light a Candle, was published in 1987. She spent much of her life educating British school pupils about the Holocaust.

== Death ==
She died on 7 June 2018, at the age of 95 in England. Upon news of her death, Britain's chief rabbi, Ephraim Mirvis, called her a "truly remarkable Holocaust Survivor," and said, "Her legacy is our responsibility now."
