= Salisbury Sports Club tournament in 1970 =

Tournament and related controversy in Rhodesia

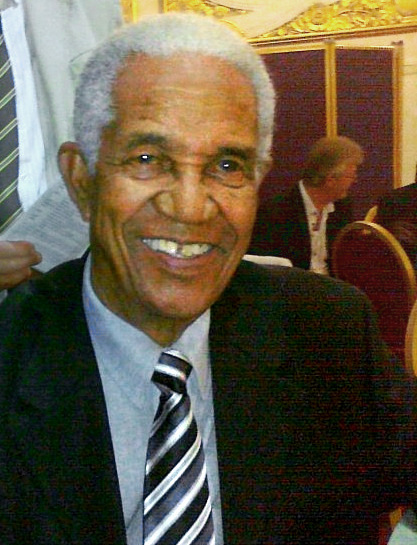
Sir Garfield Sobers in 2012

Garfield Sobers, captain of the West Indies cricket team and one of the most prominent cricketers in the world, outraged many in the Caribbean in September 1970 when he took part in a friendly double-wicket tournament at Salisbury Sports Club in Rhodesia (renamed Zimbabwe in 1980), a country in southern Africa that was unrecognised internationally because of its mostly white minority government. The resulting furore nearly caused him to lose the captaincy, and threatened the unity of the West Indies team itself.

Sobers was captain of the "Rest of the World" team that toured England between May and August 1970 in place of the South Africa national team, whose proposed tour had been cancelled by English cricketing authorities because of apartheid. He accepted an invitation to the Rhodesian competition from Eddie Barlow, a South African member of the Rest of the World team, and arrived in Salisbury on the day of the event. To ecstatic applause from the mostly white spectators, Sobers partnered South African Test captain Ali Bacher in the tournament, and said afterwards that he had enjoyed himself, though he and Bacher had not won. Having established a personal rapport with the Rhodesian Prime Minister, Ian Smith, Sobers left the next day and returned home to Barbados.

Many in the West Indies were appalled by Sobers' actions, and when he subsequently made positive comments about Smith, Rhodesia and white South African cricketers in press interviews and announced his intention to play more cricket in Rhodesia, the vitriol intensified, with one Antiguan newspaper branding him a "white black man". A number of prominent figures, including entire political parties, called for Sobers to be stripped of the West Indies cricket captaincy. Guyanese Prime Minister Forbes Burnham barred Sobers from Guyana, and Prime Minister Indira Gandhi of India announced that if Sobers remained in the team, India would pull out of its upcoming tour of the West Indies. Sobers argued that as a "professional cricketer and a sportsman, not a politician", he had done nothing wrong.

The West Indies Cricket Board (WICB) contemplated whether it would be better to cancel all matches in Guyana or to sack Sobers; neither prospect was attractive. The crisis ended when Eric Williams, the Prime Minister of Trinidad and Tobago, wrote a letter of apology for Sobers to sign, which was relayed to the WICB and several governmental bodies in late October 1970. This was accepted, and the incident was soon largely forgotten. Sobers regained his overwhelming popularity with West Indian cricket fans, continued as team captain until 1972 and retired from cricket two years later. He thereafter retained his stance that politics should not interfere with sport. His Rhodesian visit has been cited as precursoring the South African rebel tours controversy of the 1980s.

== Background ==
Garfield Sobers, from the Caribbean island of Barbados, was widely regarded as one of the world's finest cricketers from the late 1950s to the early 1970s, and is placed by many among the best to ever play the sport. An all-rounder, he made his debut for the West Indies cricket team, the multinational side representing the Caribbean in international cricket, at the age of 17 in 1954. He was a regular member of the team for the next two decades. Sobers set a then-world record highest individual score of 365 runs not out during a Test match against Pakistan in 1958, and became captain of the West Indies team six years later. In domestic first-class cricket, he was one of the first West Indians to play abroad, representing South Australia and Nottinghamshire during the 1960s and 1970s. His batting, bowling and fielding were all regarded as excellent by contemporaries, but his decision making and tactics were occasionally criticised.

Rhodesia was an unrecognised state in southern Africa, run by a predominantly white minority government headed by Prime Minister Ian Smith. Taking exception to the UK's insistence on a set timetable for majority rule as a condition for independence, Smith's colonial administration had unilaterally declared independence in 1965 following a long dispute over the terms. International uproar and the first ever United Nations economic sanctions had ensued, making Rhodesia deeply isolated. This quarantine variously extended to sports. Rhodesian athletes, including the 1968, 1972 and 1976 Olympic squads (which were racially integrated), were barred from international competition on political grounds. Rhodesian cricket and rugby were not greatly affected as these sports largely operated in tandem with South Africa. The Rhodesia cricket team, for example, took part in the annual Currie Cup tournament against South African provincial sides.

As world opinion hardened against South Africa during the 1960s because of apartheid, international governing bodies in various sports introduced boycotts of South African teams and athletes. Until 1976, non-whites were legally barred from the South Africa cricket team, and, as the law required matches to be racially homogenous, this also applied to visiting squads. The South African government provoked overseas ire in 1968 when it refused entry to the England cricket team because its proposed tour party included Basil D'Oliveira, a Cape Coloured. Amid the ensuing scandal, Marylebone Cricket Club (which then governed English cricket) called off the tour. Two years later, a tour of England by the South Africa cricket team was cancelled by the English Test and County Cricket Board (TCCB) at a week's notice following public protests and immense pressure from the UK government. South Africa did not play another official international cricket match until 1991.

The TCCB sought to recoup the lost revenues for the 1970 season by hastily organising a replacement series of matches between England and a "Rest of the World" team comprising leading cricketers from around the world. This squad, described by the leading cricket publication Wisden Cricketers' Almanack as "one of the strongest teams ever to take the field", included five South Africans, five West Indians (including Sobers, as captain), two Pakistanis and a player each from Australia and India. It defeated England 4–1 over a tour lasting from late June to late August 1970.

== Sobers in Rhodesia ==
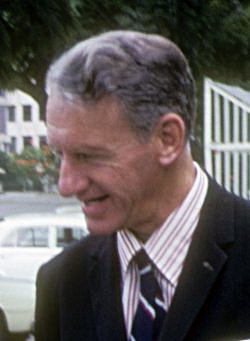
Rhodesian Prime Minister Ian Smith attended the tournament and had dinner with Sobers afterwards.

Eddie Barlow, one of the South African members of the Rest of the World team, suggested to Sobers towards the end of the English series that the West Indian might like to take part in a friendly double-wicket competition in the Rhodesian capital Salisbury on 12 September, the local Pioneers' Day holiday. (Note: Double-wicket cricket is a variant of the sport in which pairs of players each are pitted against each other. Each team bats for one innings (comprising a set number of overs), bowls for a certain number of overs, and fields for the rest. Getting out causes a batsman to have a set number of runs deducted from his side's score. The winning team is that with the highest final total of runs after all pairs have batted.) Barlow was one of several prominent South African cricketers already booked to play. Sobers was initially noncommittal, but decided to go following assurances that Rhodesia did not practise apartheid and there would be no racial discrimination regarding team selection. Sobers' intended participation became public on 7 September when a London newspaper reported on it; widespread condemnation of the West Indian captain followed, but he still travelled, landing in Salisbury early on the day of the event.

Sobers was enthusiastically received in Salisbury by blacks and whites alike; he described the reception and hospitality as "wonderful" and "just great". After a few hours' rest, he made his way to Salisbury Sports Club for the competition, in which he partnered the South African Test captain Ali Bacher, whom he had never met. Sobers received £600 for appearing. The largely white capacity crowd gave the Barbadian a hero's welcome, accompanying his walk out to the wicket with a standing ovation and a chorus of "For He's a Jolly Good Fellow". Having flown in just that morning, Sobers underperformed, and he and Bacher did not win. All the same, the other teams formed a guard of honour for them as they left the field. Bacher found Sobers be "a great guy with no airs or graces"; he suggested to his teammate that he should consider also playing in South Africa.

Sobers spent part of the day sitting with Ian Smith in the stands. Both reported enjoying the occasion; Smith, a keen sports fan and a talented player in his day, fondly recounted his "lovely day discussing the great men of cricket" with Sobers in his memoirs, while Sobers recalled the Rhodesian premier as "a tremendous person to talk to". After the tournament ended, they continued their conversation over dinner. Smith told Sobers that he was welcome to come back to Rhodesia whenever he liked. Sobers left the next day, after less than 48 hours in the country, and returned home to Barbados on 15 September 1970.

== Controversy ==
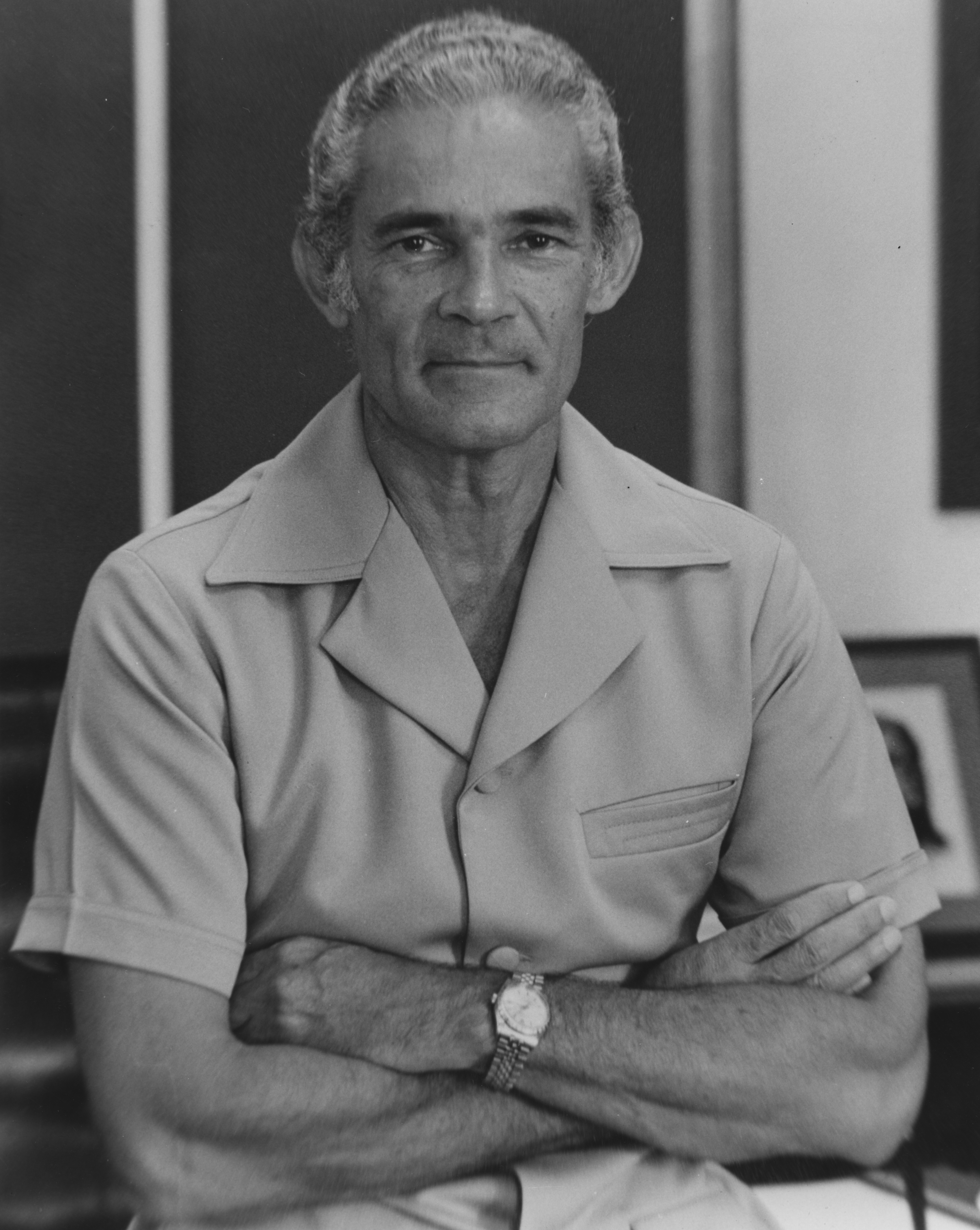
Jamaican politician Michael Manley was among those who criticised Sobers on his return to the West Indies.

Sobers was met in Bridgetown by an enormous and hostile press storm. "To say there was an uproar in the Caribbean is comprehensively to understate what took place," the Jamaican politician Michael Manley later wrote in his History of West Indies Cricket. The Antigua Labour Party's Workers' Voice newspaper damned Sobers as "a white black man" and charged that by playing in Rhodesia, he had "abdicated his loyalty to Africans everywhere, and all West Indians in particular". Manley's opinion was that if Sobers did not apologise, he "may not be welcomed anywhere by people who believe that justice is bigger than even sport". Frank Walcott of the Barbados Workers' Union, who was a personal friend of Sobers, publicly called for his captaincy of the West Indies to be revoked, as did many others. Sobers told reporters at Seawell Airport that he had "never been bothered about criticism, and I do not see why I should start now". Sympathy for Sobers amid the affair came mainly from his fellow Barbadians. Vernon Jamadar, Leader of the Opposition in Trinidad and Tobago, praised Sobers' "calm dignity in response to the primitive savagery of West Indian gutter politicians".

Sobers told the media that he had played in Rhodesia as he felt it would be good for cricket, particularly after the cancellation of the South African tour of England, and that politics had not entered his mind. He told interviewers that he had had no problems whatsoever in Rhodesia, that sport in Rhodesia appeared to him to be integrated and that he intended to accept Smith's invitation to return there in the future to play more cricket. Reporting Bacher's suggestion of playing in South Africa, Sobers said that he probably would not do so: "I don't know if I would want to get involved in that," he said, "but it does show that South African cricketers are willing to play with and against players of any colour, race or creed." Sobers said that the white South African members of the Rest of the World squad in England had functioned well as part of the multiracial team, and that he hoped for a similar Rest of the World series in the Caribbean as he believed West Indian cricket fans would enjoy seeing the South African players. He expressed confusion regarding the calls for him to be stripped of his captaincy. "I am a professional cricketer and a sportsman, not a politician," he said. "I went to play cricket. I don't see why this should affect my position as captain of the West Indies team."

The crisis deepened on 10 October 1970, when Guyanese Prime Minister Forbes Burnham announced that Sobers would not be allowed to enter Guyana until he apologised. This was a major issue for the West Indies Cricket Board (WICB) as the team played at least one Test match a year in Georgetown, the Guyanese capital. The Jamaica Labour Party called for Sobers to resign as captain four days later; Indira Gandhi, the Indian Prime Minister, then announced that if Sobers were not removed from the West Indies team, India would cancel its upcoming tour of the West Indies, scheduled for early 1971. The WICB considered its options. Cancelling matches in Guyana might prompt Burnham to instruct Guyanese members of the West Indian team to boycott, and sacking Sobers might cause Barbados to withdraw in protest; either way, the unity of the West Indies team was threatened. Meanwhile, no sign of an apology emanated from Sobers.

== Apology, resolution and legacy ==
Taking matters into his own hands, the Prime Minister of Trinidad and Tobago Eric Williams wrote an apology letter for Sobers to sign, addressed to WICB president Noel Pierce, and had it delivered to the West Indies captain by the Barbadian fast bowler Wes Hall. The letter explained that Sobers had not known of the "deep feelings of the West Indian people" on Rhodesia, that he now better understood the political issues, and that he would not go to the southern African country again. "I therefore wish to convey to you and the members of the board my sincere regrets for any embarrassment which my action may have caused, and to assure you of my unqualified dedication whenever I may be called upon to represent my country—the West Indies—and my people," it concluded. Sobers signed, and the apology was promptly conveyed to the WICB in late October 1970, with copies also going to the council of the West Indies Associated States and the prime ministerial offices of Barbados, Guyana, Trinidad and Tobago and Jamaica. "A grateful Caribbean grabbed the apology with both hands," Manley records—"The thought that [Sobers] might be lost as a consequence of a political gaffe was intolerable. For the great majority, the incident was forgiven and promptly forgotten."

Sobers regained his former popularity and kept the West Indies cricket captaincy until 1972; he retired from the sport two years later. He was subsequently knighted by Queen Elizabeth II in 1975 for his services to cricket, and named one of the ten National Heroes of Barbados by the Barbadian government in 1998. His controversial visit to Rhodesia has been described by cricket journalist Siddhartha Vaidyanathan as precursoring the West Indian "rebel tours" affair of the early 1980s, in which black cricketers from the Caribbean broke the apartheid sporting boycott and played in South Africa. The West Indian rebel players became wildly popular among South African cricket fans, but were punished at home with bans from all organised cricket (initially for life, but lifted in 1989), compounded by lasting social and professional ostracism. Sobers retained his stance that politics should not interfere with sport, and was reluctant to criticise the West Indians who toured South Africa. All the same, he came to regret having gone to Rhodesia because of the scandal he had provoked. "Had I known the furore my visit was to cause," he later said, "I would not have gone."

== Notes and references ==
=== Online sources ===
- Ahmed, Suhael. "Pepsi International Double Wicket Tournament, 1997–98: Rules". ESPNcricinfo.
- Ryder-Whish, Matthew (July 2000). "The best of the best?". ESPNcricinfo.
- Vaidyanathan, Siddhartha (2 August 2007). "The unforgiven". ESPNcricinfo.
- Williamson, Martin (4 February 2006). "Sobers's Rhodesian misjudgement". ESPNcricinfo.
- Williamson, Martin (13 September 2008). "The D'Oliveira Affair". ESPNcricinfo.
- Williamson, Martin (14 July 2012). "Rewind to 1970: When politics killed a tour". ESPNcricinfo.

=== Newspaper and journal articles ===
- Flanagan, Martin (12 November 2005). "Rich pitch of cricketing prose". The Age. Melbourne.
- "Ian Smith invites Gary Sobers to visit again". The Virgin Islands Daily News. Charlotte Amalie, Saint Thomas, US Virgin Islands. 17 September 1970. p. 16.
- "Rhodesian 'door open' to Sobers". The Glasgow Herald. Glasgow. 17 September 1970. p. 7.
- "Sobers happy about trip to Rhodesia". The Age. Melbourne. 17 September 1970. p. 27.
- "Sobers' apology". The Age. Melbourne. 27 October 1970. p. 36.
- "Sobers offers an apology". The Glasgow Herald. Glasgow. 27 October 1970. p. 7.

=== Bibliography ===
- Beckles, Hilary; Stoddart, Brian, eds. (February 1995). Liberation Cricket: West Indies Cricket Culture. Manchester: Manchester University Press. ISBN 978-0-7190-4315-4.
- Geldenhuys, Deon (1990). Isolated States: A Comparative Analysis. Cambridge University Press. ISBN 978-0-521-40268-2.
- Hartman, Rodney (2006). Ali: The Life of Ali Bacher. Johannesburg: Penguin South Africa. ISBN 978-0-14-302516-0.
- Lawrence, Bridgette; Scarlett, Reg (March 1987). 100 Great West Indian Test Cricketers: from Challenor to Richards. London: Hansib. ISBN 978-1870518659.
- Manley, Michael (May 1988). A History of West Indies Cricket. London: André Deutsch. ISBN 978-0-233-98259-5.
- Nauright, John; Parrish, Charles, eds. (2012). Sports Around the World: History, Culture, and Practice. Volume I. Santa Barbara, California: ABC-CLIO. ISBN 978-0-7190-4315-4.
- Odendaal, André (2003). The Story of an African Game: Black Cricketers and the Unmasking of one of Cricket's Greatest Myths, South Africa, 1850–2003. Cape Town: David Philip Publishers. ISBN 978-0-86486-638-7.
- Smith, Ian (June 1997). The Great Betrayal: The Memoirs of Ian Douglas Smith. London: John Blake Publishing. ISBN 1-85782-176-9.
