= Congress of Trade Unions and Staff Associations of Barbados =

National trade union of Barbados

CTUSAB
- Congress of Trade Unions and Staff Associations of Barbados
- Founded: August 1993
- Headquarters: No.4 Letting, Garrison, St. Michael, Bridgetown, Barbados
- Location: Barbados
- Members: 20,110 (2007)
- President: Ryan Phillips
- Key people: Dennis de Peiza (General Secretary)
- Affiliations: Public Service International

The Congress of Trade Unions and Staff Associations of Barbados is a national trade union centre.

== Origins ==
The CTUSAB has its origins in the emergence of protests against the Barbados government's acceptance of an IMF/World Bank structural adjustment programme in the early 1990s. The proposed programme included the devaluation of the Barbadian dollar, cuts to welfare, public services and public salaries, public sector job cuts, increases in taxes and privatisations. In response, an umbrella organisation called the Coalition of Trade Unions and Staff Associations was formed in September 1991 by the country's two largest unions, the Barbados Workers' Union and the National Union of Public Workers. This structure was renamed the Congress of Trade Unions and Staff Associations of Barbados in August 1993 to unify the labour movement response to the worsening economic conditions of the period. Joining with business groups and other civil society organisations, the CTUSAB negotiated a protocol with the government which lessened the impacts of the structural adjustment programme and decreased social conflict. Business leader John Goddard termed the first protocol "remarkably successful in terms of changing the mood in the country and fostering dialogue."

== Affiliates ==
Affiliated unions include: the National Union of Public Workers, Barbados Workers' Union, Barbados Secondary Teachers Union, Barbados Union of Teachers, Barbados Association of Principals of Public Secondary Schools, Police Association, Prison Officers, Fire Officers Association, Barbados Registered Nurses Association and the Sugar Industry Supervisors Association.

== Presidents ==
1995: Roy Trotman
2010: Cedric H. Murrell
2018: Edwin Oneal
2023: Abdon Dasilva
2024: Ryan Phillips

== See also ==
- List of trade unions
- List of federations of trade unions
