= NUPW =

NUPW may refer to:

- National Union of Plantation Workers of Malaysia
- National Union of Public Workers of Barbados
