= Toni Moore =

Barbadian trade unionist and politician

The Honourable Toni Moore MP
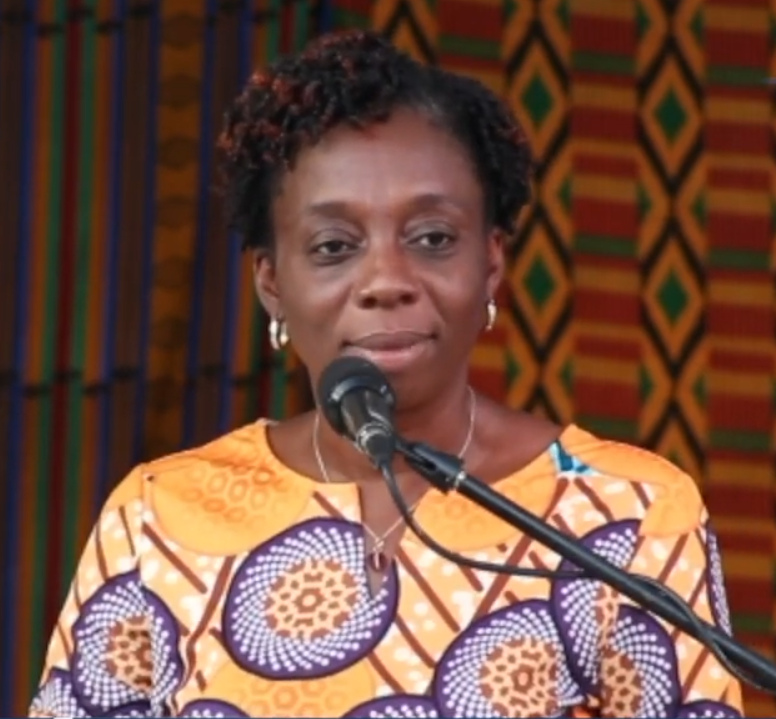
- Moore in 2021

Member of Parliament for Saint George North
- Incumbent
- Assumed office 11 November 2020
- Monarch: Elizabeth II (until 2021)
- President: Sandra Mason (from 2021)
- Governor General: Sandra Mason (until 2021)
- Prime Minister: Mia Mottley
- Preceded by: Gline Clarke

Senator of the Parliament of Barbados
- In office 4 June 2018 – 1 October 2020
- Succeeded by: Julian Hunte

General Secretary, Barbados Workers' Union
- Incumbent
- Assumed office 2014
- Preceded by: Roy Trotman

Personal details
- Party: Barbados Labour Party (from 2020)
- Other political affiliations: Independent (until 2020)

Toni Moore is a trade unionist and politician from Barbados. Moore has served as general secretary of the Barbados Workers' Union since 2014. She was appointed an independent senator in 2018 and resigned from the post in October 2020 to contest the 2020 St. George North by-election for the Barbados Labour Party. Moore won the 11 November 2020 byelection with 66.7 percent of the vote, on a 49.8 percent turnout of the constituency's 9,897 registered voters.
