= 2020 St. George North by-election =

Parliamentary by-election in Barbados in 2020

2020 St George North constituency by-election
- 11 November 2020
- Turnout: 47.97% (▼18.74pp)
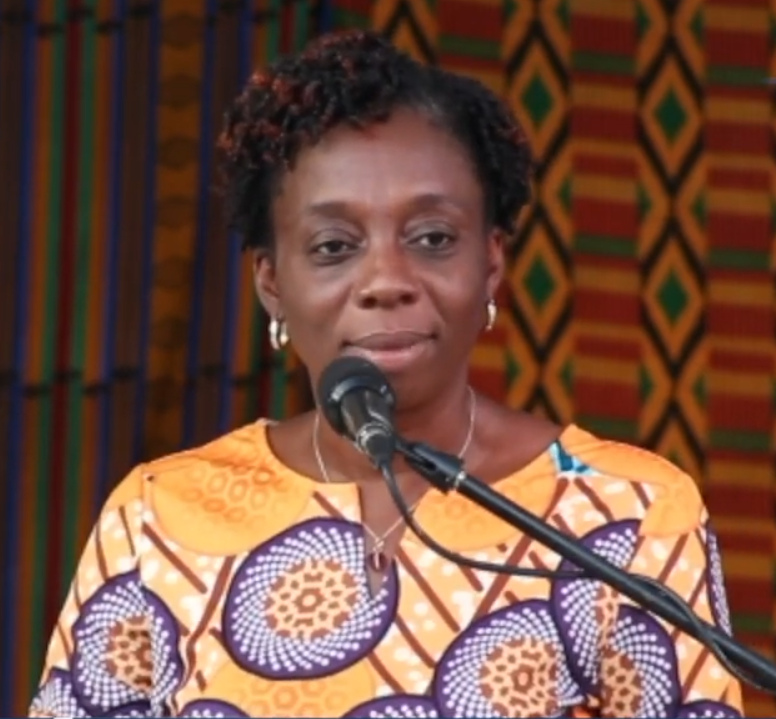

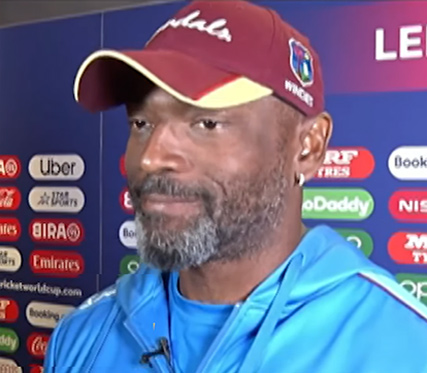
Candidate	Toni Moore	Floyd Reifer
Party	BLP	DLP
Popular vote	3,154	1,327
Percentage	66.60%	28.02%
Swing		New party
- Boundary of St George in Barbados.
MP before election
Gline Clarke
BLP
Elected MP
Toni Moore
BLP

A by-election was held in the Barbadian constituency of St George North on 11 November 2020 following the resignation of incumbent BLP Member of Parliament Gline Clarke, who had represented the constituency for the prior twenty-six years, to accept the post of Barbados High Commissioner to Canada. It was the first election to take place since Prime Minister Mia Mottley's governing Barbados Labour Party won all seats in the House of Assembly in the 2018 Barbadian general election.

== Previous election ==
General election 2018: St George North
Party	Candidate	Votes	%	±%
BLP	Gline Arley Clarke	4,779	80.8	+21.3
DLP	Jepter Ince	745	12.6	−27.9
SB	Grenville Walter Phillips II	264	4.5	
UPP	Everton Ricardo Holligan	124	2.1	
Majority		4,034	84.4	+49.3
Turnout		3,944	66.7	+1.2
Registered electors		5,912		
BLP hold		Swing	+21.37	

== Campaign ==
=== Contesting parties ===
Party	Position	Ideology	Leader (since)
Barbados Labour Party	Centre-left	Social democracy Republicanism	Mia Mottley (February 2013)
Democratic Labour Party	Centre-left	Social democracy Democratic socialism Republicanism	Verla De Peiza (August 2018)
Solutions Barbados	Centre	Manifesto	Grenville Phillips II (July 2015)
United Progressive Party	Centre-left	Labourism; Progressivism; Social democracy Third Way	Everton Holligan (March 2019)
Bajan Free Party		Political transparency	Alex Mitchell (October 2012)
People's Party for Democracy and Development	Centre-left	Social democracy Christian democracy Christian left	Joseph Atherley (June 2019)

== Result ==
Toni Moore won the election, keeping the seat in BLP hands. Shortly after the election, Grenville Phillips II, the leader of the Solutions Barbados party, announced that he was retiring from further political activity.

Turnout was over 14% lower in the district than in 2018, with less than half of eligible voters participating.

2020 St George North by-election
Party	Candidate	Votes	%	±%
BLP	Toni Moore	3,154	66.60	−14.24
DLP	Floyd Reifer	1,327	28.02	+15.42
SB	Grenville Phillips II	95	2.01	−2.46
PdP	David Walrond	80	1.69	
UPP	Ambrose Grosvenor	70	1.48	−0.62
BFP	Alex Mitchell	10	0.21	
Majority		1,827	57.93	
Total valid votes		4,736	99.75	
Turnout		4,748	47.97	−18.74
Registered electors		9,897		
BLP hold		Swing	-14.24	

== See also ==
- 2018 Barbadian general election
- List of parliamentary constituencies of Barbados
