= Garfield Sobers =

Barbadian cricketer (1936–2026)

The Right Excellent Sir Garfield Sobers AO OCC, TC
- Sobers in 2012
- Born: 28 July 1936; Bridgetown, Colony of Barbados
- Died: 17 July 2026 (aged 89); Saint Michael, Barbados
- Height: 5 ft 11 in (180 cm)
- Spouse: Prudence Kirby (m. 1969; div. 1990)
- Children: 3
- Awards: Wisden Cricketer of the Year (1964); Wisden Cricketer of the Century (2000); ICC Cricket Hall of Fame (2009)
- Cricket career

Personal information
- Full name: Garfield St Auburn Sobers
- Batting: Left-handed
- Bowling: Left-arm fast medium; Slow left-arm orthodox; Left-arm unorthodox spin
- Role: All-rounder
- Relatives: David Holford (cousin)

International information
- National side: West Indies (1954–1974)
- Test debut (cap 84): 30 March 1954 v England
- Last Test: 5 April 1974 v England
- Only ODI (cap 11): 5 September 1973 v England

Domestic team information
- Years: Team
- 1952/53–1973/74: Barbados
- 1961/62–1963/64: South Australia
- 1968–1974: Nottinghamshire

Career statistics
Competition	Test	ODI	FC	LA
Matches	93	1	383	95
Runs scored	8,032	0	28,314	2,721
Batting average	57.78	0.00	54.87	38.32
100s/50s	26/30	0/0	86/121	1/18
Top score	365*	0	365*	116*
Balls bowled	21,599	63	70,789	4,387
Wickets	235	1	1,043	109
Bowling average	34.03	31.00	27.74	21.95
5 wickets in innings	6	0	36	1
10 wickets in match	0	0	1	0
Best bowling	6/73	1/31	9/49	5/43
Catches/stumpings	109/–	1/–	407/–	41/–
- Source: Cricinfo, 13 September 2007

Sir Garfield St Auburn (or Aubrun) Sobers (28 July 1936 – 17 July 2026), also known as Gary or Garry Sobers, was a Barbadian cricketer who played for the West Indies between 1954 and 1974. A highly skilled and aggressive batsman, a versatile bowler and an excellent fielder, he is widely considered to be cricket's greatest ever all-rounder and one of the greatest cricketers of all time.

Born in Bridgetown, Barbados, Sobers made his first-class debut for the Barbados cricket team at the age of 16 in 1953, and his Test debut for the West Indies the following year. Originally playing mainly as a bowler, he was soon promoted up the batting order. Against Pakistan in 1958, Sobers scored his maiden Test century, progressing to 365 not out and setting a new record for the highest individual score in an innings. His record stood until Brian Lara scored 375 in 1994. Sobers was made captain of the West Indies in 1965, a role he held until 1972. He also captained a Rest of the World XI during their 1970 tour of England.

Overall, Sobers played 93 Tests for the West Indies, scoring 8,032 runs at an average of 57.78, and taking 235 wickets at an average of 34.03. He has the fifth-highest batting average in Test cricket among players with more than 5,000 runs. In his 383 first-class matches, he scored over 28,000 runs and took over 1,000 wickets, having spent time with South Australia and Nottinghamshire towards the end of his career. Sobers was knighted by Queen Elizabeth II in 1975 for his services to cricket. He became a dual Barbadian-Australian citizen through marriage in 1980. By an act of Parliament in 1998, Sobers was named as one of the 11 National Heroes of Barbados. In 2009, he was inducted into the ICC Cricket Hall of Fame.

== Early years ==
Garfield St Aubrun Sobers was born on 28 July 1936 to Shamont and Thelma Sobers of Walcott Avenue, Bay Land, St Michael, Bridgetown, Barbados, and was the fifth of six children. At birth, he had two extra fingers, one on each hand, which he removed himself as a boy, using catgut and a sharp knife. Sobers was only five when his father died at sea serving with the Canadian Merchant Navy, in January 1942, after his ship was torpedoed by a German U-boat.

From an early age, Sobers showed both enthusiasm and natural ability in almost any sport involving a ball, particularly cricket, football and basketball. He and his equally talented brother Gerald helped their Bay Street Boys' School team win the primary school Inter-School Cricket championship for three consecutive years. At 13, he was recruited to play for local cricket side Kent St Philip club in the Barbados Cricket League (BCL), while practising with another, the Wanderers club, located at Bay Land, in the Barbados Cricket Association (BCA). Garnet Ashby, captain of Kent St Philip, told him that this was his opportunity to play cricket with "the big boys".

Sobers gained valuable experience by bowling to Wanderers batsmen, including West Indies Test player Denis Atkinson, during net practice, and soon developed considerable skill as a left-arm spin bowler. More importantly for his career, he was noticed by Inspector Wilfred Farmer, captain of the Police team in the BCL First Division. Farmer offered him a place in the Police team for the 1951–52 season, when Sobers was still only 15. In the 1952–53 season, Sobers was invited to the Barbados trials for the colony's tour match against the Indian touring team at Kensington Oval, Bridgetown. Initially selected as 12th man, he was drafted when Frank King withdrew through injury. Sobers made his first-class debut on 31 January 1953, aged 16. Batting at number nine, he scored seven not out in his only innings, but made an immediate impression as a bowler, taking 4/50 and 3/92.

A full year passed before Sobers, now 17, made his second first-class appearance, again against a touring side. He batted at number five against Marylebone Cricket Club (MCC), scoring 46 and 27, and took two wickets in the match. His performances in these two fixtures were enough to earn selection for the West Indies, and his third first-class appearance was his Test debut.

== International cricket career ==
=== 1954–1957: Early Test career ===
Sobers had progressed quickly and made his Test debut in March 1954, aged 17, against England at Sabina Park in Kingston, Jamaica, for the fifth and final Test, after Alf Valentine had fallen ill. Sobers was selected as a bowler, despite only mediocre performances against England for Barbados. He made a good impression by taking 4/75 in England's first innings, including a wicket in his opening over. Sobers also scored 14 not out and 26 batting at number nine; however, England won the match by nine wickets.

Australia toured the West Indies in 1954–55, and their all-rounder Keith Miller thought that Sobers would become a better batsman than bowler despite batting in the lower order. Sobers was not selected for the First Test, which the West Indies lost by nine wickets. However, he regained his place for the Second Test in Port of Spain, Trinidad and Tobago. The match was a high-scoring draw, with Sobers scoring 47 and eight not out. He was barely used with the ball, bowling three overs for ten runs, as Australia amassed a first-innings total of over 600. Sobers was given a further opportunity in the next Test in Georgetown, Guyana (British Guiana at the time) in South America. Despite scoring only 12 and 11 with the bat, he took three wickets in the Australians' first innings. Nevertheless, Australia won by eight wickets. West Indian captain and opening batsman Jeff Stollmeyer twisted his ankle after treading on a ball ahead of the Fourth Test in Barbados, "triggering huge debate about who should open." Eventually, Sobers was chosen to open the innings after Australia had amassed another total of over 600. Sobers had a suspicion he might be asked to do the job. "I couldn't see them sending in anyone else—I was a bowler with a little ability as a batsman and they wanted someone to help see off the shine and protect the three Ws." Sobers struck his first three deliveries for boundaries, all from the bowling of Miller. In the fast bowler's second over, Sobers hit him for another three fours. He was eventually dismissed for 43 out of a first-wicket partnership of 52 with John Holt. The match was drawn, and Sobers took one wicket in the Australians' only innings, before scoring 11 in the West Indies second innings. The home team were again defeated in the fifth and final Test in Jamaica. Sobers performed with the bat, however, scoring 35 not out and 64.

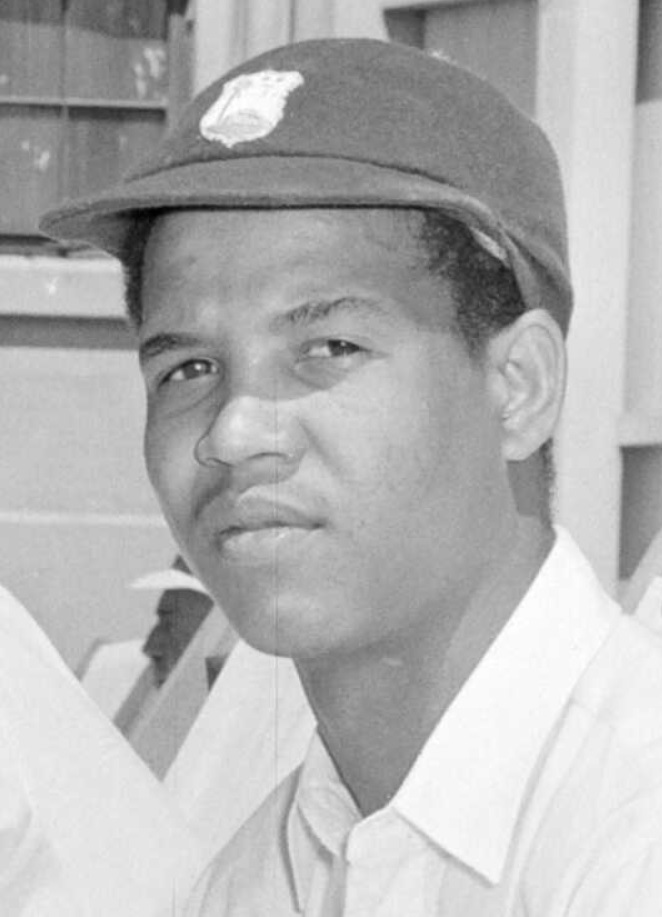
Sobers in 1956

Sobers went on his first overseas tour in the early months of 1956 when, aged 19, he was part of the West Indian tour of New Zealand. The series was not successful personally for Sobers, who struggled on the foreign batting wickets. West Indies pitches had little or no grass, while in New Zealand the pitches were green. "I took one look and asked myself how I could possibly bat on that? How could I make runs? I was out before I even walked to the crease," Sobers later wrote. Playing in all four Tests, he totalled 81 runs and two wickets. As a batsman, Sobers needed time to develop at Test level and, in nine Tests as a teenager, he scored only one half century, and averaged 29.33 with the bat.

Sobers was sent home from New Zealand early to play an unofficial Test match against an England team that included feared fast-bowler Frank Tyson. After struggling to cope with Tyson's pace, Sobers managed to score a half-century, raising hope that he would be selected for the upcoming tour to England, something he considered unlikely after his lack of form. In the first trial match to help select the squad for the upcoming tour, Sobers scored a century in Trinidad. The matches also saw Sobers get his first look at West Indian cricket politics. Wes Hall and Frank Mason were competing for a single place in the touring party, and Sobers and Everton Weekes decided they "would take on Mason and knock him out of the firing line to try and get our fellow Bajan (countryman) Wes in the team." The pair attacked Mason, while they defended Hall in a tactic that paid off with Hall selected, despite Sobers believing Mason was the better bowler at the time.

Sobers toured England for their summer in 1957. He played his first match against the Jim Swanton XI in April, and was surprised about how cold the conditions were, often causing him to wear two or three jumpers. His performances with the bat throughout the five Test series were classed as mediocre, scoring 320 runs at 32, with three half centuries. On the bowling front, Sobers struggled, taking five wickets at 71. It was in the final Test at The Oval that Sobers gained the attention of critics with defiant batting amid a disappointing team performance. The condition of the pitch was subject to criticism and described by Wisden Cricketers' Almanack as "a strange sight". After England had scored 412, the West Indies were easily dismissed for 89 and 86 by the Surrey spinners Jim Laker and Tony Lock, who were playing on their home ground. Batting at number 3, Sobers made 39 and 42, while none of his colleagues passed 30 in either innings. In its summary of the tour, Wisden said: "(of the newcomers) Collie Smith, Sobers, Rohan Kanhai and Roy Gilchrist were particularly impressive"; adding that "to Sobers, a tall left-handed all-rounder, fell the distinction of hitting the highest score of the tour: 219 not out against Nottinghamshire at Trent Bridge. Sobers undoubtedly was a very fine stroke-player who should go far".

=== 1958–1964: 365 not out ===
At this stage of his career, Sobers had frustrated his admirers by failing to convert good starts into high scores. He had reached double figures in 18 of his 22 Test innings, although his highest score was still only 66. But, in the three years following the 1957 tour, he fulfilled his promise. In his next 24 Tests, he scored 2,250 runs at the exceptionally high average of 93.75. In 1958, he scored his maiden Test century against Pakistan in Kingston and expanded it to an unbeaten 365, breaking the world record Test score of 364 set by England's Len Hutton in 1938. Sobers batted for 614 minutes and scored 38 fours but, unusually in such a large total, no sixes. At 21 years and 216 days, he is the youngest player to break the individual scoring record in Tests, and remains the youngest triple-centurion. Sir Garfield Sobers set the world records for the highest maiden test ton (365*) as well as becoming the first batsman in test history to convert his maiden test ton into a triple ton. He made 824 runs with three centuries in the five Tests against Pakistan, and followed this with 557 runs and three more centuries on the West Indies tour of India in 1958–59. Sobers underwent trauma following the death of Collie Smith in September 1959, but he continued to play cricket successfully. In the home Test series against England in 1959–60, he scored three centuries in five matches, totalling 709 runs.

Largely inspired by new West Indies captain Sir Frank Worrell, who was a close personal friend, Sobers had an outstanding 1960–61 series in Australia. He scored a celebrated 132 on the first day of the First Test at Brisbane Cricket Ground, the match which resulted in the first Tied Test. Wisden said "some observers considered it the best hundred they had ever seen". Sobers scored 430 runs in the series, which Australia won 2–1, with two centuries; his fielding was outstanding and he took 12 catches. He felt he had "had a good series, starting badly but then coming on" and a very positive outcome for him was to receive an invitation from Don Bradman to play for South Australia in 1961–62.

Sobers took 15 wickets in the 1960–61 series, including a best analysis of 5/120, at an average of 39.20, and his bowling allowed Worrell to play an extra batsman in the final three Tests, thus using Sobers for the first time as a designated all-rounder, a role in which he became the dominant player in world cricket over the next decade, being awarded the Wisden Leading Cricketer in the World title (retrospectively) eight times in 13 years. Sobers was never a prolific wicket-taker in Test cricket, and his average of three wickets per game in this series typified his whole career. Overall, he took 235 wickets in his 93 Tests at an average of 34.03 and was more effective when operating as a pace bowler. His best performance was 6/73 and, although he achieved five wickets in an innings six times, he never took ten in a match.

His success continued in the next two series at home to India in 1961–62 and away to England in 1963. He was elected Wisden Cricketer of the Year in 1964, and then succeeded Worrell, who had retired, as West Indies captain for the 1964–65 home series against Australia.

=== 1965–1974: West Indies captaincy ===
Sobers enjoyed immediate success as West Indies captain when his team defeated Australia by 179 runs in the First Test at Sabina Park. West Indies went on to win the series 2–1 and so claim the new Frank Worrell Trophy. This was the first time West Indies had beaten Australia in a Test series.

Sobers enjoyed spectacular success in England in 1966 and was widely acclaimed as "King Cricket". In the five Tests he scored 722 runs at an average of 103.14 with three centuries, and had 20 wickets at 27.25, as well as taking 10 catches. West Indies won the series 3–1, with one match drawn. His status was celebrated at that time by the Trinidadian calypso artist Mighty Sparrow, with his song "Sir Garfield Sobers".

In 1966–67, Sobers captained the West Indies team to India in 1966–67 and they won the series 2–0 with one match drawn.

He lost a series for the first time in 1967–68 when West Indies were surprisingly beaten at home by England. Four matches were drawn and England won the Fourth Test at Queen's Park Oval following a controversial declaration by Sobers which enabled England to score the necessary 215–3 to win at just four runs an over.

In 1968–69, Sobers captained the West Indian cricket team in Australia in 1968-69 but they lost the series 3–1 and then drew a three-Test series in New Zealand 1–1.

In 1969, West Indies lost 2–0 in England with one match drawn.

Sobers captained West Indies for the five-Test home series versus India in 1970–71. India won the series 1–0 with four matches drawn. A year later, Sobers led West Indies in five home Tests against New Zealand and all five were drawn.

Sobers was succeeded as West Indies captain by Rohan Kanhai for the 1972–73 home series against Australia. Sobers did not play in that series but returned to play under Kanhai in England in 1973. He played his last Test in March 1974 at Queen's Park Oval, Port of Spain, against England.

=== Rest of the World XI ===
When South Africa were banned from international cricket because of the country's apartheid policy, South Africa's two lucrative tours to England in 1970 and to Australia in 1971–72 were cancelled. The cricket authorities responded by forming a Rest of the World team to play two unofficial Test series instead, and these teams included some leading South African players. Sobers was invited to captain the Rest of the World XI in England and a World XI in Australia.

In 1970, captaining the Rest of the World XI against England, he took 6/21 on the opening day of the First unofficial Test at Lord's with pace bowling, the ball swinging and seaming at high speed. He then scored "a magnificent" 183 and helped bowl out England in the second innings using his left arm wrist spin. In the Fourth Test at Headingley, Sobers scored 114 and 59 as his team won by two wickets. Following the Rest of the World series, he outraged many in the West Indies by playing in a friendly double-wicket tournament in Rhodesia in September 1970.

In January 1972, in the third unofficial Test between Australia and the World XI at the Melbourne Cricket Ground, Sobers played an innings of 254 which was described by Don Bradman as "probably the greatest exhibition of batting ever seen in Australia". Australian captain Ian Chappell also rates the innings as the best innings he ever saw.

He reached his century in 129 balls and after a rest day, reached 254 in 326 balls. It was "one of the most magnificent innings seen on the Melbourne Cricket Ground" and his "superb display of forceful cricket" lasted 376 minutes and included two sixes and 33 fours. Sobers wrote in his autobiography that these two unofficial series should be given full Test status due to the quality of the players involved.

== League cricket in England ==
Sobers spent several seasons in English league cricket. Having completed his first tour of England with West Indies in 1957, he followed the advice of his mentor Frank Worrell and became the professional at Radcliffe Cricket Club in the Central Lancashire League, staying for five seasons from 1958 to 1962. This experience enabled him to hone his skills in varying conditions and Sobers says that playing in the league furthered his cricket education. He enjoyed considerable success at Radcliffe. In 1961, he achieved a rare "double" by scoring 1008 runs and taking 144 wickets, his performances being instrumental in Radcliffe winning both the league's championship title and its supplementary Wood Cup competition.

While he was engaged at Radcliffe, Sobers underwent emotional trauma after a road accident in September 1959 on the A34 near Stoke-on-Trent which resulted in Collie Smith's death. Sobers was driving a car in which Smith and another West Indian Test player Tom Dewdney were passengers. Smith's back was broken by the collision and he died three days later. Sobers could not recall much about the crash and was fined £10 for driving without due care and attention. He "began drinking more" and there were concerns, expressed by himself and others, that the experience might affect his cricket career. He got over the trauma by deciding that he would be letting his country down if he "disappeared into the mists of an alcoholic haze" and he resolved to play not just for Garfield Sobers but for Collie Smith as well, thus setting himself the task of playing for two men. He recovered well and, after an outstanding home Test series against England in 1959–60, he returned to Radcliffe where he continued as club professional for the next three seasons.

Sobers gives an insight into the life of the club professional in his autobiography. He was paid £500 a season by Radcliffe (equivalent to £10,019 in 2025). That was a reasonable wage but he relied on matchday collections to augment it and a good performance would boost the collection. He sometimes received as much as £50 in a collection and "that represented a massive bonus". Radcliffe placed no restrictions on him and, when they had no game, he could play as a guest professional in other leagues throughout Lancashire and Yorkshire. He particularly liked playing in Yorkshire when he could because they would pay him £25 per appearance with a collection on top if he did well.

After touring England with West Indies in 1963, he moved to the North Staffordshire and South Cheshire League in 1964 to play for Norton Cricket Club, who duly won the league title. Sobers made 549 runs in 18 innings at 49.90, finishing second in the league averages behind only his amateur brother Gerald, also playing for Norton, who averaged 50.12. Gary Sobers did even better with the ball, his 97 wickets at 8.38 heading the league averages. 1965 saw a repeat performance with Norton again winning the league and, though Sobers only averaged 25.38 with the bat, he again topped the league bowling averages with 76 wickets at 8.03. Norton lost the league title in 1966 while Sobers was touring England with West Indies but regained it in 1967 when he returned. He was fourth in the 1967 league batting averages with 41.83 and third in the bowling with 95 wickets at 9.37 (the two bowlers with better averages took only 22 and 24 wickets).

== Sheffield Shield with South Australia ==
In the 1961–62 Australian season which followed the 1960–61 West Indies tour, Sobers and his West Indian colleagues Wes Hall and Rohan Kanhai returned to Australia to take part in the Sheffield Shield. Sobers played for South Australia and had an enormous impact on attendances, causing an 89% increase with gate receipts rising "by two and a half times". He topped both the batting and bowling averages at South Australia, his best performance being against champions New South Wales at the Adelaide Oval when he scored 251 and took 3/51 and 6/72.

Sobers was even more outstanding in 1963–64 when, largely due to his efforts, South Australia won the Sheffield Shield. Sobers was the season's leading runscorer with 973 at 74.84 and the leading wicket taker with 47 at 28.27.

He spent three seasons with South Australia and in two he achieved the rare double of 1000 runs and 50 wickets.

== Shell Shield with Barbados ==
Sobers played intermittently for Barbados throughout his first-class career. He made his first appearance in the inaugural season of the new Shell Shield competition in February 1966. His last appearance for Barbados came in the 1973–74 Shell Shield match against Jamaica, at Kensington Oval.

== County Championship with Nottinghamshire ==
At the end of the 1967 English cricket season, it was agreed that each county club could immediately sign a non-English player for the 1968 season. Seven clubs approached Sobers and, on 14 December 1967, Nottinghamshire announced that he had signed for them and had been appointed club captain. Sobers stated that, although he had enjoyed his time in league cricket, he had a definite preference for the first-class game and he looked forward to restoring Nottinghamshire's fortunes. Though details were undisclosed, Wisden 1968 speculated that his contract would run for three years and be worth £7000 a year (a very high income at the time), including an apartment and a car.

=== Six sixes in an over ===
On 31 August 1968, Sobers became the first batsman ever to hit six sixes in a single over of six consecutive balls in first-class cricket. Playing as captain of Nottinghamshire against Glamorgan at St Helen's in Swansea, Sobers hit the first four balls cleanly out of the ground but was caught on his fifth attempt by Roger Davis on the boundary at long-off. However, while doing so, Davis fell on his back and landed on the line. Umpire Eddie Phillipson ruled that Davis had carried the ball over the boundary and signalled six. Sobers then smashed the next ball—the sixth ball of the over—clean over the East Terrace of the St. Helen's Cricket Ground. As commentator Wilf Wooller put it: "And he's done it! He's done it! And my goodness, it's gone ... way down to Swansea!" The unfortunate bowler was Malcolm Nash. This tally of 36 runs in an over broke a 57-year-old record of 34 runs, held by Ted Alletson. The ball was collected from a garden by 11-year-old Richard Lewis; he later gave the ball to Sobers. In 1984–85, Indian batsman Ravi Shastri equalled the record by scoring six sixes in an over while playing for Bombay versus Baroda.

== Style and technique ==
Sobers was left-handed as both batsman and bowler. His versatility enabled him to bowl all varieties of left-arm bowling from spin to fast-medium. As a fielder he was usually stationed close to the wicket but he was also a very capable outfielder.

In a 1988 interview with Norman May, the great Australian batsman and cricket administrator Sir Donald Bradman described Sobers as the best all-rounder he ever saw, and gave this assessment of his style and technique:

I've got no hesitation at all in saying that Gary Sobers is the greatest allround cricketer I ever saw... Sobers made over 8000 runs for the West Indies in test matches at the splendid average of 57.7, and only Weekes and Headley have beaten that average. He also took 235 wickets. Although his bowling average of 34 was high, it is understandable because he bowled fast with the new ball, left hand googly or first finger spin according to what the situation demanded, and this took away some of the accuracy that the less versatile bowlers developed. Without a doubt he was the best batsman in the world against fast bowling, on top of that he was a superb fielder in any position.

— Sir Donald Bradman, 1988

Richie Benaud described Sobers as "the greatest all-round cricketer the world has seen". Benaud wrote, "Sobers was a brilliant batsman, splendid fielder, particularly close to the wicket, and a bowler of extraordinary skill, whether bowling with the new ball, providing orthodox left-arm spin or over-the-wrist spin".

Fred Trueman enjoyed a great rivalry with Sobers and later described him as a "sublime left-hand batsman" who was "one of the greatest cricketers ever to have graced the game, certainly the greatest all-rounder". Trueman went on to say that Sobers as a batsman "has a great cricketing brain and his thought processes are lightning quick".

C. L. R. James, when describing the batsmanship of Wilton St Hill, commented upon St Hill's ability to judge the ball early in its flight and so quickly decide which stroke to play. In James's view, only Sir Don Bradman and Sobers were comparable with St Hill in having this capability of "seeing" the ball. Wisden 1969 described the "lightning footwork" of Sobers as he got into position for his stroke. Commenting upon Sobers's six sixes in an over against his team in 1968, Glamorgan captain Tony Lewis said: "It was not sheer slogging through strength, but scientific hitting with every movement working in harmony."

As a bowler, Sobers began as an orthodox left arm spinner (SLA) and later developed the ability to bowl left arm wrist spin and googlies. Sobers could also operate as a seamer, sometimes using medium pace, but he was much more effective when he bowled fast. With the new ball, he could make the delivery curve late in flight at high speed; his action being a loose, springy run followed by a "whiplash" delivery.

Though he mostly fielded close to the wicket, Sobers was an exceptional outfielder who was seen on one occasion, when he had fielded the ball on the boundary, to "bend his hand back almost parallel with his arm before flipping the ball a full seventy yards to the wicketkeeper".

Following his success as captain of West Indies on the 1966 tour of England, the 1967 edition of Wisden Cricketers' Almanack declared that for Sobers "(the 1966 Tests) were one triumph after another with bat and ball, as well as in the field as a master tactician and fantastic catcher close to the bat". Sobers's exploits in 1966 earned him the media-bestowed sobriquet of "King Cricket", which soon afterwards became the title of a book about him.

== Football career ==
Sobers was a natural athlete and played football at a competitive level in Barbados, primarily as a left-back (defender). His physical strength, tactical awareness, and athleticism made him a formidable player.

== Personal life and death ==
Sobers was briefly engaged to Indian actress Anju Mahendru after he met her on the 1966–67 tour of India. He married Prudence "Pru" Kirby, an Australian, in September 1969. They had two sons and an adopted daughter. The marriage ended in divorce in 1990 after the couple separated in 1984; however, Sobers acquired dual Australian citizenship through marriage in 1980.

He said that his family was a multi-sporting family who were all good at football, basketball, table tennis and tennis. His own favourite sport was golf and he was an enthusiastic gambler. He was the author of a children's novel about cricket, Bonaventure and the Flashing Blade (1967), in which computer analysis helps a university cricket team become unbeatable.

In 2021, Sobers expressed his opposition to the constitutional change made by the government of Barbados to become a republic and abolish the monarchy of Barbados.

Sobers died on 17 July 2026, aged 89. Following his death, the Prime Minister of Barbados, Mia Mottley, delivered a eulogy and declared two national days of mourning.

The funeral was attended by cricket legends including Brian Lara and Sir Clive Lloyd, along with Barbadian singer Rihanna.

=== Tributes ===
Following his death, the BBC noted that Sobers was "regarded as one of the greatest cricketers of all time". Bloomberg News called Sobers "one of the finest cricketers ever to play the game". In its obituary of Sobers, the Associated Press said that Sobers's world-record test innings of 365 not out as a 21-year-old "set him on the path to becoming arguably the sport's greatest allrounder".

== Honours and legacy ==
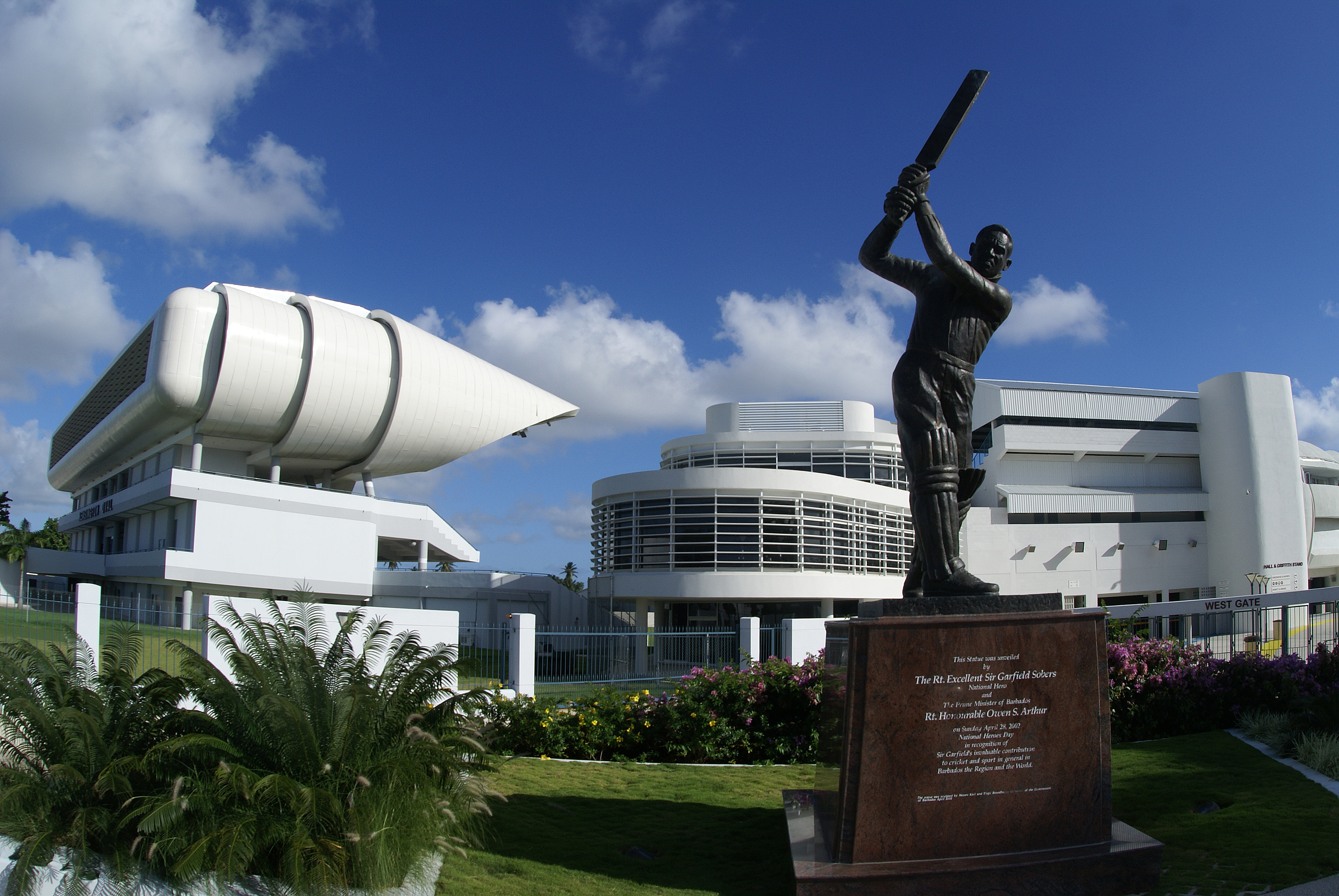
The statue of Sobers outside Kensington Oval, Bridgetown, Barbados

In the 1975 New Year Honours, Queen Elizabeth II appointed Sobers a Knight Bachelor for his services to cricket. The award appeared in the British Diplomatic and Overseas section of the list, rather than on the nomination of the Government of Barbados, which had ceased submitting recommendations for British honours. Papers released by The National Archives in 2005 show that this caused some unease within the Foreign and Commonwealth Office. However, as Barbados had not yet introduced its own honours system, the Prime Minister of Barbados welcomed the news that Sobers would receive an honour. A 1974 article in The New York Times described Sobers as "the world's top cricketer...who dominated the sport".

The knighthood had originally been intended for the 1975 Queen's Birthday Honours, but a royal visit to Barbados was planned for February 1975. The award was therefore brought forward to the New Year list so that Sobers could be knighted by the Queen in person during the visit. The short interval between the decision and its announcement meant that the Governor-General of Barbados was not informed before the news became public, which caused some hurt feelings between London and Bridgetown.

Sobers was the subject of the biographical television show This Is Your Life in 1975. Following the programme's usual format, he was surprised by host Eamonn Andrews while celebrating his recent knighthood at the Barbadian High Commission in London.

He was made a National Hero of Barbados by the Cabinet of Barbados in 1998 and is thus accorded the honorary prefix "The Right Excellent". He is one of only 11 people to have received this honour, and one of three who were recognised during their lifetime, the other two being Sir Frank Walcott and Rihanna.

Sobers coached internationally, including a one-time stint with Sri Lanka. In 2003, he was appointed an Officer of the Order of Australia; he had played many first-class matches for South Australia.

== Cricket awards ==
Among the awards that Sobers won during his playing career were:

- Wisden Cricketer of the Year: 1964
- The Cricket Society Wetherall Award for the Leading All-rounder in English First-Class Cricket: 1970
- Walter Lawrence Trophy winner: 1974
- One of the Wisden Cricketers of the Century: 2000

In 2000, Sobers was named by a 100-member panel of experts as one of the five Wisden Cricketers of the Century. He received 90 votes out of a possible 100. The other four cricketers selected for the honour were Don Bradman (100 votes), Jack Hobbs (30), Shane Warne (27) and Viv Richards (25).

In 2004, the International Cricket Council (ICC) inaugurated the Sir Garfield Sobers Trophy which is awarded annually to the player selected by ICC as its Player of the Year. The recommendation to name the award after Sobers was made by a panel consisting of Richie Benaud, Sunil Gavaskar and Michael Holding, who were asked by the ICC "to select an individual with whom to honour cricket's ultimate individual award".

In 2007 Wisden retrospectively selected the Leading Cricketer in the World for every year dating back to 1900 (except 1915–18 and 1940–45), Sobers being selected for eight years (1958, 1960, 1962, 1964–66, 1968 and 1970). Only Sobers and Bradman (10) received the accolade more than three times.

To mark 150 years of the Cricketers' Almanack, Wisden named him in an all-time Test World XI.

== Cited sources ==
- Benaud, Richie (2005). My Spin on Cricket. Hodder and Stoughton. ISBN 0-340-83393-9.
- Frith, David (1975). The Fast Men. TransWorld Publishing. ISBN 0-552-10435-3.
- Harte, Chris (1993). A History of Australian Cricket. Andre Deutsch. ISBN 0-233-98825-4.
- James, C. L. R. (2005) [1963]. Beyond A Boundary. London: Hutchinson. ISBN 978-02-24074-27-8.
- Major, John (2007). More Than a Game. HarperCollins. ISBN 978-0-00-718364-7.
- Sobers, Garfield (2003). Garry Sobers: My Autobiography. Headline. ISBN 0-7553-1007-1.
- Trueman, Fred (2004). As It Was. Macmillan. ISBN 0-330-42705-9.
- Wright, Graeme (2005). Wisden at Lord's. John Wisden & Co. Ltd. ISBN 0-947766-93-6.
- Wright, Graeme (2004). A Wisden Collection. Bloomsbury. ISBN 0-7475-7435-9.
- Wisden (1964). Wisden Cricketers' Almanack. London: John Wisden & Co. Ltd.

Sporting positions
Preceded by Frank Worrell	West Indies Test cricket captains 1964–65 to 1971–72	Succeeded by Rohan Kanhai
Preceded by Norman Hill	Nottinghamshire County cricket captain 1968–1971	Succeeded by Brian Bolus
Preceded by Brian Bolus	Nottinghamshire County cricket captain 1973	Succeeded by Jack Bond
Records
Preceded by Len Hutton	World Record – Highest individual score in Test cricket 365 not out vs Pakistan at Kingston 1957–58	Succeeded by Brian Lara
