= Alan Peach =

English cricketer

Herbert Alan Peach
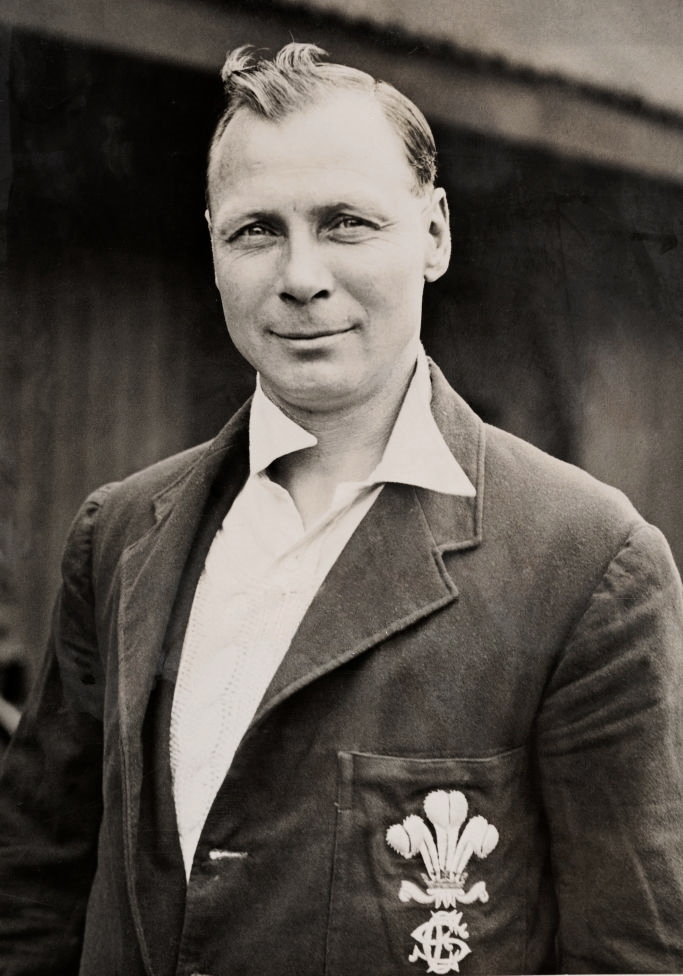
- Alan Peach in 1927

Personal information
- Born: 6 October 1890; Maidstone, Kent, England
- Died: 8 October 1961 (aged 70); North End, Newbury, Berkshire, England
- Batting: Right-handed
- Bowling: Right-arm medium

Career statistics
Competition	First-class
Matches	338
Runs scored	8,940
Batting average	23.71
100s/50s	4/49
Top score	200*
Balls bowled	54,883
Wickets	795
Bowling average	26.58
5 wickets in innings	30
10 wickets in match	1
Best bowling	8/60
Catches/stumpings	182/–
- Source: , 1 September 2022

Herbert Alan Peach (6 October 1890 – 8 October 1961) was an English cricketer who played for Surrey. He was an all-rounder: a right-handed batsman and a right-arm medium pace bowler.

Alan Peach was born in Maidstone, Kent. World War I delayed his first-class debut until 1919, when he was already 28, but in a career that extended until 1931 he still managed to take 795 wickets at 26.58 and score 8,940 runs at 23.71. The highest of his four hundreds was 200 not out, made against Northamptonshire at Northampton in 1920, when he shared in a stand of 171 in forty-two minutes with Percy Fender. A notably hard striker of the ball, he struck deliveries from William Bates of Glamorgan and Jack Newman of Hampshire out of The Oval in 1924. During the same season, he dismissed four Sussex batsmen with consecutive balls, also at The Oval, finishing with eight wickets for 60, his best innings analysis.

He made six appearances for the Players against the Gentlemen between 1923 and 1928. According to David Lemmon "he launched himself at the game with a zest, and the crowd loved him for it".

He was Surrey coach from 1935 to 1939 and discovered Alec and Eric Bedser. He died at North End, Newbury, Hampshire.

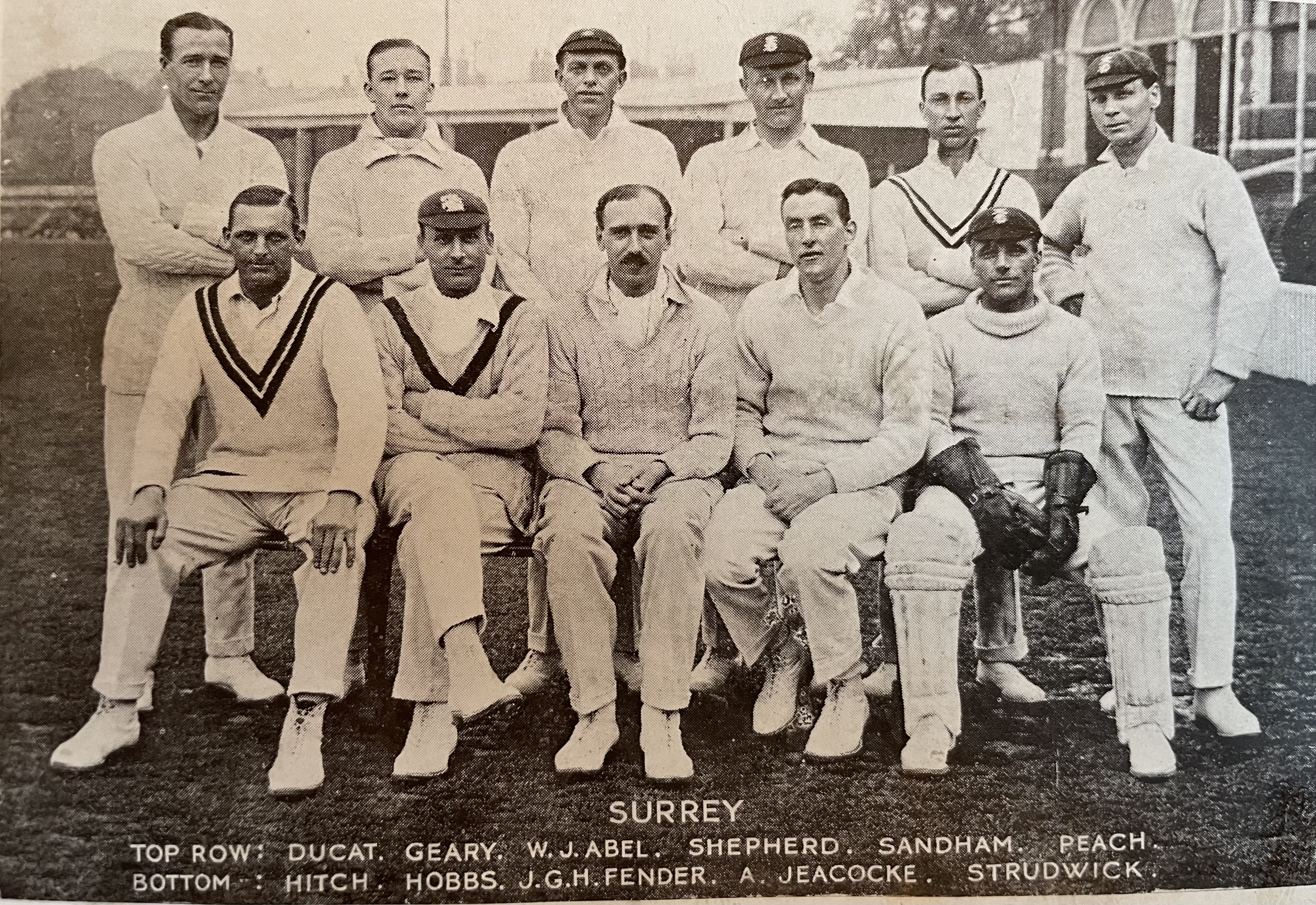
Surrey Cricket Team c1922
