= George De Peana =

Guyanese long-distance runner (1936–2021)

Personal information
- Nationality: Guyanese
- Born: 5 July 1936 Georgetown, Guyana
- Died: 26 July 2021 (aged 85)

Sport
- Country: British Guiana
- Sport: Middle-distance running

George De Peana (5 July 1936 – 26 July 2021) was a Guyanese Olympic long-distance runner and trade union leader.

De Peana represented his country in the men's 5000 meters at the 1960 Summer Olympics. His time was 15:54.2. De Peana finished fourth in the 1959 Pan American Games 10000 metres and fifth in the 1959 Pan American Games 5000 metres. In 1957, he jointly won the Guyanese Sportsman of the Year award.

After his sporting career, De Peana moved into trade unionism, becoming secretary of the Clerical and Commercial Workers' Union, then secretary of the Guyana Trades Union Congress, and from 1998 until 2007 was secretary of the Caribbean Congress of Labour.

Trade union offices
Preceded by Kertist Augustus	General Secretary of the Caribbean Congress of Labour; 1998–2007	Succeeded by Lincoln Lewis
