= Alec Bedser =

English cricketer (1918–2010)

Sir Alec Bedser
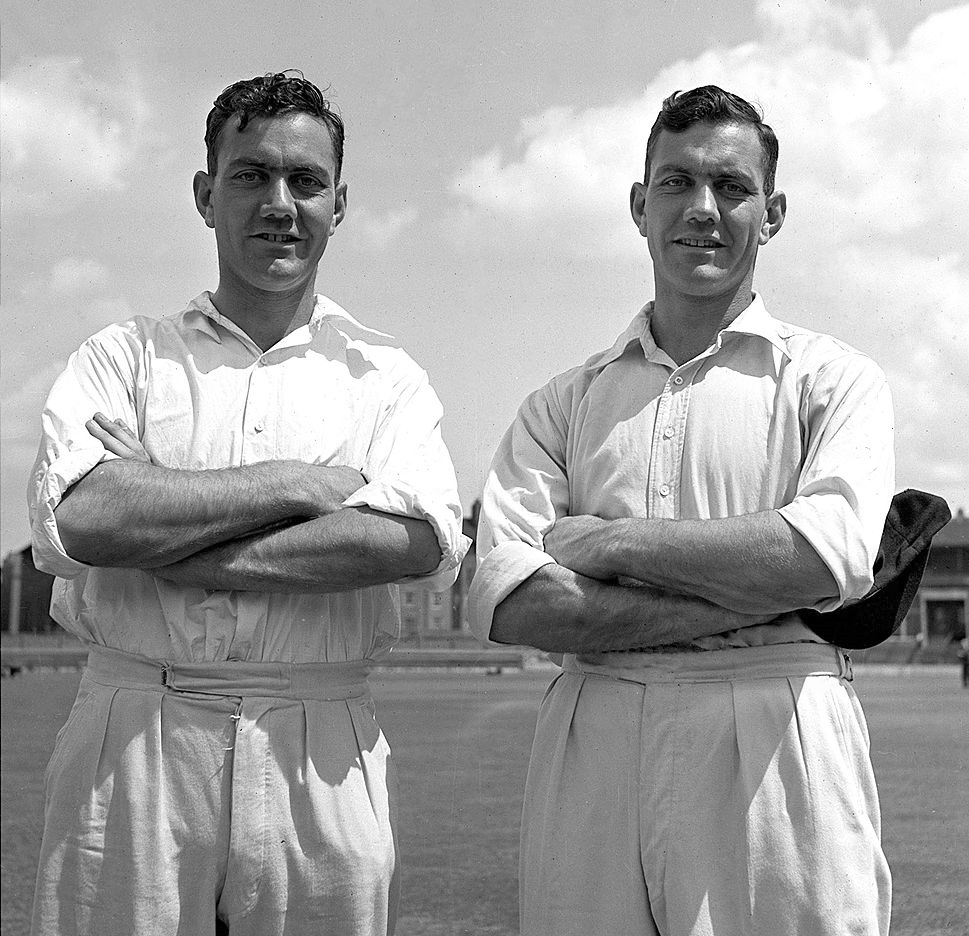
- Bedser (right) with his twin brother Eric in 1946

Personal information
- Full name: Alec Victor Bedser
- Born: 4 July 1918; Reading, Berkshire, England
- Died: 4 April 2010 (aged 91); Woking, Surrey, England
- Height: 6 ft 0 in (1.83 m)
- Batting: Right-handed
- Bowling: Right arm medium-fast
- Relatives: Eric Bedser (twin brother)

International information
- National side: England
- Test debut (cap 311): 22 June 1946 v India
- Last Test: 12 July 1955 v South Africa

Domestic team information
- Years: Team
- 1939–1960: Surrey

Career statistics
| Competition | Tests | First-class |
|---|---|---|
| Matches | 51 | 485 |
| Runs scored | 714 | 5,735 |
| Batting average | 12.75 | 14.51 |
| 100s/50s | 0/1 | 1/13 |
| Top score | 79 | 126 |
| Balls bowled | 15,918 | 106,062 |
| Wickets | 236 | 1,924 |
| Bowling average | 24.89 | 20.41 |
| 5 wickets in innings | 15 | 96 |
| 10 wickets in match | 5 | 16 |
| Best bowling | 7/44 | 8/18 |
| Catches/stumpings | 26/– | 289/– |
- Source: CricketArchive, 7 January 2009

Sir Alec Victor Bedser CBE (4 July 1918 – 4 April 2010) was an English professional cricketer, primarily a medium-fast bowler. He is widely regarded as one of the best English cricketers of the 20th century.

Bedser played first-class cricket for Surrey from 1939 to 1960 alongside his identical twin brother Eric. He took 1924 first-class wickets in 485 matches. He played Test cricket for England from 1946 to 1955, taking 236 wickets in 51 Test matches. He passed Clarrie Grimmett's world record for Test wickets in 1953. He held the record until his final tally was passed by Brian Statham in 1963.

After retirement as an active cricketer, Bedser became the chairman of selectors for the English national cricket team, and was the president of Surrey County Cricket Club. He was knighted in the 1997 New Year Honours.

== Early life and career ==
Bedser was born in Reading, Berkshire, ten minutes after his identical twin brother Eric (1918–2006). His father was a bricklayer, but had been stationed in Reading with the Royal Air Force during the First World War. The brothers remained inseparable through their lives: they often dressed identically, and shared a bank account; neither married.

The family moved to Horsell, Surrey, where, at the age of seven, the brothers played their first organised cricket. The family moved to Knaphill and then to a house they helped their father to build in Woking. They were educated at Maybury Junior School and then Monument Hill Central School in Woking. Over the next decade, the twin brothers played cricket together for Monument Hill School and Woking Cricket Club. They also both played football for Monument Hill School, both as full backs.

After leaving school, Eric and Alec became clerks at the same firm of solicitors in Lincoln's Inn Fields. They were spotted practising in the nets for Woking Cricket Club by Surrey coach Alan Peach, and he recruited them to the staff at the Oval in 1938. Initially, they were both medium-fast bowlers, but (after Alec won a toss of coin) Eric became an off spinner instead. They made their first-class débuts for Surrey against Oxford University in June 1939.

== Second World War ==
Their cricket careers were soon interrupted by the outbreak of the Second World War. They both joined the RAF police, and were sent to France with the British Expeditionary Force. They both narrowly escaped being shot before being evacuated from Dunkirk, and later served in North Africa, Italy and Austria. They were demobilised in 1946.

== Playing career ==
Alec Bedser founded England's eventual success. He toiled for hours without complaint, and never once looked annoyed at the missing of a catch, or at a rejected l.b.w. appeal. A great bowler, and an example to all who aspire to cricketing fame. The schoolboys who cheered him, and the elderly folk who applauded politely, all realised one thing. In Alec Bedser England had the best bowler Australia had seen for years, and friend and foe alike admitted the fact.

— John Kay

Alec Bedser's performances during war-time cricket matches were impressive: in games for the RAF he took 6 wickets for 27 runs (including a hat-trick) against the West Indies and 9 for 36 (featuring another hat-trick) against a Metropolitan Police team.

In his first full season for Surrey, in 1946, he passed 100 wickets before July and established himself as a bowler in the England Test team. In each of his first two Tests, against the visiting Indians, he took eleven wickets: 11 for 139 in his début at Lord's, including 7 in the first innings, and 11 for 96 in the next game at Old Trafford, Manchester. His amazing season resulted in his nomination as a Wisden Cricketer of the Year for 1947. He was selected for the 1946–47 Ashes series in Australia and for most of the next decade "carried England's bowling attack".

In Australia he was overbowled and exhausted and found that his natural in-swingers were liked by Australian leg-side batsmen like Sid Barnes. To counter this he gripped the ball across the seam like a spinner and the result was an in-swinging leg-break which would be known as Bedser's "Special Ball". Don Bradman wrote "the ball with which Alec Bedser bowled me in the Adelaide Test Match was, I think, the finest ever to take my wicket. It must have come three-quarters of the way straight on my off-stump, then suddenly dipped in to pitch on the leg stump, only to turn off the pitch and hit the middle and off stumps."

Meanwhile, his brother Eric became an all-rounder in the Surrey team, concentrating on his batting as the team also included spinners such as Jim Laker and Tony Lock. The Bedser twins were difficult to tell apart, both 6'3" tall and just over 15 stone. Playing for Surrey against an England representative team in 1946, they are reputed to have shared an over – Alec bowling the first three balls and then swapping with Eric fielding at mid-on for Eric to complete the over – without being detected by the batsman, Frank Woolley.

In the 1950-51 Ashes series, Alec began his dominance of Australian batsmen, taking 30 wickets at an average of 16.06 and 10 for 105 in the Fifth Test when he ended Australia's unbeaten run of 26 Tests since 1938. In 1953 at 35, an age by which many fast bowlers have retired from first-class cricket, Bedser demonstrated his longevity by helping England regain the Ashes. He took 39 wickets at an average of 17.48 at home to Australia, including career-best match figures of 14 for 99 in the Nottingham Test.

Bedser founded his success on accuracy of line and length, bowled at a medium pace from a short run-up, using his powerful shoulders and large hands to achieve sharp inswing and surprising batsmen with occasional leg cutters.

Bedser was aged 36 by the first Test of the 1954–55 tour of Australia. He took 1 for 131 as seven catches were dropped off his bowling, including Arthur Morris (153) before he had scored – and England lost by an innings. He was subsequently diagnosed as suffering from shingles; despite recovering from this, and with a green wicket in the second Test that would have suited his bowling, he was dropped from the side, and watched as the younger Frank Tyson and Brian Statham bowled England to victory. He was recalled for one Test against South Africa in 1955.

In a Test career extending from 1946 to 1955, Bedser played 51 matches and took 236 wickets (average 24.89), at the time the most wickets taken in Test cricket. He was England's post-war bowling spearhead. He had 14 new ball partners, and took five wickets in an innings 15 times and ten wickets in a match five times. His entire first-class career spanned 485 matches, in which he helped Surrey to eight County Championships between 1950 and 1958. Bedser occasionally captained the side in place of Stuart Surridge or Peter May. He took 100 wickets in a county season eleven times, figures that place him high amongst the game's greats. He took five or more wickets in an innings 96 times, and ten wickets or more in a match 16 times. Bedser retired from cricket in 1960, and his brother Eric retired in 1962.

== After retirement ==
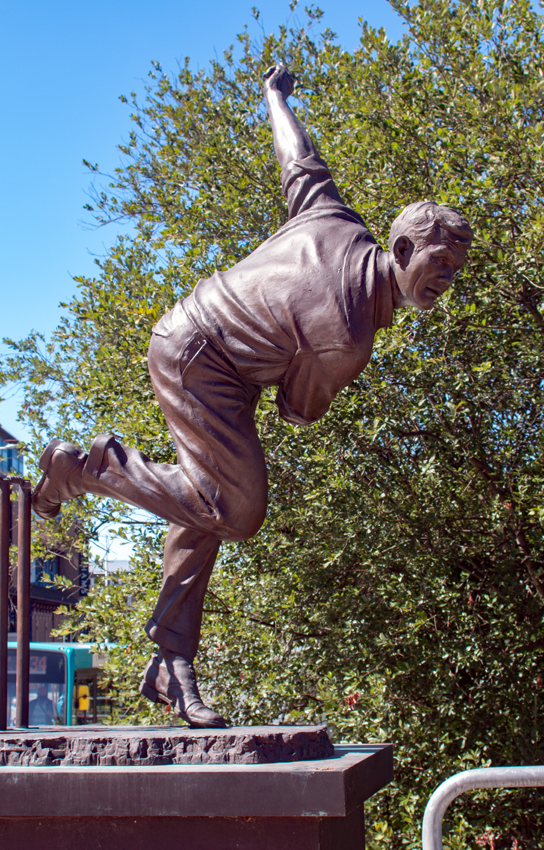
Statue of Alec Bedser by Allan Sly in Woking

After retiring from playing cricket, Bedser went into business with his brother. Among other business interests, they co-operated with Ronald Straker in a successful stationery firm, Straker-Bedser, which was later taken over by Ryman in 1977.

Bedser served as a national team selector from 1962 to 1985, and was chairman of selectors from 1968 to 1981. He was on the board of selectors who controversially left Basil d'Oliveira out of the England team for 1968's tour of South Africa. England won ten of the 18 series while Bedser was chairman of selectors. Bedser also managed two England overseas tours. Bedser was made president of Surrey in 1987 in recognition of his outstanding contribution to the county's cricketing fortunes over the previous five decades. In October 2004 Bedser was selected in 'England's Greatest Post-War XI' by The Wisden Cricketer, an authoritative monthly cricket magazine. In May 2009, Christopher Martin-Jenkins ranked Bedser 29th in picking his 100 greatest cricketers of all time.

Outside of cricket, Bedser was a founding member during the 1970s of the Freedom Association, a right-wing pressure group that advocated the maintenance of sporting relations with South Africa during the apartheid era.

He was appointed an Officer of the Order of the British Empire (OBE) in 1964, advanced to Commander (CBE) in the 1982 Birthday Honours, and in 1997 he was knighted for services to cricket, the first England bowler to receive the honour and the last until Sir James Anderson in 2025.

Neither Alec nor his brother Eric ever married. They lived together in Woking until Eric's death in 2006. Sir Alec Bedser died in hospital in Woking on 4 April 2010 after a short illness. Among those to pay tribute to the more famous of the two brothers was former Prime Minister, well-known cricket lover and lifelong Surrey supporter John Major, who said: "Alec Bedser was one of the greatest medium-fast bowlers of all time. He was also one of the great thinkers about cricket and his wisdom was one of the great untapped resources of the modern game." For three months following the death of Arthur McIntyre on 26 December 2009, Bedser was the oldest surviving England Test cricketer. On Bedser's death, that distinction passed to Reg Simpson.

== Career highlights ==
=== Tests ===
Test debut: vs India, Lord's, Middlesex, 1946
Last Test: vs South Africa, Old Trafford, Manchester, 1955

- Bedser's best Test batting score of 79 was made against Australia, Headingley, Leeds, 1948
- His best Test bowling figures for an innings, 7 for 44, came against Australia, at Trent Bridge, Nottingham, 1953
- He dismissed Don Bradman, widely regarded as the greatest batsman of all time, on six occasions. Only Hedley Verity (8 times) took Bradman's wicket more often. Bedser was included when Bradman selected a "dream team" shortly before his death in 2001; he was the only Englishman to be so honoured in the XI.

Records
| Preceded by Clarrie Grimmett | Most career wickets in Test cricket 236 wickets (24.89) in 51 Tests; Held record from 24 July 1953 to 26 January 1963 | Succeeded by Brian Statham |
