= Statue of Garfield Sobers =

2002 sculpture by Karl Broodhagen

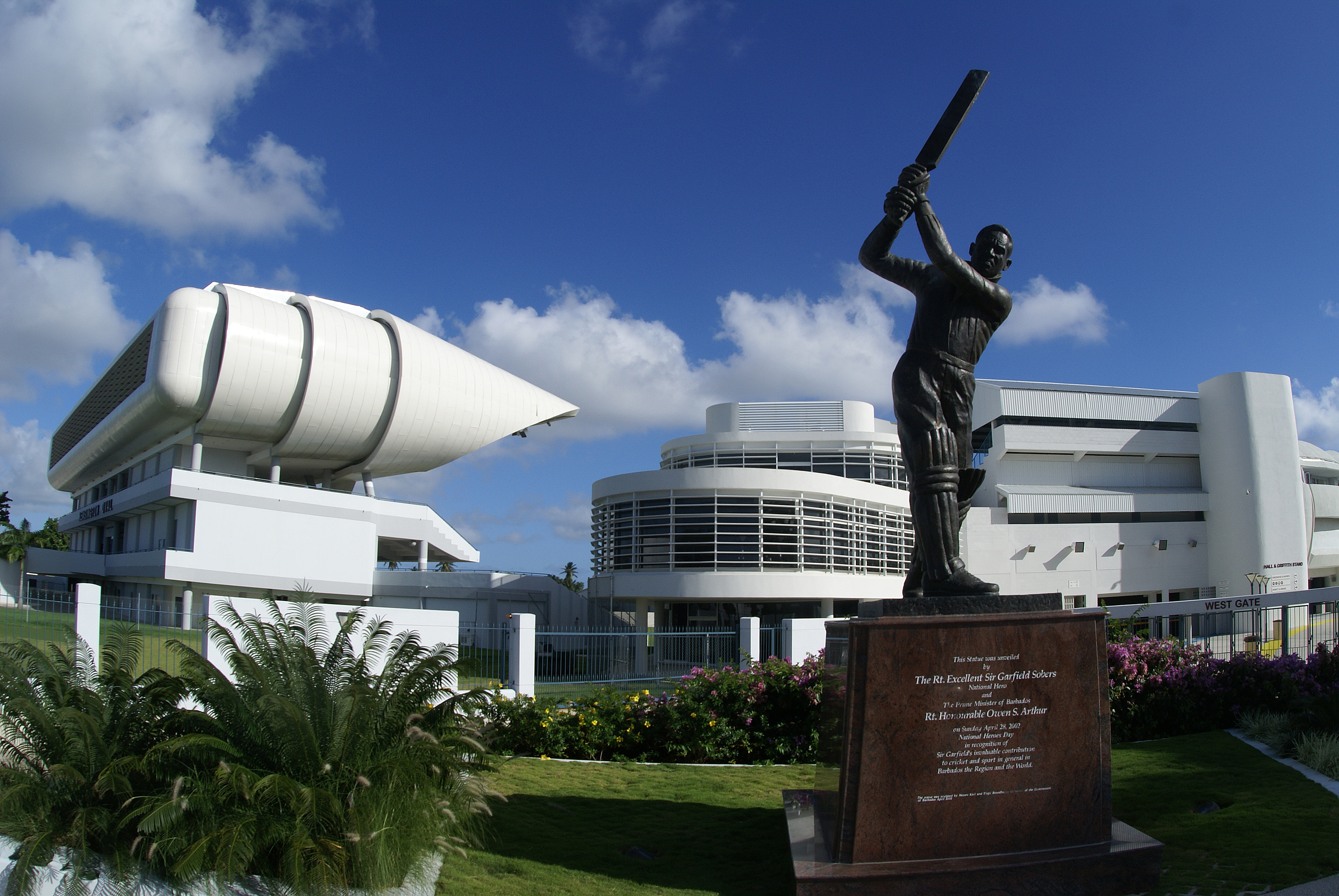
- The Statue of Sobers outside Kensington Oval, Bridgetown, Barbados
- Artist: Karl Broodhagen
- Year: 2002
- Type: Sculpture
- Medium: Bronze
- Subject: Garfield Sobers
- Location: Bridgetown, Barbados

A statue of the Barbadian cricketer Garfield Sobers is situated outside the Kensington Oval cricket ground in Bridgetown, Barbados.

Initial plans for a statue of Sobers had begun in 1977 when it was proposed by the Jamaican cricketer Maurice Foster. The Barbadian government then had a policy opposing statues of living people. Foster proposed the bottom end of Broad Street, a prominent thoroughfare into Bridgetown. It was eventually erected on a roundabout named for Sobers in Wildey and unveiled by the Prime Minister of Barbados Owen Arthur and Sobers himself. On 19 November 2006, prior to the 2007 Cricket World Cup it was relocated to its present position outside the Kensington Oval cricket ground in Bridgetown and unveiled on 28 April 2002.

The statue was sculpted by Karl Broodhagen and his son Virgil from bronze. It is 12 ft in height. Sobers' biographer David Tossell describes the statue as depicting Sobers "clubbing the ball down the ground". The statue was cast at the Morris Singer foundry in Lasham in Hampshire and given to High Commissioner of Barbados, Peter Simmons, upon its completion. It took a team of two people six months to make. It was expected to take four weeks to reach Barbados by sea.
