= National Union of Public Workers =

Barbadian trade union

NUPW
- National Union of Public Workers
- Unity, Service, Strength, Knowledge, Charity
- Founded: 1944
- Headquarters: Bridgetown, Barbados
- Location: Barbados
- Members: 8,000
- Key people: Joseph E. Goddard, general secretary
- Affiliations: CCL, UNI, PSI
- Website: www.nupwbb.com

The National Union of Public Workers (NUPW) is a trade union in Barbados. It represents 10,000 workers, mainly in the public sector. It was established in 1944, and registered as a trade union in 1964. In 1971 it changed its name from the Barbados Civil Service Association (BSCSA).
