= Frank Leslie Walcott =

Barbadian trade unionist, politician and diplomat

Sir Frank Leslie Walcott, KA, OBE (16 September 1916 – 24 February 1999) was a Barbadian trade unionist, politician, ambassador and one of the eleven National Heroes of Barbados. He played a key role in organizing the Barbados labour movement and was a major figure in stimulating participation in the nation's political process.

Frank Walcott was born in Saint Peter, and his policeman father died when Walcott was very young. He was raised in Bridgetown, where he attended Wesley Hall Boys' Secondary School, excelling in mathematics and debate from an early age. Becoming an active unionist in his mid-twenties, Walcott served the Barbados Workers' Union for over fifty years. He also served three separate terms as president of the Caribbean Congress of Labour, as well as serving in the Governing Body of the International Labour Organization and as Vice-President of the Executive Board of the International Confederation of Free Trade Unions. In addition to these posts, Walcott also served with the American Institute for Free Labour Development and was Chairman of the World Employment Conference.

In politics, Walcott served as a Member of Parliament in the Barbados House of Assembly, from 1945 to 1966 and again from 1971 to 1976. He sat first as a member of the liberal Barbados Labour Party, but broke away from the party over its conservative beliefs to help establish the Democratic Labour Party in its movement towards independence and was a critical figure in its union and trade leanings. During the time between these terms he served as a Senator, and was President of that body from 1986 to 1991. After Barbados gained its independence in 1966, Walcott served as the nation's first Ambassador to the United Nations. He was appointed an Officer of the Order of the British Empire (OBE) in the 1954 Queen's Birthday Honours. In 1987 Walcott was conferred the highest honour in Barbados; he was made a Knight of St. Andrew (KA) of the Order of Barbados.

The Sir Frank Walcott building in Saint Michael, Barbados, is named in his honour. Walcott is also noted for having been an exceptional cricket umpire.

== Notes ==
Trade union offices
Preceded by Hugh Worrell Springer	General Secretary of the Barbados Workers' Union; 1948–1991	Succeeded by Roy Trotman
Preceded by New position	President of the Caribbean Congress of Labour; 1960–1963	Succeeded by Thossy Kelly
Preceded by Thossy Kelly	President of the Caribbean Congress of Labour; 1966–1969	Succeeded by Richard Ishmael
Preceded by Nathaniel Crichlow	President of the Caribbean Congress of Labour; 1977–1980	Succeeded by Vernon Glean
