= Saint George North (Barbados Parliament constituency) =

Parliamentary constituency in Barbados

- Constituency for the House of Assembly of Barbados
- Region: Saint George, Barbados

Current constituency
- Created: 1971

Saint George North is a constituency in the Saint George parish of Barbados. It was established in 1971. Since 2022, it has been represented in the House of Assembly of the Barbadian Parliament by Toni Moore, a member of the BLP. (Note: As with all constituencies, the constituency elects one member of parliament (MP) by the first past the post system of election at least every five years.) The Saint George North constituency is a safe seat for the BLP.

== Boundaries ==
The constituency runs:

From the junction of Highway 4 (Bridgetown-Bulkeley Road) with Buttals St. George’s Church Road at Turnpike, in a westerly direction along the middle of Highway 4 to its junction with Neils-Lower Estate Private Road; thence in a northerly direction along the middle of the Neils-Lower Estate Road to its junction with the Charles Row Bridge-Lower Estate Road; thence in a westerly direction along the middle of the Charles Rowe Bridge-Lower Estate Road to its junction with the Lower Estate-Belle Road; thence in a northerly direction along the Belle Road to its junction with Highway 3; thence in a north easterly direction along the middle of Highway 3 to its junction with Cole Road at Bourne’s Village; thence in a northerly direction along the middle of Cole Road to the culvert where it crosses a gully; thence along this gully in a south westerly, north westerly and north easterly direction to a point opposite Applewhaites Tenantry Road; thence along the line joining this point to the road junction and in a north westerly direction along the Applewhaites Tenantry Road to is junction with Highway E (the Hothersal Turning Bibbys Lane Road); thence in a north easterly direction along the middle of Highway E to its junction with the Bibbys Lane-Applewhaites-Selman-Fisherpond Road; thence in an easterly direction along the middle of the Bibbys Lane Applewhaites-Selman Fisherpond Road to its junction with the Fisherpond-Groves Road; thence in a southerly direction along the middle of the Fisherpond-Groves Road to its junction with the Groves-Parris Hill Road; thence in a north easterly direction along the middle of the Groves-Parris Hill Road to its junction with the Andrews Factory-Redland Road; thence in an easterly direction along the middle of the Andrews-Factory-Redland Road to its junction with the Redland-Uplands Road; thence in a south easterly and then southerly direction along the middle of the Redland Uplands Road to its junction with Highway 3B (the Golden Ridge-Pool Road); thence in an easterly direction along the middle of Highway 3B to its junction with the road leading to Belle Farm; thence in a southerly and then easterly direction along the entrance to Belle Farm to its junction with the Ellesmere-Todds Road; thence in a westerly direction along the middle of the Ellesmere-Todds Road to its junction with the Ellesmere-St. Judes Road-Newbury Road; thence in a westerly direction along the middle of the Ellesmere-St. Judes Road to its junction with Highway X; thence in a southerly direction along Highway X to its junction with the Workmans-Retreat Road; thence along the middle of the Workmans-Retreat Road to its junction with the Free Hill-Jordans Road; thence in a southerly direction along the middle of the Free Hill-Jordans Road to its junction with the St. George’s Church-Buttals Road; thence in a south easterly direction along the middle of the St. George’s Church-Buttals Road to its junction with Highway 4 at the Turnpike (the starting point).

== Members ==
Election	Member	Party
2018	Gline Clarke	BLP
2022	Toni Moore	BLP

== Elections ==
=== 2022 ===
St. George North
Party	Candidate	Votes	%	±%
BLP	Toni Moore	3,295	70.2	−10.6
DLP	Herbert Harewood	1,159	24.7	+12.1
APP	Ferdinand Nicholls	196	4.2	+2.1
Independent	Melissa Taitt	44	0.9	New
Majority		2,136	45.5	−22.7
Turnout		4,694		
BLP hold		Swing	-11.3	

=== 2018 ===
St. George North
Party	Candidate	Votes	%	±%
BLP	Gline Clarke	4,779	80.8	+21.4
DLP	Jepter Ince	745	12.6	−27.9
SB	Grenville Phillips	264	4.5	new
UPP	Everton Holligan	124	2.1	new
Majority		4,034	68.2	+49.3
Turnout		5,912		
BLP hold		Swing	+24.6	
