= Barbados Workers' Union =

Trade union in Barbados

BWU
- Barbados Workers' Union
- Founded: October 1941
- Headquarters: Bridgetown, Barbados
- Location: Barbados
- Members: 25,000
- Key people: Shawn Knight, president general Toni Moore, general secretary
- Affiliations: ITUC, CCL
- Website: www.barbadosworkersunion.org

The Barbados Workers' Union is a national trade union in Barbados. It has 25,000 members and represents them directly, negotiating with individual companies in each sector. Its membership includes workers in industries including agriculture, tourism, and restaurant services, transportation, government and statutory boards, banking and insurance, manufacturing and industry, construction, commerce, and general services.

== History ==
The union was established in October 1941 following the British West Indian labour unrest of 1934–1939. The Barbados Workers' Union Labour College, which is the residential educational arm of the BWU, opened on 20 September 1974.

== General secretaries ==
- 1941: Hugh Worrell Springer
- 1948: Frank Leslie Walcott
- 1992: Roy Trotman
- 2014: Toni Moore

== See also ==
- List of trade unions
