= Roy Trotman =

Barbadian trade unionist and politician

Sir Cardinal LeRoy Trotman, KA (born 9 May 1944) is a Barbadian trade unionist and politician.

== Biography ==
Born in Bathsheba, Barbados, Trotman studied at the University of the West Indies and then Rutgers University. He worked as a teacher and university lecturer, and joined the Barbados Workers' Union (BWU). He was elected as a president of the Modern High School division of the union in the 1960s. In 1971, he began working full-time for the union, initially as personal assistant to its general secretary, Frank Walcott.

In 1978, Trotman was promoted to become deputy general secretary and director of organisation for the union. He also became politically active, and in 1986 won election to the House of Assembly of Barbados, representing St Michael Central for the Democratic Labour Party (DLP). In 1989, he was additionally elected as president of the Caribbean Congress of Labour, and this increased his international profile; in 1992, he was elected as president of the International Confederation of Free Trade Unions.

Walcott became unwell in 1992, and decided to stand down as leader of the BWU. Trotman became acting general secretary, and was then elected as Walcott's successor. In 1994, he switched from the House of Assembly to the Senate of Barbados. The following year, he founded the Congress of Trade Unions and Staff Associations of Barbados, and was elected as its first president. In 2002, he became chair of the workers' group of the International Labour Organization's (ILO) governing body.

Trotman retired from the ILO in 2011, and from the BWU in 2014. In recognition of his work, he was knighted in 2002, and received an honorary doctorate from the University of the West Indies in 2006.

Trade union offices
Preceded by Lascelles Beckford	President of the Caribbean Congress of Labour; 1989–1995	Succeeded by Lloyd Goodleigh
Preceded by Frank Walcott	General Secretary of the Barbados Workers' Union; 1992–2014	Succeeded by Toni Moore
Preceded by P. P. Narayanan	President of the International Confederation of Free Trade Unions; 1992–2000	Succeeded by Fackson Shamenda
Preceded by New position	President of the Congress of Trade Unions and Staff Associations of Barbados; 1995–2010	Succeeded by Cedric H. Murrell
