= List of cricketers who were knighted =

This is a list of cricketers who were also knighted. The list is divided into two categories: one for those (22 players) who were knighted for their services to cricket, and one for Test cricketers (8 players) who were knighted for other reasons.

A separate list shows Test cricketers who hold or have held other notable titles, including baronetcies and Indian princely titles.

== Knighted for services to cricket ==
This section includes all administrators, coaches, cricketers, umpires and writers who were knighted for their services to the game.

=== Australia ===
1. Sir Donald George Bradman AC (1908–2001), knighted in 1949 for services to cricket.

=== England ===
1. Sir Francis Eden Lacey (1859–1946), the first person to be knighted (1926) for services to cricket, or indeed any sport; these included his role as the Secretary of the MCC from 1898 to 1926.
2. Sir Frederick Charles Toone (1868–1930), knighted in 1929 for services to cricket.
3. Sir Pelham Francis "Plum" Warner MBE (born in Trinidad; 1873–1963), knighted in 1937 for services to cricket.
4. Sir John Berry "Jack" Hobbs (1882–1963), knighted in 1953 for services to cricket.
5. Sir Henry Dudley Gresham "Shrimp" Leveson-Gower (1873–1954), knighted in 1953 for services to cricket.
6. Sir Leonard "Len" Hutton (1916–1990), knighted in 1956 for services to cricket.
7. Sir John Frederick Neville Cardus CBE (1888–1975), knighted in 1967 for services to music and cricket journalism. Did not play first-class cricket.
8. Sir George Oswald Browning "Gubby" Allen CBE (born in Australia; 1902–1989), knighted for services to cricket in 1986.
9. The Lord Cowdrey of Tonbridge CBE (born in India; 1932–2000), knighted in 1992 for services to cricket.
10. Sir Alec Victor Bedser CBE (1918–2010), knighted in 1996 for services to cricket.
11. The Lord Botham OBE (born 24 November 1955), knighted in 2007 for services to charity and to cricket.
12. Sir Alastair Nathan Cook CBE (born 25 December 1984), knighted in 2019 for services to cricket.
13. Sir Geoffrey Boycott OBE (born 21 October 1940), knighted in 2019 for services to sport.
14. Sir Andrew John Strauss OBE (born in South Africa; 2 March 1977), knighted in 2019 for services to sport.
15. Sir James Michael Anderson OBE (born 30 July 1982), knighted in 2025 for services to cricket.

=== New Zealand ===
1. Sir Richard John Hadlee MBE (born 3 July 1951), knighted in 1990 for services to cricket.

=== West Indies ===
1. Sir Frank Mortimer Maglinne Worrell (born in Barbados; 1924–1967), knighted in 1964 for services to cricket.
2. Sir Garfield St Aubrun "Garry" Sobers AO OCC (born in Barbados; 1936–2026), knighted in 1975 for services to cricket.
3. Sir Clyde Leopold Walcott KA GCM OBE (born in Barbados; 1926–2006), created a Knight of St Andrew of the Order of Barbados in 1993 for services to cricket.
4. Sir Everton de Courcy Weekes KCMG GCM OBE (born in Barbados; 1925–2020), knighted in 1995 for services to cricket.
5. Sir Conrad Cleophas Hunte KA (born in Barbados; 1932–1999), created a Knight of St Andrew of the Order of Barbados in 1998 for services to cricket.
6. Sir Isaac Vivian Alexander "Viv" Richards KNH OBE (born in Antigua; 7 March 1952), created a Knight of the Order of the National Hero in 1999 by the Antiguan government.
7. Reverend Sir Wesley Winfield Hall (born in Barbados; 12 September 1937), knighted in 2012 for services to cricket and the community.
8. Sir Curtly Elconn Lynwall Ambrose (born in Antigua; 21 September 1963), knighted by the Antiguan government in 2014 for services to cricket.
9. Sir Anderson Montgomery Everton "Andy" Roberts (born in Antigua; 29 January 1951), knighted by the Antiguan government in 2014 for services to cricket.
10. Sir Richard Benjamin "Richie" Richardson (born in Antigua; 12 January 1962), knighted by the Antiguan government in 2014 for services to cricket.
11. Sir Charles Christopher Griffith KA (born in Barbados; 14 December 1938), created a Knight of St Andrew of the Order of Barbados in 2017 for services to cricket.
12. Sir Clive Hubert Lloyd CBE (born in Guyana; 31 August 1944), knighted in the 2020 New Years Honours List for services to cricket.
13. Sir Cuthbert Gordon Greenidge KCMG MBE (born in Barbados; 1 May 1951), created a Knight Commander of the Order of St. Michael and St. George in the 2020 New Years Honours List for services to cricket and the development of sport.

== Knighted for other reasons ==
This list includes only Test cricketers; there are many others who played cricket at a variety of other levels, from school cricket to first-class cricket.

=== England ===
- Sir Francis Stanley Jackson GCSI GCIE KStJ (1870–1947), created Knight Grand Commander of the Order of the Indian Empire in 1927, after becoming Governor of Bengal. Made a Knight of Justice of the Venerable Order of Saint John and Knight Grand Commander of the Order of the Star of India in 1932 after an assassination attempt.
- Sir Charles Aubrey Smith CBE (1863–1948), knighted in 1944 for services to Anglo-American amity.

=== India ===
- The Maharajkumar of Vizianagram (1905–1965), knighted in 1936 by King Edward VIII. Renounced his knighthood in 1947 after India gained independence.

=== New Zealand ===
- Sir Jack Newman KBE (1902–1996), created Knight Commander of the Order of the British Empire in 1977 for services to the transport industry.

=== Zimbabwe ===
- Sir Murray Bisset (1876–1931), knighted in 1928 for services to the Commonwealth after serving as Acting Governor of Southern Rhodesia.
- Sir William Henry Milton (born in England; 1854–1930), knighted for his service as Administrator of Mashonaland and later as Administrator of Southern Rhodesia.

=== West Indies ===
- The Lord Constantine MBE (born in Trinidad; 1901–1971), knighted in 1962, primarily for his work as a lawyer, politician and diplomat.

== Other titles ==
- Bill Woodfull was offered a knighthood in 1934 for services to cricket, but turned it down, making Donald Bradman the only Australian cricketer to be knighted. He later received an OBE for services to education.
- George Harris and Martin Hawke both inherited hereditary peerages, becoming the 4th Baron Harris and the 7th Baron Hawke respectively.
- Learie Constantine and Colin Cowdrey both received life peerages, becoming Baron Constantine and Baron Cowdrey of Tonbridge respectively.
- David Sheppard, later Bishop of Liverpool, received a life peerage in 1997 for services to the church, becoming Baron Sheppard of Liverpool.
- Tim O'Brien inherited his father's baronetcy, becoming Sir Tim O'Brien, 3rd Baronet, of Merrion Square and Boris-in-Ossory, in the Baronetage of the United Kingdom.
- Rachael Heyhoe Flint received a life peerage in 2011, becoming Baroness Heyhoe Flint, of Wolverhampton in the County of West Midlands.
- Ian Botham received a life peerage in 2020, becoming Baron Botham, of Ravensworth in the County of North Yorkshire.
- Five other Test cricketers had Indian princely titles:
  - Ranjitsinhji Vibhaji Jadeja, Maharaja Jam Sahib of Nawanagar (England; commonly known as "Ranji")
  - Iftikhar Ali Khan, the 8th Nawab of Pataudi (England and India; commonly known as the Nawab of Pataudi Snr)
  - his son, Mansoor Ali Khan, the 9th and last Nawab of Pataudi (India; commonly known as the Nawab of Pataudi Jnr)
  - Sir Vijayananda Gajapathi Raju, the Maharajkumar of Vizianagram (India; commonly known as "Vizzy")
  - Yadavindra Singh, the Yuvraj of Patiala (India; commonly known as the Yuvraj of Patiala, became Maharaja of Patiala in 1938 after his only Test appearance).
- Notably, in 2005, the entire English team that played in the 2005 Ashes series were appointed MBEs for regaining the Ashes, with captain Michael Vaughan and coach Duncan Fletcher (who also played for Zimbabwe) being appointed OBEs.

== See also ==
- List of sporting knights and dames
- Orders, decorations, and medals of the United Kingdom
