= Caribbean Congress of Labour =

Regional trade union federation in the Caribbean

CCL
- Caribbean Congress of Labour
- Founded: 1960
- Headquarters: Saint Michael, Barbados
- Location: Caribbean
- Members: 500,000 in 17 countries
- Key people: Jennifer Isaacs-Dotson, President; Asokore Beckles, General Secretary
- Affiliations: Independent

The Caribbean Congress of Labour (CCL) is a regional trade union federation. It represents 500,000 members in 33 affiliated unions across 17 Caribbean nations.

The federation represents trade union concerns to the Caribbean Community (CARICOM), as well as the Association of Caribbean States (ACS), and the Organisation of Eastern Caribbean States (OECS).

The CCL works with both the International Trade Union Confederation (ITUC) and the Inter American Regional Organisation (ORIT).

== Leadership ==
=== General Secretaries ===
1960: Osmond Dyce
1966: Basil Blackman
1969: Gaston Benjamin
1973: Burns Bonadie
1983: Kertist Augustus
1998: George De Peana
2007: Lincoln Lewis
2010: Chester Humphrey
2016: Asokore Beckles
2022: Michael Annisette

=== Presidents ===
1960: Frank Walcott
1963: Thossy Kelly
1966: Frank Walcott
1969: Richard Ishmael
1973: Nathaniel Crichlow
1977: Frank Walcott
1980: Vernon Glean
1983: Leonard Archer
1986: Lascelles Beckford
1989: Roy Trotman
1995: Lloyd Goodleigh
2001: Lincoln Lewis
2007: Jacqueline Jack
2010: David Massiah
2016: Jennifer Isaacs-Dotson
2022: Andre Lewis

== See also ==
- List of trade unions
- List of federations of trade unions
