= List of members of the Senate of Barbados =

Current list of the members of the Senate of Barbados:

== Government Senators ==
According to the Constitution of Barbados, twelve (12) Senators shall be appointed by the President, on the advice of the Prime Minister. On January 24, 2022, days after the 2022 election, Prime Minister Mia Mottley announced her intention to nominate the following persons to sit as Government Senators:

Senator	Position
Reginald R. Farley	President of the Senate
H. Elizabeth Thompson	Deputy President of the Senate
Lisa Cummins	Leader of Government Business; Minister for Tourism and International Transport
Jerome Walcott	Senior Minister coordinating Social and Environmental Policy; Minister of Foreign Affairs and Foreign Trade
Dr. Shantal Munro-Knight	Minister in the Prime Minister's Office
Dr. Crystal Haynes	
John Andrew King	
Pat Parris	
Charles Morris	
Roshanna Trim	
Andwele Boyce	
Gregory Nicholls	

== Independent Senators ==
The Constitution normally provides for the appointment of seven (7) individuals to sit in the Senate, appointed by the President in his own discretion, i.e. Independent Senators. The following persons were sworn in by Dame Sandra Mason on February 1, 2022. The final 2 senators were sworn in April 8, 2022, in lieu of no opposition leader to appoint 2 opposition senators. On February 14, 2024, with newly appointed Opposition Leader Ralph Thorne assuming office, 2 opposition senators were appointed replacing Chelston Brathwaite and Kristina Hinds, the aforementioned senators appointed in lieu of an opposition.

Senator	Profession
Monique Taitt	Attorney-at-Law
John Rogers	Reverend
Kevin Boyce	Attorney-at-Law
Christopher Maynard	Doctor
Crystal Drakes	Economist
Andrew Mallalieu	Businessman
Lindell Nurse	Politician

== Opposition Senators ==
Senator	Profession
Ryan Walters	Businessman
Andre Worrell	Acting President of the DLP

== See also ==
- List of presidents of the Senate of Barbados
- List of members of the House of Assembly of Barbados
