= Roshanna =

Roshanna is a feminine given name. Notable people with the name include:

- Roshanna Chatterji, DC Comics character
- Roshanna Trim (born 1995), Barbadian politician

== See also ==
- Roshan
