= List of presidents of the Senate of Barbados =

The president of the Senate of Barbados is the presiding officer of Senate of Barbados. This position was preceded by the president of the Legislative Council of Barbados. The President of the Senate is to perform presidential duties in the absence of the President.

Below is a list of office-holders:

Name	Entered office	Left office
Sir H.G. Massiah, K.B.E., M.B., C.M.	1964	1966
The Hon. Sir E. Stanley Robinson, C.B.E.	1966	1971
The Hon. Sir J.E. Theodore Brancker, Q.C., F.Z.S.	1971	1976
The Hon. Sir Arnott Samuel Cato, K.A., K.C.M.G.	1976	1986
The Hon. Sir Frank L. Walcott, O.B.E., LL.D.	1986	1992
The Hon. Marcus deLambert Jordan	1992	1994
The Hon. Sir Fred Gollop, K.A.	1994	2008
The Hon. Sir Branford Taitt, K.A.	2008	2012
The Hon. Kerryann Ifill (Kerryann Ifill became the first blind person to be chosen for the job of President of the Senate)	2012	2018
The Hon. Sir Richard Lionel Cheltenham	2018	2020
The Hon. Reginald Farley	2020	Incumbent

== Sources ==
- Official website of the Parliament of Barbados
- Presidents of the Senate

== See also ==
- List of Members of the Senate of Barbados
- List of current presidents of assembly
