= Knight or Dame of St Andrew =

Former Barbadian order of chivalry

- Country: Barbados
- Status: Obsolete
- Established: 25 July 1980
- Ribbon of the Order of Barbados

Knight or Dame of St Andrew was an award within the Order of Barbados that was part of the national honours system of Barbados when the country was still a realm within the Commonwealth.

== History ==
The Order of Barbados was instituted by Queen Elizabeth II by letters patent dated 25 July 1980. With Barbados becoming a republic on 30 November 2021, a new Order of Barbados came into force that was established with the Barbados National Honours and Decorations Act 2021 by the Parliament of Barbados on 28 October 2021, and which replaced the former Order of Barbados. Due to this, the former Order became obsolete and appointments of Knights and Dames of St. Andrew have also ceased. However, all appointments conferred prior to 30 November 2021 pursuant to the Letters Patent continue to be acknowledged as validly conferred, and with the Knights or Dames deemed to be members of the new Order.

== Prestige ==
Until Barbados ceased to be a constitutional monarchy and became a republic on 30 November 2021, Knight or Dame of St. Andrew was the highest honour given by the monarch of Barbados, and was awarded for "extraordinary and outstanding achievement and merit in service to Barbados or to humanity at large".

Most recipients were invested in November during the month-long celebration of Barbadian political independence. When the country was a monarchy, the award was conferred to awardees by the office of the Governor-General of Barbados.

== Styles ==
Conferees are styled as a Knight or Dame of St Andrew. They carry the prefix Sir or Dame, and the post-nominal letters KA (Knight of St Andrew) or DA (Dame of St Andrew).

== Recipients ==
Arranged by prefix, name, post-nominal letters, date of conferral:

- Sir MacDonald Blunt, KA (July 1980)
- Dame Elsie Payne, DA (July 1980)
- Sir Erskine Ward, KA (July 1980)
- Dame Nita Barrow, GCMG, DA, OCC (November 1980)
- Sir Kenneth Hunte, KA, OBE (November 1980)
- Sir Edwy Talma, KA, CBE (November 1980)
- Sir Maurice Byer, KA, OBE (November 1982)
- Sir Ronald Mapp, KA (November 1982)
- Sir Neville Osborne, KA, OBE (November 1983)
- Sir Donald Wiles, KA, CMG, OBE (November 1984)
- Sir Frank Blackman, KCVO, KA, OBE (November 1985)
- Senator Sir Frank Walcott, KA, OBE (November 1987)
- Sir Keith Donnerson Hunte, KA (November 1987)
- Sir Frederick Smith, KA, QC (November 1987)
- Sir Stanley Augustus Blanchette, KA (November 1988)
- Sir William Harvey Clyde Gollop, KA, MBE, JP (November 1988)
- Sir Kenmore Nathaniel Rhystone Husbands, KA, CBE, JP (November 1989)
- The Hon. Sir Douglas Percy Lynch, KA, CMG, QC (November 1990)
- Sir Neville Vernon Nicholls, KA (November 1990)
- Sir James Cliviston King, KA, OBE (November 1992)
- Sir John Stanley Goddard, KA (November 1993)
- Sir Clyde Leopold Walcott, KA, OBE, AA (November 1993)
- The Hon. Sir Harold Bernard St. John, KA, QC (November 1994)
- Sir Clifford Straughn Husbands, KA (November 1995)
- Dame Edna Ermyntrude Bourne, DA (November 1995)
- His Honour Sir Fred Winlyn Gollop, KA (November 1996)
- Sir Henry deBoulay Forde, KA, QC (November 1997)
- Sir Courtney Blackman, KA (November 1998)
- Sir Conrad Hunte, KA (November 1998)
- Sir Stephen Errol Emtage, KA (November 1999)
- The Rt. Hon. Sir Lloyd Erskine Sandiford, KA, JP (November 2000)
- The Rt. Rev. Sir Wilfred Denniston Wood, KA, JP (November 2000)
- Sir David Anthony Cathcart Simmons, KA, BCH (November 2001)
- Sir Aubrey Gordon Leacock, KA, CBE (November 2002)
- Sir Roy Cardinal Trotman, KA (November 2002)
- The Hon. Dame Billie Antoinette Miller, DA, BCH, MP (November 2003)
- Sir Richard Christopher Haynes, KA, FRCP (November 2003)
- The Hon. Sir Richard Lionel Cheltenham, KA, QC, JP (November 2005)
- Dame Olga Christine Lopes-Seale, DA, GCM, MBE, BSS (November 2005)
- Sir Louis Randall Tull, KA, QC, MP (November 2006)
- Sir Hilary McDonald Beckles, KA (November 2007)
- Sir Kyffin Donald Simpson, KA, CBE (November 2007)
- Sir Philip Marlowe Greaves, KA, QC (November 2008)
- Sir Maurice Athelstan King, KA, QC (November 2008)
- Sir Marcus deLambert Jordan, KA (November 2009)
- Sir Branford Mayhew Taitt, KA (November 2010)
- The Hon. Sir Errol Ricardo Walrond, KA (November 2011)
- Sir Marston Creighton Dacosta Gibson, KA (November 2012)
- Sir Frank Walton Alleyne, KA (November 2012)
- Sir Trevor Austin Carmichael, KA (November 2013)
- Sir Trevor Austin Hassell, KA (November 2013)
- Sir Charles Christopher Griffith, KA (November 2017)
- Sir Kenneth Rudolph Hewitt, KA, CBE, BJH (November 2018)
- Sir Philip Evan Serrao, KA, BCH, QC (November 2018)
- Dame Avisene Caesaretta Carrington, DA, SCM 9(November 2018)
- Sir Patterson Keith Herman Cheltenham, KA, GCM, QC (December 2020)
- Sir Rudyard Eggleton Carrington Lewis, KA, GCM, CVO (December 2020)

== See also ==
- Awards of Queen Elizabeth II
