= Kerryann Ifill =

Barbados politician (born 1973)

The Most Honourable Kerryann Ifill FB

President of the Senate of Barbados
- In office March 2012 – May 2018
- Prime Minister: Freundel Stuart
- Preceded by: Branford Taitt
- Succeeded by: Richard Cheltenham

Personal details
- Born: 1973 (age 52–53)

Kerryann F. Ifill (born 20 December 1973) is a Barbadian politician. She served as President of the Senate of Barbados from 2012 to 2018.

She lost her sight due to cataracts at the age of four. She initially had to leave school, before attending a school for the blind from the age of six.

In 1999 Ifill became the first blind person to graduate from the University of the West Indies, gaining a degree in Sociology and Psychology from Cave Hill Campus in her native Barbados. She went on to obtain an MBA at Durham Business School, in England. She had initially considered studying law, with an aim to become a lawyer, but believed she would be unable to achieve that as a blind person, a belief she subsequently regretted.

In 2008 Barbadian Prime Minister David Thompson appointed her to the Senate, and subsequently to the position of deputy President of the Senate.

On 14 March 2012, Prime Minister Freundel Stuart announced that, the following week, he would appoint Ifill President of the Senate. She became the first woman to hold that position, and the first person with a disability, as well as the youngest ever holder of the position, at the age of 38. She succeeded Branford Taitt (in office 2008 to 2012).

Ifill also serves as President of the Barbados Council for the Disabled.
