= Hurricane Elsa =

Category 1 Atlantic hurricane in 2021

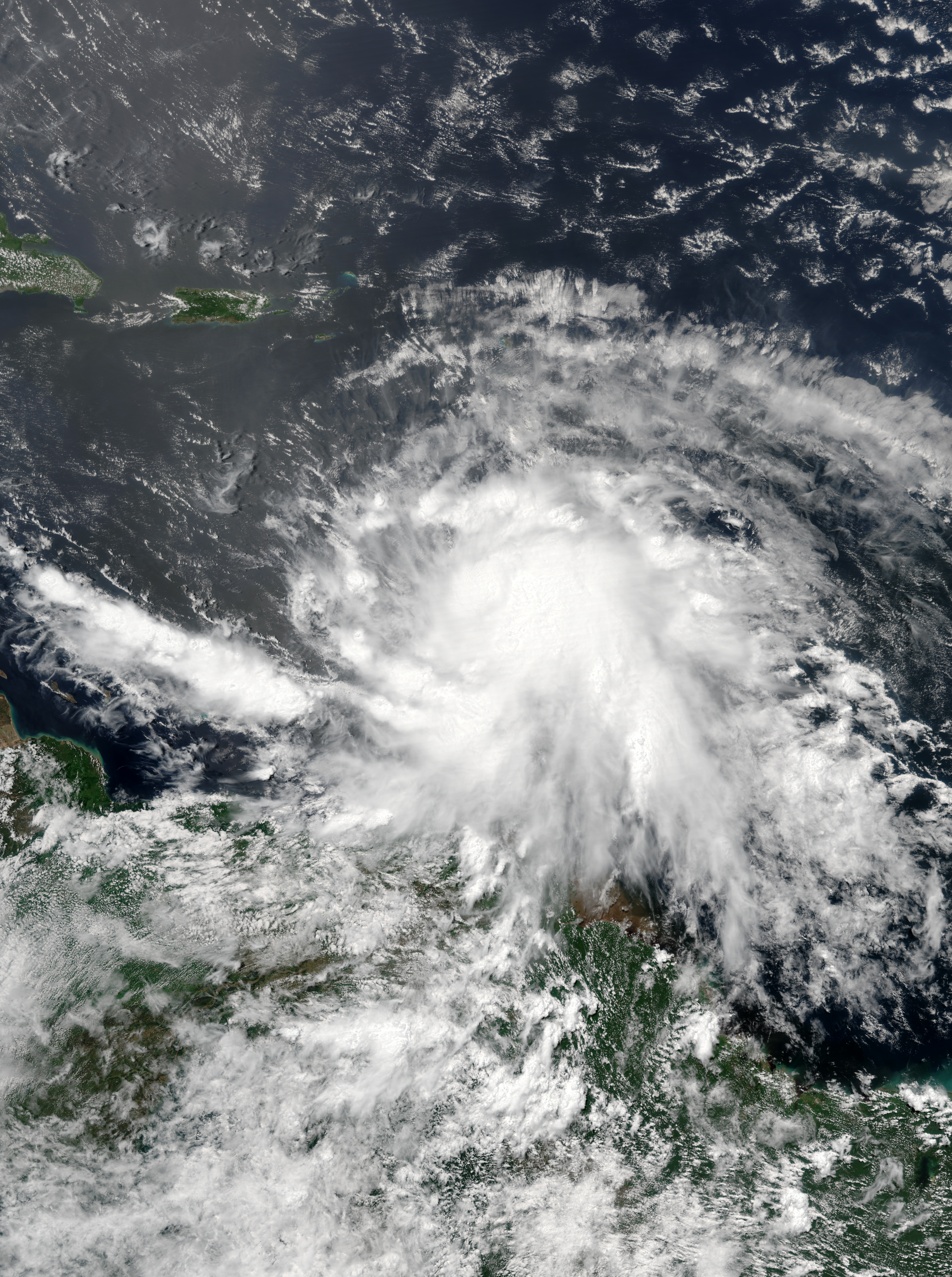
- Elsa at peak intensity after passing through the Lesser Antilles on July 2

Meteorological history
- Formed: June 30, 2021
- Extratropical: July 9, 2021
- Dissipated: July 10, 2021

Category 1 hurricane
- 1-minute sustained (SSHWS/NWS)
- Highest winds: 85 mph (140 km/h)
- Lowest pressure: 991 mbar (hPa); 29.26 inHg

Overall effects
- Fatalities: 13
- Damage: $1.2 billion (2021 USD)
- Areas affected: Lesser Antilles, Greater Antilles, Venezuela, Colombia, East Coast of the United States, Atlantic Canada
- IBTrACS
- Part of the 2021 Atlantic hurricane season

Hurricane Elsa was a destructive tropical cyclone that affected many countries along its path during the 2021 Atlantic hurricane season. It was the earliest-forming fifth named storm on record in the Atlantic Ocean, and the first hurricane of the season. It formed over the central tropical Atlantic, farther east in the Main Development Region than any June storm at the time, except for the 1933 Trinidad hurricane.

Originating from a tropical wave that moved off the west coast of Africa on June 27, the disturbance become organized as a tropical depression on June 30, about 1,150 mi (1,850 km) east-southeast of Barbados, and strengthened to a tropical storm soon thereafter. Then, riding the south edge of a strong subtropical ridge, Elsa moved swiftly westward on July 1, while rapidly intensifying. The storm strengthened to a hurricane around 12:00 UTC on July 2, as its center moved just south of Barbados, and then reached its peak intensity six hours later with maximum 1-minute sustained winds of 85 mph (140 km/h) and a minimum central pressure of 991 mbar (29.3 inHg), about 95 mi (155 km) west-northwest of Saint Vincent. This made Elsa the strongest July hurricane recorded in the eastern Caribbean Sea since Emily in 2005.

On July 3, Elsa weakened back into a tropical storm before slowing down by July 4, as it passed just north of Jamaica. On July 5, Elsa made landfall in Cuba, before emerging into the Gulf of Mexico early on the next day. It then paralleled the west coast of Florida, briefly becoming a minimal hurricane again as it passed west of Tampa, early on July 7. Elsa then weakened back to a tropical storm, before making landfall later that day in Taylor County, Florida, with maximum winds of about 65 mph (100 km/h). Afterward, Elsa began accelerating northeastward across the southeast and Mid-Atlantic states, restrengthening slightly due to the brown ocean effect. Elsa emerged back over water off New Jersey early on July 9, and moved over eastern Long Island and western Rhode Island, before becoming extratropical at 18:00 UTC that day, while moving through New England. Afterward, Elsa's extratropical remnant accelerated northeastward and slowly weakened. The storm dissipated over Atlantic Canada on July 10.

Altogether there were 13 deaths associated with Elsa: nine in the Florida Straits, two in the Dominican Republic, one in Martinique, and one in the United States. As Elsa raced past the Lesser Antilles, it caused extensive damage on several islands. In Barbados, the storm brought down trees, damaged roofs, caused widespread power outages, and caused flash flooding. Its main impact in Cuba was flash flooding and mudslides. The storm caused widespread damage throughout the U.S., especially in the Northeast. Atlantic Canada experienced many outages and high amounts of rainfall from a post-tropical Elsa. The storm dealt upwards of $1.2 billion in damages in the United States, with additional damage in the Caribbean.

== Meteorological history ==
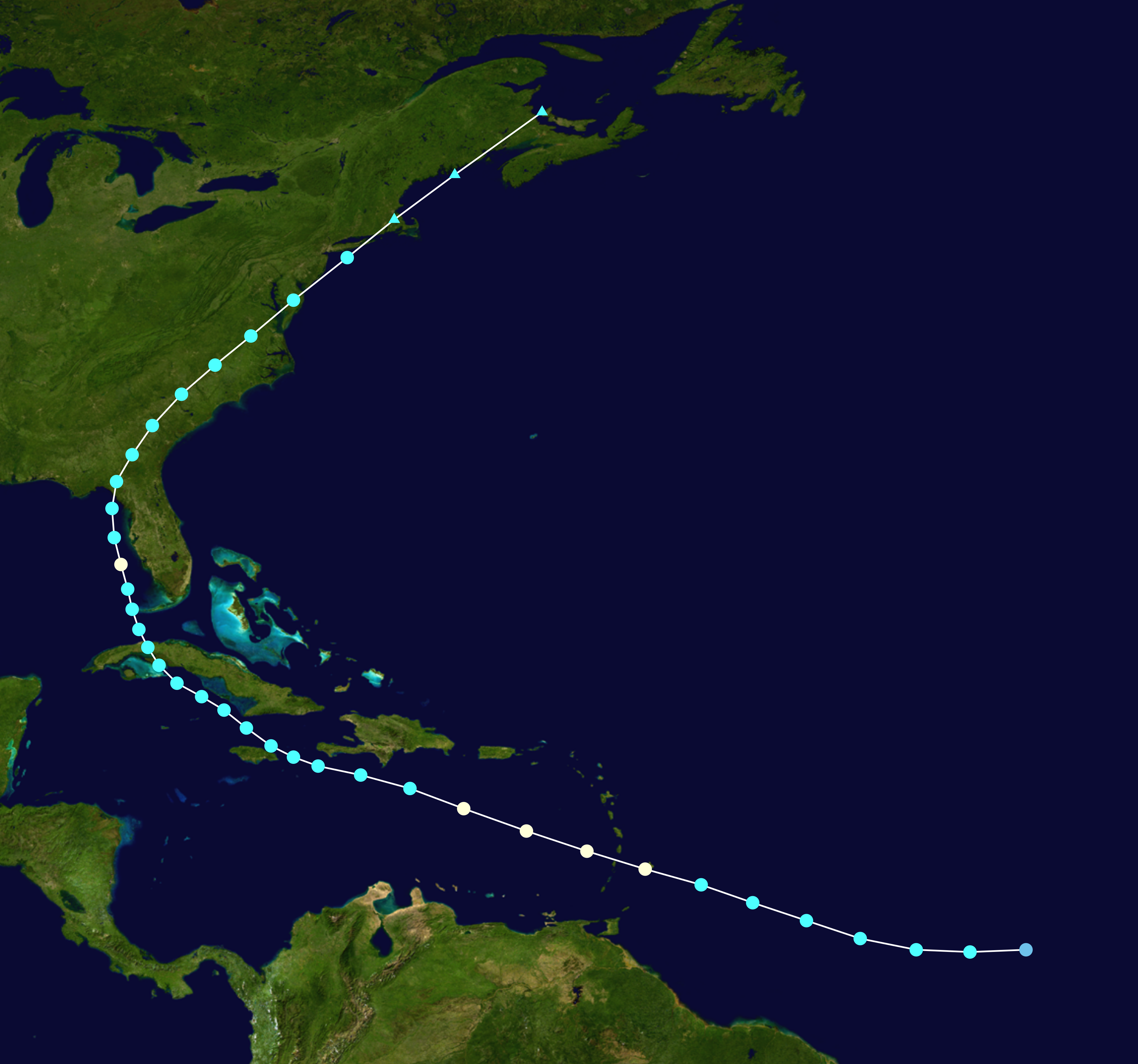
Map plotting the storm's track and intensity, according to the Saffir–Simpson scale Map key Saffir–Simpson scale Tropical depression (≤38 mph, ≤62 km/h) Tropical storm (39–73 mph, 63–118 km/h) Category 1 (74–95 mph, 119–153 km/h) Category 2 (96–110 mph, 154–177 km/h) Category 3 (111–129 mph, 178–208 km/h) Category 4 (130–156 mph, 209–251 km/h) Category 5 (≥157 mph, ≥252 km/h) Unknown Storm type Tropical cyclone Subtropical cyclone Extratropical cyclone, remnant low, tropical disturbance, or monsoon depression

On June 27, a tropical wave emerged off the coast of Africa and tracked quickly westward across the Atlantic Ocean. The wave produced disorganized showers and thunderstorms during the next few days, before a closed and well-defined low pressure system developed by 18:00 UTC on June 30, marking the formation of a tropical depression about 1,150 mi (1,850 km) east-southeast of Barbados. The potential for tropical cyclone formation within the wave was first noted by the National Hurricane Center (NHC) at 12:00 UTC on June 29, and initially given a low (less than 40%) chance of development over the next five days. The 5-day chance of formation was raised to high (greater than 60%) at 06:00 UTC on June 30. Later that day, after the system had moved to near the Lesser Antilles and was expected to become a tropical storm before reaching the islands, the disturbance was designated as Potential Tropical Cyclone Five at 21:00 UTC. However, the system became a tropical cyclone according to post-season analysis three hours before that initial advisory. The depression strengthened to a tropical storm by 00:00 UTC on July 1, while about 980 mi (1,575 km) east-southeast of Barbados, and named Elsa. This made Elsa the earliest fifth-named Atlantic storm in recorded history, surpassing Tropical Storm Edouard of 2020 by five days; it also became only the second tropical storm on record to form so early in the season east of 50°W, after the 1933 Trinidad hurricane.

Elsa became better organized, forming better-defined banding features on the western and southwestern portions of the storm. Well-defined upper-level outflow was produced on the western side of the cyclone, although outflow was ill-defined on the eastern half. Steered by a strong subtropical ridge to its north, the system moved swiftly westward at speeds of around 30 mph (45 km/h). During the same period of time, Elsa began a period of rapid intensification. By early on July 2, microwave and radar data indicated that a small inner core had formed, and surface observations from the southern portion of Barbados, which was estimated to be within the radius of Elsa's maximum wind, reported sustained winds of 74 mph (119 km/h) and a gust to 86 mph (138 km/h), and Elsa strengthened to a hurricane as the center moved just south of Barbados around 12:00 UTC that day. The first hurricane of the 2021 Atlantic hurricane season, its formation came more than a month before the average appearance of the season's first hurricane. Six hours later, Elsa reached its peak intensity with maximum 1-minute sustained winds of 85 mph (140 km/h) and a minimum central pressure of 991 mbar (29.3 inHg), while located about 95 mi (155 km) west-northwest of Saint Vincent. This was the culmination of a 35 mph (55 km/h) intensification over a 24-hour period. Elsa's forward speed increased while it moved across the eastern and central Caribbean Sea early on July 3, but the low-level center became exposed to the west of the main area of deep convection, and it weakened into a tropical storm about 115 mi (185 km) south of the southern coast of the Dominican Republic. The storm continued to lose strength later that day and early on July 4, as the center passed offshore but near the mountainous terrain of southwestern Haiti and then just north of Jamaica. An Air Force Reserve reconnaissance aircraft investigating Elsa late on July 4, found it to be undergoing a convective burst and beginning to restrengthen. At 18:00 UTC on July 5, Elsa made landfall on the south coast of Cuba in Cienaga de Zapata National Park with maximum winds of about 65 mph (100 km/h).

Several hours later, at 02:00 UTC on July 6, Elsa emerged into the Straits of Florida, where it began to regain its strength. The storm once more became a hurricane at 00:00 UTC on July 7, about 50 mi (80 km) west of Englewood, Florida, but weakened back into a tropical storm six hours later. This weakening was likely caused by a combination of wind shear and an entrainment of dry air. Elsa then accelerated northward, and it made landfall in Taylor County, Florida, at 14:30 UTC that same day with maximum winds of about 65 mph (100 km/h). Following landfall, Elsa turned northeastward and gradually began to weaken, though the storm continued to maintain tropical storm intensity. Most of its convection, however, was in a band in the eastern semicircle over the nearby Atlantic Ocean. The center of the storm emerged over the Atlantic off New Jersey early on July 9. After moving northeastward and making landfall on eastern Long Island and western Rhode Island, Elsa became a post-tropical cyclone by 18:00 UTC that same day while over southeastern New England. Elsa's extratropical remnant accelerated northeastward and slowly weakened. The storm dissipated over Atlantic Canada before 12:00 UTC July 10.

== Preparations ==
=== Lesser Antilles ===
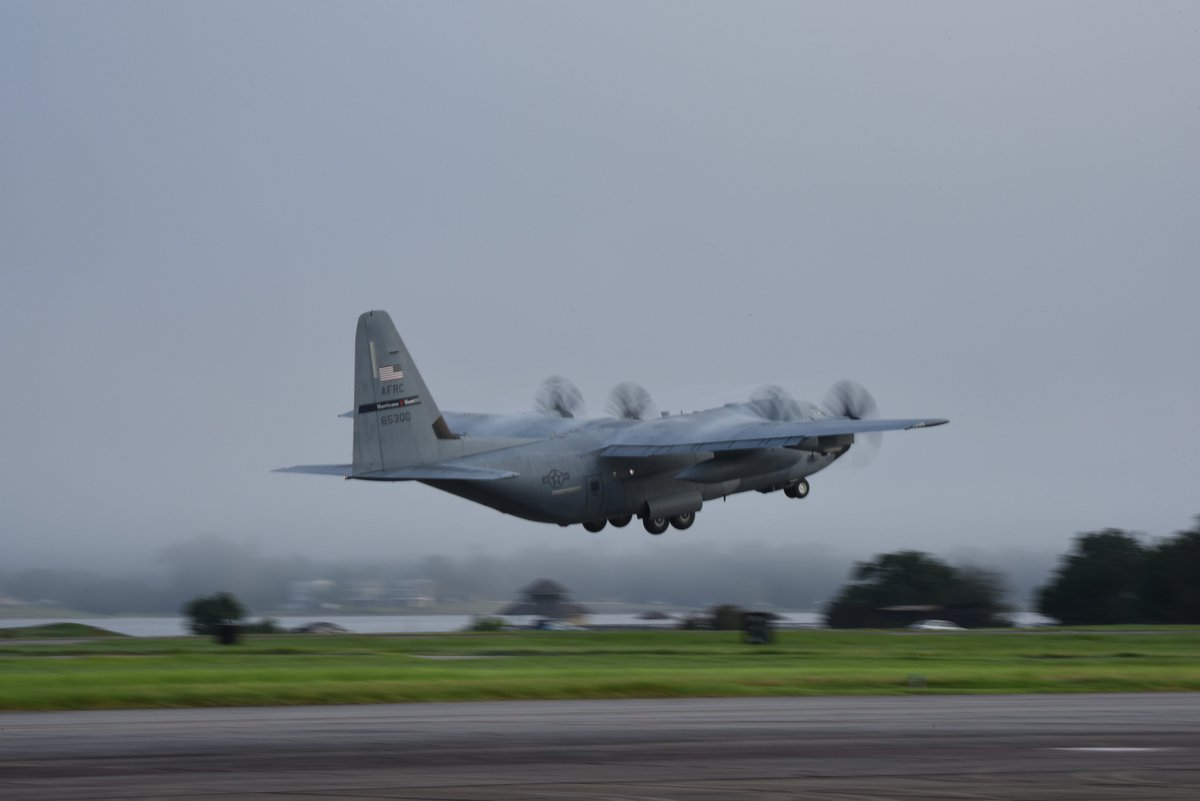
Hurricane Hunters Reconnaissance aircraft taking off from Homestead Air Reserve Base to investigate Tropical Storm Elsa on July 1.

Upon designation as a potential tropical cyclone at 21:00 UTC on June 30, Tropical Storm Watches were issued for the islands of Barbados, Martinique, St. Lucia, and St. Vincent and the Grenadines. Shortly afterward, the Government of France also issued a Tropical Storm Watch for Guadeloupe. These were later upgraded to Tropical Storm Warnings in Barbados, Martinique, and St. Lucia early on July 1. On July 2, 2021, Sint Eustatius also issued a hurricane warning.

In Barbados, marine and flash flood advisories were posted on the island by June 30, in addition to the tropical cyclone watches and warnings by the meteorological service of the country. A rainfall total of 6–8 inches (15–20 cm) were also expected within Elsa's passage on the country, according to the Barbados Meteorological Service. Home Affairs Minister Wilfred Abrahams urged residents to shelter in place unless their homes were damaged; this was echoed by Department of Emergency Management Kerry Hinds. The DEM also advised residents to make hurricane preparations and to only use emergency shelters as a last resort. The Port Saint Charles opened for large fishing vessels more than 25 feet (7.6 m) to dock during Elsa. The island country was also in a lockdown as the people there rush to protect their homes and buy food supplies ahead of the hurricane while 54 native individuals in the area were brought in evacuation shelters to ride out the storm. CSEC and CAPE exams are announced to be postponed on July 2 while a quarantine facility was moved to safety as it was near the coast. All pumping stations on the island of Barbados were shut down as a precautionary measure.

Elsa threatened the Windward Islands during the 2021 eruption of La Soufrière on St. Vincent, with interests in the region being asked to monitor for official updates. Flash floods, landslides and lahars were also expected on the island and as a result, persons near these prone areas were ordered to evacuate immediately. 3 to 6 inches (7.6 to 15.2 cm) of rain was forecasted for the country by July 2, while 2 inches (5.1 cm) were expected for the next day. The National Emergency Management Organisation of the area also warned the public to not venture outside as conditions will be dangerous due to Elsa. Businesses, schools and other public utilities were instructed to temporarily close due to the hurricane, except essential workers such as police, health services and others which has to remain alert under their departments. Ferry services between the Saint Vincent Island and the Grenadine Islands were suspended starting July 1, while 94 shelters across the former were prepared for those who need to evacuate due to Elsa. The Argyle International Airport were also closed starting that day while marine advisories were posted on the island until July 4 for small fishcrafts. Martinique was also placed on a yellow alert, in sync with another tropical wave ahead of Elsa.

In Saint Lucia, a national shutdown was declared for July 2, with residents being advised to remain indoors until an all clear was given. The George F. L. Charles Airport and Hewanorra International Airport ceased operations for that same day. Banks across St. Lucia were closed in accordance with the national shutdown, but mobile and online banking, ATMs, and night depository services remained available for use. Local weather offices urged small craft to remain at port for the hurricane and for those in flood and landslide-prone areas to take precautions. Two examination council events that students could partake in had to be called off due to the hurricane. A COVID-19 vaccination drive was also postponed due to the storm.

=== Greater Antilles ===
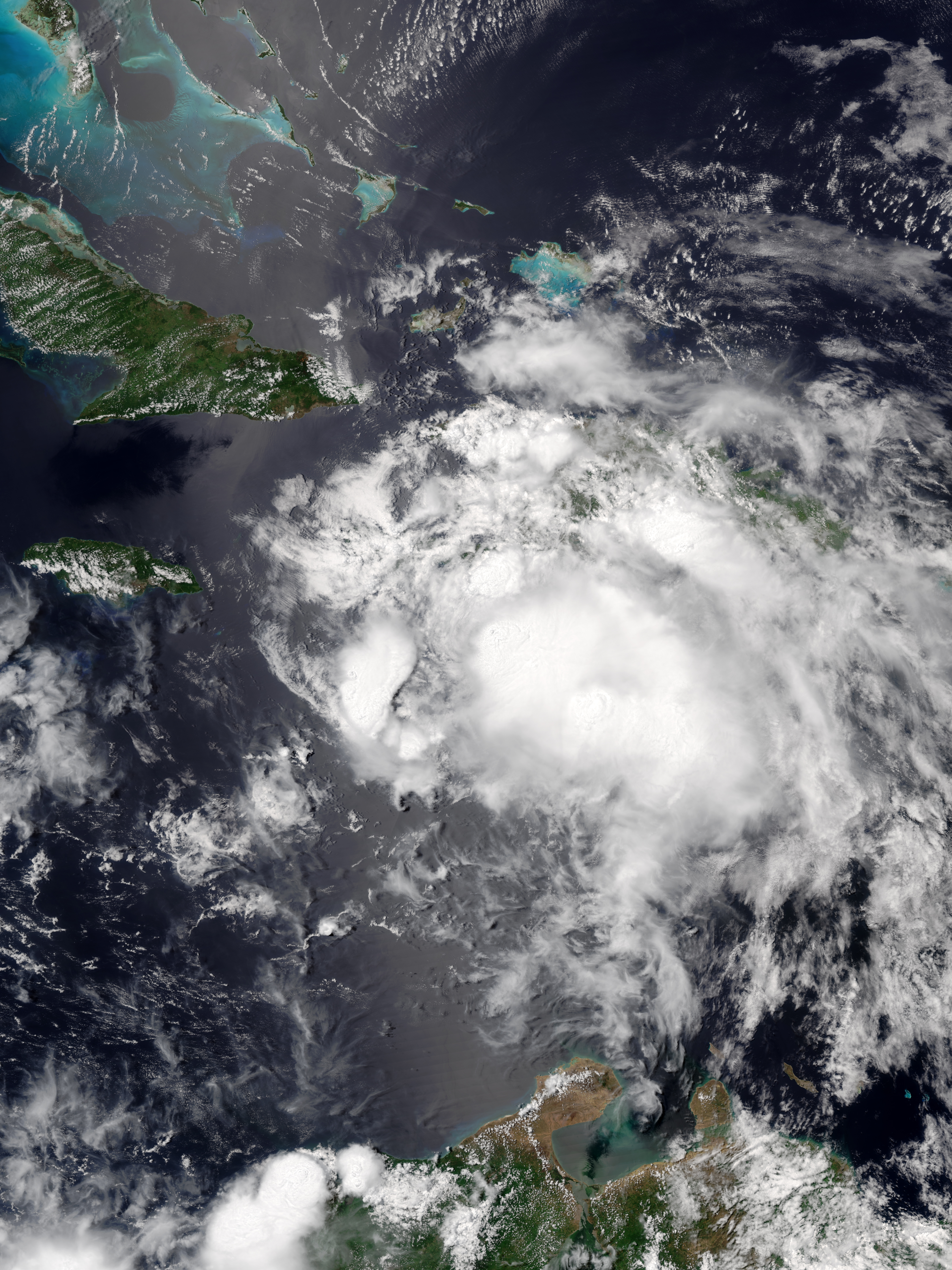
A weakened Tropical Storm Elsa south of Haiti on July 3

A Tropical Storm Watch was put in effect for the southern and western coasts of Haiti from the Dominican Republic–Haiti border to Môle-Saint-Nicolas at 21:00 UTC on July 1. A few hours later, a Tropical Storm Watch was ordered for the Dominican Republic from the border with Haiti eastward to Punta Palenque, as well as the entire island of Jamaica. By 9:00 UTC the next day, the watch in the Dominican Republic was upgraded into a Tropical Storm Warning from Cape Engaño to the Haitian border. The Tropical Storm Warning further extended through all of Haiti, and a Hurricane Watch was posted from the international border to the national capital of Port-au-Prince. Six hours later, the Hurricane Watch in Haiti was upgraded to a Hurricane Warning, with a Hurricane Watch being issued for Jamaica as well as the Dominican Republic from the international border to Punta Palenque. Also in the Dominican Republic, a Tropical Storm Watch was put in place from Cape Engaño to Bahia de Manzanillo on the northern coast of the country. At around 18:00 UTC, a Tropical Storm Watch was issued for the Cayman Islands. Then, by 21:00 UTC on the same day, a Hurricane Warning was issued for Jamaica, and a Hurricane Watch was issued for the Cuban provinces of Camaguey, Granma, Guantanamo, Holguin, Las Tunas, and Santiago de Cuba. The Hurricane Warning in Jamaica was downgraded to a Tropical Storm Warning, and the Tropical Storm Watch in Cuba was upgraded to a warning, with a new watch extending to Ciego de Avila, Sancti Spiritus, Villa Clara, Cienfuegos, and Matanzas provinces, at 15:00 UTC on July 3. About six hours later, the remaining Tropical Storm Watch in Cuba was once again upgraded to a warning with Mayabeque Province and Havana being placed under a Tropical Storm Watch. Early on July 4, the Hurricane Warning in Haiti was downgraded to a Tropical Storm Warning and the previous Tropical Storm Warning in place north of Port-au-Prince was cancelled.

Authorities in Haiti used social media to alert people about Elsa in advance of the quickly approaching storm. They urged coastal and mountainous communities to evacuate. The Civil Protection Agency said that the "whole country [was] threatened." The country's president had just been assassinated amid a spike in gang violence in the country, and as the violence forced thousands from their homes, food and water shortages exacerbated these problems. Director Jerry Chandler told the Associated Press that officials are still figuring out how to send supplies to Haiti's southern region.

=== United States ===
At 21:00 UTC on July 3, a Tropical Storm Watch was issued for the Florida Keys from the Dry Tortugas to Craig Key. This was upgraded to a Tropical Storm Warning at 15:00 UTC on July 4, as Elsa moved closer to the area. There were also two more Tropical Storm Watches put in place. One was issued for the Florida Keys from Craig Key to Ocean Reef (Key Largo). The other watch was issued for an area from Flamingo to Bonita Beach. On July 2, Florida Governor Ron DeSantis declared a state of emergency for 15 counties within the state. Officials planned to protect on-site equipment being used to search for survivors of the Surfside condo collapse, which was underway at the time. DeSantis also expressed his concern that high winds from Elsa could cause further collapse of the structure. As a result, rescue teams suspended their search for the remaining 121 people missing, and, on the night of July 4, demolished the remaining portion of the condominium. On the same day, President Joe Biden approved the emergency declaration and federal assistance from the Federal Emergency Management Agency (FEMA) as Elsa moved closer to the south Florida coast. Mandatory evacuations were underway in Monroe and Indian River counties as the storm approached, and Franklin, Dixie, Hernando, and Hillsborough counties had voluntary evacuations. The state was projected to have enough resources to provide for the forecasted impacts.

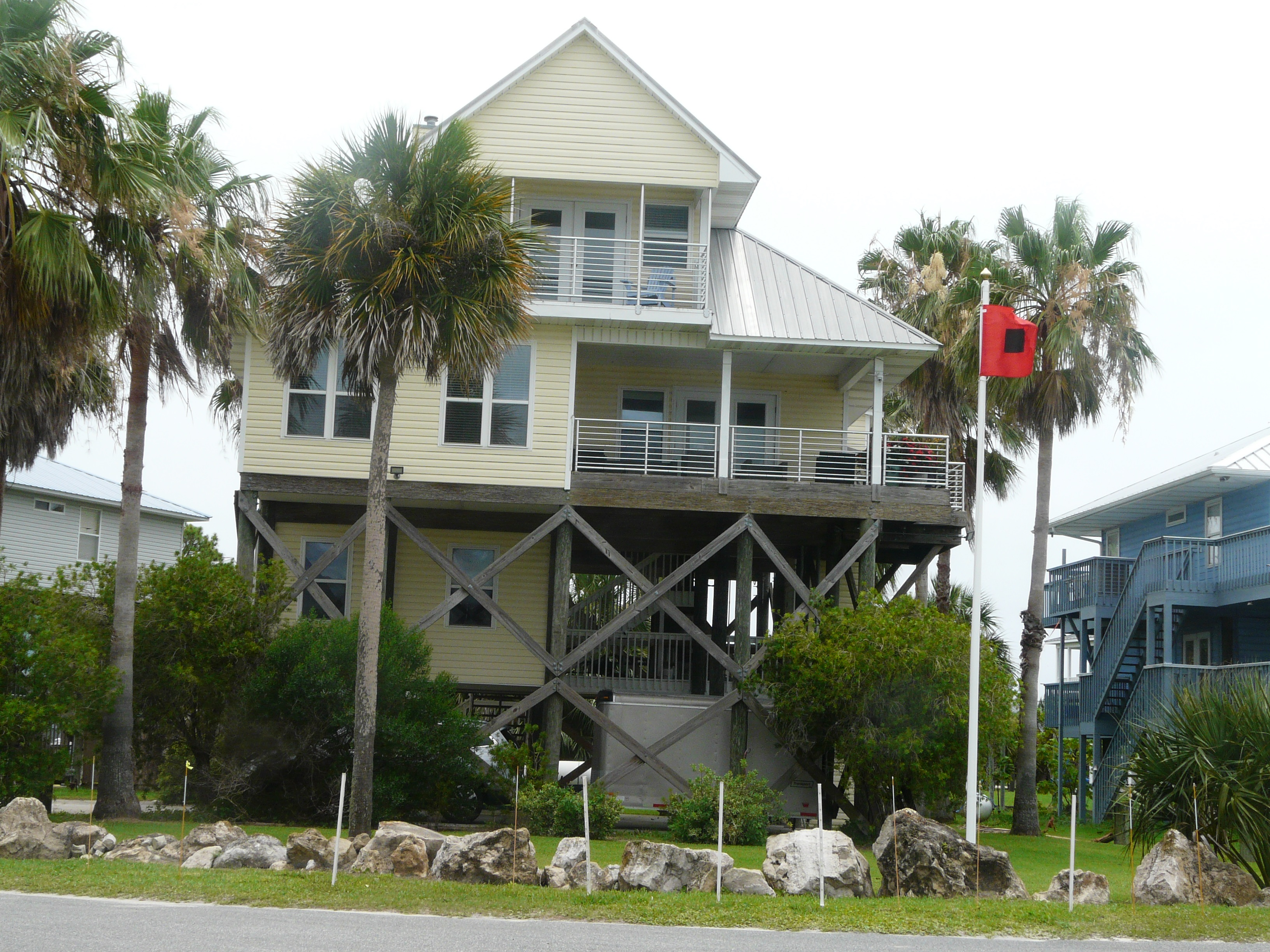
Storm warning flag in front of a house during the passage of Tropical Storm Elsa in July 2021.

Multiple sandbags were given out at several locations for locals to use for protection. A couple storm shelters also opened on the morning of July 6, in at least four counties around the Tampa Bay area. No evacuations were ordered, though. Several events, government offices, and schools were cancelled and closed in advance of the approaching storm as well. Tampa International Airport temporarily suspended operations on the same day due to the storm, reopening the next morning, with Sarasota Bradenton International Airport following suit. The De Soto National Memorial was closed by the National Park Service on July 5 in preparation of the storm. Georgia Governor Brian Kemp declared a state of emergency for 92 counties. This allowed state aid. Over 50 million were under flash flood watches from the Carolinas to Maine, including cities Baltimore, Philadelphia, New York, and Boston. They also extended out to Canada. The NHC warned for "considerable urban flooding" for the Northeast.

Up to 1 to 3 inches (25 to 76 mm) inches of rainfall was forecasted for New England, starting around 1 PM EDT and continuing until sunset. Scattered thunderstorms were also expected to form, exacerbating already possible downpours.

=== Colombia ===
On July 2, 2021, Colombian authorities issued a warning of heavy rainfall and waves of up to three meters on the Caribbean coasts of the country. This was expected before the storm headed to the Dominican Republic and Haiti.

== Impact ==
=== Lesser Antilles ===
Hurricane Elsa passing over Barbados on July 2

==== Barbados ====
Sustained winds of 74 mph (119 km/h) were recorded on Barbados, which was what prompted the operational upgrade of Elsa to a hurricane. Barbados' Minister of Home Affairs, Wilfred Abrahams, reported damage in the southern part of the island, with power outages, along with downed trees, flash flooding and roofs ripped from homes. First responders were unable to reach people, but no injuries or deaths were reported. Elsa was the first hurricane to impact Barbados in 66 years, the previous being Hurricane Janet in 1955. More than 1,300 homes were damaged, including 62 homes which were completely destroyed on the island. The entirety of the island lost electricity as Elsa passed to the south, with 24 electricity poles being knocked down and 74 reports of trees being uprooted. Elsa produced rainfall totals of up to 8 inches (200 mm) in parts of the island. The Queen Elizabeth Hospital sustained damage following the hurricane, with sections of its roof lifted and windows blown out. 20 of the 98 Flow telecommunication sites in Barbados were damaged and were offline. All flights from the Grantley Adams International Airport were suspended on July 3, due to the airport recovering from minor structural damage and power outages. At least 500 electricity pole-related fires were sparked by Elsa, including one in the Grantley Adams International Airport.

==== Saint Lucia and Saint Vincent ====
In Saint Lucia, one man in Fort St. Jacques, Soufrière was killed during Elsa. In the same town, a roof caved in on an elderly couple; both required rescue. Power outages occurred on the island due to trees, branches, and other debris falling on power lines and poles. About 90% percent of all customers on the island lost electricity at some point during the hurricane. Local emergency services received reports of downed trees, branches, and power lines, as well as roof damage. A majority of damage in Saint Lucia occurred in the agricultural sector, especially involving banana crop, incurring a damage total of US$34 million.

In Saint Vincent and the Grenadines, at least 43 homes were seriously damaged, alongside three police stations. Many parts of the island were still recovering from the explosive eruption of La Soufrière earlier in April while much of the island lost electricity and access to clean water following the hurricane. The island country reported extensive losses in livestock and agriculture, with most notable losses in plantain crops, much of which were already destroyed by the volcanic eruption on the island.

==== Other islands ====
On the island of Grenada, the Royal Police Force reported flooding in St. Andrew and St. George parishes due to Elsa. In the capital city of Grenada, St. George's, severe flooding left a road submerged. A 67-year-old man sustained head injuries when a small wind turbine fell on his car in Martinique. Reports of fallen trees and utility poles were received island-wide, with more than 40,000 households losing electricity. Although Trinidad and Tobago was not directly impacted by Elsa, severe weather from the hurricane still affected the nation, which was placed under a yellow-level adverse weather warning by the Trinidad and Tobago Meteorological Service (TTMS). As a result of heavy rainfall, a localized flood alert was also ordered for the islands. The Ministry of Rural Development and Local Government released reports of downed trees and flooding across Port of Spain, Diego Martin, San Juan–Laventille, Sangre Grande, Couva–Tabaquite–Talparo, Mayaro–Rio Claro, and Siparia. The Water and Sewage Authority reported that the torrential rainfall caused turbid rivers and clogging at several water treatment plants in northern Trinidad. As a result, water supply was affected in Arima, El Dorado, Matura, Maracas, Tacarigua, Toco, Saint Joseph, and Valencia. Numerous Caribbean Airlines flights heading to Barbados, Grenada, St. Vincent, and Guyana had to be cancelled due to the inclement weather. During these storms produced by Elsa, more than 1,000 lightning strikes were recorded within an hour. In San Juan–Laventille, a retaining wall collapsed and landslides were reported. Another landslide occurred in Siparia.

=== Greater Antilles ===
==== Dominican Republic and Haiti ====
In the Dominican Republic, strong winds caused by Elsa toppled walls in houses in southwestern Baoruco Province, resulting in two separate fatalities of a 15-year-old boy and 75-year-old woman on July 3. Floods in San Cristóbal Province forced the evacuation of 100 residents. In Santo Domingo, waves of 12–14 feet (3.7–4.3 m) in height washed ashore debris. 16,001 people lost electricity across the Dominican Republic, while 51 homes were damaged by the storm. In San José de Ocoa Province, due to the swelling of the Nizao River, 3 houses were damaged by floods, while the communities of La Estretchura, Monte Negro, and Quitasueño were cut off. In Haiti, damage was relatively limited while Elsa passed close to the Tiburon Peninsula, although there was reported damage to banana and maize crops and to roofs of some structures; there were no other forms of reported significant damage to infrastructure.

==== Jamaica ====
Flash flooding caused by Elsa led to roads being impassable across Saint Catherine and Portmore. Several communities in Kingston, Saint Andrew, Saint Thomas, Saint Catherine, and Clarendon were also flooded. A gully in Clarendon overflowed, causing residents nearby to be stuck in their homes. Several flights at the Sangster International Airport were suspended throughout July 4–5, due to rough weather conditions. Thirteen shelters were opened across the country, with approximately 30 people being sheltered. Over 5 inches (130 mm) of rain fell in at least one location. Preliminary damage was sum up to J$803 million (US$5.36 million).

==== Cayman Islands ====
Although the overall impacts to the Cayman Islands were minor, Elsa brought heavy rains and gusty winds, along with rough seas. This caused some flooding and some power outages across all of the islands. Though some of the impacts were felt across Grand Cayman, most of the impacts were felt across the sister islands of Little Cayman and Cayman Brac.

==== Cuba ====
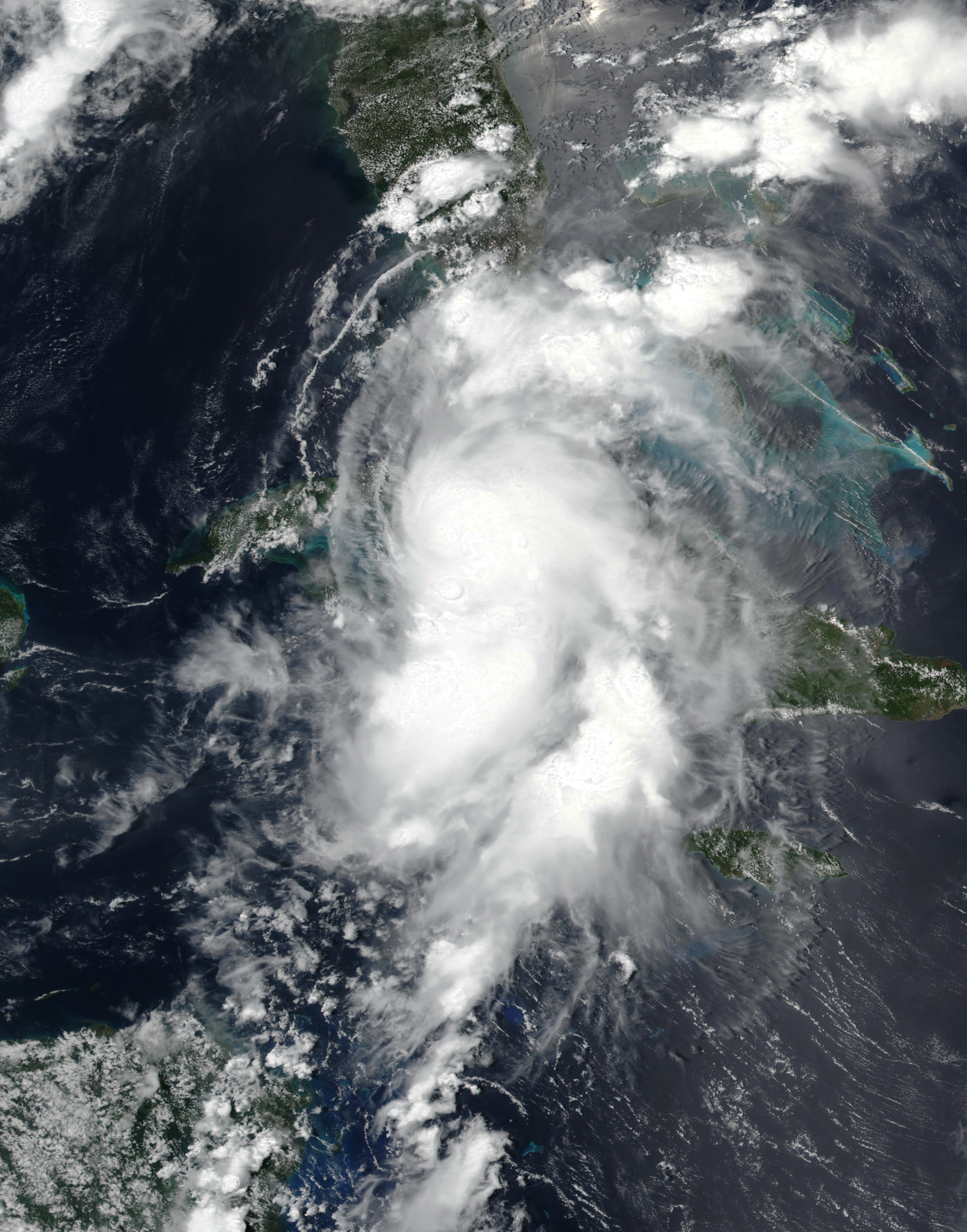
Tropical Storm Elsa shortly after landfall in Cuba on July 5

In Granma Province, the city of Bayamo experienced heavy rain from the outer bands of Elsa. The Municipal Defense Council of Pilón reported damage to agriculture and several homes due to mudslides caused by flooding in the mountains of the province. A dam in Pilón also reportedly overflowed due to the region accumulating 121.6 mm (4.79 in) of rain, according to the National Institute of Hydraulic Resources in Granma. Wind gusts in Cape Cruz exceeded over 62 mph (100 km/h). A 1.5 m (4.9 ft) storm surge battered other parts of Southern Cuba. 11,823 families lost electricity across Eastern Cuba due to the storm. 180,000 people were evacuated across west-central Cuba by July 5 as Elsa approached the western section of the country. By the next day, Elsa had made landfall near the Zapata Swamp in west-central Cuba. In Cienfuegos, residents reported very heavy rainfall alongside flash flooding already occurring hours after landfall. The towns of Jiabcoa, Santa Clara and Arroyo Pretiles were cut off by the flooding of the Jibacoa River caused by Elsa when over 122 mm (4.8 in) of rain fell in 3 hours. 256 mm (10.1 in) fell in the Arroyo Naranjo municipality of Havana.

On July 5, at approximately 24:00 UTC, a boat carrying 22 people, which had departed Cuba capsized in the Florida Straits as Elsa moved into the area. The crew of the Cyprus flagged bulk carrier ship Western Carmen contacted the United States Coast Guard in Key West at approximately 17:30 UTC to report they had found 4 people in the water. The Coast Guard responded and sent out both air and surface assets to scour for survivors, the searches covered about 7,459 square miles (12,148 km) of water for 192 hours. The Coast Guard rescued 5 more victims from the water, but at 02:00 UTC on July 9, the force suspended its search for the remaining 9 passengers, which were later presumed dead.

There was flooding in the municipality of Matanzas due to an overflow of the Yumurí River.

=== United States ===
Widespread impacts were felt throughout the Eastern United States from Elsa. Additionally, the system spawned 18 tornadoes that hit places from Florida to New Jersey between July 6–9. Elsa was responsible for at least $775 million in damages in the United States.

==== Florida ====
Hurricane Elsa paralleling the west coast of Florida on July 6

Elsa's rain bands began to affect Florida at around 18:00 UTC on July 5 while moving over from Cuba. As Elsa passed just west of Tampa Bay, impacts were minimal, aside from downed trees and some flooded roads. Game 5 of the 2021 Stanley Cup Finals was not postponed as the storm moved through. However, a baseball game between the Tampa Bay Rays and Cleveland Indians was postponed. There were reports of downed trees in Taylor County shortly after Elsa made landfall. Rains from Elsa soaked the rubble of the Surfside condo collapse, and lightning forced workers to stop searching for bodies and survivors for two hours early on July 6. On July 7, as the storm passed over the state and into Georgia, a person was killed in Jacksonville when a tree fell and struck two cars. The person was a 26-year-old male Navy Sailor, named Deshawn Levon Johnson. A high-end EF1 tornado also struck the eastern side of Jacksonville, starting in the San Jose neighborhood of the city and travelled all the way to the Phillips Highway area. It caused significant damage to an industrial building as well as some minor to moderate damage residences and trees. At the height of the storm more than 14,000 customers of the JEA were reported without power. Crews quickly stepped in and the amount dwindled soon after. A 2–3 ft (0.61–0.91 m) storm surge was reported in Tampa Bay shortly before 8:00 am EDT, on the morning of July 7. A 1.6 ft (0.49 m) surge was reported at Port Manatee and Clearwater Beach, while Cedar Key saw just over a foot of surge.

In the Florida Keys, Elsa dropped over 4.5 inches (110 mm) of rain at the airport in Key West, and an additional 3.5 inches (89 mm) in Little Torch Key. The highest amount of rainfall from Elsa in the state was recorded at Port Charlotte, with 10.88 inches (276 mm) falling. Key West experienced a 70 mph (115 km/h) wind gust, and Sand Key reported a 64 mph (105 km/h) gust. Roads were flooded on the day Elsa made landfall in the town of Steinhatchee. Elsa impacted animals on Anna Maria Island, where shorebird eggs and chicks were displaced, along with sea turtle nests.

==== Rest of the Southern U.S. ====
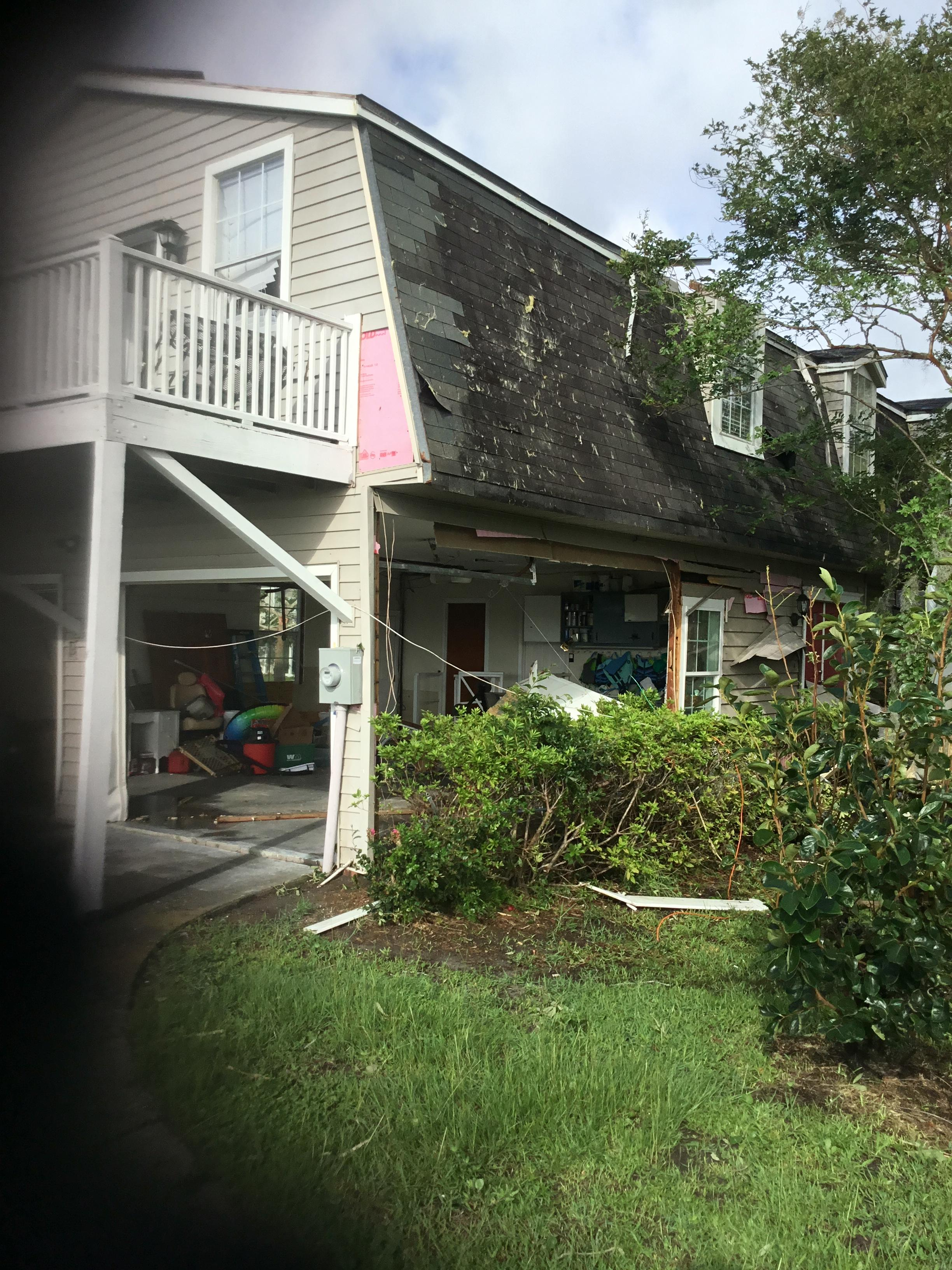
A home in St. Marys, Georgia, that sustained EF1 damage from a tornado spawned by Tropical Storm Elsa.

After passing through northern Florida, the weakened storm moved into Georgia. On July 7, in Camden County, the storm produced an EF1 tornado that struck St. Marys, ripping an exterior wall off of a house before moving through an RV park at Naval Submarine Base Kings Bay. It flipped multiple RVs, including two that were flipped upside down, while throwing another into a nearby lake along with a pickup truck. There were 17 people that were injured, including a pregnant woman. Dirt roads were washed out by flooding in Lowndes County. Multiple trees were downed in Myrtle Beach. The heaviest rainfall total in the state was 8.2 in (210 mm) in Skidaway Island. In Raleigh, North Carolina, up to 5 in (130 mm) fell. Tornadoes also touched down.

==== Northeast ====
Elsa produced hurricane-force wind gusts over the open waters along the Jersey Shore. Continuous heavy rain was produced over the Northeastern states, including New York City and the surrounding area. Central Connecticut to Southeast Maine had experienced torrential rainfall. Rainfall was further enhanced near Interstate 95, due to Elsa interacting with a stalled frontal boundary. Up to 2.27 in (58 mm) of rain fell in New York City during the initial round of thunderstorms, during the late afternoon of July 8. Over an inch and a half fell of rain in just an hour - among the top 10 wettest hourly cloud downpours in the past 80 years for the city. Metro-North Railroad service was suspended locally due to a rain-induced landslide on the tracks in West Haven, Connecticut. Some underpasses and highways flooded; motorists had to be rescued from more than a dozen stalled cars in flood waters on the Major Deegan Expressway in the Bronx near 179th Street. Delays on the George Washington Bridge reached 75 minutes due to the storm. Water poured into several New York City Subway stations, with flooding in Manhattan's 157th Street station and a suspension of the A train from 181st Street to Inwood–207th Street. The heavy rain also forced the New York Mets to postpone a Major League Baseball against the Pittsburgh Pirates. On the morning of July 9, Elsa dropped another 1.5 inches (38 mm) of rain, worsening the problem of flooding. In Maryland, the Delmarva Peninsula, Virginia Beach, Richmond, and Raleigh, up to 5 inches (130 mm) of rain fell.

Wind gusts topped 70 mph (115 km/h) in coastal New Jersey. A 2.1 ft (0.64 m) storm surge was recorded in Atlantic City. Impacts were minimal. Reminiscent of Hurricane Isaias of early August 2020, more than five tornado warnings were in effect at the same time. As the storm came up the East Coast, at least 72 warnings were issued by the NWS, although most of them did not verify. Downed trees and power lines being damaged were reported. Two tornadoes in New Jersey on July 9 were confirmed; an EF1 tornado with 100 mph (160 km/h) winds touched down in Woodbine around 2:40 am EST, and an EF0 tornado with 80 mph (130 km/h) winds touched down in Little Egg Harbor Township around 3:33 am EST. Both tornadoes caused mainly damage to residences, outdoor furniture, and trees. On Long Island, a WeatherFlow site near Jones Beach picked up a 47 mph (76 km/h) wind gust. Calverton saw a wind gust of 64 mph (103 km/h). A tree fell onto subway tracks in Brooklyn, halting train activity, though crews were able to remove it safely by the morning of July 9. The Oyster Bay branch of the Long Island Rail Road was suspended on July 9 due to fallen trees east of Roslyn. Sea Isle City recorded a gust of 79 mph (127 km/h).

In Rhode Island, the Department of Environmental Management warned residents of rip currents even after Elsa became extratropical, due to higher tides. A High Rip Current Risk was placed in effect on July 10 until 8:00 p.m EDT of that day for all south-facing beaches. In Connecticut, rainfall up to 2 in (51 mm) of rain fell, and flooding shut down the Gillette Castle State Park temporarily. The New York City Triathlon, which was supposed to return for the first time since 2018, had to be scaled back to a Duathlon due to Elsa's impacts as tropical storm. The swimming portion of the race was removed due to high levels of bacteria found in the Hudson River. A boat launch recreation area in Barkhamsted had to be closed because of Elsa's flooding. The lake had to be closed until July 11, due to high water levels and concerns for visitor safety.

=== Canada ===
Gusts reached 100 km/h (60 mph) in Cape Breton, Nova Scotia, and reports indicate that the Halifax area had wind gusts of 83 km/h (52 mph). In Prince Edward Island, high winds gusting to 70 km/h (45 mph) have been reported.

In New Brunswick, a cold front brought heavy rain and isolated thunderstorms to parts of the province well ahead of the rain associated with post-tropical storm Elsa. The combined effect of these two systems left 50 to 100 mm (2 to 4 in) of rain across the province, including 92 mm (3.6 in) in Miramichi, 87 mm (3.4 in) in Saint John and 64 mm (2.5 in) in Fredericton, according to the Meteorological Service of Canada, while Prince Edward Island received about 25 to 50 mm (0.98 to 1.97 in) of rain. Elsa then affected the Atlantic Canada provinces of Nova Scotia and New Brunswick, leaving more than 50,000 users without power, as well as heavy rain and wind. In New Brunswick the rain came first with a cold front and then with the extratropical storm itself giving a total up to 92 mm (3.6 in) in Mirimachi. Wind gusts of 85 km/h (55 mph) was reported in Halifax, Nova Scotia as the system passed through.

The same frontal storm, followed by Elsa's remnants, affected Newfoundland's western peninsula, as well as southeastern Labrador, dropping 25 to 75 mm (0 to 5 in) of rain within 36 to 48 hours. The gusts were up to 104 km (65 mi) at Wreckhouse in the southwest, and 50 to 90 km/h (31 to 56 mph) elsewhere in Newfoundland.

Power outages affected at least 50,000 homes in the Maritime provinces, most of them in southwestern New Brunswick.

== Aftermath ==
=== United States ===
==== Florida ====
Duke Energy, the main electric company in the Tampa Bay area, stated that it had about 3,000 employees, contractors, tree specialists and support personnel ready to respond power outages. Additional crews from other states were brought in by Duke. In North Port, floodwaters continued to rise days after Elsa passed the city due to rainwater that soaked more rural northern areas draining down south towards the city. This prompted city and county officials to ask citizens in flood prone areas to consider evacuation. This flooding forced the rescue of several people from floodwaters, after they drove their vehicles into flooded streets. This prompted the State Emergency Response Team of Florida's Region 6 Strike team to return from Surfside, where they had been helping with recovery and clean up efforts following the Surfside condo collapse. Governor Ron DeSantis reported that no serious injuries or fatalities were recorded in the Bay area. He said that damage in the state was "less than what we thought would be reasonable" from "where we looked 72 hours ago". Up to 26,000 customer were without power in the area, most of them in Hillsborough, Pinellas, and Polk counties.

In Lee County, a police Bloodhound dog named Mercy found a missing 12-year-old girl. She was found safe. The dog is a member of the Lee County Sheriff Carmine Marceno's ReUnite program.

==== Northeast ====
National Grid stated that it had over 1,800 personnel on standby for response to any downed power lines, trees, and other emergencies. Over 7,000 were without power in Massachusetts, according to the MEMA. At least 2,500 in Connecticut experienced power outages, with 20,000 to 40,000 expected statewide. New Jersey Governor Phil Murphy said Elsa was "not as bad as we feared", but stressed that it "won't be the last of this season."

== See also ==
- Weather of 2021
- Tropical cyclones in 2021
- Timeline of the 2021 Atlantic hurricane season
- List of Category 1 Atlantic hurricanes
- List of costliest Atlantic hurricanes
- Hurricane Charley (2004) – A Category 4 hurricane that affected similar areas
- Hurricane Dennis (2005) – A Category 4 hurricane that took a similar path and affected similar areas
- Hurricane Ernesto (2006) – A Category 1 hurricane that also affected Cuba
- Hurricane Isaias (2020) – Another early-season Category 1 hurricane that affected similar areas
- Tropical Storm Fred (2021) – Took a similar track a month later
- Hurricane Debby (2024) - A Category 1 hurricane that affected the same region
