= Norma Cox Astwood =

Bermudian clinical psychologist

Norma Cox Astwood OBE
- Born: Norma Alice Cox; Bermuda
- Other names: Lady Blackman; Norma A. Astwood; Norma Alice Astwood
- Occupations: Licensed psychologist; Politician
- Spouses: Leonard Leroy Astwood (1926–1981); Frank Blackman (m. 1995)

Norma Alice Cox, known as Norma Cox Astwood or Lady Blackman, OBE, is a Bermudian clinical psychologist. She was the first woman to serve as vice president of the Senate of Bermuda. Between 1987 and 1996, she served as an independent senator in Bermuda and was the founder in 1989 of the Commonwealth Women Parliamentarians Group.

== Biography ==
Norma Alice Cox was born in Bermuda to Gilbert and Constance Cox and grew up in Bermuda. Cox was a student of the Berkeley Institute and after her graduation she taught at Central School. In 1951, she enrolled at what was known as Hamilton Normal School, a training college for teachers located in Hamilton, Ontario. After completing her degree, she returned to teaching at Central School, taking summer courses offered in Bermuda by Queen's University courses to complete her education. On 11 April 1955, in Hamilton, Bermuda, Cox married Leonard Leroy Astwood. Cox-Astwood obtained a BA in psychology and literature from Queen's University and upon graduation enrolled at the University of Birmingham, where she earned a diploma in the psychology of childhood

== Career ==
After completing her basic tertiary education, Astwood taught English literature and mathematics at the Robert Crawford School and Prospect Girls School. In 1970, she enrolled for postgraduate study at Adelphi University in Garden City, New York, to pursue a doctoral degree in clinical psychology, subsequently completing her internship as a clinical fellow in psychology at Harvard University Medical School from 1973 and 1974. Between 1974 and 1982, Astwood served the Bermuda Department of Education, as psychologist to schools. She then became the director of social services in the Ministry of Health and Social Services.

In 1987, Astwood was appointed as an independent senator and the following year became the first woman vice president of the Bermudian Senate. In 1989, while she was attending the 35th Commonwealth Parliamentary Conference held in Barbados, Astwood coordinated a women's caucus, which would become the Commonwealth Women Parliamentarians (CWP). For the first two years of the organization, Astwood served as coordinator keeping the momentum going until the group was formally organized in 1992, with the goal of increasing the number of women involved in politics throughout the Commonwealth of Nations. On 19 August, 1995, Astwood married Sir Frank Blackman, a Barbadian secretary to the Cabinet and the island's first ombudsman, on the patio of her home in Hamilton Parish and resigned her senate vice presidency about a year thereafter.

She was presented with the Order of the British Empire in 1996 and honored as a "community hero" in Bermuda in 2015. She lives in Barbados and works as a consultant with the Caribbean Dyslexia Centre.
