= Andre Worrell =

Barbadian politician

Member of the Senate of Barbados
- Incumbent
- Assumed office 30 August 2024
- Prime Minister: Mia Mottley

Personal details
- Party: Democratic Labour Party

Andre Worrell is a Barbadian politician from the Democratic Labour Party who is an opposition member of the Senate of Barbados. He replaced Tricia Watson.
