= Christ Church East (Barbados Parliament constituency) =

Parliamentary constituency in Barbados

Christ Church East is a constituency in the Christ Church area of Barbados represented in the House of Assembly of the Barbadian Parliament since 2018 by Wilfred Abrahams MP of the Barbados Labour Party. (Note: As with all constituencies, the constituency elects one Member of Parliament (MP) by the first past the post system of election at least every five years.)

Since its founding in 1971 it has been a marginal constituency between the BLP and the DLP.

== Boundaries ==
From a point on the sea coast south of the terminus of the School Hill-St Christopher Road in a straight line to the terminus of the School Hill-St Christopher Road; thence in a northerly direction along the middle of the School Hill-St Christopher Road to its junction with Sayes Court-Hopewell Road; thence along the middle of Sayes Court-Hopewell Road to its junction with Highway U (the Hopewell-Chancery Lane Road); thence in a westerly direction along the middle of Highway U to its junction with Waverley Road: thence in a northerly direction along the middle of Waverley Road to its junction with Pegwell Boggs Road; thence in an easterly direction along the middle of Pegwell Boggs Road to its junction with Pegwell Boggs New Road; thence in a northerly direction along the middle of Pegwell Boggs New Road to its junction with Gibbons Road; thence in a westerly direction along the middle of Gibbons Road to its junction with Highway 7 (the Oistins-Airport Road); thence in a north easterly direction along Highway 7 to its junction with Highway S (the Providence-Balls Road); thence in northerly direction along the middle of Highway S to its junction with the ABC Highway; thence in a south westerly direction along the middle of the ABC Highway to its junction with Highway 6 at the Henry Forde Round-a-bout; thence in an easterly direction along the middle of Highway 6 (the Balls-St. Patricks Road) to its junction with Highway Q (the Balls-Lower Greys Road); thence in a north easterly direction along the middle of Highway Q to its junction with Highway R (the Pilgrim-Ridge Road); thence in a southerly direction along the middle of Highway R to its junction with the ABC Highway; thence in an easterly direction along the middle of the ABC Highway to a point near light pole #499; thence in a southerly direction with a straight line to its junction with the Fairy Valley Road; thence in an easterly direction along the middle of the Fairy Valley Road to its junction with the Seawell House-Paragon Road; thence along the middle of the Seawell House-Paragon Road to a straight line leading to a point on the Sea Coast south of Paragon House; thence in a westerly direction along the sea coast to a point on the coast south of the terminus of the School Hill-St. Christopher Road (the starting point).

== History ==
=== Members of Parliament ===
Election	Member	Party
1971	Cuthbert Edwy Talma	DLP
1976	Richard Cheltenham	BLP
1981	Richard Cheltenham	BLP
1986	Edgar Bourne	DLP
1991	Tyrone Estwick	DLP
1994	Wendell Callender	BLP
1999	Reginald Farley	BLP
2003	Reginald Farley	BLP
2008	Dennis Lowe	DLP
2013	Dennis Lowe	DLP
2018	Wilfred Abrahams	BLP
2022	Wilfred Abrahams	BLP
2026	Wilfred Abrahams	BLP
