= Saint Michael West (Barbados Parliament constituency) =

Parliamentary constituency in Barbados

- Constituency for the House of Assembly of Barbados
- Region: Saint Michael, Barbados

Current constituency
- Created: 1971

Saint Michael West is a constituency in the Saint Michael parish of Barbados. It was established in 1971. Since 2022, it has been represented in the House of Assembly of the Barbadian Parliament by Christopher Gibbs, a member of the BLP. (Note: As with all constituencies, the constituency elects one member of parliament (MP) by the first past the post system of election at least every five years.) The Saint Michael West constituency is a safe seat for the BLP.

== Boundaries ==
The constituency runs:

From a point on the western sea coast west of the junction of Spring Garden Highway with Brandons Road in a straight line to Brandons Road; thence along the middle of Brandons Road to its junction with Lower Westbury Road and Lower Deacons Road; thence in a northerly and then in a north easterly direction along the middle of Lower Deacons Road to its junction with Goodland Cross Road; thence in a south easterly direction along the middle of Goodland Cross Road to its junction with Bridge Gap; thence in a north easterly direction along the middle of Bridge Gap to its junction with Highway 1 (the Eagle Hall-Holetown Road); thence in a south easterly direction along the middle of Highway 1 to its junction with Tudor Bridge and Bank Hall Cross Road; thence in a south easterly direction along the middle of Bank Hall Cross Road to its junction with Bridge Road and Hindsbury Road; thence in a southerly direction along the middle of Hindsbury Road to its junction with Roebuck Street at the James A. Tudor Roundabout; thence in a westerly direction along the middle of Roebuck Street to its junction with Country Road; thence in a north westerly direction along the middle of Country Road to its junction with Whitepark and Passage Road; thence in a south westerly direction along the middle of Passage Road to its junction with Baxters and Westbury Road; thence in a north westerly direction along the middle of Westbury Road to the junction of President Kennedy Drive; thence in a south westerly direction along the middle of President Kennedy Drive to its junction with Prescod Boulevard and University Row at the Elsie Payne Roundabout; thence in a northerly direction to the sea coast; thence in a northerly direction along the sea coast to a point on the coast west of the junction of Spring Garden Highway with Brandons Road in a straight line to Brandons Road (the starting point)..

== Members ==
Election	Member	Party
1994	Branford Taitt	DLP
1999	Joseph Atherley	BLP
2003	Joseph Atherley	BLP
2008	Michael A. Carrington	DLP
2013	Michael A. Carrington	DLP
2018	Joseph Atherley	BLP
2022	Christopher Gibbs	BLP
2026	Christopher Gibbs	BLP

== Elections ==
=== 2022 ===
St. Michael West
Party	Candidate	Votes	%	±%
BLP	Christopher Gibbs	2,434	80.1	+3.3
DLP	Ricardo Williams	439	14.5	−5.5
APP	Patsie Nurse	122	4.0	+2.9
SB	Victorine Wilson	44	1.5	+0.2
Majority		1,995	65.6	+8.8
Turnout		3,039		
BLP hold		Swing	+4.4	

=== 2018 ===
St. Michael West
Party	Candidate	Votes	%	±%
BLP	Joseph Atherley	3,214	76.8	+28.3
DLP	Michael Carrington	838	20.0	−31.4
SB	Lana Toussaint	55	1.3	new
UPP	Patsie Nurse	45	1.1	new
Barbados Integrity Movement	Neil Holder	32	0.8	new
Majority		2,376	56.8	+53.9
Turnout		4,184		
BLP gain from DLP		Swing	+29.8	
