= John Andrew King =

Barbadian politician

Senator in the Senate of Barbados
- Incumbent
- Assumed office January 2022
- Prime Minister: Mia Mottley

Member of House of Assembly of Barbados
- In office January 2018 – January 2021

Minister of the Creative Economy, Culture, and Sports
- In office 27 May 2018 – 26 May 2021

Personal details
- Born: 10 May 1964 (age 61)

John Andrew King (born 10 May 1964 in Birmingham, England) is a Barbadian politician and entertainer. He currently serves as a senator in the Senate of Barbados since January 2022. He has also served as a Member of Parliament for St Philip West.

== Early life and education ==
John Andrew King was born on 10 May 1964 in Birmingham to Barbadian parents. He attended Ebenezer primary school. After his primary education, he obtained a degree in Social Work from the University of the West Indies.

== Musical career ==
King has had a long career as a singer, primarily in the calypso and soca genres. He made his singing debut at Crop Over in 1985, initially using the stage name Johnny Ma Boy. He is a two-time Barbados Calypso Monarch and has released six solo albums, he won the Caribbean Song Contest which was held in Trinidad and Tobago in 1992 with "Hold You In A Song" which he did with Alison Hinds https://www.caribbean-beat.com/issue-47/standing-for-something King has also written songs for other artists and bands, including Atlantik.

== Political career ==
During the 2018 Barbadian general election, King ran for the House of Assembly of Barbados and was elected. He was elected through the Barbados Labour Party replacing David Estwick who was a Minister of Agriculture. In May 2018, he was appointed Minister of Creative Economy, Culture, and Sports in the Mia Mottley administration.

== Honors ==
- Barbados Service Medal
