= Crystal Haynes =

Barbadian politician

Member of the Senate of Barbados
- In office May 2018 – December 2021
- Prime Minister: Mia Mottley

Member of the Senate of Barbados
- Incumbent
- Assumed office January 2022

Personal details
- Party: Barbados Labour Party

Crystal Kathy Melissa Haynes is a Barbadian politician and medical doctor who has been a member of the Senate of Barbados since May 2018 and January 2022 respectively. She is a member of the First senate of Barbados constituted after Barbados became a republic by Prime Minister Mia Mottley. She is a member of the Barbados Labour Party.
