= Christopher Maynard (politician) =

Barbadian politician

Member of the Senate of Barbados
- Incumbent
- Assumed office 1 February 2022
- Prime Minister: Mia Mottley

Personal details
- Party: Independent

Christopher Maynard is a Barbadian politician who is an opposition member of the Senate of Barbados. He is a surgeon by profession.
