= Pat Parris (politician) =

Barbadian politician

Member of the Senate of Barbados
- Incumbent
- Assumed office May 2018
- Prime Minister: Mia Mottley

Personal details
- Party: Barbados Labour Party

Patricia (Pat) Parris is a Barbadian politician who is a member of the Senate of Barbados. In 2022, she was appointed chief executive officer of the Barbados Labour Party (BLP).
