= Tricia Watson =

Barbadian politician

Member of the Senate of Barbados
- In office 13 February 2024 – 30 August 2024
- Prime Minister: Mia Mottley

Personal details
- Party: Independent
- Other political affiliations: Democratic Labour Party (until 2024)

Tricia Watson is a Barbadian politician who was an opposition member of the Senate of Barbados. She is an attorney by profession.

On 30 August 2024 she resigned from the Democratic Labour Party and the senate. She was replaced by political scientist Devaron Bruce.
