= Kevin Boyce (Barbadian politician) =

Barbadian politician

Member of the Senate of Barbados
- Incumbent
- Assumed office 1 February 2022
- Prime Minister: Mia Mottley

Personal details
- Party: Independent

Kevin Boyce is a Barbadian politician who is an opposition member of the Senate of Barbados. Boyce graduated from University of the West Indies at Cave Hill and Hugh Wooding Law School in Trinidad and Tobago.
