= Branford Taitt =

Barbadian politician

Sir Branford Mayhew Taitt KA

President of the Senate of Barbados
- In office 2008 – February 2012
- Prime Minister: David Thompson; Freundel Stuart
- Preceded by: Fred Gollop
- Succeeded by: Kerryann Ifill

Personal details
- Born: May 15, 1938 Black Rock, Barbados
- Died: February 15, 2013 (aged 74)

Sir Branford Mayhew Taitt, KA (May 15, 1938 – February 15, 2013) was a Barbadian politician who served as a cabinet minister and former President of the Senate of Barbados. He served as Minister of Trade, Industry and Commerce from 1971 to 1976, Minister of Tourism and Industry from 1986 to 1987, Minister of Health from 1987 to 1993, and Minister of Foreign Affairs from 1993 to 1994. Taitt was the longest serving Minister of Health in the country's history.

Taitt was born in 1938 on Fairfield Road in Black Rock, Saint Michael, Barbados. He was the youngest of the five children of Clair Rollock and Elma Taitt-Rollock. He attended Wesley Hall Boys' School and Combermere School. Taitt later obtained a BA degree cum laude from Brooklyn College and a master's degree in public administration from New York University.

He was made a Knight of St Andrew (KA) by the Barbadian government in 2010.
