= Douglas Lynch (businessman) =

Sir Douglas Lynch, KA, CMG, QC (1926 – 12 April 2016) was a Barbadian retired businessman and lawyer, former member of the Privy Council of Barbados and a director of the Central Bank of Barbados.

Sir Douglas was the first person to be formally admitted to the party, and himself stood for election, but was defeated in his first and sole attempt to gain political office, but remained a powerful background figure in the Democratic Labour Party with Barrow rarely making any decisions on business or financial without consulting him.

Among many posts held in the private sector he was also a director, and vice-chairman, of the island's largest insurance company, the Barbados Mutual Life Assurance Society (known by all locally as simply "The Mutual").

Sir Douglas joined The Barbados Shipping and Trading Company - the country's largest company, being the holding company for the six next largest companies in the country - as a Director, and as a regular part-time student of business at MIT was instrumental in choosing and setting up their first mainframe computer - which used a card-reading machine for input.

In time, Sir Douglas rose to become Joint Managing Director of BS&T, followed by promotion to Chairman and then Chairman and Joint Managing Director upon the retirement of his predecessor. He died in Barbados in April 2016.
