= List of presidents of the Legislative Council of Barbados =

List of presidents of the Legislative Council of Barbados.

Name	Entered office	Left office
John Brathwaite	1813	
John S. Gaskin	1835	
Grant E. Thomas	1847	
Sir T. Graham Briggs. Bart.	1876	
Sir George C. Pile	1882	
W.P. Leacock	1906	
Sir W.K. Chandler	1912	
Sir J.R. Philis, O.B.E.	1928	
Sir G.L. Pile, C.B.E.	1938	
Sir John Hutson, O.B.E., V.D., M.B. C.M., D.H.P.	1942	
S.C. Thorne	1944	
Sir D.C. Leacock	1947	
Sir J.D Chandler	1950	
Sir H.A. Cuke, C.B.E.	1956	
Sir H.G. Massiah, C.B.E., M.B., C.M.	1956	1963

This position was succeeded by the President of the Senate of Barbados.

== Sources ==
- Official website of the Parliament of Barbados

== See also ==
- List of current presidents of assembly
