= Maurice King (lawyer) =

Barbadian politician (1936–2021)

Sir Maurice Athelstan King, KA, QC (1 January 1936 – 21 September 2021) was a Barbadian lawyer.

== Career ==
In the late 1970s, King served as Permanent Representative of Barbados to the United Nations, as well as a legal counsel for the Democratic Labour Party. He served as Attorney-General of Barbados from 1986 to 1989. He then went on to head the Ministry of Foreign Affairs, Foreign Trade and International Business from 1989 to 1993.

== Personal life ==
King did his secondary education at Harrison College. He graduated from University of Manchester in 1960 and was called to the bar that year. He was knighted in 2009. He has a brother, Edmund King, also a lawyer.

He died on 21 September 2021, at the age of 85.

Knight of Saint Andrew - 2009

The University of Manchester 1957 – 1960 Degree Name: LLB Field Of Study: Law
