= Andwele Boyce =

Barbadian politician

Andwell Boyce

Personal details
- Education: University Of The West Indies

Andwele Boyce is a Barbadian politician who is serving as a member of the Senate of Barbados. Mr.Boyce was appointed a Government Senator by the Barbados Labour Party led by Prime Minister Mia Motley.
