= Andrew Mallalieu =

Barbadian politician

Member of the Senate of Barbados
- Incumbent
- Assumed office 1 February 2022
- Prime Minister: Mia Mottley

Personal details
- Party: Independent

Andrew Mallalieu is a Barbadian politician who is an opposition member of the Senate of Barbados. He is a Chartered Accountant and a Fellow of the Royal Institution of Chartered Surveyors.
