= Kristina Hinds =

Barbadian politician

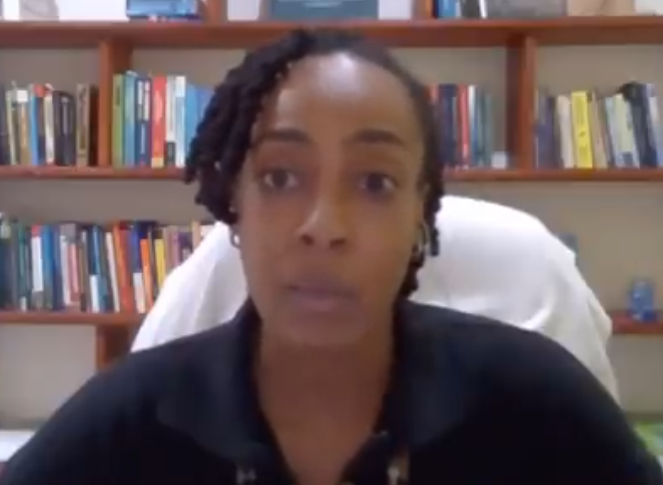
- In an online discussion in 2022

Member of the Senate of Barbados
- In office 8 April 2022 – 13 February 2024

Personal details
- Party: Independent

Kristina Hinds is a Barbadian academic and politician who was an opposition member of the Senate of Barbados. She joined the Faculty of Social Sciences University of the West Indies at Cave Hill Campus in 2007 under the Department of Government, Sociology and Social Work as a Temporary Assistant Lecturer in Political Science.
