= Frank Blackman =

Barbadian civil servant (1926–2023)

Sir Frank Milton Blackman KA, KCVO, OBE (31 July 1926 – 20 April 2023) was a Barbadian civil servant.

Blackman was born in Bridgetown, Barbados, on 31 July 1926, and joined the Colonial Secretary's Office as a clerk in 1946. He was promoted to Assistant Secretary in 1957 and then served as Clerk of the Legislative Council between 1958 and 1964, Cabinet Secretary from 1966 to 1986 (including service as Head of the Civil Service for the last five years) and as Ombudsman for Barbados from 1987 to 1993.

Blackman received a number of state honours. He was appointed a Member of the Order of the British Empire in 1964 and promoted to Officer four years later. In March 1975, he was also appointed a Commander of the Royal Victorian Order and then promoted to Knight Commander in October 1985 to mark Queen Elizabeth II's visit to the Caribbean. He was also made a Knight of St Andrew by the Governor-General of Barbados in 1985.

Blackman died on 20 April 2023, at the age of 96.
