= Charles Morris (Barbadian politician) =

Barbadian politician

Member of the Senate of Barbados
- Incumbent
- Assumed office 8 January 2024
- Prime Minister: Mia Mottley

Personal details
- Party: Barbados Labour Party

Charles M. Morris is a Barbadian politician who is a member of the Senate of Barbados for the Barbados Labour Party (BLP). Morris was appointed in 2024. He is a reverend at the St. Peter Parish Church.
