= Olga Lopes-Seale =

Guyanese radio personality and activist

Dame Olga Lopes-Seale, DA, MBE
- Born: Olga Lopes; 26 December 1918; British Guiana (now Guyana)
- Died: 4 February 2011 (aged 92); Bridgetown, Barbados
- Occupation: radio broadcaster
- Spouse: Dick Seale

Dame Olga Lopes-Seale DA MBE, (26 December 1918 – 4 February 2011) was a Guyanese-born Barbados-based social and community worker, radio broadcaster and singer.

== Life ==
Born in British Guiana as Olga Lopes, she was born to Portuguese Guyanese indentured laborers. She sang and played mandolin and had performed in Guyana and Barbados before becoming a broadcaster for Radio Demerara (where she acquired the nickname "Auntie Olga"). In 1960, she started the Radio Needy Children's Fund. She married Barbadian Dick Seale, moving to Barbados in 1963 where she continued her radio and charity work.

In Barbados, she worked for the Barbados Rediffusion Services Limited (now Starcom Network), and was active in community work. In the 1940s and 1950s she was known as "the Vera Lynn of the Caribbean". She discovered Red Plastic Bag (a Barbadian calypsonian) and convinced Rediffusion to provide a studio for recording, launching his career. She was also involved in the creation of the Barbadian national anthem.

== Death ==
On 9 December 2010, Lopes-Seale fell at her home and broke her hip, suffering multiple fractures, leaving her unable to continue her charity work for the Needy Children's Fund.

She died on 4 February 2011, aged 92 at the Queen Elizabeth Hospital in Bridgetown, Barbados.

== Honors ==
Lopes-Seale had been honoured for her work throughout the Caribbean:

- 1961 Member of the Order of the British Empire
- 1997 Inducted into the Caribbean Broadcasting Hall of Fame (in Suriname)
- 2002 Honoured by the government of Guyana as one of 11 Guyanese Barbadians for outstanding contributions
- 2005 Dame of the Order of St. Andrew (Barbados)
- 2010 Inducted into the Barbados Association of Journalists' Hall of Fame
- 2010 Theatre Guild of Guyana presented 'O' is for Olga, in tribute to the first female broadcaster in both Guyana and the Caribbean.
