= Richard Cheltenham =

Barbadian politician

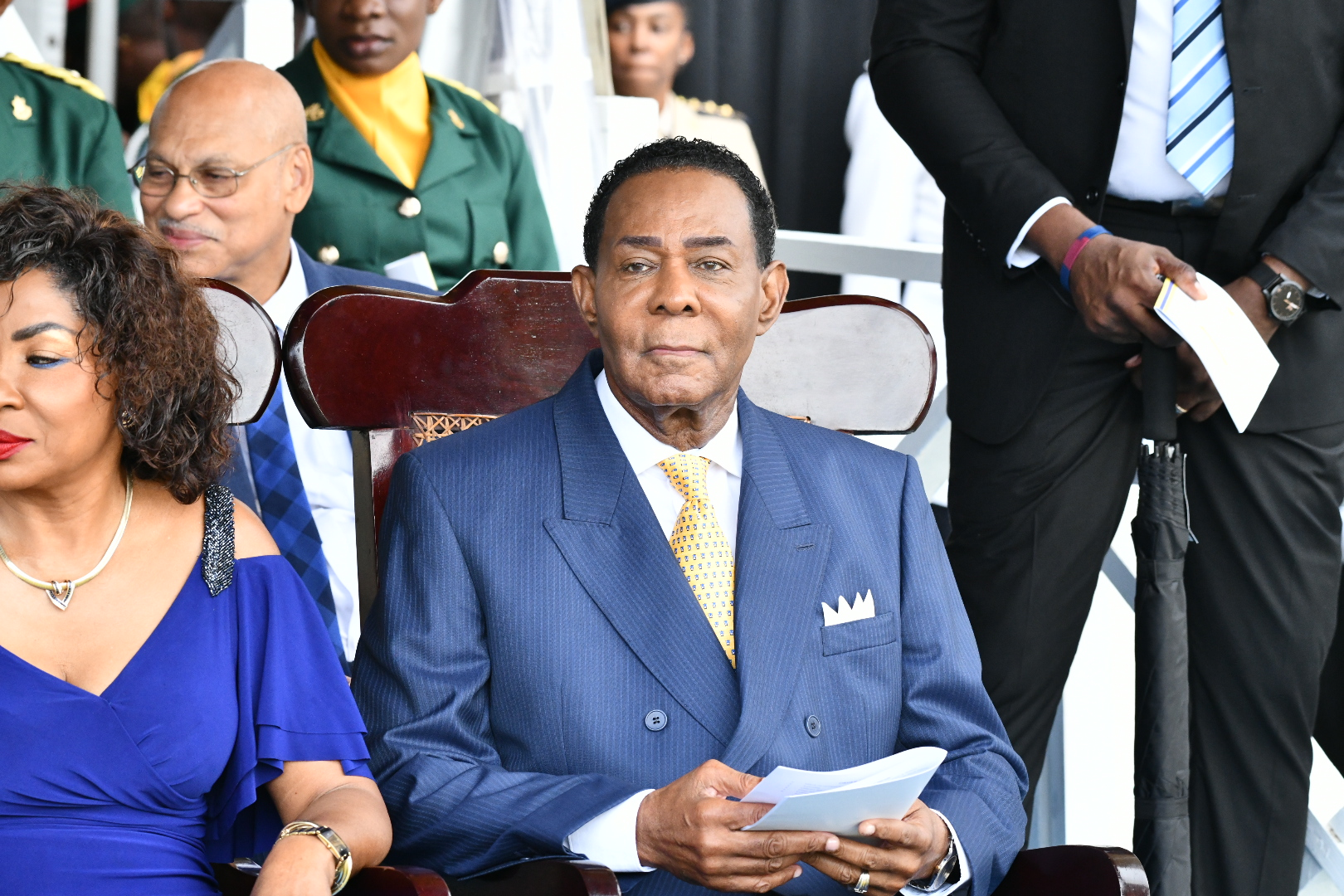

President of the Senate of Barbados
- In office 5 June 2018 – 15 September 2020
- Prime Minister: Mia Mottley
- Preceded by: Kerryann Ifill
- Succeeded by: Reginald Farley

Personal details
- Born: 20 December 1941 (age 84)

Sir Richard Lionel Cheltenham (born 20 December 1941) is a Barbadian politician. He was President of the Senate of Barbados from 2018 to 2020. He presently serves as the Chairman of the Parliamentary Reform Commission, appointed to enquire into the parliamentary system of government of Barbados and make recommendations for its reform.

== Political career ==
Cheltenham was the Member of Parliament for Christ Church East from 1976 to 1981.

== Education ==
- University of the West Indies
- McGill University
- Manchester University
