= Chelston Brathwaite =

Barbadian politician

Member of the Senate of Barbados
- In office 8 April 2022 – 13 February 2024

Chelston Brathwaite is a Barbadian politician who was an opposition member of the Senate of Barbados. He is an agricultural scientist and former director general of the Inter-American Institute for Cooperation on Agriculture (IICA).
