= John Rogers (Barbadian politician) =

Barbadian politician

Member of the Senate of Barbados
- Incumbent
- Assumed office 19 February 2026
- Prime Minister: Mia Mottley

Personal details
- Party: Independent

John Rogers is a Barbadian politician who is an opposition member of the Senate of Barbados. He is a reverend by profession. He is Rector of the St. George Parish Church.
