= Fred Gollop =

Barbadian politician and attorney (died 2018)

President of the Senate of Barbados
- In office 1994–2008
- Prime Minister: Owen Arthur
- Preceded by: Marcus deLambert Jordan
- Succeeded by: Branford Taitt

Personal details
- Died: June 2018

Sir Fred Winlyn Gollop was a politician and attorney from Barbados.

== Career ==
He practised law in Barbados for over 40 years. He also held various leadership positions in regional banks, such as Central Bank of Barbados, Barbados Development Bank and First Caribbean International Bank.

He became President of the Senate of Barbados in 1994 and served in that capacity for 14 years. In 1996 he received the highest honour in Barbados, Knight of St. Andrew. In 2006 he was appointed Queen's Counsel.

He died in 2018, at the age of 78 years.
