= Roshan =

Roshan may refer to:

== People ==
- Roshan (music director) (1917–1967), Indian musician and music director, born Roshan Lal Nagrath
- Hrithik Roshan (born 1974), Hindi film actor, son of Rakesh Roshan
- Mostafa Ahmadi-Roshan (1980–2012), Iranian nuclear scientist
- Pir Roshan (1525 – c. 1580), Pashtun warrior and poet
- Rajesh Roshan (born 1955), Bollywood music director
- Rakesh Roshan (born 1949), Indian producer, director and former actor in Bollywood films
- Roshan Cools (born 1975), Dutch neuroscientist
- Roshan Jhummun, Mauritian politician
- Roshan Mahanama (born 1966), Sri Lankan cricketer
- Roshan Meka, Indian actor in Telugu films
- Roshan Ranawana (born 1981), Sri Lankan actor
- Roshan Ravindra, Sri Lankan actor
- Roshan Seth (born 1942), British-Indian actor
- Roshan Singh (1892–1927), Indian revolutionary

== Other uses ==
- Roshan (telecommunications), Afghan telecommunications provider
- Rushani language, language spoken in Afghanistan and Tajikistan; sometimes spelled "Roshani"
- Rushon District, district in Tajikistan; sometimes spelled "Roshan"
- Afghan Premier League, the top football league in Afghanistan, also known as Roshan Afghan Premier League due to sponsorship
- Roshan, a boss creature in the video game, Dota 2
- Roshan, a character from Ice Age
