= Wilfred Abrahams =

Barbadian politician

Wilfred Arthur Abrahams is a Barbadian politician, lawyer and current government minister in Barbados. He is the current Attorney General in Barbados.

== Early life and education ==
Wilfred Abrahams was born in Christ Church East. He attended the St Giles Boys School. After his primary education he studied at the University of the West Indies at Cave Hill where he studied Law and obtained his BSc in Law. He also enrolled to the Hugh Wooding Law School in Trinidad and Tobago.

== Career ==
After this education, Abrahams started his career as an attorney handling Civil Litigation and Commercial law at his firm. He served as the president of Barbadian Bar Association where he was the youngest elected president. He sits on the Board of Trustees of the Caribbean Court of Justice Trust Fund. In the 2013 general elections of Barbados, he ran for Member of Parliament representing Christ Church East as a member of the Barbados Labour Party but lost to Denis Lowe. In 2018, he was elected Member of Parliament after defeating Denis Lowe and was re-elected in 2022.

He was subsequently appointed Minister of Energy and Water Resources in the Mia Mottley Administration. In January 2022, he was reassigned a Ministerial portfolio as the Minister of Home Affairs and Information. In 2026, Abrahams became Barbados' newest Attorney General.
