= Roshanna Trim =

Barbadian politician

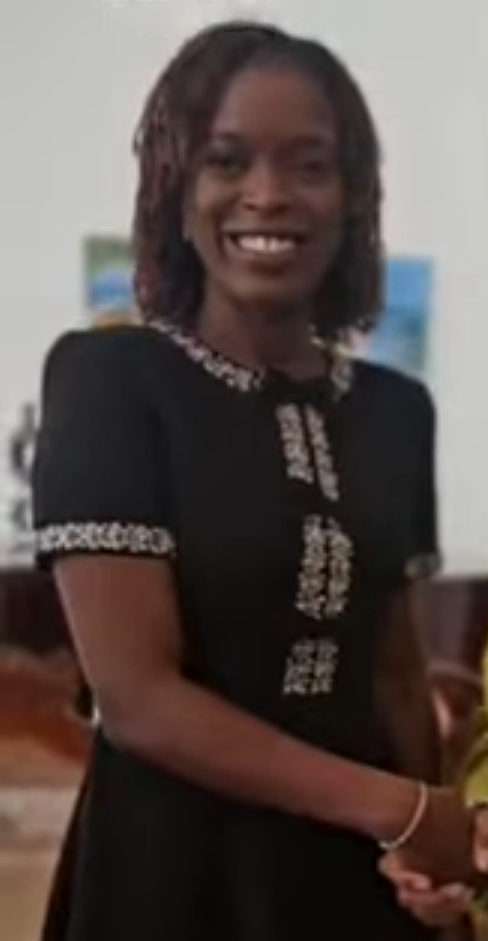
- Being sworn in as a senator in 2025

Member of the Senate of Barbados
- Incumbent
- Assumed office 27 June 2025
- Prime Minister: Mia Mottley

Personal details
- Born: 1995 (age 30–31)
- Party: Barbados Labour Party

Roshanna Trim (born 1995) is a Barbadian politician who is a member of the Senate of Barbados for the Barbados Labour Party (BLP). Trim is a social activist and trade unionist.

Trim began her political involvement at 14, and has held roles in the Youth Parliament, the Pink Parliament, and various other political organisations.
