= Reginald Farley =

Barbadian politician

The Most Honourable Reginald Farley FB

President of the Senate of Barbados
- Incumbent
- Assumed office 15 September 2020
- Prime Minister: Mia Mottley
- Preceded by: Richard Cheltenham

Personal details
- Born: 1961 (age 64–65)

Reginald Farley (born 26 June 1961) in Christ Church, Barbados, is a Barbadian politician and accountant who has served has President of the senate of Barbados since 2020. He is also the first senate president after Barbados became a republic.
