= Senate of Barbados =

Upper house of the Parliament of Barbados

Type
- Type: Upper house

Leadership
- President of the Senate: Reginald Farley, BLP since 15 September 2020
- Deputy President: H. Elizabeth Thompson, BLP since 4 February 2022
- Leader of Government Business: Lisa Cummins, BLP

Structure
- Seats: 21
- Political groups: Government: BLP (12); Opposition: Independents (7); DLP (1); FOD (1)

Elections
- Voting system: Appointed by the President

Meeting place
- Senate of Barbados chamber Bridgetown, St. Michael, Barbados

Website
- The Senate

The Senate of Barbados is the upper house of the bicameral Parliament of Barbados. The Senate is accorded legitimacy by Chapter V of the Constitution of Barbados. It is the smaller of the two chambers. The Senate was established in 1964 to replace a prior body known as the Legislative Council. Besides creating and reviewing Barbadian legislation, the Senate generally reviews approved legislation originating from the House of Assembly (Lower House). One main constraint on the Senate is that it cannot author monetary or budget-related bills. Most of the non-political appointees to the Senate have been selected by the President of Barbados, from civil society organisations, labour collectives and public associations in Barbados. Prior to Barbados becoming a republic on the 30 November 2021, these functions were performed by the Governor-General, who was the viceroy of the Monarchy of Barbados which has since been abolished.

According to the Constitution of Barbados, 7 are chosen at the President's sole discretion, 12 on the advice of the Prime Minister and 2 on the advice of the Leader of the Opposition. In the absence of an opposition leader, the president appoints 2 extra senators bringing the total amount of independents to 9. The Senate sits for 20 to 25 days a year. The term of the Senate, and the House of Assembly, is five years; both chambers are dissolved before each election.

== Composition ==
All 21 Barbadian Senators are formally appointed by the President, but this duty, as most of the President's duties, is carried out on the advice of other people. The President appoints 12 Senators on the advice of the Prime Minister and two on the advice of the Leader of the Opposition. This means that the Prime Minister effectively gets to appoint 12 Senators and the Leader of the Opposition effectively gets to appoint 2. The remaining seven Senators are nominated by the President at their discretion (that is, the President is not bound by other political leaders' advice in these appointments) to represent various religious, social, economic, or other interests in Barbados. In the absence of an opposition leader in parliament (i.e. in the case of a landslide victory where one party takes all 30 seats in the House of Assembly, as occurred in 2018 and 2022) the president will then appoint the remaining two senators in the opposition's stead allowing for 9 independents instead. This occurred again in the 2026 Barbadian general election where the President instead appointed opposition senators from the parties that came in 2nd and 3rd place.

Potential Senators must meet certain criteria before they can be nominated to the upper chamber. In order to be eligible for appointment, a person must be a Barbadian citizen of at least 21 years of age who has resided in the country for the past twelve months. A person is ineligible for appointment if they are in bankruptcy, have a mental illness, hold an allegiance to a foreign state, have a capital punishment sentence, have been in prison for a time exceeding six months, or have been convicted of a crime involving electoral fraud, treason, or other dishonourable acts. Furthermore, a Senator cannot also serve as a civil servant, a member of the armed forces or police, a judge, a public prosecutor, a controller, or a current sitting member of the House of Assembly. Senators serve for five years.

== Powers ==
Both the Senate and the House of Assembly constitutionally share most of the same powers, however, much as in other Westminster System Parliaments, the lower house is dominant. All legislation can be introduced and amended in either house with the exception of money bills; money bills always originate in the House of Assembly, and the Senate is limited in the amendments it can make to them. If the budget is approved by the House of Assembly, but it is not approved un-amended by the Senate within one month, it can be directly submitted to the President. If regular legislation is approved by the House of Assembly twice in two consecutive sessions, but is not approved of by the Senate either time, it can also be submitted directly to the President.

== Officers ==
When a session begins, the senate elects a president and a vice president, who may not be ministers or parliamentary secretaries. The president of the senate usually votes only to break a tie. The president of the senate serves as acting president if the president of Barbados is suspended from office due to pending impeachment proceedings.

== See also ==
- Politics of Barbados
- Cabinet of Barbados
- List of presidents of the Legislative Council of Barbados (1813–1963)
- List of presidents of the Senate of Barbados (1964–present)
- List of members of the Senate of Barbados
